= Andre Anderson =

Andre Anderson or Andre Andersen may refer to:

- Andre Anderson (boxer) (1890–1926), American boxer
- André Anderson (American football, born 1988), American football player
- André Anderson (footballer) (born 1999), Brazilian association football player
- André Andersen (born 1961), Russian instrumentalist and composer
- Andre Anderson (gridiron football, born 1955), Canadian gridiron football player
- Andre Anderson, a fictional character in the television series Gen V

== See also ==
- Andree Anderson (active 1957–1959), American figure skater
