= 2010 Missouri Tigers football team =

American college football season

2010 Missouri Tigers football

Big 12 North Division co-champion

Insight Bowl, L 24–27 vs. Iowa
- Conference: Big 12 Conference
- North Division

Ranking
- Coaches: No. 18
- AP: No. 18
- Record: 10–3 (6–2 Big 12)
- Head coach: Gary Pinkel (10th season)
- Offensive coordinator: David Yost (2nd season)
- Offensive scheme: Spread
- Defensive coordinator: Dave Steckel (2nd season)
- Base defense: 4–3
- Home stadium: Faurot Field

2010 Big 12 Conference football standings
	Conf.			Overall
Team	W		L	W		L
North Division
No. 20 Nebraska xy	6	–	2	10	–	4
No. 18 Missouri x	6	–	2	10	–	3
Kansas State	3	–	5	7	–	6
Iowa State	3	–	5	5	–	7
Colorado	2	–	6	5	–	7
Kansas	1	–	7	3	–	9
South Division
No. 6 Oklahoma xy$	6	–	2	12	–	2
No. 13 Oklahoma State x	6	–	2	11	–	2
No. 19 Texas A&M x	6	–	2	9	–	4
Baylor	4	–	4	7	–	6
Texas Tech	3	–	5	8	–	5
Texas	2	–	6	5	–	7
Championship: Oklahoma 23, Nebraska 20
$ – BCS representative as conference champion; x – Division champion/co-champions; y – Championship game participant; Rankings from AP Poll

The 2010 Missouri Tigers football team represented the University of Missouri in the 2010 NCAA Division I FBS football season. The team was coached by Gary Pinkel, who returned for his tenth season with Mizzou, and played their home games at Faurot Field at Memorial Stadium. The team began the season fresh off their fifth straight bowl appearance. The team hired a new public address announcer, Randy Moehlman.

Michael Egnew (TE), was named to the 1st-Team All-American list. He became the third MU tight end to win that honor in the last four years. The previous two were Martin Rucker (2007) and Chase Coffman (2008). Egnew led all of the nation's tight ends with 83 receptions, and his 698 receiving yards was also second-most among all tight ends, with those figures coming against the nation's 9th-toughest schedule. The Tigers finished the regular season with a 10–2 record and faced the Iowa Hawkeyes in the Insight Bowl, which they lost by a score of 27–24.

In early August 2010, the team voted their star running back Derrick Washington team captain. Washington had led the team in all rushing categories in each of the previous two seasons. However, just after being named captain, Washington was investigated for sexually assaulting his tutor, a female MU student, which led to a felony charge of deviate sexual assault and his suspension from the football team at the end of preseason camp. He dropped out of school shortly afterwards, and was eventually convicted of sexual assault a year later, serving 120 days of a 5-year sentence.

== Recruits ==
Key Losses:

- WR Danario Alexander
- DL Jaron Baston
- DE Brian Coulter
- P Jake Harry
- DL Andy Maples
- K Tanner Mills
- WR Jared Perry
- S Hardy Ricks
- LB Terrance Jackson
- OL Ryan Schleusner
- LB Sean Weatherspoon

All 23 listed players are verbal commits and are not binding until signing their National Letter of Intent during the National Signing Period February 3, 2010 – April 1, 2010.
All 23 signed on February 3.

College recruiting (2009)
Name	Hometown	School	Height	Weight	40^{‡}	Commit date
Nick Demien; OT	Wentzville, Missouri	Timberland HS	6 ft 6 in (1.98 m)	295 lb (134 kg)	5.0	Aug 15, 2009
Nick Demien; OT	Recruit ratings: Scout: Rivals: (80)					
Kony Ealy; DE	New Madrid, Missouri	Central HS	6 ft 6 in (1.98 m)	228 lb (103 kg)	4.55	Nov 2, 2009
Kony Ealy; DE	Recruit ratings: Scout: Rivals: (78)					
Daniel Easterly; S / ATH	Detroit, Michigan	Cass Technical HS	6 ft 4 in (1.93 m)	186 lb (84 kg)	4.89	Dec 7, 2009
Daniel Easterly; S / ATH	Recruit ratings: Scout: Rivals: (78)					
James Franklin; QB	Lake Dallas, Texas	Lake Dallas HS	6 ft 3 in (1.91 m)	217 lb (98 kg)	4.6	Mar 14, 2009
James Franklin; QB	Recruit ratings: Scout: Rivals: (76)					
Tyler Gabbert; QB	Ballwin, Missouri	Parkway West HS	6 ft 0 in (1.83 m)	190 lb (86 kg)	4.67	Dec 12, 2009
Tyler Gabbert; QB	Recruit ratings: Scout: Rivals: (76)					
E. J. Gaines; DB	Independence, Missouri	Fort Osage HS	5 ft 10.5 in (1.79 m)	168 lb (76 kg)	4.41	Jul 20, 2009
E. J. Gaines; DB	Recruit ratings: Scout: Rivals: (76)					
Anthony Gatti; OT	St. Louis, Missouri	Parkway North HS	6 ft 6 in (1.98 m)	280 lb (130 kg)	NA	Jul 21, 2009
Anthony Gatti; OT	Recruit ratings: Scout: Rivals: (74)					
Matt Hoch; DE	Harlan, Iowa	Harlan Community HS	6 ft 4.5 in (1.94 m)	235 lb (107 kg)	4.85	Dec 19, 2009
Matt Hoch; DE	Recruit ratings: Scout: Rivals: (76)					
Tristan Holt; DB	Gilmer, Texas	Gilmer HS	6 ft 0 in (1.83 m)	184 lb (83 kg)	4.45	Jul 17, 2009
Tristan Holt; DB	Recruit ratings: Scout: Rivals: (40)					
Jimmie Hunt; WR	Cahokia, Illinois	Cahokia HS	6 ft 0.5 in (1.84 m)	185 lb (84 kg)	4.45	Jun 7, 2009
Jimmie Hunt; WR	Recruit ratings: Scout: Rivals: (40)					
Henry Josey; RB / ATH	Angleton, Texas	Angleton HS	5 ft 9.5 in (1.77 m)	177 lb (80 kg)	4.4	Sep 20, 2009
Henry Josey; RB / ATH	Recruit ratings: Scout: Rivals: (70)					
Marcus Lucas; WR	Liberty, Missouri	Liberty HS	6 ft 4.5 in (1.94 m)	190 lb (86 kg)	4.50	Dec 19, 2009
Marcus Lucas; WR	Recruit ratings: Scout: Rivals: (79)					
Mitch Morse; OT	Austin, Texas	St. Michael's Academy	6 ft 6 in (1.98 m)	283 lb (128 kg)	5.20	Apr 19, 2009
Mitch Morse; OT	Recruit ratings: Scout: Rivals: (80)					
Marcus Murphy; RB	Desoto, Texas	De Soto HS	5 ft 9 in (1.75 m)	167 lb (76 kg)	4.50	Dec 12, 2009
Marcus Murphy; RB	Recruit ratings: Scout: Rivals: (76)					
Jared Parham; LB	Coppell, Texas	Coppell HS	6 ft 2 in (1.88 m)	220 lb (100 kg)	4.60	Jun 23, 2009
Jared Parham; LB	Recruit ratings: Scout: Rivals: (77)					
Darvin Ruise; S / ATH	Glen Saint Mary, Florida	Baker County Senior HS	6 ft 1 in (1.85 m)	209 lb (95 kg)	4.57	Nov 9, 2009
Darvin Ruise; S / ATH	Recruit ratings: Scout: Rivals: (74)					
Bud Sasser; WR	Denton, Texas	Ryan HS	6 ft 3.5 in (1.92 m)	200 lb (91 kg)	4.60	Dec 19, 2009
Bud Sasser; WR	Recruit ratings: Scout: Rivals: (78)					
Xavier Smith; DB	Edmond, Oklahoma	North HS	5 ft 11 in (1.80 m)	180 lb (82 kg)	4.49	Jul 22, 2009
Xavier Smith; DB	Recruit ratings: Scout: Rivals: (75)					
Lucas Vincent; DT	Olathe, Kansas	Olathe North Sr HS	6 ft 3 in (1.91 m)	269 lb (122 kg)	4.91	Apr 18, 2009
Lucas Vincent; DT	Recruit ratings: Scout: Rivals: (78)					
Kenronte Walker; S	Fayetteville, North Carolina	City College of San Francisco	6 ft 1 in (1.85 m)	208 lb (94 kg)	4.45	Dec 12, 2009
Kenronte Walker; S	Recruit ratings: Scout: Rivals: (NA)					
Eric Waters; TE	Arlington, Texas	Mansfield Summit HS	6 ft 3.5 in (1.92 m)	215 lb (98 kg)	4.70	Sep 20, 2009
Eric Waters; TE	Recruit ratings: Scout: Rivals: (76)					
Braylon Webb; DB	Gilmer, Texas	Gilmer HS	6 ft 2 in (1.88 m)	180 lb (82 kg)	NA	Jul 21, 2009
Braylon Webb; DB	Recruit ratings: Scout: Rivals: (40)					
Greg White; RB	De Queen, Arkansas	De Queen HS	6 ft 2 in (1.88 m)	213 lb (97 kg)	4.60	Jul 28, 2009
Greg White; RB	Recruit ratings: Scout: Rivals: (77)					
Overall recruit ranking: Scout: 27t Rivals: 21 ESPN: 72
‡ Refers to 40-yard dash; Note: In many cases, Scout, Rivals, 247Sports, On3, and ESPN may conflict in their listings of height, weight and 40 time.; In these cases, the average was taken. ESPN grades are on a 100-point scale.; Sources: "Missouri 2010 Football Commitments". Rivals.; "2010 Missouri Commits". Scout.; "2010 Player Commitments – Missouri". ESPN.; "Scout.com Team Recruiting Rankings". Scout.; "2010 Team Ranking". Rivals.com.

== Schedule ==
The October 23 game against Oklahoma played host to ESPN's College GameDay, a first for the program, and drew a new record crowd of 18,000 for the show.

Date	Time	Opponent	Rank	Site	TV	Result	Attendance	Source
September 4	11:30 am	vs. Illinois*		Edward Jones Dome; St. Louis, MO (rivalry)	FSN	W 23–13	58,060	
September 11	6:00 pm	McNeese State*		Faurot Field; Columbia, MO	FSN PPV	W 50–6	55,582	
September 18	6:00 pm	San Diego State*		Faurot Field; Columbia, MO	FSN PPV	W 27–24	56,050	
September 25	1:00 pm	Miami (OH)*		Faurot Field; Columbia, MO		W 51–13	60,329	
October 9	6:00 pm	Colorado	No. 24	Faurot Field; Columbia, MO	FSN	W 26–0	62,965	
October 16	11:00 am	at Texas A&M	No. 21	Kyle Field; College Station, TX	FSN	W 30–9	83,453	
October 23	7:00 pm	No. 3 Oklahoma^{†}	No. 18	Faurot Field; Columbia, MO (rivalry / College GameDay)	ABC	W 36–27	71,004	
October 30	2:30 pm	at No. 14 Nebraska	No. 7	Memorial Stadium; Lincoln, NE (rivalry)	ABC/ESPN	L 17–31	85,907	
November 6	7:00 pm	at Texas Tech	No. 14	Jones AT&T Stadium; Lubbock, TX	ABC	L 17–24	55,667	
November 13	11:30 am	Kansas State	No. 20	Faurot Field; Columbia, MO (Senior Day)	FSN	W 38–28	63,310	
November 20	6:00 pm	at Iowa State	No. 15	Jack Trice Stadium; Ames, IA (rivalry)	FSN	W 14–0	41,776	
November 27	11:30 am	vs. Kansas	No. 15	Arrowhead Stadium; Kansas City, MO (Border War)	FSN	W 35–7	55,788	
December 28	9:00 pm	Iowa*	No. 14	Sun Devil Stadium; Tempe, Arizona (Insight Bowl)	ESPN	L 24–27	53,453	
*Non-conference game; ^{†}Homecoming; Rankings from AP Poll released prior to the game; All times are in Central time

== Roster ==
2010 Missouri Tigers roster(as of 8/30/10 MUTIGERS.com)
Wide receivers: 2 L'Damian Washington – (redshirt) Freshman; 3 Gahn McGaffie – '' (redshirt) Sophomore; 5 Rolandis Woodland – (redshirt) Sophomore; 8 Wes Kemp – Junior; 9 Kerwin Stricker – (redshirt) Freshman; 14 Jaleel Clark – (redshirt) Freshman; 16 Brandon Gerau – Junior; 21 Bud Sasser – Freshman; 22 Joe Plevel – (redshirt) Sophomore; 28 T. J. Moe – Sophomore; 29 Jerrell Jackson – Junior; 33 Drew O'Connell – Freshman; 80 Terry Dennis – Junior; 81 Aaron Lewis - (redshirt) Freshman; 85 Marcus Lucas – Freshman; 88 Jimmie Hunt – Freshman; 88 Forrest Shock – Senior; Offensive line: 51 Steven Carberry – Freshman; 53 Travis Ruth – (redshirt) Sophomore; 56 Robert Luce – Freshman; 60 Greg Drain – Freshman; 61 Max Copeland – (redshirt) Freshman; 62 Tim Barnes – Senior; 63 Mitch Morse – Freshman; 66 Austin Wuebbels – (redshirt) Junior; 67 Chris Freeman – (redshirt) Freshman; 68 Justin Britt – (redshirt) Freshman; 69 Wilson Rigg – Freshman; 70 Marvin Norman – (redshirt) Junior; 70 Anthony Gatti – Freshman; 71 Jayson Palmgren – (redshirt) Junior; 72 Elvis Fisher – Junior; 73 Mark Hill – (redshirt) Freshman; 74 Kirk Lakebrink – Senior; 75 Jack Meiners – Sophomore; 76 Quinn Brown – Junior; 77 Dan Hoch – Junior; 78 Nick Demien – (redshirt) Freshman; 79 Taylor Davis – (redshirt) Sophomore; Tight ends: 81 Eric Waters – Freshman; 82 Michael Egnew – Junior; 86 Beau Brinkley – Junior; 87 Andrew Jones – Junior; 89 Matt Hoch – Freshman	Quarterbacks: 1 James Franklin – Freshman; 7 Tyler Gabbert – Freshman; 11 Blaine Gabbert – Junior; 12 Jimmy Costello – Junior; 16 Ashton Glaser – (redshirt) Freshman; Running (Tail) backs: 4 Kendial Lawrence – Sophomore; 26 De'Vion Moore – (redshirt) Junior; 35 Matt Davis – Senior; 38 Jared Culver – (redshirt) Sophomore; 40 Greg White – Freshman; 41 Henry Josey – Freshman; 43 Marcus Murphy – Freshman; Defensive line: 3 Jacquies Smith – Junior; 18 Marcus Malbrough – (redshirt) Sophomore; 50 Diondre Ellis – Freshman; 51 Bryson Cofield – Freshman; 52 Michael Sam – (redshirt) Freshman; 55 Brayden Burnett – (redshirt) Freshman; 57 Brad Madison – (redshirt) Sophomore; 58 Brendan Donaldson – Junior; 59 Ben Eskelsen – Freshman; 85 Aldon Smith (End) – (redshirt) Sophomore; 90 Dominique Hamilton – Junior; 91 Jimmy Burge – (redshirt) Sophomore; 92 Corey Sudhoff – (redshirt) Freshman; 93 Terrell Resonno – (redshirt) Junior; 94 Marvin Foster – (redshirt) Freshman; 96 Lucas Vincent – Freshman; 97 Kony Ealy – Freshman; 98 Bart Coslet – Senior; 99 George White – (redshirt) Sophomore; Linebackers: 5 Josh Tatum – (redshirt) Junior; 6 Andrew Gachkar – Senior; 10 Tavon Bolden – Freshman; 12 Darvin Ruise – Freshman; 15 Donovan Bonner – Sophomore; 25 Zaviar Gooden – '' (redshirt) Sophomore; 32 Will Ebner – Junior; 33 Luke Lambert – Senior; 35 Jeff Gettys – Senior; 36 Jared Parham – Freshman; 47 Adam Burton – (redshirt) Freshman; 48 Andrew Wilson – (redshirt) Freshman; 54 Michael Brennan – (redshirt) Freshman	Safety: 11 Jarrell Harrison – Senior; 34 Tony Randolph – (redshirt) Freshman; Strong Safety: 30 Kenronte Walker – Junior; Free Safety: 10 Jasper Simmons – Senior †; 13 Kenji Jackson – Junior; 17 Matt White – (redshirt) Freshman; Defensive backs: 1 Kip Edwards – (redshirt) Sophomore; 7 Munir Prince – (redshirt) Senior ††; 14 Daniel Easterly – Freshman; 19 Carl Gettis – Senior; 20 Kevin Rutland – Senior; 21 Trey Hobson – (redshirt) Junior; 22 Robert Steeples – (redshirt) Sophomore; 26 Xavier Smith – Freshman; 28 Randy Ponder – Sophomore; 31 E.J. Gaines – Freshman; 43 Tony Buhr – Senior; 45 Tyler Davis – (redshirt) Freshman; 46 Tyler Holt – Freshman; 49 Braylon Webb – Freshman; Punters: 92 Christian Brinser – Freshman; 95 Grant Ressel – (redshirt) Junior; 97 Trey Barrow – (redshirt) Sophomore; 99 Matt Grabner – Senior; Kickers: 95 Grant Ressel – (redshirt) Junior; 97 Trey Barrow – (redshirt) Sophomore
† Suspended 9/27. †† Knocked out in training camp drill. Retired.

== Coaching staff ==
Name	Position	Years at MU	Alma mater (Year)
Gary Pinkel	Head coach	10	Kent State (1975)
David Yost	Assistant head coach Offensive coordinator Quarterbacks, Recruiting Coordinator	10	Kent State (1992)
Dave Steckel	Linebackers, defensive coordinator	10	Kutztown (1982)
Barry Odom	Safeties	8	University of Missouri (1999)
Cornell Ford	Cornerbacks	10	Toledo (1991)
Andy Hill	Receivers coach Wide receivers, tight ends	15	University of Missouri (1985)
Brian Jones	Running backs	10	Connecticut (1981)
Craig Kuligowski	Defensive line	10	Toledo (1991)
Bruce Walker	Assistant Co-offensive Line	10	Central Washington (1983)
Josh Henson	Assistant Co-offensive Line	2	Oklahoma State (1998)
Dan Hopkins	Director of football operations	4	University of Missouri (2004)
Nick Otterbacher	Director of football recruiting	7	Toledo (2002)

Coaching staff from: "2010 Mizzou Football Roster - Coaches". CSTV.com. Archived from the original on January 1, 2008.

== Game summaries ==
=== Illinois ===
@ St. Louis, Missouri

	1	2	3	4	Total
Illinois	3	10	0	0	13
Missouri	0	3	7	13	23

Blaine Gabbert's second-half TDs rally Mizzou as defense stops Illinois

=== McNeese State ===
	1	2	3	4	Total
McNeese State	0	0	0	6	6
Missouri	14	19	17	0	50

Powered by freshman RB Henry Josey, Missouri rolls to easy victory

=== San Diego State ===
	1	2	3	4	Total
San Diego State	7	7	0	10	24
#25 Missouri	10	7	3	7	27

T.J. Moe's touchdown reception with 51 seconds left helps Tigers escape

=== Miami (OH) ===
	1	2	3	4	Total
Miami (OH)	0	3	3	7	13
#24 Missouri	21	7	23	0	51

Seven players score TDs as unbeaten Mizzou trounces Miami (Ohio)

=== Colorado ===
	1	2	3	4	Total
Colorado	0	0	0	0	0
#22/24 Missouri	5	14	0	7	26

#24 Missouri fights off sluggish O, Blaine Gabbert injury to best Colorado

=== @ Texas A&M ===
	1	2	3	4	Total
#19/21 Missouri	6	10	14	0	30
Texas A&M	0	0	3	6	9

Missouri's defense stifles A&M as Blaine Gabbert tosses 3 TDs

=== Oklahoma ===
	1	2	3	4	Total
#3/3 Oklahoma	7	7	7	6	27
#16/18 Missouri	7	10	3	16	36

No. 11 Missouri rides 16-point fourth past top-ranked Oklahoma

QB Blaine Gabbert won Big 12 honors, sharing co-offensive player-of-the-week. Gahn McGaffie was named the special teams player-of-the-week.

Gabbert finished 30 of 42 for 308 yards and a score. In the fourth quarter, he completed 8-of-9 passes for 95 yards and one touchdown.

McGaffie returned the opening kickoff 86 yards for a touchdown. It was the first kickoff return for a touchdown for Mizzou since Jeremy Maclin did it in 2008, and was the first time Mizzou returned the opening kickoff for a touchdown since Roger Wehrli went 96 yards for a score against Iowa State in 1967.

It was the first time Gabbert was named player-of-the-week this season.

This was the first time Missouri started 7–0 since 1960.

During Oklahoma's final play from scrimmage, fans began pouring over the walls and running onto the field to celebrate the victory. In the chaos, 30 Missouri fans were arrested for trespassing, setting off a legal battle that ended later that month when the university declined to press charges.

=== @ Nebraska ===
	1	2	3	4	Total
#8/7 Missouri	0	7	10	0	17
#12/14 Nebraska	24	0	7	0	31

Roy Helu Jr. rushes for a school-record 307 yards; Nebraska QB Taylor Martinez hobbled

=== @ Texas Tech ===
	1	2	3	4	Total
#14/14 Missouri	14	3	0	0	17
Texas Tech	3	7	14	0	24

Blaine Gabbert struggles as No. 12 Missouri comes up short

=== Kansas State ===
	1	2	3	4	Total
Kansas State	0	14	0	14	28
#20/20 Missouri	7	14	10	7	38

Blaine Gabbert's 3 TDs, defensive plays give Mizzou edge over error-prone K-State

=== @ Iowa State ===
	1	2	3	4	Total
#16/15 Missouri	7	0	0	7	14
Iowa State	0	0	0	0	0

#15 Mizzou uses fake punt to outlast Iowa State

=== Kansas ===
@ Kansas City, Missouri

	1	2	3	4	Total
Kansas	0	0	7	0	7
#16/15 Missouri	14	7	7	7	35

Tigers hold Jayhawks to 141 yards of total offense in win

Gary Pinkel's 150th career win as a coach (77-48 at Missouri, 73-37-3 at Toledo).

Missouri had never played better defensively in a Big 12 game—and now the Tigers might never play another Big 12 game.

In a 35–7 victory over Kansas on Saturday, the Tigers (No. 14 BCS, No. 15 AP) held their archrivals to 141 yards, the fewest they allowed a conference opponent in the Big 12's 15 seasons.

In the 119th meeting between these programs, Missouri evened the all-time series (according to the NCAA record book) at 55-55-9. The Tigers won four of the last five. Missouri wrapped up a 10-win season for the fourth time in school history and third under coach Gary Pinkel.

=== Iowa (Insight Bowl) ===
@ Tempe, Arizona

Marcus Coker runs for 219, Micah Hyde returns INT to fuel Iowa rally

	1	2	3	4	Total
#14/14 Missouri	3	7	14	0	24
Iowa	7	10	3	7	27

== Statistics ==
Statistics from: "Missouri Tigers - Cumulative Season Statistics 2010". CSTV.com. December 28, 2010. Archived from the original on January 1, 2011.

=== Scores by quarter ===
(through December 28, 2010)

	1	2	3	4	Total
Missouri	108	108	108	64	388
Opponents	51	58	44	56	209

== Rankings ==
Ranking movements Legend: ██ Increase in ranking ██ Decrease in ranking RV = Received votes
	Week															
Poll	Pre	1	2	3	4	5	6	7	8	9	10	11	12	13	14	Final
AP	RV	RV	RV	RV	RV	24	21	18	7	14	20	15	15	15	14	18
Coaches	RV	RV	25	24	23	22	19	16	8	14	20	16	16	14	14	18
Harris	Not released						19	16	8	15	20	16	16	14	13	Not released
BCS	Not released							11	6	12	17	15	14	12	12	Not released
