= Alcy Jackson =

Alcy Jackson (born 1955) is a former athlete who competed in football, track, and basketball. Jackson grew up in Dallas, Texas, where he graduated from South Oak Cliff High School (SOC) in 1973.

== High School Sports ==
At SOC, Jackson played three sports.

In track & field, Jackson's best event was the 120 yard high hurdles; in his senior year, he ran that distance in 13.9 seconds, which was the fastest time in the state among high school sprinters that year, as well as the 4th fastest time in the country. In basketball, Jackson led a team that competed deep into the state playoffs. In football, he played quarterback and wide receiver on offense and was first team All State at defensive back.

In 1981, D Magazine compiled its list of the greatest high school football players in Dallas history. About Jackson, the author wrote, “Alcy Jackson: This 6-foot-3, 180-pound SOC super hero could play any position on the team. As a sophomore in the playoff game against Fort Worth, he threw one touchdown pass and caught another one. As a junior quarterback he led SOC to the state semifinals; as a senior defensive back in 1972, he made all-state.”

In 1984, the Dallas Morning News created an all-time Dallas-area high school all-star team. On that hypothetical team, drawn from players from all area high schools over the preceding 60 years, Jackson started at defensive back. A 2013 article from that same newspaper concluded that South Oak Cliff High School (SOC) had produced the most talented defensive backs of any high school in the area. To demonstrate their point, they listed 5 players from recent decades: Jackson, along with Egypt Allen, Danny Colbert, Michael Downs, and Rod Jones.

While in high school, Jackson was one of the most highly recruited football players in the country. At the time, he gave an interview on how college coaches ignored NCAA rules and how college boosters routinely offered financial inducements to attend their schools. He made these comments while singling out his intended Baylor coach, Grant Teaff, who he viewed as low key and honest. Within a few years, the two Baylor rivals geographically closest to Jackson's high school were in trouble with the NCAA: Ft. Worth's TCU received a serious probation, and Dallas's SMU received the Death Penalty. As noted in the Texas Almanac, "the conference was torn and tarnished by football recruiting scandals and NCAA probations, which hit all Texas members except Baylor and Rice in the '80s and saw SMU's program suspended for two years when hit by the NCAA 'Death Penalty.'"

== College Sports ==
Jackson earned an athletic scholarship to Baylor University and competed in two sports during his four years at Baylor.

In track & field, Jackson set a Baylor record in the 110 meter high hurdles in 1976. His time (13.70 seconds) remains one of the 5 fastest times in school history.

In football, Jackson started for Baylor at wide receiver for 3 seasons.

Jackson was one of the leaders of the 1974 Baylor football team that ended the season ranked 12th in the country and won the Southwest Conference title for the first time since 1924. The championship was unexpected since the team had gone 29-73-1 over the prior decade. Early in that season, Jackson converted a short swing pass into a 56-yard touchdown that helped spark Baylor's upset of the University of Texas. Long remembered as the “Miracle on the Brazos” by Baylor fans, that victory was remarkable since Baylor hadn't beaten Texas, an annual college rival, since 1956. During that championship season, Jackson led the team in receptions and reception yardage, and led the conference in yards per reception.

Jackson injured his shoulder playing football and retired from competitive sports after college.
