= 2010 Kansas Jayhawks football team =

American college football season

2010 Kansas Jayhawks football
- Conference: Big 12 Conference
- North
- Record: 3–9 (1–7 Big 12)
- Head coach: Turner Gill (1st season)
- Offensive coordinator: Chuck Long (1st season)
- Offensive scheme: Spread
- Defensive coordinator: Carl Torbush (1st season)
- Base defense: 4–3
- Home stadium: Memorial Stadium

2010 Big 12 Conference football standings
	Conf.			Overall
Team	W		L	W		L
North Division
No. 20 Nebraska xy	6	–	2	10	–	4
No. 18 Missouri x	6	–	2	10	–	3
Kansas State	3	–	5	7	–	6
Iowa State	3	–	5	5	–	7
Colorado	2	–	6	5	–	7
Kansas	1	–	7	3	–	9
South Division
No. 6 Oklahoma xy$	6	–	2	12	–	2
No. 13 Oklahoma State x	6	–	2	11	–	2
No. 19 Texas A&M x	6	–	2	9	–	4
Baylor	4	–	4	7	–	6
Texas Tech	3	–	5	8	–	5
Texas	2	–	6	5	–	7
Championship: Oklahoma 23, Nebraska 20
$ – BCS representative as conference champion; x – Division champion/co-champions; y – Championship game participant; Rankings from AP Poll

The 2010 Kansas Jayhawks football team (variously "Kansas", "KU", or the "Jayhawks") represented the University of Kansas in the 2010 NCAA Division I FBS football season which was the school's 121st season. The Jayhawks played their home games on Kivisto Field at Memorial Stadium in Lawrence, Kansas.

The team was led by first year head coach Turner Gill and was a member of the Big 12 Conference in the North Division. The team captains were senior running back Angus Quigley, senior offensive lineman Sal Capra, senior defensive end Jake Laptad, senior linebacker Justin Springer, and senior cornerback Chris Harris.

The Jayhawks finished the season 3–9, 1–7 in Big 12 play and did not play for bowl game for the second consecutive year, but was highlighted with a 35-point fourth-quarter comeback against Colorado, making it the Jayhawks' largest comeback in program history, as well as the largest fourth quarter comeback of all time.

== Pre-season ==
=== Coaching changes ===
Former head coach Mark Mangino resigned from his position on December 3, following a 7-game losing streak and internal investigation into his conduct. Turner Gill, former head coach at the University at Buffalo was named the new head coach on December 13, 2009. Gill will bring with him Carl Torbush as his defensive coordinator and Chuck Long as his offensive coordinator. None of Mangino's assistant coaches or strength and conditioning staff were retained by Gill.

New Coaches
Name	Position	Prev. School	Replaces
Turner Gill	Head coach	Buffalo	Mark Mangino
Chuck Long	Offensive Coordinator		Ed Warinner
Carl Torbush	Defensive Coordinator	Mississippi State	Clint Bowen/Bill Miller
Aaron Stamm	Special Teams	Buffalo	Louie Matsakis
Aaron Stamm	Tight Ends	Buffalo	Brandon Blaney
Darrell Wyatt	Wide Receivers	Southern Miss.	David Beaty
Buddy Wyatt	Defensive Line	Texas A&M	Tom Sims
Carl Torbush	Linebackers	Mississippi State	Bill Miller
Chuck Long	QBs		Ed Warinner
Vic Shealy	Cornerbacks	Richmond	Je'Ney Jackson
Robert Wimberly	Safeties	Buffalo	Clint Bowen
Reggie Mitchell	Running backs	Illinois	Louie Matsakis
J.B. Grimes	Offensive Line	Mississippi State	John Reagan
Reggie Mitchell	Recruiting Coordinator	Illinois	Brandon Blaney
John Williams	Strength & Conditioning	South Carolina State	Chris Dawson
Joe Dailey	On-Campus Recruiting Coord.	Buffalo	

=== Recruiting ===
Expand the list below to see the full recruiting class.

College recruiting information (2010)
Name	Hometown	School	Height	Weight	40^{‡}	Commit date
Keba Agostinho; DE	Katy, TX	Taylor HS	6 ft 3 in (1.91 m)	250 lb (110 kg)	4.7	Jan 28, 2010
Keba Agostinho; DE	Recruit ratings: Scout: Rivals: (40)					
JaQwaylin Arps; DE	Denison, TX	Denison HS	6 ft 3 in (1.91 m)	230 lb (100 kg)	-	Aug 31, 2009
JaQwaylin Arps; DE	Recruit ratings: Scout: Rivals: (75)					
Brandon Bourbon; RB	Potosi, MO	Potosi HS	6 ft 2 in (1.88 m)	205 lb (93 kg)	4.4	Jan 31, 2010
Brandon Bourbon; RB	Recruit ratings: Scout: Rivals: (75)					
Jeremiah Edwards; DT	Garland, TX	Garland HS	6 ft 1 in (1.85 m)	270 lb (120 kg)	4.9	Apr 16, 2009
Jeremiah Edwards; DT	Recruit ratings: Scout: Rivals: (78)					
Jake Farley; LB	Cedar Falls, IA	Cedar Falls HS	6 ft 2 in (1.88 m)	210 lb (95 kg)	-	Jan 17, 2010
Jake Farley; LB	Recruit ratings: Scout: Rivals: (74)					
Ed Fink; LB	Belleville, IL	Althoff Catholic HS	6 ft 3 in (1.91 m)	221 lb (100 kg)	-	Oct 26, 2009
Ed Fink; LB	Recruit ratings: Scout: Rivals: (75)					
Julius Green; DE	Aldine, TX	Aldine High School	6 ft 7 in (2.01 m)	245 lb (111 kg)	-	Jun 9, 2010
Julius Green; DE	Recruit ratings: Scout: Rivals: (40)					
Ricki Herod Jr. WR	Mesquite, TX	North Mesquite HS	6 ft 2 in (1.88 m)	175 lb (79 kg)	-	Apr 15, 2009
Ricki Herod Jr. WR	Recruit ratings: Scout: Rivals: (77)					
Chad Kolumber; OL	Woodberry Forest, VA	Woodberry Forest School	6 ft 8 in (2.03 m)	286 lb (130 kg)	-	Jan 17, 2010
Chad Kolumber; OL	Recruit ratings: Scout: Rivals: (40)					
Pat Lewandowski; DE	Overland Park, KS	Blue Valley West HS	6 ft 6 in (1.98 m)	248 lb (112 kg)	-	Jan 17, 2010
Pat Lewandowski; DE	Recruit ratings: Scout: Rivals: (77)					
Brian Maura; WR	Miami, FL	Felix Varela Senior HS	6 ft 3 in (1.91 m)	190 lb (86 kg)	4.49	Jan 17, 2010
Brian Maura; WR	Recruit ratings: Scout: Rivals: (40)					
Dexter McDonald; S/CB	Kansas City, MO	Rockhurst HS	6 ft 2 in (1.88 m)	180 lb (82 kg)	-	Jan 28, 2010
Dexter McDonald; S/CB	Recruit ratings: Scout: Rivals: (79)					
Quinn Mecham; QB	Provo, UT	Snow JC (Utah)	6 ft 2 in (1.88 m)	195 lb (88 kg)	-	Dec 13, 2009
Quinn Mecham; QB	Recruit ratings: Scout: Rivals:					
Ray Mitchell; S/CB	Irving, TX	Irving MacArthur HS	6 ft 1 in (1.85 m)	180 lb (82 kg)	-	Dec 20, 2009
Ray Mitchell; S/CB	Recruit ratings: Scout: Rivals: (73)					
Jimmay Mundine; TE	Denison, TX	Denison HS	6 ft 1 in (1.85 m)	225 lb (102 kg)	4.6	Jul 31, 2009
Jimmay Mundine; TE	Recruit ratings: Scout: Rivals: (73)					
James Sims; RB	Irving, TX	Irving MacArthur HS	6 ft 0 in (1.83 m)	205 lb (93 kg)	4.5	Jul 13, 2009
James Sims; RB	Recruit ratings: Scout: Rivals: (77)					
Trent Smiley; TE	Frisco, TX	Wakeland HS	6 ft 4 in (1.93 m)	225 lb (102 kg)	4.6	Jul 7, 2009
Trent Smiley; TE	Recruit ratings: Scout: Rivals: (75)					
Keeston Terry; WR	Blue Springs, MO	Blue Springs HS	6 ft 2 in (1.88 m)	179 lb (81 kg)	4.69	Aug 1, 2009
Keeston Terry; WR	Recruit ratings: Scout: Rivals: (75)					
Andrew Turzilli; WR	Butler, NJ	Butler HS	6 ft 4 in (1.93 m)	185 lb (84 kg)	4.65	Aug 27, 2009
Andrew Turzilli; WR	Recruit ratings: Scout: Rivals: (40)					
Overall recruit ranking: Scout: 66 Rivals: 55 ESPN: NR
‡ Refers to 40-yard dash; Note: In many cases, Scout, Rivals, 247Sports, On3, and ESPN may conflict in their listings of height, weight and 40 time.; In these cases, the average was taken. ESPN grades are on a 100-point scale.; Sources: "2010 Kansas Football Commits". Rivals.; "2010 Kansas Football Commits". Scout.; "ESPN". ESPN.; "Scout.com Team Recruiting Rankings". Scout.; "2010 Team Ranking". Rivals.com.

=== Watch lists ===
- Jake Laptad - Hendricks Award Watchlist
- Tim Biere - John Mackey Award Watchlist

== Schedule ==
Date	Time	Opponent	Site	TV	Result	Attendance
September 4	6:00 p.m.	North Dakota State*	Memorial Stadium; Lawrence, KS	FCS	L 3–6	48,417
September 11	11:00 a.m.	No. 15 Georgia Tech*	Memorial Stadium; Lawrence, KS	FSN	W 28–25	46,907
September 17	7:00 p.m.	at Southern Miss*	M. M. Roberts Stadium; Hattiesburg, MS	ESPN	L 16–31	30,211
September 25	6:00 p.m.	New Mexico State*	Memorial Stadium; Lawrence, KS	FCS	W 42–16	46,719
October 2	11:00 a.m.	at Baylor	Floyd Casey Stadium; Waco, TX	FSN	L 7–55	35,405
October 14	6:30 p.m.	Kansas State	Memorial Stadium; Lawrence, KS (Sunflower Showdown/Governor's Cup)	FSN	L 7–59	47,561
October 23	6:00 p.m.	Texas A&M^{†}	Memorial Stadium; Lawrence, KS	FSN	L 10–45	44,239
October 30	1:00 p.m.	at Iowa State	Jack Trice Stadium; Ames, IA		L 16–28	46,485
November 6	1:00 p.m.	Colorado	Memorial Stadium; Lawrence, KS		W 52–45	40,851
November 13	6:00 p.m.	at No. 9 Nebraska	Memorial Stadium; Lincoln, NE (rivalry)	FSN PPV	L 3–20	85,587
November 20	11:00 a.m.	No. 10 Oklahoma State	Memorial Stadium; Lawrence, KS	FSN	L 14–48	39,261
November 27	11:30 a.m.	vs. No. 15 Missouri	Arrowhead Stadium; Kansas City, MO (Border War)	FSN	L 7–35	55,788
*Non-conference game; ^{†}Homecoming; Rankings from AP Poll released prior to the game; All times are in Central time

== Roster ==
2010 Kansas Jayhawks football roster
(starters in bold)
**Quarterbacks**: 2 **Jordan Webb** - (redshirt) Fr.; 7 Kale Pick - (redshirt) So.; 8 Quinn Meacham - Jr.; 12 Christian Matthews - (redshirt) Fr. (also WR); 17 Blake Jablonski - Fr.; **Running backs**: (injured) 6 Rell Lewis - (redshirt) Jr.; 22 Angus Quigley - (redshirt) Sr.; 25 Brandon Bourbon - Fr.; 29 **James Sims** - Fr.; 30 Josh Smith - Fr.; 31 Steven Foster - (redshirt) Jr.; 32 Christian Lane - Fr.; 33 Nick Sizemore - So. (TR); 36 Deshaun Sands - (redshirt) Fr.; 37 Ryan Burton - (redshirt) Fr.; 38 Justin Puthoff - (redshirt) Fr.; 40 Tyler Hunt - (redshirt) So.; **Wide receivers**: 3 Reece Petty - (redshirt) Sr.; 12 Christian Matthews - (redshirt) Fr. (also QB); 15 **Daymond Patterson** - Jr.; 20 D.J. Beshears - So.; 24 **Bradley McDougald** - So.; 28 Willie O'Quinn - (redshirt) So.; 39 Patrick Schilling - (redshirt) So.; 47 Chase Knighton - (redshirt) So.; 80 Ricki Herod - Fr.; 81 **Jonathan Wilson** - Sr.; 82 Andrew Turzilli - Fr.; 83 Chris Omigie - (redshirt) Fr.; 84 Brian Maura - Fr.; 85 Rod Harris - (redshirt) Jr.; 88 Erick McGriff - (redshirt) Fr.; 89 Tertavian Ingram - (redshirt) Sr.; **Tight ends**: 11 A.J. Steward - (redshirt) Jr.; 41 Jimmay Mundine - Fr.; 43 Ted McNulty - (redshirt) Jr.; 46 Trent Smiley - Fr.; 86 **Tim Biere** - Jr.; 87 Bradley Dedeaux - (redshirt) Sr.	**Offensive line**: 53 Tom Mabry - (redshirt) Fr.; 54 Justin Carnes - (redshirt) Fr. (long snapper); 59 **Sal Capra** - (redshirt) Sr.; 62 Alex Smith - (redshirt) Sr.; 63 Chad Kolumber - Fr.; 65 Mike Martinovich -Jr.; 67 Duane Zlatnik - (redshirt) So.; 69 **Trevor Marrongelli** - (redshirt) So.; 70 Gavin Howard - (redshirt) Fr.; 72 **Tanner Hawkinson** - (redshirt) So.; 73 Joe Semple - (redshirt) So.; (injured) 74 Jeff Spikes - (redshirt) Jr.; 76 **Brad Thorson** - (redshirt) Sr.; 77 **Jeremiah Hatch** - (redshirt) Jr.; 79 Riley Spencer - (redshirt) Fr.; **Defensive line**: 55 Darius Parish - (redshirt) So.; 60 Dylan Avery - Fr.; 64 Randall Dent - (redshirt) Fr.; 66 Pat Lewandowski - Fr.; 71 John Williams - (redshirt) So.; 78 Shane Smith - (redshirt) Fr.; 90 **Kevin Young** - (redshirt) Fr.; 91 **Jake Laptad** - Sr.; 92 **Patrick Dorsey** - (redshirt) Jr.; 93 Quintin Woods - Sr.; 94 Tyrone Sellers - (redshirt) Fr.; 95 D.J. Marshall - (redshirt) So.; 96 Keba Agostinho - Fr.; 97 **Richard Johnson, Jr.** - (redshirt) Jr.; 98 JaQwaylin Arps - Fr.; 99 Julius Green - Fr.	**Linebackers**: (injured) 34 Huldon Tharp - So.; 35 Toben Opurum - So.; 38 Josh Richardson - (redshirt) So.; 39 Darius Willis - So. (TR); 41 Jordan Fee - (redshirt) So.; 45 **Justin Springer** - Sr.; 46 Steve Mestan - (redshirt) Fr.; 47 Tyler Fee - Fr.; 49 **Drew Dudley** - Sr.; 50 Jake Farley - Fr.; 51 Dakota Lewis - (redshirt) Sr.; 52 **Steven Johnson** - Jr.; 57 Chea Peterman - (redshirt) Jr.; (injured) 58 Ed Fink - Fr.; **Cornerbacks**: 5 Greg Brown - (redshirt) So.; 10 Corrigan Powell - (redshirt) So.; 16 **Chris Harris** - Sr.; 17 Calvin Rubles - Sr.; 19 **Isiah Barfield** - (redshirt) Jr.; 23 Ryan Murphy - (redshirt) Jr.; 27 Dexter McDonald - Fr.; 30 Anthony Davis - (redshirt) Jr.; 33 Tyler Patmon - (redshirt) Fr.; 43 Brandon Hawks - (redshirt) So.; **Safeties**: 1 **Lubbock Smith** - (redshirt) So.; 4 Prinz Kande - (redshirt) Fr.; 9 Keeston Terry - Fr.; 14 Abdullah Sabir - Jr.; 24 Taylor Lee - (redshirt) So.; 26 Phillip Strozier - (redshirt) Sr.; 32 Dexter Linton - (redshirt) Fr.; 37 Brian Blackwell - (redshirt) Fr.; 40 Ray Mitchell - Fr.; 44 **Olaitan Oguntodu** - (redshirt) Sr.; **Punters**: 18 **Alonso Rojas** - Sr.; 19 Victor McBride - Fr.; **Kickers**: 12 Nathan Kalish - (redshirt) Fr.; 13 Ron Doherty - Fr. (KOS); 14 **Jacob Branstetter** - (redshirt) Sr.

== Game summaries ==
=== North Dakota State ===
	1	2	3	4	Total
Bison	0	3	3	0	6
Jayhawks	3	0	0	0	3

Turner Gill's debut game for the Jayhawks ended in dismay as the FCS Bison team defeated Kansas 6–3. Although Kansas took a lead in the first quarter with a field goal, the Bison scored 2 field goals, 1 in the first half and the other in the second, to knock off Jayhawks. Kansas had 3 turnovers in the game, causing the Bison to lead in time of possession.

=== Georgia Tech ===
	1	2	3	4	Total
#15 Yellow Jackets	7	10	0	8	25
Jayhawks	7	7	7	7	28

Trying to rebound after the loss against the FCS Bison, Kansas was considered an underdog against the heavily favored, 15th ranked, Georgia Tech. Redshirt Freshman Jordan Webb took over the starting QB role and true Freshman James Sims was introduced at running back. In the first half, Kansas scored two touchdowns, but the Yellow Jackets were ahead by a field goal at halftime, 17–14. However, in the third quarter, Kansas would score an unanswered touchdown to take the lead at 21–17. In the first drive of the fourth quarter, the Jayhawks would score yet another touchdown. However, Georgia Tech scored a touchdown in the fourth quarter to try to pull off a comeback. Then, with a minute to play in regulation, Georgia Tech's drive stopped with a turnover on downs that ended the Yellow Jackets' hopes of winning. The final would be 28–25, with Kansas winning. This would be the first time since 2008 that Kansas defeated a ranked opponent, defeating the then #11 Missouri Tigers 40–37. The win remains (as of the conclusion of the 2021 season) the Jayhawks last win over a ranked opponent.

=== Southern Miss ===
	1	2	3	4	Total
Jayhawks	0	3	7	6	16
Golden Eagles	7	14	7	3	31

=== New Mexico State ===
	1	2	3	4	Total
Aggies	0	7	0	9	16
Jayhawks	7	14	14	7	42

=== Baylor ===
	1	2	3	4	Total
Jayhawks	0	7	0	0	7
Bears	10	17	21	7	55

=== Kansas State ===
	1	2	3	4	Total
Wildcats	3	28	21	7	59
Jayhawks	0	0	0	7	7

=== Texas A&M ===
	1	2	3	4	Total
Aggies	14	17	7	7	45
Jayhawks	3	7	0	0	10

=== Iowa State ===
	1	2	3	4	Total
Jayhawks	6	3	0	7	16
Cyclones	0	7	21	0	28

=== Colorado ===
	1	2	3	4	Total
Buffaloes	14	21	3	7	45
Jayhawks	3	7	7	35	52

=== Nebraska ===
	1	2	3	4	Total
Jayhawks	0	0	3	0	3
#9 Cornhuskers	7	7	3	3	20

=== Oklahoma State ===
	1	2	3	4	Total
Cowboys	10	10	14	14	48
Jayhawks	14	0	0	0	14

=== Missouri ===
	1	2	3	4	Total
Jayhawks	0	0	7	0	7
#15 Tigers	14	7	7	7	35

== Awards and honors ==
Justin Springer

- Big 12 Defensive Player of the Week (week 2) - 15 tackles, 1 sack against #15 Georgia Tech

D.J. Beshears

- Big 12 Special Teams Player of the Week (week 4)
