= 2010 Texas Longhorns football team =

American college football season

2010 Texas Longhorns football
- Conference: Big 12 Conference
- South
- Record: 5–7 (2–6 Big 12)
- Head coach: Mack Brown (13th season)
- Offensive coordinator: Greg Davis (13th season)
- Defensive coordinator: Will Muschamp (3rd season)
- Home stadium: Darrell K Royal–Texas Memorial Stadium (Capacity: 100,119)

2010 Big 12 Conference football standings
	Conf.			Overall
Team	W		L	W		L
North Division
No. 20 Nebraska xy	6	–	2	10	–	4
No. 18 Missouri x	6	–	2	10	–	3
Kansas State	3	–	5	7	–	6
Iowa State	3	–	5	5	–	7
Colorado	2	–	6	5	–	7
Kansas	1	–	7	3	–	9
South Division
No. 6 Oklahoma xy$	6	–	2	12	–	2
No. 13 Oklahoma State x	6	–	2	11	–	2
No. 19 Texas A&M x	6	–	2	9	–	4
Baylor	4	–	4	7	–	6
Texas Tech	3	–	5	8	–	5
Texas	2	–	6	5	–	7
Championship: Oklahoma 23, Nebraska 20
$ – BCS representative as conference champion; x – Division champion/co-champions; y – Championship game participant; Rankings from AP Poll

The 2010 Texas Longhorns football team (variously "Texas", "UT", the "Longhorns", or the "'Horns") represented the University of Texas at Austin in the 2010 NCAA Division I FBS football season. The team was coached by Mack Brown, in his 13th year at Texas. Longhorns played their home games in Darrell K Royal–Texas Memorial Stadium and are members of the south division of the Big 12 Conference. Texas finished the season 5–7, 2–6 in Big 12 play. It was the Longhorns' first losing season since 1997.

Sam Acho, winner of the Campbell Trophy that year, was the sole selection to the All-Big 12 first team. His brother Emmanuel Acho and defensive teammates Keenan Robinson, Aaron Williams and Curtis Brown were 2nd team selections. Sam Acho was the only All-American - garnering a 2nd Team Selection by the Walter Camp Foundation and 3rd team by the AP.

== Schedule ==
Date	Time	Opponent	Rank	Site	TV	Result	Attendance	Source
September 4	2:30 p.m.	vs. Rice*	No. 5	Reliant Stadium; Houston, TX (rivalry)	ESPN	W 34–17	70,445	
September 11	6:00 p.m.	Wyoming*	No. 5	Darrell K Royal–Texas Memorial Stadium; Austin, TX	FSN	W 34–7	101,339	
September 18	7:00 p.m.	at Texas Tech	No. 6	Jones AT&T Stadium; Lubbock, TX (rivalry)	ABC/ESPN2	W 24–14	60,454 (Note: Denotes the largest crowd to watch a football game at Jones AT&T Stadium (beating a previous record set during the 2009 Texas Tech Red Raiders season against the Texas A&M Aggies).)	
September 25	2:30 p.m.	UCLA*	No. 7	Darrell K Royal–Texas Memorial Stadium; Austin, TX	ABC/ESPN	L 12–34	101,437 (Note: Denotes the largest crowd to watch a football game at Darrell K Royal–Texas Memorial Stadium (beating a previous record set during the 2009 Texas Longhorns season against the Kansas Jayhawks).)	
October 2	2:30 p.m.	vs. No. 8 Oklahoma	No. 21	Cotton Bowl; Dallas, TX (Red River Rivalry)	ABC/ESPN	L 20–28	96,009	
October 16	2:30 p.m.	at No. 5 Nebraska		Memorial Stadium; Lincoln, NE	ABC	W 20–13	85,648	
October 23	11:00 a.m.	Iowa State^{†}	No. 22	Darrell K Royal–Texas Memorial Stadium; Austin, TX	FSN	L 21–28	100,142	
October 30	6:00 p.m.	No. 25 Baylor		Darrell K Royal–Texas Memorial Stadium; Austin, TX (rivalry)	FSN	L 22–30	100,452	
November 6	7:00 p.m.	at Kansas State		Bill Snyder Family Football Stadium; Manhattan, KS	ESPN2	L 14–39	46,734	
November 13	7:00 p.m.	No. 12 Oklahoma State		Darrell K Royal–Texas Memorial Stadium; Austin, TX	ABC	L 16–33	100,659	
November 20	2:30 p.m.	Florida Atlantic*		Darrell K Royal–Texas Memorial Stadium; Austin, TX	FSN+	W 51–17	99,799	
November 25	7:00 p.m.	No. 17 Texas A&M		Darrell K Royal–Texas Memorial Stadium; Austin, TX (rivalry)	ESPN	L 17–24	100,752	
*Non-conference game; ^{†}Homecoming; Rankings from AP Poll released prior to the game; All times are in Central time

== Game summaries ==
=== Rice ===
	1	2	3	4	Total
#5 Longhorns	0	24	7	3	34
Owls	3	7	0	7	17

The Rice Owls and Texas met in 2010 for the 92nd time. Texas held a 69–21–1 lead in the series, which began in 1914. For the Longhorns this series ranks fourth in number of games played, behind Texas A&M, Oklahoma, and Baylor. The two schools were once conference foes in the Southwest Conference and have maintained a rivalry despite the fact that Texas enjoys a sizable lead in the series. President John F. Kennedy alluded to the lopsidedness of the rivalry in his 1962 speech on America's space program: "But why, some say, the Moon? ... And they may well ask why climb the highest mountain. Why, 35 years ago, fly the Atlantic? Why does Rice play Texas? ... We choose to go to the Moon ... and do the other things, not because they are easy, but because they are hard." In addition to continuing a traditional rivalry, playing Rice in a home and away series allows for Texas to play games in Houston, Texas, an important recruiting base for UT, which has a significant Texas Exes alumni population. During the game, the Owls took an early lead with a field goal in the first quarter. Rice had also forced a turnover on downs. By the end of the first quarter, Rice was in the lead at 3–0. However, in the second quarter, Texas scored 3 touchdowns and 1 field goal. 2 of those touchdowns were rushes from Tre' Newton and the other was from a fumble return. By halftime, Texas was in the lead 24–10. In the second half, both Texas and Rice had calmed down, scoring 10 and 7 points, respectively. The final score would be 34–17, with Texas having the upper hand in total yardage. The game was played at Reliant Stadium.

=== Wyoming ===
	1	2	3	4	Total
Cowboys	0	7	0	0	7
#5 Longhorns	3	17	7	7	34

The Wyoming Cowboys and the Texas Longhorns last met in the previous season, with Texas winning 41–10 with Colt McCoy as quarterback. In total, the 2 teams had met on the gridiron 3 times with Texas winning all 3 meetings. In the first quarter, the Texas offense struggled to get much yardage and points, only settling for a field goal. In the second quarter, the Longhorns got back on track, scoring 2 touchdowns and one field goal. Wyoming also scored in the second quarter to take a short 1 point lead, but that would be their only score for the entire game. At halftime, Texas was leading at 20–7. In the third quarter, Texas scored yet another touchdown. Cody Johnson scored the final TD for Texas in the final minute of the game that would sum up to be the final, 34–7.

=== Texas Tech ===
	1	2	3	4	Total
#6 Longhorns	14	0	3	7	24
Red Raiders	7	7	0	0	14

Texas Tech and Texas have met 59 times since 1928. In 1996 the exchange of a traveling trophy, the Chancellor's Spurs, began when both universities' administration included a chancellor position. Texas leads the series 10–4 since the Chancellor's Spurs have been exchanged. Texas also leads the all-time series, 44–15. This year's game will mark the 60th time the two teams have met.

=== UCLA ===
	1	2	3	4	Total
Bruins	0	13	14	7	34
#7 Longhorns	3	0	3	6	12

1997 was the last time Texas and UCLA played at Darrell K Royal–Texas Memorial Stadium. UCLA blew out Texas 66–3 under coach John Mackovic. The game would turn out to be Texas' biggest home loss in school history and second worst all-time. At the end of that season, Mackovic was fired.

Seeking revenge, Texas took the lead late in the first quarter with a field goal. However, the Bruins would respond in the second quarter to take the lead at 13–3. Texas, punished with turnovers and penalties, would lose the game 34–12 after failing to complete a full comeback. This would be Texas' first regular season loss since facing Texas Tech in 2008, their first home loss since facing Kansas State in 2007 and their worst home loss under Mack Brown. A stadium-record crowd of 101,437 saw the game.

=== Oklahoma ===
	1	2	3	4	Total
#21 Longhorns	7	0	3	10	20
#8 Sooners	14	7	0	7	28

Texas came into the game trying to win their third consecutive Red River Rivalry match. The Sooners scored twice in the first quarter, on a DeMarco Murray rushing touchdown and Kenny Stills receiving touchdown. DJ Monroe then ran for a 60-yard touchdown for the Longhorns late in the first quarter to cut the lead to 14–7. Entering the fourth quarter, the Sooners had a 21–10 lead.

In the fourth quarter, the Sooners padded the lead to 28–10 with another Murray touchdown. The Longhorns cut the lead to 28–20 with a rushing touchdown and field goal. The Sooners had to punt with 1:02 left, giving the Longhorns hope at a chance of scoring again. However, returner Aaron Williams muffed the punt and the Sooners recovered the ball. This was the second loss in a row for the Longhorns.

=== Nebraska ===
	1	2	3	4	Total
Longhorns	10	7	3	0	20
#5 Cornhuskers	0	3	3	7	13

Texas came into the game as heavy underdogs as the Cornhuskers sought revenge for the loss against the Longhorns in the final seconds of the 2009 Big 12 Championship Game. In the first quarter, Texas came out explosively with a field goal and the first rushing touchdown by Garrett Gilbert for the season, while Nebraska was held scoreless as Taylor Martinez was unable to make a big play. In the second quarter, Alex Henery would score a field goal on the Nebraska side, while Garrett Gilbert would score another touchdown. By the end of the half, chances of winning looked grim for the Huskers as Texas led 17–3. Texas held the 2-score lead into the end of the third quarter, leading 20–6. A botched kick by Justin Tucker was returned 95 yards by the Nebraska receiving team, narrowing the score to 20–13. However, Texas would hold off with the win.

=== Iowa State ===
	1	2	3	4	Total
Cyclones	7	7	7	7	28
#22 Longhorns	0	3	3	15	21

Texas came out flat. Iowa State ran over the Longhorns for the first 47 minutes of the game. Texas tried to keep it close but the Cyclones were too much in the end and captured their first ever victory against the Longhorns.

=== Baylor ===
	1	2	3	4	Total
#25 Bears	3	7	7	13	30
Longhorns	3	9	7	3	22

Texas' first loss to Baylor in the Mack Brown era (1998–present) and first home loss to Baylor since 1991. The Texas offense was stymied as Justin Tucker was forced to kick five field goals in the game. Texas's only touchdown was a 20-yard scramble by Garrett Gilbert. Baylor quarterback and future Heisman trophy winner, Robert Griffin III passed for 219 yards, including a 59-yard strike to Terrance Williams. The pass only covered about ten yards in the air but Williams made Texas safety Blake Gideon miss and had no one else to beat over the final 45 yards to the end zone. Baylor running back Jay Finley also had a 69-yard run late in the third quarter. Texas still holds a commanding lead in the all-time series against the Bears, 73–23–4.

=== Kansas State ===
	1	2	3	4	Total
Longhorns	0	0	0	14	14
Wildcats	10	14	15	0	39

This season's reoccurring theme continued. Texas put itself in another major hole with five offensive turnovers and a thirty-nine point deficit after three quarters. Quarterback Garrett Gilbert struggled, throwing five interceptions. As a result, Texas was handed its third straight defeat on the season and also in the head-to-head series against Kansas State. Texas now trails in this wild, all-time series versus the Wildcats, 5–6.

=== Oklahoma State ===
	1	2	3	4	Total
#12 Cowboys	3	23	7	0	33
Longhorns	3	0	0	13	16

In the first quarter, Texas was able to hold Oklahoma State to 3 points, but gave up 23 in the second quarter including a 67-yard touchdown pass by Brandon Weeden. Down 33–3 at the beginning of the 4th quarter, Texas was only able to cut the Cowboys' lead from 30 to 17 with 2 touchdowns. The loss put Texas in a situation of must-wins to become bowl eligible.

=== Florida Atlantic ===
	1	2	3	4	Total
Owls	7	0	10	0	17
Longhorns	7	17	6	21	51

In the first quarter, the Longhorns went for it on 4th and goal but Cody Johnson was stopped short at the 1-yard line. Then Florida Atlantic Owls quarterback Jeff Van Camp threw an interception to Blake Gideon which led to Texas scoring on a Cody Johnson 1-yard touchdown run. FAU came back with 1:20 left in the first. Jeff Van Camp threw a 56-yard Touchdown to Rob Housler. With 13:52 in the second quarter, Garrett Gilbert threw a 63-yard touchdown pass to James Kirkendoll. With 8 minutes to go in the half, Justin Tucker kicked a 22-yard field goal to put the Longhorns ahead 17–7. At the end of the half, Garrett Gilbert threw a Hail Mary to Malcolm Williams, catching the ball in the end-zone with no time left in the first half. Texas never looked back in the second half and went on to win 51–17.

=== Texas A&M ===
	1	2	3	4	Total
#17 Aggies	0	7	17	0	24
Longhorns	0	7	7	3	17

Von Miller sacked Garret Gilbert twice and intercepted a pass, Cyrus Gray had TD runs of 84 and 48 yards while piling up 223 yards rushing for A&M, and Texas was left bowl ineligible at 5–7. Texas had played in a bowl each year since losing to Texas A&M in 1997.

== Personnel ==
=== Depth chart ===
Defense

FS
Christian Scott
Kenny Vaccaro
⋅

WLB	MLB	SLB
Keenan Robinson	Dustin Earnest	Emmanuel Acho
Emmanuel Acho	Jared Norton	Dravannti Johnson
⋅	⋅	⋅

SS
Blake Gideon
Adrian Philips
⋅

CB
Curtis Brown
A.J. White
⋅

DE	DT	DT	DE
Eddie Jones	Alex Okafor	Kheeston Randall	Sam Acho
Jackson Jeffcoat	Tyrell Higgins	Calvin Howell	Reggie Wilson
⋅	⋅	Ashton Dorsey	⋅

CB
Aaron Williams
Chykie Brown
Carrington Byndom

Offense

WR
James Kirkendoll
Mike Davis
⋅

WR
Malcolm Williams
Darius White
⋅

LT	LG	C	RG	RT
Kyle Hix	Michael Huey	David Snow	Mason Walters	Britt Mitchell
Mark Buchanan	Thomas Ashcraft	Garrett Porter	Trey Hopkins	Paden Kelly
⋅	⋅	⋅	⋅	⋅

TE
Greg Smith
Barrett Matthews
⋅

WR
Marquise Goodwin
John Chiles
⋅

QB
Garrett Gilbert
Case McCoy
⋅

RB
Fozzy Whittaker
Tre' Newton
D.J. Monroe

Special teams
PK Justin Tucker
PK William Russ
P John Gold
P Justin Tucker
KR Marquise Goodwin
PR Curtis Brown
LS Greg Smith
H Cade McCary

=== Roster ===
2010 Texas Longhorns roster

Quarterbacks

- 7 Garrett Gilbert – Sophomore
- 6 Case McCoy – Freshman
- 18 Connor Wood – Freshman
- 19 John Paul Floyd – Sophomore

Running backs

- 2 Vondrell McGee – Senior
- 28 Foswhitt Whittaker – Junior
- 45 Luke Padgett – Junior
- 32 Traylon Shead – Freshman
- 25 Jeremy Hills – Junior
- 26 D.J. Monroe – Sophomore
- 21 Chris Whaley – (redshirt) Freshman
- 23 Tre' Newton – Sophomore
- 31 Cody Johnson – Junior
- 43 Heath Hohmann – Freshman

Fullbacks

- 41 Jamison Berryhill – Sophomore

== Coaching staff ==
Name	Position
Mack Brown	Head coach (13th)
Greg Davis	Offensive Coordinator/Quarterbacks (13th)
Will Muschamp	Defensive Coordinator/Linebackers (3rd)
Duane Akina	Asst. Head Coach/Defensive Backs (10th)
Major Applewhite	Asst. Head Coach/Running Backs (3rd)
Bruce Chambers	Recruiting Coordinator/Tight Ends (13th)
Oscar Giles	Defensive Ends (6th)

Greg Davis resigned after the season while it was announced offensive line coach Mac McWhorter and defensive line coach Mike Tolleson would be leaving the program.

On December 11, 2010, Will Muschamp resigned as Texas defensive coordinator, and became the head coach at the University of Florida.

== Rankings ==
Ranking movements Legend: ██ Increase in ranking ██ Decrease in ranking — = Not ranked RV = Received votes ( ) = First-place votes
	Week															
Poll	Pre	1	2	3	4	5	6	7	8	9	10	11	12	13	14	Final
AP	5 (1)	5 (1)	6 (1)	7 (1)	21	RV	RV	22	—	—	—	—	—	—	—	—
Coaches	4	4	4	4	16	RV	RV	22	RV	—	—	—	—	—	—	—
Harris	Not released						RV	22	RV	—	—	—	—	—	—	Not released
BCS	Not released							19	—	—	—	—	—	—	—	Not released

The Longhorns entered the season ranked fifth and fourth in the AP and Coaches' Polls, respectively. For the first 3 games, Texas would drop 1 place per game in the AP Poll due to slightly poor performances, while the Coaches' Polls would remain the same. However, after losing to unranked UCLA at home, Texas would drop significantly by 14 spots on the AP poll and 10 spots on the Coaches' Poll, hurting Texas' aim for a BCS Bowl. After losing against Oklahoma in week 5, Texas would fall out of the rankings for the first time in 10 years and remain so for the next bye week. Texas resumed a ranked placement after a win at then No. 5 Nebraska in week 7; however, Texas fell from the ranks again just a week later after another unprecedented home defeat, this time to Iowa State. After suffering their first ever loss in school history to Iowa State, Texas lost at home again in week 9, this time to Baylor. It was Baylor's first win against a Mack Brown coached Texas team and first win in Austin since 1991. In week 10, Texas lost its third straight game at unranked Kansas State. Texas lost its fourth straight and sixth of last seven in week 11 against the Oklahoma State Cowboys. Texas lost its last game of the season on Thanksgiving Day at home in Austin to the Texas A&M Aggies; in doing so, the Longhorns finished 5–7 and failed to qualify for a post season bowl game for the first time since 1997. Texas will not be ranked in either of the two major polls at the end of the 2010 season also for the first time since 1997.

== Recruiting ==
College recruiting
Name	Hometown	School	Height	Weight	40^{‡}	Commit date
Malcolm Brown; RB	Cibolo, Texas	Bryon M. Steele HS	6 ft 0 in (1.83 m)	210 lb (95 kg)	–	Aug 18, 2010
Malcolm Brown; RB	Recruit ratings: Scout: Rivals: ESPN: (86)					
Quandre Diggs; CB	Angleton, Texas	Angleton HS	5 ft 10 in (1.78 m)	190 lb (86 kg)	4.4	Feb 13, 2010
Quandre Diggs; CB	Recruit ratings: Scout: Rivals: ESPN: (84)					
Desmond Jackson; DT	Houston, Texas	Westfield HS	6 ft 1 in (1.85 m)	270 lb (120 kg)	5.0	Feb 13, 2010
Desmond Jackson; DT	Recruit ratings: Scout: Rivals: ESPN: (83)					
Steve Edmond; ILB			N/A	N/A	Feb 13, 2010	
Steve Edmond; ILB	Recruit ratings: Scout: Rivals: ESPN: (81)					
Mykkele Thompson; ATH	San Antonio, Texas	John Paul Stevens HS	6 ft 1 in (1.85 m)	275 lb (125 kg)	4.5	Feb 13, 2010
Mykkele Thompson; ATH	Recruit ratings: Scout: Rivals: ESPN: (79)					
Miles Onyegbule; WR	Arlington, Texas	Arlington HS	6 ft 3 in (1.91 m)	200 lb (91 kg)	4.5	Feb 13, 2010
Miles Onyegbule; WR	Recruit ratings: Scout: Rivals: ESPN: (79)					
Joe Bergeron; FB	Mesquite, Texas	North Mesquite HS	6 ft 0 in (1.83 m)	237 lb (108 kg)	4.95	Feb 13, 2010
Joe Bergeron; FB	Recruit ratings: Scout: Rivals: ESPN: (78)					
Josh Cochran; OT	Hallsville, Texas	Hallsville HS	6 ft 6 in (1.98 m)	270 lb (120 kg)	–	Feb 13, 2010
Josh Cochran; OT	Recruit ratings: Scout: Rivals: ESPN: (78)					
Taylor Doyle; OT	Austin, Texas	Lake Travis HS	6 ft 5 in (1.96 m)	265 lb (120 kg)	–	Feb 12, 2010
Taylor Doyle; OT	Recruit ratings: Scout: Rivals: ESPN: (77)					
Marcus Hutchins; OG	DeSoto, Texas	DeSoto HS	6 ft 3 in (1.91 m)	255 lb (116 kg)	–	Feb 13, 2010
Marcus Hutchins; OG	Recruit ratings: Scout: Rivals: ESPN: (77)					
Overall recruit ranking:
‡ Refers to 40-yard dash; Note: In many cases, Scout, Rivals, 247Sports, On3, and ESPN may conflict in their listings of height, weight and 40 time.; In these cases, the average was taken. ESPN grades are on a 100-point scale.; Sources: "2011 Texas Football Commitment List". Rivals.; "Texas College Football Team Recruiting Prospects". Scout.; "Texas Longhorns Big 12 Conference". ESPN.; "Scout.com Team Recruiting Rankings". Scout.; "2011 Team Ranking". Rivals.com.
