= South Oak Cliff High School =

School in Dallas, Texas, United States

Location
- 3601 South Marsalis Avenue; Dallas, Texas 75216; United States; 32.699627°N 96.815460°W

Information
- Type: Public, Secondary
- Motto: To provide academic and social opportunities that will enable students to use a variety technologies, accept and excel in challenging situations, and appreciate individuals of diversity.
- School district: Dallas Independent School District
- Principal: Dr. Willie F. Johnson
- Teaching staff: 104.19 (FTE)
- Grades: 9-12
- Enrollment: 1,537 (2023-2024)
- Student to teacher ratio: 14.75
- Colors: Old Gold and White
- Nickname: Golden Bears
- Trustee dist.: 5, Lew Blackburn
- Area: 5, Vickie Mitchell
- Website: www.dallasisd.org/soc

South Oak Cliff High School (colloquially referred to as SOC, pronounced "sock") is a public secondary school located in the Oak Cliff area of Dallas, Texas, United States. South Oak Cliff High School enrolls students in grades 9-12 and is a part of the Dallas Independent School District (DISD).

The school serves the area of Dallas known as "South Oak Cliff" (generally east of Interstate 35E and south of Illinois Avenue, though the area was never technically part of Oak Cliff). The school also previously had some students who lived in the former Wilmer-Hutchins ISD boundaries. DISD began to take in WHISD-zoned students during the 2005–2006 school year, and at that time the entire Wilmer-Hutchins High School senior class attended South Oak Cliff.

In 2015, the school was rated "Improvement Required" by the Texas Education Agency.

== History ==
South Oak Cliff opened in 1952 as the first DISD high school to be constructed in almost 15 years (Lincoln High opened in 1939.) The school served developing areas of south and east Oak Cliff. In the first year only a few hundred students enrolled, but the school grew rapidly as new housing developments were completed along Kiest Boulevard and Ledbetter Drive. In the late 1950s, before Kimball and Carter high schools were opened, SOC was one of the largest high schools in the city. For its first 13 years SOC was designated a "white" high school by DISD, but the neighborhoods surrounding the school began to change rapidly to African-American in the early 1960s. Many of the schools that fed into SOC (Holmes and Zumwalt junior high schools and Miller, Stone, Pease, Bushman and Mills elementary schools) were converted to "negro" elementary schools in the late 1960s.

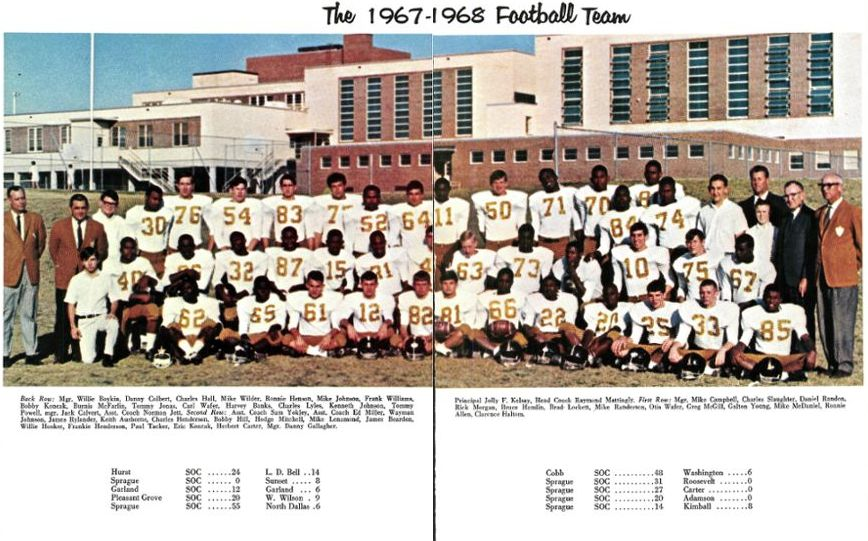
This picture of the 1967-1968 SOC football team illustrates the school's changing demographics

Roosevelt High School was opened in north Oak Cliff 1963 to serve the growing African-American student population, but at the beginning of the 1966-1967 school year, DISD was forced to desegregate its high schools and black students enrolled at SOC for the first time.

Between 1966 and 1970 the student body changed from nearly 100 percent white to almost 100 percent African-American. This type of racial turnover was common in the US during the white flight era of the 1960s, but it was rare to see it happen in such a newly developed area. Most of the homes, businesses and shopping centers in this area of Oak Cliff were less than ten years old when the racial changes began. There was a period when SOC had over 2,000 students.

After the A. Maceo Smith High School moved in 1989, the attendance boundaries between Smith and South Oak Cliff shifted, with students zoned to Stone Middle School and Zumwalt Middle School, except for students also zoned to Bushman Elementary, moving from SOC to Smith, and students zoned to Storey Middle School, except for those who began their educations at Marshall and Oliver elementaries, would be zoned to SOC.

In 2005, after the closure of the Wilmer-Hutchins Independent School District, what would have been the entire senior class of Wilmer-Hutchins High School was sent to South Oak Cliff. SOC and other DISD schools absorbed the remaining WHISD high school students.

In 2011, the district re-opened Wilmer Hutchins and converted A. Maceo Smith into a technology magnet. Some former WHISD zones covered by South Oak Cliff were rezoned to Wilmer-Hutchins. South Oak Cliff absorbed parts of the former A. Maceo Smith boundary.

By 2016 the district agreed to remodel the SOC building. At first the renovation was to only cover the inside, the plumbing system, and the roof, with $13 million in funding. The funding and scope increased after advocacy from the SOC community and student walkouts. In February 2016 DISD agreed to up the amount to $25 million. The following May it increased to $42 million. Finally the board voted 6-3 to increase it to $52 million in October 2016. The renovation is to include refurbished classrooms, new hallways with an atrium and athletic facilities. The latter category consists of a gymnasium for athletic competitions that has a capacity of 2,000 people, as well as another weight room and an auxiliary gymnasium.

At first the students were to be housed in temporary buildings on the SOC site, but SOC community members insisted that the students be housed on another site during renovations. In January 2018 students were moved to Village Fair, along Interstate 35E, previously used as a shopping complex, so the permanent building may be remodeled. DISD converted the facility, with 23,000 square feet (2,100 m^{2}) of school space, for the stated purpose for $2.2 million. Normally it was used for the alternative school but to accommodate SOC that school was moved to Nolan Estes Plaza. The temporary facility has a band hall, a dance room, and two rooms for science classes. The basketball team, during the renovation period, is using Sprague Field House as its practice area. The renovations of the permanent SOC campus continued into the 2019-2020 school year, and students remained at Village Fair.

In January 2018 the school had about 1,200 students. For the 2019-2020 school year the administration expected that the enrollment would be 963, but by October was 1,322, above expectations.

In December 2019, $52 million worth of renovations were completed on the original campus and students began classes there beginning in January 2020.

== Extracurricular activities ==
=== Athletics ===
The South Oak Cliff Golden Bears compete in the following sports: Baseball, Basketball, Cross Country, Football, Golf, Soccer, Softball, Swimming and Diving, Tennis, Track and Field, Volleyball, and Wrestling.

==== Football ====
South Oak Cliff has won three state championships in football, doing so in 2021, 2022 and 2025.

The team has missed the state playoffs only once in 25 seasons and as of 2022, with Jamarcus Ingram signing with the Buffalo Bills, has produced at least 26 players who have gone on to play in the National Football League, which is the most in Texas. The Pro-Reference website has yet to be updated to include Ingram or Jacquies Smith. (Another SOC Alum, Marvin Terry, has been invited to the Jets minicamp but yet to sign a contract)

In the 2021 football season, SOC beat Liberty Hill 23-14 for their first state title in school history. With this win, SOC became the first Dallas ISD school to win a state championship in football since 1950 (Carter defeated Converse Judson in the 1988 Class AAAAA final, but the University Interscholastic League stripped Carter of the championship over two years after the game was played, due to the alleged changing of one grade of one player; which ultimately came down to one contested assignment).

SOC won their second consecutive state championship in 2022 by defeating the Port Neches-Groves Indians 34-24, becoming the first Dallas ISD high school to win back-to-back football state championships.

After losing back-to-back state championship games in 2023 and 2024, the Golden Bears won their third state championship in football in 2025, defeating the Randle Lions 35-19.

==== Basketball ====
On the court, SOC's boys' basketball team won six state championships, 1977, 1992, 2005, 2006, 2007 and 2008.

Off the court, however, the team was forced to forfeit the titles in 2005 and 2006 after teachers were found to have changed failing grades in order to maintain the eligibility of basketball players.

SOC's girls' basketball team has won four state championships: 1977, 1978, 1980, and 1985. Gary Blair helped start the girls' basketball team in 1973. In his 7 seasons as coach, Blair's teams won 3 state championships, lost the 1979 championship game by 2 points, and compiled an overall record of 239-18. Blair now coaches the women's basketball team at Texas A&M.

At least three women who played for SOC have gone on to play in the Women's National Basketball Association.

At least 19 male SOC players accepted college basketball scholarships between 2005 and 2020. Three alumni men have gone from playing at SOC to playing in the NBA. A 4th, Dennis Rodman, never actually played high school basketball but went on to a pro basketball career that led him into the Naismith Memorial Basketball Hall of Fame.

== School uniforms ==
SOC has chosen to institute mandatory school uniforms consisting of white, black or gold tops and khaki or black bottoms.

The Texas Education Agency specified that the parents and/or guardians of students zoned to a school with uniforms may apply for a waiver to opt out of the uniform policy so their children do not have to wear the uniform, parents must specify "bona fide" reasons, such as religious reasons or philosophical objections.

== Feeder patterns ==
Seven elementary schools (Harrell Budd, Lisbon, Thomas L. Marsalis, Clara Oliver, Clinton P. Russell, Erasmo Sequin, and Robert L. Thornton) feed into two middle schools (Boude Storey and Sarah Zumwalt), which feed into South Oak Cliff High School.

== Controversy ==
A 2008 investigation within the Dallas school district's Office of Professional Responsibility found that then-principal Donald Moten as well as other school officials staged cage fights among troubled students, making them fight in a steel utility cage inside a boys locker room. The investigation showed that Moten and other employees "knew of the practice, allowed it to go on for a time, and failed to report it".

South Oak Cliff High was stripped of its 2005 and 2006 state basketball championships after investigators determined Moten had coerced teachers into changing athletes' grades. District reports also confirmed unauthorized pep rally fundraisers that Moten used to fund personal gambling trips. Moten had a previous checkered work history at the Dallas Police Department – one that included staging his own kidnapping and the fatal shooting of an elderly crime-watch volunteer. Moten was moved from South Oak Cliff High to Jackson Elementary School in 2006, and resigned from the district in 2008.

== Notable alumni ==
- Ira Albright '77, Northeastern State University; former NFL fullback and defensive lineman
- Egypt Allen '82, TCU, former NFL defensive back
- Jackie Allen '65, Baylor University; former NFL defensive back
- Andre Anderson '74; All Conference, New Mexico State; former CFL defensive tackle
- Darrell Arthur '06, McDonald's All American; national champion at University of Kansas; former NBA power forward
- Tony Battie '94; all-time leader in blocked shots, Texas Tech; former NBA player; television analyst
- Lincoln "Link" Browder '83; R&B singer, songwriter & producer
- David Brown '78; Superintendent of the Chicago Police Department; former chief, Dallas Police Department
- David Burns '77; co-conference player of the year, Saint Louis University; former NBA guard
- Michael Cannon '83, Texas high school record, 400 meters; All-American sprinter, TCU
- Danny Colbert '69; University of Tulsa; former NFL defensive back
- Tim Collier '72; NAIA national championship at East Texas State University; former NFL cornerback
- Michael Downs '77; All Conference, Rice University; former NFL All-Pro safety
- LaTarence Dunbar '98; TCU record, 60 meter high hurdles; former NFL wide receiver
- Sheddric Fields '92, Gatorade National Boys High School Track & Field Athlete of the Year; All-American long jumper, University of Houston
- Chryste Gaines '88, Gatorade National Girls High School Track & Field Athlete of the Year; Stanford University; gold-medalist, 1996 Olympic sprint relay; bronze medalist, 2000 Olympic sprint relay
- Snuff Garrett '56; record producer; member, Texas Radio Hall of Fame
- Rod Gerald '75; All Big Ten quarterback, Orange Bowl MVP, Ohio State
- Fran Harris '82; NCAA basketball champion at the University of Texas; guard for WNBA champion; sports personality
- Nekeshia Henderson '91; All Conference, University of Texas; former WNBA basketball guard
- Lendy Holmes '04; University of Oklahoma; former NFL defensive back
- Charles Hudson '77; Prairie View A&M; former MLB pitcher
- Johnny Humphrey '11, Prairie View A&M University, former wide receiver
- Ja'Marcus Ingram; Texas Tech, University at Buffalo; NFL defensive back, Buffalo Bills
- Alcy Jackson '73; wide receiver, high hurdler, Baylor University
- Kevin Jennings '22; quarterback for the SMU Mustangs
- Rod Jones '82; All American 400 meter sprinter, SMU; former NFL cornerback
- Joe King '86; Oklahoma State; former NFL defensive back; country music singer
- Mike Livingston '64; SMU; former NFL quarterback and Super Bowl champion
- Harvey Martin '68; East Texas State University; former NFL defensive player of the year; All Pro defensive lineman, Super Bowl champion and Super Bowl MVP
- Malik Muhammad '23; cornerback for the Texas Longhorns
- Wayne Morris '72; SMU; former NFL running back
- Jack Nance '62; American Conservatory Theater; actor, Eraserhead, Twin Peaks
- Guy Reese '57; SMU; former NFL defensive lineman; NFL All-Rookie team
- Oscar Roan '70; SMU, UCLA; former NFL tight end
- Dennis Rodman '79; Southeast Oklahoma State; former NBA power forward; Naismith Memorial Basketball Hall of Fame
- Durwood Roquemore '78; Texas A&I, All American for NAIA national champions; former NFL defensive back
- Jacquies Smith '08; 2nd team All Big 12, University of Missouri; former NFL defensive end
- Ken Smith, '71; University of Tulsa; former ABA forward
- Gary Spann '81; TCU; former NFL linebacker
- Karl Sweetan '61; Wake Forest; former NFL quarterback.
- Malcolm Walker '61; All American and Academic All Conference at Rice University; former NFL center
- Ricky Wesson '73; led conference in total offense and touchdown passes as quarterback at SMU; former NFL defensive back
- Ken Williams '74; led NCAA in rebounding, 1978, University of North Texas
