= Jacquies Smith =

American gridiron football player (born 1990)

Texas Tech Red Raiders football
- Title: Outside linebackers coach

Personal information
- Born: March 18, 1990 (age 36); Dallas, Texas, U.S.
- Listed height: 6 ft 2 in (1.88 m)
- Listed weight: 260 lb (118 kg)

Career information
- Position: Defensive end (No. 56, 95, 96, 93)
- High school: South Oak Cliff (Dallas)
- College: Missouri
- NFL draft: 2012: undrafted

Career history

Playing
- Miami Dolphins (2012)*; Hamilton Tiger-Cats (2012); New York Jets (2012–2013)*; Buffalo Bills (2013–2014)*; Tampa Bay Buccaneers (2014–2017); Detroit Lions (2017); Arizona Cardinals (2018); Oakland Raiders (2018); Seattle Dragons (2020)
- * Offseason or practice squad member only

Coaching
- Episcopal School of Dallas (2016–2018) Linebackers coach; Louisiana–Lafayette (2019–2022) Defensive quality control coach; Texas (2023) Assistant edge coach; Atlanta Falcons (2024–2025) Outside linebackers coach; Texas Tech (2026–present) Outside linebackers coach

Awards and highlights
- Second-team All-Big 12 (2011)

Career NFL statistics
- Total tackles: 43
- Sacks: 13.5
- Forced fumbles: 4
- Fumble recoveries: 4
- Defensive touchdowns: 1
- Stats at Pro Football Reference

Jacquies Smith (pronounced "Jack", born March 18, 1990) is an American former professional football player who was a defensive end in the National Football League (NFL). He played college football for the Missouri Tigers, and currently serves as the outside linebackers coach for the Texas Tech Red Raiders.

In the NFL in 2014, Smith recorded 6.5 sacks in 7 starts for the Tampa Bay Buccaneers. In 2015, Smith is credited with 7 quarterback sacks in the 11 games that he was healthy enough to play. During that season, a Bleacher Report article on Smith was entitled, "Jacquies Smith's Wild Ride to Become the NFL's Best Player You've Never Heard of."

== Early life ==
Smith grew up in an impoverished Oak Cliff section of Dallas, Texas and was raised by his grandmother. Through most of his childhood, Smith's father was incarcerated. His grandfather, Herbert Jones, was a U.S. Army veteran and prominent AAU coach whose players included such Dallas high school stars as Dennis Rodman and Larry Johnson. His grandfather specifically coached and encouraged his development as a football, track, and basketball player beginning when Smith was a young child.

Smith graduated from South Oak Cliff High School in 2008. He was an All-Midlands Region defensive lineman by PrepStar Magazine.

He was recruited to play football at the University of Missouri.

== College career ==
After his sophomore season at Missouri, Smith was All-Big 12, Honorable Mention. He was also named Missouri's Most Improved Defensive lineman during the spring practice session.

Smith was named 2nd-Team All-Big 12 after his junior season, and he also received the team's Jeff Rigman Outstanding Underclassman Leadership Award

Prior to his senior season, Smith was named to the "watch list" for both the Lombardi Award and the College Football Performance Award for the country's best defensive lineman. Smith was also named to variety of preseason all-star teams: Lindy's, Blue Ribbon, Athlon, and Phil Steele. An elbow injury limited action during that senior year, and Smith ended up the year without end-of-season accolades.

Smith went undrafted in the 2012 NFL Draft.

=== College statistics ===
Season	Team	GP	Solo	Ast	Cmb	TfL	Sck	Int	Yds	Avg	TD	PD	FR	Yds	TD	FF
2008	Missouri	1	22	24	46	3.0	1.0	0	0	0	0	2	0	0	0	0
2009	Missouri	13	23	16	39	4.0	1.5	1	43	43.0	1	0	0	0	0	0
2010	Missouri	6	11	7	18	5.0	2.0	0	0	0	0	3	2	53	1	2
2011	Missouri	11	21	18	39	9.0	5.0	0	0	0	0	4	1	0	0	3
Career		31	77	65	142	21.0	9.5	1	43	43.0	1	9	3	53	1	5

== Professional career ==
=== Miami Dolphins ===
On May 4, 2012, he signed with the Miami Dolphins as an undrafted free agent. On August 25, 2012, he was released among roster cuts.

=== Hamilton Tiger-Cats ===
On October 1, 2012, he signed with the Hamilton Tiger-Cats of the Canadian Football League. After a brief stay in Canada (one recorded sack for the Tiger-Cats), he returned to Texas to be available for NFL opportunities.

=== New York Jets ===
On December 4, 2012, he signed with the New York Jets to join the practice squad. On December 31, he was signed with the New York Jets to a reserve/future contract. He was released on August 31, 2013.

=== Buffalo Bills ===
Smith signed with the Buffalo Bills on December 30, 2013.

=== Tampa Bay Buccaneers ===
Smith signed with the Tampa Bay Buccaneers on September 10, 2014, after the team had waived rookie defensive end Scott Solomon. Since joining Tampa Bay Smith was able to go from a rotational defensive lineman to beating out William Gholston for the starting defensive end position. Under Lovie Smith's Tampa 2 system Smith has recorded 17 combined tackles, 13 solo tackles, 6.5 sacks, and 1 forced fumble for the 2014 season in only 8 starts.

On November 1, 2015, Smith left with an ankle injury in Week 8's matchup against the Atlanta Falcons. On November 6, 2015, the Tampa Bay Buccaneers ruled Smith out for Week 9's matchup against the New York Giants. On November 13, 2015, the Buccaneers ruled Smith out for Week 10's matchup against the Dallas Cowboys. On November 22, 2015, Smith was cleared to play in Week 11's matchup against the Philadelphia Eagles. On December 4, 2015, the Tampa Bay Buccaneers ruled Smith out for Week 13's matchup against the Atlanta Falcons due to a hamstring injury.

On September 12, 2016, Smith was placed on injured reserve after he sustained a right knee injury in the season-opening win against the Atlanta Falcons.

On October 5, 2017, Smith was released by the Buccaneers.

=== Detroit Lions ===
On October 18, 2017, Smith signed with the Detroit Lions. He was released on October 28, 2017, but was re-signed two days later. He was waived on November 14, 2017.

=== Arizona Cardinals ===
On July 26, 2018, the Arizona Cardinals signed Smith to a one-year contract. He was released by the Cardinals on September 24, 2018.

=== Oakland Raiders ===
On November 5, 2018, Smith was signed by the Oakland Raiders. He played in three games before being placed on injured reserve on November 26, 2018, with an Achilles injury.

=== Seattle Dragons ===
Smith was selected by the Seattle Dragons in the 2020 XFL draft. He had his contract terminated when the league suspended operations on April 10, 2020.

=== Regular season ===
Year	Team	Games		Tackles				Interceptions						Fumbles		
Year	Team	GP	GS	Cmb	Solo	Ast	Sck	TFL	FF	FR	Yds	TD	Int	Yds	TD	PD
2014	TAM	15	7	17	13	4	6.5	4	1	1	0	0	0	0	0	2
2015	TAM	12	11	22	15	7	7	5	3	3	0	0	0	22	1	1
2016	TAM	1	0	—	—	—	—	—	—	—	—	—	—	—	—	
2017
2017	TAM	1	0	1	1	—	—	—	—	—	—	—	—	—	—	
2017	DET	2	0	1	1	—	—	—	—	—	—	—	—	—	—	
2018	ARI	3	0	1	0	1	—	—	—	—	—	—	—	—	—	
2018	OAK	3	0	2	1	1	—	1	—	—	—	—	—	—	—	
Career		37	18	43	30	13	13.5	10	4	4	0	0	0	22	1	3

== Personal life ==
Smith's father, who had been incarcerated throughout his childhood, was released from prison in 2011. As of 2015, Smith's father was in ministry school and was preaching in Tyler, Texas.

== Coaching career ==
=== Atlanta Falcons ===
Prior to the 2024 season, Smith was hired to serve as the outside linebackers coach for the Atlanta Falcons under head coach Raheem Morris. On February 10, 2026, it was announced that Smith would not be retained by Atlanta following John Timu's promotion to the same role.

=== Texas Tech ===
On February 11, 2026, Smith was hired to serve as the outside linebackers coach for Texas Tech, replacing C. J. Ah You.
