= Ricky Wesson =

American football player (born 1955)

Rickey Wesson
No. 25
- Positions: Quarterback, Cornerback

Personal information
- Born: June 29, 1955 (age 71); Dallas, Texas, U.S.
- Listed height: 5 ft 9 in (1.75 m)
- Listed weight: 163 lb (74 kg)

Career information
- High school: South Oak Cliff
- College: SMU
- NFL draft: 1977: undrafted

Career history
- Kansas City Chiefs (1977); Winnipeg Blue Bombers (1979–1980)
- Stats at Pro Football Reference

Ricky Charles Wesson (born June 29, 1955) is a former collegiate and professional football player.

== Early life and education ==
Wesson grew up in Dallas, Texas, and graduated from South Oak Cliff High School in 1973.

After four years at SMU, Wesson played professional football and then returned to SMU to successfully complete his undergraduate degree in business administration.

== Football ==
As quarterback for SMU, Wesson led the team in total offense three consecutive years, including one year—1974–in which he led the Southwest Conference in both total offense and passing touchdowns. He was also the first SMU quarterback to lead the team in both rushing and passing.

Wesson started three games his freshman year. In doing so, he became the first Black man to start at quarterback for SMU.

Undrafted out of college, Wesson was signed to play defensive back for the NFL’s Kansas City Chiefs. After one year with the Chiefs, Wesson played two years for the Canadian Football League’s Winnipeg Blue Bombers.

== Life after football ==
After finishing his football career and getting his college degree from SMU, Wesson went to work for the US Postal Service. As of 2021, he had worked at the USPS for over 30 years.

Wesson was inducted into the Texas Black Sports Hall of Fame in 2009.
