= 2010 Texas Tech Red Raiders football team =

American college football season

2010 Texas Tech Red Raiders football

TicketCity Bowl champion

TicketCity Bowl, W 45–38 vs. Northwestern
- Conference: Big 12 Conference
- South Division
- Record: 8–5 (3–5 Big 12)
- Head coach: Tommy Tuberville (1st season)
- Offensive coordinator: Neal Brown (1st season)
- Offensive scheme: Air raid
- Defensive coordinator: James Willis (1st season)
- Base defense: 3–4
- Home stadium: Jones AT&T Stadium

Uniform

2010 Big 12 Conference football standings
	Conf.			Overall
Team	W		L	W		L
North Division
No. 20 Nebraska xy	6	–	2	10	–	4
No. 18 Missouri x	6	–	2	10	–	3
Kansas State	3	–	5	7	–	6
Iowa State	3	–	5	5	–	7
Colorado	2	–	6	5	–	7
Kansas	1	–	7	3	–	9
South Division
No. 6 Oklahoma xy$	6	–	2	12	–	2
No. 13 Oklahoma State x	6	–	2	11	–	2
No. 19 Texas A&M x	6	–	2	9	–	4
Baylor	4	–	4	7	–	6
Texas Tech	3	–	5	8	–	5
Texas	2	–	6	5	–	7
Championship: Oklahoma 23, Nebraska 20
$ – BCS representative as conference champion; x – Division champion/co-champions; y – Championship game participant; Rankings from AP Poll

The 2010 Texas Tech Red Raiders football team represented Texas Tech University as a member of the Big 12 Conference during the 2010 NCAA Division I FBS football season. Led by first-year head coach Tommy Tuberville, the Red Raiders compiled and overall record of 8–5 with a mark of 3–5 in conference play, placing fifth in the Big 12's South Division. Texas Tech was invited to the inaugural TicketCity Bowl, where they defeated Northwestern, 45–38. The team played home games at Jones AT&T Stadium in Lubbock, Texas

== Pre-season ==
=== Coaching changes ===
On December 28, 2009, head coach Mike Leach was suspended by Texas Tech University pending investigation of alleged inappropriate treatment of Adam James, a redshirt sophomore wide receiver, and the son of former SMU Mustangs and New England Patriots running back Craig James. The suspension came after allegations that Leach treated Adam James unfairly following a mild concussion. Leach was terminated by the university on December 30, 2009. Assistant Head Coach/defensive coordinator Ruffin McNeill was named interim head coach and led the team during their appearance in the 2010 Alamo Bowl.

On January 9, 2010, Tommy Tuberville was named head coach, replacing interim head coach Ruffin McNeill. Tuberville was introduced at a press conference on Sunday, January 10, 2010. Inside receivers coach Lincoln Riley, running backs coach Clay McGuire, cornerbacks coach Brian Mitchell and special team's coordinator Eric Russell were released from the coaching staff. Safeties coach Carlos Mainord retired after six seasons with the program. Offensive graduate assistant Sonny Cumbie and offensive line coach Matt Moore were the only coaches to remain with on staff after Tuberville was hired. Moore remained in the same position while Cumbie replaced Lincoln Riley as inside receiver's coach. Neal Brown was hired as offensive coordinator after four seasons with the Troy Trojans, after two seasons in the same position. James Willis, former assistant to Tuberville at Auburn, was hired as defensive coordinator. Willis previously served as associate head coach and outside linebackers coach with the Alabama Crimson Tide for the 2009 season.

=== Recruiting ===
College recruiting
Name	Hometown	School	Height	Weight	40^{‡}	Commit date
Dartwan Bush; DE	Freeport, Texas	Brazoswood	6 ft 2 in (1.88 m)	245 lb (111 kg)	4.89	Dec 22, 2009
Dartwan Bush; DE	Recruit ratings: Scout: Rivals: (77)					
Aleon Calhoun; OT	Navasota, Texas	Navasota	6 ft 7 in (2.01 m)	315 lb (143 kg)	5.30	Jan 22, 2010
Aleon Calhoun; OT	Recruit ratings: Scout: Rivals: (76)					
Joe Carmical; OLB	Monticello, Arkansas	Monticello	6 ft 2 in (1.88 m)	225 lb (102 kg)	4.67	Jan 24, 2010
Joe Carmical; OLB	Recruit ratings: Scout: Rivals: (77)					
Beau Carpenter; OT	Sulphur Springs, Texas	Sulphur Springs	6 ft 7 in (2.01 m)	270 lb (120 kg)	4.84	Jun 6, 2010
Beau Carpenter; OT	Recruit ratings: Scout: Rivals: (78)					
Lawrence Cayou; DE	New Orleans, Louisiana	McDonogh No. 35	6 ft 4 in (1.93 m)	250 lb (110 kg)	—	Feb 3, 2010
Lawrence Cayou; DE	Recruit ratings: Scout: Rivals: (40)					
Coby Coleman; DT	Frankston, Texas	Frankston	6 ft 3 in (1.91 m)	286 lb (130 kg)	4.79	Aug 2, 2010
Coby Coleman; DT	Recruit ratings: Scout: Rivals: (77)					
Shawn Corker; WR	Fort Lauderdale, Florida	Cardinal Gibbons	6 ft 1 in (1.85 m)	182 lb (83 kg)	4.6	Jul 27, 2010
Shawn Corker; WR	Recruit ratings: Scout: Rivals: (78)					
Delans Griffin; RB	Clinton, Oklahoma	Clinton	5 ft 11 in (1.80 m)	180 lb (82 kg)	4.5	Aug 7, 2010
Delans Griffin; RB	Recruit ratings: Scout: Rivals: (78)					
Cqulin Hubert; RB	Houston, Texas	Eisenhower	6 ft 2 in (1.88 m)	219 lb (99 kg)	5.2	Feb 3, 2010
Cqulin Hubert; RB	Recruit ratings: Scout: Rivals: (76)					
Don Hursey; CB	Washington, D.C.	Woodson	5 ft 10 in (1.78 m)	175 lb (79 kg)	4.5	Aug 21, 2010
Don Hursey; CB	Recruit ratings: Scout: Rivals: (74)					
Urell Johnson; CB	New Orleans, Louisiana	O. Perry Walker	6 ft 0 in (1.83 m)	180 lb (82 kg)	4.59	Aug 12, 2010
Urell Johnson; CB	Recruit ratings: Scout: Rivals: (76)					
Mike Jones; DT	Sugar Land, Texas	Kempner	6 ft 3 in (1.91 m)	258 lb (117 kg)	4.9	Jan 31, 2010
Mike Jones; DT	Recruit ratings: Scout: Rivals: (40)					
Donald Langley; DT	Wesson, Mississippi	Copiah-Lincoln	6 ft 2 in (1.88 m)	289 lb (131 kg)	—	Dec 12, 2010
Donald Langley; DT	Recruit ratings: Scout: Rivals:					
Desmond Martin; S	Round Rock, Texas	Stony Point	6 ft 1 in (1.85 m)	177 lb (80 kg)	4.5	Dec 12, 2010
Desmond Martin; S	Recruit ratings: Scout: Rivals: (78)					
Benjamin McRoy; CB	Lakeland, Florida	Lakeland Senior	5 ft 9 in (1.75 m)	160 lb (73 kg)	4.4	Dec 12, 2010
Benjamin McRoy; CB	Recruit ratings: Scout: Rivals: (76)					
Darrin Moore; WR	Brenham, Texas	Blinn College	6 ft 4 in (1.93 m)	220 lb (100 kg)	4.5	Aug 13, 2010
Darrin Moore; WR	Recruit ratings: No ratings found					
Tahrick Peak; OLB	Dublin, Virginia	Pulaski County	6 ft 3 in (1.91 m)	210 lb (95 kg)	4.48	Jul 3, 2010
Tahrick Peak; OLB	Recruit ratings: Scout: Rivals: (78)					
James Polk; OT	Houston, Texas	Alief Elsik	6 ft 7 in (2.01 m)	290 lb (130 kg)	5.6	Feb 1, 2010
James Polk; OT	Recruit ratings: Scout: Rivals: (71)					
Russell Polk; S	Dallas, Texas	Carter	5 ft 11 in (1.80 m)	200 lb (91 kg)	4.5	May 15, 2010
Russell Polk; S	Recruit ratings: Scout: Rivals: (73)					
Tre'Vante Porter; CB	Oklahoma City, Oklahoma	Carl Albert	6 ft 0 in (1.83 m)	180 lb (82 kg)	4.4	Feb 1, 2010
Tre'Vante Porter; CB	Recruit ratings: Scout: Rivals: (77)					
Jackson Richards; DE	Southlake, Texas	Carroll	6 ft 4 in (1.93 m)	245 lb (111 kg)	4.8	Feb 13, 2010
Jackson Richards; DE	Recruit ratings: Scout: Rivals: (79)					
Lawrence Rumph; DE	Corsicana, Texas	Navarro College	6 ft 4 in (1.93 m)	275 lb (125 kg)	4.8	Feb 14, 2010
Lawrence Rumph; DE	Recruit ratings: Scout: Rivals:					
Brandon Smith; CB	Raceland, Louisiana	Central Lafourche	6 ft 1 in (1.85 m)	175 lb (79 kg)	4.4	May 18, 2010
Brandon Smith; CB	Recruit ratings: Scout: Rivals: (76)					
Scott Smith; DE	El Dorado, Kansas	Butler Community College	6 ft 5 in (1.96 m)	255 lb (116 kg)	—	Dec 18, 2009
Scott Smith; DE	Recruit ratings: Scout: Rivals:					
Philip Warren; CB	Miami, Florida	Miami Southridge	5 ft 9 in (1.75 m)	178 lb (81 kg)	4.4	Feb 1, 2010
Philip Warren; CB	Recruit ratings: Scout: Rivals: (40)					
LaVaughn Whigham; S	Miami, Florida	Miami Southridge	6 ft 1 in (1.85 m)	185 lb (84 kg)	4.5	Feb 1, 2010
LaVaughn Whigham; S	Recruit ratings: Scout: Rivals:					
Zachary Winbush; OLB	Schertz, Texas	Samuel Clemens	6 ft 2 in (1.88 m)	205 lb (93 kg)	4.6	Mar 10, 2010
Zachary Winbush; OLB	Recruit ratings: Scout: Rivals: (77)					
Scotty Young; QB	Denton, Texas	Ryan	6 ft 3 in (1.91 m)	188 lb (85 kg)	4.8	Mar 8, 2010
Scotty Young; QB	Recruit ratings: Scout: Rivals: (75)					
Overall recruit ranking: Scout: 36 Rivals: 41
‡ Refers to 40-yard dash; Note: In many cases, Scout, Rivals, 247Sports, On3, and ESPN may conflict in their listings of height, weight and 40 time.; In these cases, the average was taken. ESPN grades are on a 100-point scale.; Sources: "Texas Tech Football Commitment List (28)". Rivals.; "Texas Tech College Football Recruiting Commits". Scout.; "Texas Tech Red Raiders". ESPN.; "Scout.com Team Recruiting Rankings". Scout.; "2010 Team Ranking". Rivals.com.

=== Award watch lists ===
- Baron Batch – Doak Walker Award
- Brian Duncan – Butkus Award, Lott Trophy, Bronko Nagurski Trophy
- Detron Lewis – Biletnikoff Award
- Taylor Potts – Davey O'Brien Award

== Personnel ==
=== Coaching staff ===
Name	Position	Years at Texas Tech	Alma mater
Tommy Tuberville	Head coach	1	Southern Arkansas University
Neal Brown	Offensive coordinator	1	University of Massachusetts Amherst
James Willis	Defensive coordinator	1	Auburn University
Sonny Cumbie	Inside Receivers	1	Texas Tech University
Tommy Mainord	Outside Receivers	1	Tarleton State University
Sam McElroy	Defensive line	1	Southwest Texas State University
Matt Moore	Offensive line	4	Valdosta State University
Robert Prunty	Defensive ends and Outside Linebackers	1	Alabama A&M University
Travaris Robinson	Secondary	1	Auburn University
Chad Scott	Running backs	1	University of North Carolina at Chapel Hill
Joe Walker	Head strength and conditioning coach	1	Auburn University

=== Roster ===
Center: 73 Justin Keown – Junior; Cornerback: 5 Tre’ Porter – Freshman; 31 Eugene Neboh – Sophomore; Deep Snapper: 52 Alex Chester – Freshman; 60 Jesse Smitherman – Junior; Defensive back: 2 Urell Johnson – Freshman; 7 Will Ford – Sophomore; 12 D.J. Johnson – Sophomore; 17 Terrence Griffin – Junior; 19 Giorgio Durham – Junior; 21 Jarvis Phillips – (redshirt) Freshman; 22 Jared Flannel – Junior; 24 Corey Lee – Sophomore; 25 Darius Pipkins – Freshman; 28 LaRon Moore – Senior; 33 Don Hursey – Freshman; 34 Sawyer Vest – Junior; 35 Arlan Waller – Sophomore; 36 Nubian Peak – (redshirt) Freshman; Defensive end: 40 Aundrey Barr – (redshirt) Freshman; 46 Christopher Knighton – (redshirt) Freshman; 50 Jackson Richards – Freshman; 54 Dartwan Bush – Freshman; 57 Brian Duncan – Senior; 87 Travis Malone – Sophomore; 91 Kerry Hyder – (redshirt) Freshman; 94 Scott Smith – Junior; Defensive lineman: 37 Demetric Lee – Sophomore; 79 Femi Awe – Freshman; 83 Omar Ontiveros – Freshman; 90 David Neill – Junior; 93 Colby Whitlock – Senior; 99 Chris Perry – Junior; Defensive tackle: 47 Myles Wade – Junior; 61 Bobbie Agoucha – Junior; 76 Cody Rogers – Freshman; 77 Coby Coleman – Freshman; 92 Lawrence Rumph – Junior; 95 Pearlie Graves – (redshirt) Freshman; 97 Britton Barbee – Senior; 98 Donald Langley – Junior	Inside receiver: 2 Cornelius Douglas – Sophomore; 6 Austin Zouzalik – Sophomore; 11 Tramain Swindall – Junior; 17 Detron Lewis – Senior; 82 Adam James – Junior; 83 Blake Kelley – Senior; Kicker: 49 Donnie Carona – Junior; Linebacker: 13 Julius Howard – Senior; 18 Tanner Foster – Sophomore; 20 Bront Bird – Senior; 23 Dion Chidozie – (redshirt) Freshman; 27 Zach Winbush – Freshman; 29 Michael Aguilar – Senior; 41 Sam Fehoko – Junior; 42 Daniel Cobb – (redshirt) Freshman; 45 Tyrone Sonier – Junior; 51 Cqulin Hubert – Freshman; 53 Joe Carmical – Freshman; 56 Jonathan Brydon – Senior; 58 Tahrick Peak – Freshman; Offensive lineman: 59 Joel Gray – (redshirt) Freshman; 61 Jonathan Guerra – Junior; 64 Alex Dubois – Freshman; 65 LaAdrian Waddle – Sophomore; 66 Deveric Gallington – Sophomore; 68 Terry McDaniel – Sophomore; 69 Matt Scott – Freshman; 70 Chris Olson – Senior; 71 Kyle Clark – (redshirt) Freshman; 72 Beau Carpenter – Freshman; 74 Mickey Okafor – Junior; 75 Blake Emert – Junior; 78 Lonnie Edwards – Junior; Offensive tackle: 63 James Polk – Freshman; Placekicker: 40 Jeremy Elder – Freshman; 45 Kramer Fyfe – Freshman; 84 Bradley Hicks – Junior; 85 Matt Williams – Senior; Punter: 9 Jonathan LaCour – Junior; 43 Ryan Erxleben – Sophomore	Quarterback: 1 Steven Sheffield – Senior; 3 Jacob Karam – (redshirt) Freshman; 7 Seth Doege – Sophomore; 12 Taylor Potts – Senior; 15 Scotty Young – Freshman; 16 Brant Costilla – Freshman; Running back: 10 Harrison Jeffers – Sophomore; 20 Josh Talbott – Freshman; 24 Eric Stephens – Sophomore; 25 Baron Batch – Senior; 31 Tim Graves – Freshman; 32 Aaron Crawford – Junior; 36 Gerardo Acevedo – Senior; 37 Andre McCorkle – Senior; Safety: 1 Terrance Bullitt – (redshirt) Freshman; 14 Desmond Martin – Freshman; 16 Cody Davis – Sophomore; 26 Franklin Mitchem – Senior; 29 Russell Polk – Freshman; 30 Brett Dewhurst – Junior; 32 Blake Gower – Freshman; 38 Jordan Osborne – Sophomore; 39 Matt Bonano – Junior; Tight end: 33 Bo Whitney – Freshman; 48 Ryan Haliburton – Sophomore; 89 Tony Trahan – Sophomore; Wide receiver: 4 Derrick Mays – (redshirt) Freshman; 8 Jacoby Franks – Junior; 13 Ernest "E.J." Celestie – Freshman; 14 Darrin Moore – Sophomore; 18 Eric Ward – (redshirt) Freshman; 19 Lyle Leong – Senior; 22 Ty Taylor – Freshman; 23 Brett Hume – Freshman; 26 Nick Cheesman – Freshman; 27 Kevin Thornton – Freshman; 28 Brent Mitcham – Freshman; 80 Trey Ozee – Freshman; 86 Alex Torres – Sophomore; 87 Aaron Fisher – (redshirt) Freshman; 88 Shawn Corker – Freshman; 88 Desmond Haynes – Sophomore
Source: 2010 Texas Tech Football Roster Archived 2012-09-16 at the Wayback Machine: (redshirt) indicates that the player redshirted, sitting out a year

== Schedule ==
Date	Time	Opponent	Site	TV	Result	Attendance	Source
September 5	2:30 pm	SMU*	Jones AT&T Stadium; Lubbock, TX	ESPN	W 35–27	57,528 (Note: The 2010 SMU vs. Texas Tech game was the second largest crowd to watch a football game at Jones AT&T Stadium, and the largest ever for a season opener.)	
September 11	7:00 pm	at New Mexico*	University Stadium; Albuquerque, NM	The Mtn.	W 52–17	25,734	
September 18	7:00 pm	No. 6 Texas	Jones AT&T Stadium; Lubbock, TX (rivalry)	ABC/ESPN2	L 14–24	60,454 (Note: Denotes the largest crowd to watch a football game at Jones AT&T Stadium (beating a previous record set during the 2009 Texas Tech Red Raiders season).)	
October 2	6:00 pm	at Iowa State	Jack Trice Stadium; Ames, IA	FCS Central	L 38–52	43,162	
October 9	11:00 am	vs. Baylor	Cotton Bowl; Dallas, TX (rivalry)	FSN	W 45–38	48,213	
October 16	2:30 pm	No. 20 Oklahoma State	Jones AT&T Stadium; Lubbock, TX	FSN	L 17–34	60,454	
October 23	2:30 pm	at Colorado	Folsom Field; Boulder, CO		W 27–24	47,655	
October 30	2:30 pm	at Texas A&M	Kyle Field; College Station, TX (rivalry)		L 27–45	84,479	
November 6	7:00 pm	No. 14 Missouri^{†}	Jones AT&T Stadium; Lubbock, TX	ABC	W 24–17	55,667	
November 13	2:30 pm	at No. 19 Oklahoma	Gaylord Family Oklahoma Memorial Stadium; Norman, OK	ABC	L 7–45	85,116	
November 20	2:00 pm	Weber State*	Jones AT&T Stadium; Lubbock, TX		W 64–21	55,083	
November 27	6:00 pm	Houston*	Jones AT&T Stadium; Lubbock, TX (rivalry)	FSN	W 35–20	53,461	
January 1	11:00 am	vs. Northwestern*	Cotton Bowl; Dallas, TX (TicketCity Bowl)	ESPNU	W 45–38	40,121	
*Non-conference game; ^{†}Homecoming; Rankings from AP Poll released prior to the game; All times are in Central time

== Game summaries ==
=== SMU ===
	1	2	3	4	Total
SMU	0	7	10	10	27
Texas Tech	7	14	14	0	35

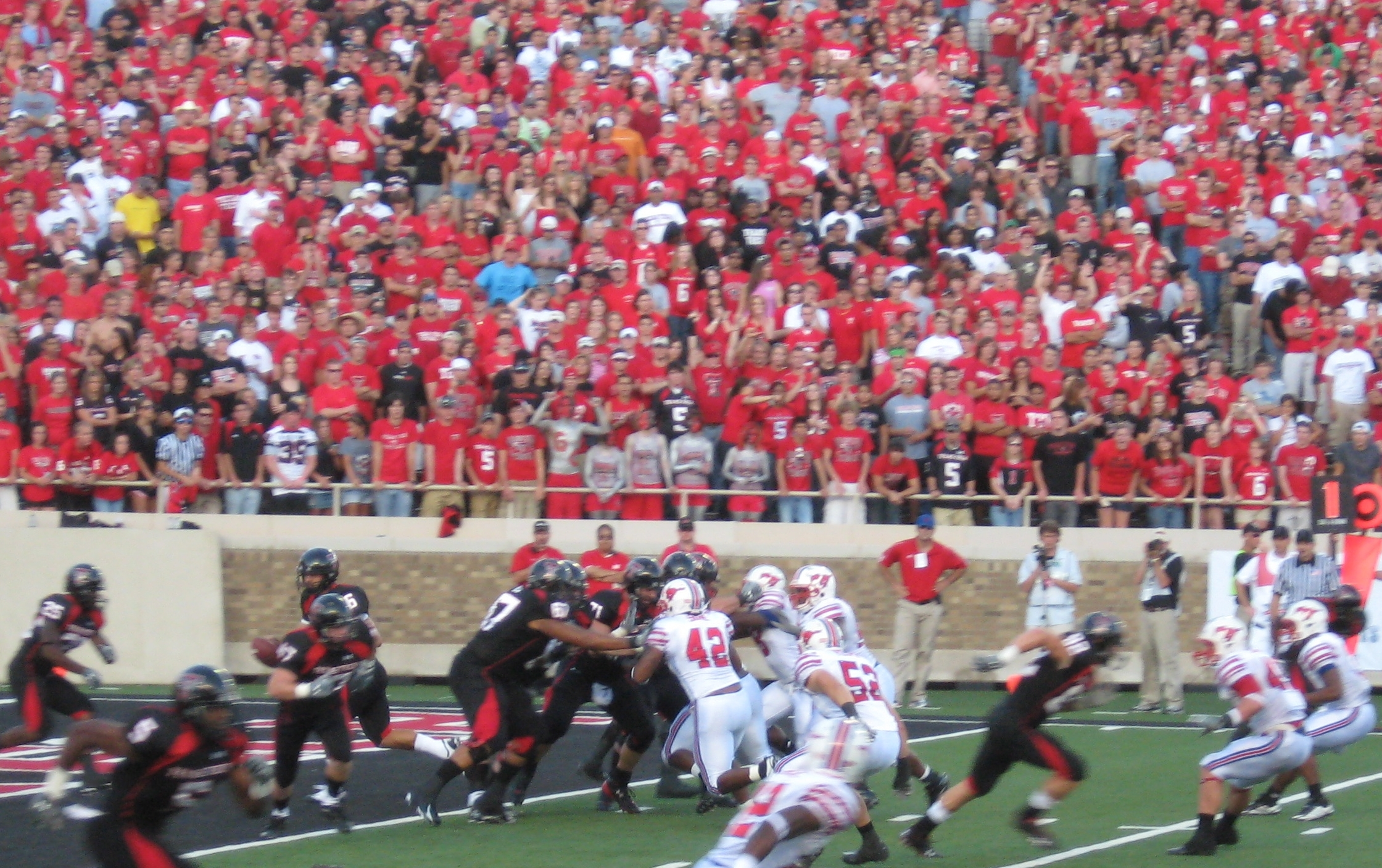
Tech on offense against SMU during the 2008 meeting

This game marked the 48th meeting of the Texas Tech Red Raiders and the SMU Mustangs. This was their first match-up since September 13, 2008, when Texas Tech defeated SMU with a final score of 43–7 at Jones AT&T Stadium. Going into the game, the Red Raiders led the all-time series against the Mustangs with a record of 31–16.

The SMU Mustangs won the coin toss and elected to receive the opening kick off. Donnie Carona kicked the opening kickoff, a 70-yard touchback, for the Red Raiders. The Mustangs opening drive proved to be unfruitful and ended in a punt. The Red Raiders opening drive was equally as unproductive ending with a field goal by Matt Williams being blocked. Texas Tech's first score of the game came in their third drive after the Red Raiders recovered a fumbled punt. Following four rushing plays, Taylor Potts completed a touchdown pass to Lyle Leong for 2 yards. Matt Williams successfully converted the PAT, bringing the score to 7–0. Neither team would score any more points in the first quarter.

The Red Raiders would be the first to score in the second quarter with a 6-yard Taylor Potts pass to Detron Lewis for a touchdown. Matt Williams kicked the extra point and brought the score to 14–0. The Mustangs would be the next to score, five drives later, by way of a 2-yard rush by Zach Line for a touchdown, their first of the game. Matt Szymanski followed up with a successful extra point kick for a score of 14–7. The Red Raiders answered the Mustangs score with a touchdown of their own on the next drive when Taylor Potts once again found Detron Lewis in the end zone for a 16-yard touchdown pass. Matt Williams extra point attempt was good ending the last drive of the half. Texas Tech led at the half with a score of 21–7.

Following halftime, the Red Raiders received the opening kick-off of the second half. Their opening drive of the half consisted of six plays and ended with a 4-yard touchdown pass by Taylor Potts to Lyle Leong. Matt Williams' extra point attempt was good bring the score to 28–7. The Mustangs would be the next to score on the very next drive with a 17-yard pass by Kyle Padron to Cole Beasley and an PAT by Matt Szymanski for a score of 28–14. After a D.J. Johnson interception on the Mustangs next drive, the Red Raiders would march down the field on their third drive of the half for another touchdown. This touchdown was courtesy of a 3-yard rush by Eric Stephens, with an extra point by Matt Williams for a score of 35–14. The final scoring drive of the third quarter would end with a 24-yard Mustangs field goal by Matt Szymanski. The final score at the end of the third quarter was 35–17.

The Mustangs would be the only team to score in the fourth quarter. Their first score came on their first drive with a SMU school record 61-yard field goal by Matt Szymanski. Their next score, and the last of the game, would come two drives later with a 13-yard touchdown pass by Kyle Padron to Cole Beasley and an extra point by Matt Szymanski. The final score at the end of the game was 35–27.

The Red Raiders rushed for a total of 72 yards and passed for 359 yards in 34 completed passes. The Red Raiders only had 1 turnover by way of a fumble during a failed 4th down quarterback dive in the 4th quarter. The Mustangs rushed for a total of 109 yards and passed for 218 yards in 21 completed passes. In contrast to the Red Raiders, the Mustangs had 4 turnovers, 3 of which were interceptions.

=== New Mexico ===
	1	2	3	4	Total
Texas Tech	21	10	7	14	52
New Mexico	3	14	0	0	17

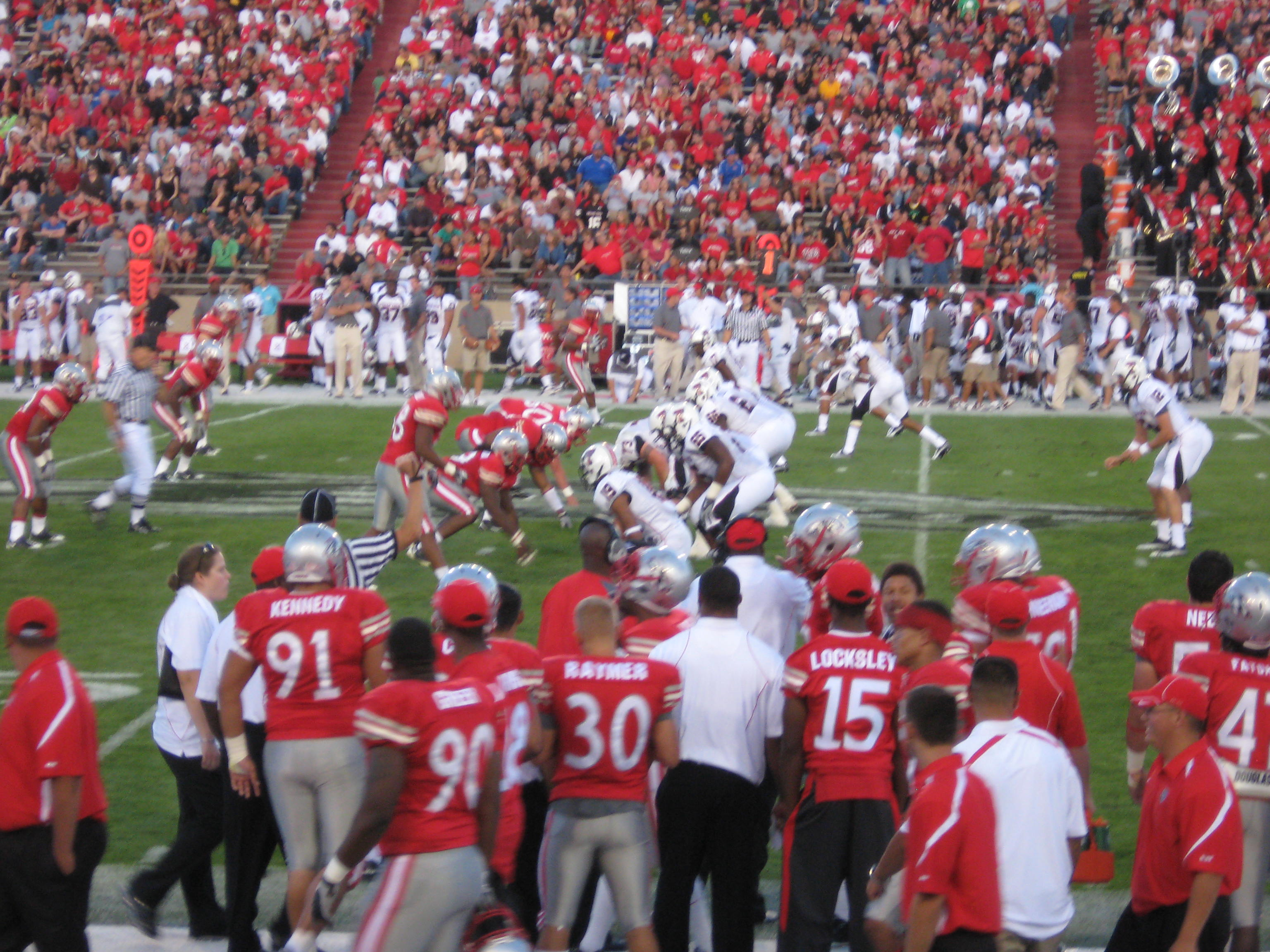
Tech on offense during the New Mexico game

The Red Raiders first 2010 road game was against the New Mexico Lobos in Albuquerque. This game was the 42nd meeting of the two teams, with Texas Tech leading the series with an all-time record of 33–6–2 going in. Texas Tech defeated New Mexico in the 2009 season with a final score of 48–28.

Texas Tech won the coin toss and elected to receive the kickoff. The Red Raiders first drive ended in 4 plays with a 55-yard touchdown pass by Taylor Potts to Austin Zouzalik. Matt Williams kicked the extra point kick to bring the score to 7–0 with 14:15 left in the first quarter. New Mexico's first drive lasted 9 plays and ended in blocked punt by which gave the Red Raiders the ball on the Lobos 3 yard line. The Red Raiders capitalized on the blocked punt on the next play with a 3-yard rushing touchdown by Eric Stephens and a successful extra point by Matt Williams for a score of 14–0. New Mexico's next possession ended with successful 28-yard field goal, for a score of 14–3. New Mexico's kickoff was returned 93 yards to the New Mexico 7-yard line by Eric Stephens. The Red Raiders scored two plays later with a Barron Batch rushing touchdown for 2 yards. The Matt Williams extra point brought the score to 21–3. Neither team would score on their remaining drives in the first quarter.

The Red Raiders first drive of the 2nd quarter ended in a Barron Batch fumble in the Lobos' end zone. New Mexico recovered the fumble and returned it to their 7-yard line. The Lobos would be unable to capitalize on the turnover and punted the ball away 5 plays later. The next drive ended with a Red Raider field goal by Matt Williams for a score of 24–3. The Lobos first touchdown of the game came on the next drive with a B.R. Holbrook touchdown pass to Lucas Reed. James Aho kicked the extra point for the Lobos and brought the score to 24–10. The Red Raiders answered the Lobos' touchdown with one of their own on their next possession. This touchdown came way by a 25-yard Taylor Potts pass to Lyle Leong with a Matt Williams extra point for a score of 31–10. The Lobos scored the final score of the half after Chris Hernandez recovered his own team's fumble for a touchdown. James Aho kicked the extra point and brought the final score at the half to 31–17.

The Lobos received the opening kick of the 2nd half. The Lobos first drive of the third quarter ended with a blocked punt by Jonathan Brydon of the Red Raiders, placing the ball on New Mexico's 1 yard for Texas Tech's first drive. The Red Raiders were able to capitalize on the turnover with a Baron Batch touchdown rush for 1 yard. Matt Williams successfully point after attempt would be the last score by either team in the 3rd quarter. The final score at the end of the 3rd quarter was 38–17.

The Red Raiders would be the only team to score in the 4th quarter. Their first score would come during their first possession of the quarter when Tyler Potts completed at 11-yard touchdown pass to Lyle Leong. Matt Williams kicked the extra point to bring the score to 45–17. The final score by either team came after a B.R. Holbrook pass was intercepted by Jarvis Phillips of the Red Raiders on the New Mexico 40-yard line. Phillips returned the ball 27 yards to the New Mexico 13-yard line setting the Red Raiders up for a 10-yard rushing touchdown by Steven Sheffield two plays later. Matt Williams extra point was the last score of the game, bringing the final score to 52–17.

The Red Raiders passed for a total of 310 yards, with Potts completing 24 of his 41 passes and Sheffield 2 of his 7 passes. Texas Tech led in rushing for a total of 152 yards. The Lobos passed for a total of 336 yards and rushed for 97 yards. New Mexico had a total of 3 turnovers, 2 interceptions and a fumble, and 2 blocked punts, in contrast to Texas Tech's 2 fumbles.

=== Texas ===
	1	2	3	4	Total
#6 Texas	14	0	3	7	24
Texas Tech	7	7	0	0	14

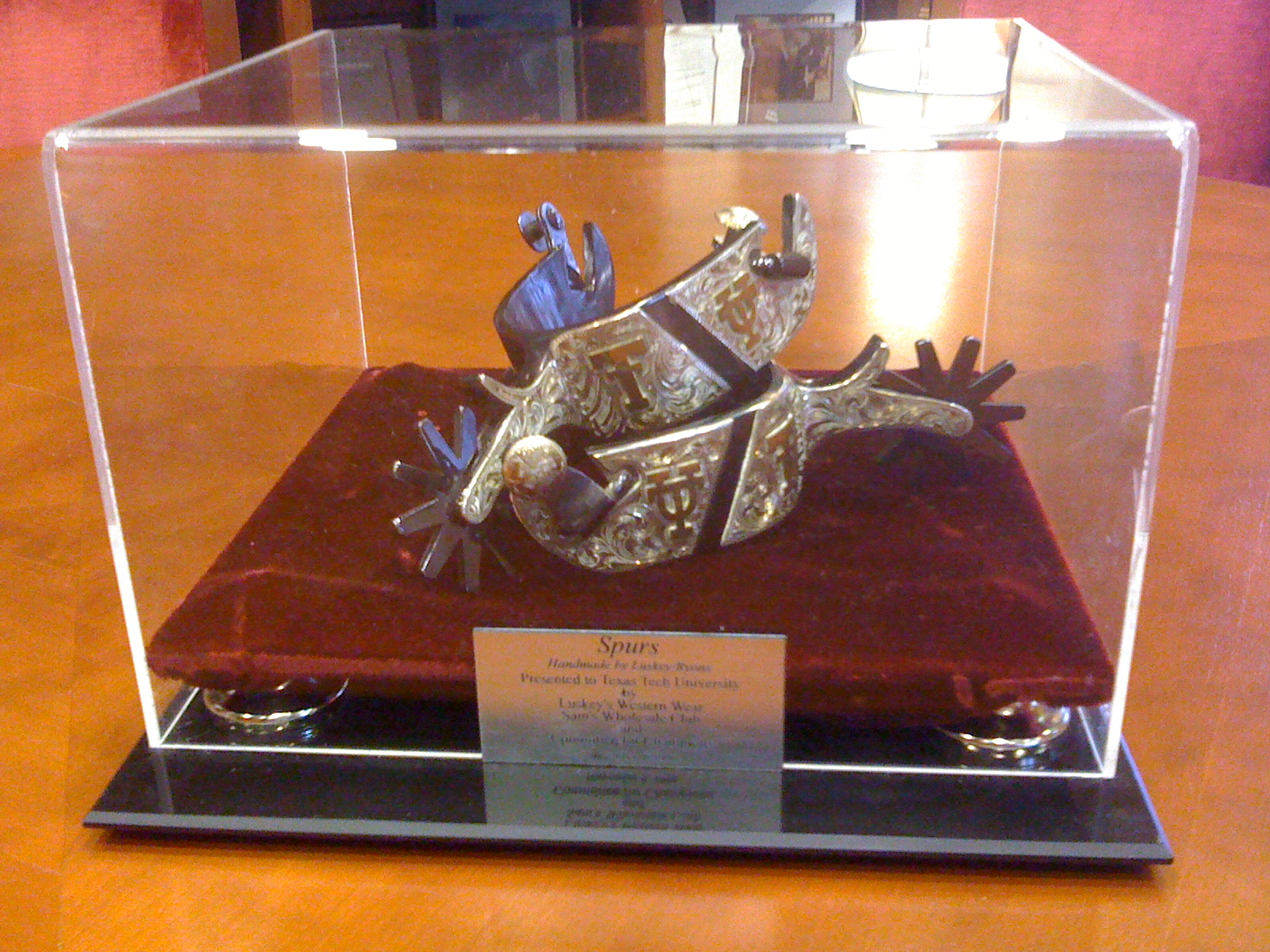
The Chancellor's Spurs is the traveling trophy between the Red Raiders and Texas Longhorns

For the first time since the Texas Tech upset over Texas in the 2008 season the Longhorns returned to Jones AT&T Stadium for an evening game. This game marked the 60th meeting of the two teams, and the Longhorns led the overall series with a record of 44–15 going into the game. At their last meeting in 2009, the Longhorns defeated the Red Raiders with a final score of 34-24. This game also marked the first sell out at the Jones AT&T Stadium since the recent expansion was completed, and a new attendance record of 60,454 was set.

Tech got off to a rocky start, with the first snap of the game going over the head of quarterback Taylor Potts. The ball was recovered by the Longhorns' Jackson Jeffcoat at Tech's 7-yard-line, and the Horns quickly scored for an early 7-0 lead. The Texas lead grew to 14-0 and the Longhorns were threatening again when Tech's Jarvis Phillips intercepted a Garrett Gilbert pass and returning it 87 yards for a touchdown. Tech tied up the game at 14-14 before halftime as Potts connected with his former high school teammate, Lyle Leong, on a fade route in the corner of the end zone for a 15-yard touchdown. The score was 17-14 in the third quarter when the Longhorns began a 22-play, 9-minute drive for a touchdown. The touchdown drive was aided by a controversial 15-yard taunting penalty against Tech's Will Ford after an incomplete Longhorn pass on 3rd down and 13 at Tech's 27-yard line. Tech's offense was held to 144 total yards in the loss. Potts threw for only 158 yards, and the Longhorns held Tech to minus-14 yards rushing.

=== Iowa State ===
	1	2	3	4	Total
Texas Tech	0	14	10	14	38
Iowa State	0	24	0	28	52

The Texas Tech Red Raiders faced the Iowa State Cyclones at the Jack Trice Stadium in Ames, Iowa for their second road game of the season. This game marked only the ninth time the two teams have met and the start of an annual conference series. The Red Raiders dominated the overall series heading into this matchup with a record of 7–1. However, the Red Raiders fell 52–38 to Iowa State marking their first loss to the Cyclones since 2002. Turnovers played a big role in this meeting as Texas Tech had three (two fumbles, one interception) while the Cyclones had none. A poor first half also contributed to the Red Raider loss.

=== Baylor ===
	1	2	3	4	Total
Baylor	14	14	3	7	38
Texas Tech	14	21	10	0	45

The Red Raiders and Bears faced off in the Cotton Bowl in Dallas, with the Red Raiders hoping to bounce back from their road loss at Iowa State. Tech was considered the "home" team in the second neutral-site game between the two teams; the 2009 Tech-Baylor game had been played at Cowboys Stadium in Arlington. The Bears got on the board first, taking the opening kickoff and marching 82 yards before scoring on Robert Griffin's 1-yard run. Tech responded with a 9-play, 80-yard drive, knotting the score at 7-7 on a 10-yard run by Eric Stephens.

Then came a special team's disaster for Tech as the Red Raiders attempted an on-side kick. However, the ball failed to travel 10 yards, and Baylor's Terrance Ganaway scooped up the ball and ran past the Tech kickoff team for an easy 38-yard touchdown and a 14-7 lead. Tech came back again, however, with a touchdown pass from Taylor Potts to Alexander Torres to tie the score again. Baylor took the lead again early in the second quarter on a Griffin TD pass to Josh Gordon, who had been arrested for marijuana possession earlier in the week after being found asleep in the drive-through lane at a Taco Bell in Waco.

Trailing 21-14, the Red Raiders responded with three straight touchdowns to take a 35-21 lead. Tech scored on a 37-yard run by Baron Batch, another short touchdown pass from Potts to Torres, and a 10-yard pass from Potts to Detron Lewis with 1:38 remaining in the half. Griffin and Baylor then burned Tech's defense, with Griffin hooking up with Kendall Wright on a 62-yard touchdown pass to narrow Tech's lead to 35-28 going into halftime.

In the third quarter, Tech scored on a Williams field goal to go up 38-28, and the Red Raiders extended their lead to 45-28 with a touchdown pass from Potts to Batch midway through the third quarter. The Bears added 10 points and kept Tech from scoring again, but the Red Raiders held on for the win. The Red Raiders had one of their best offensive showings of the year, with Potts throwing for 462 yards and the Red Raiders adding 169 rushing yards as they avoided their first-ever 0-3 start in Big 12 play.

=== Oklahoma State ===
	1	2	3	4	Total
#18 Oklahoma State	21	3	7	3	34
Texas Tech	0	14	3	0	17

=== Colorado ===
	1	2	3	4	Total
Texas Tech	0	7	7	13	27
Colorado	7	3	14	0	24

Down 17-7 in the third quarter, Texas Tech outscored Colorado 20-7 in the final 23:43 to win in Boulder, capped by a Matt Williams 36-yard field goal with 2:08 left. This was Texas Tech's first ever victory in Boulder, Colorado, and it occurred in the final season of Big 12 Conference play for the Buffaloes, as they will compete in the Pac-12 Conference in the 2011 football season.

=== Texas A&M ===
	1	2	3	4	Total
Texas Tech	7	7	0	13	27
Texas A&M	3	21	14	7	45

=== Missouri ===
	1	2	3	4	Total
#14 Missouri	14	3	0	0	17
Texas Tech	3	7	14	0	24

Tech picked up its most impressive regular season win of 2010 with its win over the Tigers, ranked #14 in the AP poll and #12 in the BCS rankings. Tech fell behind early, trailing 14-0 after the Tigers scored on two of their first three possessions. Senior quarterback Steven Sheffield started the game in place of Taylor Potts, and Sheffield led Tech to a first-quarter field goal to make the score 14-3. Late in the second quarter, Potts came in at quarterback and quickly led Tech to a touchdown, an 8-yard pass to Detron Lewis.

Potts played the entire second half at QB for Tech, adding a pair of touchdown passes to Lyle Leong as the Tech offense got untracked. Tech moved into scoring position with a chance to extend the lead, but a Taylor Potts interception gave the Tigers a chance to tie the game. The Tech defense shut out Missouri's offense in the second half, holding Blaine Gabbert to just 12 of 30 passing and 95 passing yards for the entire game. Tech's defensive backs knocked down two potential game-tying touchdown passes in the fourth quarter to preserve the win, which improved Tech's season record to 5-4.

=== Oklahoma ===
	1	2	3	4	Total
Texas Tech	7	0	0	0	7
Oklahoma	24	14	7	0	45

=== Weber State ===
	1	2	3	4	Total
Weber State	0	0	7	14	21
Texas Tech	23	21	6	14	64

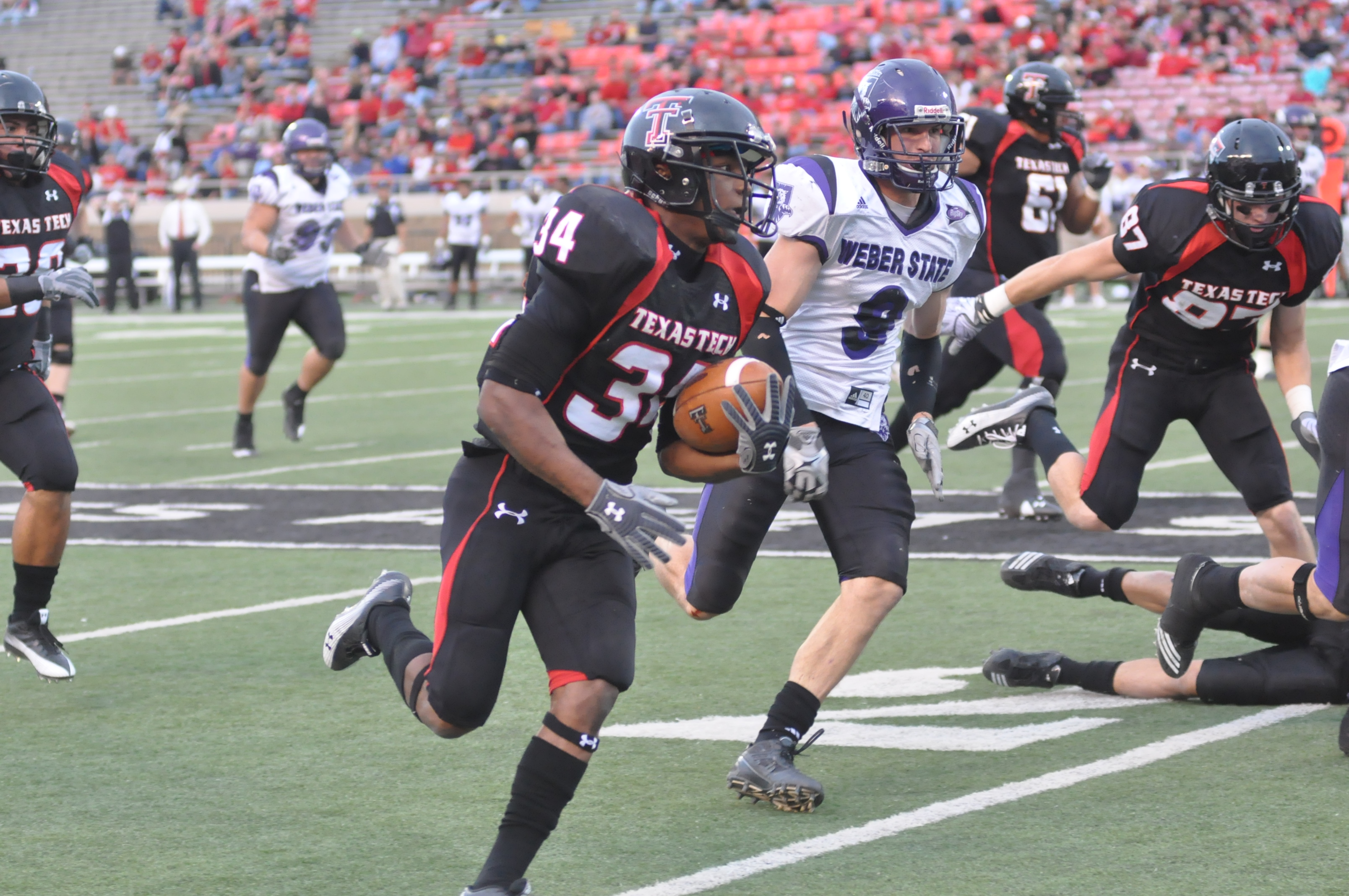
Freshman Ben McRoy scores a second-half touchdown for Texas Tech during the Red Raiders' win over Weber State.

Tech clinched their 11th straight bowl berth with an easy non-conference win over FCS opponent Weber State. The Red Raiders opened the game with touchdowns on their first three possessions. Taylor Potts scored on a 2-yard run and threw scoring passes to Baron Batch and Lyle Leong as Tech quickly went up 21-0. Tech's defense forced a safety late in the first quarter to give Tech a 23-0 lead.

Potts threw for 272 yards before ending his day late in the 2nd quarter. Steven Sheffield came in to throw a TD pass to Aaron Crawford as Tech's second-team offense came in a few minutes before halftime.

Tech's reserves played the entire second half, with Ben McRoy scoring on two touchdown runs and Matt Williams and Donnie Carona adding a field goal each as the rout continued. Sheffield completed 8 of 12 passes for 109 yards in one quarter of play, and Seth Doege completed 3 of 4 passes for 58 yards on two touchdown drives.

=== Houston ===
The Red Raiders came into their final regular season, on Thanksgiving weekend at Jones AT&T Stadium, seeking revenge for their 2009 road loss to the Houston Cougars. Tech's victory improved the Red Raiders' record to 7-5 and denied the Cougars bowl eligibility, as the Cougars finished with a 5-7 record.

Tech took the lead early on a Taylor Potts touchdown pass to Detron Lewis, but the Cougars came back to take a 10-7 lead. Tech went up 14-10 on a 26-yard run by Eric Stephens, and the Red Raiders added to their lead with another Potts-to-Lewis touchdown throw. Potts threw second-half touchdown passes to Lyle Leong and Baron Batch as Tech pulled away for the win. The Cougars actually outgained Tech in total yardage and first downs, but Tech's defense forced three interceptions on the Cougar's freshman quarterback, David Piland, playing for the injured Case Keenum. Houston ended up with 585 total yards to Tech's 488.

	1	2	3	4	Total
Houston	10	3	0	7	20
Texas Tech	14	7	7	7	35

=== Northwestern–TicketCity Bowl ===
	1	2	3	4	Total
Northwestern	0	6	18	14	38
Texas Tech	10	14	14	7	45

== Awards and honors ==
- Taylor Potts – AT&T ESPN All-America Player of the Week
- Eric Stevens – Big 12 Conference Player of the Week
