= Danny Colbert =

American football player (born 1950)

No. 46
- Position: Defensive back

Personal information
- Born: December 15, 1950 (age 75); Corsicana, Texas, U.S.
- Listed height: 5 ft 11 in (1.80 m)
- Listed weight: 175 lb (79 kg)

Career information
- High school: South Oak Cliff (Dallas, Texas)
- College: Tulsa
- NFL draft: 1974: 9th round, 210th overall pick

Career history
- San Diego Chargers (1974–1976)
- Stats at Pro Football Reference

Danny Joel Colbert (born December 15, 1950) is an American former professional football player.

== Early life ==
Colbert was born in Corsicana, Texas, grew up in Dallas, Texas and graduated from South Oak Cliff High School in 1969. In high school, he starred in the long jump as well in football at running back and defensive back.

At one 1969 national track meet in California, Colbert's long jump was 23 feet, 6.5 inches.

A 2013 article from Dallas Morning News concluded that South Oak Cliff High School (SOC) had produced the most talented defensive backs of any single high school in the prior 60 years of Dallas-area football. To demonstrate their point, they listed 5 players from recent decades: Colbert, along with Egypt Allen, Michael Downs, Alcy Jackson, and Rod Jones. In 1984, that same newspaper mentioned Colbert while creating an all-time Dallas-area high school all-star team. On that hypothetical team, drawn from players from all area high schools over the preceding 60 years, Colbert was on the honorable mention team.

== College career ==
Colbert first enrolled at Texas Christian University, where the New York Times called him a "standout" on the team

Colbert transferred to the University of Tulsa, where he played his final two years of college football.

One organization concluded that Colbert was one of Tulsa's best football players, all time, at both defensive back and punt returner.

== Professional career ==
Colbert was drafted in the ninth round of the 1974 NFL draft by the San Diego Chargers.

He played with the Chargers for 3 seasons as a defensive back as well as a punt and kick returner.
