= Jackie Allen (American football) =

American football player (born 1947)

No. 20, 21
- Position: Cornerback

Personal information
- Born: September 24, 1947 (age 79); Lawton, Oklahoma, U.S.
- Listed height: 6 ft 1 in (1.85 m)
- Listed weight: 190 lb (86 kg)

Career information
- High school: South Oak Cliff (Dallas, Texas)
- College: Baylor
- NFL draft: 1969: 6th round, 153rd overall pick

Career history
- Oakland Raiders (1969); Buffalo Bills (1970–1971); Philadelphia Eagles (1972)

Career NFL/AFL statistics
- Fumble recoveries: 1
- Stats at Pro Football Reference

Jack Franklin Allen (born September 24, 1947) is a former American collegiate and Professional Football player.

Allen grew up in Dallas, Texas. In 1965, he graduated from South Oak Cliff High School, where he played defensive back for their football team. He was then recruited to play college football at Baylor University.

In 1969, Allen was drafted 153rd overall in the sixth round to play professionally by the American Football League’s Oakland Raiders. He also played defensive back for the Buffalo Bills and Philadelphia Eagles.

Allen retired from professional football after the 1972 season.

== See also ==
- List of American Football League players
