= Andre Anderson (gridiron football, born 1955) =

American football player (born 1955)

Profile
- Position: Defensive tackle

Personal information
- Born: December 6, 1955 (age 70); Garland, Texas, U.S.
- Listed height: 6 ft 5 in (1.96 m)
- Listed weight: 259 lb (117 kg)

Career information
- High school: South Oak Cliff (Dallas, Texas)
- College: New Mexico State
- NFL draft: 1978: 9th round, 246th overall pick

Career history
- 1978: Los Angeles Rams*
- 1978: New York Jets*
- 1978: BC Lions
- * Offseason or practice squad member only

Andre Deshon Anderson (born December 6, 1955) is an American former professional football player who was a defensive lineman for the BC Lions of the Canadian Football League (CFL). In 1978, he played four regular season games for the Lions. Anderson was selected in the ninth round of the 1978 NFL draft by the Los Angeles Rams. Prior to his professional career, Anderson played college football for New Mexico State Aggies.

== Early career ==
Anderson attended high school at South Oak Cliff High School in Dallas, Texas, where he played football as an offensive tackle and was a member of the track and field team. From 1974 to 1977, he attended New Mexico State University and studied business administration. As a freshman, Anderson started for the Aggies at offensive tackle. Prior to the 1975 season, he was moved to the defense as a defensive tackle. He recovered two fumbles in a game against the Texas-Arlington Mavericks that year.

In September 1976, Anderson recovered three fumbles in a loss against the Lamar Cardinals. He was named to the United Press International (UPI) All-Valley Conference team as a junior. Prior to the 1977 season, Anderson was considered one of the best defensive lineman in his conference and was named to the All-Conference preseason team. The Aggies moved Anderson to left end and he immediately made significant contributions, accumulating three sacks in the first two games of the season. Despite missing the final two games of the season due to injury, Anderson received many accolades for his performance as a senior, including an honorable mention for the Associated Press (AP) All-America team, a spot on the All-Conference team, and an invitation to the East–West Shrine Game to play for the West team. He was the first Aggies player to be selected for the East–West game.

== Professional career ==
Anderson was selected in the ninth round of the 1978 NFL draft by the Los Angeles Rams with the 246th overall pick. In mid-August, the Rams traded Anderson to the New York Jets for a draft pick. The Jets released Anderson later that month.

After being cut by the Jets, Anderson signed with the BC Lions of the Canadian Football League. He played in four regular season games for the Lions as a defensive tackle in 1978, recording a single fumble recovery. Prior to the start of the 1979 season, he was placed on the injured list, and he did not return to the active roster that season. Anderson's contract expired in April 1980 and he was not re-signed.
