= Marcus Lucas =

American football player (born 1992)

No. 80, 82, 85, 88
- Position: Tight end

Personal information
- Born: March 1, 1992 (age 34); Liberty, Missouri, U.S.
- Listed height: 6 ft 4 in (1.93 m)
- Listed weight: 250 lb (113 kg)

Career information
- High school: Liberty
- College: Missouri
- NFL draft: 2014: undrafted

Career history
- Carolina Panthers (2014−2015)*; Miami Dolphins (2015)*; Chicago Bears (2015–2016)*; Carolina Panthers (2016)*; Seattle Seahawks (2016–2017)*; Indianapolis Colts (2017)*; Oakland Raiders (2017)*; Detroit Lions (2018)*; Seattle Seahawks (2018)*; San Francisco 49ers (2018–2019)*; Dallas Cowboys (2019)*; St. Louis Battlehawks (2020)
- * Offseason or practice squad member only
- Stats at Pro Football Reference

Marcus Lucas (born March 1, 1992) is an American former football tight end. He was signed by the Carolina Panthers as an undrafted free agent in 2014. He played college football at Missouri.

== College career ==
Lucas played college football for the Missouri Tigers. He appeared in 49 games at Missouri from 2010 to 2013 and had 130 receptions for 1,638 yards and 11 touchdowns.

== Professional career ==
Pre-draft measurables
Height	Weight	Arm length	Hand span	40-yard dash	20-yard shuttle	Three-cone drill	Vertical jump	Broad jump	Bench press
6 ft 3 3/4 in (1.92 m)	218 lb (99 kg)	33 5/8 in (0.85 m)	9 3/8 in (0.24 m)	4.60 s	4.25 s	7.07 s	36.0 in (0.91 m)	10 ft 4 in (3.15 m)	20 reps
All values from NFL Combine

=== Carolina Panthers ===
Lucas was signed by the Carolina Panthers after going undrafted in the 2014 NFL draft on May 16, 2014. Lucas was waived by the Panthers during final cuts on August 30, 2014. He was signed to the Panthers' practice squad on September 1, 2014. On January 13, 2015, he signed a reserve/future contract with the Panthers. On September 5, 2015, he was released by the Panthers.

=== Miami Dolphins ===
On September 29, 2015, Lucas was signed to the Miami Dolphins' practice squad. On the following day, he was released by the Dolphins.

=== Chicago Bears ===
On December 15, 2015, Lucas was signed to the Chicago Bears' practice squad.

On January 4, 2016, Lucas signed a futures contract with the Bears. He was waived on May 16, 2016.

=== Carolina Panthers (second stint) ===
On May 17, 2016, Lucas signed with the Panthers. On September 3, 2016, he was waived by the Panthers as part of final roster cuts.

=== Seattle Seahawks ===
On September 5, 2016, Lucas was signed to the Seahawks' practice squad. He signed a reserve/future contract with the Seahawks on January 16, 2017.

On August 21, 2017, Lucas was waived/injured by the Seahawks and placed on injured reserve. He was released on August 27, 2017.

=== Indianapolis Colts ===
On September 26, 2017, Lucas was signed to the Indianapolis Colts' practice squad. He was released on October 10, 2017.

=== Oakland Raiders ===
On December 22, 2017, Lucas was signed to the Oakland Raiders' practice squad.

=== Detroit Lions ===
On May 14, 2018, Lucas signed with the Detroit Lions. He was released on August 31, 2018.

=== Seattle Seahawks (second stint) ===
On September 3, 2018, Lucas was signed to the Seattle Seahawks' practice squad. He was released on October 9, 2018.

=== San Francisco 49ers ===
On December 11, 2018, Lucas was signed to the San Francisco 49ers' practice squad. He signed a reserve/future contract with the 49ers on January 2, 2019. He was waived on May 7, 2019.

=== Dallas Cowboys ===
On August 7, 2019, Lucas was signed by the Dallas Cowboys. He was released on August 31, 2019.

=== St. Louis BattleHawks ===
In October 2019, Lucas was drafted by the St. Louis BattleHawks as part of the 2020 XFL draft. He had his contract terminated when the league suspended operations on April 10, 2020.
