= 2010 LSU Tigers football team =

American college football season

2010 LSU Tigers football

Cotton Bowl Classic champion

Cotton Bowl Classic, W 41–24 vs. Texas A&M
- Conference: Southeastern Conference
- Western Division

Ranking
- Coaches: No. 8
- AP: No. 8
- Record: 11–2 (6–2 SEC)
- Head coach: Les Miles (6th season)
- Offensive coordinator: Gary Crowton (4th season)
- Offensive scheme: Pro-style
- Defensive coordinator: John Chavis (2nd season)
- Base defense: 4–3
- Home stadium: Tiger Stadium (Capacity: 92,400)

2010 Southeastern Conference football standings
| | Conf. | | | Overall |
| Team | W | | L | W | | L |
|---|---|---|---|---|---|---|
Eastern Division
| No. 22 South Carolina x | 5 | – | 3 | 9 | – | 5 |
| Florida | 4 | – | 4 | 8 | – | 5 |
| Georgia | 3 | – | 5 | 6 | – | 7 |
| Tennessee | 3 | – | 5 | 6 | – | 7 |
| Kentucky | 2 | – | 6 | 6 | – | 7 |
| Vanderbilt | 1 | – | 7 | 2 | – | 10 |
Western Division
| No. 1 Auburn x$# | 8 | – | 0 | 14 | – | 0 |
| No. 12 Arkansas % | 6 | – | 2 | 10 | – | 3 |
| No. 8 LSU | 6 | – | 2 | 11 | – | 2 |
| No. 10 Alabama | 5 | – | 3 | 10 | – | 3 |
| No. 15 Mississippi State | 4 | – | 4 | 9 | – | 4 |
| Ole Miss* | 1 | – | 7 | 4 | – | 8 |
Championship: Auburn 56, South Carolina 17
# – BCS National Champion; $ – BCS representative as conference champion; % – BCS at-large representative; x – Division champion/co-champions; * Ole Miss vacated all wins due to NCAA violations.; Rankings from AP Poll

The 2010 LSU Tigers football team represented Louisiana State University in the 2010 NCAA Division I FBS football season. The Tigers were led by head coach Les Miles in his 6th season. They played their home games at Tiger Stadium and were members of the Southeastern Conference in the Western Division. They finished the season 11–2, 6–2 in SEC play and were invited to the Cotton Bowl Classic where they defeated Texas A&M 41–24.

== Personnel ==
=== Coaching staff ===
| Name | Position | Seasons at LSU | Alma mater |
|---|---|---|---|
| Les Miles | Head coach | 6 | Michigan (1975) |
| Gary Crowton | Offensive coordinator | 4 | BYU (1983) |
| Greg Studrawa | Offensive Line | 4 | Bowling Green (1987) |
| Frank Wilson | Running Backs, Recruiting Coordinator | 1 | Nicholls State (1997) |
| Ron Cooper | Defensive backs | 2 | Jacksonville State (1983) |
| Steve Ensminger | Tight Ends | 1 | LSU (1982) |
| Billy Gonzales | Wide Receivers, Passing Game Coordinator | 1 | Colorado State (1994) |
| Brick Haley | Defensive Line | 2 | Alabama A&M (1989) |
| Joe Robinson | Special teams | 3 | LSU (1985) |

== Schedule ==
| Date | Time | Opponent | Rank | Site | TV | Result | Attendance |
|---|---|---|---|---|---|---|---|
| September 4 | 7:00 p.m. | vs. No. 18 North Carolina* | No. 21 | Georgia Dome; Atlanta, GA (Chick-fil-A Kickoff Game) (College GameDay) | ABC | W 30–24 | 68,919 |
| September 11 | 6:00 p.m. | at Vanderbilt | No. 19 | Vanderbilt Stadium; Nashville, TN | ESPNU | W 27–3 | 36,940 |
| September 18 | 6:00 p.m. | Mississippi State | No. 15 | Tiger Stadium; Baton Rouge, LA (rivalry) | ESPNU | W 29–7 | 92,538 |
| September 25 | 8:00 p.m. | No. 22 West Virginia* | No. 15 | Tiger Stadium; Baton Rouge, LA | ESPN2 | W 20–14 | 92,575 |
| October 2 | 2:30 p.m. | Tennessee | No. 12 | Tiger Stadium; Baton Rouge, LA | CBS | W 16–14 | 92,932 |
| October 9 | 6:30 p.m. | at No. 14 Florida | No. 12 | Ben Hill Griffin Stadium; Gainesville, FL (rivalry) | ESPN | W 33–29 | 90,721 |
| October 16 | 6:00 p.m. | McNeese State* | No. 9 | Tiger Stadium; Baton Rouge, LA | SECRN | W 32–10 | 92,576 |
| October 23 | 2:30 p.m. | at No. 4 Auburn | No. 6 | Jordan–Hare Stadium; Auburn, AL (Tiger Bowl) | CBS | L 17–24 | 87,451 |
| November 6 | 2:30 p.m. | No. 5 Alabama | No. 12 | Tiger Stadium; Baton Rouge, LA (rivalry) | CBS | W 24–21 | 92,969 |
| November 13 | 6:00 p.m. | Louisiana–Monroe*^{†} | No. 5 | Tiger Stadium; Baton Rouge, LA | PPV | W 51–0 | 92,518 |
| November 20 | 2:30 p.m. | Ole Miss | No. 5 | Tiger Stadium; Baton Rouge, LA (Magnolia Bowl) | CBS | W 43–36 | 92,915 |
| November 27 | 2:30 p.m. | at No. 12 Arkansas | No. 6 | War Memorial Stadium; Little Rock, AR (Battle for the Golden Boot) | CBS | L 23–31 | 55,808 |
| January 7, 2011 | 7:30 p.m. | vs. No. 18 Texas A&M* | No. 11 | Cowboys Stadium; Arlington, TX (Cotton Bowl Classic, rivalry) | FOX | W 41–24 | 83,514 |
*Non-conference game; ^{†}Homecoming; Rankings from AP Poll released prior to the game; All times are in Central time

Schedule Source:

== Game summaries ==
=== North Carolina ===
| | 1 | 2 | 3 | 4 | Total |
|---|---|---|---|---|---|
| #18 Tar Heels | 0 | 10 | 0 | 14 | 24 |
| #21 Tigers | 7 | 23 | 0 | 0 | 30 |

LSU began the 2010 season against North Carolina in the Chick-fil-A Kickoff Game. North Carolina took the field missing 13 key players due to NCAA investigations over relationships with agents and possible academic violations. The Tigers scored first on a 6-yard touchdown pass from Jordan Jefferson to Russell Shepard. After falling behind 10-7, the Tigers scored 23 unanswered points. Shepard gave the Tigers the lead with a 50-yard touchdown run, followed by a safety, then two touchdowns from Patrick Peterson and Rueben Randle, respectively. North Carolina rallied with two touchdowns in the fourth quarter and had an opportunity to score the game-tying touchdown with only seconds remaining. The Tigers defense held their ground and earned a hard-fought 30-24 victory in Atlanta. LSU won its 6th consecutive season opener under head coach Les Miles.

=== Vanderbilt ===
| | 1 | 2 | 3 | 4 | Total |
|---|---|---|---|---|---|
| #19 Tigers | 0 | 10 | 0 | 17 | 27 |
| Commodores | 0 | 0 | 3 | 0 | 3 |

The Tigers went on the road in week two to face the Vanderbilt Commodores. After a scoreless first quarter, Russell Shepard got the scoring going with a 30-yard touchdown run. After three straight field goals (two by LSU, one by Vanderbilt), the Tigers put the game away with two touchdown runs by Alfred Blue and Stevan Ridley, respectively. The Tigers defeated the Commodores 27-3 marking a 2-0 start for the 5th consecutive season. Ridley finished the game with a season-high 159 rushing yards. LSU's defense dominated allowing just 135 total yards, and holding Vanderbilt to just 2-13 on third down.

=== Mississippi State ===
| | 1 | 2 | 3 | 4 | Total |
|---|---|---|---|---|---|
| Bulldogs | 0 | 0 | 7 | 0 | 7 |
| #15 Tigers | 3 | 9 | 14 | 3 | 29 |

The Tigers took the field in the season opener at Tiger Stadium against the Mississippi State Bulldogs. In the annual Gold Game, LSU began with 12 consecutive points and shut out the Bulldogs in the first half. After a 1-yard touchdown run by Mississippi State's Vick Ballard, the Tigers responded with a 16-yard run by Jordan Jefferson. LSU put the game away with a 2-yard touchdown run by Stevan Ridley and defeated the Bulldogs 29-7. The Tiger defense forced five interceptions, including two by Patrick Peterson. Josh Jasper kicked a school-record 5 field goals in the victory which gave the Tigers a 3-0 start. With the win, LSU extended its winning streak against Mississippi State to ten games, with their last loss coming in the 1999 season.

=== West Virginia ===
| | 1 | 2 | 3 | 4 | Total |
|---|---|---|---|---|---|
| #22 Mountaineers | 0 | 7 | 7 | 0 | 14 |
| #15 Tigers | 7 | 10 | 0 | 3 | 20 |

In their week four matchup, LSU faced #20 West Virginia. Stevan Ridley scored on a 1-yard touchdown run at the end of the first quarter, and the Tigers held the lead the rest of the game. With 9:39 remaining in the first half, Patrick Peterson scored on a 60-yard punt return touchdown. After the play, Peterson struck the famous Heisman Trophy pose for which he was penalized for excessive celebration. The Tigers went on to defeat the Mountaineers 20-14. LSU relied heavily on its defense and special teams, getting an interception and a fumble recovery from Freshman Tyrann Mathieu, and two field goals from kicker Josh Jasper.

=== Tennessee ===
| | 1 | 2 | 3 | 4 | Total |
|---|---|---|---|---|---|
| Volunteers | 7 | 0 | 0 | 7 | 14 |
| #12 Tigers | 7 | 0 | 0 | 9 | 16 |

LSU faced Tennessee in week five for the first time since the 2006 season. The game started with a bang with an 83-yard touchdown run by Jordan Jefferson just two minutes into the game. Tennessee answered with just seconds remaining in the first quarter with a 1-yard touchdown run by Tauren Poole. After a scoreless 2nd and 3rd quarter, the game became much more entertaining in the fourth. Tennessee took a 14-10 lead on a 3-yard run by quarterback Matt Simms. LSU drove all the way down the field, but Jarrett Lee threw an interception in the endzone to give the Vols possession. Tennessee took the ball into field goal range, but was stopped on a fourth-and-one to give the ball back the Tigers. Led by Lee, LSU took the ball all the way down to the 2-yard line. Jefferson attempted to run into the end zone, but was stopped short. With the seconds ticking away and without having any timeouts, the Tigers frantically tried to make substitutions and score the go-ahead touchdown. However, with only seconds remaining, LSU's center T-Bob Hebert snapped the ball to an unaware Jefferson, the ball was fumbled, and Tennessee fell on it with no time remaining. The scoreboard in the stadium and on TV read that Tennessee won 14-10, and the two teams started leaving the field. However, Tennessee was penalized for having 13 men on the field when the ball was snapped, and the Tigers got one more untimed down. Stevan Ridley scored the game-winning 1-yard touchdown run, giving LSU the win in dramatic fashion.

=== Florida ===
| | 1 | 2 | 3 | 4 | Total |
|---|---|---|---|---|---|
| #12 Tigers | 3 | 17 | 0 | 13 | 33 |
| #14 Gators | 0 | 14 | 0 | 15 | 29 |

After an unbelievable win against Tennessee, LSU traveled to Gainesville to face the Florida Gators. The Tigers controlled the game at halftime as they held a 20-14 lead. After a scoreless 3rd quarter, Jordan Jefferson scored early in the 4th on a 3-yard touchdown run. The Tigers looked to be in complete control with a 26-14 4th quarter lead, but Florida's Andre Dubose returned the ensuing kickoff 88 yards for a touchdown. The Gators took a 29-26 lead on a 5-yard run by Mike Gillislee with 3 minutes remaining. The Tigers took possession and drove all the way down to the Florida 36-yard line with 35 seconds remaining. Facing fourth-and-three, LSU lined up for a 54-yard field goal. However, holder Derek Helton flipped the ball over his head to kicker Josh Jasper who then ran for the first down. On the next play, Jarrett Lee hit Terrance Toliver for a 28-yard gain, and two plays later the two connected for the game-winning 3-yard touchdown. LSU escaped Gainesville with a hard-fought 33-29 victory, and their first win over Florida since their 2007 BCS National Championship season.

=== McNeese State ===
| | 1 | 2 | 3 | 4 | Total |
|---|---|---|---|---|---|
| Cowboys | 7 | 3 | 0 | 0 | 10 |
| #9 Tigers | 7 | 9 | 6 | 10 | 32 |

The Tigers returned home in week seven to face McNeese State, the second-winningest football program in the state of Louisiana. The Cowboys scored first, but LSU answered with a 2-yard touchdown run by Stevan Ridley. The Tigers fell behind 10-7 early in the second quarter, but regained the lead on another touchdown run by Ridley. The game was put away with two touchdown runs by Freshman Michael Ford. LSU defeated McNesse 32-10, extending its regular season non-conference winning streak to 32 games, the longest in the nation. With the win, LSU started 7-0 for the first time since 1973. The win also marked the Tigers' 26th straight victory over teams from the state of Louisiana.

=== Auburn ===
| | 1 | 2 | 3 | 4 | Total |
|---|---|---|---|---|---|
| #6 LSU Tigers | 3 | 7 | 0 | 7 | 17 |
| #5 Auburn Tigers | 7 | 3 | 7 | 7 | 24 |

LSU faced Auburn in week eight in a matchup of the two remaining undefeated teams in the SEC. Eventual Heisman Trophy winner Cam Newton scored the game's first points on a 1-yard touchdown run. With just seconds remaining in the first half, Jordan Jefferson tied the game at 10-10 with a 2-yard touchdown run. In what was considered a Heisman-moment play, Newton ran for a huge 49-yard touchdown giving Auburn a 17-10 lead in the 3rd quarter. Early in the 4th, LSU used a trick play to tie the game 17-17, with running back Spencer Ware tossing a 39-yard touchdown to Rueben Randle. With 5 minutes to play, Auburn's Onterio McCalebb ran for a 70-yard touchdown. LSU was stopped on a fourth-and-six with 3 minutes left to seal the 24-17 win for Auburn. In the victory, Cam Newton set the SEC record for most rushing yards by a quarterback in a single season.

=== Alabama ===
| | 1 | 2 | 3 | 4 | Total |
|---|---|---|---|---|---|
| #5 Crimson Tide | 0 | 7 | 7 | 7 | 21 |
| #12 Tigers | 3 | 0 | 7 | 14 | 24 |

s football team 1 2 3 4 Total

1. 6 Alabama 0 7 7 7 21

• #12 LSU 3 0 7 14 24 Location: Baton Rouge, Louisiana Game start: 2:37 pm Elapsed time: 3:29 Game attendance: 92,969 Game weather: 62°, Sunny Referee: Matt Austin TV announcers (CBS): Verne Lundquist (play-by-play), Gary Danielson (color), Tracy Wolfson (sideline) Sources:[96][97] Coming off their bye week and in what was dubbed by some as "Saban Bowl IV," Alabama was upset by their long-time rival, the LSU Tigers 24–21.[98][99][100] LSU scored first on a 45-yard Josh Jasper field goal to take a 3–0 lead.[101] Alabama scored their first points early in the second quarter on a one-yard Greg McElroy touchdown pass to Trent Richardson to take a 7–3 lead at the half.[101]

Both teams traded touchdowns in the third. The Tigers scored first on a 75-yard Rueben Randle reception from Jordan Jefferson, and the Crimson Tide responded with a five-yard Mark Ingram touchdown run.[101] LSU scored 14 fourth quarter points to secure the victory with a pair of Jasper field goals and a one-yard Stevan Ridley touchdown run and a successful two-point conversion.[101] Alabama responded with a nine-yard Julio Jones touchdown reception, but was unable to get a defensive stop late in the game preserving the 24–21 LSU victory.[101] Turnovers proved costly for Alabama with LSU scoring field goals on drives after a McElroy interception in the first and fumble in the fourth.[101] The loss brought Alabama's all-time record against the Tigers to 45–24–5.[102]

=== Louisiana-Monroe ===
- With this victory, LSU extends its winning streak in non-conference games to 33, the longest in the nation.

| | 1 | 2 | 3 | 4 | Total |
|---|---|---|---|---|---|
| Warhawks | 0 | 0 | 0 | 0 | 0 |
| #5 Tigers | 13 | 10 | 21 | 7 | 51 |

=== Ole Miss ===
- LSU leads this series 55–39–4
- The Rebels have won in their past 2 meetings, but their last win prior to that was in 2001

| | 1 | 2 | 3 | 4 | Total |
|---|---|---|---|---|---|
| Rebels | 10 | 7 | 7 | 12 | 36 |
| #5 Tigers | 10 | 10 | 3 | 20 | 43 |

=== Arkansas ===
| | 1 | 2 | 3 | 4 | Total |
|---|---|---|---|---|---|
| #6 Tigers | 0 | 14 | 6 | 3 | 23 |
| #12 Razorbacks | 7 | 14 | 0 | 10 | 31 |

- LSU leads this series 34–19–2
- Their last 3 meetings have been decided by 3 points or less, 2 of which going into overtime

=== Texas A&M – Cotton Bowl Classic ===
| | 1 | 2 | 3 | 4 | Total |
|---|---|---|---|---|---|
| #11 Tigers | 7 | 21 | 7 | 6 | 41 |
| #18 Aggies | 10 | 7 | 0 | 7 | 24 |

- LSU leads the series, 26–20–3

== Statistics ==
=== Passing ===
| Name | GP | GS | Effic | Comp | Att | Yards | Pct | TD | Int | Long | Avg/G |
|---|---|---|---|---|---|---|---|---|---|---|---|
| Jordan Jefferson | 13 | 13 | 114.7 | 118 | 209 | 1411 | 56.5 | 7 | 10 | 75 | 108.5 |
| Jarret Lee | 12 | 0 | 119.9 | 54 | 89 | 573 | 60.7 | 2 | 1 | 47 | 47.8 |
| Spencer Ware | 11 | 0 | 757.6 | 1 | 1 | 39 | 100.0 | 1 | 0 | 39 | 3.5 |
| TEAM | 9 | 0 | 0.0 | 0 | 2 | 0 | 0.0 | 0 | 0 | 0 | 0 |
| TOTAL | 13 | 13 | 117.6 | 173 | 301 | 2023 | 57.5 | 10 | 11 | 75 | 155.6 |

=== Rushing ===
| Name | GP | GS | Att | Yards | Avg | TD | Long | Avg/G |
|---|---|---|---|---|---|---|---|---|
| Stevan Ridley | 13 | 7 | 249 | 1147 | 4.6 | 15 | 65 | 88.2 |
| Jordan Jefferson | 13 | 13 | 123 | 450 | 3.7 | 7 | 83 | 34.6 |
| Michael Ford | 10 | 2 | 45 | 244 | 5.4 | 3 | 36 | 24.4 |
| Russell Shepard | 13 | 9 | 32 | 226 | 7.1 | 2 | 50 | 17.4 |
| Spencer Ware | 11 | 0 | 24 | 175 | 7.3 | 1 | 26 | 15.9 |
| Alfred Blue | 11 | 1 | 20 | 101 | 5.1 | 1 | 16 | 9.2 |
| Richard Murphy | 11 | 2 | 25 | 85 | 3.4 | 0 | 18 | 7.7 |
| Josh Jasper | 13 | 0 | 3 | 45 | 15 | 0 | 29 | 3.5 |
| Deangelo Peterson | 10 | 3 | 1 | 23 | 23.0 | 0 | 23 | 2.3 |
| TEAM | 9 | 0 | 6 | -36 | -6.0 | 0 | 0 | -4.0 |
| Jarrett Lee | 12 | 0 | 10 | -46 | -4.6 | 0 | 8 | -3.8 |
| TOTAL | 13 | 13 | 538 | 2414 | 4.5 | 29 | 83 | 185.7 |

=== Team ===
| Statistic | LSU | Opponents |
|---|---|---|
| Scoring | 386 | 237 |
| Points per game | 29.7 | 18.2 |
| First downs | 228 | 211 |
| Rushing | 132 | 96 |
| Passing | 84 | 96 |
| Penalty | 12 | 19 |
| Total offense | 4437 | 3993 |
| Avg per play | 5.3 | 4.9 |
| Avg per game | 341.3 | 307.2 |
| Fumbles-Lost | 25-13 | 32-13 |
| Penalties-Yards | 77-603 | 70-555 |
| Avg per game | 46.4 | 42.7 |

| Statistic | LSU | Opponents |
|---|---|---|
| Punts-Yards | 55-2415 | 68-2844 |
| Avg per punt | 43.9 | 41.8 |
| Time of possession/Game | 30:10 | 29:50 |
| 3rd down conversions | 70 / 183 (38%) | 61 / 176 (35%) |
| 4th down conversions | 11 / 12 (92%) | 11 / 21 (52%) |
| Touchdowns scored | 43 | 31 |
| Field goals-Attempts-Long | 28-34-53 | 7-14-48 |
| PAT-Attempts | 36-37 (97%) | 28-28 (100%) |
| Red-Zone Scores | 44-51 (86%) | 26-32 (81%) |
| Red-Zone Touchdowns | 27-51 (53%) | 21-32 (66%) |
| Attendance | 649,023 | 270,920 |
| Games/Avg per Game | 7 / 92,718 | 4 / 67,730 |

==== Scores by quarter ====
| | 1 | 2 | 3 | 4 | Total |
|---|---|---|---|---|---|
| Opponents | 48 | 72 | 38 | 79 | 237 |
| Tigers | 70 | 140 | 64 | 112 | 386 |

== Rankings ==
Ranking movements Legend: ██ Increase in ranking ██ Decrease in ranking
| | Week | | | | | | | | | | | | | | | |
| Poll | Pre | 1 | 2 | 3 | 4 | 5 | 6 | 7 | 8 | 9 | 10 | 11 | 12 | 13 | 14 | Final |
|---|---|---|---|---|---|---|---|---|---|---|---|---|---|---|---|---|
| AP | 21 | 19 | 15 | 15 | 12 | 12 | 9 | 6 | 12 | 12 | 5 | 5 | 6 | 11 | 11 | 8 |
| Coaches | 16 | 16 | 12 | 12 | 10 | 9 | 9 | 6 | 13 | 11 | 6 | 6 | 6 | 12 | 12 | 8 |
| Harris | Not released | | | | | | 9 | 6 | 12 | 12 | 6 | 6 | 6 | 11 | 11 | Not released |
| BCS | Not released | | | | | | | 6 | 12 | 10 | 5 | 5 | 5 | 10 | 11 | Not released |

== LSU Tigers in the 2011 National Football League Draft ==
| Player | Position | Round | Pick | Overall | NFL team |
|---|---|---|---|---|---|
| Patrick Peterson | Defensive back | 1 | 5 | 5 | Arizona Cardinals |
| Kelvin Sheppard | Linebacker | 3 | 4 | 68 | Buffalo Bills |
| Stevan Ridley | Running back | 3 | 9 | 73 | New England Patriots |
| Drake Nevis | Defensive tackle | 3 | 23 | 87 | Indianapolis Colts |
| Joseph Barksdale | Offensive Lineman | 3 | 28 | 92 | Oakland Raiders |
| Lazarius Levingston | Defensive Lineman | 7 | 2 | 205 | Seattle Seahawks |
