= Jordan Jefferson =

American football player and coach (born 1990)

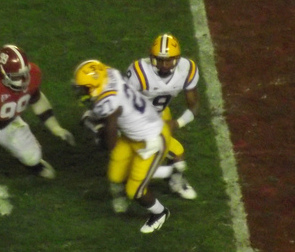
- Jefferson (9) with the LSU Tigers in 2011

No. 9
- Position: Quarterback

Personal information
- Born: August 25, 1990 (age 36); Covington, Louisiana, U.S.
- Listed height: 6 ft 4 in (1.93 m)
- Listed weight: 223 lb (101 kg)

Career information
- High school: Destrehan (LA)
- College: LSU (2008–2011)
- NFL draft: 2012: undrafted

Career history

Playing
- Tampa Bay Buccaneers (2012)*; Montreal Alouettes (2012)*; Pittsburgh Power (2013); Omaha Mammoths (2014)
- * Offseason or practice squad member only

Coaching
- Colorado State (2019) Graduate assistant

Awards and highlights
- 2014 FXFL All-Star

Career AFL statistics
- Comp-Att: 108–196
- Passing yards: 1,190
- TD–INT: 19–5
- Rushing yards: 160
- Rushing touchdowns: 2
- Stats at ArenaFan.com
- Stats at CFL.ca (archive)

Jordan Jamal Jefferson (born August 25, 1990) is an American former football quarterback. He was signed by the Tampa Bay Buccaneers as an undrafted free agent in 2012. Jefferson played college football for the LSU Tigers from 2008 to 2011.

== Early life ==
Jefferson lived in St. Rose, Louisiana and attended Destrehan High School in Destrehan, Louisiana, where he was one of the top prep quarterbacks in the country.

As a junior in 2006, Jefferson guided Destrehan to an undefeated 6–0 start before suffering a broken wrist after slamming it into the helmet of another player. Jefferson completed 81 of 143 (56.6%) passes for 1,666 yards, 20 touchdowns, and 4 interceptions. Jefferson had a passer rating of 195.1.

As a senior in 2007, Jefferson helped Destrehan High School clinch the Class 5A state championship, finishing with a 15–0 record. He completed 188 of 290 (64.8%) passes for 2,846 yards, 24 touchdowns, and only 3 interceptions during Destrehan's championship season. Jefferson had a passer rating of 172.5. Jefferson was the Class 5A Offensive Player of the Year, and he was named to the Class 5A All-State first-team.

Jefferson finished his high school career with a perfect record (21–0) as a starter. He was named a high school All-America by SuperPrep Magazine. Scout.com named him a Top 20 quarterback. Rivals.com gave him four stars, rated him as a Top 10 pro-style quarterback, and listed him in their Top 250 and Louisiana Top 40. Jefferson was named a 2008 Baton Rouge Advocate Super Dozen selection.

== College career ==
=== 2008 season ===
As a true freshman in 2008, Jefferson appeared in seven games, starting two of them including the 2008 Chick-fil-A Bowl of which he was the offensive MVP in a 38–3 win over Georgia Tech.

=== 2009 season ===
As a sophomore in 2009, Jefferson was the youngest starting quarterback in the SEC and the youngest to start a season-opener for LSU since Y. A. Tittle in 1945. He started 12 of LSU's 13 games, missing the game against Louisiana Tech due to injury. He was 8–4 as a starter, throwing for 2,166 yards, 17 touchdowns, and 7 interceptions. Jefferson and the LSU Tigers lost the 2010 Capital One Bowl to the Penn State Nittany Lions 19–17.

=== 2010 season ===
In the 2010 regular season, Jefferson threw for 1,253 yards, 4 touchdowns, and 9 interceptions while sharing the quarterback duties with Jarrett Lee. He also rushed for 450 yards and 7 touchdowns; both are LSU records for a quarterback. Jefferson led the Tigers to a 10–2 record in the regular season and beat the Texas A&M Aggies in the 2011 Cotton Bowl Classic with a final score of 41–24. In that game, Jefferson threw for 158 yards and 3 touchdowns. He also rushed for 67 yards and 1 touchdown.

Jefferson threw a key pass to running back Stevan Ridley in the LSU game with Alabama on November 6. The Tigers prevailed over the Crimson Tide, 24–21.

=== 2011 season ===
Jefferson was suspended for the first part of the 2011 season after being charged by the Baton Rouge Police with second-degree battery, but he was reinstated to the team after a Grand Jury reduced the charge from a felony to a misdemeanor. Jefferson entered a plea of innocent to the misdemeanor charge.

Jefferson returned to play in the fifth game (Kentucky). On his very first play (fourth down), he scored LSU's first touchdown of the game and gave LSU a lead which it never relinquished. Over the course of his first four games back (Kentucky, Florida, Tennessee, and Auburn), Jefferson completed 6 of 10 (60%) passes for 123 yards, 2 touchdowns, and no interceptions for a passer rating of 229.3. He also rushed for 111 yards and 2 touchdowns.

==== November 5 game at Alabama ====
Jefferson was briefly substituted for Jarrett Lee to pick up a third and one on the fifth play of the game. Following a Lee interception which led to a blocked field goal attempt by Alabama, Jefferson came in for Lee again. Jefferson closed out the first half by driving LSU 74 yards to tie the game. Lee was given another chance on LSU's second possession of the second half, but he immediately threw his second interception of the game which led to an Alabama field goal and lead. In overtime, Jefferson executed a short-side option to Michael Ford to set up the game-winning field goal.

Lee was pulled after the November game against Alabama for his performance. Lee finished the game 3 of 7 (43%) for 24 yards with two interceptions and a passer rating of 14.5. Jefferson started the final five games of the year.

==== Final three regular season games ====
Jefferson's final three regular season games were LSU's most productive games in 2011 for total yards and yards per play. In all three games, LSU gained over 450 yards; LSU had gained over 450 yards only once in the prior nine games. Jefferson had a perfect game passing against Ole Miss, and he passed for over 200 yards against Arkansas. LSU averaged nearly 10 points more per game and nearly doubled the rushing yards when Jefferson started as QB. Jefferson finished the regular season with a passer rating of 163.5, highest among SEC starting QBs. Of LSU's final three regular season opponents, one-third of the opponents were ranked in the Top 25 at the end of the season. Arkansas was ranked 3rd. Of LSU's first eight regular season opponents, only one-fourth of the opponents were ranked. Oregon was ranked 4th, and West Virginia was ranked 17th. Auburn was the only other team to receive a Top 25 vote. Northwestern State is an FCS school.

==== Post-season games ====
Jefferson led LSU to a 42–10 win over Georgia in the 2011 SEC Championship Game. In the 2012 BCS National Championship Game, Jefferson struggled against an Alabama defense seeking redemption from a regular season loss against a Jefferson led LSU Tiger team at Alabama's home field. Although Jefferson completed nearly 65% of his passes, he was ineffective in executing the option and moving the LSU offense.

=== College statistics ===
Jefferson threw for 4,733 yards and 34 touchdowns during his career. As of 2020, he ranks sixth for career wins by a starting quarterback at LSU with 24, and is tied for seventh in LSU history in passing touchdowns (34) and as of the end of his career was sixth in rushing touchdowns by a quarterback (12). As of 2020, he is eighth in LSU history in career passing yards (4,733), and at the end of his career was eighth in completion percentage (58.7), sixth in career completions (398), and sixth in attempts (678).

Jefferson holds the LSU record for rushing yards by a quarterback with 1,018 yards. Jefferson’s ability to run the ball forced opposing defenses to account for him which allowed LSU to defeat opponents through its rushing attack. LSU’s emphasis on its ground game coupled with Jefferson sharing time with Jarrett Lee reduced Jefferson’s passing yardage. Thus, Jefferson threw for less than 100 yards in 11 games, or 34% of all games he started. However, of those 11 games, LSU only lost 3 games.

College statistics
Year	Team	Games		Passing						Rushing			
Year	Team	GP	GS	Cmp	Att	Yds	Avg	TD	Int	Att	Yds	Avg	TD
2008	LSU	5	2	36	73	419	83.8	4	1	49	134	2.7	1
2009	LSU	12	12	182	296	2,166	180.5	17	7	112	171	1.5	1
2010	LSU	13	13	119	209	1,411	108.5	7	10	123	450	3.7	7
2011	LSU	9	5	61	100	737	81.9	6	2	75	263	3.5	3
Totals		39	32	398	678	4,733	121.4	34	20	359	1,018	2.8	12

== Professional career ==
Pre-draft measurables
Height	Weight	Arm length	Hand span	Wingspan	40-yard dash	10-yard split	20-yard split	20-yard shuttle	Three-cone drill	Vertical jump	Broad jump	Bench press
6 ft 4 1/8 in (1.93 m)	223 lb (101 kg)	33 in (0.84 m)	10 1/4 in (0.26 m)	6 ft 5 3/8 in (1.97 m)	4.65 s	1.61 s	2.66 s	4.06 s	6.81 s	36.5 in (0.93 m)	9 ft 8 in (2.95 m)	14 reps
All values from NFL Combine

Jefferson was one of eight LSU players invited to the 2012 NFL Scouting Combine. Although he had the lowest grade prior to the Combine, Jefferson was the only quarterback to finish among the top five in each test during the event. Among the quarterbacks, Jefferson finished first in the 20-yard shuttle, tied for first in the bench press, and finished third in the 40-yard dash and the vertical jump.

Jefferson went undrafted in the 2012 NFL draft, but was invited to try out at the Tampa Bay Buccaneers' rookie minicamp. The team signed Jefferson to a contract on May 7, 2012, but was waived four days later so that Tampa Bay could have a replacement for Da'Quan Bowers, a projected starter who suffered a probable season-ending injury.

On August 10, 2012, Jefferson signed with the Montreal Alouettes of the Canadian Football League and was assigned to the practice squad. On October 25, 2012, ESPN reported, citing WAFB in Baton Rouge, LA, that Jefferson was arrested and charged with simple possession of marijuana, along with 3 other former LSU football players, including former Heisman Trophy finalist Tyrann Mathieu. On October 30, 2012, Louisiana State Judge Chip Moore revoked Jefferson's bond in his 2011 simple battery case and ordered him to report to parish prison by 2 p.m. (that day) due to his arrest on a marijuana charge. Jefferson was subsequently released by the Alouettes.

Jefferson signed with the Pittsburgh Power of the Arena Football League for the 2013 season. He was named the starter one week before the Power began the season.

Jefferson signed with the Omaha Mammoths of the Fall Experimental Football League for the 2014 season, where he was the starting quarterback. The Mammoths finished their first and only season in second place with a record of 3–1, declining to play a championship game.

== Coaching career ==
Jefferson was a graduate assistant wide receivers coach at Colorado State during the 2019 college football season.

== Personal life ==
His brothers, Justin and Rickey, both also played college football at LSU. Justin was selected 22nd overall in the first round of the 2020 NFL draft to the Minnesota Vikings.
