= 2010 Southeastern Conference football season =

- League: NCAA Division I FBS
- Sport: football
- Duration: September 2, 2010 through January 10, 2011
- Teams: 12
- TV partner(s): CBS, ESPN, ESPN2, ESPNU, SEC Network, FSN, CSS

2011 NFL Draft
- Top draft pick: Cam Newton (Auburn)
- Picked by: Carolina Panthers, 1st overall

Regular season
- Season champions: Auburn Tigers
- East champions: South Carolina Gamecocks
- East runners-up: Florida Gators
- West champions: Auburn Tigers
- West runners-up: Arkansas Razorbacks; LSU Tigers

SEC Championship Game

Football seasons
- 2009 2011

2010 Southeastern Conference football standings
	Conf.			Overall
Team	W		L	W		L
Eastern Division
No. 22 South Carolina x	5	–	3	9	–	5
Florida	4	–	4	8	–	5
Georgia	3	–	5	6	–	7
Tennessee	3	–	5	6	–	7
Kentucky	2	–	6	6	–	7
Vanderbilt	1	–	7	2	–	10
Western Division
No. 1 Auburn x$#	8	–	0	14	–	0
No. 12 Arkansas %	6	–	2	10	–	3
No. 8 LSU	6	–	2	11	–	2
No. 10 Alabama	5	–	3	10	–	3
No. 15 Mississippi State	4	–	4	9	–	4
Ole Miss*	1	–	7	4	–	8
Championship: Auburn 56, South Carolina 17
# – BCS National Champion; $ – BCS representative as conference champion; % – BCS at-large representative; x – Division champion/co-champions; * Ole Miss vacated all wins due to NCAA violations.; Rankings from AP Poll

The 2010 Southeastern Conference football season began on Thursday, September 2, 2010 with South Carolina defeating Southern Miss on ESPN.

== Preseason ==
Tennessee head coach Lane Kiffin left after his first season in Knoxville for Southern Cal. Kiffin was replaced by Louisiana Tech head coach Derek Dooley. Dooley opened his first season on September 4 against University of Tennessee – Martin.

Kentucky head coach Rich Brooks retired after seven seasons in Lexington, ending a coaching career that lasted over 40 years. As agreed on in 2008, Brooks was replaced by his offensive coordinator Joker Phillips, who began his first season as head coach on September 4 against archrival Louisville.

In July 2010, Vanderbilt head coach Bobby Johnson unexpectedly retired. He was replaced on an interim basis by Robbie Caldwell, who had the dual titles of Vanderbilt assistant head coach and offensive line coach in 2009. Caldwell made his Vanderbilt head coaching debut on September 4 against Northwestern.

2010 Pre-season Coaches All-SEC

Position	Player	Class	Team
First Team Offense
QB	Ryan Mallett	Jr.	Arkansas
RB	Mark Ingram II	Jr.	Alabama
RB	Derrick Locke	Sr.	Kentucky
WR	Julio Jones	Jr.	Alabama
WR	A. J. Green	Jr.	Georgia
TE	DJ Williams	Sr.	Arkansas
AP	Randall Cobb	Jr.	Kentucky
OL	Clint Boling	Sr.	Georgia
OL	Carl Johnson	Sr.	Florida
OL	Barrett Jones	So.	Alabama
OL	Lee Ziemba	Sr.	Auburn
C	Mike Pouncey	Sr.	Florida
First Team Defense
DL	Marcell Dareus	Jr.	Alabama
DL	Jerrell Powe	Sr.	Ole Miss
DL	Cliff Matthews	Sr.	South Carolina
LB	Josh Bynes	Sr.	Auburn
LB	Dont'a Hightower	So.	Alabama
LB	Chris Marve	Jr.	Vanderbilt
LB	Kelvin Sheppard	Sr.	LSU
DB	Mark Barron	Jr.	Alabama
DB	Patrick Peterson	JR.	LSU
DB	Stephon Gilmore	So.	South Carolina
DB	Janoris Jenkins	Jr.	Florida
First Team Special Teams
K	Blair Walsh	Jr.	Georgia
P	Blair Walsh	Jr.	Georgia
RS	Warren Norman	So.	Vanderbilt

== Rankings ==
Legend
Increase in ranking
Decrease in ranking
Not ranked previous week

Kentucky, Ole Miss, Tennessee, and Vanderbilt went unranked throughout the season in the rankings shown below (AP and Coaches polls, and BCS standings).

		(Pre) Aug 21	Sept. 7	Sept. 12	Sept. 19	Sept. 26	Oct.	Oct. 10	Oct. 17	Oct. 24	Oct. 31	Nov. 7	Nov. 14	Nov. 21	Nov. 28	Dec. 5	Final
Alabama	AP	1	1	1	1	1	1	8	7	6	5	11	10	9	17	15	10
Alabama	C	1	1	1	1	1	1	8	7	6	5	12	12	11	19	18	11
Alabama	BCS	Not released							8	7	6	12	11	11	16	16	
Arkansas	AP	17	14	12	10	15	11	12	21	19	17	14	13	12	8	8	12
Arkansas	C	19	15	13	11	15	13	13	21	18	19	14	13	12	8	8	12
Arkansas	BCS	Not released							23	19	18	15	13	12	7	8	
Auburn	AP	22	21	16	17	10	8	7	5	3	3	2	2	2	2	1	1
Auburn	C	23	20	15	14	11	8	7	5	3	2	2	2	2	2	2	1
Auburn	BCS	Not released							4	1	2	2	2	2	1	1	
Florida	AP	4	8	10	9	7	14	22	NR			24	NR				
Florida	C	3	6	7	8	7	12	22	NR			24	NR				
Florida	BCS	Not released										22	NR				
Georgia	AP	23	22	NR													
Georgia	C	21	19	NR													
Georgia	BCS	Not released															
Kentucky	AP																
Kentucky	C																
Kentucky	BCS	Not released															
LSU	AP	21	19	15	15	12	12	9	6	12	12	5	5	6	11	11	8
LSU	C	16	16	12	12	10	9	9	6	13	11	6	6	6	12	12	8
LSU	BCS	Not released							6	12	10	5	5	5	10	11	
Mississippi State	AP								24	23	21	17	22	25	22	21	15
Mississippi State	C								24	23	21	18	22	25	22	22	17
Mississippi State	BCS	Not released							24	21	20	19	21	25	22	21	
Ole Miss	AP																
Ole Miss	C																
Ole Miss	BCS	Not released															
South Carolina	AP		24	13	12	20	19	10	19	17	18	22	17	18	18	19	22
South Carolina	C		25	16	15	22	20	12	20	17	17	22	17	17	16	20	22
South Carolina	BCS	Not released							21	20	19	23	17	18	19	20	
Tennessee	AP																
Tennessee	C																
Tennessee	BCS	Not released															
Vanderbilt	AP																
Vanderbilt	C																
Vanderbilt	BCS	Not released															

== Regular season ==
Index to colors and formatting
SEC member won
SEC member lost
SEC teams in **bold**

All times Eastern time.

Rankings reflect that of the AP poll for that week until week eight when the BCS rankings will be used.

=== Week One ===
Date	Time	Visiting team	Home team	Site	Broadcast	Result	Attendance
September 2	7:30 pm	Southern Miss	**South Carolina**	Williams-Brice Stadium • Columbia, South Carolina	ESPN	**W** 41–13	70,438
September 4	12:00 pm	Miami (OH)	#4 **Florida**	Ben Hill Griffin Stadium • Gainesville, Florida	ESPN	**W** 34–12	90,178
September 4	12:21 pm	Louisiana–Lafayette	#23 **Georgia**	Sanford Stadium • Athens, Georgia	SEC Network	**W** 55–7	92,746
September 4	3:30 pm	**Kentucky**	Louisville	Papa John's Cardinal Stadium • Louisville, Kentucky	ABC	**W** 23–16	55,327
September 4	3:30 pm	Jacksonville State	**Mississippi**	Vaught–Hemingway Stadium • Oxford, Mississippi	CSS	**L** 48–49^{2OT}	55,768
September 4	6:00 pm	Tennessee-Martin	**Tennessee**	Neyland Stadium • Knoxville, Tennessee	PPV	**W** 50–0	99,123
September 4	7:00 pm	San Jose State	#1 **Alabama**	Bryant–Denny Stadium • Tuscaloosa, Alabama	PPV	**W** 48–3	101,821
September 4	7:00 pm	Arkansas State	#22 **Auburn**	Jordan–Hare Stadium • Auburn, Alabama	FSN South	**W** 52–26	83,441
September 4	7:00 pm	Tennessee Tech	#17 **Arkansas**	Razorback Stadium • Fayetteville, Arkansas	PPV	**W** 44–3	69,596
September 4	7:00 pm	Memphis	**Mississippi State**	Davis Wade Stadium • Starkville, Mississippi	ESPNU	**W** 49–7	56,032
September 4	7:30 pm	Northwestern	**Vanderbilt**	Vanderbilt Stadium • Nashville, Tennessee	CSS	**L** 21–23	37,210
September 4	8:00 pm	#21 **LSU**	#18 North Carolina	Georgia Dome • Atlanta	ABC	**W** 30–24	68,919

Players of the week:

Offensive		Defensive		Special teams	
Player	Team	Player	Team	Player	Team
Cam Newton	Auburn	Danny Trevathan	Kentucky	Patrick Peterson	LSU

=== Week Two ===
Date	Time	Visiting team	Home team	Site	Broadcast	Result	Attendance
September 9	7:30 pm	#21 **Auburn**	**Mississippi State**	Davis Wade Stadium • Starkville, Mississippi	ESPN	**AUB** 17–14	54,806
September 11	12:00 pm	#22 **Georgia**	#24 **South Carolina**	Williams-Brice Stadium • Columbia, South Carolina	ESPN	**USC** 17–6	80,974
September 11	12:21 pm	South Florida	#8 **Florida**	Ben Hill Griffin Stadium • Gainesville, Florida	SEC Network	**W** 38–14	90,612
September 11	7:00 pm	#19 **LSU**	**Vanderbilt**	Vanderbilt Stadium • Nashville, Tennessee	ESPNU	**LSU** 27–3	36,940
September 11	7:00 pm	#19 Penn State	#1 **Alabama**	Bryant–Denny Stadium • Tuscaloosa, Alabama	ESPN	**W** 24–3	101,821
September 11	7:00 pm	Louisiana–Monroe	#14 **Arkansas**	War Memorial Stadium • Little Rock, Arkansas	FSN	**W** 31–7	55,705
September 11	7:00 pm	#7 Oregon	**Tennessee**	Neyland Stadium • Knoxville, Tennessee	ESPN2	**L** 48–13	102,035
September 11	7:30 pm	Western Kentucky	**Kentucky**	Commonwealth Stadium • Lexington, Kentucky	CSS	**W** 63–28	66,584
September 11	9:00 pm	**Ole Miss**	Tulane	Louisiana Superdome • New Orleans	ESPN2	**W** 27–13	36,389

Players of the week:

Offensive		Defensive		Special teams	
Player	Team	Player	Team	Player	Team
Trent Richardson; Marcus Lattimore	Alabama; South Carolina	Nick Farley	Auburn	Jeff Demps	Florida

=== Week Three ===
Date	Time	Visiting team	Home team	Site	Broadcast	Result	Attendance
September 18	12:00 pm	#12 **Arkansas**	**Georgia**	Sanford Stadium • Athens, Georgia	ESPN	**ARK** 31–24	92,746
September 18	12:21 pm	**Vanderbilt**	**Ole Miss**	Vaught–Hemingway Stadium • Oxford, Mississippi	SEC Network	**VAN** 28–14	51,667
September 18	3:30 pm	#10 **Florida**	**Tennessee**	Neyland Stadium • Knoxville, Tennessee	CBS	**FLA** 31–17	102,455
September 18	3:30 pm	#1 **Alabama**	Duke	Wallace Wade Stadium • Durham, North Carolina	ABC	**W** 62–13	39,042
September 18	7:00 pm	**Mississippi State**	#15 **LSU**	Tiger Stadium • Baton Rouge, Louisiana	ESPNU	**LSU** 29–7	92,538
September 18	7:00 pm	Clemson	#16 **Auburn**	Jordan–Hare Stadium • Auburn, Alabama	ESPN	**W** 27–24^{OT}	87,451
September 18	7:00 pm	Akron	**Kentucky**	Commonwealth Stadium • Lexington, Kentucky	FSN	**W** 47–10	64,014
September 18	7:00 pm	Furman	#13 **South Carolina**	Williams-Brice Stadium • Columbia, South Carolina	PPV	**W** 38–19	73,681

Players of the week:

Offensive		Defensive		Special teams	
Player	Team	Player	Team	Player	Team
Ryan Mallett	Arkansas	Josh Bynes	Auburn	Josh Jasper	LSU

=== Week Four ===
Date	Time	Visiting team	Home team	Site	Broadcast	Result	Attendance
September 25	12:21 pm	UAB	**Tennessee**	Neyland Stadium • Knoxville, Tennessee	SEC Network	**W** 32–29^{2OT}	95,183
September 25	3:30 pm	#1 **Alabama**	#10 **Arkansas**	Razorback Stadium • Fayetteville, Arkansas	CBS	**ALA** 24–20	76,808
September 25	7:00 pm	**Kentucky**	#9 **Florida**	Ben Hill Griffin Stadium • Gainesville, Florida	ESPNU	**FLA** 48–14	90,547
September 25	7:00 pm	**Georgia**	**Mississippi State**	Davis Wade Stadium • Starkville, Mississippi	FSN	**MSST** 24–12	56,721
September 25	7:30 pm	Fresno State	**Ole Miss**	Vaught–Hemingway Stadium • Oxford, Mississippi	CSS	**W** 55–38	55,267
September 25	7:45 pm	#12 **South Carolina**	#17 **Auburn**	Jordan–Hare Stadium • Auburn, Alabama	ESPN	**AUB** 35–27	87,237
September 25	9:00 pm	#22 West Virginia	#15 **LSU**	Tiger Stadium • Baton Rouge, Louisiana	ESPN2	**W** 20–14	92,575

Players of the week:

Offensive		Defensive		Special teams	
Player	Team	Player	Team	Player	Team
Cam Newton	Auburn	Robert Lester	Alabama	Patrick Peterson	LSU

=== Week Five ===
Date	Time	Visiting team	Home team	Site	Broadcast	Result	Attendance
October 2	12:00 pm	Louisiana–Monroe	#10 **Auburn**	Jordan–Hare Stadium • Auburn, Alabama	ESPNU	**W** 52–3	80,759
October 2	12:00 pm	Alcorn State	**Mississippi State**	Davis Wade Stadium • Starkville, Mississippi	FSN	**W** 49–16	50,439
October 2	12:00 pm	**Vanderbilt**	Connecticut	Rentschler Field • Storrs, Connecticut	Big East Network	**L** 21–40	40,000
October 2	12:21 pm	**Kentucky**	**Ole Miss**	Vaught–Hemingway Stadium • Oxford, Mississippi	SEC Network	**MIS** 42–35	55,344
October 2	3:30 pm	**Tennessee**	#12 **LSU**	Tiger Stadium • Baton Rouge, Louisiana	CBS	**LSU** 16–14	92,932
October 2	4:30 pm	**Georgia**	Colorado	Folsom Field • Boulder, Colorado	FSN	**L** 27–29	52,855
October 2	8:00 pm	#7 **Florida**	#1 **Alabama**	Bryant–Denny Stadium • Tuscaloosa, Alabama	CBS	**ALA** 31–6	101,821

Players of the week:

Offensive		Defensive		Special teams	
Player	Team	Player	Team	Player	Team
Stevan Ridley	LSU	Courtney Upshaw	Alabama	Jesse Grandy	Ole Miss

=== Week Six ===
Date	Time	Visiting team	Home team	Site	Broadcast	Result	Attendance
October 9	12:21 pm	**Tennessee**	**Georgia**	Sanford Stadium • Athens, Georgia	SEC Network	**UGA** 41–14	92,746
October 9	3:30 pm	#1 **Alabama**	#19 **South Carolina**	Williams-Brice Stadium • Columbia, South Carolina	CBS	**USC** 35–21	82,993
October 9	3:30 pm	#11 **Arkansas**	Texas A&M	Cowboys Stadium • Arlington, Texas	ABC	**W** 24–17	65,662
October 9	7:00 pm	Eastern Michigan	**Vanderbilt**	Vanderbilt Stadium • Nashville, Tennessee	ESPNU	**W** 52–6	33,107
October 9	7:30 pm	#8 **Auburn**	**Kentucky**	Commonwealth Stadium • Lexington, Kentucky	ESPN2	**AUB** 37–34	70,776
October 9	7:30 pm	#12 **LSU**	#14 **Florida**	Ben Hill Griffin Stadium • Gainesville, Florida	ESPN	**LSU** 33–29	90,721
October 9	8:00 pm	**Mississippi State**	Houston	John O'Quinn Field at Robertson Stadium • Houston	CBS College Sports	**W** 47–24	32,067

Players of the week:

Offensive		Defensive		Special teams	
Player	Team	Player	Team	Player	Team
Stephen Garcia	South Carolina	Tramain Thomas	Arkansas	Wes Byrum	Auburn

=== Week Seven ===
Date	Time	Visiting team	Home team	Site	Broadcast	Result	Attendance
October 16	12:21 pm	**Vanderbilt**	**Georgia**	Sanford Stadium • Athens, Georgia	SEC Network	**UGA** 43–0	92,746
October 16	3:30 pm	No. 12 **Arkansas**	No. 7 **Auburn**	Jordan–Hare Stadium • Auburn, Alabama	CBS	**AUB** 65–43	87,451
October 16	6:00 pm	No. 10 **South Carolina**	**Kentucky**	Commonwealth Stadium • Lexington, Kentucky	ESPN2	**UK** 31–28	67,955
October 16	7:00 pm	**Mississippi State**	No. 22 **Florida**	Ben Hill Griffin Stadium • Gainesville, Florida	ESPNU	**MSST** 10–7	90,517
October 16	7:00 pm	McNeese State	**LSU**	Tiger Stadium • Baton Rouge, Louisiana	FSN	**LSU** 32–10	92,576
October 16	9:00 pm	**Ole Miss**	No. 8 **Alabama**	Bryant–Denny Stadium • Tuscaloosa, Alabama	ESPN2	**ALA** 23–10	101,821

Players of the week:

Offensive		Defensive		Special teams	
Player	Team	Player	Team	Player	Team
Cam Newton; Mike Hartline	Auburn; Kentucky	Chris White	Mississippi State	Ryan Tydlacka; Marquis Maze	Kentucky; Alabama

=== Week Eight ===
Date	Time	Visiting team	Home team	Site	Broadcast	Result	Attendance
October 23	12:21 pm	**Ole Miss**	Arkansas	Razorback Stadium • Fayetteville, Arkansas	SEC Network	**ARK** 38–24	73,619
October 23	3:30 pm	**LSU**	Auburn	Jordan–Hare Stadium • Auburn, Alabama	CBS	**AUB** 24–17	87,451
October 23	7:00 pm	**Alabama**	Tennessee	Neyland Stadium • Knoxville, Tennessee	ESPN	**ALA** 41–10	102,455
October 23	7:00 pm	UAB	Mississippi State	Davis-Wade Stadium • Starkville MS	ESPNU	**MSST** 29–24	56,423
October 23	7:00 pm	**South Carolina**	Vanderbilt	Vanderbilt Stadium • Nashville, Tennessee	FSN	**USC** 21–7	33,425
October 23	7:30 pm	**Georgia**	Kentucky	Commonwealth Stadium • Lexington, Kentucky	CSS	**UGA** 44–31	70,884

Players of the week:

Offensive		Defensive		Special teams	
Player	Team	Player	Team	Player	Team

=== Week Nine ===
Date	Time	Visiting team	Home team	Site	Broadcast	Result	Attendance
October 30	12:21 pm	**Tennessee**	**South Carolina**	Williams-Brice Stadium • Columbia, South Carolina	SEC Network	**USC** 38–24	79,336
October 30	3:30 pm	**Florida**	**Georgia**	EverBank Field • Jacksonville, Florida	CBS	**UF** 34–31	84,444
October 30	6:00 pm	**Auburn**	**Ole Miss**	Vaught–Hemingway Stadium • Oxford, Mississippi	ESPN2	**AUB** 51–31	61,474
October 30	7:00 pm	**Kentucky**	**Mississippi State**	Davis-Wade Stadium • Starkville, Mississippi	ESPNU	**MSST** 24–17	54,168
October 30	7:00 pm	**Vanderbilt**	**Arkansas**	Razorback Stadium • Fayetteville, Arkansas	FSN	**ARK** 49–14	70,430

Players of the week:

Offensive		Defensive		Special teams	
Player	Team	Player	Team	Player	Team
Ryan Mallett	Arkansas	Chris White	Mississippi State	Chas Henry	Florida

=== Week Ten ===
Date	Time	Visiting team	Home team	Site	Broadcast	Result	Attendance
November 6	12:21 pm	**Florida**	**Vanderbilt**	Vanderbilt Stadium • Nashville, Tennessee	SEC Network	**UF** 55–14	33,848
November 6	12:30 pm	Charleston Southern	**Kentucky**	Commonwealth Stadium • Lexington, Kentucky		**UK** 49–21	61,884
November 6	12:30 pm	Idaho State	**Georgia**	Sanford Stadium • Athens, Georgia	WSB	**UGA** 55–7	92,746
November 6	1:00 pm	Chattanooga	**Auburn**	Jordan–Hare Stadium • Auburn, Alabama	PPV	**AU** 62–24	87,451
November 6	7:00 pm	**Arkansas**	**South Carolina**	Williams-Brice Stadium • Columbia, South Carolina		**ARK** 41–20	75,136
November 6	7:00 pm	Louisiana–Lafayette	**Ole Miss**	Vaught–Hemingway Stadium • Oxford, Mississippi		**MISS** 43–21	53,144
November 6	8:00 pm	**Alabama**	**LSU**	Tiger Stadium • Baton Rouge, Louisiana	CBS	**LSU** 24–21	92,969
November 6	8:00 pm	**Tennessee**	Memphis	Liberty Bowl Memorial Stadium • Memphis, Tennessee	CBS CS	**UT** 50–14	39,742

Players of the week:

Offensive		Defensive		Special teams	
Player	Team	Player	Team	Player	Team

=== Week Eleven ===
Date	Time	Visiting team	Home team	Site	Broadcast	Result	Attendance
November 13	7:00 pm	Louisiana–Monroe	LSU	Tiger Stadium • Baton Rouge, Louisiana	PPV/ESPN GamePlan	**LSU** 51–0	
November 13	12:00 pm	**Vanderbilt**	Kentucky	Commonwealth Stadium • Lexington, Kentucky	SEC Network	**UK** 38–20	
November 13	12:00 pm	**Ole Miss**	Tennessee	Neyland Stadium • Knoxville, Tennessee	CBS	**UT** 52–14	
November 13	3:30 pm	**Georgia**	Auburn	Jordan–Hare Stadium • Auburn, Alabama	CBS	**AU 49–31**	
November 13	7:00 pm	UTEP	Arkansas	Razorback Stadium • Fayetteville, Arkansas	ESPNU	**ARK** 58–21	
November 13	7:15 pm	**South Carolina**	Florida	Ben Hill Griffin Stadium • Gainesville, Florida	ESPN	**USC** 36–14	90,885
November 13	7:15 pm	**Mississippi State**	Alabama	Bryant–Denny Stadium • Tuscaloosa, Alabama	ESPN2	**ALA** 30–10	

Players of the week:

Offensive		Defensive		Special teams	
Player	Team	Player	Team	Player	Team
Marcus Lattimore	South Carolina			Spencer Lanning	South Carolina

=== Week Twelve ===
Date	Time	Visiting team	Home team	Site	Broadcast	Result	Attendance
November 18	7:30 pm	Georgia State	Alabama	Bryant–Denny Stadium • Tuscaloosa, Alabama	ESPNU	**ALA** 63–7	
November 20	TBD	Appalachian State	Florida	Ben Hill Griffin Stadium • Gainesville, Florida		**UF** 48–10	
November 20	2:30 pm	**Ole Miss**	LSU	Tiger Stadium • Baton Rouge, Louisiana	CBS	**LSU** 43–36	
November 20	6:00 pm	**Arkansas**	Mississippi State	Davis Wade Stadium • Starkville, Mississippi	ESPN	**ARK** 31–28	
November 20	12:21 pm	Troy	South Carolina	Williams-Brice Stadium • Columbia, South Carolina	SEC Network	**W** 69–24	74,117
November 20	TBD	**Tennessee**	Vanderbilt	Vanderbilt Stadium • Nashville, Tennessee		**TEN** 24–10	

Players of the week:

Offensive		Defensive		Special teams	
Player	Team	Player	Team	Player	Team

=== Week Thirteen ===
Date	Time	Visiting team	Home team	Site	Broadcast	Result	Attendance
November 26	1:30 p. m.	**Auburn**	**Alabama**	Bryant–Denny Stadium • Tuscaloosa, Alabama	CBS	**AU** 28–27	101,000
November 27	2:30 p. m.	**#5 LSU**	**#12 Arkansas**	War Memorial Stadium • Little Rock, Arkansas	CBS	**ARK** 31–23	55,808
November 27	7:00 pm	**South Carolina**	Clemson	Memorial Stadium • Clemson, South Carolina	ESPN2	**USC** 29–7	81,500
November 27	2:30	**Florida**	Florida State	Doak Campbell Stadium • Tallahassee, Florida	ABC	**FSU** 31–7	
November 27	7:30	Georgia Tech	**Georgia**	Sanford Stadium • Athens, Georgia	ESPN	**UGA** 42–34	
November 27	TBD	**Mississippi State**	**Ole Miss**	Vaught–Hemingway Stadium • Oxford, Mississippi		**MSU** 31–23	
November 27	TBD	**Kentucky**	**Tennessee**	Neyland Stadium • Knoxville, Tennessee		**UT** 24–14	
November 27	TBD	Wake Forest	**Vanderbilt**	Vanderbilt Stadium • Nashville, Tennessee		**WFU** 34–13	

Players of the week:

Offensive		Defensive		Special teams	
Player	Team	Player	Team	Player	Team

=== Week Fourteen (SEC Championship Game) ===
Date	Time	Visiting team	Home team	Site	Broadcast	Result	Attendance
December 4	4:05 p. m.	No. 1 **Auburn**	#18 **South Carolina**	Georgia Dome • Atlanta, Georgia	CBS	**AU** 56–17	75,802

== SEC vs. BCS conference opponents ==
NOTE:. Games with a * next to the home team represent a neutral site game

Date	Visitor	Home	Significance	Winning team
September 4	Kentucky	Louisville	Governor's Cup	Kentucky
September 4	LSU	North Carolina*	Chick-fil-A Kickoff Game in Atlanta	LSU
September 4	Northwestern	Vanderbilt		Northwestern
September 11	Penn State	Alabama	Alabama–Penn State football rivalry	Alabama
September 11	South Florida	Florida		Florida
September 11	Oregon	Tennessee		Oregon
September 18	Alabama	Duke		Alabama
September 18	Clemson	Auburn	Auburn–Clemson football rivalry	Auburn
September 25	West Virginia	LSU		LSU
October 2	Georgia	Colorado		Colorado
October 2	Vanderbilt	Connecticut		Connecticut
October 9	Arkansas	Texas A&M*	Southwest Classic in Arlington, Texas	Arkansas
November 27	Florida	Florida State	Florida–Florida State football rivalry	Florida State
November 27	Georgia Tech	Georgia	Clean, Old-Fashioned Hate	Georgia
November 27	South Carolina	Clemson	Battle of the Palmetto State	South Carolina
November 27	Wake Forest	Vanderbilt		Wake Forest

== Bowl games ==
SEC Bowl Games
Pick	Game	Date	Location/Time*	Television	Winner^{+}	Score	Loser^{+}	Score
–	BCS National Championship Game	Jan. 10, 2011	University of Phoenix Stadium; Glendale, Arizona; 8:30 pm	ESPN	**Auburn**	22	Oregon	19
1.	Allstate Sugar Bowl	Jan. 4, 2011	Louisiana Superdome; New Orleans; 8:30 pm	ESPN	Ohio State	31	**Arkansas**	26
2.	Capital One Bowl	Jan. 1, 2011	Citrus Bowl; Orlando, Florida; 1:00 pm	ESPN	**Alabama**	49	Michigan State	7
3.	Outback Bowl	Jan. 1, 2011	Raymond James Stadium; Tampa, Florida; 1:00 pm	ABC	**Florida**	37	Penn State	24
4.	AT&T Cotton Bowl Classic	Jan. 7, 2011	Cowboys Stadium; Arlington, Texas; 8:00 pm	FOX	**LSU**	41	Texas A&M	24
5.	Chick-fil-A Bowl	Dec. 31, 2010	Georgia Dome; Atlanta; 7:30 pm	ESPN	Florida State	26	**South Carolina**	17
6.	Gator Bowl	Jan. 1, 2011	EverBank Field; Jacksonville, Florida; 1:30 pm	ESPN2	**Mississippi State**	52	Michigan	14
7.	Liberty Bowl	Dec. 31, 2010	Liberty Bowl Memorial Stadium; Memphis, Tennessee; 3:30 pm	ESPN	UCF	10	**Georgia**	6
8.	Franklin Music City Bowl	Dec. 30, 2010	LP Field; Nashville, Tennessee; 6:30 pm	ESPN	North Carolina	30	**Tennessee**	27
9.	BBVA Compass Bowl	Jan. 8, 2011	Legion Field; Birmingham, Alabama; 12:00 pm	ESPN	Pittsburgh	27	**Kentucky**	10
*Time given is Eastern Time (UTC-5).^{+}SEC team is **bolded**.

== Post-season awards and honors ==
=== All-SEC ===
The following players were named by the AP All-SEC team:

Position	Player	Class	Team
First Team Offense
QB	Cam Newton		Auburn
RB	Marcus Lattimore		South Carolina
RB	Knile Davis		Arkansas
WR	Alshon Jeffery		South Carolina
WR	Julio Jones		Alabama
TE	D. J. Williams		Arkansas
OL	Lee Ziemba		Auburn
OL	Derek Sherrod		Mississippi State
OL	DeMarcus Love		Arkansas
OL	Barrett Jones		Alabama
C	Ryan Pugh		Auburn
First Team Defense
DL	Drake Nevis		LSU
DL	Nick Fairley	Sr.	Auburn
DL	Devin Taylor		South Carolina
LB	Justin Houston		Georgia
LB	Danny Trevathan	Jr.	Kentucky
LB	Kelvin Sheppard		LSU
LB	Chris White		Mississippi State
DB	Patrick Peterson		LSU
DB	Ahmad Black		Florida
DB	Mark Barron		Alabama
DB	Janoris Jenkins		Florida
First Team Special Teams
K	Josh Jasper		LSU
P	Chas Henry		Florida
AP	Randall Cobb		Kentucky

=== All-Americans ===
Quarterback

- Cam Newton, Auburn (AFCA-Coaches, AP, Walter Camp, CBS, Rivals.com, Scout.com, SI)

Defensive tackle

- Nick Fairley, Auburn (AP, FWAA, Walter Camp, CBS, Rivals.com, Scout.com, SI)
- Drake Nevis, LSU (CBS)

Wide receiver

- Alshon Jeffery, South Carolina (AFCA-Coaches, FWAA, Rivals.com, Scout.com)

Linebacker

- Justin Houston, Georgia (FWAA)

Offensive tackle

- Lee Ziemba, Auburn (AFCA-Coaches, FWAA, SI, Walter Camp)

Secondary

- Mark Barron, Alabama (FWAA)
- Ahmad Black, Florida (CBS, Rivals.com)
- Patrick Peterson, LSU (AFCA-Coaches, AP, FWAA, Walter Camp, CBS, Rivals.com, Scout.com, SI)

All-purpose

- Randall Cobb, Kentucky (AP, SI)

Kicker/Punter

- Chas Henry, Florida (AP, Walter Camp, CBS, Rivals.com, Scout.com, SI)
- Josh Jasper LSU (FWAA)

=== National award winners ===
The following SEC players listed below have been named to the national award semifinalist and finalist lists.

2010 Heisman Trophy Winner:

- Cameron Newton, Auburn

2010 Bednarik Award Winner:

- Patrick Peterson, LSU

2010 Lombardi Award Winner:

- Nick Fairley, Auburn

2010 Maxwell Award Winner:

- Cameron Newton, Auburn

2010 Walter Camp Award Winner:

- Cameron Newton, Auburn

2010 John Mackey Award Winner:

- DJ Williams, Arkansas

2010 Davey O'Brien Award Winner:

- Cameron Newton, Auburn

2010 Paul Hornung Award Finalist:

- Randall Cobb, Kentucky
