= 2010 NCAA Division I FBS football rankings =

- Season: 2010
- Bowl season: 2010–11 bowl games
- Preseason No. 1: Alabama
- End of season champions: Auburn
- Conference with most teams in final AP poll: SEC (6)

Three human polls and one formula ranking make up the 2010 NCAA Division I FBS (Football Bowl Subdivision) football rankings, in addition to various publications' preseason polls. Unlike most sports, college football's governing body, the NCAA, does not bestow a national championship title. That title is bestowed by one or more of four different polling agencies. There are two main weekly polls that begin in the preseason: the AP Poll and the Coaches Poll. Two additional polls are released midway through the season; the Harris Interactive Poll is released after the sixth week of the season and the Bowl Championship Series (BCS) standings is released after the seventh week. The Harris Poll and Coaches Poll are factors in the BCS standings. At the end of the season, on Sunday, December 5, 2010, the BCS standings determines who plays in the BCS bowl games as well as the 2011 BCS National Championship Game on January 10, 2011 at the University of Phoenix Stadium in Glendale, Arizona.

== Legend ==
	Increase in ranking
	Decrease in ranking
	Not ranked previous week
	Selected for BCS National Championship Game
(#–#)	Win–loss record
(Italics)	Number of first place votes
т	Tied with team above or below also with this symbol

== AP Poll ==
	Preseason Aug 21	Week 1 Sep 7	Week 2 Sep 12	Week 3 Sep 19	Week 4 Sep 26	Week 5 Oct 3	Week 6 Oct 10	Week 7 Oct 17	Week 8 Oct 24	Week 9 Oct 31	Week 10 Nov 7	Week 11 Nov 14	Week 12 Nov 21	Week 13 Nov 28	Week 14 Dec 5	Week 15 (Final) Jan 11	
1.	Alabama (54)	Alabama (1–0) (47)	Alabama (2–0) (52)	Alabama (3–0) (53)	Alabama (4–0) (57)	Alabama (5–0) (58)	Ohio State (6–0) (34)	Oregon (6–0) (39)	Oregon (7–0) (44)	Oregon (8–0) (49)	Oregon (9–0) (49)	Oregon (10–0) (38)	Oregon (10–0) (37)	Oregon (11–0) (36)	Auburn (13–0) (36)	Auburn (14–0) (56)	1.
2.	Ohio State (3)	Ohio State (1–0) (4)	Ohio State (2–0) (5)	Ohio State (3–0) (5)	Ohio State (4–0) (2)	Ohio State (5–0) (1)	Oregon (6–0) (15)	Boise State (6–0) (15)	Boise State (6–0) (11)	Boise State (7–0) (7)	Auburn (10–0) (2)	Auburn (11–0) (12)	Auburn (11–0) (13)	Auburn (12–0) (23)	Oregon (12–0) (23)	TCU (13–0) (3)	2.
3.	Boise State (1)	Boise State (1–0) (8)	Boise State (1–0) (1)	Boise State (2–0) (1)	Boise State (3–0) (1)	Oregon (5–0)	Boise State (5–0) (8)	Oklahoma (6–0) (3)	Auburn (8–0) (3)	Auburn (9–0) (2)	TCU (10–0) (2)	Boise State (9–0) (9)	Boise State (10–0) (10)	TCU (12–0) (1)	TCU (12–0) (1)	Oregon (12–1)	3.
4.	Florida	TCU (1–0)	TCU (2–0)	TCU (3–0)	Oregon (4–0)	Boise State (4–0) (1)	TCU (6–0) (1)	TCU (7–0) (3)	TCU (8–0) (2)	TCU (9–0) (2)	Boise State (8–0) (7)	TCU (11–0) (1)	TCU (11–0)	Wisconsin (11–1)	Wisconsin (11–1)	Stanford (12–1)	4.
5.	Texas (1)	Texas (1–0) (1)	Oregon (2–0)	Oregon (3–0)	TCU (4–0)	TCU (5–0)	Nebraska (5–0)	Auburn (7–0)	Michigan State (8–0)	Alabama (7–1)	LSU (8–1)	LSU (9–1)	Wisconsin (10–1)	Stanford (11–1)	Stanford (11–1)	Ohio State (12–1)	5.
6.	TCU	Nebraska (1–0)	Texas (2–0) (1)	Nebraska (3–0)	Nebraska (4–0)	Oklahoma (5–0)	Oklahoma (5–0) (2)	LSU (7–0)	Alabama (7–1)	Utah (8–0)	Wisconsin (8–1)	Wisconsin (9–1)	LSU (10–1)	Ohio State (11–1)	Ohio State (11–1)	Oklahoma (12–2)	6.
7.	Oklahoma (1)	Oregon (1–0)	Oklahoma (2–0)	Texas (3–0) (1)	Florida (4–0)	Nebraska (4–0)	Auburn (6–0)	Alabama (6–1)	Missouri (7–0)	Wisconsin (7–1)	Stanford (8–1)	Stanford (9–1)	Stanford (10–1)	Michigan State (11–1)	Michigan State (11–1)	Wisconsin (11–2)	7.
8.	Nebraska	Florida (1–0)	Nebraska (2–0)	Oklahoma (3–0)	Oklahoma (4–0)	Auburn (5–0)	Alabama (5–1)	Michigan State (7–0)	Utah (7–0)	Ohio State (8–1)	Ohio State (8–1)	Ohio State (9–1)	Ohio State (10–1)	Arkansas (10–2)	Arkansas (10–2)	LSU (11–2)	8.
9.	Iowa	Iowa (1–0)	Iowa (2–0)	Florida (3–0)	Stanford (4–0)	Arizona (4–0)	LSU (6–0)	Utah (6–0)	Wisconsin (7–1)	Nebraska (7–1)	Nebraska (8–1)	Nebraska (9–1)	Alabama (9–2)	Boise State (10–1)	Oklahoma (11–2)	Boise State (12–1)	9.
10.	Virginia Tech	Oklahoma (1–0)	Florida (2–0)	Arkansas (3–0)	Auburn (4–0)	Utah (4–0)	South Carolina (4–1)	Wisconsin (6–1)	Ohio State (7–1)	Stanford (7–1)	Michigan State (9–1)	Alabama (8–2)	Oklahoma State (10–1)	Oklahoma (10–2)	Boise State (11–1)	Alabama (10–3)	10.
11.	Oregon	Wisconsin (1–0)	Wisconsin (2–0)	Wisconsin (3–0)	Wisconsin (4–0)	Arkansas (3–1)	Utah (5–0)	Ohio State (6–1)	Oklahoma (6–1)	Oklahoma (7–1)	Alabama (7–2)	Michigan State (9–1)	Michigan State (10–1)	LSU (10–2)	LSU (10–2)	Nevada (13–1)	11.
12.	Wisconsin	Miami (FL) (1–0)	Arkansas (2–0)	South Carolina (3–0)	LSU (4–0)	LSU (5–0)	Arkansas (4–1)	Stanford (5–1)	LSU (7–1)	LSU (7–1)	Oklahoma State (8–1)	Oklahoma State (9–1)	Arkansas (9–2)	Virginia Tech (10–2)	Virginia Tech (11–2)	Arkansas (10–3)	12.
13.	Miami (FL)	Virginia Tech (0–1)	South Carolina (2–0)	Utah (3–0)	Utah (4–0)	Miami (FL) (3–1)	Michigan State (6–0)	Iowa (5–1)	Stanford (6–1)	Arizona (7–1)	Iowa (7–2)	Arkansas (8–2)	Virginia Tech (9–2)	Nebraska (10–2)	Nevada (12–1)	Oklahoma State (11–2)	13.
14.	USC	Arkansas (1–0)	Utah (2–0)	Arizona (3–0)	Arizona (4–0)	Florida (4–1)	Stanford (5–1)	Nebraska (5–1)	Nebraska (6–1)	Missouri (7–1)	Arkansas (7–2)	Virginia Tech (8–2)	Oklahoma (9–2)	Nevada (11–1)	Missouri (10–2)	Michigan State (11–2)	14.
15.	Pittsburgh	Georgia Tech (1–0)	LSU (2–0)	LSU (3–0)	Arkansas (3–1)	Iowa (4–1)	Iowa (4–1)	Arizona (5–1)	Arizona (6–1)	Iowa (6–2)	Utah (8–1)	Missouri (8–2)	Missouri (9–2)	Missouri (10–2)	Alabama (9–3)	Mississippi State (9–4)	15.
16.	Georgia Tech	USC (1–0)	Auburn (2–0)	Stanford (3–0)	Miami (FL) (2–1)	Stanford (4–1)	Florida State (5–1)	Florida State (6–1)	Florida State (6–1)	Michigan State (8–1)	Virginia Tech (7–2)	Oklahoma (8–2)	Nebraska (9–2)	Oklahoma State (10–2)	Oklahoma State (10–2)	Virginia Tech (11–3)	16.
17.	Arkansas	Florida State (1–0)	Miami (FL) (1–1)	Auburn (3–0)	Iowa (3–1)	Michigan State (5–0)	Arizona (4–1)	Oklahoma State (6–0)	South Carolina (5–2)	Arkansas (6–2)	Mississippi State (7–2)	South Carolina (7–3)	Texas A&M (8–3)	Alabama (9–3)	Nebraska (10–3)	Florida State (10–4)	17.
18.	North Carolina	Penn State (1–0)	USC (2–0)	Iowa (2–1)	USC (4–0)	Michigan (5–0)	Wisconsin (5–1)	Missouri (6–0)	Iowa (5–2)	South Carolina (6–2)	Arizona (7–2)	Texas A&M (7–3)	South Carolina (8–3)	South Carolina (9–3)	Texas A&M (9–3)	Missouri (10–3)	18.
19.	Penn State	LSU (1–0)	Stanford (2–0)	Miami (FL) (1–1)	Michigan (4–0)	South Carolina (3–1)	Nevada (6–0)	South Carolina (4–2)	Arkansas (5–2)	Oklahoma State (7–1)	Oklahoma (7–2)	Nevada (9–1)	Nevada (10–1)	Texas A&M (9–3)	South Carolina (9–4)	Texas A&M (9–4)	19.
20.	Florida State	Utah (1–0)	Michigan (2–0)	USC (3–0)	South Carolina (3–1)	Wisconsin (4–1)	Oklahoma State (5–0)	West Virginia (5–1)	Oklahoma State (6–1)	Virginia Tech (6–2)	Missouri (7–2)	USC (7–3)	Arizona (7–3)	Florida State (9–3)	Utah (10–2)	Nebraska (10–4)	20.
21.	LSU	Auburn (1–0)	West Virginia (2–0)	Michigan (3–0)	Texas (3–1)	Nevada (5–0)	Missouri (5–0)	Arkansas (4–2)	Virginia Tech (6–2)	Mississippi State (7–2)	Nevada (8–1)	Iowa (7–3)	NC State (8–3)	Utah (10–2)	Mississippi State (8–4)	UCF (11–3)	21.
22.	Auburn	Georgia (1–0)	Penn State (1–1)	West Virginia (3–0)	Penn State (3–1)	Oklahoma State (4–0)	Florida (4–2)	Texas (4–2)	Miami (FL) (5–2)	Baylor (7–2)	South Carolina (6–3)	Mississippi State (7–3)	Florida State (8–3)	Mississippi State (8–4)	West Virginia (9–3)	South Carolina (9–5)	22.
23.	Georgia	West Virginia (1–0)	Houston (2–0)	Penn State (2–1)	NC State (4–0)	Florida State (4–1)	Air Force (5–1)	Virginia Tech (5–2)	Mississippi State (6–2)	NC State (6–2)	Texas A&M (6–3)	Arizona (7–3)	Utah (9–2)	West Virginia (8–3)	Florida State (9–4)	Maryland (9–4)	23.
24.	Oregon State	South Carolina (1–0)	Arizona (2–0)	Oregon State (1–1)	Michigan State (4–0)	Missouri (4–0)	Oregon State (3–2)	Mississippi State (5–2)	USC (5–2)	Florida State (6–2)	Florida (6–3)	Miami (FL) (7–3)	Iowa (7–4)	Northern Illinois (10–2)	Hawaii (10–3)	Tulsa (10–3)	24.
25.	West Virginia	Stanford (1–0)	Oregon State (0–1)	Michigan State (3–0)	Nevada (4–0)	Air Force (4–1)	West Virginia (5–1)	Miami (FL) (4–2)	Baylor (6–2)	Nevada (7–1)	UCF (7–2)	Utah (8–2)	Mississippi State (7–4)	Hawaii (9–3)	Connecticut (8–4)	NC State (9–4)	25.
	Preseason Aug 21	Week 1 Sep 7	Week 2 Sep 12	Week 3 Sep 19	Week 4 Sep 26	Week 5 Oct 3	Week 6 Oct 10	Week 7 Oct 17	Week 8 Oct 24	Week 9 Oct 31	Week 10 Nov 7	Week 11 Nov 14	Week 12 Nov 21	Week 13 Nov 28	Week 14 Dec 5	Week 15 (Final) Jan 11	
		Dropped: Pittsburgh; North Carolina; Oregon State	Dropped: Virginia Tech; Georgia Tech; Florida State; Georgia	Dropped: Houston	Dropped: West Virginia; Oregon State	Dropped: USC; Texas; Penn State; NC State	Dropped: Miami (FL); Michigan	Dropped: Nevada; Florida; Air Force; Oregon State	Dropped: West Virginia; Texas	Dropped: Miami (FL); USC	Dropped: Baylor; NC State; Florida State	Dropped: Florida; UCF	Dropped: USC; Miami (FL)	Dropped: Arizona; NC State; Iowa	Dropped: Northern Illinois	Dropped: Utah; West Virginia; Hawaii; Connecticut	

== Coaches Poll ==
	Preseason Aug 6	Week 1 Sep 7	Week 2 Sep 12	Week 3 Sep 19	Week 4 Sep 26	Week 5 Oct 3	Week 6 Oct 10	Week 7 Oct 17	Week 8 Oct 24	Week 9 Oct 31	Week 10 Nov 7	Week 11 Nov 14	Week 12 Nov 21	Week 13 Nov 28	Week 14 Dec 5	Week 15 (Final) Jan 11	
1.	Alabama (55)	Alabama (1–0) (55)	Alabama (2–0) (55)	Alabama (3–0) (55)	Alabama (4–0) (57)	Alabama (5–0) (57)	Ohio State (6–0) (49)	Oregon (6–0) (42)	Oregon (7–0) (50)	Oregon (8–0) (51)	Oregon (9–0) (50)	Oregon (10–0) (46)	Oregon (10–0) (48)	Oregon (11–0) (46)	Oregon (12–0) (34)	Auburn (14–0) (56)	1.
2.	Ohio State (4)	Ohio State (1–0) (4)	Ohio State (2–0) (4)	Ohio State (3–0) (3)	Ohio State (4–0) (2)	Ohio State (5–0) (1)	Oregon (6–0) (6)	Boise State (6–0) (11)	Boise State (6–0) (5)	Auburn (9–0) (4)	Auburn (10–0) (4)	Auburn (11–0) (6)	Auburn (11–0) (4)	Auburn (12–0) (10)	Auburn (13–0) (24)	TCU (13–0) (1)	2.
3.	Florida	Boise State (1–0)	Boise State (1–0)	Boise State (2–0)	Boise State (3–0)	Oregon (5–0)	Boise State (5–0) (1)	Oklahoma (6–0) (4)	Auburn (8–0) (3)	Boise State (7–0) (3)	TCU (10–0) (2)	Boise State (9–0) (5)	Boise State (10–0) (5)	TCU (12–0) (3)	TCU (12–0) (1)	Oregon (12–1)	3.
4.	Texas	Texas (1–0)	Texas (2–0)	Texas (3–0)	Oregon (4–0)	Boise State (4–0)	Nebraska (5–0) (2)	TCU (7–0) (1)	TCU (8–0) (1)	TCU (9–0) (1)	Boise State (8–0) (3)	TCU (11–0) (2)	TCU (11–0) (2)	Wisconsin (11–1)	Wisconsin (11–1)	Stanford (12–1)	4.
5.	Boise State	TCU (1–0)	TCU (2–0)	TCU (3–0)	TCU (4–0)	TCU (5–0)	TCU (6–0) (1)	Auburn (7–0) (1)	Michigan State (8–0)	Alabama (7–1)	Wisconsin (8–1)	Wisconsin (9–1)	Wisconsin (10–1)	Stanford (11–1)	Stanford (11–1)	Ohio State (12–1)	5.
6.	Virginia Tech	Florida (1–0)	Oregon (2–0)	Oregon (3–0)	Nebraska (4–0)	Nebraska (4–0)	Oklahoma (5–0)	LSU (7–0)	Alabama (7–1)	Utah (8–0)	LSU (8–1)	LSU (9–1)	LSU (10–1)	Ohio State (11–1)	Ohio State (11–1)	Oklahoma (12–2)	6.
7.	TCU	Nebraska (1–0)	Florida (2–0)	Nebraska (3–0) (1)	Florida (4–0)	Oklahoma (5–0)	Auburn (6–0)	Alabama (6–1)	Utah (7–0)	Wisconsin (7–1)	Ohio State (8–1)	Ohio State (9–1)	Ohio State (10–1)	Michigan State (11–1)	Michigan State (11–1)	Boise State (12–1)	7.
8.	Oklahoma	Oregon (1–0)	Nebraska (2–0)	Florida (3–0)	Oklahoma (4–0)	Auburn (5–0)	Alabama (5–1)	Michigan State (7–0)	Missouri (7–0)	Ohio State (8–1)	Nebraska (8–1)	Stanford (9–1)	Stanford (10–1)	Arkansas (10–2)	Arkansas (10–2)	Wisconsin (11–2)	8.
9.	Nebraska	Iowa (1–0)	Oklahoma (2–0)	Oklahoma (3–0)	Wisconsin (4–0)	LSU (5–0)	LSU (6–0)	Utah (6–0)	Wisconsin (7–1)	Oklahoma (7–1)	Stanford (8–1)	Nebraska (9–1)	Oklahoma State (10–1)	Oklahoma (10–2)	Oklahoma (11–2)	LSU (11–2)	9.
10.	Iowa	Oklahoma (1–0)	Iowa (2–0)	Wisconsin (3–0)	LSU (4–0)	Utah (4–0)	Utah (5–0)	Ohio State (6–1)	Ohio State (7–1)	Nebraska (7–1)	Michigan State (9–1)	Oklahoma State (9–1)	Michigan State (10–1)	Boise State (10–1)	Boise State (11–1)	Oklahoma State (11–2)	10.
11.	Oregon	Wisconsin (1–0)	Wisconsin (2–0)	Arkansas (3–0)	Auburn (4–0)	Arizona (4–0)	Michigan State (6–0)	Wisconsin (6–1)	Oklahoma (6–1)	LSU (7–1)	Oklahoma State (8–1)	Michigan State (9–1)	Alabama (9–2)	Virginia Tech (10–2)	Virginia Tech (11–2)	Alabama (10–3)	11.
12.	Wisconsin	Miami (FL) (1–0)	LSU (2–0)	LSU (3–0)	Utah (4–0)	Florida (4–1)	South Carolina (4–1)	Iowa (5–1)	Nebraska (6–1)	Stanford (7–1)	Alabama (7–2)	Alabama (8–2)	Arkansas (9–2)	LSU (10–2)	LSU (10–2)	Arkansas (10–3)	12.
13.	Miami (FL)	Virginia Tech (0–1)	Arkansas (2–0)	Utah (3–0)	Stanford (4–0)	Arkansas (3–1)	Arkansas (4–1)	Nebraska (5–1)	LSU (7–1)	Arizona (7–1)	Iowa (7–2)	Arkansas (8–2)	Oklahoma (9–2)	Nebraska (10–2)	Oklahoma State (10–2)	Nevada (13–1)	13.
14.	Penn State	Penn State (1–0)	Utah (2–0)	Auburn (3–0)	Arizona (4–0)	Miami (FL) (3–1)	Iowa (4–1)	Stanford (5–1)	Stanford (6–1)	Missouri (7–1)	Arkansas (7–2)	Oklahoma (8–2)	Virginia Tech (9–2)	Missouri (10–2)	Missouri (10–2)	Michigan State (11–2)	14.
15.	Pittsburgh	Arkansas (1–0)	Auburn (2–0)	South Carolina (3–0)	Arkansas (3–1)	Iowa (4–1)	Stanford (5–1)	Oklahoma State (6–0)	Florida State (6–1)	Michigan State (8–1)	Utah (8–1)	Virginia Tech (8–2)	Nebraska (9–2)	Oklahoma State (10–2)	Nevada (12–1)	Virginia Tech (11–3)	15.
16.	LSU	LSU (1–0)	South Carolina (2–0)	Arizona (3–0)	Texas (3–1)	Michigan State (5–0)	Wisconsin (5–1)	Missouri (6–0)	Arizona (6–1)	Iowa (6–2)	Oklahoma (7–2)	Missouri (8–2)	Missouri (9–2)	South Carolina (9–3)	Nebraska (10–3)	Florida State (10–4)	16.
17.	Georgia Tech	Georgia Tech (1–0)	Miami (FL) (1–1)	Stanford (3–0)	Miami (FL) (2–1)	Michigan (5–0)	Florida State (5–1)	Florida State (6–1)	South Carolina (5–2)	South Carolina (6–2)	Virginia Tech (7–2)	South Carolina (7–3)	South Carolina (8–3)	Nevada (11–1)	Texas A&M (9–3)	Mississippi State (9–4)	17.
18.	North Carolina	Florida State (1–0)	Arizona (2–0)	Iowa (2–1)	Iowa (3–1)	Stanford (4–1)	Oklahoma State (5–0)	Arizona (5–1)	Arkansas (5–2)	Oklahoma State (7–1)	Mississippi State (7–2)	Nevada (9–1)	Texas A&M (8–3)	Texas A&M (9–3)	Alabama (9–3)	Missouri (10–3)	18.
19.	Arkansas	Georgia (1–0)	Stanford (2–0)	Miami (FL) (1–1)	Michigan (4–0)	Wisconsin (4–1)	Missouri (5–0)	West Virginia (5–1)	Iowa (5–2)	Arkansas (6–2)	Arizona (7–2)	Texas A&M (7–3)	Nevada (10–1)	Alabama (9–3)	Utah (10–2)	Nebraska (10–4)	19.
20.	Florida State	Utah (1–0)	Penn State (1–1)	Penn State (2–1)	Penn State (3–1)	South Carolina (3–1)	Arizona (4–1)	South Carolina (4–2)	Oklahoma State (6–1)	Virginia Tech (6–2)	Missouri (7–2)	Iowa (7–3)	Arizona (7–3)	Florida State (9–3)	South Carolina (9–4)	UCF (11–3)	20.
21.	Georgia	Auburn (1–0)	West Virginia (2–0)	West Virginia (3–0)	Michigan State (4–0)	Oklahoma State (4–0)	Nevada (6–0)	Arkansas (4–2)	Virginia Tech (6–2)	Mississippi State (7–2)	Nevada (8–1)	Miami (FL) (7–3)	Florida State (8–3)	Utah (10–2)	West Virginia (9–3)	Texas A&M (9–4)	21.
22.	Oregon State	West Virginia (1–0)	Michigan (2–0)	Michigan (3–0)	South Carolina (3–1)	Missouri (4–0)	Florida (4–2)	Texas (4–2)	Miami (FL) (5–2)	Baylor (7–2)	South Carolina (6–3)	Mississippi State (7–3)	Utah (9–2)	Mississippi State (8–4)	Mississippi State (8–4)	South Carolina (9–5)	22.
23.	Auburn	Arizona (1–0)	Houston (2–0)	Michigan State (3–0)	Missouri (4–0)	Nevada (5–0)	Air Force (5–1)	Virginia Tech (5–2)	Mississippi State (6–2)	Nevada (7–1)	UCF (7–2)	Arizona (7–3)	NC State (8–3)	Northern Illinois (10–2)	Florida State (9–4)	Utah (10–3)	23.
24.	Utah т	BYU (1–0)	California (2–0)	Missouri (3–0)	Oklahoma State (3–0)	Florida State (4–1)	Michigan (5–1)	Mississippi State (5–2)	Baylor (6–2)	Florida State (6–2)	Florida (6–3)	Utah (8–2)	Iowa (7–4)	West Virginia (8–3)	UCF (10–3)	Maryland (9–4)	24.
25.	West Virginia т	South Carolina (1–0)	Missouri (2–0)	Oklahoma State (3–0)	Nevada (4–0)	Northwestern (5–0)	West Virginia (4–1)	Miami (FL) (4–2)	Michigan (5–2)	NC State (6–2)	Texas A&M (6–3)	Northwestern (7–3)	Mississippi State (7–4)	UCF (9–3)	Hawaii (10–3)	NC State (9–4)	25.
	Preseason Aug 6	Week 1 Sep 7	Week 2 Sep 12	Week 3 Sep 19	Week 4 Sep 26	Week 5 Oct 3	Week 6 Oct 10	Week 7 Oct 17	Week 8 Oct 24	Week 9 Oct 31	Week 10 Nov 7	Week 11 Nov 14	Week 12 Nov 21	Week 13 Nov 28	Week 14 Dec 5	Week 15 (Final) Jan 11	
		Dropped: Pittsburgh; North Carolina; Oregon State	Dropped: Virginia Tech; Georgia Tech; Florida State; Georgia; BYU	Dropped: Houston; California	Dropped: West Virginia	Dropped: Texas; Penn State	Dropped: Miami (FL); Northwestern	Dropped: Nevada; Florida; Air Force; Michigan	Dropped: West Virginia; Texas	Dropped: Miami (FL); Michigan	Dropped: Baylor; Florida State; NC State	Dropped: UCF; Florida	Dropped: Miami (FL); Northwestern	Dropped: Arizona; NC State; Iowa	Dropped: Northern Illinois	Dropped: West Virginia; Hawaii	

== Harris Interactive Poll ==
	Week 6 Oct 10	Week 7 Oct 17	Week 8 Oct 24	Week 9 Oct 31	Week 10 Nov 7	Week 11 Nov 14	Week 12 Nov 21	Week 13 Nov 28	Week 14 (Final) Dec 5	
1.	Ohio State (6–0) (79)	Oregon (6–0) (77)	Oregon (7–0) (91)	Oregon (8–0) (92)	Oregon (9–0) (93)	Oregon (10–0) (65)	Oregon (10–0) (68)	Oregon (11–0) (70)	Auburn (13–0) (75)	1.
2.	Oregon (6–0) (23)	Boise State (6–0) (29)	Boise State (6–0) (14)	Auburn (9–0) (10)	Auburn (10–0) (7)	Auburn (11–0) (35)	Auburn (11–0) (31)	Auburn (12–0) (42)	Oregon (12–0) (38)	2.
3.	Boise State (5–0) (10)	TCU (7–0) (3)	Auburn (8–0) (6)	Boise State (7–0) (12)	TCU (10–0) (5)	Boise State (9–0) (11)	Boise State (10–0) (14)	TCU (12–0) (2)	TCU (12–0) (1)	3.
4.	TCU (6–0)	Oklahoma (6–0) (4)	TCU (8–0) (3)	TCU (9–0)	Boise State (8–0) (9)	TCU (11–0) (3)	TCU (11–0) (1)	Wisconsin (11–1)	Wisconsin (11–1)	4.
5.	Nebraska (5–0)	Auburn (7–0)	Michigan State (8–0)	Alabama (7–1)	Wisconsin (8–1)	Wisconsin (9–1)	Wisconsin (10–1)	Stanford (11–1)	Stanford (11–1)	5.
6.	Oklahoma (5–0) (2)	LSU (7–0)	Alabama (7–1)	Utah (8–0)	LSU (8–1)	LSU (9–1)	LSU (10–1)	Ohio State (11–1)	Ohio State (11–1)	6.
7.	Auburn (6–0)	Alabama (6–1)	Utah (7–0)	Wisconsin (7–1)	Ohio State (8–1)	Ohio State (9–1)	Stanford (10–1)	Michigan State (11–1)	Michigan State (11–1)	7.
8.	Alabama (5–1)	Michigan State (7–0)	Missouri (7–0)	Ohio State (8–1)	Stanford (8–1)	Stanford (9–1)	Ohio State (10–1)	Arkansas (10–2)	Arkansas (10–2)	8.
9.	LSU (6–0)	Utah (6–0)	Wisconsin (7–1)	Oklahoma (7–1)	Nebraska (8–1)	Nebraska (9–1)	Oklahoma State (10–1)	Oklahoma (10–2)	Oklahoma (11–2)	9.
10.	Utah (5–0)	Ohio State (6–1)	Ohio State (7–1)	Stanford (7–1)	Michigan State (9–1)	Michigan State (9–1)	Michigan State (10–1)	Boise State (10–1)	Boise State (11–1)	10.
11.	South Carolina (4–1)	Wisconsin (6–1)	Oklahoma (6–1)	Nebraska (7–1)	Alabama (7–2)	Alabama (8–2)	Alabama (9–2)	LSU (10–2)	LSU (10–2)	11.
12.	Michigan State (6–0)	Iowa (5–1)	LSU (7–1)	LSU (7–1)	Iowa (7–2)	Oklahoma State (9–1)	Arkansas (9–2)	Virginia Tech (10–2)	Virginia Tech (11–2)	12.
13.	Arkansas (4–1)	Stanford (5–1)	Stanford (6–1)	Arizona (7–1)	Oklahoma State (8–1)	Arkansas (8–2)	Oklahoma (9–2)	Nebraska (10–2)	Missouri (10–2)	13.
14.	Stanford (5–1)	Nebraska (5–1)	Nebraska (6–1)	Iowa (6–2)	Arkansas (7–2)	Oklahoma (8–2)	Virginia Tech (9–2)	Missouri (10–2)	Nevada (12–1)	14.
15.	Iowa (4–1)	Oklahoma State (6–0)	Arizona (6–1)	Missouri (7–1)	Utah (8–1)	Virginia Tech (8–2)	Nebraska (9–2)	Nevada (11–1)	Oklahoma State (10–2)	15.
16.	Wisconsin (5–1)	Missouri (6–0)	Florida State (6–1)	Michigan State (8–1)	Oklahoma (7–2)	Missouri (8–2)	Missouri (9–2)	Oklahoma State (10–2)	Alabama (9–3)	16.
17.	Florida State (5–1)	Florida State (6–1)	Iowa (5–2)	Arkansas (6–2)	Virginia Tech (7–2)	South Carolina (7–3)	South Carolina (8–3)	South Carolina (9–3)	Nebraska (10–3)	17.
18.	Oklahoma State (5–0)	Arizona (5–1)	Arkansas (5–2)	Oklahoma State (7–1)	Mississippi State (7–2)	Nevada (9–1)	Texas A&M (8–3)	Alabama (9–3)	Texas A&M (9–3)	18.
19.	Missouri (5–0)	West Virginia (5–1)	South Carolina (5–2)	South Carolina (6–2)	Arizona (7–2)	Iowa (7–3)	Nevada (10–1)	Texas A&M (9–3)	Utah (10–2)	19.
20.	Nevada (6–0)	Arkansas (4–2)	Oklahoma State (6–1)	Virginia Tech (6–2)	Missouri (7–2)	Texas A&M (7–3)	Utah (9–2)	Florida State (9–3)	South Carolina (9–4)	20.
21.	Arizona (4–1)	South Carolina (4–2)	Virginia Tech (6–2)	Mississippi State (7–2)	Nevada (8–1)	Utah (8–2)	Arizona (7–3)	Utah (10–2)	West Virginia (9–3)	21.
22.	Florida (4–2)	Texas (4–2)	Miami (FL) (5–2)	Baylor (7–2)	South Carolina (6–3)	Mississippi State (7–3)	Florida State (8–3)	Mississippi State (8–4)	Mississippi State (8–4)	22.
23.	Air Force (5–1)	Virginia Tech (4–2)	Mississippi State (6–2)	Nevada (7–1)	Florida (6–3)	Arizona (7–3)	NC State (8–3)	West Virginia (8–3)	Florida State (9–4)	23.
24.	Michigan (5–1)	Miami (FL) (4–2)	Nevada (6–1)	Florida State (6–2)	Texas A&M (6–3)	Miami (FL) (7–3)	Iowa (7–4)	Northern Illinois (10–2)	Hawaii (10–3)	24.
25.	West Virginia (4–1)	Kansas State (5–1) т; Nevada (6–1) т	Baylor (6–2)	NC State (6–2)	UCF (7–2)	Florida State (7–3)	Mississippi State (7–4)	Arizona (7–4)	UCF (10–3)	25.
	Week 6 Oct 10	Week 7 Oct 17	Week 8 Oct 24	Week 9 Oct 31	Week 10 Nov 7	Week 11 Nov 14	Week 12 Nov 21	Week 13 Nov 28	Week 14 (Final) Dec 5	
		Dropped: Florida; Air Force; Michigan	Dropped: West Virginia; Texas; Kansas State	Dropped: Miami (FL)	Dropped: Baylor; Florida State; NC State	Dropped: Florida; UCF	Dropped: Miami (FL)	Dropped: NC State; Iowa	Dropped: Northern Illinois; Arizona	

== BCS standings ==
	Week 7 Oct 17	Week 8 Oct 24	Week 9 Oct 31	Week 10 Nov 7	Week 11 Nov 14	Week 12 Nov 21	Week 13 Nov 28	Week 14 (Final) Dec 5	
1.	Oklahoma (6–0)	Auburn (8–0)	Oregon (8–0)	Oregon (9–0)	Oregon (10–0)	Oregon (10–0)	Auburn (12–0)	Auburn (13–0)	1.
2.	Oregon (6–0)	Oregon (7–0)	Auburn (9–0)	Auburn (10–0)	Auburn (11–0)	Auburn (11–0)	Oregon (11–0)	Oregon (12–0)	2.
3.	Boise State (6–0)	Boise State (6–0)	TCU (9–0)	TCU (10–0)	TCU (11–0)	TCU (11–0)	TCU (12–0)	TCU (12–0)	3.
4.	Auburn (7–0)	TCU (8–0)	Boise State (7–0)	Boise State (8–0)	Boise State (9–0)	Boise State (10–0)	Stanford (11–1)	Stanford (11–1)	4.
5.	TCU (7–0)	Michigan State (8–0)	Utah (8–0)	LSU (8–1)	LSU (9–1)	LSU (10–1)	Wisconsin (11–1)	Wisconsin (11–1)	5.
6.	LSU (7–0)	Missouri (7–0)	Alabama (7–1)	Stanford (8–1)	Stanford (9–1)	Stanford (10–1)	Ohio State (11–1)	Ohio State (11–1)	6.
7.	Michigan State (7–0)	Alabama (7–1)	Nebraska (7–1)	Wisconsin (8–1)	Wisconsin (9–1)	Wisconsin (10–1)	Arkansas (10–2)	Oklahoma (11–2)	7.
8.	Alabama (6–1)	Utah (7–0)	Oklahoma (7–1)	Nebraska (8–1)	Nebraska (9–1)	Ohio State (10–1)	Michigan State (11–1)	Arkansas (10–2)	8.
9.	Utah (6–0)	Oklahoma (6–1)	Wisconsin (7–1)	Ohio State (8–1)	Ohio State (9–1)	Oklahoma State (10–1)	Oklahoma (10–2)	Michigan State (11–1)	9.
10.	Ohio State (6–1)	Wisconsin (7–1)	LSU (7–1)	Oklahoma State (8–1)	Oklahoma State (9–1)	Michigan State (10–1)	LSU (10–2)	Boise State (11–1)	10.
11.	Missouri (6–0)	Ohio State (7–1)	Ohio State (8–1)	Michigan State (9–1)	Alabama (8–2)	Alabama (9–2)	Boise State (10–1)	LSU (10–2)	11.
12.	Stanford (5–1)	LSU (7–1)	Missouri (7–1)	Alabama (7–2)	Michigan State (9–1)	Arkansas (9–2)	Missouri (10–2)	Missouri (10–2)	12.
13.	Wisconsin (6–1)	Stanford (6–1)	Stanford (7–1)	Iowa (7–2)	Arkansas (8–2)	Oklahoma (9–2)	Nebraska (10–2)	Virginia Tech (11–2)	13.
14.	Oklahoma State (6–0)	Nebraska (6–1)	Michigan State (8–1)	Utah (8–1)	Oklahoma (8–2)	Missouri (9–2)	Oklahoma State (10–2)	Oklahoma State (10–2)	14.
15.	Iowa (5–1)	Arizona (6–1)	Arizona (7–1)	Arkansas (7–2)	Missouri (8–2)	Nebraska (9–2)	Virginia Tech (10–2)	Nevada (12–1)	15.
16.	Nebraska (5–1)	Florida State (6–1)	Iowa (6–2)	Oklahoma (7–2)	Virginia Tech (8–2)	Virginia Tech (9–2)	Alabama (9–3)	Alabama (9–3)	16.
17.	Florida State (6–1)	Oklahoma State (6–1)	Oklahoma State (7–1)	Missouri (7–2)	South Carolina (7–3)	Texas A&M (8–3)	Nevada (11–1)	Texas A&M (9–3)	17.
18.	Arizona (5–1)	Iowa (5–2)	Arkansas (6–2)	Arizona (7–2)	Nevada (9–1)	South Carolina (8–3)	Texas A&M (9–3)	Nebraska (10–3)	18.
19.	Texas (4–2)	Arkansas (5–2)	South Carolina (6–2)	Mississippi State (7–2)	Texas A&M (7–3)	Nevada (10–1)	South Carolina (9–3)	Utah (10–2)	19.
20.	West Virginia (5–1)	South Carolina (5–2)	Mississippi State (7–2)	Virginia Tech (7–2)	Iowa (7–3)	Utah (9–2)	Utah (10–2)	South Carolina (9–4)	20.
21.	South Carolina (4–2)	Mississippi State (6–2)	Baylor (7–2)	Nevada (8–1)	Mississippi State (7–3)	Arizona (7–3)	Florida State (9–3)	Mississippi State (8–4)	21.
22.	Kansas State (5–1)	Miami (FL) (5–2)	Virginia Tech (6–2)	Florida (6–3)	Arizona (7–3)	Florida State (8–3)	Mississippi State (8–4)	West Virginia (9–3)	22.
23.	Arkansas (4–2)	Virginia Tech (6–2)	Nevada (7–1)	South Carolina (6–3)	Utah (8–2)	NC State (8–3)	Arizona (7–4)	Florida State (9–4)	23.
24.	Mississippi State (5–2)	Nevada (6–1)	Florida State (6–2)	Kansas State (6–3)	Miami (FL) (7–3)	Iowa (7–4)	West Virginia (8–3)	Hawaii (10–3)	24.
25.	Virginia Tech (4–2)	Baylor (6–2)	NC State (6–2)	Texas A&M (6–3)	Florida State (7–3)	Mississippi State (7–4)	Northern Illinois (10–2)	UCF (10–3)	25.
	Week 7 Oct 17	Week 8 Oct 24	Week 9 Oct 31	Week 10 Nov 7	Week 11 Nov 14	Week 12 Nov 21	Week 13 Nov 28	Week 14 (Final) Dec 5	
		Dropped: Texas; West Virginia; Kansas State	Dropped: Miami (FL)	Dropped: Baylor; Florida State; NC State	Dropped: Florida; Kansas State	Dropped: Miami (FL)	Dropped: NC State; Iowa	Dropped: Northern Illinois; Arizona	
