= 2010 Texas A&M Aggies football team =

American college football season

2010 Texas A&M Aggies football

Big 12 South Division co-champion

Cotton Bowl Classic, L 24–41 vs. LSU
- Conference: Big 12 Conference
- South Division

Ranking
- Coaches: No. 21
- AP: No. 19
- Record: 9–4 (6–2 Big 12)
- Head coach: Mike Sherman (3rd season)
- Offensive scheme: Multiple pro-style
- Defensive coordinator: Tim DeRuyter (1st season)
- Base defense: 3–4
- Captain: Jerrod Johnson
- Home stadium: Kyle Field

2010 Big 12 Conference football standings
	Conf.			Overall
Team	W		L	W		L
North Division
No. 20 Nebraska xy	6	–	2	10	–	4
No. 18 Missouri x	6	–	2	10	–	3
Kansas State	3	–	5	7	–	6
Iowa State	3	–	5	5	–	7
Colorado	2	–	6	5	–	7
Kansas	1	–	7	3	–	9
South Division
No. 6 Oklahoma xy$	6	–	2	12	–	2
No. 13 Oklahoma State x	6	–	2	11	–	2
No. 19 Texas A&M x	6	–	2	9	–	4
Baylor	4	–	4	7	–	6
Texas Tech	3	–	5	8	–	5
Texas	2	–	6	5	–	7
Championship: Oklahoma 23, Nebraska 20
$ – BCS representative as conference champion; x – Division champion/co-champions; y – Championship game participant; Rankings from AP Poll

The 2010 Texas A&M Aggies football team (often referred to as "A&M" or the "Aggies") represented Texas A&M University in the 2010 NCAA Division I FBS football season. The team was led by third-year head coach Mike Sherman and played their home games at Kyle Field in College Station, Texas. The team's defense was led by first-year coach Tim DeRuyter. They were members of the South Division of the Big 12 Conference.

The Aggies finished the season 9–4, 6–2 in Big 12 play and were South Division champions with Oklahoma and Oklahoma State. They were invited to the Cotton Bowl Classic where they were defeated by LSU, 24–41.

== Schedule ==
Date	Time	Opponent	Rank	Site	TV	Result	Attendance	Source
September 4	6:00 pm	No. 8 (FCS) Stephen F. Austin*		Kyle Field; College Station, TX		W 48–7	81,287	
September 11	6:00 pm	Louisiana Tech*		Kyle Field; College Station, TX		W 48–16	77,579	
September 18	6:00 pm	FIU*		Kyle Field; College Station, TX		W 27–20	79,069	
September 30	6:30 pm	at Oklahoma State		Boone Pickens Stadium; Stillwater, OK	ESPN	L 35–38	48,284	
October 9	2:30 pm	vs. No. 11 Arkansas*		Cowboys Stadium; Arlington, TX (Southwest Classic)	ABC	L 17–24	65,622	
October 16	11:00 am	No. 21 Missouri		Kyle Field; College Station, TX	FSN	L 9–30	83,453	
October 23	6:00 pm	at Kansas		Memorial Stadium; Lawrence, KS	FSN	W 45–10	44,239	
October 30	2:30 pm	Texas Tech		Kyle Field; College Station, TX (rivalry)		W 45–27	84,479	
November 6	6:00 pm	No. 11 Oklahoma		Kyle Field; College Station, TX	FSN	W 33–19	81,392	
November 13	6:00 pm	at Baylor	No. 23	Floyd Casey Stadium; Waco, TX (Battle of the Brazos)	FSN	W 42–30	45,089	
November 20	7:00 pm	No. 9 Nebraska	No. 18	Kyle Field; College Station, TX	ABC	W 9–6	90,079	
November 25	7:00 pm	at Texas	No. 17	Darrell K Royal–Texas Memorial Stadium; Austin, TX (rivalry)	ESPN	W 24–17	100,752	
January 7, 2011	7:27 pm	vs. No. 11 LSU*	No. 18	Cowboys Stadium; Arlington, TX (Cotton Bowl Classic, rivalry)	FOX	L 24–41	83,514	
*Non-conference game; Rankings from AP Poll released prior to the game; All times are in Central time

== Personnel ==
=== Roster ===
2010 Texas A&M Aggies football team roster
Players
Coaches
Offense

Pos.	#	Name	Class
QB	1	Jerrod Johnson	Sr
QB	3	Jameill Showers	Fr
WR	4	Brandal Jackson	So
WR	5	Kenric McNeal	So
QB	6	Luke Woodley	Fr
WR	7	Uzoma Nwachukwu	So
WR	8	Jeff Fuller	Jr
WR	9	Nate Askew	Fr
WR	10	Cody Beyer	Sr
TE	13	Tommy Dorman	So
WR	14	Keon Furtch	So
WR	15	Kenny Brown	Sr
WR	16	LeKendrick Williams	Fr
QB	16	Matt Joeckel	Fr
QB	17	Ryan Tannehill	Jr
QB	18	Patrick O'Quinn	Fr
TE	19	Winston Gamso	So
RB	20	Bradley Stephens	Jr
TE	21	Michael Lamothe	So
RB	23	Ben Malena	Fr
WR	24	Taylor Randle	Jr
WR	25	Ryan Swope (C)	So
RB	27	Mister Jones	Fr
RB	29	Anthony Vela	Sr
TE	30	Don Bishop	Fr
RB	32	Cyrus Gray	Jr
RB	33	Christine Michael	So
RB	34	Jay Tolliver	So
WR	35	Lee Rodgers	Fr
FB	37	Garrett Graham	Jr
TE	45	Matt Sherman	So
OL	51	Jarvis Harrison	Fr
OL	55	Chase Dube	Fr
OL	61	Patrick Lewis	So
OL	62	Jeffrey Hyde	Fr
OL	63	Cedric Ogbuehi	Fr
OL	65	Evan Eike	Jr
OL	67	Joseph Villavisencio	Jr
OL	70	Matt Allen	Sr
OL	71	Brian Thomas	So
OL	72	Josh Ayers	So
OL	73	Rhontae Scales	Fr
OL	74	Danny Baker	Jr
OL	75	Jake Matthews	Fr
OL	76	Luke Joeckel	Fr
OL	77	Shep Klinke	Fr
OL	78	Garrett Gramling	Fr
OL	79	Joseph Cheek	Fr
TE	8o	Hutson Prioleau	Fr
TE	81	Nehemiah Hicks	Fr
WR	82	David Adame	So
WR	83	Michael Walker	Fr
WR	84	Malcome Kennedy	Fr
WR	86	Seth Gardner	So
TE	87	Nehemiah Hicks	Fr
WR	88	Gaston Lamascus	Fr
TE	90	Justin Breshears	Fr
TE	96	Caden Smith	Fr

Defense

Pos.	#	Name	Class
DB	1	Trent Hunter	Jr
DB	2	Steven Campbell	So
DB	3	Lionel Smith	Jr
DB	4	Toney Hurd Jr.	Fr
DB	5	Coryell Judie	Jr
DL	6	K.J. Williams	Jr
DB	7	Terrence Frederick	Jr
LB	8	Garrick Williams	Jr
DB	9	Charlie Thomas	Fr
LB	10	Sean Porter	So
LB	11	Jonathan Stewart	So
DB	13	Desmond Gardiner	Fr
DB	14	Clay Honeycutt	Fr
DB	17	Chris Caflisch	Sr
DL	19	Eddie Brown, Jr.	Jr
DB	21	Steven Terrell (C)	So
DB	22	Dustin Harris	Fr
LB	23	Domonique Patterson	Fr
LB	24	Malcolm Johnson	Fr
DB	28	Louie Swope	Fr
DB	29	Blaine Cheatham	So
LB	35	Ricky Cavanaugh	Jr
LB	37	Michael Hodges	Sr
LB	38	Kolten Thigpen	Jr
LB	40	Von Miller	Sr
DL	41	Connor Fields	Fr
DB	41	Demaurier Thompson	Sr
DL	42	Kirby Ennis	Fr
DL	44	Andrew Wolridge	So
LB	47	Caleb Russell	So
LB	48	Andrew Weaver	Fr
DL	49	Brandon Jackson	Fr
DL	72	Gavin Stansbury	Fr
DL	77	Lucas Patterson	Sr
DL	83	Tony Jerod-Eddie	Jr
DL	89	Ivan Robinson	Fr
DL	90	Ben Bass	Jr
DL	91	Rob Rhodeback	Fr
DL	92	Jonathan Mathis	Jr
DL	93	Jomo McDuff	Fr
JKR	94	Damontre Moore	Fr
DL	96	Michael Ebbitt	Jr
DL	97	Cody Williams	Sr
DL	99	Spencer Nealy	So

Special teams

Pos.	#	Name	Class
P	26	Ken Wood	Jr
PK	28	Randy Bullock	Jr
PK	31	Kyle Serres	Fr
P	36	Jared Jaroszewski	Jr
PK	47	Logan Ortiz	Jr
P	48	Ryan Epperson	So
DS	53	Justin Ortega	Fr
DS	95	Ben Bredthauer	So

Head coach

- Mike Sherman (3rd season)

Coordinators/assistant coaches

- Tom Rossley – Quarterbacks
- Randy Jordan – Running backs
- Troy Walters – Wide receivers
- Jim Turner – Offensive line Coach
- Tim Deruyter – Defensive coordinator/Assistant Head Coach
- Terrell Williams – Defensive line Coach
- Charles McMillan – Defensive backs
- Dat Nguyen – Inside linebackers
- Nick Toth – Outside linebackers
- Dave Kennedy – Strength and conditioning

Legend

- (C) Team captain
- (S) Suspended
- (I) Ineligible
- Injured
- Redshirt

=== Notable players ===
Player (Position)	Records broken	Honors received
Jeff Fuller (WR)	• Season touchdowns • Career touchdowns • Number of games with at least one catch	• First team All-Big 12
Cyrus Gray (RB)	• Career-high of 223 yards in Texas game • First Aggie RB since Leeland McElroy in 1995 to reach 200 yards • First Aggie since Courtney Lewis in 2003 to rush for 1,000 yards. • Ran longest play from scrimmage and scored	• Big 12 Offensive Player of the Week (Texas) • Honorable mention All-Big 12
Michael Hodges (LB)	• Career-high of 19 tackles against Oklahoma	• 2× Big 12 Defensive Player of the Week (Oklahoma, Nebraska) • FWAA/Bronko Nagurski National Defensive Player of the Week (Oklahoma) • Honorable mention All-Big 12
Coryell Judie (KR/DB)	• First Aggie in school history to return kickoffs for touchdowns in consecutive games	• 2× Big 12 Special Teams Player (Oklahoma, Baylor) • Second team All-Big 12
Von Miller (LB)	• N/A	• 2× Big 12 Defensive Player of the Week (Baylor, Texas) • Walter Camp National Defensive Player of the Week (Texas) • First team All-Big 12 selection • 2010 Butkus Award winner for Nation's top collegiate linebacker

- Trent Hunter, DB, Walter Camp Defensive Player of the Week (Nebraska); Honorable mention All-Big 12
- Jerrod Johnson, QB, was the starter for the first seven games. He broke school records for career passing yards, single game completions, and career total offense.
- Christine Michael, RB, season cut short due to injury during Texas Tech game
- Ryan Swope, WR, broke season catch record; honorable mention All-Big 12
- Ryan Tannehill, QB, was the starting quarterback since the Texas Tech game, in which he broke the single game passing record. He played wide receiver earlier in the season. All-Big 12 Honorable mention.
- Patrick Lewis, OL, plays for the Seahawks in 2015
- Other All-Big 12 coach's selections include Matt Allen (second team OL). Total honorable mention selections is 22.

=== Coaching staff ===
Name	Position	Alma mater (Year)	Year at A&M
Mike Sherman	Head coach	Central Connecticut State (1978)	3rd
Tom Rossley	Quarterbacks	Cincinnati (1969)	3rd
Randy Jordan	Running backs	North Carolina (1993)	3rd
Jim Turner	Offensive line	Boston College (1988)	3rd
Troy Walters	Wide receivers	Stanford (2000)	1st
Tim DeRuyter	Defensive coordinator Assistant head coach	Air Force (1985)	1st
Terrell Williams	Defensive line	East Carolina (1998)	1st
Dat Nguyen	Inside linebackers	Texas A&M (1998)	1st
Nick Toth	Outside linebackers	Ohio (1999)	1st
Charles McMillian	Defensive backs	Utah State (1995)	3rd
Dave Kennedy	Strength and conditioning	Nebraska (1985)	3rd

== Game summaries ==
=== Stephen F. Austin ===
	1	2	3	4	Total
SFA	0	7	0	0	7
Texas A&M	7	13	21	7	48

=== Louisiana Tech ===
	1	2	3	4	Total
LA Tech	3	7	6	0	16
Texas A&M	7	14	17	10	48

=== Florida International ===
	1	2	3	4	Total
FIU	3	3	14	0	20
Texas A&M	0	6	0	21	27

=== Oklahoma State ===
	1	2	3	4	Total
Texas A&M	14	7	0	14	35
Oklahoma State	0	7	21	10	38

=== Arkansas ===
	1	2	3	4	Total
Arkansas	14	7	3	0	24
Texas A&M	7	7	3	0	17

=== Missouri ===
	1	2	3	4	Total
Missouri	6	10	14	0	30
Texas A&M	0	0	3	6	9

=== Kansas ===
	1	2	3	4	Total
Texas A&M	14	17	7	7	45
Kansas	3	7	0	0	10

Jerrod Johnson and Ryan Tannehill split time at quarterback for the first time.

=== Texas Tech ===
	1	2	3	4	Total
Texas Tech	7	7	0	13	27
Texas A&M	3	21	14	7	45

Ryan Tannehill's first career start. Johnson benched.

=== Oklahoma ===
	1	2	3	4	Total
Oklahoma	0	0	17	2	19
Texas A&M	9	3	7	14	33

Texas A&M defeated Oklahoma for the first time since 2002. Also the first time A&M beat a ranked opponent at home since 2007 Texas. It was an upset victory that included 3 goal-line stands by the A&M defense. OU ran 15 plays under the Aggie 10-yard line, and gained only 11 yards. Michael Hodges was part of the 3 goal-line stands. He earned Big 12 Defensive Player of the Week honors for his career-high 19 tackles. A&M also became ranked after the game, for the first time since September 21, 2007.

Oklahoma's loss was historically significant. OU ran the most plays (104) in its history, beating the previous record of 102. In games in which the Sooners ran more than 90 plays, the Sooners had been 39–0. The Sooners also had only 29 first downs; OU was 57–0 before the game, in which it made at least 29 first downs.

=== Baylor ===
	1	2	3	4	Total
Texas A&M	7	14	14	7	42
Baylor	17	13	0	0	30

Cyrus Gray picked up 137 rushing yards for a career-high of 4 touchdowns.

=== Nebraska ===
	1	2	3	4	Total
Nebraska	3	0	0	3	6
Texas A&M	0	3	0	6	9

Record-setting crowd of 90,079. Cyrus Gray's fifth consecutive 100-yard rushing game (Darren Lewis 1990). Trent Hunter had 2 interceptions. Nebraska was charged with a school-record 16 penalties for a total of 145 yards, and Texas A&M only had 2 penalties for 10 yards. No touchdowns were scored for either team, and all of the points were scored by way of field goals. Taylor Martinez re-injured his right ankle in the first quarter when he was stepped on by one of his offensive linemen.

Questionable roughing the passer call against Nebraska. Bo Pelini's behavior during the game was called into question.

Aggies won Tostitos Fiesta Bowl National Team of the Week.

=== Texas ===
	1	2	3	4	Total
Texas A&M	0	7	17	0	24
Texas	7	0	7	3	17

Cyrus Gray had a 200-yard game, first A&M RB since Leeland McElroy 1995. This game pushed Cyrus Gray over the 1,000 yard rushing mark for the 2010 season. Texas finished with its first losing season since 1997. With the win, the Aggies won a share of the Big 12 South Division title.

=== LSU – Cotton Bowl Classic ===
	1	2	3	4	Total
#11 Tigers	7	21	7	6	41
#18 Aggies	10	7	0	7	24

== NFL draft ==
1st Round, 2nd Overall Pick by the Denver Broncos—Sr. LB Von Miller.
