= 2011 Cotton Bowl Classic =

2011 AT&T Cotton Bowl Classic
- 75th Cotton Bowl Classic
LSU Tigers	Texas A&M Aggies
(10–2)	(9–3)
SEC	Big 12
41	24
Head coach: Les Miles	Head coach: Mike Sherman
AP / Coaches / BCS; 11 / 12 / 11	AP / Coaches / BCS; 18 / 17 / 17
	1	2	3	4	Total
LSU	7	21	7	6	41
Texas A&M	10	7	0	7	24
- Date: January 7, 2011
- Season: 2010
- Stadium: Cowboys Stadium
- Location: Arlington, Texas
- MVP: DB Tyrann Mathieu (LSU); WR Terrence Toliver (LSU)
- Favorite: LSU by 1, Over/Under: 49
- Referee: Randy Smith (C-USA)
- Attendance: 83,514
- Payout: US$7.15 million total ($3.75 million to A&M; $3.4 million to LSU)

United States TV coverage
- Network: Fox
- Announcers: Kenny Albert and Daryl Johnston

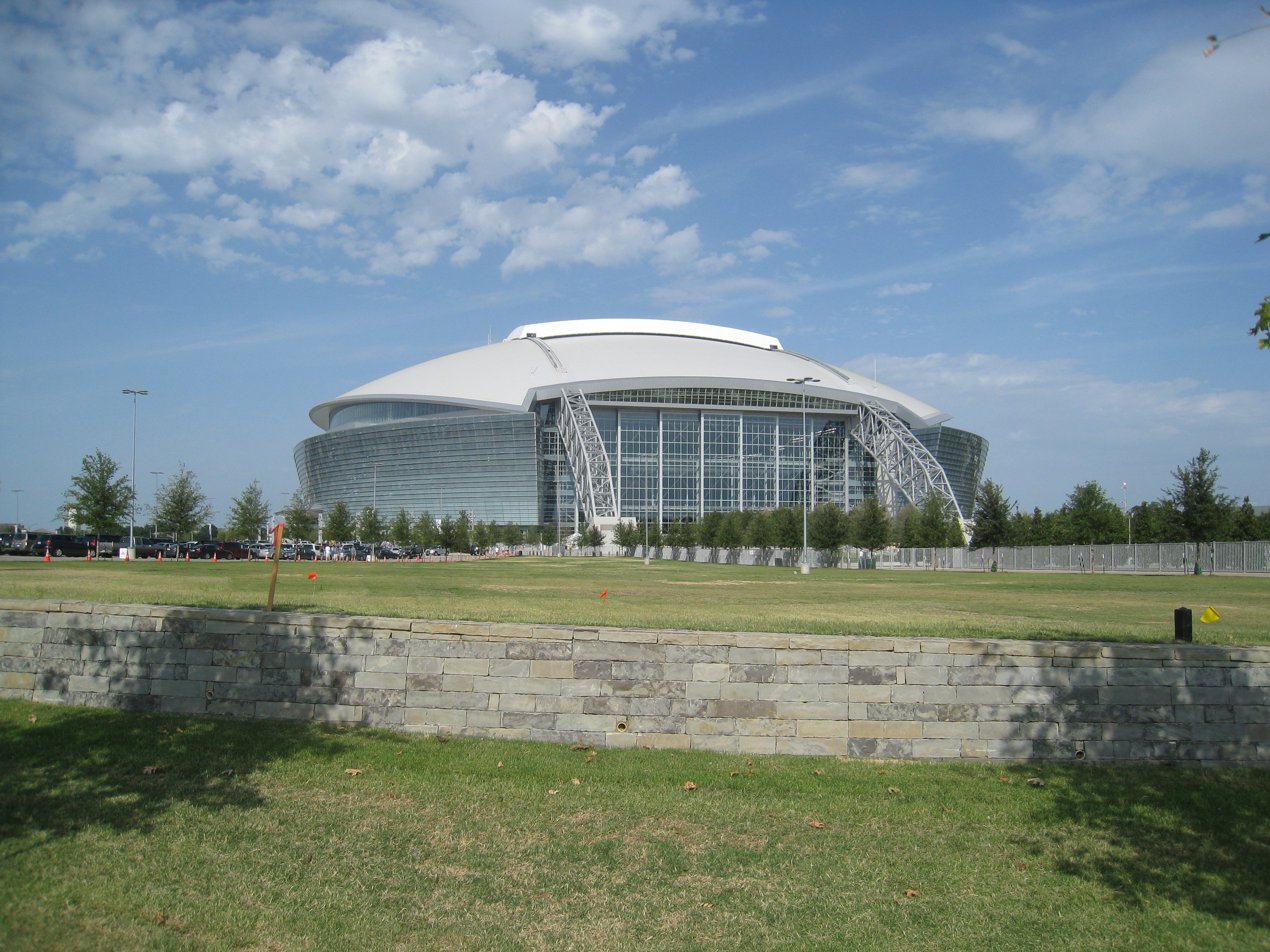
Cowboys Stadium in Arlington, Texas, hosted the Cotton Bowl Classic.

The 2011 AT&T Cotton Bowl Classic was the 75th edition of the annual post-season college football bowl game that was part of the 2010–11 bowl season of the 2010 NCAA Division I FBS football season. The game featured the LSU Tigers of the Southeastern Conference who defeated the Texas A&M Aggies of the Big 12 Conference by a score of 41–24. The game was scheduled for January 7, 2011 at 7:27 p.m. CST and was held at Cowboys Stadium in Arlington, Texas. This was the second time it was held in Cowboys Stadium after leaving its namesake venue. The game was broadcast by Fox.

== Teams ==
The meeting between the Tigers and the Aggies was the 50th all-time between the teams, but the first since the 1995 season. It was the second time LSU and Texas A&M squared off in a bowl game, the first being the 1944 Orange Bowl.

=== LSU ===
It was the fifth Cotton Bowl Classic appearance for the Tigers and the first since the 2002 season. The Tigers are the conference statistics leader on pass defense (165.83 ypg). They are rated second in pass efficiency defense (112.94 rating), kickoff returns (25.79 avg.), punt returns (13.50 avg.), scoring defense (17.75 ppg), and total defense (301.67 ypg). Senior Josh Jasper has kicked 31 of 32 point-after-touchdowns, and 26 of 31 field goals for a total of 109 points.

=== Texas A&M ===
Texas A&M finished the 2010 season 9–3 after starting the season 3–3 and winning their final 6 games. Led by 3rd year head coach Mike Sherman and 1st year defensive coordinator/assistant head coach Tim DeRuyter, the team finished the season by beating 2 top 10 teams, Oklahoma and Nebraska, as well as in state rivals Baylor and Texas. The Aggies finished their conference schedule in a 3-way tie with Oklahoma and Oklahoma State. Oklahoma won the tiebreaker by having a higher BCS Ranking and eventually beat Nebraska in the Big 12 Championship.

It was Texas A&M's twelfth Cotton Bowl Classic appearance, tied for the second-most visits among any team. The Aggies' last trip to the Classic was in 2005 when they were defeated by Tennessee, 38–7. Overall Texas A&M holds a 5–8 record in the Cotton Bowl Classic, with their last win being a 41–13 victory over Oklahoma in 2013.

== Game summary ==
=== Scoring summary ===
Scoring play	Score
1st quarter
A&M – Uzoma Nwachukwu 6-yard pass from Ryan Tannehill (Randy Bullock kick), 13:01	A&M 7–0
A&M – Bullock 39-yard field goal, 5:03	A&M 10–0
LSU – Terrance Toliver 42-yard pass from Jordan Jefferson (Josh Jasper kick), 1:48	A&M 10–7
2nd quarter
LSU – Jefferson 1-yard run (Jasper kick), 10:13	LSU 14–10
A&M – Nwachukwu 14-yard pass from Cyrus Gray (Bullock kick), 7:44	A&M 17–14
LSU – Stevan Ridley 17-yard run (Jasper kick), 4:43	LSU 21–17
LSU – Toliver 2-yard pass from Jefferson (Jasper kick), 1:27	LSU 28–17
3rd quarter
LSU – Toliver 41-yard pass from Jefferson (Jasper kick), 12:06	LSU 35–17
4th quarter
A&M – Kenric McNeal 4-yard pass from Ryan Tannehill (Randy Bullock kick), 10:04	LSU 35–24
LSU – Jasper 50-yard field goal, 6:12	LSU 38–24
LSU – Jasper 26-yard field goal, 3:04	LSU 41–24

=== Statistics ===
Statistics	LSU	Texas A&M
First downs	24	23
Total offense, plays – yards	74–446	65–373
Rushes-yards (net)	55–288	29–155
Passing yards (net)	158	218
Passes, Comp-Att-Int	10–19–1	23–36–3
Time of Possession	37:26	22:34

== See also ==
- LSU–Texas A&M football rivalry
