= Jarrett Lee =

American gridiron football player (born 1989)

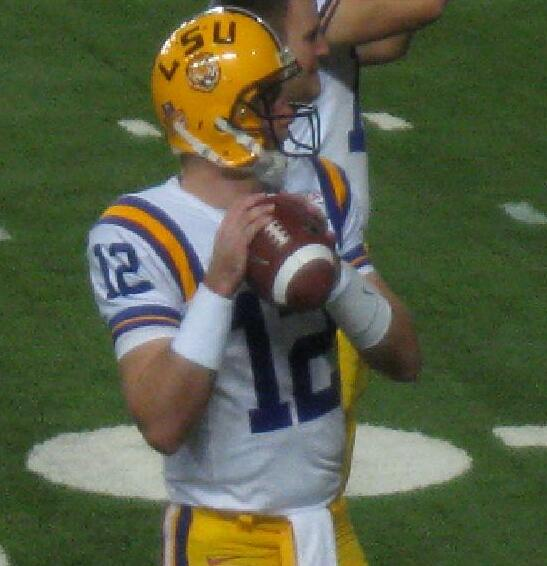
- Lee with the LSU Tigers in 2008

No. 12
- Position: Quarterback

Personal information
- Born: June 2, 1989 (age 37); San Angelo, Texas, U.S.
- Listed height: 6 ft 2 in (1.88 m)
- Listed weight: 206 lb (93 kg)

Career information
- High school: Brenham (TX)
- College: LSU
- NFL draft: 2012: undrafted

Career history
- San Diego Chargers (2012)*; BC Lions (2014)*
- * Offseason or practice squad member only

Awards and highlights
- BCS national champion (2007)

Calen Jarrett Lee (born June 2, 1989) is an American former football quarterback. He was signed by the San Diego Chargers as an undrafted free agent in 2012. He played college football at LSU.

== Early life ==
Lee started his high school football career at Brownwood High School in Brownwood, Texas, where he completed 98-of-168 passes for 1,700 yards and 18 touchdowns operating out of a one-back offense. He also rushed for 250 yards and four touchdowns.

Prior to his junior season, Lee transferred to Brenham High School as his father, Stephen, took a job on the staff as the wide receiver coach. Lee holds every major season and career passing record in Brenham High School football history. He finished with 6,182 career passing yards and 78 total touchdowns, more than doubling the previous record of 2,217 yards by Chip Matejowsky from 1985 through 1987. His 72 career touchdown passes eclipsed Charles Proske's next-best 28, and he is first and second for Brenham's single-season completion, attempt, touchdown, and passing yardage records.

Most recruiting experts considered Lee one of the top three quarterback prospects in Texas, besides Ryan Mallett of Texas High School in Texarkana, Texas, and Brock Mansion of Episcopal School of Dallas. Recruiting analyst Tom Lemming compared Lee to former Sam Houston State quarterback Rhett Bomar. Lee had more than 30 scholarship offers from Division I schools, and chose to attend LSU over Nebraska, Kansas State, Oklahoma, and others on May 30, 2006.

College recruiting
Name	Hometown	School	Height	Weight	40^{‡}	Commit date
Jarrett Lee; QB	Brenham, Texas	Brenham High School	6 ft 3 in (1.91 m)	192 lb (87 kg)	4.68	May 30, 2006
Jarrett Lee; QB	Recruit ratings: Scout: Rivals: (81)					
Overall recruit ranking: Scout: 15 (QB) Rivals: 7 (QB), 25 (TX) ESPN: 60, 10 (QB)
Note: In many cases, Scout, Rivals, 247Sports, On3, and ESPN may conflict in their listings of height and weight.; In these cases, the average was taken. ESPN grades are on a 100-point scale.; Sources: "2007 Team Ranking". Rivals.com.

== College career ==
=== 2007 season ===
Lee was the third-string quarterback at LSU behind then-senior Matt Flynn and redshirted sophomore Ryan Perrilloux. Considering his age, Lee redshirted for the 2007 season.

=== 2008 season ===
For the 2008 season, junior Ryan Perrilloux was projected to be the starting quarterback for LSU, but he was dismissed from the team for breaking team rules. Andrew Hatch started the first three games as quarterback, but was injured in the third game against Auburn. Beginning with the fourth game (Mississippi State), Lee started eight games as quarterback, compiling a 4–4 record. Three of the losses came against teams that were ranked #1 at some point during the year. Against Troy University, Lee led the largest comeback in LSU history taking an LSU team that trailed 31 to 3 in the 3rd quarter and scoring 37 unanswered points. An ankle injury ended Jarrett's season against Ole Miss, accounting for his fourth loss of the season. For the season, Lee threw an NCAA leading 7 interceptions that were returned for touchdowns. However, as one of only three freshman quarterbacks who have started more than six games for LSU, Lee put together one of the most prolific seasons for a freshman quarterback in LSU history, throwing for 1,873 yards and 14 touchdowns, second behind true freshman Tommy Hodson for yards and touchdowns.

=== 2009 season ===
In his only start of the 2009 season, Lee completed 7-of-22 (32%) passes in a homecoming game win against Louisiana Tech, a member of the Western Athletic Conference. For the season, he completed 16-of-40 (40%) passes for 197 yards, 2 touchdowns, and 1 interception. LSU's national rank in passing offense dropped from 71st in 2008 to 97th in 2009 with the replacing of Lee as the starter.

=== 2010 season ===
LSU had a 11–2 season in 2010. Although Lee did not start any games, he was called on to lead game-winning drives against Tennessee, Florida, and Auburn. He drove LSU down to the 2 yard line against Tennessee, threw a game-winning touchdown pass against Florida, but failed against Auburn. Against Alabama, he completed a critical 3rd down pass. For the season, Lee completed 54 of 89 (61%) passes for 573 yards, 2 touchdowns, and 1 interception. After the conclusion of his junior season, Lee had appeared in 30 career games, and he had passed for 2,643 yards and 18 touchdowns. Although LSU's national rank in passing was 107th, LSU's national rank in rushing was 28th.

=== 2011 season ===
Lee began the 2011 season as the starting quarterback because Jordan Jefferson was suspended for the first four games of the season. In the season opener against #3 Oregon, Lee helped lead LSU to a 40–27 victory although completing only 10 of 22 (45%) passes for less than 100 yards. Lee went on to lead the team to a 49–3 victory over Northwestern State, a 19–6 victory over Mississippi State, and a 47–21 victory over West Virginia before Jefferson was reinstated to the team. Lee continued to start, and win, for several more games, and fans were impressed with Lee's steady performance and leadership of the team. Lee had the second longest streak of consecutive passes thrown without an interception among all LSU quarterbacks, lasting from the fifth game in the 2010 season to the third game in the 2011 season.

Despite Lee's commendable performance for most of the season, Lee was pulled for his poor performance in the November game against Alabama. Lee finished the game 3 of 7 (43%) for 24 yards with 2 interceptions and a passer rating of 14.5. Lee was 2 of 2 for 19 yards when Jefferson was substituted for Lee to pick up a third and one on the fifth play of the game. Following a Lee interception which led to a blocked Alabama field goal attempt, Jefferson came in for Lee again, played the rest of the first half, and started the second half. Lee was given another chance in the second half but immediately threw his second interception of the game which led to an Alabama field goal

Following the Alabama game, the two quarterbacks were expected to rotate going forward; however, Lee saw very little playing time. The decision to give the starting role back to Jordan Jefferson was not without some controversy, and was questioned by some media and fans throughout the rest of the season.

This criticism reached a peak after the rematch loss to Alabama in the National Championship game, where Lee did not enter the game despite a poor performance by Jefferson. LSU finished the game as the only team in BCS championship history to not score a point. This caused heated exchanges from some fans and media, with the sharpest public criticism coming from former NFL quarterback Bobby Hebert in a post-game outburst where he demanded to know why Miles did not put Lee into the game. It was theorized that Hebert's rant was further motivated by the fact his son, offensive lineman T-Bob who started 26 games over the past three seasons, did not play in the game.

Lee finished the 2011 season with a passer rating of 152.0. Lee was selected by ESPN as the All-SEC senior team quarterback.

A week after the BCS title game, Lee was invited to play in the Casino del Sol College All-Star Game in Tucson. He finished 13 of 18 for 176 yards with two touchdowns and no interceptions. Lee played his second all-star game in less than a week at the NFLPA Collegiate Bowl, where he completed 2 of 6 passes for 36 yards, including a 13-yard touchdown pass to Isaiah Thomas.

=== College career statistics ===
Season	Games		Passing							
Season	GP	GS	Cmp	Att	Pct	Yds	TD	Int	Lng	Rtg
2008	11	8	143	269	53.2	1,873	14	16	66	116.9
2009	6	1	16	40	40.0	197	2	1	38	92.9
2010	10	0	54	89	60.7	573	2	1	47	119.4
2011	11	9	104	167	62.3	1,306	14	3	57	152.0
Total	38	18	317	565	56.1	3,949	32	21	66	126.1

== Professional career ==
Lee went undrafted in the 2012 NFL draft, but on April 29, 2012, Lee signed a contract with the San Diego Chargers. Lee was waived by the Chargers on August 31, 2012.

On March 4, 2014, Lee signed with the BC Lions. He was released by the Lions on May 14, 2014.
