= Andrew Hatch =

American football and baseball player (born 1986)

Profile
- Position: Quarterback

Personal information
- Born: July 18, 1986 (age 40)
- Listed height: 6 ft 3 in (1.91 m)
- Listed weight: 226 lb (103 kg)

Career information
- College: LSU Tigers (2007–2008); Harvard Crimson (2010)

Other information
- Baseball career
- Pitcher

NCAA Division I debut
- 2007, for the LSU Tigers

Last appearance
- 2011, for the Harvard Crimson
- Stats at Baseball Reference

Andrew Hatch (born July 18, 1986) is a former football and baseball player who played collegiately for both Harvard University and Louisiana State University, known for suffering multiple injuries during his tenure.

== Early life ==
Andrew Hatch grew up in San Diego, California. He went to high school in Henderson and Las Vegas, Nevada, where he played varsity football, basketball, and baseball, and was named "Athlete of the Year" at his high school when he graduated. He was also a National Merit Finalist. He was originally recruited to play for Brigham Young University by coach Gary Crowton. However, when Crowton left BYU, Hatch decided to go to Harvard University. He was the quarterback of Harvard's junior varsity football team his freshman year, then Hatch headed to Concepción, Chile, to serve a mission for the LDS Church in which he did not fully complete.

== LSU ==
After he returned from Chile, he earned a scholarship to play quarterback at Louisiana State University. In 2007, he was a backup quarterback for LSU, which went on to win the BCS National Championship. He received a medical redshirt after the season for a preseason shoulder injury which he had surgery for in early 2008. However, he was still the backup quarterback in the games against Middle Tennessee State, Alabama, and in the SEC Championship Game against Tennessee. He was 3-0 as the starting quarterback for LSU in 2008 until he suffered a concussion in the game against Auburn. When he came back after his injury, he rotated with Jarrett Lee in the games against Florida, South Carolina, and Georgia. He suffered a broken leg at the beginning of the game against Georgia, which ended his season. Hatch completed 25 of 45 passes for 282 yards and 2 touchdowns for the Tigers in 2008. He also rushed for 129 yards and 2 touchdowns on 35 carries. Because he wouldn't be healed in time to compete in the spring at LSU, he decided to finish his studies at Harvard. When Hatch left LSU, Coach Les Miles stated in a press release, "Don't underestimate what Andrew Hatch did for our football team in 2008. He filled a void for us at quarterback in 2008 and his play on the field allowed us to start the season off on a positive note. Even though an injury kept him out of action for the last half of the season, he still played a tremendous role in the success of our team. Andrew has a bright future and we wish him continued success both on the field and in the classroom."

== Harvard football ==
When Hatch transferred back to Harvard, the NCAA required that he sit out the following season. He was the scout team quarterback for Harvard in 2009 season. He then became the starting quarterback for Harvard's 2010 season. In the first game of the season against Holy Cross, Hatch completed 20 of 25 passes for 276 yards and 3 touchdowns. He was injured on the first play of the second game of the season against Brown. He received the National Football Foundation Hampshire Honor Society Award in May 2011, taking six years to complete his collegiate studies.

== Harvard baseball ==
When he finished playing football, he went on to play one season of baseball at Harvard. He pitched and played right field for Harvard's baseball team in the spring of 2011. He went 4 for 4 in his first full baseball game since high school, and he had a 1.84 ERA and 2-0 record as a relief pitcher. He was the winning pitcher with 3 scoreless innings in the Beanpot semifinal game against UMass, and he pitched 2 scoreless innings in the Beanpot Championship Game against Boston College at Fenway Park. He graduated from Harvard in the spring of 2012.
