= Michael Hodges (American football) =

American football player and coach (born 1986)

Cincinnati Bengals
- Title: Linebackers coach

Personal information
- Born: September 29, 1986 (age 40); San Antonio, Texas, U.S.
- Listed height: 6 ft 0 in (1.83 m)
- Listed weight: 226 lb (103 kg)

Career information
- Position: Linebacker
- High school: O'Connor (TX)
- College: Texas A&M

Career history
- Texas A&M (2011) Strength & conditioning assistant; Fresno State (2012–2013) Graduate assistant; Eastern Illinois (2014–2015) Linebackers coach; Eastern Illinois (2016) Co-defensive coordinator & safeties coach; New Orleans Saints (2017–2018) Defensive assistant; New Orleans Saints (2019) Assistant linebackers coach; New Orleans Saints (2020–2024) Linebackers coach; Cincinnati Bengals (2025–present) Linebackers coach

Michael Hodges (born September 29, 1986) is an American football coach who is the linebackers coach for the Cincinnati Bengals of the National Football League (NFL).

== Playing career ==
Hodges initially played college football at the United States Air Force Academy, before transferring to Blinn College in Brenham, Texas before opting to walk-on at Texas A&M. As a senior, he was awarded the Aggie Heart Award, the highest honor given to a senior.

== Coaching career ==
After his playing career ended, Hodges worked as a strength & conditioning assistant at Texas A&M while he worked on his master's degree. He then went on to coach at Fresno State as a graduate assistant working with the inside linebackers from 2012 to 2013. Hodges was hired to coach linebackers at Eastern Illinois in 2014, and was eventually promoted to co-defensive coordinator in 2016.

=== New Orleans Saints ===
Hodges was hired by the New Orleans Saints in 2017 to work as a defensive assistant. He was promoted to assistant linebackers coach in 2019.

He was promoted to linebackers coach in 2020 following the departure of Mike Nolan.

=== Cincinnati Bengals ===
Hodges was hired by the Cincinnati Bengals as their linebackers coach on January 27, 2025.

== Personal life ==
A native of Helotes, Texas, Hodges graduated from Texas A&M University with both a BS in Sports Management and a master's degree in marketing. He and his wife Ashley have two children.
