= Terrence Toliver =

American football player (born 1988)

No. 80, 86
- Position: Wide receiver

Personal information
- Born: May 7, 1988 (age 38); Hempstead, Texas, U.S.
- Listed height: 6 ft 5 in (1.96 m)
- Listed weight: 203 lb (92 kg)

Career information
- High school: Hempstead
- College: LSU
- NFL draft: 2011: undrafted

Career history
- Houston Texans (2011)*; Detroit Lions (2011)*; Omaha Nighthawks (2012); Detroit Lions (2012)*; Chicago Bears (2013)*; San Diego Chargers (2013)*; Chicago Bears (2013–2014)*; Hamilton Tiger-Cats (2015–2018)
- * Offseason or practice squad member only

Awards and highlights
- BCS national champion (2008); Freshman All-SEC (2007)

Career CFL statistics
- Receptions: 146
- Receiving yards: 2,176
- Receiving touchdowns: 16
- Stats at CFL.ca
- Stats at Pro Football Reference

Terrence Lee Toliver (born May 7, 1988) is an American former professional football player who was a wide receiver in the Canadian Football League (NFL). In 2011, he was signed as an undrafted free agent by the Houston Texans of the National Football League (NFL) and later played for the Detroit Lions that year. He played college football for the LSU Tigers. He was LSU's leading receiver in 2010 and was selected as the offensive most valuable player in the 2011 Cotton Bowl Classic. In 53 games at LSU, Toliver totaled 126 catches for 1,820 yards.

== Early life ==
Toliver attended Hempstead High School in Hempstead, Texas. He had 44 receptions for 869 yards and six touchdowns as a senior and 50 receptions for 785 yards and 11 touchdowns as a junior.

Toliver was rated the number one wide receiver in the nation by Scout.com and ESPN.com. He committed to LSU in February 2007.

== College career ==
As a true freshman in 2007, Toliver started two of 14 games, finishing with 10 receptions for 249 yards and three touchdowns. After the season, he was named to the Southeastern Conference all-freshman team. As a sophomore in 2008, he started 2 of 13 games, making 22 receptions for 257 yards and a touchdown and emerging as LSU's No. 3 receiver.

In 2009, Toliver became a starter after Demetrius Byrd was selected into the NFL. In the 2009 season opener against Washington, he caught four passes for 117 yards and two touchdowns. He finished the season with 53 catches for 735 yards. In the 2010 Capital One Bowl against Penn State, he had six catches for 81 yards.

Before the start of the 2010 season, Toliver broke his hand and was tasered by police in a fight outside a Tigerland bar. As a senior in 2010, Toliver returned from a hand injury to become LSU's lead receiver. He started all 13 games for LSU and finished the season with 41 receptions for 579 yards. Against Florida, he had six catches for 111 yards and two touchdowns and scored the winning touchdown with six seconds left in the game.

In his final game for LSU, he caught five passes for 112 yards and three touchdowns against Texas A&M in the 2011 Cotton Bowl Classic. He was selected as the most valuable offensive player in the game. He also tied a Cotton Bowl record with three touchdown catches. Commenting on returning to his home state of Texas to play in his final collegiate game, Tolliver said:

I had a lot of family support here today. Playing in Jerry's World, the new Texas Stadium, just playing back at home, I always wanted to do this. Play a Texas school and come out with a victory.

Toliver was also selected to play for the East All-Star team in the 2011 East–West Shrine Game. Although he did not make a catch in the Shrine Game, ESPN draft analyst Todd McShay noted, "Terrence Toliver of LSU has had a big week. He's really showed he could be a playmaker and get down the field and catch the ball over his head."

== Professional career ==
=== Houston Texans ===
Toliver went undrafted in the 2011 NFL draft. He signed as a free agent with the Houston Texans on July 26, 2011. The Texans waived Toliver off injured reserve with injury settlement on September 12, 2011.

=== Detroit Lions ===
Toliver was signed to the Lions practice squad in 2011. On August 27, 2012, Toliver was cut by the Lions.

=== Chicago Bears ===
On January 7, 2013, Toliver was signed by the Bears. Toliver was waived on July 31 in order for the Bears to meet the 53-man roster.

=== San Diego Chargers ===
On September 5, 2013, Toliver was signed by the San Diego Chargers.

=== Chicago Bears (II) ===
Toliver was brought back by the Bears on October 28, 2013. He was waived on July 31, 2014, with an injury settlement.

=== Hamilton Tiger-Cats ===
On April 8, 2015, Toliver was signed by the Hamilton Tiger-Cats of the Canadian Football League. Terrence Toliver had a decent first season in the CFL, catching 48 passes for 678 yards with 6 touchdowns. He took a step forward in the 2016 season, catching 65 passes for 1,036 yards with 9 touchdowns. During the first game of the 2017 season, Toliver suffered a torn ACL and MCL injury on a tackle from former teammate Cassius Vaughn, resulting in him missing the remainder of the season. After recovering, Toliver played in 12 games for Hamilton in 2018, but finished on the injured list again. Toliver did catch 32 passes for 456 yards and one major. He was not re-signed for the 2019 season and became a free agent, and hasn't signed a football contract since, effectively ending his playing career.
