= Coryell Judie =

American football player (born 1987)

No. 23
- Position: Cornerback

Personal information
- Born: October 14, 1987 (age 39); Marlin, Texas, U.S.
- Listed height: 5 ft 11 in (1.80 m)
- Listed weight: 190 lb (86 kg)

Career information
- High school: Marlin (TX)
- College: Texas A&M
- NFL draft: 2012: undrafted

Career history
- Denver Broncos (2012)*; Edmonton Eskimos (2013)*; Portland Thunder (2014–2015)*; Calgary Stampeders (2014)*
- * Offseason or practice squad member only

Coryell Judie (born October 14, 1987) is an American former football cornerback. After playing college football for Texas A&M, he was signed by the Denver Broncos as an undrafted free agent in 2012.

== Professional career ==
=== Pre-draft ===
Judie was considered one of the top cornerbacks and a projected 6th round selection in the 2012 NFL Draft.

Pre-draft measurables
Height	Weight	Arm length	Hand span	40-yard dash	20-yard shuttle	Three-cone drill	Vertical jump	Broad jump
6 ft 0 in (1.83 m)	194 lb (88 kg)	30 1/4 in (0.77 m)	8 3/4 in (0.22 m)	4.48 s	4.25 s	7.33 s	37 in (0.94 m)	10 ft 6 in (3.20 m)
All values from NFL Combine

=== Denver Broncos ===
Judie signed with the Denver Broncos as an undrafted free agent following the 2012 NFL draft. He was waived on July 25, 2012.

=== Portland Thunder ===
Judie was assigned to the Portland Thunder on October 9, 2013.
