= Tyler Bray =

American football player (born 1991)

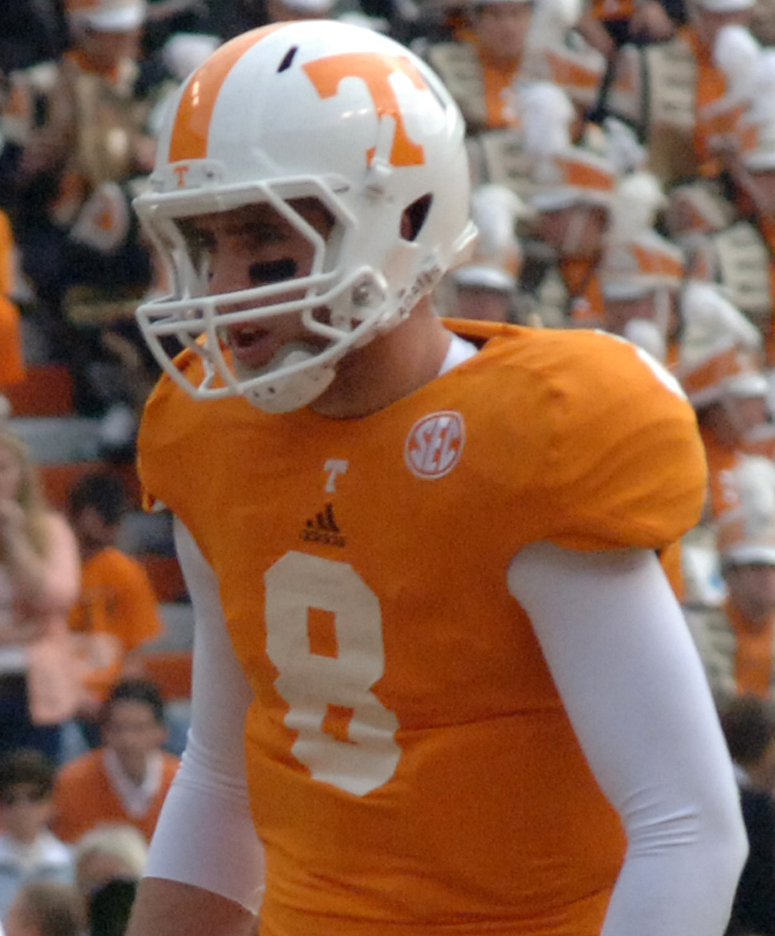
- Bray with the Tennessee Volunteers in 2012

No. 9, 8
- Position: Quarterback

Personal information
- Born: December 27, 1991 (age 34); Clovis, California, U.S.
- Listed height: 6 ft 6 in (1.98 m)
- Listed weight: 223 lb (101 kg)

Career information
- High school: Kingsburg (Kingsburg, California)
- College: Tennessee
- NFL draft: 2013: undrafted

Career history
- Kansas City Chiefs (2013–2017); Chicago Bears (2018–2020); San Francisco 49ers (2021)*
- * Offseason or practice squad member only

Career NFL statistics
- Passing completions: 1
- Passing attempts: 6
- Passing yards: 18
- TD–INT: 0–0
- Passer rating: 40.9
- Stats at Pro Football Reference

Tyler Ian Bray (born December 27, 1991) is an American former professional football player who was a quarterback in the National Football League (NFL). After playing college football for the Tennessee Volunteers, he declared himself eligible for the 2013 NFL draft, in which he went undrafted. He spent five seasons with the Kansas City Chiefs before joining the Chicago Bears.

== Early life ==
Bray attended Kingsburg High School in Kingsburg, California. As a senior on the Vikings football team, he led his team to a perfect 13–0 season while throwing for 3,321 yards with 41 touchdowns. A 4-star recruit, he was considered the seventh best pro-style quarterback recruit by Rivals.com and 26th best by Scout.com. Bray chose to accept Tennessee's offer after he had already verbally committed to San Diego State.

== College career ==
=== 2010 season ===
In his freshman season at the University of Tennessee under head coach Derek Dooley in 2010, Bray appeared in nine games. On September 4, 2010, Bray made his first appearance for the Volunteers in the season-opening home victory at Neyland Stadium over Tennessee-Martin. He came into the game late to relieve Matt Simms in the 50–0 victory. After relief appearances against Georgia in a 41–14 loss at Sanford Stadium and #7 Alabama in a 41–10 loss at home, Bray had a solid appearance against South Carolina at Williams-Brice Stadium. Simms was benched in the third quarter for Bray. Against the Gamecocks, Bray threw his first two collegiate touchdowns in the 38–24 defeat. Bray started his first career game on November 6 against the Memphis Tigers. The Vols earned their first victory in five tries, 50–14, while Bray went 19–33 for 325 yards, five touchdowns, and no interceptions and set Tennessee football records for most yards (308) and touchdowns (5) in a half. The next week against Ole Miss at home, Bray finished 18–of-34 for 323 yards with five touchdowns as the Vols defeated the Rebels by a score of 52–14. In his first SEC start on the road, Bray completed 16–27 passes for 232 yards, two touchdowns and two interceptions in a win over the Vanderbilt Commodores by a score of 24–10 at Vanderbilt Stadium. During the final home game of the season against Kentucky, Bray led Tennessee to a 24–14 victory while going 20–38 for 354 yards, two touchdowns, and two interceptions. Bray led the Vols to a 4–0 record in November, making them bowl eligible at 6–6. Tennessee was selected to play in the Music City Bowl in Nashville, Tennessee, where Bray completed 27-of-45 passes for 312 yards, four touchdowns, and three interceptions in a 27–30 2OT loss against the North Carolina Tar Heels. He finished the season 125-of-224 for 1,849 passing yards and 18 touchdowns, all Tennessee freshman records while also throwing 10 interceptions. Among freshman Division I quarterbacks in 2010, he ranked third in quarterback rating (142.73), tied for fourth in touchdowns, sixth in passing yards per game (205.4), and 10th in total yards.

=== 2011 season ===
In his sophomore year, Bray began the 2011 season as the starter for the Volunteers. In the season opener at home, Bray completed 17–of-24 passes while throwing for 293 yards and three touchdowns against Montana in a 42–16 victory. The next week against Cincinnati and their head coach Butch Jones, who would end up coaching the Tennessee Volunteers starting in the 2013 season, Bray completed 34-of-41 passes for 405 yards and four touchdowns as the Vols won by a score 45–23 at home. In the victory over the Bearcats, Bray broke former Tennessee All-American quarterback Peyton Manning's record by throwing at least two touchdown passes in eight consecutive games. In the Cincinnati game, Bray had the second highest completion percentage ever recorded in a game by a Tennessee quarterback of 82.9%, second to Tee Martin's 95.8% against South Carolina in 1998. For the third game of the season, Bray and the Volunteers faced off against the Florida Gators, a rival Tennessee had not beaten since 2004. On Tennessee's opening drive, sophomore wide receiver Justin Hunter went down with a torn ACL. The attitude of the team was noticeably different due to the absence of Hunter and the Vols ended up losing to Florida by a score of 33–23 in The Swamp. Bray finished the day 26-of-48 for 288 yards and three touchdowns with two interceptions. The Vols' next game was a 41–10 victory over Buffalo as Bray threw for 342 yards and four touchdowns. After the victory over the Bulls, the next week would bring a setback for Bray. Against the Georgia Bulldogs at home, Bray broke his thumb late in the game and would be sidelined for several weeks. The Vols lost to the Bulldogs by a score of 20–12 as Bray threw for 251 yards, with Matt Simms reliving Bray late in the game. Because of his injury, Bray would not play in the next five games (against LSU, Alabama, South Carolina, Middle Tennessee, and Arkansas). The Volunteers went 1–4 during Bray's absence, but the team remained alive for bowl eligibility. Bray came back during the Vanderbilt game and led the Vols to a much-needed home victory against the Commodores. Bray finished the game 16-of-33 for 189 yards and two touchdowns with two interceptions in the 27–21 overtime victory. In the final game of the season, the Vols lost to the Kentucky Wildcats by a score of 10–7 at Commonwealth Stadium. The result was the program's first loss to Kentucky in 26 years. Bray had 215 yards, one touchdown, and two interceptions in the loss. The Volunteers ended the season with a 5–7 record and were not bowl eligible for the first time since 2008.

=== 2012 season ===
Going into his junior season, Bray and the rest of the Volunteers entered the 2012 season with very high expectations, but those expectations never panned out on the field. The 2012 season was Bray's only season where he started all 12 games for the Volunteers. The season started off promising in the Chick-fil-A Kickoff Game at the Georgia Dome in Atlanta against NC State. The Volunteers defeated the Wolfpack by a score of 35–21. In the victory, Bray had 333 passing yards and two touchdowns. After a 51–13 blowout win over Georgia State, Tennessee entered the conference slate looking to finally achieve long-awaited victory over some conference rivals. However, against Florida, the season began to fade. In the 37–20 defeat, Bray performed well in the first half but had a lethargic second half. In the loss, he passed for 257 yards with two touchdowns and two interceptions. The loss against the Gators, which was the program's eighth consecutive in the rivalry, exposed a serious problem with the Volunteers in the 2012 season, which was their defense. Over the course of the rest of the season, Bray mostly played well but mainly because it was a necessity to offset the mediocre defense. The next week, the Vols defeated Akron by a score of 47–26 with Bray passing for 401 yards, four touchdowns, and an interception. The next week, against the Georgia Bulldogs at Sanford Stadium, Bray passed for 281 yards, two touchdowns, and three interceptions in the 51–44 loss. Two weeks later, the Vols faced Mississippi State at Davis Wade Stadium and lost by a score of 41–31. In the loss, Bray had 148 passing yards, two touchdowns, and one interception. The next week, against Alabama, Bray did not fare well against the eventual national champions. He had 184 passing yards and two interceptions in the 44–13 home loss. The following game was against South Carolina at Williams-Brice Stadium. Bray performed statistically well in the 38–35 loss. He recorded 368 passing yards, four touchdowns, and one interception. The next week against the Troy Trojans at home marked a career day for Bray but a very ominous reality for the Tennessee football team as a whole. In the 55–48 victory, Bray set a school-record with 530 passing yards and five touchdowns. Bray's performance was needed, though, as the Tennessee defense gave up a school-record 721 total yards to the Trojans. Peyton Manning previously held the school record with a 523-yard performance against Kentucky in 1997. The next week, the Vols, still in contention for bowl eligibility, faced the Missouri Tigers at home. The Tigers ended up outlasting the Vols in 4OT by a score of 51–48. Bray had 404 passing yards and four touchdowns in the loss. In the following game against Vanderbilt at Vanderbilt Stadium, Bray had his worst game of the season. Bray had 103 passing yards, one touchdown, and two interceptions in the 41–18 loss. He was benched in the game for Justin Worley in a move by head coach Derek Dooley. The loss eliminated Tennessee from bowl eligibility, and Dooley was fired after the game. In the final game of his Tennessee career, Bray performed well against the Kentucky Wildcats at home. In the 37–17 victory, Bray had 293 passing yards and four touchdowns.

On the year, Bray went 268-of-451 for 3,612 yards with 34 touchdowns and 12 interceptions. Bray's 3,612 passing yards rank as 11th in a single-season in SEC history. With 34 touchdown passes, he posted the seventh-most touchdown passes in a season in SEC history.

For Bray's career of 28 games, he landed on several Tennessee all-time career lists:

- Fourth in touchdowns (69)
- Fourth in pass yards (7,444)
- Fifth in completions (540)
- Fourth in attempts (922)

On January 9, 2013, Bray, along with college teammates Cordarrelle Patterson, Justin Hunter, and Darrington Sentimore, announced his intention to leave college early and declare for the 2013 NFL draft.

=== College statistics ===
Year	Team	Games			Passing								Rushing			
Year	Team	GP	GS	Record	Cmp	Att	Pct	Yds	Avg	TD	INT	Rtg	Att	Yds	Avg	TD
2010	Tennessee	9	5	4–1	125	224	55.8	1,849	8.3	18	10	142.7	20	-103	-5.2	0
2011	Tennessee	7	7	4–3	147	247	59.5	1,983	8.0	17	6	144.8	26	-70	-2.7	1
2012	Tennessee	12	12	5–7	268	451	59.4	3,612	8.0	34	12	146.3	15	-34	-2.3	0
Total		28	24	13–11	540	922	58.6	7,444	8.1	69	28	145.0	61	-207	-3.4	1

== Professional career ==
Pre-draft measurables
Height	Weight	Arm length	Hand span	40-yard dash	10-yard split	20-yard split	20-yard shuttle	Three-cone drill	Broad jump	Wonderlic
6 ft 6 1/8 in (1.98 m)	232 lb (105 kg)	33 in (0.84 m)	9 1/4 in (0.23 m)	5.05 s	1.72 s	2.91 s	4.51 s	7.20 s	8 ft 4 in (2.54 m)	24
All values from NFL Scouting Combine

=== Kansas City Chiefs ===
Bray went undrafted in the 2013 NFL draft, but he would later sign with the Kansas City Chiefs as an undrafted free agent.

During the 2013 preseason, Bray played in three of the four games. The majority of his play came in the final preseason game against the Green Bay Packers. He completed 14-of-25 passing attempts and threw for 169 yards, three touchdowns, and one interception and played a key role in the 30–8 Chiefs win. Following the preseason, Bray made the final 53-man roster. Bray was inactive most of the season, until the Chiefs final regular season game against the San Diego Chargers when Bray was active for the first time in his career. Bray, however, did not play in the game.

Bray spent the 2014 season on injured reserve.

In January 2015, Bray tore an ACL, and on September 1, 2015, the Chiefs put Bray on the Non-Football Injury list.

In Week 17 of the 2017 season, Bray made his NFL debut against the Denver Broncos. Late in the 27–24 victory, he came in to relieve Patrick Mahomes. His first career snap resulted in a failed handoff, which in turn resulted in a fumble return for a touchdown for the Broncos. Later, he had two successful handoffs and one incomplete pass before Mahomes returned to the game.

=== Chicago Bears ===
On March 16, 2018, Bray signed a one-year contract with the Chicago Bears. He was waived on September 1, and was signed to the practice squad the next day. Bray was reunited with former offensive coordinator Matt Nagy, who had just become the head coach of the Bears. He was promoted to the active roster on November 21, to serve as the backup to Chase Daniel following an injury to starter Mitchell Trubisky. He was waived on December 29, and re-signed to the practice squad after clearing waivers on January 1, 2019.

On March 20, 2019, the Bears re-signed Bray to a one-year deal. He was released on August 31 as part of final roster cuts before being moved to the practice squad. He was promoted to the active roster on October 5, serving as the backup to Chase Daniel, who was making his first start of the year against the Oakland Raiders in place of an injured Trubisky. Bray was released four days later and re-signed back to the practice squad. His practice squad contract with the team expired on January 6, 2020.

Bray re-signed with the Bears on March 26, 2020. After being one of the final roster cuts on September 5, he returned to the practice squad a day later. During the first four weeks of the season, he was occasionally protected from poaching by other teams. Bray was elevated to the active roster on October 3 ahead of the Bears' Week 4 game against the Indianapolis Colts, and reverted to the practice squad after the game. Further elevations took place later in the season after Trubisky was injured, in Weeks 9 and 10 against the Tennessee Titans and Minnesota Vikings, respectively. Bray entered the latter game following an injury to Nick Foles on the Bears' final drive, where he completed an 18-yard screen pass to Ryan Nall on his first throw followed by four incompletions (one of which was a spike to stop the clock) as the Bears lost 19–13. Bray was again elevated to the active roster on November 28 for the team's Week 12 game against the Green Bay Packers, and reverted to the practice squad again following the game. His practice squad contract with the team expired after the season on January 18, 2021.

=== San Francisco 49ers ===
On December 29, 2021, Bray was signed to the San Francisco 49ers practice squad. He was released by San Francisco on January 12, 2022.

=== NFL career statistics ===
Year	Team	Games		Passing								Rushing				Fumbles	
Year	Team	GP	GS	Cmp	Att	Pct	Yds	Avg	TD	Int	Rtg	Att	Yds	Avg	TD	Fum	Lost
2013	KC	0	0	DNP													
2014	KC	0	0	DNP													
2015	KC	0	0	DNP													
2016	KC	0	0	DNP													
2017	KC	1	0	0	1	0.0	0	0.0	0	0	39.6	1	0	0.0	0	1	1
2018	CHI	0	0	DNP													
2019	CHI	0	0	DNP													
2020	CHI	1	0	1	5	20.0	18	3.6	0	0	42.1	0	0	0.0	0	0	0
Total		2	0	1	6	16.7	18	3	0	0	39.6	1	0	0.0	0	1	1

== Personal life ==
Bray is an enrolled member of Citizen Potawatomi Nation.
