= 2010 Ole Miss Rebels football team =

American college football season

2010 Ole Miss Rebels football
- Conference: Southeastern Conference
- Western Division
- Record: 0–8, 4 wins vacated (0–7 SEC, 1 win vacated)
- Head coach: Houston Nutt (3rd season)
- Offensive coordinator: David Rader (1st season)
- Offensive scheme: Multiple
- Defensive coordinator: Tyrone Nix (3rd season)
- Base defense: 4–3
- Home stadium: Vaught–Hemingway Stadium

2010 Southeastern Conference football standings
	Conf.			Overall
Team	W		L	W		L
Eastern Division
No. 22 South Carolina x	5	–	3	9	–	5
Florida	4	–	4	8	–	5
Georgia	3	–	5	6	–	7
Tennessee	3	–	5	6	–	7
Kentucky	2	–	6	6	–	7
Vanderbilt	1	–	7	2	–	10
Western Division
No. 1 Auburn x$#	8	–	0	14	–	0
No. 12 Arkansas %	6	–	2	10	–	3
No. 8 LSU	6	–	2	11	–	2
No. 10 Alabama	5	–	3	10	–	3
No. 15 Mississippi State	4	–	4	9	–	4
Ole Miss*	1	–	7	4	–	8
Championship: Auburn 56, South Carolina 17
# – BCS National Champion; $ – BCS representative as conference champion; % – BCS at-large representative; x – Division champion/co-champions; * Ole Miss vacated all wins due to NCAA violations.; Rankings from AP Poll

The 2010 Ole Miss Rebels football team represented the University of Mississippi during the 2010 NCAA Division I FBS football season. The team was coached by Houston Nutt, who was in his third season as the Rebels' head coach. Ole Miss has been a member of the Southeastern Conference (SEC) since the league's inception in 1932, and has participated in that conference's Western Division since its formation in 1992. The Rebels played seven home games in 2010 at Vaught–Hemingway Stadium in Oxford, Mississippi, which has been Ole Miss football's home since 1915. They finished the season 4–8, 1–7 in SEC play.

On February 11, 2019, Ole Miss announced the vacation of all wins in the years 2010, 2011, 2012, and 2016. In 2013, all wins except the Music City Bowl were vacated. In 2014, all wins except the Presbyterian game were vacated.

== Preseason ==
Jeremiah Masoli, former Oregon quarterback, walked on to the team months after being dismissed from Oregon.

== Schedule ==
Ole Miss started their season against Jacksonville State and then a road game against Tulane. The Rebels hosted SEC opponents Vanderbilt, Kentucky, Auburn and Mississippi State and travelled to Alabama, Arkansas, Tennessee and LSU. The Rebels played host to the Ragin Cajuns of Louisiana Lafayette for their homecoming game on November 6.

Date	Time	Opponent	Site	TV	Result	Attendance
September 4	2:30 p.m.	No. 17 (FCS) Jacksonville State*	Vaught–Hemingway Stadium; Oxford, Mississippi	CSS	L 48–49 ^{2OT}	55,768
September 11	8:00 p.m.	at Tulane*	Louisiana Superdome; New Orleans (rivalry)	ESPNC	W 27–13 (vacated)	36,389
September 18	11:21 a.m.	Vanderbilt	Vaught–Hemingway Stadium; Oxford, Mississippi (rivalry)	SECN	L 14–28	51,667
September 25	6:30 p.m.	Fresno State*	Vaught–Hemingway Stadium; Oxford, Mississippi	CSS	W 55–38 (vacated)	55,267
October 2	11:21 a.m.	Kentucky	Vaught–Hemingway Stadium; Oxford, Mississippi	SECN	W 42–35 (vacated)	55,344
October 16	8:00 p.m.	at No. 8 Alabama	Bryant–Denny Stadium; Tuscaloosa, Alabama (rivalry)	ESPN2	L 10–23	101,821
October 23	11:21 a.m.	at No. 21 Arkansas	Donald W. Reynolds Razorback Stadium; Fayetteville, Arkansas (rivalry)	SECN	L 24–38	73,619
October 30	5:00 p.m.	No. 3 Auburn	Vaught–Hemingway Stadium; Oxford, Mississippi (rivalry)	ESPN2	L 31–51	61,474
November 6	6:00 p.m.	Louisiana–Lafayette*^{†}	Vaught–Hemingway Stadium; Oxford, Mississippi	ESPNU	W 43–21 (vacated)	53,144
November 13	12:00 p.m.	at Tennessee	Neyland Stadium; Knoxville, Tennessee (rivalry)	CBS	L 14–52	96,044
November 20	2:30 p.m.	at No. 5 LSU	Tiger Stadium; Baton Rouge, Louisiana (Magnolia Bowl)	CBS	L 36–43	92,915
November 27	6:00 p.m.	No. 25 Mississippi State	Vaught–Hemingway Stadium; Oxford, Mississippi (Egg Bowl)	ESPNU	L 23–31	58,625
*Non-conference game; ^{†}Homecoming; Rankings from AP Poll; All times are in Central time

== Game summaries ==
=== Jacksonville State ===
Team	1	2	3	4	OT	2OT	Total
• Jacksonville State	7	3	3	21	7	8	49
Mississippi	14	17	0	3	7	7	48

- Location: Oxford, Mississippi
- Game start: 2:30 p.m.
- Elapsed time: 3:40
- Game attendance: 55,768
- Game weather: 77 (Sunny and Clear with Calm Wind)
- Referee: Marc Curles
- Television network: CSS

The Ole Miss Rebels began their 2010 football season playing FCS opponent Jacksonville State. The Rebels got off to a hot start with Sophomore quarterback Nathan Stanley throwing two long touchdown passes, and would later add a third in the second quarter. A one-yard touchdown run by Enrique Davis gave the Rebels a 31–10 lead at halftime. However, Jacksonville State would score sixteen unanswered points in the second half and tied the game at 34–34 with eighteen seconds left. The Gamecocks converted a two-point conversion on the final play to give them a 49–48 victory. It was the Rebels first loss to an FCS opponent in school history.

=== Tulane ===
Team	1	2	3	4	Total
• Mississippi	14	10	0	3	27
Tulane	0	3	7	3	13

- Location: New Orleans, Louisiana
- Game start: 8:07 p.m.
- Elapsed time: 3:00
- Game attendance: 36,389
- Game weather: 72 (Indoor Stadium)
- Referee: Steve Barth
- Television network: ESPN 2/ ESPN Classic

Coming off a devastating loss in their opener, the Rebels traveled to Tulane to get back on track. They got off to a fast start scoring touchdowns on their first two possessions. A 70-yard touchdown pass from newly named starting quarterback Jeremiah Masoli gave the Rebels a 24–3 lead at halftime. Despite ten unanswered points from the Green Wave, the Rebels won the game 27–13 giving them their first victory of the season. It was their 10th consecutive victory over the Green Wave and gave them a 42–28 series lead.

=== Vanderbilt ===
Team	1	2	3	4	Total
• Vanderbilt	0	14	7	7	28
Mississippi	0	7	7	0	14

- Location: Oxford, Mississippi
- Game start: 11:21 p.m.
- Elapsed time: 3:28
- Game attendance: 51,667
- Game weather: 81 (Clear with Calm Winds)
- Referee: Penn Wagers
- Television network: SEC Network

The Rebels hosted the Vanderbilt Commodores in their SEC opener, who had lost 10 straight games within the Southeastern Conference. After a scoreless first quarter, Vanderbilt running back Zac Stacy rushed for a 35-yard touchdown to put the Commodores ahead 7–0. The Rebels would find themselves down 14–0 with under two minutes left in the first half. The Rebels would eventually tie the game at 14–14 with a 28-yard touchdown run by Jeremiah Masoli, but the Commodores responded :12 later with an 80-yard touchdown run by Warren Norman. A Masoli interception with 1:50 remaining would seal the win for Vanderbilt, their second consecutive victory at Vaught–Hemingway Stadium. With the loss, the Rebels fell to 1–2, 0–1 in the SEC.

=== Fresno State ===
Team	1	2	3	4	Total
Fresno State	7	3	14	14	38
• Mississippi	14	13	14	14	55

- Location: Oxford, Mississippi
- Game start: 6:30 p.m.
- Elapsed time: 3:39
- Game attendance: 55,267
- Game weather: 73 (Mostly Cloudy)
- Referee: Ken Williamson
- Television network: CSS

The Rebels took the field on Family Night against the Fresno State Bulldogs. The Bulldogs got the scoring going early with a 16-yard touchdown pass from Ryan Colburn. The Rebels responded in a big way by scoring 21 consecutive points, and built a 27–10 halftime lead. Brandon Bolden rushed for a 71-yard touchdown right out of the gate in the second half, and the Rebels would not turn back. The Rebels defeated the Bulldogs 55–38 to earn their first victory of the season at Vaught–Hemingway Stadium. Bolden would finish the day with a career-high 228 rushing yards and 3 total touchdowns.

=== Kentucky ===
Team	1	2	3	4	Total
Kentucky	7	10	3	15	35
• Mississippi	7	14	14	7	42

- Location: Oxford, Mississippi
- Game start: 11:21 p.m.
- Elapsed time: 3:54
- Game attendance: 55,344
- Game weather: 64 (Calm)
- Referee: Hubert Owens
- Television network: SEC Network

Ole Miss faced the Kentucky Wildcats looking to capture their first winning streak of the season. The Wildcats built an early 14–7 lead, but it was quickly lost with two touchdowns within 2 minutes of each other by the Rebels. Ole Miss captured the momentum in the third quarter with two touchdowns (a pass and run) by Jeremiah Masoli. Despite a comeback attempt by Kentucky, Brandon Bolden ran for 33 yards on third-and-19 to seal the victory. It was the first SEC win for the Rebels and their first winning streak since November 21, 2009. Masoli finished the game with a season-high 4 touchdowns.

=== Alabama ===
Team	1	2	3	4	Total
Mississippi	0	3	7	0	10
• #8 Alabama	10	6	7	0	23

- Location: Tuscaloosa, Alabama
- Game start: 8:15 p.m.
- Elapsed time: 3:18
- Game attendance: 101,821
- Game weather: 62 (Clear Skies with Calm Winds)
- Referee: Matt Austin
- Television network: ESPN2

Coming off their bye-week, the Rebels traveled to Tuscaloosa to take on the Crimson Tide. The Tide were coming off their first loss of the season and had dropped eight spots in the rankings from #1. The Rebels struggled offensively going three-and-out on their first three possessions. Bama's defense held Ole Miss to just 243 yards and 10 points (both season lows). Jeremiah Masoli threw the only offensive touchdown for the Rebels late in the third quarter to Melvin Harris. An interception by Mark Barron in the fourth quarter ended the Rebels' chances as they fell to the defending champions 23–10. Despite the loss, the Rebels defense played their best game of the season as they allowed just 100 rushing yards by Mark Ingram II and Trent Richardson, and sacked Greg McElroy 5 times.

=== Arkansas ===
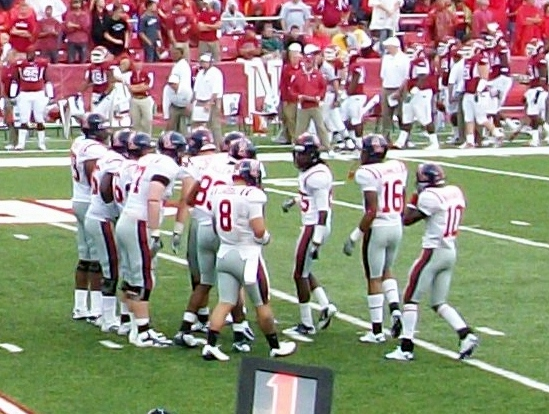
Jeremiah Masoli enters the Ole Miss huddle during the Arkansas game

Team	1	2	3	4	Total
Mississippi	0	3	7	14	24
• #21 Arkansas	14	7	3	14	38

- Location: Fayetteville, Arkansas
- Game start: 12:30 p.m.
- Elapsed time: 3:24
- Game attendance: 73,619
- Game weather: 69 (Cloudy with Strong Winds)
- Referee: Steve Shaw
- Television network: SEC Network

The Rebels traveled to Fayetteville to face the Arkansas Razorbacks in week 8. It was an incredibly slow start for the Rebels as they found themselves trailing 21–0 halfway through the second quarter. Ole Miss got back in the game however with an 18-yard touchdown pass from Jeremiah Masoli. Following a 30-minute lightning delay, Masoli hooked up with Markeith Summers for a 43-yard touchdown pass to cut to Razorback lead 24–17. Knile Davis ran for a 71-yard touchdown two plays later, but Masoli answered with another touchdown pass to Summers to make the score 31–24. Another lightning delay suspended play immediately following the score. Despite a valiant effort to come back, the Rebels' defense could not gather themselves as they gave up a 22-yard touchdown run by Knile Davis to put the game away. With the loss, the Rebels fell below .500 for the third time on the year, and fell to 3–4 for the second time under Houston Nutt. Masoli finished the game with a season-high 327 pass yards and 3 touchdowns.

=== Auburn ===
Team	1	2	3	4	Total
• #3 Auburn	14	20	10	7	51
Mississippi	14	3	0	14	31

- Location: Oxford, Mississippi
- Game start: 5:00 p.m.
- Elapsed time: 3:20
- Game attendance: 61,474
- Game weather: 68 (Clear with Fair Winds)
- Referee: Matt Moore
- Television network: ESPN2

The Rebels took the field on Saturday night against the Auburn Tigers, the #1 ranked team in the BCS. Ole Miss kicked the game off with a punch as Jeff Scott ran 83 yards for a touchdown on the second play of the game. The Tigers quickly responded as Cam Newton caught a 20-yard touchdown pass from Kodi Burns. Auburn took the lead with a 68-yard touchdown run by Onterio McCalebb, but the Rebels tied the game a few minutes later with a 29-yard touchdown pass from Jeremiah Masoli to Markeith Summers. The Rebels were toe-to-toe with the Tigers after one quarter, but things went downhill after that. Auburn went on a 30–3 scoring run entering the fourth quarter. Brandon Bolden scored 2 touchdowns in the fourth quarter, but it was not enough to overcome the Tigers. The Rebels fell 51–31, and found themselves 3–5 on the season (1–4 in SEC play). Jeff Scott ran for a career-high 134 yards and a touchdown.

=== Louisiana–Lafayette ===
Team	1	2	3	4	Total
Louisiana–Lafayette	7	14	0	0	21
• Mississippi	24	6	3	10	43

- Location: Oxford, Mississippi
- Game start: 6:00 p.m.
- Elapsed time: 3:23
- Game attendance: 53,144
- Game weather: 54 (Fair with Calm Winds)
- Referee: Penn Wagers
- Television network: ESPNU

The Rebels took the field on Homecoming Night against the ULL Ragin' Cajuns. The Cajuns got the scoring going early with a 27-yard touchdown pass, but the Rebels responded with 27 unanswered points. Starting quarterback Jeremiah Masoli had to leave the game with a concussion, and Sophomore Nathan Stanley took over as starter. After two Cajun touchdowns, the Rebels closed the game with 16 consecutive points and earned a 43–21 victory. The victory was the fourth win of the season for the Rebels and brought their record to 4–5. Ole Miss rushed for a season high 298 rushing yards in the win. Brandon Bolden and Enrique Davis both ran for 100 yards, and Bolden finished the game with over 200 total yards and three touchdowns.

=== Tennessee ===
Team	1	2	3	4	Total
Mississippi	0	14	0	0	14
• Tennessee	21	10	14	7	52

- Location: Knoxville, Tennessee
- Game start: 12:00 p.m.
- Television network: CBS

== Roster ==
2010 Ole Miss Rebels football team roster
Players
Coaches
Offense

Pos.	#	Name	Class
QB	1	Randall Mackey	Jr
RB	2	Rodney Scott	So
RB	3	Jeff Scott	Fr
RB	4	Nicholas Parker	Fr
WR	5	Melvin Harris	So
QB	7	Parks Frazier	Fr
QB	8	Jeremiah Masoli	Sr
QB	9	Robert Ratliff	So
WR	10	Jesse Grandy	So
WR	11	Vincent Sanders	Fr
QB	12	Nathan Stanley	So
QB	13	Witt Haggard	Fr
WR	13	Alex Williams	RFr
WR	16	Markeith Summers	Sr
QB	19	Evan Ingram	Fr
WR	20	Brian Morris	So
WR	21	Lionel Breaux	Sr
RB	23	Houston Keyes	Fr
WR	26	Derrick Herman	Jr
RB	27	Enrique Davis	Jr
WR	28	Korvic Neat	RFr
RB	29	Devin Thomas	So
FB	30	Derrick Davis	Sr
TE	32	Reggie Hicks	Sr
FB	33	E.J. Epperson	So
RB	34	Brandon Bolden	Jr
FB	35	Earnest Harmon	Fr
WR	37	Matt Tarpley	RFr
RB	44	Martez Eastland	Fr
FB	45	H.R. Greer	So
RB	47	Tim Simon	So
FB	48	Justin Bigham	RFr
FB	49	Brandon Keel	Fr
C	56	Evan Swindall	Fr
OT	57	Terrell Brown	So
OL	59	Will Denny	Fr
OL	60	Josh Tatum	So
OL	61	Zack Brent	Jr
OL	62	Michael Brown	RFr
C	65	Chase Hughes	Fr
OL	67	Chris Gill	RFr
OL	68	Tyler McCain	Jr
OL	70	Emmanuel McCray	RFr
OL	71	Logan Clair	RJr
OL	72	Terrence Hackney	Fr
OL	73	Alex Washington	Jr
OL	74	Jared Duke	Fr
OL	75	Matt Hall	So
OL	76	A.J. Hawkins	So
OL	77	Patrick Junen	Fr
OL	78	Bradley Sowell	Jr
OL	79	Bobby Massie	So
WR	80	Nick Sabert	Fr
WR	82	Vincent Moss	Jr
TE	83	Ferbia Allen	So
WR	83	Jordan Holder	RFr
WR	84	Richie Contartesi	Sr
TE	84	Jack Nuismer	RFr
TE	85	Layton Jones	Jr
WR	85	Ja-Mes Logan	RFr
WR	86	Ben Walker	Fr
TE	87	John Peloza	Fr
WR	88	Jared Mitchell	So
TE	89	Z. Mason	RFr

Defense

Pos.	#	Name	Class
S	1	Damien Jackson	Jr
DL	2	Delvin Jones	Fr
CB	3	Charles Sawyer	RFr
CB	4	Marcus Temple	Jr
S	5	Frank Crawford	RFr
CB	6	Jeremy McGee	Sr
DE	7	Wayne Dorsey	Jr
S	8	Terrell Grant	RFr
LB	9	Allen Walker	Sr
LB	11	Clarence Jackson	Fr
S	13	Brishen Mathews	Fr
LB	14	Brandon Sanders	So
LB	15	Joel Kight	So
S	17	Jarius Williams	Jr
S	20	Johnny Brown	Sr
S	21	Dele Junaid	RFr
CB	22	Kyle Horine	So
S	23	George Helow	Sr
DB	24	Tony Grimes	Fr
CB	25	De'Shawn Hawkins	Fr
S	27	Sam Noblin	Fr
CB	28	Julian Whitehead	So
LB	31	Rudy Wilson	So
DB	33	Cliff Coleman	Fr
S	35	Fon Ingram	Sr
DE	37	Lekenwic Haynes	So
DE	40	Kentrell Lockett	Sr
LB	42	D.T. Shackelford	So
LB	44	Ralph Williams	Fr
LB	45	Josh Lancaster	So
LB	46	Tyriek Gracia	Fr
LB	49	Will Martin	Fr
LB	51	Jonathan Cornell	Sr
LB	52	Mike Marry	Fr
DE	53	Jason Jones	So
DE	54	Walker Sturgeon	Fr
DL	54	Carlos Thompson	Fr
DE	55	Cameron Whigham	Fr
LB	56	Nick Eley	RFr
DT	57	Jerrell Powe	Sr
DT	58	Corey Gaines	RFr
DL	87	Alan-Michael Thomas	Fr
DE	90	Gerald Rivers	So
DL	92	Carlton Martin	Fr
DT	93	Justin Smith	Jr
DT	94	LaMark Armour	Sr
DL	95	Bryon Bennett	Fr
DT	96	Lawon Scott	Sr
DT	98	Taurus Ward	Jr
DT	99	Ted Laurent	Sr

Special teams

Pos.	#	Name	Class
K	46	David Hankins	Jr
LS	64	Jacob Hickman	RFr
LS	66	Chad Phillips	RFr
LS	69	Wesley Phillips	Sr
K	81	Bryson Rose	So
P	94	Chris Conley	RFr
K	96	Andrew Ritter	So
P	97	Tyler Campbell	So

Head coach

- Houston Nutt

Coordinators/assistant coaches

- Kim Dameron – Assistant Coach/Safeties
- Ron Dickerson – Assistant Coach/Wide Receivers
- Mike Markuson – Assistant Coach/Co-Off. Coordinator/Offensive Line
- Derrick Nix – Assistant Coach/Running Backs
- Tyrone Nix – Assistant Head Coach/Def. Coordinator/Linebackers
- Terry Price – Assistant Coach/Defensive Line
- Dave Rader – Assistant Coach/Co-Off. Coordinator/Quarterbacks
- James Shibest – Assistant Coach/Special Teams Coordinator/Tight Ends
- Chris Vaughn – Assistant Coach/Recruiting Coordinator/ Cornerbacks
- Lanier Goethie – Graduate Assistant Coach
- Clark Irwin – Graduate Assistant Coach
- Mike Beaumont – Assistant Athletics Director for Football Operations
- Don Decker – Head Football Strength Coach
- Clifton Ealy – Assistant Athletics Director for Community Relations
- Danny Nutt – Assistant Athletics Director for Player Development
- David Saunders – Administrative Operations Coordinator
- Larandust Coleman – Assistant Athletic Trainer
- Andy Commer – Coordinator of Video Services
- Ken Crain – Equipment Manager
- Tim Mullins – Head Athletic Trainer
- Jared Plummer – Assistant Athletic Trainer

Legend

- (C) Team captain
- (S) Suspended
- (I) Ineligible
- Injured
- Redshirt

Roster
