= Justin Hunter =

American football player (born 1991)

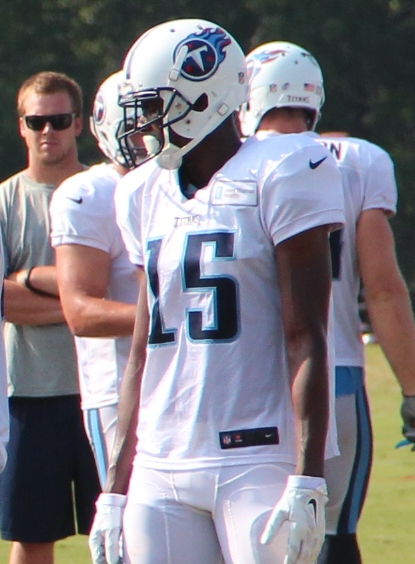
- Hunter with the Tennessee Titans in 2014

No. 15, 17, 11
- Position: Wide receiver

Personal information
- Born: May 20, 1991 (age 35); Virginia Beach, Virginia, U.S.
- Listed height: 6 ft 4 in (1.93 m)
- Listed weight: 203 lb (92 kg)

Career information
- High school: Ocean Lakes (Virginia Beach)
- College: Tennessee (2010–2012)
- NFL draft: 2013: 2nd round, 34th overall pick

Career history
- Tennessee Titans (2013–2015); Miami Dolphins (2016); Buffalo Bills (2016); Pittsburgh Steelers (2017–2018)

Awards and highlights
- Second-team All-SEC (2012)

Career NFL statistics
- Receptions: 85
- Receiving yards: 1,349
- Receiving touchdowns: 13
- Stats at Pro Football Reference

Justin Scott Parker Hunter (born May 20, 1991) is an American former professional football player who was a wide receiver in the National Football League (NFL). He played college football for the Tennessee Volunteers. Hunter was selected by the Tennessee Titans in the second round of the 2013 NFL draft.

Hunter spent three seasons with the Titans before being released prior to the 2016 season. During the 2016 regular season, Hunter played in one game with the Miami Dolphins before spending most of the season with the Buffalo Bills. He then spent the next two seasons with the Pittsburgh Steelers.

Hunter is a world-class long jumper, and represented the United States at the 2010 IAAF World Junior Championships.

== Early life ==
Hunter was born in Virginia Beach, Virginia. He attended Ocean Lakes High School in Virginia Beach where he played football and basketball and ran track for the Ocean Lakes Dolphins. As a junior in 2008, he caught 34 passes for 545 yards and 13 touchdowns. As a senior in 2009, he caught 46 passes for 714 yards and nine touchdowns. He was ranked as the eighth best wide receiver recruit and 75th best overall prospect in his class by Rivals.com.

As a track and field athlete, Hunter was an accomplished jumper. He was ranked by Track & Field News as the third best long jumper, seventh best high jumper and fourteenth best triple jumper. He won Virginia state titles in long jump and high jump and settled for second place in the triple jump. His best long jump, 25'10¾", qualified him for the IAAF World Junior Championships in Athletics.

== College career ==
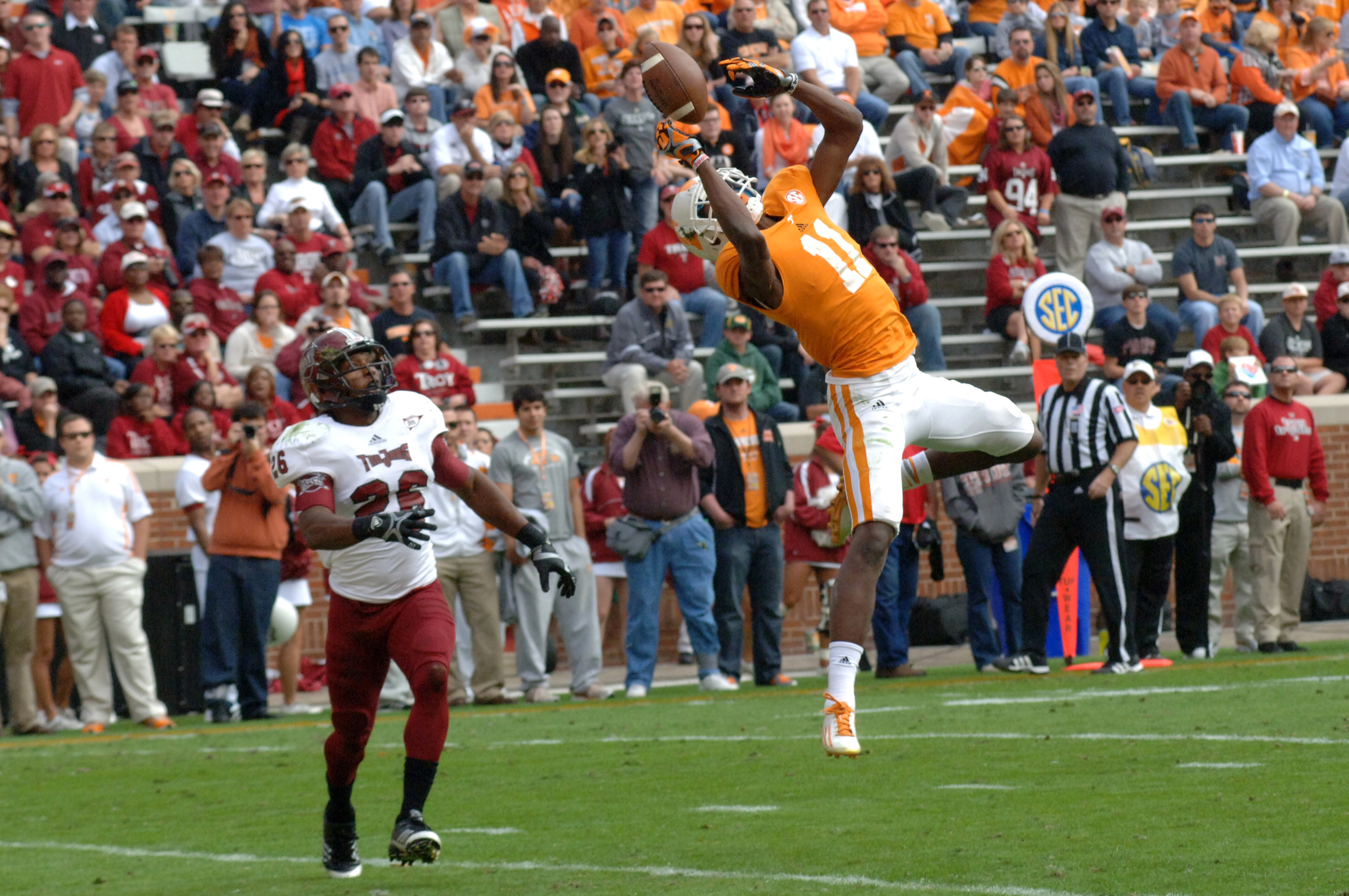
Hunter catching a pass in 2012

Hunter enrolled in the University of Tennessee, where he played for the Tennessee Volunteers football team from 2010 to 2012 and competed for one season on Tennessee's track and field team. As a true freshman in 2010, Hunter started two of 13 games and had 16 receptions for 415 yards and seven touchdowns, averaging a team-leading 25.9 yards per catch. His first touchdown reception was a 35-yard reception that came on a fourth-down play against Florida. Coming off the bench against Georgia, he caught four passes for 110 yards. In his second career start against the Ole Miss Rebels, he caught three passes for 114 yards, including an 80-yard touchdown. He was named to the Coaches' All-SEC Freshman Team.

In track and field, Hunter set a Tennessee freshman record with a long jump measuring 26'1½". He was named a First-team All-American by the U.S. Track & Field and Cross Country Coaches Association in the event and was also named to the SEC Indoor All-Freshman Team.

Hunter started the first three games of his sophomore season in 2011 before tearing his ACL on his first catch in the game against Florida, which caused him to miss the rest of the season. The injury also forced him to quit competing in track and field after one season. For his limited season, he had 17 receptions for 314 yards with two touchdowns. He caught 6 passes for 146 yards, including an 81-yard touchdown, against Montana in the first game of the season. Against Cincinnati, he caught 10 passes for 156 yards and a touchdown. At the time of his injury, he was leading the SEC in receptions per game and receiving yards per game.

Hunter started all 12 games in the 2012 season, and caught 73 passes for 1,083 yards and nine touchdowns. He was third in the SEC in both total receiving yards and receiving yards per game. His total of 73 catches was the second-highest in school history for a single season (Marcus Nash had 76 in 1997). In the season-opener against N.C. State, he had nine catches for 73 yards. Against Missouri, he caught nine passes for 181 yards, his eighth career game with more than 100 yards receiving. After the 2012 season, he was named to the Coaches' All-SEC Second-team.

On January 9, 2013, Hunter, along with college teammates Cordarrelle Patterson, Tyler Bray, and Darrington Sentimore, announced his intention to leave college early and declare for the 2013 NFL draft.

=== Statistics ===
Season	Team	GP	Receiving			
Season	Team	GP	Rec	Yds	Avg	TD
2010	Tennessee	13	16	415	25.9	7
2011	Tennessee	3	17	314	18.5	2
2012	Tennessee	12	73	1,083	14.8	9
Career		28	106	1,812	17.1	18

== Professional career ==
=== Pre-draft ===
Coming out of Tennessee, Hunter was projected by the majority of NFL analysts and scouts to be a first or second-round pick. He received an invitation to the NFL Combine and completed all the required drills except for the three-cone and bench press due to a shoulder and calf injury. On March 20, 2013, he participated at Tennessee's pro day and performed the broad jump, three-cone drill, and vertical for scouts and representatives. Representatives from all 32 NFL teams attended including the Pittsburgh Steeler's head coach Mike Tomlin and offensive coordinator Todd Haley to scout Justin Hunter, Cordarrelle Patterson, Tyler Bray, and eight other prospects. He was ranked as the second best wide receiver prospect available in the draft by NFLDraftScout.com and the third best wide receiver by NFL analyst Mike Mayock.

Pre-draft measurables
Height	Weight	Arm length	Hand span	40-yard dash	10-yard split	20-yard split	20-yard shuttle	Three-cone drill	Vertical jump	Broad jump
6 ft 4 in (1.93 m)	196 lb (89 kg)	33 1/4 in (0.84 m)	9 3/8 in (0.24 m)	4.44 s	1.58 s	2.59 s	4.33 s	7.19 s	40.5 in (1.03 m)	11 ft 6 in (3.51 m)

=== Tennessee Titans ===
==== 2013 ====
The Tennessee Titans selected Hunter in the second round (34th overall) of the 2013 NFL draft. He was the fourth wide receiver selected in the 2013 NFL draft.

On June 13, 2013, the Titans signed Hunter to a four-year, $5.42 million contract with $3.43 million guaranteed and a signing bonus of $2.32 million.

Hunter entered the regular season as the Tennessee Titan's fourth wide receiver on their depth chart, behind veterans Kenny Britt, Nate Washington, and Kendall Wright.

On September 22, 2013, he recorded his first career NFL reception on a 34-yard touchdown pass from Jake Locker that was the game-winning score in a 20–17 win over San Diego Chargers. He caught his second career pass for a 16-yard touchdown against the New York Jets the following week. On November 24, 2013, Hunter caught a season-high six passes for 109 receiving yards, and a 54-yard touchdown during a 23–19 victory over the Oakland Raiders. During a Week 14 matchup against the Denver Broncos, Hunter caught four passes for 114-yards and a touchdown in a 28–51 loss. He finished his rookie season with a total of 18 receptions for 354 receiving yards and four touchdowns in 14 games as the Tennessee Titans finished with a 7–9 record.

==== 2014 ====
Hunter entered training camp in 2014 competing with Marc Mariani and Dexter McCluster to be the Tennessee Titan's third wide receiver on their depth chart. Head coach Ken Whisenhunt named him the third wide receiver to begin the regular season, behind Kendall Wright and Nate Washington.

On October 5, 2014, Hunter made his first career start and caught three passes for a season-high 99 receiving yards and scored his first touchdown of the year on a 75-yard pass from Charlie Whitehurst. The Tennessee Titans went on to lose 29–28 to the Cleveland Browns During a Week 8 matchup against the Houston Texans, he caught a season-high four passes for 31 receiving yards and scored on a 12-yard touchdown pass from Zach Mettenberger, as the Titans were defeated 16–30.

On November 30, 2014, Hunter suffered a lacerated spleen on the first play of a 45–22 loss to the Houston Texans. He was hit by Texan's safety Danieal Manning and the pass was intercepted by Johnathan Joseph. The injury caused him to miss the remainder of the season.

He finished his second season with a total of 28 receptions, 498 receiving yards, and three touchdowns in eight starts and 12 games as the Tennessee Titans finished the season 2–14 in their first season under Ken Whisenhunt.

==== 2015 ====
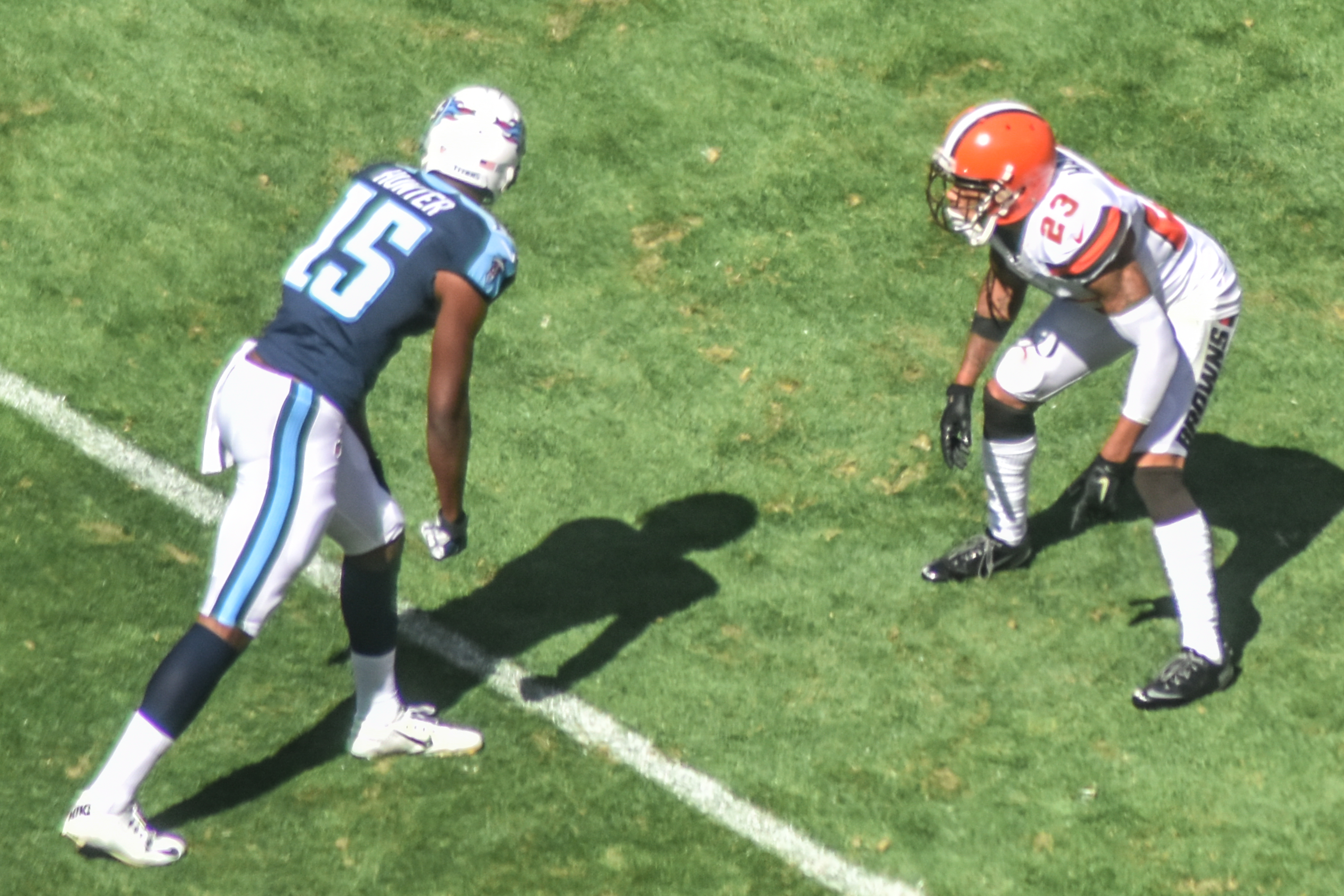
Hunter (left) being covered by Joe Haden in 2015

Throughout training camp in 2015, Hunter faced stiff competition for the vacant starting wide receiver position left by Nate Washington. He lost the job to veteran Harry Douglas and was named the third wide receiver on the depth chart ahead of Hakeem Nicks, Jacoby Ford, and rookie Dorial Green-Beckham.

On October 18, 2015, he caught three passes for a season-high 54 receiving yards during a 38–10 loss to the Miami Dolphins. During a Week 9 victory over the New Orleans Saints, Hunter caught his only touchdown of the season on an eight-yard pass from rookie Marcus Mariota. He finished the 34–28 overtime victory with three receptions, 17 receiving yards, and a touchdown. The following week, he caught a season-high four passes for 47 receiving yards, but had to leave after suffering an apparent ankle injury during a 27–10 loss to the Carolina Panthers.

On Monday, November 16, 2015, Hunter was added to the season-ending injury reserve list after having surgery the day before to repair a fractured ankle suffered previous game against the Panthers.

==== 2016 ====
After returning from a fractured ankle, Hunter entered training camp competing to be the Titans third option at wide receiver with Dorial Green-Beckham and Andre Johnson.

The Titans waived Hunter on September 2, 2016.

=== Miami Dolphins ===
The Miami Dolphins claimed Hunter off waivers on September 4, 2016. On September 11, 2016, he appeared in his only game with Miami, as they lost 12–10 to the Seattle Seahawks.

On September 15, 2016, he agreed to take a $387,389 pay cut in order to stay with the Dolphins. He was released by the team on September 28, 2016.

=== Buffalo Bills ===
Hunter was claimed off waivers by the Buffalo Bills after Sammy Watkins was placed on injured reserve on September 30, 2016.

Rex Ryan named him the team's fifth wide receiver on their depth chart behind Robert Woods, Marquise Goodwin, Greg Salas, and Walter Powell. Hunter made his Buffalo Bills debut on October 9, 2016, against the Los Angeles Rams and caught a four-yard touchdown pass from Tyrod Taylor. The following week, he made his second reception and scored a touchdown on a 30-yard reception from Tyrod Taylor as the Bills went on to defeat the San Francisco 49ers 45–16. On November 27, 2016, Hunter caught a game-winning 16-yard touchdown pass from Bills quarterback Tyrod Taylor and helped the Bills defeat the Jacksonville Jaguars 28–21.

He finished his only season with the Buffalo Bills with a total of ten receptions, 189 receiving yards, and four touchdown receptions in 12 games and five starts.

=== Pittsburgh Steelers ===
==== 2017 ====
On March 15, 2017, the Pittsburgh Steelers signed Hunter to a one-year, $855,000 contract that includes a signing bonus of $30,000.

Hunter entered Steelers training camp competing for a backup wide receiver position against Sammie Coates, JuJu Smith-Schuster, Cobi Hamilton, Demarcus Ayers, Eli Rogers, and Darrius Heyward-Bey. He was named the sixth wide receiver to begin the regular season, behind Antonio Brown, Martavis Bryant, Heyward-Bey, Smith-Schuster, and Rogers.

Hunter was a healthy scratch for the first three regular season games. On October 1, 2017, in Week 4, Hunter made his official Steelers regular season debut and finished a 26–9 victory over the Baltimore Ravens with one reception for five yards. On December 25, 2017, Hunter caught his first touchdown as a member of the Steelers on a five-yard pass by quarterback Ben Roethlisberger in their 34–6 win against the Houston Texans.

==== 2018 ====
On April 5, 2018, the Steelers signed Hunter to a one-year, $870,000 contract with a signing bonus of $30,000. He played in five games, recording three catches for 21 yards before suffering a shoulder injury in Week 13. He was placed on injured reserve on December 4, 2018.

== Personal life ==
On July 20, 2015, Hunter turned himself in to the Virginia Beach police department following a large bar fight which occurred on July 3 in Virginia Beach. He was arrested and held without bond. He was later found not guilty of misdemeanor assault and battery on September 15, 2015. On January 28, 2017, Hunter and his long-term girlfriend, with whom he has three children, became engaged.
