= 2010 Auburn Tigers football team =

American college football season

2010 Auburn Tigers football

Consensus national champion SEC champion SEC Western Division champion

SEC Championship Game, W 56–17 vs. South Carolina

BCS National Championship Game, W 22–19 vs. Oregon
- Conference: Southeastern Conference
- Western Division

Ranking
- Coaches: No. 1
- AP: No. 1
- Record: 14–0 (8–0 SEC)
- Head coach: Gene Chizik (2nd season)
- Offensive coordinator: Gus Malzahn (2nd season)
- Offensive scheme: Spread option, Play Action / Read
- Defensive coordinator: Ted Roof (2nd season)
- Base defense: 4–3, Tampa 2
- Captains: Kodi Burns; Josh Bynes; Zac Etheridge; Lee Ziemba
- Home stadium: Jordan–Hare Stadium

2010 Southeastern Conference football standings
| | Conf. | | | Overall |
| Team | W | | L | W | | L |
|---|---|---|---|---|---|---|
Eastern Division
| No. 22 South Carolina x | 5 | – | 3 | 9 | – | 5 |
| Florida | 4 | – | 4 | 8 | – | 5 |
| Georgia | 3 | – | 5 | 6 | – | 7 |
| Tennessee | 3 | – | 5 | 6 | – | 7 |
| Kentucky | 2 | – | 6 | 6 | – | 7 |
| Vanderbilt | 1 | – | 7 | 2 | – | 10 |
Western Division
| No. 1 Auburn x$# | 8 | – | 0 | 14 | – | 0 |
| No. 12 Arkansas % | 6 | – | 2 | 10 | – | 3 |
| No. 8 LSU | 6 | – | 2 | 11 | – | 2 |
| No. 10 Alabama | 5 | – | 3 | 10 | – | 3 |
| No. 15 Mississippi State | 4 | – | 4 | 9 | – | 4 |
| Ole Miss* | 1 | – | 7 | 4 | – | 8 |
Championship: Auburn 56, South Carolina 17
# – BCS National Champion; $ – BCS representative as conference champion; % – BCS at-large representative; x – Division champion/co-champions; * Ole Miss vacated all wins due to NCAA violations.; Rankings from AP Poll

The 2010 Auburn Tigers football team represented Auburn University in the 2010 NCAA Division I FBS football season. The Tigers, led by second-year head coach Gene Chizik were members of the Western Division of the Southeastern Conference and played their home games at Jordan–Hare Stadium. The Tigers completed a 12–0 regular season record and defeated South Carolina in the 2010 SEC Championship Game.

On January 10, 2011, Auburn defeated Oregon in the BCS National Championship Game in Glendale, Arizona, 22–19, to win the 9th national championship in school history and first since 2004.

The Tigers were led on offense by junior quarterback Cam Newton, who became the third Auburn player to win the Heisman Trophy, distinguishing him as the best player in college football. Newton led the nation in touchdowns responsible for, finishing with 30 passing touchdowns, 20 rushing touchdowns, and one receiving touchdown for a total of 51. He also led the Southeastern Conference in total yards and passing efficiency rating. Newton declared for the NFL draft following the season, and was drafted 1st overall in 2011.

== Defensive and offensive strategies ==
In the second year of the Chizik era of Auburn football, offensive coordinator Gus Malzahn continued use of his hurry-up no-huddle schemes. This offense relies on an attacking ground game from different spread sets, using fakes and misdirection, to set up a play action passing attack through the air, while snapping the ball almost as soon as it is placed to give the defense less time to react to different looks. Defensive coordinator Ted Roof's efforts were aided by replenished depth at the linebacker and secondary positions, utilizing a collection of the 3–4 and 4–3 defensive formations, also known as Multiple D strategy.

Eventual Heisman Trophy winning quarterback Cam Newton led the Tiger offense to a 13–0 record, SEC Championship, and a berth in the BCS Championship game, which was played on January 10, 2011. Auburn led the SEC in scoring offense, total offense, rushing offense, pass efficiency, first downs and first down conversions. Defensively the Tigers were improved from 2009 but less impressive than on offense, ranking in the lower half of the SEC for most defensive categories. However, the Tiger defense was notably improved in the second halves of its 2010 games, allowing an average of only 3.7 fourth-quarter points and shutting out five opponents (Mississippi State, South Carolina, Louisiana-Monroe, Georgia and Alabama) in the final period.

== Schedule ==
| Date | Time | Opponent | Rank | Site | TV | Result | Attendance |
|---|---|---|---|---|---|---|---|
| September 4 | 6:00 p.m. | Arkansas State* | No. 23 | Jordan–Hare Stadium; Auburn, AL | SECRN | W 52–26 | 83,441 |
| September 9 | 6:30 p.m. | at Mississippi State | No. 21 | Davis Wade Stadium; Starkville, MS | ESPN | W 17–14 | 54,806 |
| September 18 | 6:00 p.m. | Clemson* | No. 16 | Jordan–Hare Stadium; Auburn, AL (rivalry) (College GameDay) | ESPN | W 27–24 ^{OT} | 87,451 |
| September 25 | 6:30 p.m. | No. 12 South Carolina | No. 17 | Jordan–Hare Stadium; Auburn, AL | ESPN | W 35–27 | 87,451 |
| October 2 | 11:00 a.m. | Louisiana–Monroe* | No. 10 | Jordan–Hare Stadium; Auburn, AL | ESPNU | W 52–3 | 80,759 |
| October 9 | 6:30 p.m. | at Kentucky | No. 8 | Commonwealth Stadium; Lexington, KY | ESPN2 | W 37–34 | 70,776 |
| October 16 | 2:30 p.m. | No. 12 Arkansas | No. 7 | Jordan–Hare Stadium; Auburn, AL | CBS | W 65–43 | 87,451 |
| October 23 | 2:30 p.m. | No. 6 LSU | No. 5 | Jordan–Hare Stadium; Auburn, AL (Tiger Bowl) | CBS | W 24–17 | 87,451 |
| October 30 | 5:00 p.m. | at Ole Miss | No. 3 | Vaught–Hemingway Stadium; Oxford, MS (rivalry) | ESPN2 | W 51–31 | 61,474 |
| November 6 | 12:00 p.m. | Chattanooga*^{†} | No. 3 | Jordan–Hare Stadium; Auburn, AL | PPV | W 62–24 | 87,451 |
| November 13 | 2:30 p.m. | Georgia | No. 2 | Jordan–Hare Stadium; Auburn, AL (Deep South's Oldest Rivalry) | CBS | W 49–31 | 87,451 |
| November 26 | 1:30 p.m. | at No. 11 Alabama | No. 2 | Bryant–Denny Stadium; Tuscaloosa, AL (Iron Bowl) | CBS | W 28–27 | 101,821 |
| December 4 | 3:00 p.m. | vs. No. 19 South Carolina | No. 2 | Georgia Dome; Atlanta, GA (SEC Championship Game) | CBS | W 56–17 | 75,802 |
| January 10, 2011 | 7:30 p.m. | vs. No. 2 Oregon* | No. 1 | University of Phoenix Stadium; Glendale, AZ (BCS National Championship Game) (College GameDay) | ESPN | W 22–19 | 78,603 |
*Non-conference game; ^{†}Homecoming; Rankings from AP Poll released prior to the game; All times are in Central time

Schedule source: 2010 Auburn Tigers football schedule

== Personnel ==
=== Coaching staff ===
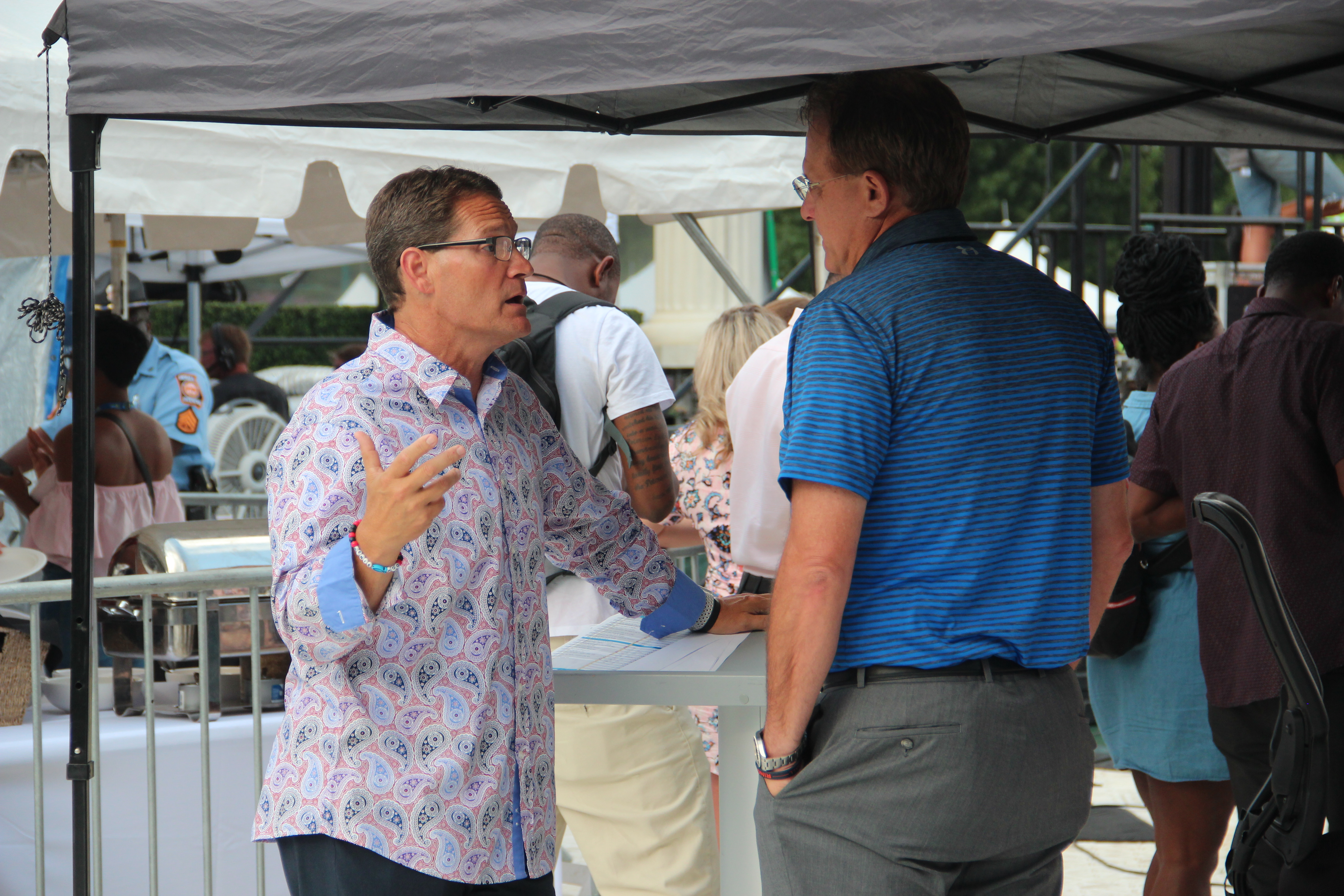
Two members of the 2010 Auburn coaching staff: Gene Chizik (left) and Gus Malzahn (right) (pictured in 2018)

2010 Auburn Tigers coaching staff
| Head coaches: Head coach – Gene Chizik; Ass. HC for Offense/OC/QB – Gus Malzahn; Ass. HC/WR – Trooper Taylor; Offensive coaches: Offensive line: Jeff Grimes; Running backs/Recruiting Coordinator: Curtis Luper; Quality Control: Casey Woods; Defensive coaches: Defensive coordinator/Linebackers: Ted Roof; Defensive Line: Tracy Rocker; Cornerbacks: Phillip Lolley; Safeties: Tommy Thigpen | Special teams: Special teams coordinator/tight ends – Jay Boulware; Supporting Strength and Conditioning coach: S&C Support – Kevin Yoxall |

=== Depth chart ===
Defense

FS
Zac Etheridge
Aairon Savage
Drew Cole

| WLB | MLB | SLB |
|---|---|---|
| ⋅ | Josh Bynes | ⋅ |
| Jessel Curry | Jake Holland | ⋅ |
| Jawara White | Harris Gaston | ⋅ |

SS
Mike McNeil
Aairon Savage
Ryan Smith

CB
Demond Washington
T'Sharvan Bell
Ryan White

| DE | DT | DT | DE |
|---|---|---|---|
| Nosa Eguae | Zach Clayton | Nick Fairley | Antoine Carter |
| Michael Goggans | Jeffery Whitaker | Mike Blanc | Corey Lemonier |
| Craig Sanders | Derrick Lykes | Derrick Lykes | Dee Ford |

CB
Neiko Thorpe
Chris Davis
Ryan White

Offense

WR
Terrell Zachary
Quindarius Carr
Jay Wisner

WR
Kodi Burns
Emory Blake
Jay Wisner

| LT | LG | C | RG | RT |
|---|---|---|---|---|
| Lee Ziemba | Mike Berry | Ryan Pugh | Byron Isom | Brandon Mosley |
| Brandon Mosley | Bart Eddins | Blake Burgess | Jorell Bostrom | John Sullen |
| AJ Greene | Jared Cooper | Jared Cooper | Jared Cooper | ⋅ |

TE
Philip Lutzenkirchen
Eric Smith
Blake Burgess

WR
Darvin Adams
DeAngelo Benton
Trovon Reed

QB
Cam Newton
Neil Caudle
Barrett Trotter

RB
Michael Dyer
Onterio McCalebb
Mario Fannin

Special teams
PK Wes Byrum
PK Cody Parkey
P Ryan Shoemaker
P Steven Clarke
KR Onterio McCalebb
PR Demond Washington
LS Josh Harris
H Neil Caudle

=== Game summaries ===
==== Arkansas State ====
Arkansas State at Auburn

| Team | 1 | 2 | 3 | 4 | Total |
|---|---|---|---|---|---|
| Arkansas State | 6 | 10 | 7 | 3 | 26 |
| • #22 Auburn | 14 | 21 | 10 | 7 | 52 |

- Location: Auburn, Alabama
- Game start: 6:08 p.m.
- Elapsed time: 3:30
- Game attendance: 83,441
- Game weather: 84°, Clear
- Referee: Ken Williamson
- TV announcers (SECRN): Bob Rathbun (play-by-play), Tim Couch (color), Jenn Hildreth (sidelines)

Auburn came into the season against an Arkansas State team ready to show off their new spread offense. Although Auburn only surrendered 43 yards on the ground, a total of 366 yards offensively were given up by a soft Auburn defense. Arkansas State quarterback Ryan Aplin threw for 278 yards while completing 28 of 42 passes. However, Auburn's offense shined despite very basic playcalling. New quarterback Cam Newton set a school record for quarterbacks running the ball with 171 yards on the ground, as well as 186 yards passing, while completing 9 of 14 passes. Also, true freshman running back Michael Dyer ran 14 times for 95 yards in an impressive college debut.

==== Mississippi State ====
Auburn at Mississippi State

| Team | 1 | 2 | 3 | 4 | Total |
|---|---|---|---|---|---|
| • #21 Auburn | 7 | 10 | 0 | 0 | 17 |
| Mississippi State | 7 | 0 | 7 | 0 | 14 |

- Location: Starkville, Mississippi
- Game start: 6:45 p.m.
- Elapsed time: 3:10
- Game attendance: 54,806
- Game weather: 89°, partly cloudy skies
- Referee: Matt Austin
- TV announcers (ESPN): Rece Davis (play-by-play), Craig James & Jesse Palmer (color), Jenn Brown (sidelines)

Auburn traveled to Starkville to kick off the SEC season with a Thursday night tilt with the Bulldogs. In a back-and-forth game, the Tigers pulled out a 17–14 victory when State's late attempt to tie or perhaps win the game failed. Cam Newton followed up his debut by going 11/19 for 138 yards and two passing TDs. He also showed off his running ability once again by gaining 70 yards on the ground on 18 carries. Newton was Auburn's leading rusher for the second straight week. Sophomore Onterio McCalebb added 68 yards for the Tigers. The Auburn defense looked much improved from their week one game with Arkansas State and kept the Bulldogs in check most of the night. DT Nick Fairley led the charge on defense. He recovered a fumble, intercepted a pass, and had 1 1/2 sacks. Fairley was rewarded for his performance by being named SEC Defensive Player of the Week.

==== Clemson ====
Clemson at Auburn

| Team | 1 | 2 | 3 | 4 | OT | Total |
|---|---|---|---|---|---|---|
| Clemson | 7 | 10 | 0 | 7 | 0 | 24 |
| • #16 Auburn | 0 | 3 | 21 | 0 | 3 | 27 |

- Location: Auburn, Alabama
- Game start: 6:06 p.m.
- Elapsed time: 3:52
- Game attendance: 87,451
- Game weather: 93°, Fair
- Referee: Tom Zimorski
- TV announcers (ESPN): Brent Musburger (play-by-play), Kirk Herbstreit (color), Erin Andrews (sidelines)

It was a battle of the Tigers at Jordan–Hare Stadium as Auburn hosted Clemson. This game was the site of ESPN's College GameDay and lived up to the hype. Early it looked as if Clemson was going to blow Auburn out of its own building as the visiting Tigers stormed out to a 17–0 lead. Auburn rallied to get a FG before half time and then showed no ill effects of the 1st half in scoring three 3rd-quarter touchdowns to take a 24–17 lead. Clemson rallied for a TD of their own and this game ended up going to overtime. Auburn managed only a FG on their OT possession and it looked as if Clemson had tied the game with a FG of their own, but a procedure penalty ended up costing the visiting Tigers big time. Clemson missed the second FG attempt and Auburn had survived another heart stopping game, 27–24. Cam Newton bounced back after a horrible first half and finished the night 7/14 for 203 yards with 2 TD's and 2 INT's. Onterio McCalebb was big in the running game again for Auburn, gaining 81 yards on 10 carries. Freshman Michael Dyer added 69 yards on 16 carries. Darvin Adams finally had a breakout game, catching 5 balls for 118 yards and a TD. Philip Lutzenkirchen and Terrell Zachery caught the other TDs, with Zachery's on a long 78-yard pass play.

==== South Carolina ====
South Carolina at Auburn

| Team | 1 | 2 | 3 | 4 | Total |
|---|---|---|---|---|---|
| #15 South Carolina | 14 | 6 | 7 | 0 | 27 |
| • #17 Auburn | 7 | 7 | 7 | 14 | 35 |

- Location: Auburn, Alabama
- Game start: 6:47 p.m.
- Elapsed time: 3:21
- Game attendance: 87,451
- Game weather: 86°, Partly Cloudy
- Referee: Tom Ritter
- TV announcers (ESPN): Brad Nessler (play-by-play), Todd Blackledge (color), Holly Rowe (sidelines)

For the third straight week, the Auburn Tigers had a game go down to the wire; and for the third straight week, the Tigers came out on the right side of a close battle. The Tigers improved to 4–0, notching their 700th win all-time, after defeating the South Carolina Gamecocks. Cam Newton proved once again just how special a player he is by accounting for all five Auburn TD's. Newton threw for 2 and ran for the other 3 while accounting for 334 yards of total offense. Freshman Michael Dyer gained 100 yards on 23 carries. Stephen Garcia played well but two fumbles led to Steve Spurrier pulling Garcia in favor of freshman Connor Shaw. Shaw threw INT's on each of his possessions and the Tigers once again survived. The Auburn defense played better against the run, but South Carolina still threw the ball pretty much at will. Alshon Jeffery had 8 catches for 192 yards and 2 TD's.

==== Louisiana–Monroe ====
Louisiana–Monroe at Auburn

| Team | 1 | 2 | 3 | 4 | Total |
|---|---|---|---|---|---|
| Louisiana–Monroe | 3 | 0 | 0 | 0 | 3 |
| • #10 Auburn | 17 | 14 | 7 | 14 | 52 |

- Location: Auburn, Alabama
- Game start: 11:01 a.m.
- Elapsed time: 2:56
- Game attendance: 80,759
- Game weather: 70°, Sunny
- Referee: Matt Austin
- TV announcers (ESPNU): Clay Matvick (play-by-play), Herm Edwards (color), Elizabeth Moreau (sidelines)

Auburn scored 31 points on their first five possessions of the game en route to an easy victory over the Warhawks of Louisiana–Monroe. The Tigers went ahead 7–0 on their second play from scrimmage on a 50-yard touchdown run by sophomore tailback Onterrio McCalebb and the ensuing PAT by Wes Byrum. Junior quarterback Cam Newton connected on 94-yard pass touchdown pass completion to wide receiver Emory Blake on the Tigers' fourth play from scrimmage, making the score 14–0 with 10:22 remaining in the opening period, and the rout was on. Unlike the previous four games, Newton had no rushing attempts except for a 4-yard loss on a quarterback sack, but he completed 14 of 19 passes for 249 yards. Mario Fannin led the Tigers' rushing attack with 89 yards on 10 attempts. The Tigers offense totalled 505 yards as they improved their record to 5–0.

==== Kentucky ====
Auburn at Kentucky

| Team | 1 | 2 | 3 | 4 | Total |
|---|---|---|---|---|---|
| • #8 Auburn | 14 | 17 | 0 | 6 | 37 |
| Kentucky | 7 | 10 | 14 | 3 | 34 |

- Location: Lexington, Kentucky
- Game start: 6:37 p.m.
- Elapsed time: 3:12
- Game attendance: 70,776
- Game weather: 79°, Fair
- Referee: Marc Curles
- TV announcers (ESPN2): Mark Jones (play-by-play), Bob Davie (color), Quint Kessenich (sidelines)

Senior kicker Wes Byrum connected on a 24-yard field goal as time expired to cap a 37–34 victory over the homestanding Kentucky Wildcats. The Tigers offensive attack was once again led by quarterback Cam Newton, who scored four touchdowns in the first half to lead Auburn to a 31–17 halftime lead. Newton contributed 408 yards of offense to the Tigers' attack. He rushed for 198 yards on 28 carries, and completed 13 of 21 passing attempts for 210 yards.

The Wildcats' attacks was led by quarterback Mike Hartline, who completed 23 out of 28 passing attempts for 220 yards, and senior wide receiver Randall Cobb, who rushed for 47 yards, caught seven passes for 68 yards, and threw a 6-yard touchdown pass of his own to freshman tight end Jordan Autmiller. The Tigers' victory avenged a 21–14 defeat they suffered against the Wildcats in 2009—the Wildcats' first victory over Auburn since 1966. With the victory, the Tigers improved their record to 6–0 overall, and 3–0 in the Southeastern Conference, where they moved to a half-game behind Western Division leader LSU. Kentucky fell to 3–3 overall, and 0–3 in the SEC Eastern division.

==== Arkansas ====
Arkansas at Auburn

| Team | 1 | 2 | 3 | 4 | Total |
|---|---|---|---|---|---|
| #12 Arkansas | 7 | 14 | 14 | 8 | 43 |
| • #7 Auburn | 7 | 20 | 10 | 28 | 65 |

- Location: Auburn, Alabama
- Game start: 2:38 p.m.
- Elapsed time: 3:45
- Game attendance: 87,451
- Game weather: 72°; Sunny
- Referee: Penn Wagers
- TV announcers (CBS): Verne Lundquist (play-by-play), Gary Danielson (color), Tracy Wolfson (sidelines)

Arkansas and Auburn combined for 1036 yards of total offense and 108 points in the highest scoring non-overtime game between two conference opponents in SEC history as the Tigers defeated the Razorbacks. The Tigers were once again led on offense by quarterback Cam Newton, who rushed for 188 yards and completed 10 of 14 passes for 140 yards. The much-anticipated duel between Newton and Razorbacks' quarterback Ryan Mallett failed to materialize when Mallett left the game in the 2nd quarter because of a concussion. Mallett was replaced by sophomore backup Tyler Wilson, who completed 25 of 34 passes for 332 yards and four touchdowns. Before Mallett left the game he completed 10 of 15 passes for 95 yards and one touchdown.

The Razorbacks took an early 7–0 lead on 7-yard touchdown pass from Mallett to Van Stumon, but barely two minutes later the Tigers tied the game on 5-yard rushing touchdown by Newton. The two teams combined for 34 points in the second quarter. Auburn scored two touchdowns, one on a 4-yard run by Mario Fannin and the other on 13-yard run by Onterrio McCalebb. Wes Byrum kicked two field goals in the period, including a 26-yarder on the first half's final play to give the Tigers a 27–21 lead.

Wilson, the Razorbacks' back-up quarterback, connected on touchdown passes of 37 and 24 yards in the third quarter, while Byrum kicked a 28-yard field goal and Newton rushed for a 1-yard touchdown, making the score 37–35 in favor of Auburn at the end of the 3rd quarter. Newton's touchdown was set up by a 99-yard kick-off return by McCalebb.

Arkansas went ahead 43–37 less than a minute into the fourth quarter, but Auburn went ahead for good when Newton completed a 15-yard touchdown pass to wide receiver Emory Blake with 11:44 left in the game, making the score 44–43. The Tigers' defense was responsible for their final three touchdowns. Zac Ethridge returned an Arkansas fumble 47 yards for a touchdown. On Arkansas' next possession, linebacker Josh Bynes intercepted a Tyler Wilson pass and returned it to the Arkansas 7-yard line. Two plays later, Newton scored on a three-yard rush, making the score 58–43. Three plays later, Bynes intercepted another pass by Wilson. The Tigers wrapped up the scoring on a 38-yard run by freshman running back Michael Dyer.

==== LSU ====
LSU at Auburn

| Team | 1 | 2 | 3 | 4 | Total |
|---|---|---|---|---|---|
| #6 LSU | 3 | 7 | 0 | 7 | 17 |
| • #4 Auburn | 7 | 3 | 7 | 7 | 24 |

- Location: Auburn, Alabama
- Game start: 2:40 p.m.
- Elapsed time: 3:25
- Game attendance: 87,451
- Game weather: 77°, Sunny
- Referee: Tom Ritter
- TV announcers (CBS): Verne Lundquist (play-by-play), Gary Danielson (color), Tracy Wolfson (sidelines)

Onterrio McCalebb scored a touchdown on a 70-yard run with 5:05 remaining in the game to give Auburn a 24–17 victory over LSU. The Tigers gained 526 yards on offense against the vaunted LSU defense, including 440 yards rushing. Cam Newton scored two touchdowns and rushed for 217 yards and two touchdowns, while Michael Dyer rushed for 100 yards. The Auburn defense, who gave up 566 yards against Arkansas the previous week, held the Bayou Bengals to just 243 yards on offense.

Newton's 217 rushing yards enabled him to eclipse the SEC record for most rushing yards by a quarterback, set by Auburn's Jimmy Sidle in 1963.

==== Ole Miss ====
Auburn at Ole Miss

| Team | 1 | 2 | 3 | 4 | Total |
|---|---|---|---|---|---|
| • #1 Auburn | 14 | 20 | 10 | 7 | 51 |
| Ole Miss | 14 | 3 | 0 | 14 | 31 |

- Location: Oxford, Mississippi
- Game start: 5:00 p.m.
- Elapsed time: 3:20
- Game attendance: 61,474
- Game weather: 68°; Fair
- Referee: Matt Moore
- TV announcers (ESPN2): Mark Jones (play-by-play), Bob Davie (color), Quint Kessenich (sidelines)

Cam Newton was held to only 45 rushing yards on 11 attempts, but he threw for 209 yards and caught a 20-yard touchdown pass from Kodi Burns as Auburn easily defeated Ole Miss 51–31. Freshman tailback Mike Dyer ran for 180 yards and one touchdown and Onterrio McCalebb ran for another 99 yards, including a 68-yard touchdown run as the Tigers improved their record to 9–0 overall and 6–0 in SEC play.

The Tigers, ranked #1 in the BCS standings for the first time ever and carrying their first #1 ranking in a major poll since 1985, scored more points against the Rebels than they had in any of their 34 previous meetings. The win also ended a three-week streak that saw the #1 ranked team in either the wire service polls or the BCS standings lose on the road.

==== Chattanooga ====
Chattanooga at Auburn
(Homecoming game)

| Team | 1 | 2 | 3 | 4 | Total |
|---|---|---|---|---|---|
| Chattanooga | 0 | 14 | 7 | 3 | 24 |
| • #2 Auburn | 27 | 21 | 7 | 7 | 62 |

- Location: Auburn, Alabama
- Game start: 12:05 p.m.
- Elapsed time: 3:05
- Game attendance: 87,451
- Game weather: 48°; Sunny
- Referee: Ken Williamson
- TV announcers (PPV): Andy Burcham (play-by-play), Reggie Slack (color)

Auburn scored 48 points in the first half—one point short of the school record—to coast to an easy Homecoming victory over Chattanooga. Quarterback Cam Newton passed for a career-best 317 yards and threw four touchdown passes, all before halftime as the Tigers improved their record to 10–0.

Auburn totaled 624 yards on offense in defeating the FCS Mocs for the 21st time in as many meetings between the two schools in a series that was first contested in 1925. The Tigers' rushing attack was led by Mario Fannin, who gained 96 yards on 12 carries, and Michael Dyer, who gained 76 yards on just four carries.

==== Georgia ====
Georgia at Auburn

| Team | 1 | 2 | 3 | 4 | Total |
|---|---|---|---|---|---|
| Georgia | 21 | 0 | 10 | 0 | 31 |
| • #2 Auburn | 7 | 14 | 14 | 14 | 49 |

- Location: Auburn, Alabama
- Game start: 2:46 p.m.
- Elapsed time: 3:39
- Game attendance: 87,451
- Game weather: 68°, Sunny
- Referee: Hubert Owens
- TV announcers (CBS): Verne Lundquist (play-by-play), Gary Danielson (color), Tracy Wolfson (sidelines)

In the 114th renewal of the Deep South's Oldest Rivalry, Auburn defeated Georgia 49–31. The Bulldogs led 21–7 at the end of the first quarter thanks to three touchdown passes by redshirt freshman quarterback Aaron Murray, but Auburn fought back to tie the game at 21–21 on an 18-yard touchdown pass from Cam Newton to tight end Philip Lutzenkirchen with 51 seconds remaining in the first half.

The Tigers began the third quarter by recovering an onsides kick. Senior kicker Wes Byrum recovered his own kick at the Auburn 41-yard line. Nine plays later, Onterrio McCalebb rushed two yards for a touchdown, and Auburn went ahead 28–21. It was the first time Auburn had led in the game since the Bulldogs tied the game near the midway point of the first quarter. Auburn's lead was short-lived, as the Bulldogs tied the game at 28–28 six plays later on seven-yard run by Washaun Ealey.

The Tigers went ahead for good on the ensuing drive. The Tigers began at their own 19-yard line, and on the first play from scrimmage, McCalebb rushed for 48 yards to the Georgia 33-yard line. Four successive runs by freshman tailback Michael Dyer and a one-yard run by Newton gave the Tigers a first and goal opportunity at the Bulldogs 4-yard line. McCalebb scored his third touchdown of the day, and the Tigers went ahead 35–31. The Bulldogs finished their scoring for the day on 28-yard field goal on the final play of the third quarter, but the Tigers added two more touchdowns in the fourth quarter.

As it had been throughout much of the season, the Auburn offense was led by quarterback Cam Newton. He passed for 148 yards and rushed for 151 yards. The Tigers' victory ended a four-game losing streak against the Bulldogs.

==== Alabama ====
Auburn at Alabama

| Team | 1 | 2 | 3 | 4 | Total |
|---|---|---|---|---|---|
| • #2 Auburn | 0 | 7 | 14 | 7 | 28 |
| #9 Alabama | 21 | 3 | 3 | 0 | 27 |

- Location: Tuscaloosa, Alabama
- Game start: 1:41 p.m.
- Elapsed time: 3:29
- Game attendance: 101,821
- Game weather: 44°; Cloudy
- Referee: Tom Ritter
- TV announcers (CBS): Verne Lundquist (play-by-play), Gary Danielson (color), Tracy Wolfson (sidelines)

Down 0–24 in the second quarter, Auburn rallied to defeat Alabama 28–27 in the 75th edition of the Iron Bowl at Bryant–Denny Stadium. Quarterback Cam Newton threw for three touchdown passes and rushed for another touchdown in the biggest comeback in Auburn football history.

Alabama, the 2009 BCS National Champion, came into the game with a 9–2 record. The Crimson Tide went ahead 7–0 with 11:34 to go in the first quarter on a 9-yard touchdown rush by Mark Ingram II, the 2009 Heisman Trophy winner. Auburn was forced to punt the ball back to Alabama after three plays, and the host team took possession at their own 19-yard line. Two plays later, senior quarterback Greg McElroy completed a 68-yard touchdown pass to wide receiver Julio Jones, and the Crimson Tide led 14–0 less than seven minutes into the game. Alabama added to their lead when McElroy completed his second touchdown pass of the first quarter, this time a 12-yard pass to Darius Hanks, and they led 21–0 with 1:53 remaining in the first quarter.

Early in the second quarter, the Crimson Tide threatened to score again, but Auburn's Antione Carter forced Mark Ingram II to fumble the ball away as Ingram was running towards an apparent touchdown. The ball rolled towards the Auburn endzone, and the Tigers' Demond Washington recovered it in the endzone for a touchback, but the Tigers' offense could not move the ball. Alabama went back on offense, but their drive stalled out at the Auburn 3-yard line. After Jeremy Shelley's 20-yard field goal, the Crimson Tide lead 24–0 midway through the second quarter. The Tigers' offense finally got on track, and Cam Newton completed a 36-yard touchdown pass to Emory Blake, cutting the Tide's lead to 24–7 at halftime.

On Auburn's second play from scrimmage to begin the third quarter, Newton completed a 70-yard touchdown pass to Terrell Zachery, making the score 24–14 just 56 seconds into the second half. The Tigers pulled to within three points with 4:25 remaining in the third quarter when Newton rushed for a 1-yard touchdown. Alabama's final scoring play of the day was a 32-yard field goal by Shelley, making the score 27–21.

The Tigers went ahead with 11:48 remaining in the game. Newton threw a 7-yard touchdown pass to tight end Philip Lutzenkirchen. Never in Auburn's football history had the Tigers come back from a 24-point deficit to win a game, and never had Alabama led in a game by 24 points and lost a game.

The CBS telecast of this game earned a 7.5 rating, the highest for any game of the 2010 college football season through week 13.

==== South Carolina (SEC Championship Game) ====
Auburn vs. South Carolina
(SEC Championship Game)

| Team | 1 | 2 | 3 | 4 | Total |
|---|---|---|---|---|---|
| • #1 Auburn | 21 | 7 | 14 | 14 | 56 |
| #18 South Carolina | 7 | 7 | 0 | 3 | 17 |

- Location: Atlanta, Georgia
- Game start: 3:11 p.m.
- Elapsed time: 3:35
- Game attendance: 75,802
- Game weather: Indoors
- Referee: Matt Moore
- TV announcers (CBS): Verne Lundquist (play-by-play), Gary Danielson (color), Tracy Wolfson (sidelines)

Auburn defeated South Carolina in the SEC Championship game by a score of 56 to 17. This was the most points scored in the history of the championship game and the largest margin of victory.

As it had been through the previous twelve games of the season, the Auburn offense was led by quarterback Cam Newton, who threw for a career-best 335 yards. Newton threw four touchdown passes and ran for two more touchdowns as the Tigers tied the school record for most wins in a season with their 13th victory. The Tigers went ahead on just their fourth play from scrimmage, a 12-yard pass from Newton to Onterrio McCalebb. The highlight of the opening drive was a 62-yard pass from Newton to Darvin Adams. The Gamecocks came back to tie the game on a 25-yard touchdown pass from Stephen Garcia to Patrick DiMarco. However, Auburn scored on their next two possessions to lead 21–7 at the end of the first quarter.

There was no scoring in the second quarter until South Carolina cut the Auburn lead to 21–14 with 16 seconds remaining in the period. Garcia threw a 1-yard touchdown pass to wide receiver Alshon Jeffery. The Tigers returned the ensuing kickoff to their own 41-yard line. On their first play Newton threw an 8-yard pass to Emory Blake, then Newton threw a Hail Mary pass towards the Gamecocks end zone that was deflected by a Carolina defender and caught by Adams for an improbable 51-yard touchdown pass on the last play of the first half, making the score 28–14.

The Tigers scored two touchdowns in the third quarter. The first was on a 1-yard run by Newton with 7:56 remaining in the period. On the Gamecocks' next possession, Auburn's T'Sharvan Bell intercepted a Garcia pass and returned it 10 yards for a touchdown, making the score 42–14 in Auburn's favor and essentially putting the game out of reach.

The Tigers set several SEC Championship game offensive records in the victory. The 56 points easily eclipsed the previous mark held by the 1996 Florida team, who scored 45 points. Newton's 408 total yards (335 passing, 73 rushing) was the most total yards gained by an individual, and Darvin Adams' 217 receiving yards was also a record.

==== Oregon (BCS National Championship Game) ====
Oregon vs. Auburn
(BCS National Championship Game)

| Team | 1 | 2 | 3 | 4 | Total |
|---|---|---|---|---|---|
| #2 Oregon | 0 | 11 | 0 | 8 | 19 |
| • #1 Auburn | 0 | 16 | 3 | 3 | 22 |

- Location: Glendale, Arizona
- Game start: 7:38 p.m.
- Elapsed time: 3:34
- Game attendance: 78,603
- Game weather: Indoors
- Referee: Bill LeMonnier
- TV announcers (ESPN): Brent Musburger (play-by-play), Kirk Herbstreit (color), Erin Andrews & Tom Rinaldi (sidelines)

This was the first meeting between the two schools. Coming into the game, Auburn had a 5–3 record against Pac-10 teams while Oregon was 4–4 against the SEC. The game was expected be a high-scoring shootout between two high-powered offenses, and while the teams combined for nearly 1,000 yards of total offense, both teams amassed their second-lowest point totals for the 2010 season.

After a scoreless first quarter, Oregon went ahead 3–0 early in the second quarter on a 26-yard field goal by Rob Beard. On their next offensive possession, Auburn went ahead 7–3. Heisman Trophy winner Cam Newton completed a 35-yard touchdown pass to former quarterback Kodi Burns and a successful PAT kick by Wes Byrum with 12:00 remaining in the first half. Oregon quickly retook the lead, scoring on 8-yard touchdown pass from Darron Thomas to LaMichael James and a two-point conversion run by Beard, the kicker, making the score 11–7 in favor of the Ducks with 10:58 remaining in the first half.

The Tigers cut the deficit to two points when Mike Blanc tackled James in the end zone for a safety with 3:26 remaining in the half, making the score 11–9. They took the lead on a 30-yard touchdown pass from Newton to Emory Blake with 1:47 left in the first half. Byrum's successful PAT made the score 16–11.

The only score in the third quarter came on a 28-yard field goal by Byrum. Auburn held onto its eight-point lead until Oregon's LaMichael James caught a two-yard touchdown pass from Darron Thomas with 2:33 remaining in the fourth quarter and another successful two-point conversion tied the score at 19–19. Senior kicker Wes Byrum kicked a 19-yard field goal as time expired to give Auburn its first BCS National Championship, its second national championship officially recognized by Auburn.

RB Michael Dyer and DT Nick Fairley were voted offensive and defensive most-valuable-player respectively.

== Rankings ==
Ranking movements Legend: ██ Increase in ranking ██ Decrease in ranking ( ) = First-place votes
| | Week | | | | | | | | | | | | | | | |
| Poll | Pre | 1 | 2 | 3 | 4 | 5 | 6 | 7 | 8 | 9 | 10 | 11 | 12 | 13 | 14 | Final |
|---|---|---|---|---|---|---|---|---|---|---|---|---|---|---|---|---|
| AP | 22 | 21 | 16 | 17 | 10 | 8 | 7 | 5 | 3 (3) | 3 (2) | 2 (2) | 2 (12) | 2 (13) | 2 (23) | 1 (36) | 1 (56) |
| Coaches | 23 | 20 | 15 | 14 | 11 | 8 | 7 | 5 (1) | 3 (3) | 2 (4) | 2 (4) | 2 (6) | 2 (4) | 2 (10) | 2 (24) | 1 (56) |
| Harris | Not released | | | | | | 7 | 5 | 3 (6) | 2 (10) | 2 (7) | 2 (35) | 2 (31) | 2 (42) | 1 (75) | Not released |
| BCS | Not released | | | | | | | 4 | 1 | 2 | 2 | 2 | 2 | 1 | 1 | Not released |

== NFL draft ==
1st Round, 1st Overall Pick by the Carolina Panthers—Jr. QB Cam Newton

1st Round, 13th Overall Pick by the Detroit Lions—Jr. DT Nick Fairley

7th Round, 212th Overall Pick by the Tennessee Titans—Sr. DT Zach Clayton

7th Round, 244th Overall Pick by the Carolina Panthers—Sr. OT Lee Ziemba

Undrafted Free Agents:

- Darvin Adams, WR, Carolina Panthers
- Mike Berry, OL New England Patriots
- Mike Blanc, DL, San Diego Chargers
- Josh Bynes, LB, Baltimore Ravens
- Wes Byrum, K, Seattle Seahawks
- Zac Etheridge, S, Oakland Raiders
- Mario Fannin, RB, Denver Broncos
- Ryan Pugh, OL, Carolina Panthers

== Notes ==
- The Tigers finished the season on top of the conference in scoring offense (42.7 points per game), rushing offense (287.2 yards per game) and total offense (497.7 yards per game). Auburn also led the conference in pass efficiency (174 of 261 passes, 6 interceptions, 66.7%, 29 touchdowns), third-down conversions (77 of 145, 53.1%) and first downs (316 or 24.3 per game).
