= 2010 Tennessee Volunteers football team =

American college football season

2010 Tennessee Volunteers football

Music City Bowl, L 27–30 ^{2OT} vs. North Carolina
- Conference: Southeastern Conference
- Eastern Division
- Record: 6–7 (3–5 SEC)
- Head coach: Derek Dooley (1st season)
- Offensive coordinator: Jim Chaney (2nd season)
- Offensive scheme: Pro-style
- Defensive coordinator: Justin Wilcox (1st season)
- Base defense: 3–4
- Home stadium: Neyland Stadium (Capacity: 102,455)

2010 Southeastern Conference football standings
	Conf.			Overall
Team	W		L	W		L
Eastern Division
No. 22 South Carolina x	5	–	3	9	–	5
Florida	4	–	4	8	–	5
Georgia	3	–	5	6	–	7
Tennessee	3	–	5	6	–	7
Kentucky	2	–	6	6	–	7
Vanderbilt	1	–	7	2	–	10
Western Division
No. 1 Auburn x$#	8	–	0	14	–	0
No. 12 Arkansas %	6	–	2	10	–	3
No. 8 LSU	6	–	2	11	–	2
No. 10 Alabama	5	–	3	10	–	3
No. 15 Mississippi State	4	–	4	9	–	4
Ole Miss*	1	–	7	4	–	8
Championship: Auburn 56, South Carolina 17
# – BCS National Champion; $ – BCS representative as conference champion; % – BCS at-large representative; x – Division champion/co-champions; * Ole Miss vacated all wins due to NCAA violations.; Rankings from AP Poll

The 2010 Tennessee Volunteers football team represented the University of Tennessee in the 2010 NCAA Division I FBS football season. The team was coached by Derek Dooley who was in his first season as the 22nd coach in UT football history. The Vols played their home games at Neyland Stadium and competed in the Eastern Division of the Southeastern Conference. The Vols played seven home games this season. Derek Dooley won his coaching debut with the Vols 50–0 versus Tennessee-Martin on September 4, 2010, in front of 99,123 at Neyland Stadium.

They finished the regular season 6–6, 3–5 in SEC play and were invited to the Music City Bowl where they were defeated by North Carolina 30–27.

== Personnel ==
=== Coaching staff ===
- Derek Dooley – Head coach
- Justin Wilcox – Defensive coordinator
- Jim Chaney – Offensive coordinator/offensive line coach
- Chuck Smith – Defensive line coach
- Charlie Baggett – Assistant head coach/wide receivers coach
- Lance Thompson – Linebackers coach
- Eric Russell – Tight ends/special teams coach
- Terry Joseph – Defensive backs coach/recruiting coordinator
- Harry Hiestand – Offensive line coach
- Darin Hinshaw – Quarterbacks coach

== Schedule ==
Date	Time	Opponent	Site	TV	Result	Attendance
September 4	6:00 p.m.	Tennessee-Martin*	Neyland Stadium; Knoxville, TN	PPV	W 50–0	99,123
September 11	7:00 p.m.	No. 7 Oregon*	Neyland Stadium; Knoxville, TN	ESPN2	L 13–48	102,035
September 18	3:30 p.m.	No. 10 Florida	Neyland Stadium; Knoxville, TN (Third Saturday in September)	CBS	L 17–31	102,455
September 25	12:21 p.m.	UAB*	Neyland Stadium; Knoxville, TN	SECN	W 32–29 ^{2OT}	95,183
October 2	3:30 p.m.	at No. 12 LSU	Tiger Stadium; Baton Rouge, LA	CBS	L 14–16	92,932
October 9	12:21 p.m.	at Georgia	Sanford Stadium; Athens, GA (rivalry)	SECN	L 14–41	92,746
October 23	7:00 p.m.	No. 8 Alabama	Neyland Stadium; Knoxville, TN (Third Saturday in October)	ESPN	L 10–41	102,455
October 30	12:21 p.m.	at No. 17 South Carolina	Williams-Brice Stadium; Columbia, SC (rivalry)	SECN	L 24–38	79,336
November 6	8:00 p.m.	at Memphis*	Liberty Bowl; Memphis, TN	CBSCS	W 50–14	39,742
November 13	12:00 p.m.	Ole Miss^{†}	Neyland Stadium; Knoxville, TN (rivalry)	CBS	W 52–14	96,044
November 20	7:30 p.m.	at Vanderbilt	Vanderbilt Stadium; Nashville, TN (rivalry)	CSS	W 24–10	37,017
November 27	12:21 p.m.	Kentucky	Neyland Stadium; Knoxville, TN (rivalry)	SECN	W 24–14	101,170
December 30	6:40 p.m.	vs. North Carolina*	LP Field; Nashville, TN (Music City Bowl)	ESPN	L 27–30 ^{2OT}	69,143
*Non-conference game; ^{†}Homecoming; Rankings from AP Poll released prior to the game; All times are in Eastern time

Schedule source: Dates and Matchups for all SEC Football Games for the 2010 SEC Season

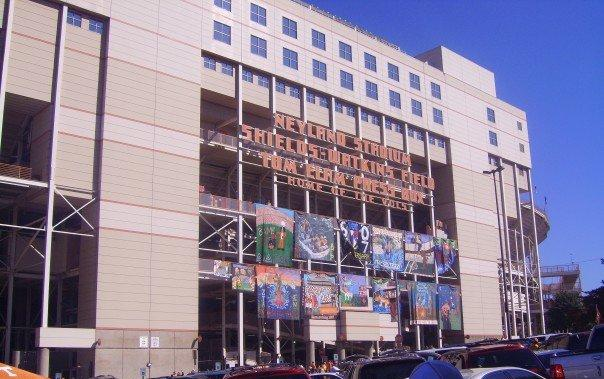
Neyland Stadium hosted seven Tennessee home games in 2010.

== Game summaries ==
=== Tennessee-Martin ===
Team	1	2	3	4	Total
UT Martin	0	0	0	0	0
• Tennessee	13	7	23	7	50

- Location: Knoxville, Tennessee
- Game start: 6:07 p.m.
- Elapsed time: 3:16
- Game attendance: 99,123
- Game weather: 77 (Clear with Slight Wind)
- Referee: Jeff Hilyer
- Television network: PPV

=== Oregon ===
Team	1	2	3	4	Total
• #7 Oregon	3	10	14	21	48
Tennessee	6	7	0	0	13

- Location: Knoxville, Tennessee
- Game start: 7:06 p.m.
- Elapsed time: 4:24
- Game attendance: 102,035
- Game weather: 83 (Wind, Rain, Lightning Delay)
- Referee: Steve Shaw
- TV announcers (ESPN2): Mike Patrick (Play-by-Play), Craig James (Color), Shelley Smith (Sideline)

Tennessee hosted Oregon on September 11, 2010. The Volunteers took an early lead of 6–0, before a lightning warning delayed the game for over seventy minutes; during the delay the score was 13–3. Oregon would go on to score 45 unanswered points to cruise to an easy 35 point win despite the weather, which appeared to hinder Oregon's fast-paced offense.

=== Florida ===
Team	1	2	3	4	Total
• #10 Florida	0	7	17	7	31
Tennessee	3	0	7	7	17

- Location: Knoxville, Tennessee
- Game start: 3:39 p.m.
- Elapsed time: 3:19
- Game attendance: 102,455
- Game weather: 89 (Sunny)
- Referee: Hubert Owens
- TV announcers (CBS): Verne Lundquist (play-by-play), Gary Danielson (color), Tracy Wolfson (sideline)

=== UAB ===
Team	1	2	3	4	OT	2OT	Total
UAB	7	0	8	8	3	3	29
• Tennessee	14	9	0	0	3	6	32

- Location: Knoxville, Tennessee
- Game start: 12:21 p.m.
- Elapsed time: 3:43
- Game attendance: 95,183
- Game weather: 76 (Cloudy, Slight Wind)
- Referee: Matt Austin
- TV announcers (SEC Network): Dave Neal (play-by-play), Andre Ware (color), Cara Capuano (sideline)

=== LSU ===
Team	1	2	3	4	Total
Tennessee	7	0	0	7	14
• #12 LSU	7	0	0	9	16

- Location: Baton Rouge, Louisiana
- Game start: 2:39 p.m.
- Elapsed time: 3:12
- Game attendance: 92,932
- Game weather: 85 (Clear)
- Referee: Marc Curles
- TV announcers (CBS): Craig Bolerjack (play-by-play), Steve Beurlein (color)

=== Georgia ===
Team	1	2	3	4	Total
Tennessee	0	7	7	0	14
• Georgia	17	10	14	0	41

- Location: Athens, Georgia
- Game start: 12:21 p.m.
- Elapsed time: 2:58
- Game attendance: 92,746
- Game weather: 75, Sunny
- Referee: Matt Austin
- TV announcers (SEC Network): Dave Neal (play-by-play), Andre Ware (color), Cara Capuano (sideline)

=== Alabama ===
Team	1	2	3	4	Total
• #7 Alabama	3	10	21	7	41
Tennessee	7	3	0	0	10

- Location: Knoxville, Tennessee
- Game start: 7:02 p.m.
- Elapsed time: 3:21
- Game attendance: 102,455
- Game weather: 69, Cloudy
- Referee: Hubert Owens
- TV announcers (ESPN): Brad Nessler (play-by-play), Todd Blackledge (color), Holly Rowe (sideline)

=== South Carolina ===
Team	1	2	3	4	Total
Tennessee	3	7	7	7	24
• #17 South Carolina	0	10	14	14	38

- Location: Columbia, South Carolina
- Game start: 12:21 p.m.
- Game attendance: 79,336
- TV announcers (SEC Network): Dave Neal (play-by-play), Andre Ware (color), Cara Capuano (sideline)

=== Memphis ===
Team	1	2	3	4	Total
• Tennessee	13	27	10	0	50
Memphis	7	0	0	7	14

- Location: Memphis, Tennessee
- Game start: 8:00 p.m.
- Game attendance: 39,742
- Television network: CBSC

=== Mississippi ===
Team	1	2	3	4	Total
Mississippi	0	14	0	0	14
• Tennessee	21	10	14	7	52

- Location: Knoxville, Tennessee
- Game start: 12:00pm
- Elapsed time: 3:28
- Game attendance: 96,044
- Referee: Matt Austin
- TV announcers (CBS): Craig Bolerjack, Steve Beuerlein

=== Vanderbilt ===
Team	1	2	3	4	Total
• Tennessee	7	7	0	10	24
Vanderbilt	0	3	0	7	10

- Location: Nashville, Tennessee
- Game attendance: 37,017

=== Kentucky ===
Team	1	2	3	4	Total
Kentucky	7	0	7	0	14
• Tennessee	0	14	7	3	24

- Location: Knoxville, Tennessee
- Game start: 12:21pm
- Game weather: 45 degrees
- Television network: SEC Network

== Depth chart ==
Starters and backups (Subject to Change)

Returning starters in bold

**Defense**

FS
**Janzen Jackson**
Tyler Wolf

WLB	MLB	SLB
⋅	**Nick Reveiz**	⋅
Savion Frazier	John Propst	⋅

SS
Brent Brewer
⋅

CB
Marsalis Teague
Eric Gordon

DE	DT	DT	DE
**Chris Walker**	Victor Thomas	Malik Jackson	Gerald Williams
Jacques Smith	**Montori Hughes**	Joseph Ayres	Corey Miller

CB
Prentiss Waggner
Anthony Anderson

**Offense**

WR
**Gerald Jones**
Da'Rick Rogers

LT	LG	C	RG	RT
Dallas Thomas	JerQuari Schofield	James Stone	Zach Fulton	Ja'Wuan James
Marques Pair	Jarrod Shaw	Darin Gooch	Carson Anderson	Daniel Hood

TE
**Luke Stocker**
Mychal Rivera

WR
**Denarius Moore**
Justin Hunter

QB
Tyler Bray
Matt Simms

RB
Tauren Poole
Rajion Neal

FB
Channing Fugate
**Kevin Cooper**

Special teams
**PK** **Daniel Lincoln**
**PK** Michael Palardy
**P** **Chad Cunningham**
**P** Michael Palardy
**KR** Da'Rick Rogers/Rajion Neal
**PR** Anthony Anderson
**LS** Nick Guess
**H** Chad Cunningham

== Team players drafted into the NFL ==
Player	Position	Round	Pick	NFL club
Luke Stocker	Tight end	4	104	Tampa Bay Buccaneers
Denarius Moore	Wide receiver	5	148	Oakland Raiders
