= 2010 SEC Championship Game =

- Conference Championship
- 2010 SEC Championship logo
Auburn Tigers	South Carolina Gamecocks
(12–0)	(9–3)
56	17
Head coach: Gene Chizik	Head coach: Steve Spurrier
AP / Coaches / BCS; 2 / 2 / 1	AP / Coaches / BCS; 18 / 16 / 19
	1	2	3	4	Total
Auburn	21	7	14	14	56
South Carolina	7	7	0	3	17
- Date: December 4, 2010
- Season: 2010
- Stadium: Georgia Dome
- Location: Atlanta, Georgia
- MVP: QB Cam Newton, Auburn
- Favorite: Auburn by 3½
- Referee: Matt Moore
- Halftime show: Dr. Pepper Tuition Throw

United States TV coverage
- Network: CBS
- Announcers: Verne Lundquist (play-by-play); Gary Danielson (color); Tracy Wolfson (sideline)

2010 Southeastern Conference football standings
	Conf.			Overall
Team	W		L	W		L
Eastern Division
No. 22 South Carolina x	5	–	3	9	–	5
Florida	4	–	4	8	–	5
Georgia	3	–	5	6	–	7
Tennessee	3	–	5	6	–	7
Kentucky	2	–	6	6	–	7
Vanderbilt	1	–	7	2	–	10
Western Division
No. 1 Auburn x$#	8	–	0	14	–	0
No. 12 Arkansas %	6	–	2	10	–	3
No. 8 LSU	6	–	2	11	–	2
No. 10 Alabama	5	–	3	10	–	3
No. 15 Mississippi State	4	–	4	9	–	4
Ole Miss*	1	–	7	4	–	8
Championship: Auburn 56, South Carolina 17
# – BCS National Champion; $ – BCS representative as conference champion; % – BCS at-large representative; x – Division champion/co-champions; * Ole Miss vacated all wins due to NCAA violations.; Rankings from AP Poll

The 2010 SEC Championship Game was played on December 4, 2010, in the Georgia Dome in Atlanta to determine the 2010 football champion of the Southeastern Conference (SEC). The game featured the Auburn Tigers, the champion of the West Division, and the South Carolina Gamecocks, champion of the East Division. South Carolina was the designated "home team". The SEC East is 11–8 in SEC Championship games, with the Florida Gators accounting for seven of the 11 victories.

Auburn defeated South Carolina 35–27 in Auburn during the regular season.

The game began at 4:00 p.m. EST and was televised by CBS Sports, for the tenth straight season. It featured Auburn's Heisman Trophy contending quarterback Cam Newton against South Carolina's Stephen Garcia; running backs Marcus Lattimore (South Carolina) and Mike Dyer (Auburn); and receivers Alshon Jeffery (South Carolina) and Darvin Adams (Auburn). Gene Chizik and Steve Spurrier were the coaches of the teams.

== Highlights ==
The No. 1 ranked BCS team had lost its conference championship game three seasons in a row and Auburn ended the streak this year. Auburn broke the SEC Championship Game records for most offensive yards, most points scored and largest margin of victory. Auburn receiver Darvin Adams set the game record for most receiving yards with 217. Auburn quarterback Cam Newton matched the game record for touchdown responsibility with six, four throwing and two running, which included a Hail Mary touchdown at the end of the first half.
