= 2010 Mississippi State Bulldogs football team =

American college football season

2010 Mississippi State Bulldogs football

Gator Bowl champion

Gator Bowl, W 52–14 vs. Michigan
- Conference: Southeastern Conference
- Western Division

Ranking
- Coaches: No. 17
- AP: No. 15
- Record: 9–4 (4–4 SEC)
- Head coach: Dan Mullen (2nd season)
- Offensive coordinator: Les Koenning (2nd season)
- Offensive scheme: Spread (multiple)
- Defensive coordinator: Manny Diaz (1st season)
- Co-defensive coordinator: Chris Wilson (1st season)
- Base defense: 4–3
- Home stadium: Davis Wade Stadium

2010 Southeastern Conference football standings
	Conf.			Overall
Team	W		L	W		L
Eastern Division
No. 22 South Carolina x	5	–	3	9	–	5
Florida	4	–	4	8	–	5
Georgia	3	–	5	6	–	7
Tennessee	3	–	5	6	–	7
Kentucky	2	–	6	6	–	7
Vanderbilt	1	–	7	2	–	10
Western Division
No. 1 Auburn x$#	8	–	0	14	–	0
No. 12 Arkansas %	6	–	2	10	–	3
No. 8 LSU	6	–	2	11	–	2
No. 10 Alabama	5	–	3	10	–	3
No. 15 Mississippi State	4	–	4	9	–	4
Ole Miss*	1	–	7	4	–	8
Championship: Auburn 56, South Carolina 17
# – BCS National Champion; $ – BCS representative as conference champion; % – BCS at-large representative; x – Division champion/co-champions; * Ole Miss vacated all wins due to NCAA violations.; Rankings from AP Poll

The 2010 Mississippi State Bulldogs football team represented Mississippi State University during the 2010 NCAA Division I FBS football season. Mississippi State has been a member of the Southeastern Conference (SEC) since the league's inception in 1932, and has participated in that conference's Western Division since 1992. The Bulldogs played their home games at Davis Wade Stadium at Scott Field in Starkville, Mississippi, which has been MSU football's "home" stadium since 1914. The Bulldogs finished the season 9–4, 4–4 in SEC play and faced Michigan in the Gator Bowl, which they won 52–14. The team finished with a #15 final ranking in the AP Poll, making them 2010's most improved team in the SEC. Vick Ballard set the school record for rushing touchdowns in a single season with 19 in the 2010 season.

== Schedule ==
Date	Time	Opponent	Rank	Site	TV	Result	Attendance
September 4	6:00 pm	Memphis*		Davis Wade Stadium; Starkville, MS	ESPNU	W 49–7	56,032
September 9	6:30 pm	No. 21 Auburn		Davis Wade Stadium; Starkville, MS	ESPN	L 14–17	54,806
September 18	6:00 pm	at No. 15 LSU		Tiger Stadium; Baton Rouge, LA (rivalry)	ESPNU	L 7–29	92,538
September 25	6:00 pm	Georgia		Davis Wade Stadium; Starkville, MS	SECRN	W 24–12	56,721
October 2	11:00 am	Alcorn State*		Davis Wade Stadium; Starkville, MS	SECRN	W 49–16	50,439
October 9	7:00 pm	at Houston*		Robertson Stadium; Houston, TX	CBSCS	W 47–24	32,067
October 16	6:00 pm	at No. 22 Florida		Ben Hill Griffin Stadium; Gainesville, FL	ESPNU	W 10–7	90,517
October 23	6:00 pm	UAB*^{†}	No. 24	Davis Wade Stadium; Starkville, MS	ESPNU	W 29–24	56,423
October 30	6:00 pm	Kentucky	No. 23	Davis Wade Stadium; Starkville, MS	ESPNU	W 24–17	54,168
November 13	6:15 pm	at No. 11 Alabama	No. 17	Bryant–Denny Stadium; Tuscaloosa, AL (rivalry)	ESPN2	L 10–30	101,821
November 20	6:00 pm	No. 13 Arkansas	No. 22	Davis Wade Stadium; Starkville, MS	ESPN	L 31–38 ^{2OT}	56,406
November 27	6:00 pm	at Ole Miss	No. 25	Vaught–Hemingway Stadium; Oxford, MS (Egg Bowl)	ESPNU	W 31–23	58,625
January 1	12:30 pm	vs. Michigan*	No. 21	EverBank Field; Jacksonville, FL (Gator Bowl)	ESPN2	W 52–14	77,497
*Non-conference game; ^{†}Homecoming; Rankings from AP Poll released prior to the game; All times are in Central time

== Game summaries ==
=== Memphis ===
	1	2	3	4	Total
Tigers	0	0	0	7	7
Bulldogs	14	7	21	7	49

=== Auburn ===
	1	2	3	4	Total
#21 Tigers	7	10	0	0	17
Bulldogs	7	0	7	0	14

=== LSU ===
	1	2	3	4	Total
Bulldogs	0	0	7	0	7
#15 Tigers	3	9	14	3	29

=== Georgia ===
	1	2	3	4	Total
Georgia Bulldogs	0	6	0	6	12
Mississippi State Bulldogs	7	0	0	17	24

=== Alcorn State ===
	1	2	3	4	Total
Braves	0	16	0	0	16
Bulldogs	7	28	0	14	49

=== Houston ===
	1	2	3	4	Total
Bulldogs	23	10	7	7	47
Cougars	7	3	7	7	24

=== Florida ===
	1	2	3	4	Total
Bulldogs	10	0	0	0	10
#22 Gators	0	0	7	0	7

=== UAB ===
	1	2	3	4	Total
Blazers	3	7	7	7	24
#24 Bulldogs	7	3	10	9	29

=== Kentucky ===
	1	2	3	4	Total
Wildcats	7	3	7	0	17
#21 Bulldogs	10	7	0	7	24

=== Alabama ===
	1	2	3	4	Total
#19 Bulldogs	3	0	0	7	10
#12 Crimson Tide	6	14	7	3	30

=== Arkansas ===
	1	2	3	4	2OT	Total
#13 Razorbacks	14	3	7	7	7	38
#21 Bulldogs	7	14	0	10	0	31

=== Ole Miss ===
	1	2	3	4	Total
#25 Bulldogs	0	21	10	0	31
Rebels	6	3	0	14	23

=== Gator Bowl ===
	1	2	3	4	Total
#21 Bulldogs	10	21	14	7	52
Wolverines	14	0	0	0	14
