= 2010 Vanderbilt Commodores football team =

American college football season

2010 Vanderbilt Commodores football
- Conference: Southeastern Conference
- Eastern Division
- Record: 2–10 (1–7 SEC)
- Head coach: Robbie Caldwell (1st season)
- Offensive coordinator: Jimmy Kiser (1st season)
- Co-offensive coordinator: Desmond Kitchings (1st season)
- Offensive scheme: Multiple
- Defensive coordinator: Jamie Bryant (2nd season)
- Base defense: 4–3
- Captain: 4: Joey Bailey; T. J. Greenstone; Adam Smotherman; Chris Marve
- Home stadium: Vanderbilt Stadium

2010 Southeastern Conference football standings
| | Conf. | | | Overall |
| Team | W | | L | W | | L |
|---|---|---|---|---|---|---|
Eastern Division
| No. 22 South Carolina x | 5 | – | 3 | 9 | – | 5 |
| Florida | 4 | – | 4 | 8 | – | 5 |
| Georgia | 3 | – | 5 | 6 | – | 7 |
| Tennessee | 3 | – | 5 | 6 | – | 7 |
| Kentucky | 2 | – | 6 | 6 | – | 7 |
| Vanderbilt | 1 | – | 7 | 2 | – | 10 |
Western Division
| No. 1 Auburn x$# | 8 | – | 0 | 14 | – | 0 |
| No. 12 Arkansas % | 6 | – | 2 | 10 | – | 3 |
| No. 8 LSU | 6 | – | 2 | 11 | – | 2 |
| No. 10 Alabama | 5 | – | 3 | 10 | – | 3 |
| No. 15 Mississippi State | 4 | – | 4 | 9 | – | 4 |
| Ole Miss* | 1 | – | 7 | 4 | – | 8 |
Championship: Auburn 56, South Carolina 17
# – BCS National Champion; $ – BCS representative as conference champion; % – BCS at-large representative; x – Division champion/co-champions; * Ole Miss vacated all wins due to NCAA violations.; Rankings from AP Poll

The 2010 Vanderbilt Commodores football team represented Vanderbilt University during the 2010 college football season. The team's head coach was Robbie Caldwell, who had been serving as interim head coach following the unexpected retirement of previous head coach Bobby Johnson in July 2010. Vanderbilt has been a member of the Southeastern Conference (SEC) since the league's inception in 1932, and has participated in that conference's Eastern Division since its formation in 1992. The Commodores played their seven home games at Vanderbilt Stadium at Dudley Field in Nashville, Tennessee, which has been Vanderbilt football's home stadium since 1922. The Commodores finished the season 2–10, 1–7 in SEC play. Caldwell resigned at the end of the season.

== Schedule ==
| Date | Time | Opponent | Site | TV | Result | Attendance |
|---|---|---|---|---|---|---|
| September 4 | 6:30 p.m. | Northwestern* | [[FirstBank Stadium}Vanderbilt Stadium]]; Nashville, TN | CSS | L 21–23 | 37,210 |
| September 11 | 6:00 p.m. | No. 19 LSU | Vanderbilt Stadium; Nashville, TN | ESPNU | L 3–27 | 36,940 |
| September 18 | 11:21 a.m. | at Ole Miss | Vaught–Hemingway Stadium; Oxford, MS (rivalry) | SECN | W 28–14 | 51,667 |
| October 2 | 11:00 a.m. | at Connecticut* | Rentschler Field; East Hartford, CT | Big East Network | L 21–40 | 40,000 |
| October 9 | 6:00 p.m. | Eastern Michigan* | Vanderbilt Stadium; Nashville, TN | ESPNU | W 52–6 | 33,107 |
| October 16 | 11:21 a.m. | at Georgia | Sanford Stadium; Athens, GA (rivalry) | SECN | L 0–43 | 92,746 |
| October 23 | 6:00 p.m. | No. 19 South Carolina^{†} | Vanderbilt Stadium; Nashville, TN | SECRN | L 7–21 | 33,425 |
| October 30 | 6:00 p.m. | at No. 19 Arkansas | Donald W. Reynolds Razorback Stadium; Fayetteville, AR | SECRN | L 14–49 | 70,430 |
| November 6 | 11:21 a.m. | Florida | Vanderbilt Stadium; Nashville, TN | SECN | L 14–55 | 33,848 |
| November 13 | 11:21 a.m. | at Kentucky | Commonwealth Stadium; Lexington, KY (rivalry) | SECN | L 20–38 | 60,391 |
| November 20 | 6:30 p.m. | Tennessee | Vanderbilt Stadium; Nashville, TN (rivalry) | CSS | L 10–24 | 37,017 |
| November 27 | 6:30 p.m. | Wake Forest* | Vanderbilt Stadium; Nashville, TN | SECN | L 13–34 | 21,338 |
*Non-conference game; ^{†}Homecoming; Rankings from AP Poll released prior to the game; All times are in Central time

== Game summaries ==
=== Northwestern ===
| Team | 1 | 2 | 3 | 4 | Total |
|---|---|---|---|---|---|
| • Northwestern | 10 | 0 | 7 | 6 | 23 |
| Vanderbilt | 0 | 9 | 6 | 6 | 21 |

- Location: Nashville, TN
- Game start: 6:35 p.m.
- Elapsed time: 3:17
- Game attendance: 37,210
- Game weather: 78, Sunny
- Referee: Dennis Lipski
- Television network: CSS

Northwestern jumped out to a 10–0 lead in the first half led by first year starting quarterback Dan Persa. Vanderbilt scored its first TD late in the first half on a TD run by Warren Norman, but the extra point was missed. Vanderbilt scored a field goal as time expired in the first half to make the score 10–9. Persa threw for another TD in the 3rd quarter to extend the lead to 17–9. Vanderbilt rallied late in the 3rd quarter on a 36-yard pass from Larry Smith to TE Brandon Barden, but Vanderbilt could not convert the two-point conversion that would have tied the game, making the score 17–15 at the end of the third quarter. Persa added a third TD pass in the 4th quarter, but the extra point was not converted due to a mishandled snap, keeping the margin to one possession. Vanderbilt later blocked a Northwestern field goal attempt and scored late in the 4th quarter, but was unable to convert again on the two point play to tie the game at 23–23. Vanderbilt nearly got a final possession in the game, after appearing to stop Persa short of a first down on 3rd and 6 with under two minutes remaining, but Vanderbilt was flagged for an illegal hit, allowing Northwestern to run out the clock.

=== LSU ===
| Team | 1 | 2 | 3 | 4 | Total |
|---|---|---|---|---|---|
| • #19 LSU | 0 | 10 | 0 | 17 | 27 |
| Vanderbilt | 0 | 0 | 3 | 0 | 3 |

- Location: Nashville, Tennessee
- Game start: 6:00 p.m.
- Elapsed time: 3:05
- Game attendance: 36,940
- Game weather: 78, Cloudy
- Referee: Ken Williamson
- TV announcers (ESPNU): Clay Matvick (play-by-play), Herm Edwards (color)

After an uneventful first quarter in which neither offense could put a drive together, LSU scored early in the second quarter off of a 30-yard run by Russell Shepard. LSU added a field goal as time expired in the first half to increase the lead to 10–0. Vanderbilt scored a field goal on their first possession of the second half and then got the ball back off of an interception thrown by Jordan Jefferson. Vanderbilt, however, failed to produce on offense for the remainder of the game, with all further drives resulting in punts. LSU added a field goal and two rushing touchdowns in the fourth quarter to end the game with the score 27–3. Vanderbilt struggled on offense throughout the game, producing just 4.4 yards per pass and 2 yards per rush against a solid LSU defense.

=== Mississippi ===
| Team | 1 | 2 | 3 | 4 | Total |
|---|---|---|---|---|---|
| • Vanderbilt | 0 | 14 | 7 | 7 | 28 |
| Ole Miss | 0 | 7 | 7 | 0 | 14 |

- Location: Oxford, MS
- Game start: 11:21 a.m.
- Elapsed time: 3:28
- Game attendance: 51,667
- Game weather: 81, Clear
- Referee: Penn Wagers
- TV announcers (SECN): Dave Neal (play-by-play), Andre Ware (color), Cara Capuano (sideline)

After a defense-dominated first quarter in which both teams ended all drives with punts, Vanderbilt put together a 13-play 96-yard drive capped off by at 35-yard run by Zac Stacey for at touchdown. Vanderbilt increased their lead to 14–0 after returning a Jeremiah Masoli interception for a touchdown later in the second quarter. Ole Miss bounced back, scoring a touchdown on their next drive to put the score at 14–7 at the half. The Rebels tied the game in the third quarter on a 28-yard run by Masoli, but the Commodores immediately answered on their next possession with an 80-yard touchdown run by Warren Norman. Larry Smith added a 15-yard touchdown rush in the 4th quarter while the Vanderbilt defense shut out the Rebels for the remainder of the game to give the Commodores the win 28–14.

=== Connecticut ===
| Team | 1 | 2 | 3 | 4 | Total |
|---|---|---|---|---|---|
| Vanderbilt | 0 | 21 | 0 | 0 | 21 |
| • Connecticut | 7 | 14 | 10 | 9 | 40 |

- Location: East Hartford, CT
- Game start: 12:08 p.m.
- Elapsed time: 3:16
- Game attendance: 40,000
- Game weather: 60, Sunny
- Referee: Steve Shaw
- Television network: Big East Network

=== Eastern Michigan ===
| Team | 1 | 2 | 3 | 4 | Total |
|---|---|---|---|---|---|
| Eastern Michigan | 3 | 0 | 3 | 0 | 6 |
| • Vanderbilt | 7 | 24 | 14 | 7 | 52 |

- Location: Nashville, Tennessee
- Game start: 6:05 p.m.
- Elapsed time: 3:12
- Game attendance: 33,107
- Game weather: 85, Fair
- Referee: Penn Wagers
- TV announcers (ESPNU): Clay Matvick (play-by-play), Herm Edwards (color)

=== Georgia ===
| Team | 1 | 2 | 3 | 4 | Total |
|---|---|---|---|---|---|
| Vanderbilt | 0 | 0 | 0 | 0 | 0 |
| • Georgia | 12 | 10 | 21 | 0 | 43 |

- Location: Athens, GA
- Game start: 12:21 p.m.
- Game attendance: 92,746
- TV announcers (SECN): Dave Neal (play-by-play), Andre Ware (color), Cara Capuano (sideline)

=== South Carolina ===
| Team | 1 | 2 | 3 | 4 | Total |
|---|---|---|---|---|---|
| • #19 South Carolina | 0 | 7 | 7 | 7 | 21 |
| Vanderbilt | 0 | 7 | 0 | 0 | 7 |

- Location: Nashville, Tennessee
- Game start: 6:00 p.m.
- Game attendance: 33,425
- Television network: SECRN

=== Arkansas ===
| Team | 1 | 2 | 3 | 4 | Total |
|---|---|---|---|---|---|
| Vanderbilt | 14 | 0 | 0 | 0 | 14 |
| • #19 Arkansas | 6 | 26 | 3 | 14 | 49 |

- Location: Fayetteville, AR
- Game attendance: 70,430
- Television network: SECRN

=== Florida ===
| Team | 1 | 2 | 3 | 4 | Total |
|---|---|---|---|---|---|
| • Florida | 7 | 34 | 14 | 0 | 55 |
| Vanderbilt | 0 | 0 | 7 | 7 | 14 |

- Location: Nashville, Tennessee
- Game start: 11:21 a.m.
- Game attendance: 33,848
- Television network: SECN

=== Kentucky ===
| Team | 1 | 2 | 3 | 4 | Total |
|---|---|---|---|---|---|
| Vanderbilt | 3 | 10 | 0 | 7 | 20 |
| • Kentucky | 3 | 7 | 14 | 14 | 38 |

- Location: Lexington, KY
- Television network: SECN

=== Tennessee ===
| Team | 1 | 2 | 3 | 4 | Total |
|---|---|---|---|---|---|
| • Tennessee | 7 | 7 | 0 | 10 | 24 |
| Vanderbilt | 0 | 3 | 0 | 7 | 10 |

- Location: Nashville, Tennessee
- Television network: CSS

=== Wake Forest ===
| Team | 1 | 2 | 3 | 4 | Total |
|---|---|---|---|---|---|
| • Wake Forest | 10 | 14 | 3 | 7 | 34 |
| Vanderbilt | 3 | 3 | 0 | 7 | 13 |

- Location: Nashville, Tennessee
- Television network: SECN
