= Onterio McCalebb =

American gridiron football player (born 1989)

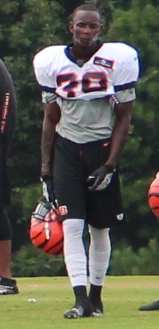
- McCalebb with the Cincinnati Bengals in 2013

No. 39
- Position: Running back / Wide receiver / Return specialist

Personal information
- Born: August 10, 1989 (age 37); Fort Meade, Florida, U.S.
- Listed height: 5 ft 10 in (1.78 m)
- Listed weight: 175 lb (79 kg)

Career information
- High school: Fort Meade
- College: Auburn
- NFL draft: 2013: undrafted

Career history
- Cincinnati Bengals (2013–2014); Ottawa Redblacks (2016)*
- * Offseason or practice squad member only

Awards and highlights
- BCS national champion (2011); Second-team All-SEC (2011); 2011 Chick-fil-A Bowl Offensive MVP
- Stats at Pro Football Reference

Onterio McCalebb (born August 10, 1989) is an American former professional football player who was a wide receiver for the Cincinnati Bengals of the National Football League (NFL). He played college football for the Auburn Tigers, winning a national championship in 2010. McCalebb garnered much attention with an impressive performance in the 40-yard dash at the 2013 NFL Combine, recording an official time of 4.34 seconds, the fastest by a running back.

== Early life ==
McCalebb grew up in Fort Meade, Florida, raised primarily by his grandmother and father.

McCalebb attended Fort Meade High School in Fort Meade, Florida, where he played football, basketball, and ran track. As a senior in 2007, McCalebb rushed for 1,995 yards and 27 touchdowns, while adding 11 receptions for 300 yards through the air. He also returned two kickoffs for touchdowns. In addition to being a volatile rusher and kick return, McCalebb was an All-State punter, averaging 45.3 net punting average.

In track & field, McCalebb competed as a sprinter. At the 2008 1A Region 3 Meet, he earned a first-place finish in the 100-meter dash, recording a personal-best time of 10.90 seconds. He won the 200-meter dash at the 2008 FHSAA 1A T&F Championships, with a time of 22.44 seconds. In addition, he was also a member of the 4 × 100 m relay squad.

Scout.com gave McCalebb a four-star rating and ranked him as the No. 38 running back in the nation in 2008. He visited Auburn, Clemson, Rutgers, and West Virginia before signing a letter of intent with Auburn.

== College career ==
After spending one semester at Hargrave Military Academy in Chatham, Virginia, McCalebb enrolled at Auburn University in January 2009.

In McCalebb's college football debut against Louisiana Tech in 2009, McCalebb became the first Auburn freshman since Bo Jackson in 1982 to rush for more than 100 yards in his first game by gaining 152 yards on 22 carries. He was named the Southeastern Conference Freshman of the Week for his performance.

McCalebb became the first freshman in Auburn history to surpass 100 yards rushing in his first two games when he totaled 157 yards on 16 carries against Mississippi State on September 12, 2009.

McCalebb battled injuries throughout his freshman year, but still managed to place second on the team with 565 rushing yards. He scored four touchdowns his freshman season.

McCalebb would share the backfield with star back Michael Dyer and elusive quarterback Cam Newton in 2010. That didn't stop him from breaking the Auburn single season yards-per-carry record (8.5). McCalebb scored 7 touchdowns over a pivotal 5 game span for the eventual national champions. Three of those scores came during the division clinching victory over Georgia. Perhaps his best play of the season was a 70-yard go-ahead touchdown versus #6 LSU that ended up being the game winning score. McCalebb finished the season with over 900 yards rushing and was an integral part in the Tigers winning the national championship

McCalebb ran for 532 yards during the 2011 regular season, playing in the shadows of Michael Dyer. He took advantage of a Dyer bowl suspension, however, scampering for 109 yards on 10 carries in the Chick-Fil-A Bowl. He also tacked on 53 receiving yards in the season ending victory.

== Professional career ==
Pre-draft measurables
Height	Weight	Arm length	Hand span	40-yard dash	10-yard split	20-yard split	20-yard shuttle	Three-cone drill	Vertical jump	Broad jump
5 ft 10 in (1.78 m)	168 lb (76 kg)	31 in (0.79 m)	9 in (0.23 m)	4.34 s	1.50 s	2.47 s	4.32 s	7.02 s	34 in (0.86 m)	10 ft 1 in (3.07 m)
All values from NFL Combine;

=== Cincinnati Bengals ===
Briefly after the 2013 NFL draft, McCalebb was signed as an undrafted free agent by the Cincinnati Bengals on April 27, 2013. After being signed by the Bengals, McCalebb switched positions to cornerback. Special teams coach Darrin Simmons said that the Bengals will try to use him as a gunner and return man on special teams. In two seasons with the Bengals he only appeared in one game. On September 6, 2015, the Bengals and McCalebb agreed to an injury settlement allowing for his release from the team.

=== Ottawa RedBlacks ===
On March 3, 2016, McCalebb signed a contract with the Ottawa Redblacks of the Canadian Football League. RedBlacks GM Marcel Desjardins said that the team plans to get McCalebb in competition as a kick and punt return specialist, and possibly integrate him into the offense in certain packages. He was released by the team on April 27, 2016.

== See also ==
- List of college football yearly rushing leaders
