= Ryan Pugh =

American football player and coach (born 1988)

Current position
- Title: Offensive Line
- Team: Applachian State
- Conference: Sun Belt

Biographical details
- Born: December 4, 1988 (age 37); Hoover, Alabama, U.S.

Playing career
- 2007−2010: Auburn
- Position: Center

Coaching career (HC unless noted)
- 2012: Auburn (GA)
- 2013: Virginia Tech (GA)
- 2014: Cincinnati (GA)
- 2015: LSU (GA)
- 2016–2017: UTSA (OL)
- 2018: BYU (OL)
- 2019–2020: Troy (OC/OL)
- 2021: Southern (OL/RGC)
- 2022: Abilene Christian (OL)
- 2023: Abilene Christian (OC)
- 2024–2025: Abilene Christian (OL)
- 2026–present: Appalachian State (OL)

Accomplishments and honors

Awards
- Third-team All-American (2010); First-team All-SEC (2010); Second-team All-SEC (2009)

Ryan Pugh (born December 4, 1988) is an American football coach and former player who is currently the offensive line coach at Appalachian State. Previously, he was the offensive line coach at Abilene Christian and, before that, the offensive line coach and running game coordinator at Southern University. Before going to Southern, he was most recently the offensive coordinator and offensive line coach at Troy. Pugh was a prominent center for the Auburn Tigers of Auburn University; selected All-Southeastern Conference in 2010. He is married to Cathey Lee (Dalton) Pugh.
