= Darrington Sentimore =

American football player (born 1990)

Profile
- Position: Defensive lineman

Personal information
- Born: February 17, 1990 (age 36); Norco, Louisiana, U.S.
- Listed height: 6 ft 2 in (1.88 m)
- Listed weight: 288 lb (131 kg)

Career information
- High school: Destrehan (Destrehan, Louisiana)
- College: University of Alabama (2010); University of Tennessee (2012)
- Stats at ESPN

Darrington Sentimore (born February 17, 1990) is an American former football defensive lineman.

== Early life ==
Sentimore was a standout athlete at Destrehan High School in Destrehan, Louisiana. Under head coach Stephen Robicheaux, Sentimore would put together a stellar high school career. As a junior in 2007, he recorded 120 tackles, 47 tackles for loss, and 16 sacks. As a senior in 2008, he recorded 78 tackles and six sacks. He was named All-State three times in his career. His accolades allowed for a stellar recruiting resume. The Rivals.com recruiting service had him as the 13th best defensive tackle and the seventh best player from the state of Louisiana. The Scout.com recruiting service had him as the 23rd best defensive end. ESPNU had him ranked as the 20th best defensive tackle. In the end, he was rated as a four-star recruit. After a long recruiting process that involved several schools, including LSU, Oklahoma, Auburn, Tennessee, Miami, Ole Miss, Arkansas, Nebraska, Michigan, Texas A&M, and Mississippi State. Sentimore would commit to play for the University of Alabama under head coach Nick Saban.

== College career ==
=== Alabama ===
Sentimore started his Alabama career with a redshirt for the 2009 season.

The next season, Sentimore would appear in 11 games for the Crimson Tide. Against San Jose State, Sentimore recorded two tackles and a forced fumble. Two weeks later, against Duke, Sentimore recorded a 1/2 sack, the first of his career. On the season, he would record nine tackles, 1/2 sacks, and one forced fumble.

The offseason was tumultuous for Sentimore. On June 28, 2011, Nick Saban indefinitely suspended Sentimore due to a violation of unspecified team rules and policy.

=== Mississippi Gulf Coast Community College ===
After his suspension from Alabama, Sentimore would transfer to Mississippi Gulf Coast Community College under head coach Steve Campbell. In his one season with Mississippi Gulf Coast, Sentimore had 39 tackles and seven sacks. After his one season with the Bulldogs, Sentimore signed a letter of intent with the University of Tennessee.

=== Tennessee ===
Sentimore came to the University of Tennessee in a comeback attempt. Under head coach Derek Dooley, Sentimore would be counted on with the departure of All-SEC selection Malik Jackson to the NFL. With the Volunteers in the 2012 season, Sentimore would record statistics in eight games on the season. In a game against his former team, Alabama, Sentimore had three tackles and one sack. He registered 18 total tackles, four sacks, and two defended passes in the 2012 season. After the season, Sentimore declared his intention to enter the 2013 NFL draft.

== Professional career ==
Sentimore went undrafted in the 2013 NFL Draft. He did earn a tryout session with the Cincinnati Bengals. He earned a camp spot, but he was injured and was later released by the team.

After his stint with the Bengals, Sentimore played with the Colorado Ice of the Indoor Football League in 2014.

== Personal life ==
Sentimore's parents are Jerome Sentimore and Theresa Peabody. He was raised in Norco, LA and has 2 older sisters Ashley and Alicia Sentimore and 2 brothers Detriel Sentimore and Jerome Sentimore Jr.

After his football career ended, Sentimore joined the Jefferson Parish Sheriff's Office for a career in law enforcement. His career corresponds to his major at the University of Tennessee, which was criminal justice.
