= 2010 Georgia Bulldogs football team =

American college football season

2010 Georgia Bulldogs football

Liberty Bowl, L 6–10 vs. UCF
- Conference: Southeastern Conference
- Eastern Division
- Record: 6–7 (3–5 SEC)
- Head coach: Mark Richt (10th season)
- Offensive coordinator: Mike Bobo (4th season)
- Offensive scheme: Pro-style
- Defensive coordinator: Todd Grantham (1st season)
- Base defense: 3–4
- Home stadium: Sanford Stadium

2010 Southeastern Conference football standings
	Conf.			Overall
Team	W		L	W		L
Eastern Division
No. 22 South Carolina x	5	–	3	9	–	5
Florida	4	–	4	8	–	5
Georgia	3	–	5	6	–	7
Tennessee	3	–	5	6	–	7
Kentucky	2	–	6	6	–	7
Vanderbilt	1	–	7	2	–	10
Western Division
No. 1 Auburn x$#	8	–	0	14	–	0
No. 8 LSU	6	–	2	11	–	2
No. 12 Arkansas %	6	–	2	10	–	3
No. 10 Alabama	5	–	3	10	–	3
No. 15 Mississippi State	4	–	4	9	–	4
Ole Miss*	1	–	7	4	–	8
Championship: Auburn 56, South Carolina 17
# – BCS National Champion; $ – BCS representative as conference champion; % – BCS at-large representative; x – Division champion/co-champions; * Ole Miss vacated all wins due to NCAA violations.; Rankings from AP Poll

The 2010 Georgia Bulldogs football team represented the University of Georgia in the 2010 NCAA Division I FBS football season. The Bulldogs competed in the East Division of the Southeastern Conference (SEC). This was the Georgia Bulldogs' tenth season for head coach Mark Richt. They finished the season 6–7, 3–5 in SEC play and were invited to the Liberty Bowl, where they were defeated by UCF, 10–6.

== Schedule ==
Date	Time	Opponent	Rank	Site	TV	Result	Attendance
September 4	12:21 p.m.	Louisiana–Lafayette*	No. 23	Sanford Stadium; Athens, GA	SECN	W 55–7	92,746
September 11	12:00 p.m.	at No. 24 South Carolina	No. 22	Williams-Brice Stadium; Columbia, SC (rivalry)	ESPN2	L 6–17	80,974
September 18	12:00 p.m.	No. 12 Arkansas		Sanford Stadium; Athens, GA	ESPN	L 24–31	92,746
September 25	7:00 p.m.	at Mississippi State		Davis Wade Stadium; Starkville, MS	SECRN	L 12–24	56,721
October 2	7:00 p.m.	at Colorado*		Folsom Field; Boulder, CO	FSN	L 27–29	52,855
October 9	12:21 p.m.	Tennessee		Sanford Stadium; Athens, GA (rivalry)	SECN	W 41–14	92,746
October 16	12:21 p.m.	Vanderbilt^{†}		Sanford Stadium; Athens, GA (rivalry)	SECN	W 43–0	92,746
October 23	7:30 p.m.	at Kentucky		Commonwealth Stadium; Lexington, KY	CSS	W 44–31	70,884
October 30	3:30 p.m.	vs. Florida		EverBank Field; Jacksonville, FL (rivalry)	CBS	L 31–34 ^{OT}	84,444
November 6	12:30 p.m.	Idaho State*		Sanford Stadium; Athens, GA	WSB	W 55–7	92,746
November 13	3:30 p.m.	at No. 2 Auburn		Jordan–Hare Stadium; Auburn, AL (Deep South's Oldest Rivalry)	CBS	L 31–49	87,451
November 27	7:45 p.m.	Georgia Tech*		Sanford Stadium; Athens, GA (Clean, Old-Fashioned Hate)	ESPN	W 42–34	92,746
December 31	3:30 p.m.	vs. No. 25 UCF*		Liberty Bowl Memorial Stadium; Memphis, TN (Liberty Bowl)	ESPN	L 6–10	51,231
*Non-conference game; ^{†}Homecoming; Rankings from AP Poll released prior to the game; All times are in Eastern time

=== Roster ===
2010 Georgia Bulldogs football team roster
Players			Coaches
Offense: Pos. / # / Name / Class; WR / 8 / A. J. Green / Jr	Defense: Pos. / # / Name / Class; LB / 42 / Justin Houston / Sr	Special teams: Pos. / # / Name / Class	Head coach: Mark Richt; Coordinators/assistant coaches Legend: (C) Team captain; (S) Suspended; (I) Ineligible; Injured; Redshirt

== Rankings ==
Ranking movements Legend: ██ Increase in ranking ██ Decrease in ranking — = Not ranked
	Week															
Poll	Pre	1	2	3	4	5	6	7	8	9	10	11	12	13	14	Final
AP	23	22	—	—	—	—	—	—	—	—	—	—	—	—	—	—
Coaches	21	19	—	—	—	—	—	—	—	—	—	—	—	—	—	—
Harris	Not released				—	—	—	—	—	—	—	—	—	—	—	Not released
BCS	Not released							—	—	—	—	—	—	—	—	Not released

== NFL draft ==
Player	Position	Round	Pick	NFL club	Ref
A. J. Green	Wide receiver	1	4	Cincinnati Bengals	
Justin Houston	Linebacker	3	70	Kansas City Chiefs	
Akeem Dent	Linebacker	3	91	Atlanta Falcons	
Clint Boling	Guard	3	101	Cincinnati Bengals	
Kris Durham	Wide receiver	4	107	Seattle Seahawks	
Shaun Chapas	Fullback	7	220	Dallas Cowboys	
