= Warren Norman =

American football player (born 1990)

No. 5, 27
- Position: Halfback

Personal information
- Born: December 30, 1990 (age 35); Stone Mountain, Georgia, U.S.
- Listed height: 5 ft 10 in (1.78 m)
- Listed weight: 205 lb (93 kg)

Career information
- High school: Chamblee
- College: Vanderbilt (2009-2012)
- NFL draft: 2012: undrafted

Awards and highlights
- Second-team All-SEC (2009); SEC Freshman of the Year (2009)

Warren Norman (born December 30, 1990) is an American former football player for the Vanderbilt Commodores. Norman was the 2009 Southeastern Conference Freshman Player of the Year according to the Associated Press and the SEC Head Coaches.

In the 2009 season, Norman broke Herschel Walker's SEC single-season freshman all-purpose yardage record, which Walker had held for 29 years. Norman had 1,941 all-purpose yards during the 2009 season. Also in the 2009 season, Norman tied for the Southeastern Conference (SEC) record for most kickoff returns for touchdowns in one season at three. He shares the record with Willie Gault of the University of Tennessee (1979–1982).

Norman, from Stone Mountain, Georgia, near Atlanta, attended and played athletics for Chamblee High School. In his senior year, he was named First Team All-Region 5-AAA and All-DeKalb County Running Back. In that season, he rushed for over 1,000 yards. In his junior year, he was recognized as All-State after rushing for more than 1,500 yards and 28 TDs and leading his team to a 12-2 record and the 5A state semifinals. That year, he had five touchdowns in one playoff game.

Chamblee High School Head Football Coach Mike Collins describes Norman's football skills: "On the field, Warren is a physical running back with the type of speed that can be hard to contain on the outside. He's a guy that runs through tackles, a hard guy to bring down. He also has great hands out of the backfield catching the football."
