= 2010 Nebraska Cornhuskers football team =

American college football season

2010 Nebraska Cornhuskers football

Big 12 North Division co-champion

Big 12 Championship vs. Oklahoma, L 20–23

Holiday Bowl vs. Washington, L 7–19
- Conference: Big 12 Conference
- North

Ranking
- Coaches: No. 19
- AP: No. 20
- Record: 10–4 (6–2 Big 12)
- Head coach: Bo Pelini (3rd season)
- Offensive coordinator: Shawn Watson (4th season)
- Offensive scheme: Spread
- Defensive coordinator: Carl Pelini (3rd season)
- Base defense: 4–2
- Home stadium: Memorial Stadium

2010 Big 12 Conference football standings
	Conf.			Overall
Team	W		L	W		L
North Division
No. 20 Nebraska xy	6	–	2	10	–	4
No. 18 Missouri x	6	–	2	10	–	3
Kansas State	3	–	5	7	–	6
Iowa State	3	–	5	5	–	7
Colorado	2	–	6	5	–	7
Kansas	1	–	7	3	–	9
South Division
No. 6 Oklahoma xy$	6	–	2	12	–	2
No. 13 Oklahoma State x	6	–	2	11	–	2
No. 19 Texas A&M x	6	–	2	9	–	4
Baylor	4	–	4	7	–	6
Texas Tech	3	–	5	8	–	5
Texas	2	–	6	5	–	7
Championship: Oklahoma 23, Nebraska 20
$ – BCS representative as conference champion; x – Division champion/co-champions; y – Championship game participant; Rankings from AP Poll

The 2010 Nebraska Cornhuskers football team represented the University of Nebraska–Lincoln in the 2010 NCAA Division I FBS football season. The team was coached by Bo Pelini and played their home games at Memorial Stadium in Lincoln, Nebraska. They were members of the North Division of the Big 12 Conference. It was Nebraska's 102nd and last season in the Big 12 (including years in the MVIAA/Big Eight) as they began competing in the Big Ten Conference in 2011.

The Cornhuskers finished the season 10–4, 6–2 in the Big 12 and were co champions of the North Division with Missouri. Due to their victory over Missouri, Nebraska represented the North Division in the 2010 Big 12 Championship Game where they were defeated by Oklahoma 20–23. They were invited to the Holiday Bowl for the second consecutive season and played Washington. Despite defeating the Huskies 56–21 during the regular season, the Cornhuskers were defeated 19–7.

== Before the season ==
The 2010 Cornhuskers took to the field on Saturday, September 4, 2010, against the Western Kentucky Hilltoppers. The Cornhuskers carried on despite losing a handful of key personnel losses to graduation after 2009, especially Heisman-candidate and #2 overall NFL draft pick DT Ndamukong Suh. The Nebraska coaching staff remained intact for the third straight year, since the return of Bo Pelini to the program.

During the spring of this year, several NCAA Football Bowl Subdivision teams began publicly discussing potential conference changes, which ultimately gained enough momentum to set off a chain reaction of university conference affiliation changes. On June 11, 2010, the University of Nebraska–Lincoln announced that its regents unanimously voted to end the university's affiliation with the Big 12 Conference, and would be joining the Big Ten Conference. The Big Ten Conference unanimously approved Nebraska's official application just hours later, and Nebraska announced that the Cornhusker athletic programs would transition into the Big Ten conference play schedule effective July 1, 2011. This is Nebraska's last year playing in the Big 12 Conference.

Nebraska's preseason #8 AP ranking was the highest starting rank for Nebraska since Eric Crouch's 2001 Heisman trophy season, which ultimately saw the Cornhuskers playing Miami in the BCS National Championship Game at the Rose Bowl.

=== Recruiting ===
College recruiting (2010)
Name	Hometown	School	Height	Weight	40^{‡}	Commit date
Walker Ashburn; DE	River Ridge, Louisiana	John Curtis	6 ft 3 in (1.91 m)	245 lb (111 kg)	4.74	Sep 8, 2009
Walker Ashburn; DE	Recruit ratings: Scout: Rivals: ESPN: (77)					
Kenny Bell; ATH	Boulder, Colorado	Fairview	6 ft 2 in (1.88 m)	173 lb (78 kg)	4.45	Jan 5, 2010
Kenny Bell; ATH	Recruit ratings: Scout: Rivals: ESPN: (76)					
Brion Carnes; QB	Bradenton, Florida	Manatee	6 ft 1 in (1.85 m)	181 lb (82 kg)	4.64	Feb 3, 2010
Brion Carnes; QB	Recruit ratings: Scout: Rivals: ESPN: (77)					
Corey Cooper; S	Maywood, Illinois	Proviso East	6 ft 2 in (1.88 m)	203 lb (92 kg)	4.38	Feb 3, 2010
Corey Cooper; S	Recruit ratings: Scout: Rivals: ESPN: (79)					
Jake Cotton; OL/DL	Lincoln, Nebraska	Lincoln Southeast	6 ft 7 in (2.01 m)	265 lb (120 kg)	4.75	Nov 9, 2009
Jake Cotton; OL/DL	Recruit ratings: Scout: Rivals:					
Lavonte David; LB	Miami, Florida	Fort Scott	6 ft 1 in (1.85 m)	214 lb (97 kg)	4.55	Dec 9, 2009
Lavonte David; LB	Recruit ratings: Scout: Rivals:					
Quincy Enunwa; WR	Moreno Valley, California	Rancho Verde	6 ft 2 in (1.88 m)	200 lb (91 kg)	4.58	Oct 26, 2009
Quincy Enunwa; WR	Recruit ratings: Scout: Rivals: ESPN: (76)					
Ciante Evans; CB	Arlington, Texas	Juan Seguin	5 ft 11 in (1.80 m)	170 lb (77 kg)	4.5	Sep 8, 2009
Ciante Evans; CB	Recruit ratings: Scout: Rivals: ESPN: (76)					
Tyler Evans; ATH	Waverly, Nebraska	Waverly	6 ft 2 in (1.88 m)	180 lb (82 kg)	4.48	Aug 5, 2009
Tyler Evans; ATH	Recruit ratings: Scout: Rivals:					
Jay Guy; DT	Aldine, Texas	Eisenhower	6 ft 1 in (1.85 m)	300 lb (140 kg)	5.1	Nov 8, 2009
Jay Guy; DT	Recruit ratings: Scout: Rivals: ESPN: (78)					
Jermarcus Hardrick; OT	Batesville, Mississippi	Fort Scott	6 ft 7 in (2.01 m)	315 lb (143 kg)	5	Dec 9, 2009
Jermarcus Hardrick; OT	Recruit ratings: Scout: Rivals:					
Chase Harper; TE	Pflugerville, Texas	Navarro JC	6 ft 6 in (1.98 m)	248 lb (112 kg)	Nov 11, 2009	
Chase Harper; TE	Recruit ratings: Scout: Rivals:					
Braylon Heard*; RB	Youngstown, Ohio	Cardinal Mooney	5 ft 11 in (1.80 m)	180 lb (82 kg)	4.4	Dec 29, 2009
Braylon Heard*; RB	Recruit ratings: Scout: Rivals: ESPN: (79)					
Harvey Jackson; S	Missouri City, Texas	Hightower	6 ft 2 in (1.88 m)	185 lb (84 kg)	4.6	Sep 6, 2009
Harvey Jackson; S	Recruit ratings: Scout: Rivals: ESPN: (76)					
Bronson Marsh; ATH	Omaha, Nebraska	Millard South	6 ft 1 in (1.85 m)	200 lb (91 kg)	4.5	Jan 26, 2010
Bronson Marsh; ATH	Recruit ratings: Scout: Rivals:					
Joshua Mitchell; CB	Corona, California	Eleanor Roosevelt	5 ft 11 in (1.80 m)	165 lb (75 kg)	4.4	Nov 8, 2009
Joshua Mitchell; CB	Recruit ratings: Scout: Rivals:					
Mike Moudy; OT	Castle Rock, Colorado	Douglas County	6 ft 7 in (2.01 m)	291 lb (132 kg)	5	Apr 18, 2009
Mike Moudy; OT	Recruit ratings: Scout: Rivals: ESPN: (77)					
Tobi Okuyemi; DE	Plymouth, Minnesota	Wayzata	6 ft 3 in (1.91 m)	250 lb (110 kg)	4.68	Nov 8, 2009
Tobi Okuyemi; DE	Recruit ratings: Scout: Rivals: ESPN: (77)					
Andrew Rodriguez; OT	Aurora, Nebraska	Aurora	6 ft 6 in (1.98 m)	298 lb (135 kg)	4.75	Nov 25, 2008
Andrew Rodriguez; OT	Recruit ratings: Scout: Rivals: ESPN: (80)					
Chase Rome; DE	Columbia, Missouri	Rock Bridge	6 ft 3 in (1.91 m)	290 lb (130 kg)	4.73	Oct 9, 2009
Chase Rome; DE	Recruit ratings: Scout: Rivals: ESPN: (79)					
Donovan Vestal; DE	Arlington, Texas	Bowie	6 ft 5 in (1.96 m)	240 lb (110 kg)	4.8	Aug 22, 2009
Donovan Vestal; DE	Recruit ratings: Scout: Rivals:					
Overall recruit ranking: Scout: 23 Rivals: 22
‡ Refers to 40-yard dash; Note: In many cases, Scout, Rivals, 247Sports, On3, and ESPN may conflict in their listings of height, weight and 40 time.; In these cases, the average was taken. ESPN grades are on a 100-point scale.; Sources: "Yahoo! Sports: Rivals.com 2010 Nebraska Commitments". Rivals.; "Scout.com 2010 Nebraska Commitments". Scout.; "ESPN 2010 Nebraska Commitments". ESPN.; "Scout.com Team Recruiting Rankings". Scout.; "2010 Team Ranking". Rivals.com.

== Schedule ==
Date	Time	Opponent	Rank	Site	TV	Result	Attendance
September 4	6:00 p.m.	Western Kentucky*	No. 8	Memorial Stadium; Lincoln, Nebraska	FSN PPV	W 49–10	85,555
September 11	11:30 a.m.	Idaho*	No. 6	Memorial Stadium; Lincoln, Nebraska	FSN PPV	W 38–17	85,732
September 18	2:30 p.m.	at Washington*	No. 8	Husky Stadium; Seattle	ABC/ESPN2	W 56–21	72,876
September 25	6:00 p.m.	South Dakota State*^{†}	No. 6	Memorial Stadium; Lincoln, Nebraska	FSN PPV	W 17–3	85,573
October 7	6:30 p.m.	at Kansas State	No. 7	Bill Snyder Family Football Stadium; Manhattan, Kansas (rivalry)	ESPN	W 48–13	51,015
October 16	2:30 p.m.	Texas	No. 5	Memorial Stadium; Lincoln, Nebraska	ABC/ESPN	L 13–20	85,648
October 23	2:30 p.m.	at No. 17 Oklahoma State	No. 14	Boone Pickens Stadium; Stillwater, Oklahoma	ABC	W 51–41	55,935
October 30	2:30 p.m.	No. 7 Missouri	No. 14	Memorial Stadium; Lincoln, Nebraska (rivalry)	ABC/ESPN	W 31–17	85,907
November 6	2:30 p.m.	at Iowa State	No. 9	Jack Trice Stadium; Ames, IA (rivalry)	ABC	W 31–30 ^{OT}	51,159
November 13	6:00 p.m.	Kansas	No. 9	Memorial Stadium; Lincoln, Nebraska (rivalry)	FSN PPV	W 20–3	85,587
November 20	7:00 p.m.	at No. 18 Texas A&M	No. 9	Kyle Field; College Station, Texas	ABC	L 6–9	90,079
November 26	2:30 p.m.	Colorado	No. 16	Memorial Stadium; Lincoln, Nebraska (rivalry)	ABC	W 45–17	85,646
December 4	7:00 p.m.	vs. No. 10 Oklahoma	No. 13	Cowboys Stadium; Arlington, Texas (Big 12 Championship Game) (rivalry)	ABC	L 20–23	78,802
December 30	9:00 p.m.	vs. Washington*	No. 18	Qualcomm Stadium; San Diego, California (Holiday Bowl)	ESPN	L 7–19	57,921
*Non-conference game; ^{†}Homecoming; Rankings from AP Poll released prior to the game; All times are in Central time

== Roster and coaching staff ==
2010 Nebraska Cornhuskers football team roster
Players
Coaches
Offense

Pos.	#	Name	Class
OL	70	Nick Ash	RFr
TE	82	Robert Barry	RFr
WR	80	Kenny Bell	Fr
WR	9	Joe Broekemeier	Sr
IB	22	Rex Burkhead	So
OL	58	Mike Caputo	Jr
QB	16	Brion Carnes	Fr
OL	51	Brandon Chapek	RFr
OL	77	Seung Hoon Choi	So
OL	72	Jesse Coffey	RFr
WR	1	Khiry Cooper	So
TE	81	Ben Cotton	So
OL	67	Scott Criss	RFr
WR	87	Taylor Dixon	So
WR	18	Quincy Enunwa	Fr
WR	88	Tyler Evans	Fr
WR	11	Curenski Gilleylen	Jr
QB	17	Cody Green	So
OL	50	Jermarcus Hardrick	Jr
IB	10	Roy Helu Jr. (C)	Sr
OL	74	Ricky Henry	Sr
WR	8	Will Henry	Sr
TE/FB	33	Ryan Hill	Jr
FB	34	Mitch Hron	RFr
WR	45	Keegan Hughes	Fr
WR	85	KC Hyland	So
WR	83	Stanley Jean-Baptiste	RFr
OL	55	Rob Jensen	Fr
IB	28	Austin Jones	Jr
OL	73	D.J. Jones	Sr
OL	52	Dwight Jones	RFr
OL	78	Marcel Jones	Jr
QB	12	Ron Kellogg III	RFr
TE	89	J.T. Kerr	RFr
WR	4	Ty Kildow	RFr
WR	84	Brandon Kinnie	Jr
QB	5	Zac Lee	Sr
FB	48	Tyler Legate	Jr
OL	75	Luke Lingenfelter	Jr
TE	41	Jake Long	RFr
OL	61	Spencer Long	RFr
WR	6	Tim Marlowe	So
FB	35	Jay Martin	Jr
QB	3	Taylor Martinez	RFr
TE	86	Mychael McClure	So
TE/WR	44	Mike McNeill	Sr
OL	57	Mike Moudy	Fr
OL	69	Brodrick Nickens	RFr
IB	29	Collins Okafor	So
WR	21	Steven Osborne	So
WR	24	Niles Paul	Sr
OL	56	Mark Pelini	Fr
OL	62	Cole Pensick	RFr
OL	76	Brent Qvale	RFr
TE	25	Kyler Reed	So
IB	27	Dontrayevous Robinson	So
OL	63	Andrew Rodriguez	Fr
WR	43	Dillon Schrodt	Fr
OL	71	Jeremiah Sirles	RFr
WR	39	Jacob Smith	Fr
OL	65	Mike Smith	Sr
QB	7	Kody Spano	So
RB	40	Zach Taylor	Fr
OL	79	Brandon Thompson	So
OL	59	Brian Thorson	So
IB	14	Lester Ward	So
QB	15	Latravis Washington	Sr
TE	47	Brett Wells	RFr
OL	68	Keith Williams	Sr
WR	26	Tyler Wullenwaber	Fr
TE	49	Dreu Young	Sr
FB	31	C.J. Zimmerer	RFr

Defense

Pos.	#	Name	Class
DE	95	Pierre Allen (C)	Sr
CB	21	Prince Amukamara (C)	Sr
DE	70	Kenny Anderson	So
DE	9	Jason Ankrah	RFr
DE	47	Walker Ashburn	Fr
DB	40	Josh Bart	Fr
CB	2	Antonio Bell	So
DB	39	Justin Blatchford	So
CB	14	Anthony Blue	Jr
S	8	Austin Cassidy	Jr
LB	51	Will Compton	So
DB	6	Corey Cooper	Fr
DT	96	Jake Cotton	Fr
DT	94	Jared Crick	Jr
LB	4	Lavonte David	Jr
CB	31	Jase Dean	So
CB	15	Alfonzo Dennard	Jr
S	32	Jim Ebke	Jr
DB	17	Ciante Evans	Fr
DE	92	Tyrone Fahie	Sr
DB	25	Joey Felici	Fr
LB	42	Sean Fisher	So
DB	30	Derek Foster	Fr
DE	80	Andy Gdowski	Fr
DB	7	DeJon Gomes	Sr
DB	11	Andrew Green	RFr
LB	41	Thomas Grove	Sr
DL	99	Jay Guy	Fr
DB	28	Eric Hagg	Sr
DB	35	Andrew Holt	Fr
DB	26	Harvey Jackson	Fr
DT	58	Justin Jackson	So
DB	29	Seth Jameson	RFr
DT	85	Faron Klingelhoefer	Jr
LB	44	Micah Kreikemeier	So
LB	37	Tyrone Lewis	RFr
LB	49	Matt Manninger	So
LB	46	Eric Martin	So
LB	36	Mathew May	Jr
DE	65	Colin McDermott	So
DE	89	Conor McDermott	So
LB	33	Tyson McGill	Fr
CB	32	Marcus Mendoza	Jr
DE	34	Cameron Meredith	So
CB	2	Lazarri Middleton	RFr
DB	18	Josh Mitchell	Fr
DT	68	Josh Molek	So
DE	52	J.C. Moore	Fr
DT	90	Terrence Moore	Jr
DB	43	Brent Moravec	So
DE	48	Tobi Okuyemi	Fr
S	12	Courtney Osborne	So
LB	56	Devin Paulsen	RFr
DL	53	Thaddeus Randle	RFr
DB	19	Wil Richards	RFr
LB	54	Trevor Roach	Fr
DT	97	Chase Rome	Fr
S	13	P.J. Smith	So
LB	59	Colby Starkebaum	RFr
DT	55	Baker Steinkuhler	So
LB	38	Graham Stoddard	So
S	3	Rickey Thenarse	Sr
DE	37	Kevin Thomsen	Jr
DB	23	Lance Thorell	Jr
DL	61	Jeff Uher	Fr
DE	91	Donovan Vestal	Fr
DB	38	Yusef Wade	Fr
CB	10	Dijon Washington	RFr
DB	16	Adam Watson	Sr
DB	5	Anthony West	Sr
LB	45	Alonzo Whaley	So
DB	24	Austin Williams	Fr
DE	98	Josh Williams	So

Special teams

Pos.	#	Name	Class
P/PK	27	Jon Damkroger	Jr
PK/P	97	Jason Dann	Fr
LS	66	Beaux Greenfield	Fr
PK/P	90	Alex Henery (C)	Sr
PK	1	Adi Kunalic	Sr
P/PK	96	Brett Maher	So
LS	92	P.J. Mangieri	So
LS/LB	67	Sam Meginnis	So

Head coach

- Bo Pelini
  3rd season
  4th year at Nebraska
  Alma mater: Ohio State

Coordinators/assistant coaches

- Shawn Watson
  4th season as OC/QB coach
  5th year at Nebraska
  Alma mater: Southern Illinois
- Carl Pelini
  3rd season as DC/DL coach
  3rd year at Nebraska
  Alma mater: Youngstown State
- Tim Beck
  3rd season as RB coach
  3rd year at Nebraska
  Alma mater: Central Florida
- Ron Brown
  3rd season as TE coach
  20th year at Nebraska
  Alma mater: Brown
- Barney Cotton
  3rd season as AHC/OL coach
  4th year at Nebraska
  Alma mater: Nebraska
- Mike Ekeler
  3rd season as LB coach
  3rd year at Nebraska
  Alma mater: Kansas State
- Ted Gilmore
  3rd season as AHC/Rec coach
  6th year at Nebraska
  Alma mater: Wyoming
- John Papuchis
  3rd season as DE/ST coach
  3rd year at Nebraska
  Alma mater: Virginia Tech
- Marvin Sanders
  3rd season as Sec coach
  4th year at Nebraska
  Alma mater: Nebraska
- James Dobson
  3rd season as S&C coach
  3rd year at Nebraska
  Alma mater: Wisconsin
- Curt Baldus
  3rd season as GA coach
  4th year at Nebraska
  Alma mater: St. Cloud State
- Ross Watson
  3rd season as GA coach
  3rd year at Nebraska
  Alma mater: Mount Union

Legend

- (C) Team captain
- (S) Suspended
- (I) Ineligible
- Injured
- Redshirt

Roster
Last update: January 10, 2011

Defense

NICKEL
Eric Hagg
Austin Cassidy
⋅

FS
DeJon Gomes
D-Courtney Osborne
Anthony West

WILL	MIKE
Eric Martin; Will Compton (injured)	Lavonte David
Alonzo Whaley	Mathew May
⋅	⋅

SS
Austin Cassidy
Rickey Thenarse
D-P.J Smith
⋅

CB
Alfonzo Dennard
Antonio Bell
⋅

DE	DT	DT	DE
Cameron Meredith	Baker Steinkuler	Jared Crick	Pierre Allen
Josh Williams	Terrence Moore	Thad Randle	Jason Ankrah
⋅	⋅	⋅	⋅

CB
Prince Amukamara
Ciante Evans
⋅

Offense

WR
Niles Paul
Joe Broekemeier
⋅

WR
Brandon Kinnie
Will Henry
⋅

LT	LG	C	RG	RT
Jeremiah Sirles	Keith Williams	Mike Caputo	Ricky Henry	D.J Jones
Jermarcus Hardrick	Andrew Rodriguez	Cole Pensick	Brent Qvale	Marcel Jones
⋅	⋅	⋅	⋅	⋅

TE
Kyler Reed
Ben Cotton
Jake Long
⋅

WR
Mike McNeil
Quincy Enunwa
⋅

QB
Taylor Martinez
Cody Green
Zac Lee

Key reserves
FB Tyler Legate
FB C.J Zimmerer
FB Ryan Hill

Special teams
PK Alex Henery
P Alex Henery
KR Niles Paul
PR Niles Paul
LS P.J. Mangieri

RB
Roy Helu
Rex Burkhead
Dontrayevous Robinson

== Game summaries ==
=== Western Kentucky ===
Western Kentucky at Nebraska

Team	1	2	3	4	Total
Western Kentucky	0	0	3	7	10
• #8 Nebraska	14	7	14	14	49

- Date: September 4
- Location: Memorial Stadium, Lincoln, Nebraska
- Game start: 6:10 p.m. CST
- Elapsed time: 3:04
- Game attendance: 85,555
- Game weather: Sunny, 78 °F (26 °C), Wind S@12 mph (19 km/h), 52% Humidity
- Referee: Cooper Castleberry
- TV announcers (FSN PPV): Ron Thulin (Play-by-play), Rich Baldinger (Color) & Brent Stover (Sideline)

This was the first ever meeting of the Hilltoppers and Cornhuskers. Redshirt freshman QB Taylor Martinez was not revealed as the starter for Nebraska until kickoff, and subsequently became the first freshman quarterback to open a Nebraska season in the history of the program. On his first carry, Martinez rushed for 46 yards and a touchdown, allowing for Nebraska to extend its ongoing NCAA record of consecutive season-opening victories to 25. Martinez's 129 rushing yards on the day also marked the first time a Nebraska QB exceeded 100 yards on the ground since 2003, and this was accomplished while sharing snaps with the second and third-string quarterbacks. The 2010 Blackshirts debut was marred somewhat when they allowed the Western Kentucky squad, which had lost their last 20 games in a row prior to this game, to accumulate 299 all-purpose yards, mostly during a second-half defensive letdown.

=== Idaho ===
Idaho at Nebraska

Team	1	2	3	4	Total
Idaho	0	3	7	7	17
• #6 Nebraska	3	28	7	0	38

- Date: September 11
- Location: Memorial Stadium, Lincoln, Nebraska
- Game start: 11:39 a.m. CST
- Elapsed time: 2:57
- Game attendance: 85,732
- Game weather: Sunny, Clear, 73 °F (23 °C), Wind WNW@5–10 mph (8.0–16.1 km/h)
- Referee: Dan Romeo
- TV announcers (FSN PPV): Dave Armstrong (Play-by-play), Gary Reasons (Color) & Brent Stover (Sideline)

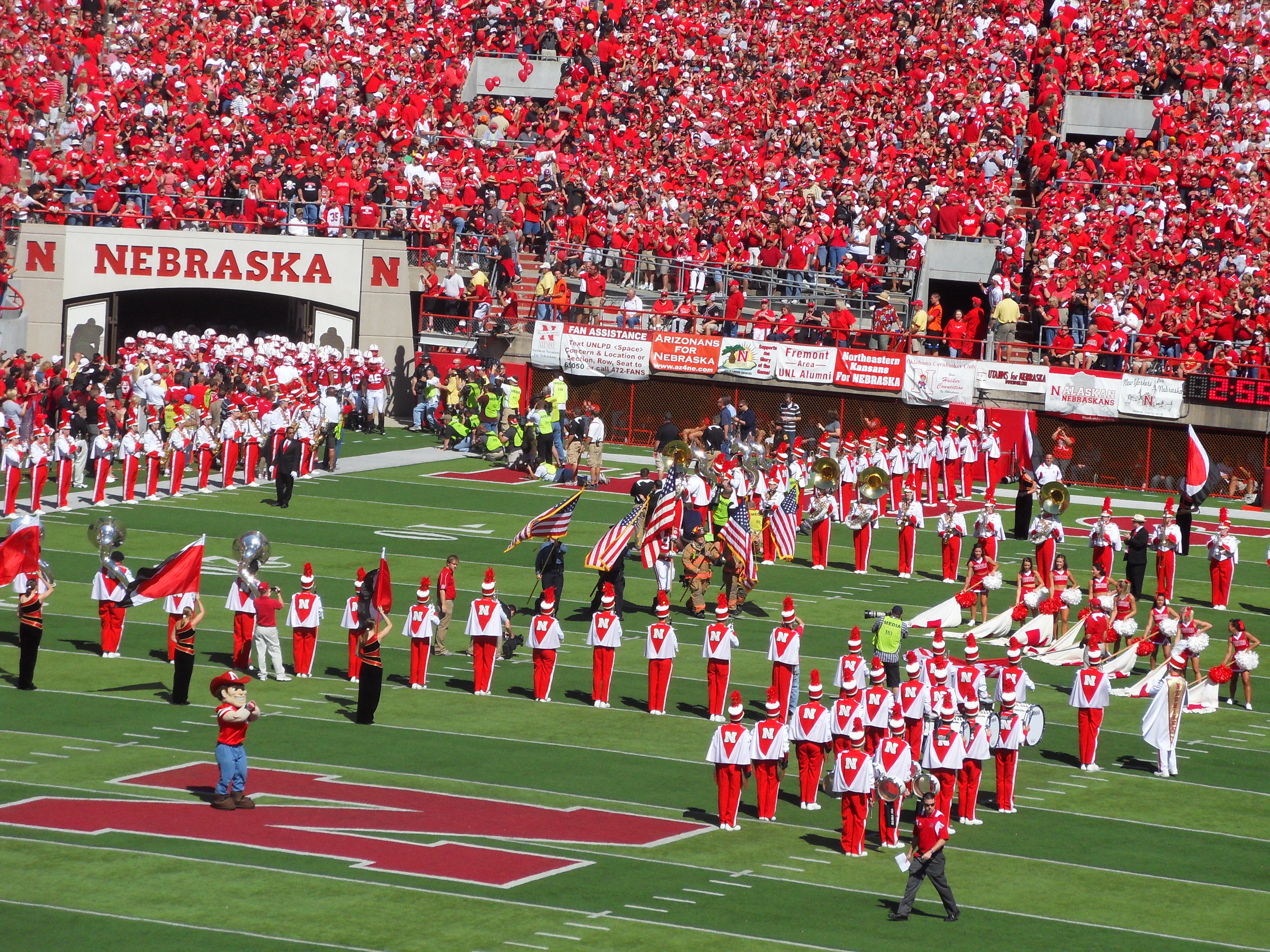
Remembering 9/11 during the tunnel walk

For the sixth straight year, Nebraska opened the season 2–0. The 38–17 defeat of the Idaho Vandals in the first ever meeting of these teams improved the Cornhuskers to 22–1 against WAC opponents all-time. The Nebraska defense held the Vandals to just 60 yards on the ground and 279 total yards, while notching seven sacks for 80 yards lost. The Blackshirts intercepted five passes, three of which were converted into scores. A 28–3 scoring output in the 2nd quarter allowed the Cornhuskers to run away with the game and play some reserve personnel, which allowed the Vandals to outscore Nebraska 14–7 in the second half. The Nebraska offense recorded 471 all-purpose yards. The home field win was Nebraska's 375th at Memorial Stadium, and the 500th home win in Lincoln all-time. Nebraska redshirt freshman QB Taylor Martinez had a second straight 100-yard rushing game, and his 67-yard second-quarter touchdown was the longest by a Nebraska QB since a 70-yard dash by Eric Crouch against Colorado in 2001. Cornhusker PK Alex Henery accounted for eight points on the day, which was enough to make him the fifth Nebraska player to ever exceed 300 career points. Despite the win, Nebraska slipped from #6 to #8 in the AP Poll following the game.

=== Washington, September 2010 ===
Nebraska at Washington

Team	1	2	3	4	Total
• #8 Nebraska	14	14	21	7	56
Washington	7	7	7	0	21

- Date: September 18
- Location: Husky Stadium, Seattle
- Game start: 2:37 p.m. CST
- Elapsed time: 3:06
- Game attendance: 72,876
- Game weather: Scattered Clouds, 66 °F (19 °C), Wind: Variable
- Referee: Jack Wood
- TV announcers (ABC): Sean McDonough (Play-by-play), Matt Millen (Color) & Shelley Smith (Sideline)

The game against Washington was led by Steve Sarkisian, who took over in 2009. This was Nebraska's first road game of the 2010 season. The game featured redshirt freshman Martinez QB Washington QB Jake Locker.

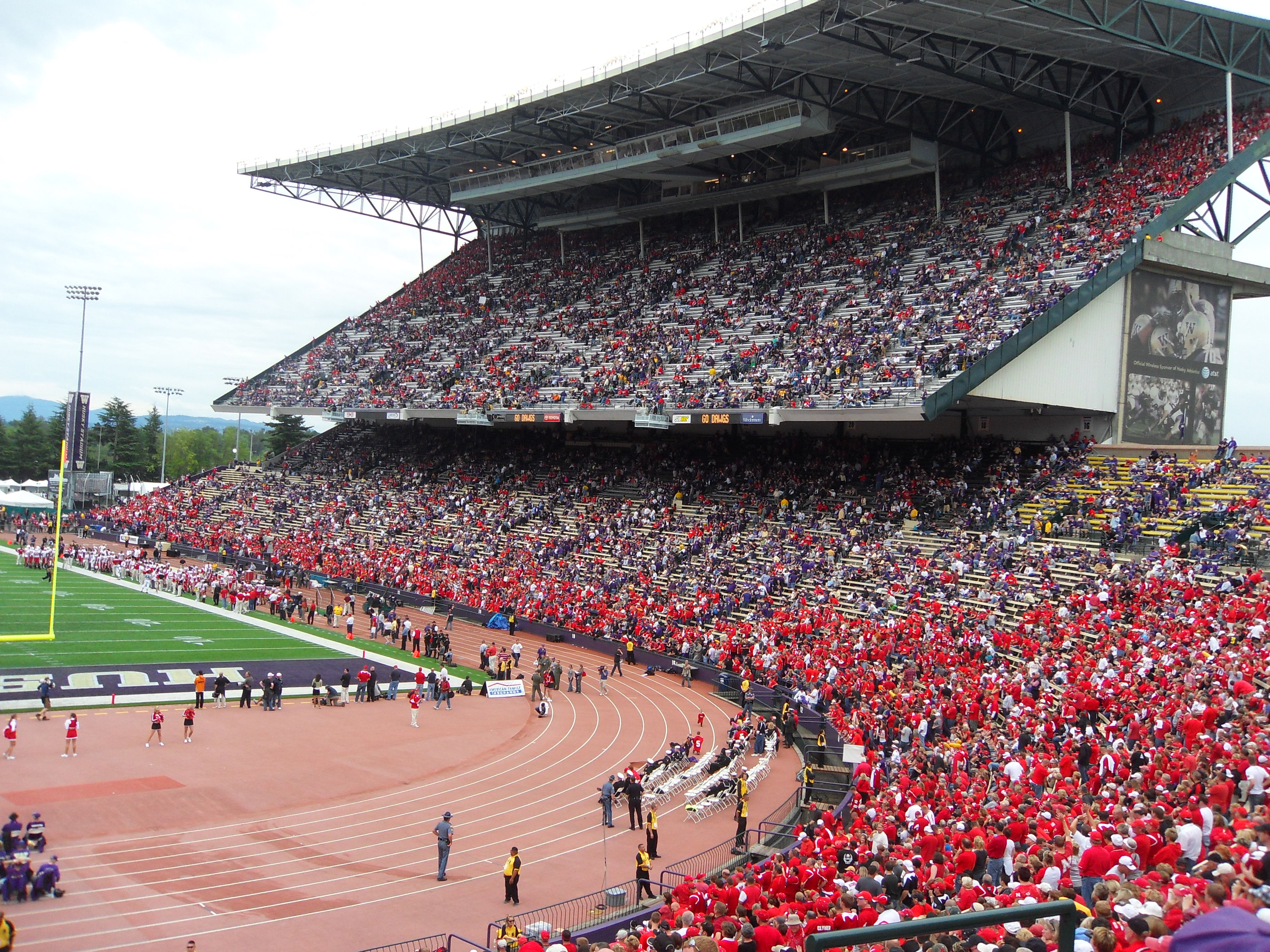
Early in the 4th quarter as Husker fans stay until the end of the game

Washington received the ball to start the game but gave up an interception four plays later, just 1:35 into the game. Shortly thereafter Nebraska scored a touchdown and never gave up the lead for the rest of the game. The Cornhuskers finished the day with 533 all-purpose yards, more than double Washington's totals in each category. This included three Nebraska players totaling over 100 yards of rushing, an accomplishment not met since 2001 and only the fourth time ever in program history. It was also the first time Washington had ever allowed three opponent players to exceed 100 rushing yards. The Cornhusker offense managed over 13 yards per pass attempt and over 7 yards per rush attempt, while the 56 total Nebraska points was the most points ever scored by a non-conference opponent in Husky Stadium's 90-year history, also tying the most points ever scored there by a Washington conference opponent. An 80-yard touchdown run in the 3rd quarter by Nebraska QB Taylor Martinez was the longest TD run by a freshman QB, and the second-longest run by any Nebraska QB, in program history. The Blackshirts coverage prevented the Huskies from ever getting consistent momentum, and Locker ended the day only 4 of 20 in the air for 70 yards and two interceptions, one of which was returned for a Nebraska TD by junior CB Alfonzo Dennard. Washington did manage to end Nebraska's 10-game streak of holding opponents to 20 points. Nebraska took over the series by moving to 4–3–1 against Washington all time.

=== South Dakota State ===
South Dakota State at Nebraska

Team	1	2	3	4	Total
South Dakota State	0	0	3	0	3
• #6 Nebraska	0	14	0	3	17

- Date: September 25
- Location: Memorial Stadium, Lincoln, Nebraska
- Game start: 6:08 p.m. CST
- Elapsed time: 2:55
- Game attendance: 85,573
- Game weather: Sunny, 64 °F (18 °C), Winds ENE@10 mph (16 km/h)
- Referee: Rick Loumiet
- TV announcers (FSN PPV): Ron Thulin (Play-by-play), Kelly Stouffer (Color) & Jim Rose (Sideline)

Meeting for the first time since a 58–7 Nebraska victory in 1963, the FCS South Dakota State Jackrabbits entered the game at 0–2. The 307th consecutive sellout crowd at Memorial Stadium was the largest crowd that the Jackrabbits team had ever played in front of, and the last two teams to hold Nebraska to fewer than 17 points had been the #20 Oklahoma Sooners and #3 Texas Longhorns. The game was closer than the 17–3 score would indicate, as the Jackrabbits had two touchdowns nullified by penalties, one of them on an interception returned 66 yards to the end zone. Both teams suffered two interceptions each and Nebraska offered up four fumbles on the day, losing one of them to a fumble-free South Dakota State. Nebraska held the time of possession edge on the game by 11 seconds, and converted four of thirteen third downs. Cornhusker head coach Pelini summed up the Nebraska effort after the game, saying "We were a bad team." Nonetheless, the win moved the Cornhuskers to 2–0 over the Jackrabbits all time, and put Nebraska at 4–0 for the first time since 2005.

=== Kansas State ===
Nebraska at Kansas State

Team	1	2	3	4	Total
• #7 Nebraska	7	10	21	10	48
Kansas State	0	3	3	7	13

- Date: October 7
- Location: Bill Snyder Family Football Stadium, Manhattan, Kansas
- Game start: 6:30 p.m. CST
- Elapsed time: 3:11
- Game attendance: 51015
- Game weather: Clear, 79 °F (26 °C), Winds E@7 mph (11 km/h)
- Referee: Randy Christal
- TV announcers (ESPN): Rece Davis (Play-by-play), Craig James (Color), Jesse Palmer (Color) & Jenn Brown (Sideline)

Nebraska met Kansas State in Manhattan to open the final Cornhusker Big 12 Conference slate and the 95th time the teams had met. Redshirt freshman Nebraska QB Taylor Martinez bounced back from his lackluster appearance in the previous contest against South Dakota State, rushing for four touchdowns and 241 yards to set a new all-time Cornhusker quarterback single-game rushing record. His 370 total yards on the day were the most all-purpose yards set by a Cornhusker freshman at any position in nineteen years. Martinez's efforts helped Nebraska to tally more yards against Kansas State than any other opponent in twenty one years. The Wildcat offense seemed to have success to start the game, marching down the field on their first possession, until they were stopped on a 4th-and-2 in the Nebraska red zone with no points to show for it. The Blackshirts subsequently took control of the game defensively, notching their 13th straight game holding an opponent to 21 points or less and helping the Cornhuskers to hand Kansas State head coach Bill Snyder a home field loss, in the stadium named after him, on his 71st birthday. The Nebraska win moved the Cornhuskers to 5–0 for the first time since 2003, and the series between the programs drew to a close with a Nebraska advantage of 78–15–2.

=== Texas ===
Texas at Nebraska

Team	1	2	3	4	Total
• Texas	10	7	3	0	20
#5 Nebraska	0	3	3	7	13

- Date: October 16
- Location: Memorial Stadium, Lincoln, Nebraska
- Game start: 2:34 p.m. CST
- Elapsed time: 3:16
- Game attendance: 85,648
- Game weather: Sunny, 75 °F (24 °C), Winds NNE@8 mph (13 km/h), Humidity 39%
- Referee: Greg Burks
- TV announcers (ABC/ESPN): Sean McDonough (Play-by-play), Matt Millen (Color) & Quint Kessenich (Sideline)

The teams came head-to-head for the 14th time with Texas defeating #5 Nebraska in Lincoln. The loss left Nebraska with a 4–10 record against Texas all time, and just 1–9 in the last ten attempts. With Nebraska's departure from the Big 12 Conference following this season, this was the last regular season league meeting of these teams.

=== Oklahoma State ===
Nebraska at Oklahoma State

Team	1	2	3	4	Total
• #14 Nebraska	14	17	10	10	51
#17 Oklahoma State	13	14	7	7	41

- Date: October 23
- Location: Boone Pickens Stadium, Stillwater, Oklahoma
- Game start: 2:30 p.m. CST
- Elapsed time: 3:34
- Game attendance: 55,935
- Game weather: Fair and Cloudy, 64 °F (18 °C), Winds SSW@16 mph (26 km/h)
- Referee: Tom Walker
- TV announcers (ABC): Ron Franklin (Play-by-play), Ed Cunningham (Color) & Jeannine Edwards (Sideline)

The Cornhuskers traveled to Stillwater following a disappointing loss to Texas the week prior, hoping to bounce back against their first ranked opponent of the year, the #17 Oklahoma State Cowboys. Nebraska QB Taylor Martinez eclipsed the 300-yard mark through the air for the first time in his career, passing for 323 yards and five touchdowns, while adding 112 yards on the ground.

Nebraska's victory improved the Cornhuskers' series lead to 37–5–1, but was only Nebraska's second win in the last five matches between the squads. Their first win in Stillwater since 1995. With Nebraska's departure from the Big 12 Conference following this season, this was the last league meeting of these teams in a series that dates back to when the Cowboys briefly joined the MVIAA from 1925 to 1928. Oklahoma State later returned to the league for good in 1958, leading the conference to be known as the "Big 8" for the first time.

=== Missouri ===
Missouri at Nebraska

Team	1	2	3	4	Total
#7 Missouri	0	7	10	0	17
• #14 Nebraska	24	0	7	0	31

- Date: October 30
- Location: Memorial Stadium, Lincoln, Nebraska
- Game start: 2:36 p.m. CST
- Elapsed time: 3:26
- Game attendance: 85,907
- Game weather: Clear, 67 °F (19 °C), Winds NE@12 mph (19 km/h)
- Referee: Randy Christal
- TV announcers (ABC/ESPN): Ron Franklin (Play-by-play), Ed Cunningham (Color) & Jeannine Edwards (Sideline)

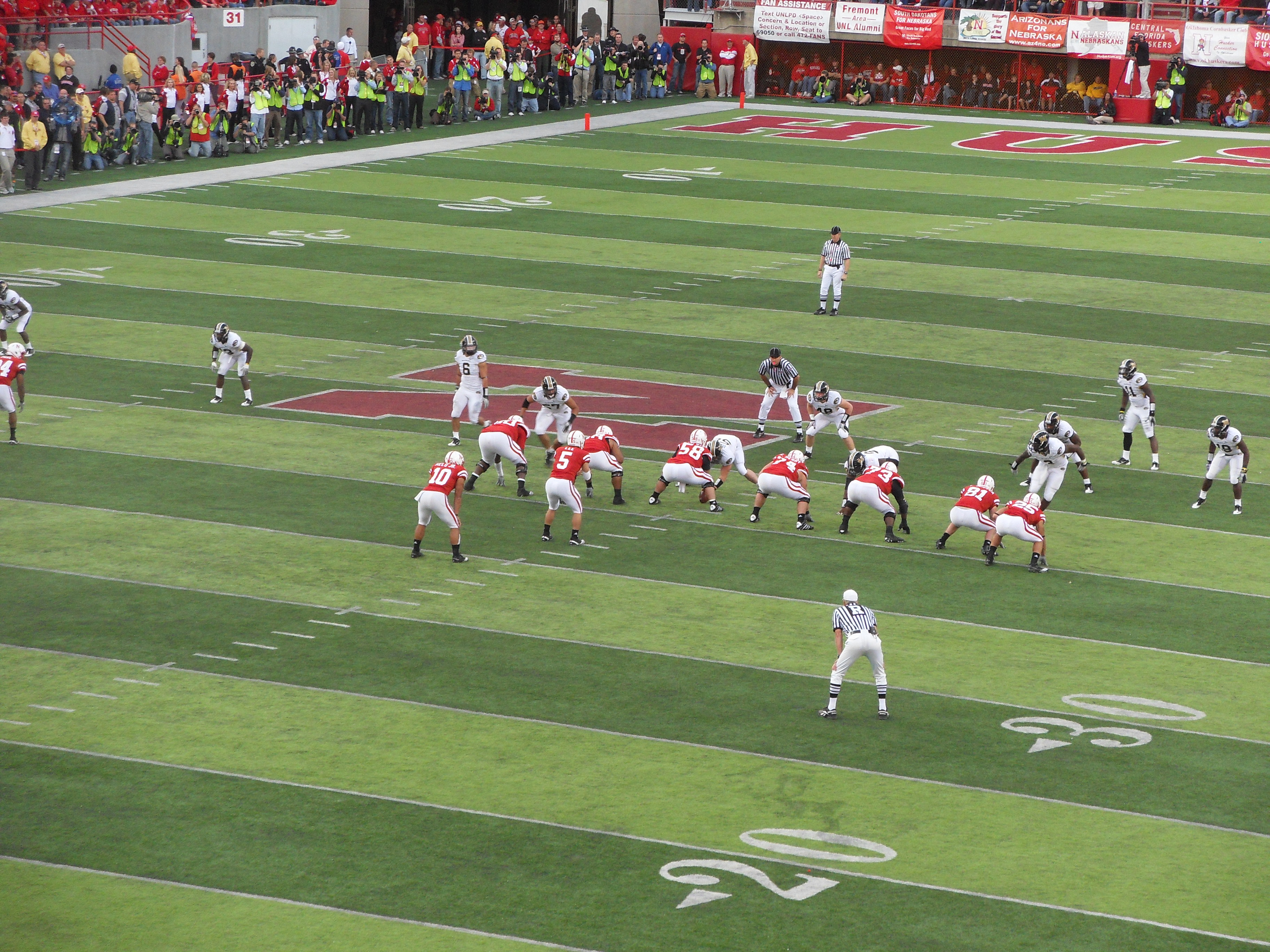

#7 Missouri arrived in Lincoln to take on Nebraska for the 104th contest between the schools since 1892, trying to make progress to catch up to Nebraska in the series. The Tigers trail behind the Cornhuskers 36–65–3 all-time.

Nebraska's withdrawal from Big 12 play after this year ends a historical league affiliation with the Tigers that dates to 1892, when these two programs joined with Kansas and Iowa to form the Western Interstate University Football Association (WIUFA). Though the WIUFA disbanded after six seasons, all four WIUFA teams came together again with the formation of the MVIAA in 1907. The conclusion of the 2010 season will mark the end of a 103-year continuous conference partnership, and leaves the fate of the Victory Bell in question.

=== Iowa State ===
Nebraska at Iowa State

Team	1	2	3	4	OT	Total
• #9 Nebraska	0	7	17	0	7	31
Iowa State	0	10	0	14	6	30

- Date: November 6
- Location: Jack Trice Stadium, Ames, IA
- Game start: 2:30 p.m. CST
- Elapsed time: 3:18
- Game attendance: 51,159
- Game weather: Mostly Sunny, 54 °F (12 °C), Winds SSE@15 mph (24 km/h)
- Referee: Greg Burks
- TV announcers (ABC): Dave Pasch (Play-by-play), Bob Griese (Color), Chris Spielman (Color) & Quint Kessenich (Sideline)

Second-year Iowa State Head Coach Paul Rhoads hosted Nebraska in Ames for the first time, as the squads come together for their 105th contest. With Nebraska leaving Big 12 play after this season, this game marked the end of a historical series and conference relationship dating back to 1896, almost as far back as the Nebraska-Missouri series. Nebraska, who leads the all-time series 86–17–2, avenged last year's 7–9 loss, which was Iowa State's first win in Lincoln in 34 years. Nebraska and Iowa State traded scores in the 4th quarter before Nebraska led 31–24 in the final minutes. Iowa State scored a touchdown to make the score 31–30 Nebraska leading. ISU Head Coach Paul Rhoads called a 2-point conversion. With the game on the line, ISU QB Austen Arnaud threw a pass that got intercepted by Nebraska DB Eric Hagg to give Nebraska the overtime win in Ames.

=== Kansas ===
Kansas at Nebraska

Team	1	2	3	4	Total
Kansas	0	0	3	0	3
• #9 Nebraska	7	7	3	3	20

- Date: November 13
- Location: Memorial Stadium, Lincoln, Nebraska
- Game start: 6:09 p.m. CST
- Elapsed time: 2:37
- Game attendance: 85,587
- Game weather: Clear, 34 °F (1 °C), Winds NNW@5-10 mph (16 km/h), Humidity 84%
- Referee: Karl Richins
- TV announcers (FSN PPV): Dave Armstrong (Play-by-play), Gary Reasons (Color) & Jim Rose (Sideline)

Kansas traveled to Lincoln to play the 105th and last game in the NCAA-record longest consecutive season series in all of college football. This game marked the 117th time overall that the teams have come together to settle things on the field. Nebraska's victory leaves the series closed for now with a decisive Cornhusker advantage of 91–23–3. It was the first meeting between Kansas and Nebraska since the Jayhawk program was taken over by former legendary Nebraska quarterback Turner Gill.

The departure of Nebraska from the Big 12 marked this game as the probable last game of one of the longest continuous series in the history of NCAA college football, as Kansas and Nebraska have met on the field every year without interruption since 1903, and failed to meet in only two seasons overall since 1892.

=== Texas A&M ===
Nebraska at Texas A&M

Team	1	2	3	4	Total
#9 Nebraska	3	0	0	3	6
• #18 Texas A&M	0	3	0	6	9

- Date: November 20
- Location: Kyle Field, College Station, Texas
- Game start: 7:12 p.m. CST
- Elapsed time: 3:05
- Game attendance: 90,079
- Game weather: 70 °F (21 °C), Winds SE@9 mph (14 km/h), Humidity 71%
- Referee: Greg Burks
- TV announcers (ABC): Brent Musburger (Play-by-play), Kirk Herbstreit (Color) & Heather Cox (Sideline)

With Nebraska's departure from the Big 12 Conference following this season, this was the last league meeting of these two teams. The Cornhuskers were penalized 16 times for 145 yards and lost the game 9–6. Several of the calls were controversial, and played key role in the outcome of the game. For example, Texas A&M player Tony Jerod-Eddie grabbed and squeezed the testicles of Nebraska player Ben Cotton when he recovered a fumble, and Cotton was flagged 15 yards when he tried to protect himself.

Following the Cornhuskers' defeat by the Aggies, Nebraska Defensive Coordinator Carl Pelini was involved in an incident with Brandon Jones, a co-owner of a Texas A&M sports site, TexAgs. The photographer stated that Pelini had seized Brandon's camera and broken several pieces from it before throwing them to the ground. Video shows Pelini rushing towards the photographer and camera.

=== Colorado ===
Colorado at Nebraska

Team	1	2	3	4	Total
Colorado	0	3	14	0	17
• #15 Nebraska	3	14	21	7	45

- Date: November 26
- Location: Memorial Stadium, Lincoln, Nebraska
- Game start: 2:37 p.m. CST
- Elapsed time: 3:11
- Game attendance: 85,646
- Game weather: Sunny, 49 °F (9 °C), Winds WNW@17 mph (27 km/h), Humidity 37%
- Referee: Rick Loumiet
- TV announcers (ABC): Ron Franklin (Play-by-play), Ed Cunningham (Color) & Jeannine Edwards (Sideline)

Scoring summary
1	5:13	NEB	Alex Henery 42-yard field goal	NEB 3–0
2	13:47	NEB	Rex Burkhead 2-yard run (Alex Henery kick)	NEB 10–0
2	10:22	COL	Aric Goodman 22-yard field goal	NEB 10–3
2	0:49	NEB	Brandon Kinnie 26-yard pass from Rex Burkhead (Alex Henery kick)	NEB 17–3
3	11:58	NEB	Brandon Kinnie 16-yard pass from Cody Green (Alex Henery kick)	NEB 24–3
3	10:53	NEB	Kyler Reed 4-yard pass from Rex Burkhead (Alex Henery kick)	NEB 31–3
3	8:19	COL	Paul Richardson 50-yard pass from Cody Hawkins (Aric Goodman kick)	NEB 31–10
3	3:38	NEB	Kyler Reed 1-yard pass from Cody Green (Alex Henery kick)	NEB 38–10
3	0:00	COL	Will Jefferson 29-yard pass from Cody Hawkins (Aric Goodman kick)	NEB 38–17
4	12:55	NEB	Cody Green 1-yard run (Alex Henery kick)	NEB 45–17

Colorado traveled to Lincoln as both teams closed their regular seasons. Nebraska steadily pulled away for the win to clinch the Big 12 Conference North Division Title and a berth in the Big 12 Championship game. Colorado was denied a sixth win for the season and did not attain bowl eligibility, making this the final game of their 2010 season. As 2010 was the final year for both teams in the Big 12, the long-running series has drawn to a close with Nebraska in command at 49–18–2.

=== Oklahoma ===
Nebraska vs. Oklahoma

Team	1	2	3	4	Total
#13 Nebraska	10	10	0	0	20
• #9 Oklahoma	0	17	3	3	23

- Date: December 4
- Location: Cowboys Stadium, Arlington, Texas
- Game start: 7:06 p.m. CST
- Elapsed time: 3:37
- Game attendance: 78,802
- Game weather: (indoors)
- Referee: Scott Novak
- TV announcers (ABC): Brent Musburger (Play-by-play), Kirk Herbstreit (Color) & Holly Rowe (Sideline)

For the second year in a row, Nebraska appeared in the Big 12 football championship game. The team would play their final game as members of the Big 12 against Oklahoma in Arlington, Texas. Nebraska led 17–0 at one point in the first half, before Oklahoma reeled off 17 points of their own. A field goal just before halftime sent Nebraska into halftime with a 20–17 lead. In the second half, Oklahoma held Nebraska scoreless for the first time of the season and managed two field goals in each of the latter periods to win 23–20. Nebraska had 4 turnovers in the game and Oklahoma held a 453–293 yard disadvantage.

=== Washington–Holiday Bowl ===
Nebraska vs. Washington

Team	1	2	3	4	Total
#18 Nebraska	0	7	0	0	7
• Washington	10	0	7	2	19

- Date: December 30
- Location: Qualcomm Stadium, San Diego
- Game start: 9:15 p.m. CST
- Elapsed time: 3:16
- Game attendance: 57,921
- Game weather: Partly cloudy, 48 °F (9 °C), Winds NNW@5 mph (8.0 km/h)
- Referee: Land Clark
- TV announcers (ESPN): Chris Fowler (Play-by-play), Todd Blackledge (Color) & Erin Andrews (Sideline)

Following Nebraska's loss to Oklahoma, Nebraska was selected as the Big 12's representative at the 2010 Holiday Bowl, which also chose the Washington squad beaten by Nebraska in September, now 6–6, to appear as the final opponent in the Cornhuskers 2010 season. This was Nebraska's second straight Holiday Bowl appearance. Washington had rebounded from a 3–6 start and the demoralizing early season loss to Nebraska, winning out the rest of their season to earn a bowl bid. The Huskies held Nebraska to a single first-half touchdown on their way to winning 19–7.

== Rankings ==
Ranking movements Legend: ██ Increase in ranking ██ Decrease in ranking ( ) = First-place votes
	Week															
Poll	Pre	1	2	3	4	5	6	7	8	9	10	11	12	13	14	Final
AP	8	6	8	6	6	7	5	14	14	9	9	9	16	13	17	20
Coaches	9	7	8	7	6	6	4 (2)	13	12	10	8	9	15	13	16	19
Harris	Not released						5	34	14	11	9	9	15	13	17	Not released
BCS	Not released							16	14	7	8	8	15	13	18	Not released

== After the season ==
Although there were high hopes for the year, three major goals were not achieved and resulted in a season that ended with a note of disappointment. After the last-second, one-point loss to Texas in the 2009 Big 12 Championship Game, the squad looked forward to a chance to avenge the loss against the Longhorns and to return to the league title game for the final Big 12 conference championship. The 2010 Big 12 Championship game was the last league title game for the foreseeable future, as the departure of Nebraska and Colorado from the league dropped the number of members to ten, which is not enough to hold a title game under NCAA rules.

Texas started the season flat and had to face unbeaten Nebraska in Lincoln, which led many media analysts to predict an easy Nebraska win. Instead, Texas took advantage of Cornhusker mistakes to deny Nebraska a win in the final foreseeable match between the teams. The Cornhuskers remained on track for an appearance in the Big 12 championship game, clinching an appearance against historical rival Oklahoma. The Cornhuskers started strong and led 17–0 in the second quarter before the Sooners rallied for 23 points while holding Nebraska to just one more field goal. Having also lost to Texas A&M in the regular season, the 10–3 Nebraska team was invited to the Holiday Bowl for a rematch with Washington.

Head coach Bo Pelini, 3–0 in bowls all time, was handed his first ever bowl loss at the hands of an inspired Husky squad, and Nebraska suffered its third loss in the previous four games, a mark last seen since the first part of 2008. Nonetheless, Pelini's overall record improved on the season, to 30–12 (.714) overall, and 17–7 (.708) in the Big 12, and his team won the Big 12 North Division title in each of his three seasons at the helm so far. This was not as successful a start as the programs of successful former head coaches Bob Devaney, Tom Osborne, or Frank Solich, but was a dramatic improvement over the first three years of his immediate predecessor, Bill Callahan. Callahan managed to get to just 22–15 (.595) overall and 13–11 (.542) in the league, with only a single division championship. Although 2010 ended on a disappointing note following Pelini's 2009 proclamation that "Nebraska was back", it was apparent that Nebraska's fortunes had improved since Pelini's 2007 arrival.

== Draft picks, signees, or other future professional players ==
- Prince Amukamara, 2011 1st–round pick of the New York Giants
- DeJon Gomes, 2011 5th–round pick of the Washington Redskins
- Eric Hagg, 2011 7th–round pick of the Cleveland Browns
- Roy Helu, 2011 4th–round pick of the Washington Redskins
- Alex Henery, 2011 4th–round pick of the Philadelphia Eagles
- Ricky Henry, 2011 UFL 1st–round pick of the Hartford Colonials
- D.J. Jones, 2011 UFL 6th–round pick of the Omaha Nighthawks
- Niles Paul, 2011 5th–round pick of the Washington Redskins
- Mike Smith, 2011 UFL 5th–round pick of the Omaha Nighthawks
- Keith Williams, 2011 6th–round pick of the Pittsburgh Steelers

== In popular culture ==
The 2010 Cornhuskers were referenced in the season 6 Better Call Saul episode Nippy. Protagonist Saul Goodman discusses the team's fortunes with a mall security guard to distract him while an acquaintance robs a clothing store.
