= 2010 Big 12 Conference football season =

American college football season

- League: NCAA Division I FBS (Football Bowl Subdivision)
- Sport: football
- Teams: 12
- TV partner(s): ABC, Fox Sports Net, ESPN, Versus, Fox College Sports

2011 NFL Draft
- Top draft pick: Von Miller (Texas A&M)
- Picked by: Denver Broncos, 2nd overall

Regular season
- North champions: Nebraska Cornhuskers
- South champions: Oklahoma Sooners

Big 12 Championship Game
- Champions: Oklahoma Sooners

Football seasons
- 2009 2011

2010 Big 12 Conference football standings
	Conf.			Overall
Team	W		L	W		L
North Division
No. 20 Nebraska xy	6	–	2	10	–	4
No. 18 Missouri x	6	–	2	10	–	3
Kansas State	3	–	5	7	–	6
Iowa State	3	–	5	5	–	7
Colorado	2	–	6	5	–	7
Kansas	1	–	7	3	–	9
South Division
No. 6 Oklahoma xy$	6	–	2	12	–	2
No. 13 Oklahoma State x	6	–	2	11	–	2
No. 19 Texas A&M x	6	–	2	9	–	4
Baylor	4	–	4	7	–	6
Texas Tech	3	–	5	8	–	5
Texas	2	–	6	5	–	7
Championship: Oklahoma 23, Nebraska 20
$ – BCS representative as conference champion; x – Division champion/co-champions; y – Championship game participant; Rankings from AP Poll

The 2010 Big 12 Conference football season was the 15th season for the Big 12, as part of the 2010 NCAA Division I FBS football season. It was also the final season in the conference for Colorado and Nebraska as Colorado moved to the Pac-12 and Nebraska transferred to the Big Ten the following season.

== Preseason ==
=== Coaching changes ===
School	Outgoing coach	Reason	Replacement
Kansas	Mark Mangino	Fired	Turner Gill
Texas Tech	Mike Leach	Fired	Tommy Tuberville
Colorado	Dan Hawkins	Fired mid-season	Brian Cabral (interim)

=== Media Poll ===
North
1	Nebraska	156 (26)
2	Missouri	125
3	Kansas State	79
4	Kansas	70
5	Colorado	61
6	Iowa State	55

South
1	Oklahoma	146 (17)
1	Texas	140 (10)
3	Texas A&M	97
4	Texas Tech	68
5	Oklahoma State	53
6	Baylor	42

Ranked by total points, first place votes shown in parentheses.

== Rankings ==
Legend
	Improvement in ranking
	Drop in ranking
	Not ranked previous week
RV	Received votes but were not ranked in Top 25 of poll

		Pre	Wk 2	Wk 3	Wk 4	Wk 5	Wk 6	Wk 7	Wk 8	Wk 9	Wk 10	Wk 11	Wk 12	Wk 13	Wk 14	Wk 15	Final
Baylor	AP			RV			RV		RV	25	22	RV					
Baylor	C						RV		RV	24	22	RV	RV				
Baylor	HAR	Not released						RV	RV	25	22	RV	RV				
Baylor	BCS	Not released								25	21						
Colorado	AP																
Colorado	C																
Colorado	HAR	Not released															
Colorado	BCS	Not released															
Iowa State	AP																
Iowa State	C																
Iowa State	HAR	Not released															
Iowa State	BCS	Not released															
Kansas	AP																
Kansas	C																
Kansas	HAR	Not released															
Kansas	BCS	Not released															
Kansas State	AP		RV	RV	RV	RV	RV	RV	RV			RV					
Kansas State	C		RV	RV	RV	RV	RV		RV			RV	RV				
Kansas State	HAR	Not released						RV	RV	RV		RV	RV				
Kansas State	BCS	Not released							22			24					
Missouri	AP	RV	RV	RV	RV	RV	24	21	18	7	14	20	15	15	15	14	
Missouri	C	RV	RV	25	24	23	22	19	16	8	14	20	16	16	14	14	
Missouri	HAR	Not released						19	16	8	15	20	16	16	14	13	
Missouri	BCS	Not released							11	6	12	17	15	14	12	12	
Nebraska	AP	8	6	8	6	6	7	5	14	14	9	9	9	16	13	17	
Nebraska	C	9	7	8	7	6	6	4	13	12	10	8	9	15	13	16	
Nebraska	HAR	Not released						5	14	14	11	9	9	15	13	17	
Nebraska	BCS	Not released							16	14	7	8	8	15	13	18	
Oklahoma	AP	7	10	7	8	8	6	6	3	11	11	19	16	14	10	9	
Oklahoma	C	8	10	9	9	8	7	6	3	11	9	16	14	13	9	8	
Oklahoma	HAR	Not released						6	4	11	9	16	14	13	9	9	
Oklahoma	BCS	Not released							1	9	8	16	14	13	9	7	
Oklahoma State	AP	RV	RV	RV	RV	RV	22	20	17	20	19	12	12	10	16	16	
Oklahoma State	C	RV	RV	RV	25	24	21	18	15	20	18	11	10	9	15	13	
Oklahoma State	HAR	Not released						18	15	20	18	13	12	9	16	15	
Oklahoma State	BCS	Not released							14	17	17	10	10	9	14	14	
Texas	AP	5	5	6	7	21	RV	RV	22								
Texas	C	4	4	4	4	16	RV	RV	22	RV							
Texas	HAR	Not released						RV	22	RV							
Texas	BCS	Not released							19								
Texas A&M	AP	RV	RV	RV	RV							23	18	16	19	18	19
Texas A&M	C	RV	RV	RV	RV							25	19	18	18	17	21
Texas A&M	HAR	Not released									RV	24	20	18	19	18	
Texas A&M	BCS	Not released										25	19	17	18	17	
Texas Tech	AP	RV	RV	RV													
Texas Tech	C	RV	RV	RV	RV	RV											
Texas Tech	HAR	Not released															
Texas Tech	BCS	Not released															

== Records against other conferences ==
Conference	Wins	Losses	Pct
WAC	5	0	1.000
Sun Belt	4	0	1.000
MAC	3	0	1.000
ACC	2	0	1.000
Big East	1	0	1.000
All FCS	6	1	.857
C-USA	5	1	.833
MWC	5	2	.714
Pac-10	3	2	.600
Big 10	1	1	.500
SEC	1	1	.500
Independents	0	0	
Overall	36	8	.818

== Bowl games ==
Selection	Bowl Game	Date	Stadium	City	Television	Matchup/Results	Attendance	Payout (US$)
#1	Fiesta Bowl	January 1, 2011	University of Phoenix Stadium	Glendale, Arizona	ESPN	#9 Oklahoma vs. #25 Connecticut		$17 million
#2	Cotton Bowl Classic	January 7, 2011	Cowboys Stadium	Arlington, Texas	FOX	#18 Texas A&M vs. #11 LSU		$3 million
#3	Alamo Bowl	December 29, 2010	Alamodome	San Antonio, Texas	ESPN	#16 Oklahoma State vs. Arizona		$2.25 million
#4	Insight Bowl	December 28, 2010	Sun Devil Stadium	Tempe, Arizona	NFL Network	#14 Missouri vs. Iowa		$1.2 million
#5	Holiday Bowl	December 30, 2010	Qualcomm Stadium	San Diego, California	ESPN	#17 Nebraska vs. Washington		$2.13 million
#6	Texas Bowl	December 29, 2010	Reliant Stadium	Houston, Texas	ESPN	Baylor vs. Illinois		$612,500
#7	Pinstripe Bowl	December 30, 2010	Yankee Stadium	New York City, New York	ESPN	Kansas State vs. Syracuse		$2 million
#8	TicketCity Bowl	January 1, 2011	Cotton Bowl	Dallas, Texas	ESPNU	Texas Tech vs. Northwestern		$1.2 million

== Attendance ==
Team	Stadium	Capacity	Home Game 1	Home Game 2	Home Game 3	Home Game 4	Home Game 5	Home Game 6	Stadium Total	Stadium Average	% of Capacity
Baylor	Floyd Casey Stadium	50,000	42,821	40,853	35,405	40,057	45,089		204,225	40,845	81.7%
Colorado	Folsom Field	53,613	47,840	52,855	48,953	47,665	42,722		240,035	48,007	89.5%
Iowa State	Jack Trice Stadium	55,000	43,116	48,874	43,162	43,195	46,485	51,159	275,991	45,999	83.6%
Kansas	Memorial Stadium	50,071	48,417	46,907	46,719	47,561	44,239	40,851	274,694	45,782	91.4%
Kansas State	Bill Snyder Family Football Stadium	50,000	51,059	48,672	50,586	51,015	50,831	46,734	298,897	49,816	99.6%
Missouri	Faurot Field	71,004	55,582	56,050	60,329	62,965	71,004	63,310	369,240	61,540	86.7%
Nebraska	Memorial Stadium	81,067	85,555	85,732	85,573	85,648	85,907	85,587	514,002	85,667	105.7%
Oklahoma	Gaylord Family Oklahoma Memorial Stadium	82,112	85,151	85,630	84,332	84,024	84,173	85,116	508,426	84,738	103.2%
Oklahoma State	Boone Pickens Stadium	60,218	48,692	48,820	51,778	48,284	55,935	50,741	304,250	50,708	84.2%
Texas	Darrell K Royal–Texas Memorial Stadium	100,119	101,339	101,437	100,142	100,452	100,659		504,029	100,806	100.7%
Texas A&M	Kyle Field	82,600	81,287	77,579	79,069	83,453	84,479	81,392	487,259	81,210	98.3%
Texas Tech	Jones AT&T Stadium	60,454	57,528	60,454	60,454	55,667			234,103	58,526	96.8%
