= 2010 Kansas State Wildcats football team =

American college football season

2010 Kansas State Wildcats football

Pinstripe Bowl, L 34–36 vs. Syracuse
- Conference: Big 12 Conference
- North
- Record: 7–6 (3–5 Big 12)
- Head coach: Bill Snyder (19th season)
- Co-offensive coordinators: Dana Dimel (4th season); Del Miller (11th season)
- Offensive scheme: Multiple
- Defensive coordinator: Chris Cosh (2nd season)
- Base defense: 4–3
- Home stadium: Bill Snyder Family Football Stadium

2010 Big 12 Conference football standings
	Conf.			Overall
Team	W		L	W		L
North Division
No. 20 Nebraska xy	6	–	2	10	–	4
No. 18 Missouri x	6	–	2	10	–	3
Kansas State	3	–	5	7	–	6
Iowa State	3	–	5	5	–	7
Colorado	2	–	6	5	–	7
Kansas	1	–	7	3	–	9
South Division
No. 6 Oklahoma xy$	6	–	2	12	–	2
No. 13 Oklahoma State x	6	–	2	11	–	2
No. 19 Texas A&M x	6	–	2	9	–	4
Baylor	4	–	4	7	–	6
Texas Tech	3	–	5	8	–	5
Texas	2	–	6	5	–	7
Championship: Oklahoma 23, Nebraska 20
$ – BCS representative as conference champion; x – Division champion/co-champions; y – Championship game participant; Rankings from AP Poll

The 2010 Kansas State Wildcats football team (variously "Kansas State", "KSU", or "K-State") represented Kansas State University in the 2010 NCAA Division I FBS football season. The Wildcats played their home games at Bill Snyder Family Football Stadium, in Manhattan, Kansas as they have done since 1968. It was the 115th season in school history. They were members of the Big 12 Conference in the north division. They finished the season 7–6, 3–5 in Big 12 play and were invited to the Pinstripe Bowl where they were defeated by Syracuse 34–36.

== Schedule ==
Date	Time	Opponent	Site	TV	Result	Attendance	Source
September 4	2:30 p.m.	UCLA*	Bill Snyder Family Football Stadium; Manhattan, KS	ABC/ESPN2	W 31–22	51,059	
September 11	6:10 p.m.	Missouri State*	Bill Snyder Family Football Stadium; Manhattan, KS		W 48–24	48,672	
September 18	11:00 a.m.	vs. Iowa State	Arrowhead Stadium; Kansas City, MO (rivalry)	FSN	W 27–20	38,468	
September 25	11:30 a.m.	UCF*	Bill Snyder Family Football Stadium; Manhattan, KS	FSN	W 17–13	50,586	
October 7	6:30 p.m.	No. 7 Nebraska	Bill Snyder Family Football Stadium; Manhattan, KS (rivalry)	ESPN	L 13–48	51,015	
October 14	6:30 p.m.	at Kansas	Memorial Stadium; Lawrence, KS (rivalry)	FSN	W 59–7	47,561	
October 23	2:30 p.m.	at Baylor	Floyd Casey Stadium; Waco, TX		L 42–47	40,057	
October 30	11:00 a.m.	No. 20 Oklahoma State^{†}	Bill Snyder Family Football Stadium; Manhattan, KS	FSN	L 14–24	50,831	
November 6	7:00 p.m.	Texas	Bill Snyder Family Football Stadium; Manhattan, KS	ESPN2	W 39–14	46,734	
November 13	11:30 a.m.	at No. 20 Missouri	Faurot Field; Columbia, MO	FSN	L 28–38	63,310	
November 20	1:00 p.m.	at Colorado	Folsom Field; Boulder, CO (rivalry)	PPV	L 36–44	41,147	
November 27	3:00 p.m.	at North Texas*	Fouts Field; Denton, TX	ESPN3	W 49–41	21,952	
December 30	2:00 p.m.	vs. Syracuse*	Yankee Stadium; Bronx, NY (Pinstripe Bowl)	ESPN	L 34–36	38,274	
*Non-conference game; ^{†}Homecoming; Rankings from AP Poll released prior to the game; All times are in Central time

== Rankings ==
Ranking movements Legend: ██ Increase in ranking ██ Decrease in ranking — = Not ranked RV = Received votes
	Week															
Poll	Pre	1	2	3	4	5	6	7	8	9	10	11	12	13	14	Final
AP	RV	RV	RV	RV	RV	RV	RV	RV	RV	—	RV	—	—	—	—	—
Coaches	RV	RV	RV	RV	RV	RV	RV	RV	—	—	RV	RV	—	—	—	—
Harris	Not released						RV	25	RV	—	RV	—	—	—	—	Not released
BCS	Not released							22	—	—	24	—	—	—	—	Not released

== Game summaries ==
=== UCLA ===
	1	2	3	4	Total
UCLA	0	10	3	9	22
Kansas State	7	0	10	14	31

Daniel Thomas ran for 234 yards and two touchdowns and the Wildcats won their 21st season opener in a row. Carson Coffman threw 16 times, completing 11 passing and had just 66 yards passing. William Powell added 72 yards on just 6 carries. K-State set a home opener record with an attendance of 51,059.

=== Missouri State ===
	1	2	3	4	Total
Missouri State	0	7	3	14	24
Kansas State	7	20	14	7	48

Carson Coffman threw three touchdown passes and Daniel Thomas ran for 137 yards. The Wildcats had 493 yards of total offense.

=== Iowa State ===
	1	2	3	4	Total
Iowa State	0	7	10	3	20
Kansas State	3	7	7	10	27

The Wildcats were favored by 4.

=== Central Florida ===
	1	2	3	4	Total
UCF	7	0	3	3	13
Kansas State	0	0	3	14	17

The Wildcats were favored by 7.

=== Nebraska ===
	1	2	3	4	Total
#7 Nebraska	7	10	21	10	48
Kansas State	0	3	3	7	13

The Cornhuskers were favored by 12.

=== Kansas ===
	1	2	3	4	Total
Kansas State	3	28	21	7	59
Kansas	0	0	0	7	7

For the second consecutive week the Wildcats played a Thursday night game. This game was against the rival Kansas Jayhawks for the Governors Cup. Kansas State scored first on a Josh Cherry field goal in the first quarter. During the second quarter Kansas State scored 4 touchdowns the first 2 coming from QB Carson Coffman runs, the third coming from a Daniel Thomas rush, and the fourth a reception by Travis Tannahill. In the third quarter the Wildcats scored three more touchdowns. The first coming on a pass to Andre McDonald from Carson Coffman, the second coming on a Stephen Harrison 85 yard fumble return, and the third coming on a Carson Coffman run. In the fourth quarter the Jayhawks scored on an Angus Quigly run. The Wildcats scored once more on a Colin Klein 51 yard run. The final score was K-State 59 KU 7. Carson Coffman went an impressive 15 for 16 for 184 yards and 2 touchdown passes in addition he also had 91 yards on the ground and 3 more touchdowns. Daniel Thomas had 91 yards and 1 touchdown. This was the largest margin of victory for either team since 2002 when K-State won 64–0. This loss is tied for the worst loss since KU lost to Texas 66–14 in 2005. In addition this was coach Bill Snyder's 14th win in the last 15 games against Kansas.

=== Baylor ===
	1	2	3	4	Total
Kansas State	7	14	7	14	42
Baylor	14	17	9	7	47

The Bears were favored by 6. With the win over BCS #22 Kansas State, Baylor became bowl-eligible for the first time in Big 12 history.

=== Oklahoma State ===
	1	2	3	4	Total
#20 Oklahoma State	0	7	10	7	24
Kansas State	0	7	0	7	14

The Cowboys were favored by 5.

=== Texas ===
	1	2	3	4	Total
Texas	0	0	0	14	14
Kansas State	10	14	15	0	39

The Longhorns were favored by 6.

Kansas State, with Collin Klein starting for the injured Carson Coffman, went on to win 39–14. Entering the fourth quarter Kansas State was leading 39–0. Texas quarterback Garrett Gilbert had 272 passing yards, 1 passing touchdown and 93 yards rushing, in addition to 5 interceptions. Kansas State quarterback Collin Klein had 9 passing yards on 4 attempts, 127 rushing yards and 2 rushing touchdowns. Kansas State running back Daniel Thomas had 106 rushing yards and 2 rushing touchdowns. Kansas State defensive backs Ty Zimmerman and Tyson Hartman both had 2 Garrett Gilbert interceptions, while Kansas State defensive back Stephen Harrison also had 1 interception. This was the Wildcats' third straight win over the Longhorns.

=== Missouri ===
	1	2	3	4	Total
#24 Kansas State	0	14	0	14	28
#17 Missouri	7	14	10	7	38

=== Colorado ===
	1	2	3	4	Total
Kansas State	14	0	8	14	36
Colorado	9	14	14	7	44

=== North Texas ===
	1	2	3	4	Total
Kansas State	7	14	21	7	49
North Texas	20	0	14	7	41

=== Pinstripe Bowl ===
	1	2	3	4	Total
Kansas State	7	7	7	13	34
Syracuse	7	7	13	9	36

The 2010 Pinstripe Bowl was played at Yankee Stadium in Bronx, New York on December 30, 2010. Syracuse won by a final score 36–34.

With 1:13 left in the game, Kansas State's Adrian Hilburn scored a 30-yard touchdown to pull KSU within two points of a tie. Following the score, Hilburn made a military hand salute toward the crowd and was penalized for unsportsmanlike conduct. Because of the 15-yard penalty, Kansas State had to attempt a two-point conversion from the 17-yard line. The conversion failed, accounting for the margin in the final score. The call was considered highly controversial, and according to ESPN determined the outcome of the game. Due to the impact from this call, the NCAA chose in the next year's rule changes to not penalize celebrating in general but to penalize only taunting. The call was called "one of the most infamous plays of the college football season in 2010" and was given the name "The Bronx Salute." It later was used as an example of incorrect interpretation of the new celebration rules.

== Roster ==
2010 roster
Quarterbacks: 4 Billy Cosh – Fr.; 9 Ryan Manes – Fr.; 7 Collin Klein – So.; 13 Sammuel Lamur – Jr.; 14 Carson Coffman – Sr.; 15 Sam Johnson – Fr.; Running backs: 4 Bryce Brown – (redshirt) So.; 8 Daniel Thomas – Sr.; 20 William Powell – Sr.; 21 Frank Delrue – Jr.; 24 Rodney Kenner – Jr.; 28 Robert Rose – Fr.; 30 DeMarcus Robinson – Fr.; 33 John Hubert – Fr.; Full backs: 27 Brad Duncan – Fr.; 36 Ben Kall – So.; 37 Braden Wilson – So.; 39 Jay Hanley – So.; 49 Lucas Hamm – Sr.; Wide receivers: 2 Stephen Johnson – Fr.; 3 Chris Harper – So.; 5 Brodrick Smith – So.; 17 Cole Bachamp – Jr.; 19 Devin Gfeller – Fr.; 22 Zach McFall – So.; 26 Cale Miller – Fr.; 29 Cody Harrison – Fr.; 31 Adam Repass-Orduna – So.; 82 Adrian Hilburn – Jr.; 83 Ed Brown – Fr.; 86 Tramaine Thompson – Fr.; 87 Sheldon Smith – Sr.; 88 Torell Miller – So.; 89 Aubrey Quarles – Sr.; Tight ends: 18 Andre McDonald – Fr.; 41 Zach Nemechek – Fr.; 47 Gabe Gantz – Sr.; 80 Travis Tannahill – So.; 81 Jeremy Sutton – Jr.; 84 Curtis Hubbell – So.; 85 Zach Trujillo – Fr.	Offensive line: 42 Corey Adams – Jr. (long snapper); 44 Chandler Smith – Fr. (long snapper); 50 Nick Puetz – Jr.; 51 Cameron McLain – Fr.; 52 John McClure – Fr.; 54 Trevor Viers – Sr.; 59 Zach Kendall – Sr.; 61 Drew Liddle – Fr.; 62 Logan Wiltfong – Fr.; 63 Marcus Heit – Fr. (long snapper); 64 Tomasi Mariner -Fr.; 65 Mike Powell – Jr.; 66 B. J. Finney- Fr.; 67 Kenneth Mayfield – Sr.; 68 William Cooper – Fr.; 69 Nick Ward – Jr.; 70 Zach Hanson – Jr.; 71 Ethan Douglas – So.; 72 Kaleb Drinkgern – Jr.; 73 Manese Foteki- Jr.; 74 Wade Weibert – Sr.; 75 Clyde Aufner – Jr.; 76 Jordan Allred – So.; 77 Colten Freeze – Jr.; 78 Cornelius Lucas – Fr.; 79 Keneen Taylor – Fr.; Defensive line: 40 Antonio Felder – Sr.; 46 Prizell Brown – Sr.; 52 Matt Bowman – Fr.; 54 Taylor Godinet – Fr.; 57 Jordan Voelker – Jr.; 60 Dustin Sobieraj – Jr.; 62 Logan Wiltfong – Fr.; 72 Ryan Mueller – Fr.; 73 Oladipo Fajimolu – Jr.; 90 Laton Dowling – Fr.; 91 Brandon Harold – (redshirt) So.; 92 Josh Sutton – Jr.; 93 Eric Diesel – Jr.; 94 Raphael Guidry – Jr.; 95 Ray Kibble – Jr.; 96 Payton Kirk – Jr.; 97 Adam Davis – Jr.; 98 Ethan Reinke – Fr.; 99 Javonta Boyd – Jr.	Linebackers: 6 Tate Snyder – Fr.; 20 Riley Williams – Fr.; 26 Jarell Childs – So.; 32 Roman Fiels – Fr.; 33 Weston Hiebert – Fr.; 34 Cody Marley – Fr.; 36 Nick Briney – So.; 37 David Smith – Fr.; 39 Jonathan Truman – Fr.; 40 Antonio Felder – Jr.; 44 Josh Berard – Sr.; 45 Kevin Rohlder – Sr.; 46 Arthur Brown – (redshirt) Jr.; 47 Jared Loomis – Jr.; 48 Jarett Wright – Sr.; 49 Mitchell Roberts – Fr.; 50 Tre Walker – Fr.; 51 Blake Martin – Fr.; 52 Taylor Kuhlman – Fr.; 53 Blake Slaughter – So.; 55 Kadero Terrell – Jr.; 56 Alex Hrebec – Jr.; 58 Clarence Bumpas – Fr.; 59 Brian Hertzog – Jr.; Defensive backs: 2 Tysyn Hartman – Jr.; 8 Stephen Harrison – Sr.; 10 Kelo Webster – Fr.; 12 Ty Zimmerman – Fr.; 15 Randall Evans – Fr.; 16 Terrance Sweeney – Sr.; 21 Troy Butler – Sr.; 22 Thomas Ferguson – So.; 23 Emmanuel Lamur – Jr.; 24 Dahrnaz Tigner – Jr.; 25 Joseph Bonugli – Fr.; 27 David Garrett – Jr.; 28 Logan Dold – Jr.; 29 Tanner Burns – Jr.; 30 Drew Mueller – Fr.; 31 Thomas Hankerson – So.; 32 Roman Fields – Fr.; 35 Ian Peters – So.; 38 Matthew Pearson – Jr.; 41 Charles Melton – Fr.; 43 Marc St. Felix – Jr.; Punters: 9 Ryan Doerr – So.; 17 George Pierson – Sr.; Kickers: 6 Brandon Klimek – (redshirt) So.; 10 Anthony Cantele – So.; 14 Evan Engwall- So.; 19 Josh Cherry – So.

== Coaching staff ==
The following is a list of coaches at Kansas State for the 2010 season.

Name	Position
Bill Snyder	Head coach
Chris Cosh	Asst. Head Coach/defensive Coordinator
Keith Burns	Defensive backs
Joe Bob Clements	Defensive ends
Mo Latimore	Defensive line
Dana Dimel	Running Game Coordinator/running backs
Del Miller	Passing Game Coordinator/quarterbacks
Charlie Dickey	Offensive line
Ricky Rahne	Tight ends
Michael Smith	Wide receivers
Joe Gordon	Recruiting Operations
Jonathan Beasley	Offensive Graduate Assistant
Kyle Williams	Defensive Graduate Assistant
Sean Snyder	Assoc. A.D./Assoc. HC of Football Operations and Devel.

== Recruiting ==
The following is a list of the recruits that are on the 2010 roster.

College recruiting information
Name	Hometown	School	Height	Weight	40^{‡}	Commit date
Jordan Allred; OL	Thousand Oaks, CA	Thousand Oaks High School	6 ft 4 in (1.93 m)	300 lb (140 kg)		Nov 9, 2009
Jordan Allred; OL	Recruit ratings: Scout: Rivals:					
Joseph Bonugli; DB	San Antonio, TX	Warren High School	6 ft 0 in (1.83 m)	192 lb (87 kg)	4.5	Feb 4, 2009
Joseph Bonugli; DB	Recruit ratings: Scout: Rivals: (75)					
Javonta Boyd; DL	St. Petersburg, FL	Northeast High School	6 ft 4 in (1.93 m)	302 lb (137 kg)	5.2	Aug 3, 2009
Javonta Boyd; DL	Recruit ratings: Scout: Rivals:					
Prizell Brown; DL	Austin, TX	Connally High School	6 ft 4 in (1.93 m)	265 lb (120 kg)		
Prizell Brown; DL	Recruit ratings: Scout: Rivals:					
Billy Cosh; QB	Gambrills, MD	Arundel High School	6 ft 2 in (1.88 m)	196 lb (89 kg)	4.8	Aug 10, 2009
Billy Cosh; QB	Recruit ratings: Scout: Rivals: (75)					
Adam Davis; DL	Folkston, GA	Charlton County High School	6 ft 1 in (1.85 m)	243 lb (110 kg)	4.72	Jul 14, 2009
Adam Davis; DL	Recruit ratings: Scout: Rivals:					
Deveon Dinwiddie; RB	Hutchinson, KS	Hutchinson High School	5 ft 9 in (1.75 m)	175 lb (79 kg)	4.42	Jan 27, 2010
Deveon Dinwiddie; RB	Recruit ratings: Scout: Rivals: (40)					
Laton Dowling; DL	Dodge City, KS	Dodge City High School	6 ft 3 in (1.91 m)	235 lb (107 kg)	4.7	Jul 13, 2009
Laton Dowling; DL	Recruit ratings: Scout: Rivals: (75)					
Manase Foketi; OL	Hesperia, CA	Sultana High School	6 ft 5 in (1.96 m)	325 lb (147 kg)		Feb 2, 2010
Manase Foketi; OL	Recruit ratings: Scout: Rivals:					
Kason Hostrup; OL	Sachse, TX	Sachse High School	6 ft 5 in (1.96 m)	300 lb (140 kg)		Jun 17, 2009
Kason Hostrup; OL	Recruit ratings: Scout: Rivals: (77)					
Ray Kibble; DL	Houston, TX	Alief Hastings High School	6 ft 5 in (1.96 m)	310 lb (140 kg)	5.1	Oct 1, 2009
Ray Kibble; DL	Recruit ratings: Scout: Rivals:					
Kyle Klein; DL	Loveland, CO	Loveland High School	6 ft 5 in (1.96 m)	205 lb (93 kg)	4.6	Jan 24, 2010
Kyle Klein; DL	Recruit ratings: Rivals: (71)					
Sammuel Lamur; QB	West Palm Beach, FL		6 ft 4 in (1.93 m)	215 lb (98 kg)	4.6	
Sammuel Lamur; QB	Recruit ratings: Rivals:					
Cody Marley; LB	Denton, TX		6 ft 1 in (1.85 m)	230 lb (100 kg)	4.6	Feb 18, 2009
Cody Marley; LB	Recruit ratings: Rivals: (74)					
Tomasi Mariner; OL	Topeka, KS	Washburn Rural High School	6 ft 4 in (1.93 m)	305 lb (138 kg)	5.0	Feb 2, 2009
Tomasi Mariner; OL	Recruit ratings: Scout: Rivals: (77)					
Destin Mosley; WR	Jefferson, TX	Jefferson High School	5 ft 9 in (1.75 m)	175 lb (79 kg)	4.4	Jul 1, 2009
Destin Mosley; WR	Recruit ratings: Scout: Rivals: (74)					
Matthew Pearson; DB	Wichita, KS	High School	6 ft 0 in (1.83 m)	190 lb (86 kg)	4.4	Jul 14, 2009
Matthew Pearson; DB	Recruit ratings: Scout: Rivals:					
DeMarcus Robinson; RB	Wichita, KS	Wichita Northwest High School	5 ft 9 in (1.75 m)	192 lb (87 kg)	4.4	Apr 8, 2009
DeMarcus Robinson; RB	Recruit ratings: Scout: Rivals: (77)					
Curry Sexton; WR	Abilene, KS	Abilene High School	6 ft 0 in (1.83 m)	190 lb (86 kg)	4.7	Jan 17, 2010
Curry Sexton; WR	Recruit ratings: Scout: Rivals: (40)					
Brodrick Smith; WR	Garden City, KS	Garden City High School	6 ft 3 in (1.91 m)	205 lb (93 kg)		
Brodrick Smith; WR	Recruit ratings: Scout: Rivals: (73)					
Tate Snyder; LB	Manhattan, KS	Manhattan High School	5 ft 11 in (1.80 m)	205 lb (93 kg)		Sep 17, 2009
Tate Snyder; LB	Recruit ratings: Scout: Rivals: (40)					
Terrance Sweeney; DB	Houston, TX	Westfield High School	5 ft 10 in (1.78 m)	175 lb (79 kg)		
Terrance Sweeney; DB	Recruit ratings: No ratings found					
Darious Thomas; DB	Dallas, TX	Cedar Hill High School	6 ft 0 in (1.83 m)	180 lb (82 kg)	4.5	
Darious Thomas; DB	Recruit ratings: Scout: Rivals:					
Courtney Thompson; DB	Miramar, FL	Everglades High School	6 ft 0 in (1.83 m)	180 lb (82 kg)	4.5	Jan 19, 2009
Courtney Thompson; DB	Recruit ratings: Scout: Rivals: (40)					
Zach Trujillo; TE	Edmond, OK	Deer Creek High School	6 ft 4 in (1.93 m)	240 lb (110 kg)	4.8	Sep 2, 2008
Zach Trujillo; TE	Recruit ratings: Scout: Rivals: (74)					
Tre Walker; LB	Olathe, KS	Olathe North High School	6 ft 4 in (1.93 m)	205 lb (93 kg)	4.6	Apr 2, 2009
Tre Walker; LB	Recruit ratings: Scout: Rivals: (40)					
Justin Williams; DL	Grand Prairie, TX	High School	6 ft 0 in (1.83 m)	290 lb (130 kg)	4.9	Sep 27, 2009
Justin Williams; DL	Recruit ratings: Scout: Rivals:					
Ty Zimmerman; QB	Junction City, KS	Junction City High School	6 ft 2 in (1.88 m)	200 lb (91 kg)	4.6	Feb 3, 2009
Ty Zimmerman; QB	Recruit ratings: Scout: Rivals: (40)					
Overall recruit ranking: Scout: 98 Rivals: 62
Note: In many cases, Scout, Rivals, 247Sports, On3, and ESPN may conflict in their listings of height and weight.; In these cases, the average was taken. ESPN grades are on a 100-point scale.; Sources: "2010 Kansas State Football Commits". Rivals.; "2010 Kansas State Football Commits". Scout.; "ESPN". ESPN.; "Scout.com Team Recruiting Rankings". Scout.; "2010 Team Ranking". Rivals.com.
