= 2010 Baylor Bears football team =

American college football season

2010 Baylor Bears football

Texas Bowl, L 14–38 vs. Illinois
- Conference: Big 12 Conference
- South Division
- Record: 7–6 (4–4 Big 12)
- Head coach: Art Briles (3rd season)
- Co-offensive coordinators: Randy Clements (3rd season); Philip Montgomery (3rd season)
- Offensive scheme: Veer and shoot
- Defensive coordinator: Brian Norwood (3rd season)
- Base defense: 4–3
- Captain: Game captains
- Home stadium: Floyd Casey Stadium (Capacity: 50,000)

2010 Big 12 Conference football standings
| | Conf. | | | Overall |
| Team | W | | L | W | | L |
|---|---|---|---|---|---|---|
North Division
| No. 20 Nebraska xy | 6 | – | 2 | 10 | – | 4 |
| No. 18 Missouri x | 6 | – | 2 | 10 | – | 3 |
| Kansas State | 3 | – | 5 | 7 | – | 6 |
| Iowa State | 3 | – | 5 | 5 | – | 7 |
| Colorado | 2 | – | 6 | 5 | – | 7 |
| Kansas | 1 | – | 7 | 3 | – | 9 |
South Division
| No. 6 Oklahoma xy$ | 6 | – | 2 | 12 | – | 2 |
| No. 13 Oklahoma State x | 6 | – | 2 | 11 | – | 2 |
| No. 19 Texas A&M x | 6 | – | 2 | 9 | – | 4 |
| Baylor | 4 | – | 4 | 7 | – | 6 |
| Texas Tech | 3 | – | 5 | 8 | – | 5 |
| Texas | 2 | – | 6 | 5 | – | 7 |
Championship: Oklahoma 23, Nebraska 20
$ – BCS representative as conference champion; x – Division champion/co-champions; y – Championship game participant; Rankings from AP Poll

The 2010 Baylor Bears football team represented Baylor University in the 2010 NCAA Division I FBS football season. The team was coached by Art Briles and played their home games at Floyd Casey Stadium in Waco, Texas. They are members of the Big 12 Conference in the South Division. They finished the season 7–6, 4–4 in Big 12 play and were invited to the Texas Bowl, their first bowl appearance since 1994, where they were defeated by Illinois 14–38. This season featured BU's first win over the University of Texas since 1997, and the first in Austin since 1991 (12 straight losses, the most recent 11 losses all by at least 21 points).

== Schedule ==
| Date | Time | Opponent | Rank | Site | TV | Result | Attendance |
|---|---|---|---|---|---|---|---|
| September 4 | 6:00 p.m. | Sam Houston State* | | Floyd Casey Stadium; Waco, TX | | W 34–3 | 42,821 |
| September 11 | 6:00 p.m. | Buffalo* | | Floyd Casey Stadium; Waco, TX | FCS | W 34–6 | 40,853 |
| September 18 | 3:30 p.m. | at No. 4 TCU* | | Amon G. Carter Stadium; Fort Worth, TX (rivalry) | Versus | L 10–45 | 47,493 |
| September 25 | 7:00 p.m. | at Rice* | | Rice Stadium; Houston, TX | CBSCS | W 30–13 | 23,395 |
| October 2 | 11:00 a.m. | Kansas | | Floyd Casey Stadium; Waco, TX | FSN | W 55–7 | 35,405 |
| October 9 | 11:00 a.m. | vs. Texas Tech | | Cotton Bowl; Dallas, TX (Texas Farm Bureau Insurance Shootout) | FSN | L 38–45 | 48,213 |
| October 16 | 6:00 p.m. | at Colorado | | Folsom Field; Boulder, CO | FCS | W 31–25 | 48,953 |
| October 23 | 2:30 p.m. | Kansas State^{†} | | Floyd Casey Stadium; Waco, TX | | W 47–42 | 40,057 |
| October 30 | 6:00 p.m. | at Texas | No. 25 | Darrell K Royal–Texas Memorial Stadium; Austin, TX (rivalry) | FSN | W 30–22 | 100,452 |
| November 6 | 11:30 a.m. | at No. 19 Oklahoma State | No. 22 | Boone Pickens Stadium; Stillwater, OK | FSN | L 28–55 | 50,741 |
| November 13 | 6:00 p.m. | No. 23 Texas A&M | | Floyd Casey Stadium; Waco, TX (Battle of the Brazos) | FSN | L 30–42 | 45,089 |
| November 20 | 7:00 p.m. | No. 16 Oklahoma | | Floyd Casey Stadium; Waco, TX | ESPN2 | L 24–53 | 36,034 |
| December 29 | 5:00 p.m. | vs. Illinois* | | Reliant Stadium; Houston, TX (Texas Bowl) | ESPN | L 14–38 | 68,211 |
*Non-conference game; ^{†}Homecoming; Rankings from AP Poll released prior to the game; All times are in Central time

== Rankings ==
Ranking movements Legend: ██ Increase in ranking ██ Decrease in ranking — = Not ranked RV = Received votes
| | Week | | | | | | | | | | | | | | | |
| Poll | Pre | 1 | 2 | 3 | 4 | 5 | 6 | 7 | 8 | 9 | 10 | 11 | 12 | 13 | 14 | Final |
|---|---|---|---|---|---|---|---|---|---|---|---|---|---|---|---|---|
| AP | — | — | RV | — | — | RV | — | RV | 25 | 22 | RV | — | — | — | — | — |
| Coaches Poll | — | — | — | — | — | RV | — | RV | 24 | 22 | RV | RV | — | — | — | — |
| Harris | Not released | | | | | | RV | RV | 25 | 22 | RV | RV | — | — | — | Not released |
| BCS | Not released | | | | | | | — | 25 | 21 | — | — | — | — | — | Not released |
