= 2010 Big 12 Championship Game =

2010 Dr Pepper Big 12 Championship Game
- 15th Big 12 Conference Championship
Oklahoma Sooners	Nebraska Cornhuskers
(10–2)	(10–2)
23	20
Head coach: Bob Stoops	Head coach: Bo Pelini
AP / Coaches / BCS; 10 / 9 / 9	AP / Coaches / BCS; 13 / 13 / 13
	1	2	3	4	Total
Oklahoma	0	17	3	3	23
Nebraska	10	10	0	0	20
- Date: December 4, 2010
- Season: 2010
- Stadium: Cowboys Stadium
- Location: Arlington, Texas
- Referee: Scott Novak
- Attendance: 78,802

United States TV coverage
- Network: ABC
- Announcers: Brent Musburger and Kirk Herbstreit

2010 Big 12 Conference football standings
	Conf.			Overall
Team	W		L	W		L
North Division
No. 20 Nebraska xy	6	–	2	10	–	4
No. 18 Missouri x	6	–	2	10	–	3
Kansas State	3	–	5	7	–	6
Iowa State	3	–	5	5	–	7
Colorado	2	–	6	5	–	7
Kansas	1	–	7	3	–	9
South Division
No. 6 Oklahoma xy$	6	–	2	12	–	2
No. 13 Oklahoma State x	6	–	2	11	–	2
No. 19 Texas A&M x	6	–	2	9	–	4
Baylor	4	–	4	7	–	6
Texas Tech	3	–	5	8	–	5
Texas	2	–	6	5	–	7
Championship: Oklahoma 23, Nebraska 20
$ – BCS representative as conference champion; x – Division champion/co-champions; y – Championship game participant; Rankings from AP Poll

The 2010 Big 12 Championship Game was a college football game played on Saturday, December 4, 2010, at Cowboys Stadium in Arlington. This was the 15th Big 12 Championship Game and determined the 2010 champion of the Big 12 Conference. The game featured the Nebraska Cornhuskers, champions of the North division, and the Oklahoma Sooners, champions of the South division. Sponsored by soft drink brand Dr Pepper, the game is officially known as the Dr Pepper Big 12 Championship Game.

This was not only the last Big 12 title game for Nebraska, it would prove to be the final Big 12 game Nebraska has played; since 2011 it has been a member of the Big Ten Conference.

== Previous season ==
The 2009 Big 12 Championship Game featured Nebraska, champions of the North division against Texas, champions of the South division. The game was the third championship tilt between the Cornhuskers and Longhorns. Unranked Texas upset No. 3 Nebraska 37–27 in the inaugural Big 12 title game in St. Louis, while No. 2 Nebraska beat No. 12 Texas 22–6 in 1999 in San Antonio. Texas was victorious by a score of 13–12, winning their third Big 12 Conference championship.

== 2010 conference realignment impact ==
From 2009 through 2013, the Big 12 Championship Game was scheduled to be played at the venue now known as AT&T Stadium. During June 2010, however, Nebraska and Colorado announced that they would leave the Big 12 for other conferences in 2011. Because then-current NCAA rules required that a conference have 12 members in order to stage a football championship game that was exempt from the organization's limits on regular-season games, it was announced on September 30, 2010, that the Big 12 would no longer have a conference championship game, starting with the 2011 football season.

== Game summary ==
2010 Big 12 Championship Game

Quarter	1	2	3	4	Total
No. 9 Oklahoma	0	17	3	3	23
No. 13 Nebraska	10	10	0	0	20

at AT&T Stadium • Arlington, Texas

- Date: December 4, 2010
- Game time: 7:00 p.m. CST
- Game weather: None (retractable roof closed)
- Game attendance: 78,802
- Referee: Scott Novak
- TV announcers (ABC): Brent Musburger (play-by-play), Kirk Herbstreit (analyst), and Holly Rowe (sideline)
- ESPN game summary

Game information

First quarter

Second quarter

Third quarter

Fourth quarter

=== Statistics ===
Statistics	OKLA	NEB
First downs	19	13
Plays–yards		
Rushes–yards		
Passing yards		
Passing: comp–att–int		
Turnovers		
Time of possession	17:20	19:39

Team	Category	Player	Statistics
Oklahoma	Passing	Landry Jones	
Oklahoma	Rushing	DeMarco Murray	
Oklahoma	Receiving	Kenny Stills	
Nebraska	Passing	Taylor Martinez	
Nebraska	Rushing	Roy Helu	
Nebraska	Receiving	Mike McNeill	

== Return of championship game in 2017 ==
Following a January 2016 NCAA rule change that allows FBS conferences to conduct football championship games regardless of their membership numbers, the Big 12 announced that the championship game would be reinstated in 2017.
