= 2010 Oklahoma State Cowboys football team =

American college football season

2010 Oklahoma State Cowboys football

Big 12 South Division co-champion Alamo Bowl champion

Alamo Bowl, W 36–10 vs. Arizona
- Conference: Big 12 Conference
- South

Ranking
- Coaches: No. 10
- AP: No. 13
- Record: 11–2 (6–2 Big 12)
- Head coach: Mike Gundy (6th season)
- Offensive coordinator: Dana Holgorsen (1st season)
- Offensive scheme: Air raid
- Defensive coordinator: Bill Young (2nd season)
- Base defense: 4–3
- Home stadium: Boone Pickens Stadium

Uniform

2010 Big 12 Conference football standings
	Conf.			Overall
Team	W		L	W		L
North Division
No. 20 Nebraska xy	6	–	2	10	–	4
No. 18 Missouri x	6	–	2	10	–	3
Kansas State	3	–	5	7	–	6
Iowa State	3	–	5	5	–	7
Colorado	2	–	6	5	–	7
Kansas	1	–	7	3	–	9
South Division
No. 6 Oklahoma xy$	6	–	2	12	–	2
No. 13 Oklahoma State x	6	–	2	11	–	2
No. 19 Texas A&M x	6	–	2	9	–	4
Baylor	4	–	4	7	–	6
Texas Tech	3	–	5	8	–	5
Texas	2	–	6	5	–	7
Championship: Oklahoma 23, Nebraska 20
$ – BCS representative as conference champion; x – Division champion/co-champions; y – Championship game participant; Rankings from AP Poll

The 2010 Oklahoma State Cowboys football team represented Oklahoma State University in the 2010 NCAA Division I FBS football season. The team was coached by sixth-year head coach Mike Gundy and played their homes game at Boone Pickens Stadium. They played in the Big 12 Conference in the South Division. They finished the year with an 11–2 record (6–2 Big 12) and a 36–10 victory over Arizona in the Alamo Bowl. Along the way, the Cowboys set a new school record for wins in a season, with 11. It was also the fourth 10-win season in the Cowboys' 110-year football history; the others came in 1984, 1987 and 1988.

== Schedule ==
Date	Time	Opponent	Rank	Site	TV	Result	Attendance
September 4	6:00 p.m.	Washington State*		Boone Pickens Stadium; Stillwater, OK	FSN	W 65–17	48,692
September 11	6:00 p.m.	Troy*		Boone Pickens Stadium; Stillwater, OK		W 41–38	48,820
September 18	6:00 p.m.	Tulsa*		Boone Pickens Stadium; Stillwater, OK (rivalry)		W 65–28	51,778
September 30	6:30 p.m.	Texas A&M		Boone Pickens Stadium; Stillwater, OK	ESPN	W 38–35	48,284
October 8	8:00 p.m.	at Louisiana–Lafayette*	No. 22	Cajun Field; Lafayette, LA	ESPN2	W 54–28	25,881
October 16	2:30 p.m.	at Texas Tech	No. 20	Jones AT&T Stadium; Lubbock, TX	FSN+	W 34–17	60,454
October 23	2:30 p.m.	No. 14 Nebraska^{†}	No. 17	Boone Pickens Stadium; Stillwater, OK	ABC	L 41–51	55,935
October 30	6:00 p.m.	at Kansas State	No. 20	Bill Snyder Family Football Stadium; Manhattan, KS	FSN	W 24–14	50,831
November 6	11:30 a.m.	No. 22 Baylor	No. 19	Boone Pickens Stadium; Stillwater, OK	FSN	W 55–28	50,741
November 13	7:00 p.m.	at Texas	No. 12	Darrell K Royal–Texas Memorial Stadium; Austin, TX	ABC	W 33–16	100,659
November 20	11:00 a.m.	at Kansas	No. 12	Memorial Stadium; Lawrence, KS	FSN	W 48–14	39,261
November 27	8:00 p.m.	No. 14 Oklahoma	No. 10	Boone Pickens Stadium; Stillwater, OK (Bedlam Game) (College GameDay)	ABC	L 41–47	51,164
December 29	8:15 p.m.	vs. Arizona*	No. 16	Alamodome; San Antonio, TX (Alamo Bowl)	ESPN	W 36–10	57,593
*Non-conference game; ^{†}Homecoming; Rankings from AP Poll released prior to the game; All times are in Central time

== Game summaries ==
=== Washington State ===
Team	1	2	3	4	Total
Washington State	0	10	0	7	17
• Oklahoma State	17	21	13	14	65

- Location: Stillwater, Oklahoma
- Game start: 6:11 p.m.
- Elapsed time: 3:28
- Game attendance: 48,962
- Game weather: 84 °F (29 °C), Sunny
- Referee: Greg Burks
- Television network: FSN

=== Troy ===
Team	1	2	3	4	Total
Troy	3	24	3	8	38
• Oklahoma State	3	17	14	7	41

- Location: Stillwater, Oklahoma
- Game start: 6:05 p.m.
- Elapsed time: 3:24
- Game attendance: 48,820
- Game weather: 86 °F (30 °C), Sunny
- Referee: Scott Novak

=== Tulsa ===
Team	1	2	3	4	Total
Tulsa	0	7	7	14	28
• Oklahoma State	20	21	17	7	65

- Location: Stillwater, Oklahoma
- Game start: 6:05 p.m.
- Elapsed time: 3:17
- Game attendance: 51,778
- Game weather: 91 °F (33 °C), Sunny
- Referee: Matt Loeffler

=== Texas A&M ===
Team	1	2	3	4	Total
Texas A&M	14	7	0	14	35
• #24 Oklahoma State	0	7	21	10	38

- Location: Stillwater, Oklahoma
- Game start: 6:46 p.m.
- Elapsed time: 3:44
- Game attendance: 48,284
- Game weather: 76 °F (24 °C), Sunny
- Referee: Mike Defee
- TV announcers (ESPN): Rece Davis (play-by-play), Craig James & Jesse Palmer (color), Jenn Brown (sideline)

=== Louisiana–Lafayette ===
Team	1	2	3	4	Total
• #21 Oklahoma State	10	7	24	13	54
Louisiana–Lafayette	0	21	7	0	28

- Location: Lafayette, Louisiana
- Game start: 8:05 p.m.
- Elapsed time: 3:48
- Game attendance: 25,881
- Game weather: 78 °F (26 °C), Clear
- Referee: Tony Backert
- Television network: ESPN2

=== Texas Tech ===
Team	1	2	3	4	Total
• #18 Oklahoma State	21	3	7	3	34
Texas Tech	0	14	3	0	17

- Location: Lubbock, Texas
- Game start: 2:40 p.m.
- Elapsed time: 3:10
- Game attendance: 60,454
- Game weather: 74 °F (23 °C), Mostly Sunny
- Referee: Dan Romero
- Television network: FSN Plus

=== Nebraska ===
Team	1	2	3	4	Total
• #13 Nebraska	14	17	10	10	51
#15 Oklahoma State	13	14	7	7	41

- Location: Stillwater, Oklahoma
- Game start: 2:30 p.m.
- Game attendance: 55,935
- Television network: ABC

=== Kansas State ===
Team	1	2	3	4	Total
• #20 Oklahoma State	7	10	7	0	24
Kansas State	7	0	7	0	14

- Location: Manhattan, Kansas
- Game start: 6:00 p.m.
- Game attendance: 50,831

=== Baylor ===
Team	1	2	3	4	Total
Baylor	0	0	14	14	28
• #18 Oklahoma State	10	14	17	14	55

- Location: Stillwater, Oklahoma
- Game start: 11:30 a.m.
- Game attendance: 50,741
- Television network: FSN

=== Texas ===
Team	1	2	3	4	Total
• #11 Oklahoma State	3	23	7	0	33
Texas	3	0	0	13	16

- Location: Austin, Texas
- Game start: 7:00 p.m.
- Game attendance: 100,659
- Television network: ABC

=== Kansas ===
Team	1	2	3	4	Total
• #10 Oklahoma State	10	10	14	14	48
Kansas	14	0	0	0	14

- Location: Lawrence, Kansas
- Game start: 11:00 a.m.
- Game attendance: 39,261
- Television network: FSN

=== Oklahoma ===
Bedlam Game

Team	1	2	3	4	Total
• #13 Oklahoma	7	17	0	23	47
#9 Oklahoma State	3	14	7	17	41

- Location: Stillwater, Oklahoma
- Game start: 7:00 pm
- Television network: ABC

=== Arizona ===
Alamo Bowl

Team	1	2	3	4	Total
• #14 Oklahoma State	17	6	10	3	36
Arizona	7	0	3	0	10

- Location: San Antonio, Texas
- Game start: 8:15 pm
- Television network: ESPN

== Rankings ==
Ranking movements Legend: ██ Increase in ranking ██ Decrease in ranking RV = Received votes
	Week															
Poll	Pre	1	2	3	4	5	6	7	8	9	10	11	12	13	14	Final
AP	RV	RV	RV	RV	RV	22	20	17	20	19	12	12	10	16	16	13
Coaches	RV	RV	RV	25	24	21	18	15	20	18	11	10	9	15	13	10
Harris	Not released						18	15	20	18	13	12	9	16	15	Not released
BCS	Not released							14	17	17	10	10	9	14	14	Not released

== Awards and honors ==
- Justin Blackmon – Fred Biletnikoff Award, Unanimous First-team All-American
- Kendall Hunter – Consensus First-team All-American

== 2011 NFL draft ==
Player	Position	Round	Pick	Franchise
Kendall Hunter	Running back	4	115	San Francisco 49ers
