= 2010 Iowa State Cyclones football team =

American college football season

2010 Iowa State Cyclones football
- Conference: Big 12 Conference
- North Division
- Record: 5–7 (3–5 Big 12)
- Head coach: Paul Rhoads (2nd season)
- Offensive coordinator: Tom Herman (2nd season)
- Offensive scheme: Spread
- Defensive coordinator: Wally Burnham (2nd season)
- Base defense: 4–3
- Home stadium: Jack Trice Stadium

2010 Big 12 Conference football standings
	Conf.			Overall
Team	W		L	W		L
North Division
No. 20 Nebraska xy	6	–	2	10	–	4
No. 18 Missouri x	6	–	2	10	–	3
Kansas State	3	–	5	7	–	6
Iowa State	3	–	5	5	–	7
Colorado	2	–	6	5	–	7
Kansas	1	–	7	3	–	9
South Division
No. 6 Oklahoma xy$	6	–	2	12	–	2
No. 13 Oklahoma State x	6	–	2	11	–	2
No. 19 Texas A&M x	6	–	2	9	–	4
Baylor	4	–	4	7	–	6
Texas Tech	3	–	5	8	–	5
Texas	2	–	6	5	–	7
Championship: Oklahoma 23, Nebraska 20
$ – BCS representative as conference champion; x – Division champion/co-champions; y – Championship game participant; Rankings from AP Poll

The 2010 Iowa State Cyclones football team represented Iowa State University as a member of the North Division in the Big 12 Conference during the 2010 NCAA Division I FBS football season. Led by second-year head coach Paul Rhoads, the Cyclones compiled an overall record of 5–7 with a mark of 3–5 in conference play, tying for third place in the Big 12's North Division. The team played home games at Jack Trice Stadium in Ames, Iowa.

== Schedule ==
Date	Time	Opponent	Site	TV	Result	Attendance	Source
September 2	7:00 p.m.	Northern Illinois*	Jack Trice Stadium; Ames, IA	FSN	W 27–10	43,116	
September 11	2:30 p.m.	at No. 10 Iowa*	Kinnick Stadium; Iowa City, IA (rivalry)	ABC, ESPN2	L 7–35	70,585	
September 18	11:00 a.m.	vs. Kansas State	Arrowhead Stadium; Kansas City, MO (rivalry)	FSN	L 20–27	38,468	
September 25	6:00 p.m.	Northern Iowa*	Jack Trice Stadium; Ames, IA	MC22	W 27–0	48,874	
October 2	6:00 p.m.	Texas Tech	Jack Trice Stadium; Ames, IA	FCS Central	W 52–38	43,162	
October 9	6:00 p.m.	No. 10 Utah*	Jack Trice Stadium; Ames, IA	FCS Central	L 27–68	43,195	
October 16	6:00 p.m.	at No. 6 Oklahoma	Gaylord Family Oklahoma Memorial Stadium; Norman, OK	FSN	L 0–52	84,024	
October 23	11:00 a.m.	at No. 22 Texas	Darrell K Royal–Texas Memorial Stadium; Austin, TX	FSN	W 28–21	100,142	
October 30	1:00 p.m.	Kansas^{†}	Jack Trice Stadium; Ames, IA		W 28–16	46,485	
November 6	2:30 p.m.	No. 9 Nebraska	Jack Trice Stadium; Ames, IA (rivalry)	ABC	L 30–31 ^{OT}	51,159	
November 13	12:30 p.m.	at Colorado	Folsom Field; Boulder, CO	FCS Central	L 14–34	42,722	
November 20	6:00 p.m.	No. 15 Missouri	Jack Trice Stadium; Ames, IA (rivalry)	FSN	L 0–14	41,776	
*Non-conference game; ^{†}Homecoming; Rankings from AP Poll released prior to the game; All times are in Central time

== Game summaries ==
=== Northern Illinois ===
Northern Illinois Huskies at Iowa State Cyclones

Team	1	2	3	4	Total
Northern Illinois	0	0	3	7	10
• Iowa State	7	10	0	10	27

- Date: September 2
- Location: Jack Trice Stadium, Ames, IA
- Game attendance: 43,116
- TV announcers (FSN): Steve Physioc (Play-by-play) & Joel Klatt (Color)

The Cyclones received the opening kickoff and started strong, dominating the first half of play. On the fifth play of the game Austen Arnaud rushed for the game's first touchdown, a 53 yd scamper around the left side, but the play was nullified due to an illegal procedure. The Cyclones drove down to the NIU 26 where the Huskies held. A Grant Mahoney field goal attempt was missed wide left. The Huskies took the ball, driving to the ISU 32 where the Cyclones' Defense stiffened, creating a 4th down situation. A field goal attempt by the Huskies was no good. They Cyclones' taking over on downs drove on an 11 play, 68 yds, finding the endzone on a 2-yard run by QB Austen Arnaud, for the first score of the game. The score stood 7–0 at the end of the first quarter. The Cyclones took the ball back on a Zac Sandvig interception on the first play of the second quarter. On the next play, Robinson raced 63 yds for his first touchdown of the night. The extra point would make the score 14–0. After a three and out by the Huskies the Cyclones took the ball back over on a punt at their own territory, driving to the Huskies' 23 yd line before stalling. Grant Mahoney made a 41-yard field goal to push the Cyclone lead to 17. The Cyclone defense held strong on the next Huskies' possession, forcing a punt. The Cyclones took over and drove over 40 yards into Huskie territory before fumbling the ball, returning possession to the Huskies. The Cyclone Defense again flexed its muscles holding for a three and out taking the ball over on a punt deep in their own territory. Austen Arnaud would be picked off on the resulting drive setting up the Huskies with excellent field position right before the half. Again, a strong Cyclone Defense stiffened holding to three plays setting up a fourth down field goal attempt for the Huskies at the ISU 16. Coach Paul Rhoads would ice the Huskies on twice before the 33 yard attempt failed (as did the previous two attempts). The Cyclones took a 17–0 lead into the half.

The Huskies came out of the locker room ready, driving 67 yds on the opening drive of the second half in 10 plays down to the ISU 2 yard line. On the next three plays the Cyclone Defense held firm, not giving up a single yard forcing the Huskies to attempt a field goal. The chip shot was good cutting into the Iowa State lead, 17–3. ISU and NIU would exchange interceptions, each deep inside the opponents' territory to close out the third quarter. The Cyclones entered the fourth with the ball but the drive stalled forcing the only punt of the evening for the Cyclones, an 18 yarder, giving the ball back to the Huskies at the ISU 40. The Huskies would finally capitalize on the excellent field position, capping off a 9 play 40 yd drive with a touchdown to cut the lead to 17–10 early in the fourth quarter. With the lead shrinking the Cyclones needed a score after being held without points since the 8:30 mark in the 2nd Quarter, and they responded. The Cyclones offense drove down the field capping off a 73 yd drive on 10 plays with a 5 yd run by Robinson for his second touchdown of the game. The extra point pushed the lead to 24–10. With time running out, the Huskies took over at their own twenty following the touchback, and on the second play of the possession threw an interception to ISU's Jake Knott and returned it to the NIU 13. The Cyclones pushed the ball forward to the 5 yd line facing a 4th and 2 situation. The Cyclones called on Mahoney, nailing a 23 yd field goal attempt making the score 27–10. A three and out by the Huskies gave the ball back to the Cyclones, and ISU ran out the clock.

=== Iowa ===
Iowa State Cyclones at #10 Iowa Hawkeyes

Team	1	2	3	4	Total
Iowa State	0	0	0	7	7
• #10 Iowa	7	21	7	0	35

- Date: September 11
- Location: Kinnick Stadium, Iowa City, IA
- Game attendance: 70,585
- TV announcers (ABC/ESPN2): Ron Franklin (Play-by-play) & Ed Cunningham (Color)

The Iowa Hawkeyes and the Iowa State Cyclones last met in the previous season, with Iowa winning 35–3. Iowa leads the all-time series 38–19. The winner will receive the Cy-Hawk Trophy.

=== Kansas State ===
Kansas State Wildcats vs. Iowa State Cyclones

Team	1	2	3	4	Total
• Kansas State	3	7	7	10	27
Iowa State	0	7	10	3	20

- Date: September 18
- Location: Arrowhead Stadium, Kansas City, MO
- Game attendance: 38,468
- TV announcers (FSN): Bill Land (Play-by-play), Dave Lapham (Color) & Emily Jones (Sideline)

The Kansas State Wildcats and the Iowa State Cyclones last met up in Arrowhead Stadium in Kansas City, Missouri. A back and forth game eventually ended up the Cyclones having the last chance for victory but fell short with the final score 27–20 Kansas State.

=== Northern Iowa ===
Northern Iowa Panthers at Iowa State Cyclones

Team	1	2	3	4	Total
Northern Iowa	0	0	0	0	0
• Iowa State	3	10	14	0	27

- Date: September 25
- Location: Jack Trice Stadium, Ames, IA
- Game attendance: 48,874
- TV announcers (MC22): BJ Schaben (Play-by-play) & Ben Bruns (Color)

The Northern Iowa Panthers marked the fourth game on the Cyclones schedule. The Cyclones started slow, having a three and out to the Panther defense. Well the Panthers took over and moved the ball down field, a turnover would give the ball back to the Cyclones. The Cyclones in turn would take it down into Panther territory before settling for a field goal. But the Cyclones never looked back. The Cyclones took a 13–0 lead into the half and two "pick 6's" in the third quarter would put the game out of reach for they Panthers. While the Panthers moved the ball quite well, the Cyclone's defense stiffened when it needed to, forcing five Panther turnovers. The Cyclones shut out the Panthers 27–0, marking the first shutout victory since a 23–0 victory over the same UNI Panthers in 2004.

=== Texas Tech ===
Texas Tech Red Raiders at Iowa State Cyclones

Team	1	2	3	4	Total
Texas Tech	0	14	10	14	38
• Iowa State	0	24	0	28	52

- Date: October 2
- Location: Jack Trice Stadium, Ames, IA
- Game attendance: 43,162
- TV announcers (FCS): Steve Physioc (Play-by-play), Yogi Roth (Color) & Samantha Steele (Sideline)

The Red Raiders came into Jack Trice Stadium holding a 2–1 record with the lone loss coming in conference play. The game appeared it would be a struggle early, with each defense shutting down the opposing offense. That quickly changed as the Cyclones motored out to a 24–0 lead with all points scored in the first 12 minutes of the second quarter. Tech showed fight right before half driving down field quickly to score their first TD with 0:45 seconds left. They Cyclones were held on their next three plays from scrimmage faced a punting situation, the snap went over the head of the punter and would be turned over to the Red Raiders. The Red Raiders' second TD would come two plays later cutting the Cyclone lead to 24–14 at half. Tech came out of the half fired up and quickly tied the game at 24 a piece with five minutes remaining in the 3rd. The Cyclones responded driving down field in five plays to score their 4th TD. A Tech fumble on the ensuing drive set up good field position for the Cyclones. They only needed one play, a 60 yd scamper to the endzone to take a two TD lead. Tech would cut the score to one possession at 38–31. The next possession for the Cyclones would be drawn out for a long six minutes as time wound down in the 4th quarter. A short TD pass would put the Cyclones up 45–31. With a little under four minutes left in the game Tech would drive the field in about two minutes and cut the lead back down to seven. With only a minute and a half remaining on the clock, Tech was forced to onside. On the ensuing kickoff, Jeremy Reeves would corral the ball and see daylight, scampering down the left sideline for an inexplicable Iowa State touchdown, Their First on a Kickoff return since 1994, and only the second ever in Jack Trice Stadium History. This would be the final dagger. Iowa State would win 52–38. This would end up being the most points scored in a game by the Cyclones in more than a decade... most in a conference game since the 1970s. The win puts the overall series record at 2–6.

=== Utah ===
#10 Utah Utes at Iowa State Cyclones

Team	1	2	3	4	Total
• #10 Utah	10	31	17	10	68
Iowa State	14	0	6	7	27

- Date: October 2
- Location: Jack Trice Stadium, Ames, IA
- Game attendance: 43,195
- TV announcers (FCS): Steve Physioc (Play-by-play), Yogi Roth (Color) & Samantha Steele (Sideline)

The first of three ranked foe faced the Cyclones in a brutal upcoming schedule. The #10 Utah Utes came to Jack Trice Stadium having never beaten Iowa State. After a competitive first quarter of the game with each team trading off scoring drives, the game quickly got out of hand for Iowa State. The Cyclones took a 14–10 lead into the second quarter. That's when the Utes would begin scoring at will, collecting 31 unanswered points in the 2nd quarter alone. Utah lead at the half 41–14. Utah picked up right where they left off kicking another field goal before Iowa State could get to the board again. After the 3rd the score stood at 58–20. The Utes picked up their first victory ever against the Cyclones as they closed out the game with an impressive 68–27 final.

=== Oklahoma ===
Iowa State Cyclones at #6 Oklahoma Sooners

Team	1	2	3	4	Total
Iowa State	0	0	0	0	0
• #6 Oklahoma	10	21	14	7	52

- Date: October 16
- Location: Gaylord Family Oklahoma Memorial Stadium, Norman, OK
- Game attendance: 84,024
- TV announcers (FSN): Bill Land (Play-by-play), Joel Klatt (Color) & Emily Jones (Sideline)

=== Texas ===
Iowa State Cyclones at #22 Texas Longhorns

Team	1	2	3	4	Total
• Iowa State	7	7	7	7	28
#22 Texas	0	3	3	15	21

- Date: October 23
- Location: Darrell K Royal–Texas Memorial Stadium, Austin, TX
- Game attendance: 100,142
- TV announcers (FSN): Bill Land (Play-by-play), Dave Lapham (Color) & Jim Knox (Sideline)
- Source: ESPN

Scoring summary
1	6:37	ISU	Darius Reynolds 19 yard pass from Austen Arnaud (Grant Mahoney kick)	ISU 7–0
2	14:05	TEX	Justin Tucker 23 yard field goal	ISU 7–3
2	9:23	ISU	Alexander Robinson 1 yard run (Grant Mahoney kick)	ISU 14–3
3	7:34	TEX	Justin Tucker 21 yard field goal	ISU 14–6
3	2:42	ISU	Josh Lenz 15 yard pass from Austen Arnaud (Grant Mahoney kick)	ISU 21–6
4	12:47	ISU	Alexander Robinson 20 yard run (Grant Mahoney kick)	ISU 28–6
4	11:16	TEX	John Chiles 17 yard pass from Garrett Gilbert (Garrett Gilbert run)	ISU 28–14
4	3:15	TEX	Malcolm Williams 9 yard pass from Garrett Gilbert (Justin Tucker kick)	ISU 28–21

The Cyclones picked up their first victory ever against the Texas Longhorns. This also marks the first time a game crowd of over 100,000 people watched a Cyclone victory.

=== Kansas ===
Kansas Jayhawks at Iowa State Cyclones

Team	1	2	3	4	Total
Kansas	6	3	0	7	16
• Iowa State	0	7	21	0	28

- Date: October 30
- Location: Jack Trice Stadium, Ames, IA
- Game attendance: 46,485

The Cyclones came out in the first half flat, only giving up a fumble and two 'three and outs' on three possessions in the first quarter. The Jayhawks took a 6–0 lead on field goals to close out the first. The only bright spot for the Cyclones in the first half came from Josh Lenz in the second quarter as he returned a punt for touchdown. Kansas led 9–7 at the half with a last second field goal to close the half.

From there on, the Cyclones took over, rattling off 21 unanswered points in the 3rd quarter to take a commanding lead. A Kansas score with 10 seconds left in the 4th quarter cut the score to 28–16 in the Cyclone's victory. This was the first Cyclone win against the Jayhawks since a 13–7 win in Ames in 2004.

=== Nebraska ===
#9 Nebraska Cornhuskers at Iowa State Cyclones

Team	1	2	3	4	OT	Total
• #9 Nebraska	0	7	17	0	7	31
Iowa State	0	10	0	14	6	30

- Date: November 6
- Location: Jack Trice Stadium, Ames, IA
- Game attendance: 51,159
- TV announcers (ABC): Dave Pasch (Play-by-play), Bob Griese (Color), Chris Spielman (Color) & Quint Kessenich (Sideline)

This game marks the last regularly scheduled game of a 105-year-old rivalry between the Cyclones and Cornhuskers. Nebraska will join the Big Ten in 2011. The game ended when ISU failed to convert a fake extra point in OT to win the game.

=== Colorado ===
Iowa State Cyclones at Colorado Buffaloes

Team	1	2	3	4	Total
Iowa State	0	7	0	7	14
• Colorado	3	14	10	7	34

- Date: November 13
- Location: Folsom Field, Boulder, CO
- Game attendance: 42,722
- TV announcers (FCS): Steve Physioc (Play-by-play), Yogi Roth (Color) & Samanatha Steele (Sideline)

=== Missouri ===
#15 Missouri Tigers at Iowa State Cyclones

Team	1	2	3	4	Total
• #15 Missouri	7	0	0	7	14
Iowa State	0	0	0	0	0

- Date: November 20
- Location: Jack Trice Stadium, Ames, IA
- Game attendance: 41,776
- TV announcers (FSN): Joel Meyers (Play-by-play), Joel Klatt (Color) & Emily Jones (Sideline)

== Personnel ==
=== Coaching staff ===
Paul Rhoads was hired on December 20, 2008 to be Iowa State's new head coach. His contract was reported to be a 5-year deal worth $5.75 million.

- Head coach: Paul Rhoads (Missouri Western '89)
- Offensive coordinator, quarterbacks: Tom Herman (California Lutheran '97)
- Defensive coordinator, linebackers: Wally Burnham (Samford '63)
- Assistant head coach, offensive Line: Bill Bleil (Northwestern College [IA] '82)
- Wide receivers: Luke Wells (Oklahoma '01)
- Tight ends: Courtney Messingham (Northern Iowa '90)
- Defensive tackles: Shane Burnham (South Carolina '98)
- Defensive line: Curtis Bray (Pittsburgh '92)
- Secondary, recruiting coordinator: Bobby Elliott (Iowa '75)
- Running backs: Kenith Pope (Oklahoma '76)
- Director of strength and conditioning: Yancy McKnight (Missouri Southern State '01)
- Assistant strength and conditioning coach: Clayton Oyster (Otterbein [OH] '02)
- Director of operations: Brian Schwartze (Central Methodist University '95)
- Assistant director of football operations: Markus Alleyne (Concordia University [Canada] '07)
- Assistant recruiting coordinator: Ryan McKim (Iowa State '08)
- Offensive graduate assistant: Thomas Howe
- Defensive graduate assistant: Nick Caley
- Offensive quality control graduate assistant: Ryan Belsher
- Defensive quality Control graduate assistant: Ben Barkema
- Strength and conditioning graduate assistant: James Harris

=== Roster ===
Number	Player
#1	Sims, David
#2	Johnson, Sedrick
#3	Sandvig, Zac
#4	Arnaud, Austen
#5	Reeves, Jeremy
#5	Reynolds, Darius
#6	Darks, Darius
#7	Khuter, Sam
#8	Bueker, Brett
#8	Carlson, Jason
#10	Range, Lonzie
#10	Washington, Jacques
#11	Tiller, Jerome
#12	Capello, James
#14	Broomfield, Deon
#14	Pawell, Chad
#16	Kuehi, Daniel
#17	Brooks, Earl
#18	Boyer, Wes
#19	Lenz, Josh
#20	Knott, Jake

Number	Player
#21	Mahoney, Grant
#21	Watson, Jansen
#22	Benton, Ter'ran
#22	White, James
#23	Johnson, Leonard
#24	Weber, David
#25	Guyer, Zach
#26	Mansfield, Taylor
#27	Romey, Michael
#29	Parker, Rashawn
#32	Woody, Jeff
#33	Robinson, Alexander
#34	Williams, Bo
#35	Brummel, Jay
#35	Ewald, Vince
#36	Mulcahy, Patrick
#37	O'Connell, Michael
#38	Maggitt, Roosevelt
#39	Morton, Matt
#40	Tucker, Zac

Number	Player
#42	Blankenship, Beau
#42	Fountain, Tahaun
#44	Hamlin, Kevin
#45	Tau'fo'ou, Mat
#46	Zimmerman, Dakota
#47	Klein, A.J.
#48	Adams, Brad
#48	Lattimer, Jacob
#50	Scott, Willie
#50	Smith, Sean
#51	Haughton, Scott
#52	Bangtson, Mike
#52	Stonerook, Grant
#53	Jacobs, Joe
#59	Kaufman, Preston
#60	Moran-Hoyne, Taimon
#61	Murray, Cameron
#63	Lamaak, Ben
#65	Mitchell, Bredell
#66	Tuftee, Ethan
#69	Lichtenberg, Kyle

Number	Player
#70	Davis, Drew
#71	Baysinger, Trey
#72	Osemele, Kelechi
#75	Hicks, Hayworth
#76	Spears, Zack
#77	Alvarez, Alex
#79	Burris, Brayden
#80	Mitchell, Andrew
#81	Klacik, Michael
#83	Williams, Jake
#85	Jennert, Donnie
#85	Johnson, Bailey
#86	Hammerschmidt, Kurt
#87	Bykowski, Carter
#88	Franklin, Collin
#89	Blanton, Jr., Keith
#90	Laing, Cleyon
#91	Neal, Patrick
#92	Hatfield, Duane
#93	Anker, Sam

Number	Player
#93	Moore, Aaron
#94	McDonough, Jake
#95	Woods III, Walter
#96	Alburtis, Austin
#97	Ruempolhamer, Stephen
#98	Black, Jerrod
#99	Norton, Matt
NA	Baldwin, Tab
NA	Behnkendorf, Andrew
NA	Caspers, Jon
NA	Dinkins, Ben
NA	Gent, Ryan
NA	Gregg, Gary
NA	Hawley, Jace
NA	Hill-Male, Jacob
NA	Howard, Ricky
NA	Kirkpatrick, Klayton
NA	Kirpes, Carl
NA	McBeth, Austin
NA	Nelson, Rony

Number	Player
NA	Porth, Ben
NA	Pritchard, Anthony
NA	Satre, Thad
NA	Smith, Kiandre
NA	Van Dyke, Matt
NA	Woods, Walker Lee
NA	Young, Anthony

=== Recruiting ===
College recruiting information
Name	Hometown	School	Height	Weight	40^{‡}	Commit date
Anthony Young; DB	San Marcos, CA	Palomar C.C.	5 ft 9 in (1.75 m)	180 lb (82 kg)	4.5	Dec 13, 2009
Anthony Young; DB	Recruit ratings: Scout: Rivals:					
Rony Nelson; DE	Marysville, CA	Yuba C.C.	6 ft 2 in (1.88 m)	250 lb (110 kg)	–	Dec 14, 2009
Rony Nelson; DE	Recruit ratings: Scout: Rivals:					
Ricky Howard; TE	Rancho Cucamonga, CA	Yuba C.C.	6 ft 5 in (1.96 m)	255 lb (116 kg)	–	Jul 2, 2009
Ricky Howard; TE	Recruit ratings: Scout: Rivals:					
Jon Caspers; OL	Wahpeton, North Dakota	North Dakota State College of Science	6 ft 5 in (1.96 m)	295 lb (134 kg)	4.9	Nov 16, 2009
Jon Caspers; OL	Recruit ratings: Scout: Rivals:					
Overall recruit ranking: Scout: 71 Rivals: 52
‡ Refers to 40-yard dash; Note: In many cases, Scout, Rivals, 247Sports, On3, and ESPN may conflict in their listings of height, weight and 40 time.; In these cases, the average was taken. ESPN grades are on a 100-point scale.; Sources: "Iowa State 2010 Football Commitments". Rivals.; "2010 Iowa State Commits". Scout.; "2010 Player Commitments – Iowa State". ESPN.; "Scout.com Team Recruiting Rankings". Scout.; "2010 Team Ranking". Rivals.com.
