= Adrian Hilburn =

American college football player

Profile
- Position: Wide receiver

Career information
- College: San Francisco City College (?); Kansas State (2008–2009)

Adrian Hilburn is a former college football athlete for the Kansas State Wildcats in Manhattan, Kansas, US.

Hilburn's arrival at Kansas State brought with it hopes to help replace All-America wideout Jordy Nelson. Then Kansas State head coach Ron Prince pointed to Hilburn's time at San Francisco City College as "impressive so far". Hilburn later played under head coach Bill Snyder for the Wildcats.

In the 2010 Pinstripe Bowl, Hilburn was penalized for unsportsmanlike conduct following a 30-yard touchdown when he saluted the crowd. Kansas State then had to attempt (and failed) a two-point conversion from the 17-yard line. Due to the impact from this event, the NCAA chose in the next year's rule changes to not penalize celebrating in general but to penalize only taunting. The call was considered highly controversial and, according to ESPN, determined the outcome of the game.
