= 2010 Texas Bowl =

Illinois Fighting Illini	Baylor Bears
(6–6)	(7–5)
Big Ten	Big 12
38	14
Head coach: Ron Zook	Head coach: Art Briles
	1	2	3	4	Total
Illinois	6	10	8	14	38
Baylor	0	0	7	7	14
- Date: December 29, 2010
- Season: 2010
- Stadium: Reliant Stadium
- Location: Houston, Texas
- MVP: RB Mikel Leshoure, Illinois
- Favorite: Baylor by 1
- Referee: Michael Batlan (Pac-10)
- Attendance: 68,211

United States TV coverage
- Network: ESPN
- Announcers: Dave Pasch, Bob Griese, Chris Spielman and Holly Rowe
- Nielsen ratings: 2.7

The 2010 Texas Bowl was the fifth edition of the college football bowl game, and was played at Reliant Stadium in Houston, Texas. The game started at 5:00 p.m. US CST on Wednesday, December 29, 2010. The game was telecast on ESPN for the second time in bowl history after being televised by the NFL Network for the first three games. The bowl matched the sixth selection from the Big 12 Conference, Baylor, versus the sixth selection from the Big Ten Conference, Illinois.

== Pre-game ==
By December 8, three days after the announcement of the participating teams, approximately 60,000 of the stadium's 70,000 seats had been purchased; bowl officials anticipated the bowl's first-ever sellout. Baylor announced the same day that all but 400 of its 12,000-ticket allotment had been sold and that the athletics department had requested more tickets from the Texas Bowl.

== Teams ==
=== Illinois ===
After a disappointing 6-6 season Illinois returns to a bowl game to face Baylor. Illinois boasts Mikel Leshoure who emerged as the Big Ten's best running back this season, ranking eighth nationally in rushing with 126.1 yards per game. Illinois has not won a bowl game since 1999 when they defeated Virginia in the MicronPC.com Bowl. The game will also mark the Fighting Illini's first appearance in the Texas Bowl.

=== Baylor ===
Baylor enters the Texas Bowl with a 7-5 record. After a 7-2 start the Bears lost their last 3 contests. Baylor boasts 5 receivers with at least 40 catches in their high-powered offense. The Bears will be playing in their first Texas Bowl. This is their first bowl appearance since the 1994 Alamo Bowl where they lost to the high powered Washington State Cougars.

== Game Summary ==
=== Scoring ===
Scoring Play	Score
1st Quarter
ILL - Derek Dimke 38 yard kick, 11:03	ILL 3-0
ILL - Derek Dimke 28 yard kick, 3:45	ILL 6-0
2nd Quarter
ILL - Derek Dimke 43 yard kick, 13:51	ILL 9-0
ILL - Mikel Leshoure 5-yard run (Derek Dimke kick), 9:42	ILL 16-0
3rd Quarter
ILL - Mikel Leshoure 13-yard run (Two-point conversion), 11:40	ILL 24-0
BAY - Jay Finley 3-yard run (Aaron Jones kick), 8:03	ILL 24-7
4th Quarter
BAY - Robert Griffin III 39-yard pass to Kendall Wright (Aaron Jones kick), 13:43	ILL 24-14
ILL - Mikel Leshoure 5-yard run (Derek Dimke kick), 7:14	ILL 31-14
ILL - Nathan Scheelhaase 55-yard run (Derek Dimke kick), 0:41	ILL 38-14

=== Statistics ===
Statistics	Illinois	Baylor
First downs	25	24
Total offense, plays-yards	547	434
Rushes-yards (net)	306	105
Passes, Comp-Att-Yds	18-23-241	32-44-329
Fumbles-Interceptions	0-0	2-0
Time of Possession	33:15	26:45

== Notes ==
This was the second time that the two programs have met in a game. Baylor was a 34-19 winner over Illinois in their only previous meeting at Champaign, Illinois on September 25, 1976.
