= 2010 Pinstripe Bowl =

2010 New Era Pinstripe Bowl
- Inaugural Pinstripe Bowl
Kansas State Wildcats	Syracuse Orange
(7–5)	(7–5)
Big 12	Big East
34	36
Head coach: Bill Snyder	Head coach: Doug Marrone
	1	2	3	4	Total
Kansas State	7	7	7	13	34
Syracuse	7	7	13	9	36
- Date: December 30, 2010
- Season: 2010
- Stadium: Yankee Stadium
- Location: Bronx, New York
- Favorite: Even
- Referee: Todd Geerlings (Big Ten)
- Attendance: 38,274
- Payout: US$2,000,000 per team

United States TV coverage
- Network: ESPN
- Announcers: Bob Wischusen and Brian Griese
- Nielsen ratings: 2.26

The 2010 New Era Pinstripe Bowl was the first edition of this college football bowl game, and was played at Yankee Stadium in Bronx, New York. The game started at 3:20 p.m. ET on December 30, 2010, and was telecast on ESPN. The game featured the Syracuse Orange of the Big East Conference and the Kansas State Wildcats of the Big 12 Conference. New Era Cap Company was the title sponsor of the game. It ended with Syracuse defeating Kansas State, 36–34.

The game was played four days after one of the worst blizzards in New York City history, affecting travel for the teams and their fans.

== Teams ==
=== Kansas State Wildcats ===
Kansas State officially accepted an invitation to the bowl on December 3, 2010, after completing a 7–5 regular season. The bowl marked the Wildcats return to post-season for the first time since 2006. It was the 14th bowl game in school history for K-State. Coach Bill Snyder coached the Wildcats in all but two of their previous bowls.

=== Syracuse Orange ===
Syracuse officially accepted an invitation to the bowl on December 3, 2010. Second year head coach Doug Marrone, who grew up in the Bronx, just minutes from the old Yankee Stadium led the Orange to a 7–5 record and their first bowl game since the 2004 Champs Sports Bowl. Syracuse was required to win seven games in order to become bowl-eligible as two of their victories came over Football Championship Subdivision opponents. Only one of the victories is allowed to count toward bowl eligibility.

== Game summary ==
Despite the cold weather, both teams had strong offensive performances, with Delone Carter rushing for 198 yards and two touchdowns, while Ryan Nassib threw for 239 yards and three touchdowns, with Marcus Sales catching all three of them for 172 yards. The game's outcome was ultimately decided by a controversial taunting penalty on Adrian Hilburn, which led to Kansas State attempting a game-tying two-point conversion from the 17-yard line. Syracuse's defense held strong, and they won the game 36–34.

=== Controversial Taunting call ===
With 1:13 left in the game, Kansas State's Adrian Hilburn scored a 30-yard touchdown to pull KSU within two points of a tie. Following the score, Hilburn made a military hand salute toward the crowd and was penalized for unsportsmanlike conduct. Because of the 15-yard penalty, Kansas State had to attempt a two-point conversion from the 17-yard line. The conversion failed, accounting for the margin in the final score. The call was considered highly controversial, and according to ESPN determined the outcome of the game.

=== Aftermath ===
Due to the impact from this call, the NCAA chose in the next year's rule changes to not penalize celebrating in general but to penalize only taunting. The call was called "one of the most infamous plays of the college football season in 2010" and was given the name "The Bronx Salute." It later was used as an example of incorrect interpretation of the new celebration rules.

=== Scoring ===
Scoring Play	Score
1st Quarter
KSU - Daniel Thomas 51-yard run (Josh Cherry kick), 14:32	KSU 7–0
SYR - Ryan Nassib 52-yard pass to Marcus Sales (Ross Krautman kick), 3:16	TIE 7-7
2nd Quarter
SYR - Ryan Nassib 36-yard pass to Marcus Sales (Ross Krautman kick), 9:35	SYR 14–7
KSU - Daniel Thomas 10-yard run (Josh Cherry kick), 1:51	TIE 14-14
3rd Quarter
SYR - Delone Carter 7-yard run (Ross Krautman kick), 12:11	SYR 21–14
KSU - Carson Coffman 10-yard pass to Chris Harper (Josh Cherry kick), 6:34	TIE 21-21
SYR - Delone Carter 15-yard run (Ross Krautman kick missed), 2:11	SYR 27–21
4th Quarter
KSU - Daniel Thomas 1-yard run (Josh Cherry kick), 11:03	KSU 28–27
SYR - Ryan Nassib 44-yard pass to Marcus Sales (Two-point conversion failed), 7:53	SYR 33–28
SYR - Ross Krautman 39-yard field goal, 3:08	SYR 36–28
KSU - Carson Coffman 30-yard pass to Adrian Hilburn (Two-Point Conversion Failed), 1:13	SYR 36–34

=== Statistics ===
Statistics	Kansas St.	Syracuse
First downs	19	23
Total offense, plays-yards	61-379	65-498
Rushes-yards (net)	121	259
Passes, Comp-Att-Yds	18-25-258	13–22–239
Fumbles-Interceptions	0-0	1–0
Time of Possession	31:38	28:22

== Notes ==
- This was the first bowl game played in New York since the 1962 Gotham Bowl (at old Yankee Stadium), where 6,166 fans saw Nebraska defeat Miami 36–34 on frozen turf.
- Syracuse and Kansas State met twice before in school history. All of their matchups have come in bowl games. K-State defeated the Orange in the 1997 Fiesta Bowl, 35-18 and the Orange were victorious by a score of 26–3 in the 2001 Insight.com Bowl. This was their first meeting outside the Phoenix Metropolitan Area.
- Senior Andrew Lewis and freshman Brice Hawkes were suspended for a rules violation by Syracuse head coach Doug Marrone.
- The final result of the 2010 Pinstripe Bowl was subject to criticism due to an "Excessive Celebration" Penalty against Kansas State (see section above: The Bronx Salute).
