= Dimeback =

American football term for a cornerback or safety who serves as the sixth defensive back

The dime defense (4 cornerbacks), lined up against 4 wide receivers on offense. A conventional dime formation would have 4 linemen and only one linebacker.

In American football, a dimeback is a cornerback or safety who serves as the sixth defensive back (fourth cornerback, third safety; and in some rare cases, a fourth safety) on defense. The third cornerback or safety on defense is known as a nickelback. The dimeback position is essentially relegated to backup cornerbacks and safeties who do not play starting cornerback or safety positions. Dimebacks are usually fast players because they must be able to keep up on passing plays with three or more wide receivers.

Dimebacks are brought into the game when the defense uses a dime formation, which uses six defensive backs rather than four or five. Usually, a dimeback replaces a linebacker in order to gain better pass defense, although some teams may substitute the extra defensive back for a defensive lineman in their dime formation.
