= Antwine Perez =

American football player (born 1988)

- Perez makes a tackle against Navy's Darius Staten in 2010

No. 2
- Position: Safety

Personal information
- Born: April 10, 1988 (age 38); Westville Grove, New Jersey, U.S.
- Listed height: 6 ft 1 in (1.85 m)
- Listed weight: 219 lb (99 kg)

Career information
- High school: Camden (NJ) Woodrow Wilson
- College: USC (2006); Maryland (2008–2010)

Antwine Perez (born April 10, 1988) is a former American college football player. He played as a free safety for the University of Maryland Terrapins. He played one season for the University of Southern California Trojans, before transferring. He was one of the most sought-after college recruits in the nation and received scholarship offers from over 40 schools.

== Early life ==
He was born on April 10, 1988 in the Westville Grove area of Westville, New Jersey, to parents Phyllis and Lewis Perez. He attended Woodrow Wilson High School in Camden, where he played high school football as a quarterback and defensive back. As a junior, he recorded 1,763 passing yards and 15 touchdowns, ten rushing touchdowns, 58 tackles, seven interceptions, and four forced fumbles. As a senior in 2005, he recorded 82 tackles, 10 deflections, seven interceptions, four forced fumbles, and three fumble recoveries.

He was named a Parade All-American, USA Today first-team All-American, EA Sports first-team All-American, SuperPrep All-American, PrepStar All-American, all-conference quarterback, all-conference defensive back, and first-team all-state player. Perez was honored as The Philadelphia Inquirer South Jersey Defensive Most Valuable Player, SuperPrep All-Northeast Defensive MVP, PrepStar All-Eastern, and Gatorade New Jersey Player of the Year. He was named to the SuperPrep Elite 50, PrepStar Dream Team, and the ESPN 150.

Perez was one of the most highly recruited players in the nation, and received in excess of forty scholarship offers. Scout.com rated him as a five-star prospect and fifth-ranked defensive back, while Rivals.com rated him as a four-star prospect and the second-ranked defensive back. At least 47 programs offered Perez, including USC, Florida, Georgia, LSU, Michigan, Nebraska, Ohio State, Oklahoma, Penn State, and Tennessee.

== College career ==
Perez graduated from high school a semester early and enrolled at the University of Southern California. As a true freshman in 2006, he saw action in seven games, primarily in a special teams role. Perez made brief appearances as a reserve free safety against Arkansas, Stanford, and Oregon. Perez decided to transfer to the University of Maryland with the hope of earning more playing time and to be closer to home. He was required by NCAA transfer rules to sit out for one season.

In 2008, he saw action in all 13 games including two starts as a free safety. He also served in a special teams role and at linebacker due to the injury of Adrian Moten, the back-up for Moise Fokou. He made his first career start in the upset win against California, where he replaced injured starter Terrell Skinner and recorded three tackles.

CBS Sports considers him the eighth-ranked free safety prospect for the 2011 NFL draft, while College Football News projected him as a possible fourth round selection if he had chosen to enter the 2010 NFL draft.

During the 2010 season against Duke, Perez intercepted one pass and delivered a hard hit to break up another critical pass late in the game, which preserved a Maryland victory, 21–16. At Boston College, Perez had two interceptions and forced a fumble to help Maryland to a 24–21 win. For his performance, he was named the Jim Thorpe Defensive Back of the Week.

Pre-draft measurables
Height	Weight	40-yard dash	10-yard split	20-yard split	20-yard shuttle	Three-cone drill	Vertical jump	Broad jump	Bench press
6 ft 1 1/8 in (1.86 m)	219 lb (99 kg)	4.79 s	1.74 s	2.73 s	4.44 s	7.06 s	28.0 in (0.71 m)	9 ft 5 in (2.87 m)	19 reps
All values from Pro Day
