= 2010 Maryland Terrapins football team =

American college football season

2010 Maryland Terrapins football
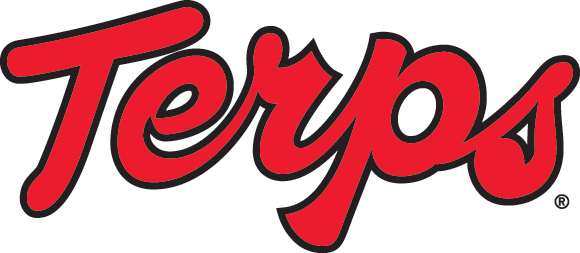

Military Bowl champion

Military Bowl, W 51–20 vs. East Carolina
- Conference: Atlantic Coast Conference
- Atlantic Division

Ranking
- Coaches: No. 24
- AP: No. 23
- Record: 9–4 (5–3 ACC)
- Head coach: Ralph Friedgen (10th season)
- Offensive coordinator: James Franklin (3rd season)
- Offensive scheme: West Coast
- Defensive coordinator: Don Brown (2nd season)
- Base defense: 4–3
- Home stadium: Byrd Stadium

Uniform

2010 Atlantic Coast Conference football standings
	Conf.			Overall
Team	W		L	W		L
Atlantic Division
No. 17 Florida State x	6	–	2	10	–	4
No. 23 Maryland	5	–	3	9	–	4
No. 25 NC State	5	–	3	9	–	4
Boston College	4	–	4	7	–	6
Clemson	4	–	4	6	–	7
Wake Forest	1	–	7	3	–	9
Coastal Division
No. 16 Virginia Tech x$	8	–	0	11	–	3
Miami (FL)	5	–	3	7	–	6
Georgia Tech	4	–	4	6	–	7
North Carolina	4	–	4	8	–	5
Duke	1	–	7	3	–	9
Virginia	1	–	7	4	–	8
Championship: Virginia Tech 44, Florida State 33
$ – BCS representative as conference champion; x – Division champion/co-champions; Rankings from AP Poll

The 2010 Maryland Terrapins football team represented the University of Maryland in the 2010 NCAA Division I FBS football season. It was the Terrapins' (also officially known as the "Terps") 58th season as a member of the Atlantic Coast Conference (ACC) and its sixth within the ACC's Atlantic Division. They played their home games at Byrd Stadium and were led by head coach Ralph Friedgen. Maryland finished the season 9–4 overall and 5–3 in ACC play. The Terrapins were invited to the Military Bowl, where they defeated East Carolina, 51–20.

Friedgen was fired at the end of the season. He was replaced on January 2, 2011, by Randy Edsall, who was the head coach at Connecticut for the previous 12 seasons (1999–2010).

As of 2026, this is Maryland's last season where they were ranked in the AP Poll at any point during the season.

== Schedule ==
Date	Time	Opponent	Site	TV	Result	Attendance	Source
September 6	4:00 pm	vs. Navy*	M&T Bank Stadium; Baltimore, MD (Crab Bowl Classic)	ESPN	W 17–14	69,348	
September 11	6:00 pm	Morgan State*	Byrd Stadium; College Park, MD	ESPN3	W 62–3	40,099	
September 18	12:00 pm	at No. 21 West Virginia*	Milan Puskar Stadium; Morgantown, WV (rivalry)	ESPNU	L 17–31	60,122	
September 25	12:00 pm	FIU*	Byrd Stadium; College Park, MD	ESPNU	W 42–28	33,254	
October 2	6:00 pm	Duke	Byrd Stadium; College Park, MD	ESPN3	W 21–16	39,106	
October 16	12:00 pm	at Clemson	Memorial Stadium; Clemson, SC	ACCN	L 7–31	72,484	
October 23	1:00 pm	at Boston College	Alumni Stadium; Chestnut Hill, MA	ESPN3	W 24–21	36,078	
October 30	3:30 pm	Wake Forest^{†}	Byrd Stadium; College Park, MD	ESPNU	W 62–14	39,063	
November 6	12:00 pm	at Miami (FL)	Sun Life Stadium; Miami Gardens, FL	ESPNU	L 20–26	55,434	
November 13	3:30 pm	at Virginia	Scott Stadium; Charlottesville, VA (rivalry)	ESPN3	W 42–23	45,634	
November 20	8:00 pm	Florida State	Byrd Stadium; College Park, MD	ABC	L 16–30	48,115	
November 27	3:30 pm	No. 21 NC State	Byrd Stadium; College Park, MD	ESPN2	W 38–31	35,370	
December 29	2:30 pm	vs. East Carolina*	Robert F. Kennedy Memorial Stadium; Washington, DC (Military Bowl)	ESPN	W 51–20	38,062	
*Non-conference game; ^{†}Homecoming; Rankings from AP Poll released prior to the game; All times are in Eastern time

== Before the season ==
The season prior, Maryland finished with a 2–10 (ACC 1–7) record, the worst in head coach Ralph Friedgen's tenure and the first ten-loss season in school history. Despite rumors to the contrary, Friedgen was retained, but then athletic director Deborah Yow stated the expectation was seven wins in the 2010 season.

=== Key losses ===
From the already inconsistent offensive line, Maryland lost left tackle Bruce Campbell and center Phil Costa. The 6-foot 7-inch, 310-pound Campbell elected to enter the NFL Draft a year early, and was selected in the fourth round by the Oakland Raiders. Backfield bulwark fullback Cory Jackson was lost to graduation, as was former starting quarterback Chris Turner. Other starters whose eligibility was exhausted were defensive tackle Travis Ivey, defensive ends Jared Harrell and Deege Galt, cornerback Anthony Wiseman, and safeties Jamari McCullough and Terrell Skinner.

=== Key returns ===
Maryland's offensive unit returned seven starters. Jamarr Robinson, the only returning quarterback with game experience, entered the season as the starter as expected. In 2009, he filled in for an injured Turner and completed 46 of 85 pass attempts for 459 yards, two touchdowns, and no interceptions. Former 1,000-yard rusher Da'Rel Scott amassed 425 yards and four touchdowns on 85 carries but sat out much of the 2009 season with a broken wrist. Davin Meggett also returned alongside Scott to split touches as the number-one running back. Torrey Smith returned as the leading wide receiver and a strong team leader. The offensive line's loss of Costa was replaced with former walk-on Paul Pinegar. The defensive unit returned five starters, including returning tackle (131) leader linebacker Alex Wujciak, returning sack (6) leader Adrian Moten, and interception (4) leader Cameron Chism.

=== Recruiting ===
College recruiting
Name	Hometown	School	Height	Weight	40^{‡}	Commit date
Nathaniel Clarke; OL	Washington, DC	Archbishop Carroll	6 ft 4 in (1.93 m)	282 lb (128 kg)	5.0	Jul 28, 2009
Nathaniel Clarke; OL	Recruit ratings: Scout: Rivals: (N/A)					
Javarie Johnson; LB	Washington, DC	Dunbar	6 ft 4 in (1.93 m)	208 lb (94 kg)	4.5	Jan 11, 2010
Javarie Johnson; LB	Recruit ratings: Scout: Rivals: (79)					
David Mackall; DE	Baltimore, MD	Fork Union	6 ft 3 in (1.91 m)	240 lb (110 kg)	N/A	Sep 8, 2009
David Mackall; DE	Recruit ratings: Scout: Rivals: (75)					
Titus Till; DB	Upper Marlboro, MD	Wise	6 ft 3 in (1.91 m)	200 lb (91 kg)	4.6	Jan 24, 2009
Titus Till; DB	Recruit ratings: Scout: Rivals: (78)					
Tyler Smith; QB	Easton, PA	Wilson Area	6 ft 4 in (1.93 m)	195 lb (88 kg)	4.7	May 3, 2009
Tyler Smith; QB	Recruit ratings: Scout: Rivals: (80)					
Adrian Coxson; WR	Baltimore, MD	Baltimore City College	6 ft 1 in (1.85 m)	195 lb (88 kg)	4.5	Aug 20, 2010
Adrian Coxson; WR	Recruit ratings: Scout: Rivals: (81)					
Devin Burns; QB	Columbus, GA	Carver	6 ft 2 in (1.88 m)	172 lb (78 kg)	4.7	Aug 1, 2009
Devin Burns; QB	Recruit ratings: Scout: Rivals: (77)					
Tyrek Cheeseboro; WR	Baltimore, MD	Milford Mill	6 ft 0 in (1.83 m)	180 lb (82 kg)	4.5	Jul 19, 2009
Tyrek Cheeseboro; WR	Recruit ratings: Scout: Rivals: (75)					
Sal Conaboy; OL	Clarks Summit, PA	Abington	6 ft 5 in (1.96 m)	255 lb (116 kg)	N/A	Aug 27, 2009
Sal Conaboy; OL	Recruit ratings: Scout: Rivals: (78)					
Ian Evans; DE	Hammonton, NJ	Hammonton	6 ft 3 in (1.91 m)	230 lb (100 kg)	N/A	Apr 29, 2009
Ian Evans; DE	Recruit ratings: Scout: Rivals: (78)					
Max Garcia; OL	Norcross, GA	Norcross	6 ft 5 in (1.96 m)	280 lb (130 kg)	N/A	Dec 20, 2009
Max Garcia; OL	Recruit ratings: Scout: Rivals: (77)					
Lorne Goree; LB	Springdale, MD	Fork Union	6 ft 2 in (1.88 m)	210 lb (95 kg)	4.65	Jul 31, 2009
Lorne Goree; LB	Recruit ratings: Scout: Rivals: (75)					
Jeremiah Johnson; DB	Suitland, MD	Suitland	5 ft 11 in (1.80 m)	153 lb (69 kg)	4.5	Jun 30, 2009
Jeremiah Johnson; DB	Recruit ratings: Scout: Rivals: (74)					
Desmond Kearse; LB	Fort Myers, FL	Dunbar	6 ft 3 in (1.91 m)	185 lb (84 kg)	N/A	Jan 19, 2009
Desmond Kearse; LB	Recruit ratings: Scout: Rivals: (78)					
Darius Kilgo; DT	Matthews, NC	Weddington	6 ft 5 in (1.96 m)	311 lb (141 kg)	5.3	Nov 4, 2009
Darius Kilgo; DT	Recruit ratings: Scout: Rivals: (74)					
Rahsaan Moore; DE	Upper Marlboro, Maryland	Wise	6 ft 2 in (1.88 m)	230 lb (100 kg)	4.6	Nov 2, 2009
Rahsaan Moore; DE	Recruit ratings: Scout: Rivals: (75)					
Clarence Murphy; DE	Hollywood, FL	Hollywood Hills	6 ft 2 in (1.88 m)	230 lb (100 kg)	N/A	Jan 9, 2010
Clarence Murphy; DE	Recruit ratings: Scout: Rivals: (76)					
Matt Robinson; ATH	Columbia, MD	Atholton	6 ft 3 in (1.91 m)	195 lb (88 kg)	4.6	Jun 30, 2009
Matt Robinson; ATH	Recruit ratings: Scout: Rivals: (75)					
Mario Rowson; DB	Norfolk, VA	Lake Taylor	6 ft 3 in (1.91 m)	185 lb (84 kg)	4.4	Jul 24, 2009
Mario Rowson; DB	Recruit ratings: Scout: Rivals: (73)					
Jeremiah Wilson; ATH	Winchester, VA	John Handley	5 ft 10 in (1.78 m)	180 lb (82 kg)	4.5	Feb 22, 2009
Jeremiah Wilson; ATH	Recruit ratings: Scout: Rivals: (76)					
Andre Monroe; DT	Washington, DC	St. John's College	6 ft 0 in (1.83 m)	287 lb (130 kg)	4.8	Jun 30, 2009
Andre Monroe; DT	Recruit ratings: Scout: Rivals: (77)					
Jacob Wheeler; OL	Plantation, FL	American Heritage	6 ft 6 in (1.98 m)	260 lb (120 kg)	N/A	Dec 24, 2009
Jacob Wheeler; OL	Recruit ratings: Scout: Rivals: (N/A)					
Overall recruit ranking: Scout: 42 Rivals: 36
‡ Refers to 40-yard dash; Note: In many cases, Scout, Rivals, 247Sports, On3, and ESPN may conflict in their listings of height, weight and 40 time.; In these cases, the average was taken. ESPN grades are on a 100-point scale.; Sources: "2010 Maryland Commitment List". Rivals.; "Scout.com Football Recruiting: Maryland". Scout.; "RecruitTracker 2008: Maryland". ESPN.; "Scout.com Team Recruiting Rankings". Scout.; "2010 Team Ranking". Rivals.com.

== Personnel ==
=== Depth chart ===
Information as of September 13, 2010
OFFENSE X-receiver: 7 Adrian Cannon – Sr-3V; 12 Kevin Dorsey – So-1V; 85 Tony Logan – Jr-2V; Left tackle: 75 Justin Gilbert – So-1V; 74 Nick Klemm – Fr-RS; Left guard: 77 Andrew Gonnella – Jr-1V; 67 Pete White – Fr-RS; 73 Max Garcia – Fr-HS; Center: 71 Paul Pinegar – Sr-3V; 51 John Dillon – So-SQ; 60 Chris Rhodes – Jr-SQ; Right guard: 78 Justin Lewis – So-1V; 63 Bennett Fulper – So-1V; 68 Josh Cary – Fr-RS; 61 Reginal Ricks – So-1V; Right tackle: 76 R.J. Dill – So-1V; 79 Pete DeSouza – Fr-RS; 54 Cody Blue – Fr-RS; Tight end-Y: 89 Matt Furstenburg – So-1V; 81 Ryan Schlothauer – So-SQ; (injured) 80 Lansford Watson – Jr-2V; (injured) 88 Will Yeatman – Sr-TR; (injured) 34 Devonte Campbell – So-1V; Quarterback: 11 Jamarr Robinson – Jr-1V; 5 Danny O'Brien – Fr-RS; 14 Devin Burns – Fr-HS; (injured) 16 C.J. Brown – Fr-RS; Tailback: 23 Da'Rel Scott – Sr-3V; 8 Davin Meggett – Jr-2V; 20 Gary Douglas – So-1V; 10 D.J. Adams – Fr-RS; Fullback: 30 Haroon Brown – Jr-2V; 49 Louis Berman – Jr-SQ; 47 Paul Lariviere – Jr-SQ; (injured) 36 Taylor Watson – Jr-2V; Z-receiver: 82 Torrey Smith – Jr-2V; 17 Quintin McCree – Jr-2V; 83 Emani Lee-Odai – Sr-3V; F-receiver: 3 LaQuan Williams – Sr-2V; 4 Ronnie Tyler – Jr-2V; Tight end-F: 86 Dave Stinebaugh – Fr-RS; 89 Matt Furstenburg – So-SQ	DEFENSE Defensive end: 15 Drew Gloster – Sr-2V; 44 Derek Drummond – Jr-2V; 58 Bradley Johnson – Fr-RS; (injured) 91 De'Onte Arnett – Fr-RS; (injured) 41 Marcus Whitfield – Fr-RS; Nose tackle: 96 A.J. Francis – So-1V; 90 Maurice Hampton – Jr-1V; 50 Ian Davidson – Jr-1V; Defensive tackle: 72 Joe Vellano – So-1V; 69 Zachariah Kerr – So-1V; Anchor: 95 Justin Anderson – So-1V; 56 Isaiah Ross – So-1V; 99 Carl Russell – So-1V; SAM linebacker: 1 Adrian Moten – Sr-3V; 52 Darin Drakeford – So-1V; 45 Nick Peterson – Jr-SQ; MIKE linebacker: 33 Alex Wujciak – So-SQ; 59 David Mackall – Fr-HS; WILL linebacker: 9 Demetrius Hartsfield – So-1V; 51 Ryan Donohue – So-1V; 53 Lorne Goree – Fr-HS; (injured) 42 Ben Pooler – Jr-1V; Cornerback: 21 Trenton Hughes – Jr-1V; 25 Dexter McDougle – Fr-RS; 38 Jeremiah Johnson – Fr-HS; Free safety: 6 Kenny Tate – Jr-2V; 48 Eric Franklin – So-1V; 27 Titus Till – Fr-HS; Strong safety: 2 Antwine Perez – Sr-2V; 19 Travis Hawkins – Fr-RS; 40 Matt Robinson – Fr-HS; Cornerback: 22 Cameron Chism – Jr-2V; 24 Avery Graham – Fr-RS; 26 Michael Carter – Sr-1V	SPECIAL TEAMS Placekicker: 35 Travis Baltz – Sr-3V; 37 Ted Townsley – Sr-1V; (injured) 43 Nick Ferrara – So-1V; Kickoff specialist: 37 Ted Townsley – Sr-1V; 35 Travis Baltz – Sr-3V; Punter: 35 Travis Baltz – Sr-3V; 37 Ted Townsley – Sr-1V; Punt returner: 85 Tony Logan – Jr-2V; 25 Dexter McDougle – Fr-RS; Kick returner: 82 Torrey Smith – Jr-2V; 21 Trenton Hughes – Jr-1V; Holder: 35 Travis Baltz – Sr-3V; 37 Ted Townsley – Sr-1V; Long snapper: 64 Tim Downs – Jr-1V
Fr: Freshman; So: Sophomore; Jr: Junior; Sr: Senior	V: Number of prior seasons varsity experience RS: Redshirt status prior season TR: Sat out prior season due to NCAA transfer rules SQ: Practice squad prior season HS: High school experience only

== Game summaries ==
=== Navy ===
Team	1	2	3	4	Total
Navy	0	7	7	0	14
• Maryland	14	0	0	3	17

- Date: September 6
- Location: M&T Bank Stadium • Baltimore, Maryland
- Game start: 4:00 p.m. EST
- TV announcers (ESPN): Mike Patrick, Craig James, Quint Kessenich

Scoring summary
1	10:28	MD	Da'Rel Scott 5-yard run (Travis Baltz kick)	Maryland 7–0
1	4:15	MD	Davin Meggett 3-yard run (Travis Baltz kick)	Maryland 14–0
2	14:25	NAVY	Andre Byrd 10-yard run (Joe Buckley kick)	Maryland 14–7
2	1:52	NAVY	Ricky Dobbs 1-yard run (Joe Buckley kick)	Tie 14–14
4	7:50	MD	Travis Baltz 24-yard field goal	Maryland 17–14

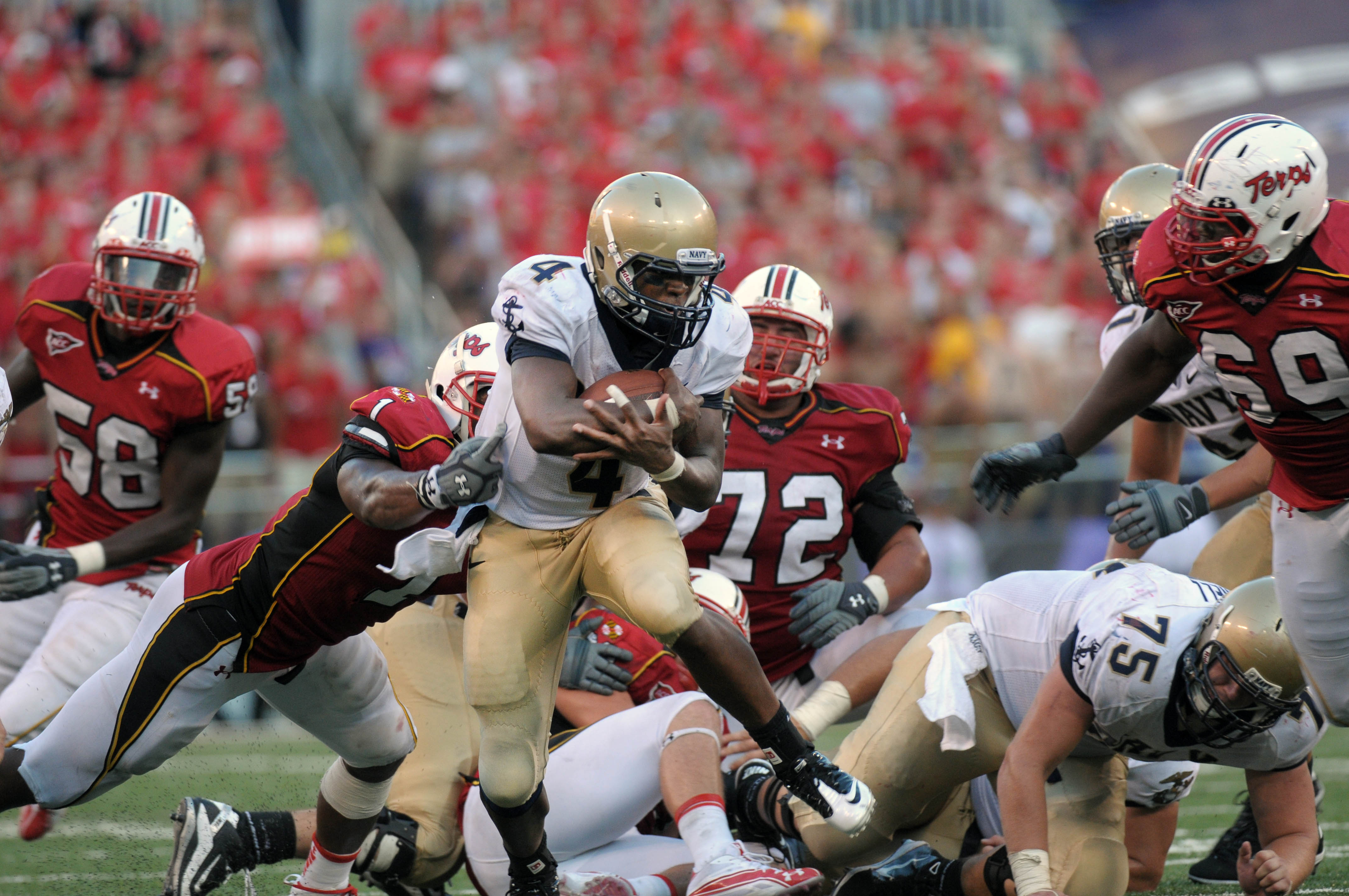
Navy quarterback Ricky Dobbs rushes against Maryland.

Maryland and Navy renewed their intrastate rivalry for their second meeting in 45 years at M&T Bank Stadium in Baltimore. The Terrapins took a 14–0 first quarter lead before the Midshipmen equalized in the second half. Maryland punter Travis Baltz made good a final period field goal, which proved the margin of victory after a goal-line stop by Kenny Tate halted a Navy drive in the closing minutes. Navy gained 412 rushing yards, but the Maryland defense allowed them to convert only two of seven scoring opportunities in the red zone.

=== Morgan State ===
In Maryland's home opener they faced Division I FCS Morgan State of Baltimore in their first ever meeting. Maryland routed Morgan State, 62–3. The Terrapins held their opponent to 85 yards of offense, the smallest number during Friedgen's tenure as head coach. It featured the most points scored by a Maryland team since the 1975 game against Virginia, and the second-largest margin in the Ralph Friedgen era (after the 61–0 shutout of The Citadel in 2003).

=== West Virginia ===
Maryland started the game against West Virginia with four crowd noise-induced penalties that pushed them back against their own end zone. The Mountaineers took a 28–0 lead in the third quarter, but the Terrapins responded with 17 unanswered points. The Maryland passing attack exploited the absence of West Virginia cornerback Brandon Hogan who had been suspended for a drunk driving charge. Quarterback Jamarr Robinson completed long touchdown passes of 60 and 80 yards to Torrey Smith, who dropped a third would-be score in the end zone. Offensive lineman Justin Gilbert suffered a knee injury, and the Maryland line surrendered eight sacks, including one which re-injured backup quarterback Danny O'Brien's ankle in his only snap of the game. It was the most allowed by the offensive line during Friedgen's tenure.

=== FIU ===
Redshirt freshman Danny O'Brien started as quarterback in place of Jamarr Robinson, who had a sore throwing arm from the West Virginia game. In the first three possessions, O'Brien managed only one first down, and Maryland fell behind, 7–0. The quarterback then connected with Torrey Smith for a 32-yard pass, which was advanced to the Florida International 9-yard line because of a ten-yard facemask penalty. On the next play, O'Brien floated a pass to LaQuan Williams in the back corner of the end zone, and the point after touchdown equalized the score. In the second quarter, Tony Logan returned a punt 85 yards for a touchdown, which put Maryland up 14–7 at halftime. It was the first time Maryland scored on a punt return since Steve Suter did so in the 2004 Gator Bowl. After Florida International equalized, Da'Rel Scott scored on a 56-yard rush with 2:46 left in the first half. In the third quarter, Florida International scored again before Maryland retook the lead with a 68-yard pass from O'Brien to Smith. Both teams scored once more, and with four minutes remaining in the game, Davin Meggett ran for a 76-yard touchdown. It was the first time Maryland had two 50-yard touchdown runs since Bruce Perry accomplished that feat in 2001.

=== Duke ===
In the ACC season opener, Maryland was outgained for the fourth time of the season yet again escaped with a victory. The Terrapins surrendered no turnovers while taking away two from Duke, on two interceptions by safety Antwine Perez and linebacker Adrian Moten. Maryland held Duke to field goals in its first three possessions, and fell behind 9–0. Davin Meggett scored on a 9-yard run to cap a Maryland drive shortly before half time. In the third quarter, Tony Logan returned a punt 85 yards which helped the Terrapins a 14–9 advantage. In the final period, Da'Rel Scott caught a short pass from Danny O'Brien and broke free for a 71-yard touchdown. Duke scored to cut the margin to 21–16, and drove to the Maryland 38-yard line. Antwine Perez broke up a pass from quarterback Sean Renfree, which gave Maryland possession on downs and allowed them to run out the clock.

=== East Carolina ===
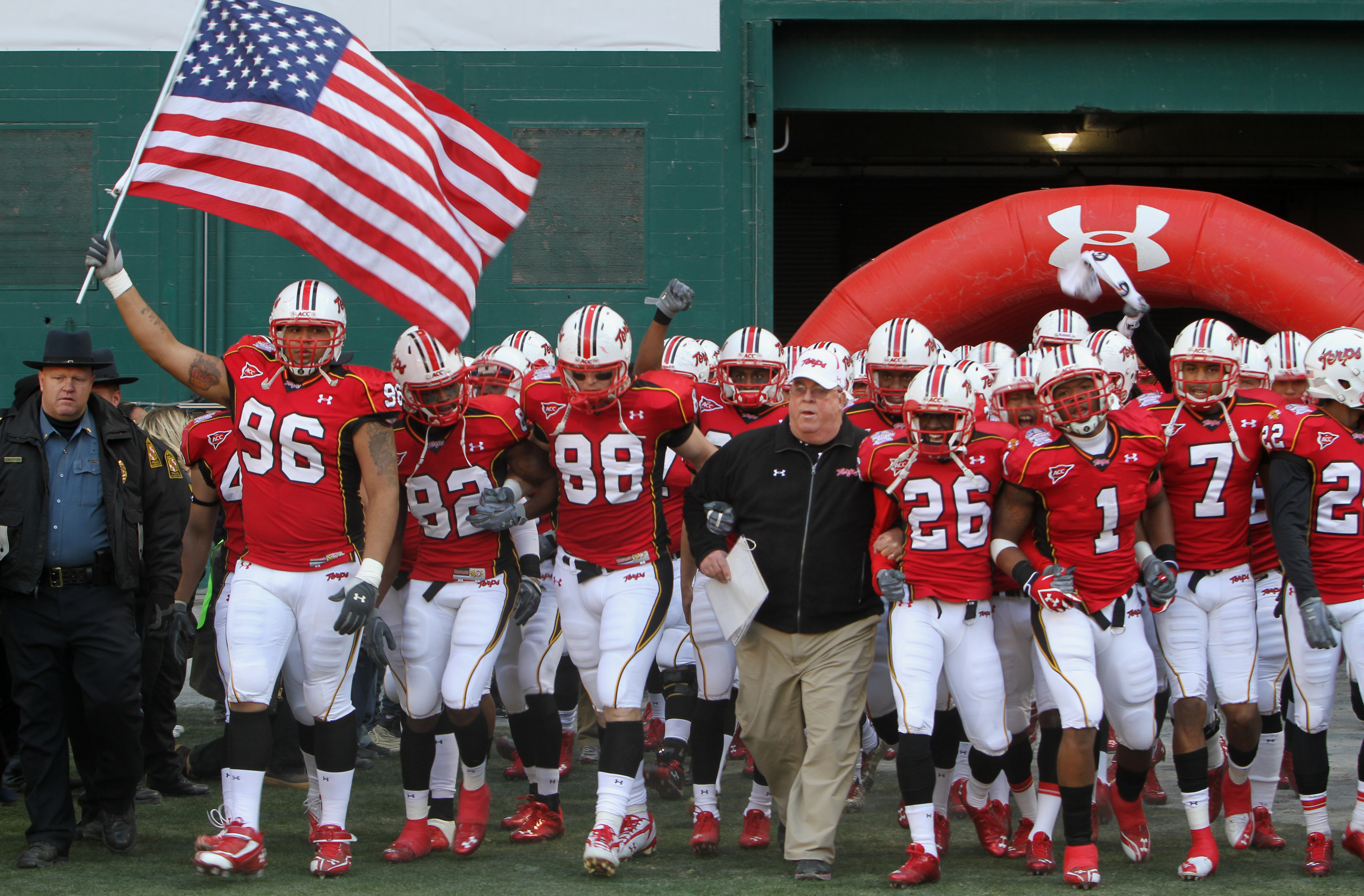
Ralph Friedgen and the Maryland Terrapins take the field in the 2010 Military Bowl

== Awards ==
- Ralph Friedgen, ACC Coach of the Year
- Danny O'Brien, QB, ACC Rookie of the Year, Freshman All-America team

=== All-conference ===
- Torrey Smith, WR, All-ACC first team
- Tony Logan, SP, All-ACC first team
- Kenny Tate, S, All-ACC first team
- Alex Wujciak, LB, All-ACC first team
- Joe Vellano, DT, All-ACC second team
- Paul Pinegar, OT, All-ACC honorable mention

=== Players of the week ===
- Danny O'Brien, QB, ACC Rookie of the Week, September 27, 2010
- Danny O'Brien, QB, ACC Rookie of the Week, October 25, 2010
- Danny O'Brien, QB, ACC Rookie of the Week, November 1, 2010
- Danny O'Brien, QB, ACC Rookie of the Week, November 15, 2010
- Danny O'Brien, QB, ACC Rookie of the Week, November 29, 2010
- Antwine Perez, DB, Jim Thorpe Defensive Back of the Week, October 27, 2010
- Antwine Perez, DB, ACC Defensive Back of the Week, October 25, 2010
- Antwine Perez, DB, ACC Defensive Back of the Week, November 29, 2010
- Torrey Smith, WR, ACC Offensive Back of the Week, November 29, 2010
- Kenny Tate, DB, FWAA Nagurski National Defensive Player of the Week, September 4, 2010
- Kenny Tate, DB, Jim Thorpe Defensive Back of the Week, September 9, 2010
- Kenny Tate, DB, ACC Defensive Back of the Week, September 4, 2010
- Joe Vellano, DT, ACC Defensive Lineman of the Week, September 4, 2010

=== Watch lists ===
- Travis Baltz, P/K, William V. Campbell Trophy semifinalist
- Adrian Moten, LB, Butkus Award Watch List
- Da'Rel Scott, RB, Doak Walker Award Watch List
- Da'Rel Scott, RB, Maxwell Award Watch List
- Torrey Smith, WR, Biletnikoff Award Watch List
- Torrey Smith, WR, Paul Hornung Award Watch List
- Kenny Tate, FS, Bronko Nagurski Trophy Watch List
- Alex Wujciak, LB, Bronko Nagurski Trophy Watch List
- Alex Wujciak, LB, Butkus Award Watch List
- Alex Wujciak, LB, Chuck Bednarik Award Watch List
- Alex Wujciak, LB, Lombardi Award Watch List
- Alex Wujciak, LB, Lott Trophy Watch List
- Torrey Smith, Preseason All-ACC team specialist
- Torrey Smith, Preseason All-ACC team wide receiver
- Alex Wujciak, Preseason All-ACC team linebacker
- Tony Logan, PR, Phil Steele's Midseason All-ACC first team
- Adrian Moten, LB, Phil Steele's Midseason All-ACC second team
- Torrey Smith, WR, Phil Steele's Midseason All-ACC first team
- Kenny Tate, S, Phil Steele's Midseason All-ACC second team
- Joe Vellano, DT, Phil Steele's Midseason All-ACC first team
- Alex Wujciak, LB, Phil Steele's Midseason All-ACC first team
