= Danny O'Brien (gridiron football) =

American gridiron football player and coach (born 1990)

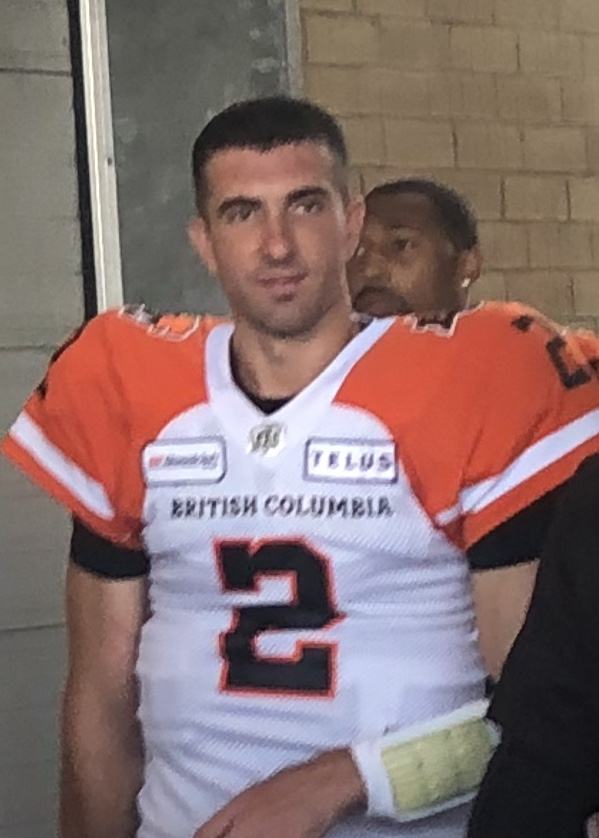
- O'Brien before a BC Lions game in 2019

Virginia Tech Hokies
- Title: Quarterbacks coach

Personal information
- Born: September 26, 1990 (age 36); Minneapolis, Minnesota, U.S.
- Listed height: 6 ft 3 in (1.91 m)
- Listed weight: 220 lb (100 kg)

Career information
- High school: Kernersville (NC) East Forsyth
- College: Catawba; Wisconsin; Maryland
- NFL draft: 2014: undrafted

Career history

Playing
- Columbus Lions (2014)*; Ottawa Redblacks (2014–2016); Edmonton Eskimos (2017–2018); BC Lions (2019)
- * Offseason or practice squad member only

Coaching
- BC Lions (2020) Offensive assistant; Penn State (2021–2022) Offensive analyst; Penn State (2023) Graduate assistant; Penn State (2024–2025) Quarterbacks coach; Virginia Tech (2026–present) Quarterbacks coach

Awards and highlights
- Grey Cup champion (2016); ACC Rookie of the Year (2010); ACC Offensive Rookie of the Year (2010); Freshman All-American (FWAA) (2010)

Career CFL statistics
- Passing completions: 100
- Passing attempts: 175
- Passing yards: 1045
- TD–INT: 3–10
- Stats at CFL.ca

Daniel Matthew O'Brien (born September 26, 1990) is an American football coach and former quarterback. He is currently the Quarterbacks Coach for the Virginia Tech Hokies. As a professional, he was a member of the Columbus Lions, Ottawa Redblacks, Edmonton Eskimos, and BC Lions. He played college football for the University of Maryland, University of Wisconsin and Catawba College.

== Early life ==
O'Brien was born in Minneapolis, Minnesota, and at the age of 12, moved to Kernersville, North Carolina, where he attended East Forsyth High School. During his interscholastic career, he played basketball and football as a quarterback. As a junior in 2007, he completed 151 of 248 pass attempts for 1,905 yards and 15 touchdowns and rushed for 290 yards and seven touchdowns. As a senior, he completed 117 of 235 pass attempts for 1,640 yards and 16 touchdowns and six interceptions and had 160 rushing attempts for 780 yards and 11 touchdowns. That season, he led his team to the Metro 4A conference championship and the third round of the state playoffs.

Rivals.com rated him a three-star college prospect and ranked him the 36th best quarterback in the nation and 35th best player in the state of North Carolina. Scout.com also rated him a three-star prospect. Miami, North Carolina, North Carolina State, Notre Dame, Wake Forest, and Virginia Tech showed interest in O'Brien, and Duke, East Carolina, and Maryland offered him an athletic scholarship.

== College career ==
=== Maryland ===
O'Brien enrolled at the University of Maryland in the fall of 2009 but was redshirted and did not see playing time that year. O'Brien entered the 2010 season as the backup quarterback behind Jamarr Robinson. He saw his first action in the season opener against Navy, losing a fumble on his only play of the game. In the second game of the season, O'Brien saw his first serious action against Morgan State. Up 24–0 in the second quarter, O'Brien capitalized by throwing 3 touchdowns in his first four passes before giving way to third string Quarterback, C.J. Brown in the 62–3 win. Against West Virginia, O'Brien again only saw one play of action, getting sacked for a five-yard loss. Robinson's sore arm moved O'Brien into the starting role against Florida International. In the first start of his college career, O'Brien passed for 250 yards and two touchdowns with no interceptions. O'Brien shattered all significant Freshman quarterback records at the University of Maryland, passing for 2,438 yards and 22 touchdowns. In addition, he rushed for a twelve-yard touchdown against Virginia and collected a four-yard touchdown reception against Clemson. During the 2010 season, the Atlantic Coast Conference named O'Brien the ACC Rookie of the Week a total of five times. Upon the conclusion of the season, he was named the ACC Rookie of the Year. O'Brien was the first Maryland player to ever receive the honor. The Football Writers Association of America named O'Brien to its Freshman All-America team.

=== Wisconsin ===
On February 13, 2012, O'Brien announced he would be transferring from the University of Maryland. O'Brien announced on March 28 that he would transfer to the University of Wisconsin, and on August 20 he was named the starter for Wisconsin's season opener against the Northern Iowa Panthers. On September 20, Wisconsin head coach Bret Bielema replaced O'Brien with redshirt freshman Joel Stave, citing problems with turnovers. After Stave suffered a season-ending injury during the October 27 game against the Michigan State Spartans, O'Brien remained the backup behind fifth-year senior Curt Phillips.

=== Catawba College ===
On June 10, 2013, it was announced that O'Brien would not be returning to Wisconsin and would instead seek another school for his remaining year of eligibility. It was later announced that O'Brien transferred to Catawba College. During his 2013 season with Catawba, O'Brien started ten games while passing for 2,490 yards with 15 touchdowns and six interceptions. The team finished with a 6–5 record. O'Brien also played in the 2014 Medal of Honor Bowl, a postseason all-star game, passing for 87 yards (5-for-11) and rushing for a touchdown.

=== Statistics ===
			Passing									Rushing
Season	Team	GP	Comp	Att	%	Yds	Avg	TDs	Long	Int	Rating	Att	Yards	Avg	Long	TDs
2010	Maryland	13	192	337	57.0	2,438	7.2	22	71	8	134.5	31	-48	-1.6	12	1
2011	Maryland	9	150	266	56.4	1,648	6.2	7	69	10	109.6	33	57	1.7	30	2
2012	Wisconsin	7	52	86	60.5	523	6.1	3	53	1	120.7	15	-82	-5.5	7	0
2013	Catawba	10	248	365	67.9	2,490	6.8	15	50	6	135.5	70	35	0.5	15	3
Career
	Career	39	642	1,054	60.9	7,099	6.7	47	71	25	127.5	149	-38	-0.3	30	6

== Professional career ==
After being undrafted in 2014, he was offered a tryout at rookie minicamp with the Atlanta Falcons. However, O'Brien was not signed.

=== Columbus Lions ===
On May 27, 2014, O'Brien signed with the Columbus Lions of the Professional Indoor Football League (PIFL).

=== Ottawa Redblacks ===
On the day before his first game for the Lions, O'Brien signed with the Ottawa Redblacks of the CFL on May 31, 2014. O'Brien was placed on the exempt list for the PIFL, and began the season as the third QB on the Redblacks depth chart. A season-ending injury to second-string quarterback Thomas DeMarco allowed O'Brien to see action during the 2014 CFL season. Danny O'Brien played in eight games in his first season in the CFL, receiving significant playing time in two of those games. He would finish the season completing 29 of 54 passing attempts for 421 yards, with 2 touchdowns and 5 interceptions (53.1 passer rating).

=== Edmonton Eskimos ===
After winning the Grey Cup with the Redblacks in 2016, O'Brien signed with Edmonton Eskimos for the 2017 CFL season, reuniting him with former offensive coordinator and Edmonton Head Coach Jason Maas, and replacing the retired Jordan Lynch as the third quarterback, as well as holder for convert kicks and field goals. On August 11, 2018, O'Brien completed his first pass in nearly two years, on a fake field goal to defensive tackle Almondo Sewell. By the season's end he had completed four out of five passes for 44 yards; his one incompletion was an intercepted Hail Mary pass in at the end of a game. After going 15 of 26 for 93 yards in two preseason games to begin the 2019 season, and failing to produce a scoring drive, Logan Kilgore won the backup job and O'Brien was released. When asked about O'Brien's release, Edmonton kicker, Sean Whyte simply replied, "It sucks". O'Brien was the final member of the previous season's quarterback room to leave the team in 2019.

=== BC Lions ===
Following the preseason, O'Brien was reunited with Mike Reilly as his backup when he signed with the BC Lions. After Reilly suffered a season ending injury near the end of the regular season O'Brien made his starting debut for the Lions in Week 19 in a losing effort against the Saskatchewan Roughriders. In the game O'Brien completed 16 of 25 pass attempts for 171 yards with one touchdown and one interception. He retired during the following off-season.

== Coaching Career ==
=== BC Lions ===
In 2020, O'Brien served as the running backs coach for the BC Lions in the Canadian Football League.

=== Penn State University ===
Danny O'Brien joined the Penn State football staff in 2021 as an offensive analyst, after having played quarterback at Maryland during James Franklin's tenure as quarterbacks coach there. He served three seasons as an offensive analyst and offensive graduate assistant before being promoted to quarterbacks coach in 2024. During his time at Penn State, O'Brien worked with quarterbacks Sean Clifford and Drew Allar. Clifford concluded his career as the program's all-time leader in wins by a starting quarterback, completions, passing touchdowns, passing yards, and total yards, and was later selected in the fifth round of the NFL Draft. O'Brien also coached Allar during his first season as a starter in 2023, when Allar earned honorable mention All-Big Ten recognition and set a Penn State single-season record for lowest interception percentage. In the 2024 season, Allar finished among the Big Ten leaders in passing yards, passing efficiency, and quarterback rating.

=== Virginia Tech ===
In December 2025, O'Brien was reported to have been hired by Virginia Tech as quarterbacks coach under head coach James Franklin, following five seasons on Franklin's staff at Penn State.
