= Kenny Tate =

American gridiron football player (born 1990)

No. 6, 18
- Position: Defensive end

Personal information
- Born: May 15, 1990 (age 36); Forestville, Maryland, U.S.
- Listed height: 6 ft 4 in (1.93 m)
- Listed weight: 220 lb (100 kg)

Career information
- College: Maryland
- NFL draft: 2013: undrafted

Career history
- Winnipeg Blue Bombers (2014)*
- * Offseason or practice squad member only

Awards and highlights
- First-team All-ACC (2010); ACC Defensive Back of the Week (September 4, 2010); 2008 Humanitarian Bowl; 2010 Military Bowl

Kenny Tate (born May 15, 1990) is a former professional gridiron football defensive end. He signed as undrafted free agent by the Winnipeg Blue Bombers in 2014. He played college football at the University of Maryland as a safety, wide receiver, defensive end, defensive tackle, and linebacker. He was a highly touted college prospect and considered one of the best interscholastic players in the nation.

== Early life ==
Tate grew up in Forestville, Maryland with parents Kenneth and Michelle Fields. He first played football at the age of six as a running back for the Peppermill Pirates and started playing basketball that same year. Tate attended DeMatha Catholic High School in Hyattsville, Maryland, where he played both sports. In football, he was a four-year letterman and a three-year starter. He played as a wide receiver, tailback, safety, kick returner, and punt returner. His high school coach compared his athleticism to that of Brian Westbrook. As a sophomore in 2005, he recorded seven rushing and four receiving touchdowns. As a junior, Tate rushed and received for more than 300 combined yards and seven touchdowns, and also recorded one kickoff return touchdown and two punt return touchdowns. As a senior, he recorded 32 receptions for 489 yards and six touchdowns, 48 tackles, and four interceptions. The Associated Press named him a consensus all-state player three times, and The Washington Post named him an All-Metro player three times. He played as a starting wide receiver for the East squad in the 2008 U.S. Army All-American Bowl, an all-star game for some of the nation's most outstanding high school seniors.

Rivals.com rated him a four-star prospect, the 23rd-ranked wide receiver in the nation, and fourth-ranked player in the state of Maryland. Scout.com also rated him a four-star prospect and considered him the 16th-ranked receiver nationally. ESPN placed him at number 134 in the ESPNU 150, which consisted of the best players in the nation from the 2008 recruiting class. SuperPrep assessed him as the third-ranked player in the Mid-Atlantic region. Tate was featured as one of Sports Illustrated’s “Faces in the Crowd” March 17, 2008. Tate was a highly recruited college prospect and received more than 100 scholarship offers. He was a potential recruit in both football and in basketball as a small forward, but decided before his senior year that he would play the former in college. Tate received football scholarship offers from Florida, Illinois, Maryland, Michigan, Notre Dame, Ohio State, Penn State, Tennessee, Virginia, and Virginia Tech. He narrowed his final choices to Illinois, Maryland, and Penn State. Ultimately, Tate chose Maryland over Illinois, whose offensive coordinator Mike Locksley, a former Terrapins running backs coach, had much success recruiting in the Baltimore–Washington area. Tate said, "I felt it was the best fit for football and academics." He told The Baltimore Sun, "One [reason] of course is that it’s close to home. Parents, family members and friends can come see me play. The football program is on the rise, academics are one of the best, so I can’t go wrong there." His commitment to Maryland was seen as a windfall for the program, which had recently struggled to secure highly touted prospects from the local area. After his freshman season, he said, "I don't think a lot of the players around here think about playing at Maryland . . . I love it here and it's close to home. I don't regret my decision at all."

== College career ==
=== 2008 season ===
Before the start of the 2008 season, head coach Ralph Friedgen moved Tate to safety due to a lack of depth at that position. Friedgen admitted apprehension with the decision because he had recruited Tate as a wide receiver and did not want to hurt his credibility as a recruiter. The switch moved him from a position with an abundance of talented players to one that allowed significantly more game action. As a converted wide receiver, he possessed sure hands, a valuable attribute for a defensive back. Friedgen said,

"He is really a phenomenal athlete and he really has tremendous hands. He made some plays the other day that were like, 'Whoa,' going up and catching the ball with one hand. He is a pretty good man-cover guy for a guy who is 6-3, 220 pounds. He plays on the slots, and Coach [James] Franklin can’t find the slots because he covers them up so well."

One of four true freshman to play for Maryland in 2008, Tate saw action in all 13 games as a reserve safety and on special teams. He recorded six kick returns for 84 yards and a long of 17, 15 tackles including ten solo and five assisted, one interception, and one pass broken-up. Tate served as the backup kick returner behind Torrey Smith and punt returner behind Danny Oquendo. Wide receiver Oquendo said of Tate, "He's a great guy and he's a freak athlete. But he’s not cocky."

Tate had one assisted tackle each against Delaware and Middle Tennessee, and two solo tackles against California. Against Eastern Michigan, he saw action every third series in relief of starting safety Jeff Allen. Tate was also employed as a second, close-in returner with the goal of intercepting one of Eastern Michigan's "rugby-style" punts before it could bounce downfield. In that game, he recorded a career-high three tackles. Tate compiled one solo tackle against Clemson and two against Virginia. In the shutout win against Wake Forest, Tate recorded his first broken-up pass, but was unable to pull it in for an interception. He also had two solo tackles in that game. Tate returned two kickoffs for 20 yards in the Florida State game, and against Boston College, he recorded one tackle. In the 2008 Humanitarian Bowl against Nevada, Tate made his first career interception when he caught a potential touchdown throw from Colin Kaepernick in the end zone.

=== 2009 season ===
At the end of the 2008 season, head coach Ralph Friedgen gave Tate the option of switching back to wide receiver. Friedgen said, "I think he's going to be really good whether he goes back to wide receiver or stays at safety." In 2009, Tate chose to remain at safety and said, "I feel a lot more comfortable [than early last year]. I feel like I'm back in the swing of things." Despite ten potential starting wide receivers on the Maryland roster, Tate said that did not factor into his decision to remain on defense. He said that he had only played as a receiver for three years in high school, while he had been playing defensive positions his entire life.

He entered the 2009 season as the backup to senior strong safety Jamari McCollough and backup punt returner to Tony Logan. Safeties coach Kevin Lempa and defensive coordinator Don Brown said Tate would see a significant amount of playing time at various positions: safety, linebacker, defensive end, and cornerback. Tate received high praise during and after the summer, and The Baltimore Sun called him one of the "August standouts", alongside wide receiver Adrian Cannon. Head coach Friedgen called his camp performance "sensational", while Maryland quarterback Chris Turner said, "Kenny is a problem. His instincts are so advanced, the way he times up the count when he is blitzing and plays in coverage and reads receivers and reads me and the space he covers just with his wingspan alone, it is really impressive to see. It's something else."

During the season, Tate saw action in ten games, including four starts. He missed the final two contests against Florida State and Boston College after he suffered a severe ankle sprain against Virginia Tech. Tate amassed 47 tackles and 1.5 sacks. He made his career first unassisted sack against Clemson quarterback Kyle Parker. After the season, he said, "It's a privilege to play . . . Just getting hurt last year, I had not missed a game since I was in like eighth grade. That hurt me, to miss those last two games and to not practice. It hurt me inside. I was just like, when I get my opportunity, every play, every down, I'm just going to go hard."

=== 2010 season ===
Before the season, The Washington Post considered him a "valuable asset" to second-year defensive coordinator Don Brown's aggressive system. In the season opener against Navy at M&T Bank Stadium in Baltimore, Tate stopped a quarterback keeper by Ricky Dobbs on the goal line, which preserved a 17–14 Maryland victory in the closing minutes. During the game, he compiled a career-high 12 tackles and forced two fumbles, one of which halted a potential scoring drive inside the Maryland five-yard line. For his performance against Navy, the Atlantic Coast Conference named Tate its Defensive Back of the Week. The Football Writers Association of America named him the Nagurski National Defensive Player of the Week and added him to the 2010 Bronko Nagurski Trophy Watch List. Against 21st-ranked West Virginia, Tate intercepted a pass thrown by Jock Sanders on a halfback option play, and returned it 53 yards. Against Duke, Tate harassed quarterback Sean Renfree and compiled 1.5 sacks, including one that forced a fumble during a drive deep in Maryland territory.

== Professional career ==
Tate went unselected in 2013 NFL draft and did not sign with any team during the 2013 season. On January 15, 2014, Tate signed with the Winnipeg Blue Bombers. It was announced that the Bombers were having Tate play the defensive end position. He was released on June 17, 2014.

== Personal life ==
Tate is studying business at the University of Maryland. His pre-game routine consists of eating two jelly sandwiches, a habit that he formed in the eighth grade. During his freshman season, Tate roomed with two other players who saw action in their first year: cornerback Cameron Chism and running back Davin Meggett.
