= 2010 Georgia Tech Yellow Jackets football team =

American college football season

2010 Georgia Tech Yellow Jackets football

Independence Bowl vs. Air Force, L 7–14
- Conference: Atlantic Coast Conference
- Coastal
- Record: 6–7 (4–4 ACC)
- Head coach: Paul Johnson (3rd season)
- Offensive scheme: Flexbone triple option
- Defensive coordinator: Al Groh (1st season)
- Base defense: 3–4
- Home stadium: Bobby Dodd Stadium (Capacity: 55,000)

2010 Atlantic Coast Conference football standings
| | Conf. | | | Overall |
| Team | W | | L | W | | L |
|---|---|---|---|---|---|---|
Atlantic Division
| No. 17 Florida State x | 6 | – | 2 | 10 | – | 4 |
| No. 23 Maryland | 5 | – | 3 | 9 | – | 4 |
| No. 25 NC State | 5 | – | 3 | 9 | – | 4 |
| Boston College | 4 | – | 4 | 7 | – | 6 |
| Clemson | 4 | – | 4 | 6 | – | 7 |
| Wake Forest | 1 | – | 7 | 3 | – | 9 |
Coastal Division
| No. 16 Virginia Tech x$ | 8 | – | 0 | 11 | – | 3 |
| Miami (FL) | 5 | – | 3 | 7 | – | 6 |
| Georgia Tech | 4 | – | 4 | 6 | – | 7 |
| North Carolina | 4 | – | 4 | 8 | – | 5 |
| Duke | 1 | – | 7 | 3 | – | 9 |
| Virginia | 1 | – | 7 | 4 | – | 8 |
Championship: Virginia Tech 44, Florida State 33
$ – BCS representative as conference champion; x – Division champion/co-champions; Rankings from AP Poll

The 2010 Georgia Tech Yellow Jackets football team represented the Georgia Institute of Technology in the 2010 NCAA Division I FBS football season. The Yellow Jackets were led by 3rd year head coach Paul Johnson and played their home games at Bobby Dodd Stadium. They are members of the Atlantic Coast Conference in the Coastal Division. They finished the season 6–7, 4–4 in ACC play. They were invited to the Independence Bowl where they were defeated by Air Force 7–14.

== Schedule ==
| Date | Time | Opponent | Rank | Site | TV | Result | Attendance | Source |
|---|---|---|---|---|---|---|---|---|
| September 4 | 1:00 pm | No. 11 (FCS) South Carolina State* | No. 16 | Bobby Dodd Stadium; Atlanta, GA | ESPN3 | W 41–10 | 51,668 | |
| September 11 | 12:00 pm | at Kansas* | No. 15 | Memorial Stadium; Lawrence, KS | FSN | L 25–28 | 46,907 | |
| September 18 | 12:00 pm | at North Carolina | | Kenan Memorial Stadium; Chapel Hill, NC | ACCN | W 30–24 | 58,500 | |
| September 25 | 12:00 pm | NC State | | Bobby Dodd Stadium; Atlanta, GA | ESPN | L 28–45 | 48,825 | |
| October 2 | 7:00 pm | at Wake Forest | | BB&T Field; Winston-Salem, NC | ESPNU | W 24–20 | 30,263 | |
| October 9 | 3:30 pm | Virginia^{†} | | Bobby Dodd Stadium; Atlanta, GA | ESPNU | W 33–21 | 48,016 | |
| October 16 | 3:30 pm | Middle Tennessee* | | Bobby Dodd Stadium; Atlanta, GA | ESPN3 | W 42–14 | 40,652 | |
| October 23 | 3:30 pm | at Clemson | | Memorial Stadium; Clemson, SC | ABC, ESPN | L 13–27 | 78,522 | |
| November 4 | 7:30 pm | at No. 20 Virginia Tech | | Lane Stadium; Blacksburg, VA (rivalry) | ESPN | L 21–28 | 66,233 | |
| November 13 | 12:00 pm | Miami (FL) | | Bobby Dodd Stadium; Atlanta, GA | ACCN | L 10–35 | 47,425 | |
| November 20 | 1:30 pm | Duke | | Bobby Dodd Stadium; Atlanta, GA | ESPN3 | W 30–20 | 42,110 | |
| November 27 | 7:45 pm | at Georgia* | | Sanford Stadium; Athens, GA (Clean, Old-Fashioned Hate) | ESPN | L 34–42 | 92,746 | |
| December 27 | 5:00 pm | vs. Air Force* | | Independence Stadium; Shreveport, LA (Independence Bowl) | ESPN2 | L 7–14 | 39,362 | |
*Non-conference game; ^{†}Homecoming; Rankings from AP Poll released prior to the game; All times are in Eastern time

== Rankings ==
Ranking movements Legend: ██ Increase in ranking ██ Decrease in ranking — = Not ranked RV = Received votes
| | Week | | | | | | | | | | | | | | | |
| Poll | Pre | 1 | 2 | 3 | 4 | 5 | 6 | 7 | 8 | 9 | 10 | 11 | 12 | 13 | 14 | Final |
|---|---|---|---|---|---|---|---|---|---|---|---|---|---|---|---|---|
| AP | 16 | 15 | RV | RV | — | — | — | RV | — | — | — | — | — | — | — | — |
| Coaches | 17 | 17 | RV | RV | — | — | — | RV | — | — | — | — | — | — | — | — |
| Harris | Not released | | | | | | RV | RV | RV | — | — | — | — | — | — | Not released |
| BCS | Not released | | | | | | | — | — | — | — | — | — | — | — | Not released |

== Regular season ==
=== South Carolina State ===
| Team | 1 | 2 | 3 | 4 | Total |
|---|---|---|---|---|---|
| South Carolina State | 3 | 0 | 7 | 0 | 10 |
| • #16 Georgia Tech | 7 | 13 | 14 | 7 | 41 |

- Date: September 4, 2010
- Location: Bobby Dodd Stadium
  Atlanta, GA
- Game start: 1:00 p.m.
- Game attendance: 51,668
- TV announcers (ESPN3): Trey Bender, Jay Taylor

The Georgia Tech Yellow Jackets opened their season with a victory against the Bulldogs of South Carolina State, 41–10. This match up pitted two defending conference champions against each other. The Jackets winning the ACC championship with a record of 11–3 and the Bulldogs the Mid-Eastern Athletic Conference championship in the FCS with a record of 10–2. The Jackets opened the scoring 35-yard run by quarterback Joshua Nesbitt. Nesbitt became the focus of the offense that lost the leading receiver, Demaryius Thomas, and leading rusher, Jonathan Dwyer, from last year's team. He finished the day with 130 yards and three rushing touchdowns. Rounding out the scoring were B-back Roddy Jones with two touchdown runs and backup quarterback Tevin Washington with one touchdown run. Tech's option offense worked well gaining 384 total yards, 372 of those coming on the ground.

South Carolina State's offense although not scoring a lot was able to move the ball on the new Al Groh 3–4 Defensive scheme. The Bulldogs were led by Asheton Jordan who ran for 125 yards on 17 carries and set up the Bulldogs' only touchdown with a 55-yard run to the Georgia Tech 3 in the third quarter. Quarterback Malcolm Long then scored from a yard out. Long was 11–25 passing for 94 yards. On the day SCSU amassed total 272 yards. The other score came when a 17-play drive stalled at the Georgia Tech 5-yard line and Blake Erickson converted a 28-yard field goal.

=== Kansas ===
| Team | 1 | 2 | 3 | 4 | Total |
|---|---|---|---|---|---|
| #15 Georgia Tech | 7 | 10 | 0 | 8 | 25 |
| • Kansas | 7 | 7 | 7 | 7 | 28 |

- Date: September 11, 2010
- Location: Memorial Stadium
  Lawrence, KS
- Game start: 12:00 p.m.
- Game attendance: 46,907
- TV announcers (FSN): Bill Land, Dave Lapham, Emily Jones

After a disappointing loss the previous week to North Dakota State, the Jayhawks of Kansas tried to spark a change by starting freshman QB Jordan Webb. On the first drive Webb was able to move the ball by completing several short passes. The drive stalled after a sack by Isaiah Johnson. The Jackets marched down the field and Nesbitt scored on a ten-yard run.

The Jayhawks took advantage of a kickoff out of bounds scoring after a couple of runs and a handful of passes. Evening the score 7–7. Kansas then scored on a play action pass taking a 14–7 lead. The Jackets added another score on a Nesbitt run and a field goal before the half. Taking the lead 14–17. After the half Kansas added a rushing touchdown and a passing touchdown giving them a 28–17 lead.

When the Yellow Jacket defense stopped Kansas and forced the Jayhawks to punt. The Jackets got the ball in good field position because of a fair catch interference penalty. A passer interference penalty moved GT to the brink of field goal range. But a false start penalty on a fourth down with three yards to go left the jackets in a passing situation and just out of comfortable field goal range. The subsequent slant route was on target yet Stephen Hill was unable to hold on to make the completion.

Georgia Tech rushed for 356 yards and racked up 407 yards of offense, but the defense could not stop Kansas' newly arraigned QB and the Jayhawk offense. Josh Nesbitt and Stephen Hill connected on a 52-yard touchdown midway through the fourth quarter, followed by a two-point conversion which put the game at 28–25. On the day Kansas had a total of 320 yards, 179 in the air and 141 on the ground. James Sims another freshmen getting his first start led the Jayhawks in rushing with 101 yards on 17 carries. Anthony Allen led the Jackets in with 89 yards on 11 carries.

=== North Carolina ===
| Team | 1 | 2 | 3 | 4 | Total |
|---|---|---|---|---|---|
| • Georgia Tech | 14 | 3 | 7 | 6 | 30 |
| North Carolina | 10 | 7 | 7 | 0 | 24 |

- Date: September 18, 2010
- Location: Kenan Memorial Stadium
  Chapel Hill, NC
- Game start: 12:00 p.m.
- Game attendance: 58,500
- TV announcers (ACC Network): Steve Martin, Dave Archer, Mike Hogewood

After receiving the opening kickoff the Tar Heels moved the ball down the field. Completing several passes and countering with quick runs. With senior running back Johnny White finding holes and running hard. A defense that didn't show much resistance during the drive stiffened inside of 10 yards to hold UNC to a field goal.

After the ensuing kick off it only took two plays with a modest game before Orwin Smith was able to take a pitch the length of the field for the touchdown. Leaving the Jackets ahead 3–7. UNC next scored on a long pass to Eric Highsmith who was left open on a blown coverage by a young safety. Roddy Jones was then able to score a receiving touchdown pass, making it 10–14.

Yates was finding ways to get the ball to receivers and the receivers were finding ways to make catches. Taking the ball 80 yards on the next drive and sneaking it in from the 1-yard line. The Jackets countered with a field goal to end the half, leaving it even at 17. The first miscue came from Georgia Tech when they fumbled a pitch when Roddy Jones slipped while in motion and lost pitch relationship. Giving the Tar Heels good field position they took a 24–17 lead on a run by White. Another fumble on their next drive caused Georgia Tech to punt. Then a fumble by Yates after running into his fullback returned the ball to the Jackets.

A big third down pass with eleven yards to go saw Nesbitt find Jones after scrambling. Jones escaped down to the five-yard line. Tech found the end zone after a run by Allen and a Nesbitt keeper. Bringing the score to 24–24.

On its next drive UNC was forced to punt. This drive saw the Jackets only incompletion which came when Embry Peeples caught the pass but was unable to stay in bounds. This setup Scott Blair with a 46-yard field goal which he was able to convert. Giving them 27–24 lead. The Tar Heels next drive was ended when Zack Pianalto fumbled a completed pass. The Jackets were able to add another field goal before the end of the game.

=== North Carolina State ===
| Team | 1 | 2 | 3 | 4 | Total |
|---|---|---|---|---|---|
| • NC State | 7 | 10 | 14 | 14 | 45 |
| Georgia Tech | 0 | 7 | 7 | 14 | 28 |

- Date: September 25, 2010
- Location: Bobby Dodd Stadium
  Atlanta, GA
- Game start: 12:00 p.m.
- Game attendance: 48,825
- TV announcers (ESPN): Dave Pasch, Bob Griese, Chris Spielman

Coming back from a 31–14 deficit in the fourth quarter, Georgia Tech offered a fighting chance at defeating North Carolina State when Jerrard Tarrant returned a Russell Wilson interception for a touchdown with 12:25 remaining. Josh Nesbitt found a wide open Tyler Melton early in the final quarter to cut the N.C. State lead to ten at 31–21. Tarrant's interception came on N.C. State's ensuing drive. Tech earned itself a swivel of momentum as it strove to garner victory at Bobby Dodd Stadium. However, N.C. State and superstar quarterback Russell Wilson responded by scoring two touchdowns against Tech's vulnerable secondary to seal victory for the wolfpack in Atlanta.

=== Wake Forest ===
| Team | 1 | 2 | 3 | 4 | Total |
|---|---|---|---|---|---|
| • Georgia Tech | 3 | 3 | 0 | 18 | 24 |
| Wake Forest | 3 | 7 | 7 | 3 | 20 |

- Date: October 2, 2010
- Location: BB&T Field
  Winston-Salem, NC
- Game start: 7:00 p.m.
- Game attendance: 30,263
- TV announcers (ESPNU): Rob Stone, David Pollack

Trailing 17–6 in the fourth quarter, Georgia Tech bested Wake Forest on the strength a comeback led by Quarterback Joshua Nesbitt, A-back Embry Peeples, and WR Correy Earls to shock the Demon Deacons in Winston-Salem, North Carolina. Following a Scott Blair 43-yard field goal, Georgia Tech found itself at 4th and 5 on Wake Forest's thirty-yard line, where Josh Nesbitt found Embry Peeples for a Touchdown pass. Tech needed to convert a two-point conversion to tie the game. Paul Johnson and the Yellow Jackets did just that, executing the same play it ran against the University of Georgia in Athens on November 29, 2008 – when it tied that ballgame at 28. The Tech defense allowed Wake Forest to earn a field goal on the next drive. However, on Tech's ensuing drive, veteran Quarterback Josh Nesbitt took the team on his shoulders, leading the Tech offense down the field. Nesbitt converted a 4th and 5 in the process with a twenty-yard scramble for a first down. To cap off the thrilling comeback, Nesbitt found senior wideout Correy Earls on a slant route with 15 seconds left in the endzone. Tech took the lead 24–20. The win preserved Coach Johnson's streak of zero consecutive losses, and increased his record to 23–9 at Georgia Tech.

=== Virginia ===
| Team | 1 | 2 | 3 | 4 | Total |
|---|---|---|---|---|---|
| Virginia | 0 | 7 | 7 | 7 | 21 |
| • Georgia Tech | 3 | 10 | 14 | 6 | 33 |

- Date: October 9, 2010
- Location: Bobby Dodd Stadium
  Atlanta, GA
- Game start: 3:30 p.m.
- Game attendance: 48,016
- TV announcers (ESPNU): Pam Ward, Danny Kanell

As the Yellow Jackets and Cavaliers met in Atlanta it pitted Al Groh against his former team for the first time. Groh was head coach at Virginia since 2000 before taking over as defensive coordinator at Tech. Although Virginia was able to move the ball for 376 yards they had no luck slowing down the Jackets who racked up 536 yards. Tech opened the scoring with a field goal. Then Virginia was able to reach the end zone. The rest of the day was all Jackets as they added a field goal and a touchdown before the half. Anthony Allen led the Jackets in rushing with 195 yards on 25 carries. He was followed by Nesbitt who had 109 yards on 21 carries. Vercia was able to amass 239 passing yards while going 18/31, his leading receiver on the day was Snyder with 96 yards.

=== Middle Tennessee ===
| Team | 1 | 2 | 3 | 4 | Total |
|---|---|---|---|---|---|
| Middle Tennessee | 0 | 7 | 0 | 7 | 14 |
| • Georgia Tech | 7 | 7 | 21 | 7 | 42 |

- Date: October 16, 2010
- Location: Bobby Dodd Stadium
  Atlanta, GA
- Game start: 3:30 p.m.
- Game attendance: 40,652
- TV announcers (ESPN3): Dave Weekley, Warrick Dunn

The Middle Tennessee Blue Raiders of the Sun Belt Conference traveled to Atlanta challenge the Yellow Jackets of Georgia Tech. The Jackets' defense were able to force 6 turnovers during the course of the game, 2 fumbles and 4 interceptions. The Jackets were also able to spread the ball around the offense with 12 different players carrying the ball. With Nesbitt and Allen leading the way.

=== Clemson ===
| Team | 1 | 2 | 3 | 4 | Total |
|---|---|---|---|---|---|
| Georgia Tech | 0 | 3 | 10 | 0 | 13 |
| • Clemson | 10 | 7 | 7 | 3 | 27 |

- Date: October 23, 2010
- Location: Memorial Stadium
  Clemson, SC
- Game start: 3:30 p.m.
- Game attendance: 78,522
- TV announcers (ABC/ESPN): Mike Patrick, Craig James

Georgia Tech and Clemson were both looking for big conference wins to stay in the hunt for a spot in the ACC Championship Game. Andre Ellington was the story for the Tigers' offense as he was able to find the endzone 3 times. Georgia Tech was never really able to get the wheels rolling on offense as they were held under 250 yards rushing. This from the nation's leading rushing team averaging over 300 yards per game. They were also able to hold Nesbitt to just 2 total yards rushing. This includes yardage loss on sacks. Nesbitt has rushed for over 100 yards in 4 of 7 games this year.

=== Virginia Tech ===
| Team | 1 | 2 | 3 | 4 | Total |
|---|---|---|---|---|---|
| Georgia Tech | 14 | 0 | 0 | 7 | 21 |
| • Virginia Tech | 0 | 7 | 0 | 21 | 28 |

- Date: November 4, 2010
- Location: Lane Stadium, Blacksburg, VA
- Game start: 7:30 p.m.
- Game attendance: 66,233
- TV announcers (ESPN): Rece Davis, Craig James, Jesse Palmer, Jenn Brown

The Jackets traveled to Lane Stadium to play a nationally televised Thursday night game. Since the league was split into two divisions either the Jackets or the Hokies have represented the Coastal Division in the ACC Championship Game. For the previous three years the winner of this match-up had gone on to win the ACC.

Georgia Tech took the opening kick-off and marched down the field. Starting with a 27-yard pitch to Orwin Smith, the drive, also featured Anthony Allen who also racked up 27 yards but on 5 carries. Nesbitt carried twice on the drive, once for 3 yards and a 1-yard carry into the endzone. After the Hokies first drive stalled the Jackets got the ball back on their 20-yard line. On the third play of the Jacket's drive Nesbitt rumbled for 71 yards to find the endzone before any Hokies were able to chase him down.

In their next possession Virginia Tech was able to drive the field and keep the score close. Tyrod Taylor was able to complete passes and scramble when needed to keep the drive alive but the drive was really led by the running of Ryan Williams. Williams touched the ball 6 times on the drive for 34 yards on the 10 play 73-yard drive. The Jackets were forced to punt on their next drive. On a third and goal play from the 8 Georgia Tech's Rod Sweeting was able to come up with a huge interception in the endzone. The favor was returned and then some on the next drive. Georgia Tech punted after a penalty and a sacked stalled their drive. The return was fumbled and the Jackets recovered. A 33-yard run by Allen put the Jackets in the red zone. On a third and goal from the 6 Nesbitt's pass was intercepted and the QB broke his right arm while trying to bring down the return man. Although Nesbitt would miss the rest of the game and the season with the injury it was not before he took over the all-time lead for rushing for the QB position in the ACC.

The whole third quarter saw the Jackets and the Hokies trade possessions many times with no one adding to the scoreboard. The Jackets reserve QB Tevin Washington played well but the Jackets sorely missed their Senior leader. The Hokies were next to score. A passer interference call on the Jackets moved the Hokies close enough for David Wilson to find the end zone, tying the score at 14–14. The Jackets were still yet to find a rhythm after losing their QB and had to punt once again. The Hokies continued to run well, this time on the legs of Darren Evans. Taking the lead 21–14 on a pass from Tyrod to Andre Smith.

With only 6 minutes left in the game the Jackets were searching for a spark to get them back in the hunt. The spark came when on the first play Washington complete a 42-yard pass to Tyler Melton. The Jackets then found themselves on fourth down with 4 yards to go. The ball was pitched to Roddy Jones who stopped and looked to throw back to Washington who was covered. Jones was able to tuck the ball, run up the middle, and get past the down marker to pick up a first down. The Jackets capped the drive with a 9-yard touchdown rush by Orwin Smith with just over 2 minutes left to play.

The ensuing kickoff was returned 90 yards for a touchdown by David Wilson putting the Hokies up, 28–21. The Jackets made an effort on their last drive. A sack for a loss of 2 yards on the first play, then a false start, and an incomplete pass left Jackets with a third and 17. Tevin Washington dropped back to pass and all receivers are covered but after picking up a block from Allen Washington scrambled for a first down. After another incompletion and false start Washington complete a pass to Kevin Cone for 38 yards. So with just over 40 seconds left the Jackets move into striking distance at the Hokies' 37-yard line. After a pairing of rushes and timeouts the Jackets were on the 16 with 14 seconds left. Washington's attempted fade to the end zone saw Tyler Melton with single coverage by Rashad Carmichael in the end zone. Carmichael was able to out-battle Melton for the slightly underthrown ball by the inexperienced Washington. This was the first time in the Paul Johnson era at Georgia Tech that his team had had back-to-back loses.

=== Miami (FL) ===
| Team | 1 | 2 | 3 | 4 | Total |
|---|---|---|---|---|---|
| • Miami (FL) | 14 | 0 | 14 | 7 | 35 |
| Georgia Tech | 0 | 3 | 7 | 0 | 10 |

- Date: November 13, 2010
- Location: Bobby Dodd Stadium
  Atlanta, GA
- Game start: 12:00 p.m.
- Game attendance: 47,425
- TV announcers (ACC Network): Tim Brant, Dave Archer, Mike Hogewood

In this match-up Miami was looking to stay poised to challenge Virginia Tech for the Coastal Division in their game next week. Both clubs would be starting backup quarterbacks as Jacory Harris was sidelined with a concussion and Joshua Nesbitt out with a broken arm. Tevin Washington stepped in for Nesbitt and didn't have a bad day statistically except for the one that matters most, score. The Jackets were able to rack up 409 total yards, 308 rushing and 101 passing, but could only must 10 points on the day. Washington was the leading rusher with 122 yards on 21 carries followed by Orwin Smith with 88 yards and Allen with 77 yards. Kevin Cone was the leading receiver for the Jackets with 3 catches for 42 yards and a touchdown.

Miami's offense was just too much for the Jackets' defense. The true freshmen Stephen Morris was able to step in for Harris and spread the ball around to Miami's many weapons. Gaining 507 yards on the day, 230 in the air and 277 on the ground. Hankerson was the leading receiver with 132 yards and a touchdown. The running attack was handle by committee with 7 backs rushing for positive yards. Lamar Miller, Damien Berry, Mike James, and Graig Cooper all were able to find the endzone.

=== Duke ===
| Team | 1 | 2 | 3 | 4 | Total |
|---|---|---|---|---|---|
| Duke | 3 | 10 | 0 | 7 | 20 |
| • Georgia Tech | 3 | 3 | 17 | 7 | 30 |

- Date: November 20, 2010
- Location: Bobby Dodd Stadium
  Atlanta, GA
- Game start: 1:30 p.m.
- Game attendance: 42,110
- TV announcers (ESPN3): Doug Bell, Warrick Dunn, Angela Mallen

Things didn't look good early for the Yellow Jackets of Georgia Tech as they looked for their 6th win of the season to make them bowl eligible. The first quarter saw both teams able to convert on field goals as a big block in the back penalty called back a touchdown rush by Anthony Allen. In the second Tech added another field goal to make it 6–3. On the next possession the Blue Devils were able to catch the Jackets off-guard with a fake punt. Just three plays later Duke backup QB Brandon Connette scampered for 20 yards for the score. On the ensuing kickoff an illegal formation moved the Blue Devils back 5 yards. The re-kick saw an offsides call on Duke. Even though Tech got the ball with good field position they were unable to capitalize. Duke was able to add another field goal to take a 6–13 lead into the half.

Play resumed after the half with a Duke fumble on the kickoff that was recovered by B.J. Bostic. The Jackets were able to add a field goal to bring it to 9–13. Duke's next drive ended with a big play from the Jackets' defense. Brandon Connette the backup QB who is usually brought in to run a wild cat type running attack was intercepted by Mario Butler. Butler was able to return the interception 85 yards for a touchdown giving the lead to the Jackets, 16–13. Duke's next drive stalled and Tech's offense was finally able to hit a stride as they were able to run up the middle for good yardage over the next drive. Washington scored from 1 yard out to take the score to 23–13.

In the fourth quarter Duke made an attempt to get back in the game as Sean Renfree completed a touchdown pass to Austin Kelly to bring the score to 23–20. After trading possessions Tech rounded out the scoring with a pass to Stephen Hill for 79 yards. With the win, the Yellow Jackets maintained their conference record of years finishing at .500 or better in the ACC for 16 straight seasons. They also became bowl eligible for the 14th straight season.

=== Georgia ===
| Team | 1 | 2 | 3 | 4 | Total |
|---|---|---|---|---|---|
| Georgia Tech | 0 | 14 | 7 | 13 | 34 |
| • Georgia | 14 | 7 | 14 | 7 | 42 |

- Date: November 27, 2010
- Location: Sanford Stadium
  Athens, GA
- Game start: 7:45 p.m.
- Game attendance: 92,746
- TV announcers (ESPN): Mark Jones, Bob Davie

=== Air Force ===
| Team | 1 | 2 | 3 | 4 | Total |
|---|---|---|---|---|---|
| • Air Force | 3 | 3 | 0 | 8 | 14 |
| Georgia Tech | 7 | 0 | 0 | 0 | 7 |

- Date: December 27, 2010
- Location: Independence Stadium
  Shreveport, LA
- Game start: 5:00 p.m.
- Game attendance: 39,362
- TV announcers (ESPN2/SportsUSA Radio): Mark Jones, Bob Davie, Eamon McAnaney/Rich Cellini, Charles Arbuckle, Rich Herrera
