= 2010 Wake Forest Demon Deacons football team =

American college football season

2010 Wake Forest Demon Deacons football
- Conference: Atlantic Coast Conference
- Atlantic Division
- Record: 3–9 (1–7 ACC)
- Head coach: Jim Grobe (10th season)
- Offensive coordinator: Steed Lobotzke (8th season)
- Offensive scheme: Spread
- Defensive coordinator: Brad Lambert (3rd season)
- Base defense: 4–3
- Captains: Marshall Williams; Josh Adams; Russell Nenon; Hunter Haynes
- Home stadium: BB&T Field

2010 Atlantic Coast Conference football standings
	Conf.			Overall
Team	W		L	W		L
Atlantic Division
No. 17 Florida State x	6	–	2	10	–	4
No. 23 Maryland	5	–	3	9	–	4
No. 25 NC State	5	–	3	9	–	4
Boston College	4	–	4	7	–	6
Clemson	4	–	4	6	–	7
Wake Forest	1	–	7	3	–	9
Coastal Division
No. 16 Virginia Tech x$	8	–	0	11	–	3
Miami (FL)	5	–	3	7	–	6
Georgia Tech	4	–	4	6	–	7
North Carolina	4	–	4	8	–	5
Duke	1	–	7	3	–	9
Virginia	1	–	7	4	–	8
Championship: Virginia Tech 44, Florida State 33
$ – BCS representative as conference champion; x – Division champion/co-champions; Rankings from AP Poll

The 2010 Wake Forest Demon Deacons football team represented Wake Forest University during the 2010 NCAA Division I FBS football season. The team was coached by Jim Grobe, who was coaching his tenth season at the school, and played its home games at BB&T Field. Wake Forest competes in the Atlantic Coast Conference, as they have since the league's inception in 1953. They finished the season 3–9, 1–7 in ACC play.

== Before the season ==
=== Recruiting ===
On National Signing Day, the Demon Deacons received letters of intent from 21 players.

- Zachary Allen LB 6–2 210 Pahokee, Fla. Pahokee
- Neil Basford TE 6–4 240 Jacksonville, Fla. Bishop Kenny
- Daniel Blitch OL 6–6 305 Gainesville, Ga. North Hall
- Joseph Byrd RB 5–10 170 Cape Coral, Fla. Ida Baker
- Desmond Cooper S 6–2 200 Jacksonville, Fla. Bolles School
- Ben Emert RB 6–1 225 Ball Ground, Ga. West Forsyth
- Logan Feimster LS 6–4 235 Statesville, N.C. Statesville
- Antonio Ford DT 6–3 280 Pahokee, Fla. Pahokee
- Jonathan Garcia TE 6–4 230 Cape Coral, Fla. Ida Baker
- Dylan Heartsill OT 6–5 310 Prattville, Ala. Prattville Christian
- Matt James WR 6–5 205 Raleigh, N.C. Sanderson
- Kevin Johnson CB 6–0 160 Clarksville, Md. River Hill
- Nick Knott RB 5–10 170 Wylie, Texas Wylie
- A.J. Marshall CB 5–11 180 Durham, N.C. Southern
- Duke Mosby DT 6–2 290 Washington, D.C. Woodberry Forest
- Merrill Noel CB 5–10 180 Pahokee, Fla. Pahokee
- Tanner Price QB 6–2 190 Austin, Texas Westlake
- Colin Summers OG 6–4 310 Raleigh, N.C. Needham Broughton
- Brandon Terry WR 6–5 210 Alpharetta, Ga. Alpharetta
- Patrick Thompson LB 6–2 200 Ashburn, Va. Stone Bridge
- Daniel Vogelsang DE 6–3 245 Versailles, Ky. Lexington Catholic

== Schedule ==
Date	Time	Opponent	Site	TV	Result	Attendance	Source
September 2	6:30 pm	Presbyterian*	BB&T Field; Winston-Salem, NC	ESPN3; Ryan Rose, Warrick Dunn	W 53–13	28,205	
September 11	12:00 pm	Duke	BB&T Field; Winston-Salem, NC (rivalry)	ACCN; Steve Martin, Dave Archer, Mike Hogewood	W 54–48	31,673	
September 18	11:15 pm	at No. 19 Stanford*	Stanford Stadium; Stanford, CA	ESPN2; Carter Blackburn, Brock Huard	L 24–68	39,061	
September 25	3:30 pm	at Florida State	Doak Campbell Stadium; Tallahassee, Florida	ABC; Mike Patrick, Craig James	L 0–31	61,647	
October 2	7:00 pm	Georgia Tech	BB&T Field; Winston-Salem, NC	ESPNU; Rob Stone, David Pollack	L 20–24	30,263	
October 9	6:30 pm	Navy*^{†}	BB&T Field; Winston-Salem, NC	ESPN3; Ryan Rose, Eddie Robinson Jr., Angela Mallen	L 27–28	31,454	
October 16	3:30 pm	at Virginia Tech	Lane Stadium; Blacksburg, VA	ESPNU; Pam Ward, Danny Kanell	L 21–52	66,233	
October 30	3:30 pm	at Maryland	Byrd Stadium; College Park, MD	ESPNU; Pam Ward, Danny Kanell	L 14–62	39,063	
November 6	3:30 pm	Boston College	BB&T Field; Winston-Salem, NC	ESPN3; Matt Sweirad, John Gregory	L 13–23	29,465	
November 13	2:00 pm	at NC State	Carter–Finley Stadium; Raleigh, NC (rivalry)	ESPN3; BJ Schaben, Eddie Robinson Jr., Angela Mallen	L 3–38	57,161	
November 20	2:00 pm	Clemson	BB&T Field; Winston-Salem, NC	ESPN3; Ryan Rose, John Gregory	L 10–30	31,783	
November 27	7:30 pm	at Vanderbilt*	Vanderbilt Stadium; Nashville, TN	CSS; Matt Stewart, Chris Doering, Allison Williams	W 34–13	21,338	
*Non-conference game; ^{†}Homecoming; Rankings from Coaches' Poll released prior to the game; All times are in Eastern time

== Roster ==
Offense Quarterbacks: 10 Turner Faulk – (redshirt) Sophomore; 11 Tanner Price – Freshman; 12 Skylar Jones – (redshirt) Junior; 13 Ted Stachitas – (redshirt) Sophomore; 14 Patrick Thompson – Freshman; 15 Brendan Cross – (redshirt) Freshman; Running backs: 22 Brandon Pendergrass – (redshirt) Junior; 25 Josh Harris – (redshirt) Freshman; 27 Josh Adams – (redshirt) Senior; 29 Tyler Jackson – Freshman; 30 Nick Knott – Freshman; 34 Willie Dixon – (redshirt) Junior; 44 Ben Emert – Freshman; Fullbacks: 39 Roger Khouri – (redshirt) Freshman; 42 Tommy Bohanon – Sophomore; 48 Jordan Garside – Freshman; Wide receivers: 2 Chris Givens – (redshirt) Sophomore; 3 Devon Brown – (redshirt) Junior; 8 Marshall Williams – (redshirt) Senior; 9 Jordan Williams – Senior; 17 Chris Langley – (redshirt) Senior; 18 Danny Dembry – (redshirt) Junior; 20 Lovell Jackson – (redshirt) Sophomore; 28 Michael Campanaro – (redshirt) Freshman; 81 Terence Davis – (redshirt) Sophomore; 86 Brandon Terry – Freshman; 87 Matt James – Freshman; 88 Quan Rucker – (redshirt) Freshman; Tight ends: 43 Spencer Bishop – (redshirt) Freshman; 49 Zach Massey – (redshirt) Freshman; 80 Andrew Parker – Junior; 83 Cameron Ford – (redshirt) Junior; 84 Jonathan Garcia – Freshman; 85 Neil Basford – Freshman; Offensive Linemen: 59 Antonio Ford – Freshman; 60 Whit Barnes – (redshirt) Freshman; 62 Doug Weaver – (redshirt) Junior; 66 Chance Raines – (redshirt) Sophomore; 68 Colin Summers – Freshman; 69 Dennis Godfrey – (redshirt) Junior; 70 Dylan Heartsill – Freshman; 71 Ryan Britt – (redshirt) Junior; 72 Russell Nenon – (redshirt) Senior; 73 Steven Chase – (redshirt) Freshman; 74 Garrick Williams – (redshirt) Sophomore; 75 Michael Hoag – (redshirt) Junior; 76 Daniel Blitch – Freshman; 77 Devin Bolling – (redshirt) Freshman; 78 Joe Looney – Junior; 79 Gabe Irby – (redshirt) Sophomore	Defense Defensive ends: 49 Derricus Ellis – (redshirt) Sophomore; 51 Daniel Vogelsang – Freshman; 55 Tristan Dorty – (redshirt) Junior; 57 Gelo Orange – (redshirt) Junior; 63 Tyler King – Senior; 90 Will Wright – (redshirt) Junior; 94 Tripp Russell – (redshirt) Senior; 95 Kevin Smith – (redshirt) Freshman; 97 Kyle Wilber – (redshirt) Junior; 98 Zach Thompson – (redshirt) Freshman; Defensive tackles: 50 Nikita Whitlock – (redshirt) Freshman; 54 Kris Redding – (redshirt) Freshman; 64 Bryson Dunmeyer – (redshirt) Sophomore; 91 John Gallagher – (redshirt) Freshman; 93 Frank Souza – (redshirt) Freshman; 96 Duke Mosby – Freshman; 99 Ramon Booi – (redshirt) Freshman; Linebackers: 32 Scott Betros – (redshirt) Sophomore; 35 Lee Malchow – (redshirt) Senior; 38 Zachary Allen – Freshman; 39 Justin Jackson – (redshirt) Freshman; 40 Joey Ehrmann – (redshirt) Sophomore; 41 Mike Olson – (redshirt) Freshman; 43 Kyle Jarrett – (redshirt) Junior; 45 Riley Haynes – (redshirt) Sophomore; 46 Matt Woodlief – (redshirt) Senior; 53 Joe Hall – (redshirt) Junior; 56 Hunter Haynes – (redshirt) Senior; 58 J.D. Oglesby – (redshirt) Sophomore; 60 Barrett Powell – (redshirt) Sophomore; Cornerbacks: 4 Josh Bush – (redshirt) Junior; 6 Kenny Okoro – (redshirt) Sophomore; 9 Kevin Johnson – Freshman; 10 Merrill Noel – Freshman; 14 C.J. Washington – (redshirt) Junior; 17 A.J. Marshall – Freshman; 20 Jason Green – (redshirt) Freshman; 37 Morgan Harris – (redshirt) Sophomore; Safeties: 5 Cyhl Quarles – (redshirt) Junior; 18 Josh Strickland – (redshirt) Freshman; 21 Alex Frye – (redshirt) Senior; 23 Daniel Mack – (redshirt) Freshman; 25 Joe LaBarbera – Freshman; 26 Duran Lowe – (redshirt) Freshman; 28 J'harrison Gillespie – (redshirt) Freshman; 30 John Stamper – (redshirt) Junior; 36 Desmond Cooper – Freshman	Special teams Placekickers: 37 Shane Popham – (redshirt) Junior; 82 Jimmy Newman – Sophomore; Punters: 24 Alex Wulfeck – (redshirt) Freshman; 37 Shane Popham – (redshirt) Junior; Long Snappers: 49 Zach Massey – (redshirt) Freshman; 52 Logan Feimster – Freshman; 53 Greg Bechtel – (redshirt) Senior; Kick returners: 2 Chris Givens – (redshirt) Sophomore; 3 Devon Brown – (redshirt) Junior; 28 Michael Campanaro – (redshirt) Freshman; Punt Returners: 3 Devon Brown – (redshirt) Junior; 28 Michael Campanaro – (redshirt) Freshman

== Coaching staff ==
Position	Name	First year at WFU
Head coach	Jim Grobe	2001
Secondary	Keith Henry	2006
Quarterbacks	Tom Elrod	2003
Defensive ends	Tim Billings	2006
Wide Receivers	Brian Knorr	2008
Defensive coordinator / defensive backs	Brad Lambert	2001
Offensive coordinator / offensive line	Steed Lobotzke	2001
Defensive tackles	Ray McCartney	2001
Associate head coach / Running backs / Kickers	Billy Mitchell	2001
Linebackers	Steve Russ	2008

== Game summaries ==
=== Presbyterian ===
	1	2	3	4	Total
Presbyterian	0	7	6	0	13
Wake Forest	21	14	2	16	53

10th meeting. 5–4–1 all time. Last meeting 1945, 53–9 Demon Deacons in Wake Forest.

Wake Forest and Presbyterian kicked off the college football season on a Thursday night at BB&T Field. The Deacons started out quickly with a Ted Stachitis touchdown run, as he would be the first of five Wake Forest players to score rushing touchdowns. Alex Frye added an interception return touchdown to make it a 21–0 score after the first quarter. Presbyterian got on the board in the second quarter on a trick play, but Josh Harris scored his first collegiate touchdown two minutes later for a 35–7 halftime lead. The Deacs added two more rushing touchdowns in the second half, en route to over 400 yards rushing and a 53–13 win.

Passing Leaders	Rushing Leaders	Receiving Leaders	Total Yards
Ted Stachitas: 7/13, 84 YDS	Devon Brown: 2 CAR, 91 YDS, 1 TD, LG of 85	Marshall Williams: 2 REC, 39 YDS, LG of 33	Wake Forest: 509
Tanner Price: 1/7, 4 YDS	Ted Stachitas: 10 CAR, 76 YDS, 1 TD, LG of 34	Jordan Williams: 1 REC, 23 YDS, LG of 23	Presbyterian: 362

1st quarter

- 13:31 WFU– Ted Stachitas 34 YD Run (Jimmy Newman Kick) 7–0
- 08:29 WFU– Josh Adams 14 YD Run (Jimmy Newman Kick) 14–0
- 04:42 WFU– Alex Frye 44 YD Interception Return (Jimmy Newman Kick) 21–0

2nd quarter

- 03:27 WFU– Brandon Pendergrass 16 YD Run (Jimmy Newman Kick) 28–0
- 03:12 PC- Michael Ruff 68 YD Pass From Derrick Overholt (Cam Miller Kick) 28–7
- 01:01 WFU– Josh Harris 3 YD Run (Jimmy Newman Kick) 35–7

3rd quarter

- 11:40 PC- Anderico Bailey 18 YD Pass From Brandon Miley (Kenny Okoro Return Blocked XP for 2PT) 37–13

4th quarter

- 11:18 WFU– Devon Brown 85 YD Run (Jimmy Newman Kick) 44–13
- 04:13 WFU– Jimmy Newman 36 YD FG 47–13
- 01:25 WFU– Josh Harris 46 YD Run (2PT Conversion Failed) 53–13

=== Duke ===
	1	2	3	4	Total
Duke	14	21	3	10	48
Wake Forest	7	28	6	13	54

91st meeting. 35–53–2 all time. Last meeting 2009, 45–34 Demon Deacons in Durham. Heading into this game, Wake Forest has won 10 straight against Duke.

Wake Forest and Duke opened the 2010 ACC football season with an offensive explosion. Each team found the end zone five times in the first half on the ground, in the air, and even on special teams. Duke quarterback Sean Renfree threw four touchdowns, 3 in the first half. Wake got three touchdown passes from true freshman Tanner Price, as well as one from wide receiver Marshall Williams, who threw and caught two touchdowns in the game. After a 49-point second quarter, the teams combined for only 9 in the third, but a Price to Williams touchdown pass in the third gave Wake a lead they would not relinquish, as they beat Duke for the 11th consecutive time.

Passing Leaders	Rushing Leaders	Receiving Leaders	Total Yards
Tanner Price: 12/19, 190 YDS, 3 TDS	Ted Stachitas: 9 CAR, 77 YDS, 1 TD, LG of 23	Chris Givens: 4 REC, 159 YDS, 1 TD, LG of 81	Wake Forest: 500
Marshall Williams: 1/1, 81 YDS, 1 TD	Tanner Price: 10 CAR, 56 YDS, 1 TD, LG of 13	Marshall Williams: 2 REC, 51 YDS, 2 TD, LG of 38	Duke: 487

1st quarter

- 11:13 WFU– Ted Stachitas 23 YD Run (Jimmy Newman Kick) 7–0
- 07:37 DUKE– Brandon "Clavinet" Connette 4 YD Run (Will Snyderwine Kick) 7–7
- 03:12 DUKE- Cooper Helfet 9 YD Pass From Sean Renfree (Will Snyderwine Kick) 7–14

2nd quarter

- 14:13 WFU– Chris Givens 18 YD Fumble Return (Jimmy Newman Kick) 14–14
- 08:07 WFU– Tanner Price 1 YD Run (Jimmy Newman Kick) 21–14
- 07:52 DUKE- Conner Vernon 70 YD Pass From Sean Renfree (Will Snyderwine Kick) 21–21
- 07:39 WFU- Chris Givens 81 YD Pass From Marshall Williams (Jimmy Newman Kick) 28–21
- 05:17 WFU– Marshall Williams 13 YD Pass From Tanner Price (Jimmy Newman Kick) 35–21
- 02:43 DUKE- Desmond Scott 63 YD Run (Will Snyderwine Kick) 35–28
- 00:41 DUKE- Austin Kelly 13 YD Pass From Sean Renfree (Will Snyderwine Kick) 35–35

3rd quarter

- 08:12 WFU– Marshall Williams 38 YD Pass From Tanner Price (2PT Conversion Failed) 41–35
- 03:13 DUKE- Will Snyderwine 46 YD FG 41–38

4th quarter

- 11:18 WFU– Danny Dembry 23 YD Pass from Tanner Price (Jimmy Newman Kick) 48–38
- 08:45 DUKE- Will Snyderwine 38 YD FG 48–41
- 02:53 WFU– Devon Brown 6 YD Run (2PT Conversion Failed) 54–41
- 01:39 DUKE- Conner Vernon 51 YD Pass From Sean Renfree (Will Snyderwine Kick) 54–48

=== Stanford ===
	1	2	3	4	Total
Wake Forest	7	3	14	0	24
#19 Stanford	14	27	14	13	68

2nd meeting. 1–0 all time. Last meeting 2009, 24–17 Demon Deacons in Winston-Salem. Return game in two-game home and away series with Stanford. Stanford traveled to Wake Forest in 2009

After a long trip out west, Wake Forest was not able to stand the Stanford offensive onslaught. The Cardinal scored touchdowns on their first eight possessions, including all six in the first half. Stanford quarterback Andrew Luck picked apart the Deacs with four touchdown passes, as well as a 52-yard touchdown run. The Deacons scored three rushing touchdowns, one each from Chris Givens, Tanner Price, and Michael Campanaro. It was Campanaro's first collegiate touchdown.

Passing Leaders	Rushing Leaders	Receiving Leaders	Total Yards
Tanner Price: 8/18, 76 YDS	Tanner Price: 16 CAR, 65 YDS, 1 TD, LG of 28	Chris Givens: 4 REC, 47 YDS, LG of 32	Wake Forest: 283
Brendan Cross: 0/2	Michael Campanaro: 4 CAR, 41 YDS, 1 TD, LG of 22	Devon Brown: 1 REC, 10 YDS, LG of 10	Stanford: 535

1st quarter

- 09:12 STAN- Chris Owusu 8 YD Pass from Andrew Luck (Nate Whitaker Kick) 0–7
- 07:00 WFU– Chris Givens 22 YD Run (Jimmy Newman Kick) 7–7
- 06:24 STAN- Chris Owusu 35 YD Pass from Andrew Luck (Nate Whitaker Kick) 7–14

2nd quarter

- 13:56 STAN- Tyler Gaffney 4 YD Run (Nate Whitaker Kick) 7–21
- 11:12 STAN- Usua Amanam 12 YD Pass from Andrew Luck (Kick Failed) 7–27
- 07:42 STAN- Andrew Luck 52 YD Run (Nate Whitaker Kick) 7–34
- 02:50 STAN- Tyler Gaffney 2 YD Run (Nate Whitaker Kick) 7–41
- 00:04 WFU– Jimmy Newman 48 YD FG 10–41

3rd quarter

- 12:59 STAN- Stepfan Taylor 9 YD Run (Nate Whitaker Kick) 10–48
- 11:05 STAN- Doug Baldwin 3 YD Pass from Andrew Luck (Nate Whitaker Kick) 10–55
- 08:46 WFU– Tanner Price 28 YD Run (Jimmy Newman Kick) 17–55
- 00:20 WFU– Michael Campanaro 22 YD Run (Jimmy Newman Kick) 24–55

4th quarter

- 08:41 STAN- Alex Loukas 15 YD Run (PAT Failed) 24–61
- 06:06 STAN- Andrew Stutz 2 YD Run (Nate Whitaker Kick) 24–68

=== Florida State ===
	1	2	3	4	Total
Wake Forest	0	0	0	0	0
Florida State	0	10	7	14	31

29th meeting. 5–22–1 all time. Last meeting 2009, 41–28 Seminoles in Winston-salem.

For the second consecutive week, Wake Forest was beaten by a large margin on the road. Christian Ponder threw two touchdown passes, which was more than enough for the Seminoles defense, who shut out the Deacs and allowed only 185 yards of total offense. Ponder added a rushing touchdown, and backup quarterback E.J. Manuel added a touchdown pass as well. The Deacons were shut out for the first time since 2008.

Passing Leaders	Rushing Leaders	Receiving Leaders	Total Yards
Ted Stachitas: 5/5, 47 YDS	Josh Adams: 10 CAR, 35 YDS, LG of 14	Danny Dembry: 1 REC, 17 YDS, LG of 17	Wake Forest: 185
Tanner Price: 6/12, 35 YDS	Chris Givens: 3 CAR, 25 YDS, LG of 18	Marshall Williams: 2 REC, 14 YDS, LG of 10	Florida State: 485

1st quarter

- no scoring

2nd quarter

- 13:22 FSU- Willie Haulstead 10 YD Pass from Christian Ponder (Dustin Hopkins Kick) 0–7
- 05:28 FSU- Dustin Hopkins 34 YD FG 0–10

3rd quarter

- 08:34 FSU- Christian Ponder 6 YD Run (Dustin Hopkins Kick) 0–17

4th quarter

- 07:28 FSU- Willie Haulstead 4 YD Pass from Christian Ponder (Dustin Hopkins Kick) 0–24
- 01:04 FSU- Kenny Shaw 23 YD Pass from E.J. Manuel (Dustin Hopkins Kick) 0–31

=== Georgia Tech ===
	1	2	3	4	Total
Georgia Tech	3	3	0	18	24
Wake Forest	3	7	7	3	20

30th meeting. 8–21 all time. Last meeting 2009, 30–27 Yellow Jackets in Atlanta.

The Deacons led 17–6 heading into the fourth quarter, but Josh Nesbitt led Georgia Tech back into the game, culminating in a nine-yard touchdown pass to Correy Earls with only fifteen seconds left. Brandon Pendergrass and Josh Adams had touchdown runs for the Deacons, who played much of the game with reserve quarterback Skylar Jones after injuries claimed starting quarterback Ted Stachitas and backup Brendan Cross. The loss was the Deacons third straight, and second straight close loss to Georgia Tech.

Passing Leaders	Rushing Leaders	Receiving Leaders	Total Yards
Skylar Jones: 9/20, 105 YDS	Josh Adams: 20 CAR, 101 YDS, 1 TD, LG of 57	Devon Brown: 4 REC, 54 YDS, LG of 26	Wake Forest: 268
Brendan Cross: 1/2, 2 YDS	Skylar Jones: 8 CAR, 31 YDS, LG of 18	Cameron Ford: 1 REC, 21 YDS, LG of 21	Georgia Tech: 339

1st quarter

- 10:54 GT- Scott Blair 47 YD FG 0–3
- 03:51 WFU- Jimmy Newman 20 YD FG 3–3

2nd quarter

- 01:22 WFU- Brandon Pendergrass 1 YD Run (Jimmy Newman Kick) 10–3
- 00:27 GT- Scott Blair 45 YD FG 10–6

3rd quarter

- 00:42 WFU- Josh Adams 3 YD Run (Jimmy Newman Kick) 17–6

4th quarter

- 10:23 GT- Scott Blair 42 YD FG 17–9
- 06:50 GT- Embry Peeples 20 YD Pass from Joshua Nesbitt (Joshua Nesbitt Run for 2PT Conversion) 17–17
- 02:21 WFU- Jimmy Newman 26 YD FG 20–17
- 00:15 GT- Correy Earls 9 YD Pass from Joshua Nesbitt (Scott Blair Kick) 20–24

=== Navy ===
	1	2	3	4	Total
Navy	7	7	7	7	28
Wake Forest	7	10	7	3	27

12th meeting. 7–4 all time. Last meeting 2009, 13–10 Midshipmen in Annapolis. This game is the last of a four-game series between the two teams. Wake Forest won in 2007, and Navy won in 2008 and 2009.

For the second consecutive week, Wake Forest allowed a last minute touchdown which led to a loss. Ricky Dobbs found Greg Jones on a 6-yard touchdown pass with 26 seconds to go to give Navy a 28–27 lead. Tanner Price led the Deacons with a career-high 326 yards and 3 total touchdowns. Chris Givens and Devon Brown had touchdown catches for the Deacs, and Jimmy Newman added two FGs. The Deacons outgained the Midshipmen 403–368, but were unable to hold on to the win.

Passing Leaders	Rushing Leaders	Receiving Leaders	Total Yards
Tanner Price: 37/53, 326 YDS, 2 TDS	Josh Harris: 14 CAR, 46 YDS, LG of 15	Chris Givens: 7 REC, 60 YDS, 1 TD, LG of 15	Wake Forest: 403
	Brandon Pendergrass: 3 CAR, 19 YDS, LG of 13	Devon Brown: 10 REC, 59 YDS, 1 TD, LG of 12	Navy: 368

1st quarter

- 12:44 WFU- Tanner Price 1 YD Run (Jimmy Newman Kick) 7–0
- 07:34 NAVY- Alexander Teich 6 YD Pass from Ricky Dobbs (Joe Buckley Kick) 7–7

2nd quarter

- 13:24 WFU- Jimmy Newman 45 YD FG 10–7
- 10:12 NAVY- Ricky Dobbs 3 YD Run (Joe Buckley Kick) 10–14
- 00:12 WFU- Chris Givens 11 YD Pass from Tanner Price (Jimmy Newman Kick) 17–14

3rd quarter

- 11:59 NAVY- Ricky Dobbs 4 YD Run (Joe Buckley Kick) 17–21
- 01:08 WFU- Devon Brown 12 YD Pass from Tanner Price (Jimmy Newman Kick) 24–21

4th quarter

- 08:34 WFU- Jimmy Newman 31 YD FG 27–21
- 00:26 NAVY- Greg Jones 6 YD Pass from Ricky Dobbs (Joe Buckely Kick) 27–28

=== Virginia Tech ===
	1	2	3	4	Total
Wake Forest	7	7	7	0	21
Virginia Tech	21	28	3	0	52

35th meeting. 11–22–1 all time. Last meeting 2006, 27–6 Hokies in Winston-Salem. This is Wake Forest's first game at Virginia Tech since the Hokies joined the ACC in 2004.

The Demon Deacons' slide continued, as they dropped their fifth straight game, this time to Virginia Tech. The Hokies scored 49 first half points en route to a lopsided result. The bright spot for Wake came from freshman running back Josh Harris, who ran for 241 yards and 2 touchdowns. It was the most yards ever allowed to a player by Virginia Tech. Tanner Price found Chris Givens for a 78-yard touchdown, but that was the bright spot in an otherwise forgettable day for the freshman quarterback.

Passing Leaders	Rushing Leaders	Receiving Leaders	Total Yards
Tanner Price: 3/16, 92 YDS, 1 TD	Josh Harris: 20 CAR, 241 YDS, 2 TDs, LG of 87	Chris Givens: 2 REC, 84 YDS, 1 TD, LG of 78	Wake Forest: 346
Skylar Jones: 1/1, 0 YDS	Michael Campanaro: 1 CAR, 12 YDS, LG of 12	Tommy Bohanon: 1 REC, 8 YDS, LG of 8	Virginia Tech: 605

1st quarter

- 13:29 VT- Logan Thomas 2 YD Pass from Tyrod Taylor (Chris Hazley Kick) 0–7
- 07:36 VT- Darren Evans 5 YD Run (Chris Hazley Kick) 0–14
- 06:17 WFU– Josh Harris 33 YD Run (Jimmy Newman Kick) 7–14
- 03:02 VT- Danny Coale 25 YD Pass from Tyrod Taylor (Chris Hazley Kick) 7–21

2nd quarter

- 12:34 VT- Darren Evans 8 YD Run (Chris Hazley Kick) 7–28
- 12:16 WFU– Josh Harris 87 YD Run (Jimmy Newman Kick) 14–28
- 08:59 VT- Tyrod Taylor 1 YD Run (Chris Hazley Kick) 14–35
- 03:36 VT- Darren Evans 1 YD Run (Chris Hazley Kick) 14–42
- 00:52 VT- Jarrett Boykin 10 YD Pass from Tyrod Taylor (Chris Hazley Kick) 14–29

3rd quarter

- 11:35 WFU– Chris Givens 78 YD Pass from Tanner Price (Jimmy Newman Kick) 21–49
- 04:52 VT- Chris Hazley 33 YD FG 21–52

4th quarter

- no scoring

=== Maryland ===
	1	2	3	4	Total
Wake Forest	7	0	0	7	14
Maryland	10	17	28	7	62

59th meeting. 16–41–1 all time. Last meeting 2009, 42–32 Demon Deacons in Winston-Salem.

Wake Forest lost another road game, this time a 62–14 decision to Maryland. The Terps blocked two Wake punts and returned two interceptions back for touchdowns. Josh Harris scored on a TD run for Wake, and Terrence Davis caught his first touchdown as a Demon Deacon, but it was nowhere near enough to stop the Terps, who received touchdowns from 8 different players. Maryland outgained Wake Forest in the game 446–155.

Passing Leaders	Rushing Leaders	Receiving Leaders	Total Yards
Tanner Price: 16/31, 156 YDS, 1 TD	Josh Harris: 10 CAR, 27 YDS, 1 TD, LG of 7	Marshall Williams: 5 REC, 62 YDS, LG of 34	Wake Forest: 155
Skylar Jones: 1/3, 2 YDS	Josh Adams: 4 CAR, 5 YDS, LG of 3	Michael Campanaro: 3 REC, 38 YDS, LG of 19	Maryland: 446

1st quarter

- 10:04 MD- Travis Baltz 22 YD FG 0–3
- 02:25 MD- Torrey Smith 17 YD Pass from Danny O'Brien (Travis Baltz Kick) 0–10
- 00:02 WFU– Josh Harris 6 YD Run (Jimmy Newman Kick) 7–10

2nd quarter

- 02:25 MD- Quintin McCree 28 YD Pass from Danny O'Brien (Travis Baltz Kick) 7–17
- 02:25 MD- Haroon Brown 3 YD Pass from Danny O'Brien (Travis Baltz Kick) 7–24
- 01:11 MD- Travis Baltz 32 YD FG 7–27

3rd quarter

- 13:04 MD– Kenny Tate 8 YD Interception Return (Travis Baltz Kick) 7–34
- 09:49 MD- LaQuan Williams 24 YD Pass from Danny O'Brien (Travis Baltz Kick) 7–41
- 09:15 MD– Ryan Donohue 24 YD Interception Return (Travis Baltz Kick) 7–48
- 02:56 MD– Davin Meggett 14 YD Run (Travis Baltz Kick) 7–55

4th quarter

- 14:49 WFU- Terence Davis 8 YD Pass from Tanner Price (Jimmy Newman Kick) 14–55
- 07:23 MD– D.J. Adams 1 YD Run (Travis Baltz Kick) 14–62

=== Boston College ===
	1	2	3	4	Total
Boston College	7	7	6	3	23
Wake Forest	3	3	0	7	13

18th meeting. 6–9–2 all time. Last meeting 2009, 27–24 Eagles in Chestnut Hill.

Wake Forest's losing streak reached 7 with a 23–13 loss to Boston College. Montel Harris led the way for the Eagles with 183 yards rushing and three touchdowns, and the BC defense turned over the Deacs 5 times. The lone Wake touchdown was a Marshall Williams to Chris Givens strike on a reverse pass, the second time the two combined for a score on the season. With the loss, the Demon Deacons have been eliminated from bowl contention for the second consecutive season.

Passing Leaders	Rushing Leaders	Receiving Leaders	Total Yards
Tanner Price: 18/30, 177 YDS	Josh Harris: 19 CAR, 67 YDS, LG of 18	Chris Givens: 5 REC, 96 YDS, 1 TD, LG of 41	Wake Forest: 287
Marshall Williams: 1/1, 41 YDS, 1 TD	Josh Adams: 5 CAR, 19 YDS, LG of 6	Devon Brown: 6 REC, 76 YDS, LG of 26	Boston College: 298

1st quarter

- 14:28 BC– Montel Harris 26 YD Run (Nate Freese Kick) 0–7
- 00:28 WFU- Jimmy Newman 37 YD FG 3–7

2nd quarter

- 11:37 BC– Montel Harris 3 YD Run (Nate Freese Kick) 3–14
- 02:26 WFU- Jimmy Newman 39 YD FG 6–14

3rd quarter

- 12:04 BC– Montel Harris 1 YD Run (Kick Blocked) 6–20

4th quarter

- 09:20 WFU- Chris Givens 41 YD Pass from Marshall Williams (Jimmy Newman Kick) 13–20
- 03:54 BC- Nate Freese 25 YD FG 13–23

=== North Carolina State ===
	1	2	3	4	Total
Wake Forest	0	3	0	0	3
NC State	3	7	14	14	38

104th meeting. 36–61–6 all time. Last meeting 2009, 30–24 Demon Deacons in Winston-Salem.

NC State broke open the game with 28 unanswered points in the second half. Russell Wilson had two touchdown passes as well as two on the ground to lead the Wolfpack to a lopsided win over the Deacons. Wake Forest got its sole points on a Jimmy Newman field goal. Michael Campanaro led the team in both rushing and receiving yards for the Demon Deacons.

Passing Leaders	Rushing Leaders	Receiving Leaders	Total Yards
Tanner Price: 9/11, 69 YDS	Michael Campanaro: 19 CAR, 67 YDS, LG of 18	Michael Campanaro: 1 REC, 18 YDS, LG of 18	Wake Forest: 188
Skylar Jones: 1/2, 9 YDS	Josh Adams: 10 CAR, 39 YDS, LG of 15	Chris Givens: 3 REC, 17 YDS, LG of 9	NC State: 387

1st quarter

- 05:42 NCST- Chris Hawthorne 25 YD FG 0–3

2nd quarter

- 12:35 WFU- Jimmy Newman 19 YD FG 3–3
- 07:47 NCST– Jarvis Williams 4 YD Pass from Russell Wilson (Chris Hawthorne Kick) 3–10

3rd quarter

- 12:50 NCST– Owen Spencer 38 YD Pass from Russell Wilson (Chris Hawthorne Kick) 3–17
- 06:25 NCST– Russell Wilson 2 YD Run (Chris Hawthorne Kick) 3–24

4th quarter

- 12:56 NCST– Russell Wilson 1 YD Run (Chris Hawthorne Kick) 3–31
- 07:42 NCST– James Washington 1 YD Run (Chris Hawthorne Kick) 3–38

=== Clemson ===
	1	2	3	4	Total
Clemson	3	10	7	10	30
Wake Forest	0	0	0	10	10

76th meeting. 17–57–1 all time. Last meeting 2009, 38–3 Tigers in Clemson.

Wake Forest's losing streak reached 9 with a 30–10 loss to Clemson on Senior Day in Winston-Salem. Jamie Harper had 142 yards rushing and a 63-yard touchdown. Wake Forest could only manage 205 yards of offense against the Tigers. The lone Wake touchdown was a Josh Harris 4th quarter touchdown run.

Passing Leaders	Rushing Leaders	Receiving Leaders	Total Yards
Tanner Price: 17/30, 151 YDS	Josh Harris: 9 CAR, 38 YDS, 1 TD, LG of 9	Marshall Williams: 4 REC, 48 YDS, LG of 22	Wake Forest: 205
Chris Givens: 0/1	Josh Adams: 7 CAR, 8 YDS, LG of 6	Cameron Ford: 2 REC, 36 YDS, LG of 34	Boston College: 413

1st quarter

- 10:44 CLM- Chandler Catanzaro 43 YD FG 0–3

2nd quarter

- 08:06 CLM- Chandler Catanzaro 22 YD FG 0–6
- 00:46 CLM- Jaron Brown 40 YD Pass from Kyle Parker (Chandler Catanzaro Kick) 0–13

3rd quarter

- 00:46 CLM- DeAndre Hopkins 2 YD Pass from Kyle Parker (Chandler Catanzaro Kick) 0–20

4th quarter

- 13:52 CLM- Chandler Catanzaro 32 YD FG 0–23
- 08:38 WFU- Jimmy Newman 45 YD FG 3–23
- 08:19 CLM- Jamie Harper 63 YD Run (Chandler Catanzaro Kick) 3–30
- 06:02 WFU– Josh Harris 1 YD Run (Jimmy Newman Kick) 10–30

=== Vanderbilt ===
	1	2	3	4	Total
Wake Forest	10	14	3	7	34
Vanderbilt	3	3	0	7	13

13th meeting. 5–7 all time. Last meeting 2008, 23–10 Demon Deacons in Winston-Salem.

Wake Forest ended their season snapping their nine-game losing streak with a big win in Nashville. Josh Harris led the way with 138 yards rushing and was one of four Demon Deacons to record rushing touchdowns. Josh Adams scored on an eleven-yard run in his last collegiate game. Tanner Price and Chris Givens also scored for Wake Forest. The Deacons ended their season at 3–9.

Passing Leaders	Rushing Leaders	Receiving Leaders	Total Yards
Tanner Price: 10/14, 73 YDS	Josh Harris: 18 CAR, 138 YDS, 1TD, LG of 74	Devon Brown: 4 REC, 37 YDS, LG of 14	Wake Forest: 299
	Josh Adams: 11 CAR, 42 YDS, 1 TD, LG of 11	Marshall Williams: 2 REC, 12 YDS, LG of 7	Vanderbilt: 443

1st quarter

- 11:46 VAN- Ryan Fowler 31 YD FG 0–3
- 09:07 WFU– Josh Harris 15 YD Run (Jimmy Newman Kick) 7–3
- 05:12 WFU- Jimmy Newman 32 YD FG 10–3

2nd quarter

- 10:09 WFU– Josh Adams 11 YD Run (Jimmy Newman Kick) 17–3
- 02:28 WFU– Tanner Price 4 YD Run (Jimmy Newman Kick) 24–3
- 00:09 VAN- Ryan Fowler 31 YD FG 24–6

3rd quarter

- 05:17 WFU- Jimmy Newman 36 YD FG 27–6

4th quarter

- 14:47 WFU– Chris Givens 9 YD Run (Jimmy Newman Kick) 34–6
- 12:26 VAN– Jordan Matthews 17 YD Pass from Jared Funk (Ryan Fowler Kick) 34–13

== Statistics ==
=== Scores by quarter ===
	1	2	3	4	Total
Wake Forest	72	89	46	66	273
Opponents	85	147	95	103	430

=== Offense ===
==== Rushing ====
Name	GP	Att	Yards	Avg	TD	Long	Avg/G
Josh Harris	11	126	720	5.7	7	87	65.5
Josh Adams	12	91	316	3.5	3	57	26.3
Ted Stachitas	5	35	171	4.9	2	34	34.2
Devon Brown	12	18	134	7.4	2	85	11.2
Michael Campanaro	12	29	123	4.2	1	22	10.2
Tanner Price	11	75	120	1.6	4	28	10.9
Brandon Pendergrass	6	24	115	4.8	2	16	19.2
Tommy Bohanon	12	17	77	4.5	0	22	6.4
Chris Givens	11	16	63	3.9	2	22	5.7
Skylar Jones	5	12	41	3.4	0	16	8.2
Brendan Cross	4	9	31	3.4	0	11	7.8
Willie Dixon	2	1	1	1.0	0	1	0.6
TEAM	9	7	−10	−1.4	0	0	−1.1
Demon Deacons Total	12	460	1,902	4.1	23	87	158.5
Opponents	12	491	2,310	4.7	24	63	192.5

==== Passing ====
Name	GP	Cmp–Att	Pct	Yds	TD	INT	Lng	Avg/G	RAT
Tanner Price	11	137–241	56.8	1,349	7	8	78	122.6	106.81
Skylar Jones	5	13–27	48.1	14	0	1	26	23.8	77.76
Ted Stachitas	5	12–23	52.2	131	0	1	33	26.2	91.32
Brendan Cross	4	2–7	28.6	5	0	0	3	1.2	34.57
Marshall Williams	12	2–3	66.7	122	2	0	81	10.2	628.27
Chris Givens	11	0–1	0.0	0	0	0	0	0.0	0.00
Demon Deacons Total	12	166–302	55.0	1,726	9	10	81	143.8	106.19
Opponents	12	241–393	61.3	2,858	29	11	70	238.2	141.16

==== Receiving ====
Name	GP	Rec	Yds	Avg	TD	Long	Avg/G
Devon Brown	12	39	302	7.7	1	26	25.2
Chris Givens	11	35	514	14.7	4	81	46.7
Marshall Williams	12	24	272	11.3	2	38	22.7
Cameron Ford	12	11	120	10.9	0	34	10.0
Tommy Bohanon	12	11	75	6.8	0	11	6.2
Michael Campanaro	12	10	107	10.7	0	22	8.9
Danny Dembry	12	8	106	13.2	1	23	8.8
Josh Harris	11	8	69	8.6	0	15	6.3
Josh Adams	12	7	61	8.7	0	17	5.1
Andrew Parker	12	6	37	6.2	0	9	3.1
Terence Davis	10	4	20	5.0	1	8	2.0
Brandon Pendergrass	6	2	20	10.0	0	19	3.3
Jordan Williams	4	1	23	23.0	0	23	5.8
Demon Deacons Total	12	166	1,726	10.4	9	81	143.8
Opponents	12	241	2,858	11.9	29	70	238.2

==== Scoring ====
Name	TD	FG	PAT	2PT PAT	SAFETY	TOT PTS
Jimmy Newman		12–13	31–31			67
Chris Givens	7					42
Josh Harris	7					42
Tanner Price	4					24
Devon Brown	3					18
Josh Adams	3					18
Brandon Pendergrass	2					12
Ted Stachitas	2					12
Marshall Williams	2					12
Terence Davis	1					6
Danny Dembry	1					6
Alex Frye	1					6
Michael Campanaro	1					6
Kenny Okoro				1		2
Demon Deacons Total	34	12–13	31–31	1		273
Opponents	55	16–20	50–54	1		430
