= 2010 NC State Wolfpack football team =

American college football season

2010 NC State Wolfpack football

Champs Sports Bowl champion

Champs Sports Bowl, W 23–7 vs. West Virginia
- Conference: Atlantic Coast Conference
- Atlantic Division

Ranking
- Coaches: No. 25
- AP: No. 25
- Record: 9–4 (5–3 ACC)
- Head coach: Tom O'Brien (4th season)
- Offensive coordinator: Dana Bible (4th season)
- Offensive scheme: Pro-style
- Defensive coordinator: Mike Archer (4th season)
- Base defense: 4–3
- Home stadium: Carter–Finley Stadium

2010 Atlantic Coast Conference football standings
	Conf.			Overall
Team	W		L	W		L
Atlantic Division
No. 17 Florida State x	6	–	2	10	–	4
No. 23 Maryland	5	–	3	9	–	4
No. 25 NC State	5	–	3	9	–	4
Boston College	4	–	4	7	–	6
Clemson	4	–	4	6	–	7
Wake Forest	1	–	7	3	–	9
Coastal Division
No. 16 Virginia Tech x$	8	–	0	11	–	3
Miami (FL)	5	–	3	7	–	6
Georgia Tech	4	–	4	6	–	7
North Carolina	4	–	4	8	–	5
Duke	1	–	7	3	–	9
Virginia	1	–	7	4	–	8
Championship: Virginia Tech 44, Florida State 33
$ – BCS representative as conference champion; x – Division champion/co-champions; Rankings from AP Poll

The 2010 NC State Wolfpack Football Team represented North Carolina State University in the 2010 NCAA Division I FBS football season. The Wolfpack, led by head coach Tom O'Brien, played their home games at Carter–Finley Stadium in Raleigh, North Carolina and were members of the Atlantic division of the Atlantic Coast Conference. They finished the season 9–4, 5–3 in ACC play. They were invited to the Champ Sports Bowl where they defeated West Virginia, 23–7.

== Schedule ==
Date	Time	Opponent	Rank	Site	TV	Result	Attendance	Source
September 4	6:00 pm	Western Carolina*		Carter–Finley Stadium; Raleigh, NC	ESPN3	W 48–7	56,417	
September 11	7:30 pm	at UCF*		Bright House Networks Stadium; Orlando, FL	CBSCS	W 28–21	43,020	
September 16	7:30 pm	Cincinnati*		Carter–Finley Stadium; Raleigh, NC	ESPN	W 30–19	55,934	
September 25	12:00 pm	at Georgia Tech		Bobby Dodd Stadium; Atlanta, GA	ESPN	W 45–28	48,825	
October 2	3:30 pm	Virginia Tech	No. 23	Carter–Finley Stadium; Raleigh, NC	ABC	L 30–41	58,083	
October 9	12:00 pm	Boston College		Carter–Finley Stadium; Raleigh, NC	ACCN	W 44–17	56,859	
October 16	12:00 pm	at East Carolina*		Dowdy–Ficklen Stadium; Greenville, NC (rivalry)	CBSCS	L 27–33 ^{OT}	50,410	
October 28	7:30 pm	No. 16 Florida State		Carter–Finley Stadium; Raleigh, NC	ESPN	W 28–24	56,807	
November 6	12:00 pm	at Clemson	No. 23	Memorial Stadium; Clemson, SC (Textile Bowl)	ACCN	L 13–14	75,906	
November 13	2:00 pm	Wake Forest^{†}		Carter–Finley Stadium; Raleigh, NC (rivalry)	ESPN3	W 38–3	57,161	
November 20	12:00 pm	at North Carolina		Kenan Stadium; Chapel Hill, NC (rivalry)	ACCN	W 29–25	60,000	
November 27	3:30 pm	at Maryland	No. 21	Byrd Stadium; College Park, MD	ESPN2	L 31–38	35,370	
December 28	6:30 pm	No. 22 West Virginia*		Florida Citrus Bowl; Orlando, FL (Champs Sports Bowl)	ESPN	W 23–7	48,962	
*Non-conference game; ^{†}Homecoming; Rankings from AP Poll released prior to the game; All times are in Eastern time
