= 2010 Boston College Eagles football team =

American college football season

2010 Boston College Eagles football
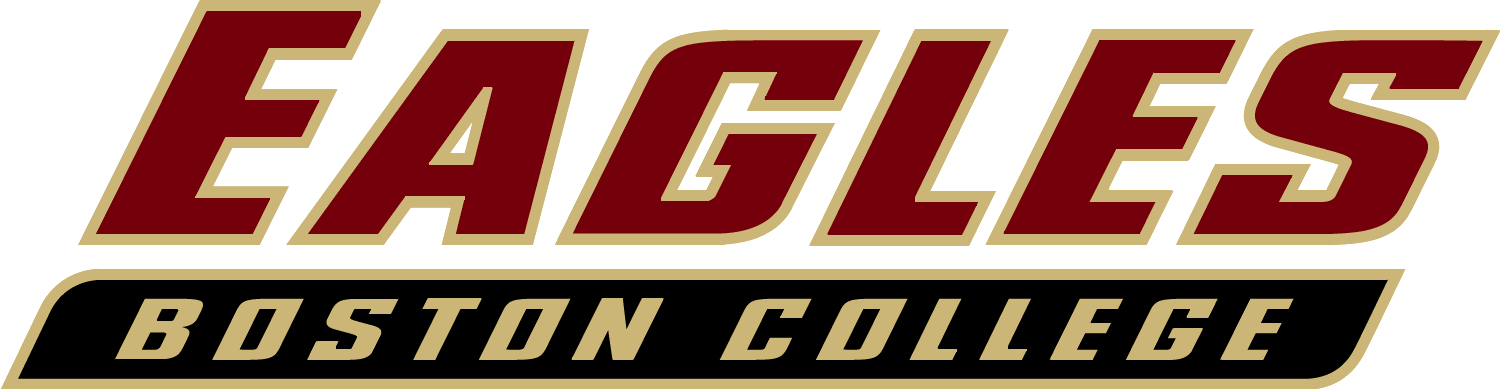

Kraft Fight Hunger Bowl, L 13–20 vs. Nevada
- Conference: Atlantic Coast Conference
- Atlantic Division
- Record: 7–6 (4–4 ACC)
- Head coach: Frank Spaziani (2nd season)
- Offensive coordinator: Gary Tranquill (2nd season)
- Offensive scheme: Pro-style
- Defensive coordinator: Bill McGovern (2nd season)
- Base defense: 4–3
- Captains: Alex Albright; Anthony Castonzo; Wes Davis; James McCluskey
- Home stadium: Alumni Stadium

2010 Atlantic Coast Conference football standings
	Conf.			Overall
Team	W		L	W		L
Atlantic Division
No. 17 Florida State x	6	–	2	10	–	4
No. 23 Maryland	5	–	3	9	–	4
No. 25 NC State	5	–	3	9	–	4
Boston College	4	–	4	7	–	6
Clemson	4	–	4	6	–	7
Wake Forest	1	–	7	3	–	9
Coastal Division
No. 16 Virginia Tech x$	8	–	0	11	–	3
Miami (FL)	5	–	3	7	–	6
Georgia Tech	4	–	4	6	–	7
North Carolina	4	–	4	8	–	5
Duke	1	–	7	3	–	9
Virginia	1	–	7	4	–	8
Championship: Virginia Tech 44, Florida State 33
$ – BCS representative as conference champion; x – Division champion/co-champions; Rankings from AP Poll

The 2010 Boston College Eagles football team represented Boston College in the 2010 NCAA Division I FBS football season. The Eagles were led by second-year head coach Frank Spaziani and played their home games at Alumni Stadium in Chestnut Hill, Massachusetts. They were members of the Atlantic Coast Conference (ACC) in the Atlantic Division and were invited to Kraft Fight Hunger Bowl, where they lost to Nevada, 20–13. They finished the season 7–6 overall and 4–4 in ACC play.

== Schedule ==
Date	Time	Opponent	Site	TV	Result	Attendance
September 4	1:00 p.m.	Weber State*	Alumni Stadium; Chestnut Hill, MA	ESPN3	W 38–20	34,168
September 11	3:30 p.m.	Kent State*	Alumni Stadium; Chestnut Hill, MA	ESPNU	W 26–13	35,122
September 25	12:00 p.m.	Virginia Tech	Alumni Stadium; Chestnut Hill, MA (rivalry)	ACCN	L 0–19	42,317
October 2	8:00 p.m.	Notre Dame*	Alumni Stadium; Chestnut Hill, MA (Holy War)	ABC	L 13–31	44,500
October 9	12:00 p.m.	at NC State	Carter–Finley Stadium; Raleigh, NC	ACCN	L 17–44	56,859
October 16	12:00 p.m.	at No. 17 Florida State	Doak Campbell Stadium; Tallahassee, FL	ESPN	L 19–24	75,301
October 23	1:00 p.m.	Maryland	Alumni Stadium; Chestnut Hill, MA	ESPN3	L 21–24	36,078
October 30	12:00 p.m.	Clemson	Alumni Stadium; Chestnut Hill, MA (O'Rourke–McFadden Trophy)	ACCN	W 16–10	37,137
November 6	3:30 p.m.	at Wake Forest	BB&T Field; Winston-Salem, NC	ESPN3	W 23–13	29,465
November 13	12:00 p.m.	at Duke	Wallace Wade Stadium; Durham, NC	ESPN3	W 21–16	21,420
November 20	12:00 p.m.	Virginia	Alumni Stadium; Chestnut Hill, MA	ESPNU	W 17–13	39,263
November 27	12:00 p.m.	at Syracuse*	Carrier Dome; Syracuse, NY	ESPN	W 16–7	42,191
January 9, 2011	9:00 p.m.	vs. No. 15 Nevada*	AT&T Park; San Francisco, CA (Kraft Fight Hunger Bowl)	ESPN	L 13–20	41,063
*Non-conference game; Rankings from Coaches Poll released prior to the game; All times are in Eastern time

== 2011 NFL draftees ==
Player	Round	Pick	Position	NFL club
Anthony Castonzo	1	22	Offensive tackle	Indianapolis Colts
