= 2010 Duke Blue Devils football team =

American college football season

2010 Duke Blue Devils football
- Conference: Atlantic Coast Conference
- Coastal Division
- Record: 3–9 (1–7 ACC)
- Head coach: David Cutcliffe (3rd season)
- Offensive coordinator: Kurt Roper (3rd season)
- Offensive scheme: Multiple
- Defensive coordinator: Jim Knowles (1st season)
- Base defense: Multiple
- MVP: Sean Renfree
- Captains: Abraham Kromah; Bryan Morgan; Chris Rwabukamba
- Home stadium: Wallace Wade Stadium

2010 Atlantic Coast Conference football standings
	Conf.			Overall
Team	W		L	W		L
Atlantic Division
No. 17 Florida State x	6	–	2	10	–	4
No. 23 Maryland	5	–	3	9	–	4
No. 25 NC State	5	–	3	9	–	4
Boston College	4	–	4	7	–	6
Clemson	4	–	4	6	–	7
Wake Forest	1	–	7	3	–	9
Coastal Division
No. 16 Virginia Tech x$	8	–	0	11	–	3
Miami (FL)	5	–	3	7	–	6
Georgia Tech	4	–	4	6	–	7
North Carolina	4	–	4	8	–	5
Duke	1	–	7	3	–	9
Virginia	1	–	7	4	–	8
Championship: Virginia Tech 44, Florida State 33
$ – BCS representative as conference champion; x – Division champion/co-champions; Rankings from AP Poll

The 2010 Duke Blue Devils football team represented Duke University in the 2010 NCAA Division I FBS football season as members of the Atlantic Coast Conference (ACC) in the Coastal Division. The Blue Devils were led by third-year head coach David Cutcliffe and played their home games at Wallace Wade Stadium. Duke finished the season 3–9 overall and 1–7 in ACC play.

== Schedule ==
Date	Time	Opponent	Site	TV	Result	Attendance
September 4	7:00 pm	No. 7 (FCS) Elon*	Wallace Wade Stadium; Durham, NC	ESPN3	W 41–27	33,941
September 11	12:00 pm	at Wake Forest	BB&T Field; Winston-Salem, NC (rivalry)	ACCN	L 48–54	31,673
September 18	3:30 pm	No. 1 Alabama*	Wallace Wade Stadium; Durham, NC	ABC	L 13–62	39,042
September 25	3:00 pm	Army*^{†}	Wallace Wade Stadium; Durham, NC	ESPN3	L 21–35	27,289
October 2	6:00 pm	at Maryland	Byrd Stadium; College Park, MD	ESPN3	L 16–21	39,106
October 16	1:00 pm	Miami (FL)	Wallace Wade Stadium; Durham, NC	ESPN3	L 13–28	25,911
October 23	12:00 pm	at No. 23 Virginia Tech	Lane Stadium; Blacksburg, VA	ACCN	L 7–44	66,233
October 30	3:30 pm	at Navy*	Navy–Marine Corps Memorial Stadium; Annapolis, MD	CBSCS	W 34–31	34,117
November 6	12:00 pm	Virginia	Wallace Wade Stadium; Durham, NC	ESPN3	W 55–48	22,741
November 13	12:00 pm	Boston College	Wallace Wade Stadium; Durham, NC	ESPN3	L 16–21	21,420
November 20	1:30 pm	at Georgia Tech	Bobby Dodd Stadium; Atlanta, GA	ESPN3	L 20–30	42,110
November 27	3:30 pm	North Carolina	Wallace Wade Stadium; Durham, NC (Victory Bell)	ESPNU	L 19–24	30,904
*Non-conference game; ^{†}Homecoming; Rankings from Coaches Poll released prior to the game; All times are in Eastern time

== Game summaries ==
=== Elon ===
	1	2	3	4	Total
Phoenix	3	10	0	14	27
Blue Devils	14	13	0	14	41

=== At Wake Forest ===
	1	2	3	4	Total
Blue Devils	14	21	3	10	48
Demon Deacons	7	28	6	13	54

=== No. 1 Alabama ===
	1	2	3	4	Total
No. 1 Crimson Tide	28	17	10	7	62
Blue Devils	3	10	0	0	13

=== Army ===
	1	2	3	4	Total
Black Knights	14	7	14	0	35
Blue Devils	7	0	0	14	21

=== At Maryland ===
	1	2	3	4	Total
Blue Devils	3	6	0	7	16
Terrapins	0	7	7	7	21

=== Miami (FL) ===
	1	2	3	4	Total
Hurricanes	0	14	14	0	28
Blue Devils	3	0	7	3	13

=== At No. 23 Virginia Tech ===
	1	2	3	4	Total
Blue Devils	0	0	7	0	7
No. 23 Hokies	14	13	17	0	44

=== At Navy ===
	1	2	3	4	Total
Blue Devils	3	21	7	3	34
Midshipmen	0	0	7	24	31

=== Virginia ===
	1	2	3	4	Total
Cavaliers	7	14	7	20	48
Blue Devils	21	3	10	21	55

=== Boston College ===
	1	2	3	4	Total
Eagles	0	7	14	0	21
Blue Devils	3	3	3	7	16

=== At Georgia Tech ===
	1	2	3	4	Total
Blue Devils	3	10	0	7	20
Yellow Jackets	3	3	17	7	30

=== North Carolina ===
	1	2	3	4	Total
Tar Heels	7	3	7	7	24
Blue Devils	7	0	3	9	19
