= 2010 Navy Midshipmen football team =

American college football season

2010 Navy Midshipmen football
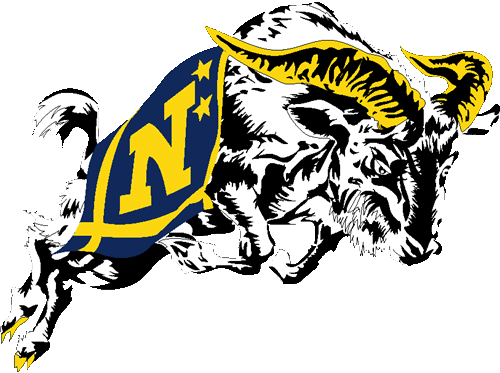

Poinsettia Bowl, L 14–35 vs. San Diego State
- Conference: Independent
- Record: 9–4
- Head coach: Ken Niumatalolo (3rd season)
- Offensive coordinator: Ivin Jasper (3rd season)
- Offensive scheme: Triple option
- Defensive coordinator: Buddy Green (9th season)
- Base defense: Multiple
- MVP: Greg Jones
- Captains: Ricky Dobbs; Wyatt Middleton
- Home stadium: Navy–Marine Corps Memorial Stadium

2010 NCAA Division I FBS independents football records
	Conf.			Overall
Team	W		L	W		L
Navy		–		9	–	4
Notre Dame		–		8	–	5
Army		–		7	–	6
Rankings from AP Poll

The 2010 Navy Midshipmen football team represented the United States Naval Academy as an independent during the 2010 NCAA Division I FBS football season. The Midshipmen, led by third-year head coach Ken Niumatalolo, played their home games at the Navy–Marine Corps Memorial Stadium.

Navy earned an invitation to the 2010 Poinsettia Bowl on November 7, becoming the second team in the Football Bowl Subdivision to earn a bowl berth for the 2010 season. Navy was guaranteed a spot in the game if they became bowl eligible (won 6 games or more) as part of an agreement between the Naval Academy and the Poinsettia Bowl. San Diego State defeated Navy in the Poinsettia Bowl, 35–14. The Midshipmen finished with a record of 9–4.

== Schedule ==
Date	Time	Opponent	Site	TV	Result	Attendance	Source
September 6	4:00 p.m.	vs. Maryland	M&T Bank Stadium; Baltimore, MD (Crab Bowl Classic)	ESPN	L 14–17	69,348	
September 11	3:30 p.m.	Georgia Southern	Navy–Marine Corps Memorial Stadium; Annapolis, MD	CBSCS	W 13–7	33,391	
September 18	7:00 p.m.	at Louisiana Tech	Joe Aillet Stadium; Ruston, LA	ESPN3	W 37–23	23,122	
October 2	2:30 p.m.	at Air Force	Falcon Stadium; Colorado Springs, CO (Commander-in-Chief's Trophy)	Versus	L 6–14	47,565	
October 9	6:30 p.m.	at Wake Forest	BB&T Field; Winston-Salem, NC	ESPN3	W 28–27	31,454	
October 16	3:30 p.m.	SMU	Navy–Marine Corps Memorial Stadium; Annapolis, MD (Gansz Trophy)	CBSCS	W 28–21	33,924	
October 23	12:00 p.m.	vs. Notre Dame	New Meadowlands Stadium; East Rutherford, NJ (rivalry)	CBS	W 35–17	75,614	
October 30	3:30 p.m.	Duke	Navy–Marine Corps Memorial Stadium; Annapolis, MD	CBSCS	L 31–34	34,117	
November 6	3:30 p.m.	at East Carolina	Dowdy–Ficklen Stadium; Greenville, NC	MASN	W 76–35	50,191	
November 13	3:30 p.m.	Central Michigan	Navy–Marine Corps Memorial Stadium; Annapolis, MD	CBSCS	W 38–37	34,333	
November 20	3:30 p.m.	Arkansas State	Navy–Marine Corps Memorial Stadium; Annapolis, MD	CBSCS	W 35–19	27,501	
December 11	2:30 p.m.	vs. Army	Lincoln Financial Field; Philadelphia, PA (Army–Navy Game)	CBS	W 31–17	69,223	
December 23	8:00 p.m.	at San Diego State	Qualcomm Stadium; San Diego, CA (Poinsettia Bowl)	ESPN	L 14–35	48,049	
All times are in Eastern time

== Preseason ==
*Slotback Marcus Curry was dismissed from the team in May and soon left the academy.[14]

- Wide receiver Mario Washington was dismissed from the team in June due to an honor violation.

== Game summaries ==
=== Air Force ===
Wyatt Middleton called a team meeting following the loss.

=== Notre Dame ===
Team	1	2	3	4	Total
Notre Dame	3	7	0	7	17
• Navy	7	14	14	0	35

- Date: October 23
- Location: New Meadowlands Stadium, East Rutherford, New Jersey
- Game start: 12:00 p.m.
- Source: ESPN.com

Scoring summary
1	6:05	NAVY	Alexander Teich 31-yard pass from Ricky Dobbs (Jon Teague kick)	Navy 7-0
1	3:04	ND	David Ruffer 45-yard field goal	Navy 7-3
2	11:01	NAVY	Ricky Dobbs 3-yard run (Jon Teague kick)	Navy 14-3
2	6:07	ND	TJ Jones 16-yard pass from Dayne Crist (David Ruffer kick)	Navy 14-10
2	:14	NAVY	Gee Gee Greene 9-yard run (Jon Teague kick)	Navy 21-10
3	11:23	NAVY	Ricky Dobbs 9-yard run (Jon Teague kick)	Navy 28-10
3	4:38	NAVY	Ricky Dobbs 1-yard run (Jon Teague kick)	Navy 35-10
4	6:12	ND	Cierre Wood 1-yard run (David Ruffer kick)	Navy 35-17

=== East Carolina ===
Navy clinched a berth in the Poinsettia Bowl with the win.

=== Arkansas State ===
Senior Day

=== Army ===
Quarter	1	2	3	4	Total
Navy	10	14	0	7	31
Army	0	7	3	7	17

at Lincoln Financial Field, Philadelphia

- Date: December 11
- Game time: 2:30 p.m. EST
- Game weather: partly sunny, 45 °F (7 °C)
- Game attendance: 69,223
- Referee: Dennis Hennigan
- TV announcers (CBS): Verne Lundquist, Gary Danielson and Tracy Wolfson
- Recap

Game information

1st quarter

- NAVY: Joe Buckley 34-yard field goal, 11:57
- NAVY: John Howell 77-yard pass from Ricky Dobbs (Joe Buckley kick), 8:44

2nd quarter

- NAVY: Brandon Turner 42-yard pass from Ricky Dobbs (Joe Buckley kick), 13:44
- ARMY: Malcolm Brown 5-yard pass from Trent Steelman (Alex Carlton kick), 8:19
- NAVY: Wyatt Middleton 98-yard fumble return (Joe Buckley kick), 1:03

3rd quarter

- ARMY: Alex Carlton 42-yard field goal, 8:08

4th quarter

- NAVY: Gee Gee Greene 25-yard rush (Joe Buckley kick), 5:44
- ARMY: Malcolm Brown 45-yard pass from Trent Steelman (Alex Carlton kick), 4:05

Passing

- NAVY: Ricky Dobbs 6/11, 186 yards, INT
- ARMY: Trent Steelman 11/20, 128 yards

Rushing

- NAVY: Ricky Dobbs 20–54, Alexander Teich 11–47, Gee Gee Greene 5–35, Aaron Santiago 1–5
- ARMY: Trent Steelman 19–74, Raymond Maples 13–66, Jared Hassin 15–50, Patrick Mealy 4–14, Malcolm Brown 2–4, Brian Cobbs 1–1

Receiving

- NAVY: John Howell 1–77, Aaron Santiago 2–54, Brandon Turner 1–32, Greg Jones 2–23
- ARMY: Malcolm Brown 3–59, George Jordan 3–21, Davyd Brooks 2–19, Austin Barr 1–13, Jared Hassin 1–10, Patrick Mealy 1–6

Navy's ninth straight win versus Army

== Personnel ==
=== Roster ===
2010 Navy Midshipmen football team roster
Players
Coaches
Offense

Pos.	#	Name	Class
WR	85	Matt Aiken
WR	48	Bruce Andrews
G	69	Francis Archibald
G	67	Andrew Baker
OT	64	Ryan Basford
OT	61	Jeff Battipaglia
FB	43	Austin Beaty
G	62	Alex Boddiford
WR	10	Casey Bolena
OT	78	Donnie Bowers
WR	11	Hal Bowron
G	72	Travis Bridges
OT	58	Dallas Butts	So
SB	20	Andre Byrd
OT	52	John Cabbage
G	65	Josh Cabral
OT	59	Evan Campbell
FB	25	Prentice Christian
FB	22	Dylan Chynoweth
SB	41	J.J. Cosh
G	63	Matt Couch
QB	7	Jarvis Cummings
G	75	Brady DeMell
FB	37	Delvin Diggs
QB	4	Ricky Dobbs	Sr
C	71	Eric Douglass
G	68	John Dowd
G	79	Zach Dryden
FB	32	Kevin Eckel
WR	82	Doug Furman
WR	89	Jonathan Gazaille
G	57	Adam Geuss
SB	21	Gee Gee Greene
G	77	Beau Haworth
WR	19	Darin Hess
SB	3	Ryan Hill
WR	42	Brantley Horton
SB	33	John Howell
WR	84	Greg Jones
SB	28	Walt Jones
QB	14	Travis Keating
FB	44	Ron Lombardo
WR	87	Shawn Lynch
QB	8	Tyler Lynch
G	56	Eric Mahler
FB	36	John McCauley
QB	6	Trey Miller
OT	70	Matt Molloy
FB	47	Vince Murray
WR	83	Gary Myers
QB	9	Andrew Nerup
SB	29	John O'Boyle
OT	51	Nolan O'Sullivan
SB	13	Mike Patrick
C	60	Kahikolu Pescaia
FB	40	Cody Peterson
QB	2	Kriss Proctor
OT	73	Joe Ryan
SB	26	Aaron Santiago
QB	1	DJ Sargenti
WR	80	Mike Schupp
WR	18	Matt Shibata
SB	23	Bo Snelson
SB	5	Darius Staten
G	53	Thomas Stone
SB	17	Mike Stukel
OT	76	David Sumrall
FB	39	Alexander Teich	Jr
SB	34	Marcus Thomas
WR	86	Brandon Turner
OT	55	Matthew Van Halanger
C	54	Graham Vickers
OT	66	Collin Watkins
SB	46	Brian Williams
OT	50	Sam Womack
SB	24	David Zapata

Defense

Pos.	#	Name	Class
DE	72	Thomas Batchelder
S	5	Brian Blick
ILB	44	Max Blue
NG	95	Shane Bothel
ILB	38	Matt Brewer
NG	93	Chase Burge
S	9	Tra'ves Bush
CB	16	Todd Culver
NG	60	Barry Dabney
DE	92	Jamel Dobbs
DE	56	Neil Doogan
NG	71	Alex Doolittle
DE	59	Josh Dowling-Fitzpatrick
CB	15	Kevin Edwards
CB	17	Albrey Felder
S	13	Jordan Fraser
OLB	50	Brye French
OLB	41	Andrew Glaize
CB	4	Eric Graham
OLB	42	Mason Graham
CB	14	Ryan Green
OLB	58	Trey Grissom
OLB	31	Jerry Hauburger
DE	99	Wes Henderson
ILB	32	Jonathan Hill
ILB	21	Michael Huf
OLB	55	Hal Hunter
DE	73	Joshua Jones
ILB	46	Jake Juriga
LB	36	Brandon Killebrew
ILB	57	Caleb King
DE	75	Drew Kinsella
DE	74	Clayton Lydick
S	23	Hayden Maples
NG	91	Jared Marks
ILB	45	Vinnie Mauro
NG	97	Chris Mayes
S	7	Emmett Merchant
S	8	Wyatt Middleton
CB	11	Kwesi Mitchell
OLB	29	Aaron McCauley
ILB	40	John Michael Nurthen
OLB	47	Evan Palelei
DE	94	Ryan Paulson
LB	35	Derrick Petett
S	1	Dylon Poras
NG	69	Torri Preston
ILB	33	Shawn Reed
OLB	20	Colin Renton
CB	3	De'Von Richardson
S	2	Wave Ryder
OLB	10	Jarred Shannon
ILB	39	Garrett Sherwood
ILB	54	Tyler Simmons
OLB	81	Colten Southworth
CB	28	David Sperry
OLB	34	Eric Stein
DE	67	Andrew Stellato
OLB	49	Collin Sturdivant
ILB	52	Mike Sweeney
DE	98	Jabaree Tuani	Jr
ILB	87	Michael Tuimavave
OLB	53	Craig Veech
ILB	51	Matt Warrick
OLB	48	Keegan Wetzel
CB	25	Jonathan Wev
CB	18	David Wright
S	19	Jason Wright
DE	90	Billy Yarborough	Sr

Special teams

Pos.	#	Name	Class
LS	96	Brian Ackerman
K	16	Joe Buckley
LS	92	Billy Coats
P	35	Kyle Delahooke
K	22	Jerad Fehr
P	81	Justin Haan
K	91	Brynmor Hughes
K	49	Stephen Picchini
K	45	Jon Teague
P	88	John Charles White	Sr

Head coach

- Ken Niumatalolo

Coordinators/assistant coaches

- Chris Culton – Tackles
- Justin Davis – Defensive line
- Joe DuPaix – Slotbacks
- Tony Grantham – Outside linebackers
- Ashley Ingram – Centers/guards
- Ivin Jasper – Offensive coordinator/quarterbacks
- Steve Johns – Inside linebackers/special teams
- Keith Jones – Outside linebackers
- Mike Judge – Fullbacks
- Buddy Green – Defensive coordinator
- Danny O'Rourke – Wide receivers
- Dale Pehrson – Defensive line
- Napoleon Sykes – Secondary

Legend

- (C) Team captain
- (S) Suspended
- (I) Ineligible
- Injured
- Redshirt

Roster
Last update: 2010-12-26

=== Depth chart ===
(prior to bowl game)

Defense

FS
De'Von Richardson
Jordan Fraser
Tra'ves Bush

WLB	ILB	ILB	SLB
Jerry Hauburger	Max Blue	Tyler Simmons	⋅
Collin Sturdivant	Matt Warrick	Matt Warrick	⋅
Mason Graham	Caleb King	Matt Brewer	⋅

ROV
Wyatt Middleton
Jordan Fraser
Tra'ves Bush

CB
Kwesi Mitchell
David Wright
David Sperry

DE	NT	DE
Billy Yarborough	Chase Burge	Jabaree Tuani
Joshua Jones	Shane Bothel	Josh Dowling-Fitzpatrick
Ryan Paulson	Jared Marks	Wes Henderson

CB
Kevin Edwards
David Sperry
Ryan Green

Offense

WR
Brandon Turner
Matt Aiken
Gary Myers

SB
Gee Gee Greene
John Howell
Andre Byrd

LT	LG	C	RG	RT
Jeff Battipaglia	Josh Cabral	Brady DeMell	John Dowd	Ryan Basford
John Dowd	Travis Bridges	Kahiklou Pescaia	Zach Dryden	David Sumrall
David Sumrall	Eric Douglass	Eric Douglass	Eric Douglass	John Dowd

SB
Aaron Santiago
Bo Snelson
Mike Stukel

WR
Greg Jones
Doug Furman
Jonathon Gazaille

QB
Ricky Dobbs
Kriss Proctor
Trey Miller

FB
Alexander Teich
Vince Murray
Delvin Diggs

Special teams
PK Joe Buckley
PK Jon Teague
P Kyle Delahooke
P Justin Haan
KR Marcus Thomas
PR Gary Myers
LS Brian Ackerman
H Justin Haan
