= 2013 Baltimore Ravens season =

18th US team football season

- Owner: Steve Bisciotti
- General manager: Ozzie Newsome
- Head coach: John Harbaugh
- Offensive coordinator: Jim Caldwell
- Defensive coordinator: Dean Pees
- Home stadium: M&T Bank Stadium

Results
- Record: 8–8
- Division place: 3rd AFC North
- Playoffs: Did not qualify
- Pro Bowlers: G Marshal Yanda; DT Haloti Ngata; OLB Terrell Suggs; K Justin Tucker

Uniform
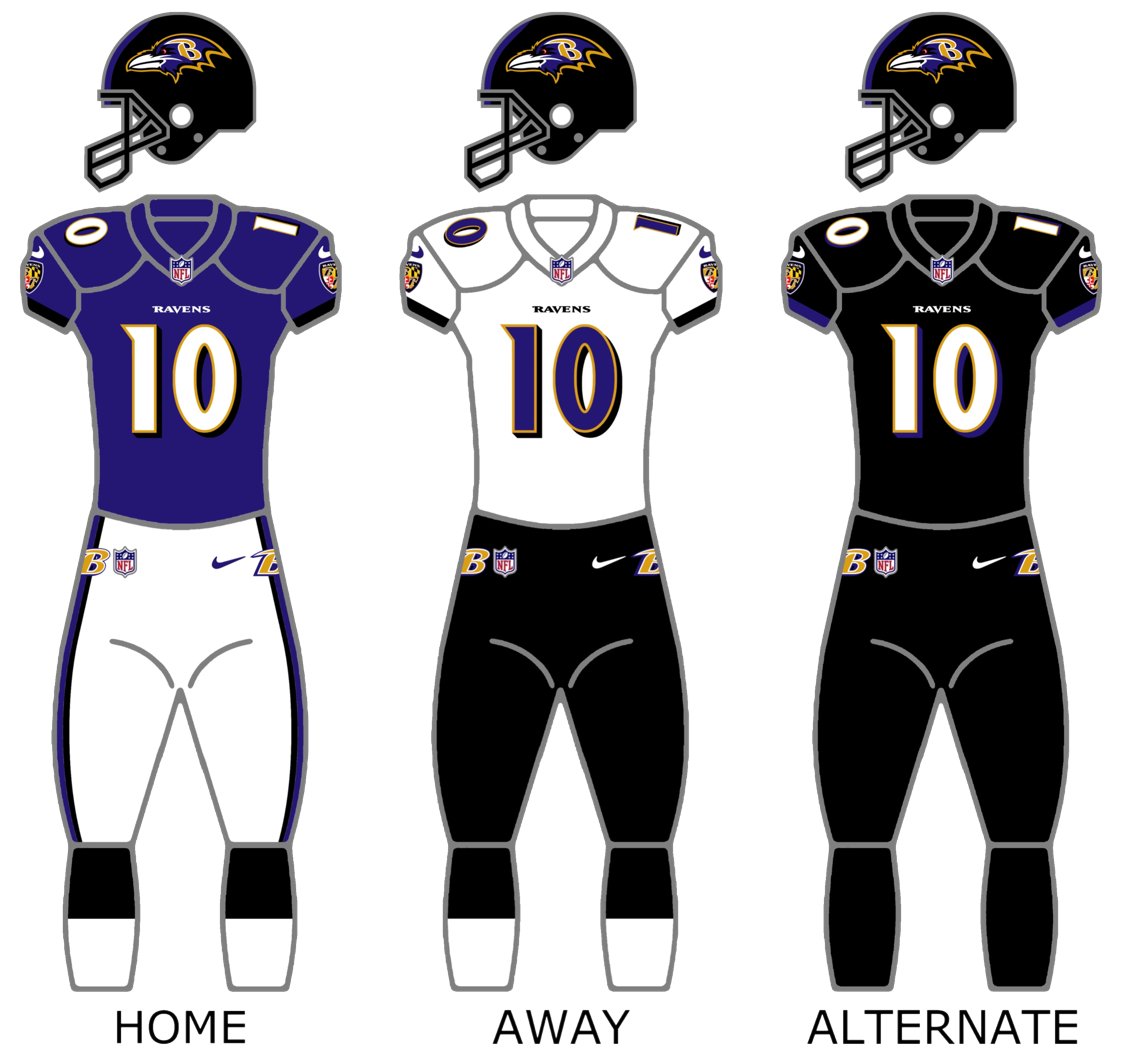

The 2013 season was the Baltimore Ravens' 18th in the National Football League (NFL) and their sixth under head coach John Harbaugh. The Ravens entered the season as the defending Super Bowl champions from the previous year, but failed to improve on their 10–6 record from 2012, and missed the playoffs for the first time since 2007 and for the first time in the Harbaugh/Flacco era. This marked the first time in 10 years, as well as the most recent time, that the defending Super Bowl champion missed the playoffs in back-to-back seasons.

For the first time in franchise history, Ray Lewis was not on the roster, as he announced his retirement before the playoffs began the year prior. He retired as a champion of Super Bowl XLVII and was the last remaining player from the team's inaugural season. Lewis also helped the Ravens win Super Bowl XXXV over the New York Giants and was believed by many to be the greatest Baltimore Raven of all time. Including Lewis, the team parted ways with a record eight starters from the Super Bowl-winning squad; no other defending Super Bowl champion had lost more than five. This would be the last time the Ravens played on Thanksgiving until 2025. They were originally scheduled to play on Thanksgiving in 2020, but the game was postponed due to a COVID-19 outbreak.

== 2013 draft class ==
2013 Baltimore Ravens draft
Round	Pick	Player	Position	College	Notes
1	32	Matt Elam	S	Florida	
2	56	Arthur Brown	LB	Kansas State	
3	94	Brandon Williams *	DT	Missouri Southern	
4	129	John Simon	DE	Ohio State	
4	130	Kyle Juszczyk *	FB	Harvard	
5	168	Rick Wagner	OT	Wisconsin	
6	200	Kapron Lewis-Moore	DE	Notre Dame	
6	203	Ryan Jensen *	OT	Colorado State-Pueblo	
7	238	Aaron Mellette	WR	Elon	
7	247	Marc Anthony	CB	California	
Made roster † Pro Football Hall of Fame * Made at least one Pro Bowl during career

Notes

^{^[a]} The Ravens traded their original second- (No. 62 overall) and fifth- (No. 165 overall) round selections, along with one of their sixth-round selections (No. 199 overall; originally acquired in a trade that sent wide receiver Anquan Boldin to the San Francisco 49ers) to the Seattle Seahawks in exchange for the Seahawks' second-round selection (No. 56 overall).
^{^[b]} Compensatory selection.

== Staff ==
2013 Baltimore Ravens staff
Front office: Owner – Steve Bisciotti; President – Dick Cass; general manager/Executive Vice President – Ozzie Newsome; Assistant general manager – Eric DeCosta; Senior vice president of football administration – Pat Moriarty; Director of pro personnel – Vince Newsome; Director of college scouting – Joe Hortiz; Senior personnel assistant – George Kokinis; Assistant director of pro personnel – Chad Alexander; Head coaches: Head coach – John Harbaugh; Assistant to the head coach – Dan Parsons; Offensive coaches: Offensive coordinator – Jim Caldwell; Run Game Coordinator – Juan Castillo; Running backs – Wilbert Montgomery; Wide receivers – Jim Hostler; Tight ends – Wade Harman; Offensive line – Andy Moeller; Assistant offensive line – Todd Washington; Senior offensive assistant – Craig Ver Steeg; Offensive assistant – Jay Harbaugh; Offensive quality control – Jason Brooks	Defensive coaches: Defensive coordinator – Dean Pees; Defensive line – Clarence Brooks; Linebackers – Ted Monachino; Inside linebackers – Don Martindale; Secondary – Teryl Austin; Senior defensive assistant – Steve Spagnuolo; Defensive quality control – Matt Weiss; Defensive coaching assistant – Drew Wilkins; Special teams coaches: Assistant head coach/special teams coordinator – Jerry Rosburg; Assistant special teams – Chris Hewitt; Kicking consultant – Randy Brown; Strength and conditioning: Strength and conditioning – Bob Rogucki; Assistant strength and conditioning – Juney Barnett; Assistant athletic trainer – Kevin Domboski; Assistant athletic trainer – Ron Medlin

== Final roster ==
2013 Baltimore Ravens roster
Quarterbacks (QB): 5 Joe Flacco; 2 Tyrod Taylor; Running backs (RB): 40 Kyle Juszczyk FB; 44 Vonta Leach FB; 30 Bernard Pierce; 27 Ray Rice; 34 Bernard Scott; Wide receivers (WR): 14 Marlon Brown; 17 Tandon Doss; 12 Jacoby Jones; 82 Torrey Smith; 83 Deonte Thompson; Tight ends (TE): 87 Dallas Clark; 84 Ed Dickson; 88 Dennis Pitta	Offensive linemen (OL): 66 Gino Gradkowski C; 77 Ryan Jensen C; 60 Eugene Monroe T; 74 Michael Oher T; 76 Jah Reid G; 68 A. Q. Shipley G; 71 Rick Wagner T; 73 Marshal Yanda G; Defensive linemen (DL): 99 Chris Canty DE; 62 Terrence Cody NT; 97 Arthur Jones DE; 92 Haloti Ngata NT; 93 DeAngelo Tyson DE; 98 Brandon Williams NT	Linebackers (LB): 59 Arthur Brown ILB; 56 Josh Bynes ILB; 58 Elvis Dumervil OLB; 53 Jameel McClain ILB; 50 Albert McClellan OLB; 90 Pernell McPhee OLB; 94 John Simon OLB; 51 Daryl Smith ILB; 55 Terrell Suggs OLB; 91 Courtney Upshaw OLB; Defensive backs (DB): 23 Chykie Brown CB; 31 Omar Brown FS; 26 Matt Elam FS; 24 Corey Graham CB; 32 James Ihedigbo SS; 25 Asa Jackson CB; 41 Anthony Levine SS; 36 Jeromy Miles SS; 22 Jimmy Smith CB; 28 Brynden Trawick FS; 21 Lardarius Webb CB; Special teams (ST): 46 Morgan Cox LS; 4 Sam Koch P; 9 Justin Tucker K	Practice squad: 11 Kamar Aiken WR; 85 Matt Furstenburg TE (IR); 35 Jonas Gray RB; 69 Cody Larsen DE; 70 David Mims T; 86 Nathan Overbay TE; 7 Gerrard Sheppard WR; 3 Nick Stephens QB; 65 Reggie Stephens C; Reserve: 49 D. J. Bryant OLB (IR); 95 Adrian Hamilton OLB (IR); 67 Kapron Lewis-Moore DE (NF-Inj.); 13 Aaron Mellette WR (IR); 72 Kelechi Osemele G (IR); 80 Brandon Stokley WR (IR); Rookies in italics 53 active, 7 reserve, 8 practice squad

== Preseason ==
=== Schedule ===
Week	Date	Opponent	Result	Record	Venue	Recap
1	August 8	at Tampa Bay Buccaneers	W 44–16	1–0	Raymond James Stadium	Recap
2	August 15	Atlanta Falcons	W 27–23	2–0	M&T Bank Stadium	Recap
3	August 22	Carolina Panthers	L 27–34	2–1	M&T Bank Stadium	Recap
4	August 29	at St. Louis Rams	L 21–24	2–2	Edward Jones Dome	Recap

== Regular season ==
=== Schedule ===
Week	Date	Opponent	Result	Record	Venue	Recap
1	September 5	at Denver Broncos	**L** 27–49	0–1	Sports Authority Field at Mile High^{[a]}	Recap
2	September 15	**Cleveland Browns**	**W** 14–6	1–1	M&T Bank Stadium	Recap
3	September 22	Houston Texans	**W** 30–9	2–1	M&T Bank Stadium	Recap
4	September 29	at Buffalo Bills	**L** 20–23	2–2	Ralph Wilson Stadium	Recap
5	October 6	at Miami Dolphins	**W** 26–23	3–2	Sun Life Stadium	Recap
6	October 13	Green Bay Packers	**L** 17–19	3–3	M&T Bank Stadium	Recap
7	October 20	at **Pittsburgh Steelers**	**L** 16–19	3–4	Heinz Field	Recap
8	Bye					
9	November 3	at **Cleveland Browns**	**L** 18–24	3–5	FirstEnergy Stadium	Recap
10	November 10	**Cincinnati Bengals**	**W** 20–17 (OT)	4–5	M&T Bank Stadium	Recap
11	November 17	at Chicago Bears	**L** 20–23 (OT)	4–6	Soldier Field	Recap
12	November 24	New York Jets	**W** 19–3	5–6	M&T Bank Stadium	Recap
13	November 28	**Pittsburgh Steelers**	**W** 22–20	6–6	M&T Bank Stadium	Recap
14	December 8	Minnesota Vikings	**W** 29–26	7–6	M&T Bank Stadium	Recap
15	December 16	at Detroit Lions	**W** 18–16	8–6	Ford Field	Recap
16	December 22	New England Patriots	**L** 7–41	8–7	M&T Bank Stadium	Recap
17	December 29	at **Cincinnati Bengals**	**L** 17–34	8–8	Paul Brown Stadium	Recap

Note: Intra-division opponents are in bold text.
^{^[a]} Traditionally, the defending Super Bowl champions host the Kickoff Game. However, the Ravens opened on the road, due to a scheduling conflict with their Major League Baseball counterparts, the Baltimore Orioles.

=== Game summaries ===
==== Week 1: at Denver Broncos ====
NFL Kickoff game

Week One: Baltimore Ravens at Denver Broncos – Game summary

Quarter	1	2	3	4	Total
Ravens	7	10	0	10	**27**
**Broncos**	0	14	21	14	**49**

at Sports Authority Field at Mile High, Denver, Colorado

- Date: September 5
- Game time: 9:12 p.m. EDT/7:12 p.m. MDT (Game delayed 33 minutes due to lightning)
- Game weather: 83 °F (28 °C), mostly cloudy, light rain
- Game attendance: 76,977
- Referee: Walt Coleman
- TV announcers (NBC): Al Michaels, Cris Collinsworth and Michele Tafoya
- Recap, Game book

Game information

**First quarter**

- BAL – Vonta Leach 2-yard pass from Joe Flacco (Justin Tucker kick), 7:11. Ravens 7–0. **Drive: 10 plays, 80 yards, 3:58.**

**Second quarter**

- DEN – Julius Thomas 24-yard pass from Peyton Manning (Matt Prater kick), 11:35. Tied 7–7. **Drive: 1 play, 24 yards, 0:05.**
- BAL – Ray Rice 1-yard run (Justin Tucker kick), 8:03. Ravens 14–7. **Drive: 1 play, 1 yard, 0:05.**
- DEN – Julius Thomas 23-yard pass from Peyton Manning (Matt Prater kick), 5:34. Tied 14–14. **Drive: 6 plays, 80 yards, 2:29.**
- BAL – Justin Tucker 25-yard field goal, 0:07. Ravens 17–14. **Drive: 13 pays, 77 yards, 3:12.**

**Third quarter**

- DEN – Andre Caldwell 28-yard pass from Peyton Manning (Matt Prater kick), 12:30. Broncos 21–17. **Drive: 6 plays, 80 yards, 2:30.**
- DEN – Wes Welker 5-yard pass from Peyton Manning (Matt Prater kick), 10:28. Broncos 28–17. **Drive: 2 plays, 10 yards, 0:40.**
- DEN – Wes Welker 2-yard pass from Peyton Manning (Matt Prater kick), 6:37. Broncos 35–17. **Drive: 9 plays, 63 yards, 2:29.**

**Fourth quarter**

- DEN – Demaryius Thomas 26-yard pass from Peyton Manning (Matt Prater kick), 13:13. Broncos 42–17. **Drive: 5 plays, 56 yards, 1:33.**
- BAL – Marlon Brown 13-yard pass from Joe Flacco, (Justin Tucker kick), 10:28. Broncos 42–24. **Drive: 5 plays, 80 yards, 1:38.**
- BAL – Justin Tucker 30-yard field goal, 5:29. Broncos 42–27. **Drive: 8 plays, 57 yards, 2:38.**
- DEN – Demaryius Thomas 78-yard pass from Peyton Manning (Matt Prater kick), 4:30. Broncos 49–27. **Drive: 3 plays, 80 yards, 0:59.**

**Top passers**

- BAL – Joe Flacco – 34/62, 362 yards, 2 TD, 2 INT
- DEN – Peyton Manning – 27/42, 462 yards, 7 TD

**Top rushers**

- BAL – Ray Rice – 12 rushes, 36 yards, TD
- DEN – Knowshon Moreno – 9 rushes, 28 yards

**Top receivers**

- BAL – Torrey Smith – 4 receptions, 92 yards
- DEN – Demaryius Thomas – 5 receptions, 161 yards, 2 TD

Due to a conflict involving the Orioles' schedule, the Ravens opened the regular season on the road against the Broncos, the first time a defending Super Bowl champion team had done so since the Buccaneers in 2003 when they opened their regular season against the Eagles. This was a rematch of the previous year's AFC Divisional game also known as the Mile High Miracle.

The Ravens drew first blood when Joe Flacco found Vonta Leach on a 2-yard touchdown pass to take the lead 7–0 in the first quarter for the only score of the period. The Broncos tied the game in the 2nd quarter with Peyton Manning finding Julius Thomas on a 24-yard pass to take the game to 7–7. The Ravens moved back into the lead when Ray Rice ran for a 1-yard touchdown to make the score 14–7. Peyton found Julius again on a 23-yard pass to make the score 14–14 for another tie before the Ravens kicker Justin Tucker nailed a 25-yard field goal to make the score 17–14 at halftime. In the 3rd quarter, the Broncos went right back to work as Peyton found Andre Caldwell on a 28-yard touchdown pass to take a 21–17 lead followed up with finding Wes Welker on 2 consecutive passes from 5 yards and 2 yards out for an increase in the lead first to 28–17 and then to 35–17. Later on in the quarter, Peyton found Demaryius Thomas on a 26-yard pass to increase the lead to 42–17. The Ravens tried to rally a comeback in the last quarter, with Flacco finding Marlon Brown on a 13-yard pass to shorten the Broncos' lead 42–24 followed up by Tucker's 30-yard field goal to make the score 42–27. However, the Broncos wrapped things up in the game when Peyton found D. Thomas again on a 78-yard pass to make the final score 49–27. The Ravens began their season 0–1 for the first time under John Harbaugh as head coach and Joe Flacco as their starter. They also lost their first regular season opening game since 2007 as well as becoming the 2nd straight defending Super Bowl champion team to lose their season opener.

==== Week 2: vs. Cleveland Browns ====
Week Two: Cleveland Browns at Baltimore Ravens – Game summary

Quarter	1	2	3	4	Total
Browns	3	3	0	0	**6**
**Ravens**	0	0	7	7	**14**

at M&T Bank Stadium, Baltimore, Maryland

- Date: September 15
- Game time: 1:00 pm. EDT
- Game weather: 75 °F (24 °C), partly cloudy
- Game attendance: 71,098
- Referee: Bill Vinovich
- TV announcers (CBS): Marv Albert and Rich Gannon
- Recap, Game book

Game information

**First quarter**

- CLE – Billy Cundiff 21-yard field goal, 8:40. Browns 3–0. **Drive: 5 plays, 57 yards, 2:27.**

**Second quarter**

- CLE – Billy Cundiff 51-yard field goal, 0:02. Browns 6–0. **Drive: 5 plays, 33 yards, 0:29.**

**Third quarter**

- BAL – Bernard Pierce 5-yard run (Justin Tucker kick), 5:13. Ravens 7–6. **Drive: 12 plays, 80 yards, 5:50.**

**Fourth quarter**

- BAL – Marlon Brown 5-yard pass from Joe Flacco (Justin Tucker kick), 8:57. Ravens 14–6. **Drive: 8 plays, 42 yards, 3:20.**

**Top passers**

- CLE – Brandon Weeden – 21/33, 227 yards
- BAL – Joe Flacco – 22/33, 211 yards, TD

**Top rushers**

- CLE – Trent Richardson – 18 rushes, 58 yards
- BAL – Bernard Pierce – 19 rushes, 57 yards, TD

**Top receivers**

- CLE – Jordan Cameron – 5 receptions, 95 yards
- BAL – Torrey Smith – 7 receptions, 85 yards

With their 11th straight win over the Browns, the Ravens improved to 1–1.

==== Week 3: vs. Houston Texans ====
Week Three: Houston Texans at Baltimore Ravens – Game summary

Quarter	1	2	3	4	Total
Texans	3	6	0	0	**9**
**Ravens**	0	17	7	6	**30**

at M&T Bank Stadium, Baltimore, Maryland

- Date: September 22
- Game time: 1:00 pm. EDT
- Game weather: 73 °F (23 °C), sunny
- Game attendance: 71,168
- Referee: John Parry
- TV announcers (CBS): Greg Gumbel and Dan Dierdorf
- Recap, Game book

Game information

**First quarter**

- HOU – Randy Bullock 27-yard field goal, 7:06. Texans 3–0. **Drive: 16 plays, 69 yards, 7:54.**

**Second quarter**

- HOU – Randy Bullock 29-yard field goal, 14:56. Texans 6–0. **Drive: 5 plays, 18 yards, 2:35.**
- BAL – Justin Tucker 28-yard field goal, 4:11. Texans 6–3. **Drive: 11 plays, 62 yards, 4:52.**
- BAL – Daryl Smith 37-yard interception return (Justin Tucker kick), 2:39. Ravens 10–6.
- BAL – Tandon Doss 82-yard punt return (Justin Tucker kick), 0:45. Ravens 17–6.
- HOU – Randy Bullock 47-yard field goal, 0:00. Ravens 17–9. **Drive: 5 plays, 51 yards, 0:45.**

**Third quarter**

- BAL – Bernard Pierce 1-yard run (Justin Tucker kick), 11:05. Ravens 24–9. **Drive: 9 plays, 80 yards, 3:55.**

**Fourth quarter**

- BAL – Justin Tucker 45-yard field goal, 9:09. Ravens 27–9. **Drive: 13 plays, 69 yards, 6:15.**
- BAL – Justin Tucker 43-yard field goal, 1:08. Ravens 30–9. **Drive: 9 plays, 26 yards, 3:51.**

**Top passers**

- HOU – Matt Schaub – 25/35, 194 yards, INT
- BAL – Joe Flacco – 16/24, 171 yards

**Top rushers**

- HOU – Arian Foster – 12 rushes, 54 yards
- BAL – Bernard Pierce – 24 rushes, 65 yards, TD

**Top receivers**

- HOU – DeAndre Hopkins – 6 receptions, 60 yards
- BAL – Torrey Smith – 5 receptions, 92 yards

Despite playing without star running back Ray Rice and a few other key starters, the Ravens were able to hold Houston to just 9 points, despite several trips on Baltimore's side of the field, including three red zone trips. With the win, the Ravens avenged their 30-point blowout last year to Houston, improved to 2–1 overall and 7–1 all time against the Texans, including playoffs.

==== Week 4: at Buffalo Bills ====
Week Four: Baltimore Ravens at Buffalo Bills – Game summary

Quarter	1	2	3	4	Total
Ravens	0	7	7	6	**20**
**Bills**	6	14	3	0	**23**

at Ralph Wilson Stadium, Orchard Park, New York

- Date: September 29
- Game time: 1:00 pm. EDT
- Game weather: 67 °F (19 °C), mostly sunny
- Game attendance: 68,296
- Referee: Jerome Boger
- TV announcers (CBS): Ian Eagle and Dan Fouts
- Recap, Game book

Game information

**First quarter**

- BUF – Dan Carpenter 27-yard field goal, 6:11. Bills 3–0. **Drive: 11 plays, 64 yards, 4:43.**
- BUF – Dan Carpenter 27-yard field goal, 3:03. Bills 6–0. **Drive: 5 plays, 16 yards, 2:26.**

**Second quarter**

- BAL – Marlon Brown 10-yard pass from Joe Flacco (Justin Tucker kick), 13:55. Ravens 7–6. **Drive: 3 plays, 27 yards, 0:54.**
- BUF – Robert Woods 42-yard pass from EJ Manuel (Dan Carpenter kick), 8:40. Bills 13–7. **Drive: 5 plays, 70 yards, 1:59.**
- BUF – Fred Jackson 16-yard run (Dan Carpenter kick), 6:52. Bills 20–7. **Drive: 4 plays, 28 yards, 1:13.**

**Third quarter**

- BAL – Torrey Smith 26-yard pass from Joe Flacco (Justin Tucker kick), 7:17. Bills 20–14. **Drive: 4 plays, 80 yards, 1:31.**
- BUF – Dan Carpenter 22-yard field goal, 1:56. Bills 23–14. **Drive: 9 plays, 44 yards, 2:57.**

**Fourth quarter**

- BAL – Justin Tucker 35-yard field goal, 7:12. Bills 23–17. **Drive: 5 plays, 74 yards, 1:21.**
- BAL – Justin Tucker 24-yard field goal, 4:04. Bills 23–20. **Drive: 5 plays, 50 yards, 1:39.**

**Top passers**

- BAL – Joe Flacco – 25/50, 347 yards, 2 TD, 5 INT
- BUF – EJ Manuel – 10/22, 167 yards, TD, 2 INT

**Top rushers**

- BAL – Ray Rice – 5 rushes, 17 yards
- BUF – Fred Jackson – 16 rushes, 87 yards, TD

**Top receivers**

- BAL – Torrey Smith – 5 receptions, 116 yards, TD
- BUF – Robert Woods – 4 receptions, 80 yards, TD

With the loss, the Ravens fell to 2–2.

==== Week 5: at Miami Dolphins ====
Week Five: Baltimore Ravens at Miami Dolphins – Game summary

Quarter	1	2	3	4	Total
**Ravens**	3	3	10	10	**26**
Dolphins	3	10	0	10	**23**

at Sun Life Stadium, Miami Gardens, Florida

- Date: October 6
- Game time: 1:00 pm. EDT
- Game weather: 87 °F (31 °C), sunny
- Game attendance: 68,342
- Referee: Carl Cheffers
- TV announcers (CBS): Marv Albert and Rich Gannon
- Recap, Game book

Game information

**First quarter**

- BAL – Justin Tucker 42-yard field goal, 10:24. Ravens 3–0. **Drive: 7 plays, 49 yards, 2:29.**
- MIA – Caleb Sturgis 37-yard field goal, 2:16. Tied 3–3. **Drive: 4 plays, 10 yards, 1:29.**

**Second quarter**

- BAL – Justin Tucker 50-yard field goal, 11:52. Ravens 6–3. **Drive: 6 plays, 42 yards, 2:23.**
- MIA – Caleb Sturgis 25-yard field goal, 8:07. Tied 6–6. **Drive: 8 plays, 74 yards, 3:45.**
- MIA – Charles Clay 9-yard pass from Ryan Tannehill (Caleb Sturgis kick), 0:46. Dolphins 13–6. **Drive: 7 plays, 60 yards, 1:09.**

**Third quarter**

- BAL – Ray Rice 2-yard run (Justin Tucker kick), 4:18. Tied 13–13. **Drive: 6 plays, 80 yards, 2:53.**
- BAL – Justin Tucker 25-yard field goal, 4:18. Ravens 16–13. **Drive: 11 plays, 73 yards, 5:54.**

**Fourth quarter**

- BAL – Ray Rice 3-yard run (Justin Tucker kick), 12:06. Ravens 23–13. **Drive: 11 plays, 94 yards, 5:30.**
- MIA – Caleb Sturgis 48-yard field goal, 9:38. Ravens 23–16. **Drive: 7 plays, 50 yards, 2:28.**
- MIA – Reshad Jones 25-yard interception return (Caleb Sturgis kick), 8:03. Tied 23–23.
- BAL – Justin Tucker 44-yard field goal, 1:46. Ravens 26–23. **Drive: 7 plays, 34 yards, 2:25.**

**Top passers**

- BAL – Joe Flacco – 19/32, 269 yards, INT
- MIA – Ryan Tannehill – 21/40, 307 yards, TD

**Top rushers**

- BAL – Ray Rice – 27 rushes, 74 yards, 2 TD
- MIA – Lamar Miller – 7 rushes, 15 yards

**Top receivers**

- BAL – Torrey Smith – 6 receptions, 121 yards
- MIA – Mike Wallace – 7 receptions, 105 yards

The Ravens won on the road for the first time in their 2013 season and improved to 3–2.

==== Week 6: vs. Green Bay Packers ====
Week Six: Green Bay Packers at Baltimore Ravens – Game summary

Quarter	1	2	3	4	Total
**Packers**	3	3	10	3	**19**
Ravens	0	0	3	14	**17**

at M&T Bank Stadium, Baltimore, Maryland

- Date: October 13
- Game time: 1:00 pm. EDT
- Game weather: 61 °F (16 °C), cloudy
- Game attendance: 71,319
- Referee: Gene Steratore
- TV announcers (Fox): Kenny Albert, Daryl Johnston and Tony Siragusa
- Recap, Game book

Game information

**First quarter**

- GB – Mason Crosby 45-yard field goal, 13:11. Packers 3–0. **Drive: 6 plays, 53 yards, 1:49.**

**Second quarter**

- GB – Mason Crosby 31-yard field goal, 0:00. Packers 6–0. **Drive: 1 play, 0 yards, 0:02.**

**Third quarter**

- GB – Mason Crosby 50-yard field goal, 6:06. Packers 9–0. **Drive: 6 plays, 38 yards, 3:04.**
- BAL – Justin Tucker 23-yard field goal, 4:34. Packers 9–3. **Drive: 5 plays, 60 yards, 1:32.**
- GB – Jordy Nelson 64-yard pass from Aaron Rodgers (Mason Crosby kick), 2:12. Packers 16–3. **Drive: 4 plays, 80 yards, 2:22.**

**Fourth quarter**

- BAL – Jacoby Jones 11-yard pass from Joe Flacco (Justin Tucker kick), 11:52. Packers 16–10. **Drive: 10 plays, 80 yards, 5:22.**
- GB – Mason Crosby 31-yard field goal, 4:17. Packers 19–10. **Drive: 12 plays, 72 yards, 7:35.**
- BAL – Dallas Clark 18-yard pass from Joe Flacco (Justin Tucker kick), 2:04. Packers 19–17. **Drive: 6 plays, 90 yards, 2:13.**

**Top passers**

- GB – Aaron Rodgers – 17/32, 315 yards, TD, INT
- BAL – Joe Flacco – 20/34, 342 yards, 2 TD

**Top rushers**

- GB – Eddie Lacy – 23 rushes, 120 yards
- BAL – Ray Rice – 14 rushes, 34 yards

**Top receivers**

- GB – Jordy Nelson – 4 receptions, 113 yards, TD
- BAL – Tandon Doss – 4 receptions, 99 yards

With the loss, the Ravens fell to 3–3.

==== Week 7: at Pittsburgh Steelers ====
Week Seven: Baltimore Ravens at Pittsburgh Steelers – Game summary

Quarter	1	2	3	4	Total
Ravens	3	3	0	10	**16**
**Steelers**	7	3	3	6	**19**

at Heinz Field, Pittsburgh, Pennsylvania

- Date: October 20
- Game time: 4:25 pm. EDT
- Game weather: 57 °F (14 °C), partly cloudy
- Game attendance: 62,295
- Referee: Bill Leavy
- TV announcers (CBS): Ian Eagle and Dan Fouts
- Recap, Game book

Game information

**First quarter**

- PIT – Heath Miller 3-yard pass from Ben Roethlisberger (Shaun Suisham kick), 5:24. Steelers 7–0. **Drive: 10 plays, 60 yards, 6:05.**
- BAL – Justin Tucker 46-yard field goal, 0:05. Steelers 7–3. **Drive: 10 plays, 49 yards, 5:19.**

**Second quarter**

- PIT – Shaun Suisham 34-yard field goal, 9:59. Steelers 10–3. **Drive: 9 plays, 44 yards, 5:06.**
- BAL – Justin Tucker 38-yard field goal, 0:08. Steelers 10–6. **Drive: 5 plays, 18 yards, 0:31.**

**Third quarter**

- PIT – Shaun Suisham 28-yard field goal, 2:56. Steelers 13–6. **Drive: 13 plays, 70 yards, 8:03.**

**Fourth quarter**

- BAL – Justin Tucker 32-yard field goal, 13:04. Steelers 13–9. **Drive: 12 plays, 66 yards, 4:52.**
- PIT – Shaun Suisham 38-yard field goa, 9:59. Steelers 16–9. **Drive: 6 plays, 18 yards, 3:05.**
- BAL – Dallas Clark 1-yard pass from Joe Flacco (Justin Tucker kick), 1:58. Tied 16–16. **Drive: 16 plays, 73 yards, 8:01.**
- PIT – Shaun Suisham 42-yard field goal, 0:00. Steelers 19–16. **Drive: 7 plays, 39 yards, 1:58.**

**Top passers**

- BAL – Joe Flacco – 24/34, 215 yards, TD
- PIT – Ben Roethlisberger – 17/23, 160 yards, TD

**Top rushers**

- BAL – Ray Rice – 15 rushes, 45 yards
- PIT – Le'Veon Bell – 19 rushes, 93 yards

**Top receivers**

- BAL – Torrey Smith – 3 receptions, 61 yards
- PIT – Antonio Brown – 6 receptions, 50 yards

This was the first loss against the Steelers at Heinz Field since the 2010–11 NFL playoffs. With the loss, the Ravens headed into their bye week at 3–4.

==== Week 9: at Cleveland Browns ====
Week Nine: Baltimore Ravens at Cleveland Browns – Game summary

Quarter	1	2	3	4	Total
Ravens	3	7	0	8	**18**
**Browns**	7	7	7	3	**24**

at FirstEnergy Stadium, Cleveland, Ohio

- Date: November 3
- Game time: 4:25 pm. EST
- Game weather: 46 °F (8 °C), sunny
- Game attendance: 71,513
- Referee: Scott Green
- TV announcers (CBS): Kevin Harlan and Solomon Wilcots
- Recap, Game book

Game information

**First quarter**

- CLE – Davone Bess 1-yard pass from Jason Campbell (Billy Cundiff kick), 8:24. Browns 7–0. **Drive: 8 plays, 80 yards, 3:41.**
- BAL – Justin Tucker 51-yard field goal, 3:38. Browns 7–3. **Drive: 11 plays, 47 yards, 4:46.**

**Second quarter**

- CLE – Davone Bess 20-yard pass from Jason Campbell (Billy Cundiff kick), 10:08. Browns 14–3. **Drive: 9 plays, 53 yards, 3:55.**
- BAL – Marlon Brown 19-yard pass from Joe Flacco (Justin Tucker kick), 0:09. Browns 14–10. **Drive: 5 plays, 67 yards, 0:52.**

**Third quarter**

- CLE – Gary Barnidge 4-yard pass from Jason Campbell (Billy Cundiff kick), 5:11. Browns 21–10. **Drive: 2 plays, 11 yards, 0:39.**

**Fourth quarter**

- BAL – Marlon Brown 7-yard pass from Joe Flacco (Joe Flacco-Marlon Brown pass), 12:09. Browns 21–18. **Drive: 5 plays, 32 yards, 2:38.**
- CLE – Billy Cundiff 22-yard field goal, 0:14. Browns 24–18. **Drive: 15 plays, 67 yards, 6:30.**

**Top passers**

- BAL – Joe Flacco – 24/41, 250 yards, 2 TD, INT
- CLE – Jason Campbell – 23/35, 262 yards, 3 TD

**Top rushers**

- BAL – Joe Flacco – 3 rushes, 25 yards
- CLE – Willis McGahee – 21 rushes, 31 yards

**Top receivers**

- BAL – Torrey Smith – 5 receptions, 78 yards
- CLE – Greg Little – 7 receptions, 122 yards

The Ravens lost their third straight game and fell to 3–5. It also snapped the team's 11-game winning streak over the Browns. Harbaugh and Flacco's records against the Browns dropped to 11–1.

==== Week 10: vs. Cincinnati Bengals ====
Week Ten: Cincinnati Bengals at Baltimore Ravens – Game summary

Quarter	1	2	3	4	OT	Total
Bengals	0	0	3	14	0	**17**
**Ravens**	10	7	0	0	3	**20**

at M&T Bank Stadium, Baltimore, Maryland

- Date: November 10
- Game time: 1:00 pm. EST
- Game weather: 60 °F (16 °C), sunny
- Game attendance: 70,992
- Referee: Walt Coleman
- TV announcers (CBS): Greg Gumbel and Dan Dierdorf
- Recap, Game book

Game information

**First quarter**

- BAL – Dallas Clark 1-yard pass from Joe Flacco (Justin Tucker kick), 9:42. Ravens 7–0. **Drive: 3 plays, 53 yards, 1:26.**
- BAL – Justin Tucker 36-yard field goal, 4:39. Ravens 10–0. **Drive: 7 plays, 58 yards, 1:55.**

**Second quarter**

- BAL – Torrey Smith 7-yard pass from Joe Flacco (Justin Tucker kick), 6:30. Ravens 17–0. **Drive: 2 plays, 11 yards, 0:49.**

**Third quarter**

- CIN – Mike Nugent 32-yard field goal, 10:37. Ravens 17–3. **Drive: 11 plays, 61 yards, 4:23.**

**Fourth quarter**

- CIN – Giovani Bernard 18-yard pass from Andy Dalton (Mike Nugent kick), 8:22. Ravens 17–10. **Drive: 8 plays, 71 yards, 4:08.**
- CIN – A. J. Green 51-yard pass from Andy Dalton (Mike Nugent kick), 0:00. Tied 17–17. **Drive: 7 plays, 60 yards, 1:28.**

**Overtime**

- BAL – Justin Tucker 46-yard field goal, 5:27. Ravens 20–17. **Drive: 8 plays, 28 yards, 4:34.**

**Top passers**

- CIN – Andy Dalton – 24/51, 274 yards, 2 TD, 3 INT
- BAL – Joe Flacco – 20/36, 140 yards, 2 TD, 2 INT

**Top rushers**

- CIN – Giovani Bernard – 14 rushes, 58 yards
- BAL – Bernard Pierce – 8 rushes, 31 yards

**Top receivers**

- CIN – A. J. Green – 8 receptions, 151 yards, TD
- BAL – Torrey Smith – 5 receptions, 46 yards, TD

The Ravens were ahead 17–0 at half time, but the Bengals scored 17 unanswered points in the second half to force overtime. At the end of the fourth quarter, Andy Dalton threw a 51-yard Hail Mary that was first tipped by Ravens defender James Ihedigbo at the goal line, but eventually found A. J. Green in the end zone. However, about five minutes into overtime, Justin Tucker kicked the winning field goal (46 yards), and the Ravens improved to 4–5.

==== Week 11: at Chicago Bears ====
Week Eleven: Baltimore Ravens at Chicago Bears – Game summary

Quarter	1	2	3	4	OT	Total
Ravens	10	7	0	3	0	**20**
**Bears**	0	13	0	7	3	**23**

at Soldier Field, Chicago, Illinois

- Date: November 17
- Game time: 1:00 pm. EST/12:00 p.m. CST
- Game weather: 68 °F (20 °C), cloudy, wind gusts to 34 mph, showers and thunderstorms expected
- Game attendance: 62,367
- Referee: Gene Steratore
- TV announcers (CBS): Jim Nantz and Phil Simms
- Recap, Game book

Game information

**First quarter**

- BAL – Ray Rice 1-yard run (Justin Tucker kick), 9:58. Ravens 7–0. **Drive: 6 plays, 66 yards, 2:16.**
- BAL – Justin Tucker 52-yard field goal, 4:51. Ravens 10–0. **Drive: 8 plays, 38 yards, 3:53.**

**Second quarter**

- CHI – Robbie Gould 20-yard field goal, 8:50. Ravens 10–3. **Drive: 12 plays, 88 yards, 4:33.**
- CHI – David Bass 24-yard interception return (Robbie Gould kick), 8:38. Tied 10–10.
- BAL – Torrey Smith 5-yard pass from Joe Flacco (Justin Tucker kick), 4:08. Ravens 17–10. **Drive: 9 plays, 80 yards, 4:30.**
- CHI – Robbie Gould 46-yard field goal, 0:00. Ravens 17–13. **Drive: 5 plays, 22 yards, 1:00.**

**Third quarter**

- No scoring plays.

**Fourth quarter**

- CHI – Matt Forte 14-yard pass from Josh McCown (Robbie Gould kick), 10:33. Bears 20–17. **Drive: 11 plays, 83 yards, 5:59.**
- BAL – Justin Tucker 21-yard field goal, 0:03. Tied 20–20. **Drive: 15 plays, 81 yards, 4:41.**

**Overtime**

- CHI – Robbie Gould 38-yard field goal, 8:41. Bears 23–20. **Drive: 7 plays, 60 yards, 3:38.**

**Top passers**

- BAL – Joe Flacco – 17/31, 162 yards, TD, 2 INT
- CHI – Josh McCown – 19/31, 216 yards, TD

**Top rushers**

- BAL – Ray Rice – 25 rushes, 131 yards, TD
- CHI – Matt Forte – 18 rushes, 83 yards

**Top receivers**

- BAL – Tandon Doss – 3 receptions, 37 yards
- CHI – Alshon Jeffery – 7 receptions, 83 yards

The game was interrupted in the first quarter for about two hours as a result of a torrential downpour at Soldier Field. After a slow start to the season, Ray Rice rushed for 131 yards and a touchdown. The Ravens were able to get the game to overtime, but the Bears won on a Robbie Gould field goal. The Ravens fell to 4–6.

==== Week 12: vs. New York Jets ====
Week Twelve: New York Jets at Baltimore Ravens – Game summary

Quarter	1	2	3	4	Total
Jets	3	0	0	0	**3**
**Ravens**	3	6	10	0	**19**

at M&T Bank Stadium, Baltimore, Maryland

- Date: November 24
- Game time: 1:00 pm. EST
- Game weather: 33 °F (1 °C), partly cloudy, windy
- Game attendance: 71,148
- Referee: Jeff Triplette
- TV announcers (CBS): Greg Gumbel and Dan Dierdorf
- Recap, Game book

Game information

**First quarter**

- NYJ – Nick Folk 27-yard field goal, 6:52. Jets 3–0. **Drive: 9 plays, 55 yards, 3:53.**
- BAL – Justin Tucker 30-yard field goal, 1:59. Tied 3–3. **Drive: 11 plays, 63 yards, 4:53.**

**Second quarter**

- BAL – Justin Tucker 26-yard field goal, 10:15. Ravens 6–3. **Drive: 10 plays, 84 yards, 4:30.**
- BAL – Justin Tucker 33-yard field goal, 1:56. Ravens 9–3. **Drive: 9 plays, 45 yards, 4:36.**

**Third quarter**

- BAL – Justin Tucker 53-yard field goal, 10:01. Ravens 12–3. **Drive: 4 plays, −2 yards, 1:16.**
- BAL – Jacoby Jones 66-yard pass from Joe Flacco (Justin Tucker kick), 0:05. Ravens 19–3. **Drive: 3 plays, 88 yards, 1:28.**

**Fourth quarter**

- No scoring plays.

**Top passers**

- NYJ – Geno Smith – 9/22, 127 yards, 2 INT
- BAL – Joe Flacco – 17/26, 273 yards, TD, INT

**Top rushers**

- NYJ – Bilal Powell – 11 rushes, 41 yards
- BAL – Bernard Pierce – 11 rushes, 30 yards

**Top receivers**

- NYJ – Greg Salas – 2 receptions, 48 yards
- BAL – Jacoby Jones – 4 receptions, 103 yards, TD

The Ravens improved to 5–6.

==== Week 13: vs. Pittsburgh Steelers ====
Thanksgiving Day game

Week Thirteen: Pittsburgh Steelers at Baltimore Ravens – Game summary

Quarter	1	2	3	4	Total
Steelers	0	0	7	13	**20**
**Ravens**	7	3	6	6	**22**

at M&T Bank Stadium, Baltimore, Maryland

- Date: November 28
- Game time: 8:30 pm. EST
- Game weather: 37 °F (3 °C), clear
- Game attendance: 71,005
- Referee: Clete Blakeman
- TV announcers (NBC): Al Michaels, Cris Collinsworth and Michele Tafoya
- Recap, Game book

Game information

**First quarter**

- BAL – Torrey Smith 7-yard pass from Joe Flacco (Justin Tucker kick), 9:18. Ravens 7–0. **Drive: 8 plays, 71 yards, 3:06.**

**Second quarter**

- BAL – Justin Tucker 43-yard field goal, 3:01. Ravens 10–0. **Drive: 9 plays, 31 yards, 4:18.**

**Third quarter**

- BAL – Justin Tucker 34-yard field goal, 9:21. Ravens 13–0. **Drive: 13 plays, 52 yards, 5:39.**
- PIT – Emmanuel Sanders 8-yard pass from Ben Roethlisberger 6:26. Ravens 13–7. **Drive: 7 plays, 80 yards, 2:55.**
- BAL – Justin Tucker 38-yard field goal, 3:49. Ravens 16–7. **Drive: 5 plays, 7 yards, 2:37.**

**Fourth quarter**

- BAL – Justin Tucker 45-yard field goal, 13:59. Ravens 19–7. **Drive: 7 plays, 37 yards, 3:00.**
- PIT – Le'Veon Bell 1-yard run (Shaun Suisham kick), 9:32. Ravens 19–14. **Drive: 10 plays, 60 yards, 4:27.**
- BAL – Justin Tucker 48-yard field goal, 5:37. Ravens 22–14. **Drive: 7 plays, 36 yards, 3:55.**
- PIT – Jerricho Cotchery 1-yard pass from Ben Roethlisberger (pass failed), 1:03. Ravens 22–20. **Drive: 13 plays, 79 yards, 4:34.**

**Top passers**

- PIT – Ben Roethlisberger – 28/44, 257 yards, 2 TD
- BAL – Joe Flacco – 24/35, 251 yards, TD

**Top rushers**

- PIT – Le'Veon Bell – 16 rushes, 73 yards, TD
- BAL – Bernard Pierce – 9 rushes, 35 yards

**Top receivers**

- PIT – Heath Miller – 8 receptions, 86 yards
- BAL – Torrey Smith – 6 receptions, 93 yards, TD

The Ravens won consecutive games for the first time since September and improved to 6–6. Additionally, they also improved to 2–0 in Thanksgiving Day games.

Controversy erupted in the third quarter when Steelers' head coach Mike Tomlin stood on the field along his team's sideline as Jacoby Jones broke free on a kickoff return for a potential game breaking touchdown. Tomlin, with his back to the approaching play, appeared to glance over his shoulder then place his foot briefly onto the field as he jumped out of the way, causing Jones to veer inside where he was tackled. Several Ravens players claimed Tomlin had intentionally interfered with Jones; if officials had agreed, a touchdown could have been awarded to the Ravens based on the palpably unfair act. However, no penalty was called for interference or for standing in the white border area reserved for the officiating crew. On December 4, 2013, the NFL fined Tomlin $100,000.

==== Week 14: vs. Minnesota Vikings ====
Week Fourteen: Minnesota Vikings at Baltimore Ravens – Game summary

Quarter	1	2	3	4	Total
Vikings	0	3	3	20	**26**
**Ravens**	7	0	0	22	**29**

at M&T Bank Stadium, Baltimore, Maryland

- Date: December 8
- Game time: 1:00 pm. EST
- Game weather: 33 °F (1 °C), snow
- Game attendance: 70,921
- Referee: Pete Morelli
- TV announcers (Fox): Chris Myers, Tim Ryan and Jennifer Hale
- Recap, Game book

Game information

**First quarter**

- BAL – Ed Dickson 1-yard pass from Joe Flacco (Justin Tucker kick), 4:14. Ravens 7–0. **Drive: 4 plays, 25 yards, 2:15.**

**Second quarter**

- MIN – Blair Walsh 39-yard field goal, 4:28. Ravens 7–3. **Drive: 11 plays, 45 yards, 5:42.**

**Third quarter**

- MIN – Blair Walsh 40-yard field goal, 12:02. Ravens 7–6. **Drive: 8 plays, 38 yards, 2:58.**

**Fourth quarter**

- MIN – Jerome Simpson 8-yard pass from Matt Cassel (pass failed), 14:22. Vikings 12–7. **Drive: 5 plays, 33 yards, 1:40.**
- BAL – Dennis Pitta 1-yard pass from Joe Flacco (Joe Flacco-Torrey Smith pass), 2:05. Ravens 15–12. **Drive: 9 plays, 64 yards, 4:27.**
- MIN – Toby Gerhart 41-yard run (Blair Walsh kick), 1:27. Vikings 19–15. **Drive: 2 plays, 68 yards, 0:38.**
- BAL – Jacoby Jones 77-yard kickoff return (Justin Tucker kick), 1:16. Ravens 22–19.
- MIN – Cordarrelle Patterson 79-yard pass from Matt Cassel (Blair Walsh kick), 0:45. Vikings 26–22. **Drive: 3 plays, 79 yards, 0:31.**
- BAL – Marlon Brown 9-yard pass from Joe Flacco (Justin Tucker kick), 0:04. Ravens 29–26. **Drive: 5 plays, 80 yards, 0:41.**

**Top passers**

- MIN – Matt Cassel – 17/38, 265 yards, 2 TD
- BAL – Joe Flacco – 28/50, 245 yards, 3 TD, 3 INT

**Top rushers**

- MIN – Toby Gerhart – 15 rushes, 89 yards, TD
- BAL – Ray Rice – 17 rushes, 67 yards

**Top receivers**

- MIN – Cordarrelle Patterson – 5 receptions, 141 yards, TD
- BAL – Marlon Brown – 7 receptions, 92 yards, TD

In an eventful game, Vikings running back Adrian Peterson appeared to injure his ankle in the second quarter, and did not return to the game.

In the fourth quarter there were six lead changes, with five touchdowns scored in the final 125 seconds. Marlon Brown caught a nine-yard pass from Joe Flacco with four seconds remaining, and the Ravens improved to 7–6. This also became the snowiest home game in Ravens history, although only 1.6 inches (4.1 cm) of snow fell.

==== Week 15: at Detroit Lions ====
Week Fifteen: Baltimore Ravens at Detroit Lions – Game summary

Quarter	1	2	3	4	Total
**Ravens**	0	9	3	6	**18**
Lions	7	0	3	6	**16**

at Ford Field, Detroit, Michigan

- Date: December 16
- Game time: 8:40 pm. EST
- Game weather: Played indoors (dome stadium)
- Game attendance: 64,742
- Referee: Carl Cheffers
- TV announcers (ESPN): Mike Tirico, Jon Gruden and Lisa Salters
- Recap, Game book

Game information

**First quarter**

- DET – Reggie Bush 14-yard run (David Akers kick), 10:57. Lions 7–0. **Drive: 8 plays, 78 yards, 4:03.**

**Second quarter**

- BAL – Justin Tucker 29-yard field goal, 12:49. Lions 7–3. **Drive: 15 plays, 81 yards, 6:25.**
- BAL – Justin Tucker 24-yard field goal, 2:32. Lions 7–6. **Drive: 8 plays, 76 yards, 3:49.**
- BAL – Justin Tucker 32-yard field goal, 0:00. Ravens 9–7. **Drive: 7 plays, 71 yards, 1:20.**

**Third quarter**

- BAL – Justin Tucker 49-yard field goal, 8:00. Ravens 12–7. **Drive: 7 plays, 42 yards, 2:40.**
- DET – David Akers 40-yard field goal, 1:49. Ravens 12–10. **Drive: 11 plays, 58 yards, 6:11.**

**Fourth quarter**

- BAL – Justin Tucker 53-yard field goal, 8:06. Ravens 15–10. **Drive: 4 plays, −1 yards, 0:56.**
- DET – Joseph Fauria 14-yard pass from Matthew Stafford (pass failed), 2:21. Lions 16–15. **Drive: 11 plays, 80 yards, 5:45.**
- BAL – Justin Tucker 61-yard field goal, 0:38. Ravens 18–16. **Drive: 7 plays, 24 yards, 1:43.**

**Top passers**

- BAL – Joe Flacco – 20/38, 222 yards
- DET – Matthew Stafford – 18/34, 235 yards, TD, 3 INT

**Top rushers**

- BAL – Ray Rice – 12 rushes, 56 yards
- DET – Reggie Bush – 17 rushes, 86 yards, TD

**Top receivers**

- BAL – Jacoby Jones – 6 receptions, 80 yards
- DET – Calvin Johnson – 6 receptions, 98 yards

Justin Tucker scored six field goals, including at the time a franchise record (and career long) 61-yard field goal with 38 seconds remaining in the fourth quarter (Tucker would later hit a 66-yard field goal in 2021, also against the Lions). The Ravens won their fourth straight game and improved to 8–6.

==== Week 16: vs. New England Patriots ====
Week Sixteen: New England Patriots at Baltimore Ravens – Game summary

Quarter	1	2	3	4	Total
**Patriots**	14	3	3	21	**41**
Ravens	0	0	0	7	**7**

at M&T Bank Stadium, Baltimore, Maryland

- Date: December 22
- Game time: 4:25 pm. EST
- Game weather: 65 °F (18 °C), cloudy
- Game attendance: 71,433
- Referee: Ron Winter
- TV announcers (CBS): Jim Nantz and Phil Simms
- Recap, Game book

Game information

**First quarter**

- NE – LeGarrette Blount 1-yard run (Stephen Gostkowski kick), 9:39. Patriots 7–0. **Drive: 6 plays, 64 yards, 2:47.**
- NE – Shane Vereen 4-yard pass from Tom Brady (Stephen Gostkowski kick), 4:51. Patriots 14–0. **Drive: 6 plays, 53 yards, 3:26.**

**Second quarter**

- NE – Stephen Gostkowski 45-yard field goal, 14:55. Patriots 17–0. **Drive: 6 plays, 37 yards, 2:23.**

**Third quarter**

- NE – Stephen Gostkowski 42-yard field goal, 7:15. Patriots 20–0. **Drive: 7 plays, 19 yards, 3:10.**

**Fourth quarter**

- BAL – Joe Flacco 1-yard run (Justin Tucker kick), 9:21. Patriots 20–7. **Drive: 9 plays, 90 yards, 2:48.**
- NE – LeGarrette Blount 7-yard run (Stephen Gostkowski kick), 2:05. Patriots 27–7. **Drive: 9 plays, 48 yards, 4:32.**
- NE – Chandler Jones fumble recovery in end zone (Stephen Gostkowski kick), 1:59. Patriots 34–7.
- NE – Tavon Wilson 74-yard interception return (Stephen Gostkowski kick), 0:40. Patriots 41–7.

**Top passers**

- NE – Tom Brady – 14/26, 172 yards, TD
- BAL – Joe Flacco – 22/38, 260 yards, 2 INT

**Top rushers**

- NE – LeGarrette Blount – 16 rushes, 76 yards, 2 TD
- BAL – Ray Rice – 11 rushes, 40 yards

**Top receivers**

- NE – Julian Edelman – 7 receptions, 77 yards
- BAL – Torrey Smith – 3 receptions, 69 yards

With the loss, the Ravens fell to 8–7 and back to seventh place in the playoff hunt, enabling their division rivals Bengals to secure the AFC North title. This was the Ravens worst loss at home in franchise history at a 34 point margin only to be tied 12 years later.

==== Week 17: at Cincinnati Bengals ====
Week Seventeen: Baltimore Ravens at Cincinnati Bengals – Game summary

Quarter	1	2	3	4	Total
Ravens	6	0	11	0	**17**
**Bengals**	7	10	0	17	**34**

at Paul Brown Stadium, Cincinnati, Ohio

- Date: December 29
- Game time: 1:00 pm. EST
- Game weather: 43 °F (6 °C), cloudy
- Game attendance: 62,406
- Referee: Scott Green
- TV announcers (CBS): Jim Nantz and Phil Simms
- Recap, Game book

Game information

**First quarter**

- BAL – Justin Tucker 38-yard field goal, 13:48. Ravens 3–0. **Drive: 4 plays, 1 yard, 0:54.**
- BAL – Justin Tucker 22-yard field goal, 2:26. Ravens 6–0. **Drive: 12 plays, 61 yards, 6:37.**
- CIN – A. J. Green 53-yard pass from Andy Dalton (Mike Nugent kick), 0:17. Bengals 7–6. **Drive: 4 plays, 78 yards, 2:09.**

**Second quarter**

- CIN – Mike Nugent 39-yard field goal, 6:36. Bengals 10–6. **Drive: 7 plays, 22 yards, 2:17.**
- CIN – Marvin Jones Jr. 16-yard pass from Andy Dalton (Mike Nugent kick), 1:51. Bengals 17–6. **Drive: 5 plays, 52 yards, 2:50.**

**Third quarter**

- BAL – Justin Tucker 34-yard field goal, 9:30. Bengals 17–9. **Drive: 7 plays, 31 yards, 2:44.**
- BAL – Marlon Brown 8-yard pass from Joe Flacco (Ray Rice run), 5:13. Tied 17–17. **Drive: 6 plays, 40 yards, 2:21.**

**Fourth quarter**

- CIN – Andy Dalton 1-yard run (Mike Nugent kick), 13:29. Bengals 24–17. **Drive: 12 plays, 90 yards, 6:44.**
- CIN – Mike Nugent 38-yard field goal, 12:19. Bengals 27–17. **Drive: 4 plays, 0 yards, 0:57.**
- CIN – Dre Kirkpatrick 21-yard interception return (Mike Nugent kick), 4:07. Bengals 34–17.

**Top passers**

- BAL – Joe Flacco – 30/50, 192 yards, TD, 3 INT
- CIN – Andy Dalton – 21/36, 281 yards, 2 TD, 4 INT

**Top rushers**

- BAL – Bernard Pierce – 5 rushes, 28 yards
- CIN – BenJarvus Green-Ellis – 11 rushes, 66 yards

**Top receivers**

- BAL – Dennis Pitta – 8 receptions, 63 yards
- CIN – Andrew Hawkins – 3 receptions, 74 yards

With this defeat, the Ravens were eliminated from post-season contention, assuring the NFL of a new Super Bowl champion for the ninth straight year. The Ravens finished the season with a record of 8–8. This was also the last NFL game for running back Ray Rice as he was indefinitely suspended by the NFL and released by Ravens the following season.

=== Standings ===
==== Division ====
AFC North
	W	L	T	PCT	DIV	CONF	PF	PA	STK
^{(3)} Cincinnati Bengals	11	5	0	.688	3–3	8–4	430	305	W2
Pittsburgh Steelers	8	8	0	.500	4–2	6–6	379	370	W3
Baltimore Ravens	8	8	0	.500	3–3	6–6	320	352	L2
Cleveland Browns	4	12	0	.250	2–4	3–9	308	406	L7

==== Conference ====
AFC
#	Team	Division	W	L	T	PCT	DIV	CONF	SOS	SOV	STK
**Division winners**
1	Denver Broncos	West	13	3	0	.813	5–1	9–3	.469	.423	W2
2	New England Patriots	East	12	4	0	.750	4–2	9–3	.473	.427	W2
3 (Note: Cincinnati defeated Indianapolis head-to-head (Week 14, 42–28).)	Cincinnati Bengals	North	11	5	0	.688	3–3	8–4	.480	.494	W2
4	Indianapolis Colts	South	11	5	0	.688	6–0	9–3	.484	.449	W3
**Wild cards**
5	Kansas City Chiefs	West	11	5	0	.688	2–4	7–5	.445	.335	L2
6	San Diego Chargers	West	9	7	0	.563	4–2	6–6	.496	.549	W4
**Did not qualify for the postseason**
7 (Note: Pittsburgh finished with a better division record than Baltimore.) (Note: Pittsburgh defeated the New York Jets head-to-head (Week 6, 19–6).)	Pittsburgh Steelers	North	8	8	0	.500	4–2	6–6	.469	.441	W3
8 (Note: Baltimore defeated the New York Jets head-to-head (Week 12, 19–3).)	Baltimore Ravens	North	8	8	0	.500	3–3	6–6	.484	.418	L2
9 (Note: The New York Jets finished with a better division record than Miami.)	New York Jets	East	8	8	0	.500	3–3	5–7	.488	.414	W2
10	Miami Dolphins	East	8	8	0	.500	2–4	7–5	.523	.523	L2
11	Tennessee Titans	South	7	9	0	.438	2–4	6–6	.504	.375	W2
12	Buffalo Bills	East	6	10	0	.375	3–3	5–7	.520	.500	L1
13 (Note: Oakland and Jacksonville finished with a better conference record than Cleveland.) (Note: Oakland defeated Jacksonville head-to-head (Week 2, 19–9).)	Oakland Raiders	West	4	12	0	.250	1–5	4–8	.523	.359	L6
14 (Note: Jacksonville defeated Cleveland head-to-head (Week 13, 32–28).)	Jacksonville Jaguars	South	4	12	0	.250	3–3	4–8	.504	.234	L3
15	Cleveland Browns	North	4	12	0	.250	2–4	3–9	.516	.477	L7
16	Houston Texans	South	2	14	0	.125	1–5	2–10	.559	.500	L14
**Tiebreakers** (Note: When breaking ties for three or more teams under the NFL's rules, they are first broken within divisions, then comparing only the highest ranked remaining team from each division.)
