= Tandon Doss =

American football player (born 1989)

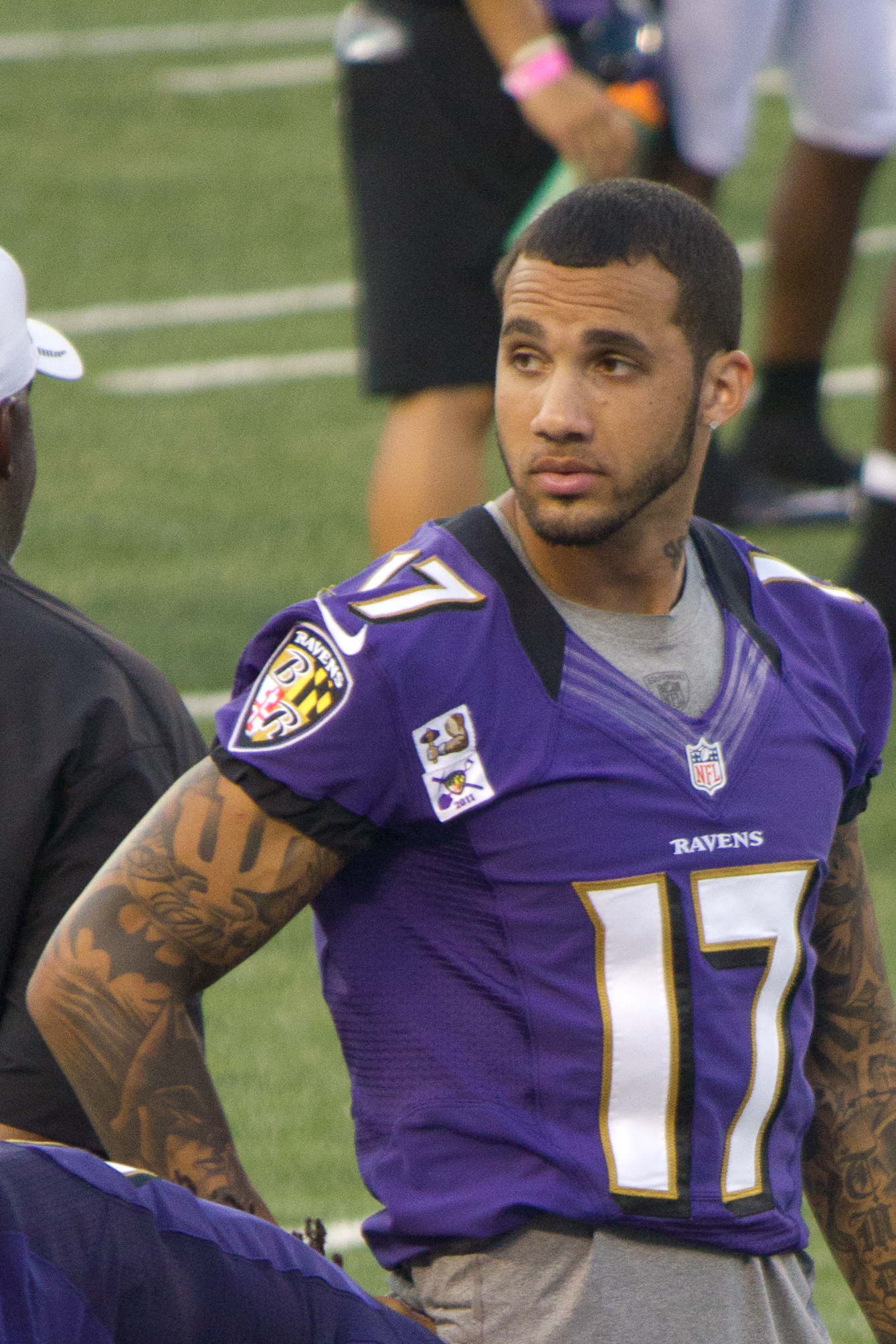
- Doss at Ravens M&T Bank Stadium practice in 2012

No. 17
- Position: Wide receiver

Personal information
- Born: September 22, 1989 (age 37); Indianapolis, Indiana, U.S.
- Listed height: 6 ft 2 in (1.88 m)
- Listed weight: 205 lb (93 kg)

Career information
- High school: Ben Davis (Indianapolis)
- College: Indiana (2008–2010)
- NFL draft: 2011: 4th round, 123rd overall pick

Career history
- Baltimore Ravens (2011–2013); Jacksonville Jaguars (2014–2015)

Awards and highlights
- Super Bowl champion (XLVII); 2× First-team All-Big Ten (2009, 2010)

Career NFL statistics
- Receptions: 26
- Receiving yards: 428
- Receiving touchdowns: 1
- Return yards: 412
- Return touchdowns: 1
- Stats at Pro Football Reference

Tandon Mic Doss (born September 22, 1989) is an American former professional football player who was a wide receiver in the National Football League (NFL). He played college football for the Indiana University Hoosiers. Doss was selected by the Baltimore Ravens in the fourth round of the 2011 NFL draft.

== Early life ==
Doss graduated in the class of 2008 from Ben Davis High School in Indianapolis, Indiana.

== College career ==
=== 2008 season ===
In his freshman season, Doss played in just 8 games, recording 14 receptions for 189 yards with a touchdown.

=== 2009 season ===
In his sophomore season, Doss started all 12 regular season games, recording 77 receptions for 962 yards and 5 touchdowns. With Indiana coming off a disastrous 3-9 campaign, Tandon was also used on rushing plays, where he recorded 127 yards and a rushing touchdown on 14 attempts. With the graduation of Marcus Thigpen the previous season, Doss was used on punt and kick returns. He contributed 44 punt return yards on 4 returns, as well as 533 kick return yards on 25 returns.

For 2009, Doss averaged 128.8 all-purpose yards. He was one of the few bright spots as the Hoosiers finished a disappointing 4–8. Doss was named to the All-Big Ten First Team.

=== 2010 season ===
In his junior year at Indiana, Doss recorded 63 receptions for 706 yards and a career best 7 touchdowns. Doss also recorded 28 carries for 163 rushing yards and another touchdown. While he was not Indiana's primary punt returner, Doss was Indiana's main kick returner, where he recorded 1,016 kick return yards on 41 returns. All told, Doss averaged an impressive 175.8 all-purpose yards per game, which was the 4th best figure nationally and the best in the Big Ten.

For the second year in a row, Tandon Doss was named to the All-Big Ten First Team. After his junior season, Doss announced that he would forgo his senior season and enter the 2011 NFL draft.

== Professional career ==
Pre-draft measurables
Height	Weight	Arm length	Hand span	Wingspan	40-yard dash	10-yard split	20-yard split	20-yard shuttle	Three-cone drill	Vertical jump	Broad jump	Bench press
6 ft 2 in (1.88 m)	201 lb (91 kg)	31 1/4 in (0.79 m)	10 1/8 in (0.26 m)	6 ft 4 in (1.93 m)	4.62 s	1.60 s	2.72 s	4.22 s	6.91 s	33.5 in (0.85 m)	9 ft 8 in (2.95 m)	14 reps
All values from NFL Combine/Pro Day

=== Baltimore Ravens ===
Tandon Doss was selected in the fourth round with the 123rd overall pick of the 2011 NFL draft by the Baltimore Ravens. He was the fourth player selected by the Baltimore Ravens in 2011, and second wide receiver behind the second round selection Torrey Smith from the University of Maryland. Despite a strong preseason, Doss had no catches in the 2011 season. Doss caught his first career receiving touchdown in Week 7 of the 2012 season against the Houston Texans. However, the Texans would win that game 43–13. Doss earned his first NFL Championship by virtue of the Ravens winning Super Bowl XLVII, but was waived from the team on August 31, 2013. When Doss was waived by the Baltimore Ravens, he was worked out by the Green Bay Packers, but Doss left with no contract. Tandon Doss was later re-signed to the Baltimore Ravens on September 9, 2013. On his 24th birthday, during Week 3 of the 2013 season, against the Houston Texans, Doss returned a punt 82 yards for a touchdown.

=== Jacksonville Jaguars ===
On March 18, 2014, the Jacksonville Jaguars signed Doss for a two-year deal worth $1.505 million. The Jaguars placed Doss on injured reserve on August 29, with an ankle injury.

Doss was waived by Jacksonville on August 29, 2015, as part of the first preseason roster cuts.

=== NFL statistics ===
Season			Receiving						Returning					Fumbles	
Year	GP	GS	Tgt	Rec	Yds	Lng	Avg	TD	KR	Yds	Avg	Lng	TD	Fum	Lost
2011	6	0	0	0	0	0	0	0	0	0	0	0	0	0	0
2012	14	0	18	7	123	39	17.6	1	4	53	13.3	40	0	0	0
2013	15	2	36	19	305	63	16.1	0	23	359	15.6	82	1	1	0
