= Torrey Smith =

American football player (born 1989)

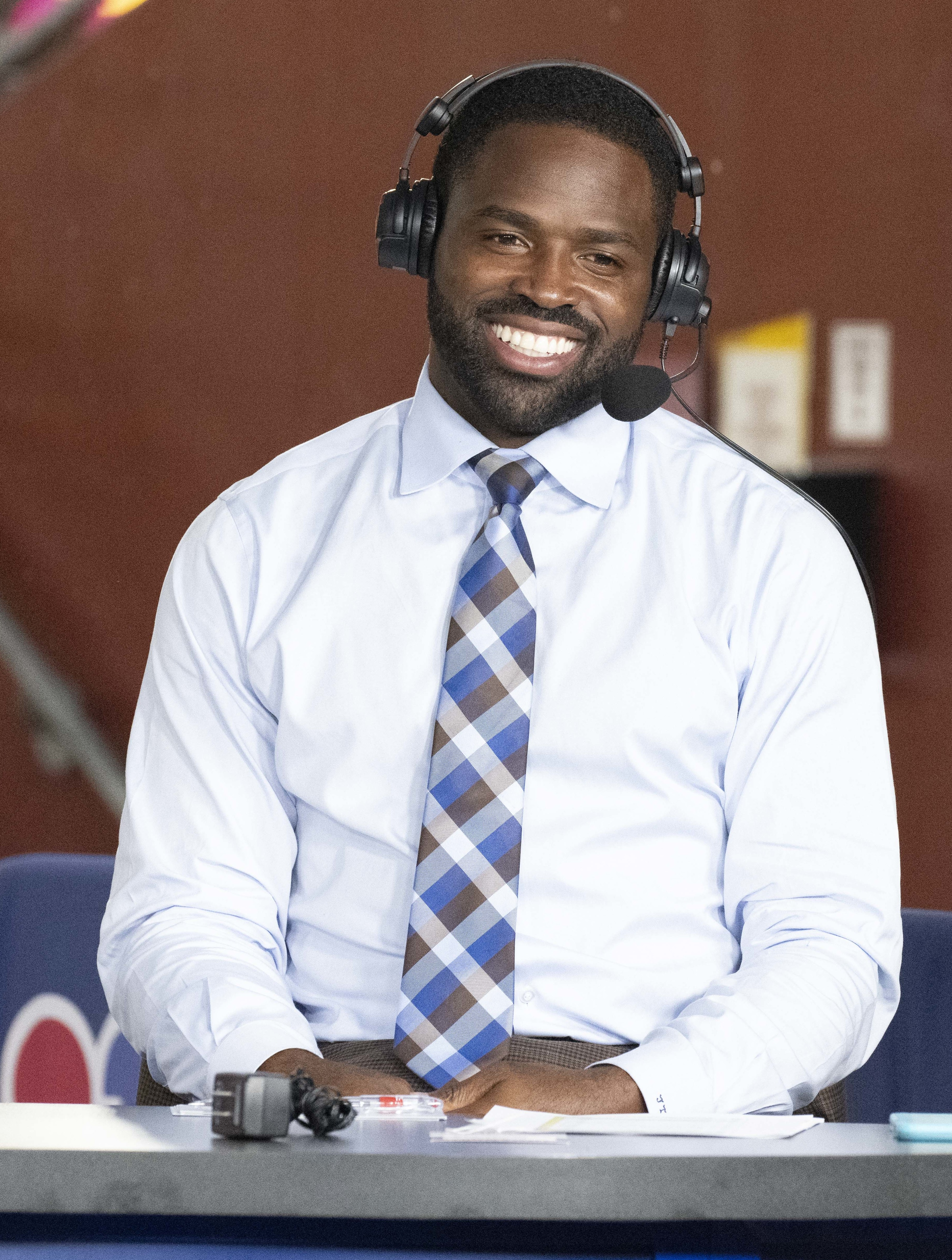
- Smith in Landover, Maryland in 2021

No. 82, 11
- Position: Wide receiver

Personal information
- Born: January 26, 1989 (age 37); Colonial Beach, Virginia, U.S.
- Listed height: 6 ft 0 in (1.83 m)
- Listed weight: 205 lb (93 kg)

Career information
- High school: Stafford (Stafford County, Virginia)
- College: Maryland (2007–2010)
- NFL draft: 2011: 2nd round, 58th overall pick

Career history
- Baltimore Ravens (2011–2014); San Francisco 49ers (2015–2016); Philadelphia Eagles (2017); Carolina Panthers (2018)

Awards and highlights
- 2× Super Bowl champion (XLVII, LII); NCAA kickoff return yards leader (2009); First-team All-ACC (2010); Second-team All-ACC (2009)

Career NFL statistics
- Receptions: 319
- Receiving yards: 5,141
- Receiving touchdowns: 41
- Stats at Pro Football Reference

James Torrey Smith (born January 26, 1989) is an American former professional football player who was a wide receiver for eight seasons in the National Football League (NFL). He played college football for the Maryland Terrapins and was selected by the Baltimore Ravens in the 2011 NFL draft. He also played for the San Francisco 49ers, Philadelphia Eagles, and Carolina Panthers. Smith is a two-time Super Bowl champion, winning Super Bowl XLVII with the Ravens and Super Bowl LII with the Eagles.

== Early life ==
Smith was born on January 26, 1989, and grew up with his mother Monica Jenkins in Colonial Beach, Virginia, and Fredericksburg, Virginia. The oldest of seven children, Smith helped his single mother, who attended Rappahannock Community College in the day and worked at night, with household chores and earned honor roll grades in school. Smith attended Colonial Beach Elementary School until 3rd grade. Smith went on to Stafford Senior High School, where he played basketball as a guard, and football at several different positions. He enjoys fishing as a pastime.

Smith played on the Stafford Indians football team as a quarterback, running back, wide receiver, cornerback, kickoff returner, and punt returner. In Stafford's 2004 game against King George, Smith opened with a 54-yard kickoff return, played quarterback, and scored on a 63-yard punt return. His coach, Roger Pierce, said, "Torrey can do those type of things for us. We expect him to do those things." During his senior year in 2006, Smith had 155 carries for 815 yards and 12 touchdowns, completed nine of 25 passes for 230 yards and two touchdowns, and made three receptions for 81 yards. Over the course of his interscholastic career, Smith returned six kickoffs for touchdowns. He earned all-state kick returner honors as a sophomore, all-district honors as a junior, and honorable mention All-Northwest Region quarterback honors, all-district, and all-area honors as a senior.

As a college prospect, Rivals.com ranked him 30th nationally among dual-threat quarterbacks, Scouts, Inc. ranked him 33rd nationally among wide receivers, and SuperPrep placed him on its Virginia 33. ESPN assessed him as a "do-it-all prospect" and projected him as a wide receiver because of his size and speed. Smith was recruited by Maryland, Penn State, and Virginia Tech. He was shown interest by Virginia, but did not receive a scholarship offer. The Virginia staff, which questioned whether he had recovered his speed after a basketball injury during his junior year, asked Smith to run a 4.5-second 40-yard dash at a Nike combine at Clemson University, which he did. The Virginia staff then asked him to repeat the feat at the University of Virginia campus, but Maryland offered a scholarship, which Smith accepted. He later said, "I kind of hold a grudge against U.Va. a little bit. I'm not afraid to say it. I kind of want to show them that they questioned my speed and whether I was going to get it back. I want to show them that I'm all healed up." Virginia head coach Al Groh said of the Fredericksburg native before the 2009 game against Maryland, "Clearly if we forsaw [sic] him being the type of player that he is now, he would be returning kicks for Virginia. So we are not above admitting that there is a player that certainly has turned out to be superior to what many people thought, including ourselves. He's—regardless of what the circumstances were in the past—he is a superior college football player."

== College career ==
=== 2007 season ===
Smith sat out the 2007 season at the University of Maryland, College Park, on redshirt status, and was voted the scout team player of the year as a freshman. He was named the scout team player of the week before the Florida State game. In summer camp, Smith adjusted from playing quarterback to wide receiver, a position he had limited experience with in high school. Teammate Darrius Heyward-Bey said, "He's like a sponge. He's taking it all in, asking a lot of questions—and that's good for a receiver." In December, he practiced with the first team after Isaiah Williams suffered an injury.

=== 2008 season ===
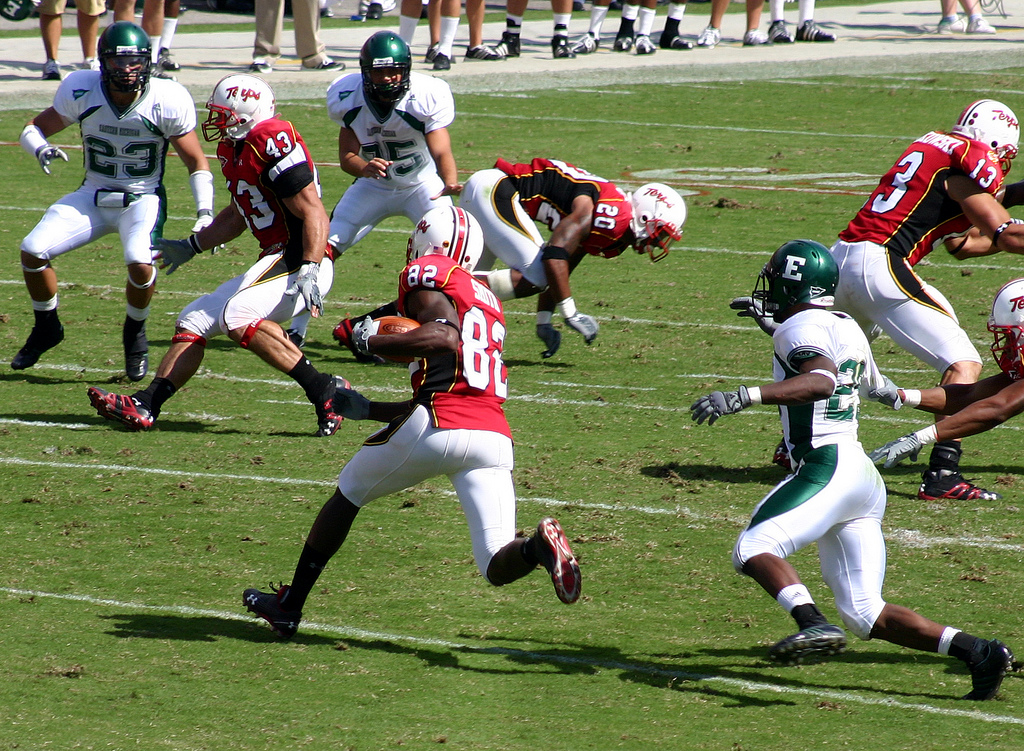
Torrey Smith returns a kick during the Terps' 51–24 victory over Eastern Michigan, September 20, 2008.

Smith drew praise from the Maryland coaching staff during summer workouts before the 2008 season, and The Washington Times predicted Smith, alongside receiver Ronnie Tyler, would earn significant playing time. He played in all 13 games and started in the last six of the season. He also saw action on special teams as a kickoff returner. Smith recorded 24 receptions for 336 yards and two touchdowns. In its midseason report, The Baltimore Sun credited Smith for often giving an inconsistent Maryland team good field position with his long kick returns.

Against Middle Tennessee, Smith returned four kicks for 86 yards. He made his first career reception for three yards the following week against #23 California. Against Eastern Michigan, Smith recorded two receptions for 58 yards and four kickoffs for 126 yards. Smith tallied his first collegiate touchdown on a third-quarter reception from quarterback Chris Turner in the 20–17 comeback at #20 Clemson. He recorded 144 return yards against Virginia.

In the 26–0 victory over #21 Wake Forest, Smith returned the opening kick 34 yards, and caught two passes for eight yards. Smith made his career first start against NC State and recorded four kickoff returns for 85 yards, which set the school single-season kickoff return yards record for a freshman, surpassing the 566-yard mark set by Da'Rel Scott in 2007. Smith blocked a punt against Virginia Tech, and led the team with 163 all-purpose yards including 62 receiving yards. He recorded one reception for 12 yards against 16th-ranked North Carolina.

In the latter part of the season, Smith increased his role and was elevated over Isaiah Williams as the number-two receiver across from Darrius Heyward-Bey. Head coach Ralph Friedgen explained that his presence would alleviate the coverage on Heyward-Bey and praised Smith's blocking ability in the running game. Against Florida State, Smith broke the school record for single-season kickoff return yards, previously held by cornerback Josh Wilson. He had 119 all-purpose yards, including one 13-yard reception. Smith posted his season-best performance against 21st-ranked Boston College with 245 all-purpose yards and eight receptions for 115 yards and a touchdown.

In the 2008 Humanitarian Bowl, he returned a kickoff 99 yards for a touchdown against Nevada, which broke the bowl's previous return record of 98 yards. It was also the first time a Maryland player returned a kickoff for a touchdown in a bowl game. At the end of the season, Smith had returned 42 kickoffs for 1,089 yards, which set a new Atlantic Coast Conference single-season record. Smith led the team with 1,425 all-purpose yards, which put him ahead of starting running back Da'Rel Scott who compiled 1,304 yards.

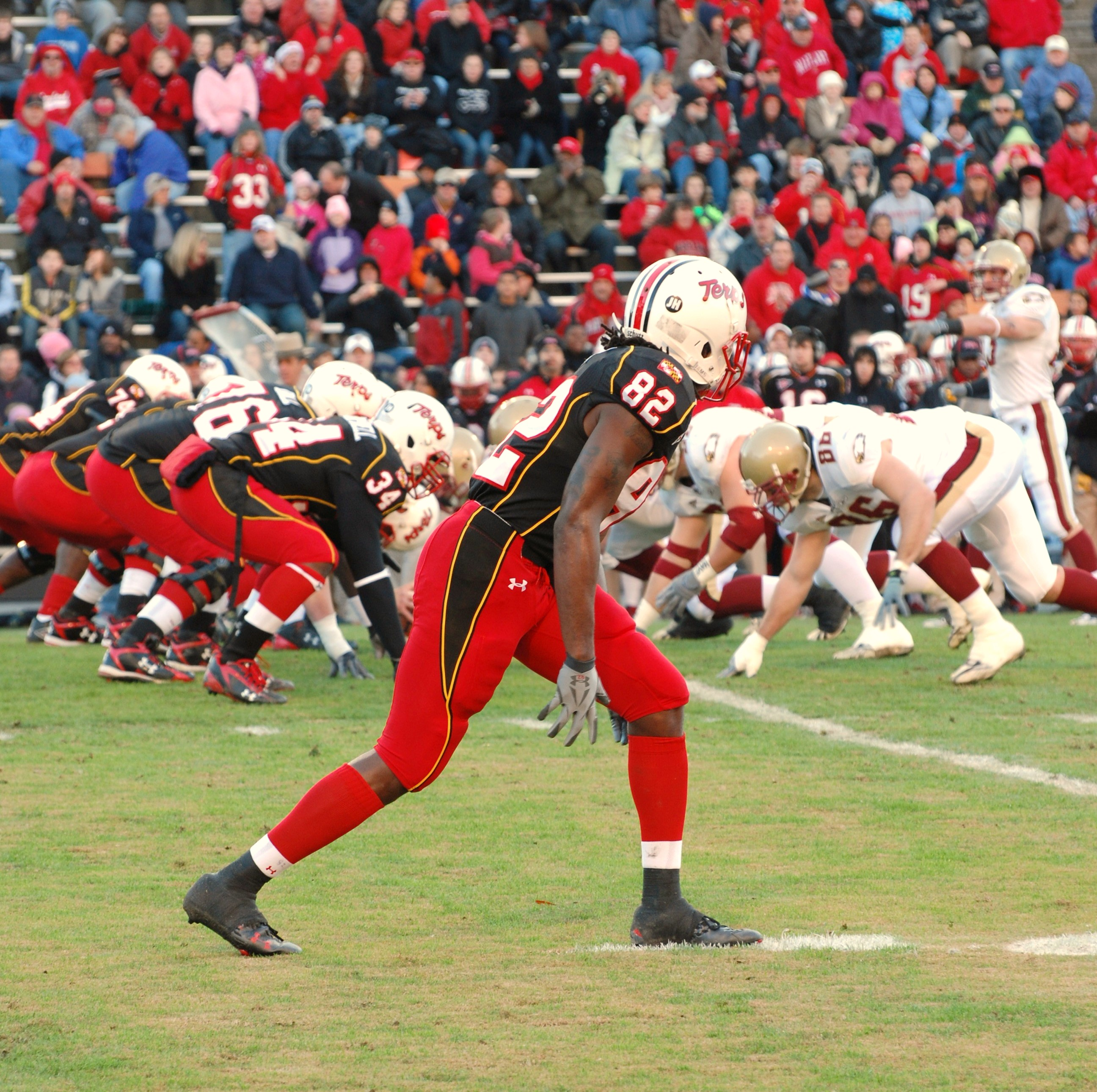
Smith lines up against Boston College in 2009.

=== 2009 season ===
Before the 2009 season, Smith reportedly struggled in Maryland's summer camp, dividing his time between practice and online courses at night. Towards the end of camp, head coach Ralph Friedgen noted an improvement in his performance, which reestablished Smith as the team's top receiver alongside Adrian Cannon.

During the season, Smith saw action in all twelve games, including ten as a starter, and he amassed 61 receptions for 824 receiving yards and five touchdowns, 51 kickoff returns for 1,309 yards and two touchdowns, and eleven rushing attempts for 59 yards and one touchdown. His kickoff return yardage led the NCAA and surpassed the ACC single-season record that he had set the previous year. Smith finished the season ranked sixth in the nation in all-purpose yards. He was one of two players, alongside Donald Buckram of UTEP, to record more than 260 all-purpose yards in three games. Smith led the team in receptions, receiving yards and return yards. Smith's 2,192 all-purpose yards were the second-most ever recorded by an ACC player behind only C. J. Spiller of Clemson.

In the season opener at #12 California, he caught one pass for 28 yards and made two rushing attempts for 16 yards. Against Division I FCS James Madison, Smith caught eight passes for 80 yards, rushed twice for 22 yards and a touchdown, and returned four kickoffs 127 yards, including one 81-yard touchdown return. Despite the strong statistical performance, head coach Ralph Friedgen said, "To be honest with you, I was kind of expecting more out of Torrey. I've got a lot of faith in him. I'm not surprised at all about the return yards. But I think if you asked Torrey, he has high expectations for himself, too." Smith agreed with the criticism, and acknowledged that in his second season as a wide receiver, he had room for improvement. He recorded five catches for 165 yards and two touchdowns in the Middle Tennessee game, and caught four passes for 112 yards against Rutgers. He led the team with three receptions for 64 yards and a 29-yard touchdown against Clemson, and became the first player in the nation to reach 1,000 all-purpose yards on the season. Against Wake Forest, Smith returned six kickoffs 194 yards and caught a career-high ten passes for 70 yards and a touchdown. For his performance, he was named the Atlantic Coast Conference Specialist of the Week. Wake Forest head coach Jim Grobe said, "This kid is probably a better receiver [than Darrius Heyward-Bey]. He catches the ball better, he's got great foot speed. He can hurt you running the ball or catching it. Everywhere you look, he's a problem."

Coach Friedgen named Smith the special teams captain for the Virginia game. During the game, Virginia chose to kick short to keep the ball away from Smith on kickoffs, and quarterback Chris Turner did not target him until the fourth quarter. He finished with three receptions for 34 yards and no returns. He recorded two receptions for 13 yards at Duke. At NC State, he caught eight passes for 64 yards and returned a kickoff 84 yards for a touchdown. During the game, he surpassed the ACC single-season kickoff return yards record which he had set the previous season. He had four receptions for 55 yards against 21st-ranked Virginia Tech, seven receptions for 71 yards against Florida State, and six receptions for 68 yards and a touchdown against Boston College.

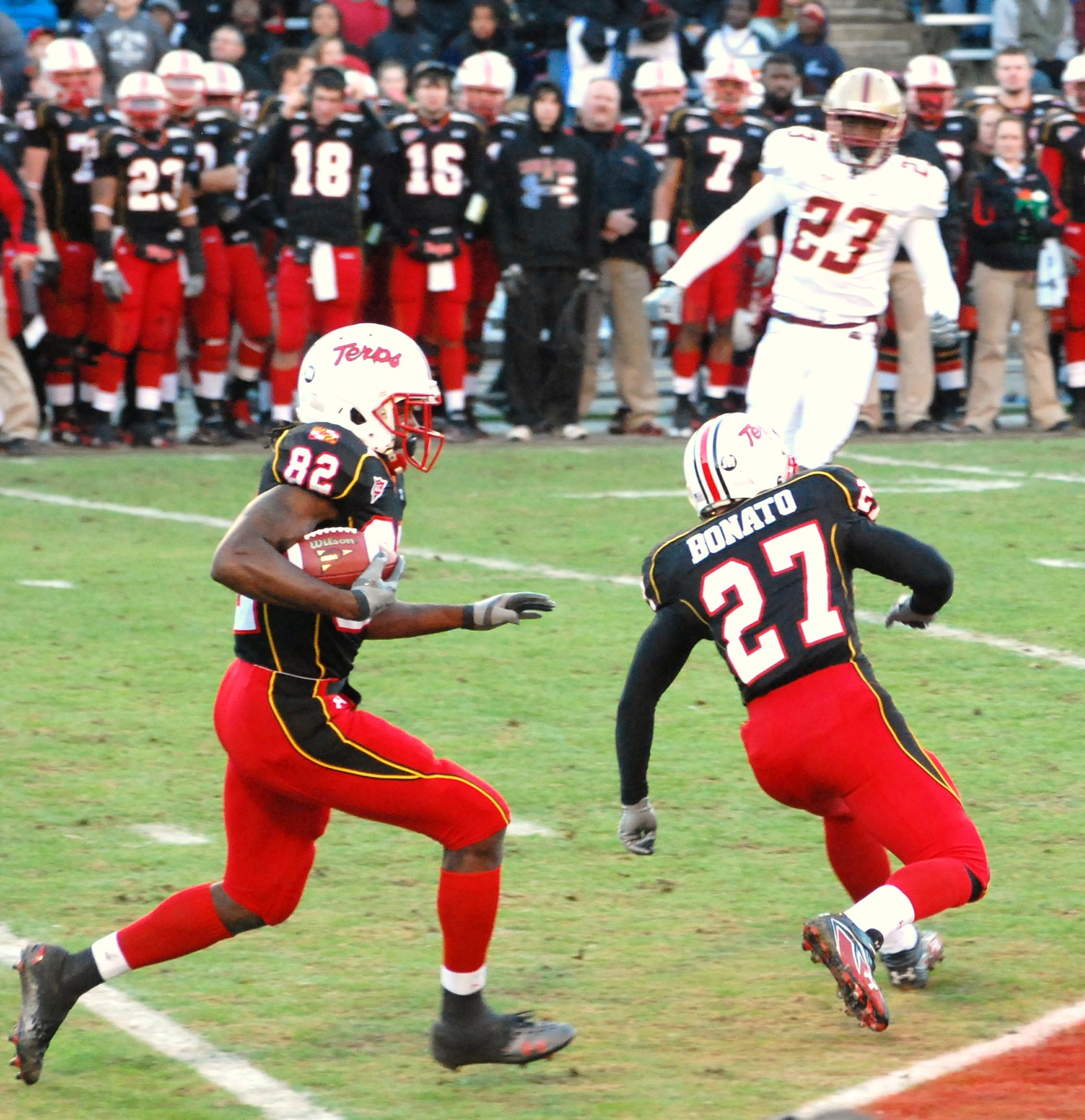
Smith advances the ball against Boston College

After the season, the Atlantic Coast Sports Media Association named Smith to the All-ACC second team as both a wide receiver and return specialist. Phil Steele's and The Sporting News named him to their All-ACC first teams as a wide receiver. Phil Steele's and Rivals.com named him to their All-ACC second teams as a kick returner. Smith submitted his name to a panel of NFL scouts after the season, which evaluated him as a third- or fourth-round selection in the 2010 NFL draft.

=== 2010 season ===
Smith returned to Maryland for the 2010 season to increase his NFL draft stock, complete his criminology and criminal justice degree in December, and improve the team's record from a 2–10 finish the year prior. He said, "I'll have the same talk with the same people [about the draft]. But my focus is to change what happened last year." Prior to the start of the season, the coaching staff planned to increase Smith's efficiency by playing him fewer snaps in an attempt to keep him fresh. In the Red–White spring game, Smith accounted for 90 of starting quarterback Jamarr Robinson's 146 passing yards, including a "fingertip catch in the end zone" on the opening drive, Before the season, Smith was named to the watchlists for the Paul Hornung Award and Biletnikoff Award.

Maryland started the 2010 season against Navy, which intentionally kicked away from the elusive return man. In the home opener against Morgan State, Smith scored on a 24-yard pass from backup quarterback Danny O'Brien and a five-yard pass from starter Jamarr Robinson. Smith scored two touchdowns of 60 and 80 yards in Maryland's failed comeback attempt at 21st-ranked West Virginia, 31–17. After the West Virginia game, Sports Illustrated considered Smith a rising prospect for the 2011 NFL draft and described him as "a true vertical threat who has NFL size and home-run hitting speed." Redshirt freshman Danny O'Brien secured the starting quarterback position after Jamarr Robinson suffered a shoulder injury, and the rookie soon "found great chemistry" with Smith. Against Florida International, Smith made eight receptions for 159 yards, including a 68-yard touchdown catch and a 32-yard catch that set up another score. He limped off of the field after his touchdown catch, but later said, "I was fine. I was Jim Brown-ing." The following week, he was limited in practice, but played against Duke and caught a 44-yard reception during a first-half scoring drive. However, the lingering ankle ailment continued to bother Smith, and head coach Ralph Friedgen considered using punt returner Tony Logan for kickoff returns until he fully healed. Smith had four receptions for 55 yards in the 31–7 loss to Clemson, but was hindered by his sore ankle which kept him out of practice. Smith said, "I don't like sitting out [practices]. I feel like I'm leaving my teammates out to dry. I didn't battle with them all week." After the game, Friedgen said in the future he would sit players who could not practice by the Thursday before a game.

Against Boston College, running back Da'Rel Scott handled some of the kickoff return duties, but Smith returned two for 38 yards. He also caught eight passes for 34 yards and a touchdown. The following week, Maryland clinched bowl eligibility with a 62–14 rout of Wake Forest. Regarding the turnaround from the previous season's 2–10 record, Smith said, "We expected to be in this position. No one else expected it," but added "No one is going to respect us [yet] because we have not beaten any top dogs." In the game, Smith had five catches for 66 yards, including a 17-yard touchdown reception. Before the game against Miami, the coaching staff reported Smith's ankle had improved and he was "as healthy as he has been in a while". Against Miami, he had three receptions for 35 yards. Smith also compiled 46 yards on two kickoff returns to break the ACC career kickoff return yards record with 2,724 yards, which surpassed the previous mark of 2,688 yards held by Brandon Tate of North Carolina. At Virginia, Smith took advantage of the Cavaliers' man-to-man coverage and had seven receptions for 157 yards, including a 12-yard touchdown. On a 62-yard catch, he said he was tackled on the seven-yard line only because he was exhausted. Quarterback Danny O'Brien expressed his readiness to throw deep passes to Smith in single coverage, "If it's even, I put it up." Maryland entered the game against 25th-ranked Florida State in contention for the ACC Atlantic Division championship. Smith recorded a phone message and video appealing to fans in a bid to improve home attendance, which had been lackluster throughout the season. The game was attended by 48,115 spectators, which surpassed the athletic department's projections. Maryland lost, 30–16, and Smith had seven receptions for 69 yards.

Smith delivered a record-setting performance against #23 North Carolina State, in which he collected a career-high 14 receptions for 224 yards and four touchdowns. Smith scored on catches of 10, 11, 12, and 71 yards, and his performance helped Maryland win, 38–31, despite amassing negative rushing yards. During the game, Smith set the school record for career all-purpose yardage, which surpassed Lamont Jordan's previous mark of 4,960 yards. His four touchdown receptions in a single game also set a school record, which surpassed the previous mark of three shared by Vernon Davis, Guilian Gary, Jermaine Lewis, and James Milling. Smith's season tally of twelve touchdowns also set a school record, which surpassed the mark of nine shared by Jermaine Lewis and Marcus Badgett. He also joined Marcus Badgett as just the second Maryland receiver to accumulate over 1,000 yards in a single season. For his performance, the Atlantic Coast Conference named him the Offensive Back of the Week.

Upon the conclusion of the regular season, the Atlantic Coast Sports Media Association named Smith to the All-ACC first team as a wide receiver. In the 2010 Military Bowl against East Carolina, Smith had two catches for ten yards. Shortly after the game, he declared himself available for the 2011 NFL draft in order to financially support his family. ESPN draft analyst Mel Kiper Jr. said, while he believed Smith could have potentially reached first-round status with another year, he would likely be selected in the second or third round of the 2011 NFL Draft.

== Professional career ==
Pre-draft measurables
Height	Weight	Arm length	Hand span	Wingspan	40-yard dash	10-yard split	20-yard split	20-yard shuttle	Three-cone drill	Vertical jump	Broad jump	Bench press
6 ft 0 7/8 in (1.85 m)	204 lb (93 kg)	32 5/8 in (0.83 m)	8 5/8 in (0.22 m)	6 ft 5 5/8 in (1.97 m)	4.44 s	1.54 s	2.58 s	4.13 s	6.72 s	41.0 in (1.04 m)	10 ft 6 in (3.20 m)	19 reps
All values from NFL Combine

=== Baltimore Ravens ===
==== 2011 season ====
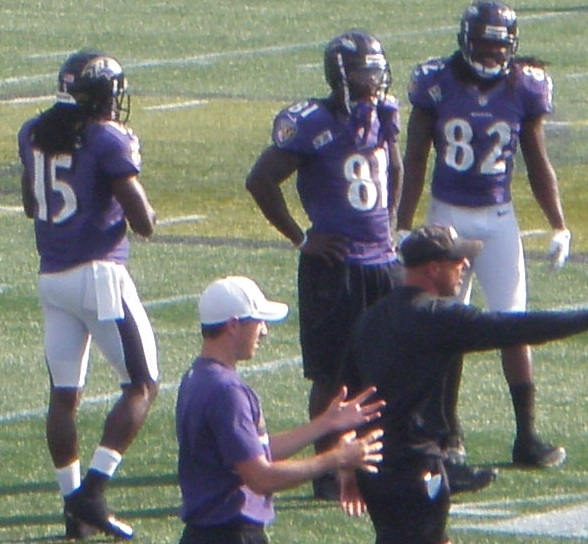
Smith (82) at Navy–Marine Corps Memorial Stadium in 2012. Also pictured are LaQuan Williams (15) and Anquan Boldin (81).

The Baltimore Ravens selected Smith with the 58th overall pick in the second round of the 2011 NFL draft. Smith, who ran the 40-yard dash in 4.41 seconds at the combine, was described as a deep threat that the team had missed the previous season.

After facing criticism for a lack of production in the first two weeks, Smith turned in a record-setting performance against the St. Louis Rams in Week 3. In the first quarter, he scored on each of his first three career receptions with 74-, 41-, and 18-yard touchdowns. The 74-yard score was the longest completion of quarterback Joe Flacco's career until it was tied, then surpassed in 2013 and 2014 respectively. He became the first NFL rookie, and only the 12th player, to amass three touchdown receptions in a single quarter. Smith finished the game with five receptions for 152 yards in the 37–7 victory.

Smith caught a 26-yard game-winning touchdown against the division rival Pittsburgh Steelers on November 6, 2011. On November 20, 2011, Smith made six receptions for a Ravens rookie record 165 yards against the Cincinnati Bengals, including a 49-yard touchdown from Joe Flacco. He was named AFC Offensive Player of the Week for his game against the Bengals.

He finished the season with Ravens rookie records of 50 receptions, 841 receiving yards, 52.6 yards per game, and 7 receiving touchdowns (the last led the team and was tied two years later by Marlon Brown).

In the AFC Championship Game, the Ravens faced the number-one seeded New England Patriots. He finished the loss with three catches for 82 yards.

==== 2012 season ====
The morning before Baltimore's Week 3 NBC Sunday Night Football rematch with the New England Patriots, Smith's younger brother Tevin Jones died in a motorcycle accident, leaving the former distraught. To honor his late brother, Smith played and led his team in receptions (6), receiving yards (127) and receiving touchdowns (2) and helped the Ravens win 31–30.

In a Week 10 matchup against the Oakland Raiders, Smith caught two passes for touchdowns in the 55–20 win. On November 23, Smith recorded a season-high 144 yards, seven catches in an overtime victory over the San Diego Chargers.

Smith finished the year with 48 catches, 855 yards and a then-career-high eight touchdown receptions.

In the Divisional Playoff Round against the Denver Broncos, Smith caught both a 59-yard pass and a 32-yard pass for touchdowns in a 38–35 double overtime win. He finished the game with three catches, 98 yards, and the pair of touchdowns.

The Ravens won Super Bowl XLVII against the San Francisco 49ers 34–31, earning Smith his first Super Bowl ring. Smith ended the game with two catches for a total of 35 yards.

==== 2013 season ====
After wide receiver Anquan Boldin was traded in free agency, Smith started the 2013 season as the Ravens starting receiver.

Smith scored his first touchdown of the season in a Week 4 loss to the Buffalo Bills. He finished the game catching five passes for a total of 166 yards, including a 74-yard catch. In the following game, Smith caught six passes for 121 yards in a win against the Miami Dolphins.

In Week 15, Smith reached the 1,000 yard receiving season mark for the first time in his career. He was also the first Raven's-drafted receiver to eclipse 1,000 yards for the team. Smith finished the year with 65 receptions, 1,128 yards, and four touchdowns.

==== 2014 season ====
In Week 8, Smith caught four passes for 51-yards and two touchdowns, as he helped Joe Flacco set the NFL record for the fastest time to record five touchdown passes (16 minutes and 3 seconds). The Ravens defeated the Tampa Bay Buccaneers 48–17. The following week, against the Atlanta Falcons, Smith scored the game-sealing touchdown. With less than two minutes left in the game and facing a fourth down, Flacco threw a pass to Smith, who caught it for a 39-yard score. In Week 13, on the first possession, Smith scored the game's opening touchdown against the San Diego Chargers, after juggling the ball in the endzone. Smith recorded a pair of touchdowns in the Raven's 33–34 loss.

In their regular season finale, the Ravens took on their division rivals, the Cleveland Browns, needing a win and a Chargers loss to get into the playoffs. Trailing 10–6 in the final quarter, Smith caught a deep pass from Flacco, and on the very next play, a 16-yard touchdown to give Baltimore the lead. Smith finished the game with four receptions for 83 yards, including two decisive fourth quarter plays. Baltimore won the game 20–10 and clinched a playoff spot with the help of a Chargers loss.

In the Wild Card Round of the playoffs, the Ravens faced the division rival Pittsburgh Steelers. They won the game 30–17, with Smith recording two catches for 28 yards and a touchdown. In the Divisional Round, the Ravens lost 31–35 to the eventual Super Bowl XLIX champion New England Patriots.

Smith finished the season with 49 receptions, 767 yards, and a career-high 11 touchdown catches. He also had three games in which he scored multiple touchdowns.

During March 2015, Smith sent a letter to the entire city of Baltimore, announcing that he would test free agency and thanking the Ravens organization and its fans for starting his career in Baltimore.

He left the organization as the franchise-record holder in yards per catch in the regular season (16.9).

=== San Francisco 49ers ===
==== 2015 season ====
On March 10, 2015, Smith signed a five-year, $40 million contract ($22 million guaranteed) with the San Francisco 49ers. Smith would start alongside former Raven's teammate Anquan Boldin.

In the 49ers' season-opener, Smith made his team debut against the Minnesota Vikings in the 20–3 victory. The following game, Smith caught six passes for a season-high 120 receiving yards and a 75-yard touchdown, followed up with a two-point conversion catch during the 49ers 43–18 loss to the Pittsburgh Steelers.

Smith appeared in all 16 games and started 12 of them. He finished the 2015 season with 33 receptions, 663 receiving yards and four touchdowns, three of his scores having been over 70 yards. He led the league in yards per reception with 20.1.

==== 2016 season ====
On December 11, in Week 14, Smith suffered a concussion after hitting his head hard on the turf with his helmet on during a 23–17 loss to the New York Jets. He was placed on injured reserve on December 23, 2016. He finished the 2016 season with 20 receptions for 267 receiving yards and three receiving touchdowns in 12 games.

On March 7, 2017, Smith was released by the 49ers.

=== Philadelphia Eagles ===
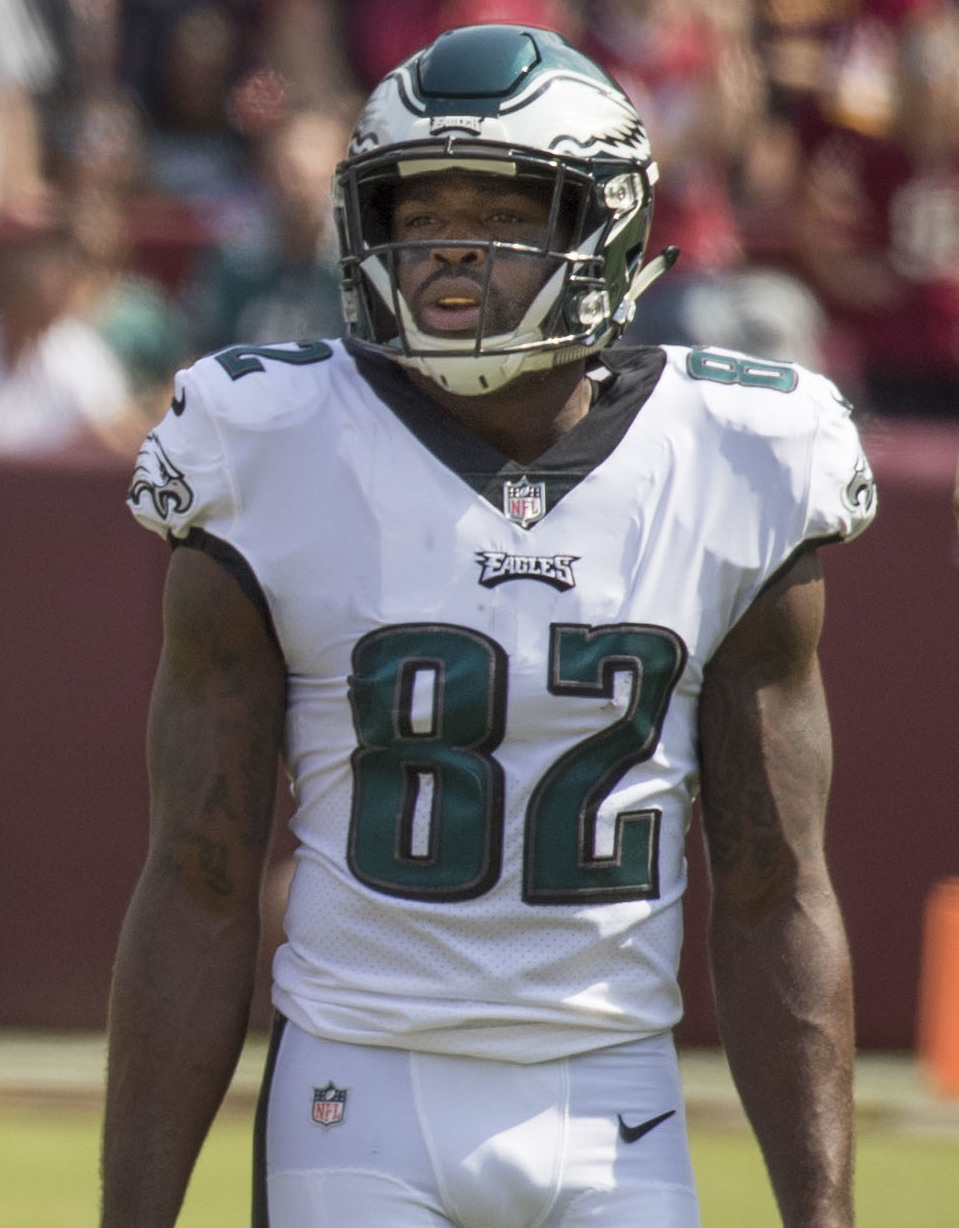
Smith with the Eagles in 2017

On March 9, 2017, Smith signed a three-year, $15 million contract with the Philadelphia Eagles with second and third-year options at the same salary. The signing reunited him with former teammates Corey Graham and Dannell Ellerbe. On September 10, 2017, in the season-opening 30–17 victory over the Washington Redskins, Smith made his Eagles debut. On October 8, 2017, Smith caught a 59-yard touchdown pass from quarterback Carson Wentz, marking his first touchdown as a member of the Eagles, in the 34–7 victory over the Arizona Cardinals.

The Eagles finished the season 13–3 to earn the #1 seed in the NFC and a first-round bye. Smith finished the season with 36 catches for 430 yards and two touchdowns. In the Divisional Round against the Atlanta Falcons, Smith recorded three catches for 39 yards in a 15–10 victory. In the NFC Championship Game against the Minnesota Vikings, Smith had five catches for 69 yards and caught a touchdown pass in the 38–7 victory. The Eagles advanced to their third Super Bowl in franchise history where they defeated the New England Patriots in Super Bowl LII. Smith caught five passes for 49 yards, earning his second Super Bowl ring.

=== Carolina Panthers ===
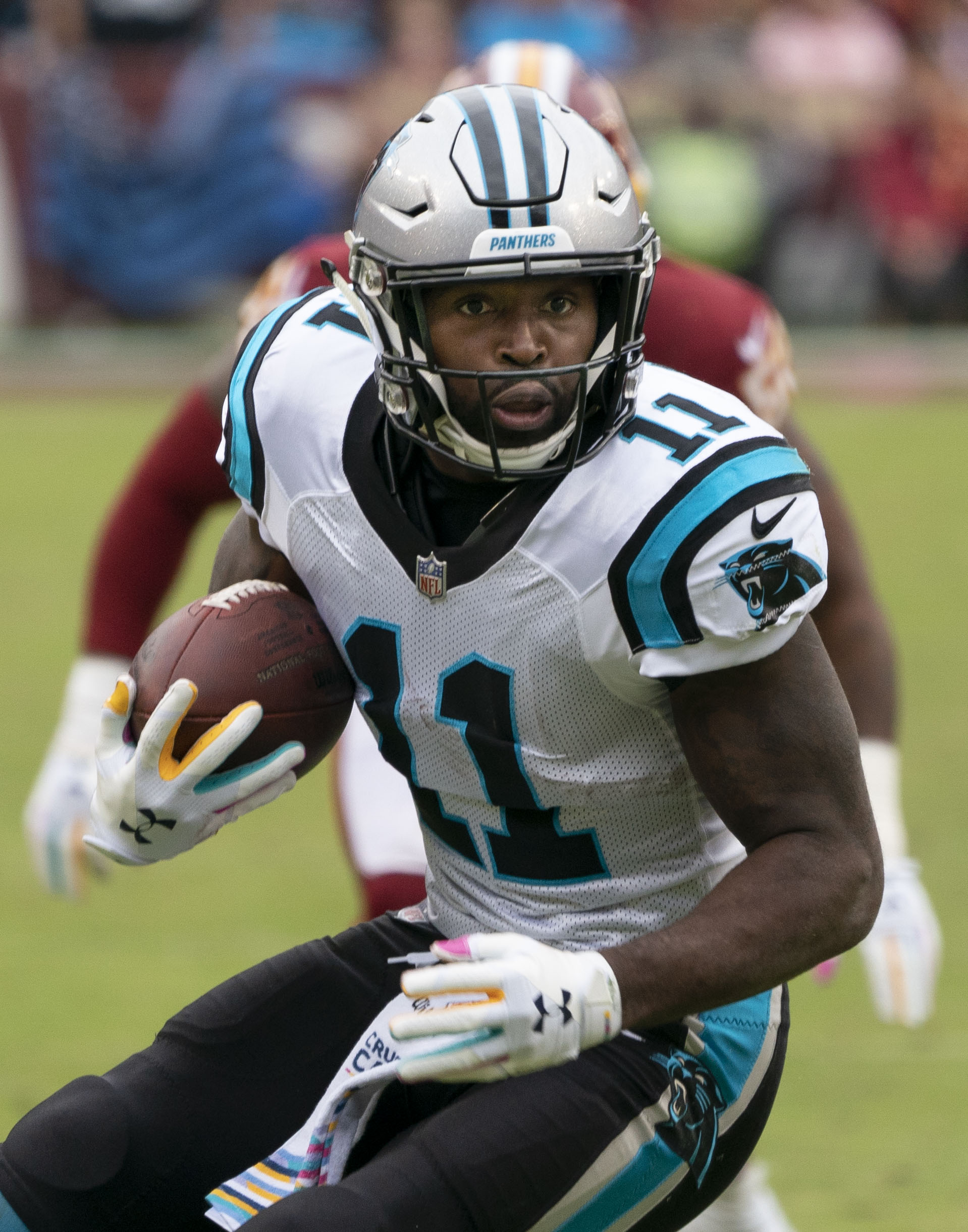
Smith with the Panthers in 2018

On March 14, 2018, the Eagles traded Smith to the Carolina Panthers for cornerback Daryl Worley. He played in 11 games with six starts, recording 17 catches for 190 yards and two touchdowns.

During the 2019 preseason, Smith appeared in two games but did not record a reception. He was released on September 1, 2019, and announced his retirement two days later.

== Career statistics ==
=== NFL ===
Legend
	Won the Super Bowl
	Led the league
**Bold**	Career high

==== Regular season ====
Year	Team	Games		Receiving					Rushing					Fumbles	
Year	Team	GP	GS	Rec	Yds	Avg	Lng	TD	Att	Yds	Avg	Lng	TD	Fum	Lost
2011	BAL	16	14	50	841	16.8	74	7	**4**	**39**	**9.8**	**16**	0	**1**	0
2012	BAL	16	16	49	855	17.4	54	8	3	9	3.0	13	0	0	0
2013	BAL	16	16	**65**	**1,128**	17.4	74	4	—	—	—	—	—	**1**	0
2014	BAL	16	16	49	767	15.7	53	**11**	—	—	—	—	—	0	0
2015	SF	16	12	33	663	**20.1**	**76**	4	—	—	—	—	—	0	0
2016	SF	12	12	20	267	13.4	53	3	—	—	—	—	—	0	0
2017	PHI	16	14	36	430	11.9	59	2	1	−3	−3.0	−3	0	0	0
2018	CAR	11	6	17	190	11.2	35	2	—	—	—	—	—	0	0
Career		119	106	319	5,141	16.1	76	41	8	45	5.6	16	0	2	0

==== Playoffs ====
Year	Team	Games		Receiving					Rushing					Fumbles	
Year	Team	GP	GS	Rec	Yds	Avg	Lng	TD	Att	Yds	Avg	Lng	TD	Fum	Lost
2011	BAL	2	1	4	91	**22.8**	42	1	—	—	—	—	—	0	0
2012	BAL	4	4	11	**233**	21.2	**59**	**2**	**1**	0	0.0	0	0	0	0
2014	BAL	2	2	5	90	18.0	35	1	—	—	—	—	—	0	0
2017	PHI	3	3	**13**	157	12.1	41	1	—	—	—	—	—	0	0
Career		11	10	33	571	17.3	59	5	1	0	0.0	0	0	0	0

=== College ===
Legend
	Led the NCAA
**Bold**	Career high

Year	Team	Games		Receiving					Returning					Rushing				
Year	Team	GP	GS	Rec	Yds	Avg	Lng	TD	Ret	Yds	Avg	Lng	TD	Att	Yds	Avg	Lng	TD
2008	Maryland	**13**	6	24	336	14.0	44	2	42	1,089	**25.9**	**99**	1	1	0	0.0	0	0
2009	Maryland	12	10	61	824	13.5	64	5	**51**	**1,309**	25.7	85	**2**	**11**	**59**	**5.4**	**14**	**1**
2010	Maryland	**13**	**12**	**67**	**1,055**	**15.7**	**80**	**12**	30	585	19.5	33	0	9	7	0.8	9	0
Total		38	28	152	2,215	14.6	80	19	123	2,983	24.3	99	3	21	66	3.1	14	1

== Career highlights ==
=== Awards and honors ===
NFL

- 2× Super Bowl champion (XLVII, LII)

College

- NCAA kickoff return yards leader (2009)
- First-team All-ACC (2010)
- Second-team All-ACC (2009)

=== Ravens franchise records ===
Career:

- Yards per reception (minimum 200 receptions), regular season: 17.4
- Yards per reception (minimum ten receptions), playoffs: 20.7

Rookie Season (2011):

- Receptions: 50
- Receiving yards per game: 52.6
- Receiving touchdowns: 7 (shared with Marlon Brown and Marquise Brown)
- Games with 100+ yards receiving: 2
- Games with 3+ total touchdowns: 1

Single game, rookie:

- Receiving yards: 165 (November 20, 2011, against the Cincinnati Bengals)
- Receiving touchdowns: 3 (September 25, 2011, against the St. Louis Rams)
- Total touchdowns: 3 (September 25, 2011, against the St. Louis Rams)

== Post-football career and honors ==
Smith founded the non-profit Torrey Smith Foundation (TSF), whose mission is to provide support to at-risk youth with physical, educational, and financial challenges, and to focus on the enhancement of lives of those affected by domestic violence. It sponsors back-to-school and after-school activities, STEM camps, charitable basketball games and holiday meal and gift programs, among other activities. The TSF's website states its goals as: Education of youth on subjects useful to the individual and beneficial to the community, Increasing the awareness of financial and hands on support needed in the fight against domestic violence and supporting other organizations conducting charitable activities that align with the TSF mission. For the past two years, Torrey has participated in the Madieu Williams Football Camp, a free camp held by the former Bengals and Vikings safety for kids ages 6–14.

In March 2013, Smith worked as an intern for Maryland Rep. Elijah Cummings, working out of Baltimore. On March 28, 2013, the Ravens picked Smith to represent the team at the Maryland State capital in Annapolis. Smith, along with Ravens' president Dick Cass spoke to the assembled members of the Maryland House of Delegates and then the Maryland State Senate. While a member of the San Francisco 49ers in 2016, Smith was the team's nominee for that year's Walter Payton award for his community involvement.

In 2019, his hometown, Colonial Beach named a park whose restoration and expansion he had funded in Smith's honor. In 2020, the Library of Virginia announced Smith as one of its Strong Men & Women in Virginia History, based on his continuing philanthropic work.

In December 2020, Smith joined Rose Health as an Investor and Brand Ambassador to promote mental health resilience. Rose Health is one of the fastest growing mental health platforms in the United States. Smith has said "the sky is the limit" as to Rose's potential for growth. Smith also said the Rose app has helped him with his own mental health, including figuring out his strengths and weaknesses and how to build his mental health resilience.

== Personal life ==
On September 23, 2012, Smith lost his 19-year-old brother in a motorcycle accident. Tevin Chris Jones was riding on SR 672 in Westmoreland County, Virginia, when he ran off the right side of the roadway and struck a utility pole, according to the Virginia State Police. He was pronounced dead at the scene. He was wearing a helmet, and alcohol was not a factor. Smith has established a college scholarship fund to assist low-income youth from Maryland, Pennsylvania and Virginia in honor of his late brother.

Smith left the Ravens' hotel on Sunday at 2 a.m. ET, accompanied by a member of the Ravens' security staff, to be with his family. Smith told Ravens coach John Harbaugh that he wanted to play in that night's game against the New England Patriots. Harbaugh told him that it was Smith's call to make. Smith chose to play, and finished the game with 6 receptions for 127 yards and two touchdowns in a 31–30 win over the New England Patriots.

Smith married his longtime girlfriend, Chanel Williams, on July 11, 2013. The two met at the University of Maryland, where Williams ran track and Smith played football. On September 30, 2013, Smith tweeted that his wife was pregnant. On April 4, 2014, Chanel gave birth to their first child, a son named Torrey "TJ" Jeremiah. Torrey's second son, Kameron James, was born on June 22, 2016. The Smiths' third child, daughter Kori Lynn Smith, was born on December 18, 2018.

He runs a YouTube channel https://www.youtube.com/@TorreySmithWR documenting adventures with his family and another YouTube channel for his organization LEVEL82 https://www.youtube.com/@LEVEL82
