= Mile High Miracle =

Notable NFL playoff game

2012 AFC Divisional playoff
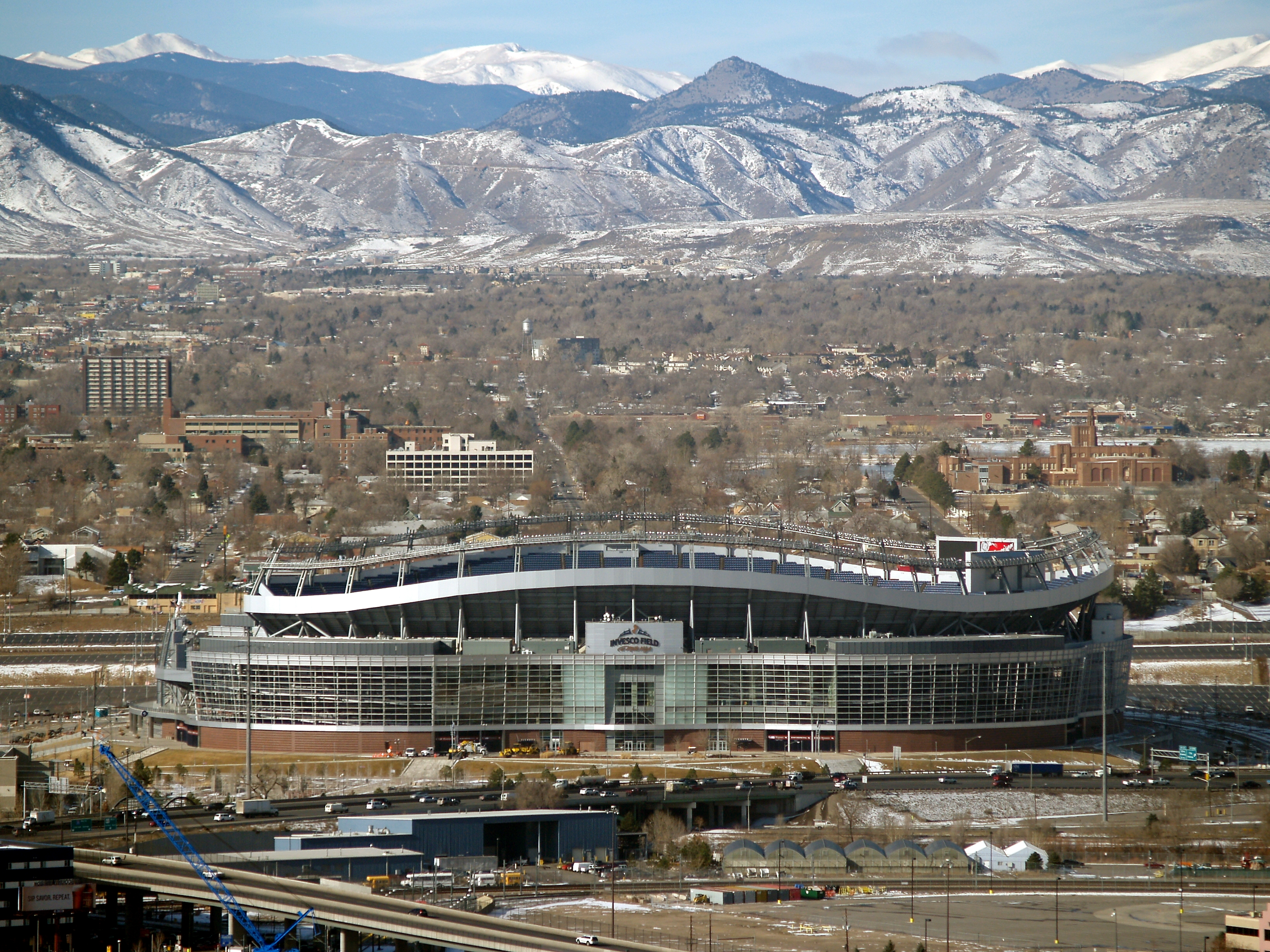
- Denver's Sports Authority Field at Mile High, the site of the game, as seen in 2009.
Baltimore Ravens (4) (10–6)	Denver Broncos (1) (13–3)
38	35
Head coach: John Harbaugh	Head coach: John Fox
	1	2	3	4	OT	2OT	Total
BAL	14	7	7	7	0	3	38
DEN	14	7	7	7	0	0	35
- Date: January 12, 2013, 2:30 PM MST
- Stadium: Sports Authority Field at Mile High; Denver, Colorado
- Favorite: Broncos by 9
- Referee: Bill Vinovich
- Attendance: 76,732

TV in the United States
- Network: CBS
- Announcers: Greg Gumbel, Dan Dierdorf and Solomon Wilcots

The Mile High Miracle refers both to the NFL 2012 AFC Divisional playoff game between the Baltimore Ravens and Denver Broncos on January 12, 2013, and its defining play, a game-tying 70-yard touchdown pass from Baltimore quarterback Joe Flacco to receiver Jacoby Jones with under a minute left in regulation. Playing on the road against the heavily favored Broncos, who had decisively defeated the struggling Ravens late in the regular season while on an 11-game winning streak, Flacco and the Ravens forced the Peyton Manning-led Broncos into double overtime, when rookie kicker Justin Tucker kicked a 47-yard field goal to secure a 38–35 win. With 28 points scored in the first eleven minutes of the game, three return touchdowns, three lead changes, and single-digit temperatures, the game was described by Sports Illustrated as "one of the most exciting and entertaining postseason games in NFL history." The Ravens would go on to beat the New England Patriots, and two weeks later, defeat the San Francisco 49ers in Super Bowl XLVII for the franchise's second championship.

The Mile High Miracle was ranked #1 on NFL.com's Top 20 NFL Games of 2012. The game was described as "a contest that had everything: two special teams touchdowns, two bombs for scores and a pick-six – all without disintegrating into one of those nobody-can-stop-anybody affairs. The defenses did not play poorly; this was not a track meet. It had some balance."

As of 2023, it is the 4th-longest game in NFL history, and the most recent NFL game to go into double overtime. It is often considered the greatest NFL game of the 2010s, and one of the greatest games of all time.

== Background ==
=== Baltimore Ravens ===
After a solid 9-2 start, the Ravens lost two straight games to fall to 9-4, firing their offensive coordinator Cam Cameron as a result. They headed into their matchup hosting Denver on December 16 in a week 15 matchup carrying heavy post-season implications. Denver took an early 10-0 lead that the Ravens would not be able to close. An opportunity for the Ravens to make their way back into contention for the game came late in the second half, but was eliminated when Broncos' cornerback Chris Harris returned a red zone pass from Joe Flacco 98 yards for a touchdown. Baltimore would ultimately suffer a 34–17 defeat.

Though the Ravens would receive the consolation prize of a guaranteed playoff berth later that day, due to a loss by the Pittsburgh Steelers, the team's recent performance (extending a three-game losing streak) led to criticisms of Joe Flacco specifically, and generally about the team's strength after having lost key defensive players due to injuries earlier in the season—to include star linebacker Ray Lewis. Lewis publicly announced his plans to retire shortly after, which buoyed fan support and rallied team morale. The following week, Baltimore clinched a playoff spot and the division with a win over the New York Giants, the defending champions. They finished the season with a 10–6 record and resurged momentum going into the post-season, defeating the Indianapolis Colts in the Wild Card round.

=== Denver Broncos ===
After the blockbuster signing of Peyton Manning during the off season; the Broncos started slowly, losing three of their first five games, including a week 2, 27–21 loss versus the Atlanta Falcons at the Georgia Dome. In that game, Manning struggled in front of a Monday Night Football audience, as he was intercepted three times in the first quarter. After the loss to the New England Patriots in week 5, they wouldn't lose another game for the rest of the 2012 regular season. They won their final eleven games, including an improbable come back win in Qualcomm Stadium against their AFC West rival, the San Diego Chargers, on a week 6 MNF showdown. They also defeated the Baltimore Ravens 34–17 on week 15 at M&T Bank Stadium. On December 2, they clinched the AFC West division championship with a win over the Tampa Bay Buccaneers, and achieved a first round bye and home field advantage on December 30, with a win over the Kansas City Chiefs, and were helped by the Indianapolis Colts, who defeated the Houston Texans earlier that day.

== Game summary ==
=== First quarter ===
The temperature at kickoff was 13 °F (−10.6 °C) with a wind chill of 2 °F (-16.7 °C), making it the coldest playoff game ever played in Denver, which forced Broncos quarterback Peyton Manning to wear gloves.

Following a Ravens punt on their opening possession, Broncos wide receiver Trindon Holliday scored first by returning a Sam Koch punt 90 yards for a touchdown, the first postseason punt return score in franchise history. Things seemed to get even better for Denver when Ravens receiver Jacoby Jones fumbled the ensuing kickoff and was downed on the 6-yard line. However, two plays later, on a Ravens third down, Broncos defensive back Tony Carter was called for defensive pass interference, giving the Ravens 25 yards and a first down. Ravens quarterback Joe Flacco then tied the game with a 59-yard touchdown pass to Torrey Smith. The situation only got worse for Denver on the next drive when Corey Graham intercepted a Manning pass tipped by Eric Decker and returned it 39 yards for a touchdown, giving the Ravens a 14–7 lead. At the end of the quarter, Manning rallied his team back, completing 5/7 passes for 69 yards on a 74-yard drive that ended on his 15-yard touchdown pass to Brandon Stokley, tying the game at 14-14 going into the second quarter.

=== Second quarter ===
Late in the second quarter, a 32-yard reception by Broncos receiver Eric Decker set up Manning's 14-yard touchdown pass to running back Knowshon Moreno. Denver then forced a punt and, on the ensuing possession, drove to the Ravens' 34-yard line. However, the Broncos failed to score as Matt Prater's foot hit the ground during a 52-yard field goal attempt, causing the field goal to miss wide, leaving the Broncos without points on the drive and giving the ball back to the Ravens. Taking the ball back on their own 42 with 1:16 remaining, Flacco hit Anquan Boldin for 11 yards and tight end Dennis Pitta for 15 yards before finding Torrey Smith in the end zone on a 32-yard score, tying the score at 21 at the end of the half.

=== Third quarter ===
Holliday quickly broke the tie just 13 seconds into the third quarter by returning the second half kickoff 104 yards for a touchdown, making him the first player ever to return both a punt and a kickoff for a touchdown in a postseason game. Later in the quarter, Manning lost a fumble while being sacked by Pernell McPhee, and Ravens lineman Paul Kruger recovered it on the Broncos' 37-yard line. The play was reviewed because of the tuck rule, but referee Bill Vinovich upheld the ruling on the field that the result of the play was a fumble. This play became the last play ever reviewed under the tuck rule since it was abolished in 2013. Running back Ray Rice took it to the end zone from there with five consecutive running plays (one of them for 32 yards), the last one a 1-yard touchdown run to tie the game back up at 28.

=== Fourth quarter ===
Midway through the fourth quarter, Denver drove 88 yards and scored on a 17-yard pass from Manning to Demaryius Thomas, taking a 35–28 lead with just over seven minutes left in regulation. Baltimore responded with a drive to the Broncos 31-yard line, but turned the ball over on downs with 3:16 left. The Ravens defense had to use all their timeouts on Denver's ensuing drive, but managed to force a punt and get the ball on their own 23-yard line at the 1:09 mark. Flacco then threw an incomplete pass and scrambled for seven yards, setting up third-and-three from the Baltimore 30-yard line with 44 seconds remaining.

==== 70-yard touchdown pass ====
The Ravens went out with a three wideout set, with Boldin and Smith to the left and Jones out right. Tight end Dennis Pitta was also lined up in the slot while Flacco was back in the shotgun. Expecting an obvious pass play, the Broncos played seven defensive backs, including safeties Rahim Moore, Mike Adams, David Bruton, and Jim Leonhard.

When the play began the Broncos would rush three defenders. Elvis Dumervil successfully pushed Ravens left tackle Bryant McKinnie into the backfield. Robert Ayers would manage to spin past center Matt Birk and right guard Marshal Yanda, gaining penetration through the gap between Yanda and right tackle Michael Oher. Meanwhile, Von Miller would soon shed Oher's block. To avoid the defenders Flacco would be forced to step forward into the pocket, then slide to his left, and ultimately throw the ball earlier than intended. Flacco's preference is to bail out to a deep route. Accordingly, he sent the ball down field for Jones to chase down.

Broncos cornerback Tony Carter was assigned both to jam Jones at the line of scrimmage, and then to follow Jones up the sidelines if there was no eligible receiver in the flat. He failed on both counts. This left Moore and Leonhard to defend Jones' route. But with both defensive backs expecting Flacco to throw for the first down marker, neither was well positioned to defend a deep pass. Moore had been assigned the deepest zone, but on his way to the ball he made a bad read on the flight of the ball attempting to leap and try knocking the pass away, falling down in the process. Jones caught the ball at the 20 yard line and made it to the end zone unimpeded.

=== Overtime periods ===
After the first three drives of overtime ended in punts, Corey Graham made his second interception of a pass from Manning intended for Stokley on the Broncos 45-yard line. On the last play of the first overtime period, Rice's 11-yard run moved the Ravens into field goal range. Four plays later, rookie kicker Justin Tucker kicked a 47-yard field goal to win the game.

=== Statistics ===
AFC Divisional Playoff Game: #4 Baltimore Ravens at #1 Denver Broncos – Game summary

Quarter	1	2	3	4	OT	2OT	Total
Ravens	14	7	7	7	0	3	38
Broncos	14	7	7	7	0	0	35

at Sports Authority Field at Mile High, Denver, Colorado

- Date: January 12, 2013
- Game time: 4:30 pm. EST/2:30 p.m. MST
- Game weather: 13 °F (−11 °C), partly cloudy
- Game attendance: 76,732
- Referee: Bill Vinovich
- TV announcers (CBS): Greg Gumbel, Dan Dierdorf and Solomon Wilcots

Game information

First quarter

- DEN – Trindon Holliday 90-yard punt return, Matt Prater XP good, 12:32 (DEN 0–7)
- BAL – Torrey Smith 59-yard pass from Joe Flacco, Justin Tucker XP good, 10:39 (BAL 7–7)
- BAL – Corey Graham 39-yard interception return, Justin Tucker XP good, 9:58 (BAL 14–7)
- DEN – Brandon Stokley 15-yard pass from Peyton Manning, Matt Prater XP good, 4:09 (DEN 14–14)

Second quarter

- DEN – Knowshon Moreno 14-yard pass from Peyton Manning, Matt Prater XP good, 7:32 (DEN 14–21)
- BAL – Torrey Smith 32-yard pass from Joe Flacco, Justin Tucker XP good, 0:43 (BAL 21–21)

Third quarter

- DEN – Trindon Holliday 104-yard kickoff return, Matt Prater XP good, 15:00 (DEN 21–28)
- BAL – Ray Rice 1-yard run, Justin Tucker XP good, 0:23 (BAL 28–28)

Fourth quarter

- DEN – Demaryius Thomas 17-yard pass from Peyton Manning, Matt Prater XP good, 7:18 (DEN 28–35)
- BAL – Jacoby Jones 70-yard pass from Joe Flacco, Justin Tucker XP good, 0:41 (BAL 35–35)

Overtime

- No scoring plays.

Second overtime

- BAL – Justin Tucker 47-yard field goal, 13:24 (BAL 38–35)

Top passers

- BAL – Joe Flacco (18–34, 331 yards, 3 TD)
- DEN – Peyton Manning (28–43, 290 yards, 3 TD, 2 INT)

Top rushers

- BAL – Ray Rice (30 rushes, 131 yards, TD)
- DEN – Ronnie Hillman (22 rushes, 83 yards)

Top receivers

- BAL – Torrey Smith (3 rec, 98 yards, 2 TD)
- DEN – Eric Decker (6 rec, 84 yards)

== Notable performances ==
=== Joe Flacco ===
The game was hailed as a breakout performance for Flacco, who had "outgunned" Tom Brady and Peyton Manning in back-to-back postseason trips. The Associated Press ran an article stating "Welcome to NFL immortality, Joe Flacco," and compared his 70-yard touchdown pass to Roger Staubach's Hail Mary and Franco Harris's Immaculate Reception. ESPN analyst and former quarterback Ron Jaworski said, "That was certainly one of the most remarkable throws in Ravens history and one of the best throws I've ever seen." According to ESPN Stats & Information's win probability model, Denver had a 97.2 percent chance of winning the game prior to the touchdown. Retiring linebacker Ray Lewis said of Flacco, "He grew up today," and noted that before the game he had told his quarterback, "'You're the general now. Lead us to victory. You lead us today. I'm just here to facilitate things.'" Flacco threw for 331 yards and three touchdowns, with no interceptions and a fumble that he lost.

=== Torrey Smith ===
Ravens wide receiver Torrey Smith, matched up against all-Pro cornerback Champ Bailey, caught three passes for 98 yards, his two touchdowns on receptions over twenty yards. The Broncos defense had allowed only three such touchdowns all season.

=== Corey Graham ===
Ravens cornerback Corey Graham finished with eight tackles and two interceptions, the first he returned 39 yards for a touchdown, and the second in overtime, which led to the Ravens game-winning field goal. He was also named the "CBS Player of the Game" for his performance.

=== Peyton Manning ===
Manning finished 28/43 for 290 yards and three touchdowns, with two interceptions (one of which being the 39 yard pick-six by Graham) and two fumbles, one that he lost.

=== Jacoby Jones ===
Jacoby Jones was on the receiving end of the "Mile High Miracle" play that forced the game into overtime. Jones finished the game with 2 receptions for 77 yards and 1 touchdown, plus 74 return yards on kickoff and punt returns.

=== Trindon Holliday ===
Holliday's 90-yard punt return and 104-yard kickoff return were the longest ever in each NFL postseason category (with the latter broken just three weeks later by Jacoby Jones in Super Bowl XLVII). His 248 total special teams return yards were an NFL postseason record as well, breaking the previous record of 244 return yards jointly held by Andre Coleman in Super Bowl XXIX and Desmond Howard in Super Bowl XXXI.

== Starting lineups ==
The starting lineups for the game were:

Baltimore	Position	Position	Denver
OFFENSE
Torrey Smith	WR		Demaryius Thomas
Bryant McKinnie	LT		Ryan Clady
Kelechi Osemele	LG		Zane Beadles
Matt Birk	C		Dan Koppen
Marshal Yanda	RG		Chris Kuper
Michael Oher	RT		Orlando Franklin
Ed Dickson	TE		Joel Dreessen
Anquan Boldin	WR		Eric Decker
Joe Flacco	QB	WR	Brandon Stokley
Vonta Leach	FB	QB	Peyton Manning
Ray Rice	RB		Knowshon Moreno
DEFENSE
Haloti Ngata	DT	LDE	Derek Wolfe
Ma'ake Kemoeatu	NT	DT	Kevin Vickerson
Paul Kruger	DE	NT	Justin Bannan
Terrell Suggs	OLB	RDE	Elvis Dumervil
Danell Ellerbe	ILB	OLB	Von Miller
Ray Lewis	ILB	ILB	Keith Brooking
Corey Graham	LCB	OLB	Wesley Woodyard
Cary Williams	RCB	LCB	Champ Bailey
Bernard Pollard	SS	RCB	Chris Harris
Chykie Brown	CB	SS	Mike Adams
Ed Reed	FS		Rahim Moore

== Officials ==
- Referee: Bill Vinovich (#52)
- Umpire: Undrey Wash (#96)
- Head linesman: George Hayward (#54)
- Line judge: Ron Marinucci (#107)
- Field judge: Bob Waggoner (#25)
- Side judge: Ronald Torbert (#62)
- Back judge: Billy Smith (#2)

== Aftermath and legacy ==
The Ravens went on to avenge the previous year's AFC Championship Game loss to the New England Patriots with a 28–13 win and went on to defeat the San Francisco 49ers (coached by Jim Harbaugh, the brother of Ravens coach John Harbaugh) in Super Bowl XLVII, 34–31. Jacoby Jones continued his postseason success in the Super Bowl with a touchdown reception and a kick-off return for a touchdown. Following the season, he competed on the sixteenth season of Dancing with the Stars. He was the highest-placed male contestant and came in third overall behind winner Kellie Pickler and runner-up Zendaya.

The loss made a disappointing end for the Broncos, for whom there were high hopes after Manning's comeback season and an 11-game winning streak. Manning was criticized for throwing a pair of interceptions in his eighth time exiting a postseason without a win, tying him with Brett Favre for the most career post-season losses by a starting quarterback. Broncos head coach John Fox was blamed for his "ultra conservative" playcalling, particularly for not using the two-minute drill. Nearing the end of the first half, with the game tied and three time-outs available, Fox had Manning hand the ball off to his running back before running out the clock. At the end of regulation, with 2:30 remaining, Fox called three running plays up the middle and after the Jones' touchdown, made Manning take a knee with 31 seconds to play in regulation and 2 timeouts remaining.

At 76 minutes and 42 seconds, the game is the 4th-longest in NFL history and was the sixth double overtime game in history, the first since the 2003 NFC Divisional playoff game between the St. Louis Rams and the Carolina Panthers, which coincidentally also featured John Fox.

By virtue of winning Super Bowl XLVII, the Ravens were scheduled to host the Kickoff Game on Thursday, September 5, 2013. However, due to a scheduling conflict with the Baltimore Orioles (with whom they share a parking lot), the Ravens were the first Super Bowl champions in 10 years not to host the following year's Kickoff Game. The 2013 Kickoff Game was instead played at Sports Authority Field at Mile High in a rematch with the Broncos and resulted in a 49–27 win for the Broncos where Manning threw a record 7 touchdown passes en route to a record setting 55 touchdown passes while leading the Broncos to Super Bowl XLVIII.

After the 2018 season, which saw Flacco lose the Ravens starting quarterback job to Lamar Jackson, he would be traded to the Broncos.
