= Marlon Brown =

American football player (born 1991)

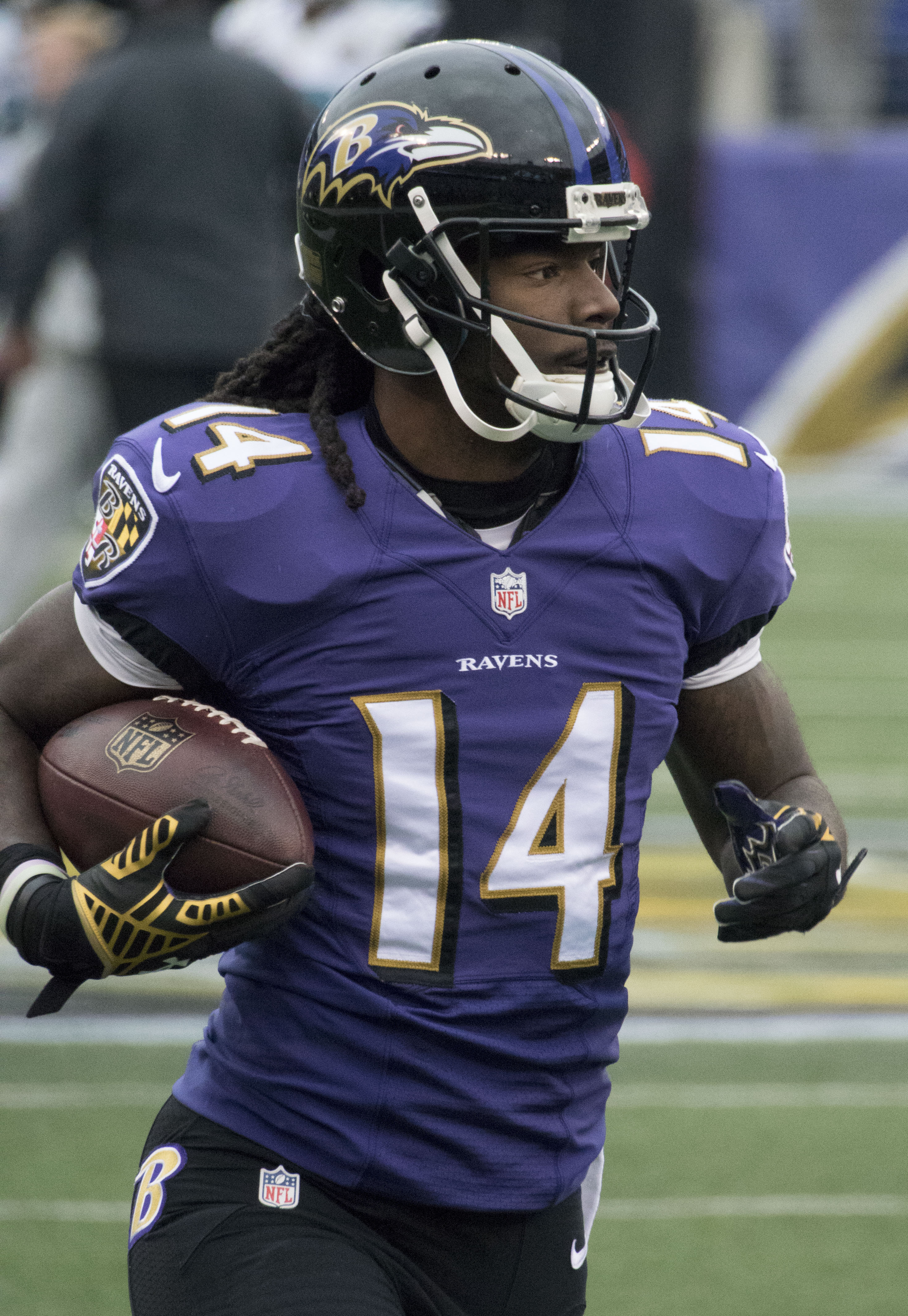
- Brown with the Baltimore Ravens in 2014

No. 14
- Position: Wide receiver

Personal information
- Born: April 22, 1991 (age 35); Memphis, Tennessee, U.S.
- Listed height: 6 ft 5 in (1.96 m)
- Listed weight: 214 lb (97 kg)

Career information
- High school: Harding Academy of Memphis (Memphis)
- College: Georgia
- NFL draft: 2013: undrafted

Career history
- Baltimore Ravens (2013–2015); Denver Broncos (2016); Chicago Bears (2018)

Career NFL statistics
- Receptions: 87
- Receiving yards: 891
- Receiving touchdowns: 7
- Stats at Pro Football Reference

Marlon D. Brown (born April 22, 1991) is an American former professional football player who was a wide receiver in the National Football League (NFL). He signed with the Baltimore Ravens as an undrafted free agent in 2013. He played college football for the Georgia Bulldogs.

== Early career ==
He attended Harding Academy of Memphis in Memphis, Tennessee. He was selected to the 2009 USA Today All-USA Second-team. He also was selected to the 2008 Atlanta Journal-Constitution Super Southern 100. He was named to the 2007 Tennessee Sports Writers Association Division 2-A All-State.

In 2009, he was a recipient of the Vickie and Leon Farmer Football Scholarship. In 2010, he was selected as team's Most Improved Player Award.

== Professional career ==
=== Baltimore Ravens ===
==== 2013 season ====
On April 28, 2013, Brown signed with the Baltimore Ravens as an undrafted free agent following the 2013 NFL draft. Brown was one of the two rookie free agents to make the 53-man opening day roster. Brown made his NFL debut against the Denver Broncos on September 5, 2013. In that game, Brown recorded his first-career reception and his first-career touchdown. In Week 14 of the 2013 season, he caught the game-winning touchdown from quarterback Joe Flacco with four seconds remaining in regulation for a 29–26 victory over the Minnesota Vikings; Brown won NFL Rookie of the Week honors for his performance. Brown led the Ravens in receiving touchdowns and tied the Ravens rookie record for receiving touchdowns in a season with seven, achieving that record against the Cincinnati Bengals; Brown also became the first rookie in Ravens franchise history to score a touchdown in each of his first two career games. He finished the season with 49 receptions for 524 yards and seven touchdowns, which ranked third, second, and first on the team, respectively.

==== 2014 season ====
In 2014, the Ravens signed wide receiver Steve Smith Sr. and Brown was demoted to backup wide receiver. In Brown's second NFL season, he only had 24 receptions for 255 yards with no touchdowns as part of an offense that broke franchise single-season records in yards (5,838) and points scored (409). Brown started his first-career post-season game against the New England Patriots on January 10, 2015. In two playoff games, he caught six passes for 48 yards.

==== 2015 season ====
Brown suffered a back injury in a Week 11 win against the St. Louis Rams. Brown was inactive for every game until December 29, 2015, when he was placed on injured reserve, ending his season. The injury ended Brown's third season in the NFL with 14 receptions for 112 yards on 30 targets for zero touchdowns.

=== Denver Broncos ===
Brown signed a one-year contract with the Denver Broncos on July 27, 2016. On August 4, 2016, Brown was waived due to a back injury he suffered during training camp. He was re-signed by the Broncos on November 21, 2016. He was placed on injured reserve on December 10, 2016.

Following the pre-season, on September 2, 2017, Brown was released by the Broncos.

=== Chicago Bears ===
On April 19, 2018, Brown signed with the Chicago Bears. Following the pre-season, on September 1, 2018, he was placed on injured reserve with a concussion. He was released on October 16, 2018.
