= 2011 Orange Bowl =

2011 Discover Orange Bowl
- BCS Bowl Game; 77th Orange Bowl
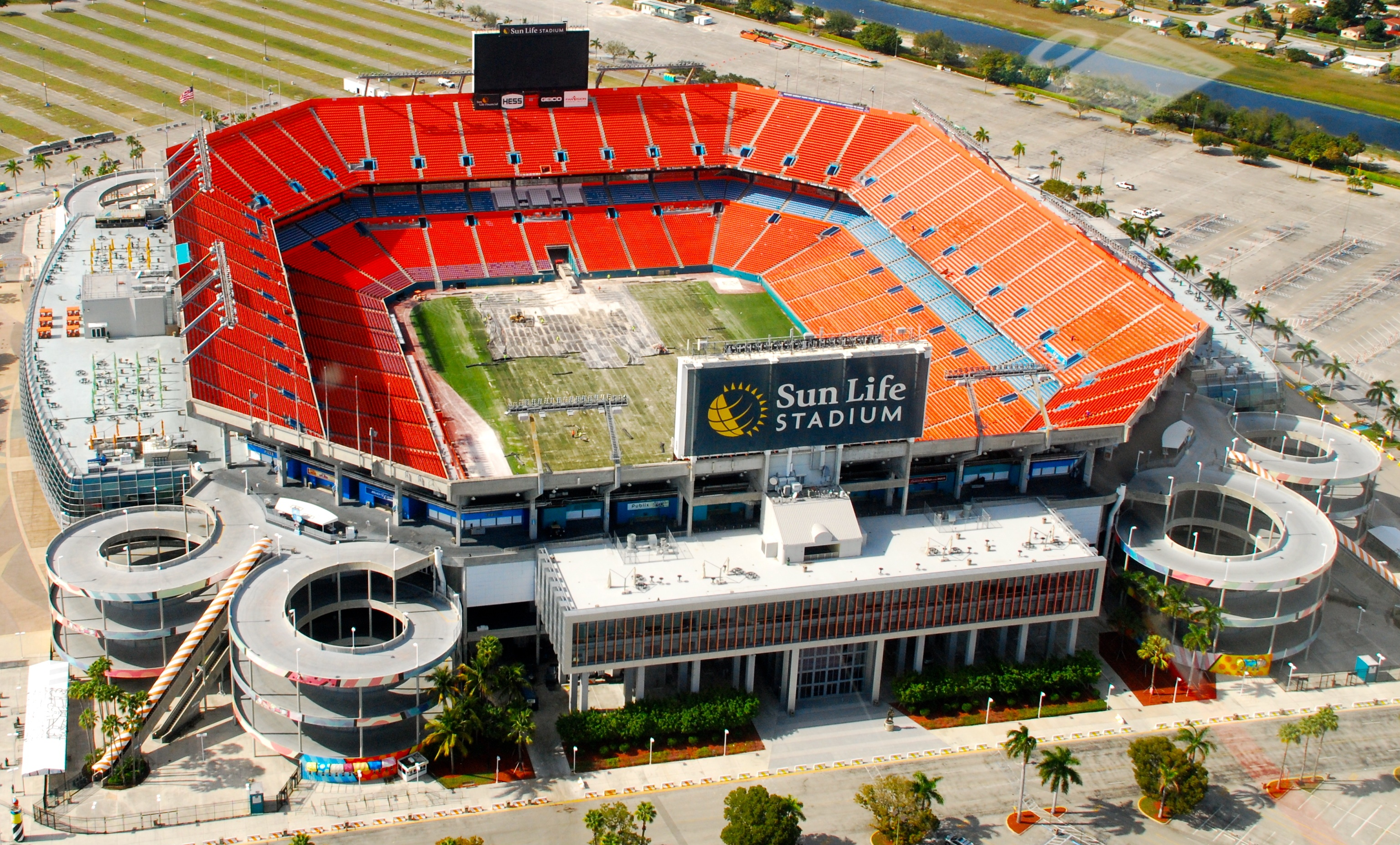
- Sun Life Stadium in Miami Gardens, Florida, hosted the Orange Bowl.
Stanford Cardinal	Virginia Tech Hokies
(11–1)	(11–2)
Pacific-10	ACC
40	12
Head coach: Jim Harbaugh	Head coach: Frank Beamer
AP / Coaches / BCS; 5 / 5 / 4	AP / Coaches / BCS; 12 / 11 / 13
	1	2	3	4	Total
Stanford	7	6	13	14	40
Virginia Tech	2	10	0	0	12
- Date: January 3, 2011
- Season: 2010
- Stadium: Sun Life Stadium
- Location: Miami Gardens, Florida, US
- MVP: Andrew Luck (QB, Stanford)
- Favorite: Stanford by 3 or 3.5 (58.5)
- National anthem: Little Big Town
- Referee: Tom Walker (Big 12 Conference)
- Halftime show: Goo Goo Dolls
- Attendance: 65,453 (Note: Tickets sold.)
- Payout: US$21.2 million (per conference)

United States TV coverage
- Network: ESPN
- Announcers: Mike Tirico (Play by Play); Ron Jaworski (Analyst); Jon Gruden (Analyst); Michele Tafoya (Sideline)
- Nielsen ratings: 7.1 (10.7 million)

The 2011 Discover Orange Bowl was a postseason college football bowl game between the Virginia Tech Hokies and the Stanford Cardinal on Monday, January 3, 2011, at Sun Life Stadium in Miami Gardens, Florida, United States. Stanford defeated Virginia Tech 40–12. The game was part of the 2010–2011 Bowl Championship Series of the 2010 NCAA Division I FBS football season and was the concluding game of the season for both teams. The game, the 77th edition of the Orange Bowl, was televised in the United States on ESPN and the broadcast was seen by an estimated 8.23 million viewers.

Virginia Tech was selected to participate in the Orange Bowl after an 11–2 regular season that culminated with a 44–33 win in the 2010 ACC Championship Game. Stanford was picked as the other half of the matchup following an 11–1 campaign that included the school's best-ever regular-season record. That performance earned the Cardinal a No. 4 ranking in the BCS Poll and the automatic bid to a BCS game that accompanies a top-4 ranking of a second school in a conference other than the champion. In the weeks before that game, media attention focused on both teams' turnarounds from historical difficulties and the performance of Stanford quarterback Andrew Luck. The game also was the first Orange Bowl not sponsored by FedEx in 21 years, ending the longest-running title sponsorship deal among the major bowls.

The game kicked off at 8:39 pm in warm weather, and Stanford scored first, a touchdown, with its third offensive possession. Virginia Tech briefly took the lead with a safety followed by a touchdown of its own, but Stanford restored a 13–12 advantage before halftime. In the second half, Stanford pulled away from Virginia Tech as it scored 13 points in the third quarter and 14 in the fourth while holding the Hokies scoreless.

In recognition of his performance during the game, Stanford quarterback Andrew Luck was named the game's most valuable player. He set a Stanford bowl-game record for touchdowns, and threw three of those scores to tight end Coby Fleener, who set a Stanford and Orange Bowl record with 173 receiving yards. Both teams made coaching changes after the game, as Stanford head coach Jim Harbaugh left the team to coach the National Football League's San Francisco 49ers and Virginia Tech replaced several assistant coaches. Players from each team were selected in the 2011 NFL draft.

== Team selection ==
The Orange Bowl is one of five Bowl Championship Series (BCS) bowl games that have been played at the conclusion of every college football season since 2006. (Note: Between 1998 and 2006, there were four BCS games.) As defined by contract, the bowl matches the champion of the Atlantic Coast Conference (ACC) against an at-large pick chosen by a special committee. On December 4, 2010, the Virginia Tech Hokies defeated the Florida State Seminoles in the 2010 ACC Championship Game, thus winning an automatic bid to the 2011 Orange Bowl.

The at-large spot in the Orange Bowl was filled via a round-robin selection procedure defined by the other Bowl Championship series games (the Sugar, Fiesta, and Rose bowls) and the automatic bids. If a game's automatic bid team is selected for the BCS National Championship Game, it is allowed to select a replacement team. In the 2010 season, teams otherwise designated for the Rose Bowl and Sugar Bowl were picked for the national championship game. Following the two compensatory selections are the at-large picks. The order of at-large selections rotates annually among the BCS bowls.

For the January 2011 games, the Sugar Bowl selected first, followed by the Orange Bowl and Fiesta Bowl. The Sugar Bowl picked Ohio State, which left the Orange Bowl to decide between two teams contractually bound to appear in a BCS bowl game. These were Stanford, which was guaranteed a BCS bid by its No. 4 national ranking, and Connecticut, champion of the Big East Conference. Favoring Stanford's potential to draw a large television audience, the Orange Bowl selected the Cardinal, leaving Connecticut to the Fiesta Bowl.

=== Stanford ===
The Stanford Cardinal began the 2010 season after going 8–5 in 2009 under freshman quarterback Andrew Luck. The 2009 season saw the Cardinal defeat eighth-ranked Oregon and No. 9 USC en route to breaking a seven-year bowl game drought with an appearance in the 2009 Sun Bowl against Oklahoma. Stanford changed several position coaches and its defensive strategy in the offseason, and though the Cardinal returned 17 of 24 possible players from the previous year's starting lineup, few believed the Cardinal would be among the best teams in the country. In the annual preseason poll of media members covering the Pacific-10, Stanford was picked to finish fourth in the 10-team conference. Nationally, Stanford appeared in the "also receiving votes" categories of the preseason polls. In the AP Poll, the team was 27th; in the coaches' poll, the Cardinal was 32nd.

The Cardinal opened the season by defeating Football Bowl Subdivision team Sacramento State, then beat conference opponent UCLA in the first Pacific-10 game of the season. The win over Sacramento State pushed Stanford to No. 25 nationally, and the win over UCLA raised Stanford to No. 19, the rank it held when it defeated Atlantic Coast Conference foe Wake Forest 68–24 on September 18. The following week, Stanford defeated Notre Dame as the nation's No. 16 team, and the win raised the Cardinal to No. 9.

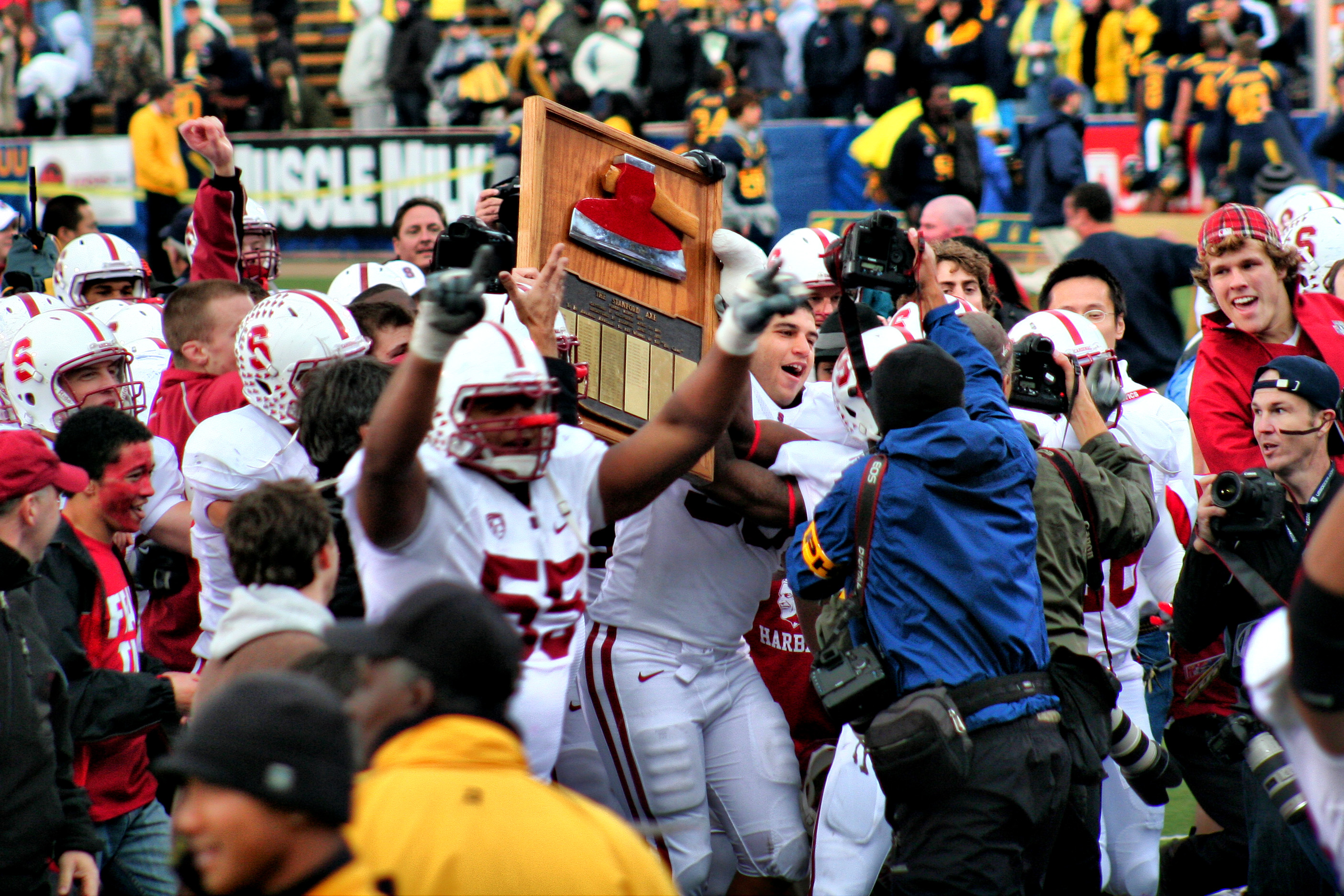
Stanford players lift the Stanford Axe after winning the 2010 Big Game against the California Golden Bears.

On October 2, No. 9 Stanford played No. 4 Oregon. The game was touted as a matchup between two of the top offenses in college football and was nationally televised. Stanford led 21–3 after the first quarter and 31–24 at halftime, but the Cardinal allowed 28 unanswered points in the second half and lost to Oregon, 52–31. Oregon later went on to play in the BCS National Championship game, and the defeat was Stanford's only one of the season. The loss dropped Stanford to No. 16 in the polls, but the team rebounded the following week to defeat USC on a last-second field goal, 37–35.

The victory over USC began a winning streak, the best in Stanford football history since the time of the Korean War. The week after beating USC, Stanford defeated Washington State, moving to a 6–1 record for the first time since 1970. The Cardinal rose to No. 13 nationally and defeated the University of Washington on October 30. Against No. 15 Arizona, Stanford matched its previous season's win total. On November 13, Stanford defeated Arizona State in a closely fought 17–13 win that brought the Cardinal football team to 9–1 and its best record since 1951. The following week, Stanford beat traditional rival California in The Big Game by a 48–14 score. It was the largest margin of victory in the rivalry since 1930. Stanford's final regular-season game was against the Oregon State Beavers, and Stanford won the contest convincingly, 38–0. The No. 4 and No. 5 nationally ranked teams had lost earlier the same day, lifting Stanford in the polls and in position for a Bowl Championship Series game berth.

=== Virginia Tech ===
The Virginia Tech Hokies entered the 2010 season after a 2009 campaign that saw the team finish 10–3, including a season-ending win in the 2009 Chick-fil-A Bowl against the Tennessee Volunteers. Because of that season-ending victory and the Hokies' general good performance during the 2009 season, Virginia Tech was ranked No. 10 in preseason national polling. The Hokies' first game of the season was a nationally televised contest against then-No. 3 Boise State at FedExField near Washington, D.C.. Because the game was the first of the season to feature two top-10 teams, it received large amounts of media coverage. During the game, Virginia Tech fell behind 17–0 in the first quarter, but rallied to take a 21–20 lead early in the third quarter. The two teams traded the lead, alternating scoring drives until Boise State scored a touchdown with 1:06 remaining. Virginia Tech was unable to reply one final time, and Boise State earned a 33–30 victory.

The close loss discouraged the Virginia Tech players, who then had only five days to prepare for their next opponent, lightly regarded James Madison University. At Lane Stadium, Virginia Tech's home field, James Madison upset the heavily favored Hokies, 21–16. The loss was only the second time in college football history that a team ranked nationally was defeated by a team from the NCAA Football Championship Subdivision. In the wake of the loss, Virginia Tech fell from No. 13 to out of the polls entirely.

Following the loss, seniors on the football team held a players-only meeting in an effort to rally the team. Players later recalled that meeting as the turning point in the team's season. The next week, Virginia Tech earned its first win of the season, a 49–27 victory over East Carolina in Lane Stadium. The Hokies followed that by traveling to Boston College for a 19–0 win, their first shutout since 2006.

The two victories were the start of a winning streak that saw the Hokies complete the regular season without another loss. Following Boston College, they defeated No. 23 NC State in its home stadium, 41–30. They defeated nonconference opponent Central Michigan, then beat conference opponent Wake Forest and re-entered the polls at No. 25. Their position in the polls climbed with each opponent they defeated. They beat Duke as the No. 25 team, Georgia Tech as the No. 23 team, North Carolina as the No. 20 team and No. 23 Miami as the No. 16 team. The Miami victory clinched Tech the division championship and a slot in the ACC championship game, but the Hokies still won their final previously scheduled game, the annual Commonwealth Cup rivalry against Virginia. In the ACC Championship Game, Virginia Tech defeated Florida State 44–33, clinching the ACC's automatic bid to the Orange Bowl.

== Sponsor change ==
In 2008, sports channel ESPN won the right to broadcast Bowl Championship Series games between 2011 and 2014. In compensation, it agreed to pay the BCS $125 million per year, more than a competing bid from Fox ($100 million), which had been paying $82.5 million per year for the contract that ended in 2010. To balance the higher cost of broadcasting the games, ESPN demanded more money for title sponsorship of each game. Shipping company FedEx, which had become the Orange Bowl's title sponsor in 1990 and was the longest continuous sponsor of any bowl game, balked at ESPN's increased demands—about $20 million per year and required advertising outside the Orange Bowl—and ended its sponsorship.

Citi, the title sponsor of the Rose Bowl, likewise ended its sponsorship over the increased cost. ESPN immediately began pursuing an alternative title sponsor for each game. Candy manufacturer The Hershey Company was an early possibility for the Orange Bowl, and the company considered titling the game the Reese's Orange Bowl, but negotiations fell through. In August, ESPN reached a deal with credit card company Discover Financial to make the game the Discover Orange Bowl through 2014.

== Pregame buildup ==
Pregame media coverage of the 2011 Orange Bowl focused on the manner in which the two teams involved had reversed their fortunes during the 2010 college football season. Stanford had its longest winning streak since 1991 its most wins in history, and was four years removed from a one-win season, while Virginia Tech became the first team in college football history to win 11 consecutive games in a season after losing its first two. The two teams had never played each other, but they shared a common 2010 opponent, Wake Forest. Before the Orange Bowl, Wake Forest head coach Jim Grobe said he didn't see much difference in quality. Another point of conversation was the poor performance of the ACC in nonconference games and Virginia Tech's poor past performance against teams ranked in the top 5. The Hokies had won just one of 27 games against teams in that category. Partially because of this factor, spread bettors favored Stanford by three points when the first odds were released December 10, a margin that various organizations either kept constant or raised to 3.5 points by the day of the game. It was the first time all season the Hokies were point spread underdogs.

Two nights before the game, Virginia Tech running back David Wilson and safety Antone Exum missed a 1 am curfew. As punishment, Virginia Tech head coach Frank Beamer suspended the two players for the first quarter of the Orange Bowl.

=== Ticket sales and tourism ===
Virginia Tech and Stanford each were allotted 17,500 tickets to sell through their school box offices, but each school had problems selling that amount. For Stanford, whose primary campus is in California, the distance fans were required to travel was a major obstacle. Stanford head coach Jim Harbaugh said, "It will probably be more Hokie fans there than Stanford fans. That far away from home it probably could be a hostile environment for us."

Orange Bowl organizers predicted that Virginia Tech fans, who were located closer to the site of the game, would be attracted by its proximity and the warm weather offered by southern Florida. Delta Air Lines added more flights from Virginia to Florida in anticipation. To entice more fans to attend, tourism officials planned to step up their advertising in order to boost the economic impact of the event, estimated in 2009 at $200 million. The advertising campaign was a difficult sell because the game was scheduled for the first Monday after New Year's Day, the date when most American workers return to their jobs after the New Year.

Partially because of this fact, ticket sales were slow. By December 23, Tech had sold just 6,500 of its 17,500-seat allotment, while Stanford fans had purchased 9,000 tickets from their allotment. These figures increased slightly as the game day approached, but the schools were hampered by several factors. The tickets assigned to the schools were in less-desirable seats, and many seats were available far more cheaply in the secondary market. In one example, an upper-deck ticket sold by Virginia Tech cost $65, while a similar ticket was available for $12 through an online ticket seller. The two schools were forced to purchase the remaining unsold tickets, costing each several hundred thousand dollars.

=== Stanford offense ===
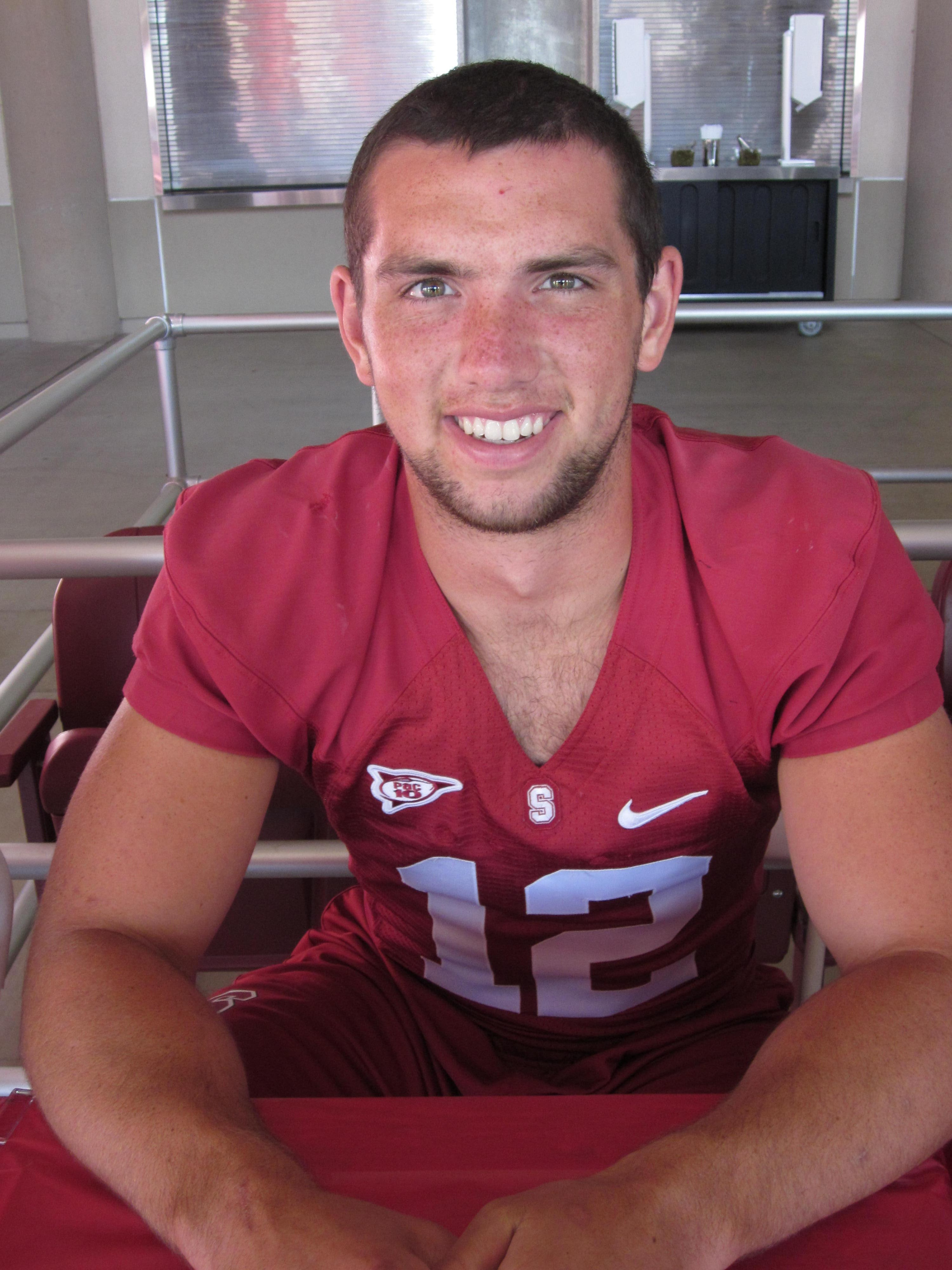
Quarterback Andrew Luck, seen here in August 2010, was the critical component of the Stanford Cardinal offense before and during the 2011 Orange Bowl.

Stanford's offense was commanded by redshirt sophomore quarterback Andrew Luck, who completed 70 percent of his pass attempts, gaining 3,051 yards, 28 touchdowns, and 7 interceptions. The touchdown mark was a Stanford single-season record. He also gained 438 yards running the ball, setting a Stanford record for rushing by a quarterback, and his combined rushing and passing total set a record at Stanford for total offense. On December 13, Luck finished second in the voting for the Heisman Trophy, the annual award given to the best player in college football that season. NCAA rules allow a player three years removed from high school to enter the NFL draft, and even though he was only a sophomore in 2010, he met the three-year standard at the conclusion of the season. Before the Orange Bowl, media and fans speculated as to Luck's likely choice.

Luck distributed his passes relatively evenly among his receivers. Doug Baldwin was the team's leading receiver, with 56 receptions for 824 yards and 9 touchdowns during the regular season. Wide receiver and kick returner Chris Owusu, who played in only six games because of a knee injury, underwent arthroscopic surgery and was expected to play in the Orange Bowl. He was the team's fourth-leading receiver in terms of yardage, catching 24 passes for 394 yards and 3 touchdowns.

Stanford's running game was led statistically by sophomore running back Stepfan Taylor, who garnered 1,023 rushing yards and 15 touchdowns during the regular season. Before the game, Cardinal head coach Jim Harbaugh said he planned to give three other running backs—Tyler Gaffney, Jeremy Stewart, and Anthony Wilkerson—opportunities to carry the ball when Taylor was taken out of the game.

Virginia Tech's success at blocking kicks during the 24 years of head coach Frank Beamer's tenure caused Stanford to spend extra time in pregame practices on kick protection.

Because of his success in guiding Stanford's offense, head coach Harbaugh was mentioned as a candidate for the vacant head coaching positions of other universities and National Football League teams. In the leadup to the Orange Bowl, however, Harbaugh refused to comment on any of the possibilities and said he wanted to focus on guiding his team to victory. Stanford players echoed that line. "We've invested too much to let something like that distract us," linebacker Shayne Skov said December 30.

=== Virginia Tech offense ===
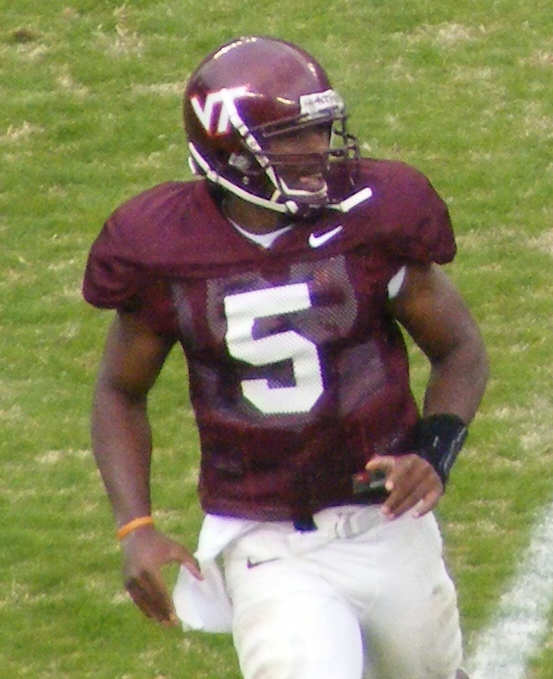
Virginia Tech quarterback Tyrod Taylor was the 2010 Player of the Year in the Atlantic Coast Conference.

Virginia Tech quarterback Tyrod Taylor was the Atlantic Coast Conference Player of the Year and its championship game MVP. According to pregame media coverage, he presented a contrasting style to Stanford's Luck. Taylor gained threw for 2,521 yards and set a school record with 23 passing touchdowns, but was praised primarily for his physical mobility and ability to avoid defensive pressure, something Luck lacked. Taylor's presence was a contributing factor to Tech's offensive success in 2010. Virginia Tech's offense was the most productive since offensive coordinator Bryan Stinespring joined the team in 2001. It set team records for points and total yards, and led the ACC in scoring and red-zone efficiency.

In addition to Taylor's success passing the ball, the Hokies also had a successful running offense. Running back Ryan Williams, who was limited for much of the season because of injury, had 473 rushing yards. Fellow running back Darren Evans, who missed the 2008 season because of injury, gained 817 yards and 11 touchdowns. Sophomore running back David Wilson gained 616 yards. Combined with Taylor's rushing total, Virginia Tech gained 2,543 yards and 30 touchdowns on the ground.

=== Stanford defense ===
In 2010, Stanford's defense improved under new defensive coordinator Vic Fangio, who was given credit for much of the team's success in that department. At the end of the regular season, Stanford was first in the Pac-10 and 11th of 120 teams nationally in scoring defense (allowing an average of 17.83 points per game) and 24th in total defense (permitting 326 yards per game). In 2009, Stanford was 69th in scoring defense (26.5) and 90th in total defense (403 yards per game). A prominent player on Stanford's defense was Owen Marecic, the only person in major league college football that season to play both offense and defense. On defense, Marecic accrued 45 tackles and 2 interceptions as a linebacker; on offense, he gained 117 yards and 4 touchdowns as the team's fullback.

Stanford's leading tackler was linebacker Shayne Skov, who accumulated 72 tackles despite missing the first two games of the season. Before the game, Skov said one of Stanford's priorities would be to contain the mobility of Tech quarterback Tyrod Taylor. "We need to try to keep him in the pocket and (apply) pressure the same way we have all year," Skov said.

=== Virginia Tech defense ===
Virginia Tech's defense was led by coordinator Bud Foster, who was named a candidate in several teams' searches for a new head coach, but decided to remain at Virginia Tech as the buildup to the Orange Bowl continued. Heading into the game, Tech's defense ranked 38th nationally in total yards allowed, its second-worst performance since 1993. Tech's run defense was 58th, permitting an average 148.9 rushing yards per game. On the positive side of things, Tech's defense had the third-most interceptions (22) in the country, and its scoring defense was 16th (19.1 points per game).

Tech's top performer on defense was sophomore cornerback Jayron Hosley, who had eight interceptions during the season—tied for most in the country—and was named a first-team Walter Camp All-American, a second-team Associated Press All-American, and a second-team Sports Illustrated All-American for that performance. Other top performers included linebackers Bruce Taylor and Stephen Friday, who had 15.5 and 15 tackles for loss, respectively.

The Hokies played the Orange Bowl without starting linebacker Lyndell Gibson, who fractured his shoulder in the second quarter of the ACC Championship Game. Gibson was fourth on the team in tackles with 66. Replacing Gibson was redshirt freshman Tariq Edwards, who played only a few times before the Orange Bowl. The Hokies also returned a player from injury for the Orange Bowl. Linebacker Barquell Rivers, who had been predicted to be Tech's starting middle linebacker, suffered a torn quadriceps tendon in offseason workouts, causing him to miss every game. Heading into the Orange Bowl, coaches were optimistic that he had healed enough to be able to play.

== Game summary ==
The 2011 Orange Bowl kicked off at 8:39 pm EST on January 3, 2011, in Sun Life Stadium, Miami Gardens, Florida. Bowl officials said 65,463 tickets were sold for the game, but many went unused, and that official figure was more than 9,000 below stadium capacity. The game was televised on ESPN, and the announcers were Mike Tirico, Ron Jaworski, Jon Gruden and Michele Tafoya. An estimated 8.23 million viewers watched the broadcast, earning it a Nielsen rating of 7.1. That figure was the second-lowest mark to date for a BCS game. For contributing teams to the Orange Bowl, the Atlantic Coast Conference and Pacific-10 each received large amounts of money to be divided among their members. Because the Pac-10 had two BCS teams, that conference received $27.2 million from the BCS. The ACC, which had only Virginia Tech in a BCS bowl, received $21.2 million. In the ACC, Virginia Tech received a somewhat larger share of the money as a reward for winning the conference: All other ACC teams received $1.1 million; Tech got $1.7 million. Stanford received a similar amount, but the extra money was offset by the cost of sending 500 players, coaches, and staff to Miami.

=== First quarter ===
Stanford returned the game's opening kickoff to its 24-yard line, where the Cardinal offense began the game's first possession. On the game's first play, Stanford quarterback Andrew Luck ran 11 yards through the Virginia Tech defense for a first down. The success was short-lived, however, as Stanford's next three plays did not gain enough ground for another first down, and the team punted from its 37-yard line. Virginia Tech's first possession was no more successful than Stanford's had been. The Hokies' offense entered the game at its 31-yard line after the punt, but went three-and-out after failing to gain a first down.

Tech punted, and Stanford's offense returned to the field. The two teams traded possessions one more time, with Stanford turning the ball over on downs after a failed fourth-down conversion attempt, and Virginia Tech returning the ball with another punt. Following the kick, Stanford's offense began work from its 14-yard line with 8:08 remaining in the quarter. Two plays gained five yards, then Luck completed a 21-yard pass to wide receiver Doug Baldwin for just the second first down of the game. On the next play, Stanford running back Jeremy Stewart broke free of the Virginia Tech defense and ran down the field 60 yards for a touchdown. The score and subsequent extra point gave Stanford a 7–0 lead with 6:16 remaining in the quarter.

Stanford's post-score kickoff was downed for a touchback, and Virginia Tech's offense began from its 20-yard line. The Hokies gained their initial first down of the game when quarterback Tyrod Taylor completed a 19-yard pass to wide receiver Danny Coale on the drive's third play, but Tech was unable to gain another. Tech punted from its 43-yard line, and the kick was downed at the Stanford 5-yard line, where the Cardinal offense started work. Two rushing plays were stopped for no gain, then Luck attempted a passing play on third down. Because the line of scrimmage was so close to the Stanford goal line, Luck had to move into his own end zone to attempt the pass. Under pressure from the Virginia Tech defense, he threw to Derek Hall, who caught the ball in the end zone and was tackled before getting out. The result of the play was a safety, a 2-point defensive score for Virginia Tech.

Trailing 7–2 with 59 seconds remaining in the quarter, Virginia Tech's offense received the ball at its 25-yard line following Stanford's post-safety free kick. On the first play of the subsequent drive, Taylor ran through the Stanford defense for 22 yards and a first down at the Tech 47-yard line. The second play of the drive, a 4-yard run by running back Darren Evans, pushed Tech into Stanford's side of the field for the first time in the game, and was the final play of the quarter. With three quarters remaining, Stanford led Virginia Tech, 7–2.

=== Second quarter ===
The second quarter began with Virginia Tech in possession of the ball and facing second down on Stanford's 49-yard line. On the first play of the quarter, Taylor completed a 10-yard throw to wide receiver Marcus Davis for a first down. Tech's drive continued down the field, with running back Darren Evans receiving the ball on the majority of the plays. A 5-yard false start penalty against Virginia Tech was offset by a pass interference penalty two plays later by Stanford. Tech penetrated to the Stanford 10-yard line, but was stopped for no gain, then a loss, on two consecutive running plays. On third down, Taylor was pressured by the Stanford defense, scrambled out of the pocket, and threw an 11-yard touchdown pass to running back David Wilson an instant before Taylor stepped out of bounds. The score and subsequent extra point gave Tech its only lead of the game, 9–7, with 10:22 remaining before halftime.

Virginia Tech's post-touchdown kickoff was returned to the Stanford 21-yard line, where the Cardinal offense began its first drive of the second quarter. On the first play of the drive, Luck completed a 14-yard pass to tight end Zach Ertz for a first down. Three consecutive short-yardage plays gained another first down, then running back Jeremy Stewart escaped the Virginia Tech defense for a 24-yard gain, pushing the Cardinal into Virginia Tech territory. Three plays later, Luck again threw a long pass to Ertz, this time a 25-yard toss for Stanford's second touchdown of the game. The subsequent extra point kick was blocked by Virginia Tech, but the touchdown's six points were enough for Stanford to regain the lead, 13–9.

Virginia Tech began its first full drive of the second quarter from its 25-yard line, but the Hokies went three-and-out. Stanford's offense, beginning from its 33-yard line after the Tech punt, had its drive cut short when Luck threw an interception to Virginia Tech's Jayron Hosley at the Tech 46-yard line. The Hokies advanced to the Stanford 30-yard line, but turned the ball over on downs after failing to gain one yard on fourth down. Stanford went three-and-out after the Hokies' turnover and punted. Tech's offense returned to the field at its 20-yard line with 49 seconds remaining until halftime. Using a hurry-up offense and strategically calling timeouts to stop the game clock, Tech advanced the ball down the field. Taylor rushed for 14 yards, threw a 32-yard pass, and the Hokies were helped by a 10-yard holding penalty against Stanford. They advanced to the Stanford 20-yard line where, with time running out, they sent in kicker Chris Hazley. He completed a 37-yard field goal in the final play from scrimmage in the first half, making the game a one-point affair, 13–12.

=== Halftime ===
For the game's halftime show, the Orange Bowl hosted American alternative rock band Goo Goo Dolls. Reviews criticized the performance for awkward staging and brevity, as the group performed only two songs. Middle school and high school dance squads also participated in the halftime show, performing on the field while the Goo Goo Dolls played. Pregame media coverage erroneously reported that Stanford's marching band, which had been scheduled to perform, was banned from the field. The band had never been scheduled to perform at halftime; each team's marching band was allotted a six-minute pregame performance.

=== Third quarter ===
Because Stanford received the ball to begin the game, Virginia Tech received it to begin the second half. After starting from their 21-yard line, the Hokies went three-and-out. Following a Tech punt, Stanford's first drive of the second half began at its 41-yard line. Two plays gained 13 yards and a first down, then Stanford began battering Virginia Tech with its passing offense. Luck threw four consecutive passes: the first was incomplete, but the next three went for 10, 17, and 18 yards, respectively. This gave Stanford a first down at the Tech one-yard line. Three plays later, Owen Marecic crossed the goal line on a running play. The subsequent extra point was missed, and Stanford extended its lead to 19–12 with 8:47 remaining.

Virginia Tech's second drive of the half began at its 41-yard line after a 31-yard kickoff return by Wilson. On the first play of the drive, Taylor was sacked for a 13-yard loss. He made good the lost yardage on the next play, however, completing a 42-yard throw to Danny Coale. From the Stanford 40-yard line, Taylor gained five yards on a running play, then attempted a long pass downfield. The throw was intercepted by Stanford's Delano Howell at the Cardinal 3-yard line, returning Luck and the Stanford offense to the field. Luck needed only two plays to drive the length of the field and score a touchdown. A 56-yard run by Stepfan Taylor was followed by a 41-yard touchdown pass to Coby Fleener, and the following extra point kick was good, making the score 26–12 with 5:49 remaining.

Virginia Tech's third drive of the quarter started from its 23-yard line. The first two plays of the drive were stopped for negative gain, then Taylor completed a 17-yard throw to Jarret Boykin for a first down. Tech couldn't gain another first down, however, and punted to Stanford, which started from its 13-yard line. As in Virginia Tech's previous drive, the Stanford offense began with a play that lost yardage, but it made up the failure with a running play that gained six yards and a passing play from Luck to Fleener for a first down at the Stanford 32-yard line. On the quarter's final play, running back Tyler Gaffney gained seven yards. With one quarter remaining, Stanford led 26–12.

=== Fourth quarter ===
The fourth quarter began with Stanford in possession of the ball and facing second down and three from its 39-yard line. Two plays gained the Cardinal a first down, then Stanford committed a false-start penalty that pushed its offense back five yards. Two plays later, however, Luck completed a 58-yard pass to Fleener, who made up the lost yardage and far more as he raced down the field for a touchdown. The following extra point granted Stanford a 33–12 lead with 12:28 remaining.

Following Stanford's post-touchdown kickoff, Virginia Tech's offense took the field at its 25-yard line and embarked upon one of its longest drives of the game in terms of the number of plays. In the first seven plays of the drive, quarterback Taylor was the key component. He threw six passes, completing 3 for 39 yards, and ran once, for no gain. On the eighth play of the drive, running back Ryan Williams gained one yard, then committed a 15-yard personal foul penalty. Tech's drive faltered after the penalty: Taylor threw an incomplete pass, then was sacked for a 16-yard loss, and the Hokies punted to the Stanford 28-yard line.

As it had in the third quarter, Stanford's offense scored quickly. In only three plays, the Cardinal advanced 72 yards. A 34-yard run by Stepfan Taylor was followed by one stopped for no gain, then Luck completed a 38-yard throw to Fleener for Stanford's second touchdown of the quarter. The score and extra point improved Stanford's lead to 40–12 with 6:05 remaining in the game. Tech's subsequent drive went three-and-out after Tyrod Taylor was sacked twice, and Stanford got the ball again at its 46-yard line.

With only 4:25 remaining and a lead well in hand, Stanford began running down the clock by executing running plays, which keep the game clock running as long as the ball carrier is downed in the field of play. Three rushes gained Stanford 16 yards, but the effectiveness of this strategy was undermined by a 15-yard personal foul penalty against Stanford that prevented the Cardinal from gaining a first down. Stanford also accepted a delay of game penalty in order to squeeze as much time as possible from the clock before punting back to Virginia Tech. The final drive of the game began from the Tech 11-yard line with 2:10 remaining, and quarterback Taylor controlled the ball on all of its five plays. Taylor completed a five-yard pass to Coale, then ran for 18 yards and a first down. He was then sacked for a 15-yard loss, but gained much of that back with an 11-yard run. On the game's final play, Taylor completed a 17-yard first-down pass to Wilson, who was tackled as the last second ticked off the clock and Stanford clinched a 40–12 victory.

=== Scoring summary ===
Scoring summary

Quarter	Time	Drive			Team	Scoring information	Score	
Quarter	Time	Plays	Yards	TOP	Team	Scoring information	STAN	VT
1	6:16	4	86	1:52	STAN	Jeremy Stewart 60-yard touchdown run, Nate Whitaker kick good	7	0
1	0:59	3	3	1:40	STAN	Derek Hall tackled in end zone for a safety by the Virginia Tech defense	7	2
2	10:22	10	75	5:37	VT	David Wilson 11-yard touchdown reception from Tyrod Taylor, Chris Hazley kick good	7	9
2	6:32	8	79	3:50	STAN	Zach Ertz 25-yard touchdown reception from Andrew Luck, Nate Whitaker kick blocked	13	9
2	0:03	6	60	0:44	VT	37-yard field goal by Chris Hazley	13	12
3	8:47	9	59	4:26	STAN	Owen Marecic 1-yard touchdown run, Nate Whitaker kick no good	19	12
3	5:49	2	97	0:29	STAN	Coby Fleener 41-yard touchdown reception from Andrew Luck, Nate Whitaker kick good	26	12
4	12:28	8	87	5:06	STAN	Coby Fleener 58-yard touchdown reception from Andrew Luck, Nate Whitaker kick good	33	12
4	6:05	3	72	1:34	STAN	Coby Fleener 38-yard touchdown reception from Andrew Luck, Nate Whitaker kick good	40	12
"TOP" = time of possession. For other American football terms, see Glossary of American football.							40	12

== Statistical summary ==
Statistical comparison
	STAN	VT
1st downs	19	16
Total yards	534	291
Passing yards	287	224
Rushing yards	247	67
Penalties	6–49	4–28
3rd down conversions	6–11	5–14
4th down conversions	0–1	0–1
Turnovers	2	1
Time of Possession	27:46	32:14

For his game-winning performance, Stanford quarterback Andrew Luck was named the game's Most Valuable Player. He completed 18 of his 23 pass attempts for 287 yards and 4 touchdowns. The four touchdowns was a Stanford bowl-game record, and three of Luck's touchdowns went to tight end Coby Fleener, who set a Stanford and Orange Bowl record with 173 receiving yards and tied a record with the three touchdown catches. In postgame analysis, Fleener's performance was touted as the factor "that turned a close game into a rout".

Despite those players' performances, the game was decided in the running game and the performance of the two teams' offensive and defensive lines. Stanford coach Jim Harbaugh was praised for adjusting his team's strategy at halftime, allowing it to succeed in the second half. Stanford's rushing offense accounted for 247 yards, while its defensive line limited Virginia Tech to just 67 yards rushing. The Stanford defense also sacked Virginia Tech quarterback Tyrod Taylor eight times, denying him time to pass the ball accurately.

Stanford's leading rusher was Stepfan Taylor, who accumulated 114 yards on 13 carries, including a 56-yard sprint that was the second-longest run of his career. Stanford's No. 2 runner, Jeremy Stewart, had a career-high 99 rushing yards. His 60-yard touchdown run in the first quarter is the longest touchdown run in Stanford bowl-game history and the seventh-longest in Orange Bowl history. Virginia Tech's leading rusher was Darren Evans, who had 12 carries for 37 yards. Virginia Tech quarterback Tyrod Taylor was the team's No. 2 rusher, with 16 carries for 22 yards. He also completed 16 of 31 pass attempts for 222 yards and Tech's sole touchdown.

On defense, Virginia Tech's Jayron Hosley tied the school record for interceptions (9) and had the most in the nation that season when he caught an Andrew Luck pass in the first half. Tech's defense also recorded its first safety since 2008, and its blocked extra point was the first such block in Virginia Tech bowl-game history. The Hokies' leading tackler was Eddie Whitley, who had seven stops, while Stanford's leading defensive performer was Shayne Skov, who had 12 tackles, including 3 quarterback sacks.

== Postgame effects ==
With the victory, Stanford improved to 12–1, while the loss sent Virginia Tech to 11–3. Stanford's 12 wins extended a school record for one season, and its eight-game winning streak tied for the third-longest in school history. Stanford's win was its first bowl game victory since the 1996 Sun Bowl against Michigan State, and San Francisco Chronicle football writer Tom FitzGerald declared one of the 10 all-time best Bay Area college football teams. In the final college football polls of the season, Stanford rose to No. 4, while Virginia Tech dropped to 16th in the Associated Press Poll and 15th in the USA Today coaches' poll.

Stanford's victory in the Orange Bowl caused a massive jump in the number of season ticket sales at the school. By mid-February 2011, the school reported having sold 1,400 new season tickets, as compared to just 458 in the first six months of 2010.

Following the game, some actions by Orange Bowl Committee officials came under fire as the Miami Herald revealed the nonprofit committee had spent millions of dollars on junket trips for college football administrators. The U.S. federal Internal Revenue Service subsequently began investigating the allegations. In its annual transition to new leadership, the Orange Bowl committee picked Goldman Sachs vice president Jeffrey T. Roberts to serve as its president for the 2012 game.

=== Coaching changes ===
Both teams underwent changes in leadership following the Orange Bowl. Four days after beating Virginia Tech, Stanford head coach Jim Harbaugh signed a contract as the new head coach of the National Football League's San Francisco 49ers. He was replaced as Stanford head coach by David Shaw, the team's offensive coordinator. Defensive coordinator Vic Fangio followed Harbaugh to the 49ers and was replaced by co-defensive coordinators Jason Tarver and Derek Mason, the latter also serving as associate head coach. To replace the vacated offensive coordinator position, Shaw selected Stanford wide receivers coach Pep Hamilton.

Virginia Tech's coaching changes came about a month after the Orange Bowl. On February 14, the school announced that the son of head coach Frank Beamer, Shane Beamer, had been hired as running backs coach. He replaced Billy Hite, the longest-tenured assistant coach in the country, who took an administrative role with the team. Two days later, Tech replaced 62-year-old linebackers coach Jim Cavanaugh with 35-year-old Cornell Brown. On February 22, Tech announced that offensive coordinator Bryan Stinespring had been removed from play-calling duties and replaced by quarterbacks coach Mike O'Cain. Stinespring, who also was the team's associate head coach, was replaced in that capacity by Shane Beamer.

=== 2011 NFL draft ===
For several players on each team, the Orange Bowl was their final collegiate contest before attempting to move into professional football. Two days after the Orange Bowl, Virginia Tech running back Darren Evans announced his intention to enter the NFL Draft. Three days later, fellow running back Ryan Williams made a similar move. Stanford quarterback Andrew Luck made news for not entering the draft, where he had been widely predicted to be the No. 1 selection. In interviews, he said he looked forward "to earning [his] degree in architectural design from Stanford University" and graduating in spring 2012.

The 2011 NFL Draft took place in late April, and several players from each Orange Bowl team were selected by professional squads seeking their talents. Virginia Tech's Ryan Williams was the first Orange Bowl participant selected, taken with the 38th overall pick. Tech's Rashad Carmichael (127th), and Tyrod Taylor (180th) were also selected. Stanford had four players picked in the draft: Sione Fua (97th), Owen Marecic (124th), Richard Sherman (154th), and Ryan Whalen (157th).

== See also ==
- Glossary of American football
