= 2010 Clemson Tigers football team =

American college football season

2010 Clemson Tigers football

Meineke Car Care Bowl, L 26–31 vs. South Florida
- Conference: Atlantic Coast Conference
- Atlantic Division
- Record: 6–7 (4–4 ACC)
- Head coach: Dabo Swinney (2nd full, 3rd overall season)
- Offensive coordinator: Billy Napier (2nd season)
- Defensive coordinator: Kevin Steele (2nd season)
- Base defense: 4–3
- Home stadium: Memorial Stadium

2010 Atlantic Coast Conference football standings
	Conf.			Overall
Team	W		L	W		L
Atlantic Division
No. 17 Florida State x	6	–	2	10	–	4
No. 23 Maryland	5	–	3	9	–	4
No. 25 NC State	5	–	3	9	–	4
Boston College	4	–	4	7	–	6
Clemson	4	–	4	6	–	7
Wake Forest	1	–	7	3	–	9
Coastal Division
No. 16 Virginia Tech x$	8	–	0	11	–	3
Miami (FL)	5	–	3	7	–	6
Georgia Tech	4	–	4	6	–	7
North Carolina	4	–	4	8	–	5
Duke	1	–	7	3	–	9
Virginia	1	–	7	4	–	8
Championship: Virginia Tech 44, Florida State 33
$ – BCS representative as conference champion; x – Division champion/co-champions; Rankings from AP Poll

The 2010 Clemson Tigers football team represented Clemson University in the 2010 NCAA Division I FBS football season. The Tigers were led by head coach Dabo Swinney in his second full year and third year overall after taking over the job midway through the 2008 season. They played their home games at Memorial Stadium and were members of the Atlantic Coast Conference in the Atlantic Division. They finished the season 6–7, 4–4 in ACC play and were invited to the Meineke Car Care Bowl where they were defeated by South Florida, 31–26. As of 2024, this is the only losing season for the Tigers under coach Dabo Swinney's tenure.

== Before the season ==
=== Departures ===
- Jamie Cumbie (DT, RS Junior) – Dismissed for violation of team rules (assault charges)
- J.K. Jay (OL, Freshman) – Back injuries; will remain at Clemson as a student coach
- Willy Korn (QB, RS Sophomore) – Graduated; transferred to Marshall University then to North Greenville University

=== Recruiting class ===
College recruiting (2010)
Name	Hometown	School	Height	Weight	Commit date
Martavis Bryant; WR	Anderson, South Carolina	T. L. Hanna	6 ft 4 in (1.93 m)	195 lb (88 kg)	-
Martavis Bryant; WR	Recruit ratings: Scout: Rivals: 247Sports: ESPN:				
DeAndre Hopkins; WR	Central, South Carolina	D. W. Daniel	6 ft 1 in (1.85 m)	195 lb (88 kg)	—
DeAndre Hopkins; WR	Recruit ratings: Scout: Rivals: 247Sports: ESPN:				
Josh Watson; DT	Chatham, Virginia	Hargrave Military Academy	6 ft 4 in (1.93 m)	270 lb (120 kg)	—
Josh Watson; DT	Recruit ratings: Scout: Rivals: 247Sports: ESPN:				
Garry Peters; CB	Conyers, Georgia	Heritage	6 ft 0 in (1.83 m)	185 lb (84 kg)	
Garry Peters; CB	Recruit ratings: Scout: Rivals: 247Sports: ESPN:				
Darius Robinson; CB	Atlanta, Georgia	Westlake	5 ft 10 in (1.78 m)	165 lb (75 kg)	—
Darius Robinson; CB	Recruit ratings: Scout: Rivals: 247Sports: ESPN:				
Justin Parker; LB	Ladys Island, South Carolina	Beaufort H.S.	6 ft 1 in (1.85 m)	225 lb (102 kg)	—
Justin Parker; LB	Recruit ratings: Scout: Rivals: 247Sports: ESPN:				
Bashaud Breeland; S	Fairfax, South Carolina	Allendale Fairfax H.S.	6 ft 1 in (1.85 m)	190 lb (86 kg)	-
Bashaud Breeland; S	Recruit ratings: Scout: Rivals: 247Sports: ESPN:				
David Beasley; OG	Columbus, Georgia	Carver H.S.	6 ft 4 in (1.93 m)	290 lb (130 kg)	—
David Beasley; OG	Recruit ratings: Scout: Rivals: 247Sports: ESPN:				
Tavaris Barnes; DE	Jacksonville, Florida	First Coast H.S.	6 ft 5 in (1.96 m)	250 lb (110 kg)	—
Tavaris Barnes; DE	Recruit ratings: Scout: Rivals: 247Sports: ESPN:				
Vic Beasley; TE	Adairsville, Georgia	Adairsville H.S.	6 ft 4 in (1.93 m)	225 lb (102 kg)	—
Vic Beasley; TE	Recruit ratings: Scout: Rivals: 247Sports: ESPN:				
Desmond Brown; S	Centre, Alabama	Cherokee Co Sch	6 ft 0 in (1.83 m)	192 lb (87 kg)	—
Desmond Brown; S	Recruit ratings: Scout: Rivals: 247Sports: ESPN:				
Reid Webster; OL	Woodstock, Georgia	Etowa H.S.	6 ft 4 in (1.93 m)	290 lb (130 kg)	—
Reid Webster; OL	Recruit ratings: Scout: Rivals: 247Sports: ESPN:				
Joe Craig; ATH	Gaffney, South Carolina	Gaffney H.S.	6 ft 0 in (1.83 m)	170 lb (77 kg)	—
Joe Craig; ATH	Recruit ratings: Scout: Rivals: 247Sports: ESPN:				
DJ Howard; RB	Lincoln, Alabama	Lincoln H.S.	5 ft 11 in (1.80 m)	190 lb (86 kg)	—
DJ Howard; RB	Recruit ratings: Scout: Rivals: 247Sports: ESPN:				
Demont Buice; RB	Gadsden, Alabama	Gadsden H.S.	6 ft 2 in (1.88 m)	205 lb (93 kg)	—
Demont Buice; RB	Recruit ratings: Scout: Rivals: 247Sports: ESPN:				
Jake Nicolopulos; LB	Anderson, South Carolina	T. L. Hanna	6 ft 2 in (1.88 m)	220 lb (100 kg)	—
Jake Nicolopulos; LB	Recruit ratings: Scout: Rivals: 247Sports: ESPN:				
Ricky Chaney; S	Beaufort, South Carolina	Battery Creek	6 ft 2 in (1.88 m)	195 lb (88 kg)	—
Ricky Chaney; S	Recruit ratings: Scout: Rivals: 247Sports: ESPN:				
Martin Jenkins; DB	Roswell, Georgia	Rosswell H.S.	5 ft 10 in (1.78 m)	170 lb (77 kg)	—
Martin Jenkins; DB	Recruit ratings: Scout: Rivals: 247Sports: ESPN:				
Tra Thomas; DT	Wadesboro, North Carolina	Anson H.S.	6 ft 0 in (1.83 m)	285 lb (129 kg)	—
Tra Thomas; DT	Recruit ratings: Scout: Rivals: 247Sports: ESPN:				
Kalon Davis; OG	Chester, South Carolina	Chester H.S.	6 ft 4 in (1.93 m)	345 lb (156 kg)	—
Kalon Davis; OG	Recruit ratings: Scout: Rivals: 247Sports: ESPN:				
Overall recruit ranking: Scout: 14 Rivals: 20 247Sports: 28 ESPN: 19
‡ Refers to 40-yard dash; Note: In many cases, Scout, Rivals, 247Sports, On3, and ESPN may conflict in their listings of height, weight and 40 time.; In these cases, the average was taken. ESPN grades are on a 100-point scale.; Sources: "2010 Team Ranking". Rivals.com.

== Schedule ==
Date	Time	Opponent	Site	TV	Result	Attendance
September 4	3:30 p.m.	North Texas*	Memorial Stadium; Clemson, SC (Hall of Fame Day)	ESPNU	W 35–10	77,342
September 11	3:30 p.m.	Presbyterian*	Memorial Stadium; Clemson, SC (Family/Youth Day)	ESPN3	W 58–21	74,358
September 18	7:00 p.m.	at No. 16 Auburn*	Jordan–Hare Stadium; Auburn, AL (rivalry, College GameDay)	ESPN	L 24–27 ^{OT}	87,451
October 2	12:00 p.m.	No. 16 Miami (FL)^{†}	Memorial Stadium; Clemson, SC	ESPN2	L 21–30	82,313
October 9	3:30 p.m.	at North Carolina	Kenan Memorial Stadium; Chapel Hill, NC	ABC/ESPN	L 16–21	60,000
October 16	12:00 p.m.	Maryland	Memorial Stadium; Clemson, SC (Football Reunion Day)	ACCN	W 31–7	72,484
October 23	3:30 p.m.	Georgia Tech	Memorial Stadium; Clemson, SC (rivalry, IPTAY Day)	ABC/ESPN	W 27–13	78,522
October 30	12:00 p.m.	at Boston College	Alumni Stadium; Chestnut Hill, MA (O'Rourke–McFadden Trophy)	ACCN	L 10–16	37,137
November 6	12:00 p.m.	No. 25 NC State	Memorial Stadium; Clemson, SC (Textile Bowl, Military Appreciation Day)	ACCN	W 14–13	75,906
November 13	8:00 p.m.	at Florida State	Doak Campbell Stadium; Tallahassee, FL (rivalry)	ABC	L 13–16	72,228
November 20	2:00 p.m.	at Wake Forest	BB&T Field; Winston-Salem, NC	ESPN3	W 30–10	31,783
November 27	7:00 p.m.	No. 17 South Carolina*	Memorial Stadium; Clemson, SC (rivalry)	ESPN2	L 7–29	81,355
December 31	12:00 p.m.	vs. South Florida*	Bank of America Stadium; Charlotte, NC (Meineke Car Care Bowl)	ESPN	L 26–31	41,122
*Non-conference game; ^{†}Homecoming; Rankings from AP Poll released prior to the game; All times are in Eastern time

== Game summaries ==
=== vs No. 18 South Carolina (rivalry) ===
Game Twelve– No. 18 South Carolina Gamecocks (8-3) at Clemson Tigers (6-5) – Game summary

Quarter	1	2	3	4	Total
No. 18 South Carolina	9	10	10	0	29
Clemson	7	0	0	0	7

at Memorial Stadium • Clemson, South Carolina

- Date: Saturday, November 27, 2010
- Game time: 7:00 p.m. EST
- Game weather: Temperature: • Wind: • Weather: Clear
- TV announcers (ESPN2): Carter Blackburn, Brock Huard, Mike Bellotti

Game information

First quarter

- (13:10) CLEM – DeAndre Hopkins 45-yard pass from Kyle Parker (Chandler Catanzaro kick) (Drive: 4 plays, 74 yards, 1:50; Clemson 7-0)
- (9:18) SC – Spencer Lanning 46-yard field goal (Drive: 11 plays, 48 yards, 3:52; Clemson 7-3)
- (5:00) SC – Patrick DiMarco 5-yard pass from Stephen Garcia (Spencer Lanning kick BLOCKED) (Drive: 1 play, 5 yards, 0:05; South Carolina 9-7)

Second quarter

- (14:53) SC – Alshon Jeffery 37-yard pass from Stephen Garcia (Spencer Lanning kick) (Drive: 5 plays, 85 yards, 2:16; South Carolina 16-7)
- (8:22) SC – Spencer Lanning 25-yard field goal (Drive: 10 plays, 72 yards, 5:29; South Carolina 19-7)

Third quarter

- (10:17) SC – Antonio Allen 37-yard interception return (Spencer Lanning kick) (South Carolina 26-7)
- (1:15) SC – Spencer Lanning 37-yard field goal (Drive: 6 plays, 20 yards, 2:49; South Carolina 29-7)

Fourth quarter

- no scoring

Statistics	SC	CLEM
First downs	14	13
Total yards	66–322	62–251
Rushing yards	36–95	27–61
Passing yards	227	212
Passing: Comp–Att–Int	14–30–0	17–35–1
Time of possession	21:11	15:26

Team	Category	Player	Statistics
South Carolina	Passing	Stephen Garcia	14/30, 227 yards, 2 TD
South Carolina	Rushing	Marcus Lattimore	23 carries, 48 yards
South Carolina	Receiving	Alshon Jeffery	5 receptions, 141 yards, TD
Clemson	Passing	Kyle Parker	7/17, 117 yards, TD, INT
Clemson	Rushing	Jamie Harper	16 carries, 58 yards
Clemson	Receiving	DeAndre Hopkins	7 receptions, 124 yards, TD

== Draft picks ==
The Tigers had six players selected in the 2011 NFL draft.

Player	Team	Round	Pick #	Position
Jarvis Jenkins	Washington Redskins	2nd	41	DE
Marcus Gilchrist	San Diego Chargers	2nd	50th	CB
Da'Quan Bowers	Tampa Bay Buccaneers	2nd	51	DE
Chris Hairston	Buffalo Bills	4th	122	OT
Jamie Harper	Tennessee Titans	4th	130th	RB
Byron Maxwell	Seattle Seahawks	6th	173rd	CB
