= 2010 ACC Championship Game =

2010 Dr. Pepper ACC Championship Game
- Conference Championship
Florida State Seminoles	Virginia Tech Hokies
(9–3)	(10–2)
33	44
Head coach: Jimbo Fisher	Head coach: Frank Beamer
AP / Coaches / BCS; 20 / 20 / 21	AP / Coaches / BCS; 12 / 11 / 15
	1	2	3	4	Total
Florida State	10	7	7	9	33
Virginia Tech	14	7	14	9	44
- Date: December 4, 2010
- Season: 2010
- Stadium: Bank of America Stadium
- Location: Charlotte, North Carolina
- MVP: QB Tyrod Taylor (Virginia Tech)
- Favorite: Virginia Tech by 4.5
- National anthem: Nicole Henry, R&B singer
- Referee: Brad Allen
- Attendance: 72,379

United States TV coverage
- Network: ESPN
- Announcers: Sean McDonough play-by-play Matt Millen color Heather Cox sideline
- Nielsen ratings: 1.8

2010 Atlantic Coast Conference football standings
	Conf.			Overall
Team	W		L	W		L
Atlantic Division
No. 17 Florida State x	6	–	2	10	–	4
No. 23 Maryland	5	–	3	9	–	4
No. 25 NC State	5	–	3	9	–	4
Boston College	4	–	4	7	–	6
Clemson	4	–	4	6	–	7
Wake Forest	1	–	7	3	–	9
Coastal Division
No. 16 Virginia Tech x$	8	–	0	11	–	3
Miami (FL)	5	–	3	7	–	6
Georgia Tech	4	–	4	6	–	7
North Carolina	4	–	4	8	–	5
Duke	1	–	7	3	–	9
Virginia	1	–	7	4	–	8
Championship: Virginia Tech 44, Florida State 33
$ – BCS representative as conference champion; x – Division champion/co-champions; Rankings from AP Poll

The 2010 ACC Championship Game was a college football game between the Virginia Tech Hokies and the Florida State Seminoles. The game, sponsored by Dr. Pepper, was the final regular-season contest of the 2010 college football season for the Atlantic Coast Conference. Virginia Tech defeated Florida State, winning the Atlantic Coast Conference football championship, 44–33. Until 2021, this was the last ACC championship game won by the Coastal Division.

The Virginia Tech Hokies were selected to represent the Coastal Division by virtue of an undefeated (8–0) record in conference play and a 10–2 record overall. Representing the Atlantic Division was Florida State, which had a 9–3 record (6–2 ACC). The game was a rematch of the inaugural ACC Championship Game, won 27–22 by Florida State in 2005.

The game was held at Bank of America Stadium in Charlotte, North Carolina on December 4, 2010. Charlotte was chosen after poor attendance at the game's previous locations (Tampa, Florida and Jacksonville, Florida) led conference officials to seek a location closer to the conference's geographic center. The 2010 championship was the first to be played in Charlotte, and the game will return to the city in 2011.

The 2010 game began slowly, as Florida State scored only a field goal on its opening possession and Virginia Tech was held scoreless on its first try. On the second play of Florida State's second possession, Virginia Tech defender Jeron Gouveia-Winslow intercepted a pass by Florida state quarterback E. J. Manuel and returned it for a touchdown, giving the Hokies a 7–3 lead. They did not relinquish the advantage the rest of the game. The teams traded field goals and touchdowns through the remainder of the first and second quarters and entered halftime with Tech leading 21–17. In the third quarter, Tech scored 14 points to Florida State's seven, establishing the winning margin. In the final quarter, each team scored nine points, and the Hokies won with the most points ever scored by one team in an ACC championship game. In recognition of his winning performance, Virginia Tech quarterback Tyrod Taylor was named the game's most valuable player.

By winning, Virginia Tech earned a spot in the 2011 Orange Bowl football game, and Florida State was selected for the 2010 Chick-fil-A Bowl. Several players that participated in the 2010 ACC Championship Game were picked in the 2011 NFL draft.

== Selection process ==
The ACC Championship Game matches the winners of the Coastal and Atlantic divisions of the Atlantic Coast Conference. In the early 2000s, the league underwent an expansion to add three former Big East members: Miami and Virginia Tech in 2004, and Boston College in 2005. With the addition of a twelfth team, the ACC was allowed to hold a conference championship game under National Collegiate Athletic Association (NCAA) rules.

The inaugural 2005 game featured a Florida State win over Virginia Tech, 27–22. In 2006, two different teams made their first appearances in the game, which was held in Jacksonville, Florida. Wake Forest defeated Georgia Tech, 9–6. 2007 featured one championship-game veteran and one team new to the championship as Virginia Tech faced off against Boston College. The game resulted in a 30–16 Virginia Tech victory. The 2008 game saw a rematch of the previous year, as Virginia Tech again defeated Boston College, 30–12. In 2009, Georgia Tech defeated newcomer Clemson, 39–34.

=== Site selection ===
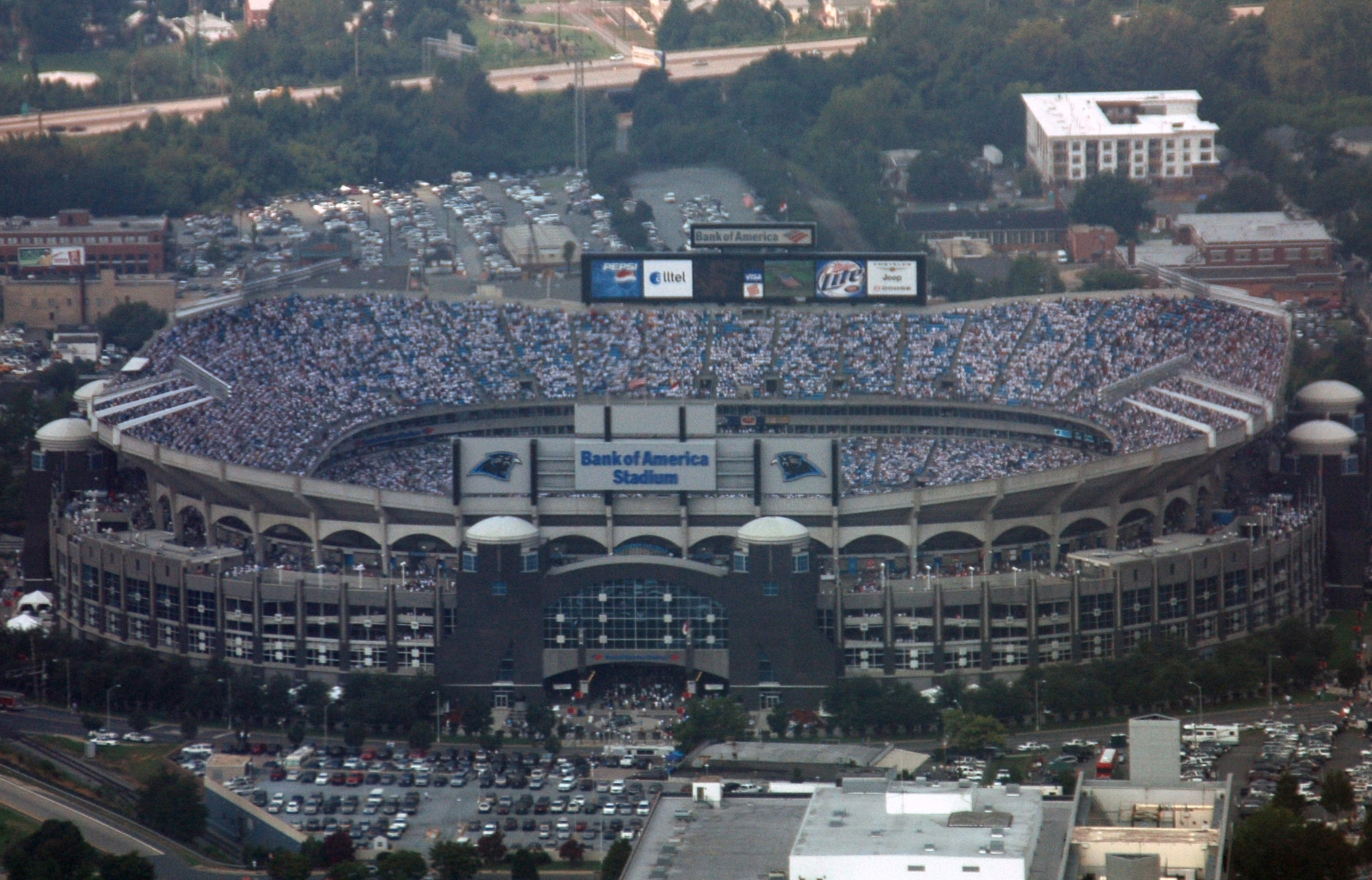
Bank of America Stadium, site of the 2010 ACC Championship Game

Before the 2007 game, cities other than Jacksonville (site of the 2007 ACC Championship Game) presented their plans to be the site of the 2008 ACC Championship Game. After poor attendance in the ACC Championship Game at Jacksonville for the second straight year, ACC officials and representatives of the conference's member schools elected not to extend the Gator Bowl Association's contract to manage and host the game for another year. On December 12, less than two weeks after Jacksonville had hosted the 2007 ACC Championship Game, the ACC announced that Tampa, Florida would host the game in 2008 and 2009 and Charlotte, North Carolina would host the game in 2010 and 2011.

The cities were chosen based on bids presented to the ACC and its member schools. Each city requested and was granted a two-year contract. Tampa was chosen as the site of the 2008 game because Charlotte was scheduled to hold the annual convention of the Association for Career and Technical Education at the same time as the game, and adequate hotel space would not be ready in time for the two events. Because of this, Charlotte's two-year span of hosting the game was pushed back to 2010.

=== Team selection ===
Before the beginning of the 2010 college football season, the annual poll by media members who cover ACC football predicted Florida State would win the Atlantic Division and Virginia Tech would win the Coastal Division. Florida State received 78 of a possible 98 first-place votes in its division, while Virginia Tech received 62. In a vote to predict the ACC champion, Virginia Tech received 50 votes from 98 possible. Florida State received 26 votes, and all other teams received a combined 20.

Immediately after the preseason poll, however, speculation began as to whether regular-season parity would render the prediction irrelevant. Before the 2010 season, the poll had predicted the ACC winner correctly only once in the championship game era. In the Coastal Division, this speculation was groundless, as Virginia Tech's undefeated season rendered any other winner impossible. In the Atlantic Division, the situation was much different. As late as the second week of November, four of the six division teams were in contention for the division title. These candidates were whittled to three with two weeks remaining in the regular season, then to two in the final week. During that week, NC State traveled to Maryland. If NC State had won, it would have been the Atlantic Division winner by virtue of a tie-breaking win against Florida State. Instead, NC State lost 38–31, and Florida State earned a bid to the championship game.

==== Virginia Tech ====
The Virginia Tech Hokies entered the 2010 season after a 2009 campaign that saw the team finish 10–3, including a season-ending win in the 2009 Chick-fil-A Bowl against the Tennessee Volunteers. Because of that season-ending victory and the Hokies' general good performance during the 2009 season, Virginia Tech was ranked No. 10 in preseason national polling. The Hokies' first game of the season was a nationally televised contest against then-No. 3 Boise State at FedExField near Washington, D.C. Because the game was the first of the season to feature two top-10 teams, it received large amounts of media coverage. During the game, Virginia Tech fell behind 17–0 in the first quarter, but rallied to take a 21–20 lead early in the third quarter. The two teams traded the lead, alternating scoring drives until Boise State scored a touchdown with 1:06 remaining. Virginia Tech was unable to reply one final time, and Boise State earned a 33–30 victory.

The close loss discouraged the Virginia Tech players, who then had only five days to prepare for their next opponent, lightly regarded James Madison University. At Lane Stadium, Virginia Tech's home field, James Madison upset the heavily favored Hokies, 21–16. The loss was only the second time in college football history that a team ranked nationally was defeated by a team from the NCAA Football Championship Subdivision. In the wake of the loss, Virginia Tech fell from No. 13 to out of the polls entirely.

Following the loss, seniors on the football team held a players-only meeting in an effort to rally the team. Players later recalled that meeting as the turning point in the team's season. The next week, Virginia Tech earned its first win of the season, a 49–27 victory over East Carolina in Lane Stadium. The Hokies followed that by traveling to Boston College for a 19–0 win, their first shutout since 2006.

The two victories were the start of a winning streak that saw the Hokies complete the regular season without another loss. Following Boston College, they defeated No. 23 NC State in its home stadium, 41–30. They defeated nonconference opponent Central Michigan, then beat conference opponent Wake Forest and re-entered the polls at No. 25. Their position in the polls climbed with each opponent they defeated. They beat Duke as the No. 25 team, Georgia Tech as the No. 23 team, North Carolina as the No. 20 team and No. 23 Miami as the No. 16 team. The Miami victory clinched Tech the division championship and a slot in the ACC championship game, but the Hokies still won their final previously scheduled game, the annual Commonwealth Cup rivalry against Virginia.

==== Florida State ====
Florida State began 2010 after a 7–6 record in 2009 that ended with a 33–21 win against West Virginia in the 2010 Gator Bowl. Florida State also began the year under a new head coach. Bobby Bowden, who retired after 57 years as a head coach, 34 at Florida State and 33 consecutive winning seasons, was replaced by Jimbo Fisher. Immediately before the 2010 season began, Bowden claimed he had been pushed out as head coach, causing a stir before Florida State's first game.

For its opening game, Florida State faced the lightly regarded Samford Bulldogs and defeated them 59–6. In its second game, No. 17 Florida State faced a tougher challenge as it traveled to Norman, Oklahoma to play the No. 10-ranked Oklahoma Sooners. The Seminoles were defeated 47–17, in their third-worst loss since 1991. Florida State rebounded from the loss to defeat Brigham Young University, 34–10, then opened the ACC season by defeating Wake Forest, Virginia, in-state rival Miami and Boston College in succession.

On October 28, Florida State traveled to Raleigh, North Carolina to play NC State. Despite leading 21–7 at halftime, Florida State allowed NC State to rally and win the game, 28–24. NC State's win gave it a one-game lead and a tiebreaker against the Seminoles in the Atlantic Division . The following week, Florida State again lost, this time to North Carolina, a Coastal Division opponent. The same week, NC State lost to Clemson, bringing Florida State even with NC State in the divisional standings. NC State still held the tiebreaker, however.

With three weeks remaining in the regular season and two other Atlantic Division teams also with one loss, there were 120 possible scenarios for the four tied teams. On Nov 13, Florida State defeated Clemson 16–13, eliminating one of the four tied teams from contention for the divisional championship. The following week, Florida State defeated Maryland, 30–16, eliminating another contender. The divisional championship came down to the final week. Because Florida State was playing nonconference rival Florida, the division was decided by the matchup between NC State and Maryland. Hours after Florida State defeated Florida 31–7, NC State lost to Maryland, giving Florida State the Atlantic Division championship and a bid to the ACC Championship Game.

== Pregame buildup ==
Following the last week of regularly scheduled conference games, both teams moved up in the national college football polls. Florida State, which had been ranked No. 22 in the BCS Poll, No. 22 in the AP Poll, and No. 21 in the Coaches' Poll, rose to No. 21 in the BCS, No. 20 in the AP Poll, and No. 20 in the Coaches' Poll. Virginia Tech, which had been ranked 16th in the BCS, 13th in the AP Poll and 14th in the Coaches' Poll before the final week of the regular season, climbed to 15th in the BCS, 11th in the AP Poll and 11th in the Coaches' Poll. Spread bettors predicted Virginia Tech would win the game. Various betting organizations favored the Hokies by four or 4.5 points. The matchup was a repeat of the inaugural ACC Championship game, and according to observers, the Seminoles' presence appeared to mark a resurgence for Florida State, which performed below expectations in the final years of Bowden's tenure. For Virginia Tech, there were hopes of breaking a trend of losing to Florida State. Virginia Tech head coach Frank Beamer was 1–8 against Florida State, and the Hokies overall were 11–22–1 against the Seminoles.

=== Attendance concerns ===
After two years of poor attendance at ACC championship games in Tampa, Florida, organizers hoped moving the game to Charlotte, closer to the geographic center of the conference, would result in improved ticket sales. That hypothesis was borne out as early public sales approached 28,000 tickets before the participating teams were officially announced. After the announcement, each school sold its allotment of 10,000 tickets, and the more than 50,000 publicly available tickets were purchased at a rapid pace. ACC officials and Charlotte boosters each said they were satisfied with the pace and quantity of ticket sales.

=== Florida State offense ===
During the 2010 season, Florida State senior quarterback Christian Ponder completed 62.2 percent of his passes for a total of 2,038 yards, and Florida State head coach Jimbo Fisher called him "one of the great Florida State quarterbacks of all time." Despite this endorsement, Ponder's participation in the ACC Championship was in doubt because of injured elbow fascia sustained in the Seminoles' game against Boston College. The issue remained in doubt until the day of the ACC Championship, when coach Fisher announced that sophomore quarterback E. J. Manuel, who had led the Seminoles against Clemson was given the start.

Protecting both quarterbacks was a strong offensive line anchored by All-American guard Rodney Hudson, a two-time winner of the Jacobs Blocking Trophy, a four-time recipient of all-conference honors and a finalist for the Outland Trophy. Hudson and the offensive line also protected Florida State's running backs. Foremost among these was sophomore Chris Thompson, who led the team with 687 rushing yards. Thompson was predicted to start the ACC Championship game because of his performance in the regular season and because fellow running backs Ty Jones and Jermaine Thomas were injured. Taken together, Florida State's offense was 52nd in total offense, accumulating 391 yards per game.

=== Virginia Tech offense ===
Virginia Tech's offense was centered on quarterback Tyrod Taylor, who was named ACC Player of the Year on December 1. Taylor threw 20 touchdown passes, had only four interceptions and completed 60.2 percent of his passes. He also rushed for 613 yards, a figure that included several "game-changing" runs. Alongside Taylor, the Hokies boasted three strong running backs: David Wilson, Ryan Williams and Darren Evans. Wilson had 573 rushing yards, 509 return yards, 165 receiving yards and nine touchdowns despite being an underclassman. The Hokies led the ACC in scoring, averaging 34.8 points per game, and were 38th in the nation in total offense (409 yards per game).

=== Florida State defense ===
Virginia Tech's offensive line was particularly concerned with containing Florida State sophomore defensive end Brandon Jenkins, who was tied for third in the nation in sacks (12) and 15th in tackles for loss (18.5). On the other half of the defensive line, defensive end Markus White recorded seven sacks during the regular season. In total, Florida State's defense was No. 1 in college football in terms of sacks (43) and 15th in tackles for loss (7.2 per game). Florida State placed a priority on containing Tyrod Taylor and preventing him from scrambling for extra yardage. The Seminoles were 39th nationally in total defense, allowing an average of 341 yards per game.

=== Virginia Tech defense ===
Virginia Tech's defense was less statistically successful in 2010 than it had been in previous years, but the Hokies still led the nation in turnover margin, forcing 16 more turnovers than they gave away. Sophomore cornerback Jayron Hosley, a first-team All-ACC selection, led the nation in interceptions with eight, while Davon Morgan and Rashad Carmichael each had four. Tech's defense ranked 10th in the red zone, seven spots ahead of the Seminoles' defense in that respect. In total defense, the Hokies were 42nd, permitting an average of 349 yards per game. In scoring defense, Tech was third in the ACC, permitting 17.9 points per game.

== Game summary ==
The 2010 ACC Championship Game kicked off on December 4, 2010, at 7:52 pm EST at Bank of America Stadium in Charlotte, North Carolina. At kickoff, the weather was overcast with light rain and a temperature of 36 °F (2 °C), "dreary and chilly", according to The Associated Press. The wind was from the east at 4 miles per hour (6.4 km/h). The number of tickets sold was 72,379, slightly less than capacity, and despite the chilly temperatures, early turnstile figures reported more than 60,000 people in attendance. The game was televised in the United States by ESPN, and Sean McDonough, Matt Millen and Heather Cox were the announcers. The game also appeared on ESPN 3D, and was broadcast on that channel by Joe Tessitore, Tim Brown and Ray Bentley. Approximately 3.047 million people watched the game, earning the broadcast a Nielsen rating of 1.8. That figure was the second-lowest ever for an ACC Championship Game, but 13% more than the previous year's rating of 1.6, the record low. The game's referee was Brad Allen, the umpire was Jim Hyson and the lineman was Art Hardin.

=== First quarter ===
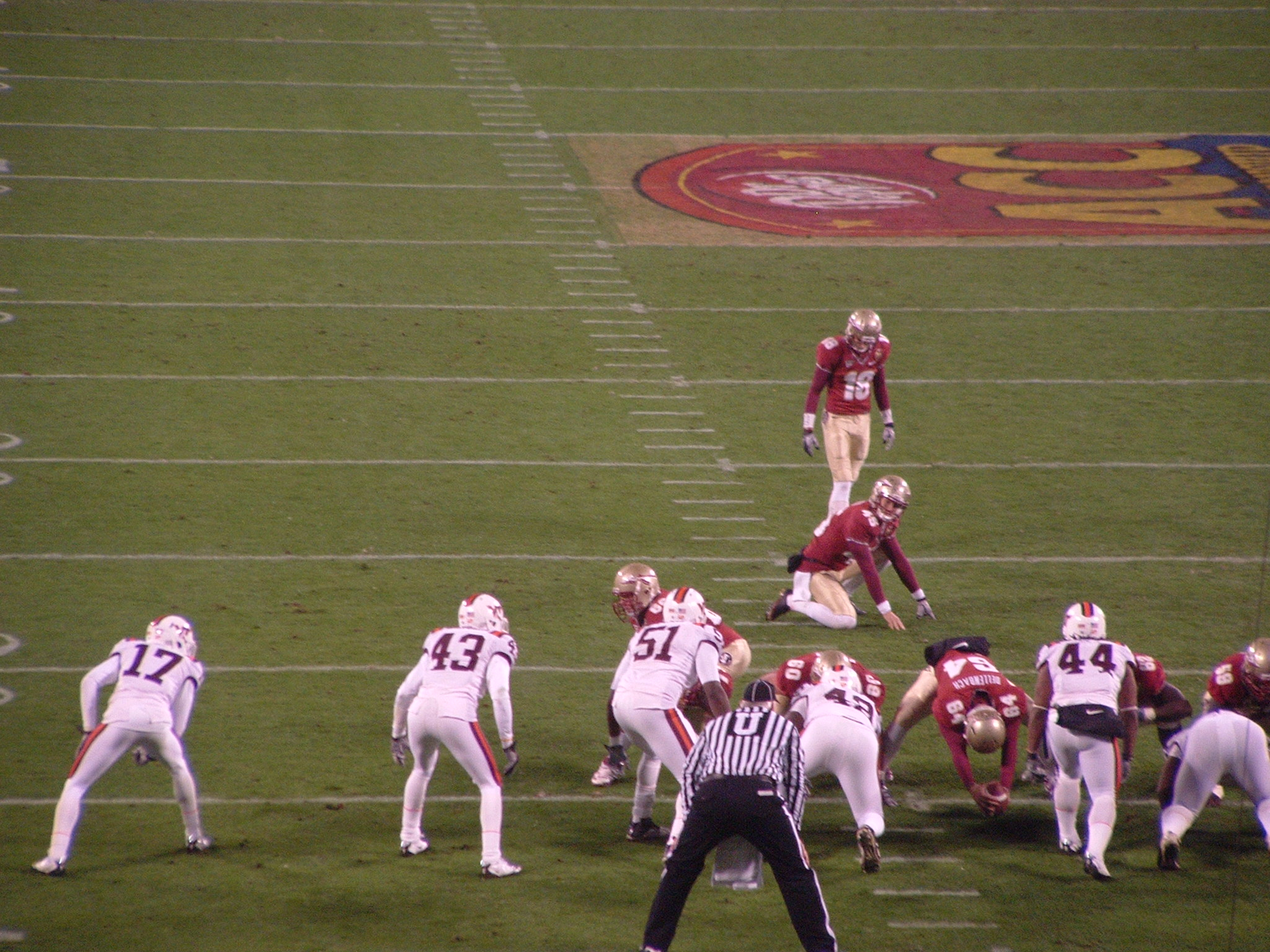
Florida State lines up to attempt a field goal in the first quarter. The successful attempt was the first score of the game, putting the Seminoles up 3–0

Virginia Tech won the ceremonial pregame coin toss to determine first possession and decided to kick off to Florida State. Kickoff returner Lonnie Pryor mishandled the football, but quickly recovered the loose ball and carried it to the Florida State 33-yard line, where the Seminoles began their first offensive drive. On the first play of the game, quarterback E. J. Manuel completed a 29-yard pass to wide receiver Taiwan Easterling, driving the Seminoles into Virginia Tech's defensive half. A short rush and a subsequent 12-yard pass gave Florida State a first down near the Virginia Tech 20-yard line. Short rushes pushed Florida State's offense inside the Virginia Tech red zone, but the Seminoles were unable to gain another first down. Placekicker Dustin Hopkins came on the field and kicked a 32-yard field goal, giving Florida State a 3–0 lead with 11:43 remaining in the quarter.

Virginia Tech's first possession began at its 20-yard line after a touchback. The Hokies advanced the ball into Florida State with a series of rushing plays, then lost yardage and punted from their 47-yard line. Florida State recovered the kick at its 15-yard line and began its second possession. On the second play of the drive, Seminoles quarterback attempted a pass, but the ball was intercepted by Virginia Tech defender Jeron Gouveia-Winslow, who ran it 24 yards into the end zone for Virginia Tech's first touchdown. The score gave Tech a 7–3 lead with 8:54 remaining in the quarter.

Florida State received the post-score kickoff, then went three-and-out. Virginia Tech recovered the kick at its 35-yard line, and began a drive that needed only three plays to score a touchdown. The key effort was a 51-yard sprint by running back Darren Evans, which advanced the ball to the Florida State 9-yard line. The score and extra point pushed Tech's lead to 14–3 with 4:37 remaining. Florida State responded with a quick touchdown drive of its own. From its 32-yard line, the Seminoles needed only six plays, three of them passes from E. J. Manuel, to reach the end zone. The score with 1:52 remaining trimmed Tech's lead to 14–10 at the 1:52 mark. As the quarter came to an end, Virginia Tech received the post-score kickoff and advanced the ball to its 22-yard line before the final seconds ticked off the clock and the first quarter ended with Tech leading 14–10.

=== Second quarter ===
The second quarter began with Virginia Tech in possession of the ball and facing a third and nine at its 22-yard line. On the first play of the quarter, Virginia Tech quarterback Tyrod Taylor completed a 28-yard pass to wide receiver Danny Coale for a first down at the 50-yard line. Tech continued to advance down the field, and eight plays later, Taylor completed a 19-yard pass to Jarret Boykin for the Hokies' third touchdown of the game. The drive consumed 13 plays and covered 91 yards in 6:25, and Tech gained a 21–10 lead with 10:28 remaining before halftime.

Following the touchdown, Virginia Tech kicked the ball off to Florida State, and after a short return, the Seminoles' offense took the field at their 22-yard line. Florida State then embarked upon a 10-play, 78-yard drive that resulted in a touchdown with 5:40 remaining in the quarter. During the drive, Florida State converted two third downs and Manuel completed passes of 12 yards, 14 yards and 25 yards.

Tech's Jayron Hosley returned Florida State's subsequent kickoff to the Tech 35-yard line, where the Hokies' offense returned to the field. Tech advanced the ball with short rushes, gaining two first downs via quarterback sneaks from Taylor. The Hokies advanced as far as the Florida State 44-yard line, but Florida State sacked Taylor twice, denying the Hokies another first down. Tech ran down the clock, then punted with 42 seconds remaining in the first half. Rather than attempt to score in the final seconds, Florida State kneeled on the ball and let the first half end with Tech leading, 21–17.

=== Third quarter ===
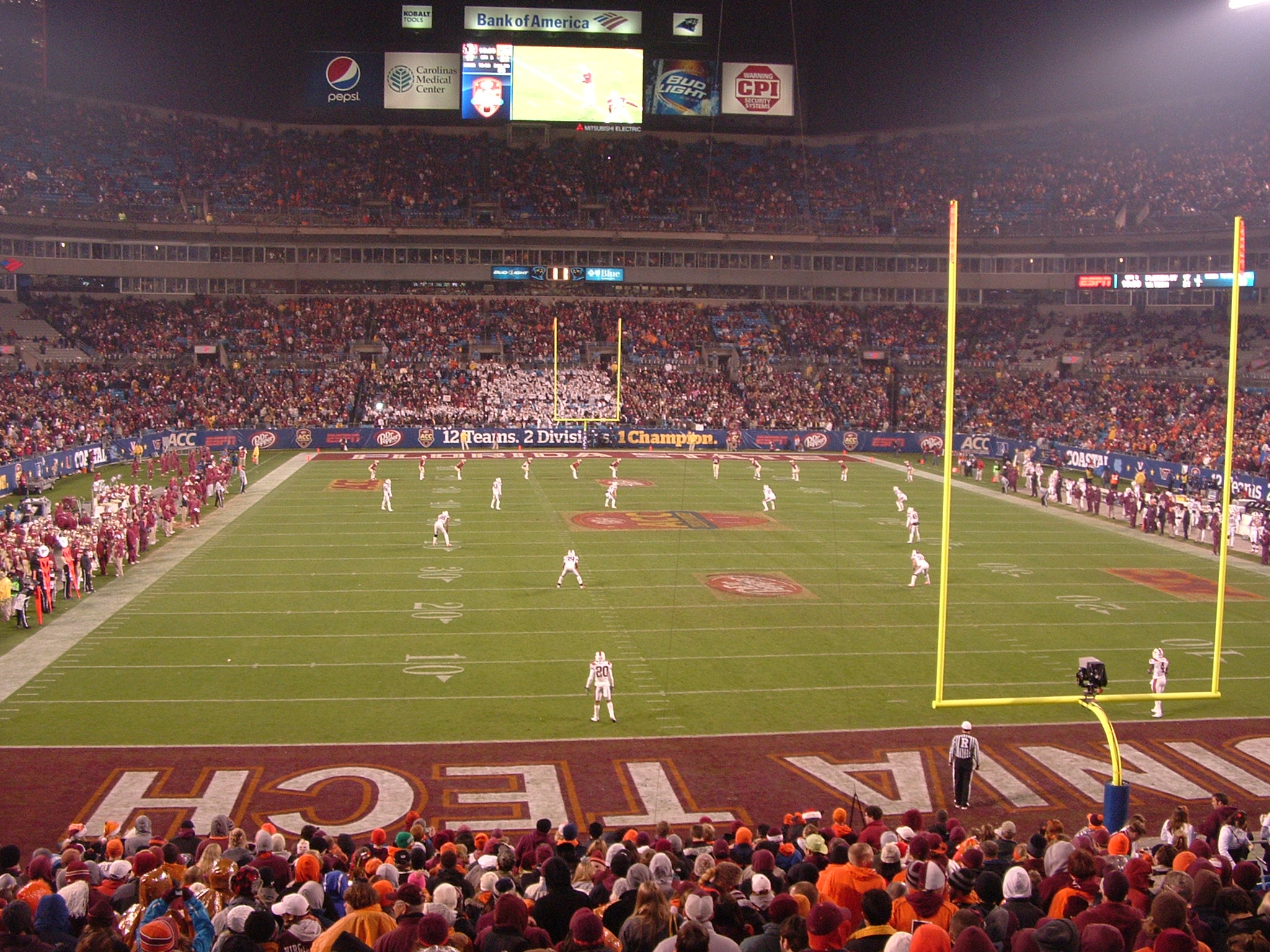
Virginia Tech prepares to receive the kickoff to begin the second half.

Because Florida State received the ball to begin the game, Virginia Tech received the ball to begin the second half. Running back David Wilson returned the opening kickoff to the Tech 21-yard line, and the Hokies' offense began the first drive of the second half. The first play of the quarter was a 14-yard pass from Taylor to Coale, beginning a seven-play, 67-yard drive resulting in a touchdown. The culminating play of the drive was a 45-yard pass from Taylor to Coale for the touchdown, which extended Tech's lead to 11 points, 28–17, at the 11:24 mark of the quarter.

After the kickoff, Florida State went three-and-out and punted back to Virginia Tech. The Hokies began their second possession of the quarter at their 39-yard line and started the drive with five consecutive running plays, advancing 28 yards in the process. Tech then switched to its passing offense, throwing four consecutive passes. Three were complete, and the final one, a 21-yard toss from Taylor to Wilson, ended with the running back carrying the ball into the end zone. The score capped a nine-play, 61-yard drive that grew the Hokies' advantage to 18 points, 35–17.

Florida State's offense returned to the field with 4:35 remaining and needing to score rapidly in order to make up the 18-point deficit, the game's largest. The Seminoles began their drive with their passing offense, trying three passes in four plays. Quarterback Manuel completed two of those three pass attempts, gaining 37 yards and advancing deep into Virginia Tech territory. A pass interference penalty against Virginia Tech advanced the Seminoles to the Tech 11-yard line, and three rushing plays later, running back Ty Jones crossed the goal line for a touchdown. The score came with 1:40 remaining in the quarter and brought the score to 35–24.

Florida State kicked off following the score, and Tech's offense began work from its 18-yard line. Though quarterback Taylor was sacked on the first play of the drive, the Hokies recovered the lost yardage and gained a first down with the final play of the quarter. With one quarter remaining in the game, Tech held a 35–24 lead.

=== Fourth quarter ===
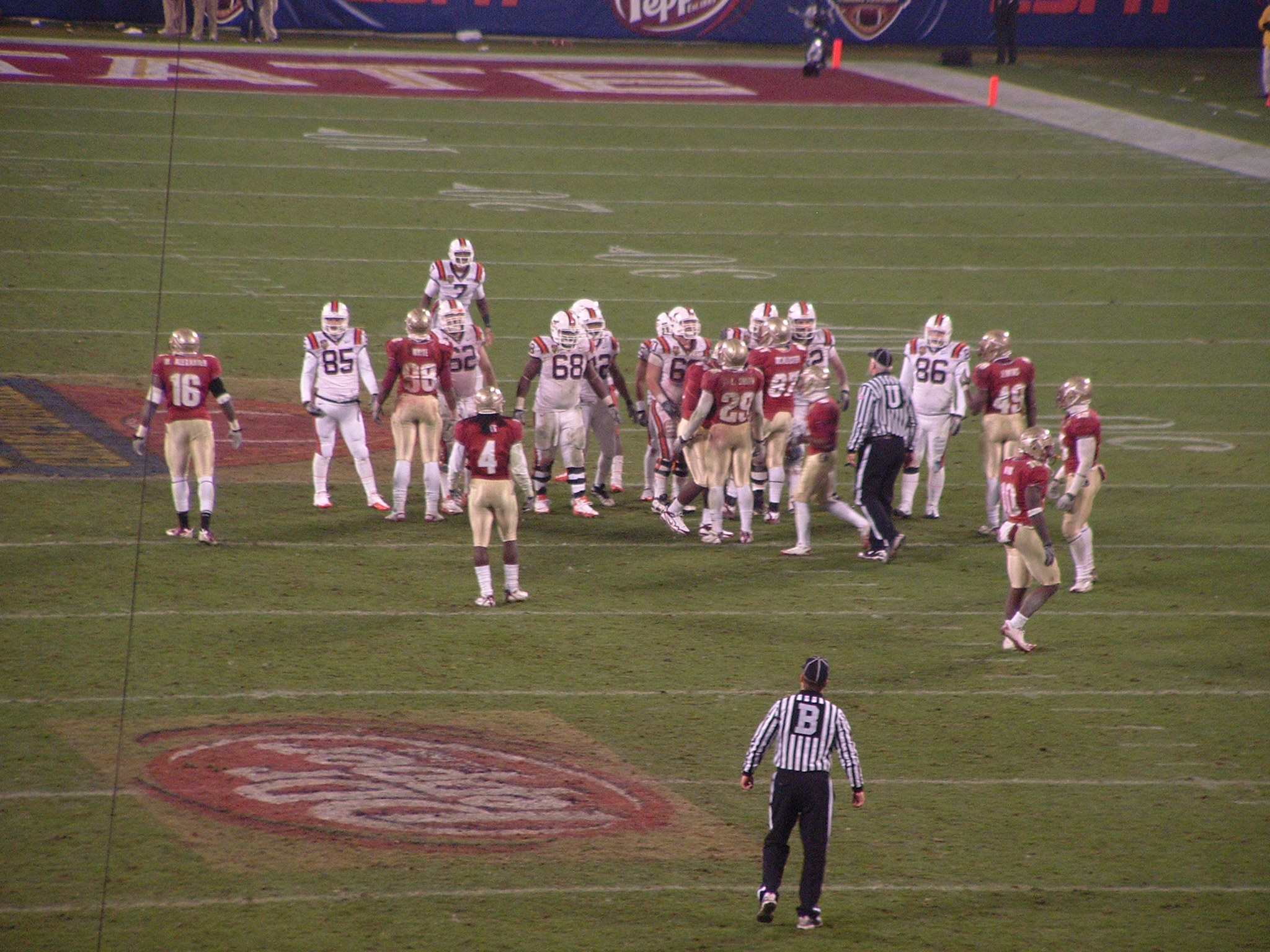
The two teams line up for the final play of the game. Virginia Tech quarterback Tyrod Taylor kneeled with the ball to run out the clock and end the game.

Virginia Tech began the quarter with a first down at its 29-yard line. After Williams carried the ball for a four-yard gain, Taylor completed a 14-yard pass to Andre Smith for a first down at the Tech 47-yard line. Two plays gained only one yard, then Taylor completed a 46-yard throw to Coale for a first down at the Florida State 6-yard line. Three plays later, Taylor ran five yards into the end zone, finishing an 11-play, 82-yard drive that spanned two quarters. Tech increased its margin to 41–24, but as Virginia Tech attempted the extra point, Florida State's Nigel Bradham disrupted and blocked the kick. Bradham scooped up the loose ball and returned it the length of the field to the opposite end zone for an unusual defensive two-point conversion.

The conversion brought the score to 41–26 with 11:29 remaining in the game. Florida State received the post-touchdown kickoff, then benefited from a 10-yard holding penalty against Virginia Tech. Three subsequent plays failed to gain another first down, however, and on fourth down, a pass by Manuel was intercepted by Virginia Tech's Davon Morgan and returned to the Florida State 34-yard line. With 9:29 remaining, Virginia Tech's offense entered the game. The Hokies went three-and-out, but capitalized on the good starting field position by kicking a 43-yard field goal that increased their lead to 44–26.

Florida State's offense began work from its 36-yard line, but ran four plays without gaining a first down and turned the ball over on downs. Virginia Tech, whose offense began at the Florida State 45-yard line, proceeded to run down the clock. In eight plays, Tech advanced 21 yards and drained 3:22, then turned the ball over on downs at the Seminole 26-yard line. Florida State's offense entered the game one final time and conducted a 12-play, 75-yard drive that ended with a 20-yard pass from Manuel to running back Chris Thompson for a touchdown. The score and subsequent extra point made the score 44–33, but only seven seconds remained in the game. The Seminoles attempted an onside kick in an attempt to have another opportunity for offense, but the Hokies recovered the kick and proceeded to run out the final seconds, earning a 44–33 victory.

== Statistical summary ==
Statistical comparison
	FSU	VT
1st downs	19	21
Total yards	341	436
Passing yards	288	263
Rushing yards	53	173
Penalties	0–0	4–36
3rd down conversions	6–12	13–18
4th down conversions	1–3	1–2
Red zone efficiency	5–5	3–3
Red Zone Touchdowns	4–5	3–3
Red Zone Field Goals	1–5	0–0
Turnovers	2	0
Time of Possession	24:59	35:01

In recognition of his performance as the game's winning quarterback, Tyrod Taylor was named the game's most valuable player. He completed 18 of his 28 pass attempts for 263 yards and three touchdowns. The three touchdowns gave him 23 for the season, setting a Virginia Tech single-season mark. The three touchdowns also tied the record for the most in an ACC Championship Game. Taylor also carried the ball 11 times for 24 yards and one touchdown. Taylor's MVP award was his second, and he became the first player to win the honor multiple times. On the opposite side of the ball, Florida State quarterback E. J. Manuel had a better completion percentage, completing 23 of his 31 passes for 288 yards and one touchdown. He also ran the ball 11 times for nine yards.

Virginia Tech wide receiver Danny Coale's 143 receiving yards were a career-high and set a championship-game record. Many of those receiving yards came on third down and were a reason why Tech converted 13 of its 17 third-down opportunities, setting another championship-game record. Florida State's leading receiver was wide receiver Taiwan Easterling, who had six catches for 79 yards. Close behind was wide receiver Willie Haulstead, who had three receptions for 73 yards. All of Haulstead's receptions came in the first half, setting a record for receiving yards in an ACC Championship Game half.

On the ground, Virginia Tech running back Darren Evans led all rushers with 69 yards on six carries. In total, Virginia Tech had 179 rushing yards; three players had more rushing yards than the leading rusher on Florida State, running back Ty Jones, who had 24 yards. Jones also had three rushing touchdowns, becoming the first Florida State player to rush for three touchdowns since October 4, 2008. He also was the second player ever to rush for three touchdowns in an ACC Championship Game.

Among defensive players, Florida State safety Nick Moody had 12 tackles, the most in the game. Virginia Tech's leading defensive player was safety Eddie Whitley, who had nine tackles and two pass breakups. Tech's Davon Morgan and Jeron Gouveia-Winslow were responsible for the only turnovers in the game; each had one interception. Gouveia-Winslow's 24-yard interception return for a touchdown was the second such score in an ACC Championship Game. On the opposite side of the ball, Nigel Bradham's defensive two-point conversion was only the fifth in all of college football during the 2010 season. Florida State received no penalties during the game, and Virginia Tech received only four. The four penalties were the fewest in an ACC Championship Game.

== Postgame effects ==
Virginia Tech's win in the ACC Championship Game, its first against Florida State in postseason play, brought it to an 11–2 record, while Florida State's loss dropped it to a 9–4 record. Virginia Tech became the first team in college football history to win 11 consecutive games after losing its first two of the season, and it was the first team in conference history to defeat nine different ACC teams in one season. Virginia Tech head coach Frank Beamer became only the second coach in ACC history to win four conference titles in seven years. The first to do so was Florida State's Bobby Bowden. Both teams' standings in the national polls were affected by the game. In the BCS poll, the Seminoles fell from 21st to out of the poll, while Virginia Tech rose from 15th to 13th. In the AP Poll, Tech rose to 12th, while Florida State fell to 23rd.

As a reward for winning the ACC Championship, the Hokies received a position in the 2011 Orange Bowl, a Bowl Championship Series game. Virginia Tech's opponent in that game was the Stanford Cardinal, from the Pac-12 Conference. In that game, a blowout in favor of the Cardinal, Stanford defeated Virginia Tech 40–12. Florida State, meanwhile, was selected to participate in the 2010 Chick-fil-A Bowl against South Carolina. In that game, held New Year's Eve, the Seminoles defeated South Carolina, 26–17.

Several players from each team participated in all-star games following their teams' respective bowl games. Virginia Tech quarterback Tyrod Taylor and center Beau Warren played in the East–West Shrine Game, Florida State quarterback Christian Ponder and offensive lineman Rodney Hudson played in the 2011 Senior Bowl. In that game, Ponder, who had been held out of the ACC Championship Game and underwent elbow surgery, guided the South team to victory by throwing two touchdown passes. The two games were a final chance to impress National Football League scouts before the 2011 NFL draft, which began April 28.

Florida State had three players selected in the draft, including Ponder, who was taken with the 12th overall selection, making him the first participant from the 2010 ACC Championship Game to be picked. Florida State's two other selections were offensive lineman Rodney Hudson (55th overall) and defensive end Markus White (224th). Virginia Tech likewise had three players selected: Ryan Williams (38th), Rashad Carmichael (127th), and Tyrod Taylor (180th).
