= 2010 North Carolina Tar Heels football team =

American college football season

2010 North Carolina Tar Heels football

Music City Bowl champion

Music City Bowl, W 30–27 ^{2OT} vs. Tennessee
- Conference: Atlantic Coast Conference
- Coastal Division
- Record: 8–5 (4–4 ACC)
- Head coach: Butch Davis (4th season)
- Offensive coordinator: John Shoop (4th season)
- Offensive scheme: Pro-style
- Defensive coordinator: Everett Withers (3rd season)
- Base defense: 4–3
- Captains: T. J. Yates; Johnny White; Bruce Carter; Tydreke Powell; Ryan Taylor; Zach Brown
- Home stadium: Kenan Memorial Stadium

2010 Atlantic Coast Conference football standings
	Conf.			Overall
Team	W		L	W		L
Atlantic Division
No. 17 Florida State x	6	–	2	10	–	4
No. 23 Maryland	5	–	3	9	–	4
No. 25 NC State	5	–	3	9	–	4
Boston College	4	–	4	7	–	6
Clemson	4	–	4	6	–	7
Wake Forest	1	–	7	3	–	9
Coastal Division
No. 16 Virginia Tech x$	8	–	0	11	–	3
Miami (FL)	5	–	3	7	–	6
Georgia Tech	4	–	4	6	–	7
North Carolina	4	–	4	8	–	5
Duke	1	–	7	3	–	9
Virginia	1	–	7	4	–	8
Championship: Virginia Tech 44, Florida State 33
$ – BCS representative as conference champion; x – Division champion/co-champions; Rankings from AP Poll

The 2010 North Carolina Tar Heels football team represented the University of North Carolina at Chapel Hill as a member of Coastal Division of the Atlantic Coast Conference (ACC) during the 2010 NCAA Division I FBS football season. Led by fourth-year head coach Butch Davis, the Tar Heels played their home games at Kenan Memorial Stadium in Chapel Hill, North Carolina. North Carolina finished the season 8–5 overall and 4–4 in ACC play to tie for third in the Coastal Division. They were invited to the Music City Bowl, where they defeated Tennessee, 30–27, in two overtimes.

== Schedule ==
Date	Time	Opponent	Rank	Site	TV	Result	Attendance	Source
September 4	8:00 p.m.	vs. No. 21 LSU*	No. 18	Georgia Dome; Atlanta, GA (Chick-fil-A Kickoff Game, College GameDay)	ABC	L 24–30	68,919	
September 18	12:00 p.m.	Georgia Tech		Kenan Memorial Stadium; Chapel Hill, NC	ACCN	L 24–30	58,500	
September 25	3:30 p.m.	at Rutgers*		Rutgers Stadium; Piscataway, NJ	ESPNU	W 17–13	52,038	
October 2	3:30 p.m.	East Carolina*		Kenan Memorial Stadium; Chapel Hill, NC	ESPN3	W 42–17	60,000	
October 9	3:30 p.m.	Clemson		Kenan Memorial Stadium; Chapel Hill, NC	ABC/ESPN	W 21–16	60,000	
October 16	6:00 p.m.	at Virginia		Scott Stadium; Charlottesville, VA (South's Oldest Rivalry)	ESPN3	W 44–10	50,830	
October 23	7:30 p.m.	at No. 25 Miami (FL)		Sun Life Stadium; Miami Gardens, FL	ESPN2	L 10–33	43,584	
October 30	3:30 p.m.	No. 3 (FCS) William & Mary*^{†}		Kenan Memorial Stadium; Chapel Hill, NC	ESPN3	W 21–17	51,000	
November 6	3:30 p.m.	at No. 24 Florida State		Doak Campbell Stadium; Tallahassee, FL	ABC	W 37–35	70,157	
November 13	3:30 p.m.	No. 16 Virginia Tech		Kenan Memorial Stadium; Chapel Hill, NC	ABC	L 10–26	60,000	
November 20	12:00 p.m.	NC State		Kenan Memorial Stadium; Chapel Hill, NC (rivalry)	ACCN	L 25–29	60,000	
November 27	3:30 p.m.	at Duke		Wallace Wade Stadium; Durham, NC (Victory Bell)	ESPNU	W 24–19	30,904	
December 30	6:30 p.m.	vs. Tennessee*		LP Field; Nashville, TN (Music City Bowl)	ESPN	W 30–27 ^{2OT}	69,143	
*Non-conference game; ^{†}Homecoming; Rankings from AP Poll released prior to the game; All times are in Eastern time

== NCAA investigations ==
On July 15, 2010, ESPN reported that players at the University of North Carolina were being investigated and interviewed by the NCAA for possible rules violations concerning sports agents and improper gifts. The next day, it was confirmed that certain members of the football team were thought to have received improper gifts from agents, which is not allowed by NCAA rules. Marvin Austin, one of the players suspected in the probe, had made numerous Twitter posts with questionable content, which the NCAA investigated, and he was the first UNC player to be indefinitely suspended, though for violation of team rules, and not the NCAA probe. Butch Davis, the head coach, did not say much about the probe, as he, and many others, expected a quick resolution to the investigation, and he was known for running a clean program. Soon after though, the NCAA began to look at defensive line coach John Blake, his relationship with certain agents, and whether or not he had received money from them. He later resigned. Also, former UNC lineman Kentwan Balmer admitted that he had paid for a trip to California for two current players. It soon became apparent that things would be much worse, and 13 players were suspended for the opening game. Furthermore, the university launched its own probe, and found academic misconduct within the football team.

== NFL draft ==
Twelve Tar Heels were invited to the NFL Scouting Combine, more than any other team in the nation. Nineteen players participated in the annual university pro day, which attracted nearly 100 scouts and coaches from the National Football League (NFL). Many of the players participating, however, missed either part or all of the games played this season due to the above-mentioned investigation. With nine players selected in the 2011 NFL draft, the Tar Heels were tied with USC for the most players selected.

Round	Pick	Player	Position	NFL Team
1	14	Robert Quinn*	DE	St. Louis Rams
2	40	Bruce Carter	OLB	Dallas Cowboys
2	52	Marvin Austin*	DT	New York Giants
2	59	Greg Little*	WR	Cleveland Browns
4	100	Da'Norris Searcy†	SS	Buffalo Bills
5	133	Johnny White	RB	Buffalo Bills
5	152	T. J. Yates	QB	Houston Texans
5	171	Quan Sturdivant	ILB	Arizona Cardinals
7	218	Ryan Taylor	TE	Green Bay Packers

* Did not play in the 2010 season due to investigation

† missed part of the 2010 season due to investigation
