= 2010 Florida State Seminoles football team =

American college football season

2010 Florida State Seminoles football

ACC Atlantic Division champion Chick-fil-A Bowl champion

ACC Championship, L 33–44 vs. Virginia Tech

Chick-fil-A Bowl, W 26–17 vs. South Carolina
- Conference: Atlantic Coast Conference
- Atlantic Division

Ranking
- Coaches: No. 16
- AP: No. 17
- Record: 10–4 (6–2 ACC)
- Head coach: Jimbo Fisher (1st season)
- Offensive coordinator: James Coley (1st season)
- Offensive scheme: Pro-style
- Defensive coordinator: Mark Stoops (1st season)
- Base defense: 4–3
- Captains: Christian Ponder; Rodney Hudson; Ochuko Jenije; Markus White
- Home stadium: Doak Campbell Stadium (Capacity: 82,300)

2010 Atlantic Coast Conference football standings
	Conf.			Overall
Team	W		L	W		L
Atlantic Division
No. 17 Florida State x	6	–	2	10	–	4
No. 23 Maryland	5	–	3	9	–	4
No. 25 NC State	5	–	3	9	–	4
Boston College	4	–	4	7	–	6
Clemson	4	–	4	6	–	7
Wake Forest	1	–	7	3	–	9
Coastal Division
No. 16 Virginia Tech x$	8	–	0	11	–	3
Miami (FL)	5	–	3	7	–	6
Georgia Tech	4	–	4	6	–	7
North Carolina	4	–	4	8	–	5
Duke	1	–	7	3	–	9
Virginia	1	–	7	4	–	8
Championship: Virginia Tech 44, Florida State 33
$ – BCS representative as conference champion; x – Division champion/co-champions; Rankings from AP Poll

The 2010 Florida State Seminoles football team represented Florida State University in the 2010 NCAA Division I FBS college football season. The Seminoles were led by first-year head coach Jimbo Fisher and played their home games at Bobby Bowden Field at Doak Campbell Stadium. They were members of the Atlantic Coast Conference, playing in the Atlantic Division.

They finished the season 10–4, 6–2 in ACC play, and won the Atlantic Division to earn a spot in the ACC Championship Game where they were defeated by Virginia Tech. They were invited to the Chick-fil-A Bowl where they defeated South Carolina.

The 2010 season marked the Seminoles' first ten win season since 2003 and their first appearance in the ACC title game since 2005.

== Rankings ==
Ranking movements Legend: ██ Increase in ranking ██ Decrease in ranking — = Not ranked RV = Received votes
	Week															
Poll	Pre	1	2	3	4	5	6	7	8	9	10	11	12	13	14	Final
AP	20	17	RV	RV	RV	23	16	16	16	24	RV	RV	22	20	23	17
Coaches	20	18	RV	RV	RV	24	17	17	15	24	RV	RV	21	20	23	16
Harris	Not released						17	17	16	24	RV	25	22	20	23	Not released
BCS	Not released							17	16	24	—	25	22	21	23	Not released

== Schedule ==
Date	Time	Opponent	Rank	Site	TV	Result	Attendance
September 4	12:00 p.m.	Samford*	No. 20	Doak Campbell Stadium; Tallahassee, FL	ESPNU	W 59–6	68,438
September 11	3:30 p.m.	at No. 10 Oklahoma*	No. 17	Gaylord Family Oklahoma Memorial Stadium; Norman, OK	ABC/ESPN2	L 17–47	85,630
September 18	3:30 p.m.	BYU*		Doak Campbell Stadium; Tallahassee, FL	ESPNU	W 34–10	68,795
September 25	3:30 p.m.	Wake Forest		Doak Campbell Stadium; Tallahassee, FL	ABC	W 31–0	61,647
October 2	12:00 p.m.	at Virginia		Scott Stadium; Charlottesville, VA (Jefferson-Eppes Trophy)	ACCN	W 34–14	47,096
October 9	8:00 p.m.	at No. 13 Miami (FL)	No. 23	Sun Life Stadium; Miami Gardens, FL (rivalry)	ABC	W 45–17	75,115
October 16	12:00 p.m.	Boston College	No. 16	Doak Campbell Stadium; Tallahassee, FL	ESPN	W 24–19	75,301
October 28	7:30 p.m.	at NC State	No. 16	Carter–Finley Stadium; Raleigh, NC	ESPN	L 24–28	56,807
November 6	3:30 p.m.	North Carolina^{†}	No. 24	Doak Campbell Stadium; Tallahassee, FL	ABC	L 35–37	70,157
November 13	8:00 p.m.	Clemson		Doak Campbell Stadium; Tallahassee, FL (rivalry)	ABC	W 16–13	72,228
November 20	8:00 p.m.	at Maryland		Byrd Stadium; College Park, MD	ABC	W 30–16	48,115
November 27	3:30 p.m.	Florida*	No. 22	Doak Campbell Stadium; Tallahassee, FL (rivalry)	ABC/ESPN	W 31–7	82,324
December 4	7:45 p.m.	vs. No. 12 Virginia Tech	No. 20	Bank of America Stadium; Charlotte, NC (ACC Championship)	ESPN	L 33–44	72,379
December 31	7:30 p.m.	vs. No. 19 South Carolina*	No. 23	Georgia Dome; Atlanta, GA (Chick-fil-A Bowl)	ESPN	W 26–17	72,217
*Non-conference game; ^{†}Homecoming; Rankings from AP Poll released prior to the game; All times are in Eastern time

== Recruits ==
College recruiting information
Name	Hometown	School	Height	Weight	40^{‡}	Commit date
Chad Abram; DB	Lakeland, Florida	Kathleen Senior HS	6 ft 0 in (1.83 m)	183 lb (83 kg)	N/A	Mar 24, 2009
Chad Abram; DB	Recruit ratings: Scout: Rivals: (80)					
Terrence Brooks; DB	Dunnellon, Florida	Dunnellon HS	5 ft 10 in (1.78 m)	165 lb (75 kg)	4.44	Jul 18, 2009
Terrence Brooks; DB	Recruit ratings: Scout: Rivals: (79)					
Darious Cummings; DE	Titusville, Florida	Astronaut HS	6 ft 3 in (1.91 m)	245 lb (111 kg)	4.8	Jul 14, 2008
Darious Cummings; DE	Recruit ratings: Scout: Rivals: (81)					
Greg Dent Jr. ATH	Belle Glade, Florida	Glades Central HS	6 ft 0 in (1.83 m)	180 lb (82 kg)	4.5	Nov 26, 2009
Greg Dent Jr. ATH	Recruit ratings: Scout: Rivals: (77)					
Cameron Erving; DT	Moultrie, Georgia	Colquitt County HS	6 ft 5 in (1.96 m)	285 lb (129 kg)	N/A	Aug 26, 2009
Cameron Erving; DT	Recruit ratings: Scout: Rivals: (76)					
Dan Foose; OL	Paramus, New Jersey	Paramus Catholic HS	6 ft 6 in (1.98 m)	310 lb (140 kg)	5.3	Feb 3, 2010
Dan Foose; OL	Recruit ratings: Scout: Rivals: (75)					
Christian Green; ATH	Tampa, Florida	Tampa Catholic HS	6 ft 2 in (1.88 m)	200 lb (91 kg)	4.5	Feb 3, 2010
Christian Green; ATH	Recruit ratings: Scout: Rivals: (82)					
Jarred Haggins; ATH	Lakeland, Florida	Lakeland HS	6 ft 0 in (1.83 m)	180 lb (82 kg)	N/A	Jul 22, 2009
Jarred Haggins; ATH	Recruit ratings: Scout: Rivals: (78)					
Mike Harris; DB	Torrance, California	El Camino College	6 ft 0 in (1.83 m)	185 lb (84 kg)	N/A	Dec 3, 2009
Mike Harris; DB	Recruit ratings: Scout: Rivals: (N/A)					
Damien Jacobs; DT	Houma, Louisiana	H. L. Bourgeois HS	6 ft 3 in (1.91 m)	295 lb (134 kg)	5.1	Sep 11, 2009
Damien Jacobs; DT	Recruit ratings: Scout: Rivals: (77)					
De'Joshua Johnson; WR	Pahokee, Florida	Pahokee HS	5 ft 11 in (1.80 m)	155 lb (70 kg)	4.45	Jun 22, 2009
De'Joshua Johnson; WR	Recruit ratings: Scout: Rivals: (79)					
Christian Jones; LB	Winter Park, Florida	Lake Howell HS	6 ft 4 in (1.93 m)	220 lb (100 kg)	4.7	Feb 3, 2010
Christian Jones; LB	Recruit ratings: Scout: Rivals: (83)					
Lamarcus Joyner; DB	Fort Lauderdale, Florida	St. Thomas Aquinas HS	5 ft 8 in (1.73 m)	165 lb (75 kg)	4.4	Dec 9, 2009
Lamarcus Joyner; DB	Recruit ratings: Scout: Rivals: (87)					
Jeff Luc; LB	Port St. Lucie, Florida	Treasure Coast HS	6 ft 1 in (1.85 m)	230 lb (100 kg)	4.7	Dec 5, 2009
Jeff Luc; LB	Recruit ratings: Scout: Rivals: (85)					
Anthony McCloud; DT	Fulton, Mississippi	Itawamba Community College	6 ft 3 in (1.91 m)	295 lb (134 kg)	N/A	Nov 18, 2009
Anthony McCloud; DT	Recruit ratings: Scout: Rivals: (N/A)					
Holmes Onwukaife; LB	Cedar Park, Texas	Cedar Park HS	6 ft 3 in (1.91 m)	220 lb (100 kg)	4.5	Jul 23, 2009
Holmes Onwukaife; LB	Recruit ratings: Scout: Rivals: (78)					
Tank Sessions; TE	Decatur, Georgia	Columbia HS	6 ft 6 in (1.98 m)	230 lb (100 kg)	4.8	Jul 29, 2009
Tank Sessions; TE	Recruit ratings: Scout: Rivals: (74)					
Kenny Shaw; WR	Orlando, Florida	Dr. Phillips HS	6 ft 0 in (1.83 m)	160 lb (73 kg)	4.5	Jan 2, 2010
Kenny Shaw; WR	Recruit ratings: Scout: Rivals: (81)					
Debrale Smiley; RB	Fulton, Mississippi	Itawamba Community College	6 ft 0 in (1.83 m)	240 lb (110 kg)	4.7	Jan 29, 2009
Debrale Smiley; RB	Recruit ratings: Scout: Rivals: (N/A)					
Telvin Smith; LB	Valdosta, Georgia	Lowndes HS	6 ft 3 in (1.91 m)	196 lb (89 kg)	4.85	Jul 31, 2009
Telvin Smith; LB	Recruit ratings: Scout: Rivals: (81)					
Nigel Terrell; LB	Pelham, Alabama	Pelham HS	6 ft 2 in (1.88 m)	215 lb (98 kg)	4.5	Aug 27, 2009
Nigel Terrell; LB	Recruit ratings: Scout: Rivals: (81)					
Clint Trickett; QB	Tallahassee, Florida	North Florida Christian HS	6 ft 2 in (1.88 m)	175 lb (79 kg)	4.8	Sep 2, 2009
Clint Trickett; QB	Recruit ratings: Scout: Rivals: (75)					
Will Tye; TE	Salisbury, Connecticut	Salisbury HS	6 ft 3 in (1.91 m)	230 lb (100 kg)	4.4	Jan 16, 2010
Will Tye; TE	Recruit ratings: Scout: Rivals: (78)					
Overall recruit ranking: Scout: 8 Rivals: 1 ESPN: 9
‡ Refers to 40-yard dash; Note: In many cases, Scout, Rivals, 247Sports, On3, and ESPN may conflict in their listings of height, weight and 40 time.; In these cases, the average was taken. ESPN grades are on a 100-point scale.; Sources: "Florida State 2010 Football Commitments". Rivals.; "2010 Florida State Commits". Scout.; "2010 Player Commitments – Florida State". ESPN.; "Scout.com Team Recruiting Rankings". Scout.; "2010 Team Ranking". Rivals.com.

== Roster ==
2010 Florida State Seminoles roster
Quarterbacks: 3 EJ Manuel – (redshirt) Sophomore; 15 Brandon Parks – (redshirt) Senior; 7 Christian Ponder – (redshirt) Senior; 16 Will Secord – (redshirt) Freshman; 9 Clint Trickett – Freshman; Running backs: 33 Ty Jones – Junior; 39 Tavares Pressley – Senior; 24 Lonnie Pryor – Sophomore; 21 Debrale Smiley – (redshirt) Sophomore; 38 Jermaine Thomas – Junior; 23 Chris Thompson – Sophomore; Fullback: 40 Matthew Dunham – (redshirt) Senior; 48 Daniel Gard – (redshirt) Senior; 32 Brandon Simmons – (redshirt) Senior; Wide receivers: 26 A.J. Alexander – (redshirt) Sophomore; 35 Greg Dent – Freshman; 8 Taiwan Easterling – (redshirt) Junior; 80 Jarmon Fortson – Junior; 19 Josh Gehres – (redshirt) Freshman; 89 Christian Green – Freshman; 36 Jarred Haggins – Freshman; 82 Willie Haulstead – Sophomore; 86 De'Joshua Johnson – Freshman; 39 Nick Myers – (redshirt) Sophomore; 11 Timothy Orange – (redshirt) Junior; 83 Bert Reed – (redshirt) Junior; 35 Gerald Rogers – (redshirt) Freshman; 81 Kenny Shaw – Freshman; 84 Rodney Smith – Sophomore; 22 Austin Stowers – Sophomore; 87 Cameron Wade – (redshirt) Junior; Tight ends: 46 Jonathan Johnson – (redshirt) Sophomore; 85 Ja'Baris Little – Junior; 88 Beau Reliford – Junior; 47 Tank Sessions – Freshman; 44 Will Tye – Freshman; 47 Jonathan Wallace – (redshirt) Freshman	Offensive line: 67 Andrew Datko – Junior; 76 Garrett Faircloth – Sophomore; 72 Daniel Foose – Freshman; 63 A.J. Ganguzza – (redshirt) Junior; 70 Antwane Greenlee – (redshirt) Junior; 62 Rodney Hudson – Senior; 64 Emory Mandala – (redshirt) Freshman; 60 Ryan McMahon – (redshirt) Senior; 59 Henry Orelus – (redshirt) Freshman; 77 Zebrie Sanders – Junior; 73 Rhonne Sanderson – (redshirt) Sophomore; 61 Blake Snider – Sophomore; 79 David Spurlock – Junior; 66 Jacob Stanley – (redshirt) Junior; 52 Bryan Stork – (redshirt) Freshman; Defensive line: 71 Garan Bertrand – Senior; 78 Shayne Broxsie – (redshirt) Freshman; 94 Darious Cummings – Freshman; 93 Everett Dawkins – (redshirt) Sophomore; 74 Cameron Erving – Freshman; 58 Dan Hicks – (redshirt) Freshman; 55 Jamar Jackson – (redshirt) Junior; 91 Damien Jacobs – Freshman; 49 Brandon Jenkins – Sophomore; 68 John Jones – (redshirt) Sophomore; 73 Neil Goldsmith – (redshirt) Junior; 97 Demonte McAllister – (redshirt) Freshman; 92 Anthony McCloud – (redshirt) Sophomore; 90 Moses McCray – Junior; 99 Jacobbi McDaniel – Sophomore; 66 Joshua Rodriguez – (redshirt) Junior; 96 Toshmon Stevens – (redshirt) Sophomore; 95 Björn Werner – Freshman; 98 Markus White – Senior	Linebackers: 16 Mister Alexander – (redshirt) Senior; 13 Nigel Bradham – Junior; 42 Ronald Britzius – (redshirt) Freshman; 12 Nigel Carr – Junior; 7 Christian Jones – Freshman; 54 A.J. Land – (redshirt) Junior; 48 Jeff Luc – Freshman; 57 Holmes Onwukaife – Freshman; 29 Kendall Smith – Senior; 22 Telvin Smith – Freshman; 43 Nigel Terrell – Freshman; 11 Vince Williams – (redshirt) Sophomore; 46 Vincent Zann – (redshirt) Junior; Defensive backs: 41 Chad Abram – Freshman; 28 Dionte Allen – (redshirt) Junior; 31 Terrence Brooks – Freshman; 14 Avis Commack – Junior; 38 Darren Edwards – (redshirt) Junior; 1 Mike Harris – Junior; 15 Ochuko Jenije – (redshirt) Senior; 20 Lamarcus Joyner – Freshman; 5 Greg Reid – Sophomore; 27 Xavier Rhodes – Sophomore; 20 Eli Tatem – (redshirt) Junior; 39 Joshua Thomas – Freshman; Deep snappers: 75 Philip Doumar – (redshirt) Freshman; 69 Chris Revell – (redshirt) Freshman; Safeties: 3 Justin Bright – (redshirt) Freshman; 8 Chad Colley – (redshirt) Freshman; 6 Gerald Demps – (redshirt) Freshman; 30 Jajuan Harley – Sophomore; 37 Ed Imeokparia – (redshirt) Sophomore; 10 Nick Moody – (redshirt) Sophomore; 4 Terrance Parks – Junior	Punters: 45 Shawn Powell – Junior; Kickers: 18 Dustin Hopkins – Sophomore; 1 Alex Jones – (redshirt) Freshman; Head coach: Jimbo Fisher; Assistant coaches: James Coley – Offensive coordinator/TE Coach; Dameyune Craig – Recruiting doordinator/QB Coach; Lawrence Dawsey – Passing Game Coordinator/WR Coach; D. J. Eliot – DE Coach; Eddie gran – Associate head coach/ST Coordinator/RB Coach; Odell Haggins – DT Coach; Greg Hudson – Assistant head coach/LB Coach; Mark Stoops – Defensive coordinator/DB Coach; Rick Trickett – Assistant head coach/OL Coach; Vic Viloria – Head Strength & Conditioning Coach; Travis Trickett – Graduate assistant; E. Bradley – Defensive line Student Assistant Coach

== Regular season ==
=== Samford ===
In Jimbo Fisher's first game as Head Coach, the 'Noles dominated the Samford Bulldogs. The first points of the game came on a 4-yard pass from Christian Ponder to fullback Lonnie Pryor. Florida State put 35 points on the board in the second quarter, thanks to three TD passes by Ponder (B. Reed, L. Pryor, T. Easterling), a 4-yard run by Jermaine Thomas, and a 74-yard punt return by Greg Reid. Samford kicked a FG as time expired to make the score 42–3 heading into halftime. The 'Noles were on cruise control this game and in the second half FSU's backups hung another 17 on Samford, and only allowed 3 points. Jimbo Fisher couldn't have asked for a better first game. The same can not be said for Week 2's trip to Norman.

Samford at Florida State

Team	1	2	3	4	Total
Samford	0	3	3	0	6
• #20 Florida State	7	35	7	10	59

- Date: September 4
- Location: Doak Campbell Stadium
  Tallahassee, Florida
- Game start: 12:00 p.m.
- Game attendance: 68,438
- TV announcers (ESPNU): Rob Stone, David Pollack

=== Oklahoma ===
After Week 1's blowout victory against Samford, the FSU fanbase started to have a confidence about it. That confidence was quickly shattered and beaten as FSU got man-handled in Norman, Oklahoma by Bob Stoop's Sooners. The defense got shredded, allowing 47 points, and allowing Landry Jones to look like a Heisman candidate. The offense got shut down after scoring a TD on their first possession. The confidence had turned into a gut-wrenching memory of the 2009 team. But, the 'Noles would rebound.

Florida State at Oklahoma

Team	1	2	3	4	Total
#17 Florida State	7	0	0	10	17
• #10 Oklahoma	14	20	10	3	47

- Date: September 11
- Location: Gaylord Family Oklahoma Memorial Stadium
  Norman, Oklahoma
- Game start: 3:30 p.m.
- Game attendance: 85,630
- TV announcers (ABC/ESPN2): Sean McDonough, Matt Millen, Jeannine Edwards

=== BYU ===
The 'Noles kicked off a 5-game win streak against BYU after getting routed by Oklahoma a week before. The 'Noles run game was excellent as it accounted for 278 yards and 3 TD's. Christian Ponder bounced back from an awful performance against Oklahoma, completing 66% of his passes, throwing zero interceptions, and adding 50 yards with his feet. Chris Thompson ran for 123 yards, 83 of which came on one touchdown run. Ty Jones added another 95 and a touchdown. The FSU defense dominated most of the game by only allowing 191 yards and 10 points.

BYU at Florida State

Team	1	2	3	4	Total
BYU	0	10	0	0	10
• Florida State	3	10	14	7	34

- Date: September 18
- Location: Doak Campbell Stadium
  Tallahassee, Florida
- Game start: 3:30 p.m.
- Game attendance: 68,795
- TV announcers (ESPNU): Pam Ward, Danny Kanell

=== Wake Forest ===
Wake Forest at Florida State

Team	1	2	3	4	Total
Wake Forest	0	0	0	0	0
• Florida State	0	10	7	14	31

- Date: September 25
- Location: Doak Campbell Stadium
  Tallahassee, Florida
- Game start: 3:30 p.m.
- Game attendance: 61,647
- TV announcers (ABC): Mike Patrick, Craig James

=== Virginia ===
Florida State at Virginia

Team	1	2	3	4	Total
• Florida State	10	17	7	0	34
Virginia	0	0	7	7	14

- Date: October 2
- Location: Scott Stadium
  Charlottesville, Virginia
- Game start: 12:00 p.m.
- Game attendance: 47,096
- TV announcers (ACC Network): Steve Martin, Dave Archer, Mike Hogewood

=== Miami (FL) ===
Florida State at Miami (FL)

Team	1	2	3	4	Total
• #23 Florida State	7	17	7	14	45
#13 Miami (FL)	0	7	10	0	17

- Date: October 9
- Location: Sun Life Stadium
  Miami Gardens, Florida
- Game start: 8:00 p.m.
- Game attendance: 75,115
- TV announcers (ABC): Brent Musburger, Kirk Herbstreit, Heather Cox

=== Boston College ===
Boston College at Florida State

Team	1	2	3	4	Total
Boston College	6	0	10	3	19
• #16 Florida State	7	7	3	7	24

- Date: October 16
- Location: Doak Campbell Stadium
  Tallahassee, Florida
- Game start: 12:00 p.m.
- Game attendance: 75,301
- TV announcers (ESPN): Mike Patrick, Craig James

=== North Carolina State ===
Florida State at North Carolina State

Team	1	2	3	4	Total
#16 Florida State	0	21	0	3	24
• North Carolina State	7	0	14	7	28

- Date: October 28
- Location: Carter–Finley Stadium
  Raleigh, North Carolina
- Game start: 7:30 p.m.
- Game attendance: 56,807
- TV announcers (ESPN2): Rece Davis, Craig James, Jesse Palmer, Jenn Brown

=== North Carolina ===
North Carolina at Florida State

Team	1	2	3	4	Total
• North Carolina	14	7	10	6	37
#24 Florida State	7	21	0	7	35

- Date: November 6
- Location: Doak Campbell Stadium
  Tallahassee, Florida
- Game start: 3:30 p.m.
- Game attendance: 70,157
- TV announcers (ABC): Mike Patrick, Craig James

=== Clemson ===
Clemson at Florida State

Team	1	2	3	4	Total
Clemson	7	3	0	3	13
• Florida State	3	0	3	10	16

- Date: November 13
- Location: Doak Campbell Stadium
  Tallahassee, Florida
- Game start: 8:00 p.m.
- Game attendance: 72,228
- TV announcers (ABC): Mike Patrick, Craig James, Jeannine Edwards

=== Maryland ===
Florida State at Maryland

Team	1	2	3	4	Total
• #25 Florida State	10	3	7	10	30
Maryland	3	10	3	0	16

- Date: November 20
- Location: Byrd Stadium
  College Park, Maryland
- Game start: 8:00 p.m.
- Game attendance: 48,115
- TV announcers (ABC): Mike Patrick, Craig James

=== Florida ===
Florida at Florida State

Team	1	2	3	4	Total
Florida	7	0	0	0	7
• #22 Florida State	3	21	7	0	31

- Date: November 27
- Location: Doak Campbell Stadium
  Tallahassee, Florida
- Game start: 3:30 p.m. EST
- Game attendance: 82,324
- TV announcers (ABC/ESPN): Bob Wischusen, Brian Griese

Scoring summary
Q1	12:38	FSU	Hopkins 38 yard field goal	FSU 3–0
Q1	10:43	FLA	Clark 20 yard pass from Brantley (Henry kick)	FLA 7–3
Q2	12:06	FSU	Pryor 9 yard run (Hopkins kick)	FSU 10–7
Q2	10:45	FSU	Smith 39 yard pass from Ponder (Hopkins kick)	FSU 17–7
Q2	2:47	FSU	Easterling 15 yard pass from Ponder (Hopkins kick)	FSU 24–7
Q3	9:19	FSU	Haulstead 29 yard pass from Ponder (Hopkins kick)	FSU 31–7

Florida State ended a six-game losing streak to its archrival.

=== ACC Championship Game: Virginia Tech ===
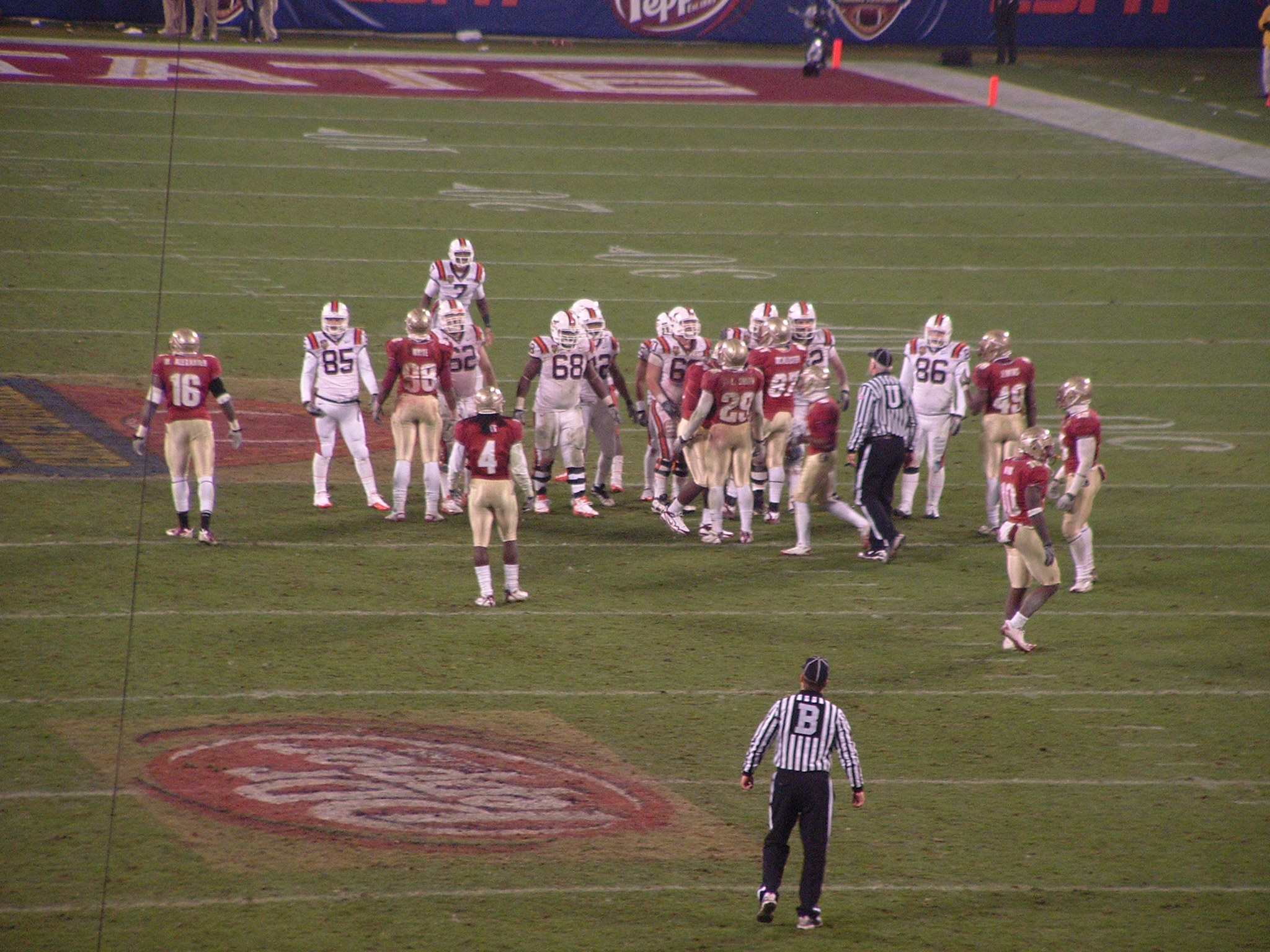
Florida State played Virginia Tech in the ACC Championship.

ACC Championship Game: Florida State vs. Virginia Tech

Team	1	2	3	4	Total
#20 Florida State	10	7	7	9	33
• #12 Virginia Tech	14	7	14	9	44

- Date: December 4
- Location: Bank of America Stadium
  Charlotte, North Carolina
- Game start: 7:45 p.m.
- Game attendance: 72,379
- TV announcers (ESPN/ESPN3D): Sean McDonough, Matt Millen, Heather Cox/Joe Tessitore, Tim Brown, Ray Bentley

=== Chick-Fil-A Bowl: South Carolina ===
Chick-Fil-A Bowl: Florida State vs. South Carolina

Team	1	2	3	4	Total
#19 South Carolina	0	3	7	7	17
• #23 Florida State	6	7	6	7	26

- Date: December 31
- Location: Georgia Dome
  Atlanta
- Game start: 7:30 p.m.
- Game attendance: 72,217
- TV announcers (ESPN/ESPN Radio): Ron Franklin, Ed Cunningham, Jeannine Edwards/Mark Neely, Rod Gilmore, Tom Luginbill

== Awards ==
=== Watchlists ===
- Dustin Hopkins
  Lou Groza Award semifinalist
- Rodney Hudson
  Lombardi Award semifinalist
  Outland Trophy finalist
- Brandon Jenkins
  Chuck Bednarik Award semifinalist
- Ryan McMahon
  Lombardi Award watchlist
  Outland Trophy watchlist
- Christian Ponder
  Maxwell Award watchlist
  Davey O'Brien Award watchlist
  William V. Campbell Trophy finalist
  Johnny Unitas Golden Arm Award finalist
- Bert Reed
  Fred Biletnikoff Award watchlist

=== Players ===
- Dustin Hopkins
  Academic All-America
  Academic All-ACC
- Rodney Hudson
  Unanimous Consensus All-American
  First-team All-ACC
- Brandon Jenkins
  First-team All-ACC
- E.J. Manuel
  Academic All-ACC
- Ryan McMahon
  Second-team All-ACC
- Christian Ponder
  Senior Bowl MVP
  James Tatum Award winner
  The National Bobby Bowden Award winner
  Academic All-American
  Academic All-ACC
- Xavier Rhodes
  FWAA Freshman All-American
  Rivals.com First-Team Freshman All-American
  ACC Defensive Rookie of the Year
  Second-team All-ACC
- Zebrie Sanders
  Academic All-ACC

== Post Season ==
=== NFL draft ===
Three seniors would go on and be drafted in the 2011 NFL draft.

Round	Pick	Overall	Name	Position	Team
1st	12	12	Christian Ponder	Quarterback	Minnesota Vikings
2nd	23	55	Rodney Hudson	Guard	Kansas City Chiefs
7th	21	224	Markus White	Defensive end	Washington Redskins

=== All-star games ===
Game	Date	Site	Players
62nd Senior Bowl	January 29, 2011	Ladd–Peebles Stadium, Mobile, Alabama	Christian Ponder, Rodney Hudson
