= 2010 Virginia Cavaliers football team =

American college football season

2010 Virginia Cavaliers football
- Conference: Atlantic Coast Conference
- Coastal
- Record: 4–8 (1–7 ACC)
- Head coach: Mike London (1st season)
- Offensive coordinator: Bill Lazor (1st season)
- Offensive scheme: Pro-style
- Defensive coordinator: Jim Reid (1st season)
- Base defense: 4–3
- Home stadium: Scott Stadium (Capacity: 61,500)

2010 Atlantic Coast Conference football standings
	Conf.			Overall
Team	W		L	W		L
Atlantic Division
No. 17 Florida State x	6	–	2	10	–	4
No. 23 Maryland	5	–	3	9	–	4
No. 25 NC State	5	–	3	9	–	4
Boston College	4	–	4	7	–	6
Clemson	4	–	4	6	–	7
Wake Forest	1	–	7	3	–	9
Coastal Division
No. 16 Virginia Tech x$	8	–	0	11	–	3
Miami (FL)	5	–	3	7	–	6
Georgia Tech	4	–	4	6	–	7
North Carolina	4	–	4	8	–	5
Duke	1	–	7	3	–	9
Virginia	1	–	7	4	–	8
Championship: Virginia Tech 44, Florida State 33
$ – BCS representative as conference champion; x – Division champion/co-champions; Rankings from AP Poll

The 2010 Virginia Cavaliers football team represented the University of Virginia in the 2010 NCAA Division I FBS football season as a member of the Coastal Division of the Atlantic Coast Conference (ACC). The Cavaliers, led by first year head coach Mike London, played their home games at Scott Stadium and are members of the Coastal Division of the Atlantic Coast Conference. They finished the season 4–8, 1–7 in ACC play.

== Schedule ==
Date	Time	Opponent	Site	TV	Result	Attendance
September 4	6:00 pm	Richmond*	Scott Stadium; Charlottesville, VA	ESPN3	W 34–13	54,146
September 11	10:30 pm	at No. 14 USC*	Los Angeles Memorial Coliseum; Los Angeles, CA	FSN	L 14–17	81,375
September 25	1:30 pm	VMI*	Scott Stadium; Charlottesville, VA	ESPN3	W 48–7	43,592
October 2	12:00 pm	No. 23 Florida State	Scott Stadium; Charlottesville, VA (Battle for the Jefferson-Eppes Trophy)	ACCN	L 14–34	47,096
October 9	3:30 pm	at Georgia Tech	Bobby Dodd Stadium; Atlanta, GA	ESPNU	L 21–33	48,016
October 16	6:00 pm	North Carolina^{†}	Scott Stadium; Charlottesville, VA (South's Oldest Rivalry)	ESPN3	L 10–44	50,830
October 23	6:00 pm	Eastern Michigan*	Scott Stadium; Charlottesville, VA	ESPN3	W 48–21	37,386
October 30	12:00 pm	No. 22 Miami (FL)	Scott Stadium; Charlottesville, VA	ESPN	W 24–19	39,328
November 6	12:00 pm	at Duke	Wallace Wade Stadium; Durham, NC	ESPN3	L 48–55	22,741
November 13	3:30 pm	Maryland	Scott Stadium; Charlottesville, VA (rivalry)	ESPN3	L 23–42	45,634
November 20	12:00 pm	at Boston College	Alumni Stadium; Chestnut Hill, MA	ESPNU	L 13–17	39,263
November 27	12:00 pm	at No. 14 Virginia Tech	Lane Stadium; Blacksburg, VA (Commonwealth Cup)	ACCN	L 7–37	66,233
*Non-conference game; ^{†}Homecoming; Rankings from Coaches' Poll released prior to the game; All times are in Eastern time

== Personnel ==
2010 Virginia Cavaliers football team roster
Players
Coaches
Offense

Pos.	#	Name	Class
TE		Jake McGee	Fr
QB		Marc Verica	Sr

Defense

Pos.	#	Name	Class

Special teams

Pos.	#	Name	Class

Head coach

- Mike London

Coordinators/assistant coaches

Legend

- (C) Team captain
- (S) Suspended
- (I) Ineligible
- Injured
- Redshirt
