= 2010 NCAA Division I FBS football season =

American college football season

2010 NCAA Division I FBS season
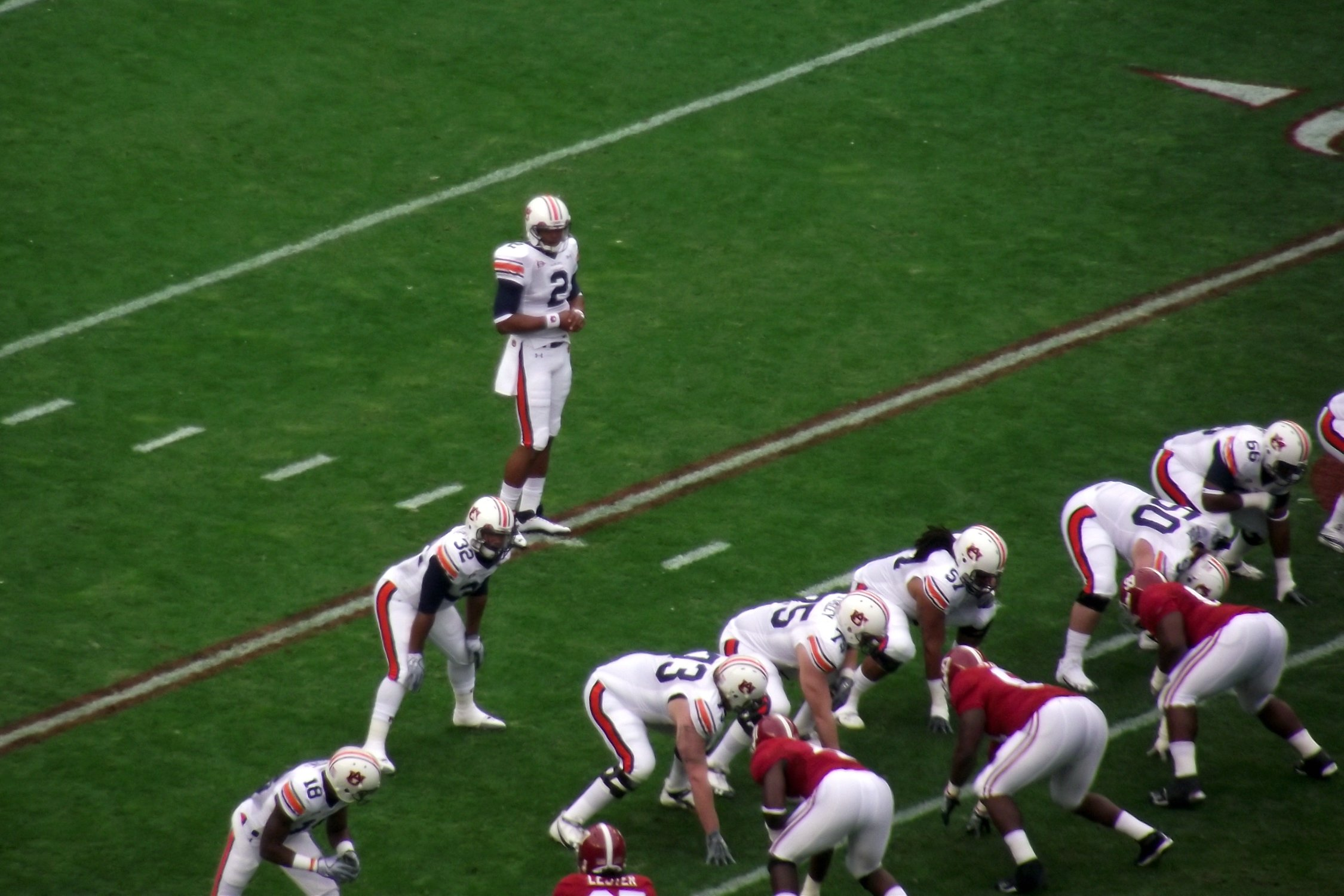
- Alabama v. Auburn
- Number of teams: 120
- Duration: September 2 – December 11
- Preseason AP No. 1: Alabama

Postseason
- Duration: December 18, 2010 – January 10, 2011
- Bowl games: 35
- Heisman Trophy: Cam Newton (quarterback, Auburn)

Bowl Championship Series
- 2011 BCS Championship Game
- Site: University of Phoenix Stadium Glendale, Arizona
- Champion(s): Auburn

NCAA Division I FBS football seasons
- ← 2009 2011 →

The 2010 NCAA Division I FBS football season was the highest level of college football competition in the United States organized by the National Collegiate Athletic Association (NCAA).

The regular season began on September 2, 2010, and ended on December 11, 2010. The postseason concluded on January 10, 2011, with the BCS National Championship Game at University of Phoenix Stadium in Glendale, Arizona. The Auburn Tigers defeated the Oregon Ducks to complete an undefeated season and win their sixth national title in school history.

== Rule changes ==
- Wedge blocks are now banned on kickoffs.
- Messages on eye-black, such as those worn by Tim Tebow, Reggie Bush, and Case Keenum are no longer allowed.

== Conference realignment ==
Multiple conferences announced changes in membership throughout 2010, triggering a major realignment that would eventually affect all 11 FBS leagues. Due to conference notice requirements, these changes would not take effect until 2011 at the earliest.

The first change came on June 10, when the Pacific-10 Conference announced that Colorado had accepted their invitation to join from the Big 12.

The following day, June 11, saw two schools change conferences. The Mountain West Conference announced that Boise State had accepted their invitation to join from the Western Athletic Conference (WAC), while Nebraska ended its longstanding affiliation with the Big Eight/Big 12 to join the Big Ten Conference. Both moves would take effect starting with the 2011–2012 academic year.

In the following days, it was widely speculated that the five public schools in the Big 12 South Division (Texas, Texas A&M, Texas Tech, Oklahoma, and Oklahoma State) would leave for the Pac-10 to create a 16-team "superconference." However, a last-minute deal announced on June 14 saw Texas remain in the Big 12, prompting the other four schools to follow suit. The Pac-10 then extended an invitation to Utah on June 16, who accepted the next day. With the addition of Colorado and Utah, the Pac-10 announced that the conference would change its name to the Pac-12 upon the two new members joining in July 2011.

On August 18, the Mountain West responded to rumors of the imminent departure of Brigham Young by inviting WAC members Fresno State, Nevada, and Utah State. Utah State declined the offer, but Fresno State and Nevada accepted later that day. Following threats of legal action by the WAC, the two schools agreed to stay in the WAC through the 2011–12 season in exchange for a greatly reduced exit fee. BYU officially announced their departure from the Mountain West on September 1. The BYU football team would become an FBS Independent while all other sports would move to the West Coast Conference for the 2011–12 season.

On November 11, the Western Athletic Conference announced that Texas State, then a member of the FCS Southland Conference, and UTSA, which planned to launch a football team in 2011, would upgrade their football programs to FBS level, join the WAC in 2012, and become full FBS members in 2013.

On November 29, TCU announced it would leave the Mountain West to join the Big East in 2012. The Mountain West replaced TCU by adding Hawaiʻi as a football-only member on December 10; Hawaiʻi's other sports would join the Big West Conference.

== New and updated stadiums ==
No new stadiums opened in the 2010 season. However, expansion projects at several stadiums were completed in time for the season:

- Alabama: The seventh major expansion of Bryant–Denny Stadium increased the capacity from 92,138 to 101,821.
- East Carolina: The east end zone at Dowdy–Ficklen Stadium was enclosed, increasing capacity from 43,000 to 50,000.
- Louisville: A second deck was added to the east side of Papa John's Cardinal Stadium, increasing capacity from its original 42,000 to over 56,000.
- Michigan: Michigan Stadium once again claimed the title of largest college football stadium. The new capacity was officially announced on July 14 as 109,901.
- Texas Tech: Renovations to Jones AT&T Stadium increased the capacity to 60,454 and a new building on the stadium's eastern side added an additional 26 suites and 500 club seats.

== Season notes ==
- USC was not eligible to be ranked in the USA Today Coaches Poll due to NCAA sanctions. They were also prohibited from playing in a bowl.
- On September 11, Virginia Tech, then No. 13 in the AP Poll, was stunned at home by in-state FCS team James Madison. The Dukes' 21–16 victory was only the second by an FCS school over a ranked FBS team, after Appalachian State's historic upset of Michigan in 2007.
- The University of Texas reached an agreement with ESPN to distribute the Longhorn Network on cable systems in the fall of 2011. The deal is for 10 years and guarantees Texas $12 million annually on top of the television revenue UT would receive as part of the Big 12's current television contracts with ABC/ESPN and Fox. The Longhorn Network would be the first sports-centric network for a university and was slated to broadcast third-tier programming, but UT men's athletic director DeLoss Dodds has asked the Big 12 to be allowed to air one football game, and a smattering of men's basketball games.ESPN, UT Reportedly Reach Deal To Distribute Longhorn Network
- The CBS telecast of the Iron Bowl between Alabama and Auburn on November 26, 2010, earned a 7.5 rating, the highest for any game of the 2010 college football season through week 13.

== Regular season top 10 matchups ==
Rankings reflect the AP Poll. Rankings for Week 8 and beyond will list BCS Rankings first and AP Poll second. Teams that failed to be a top 10 team for one poll or the other will be noted.

- Week 1
  - No. 3 Boise State defeated No. 10 Virginia Tech, 33–30 (FedEx Field, Landover, Maryland)
- Week 4
  - No. 1 Alabama defeated No. 10 Arkansas, 24–20 (Donald W. Reynolds Razorback Stadium, Fayetteville, Arkansas)
- Week 5
  - No. 1 Alabama defeated No. 7 Florida, 31–6 (Bryant–Denny Stadium, Tuscaloosa, Alabama)
  - No. 4 Oregon defeated No. 9 Stanford, 52–31 (Autzen Stadium, Eugene, Oregon)
- Week 8
  - No. 4/5 Auburn defeated No. 6/6 LSU, 24–17 (Jordan–Hare Stadium, Auburn, Alabama)
- Week 10
  - No. 3/4 TCU defeated No. 5/6 Utah, 47–7 (Rice–Eccles Stadium, Salt Lake City, Utah)
  - No. 10/12 LSU defeated No. 6/5 Alabama, 24–17 (Tiger Stadium, Baton Rouge, Louisiana)
- Week 13
  - No. 2/2 Auburn defeated No. 11/9 Alabama, 28–27 (Bryant–Denny Stadium, Tuscaloosa, Alabama)

== Conference standings ==
2010 Atlantic Coast Conference football standings
	Conf.			Overall
Team	W		L	W		L
Atlantic Division
No. 17 Florida State x	6	–	2	10	–	4
No. 23 Maryland	5	–	3	9	–	4
No. 25 NC State	5	–	3	9	–	4
Boston College	4	–	4	7	–	6
Clemson	4	–	4	6	–	7
Wake Forest	1	–	7	3	–	9
Coastal Division
No. 16 Virginia Tech x$	8	–	0	11	–	3
Miami (FL)	5	–	3	7	–	6
Georgia Tech	4	–	4	6	–	7
North Carolina	4	–	4	8	–	5
Duke	1	–	7	3	–	9
Virginia	1	–	7	4	–	8
Championship: Virginia Tech 44, Florida State 33
$ – BCS representative as conference champion; x – Division champion/co-champions; Rankings from AP Poll

2010 Big East Conference football standings
	Conf.			Overall
Team	W		L	W		L
Connecticut $+	5	–	2	8	–	5
West Virginia +	5	–	2	9	–	4
Pittsburgh +	5	–	2	8	–	5
Syracuse	4	–	3	8	–	5
South Florida	3	–	4	8	–	5
Louisville	3	–	4	7	–	6
Cincinnati	2	–	5	4	–	8
Rutgers	1	–	6	4	–	8
$ – BCS representative as conference champion; + – Conference co-champions; Rankings from AP Poll

2010 Big Ten Conference football standings
	Conf.			Overall
Team	W		L	W		L
No. 14 Michigan State +	7	–	1	11	–	2
No. 7 Wisconsin $+	7	–	1	11	–	2
Iowa	4	–	4	8	–	5
Illinois	4	–	4	7	–	6
Penn State	4	–	4	7	–	6
Michigan	3	–	5	7	–	6
Northwestern	3	–	5	7	–	6
Purdue	2	–	6	4	–	8
Minnesota	2	–	6	3	–	9
Indiana	1	–	7	5	–	7
No. 5 Ohio State† %	0	–	1	0	–	1
$ – BCS representative as conference champion; % – BCS at-large representative; + – Conference co-champions; † – Ohio State (12–1, 7–1) self-vacated all of their wins; Rankings from AP Poll

2010 Big 12 Conference football standings
	Conf.			Overall
Team	W		L	W		L
North Division
No. 20 Nebraska xy	6	–	2	10	–	4
No. 18 Missouri x	6	–	2	10	–	3
Kansas State	3	–	5	7	–	6
Iowa State	3	–	5	5	–	7
Colorado	2	–	6	5	–	7
Kansas	1	–	7	3	–	9
South Division
No. 6 Oklahoma xy$	6	–	2	12	–	2
No. 13 Oklahoma State x	6	–	2	11	–	2
No. 19 Texas A&M x	6	–	2	9	–	4
Baylor	4	–	4	7	–	6
Texas Tech	3	–	5	8	–	5
Texas	2	–	6	5	–	7
Championship: Oklahoma 23, Nebraska 20
$ – BCS representative as conference champion; x – Division champion/co-champions; y – Championship game participant; Rankings from AP Poll

2010 Conference USA football standings
	Conf.			Overall
Team	W		L	W		L
East Division
No. 21 UCF x$	7	–	1	11	–	3
East Carolina	5	–	3	6	–	7
Southern Miss	5	–	3	8	–	5
Marshall	4	–	4	5	–	7
UAB	3	–	5	4	–	8
Memphis	0	–	8	1	–	11
West Division
SMU xy	6	–	2	7	–	7
No. 24 Tulsa x	6	–	2	10	–	3
Houston	4	–	4	5	–	7
UTEP	3	–	5	6	–	7
Rice	3	–	5	4	–	8
Tulane	2	–	6	4	–	8
Championship: UCF 17, SMU 7
$ – Conference champion; x – Division champion/co-champions; y – Championship game participant; As of January 11, 2011; Rankings from AP Poll

2010 Mid-American Conference football standings
	Conf.			Overall
Team	W		L	W		L
East Division
Miami (OH) x$	7	–	1	10	–	4
Ohio	6	–	2	8	–	5
Temple	5	–	3	8	–	4
Kent State	4	–	4	5	–	7
Bowling Green	1	–	7	2	–	10
Buffalo	1	–	7	2	–	10
Akron	1	–	7	1	–	11
West Division
Northern Illinois x	8	–	0	11	–	3
Toledo	7	–	1	8	–	5
Western Michigan	5	–	3	6	–	6
Ball State	3	–	5	4	–	8
Central Michigan	2	–	6	3	–	9
Eastern Michigan	2	–	6	2	–	10
Championship: Miami 26, Northern Illinois 21
$ – Conference champion; x – Division champion/co-champions

2010 Mountain West Conference football standings
	Conf.			Overall
Team	W		L	W		L
No. 2 TCU $	8	–	0	13	–	0
Utah	7	–	1	10	–	3
Air Force	5	–	3	9	–	4
San Diego State	5	–	3	9	–	4
BYU	5	–	3	7	–	6
Colorado State	2	–	6	3	–	9
UNLV	2	–	6	2	–	11
Wyoming	1	–	7	3	–	9
New Mexico	1	–	7	1	–	11
$ – Conference champion and BCS representative as top non-AQ school to meet automatic qualification criteria; As of January 11, 2011; Rankings from AP Poll

2010 Pacific-10 Conference football standings
	Conf.			Overall
Team	W		L	W		L
No. 3 Oregon $	9	–	0	12	–	1
No. 4 Stanford %	8	–	1	12	–	1
USC †	5	–	4	8	–	5
Washington	5	–	4	7	–	6
Arizona	4	–	5	7	–	6
Arizona State	4	–	5	6	–	6
Oregon State	4	–	5	5	–	7
California	3	–	6	5	–	7
UCLA	2	–	7	4	–	8
Washington State	1	–	8	2	–	10
$ – BCS representative as conference champion; % – BCS at-large representative; † – USC ineligible for championship and post-season due to NCAA sanctions; Rankings from AP Poll

2010 Southeastern Conference football standings
	Conf.			Overall
Team	W		L	W		L
Eastern Division
No. 22 South Carolina x	5	–	3	9	–	5
Florida	4	–	4	8	–	5
Georgia	3	–	5	6	–	7
Tennessee	3	–	5	6	–	7
Kentucky	2	–	6	6	–	7
Vanderbilt	1	–	7	2	–	10
Western Division
No. 1 Auburn x$#	8	–	0	14	–	0
No. 12 Arkansas %	6	–	2	10	–	3
No. 8 LSU	6	–	2	11	–	2
No. 10 Alabama	5	–	3	10	–	3
No. 15 Mississippi State	4	–	4	9	–	4
Ole Miss*	1	–	7	4	–	8
Championship: Auburn 56, South Carolina 17
# – BCS National Champion; $ – BCS representative as conference champion; % – BCS at-large representative; x – Division champion/co-champions; * Ole Miss vacated all wins due to NCAA violations.; Rankings from AP Poll

2010 Sun Belt Conference football standings
	Conf.			Overall
Team	W		L	W		L
Troy +	6	–	2	8	–	5
FIU +	6	–	2	7	–	6
Middle Tennessee	5	–	3	6	–	7
Louisiana–Monroe	4	–	4	5	–	7
Arkansas State	4	–	4	4	–	8
Florida Atlantic	3	–	5	4	–	8
Louisiana–Lafayette	3	–	5	3	–	9
North Texas	3	–	5	3	–	9
Western Kentucky	2	–	6	2	–	10
+ – Conference co-champions

2010 Western Athletic Conference football standings
	Conf.			Overall
Team	W		L	W		L
No. 11 Nevada +	7	–	1	13	–	1
No. 9 Boise State +	7	–	1	12	–	1
Hawaii +	7	–	1	10	–	4
Fresno State	5	–	3	8	–	5
Louisiana Tech	4	–	4	5	–	7
Idaho	3	–	5	6	–	7
Utah State	2	–	6	4	–	8
New Mexico State	1	–	7	2	–	10
San Jose State	0	–	8	1	–	12
+ – Conference co-champions; Rankings from AP Poll

2010 NCAA Division I FBS independents football records
	Conf.			Overall
Team	W		L	W		L
Navy		–		9	–	4
Notre Dame		–		8	–	5
Army		–		7	–	6
Rankings from AP Poll

== Conference summaries ==
Rankings reflect the Week 14 AP Poll before the conference championship games were played.

=== Conference championship games ===
Conference	Champion	Runner-up	Score	Offensive Player of the Year	Defensive Player of the Year	Coach of the Year
ACC	No. 12 Virginia Tech	No. 20 Florida State	44–33	Tyrod Taylor, QB, Virginia Tech	Da'Quan Bowers, DE, Clemson	Ralph Friedgen, Maryland
Big 12	No. 10 Oklahoma	No. 13 Nebraska	23–20	Justin Blackmon, WR, Oklahoma State	Prince Amukamara, CB, Nebraska	Mike Gundy, Oklahoma State
C-USA	UCF	SMU	17–7	Dwayne Harris, WR/KR, East Carolina (MVP); G.J. Kinne, QB, Tulsa	Bruce Miller, DE, UCF	George O'Leary, UCF
MAC	Miami (OH)	No. 24 Northern Illinois	26–21	Chad Spann, RB, Northern Illinois	Roosevelt Nix, DT, Kent State	Mike Haywood, Miami
SEC	No. 2 Auburn	No. 18 South Carolina	56–17	Cam Newton, QB, Auburn	Patrick Peterson, CB, LSU	Steve Spurrier, South Carolina

=== Other conference champions ===
Conference	Champion	Record	Offensive Player of the Year	Defensive Player of the Year	Coach of the Year
Big East	Connecticut*; Pittsburgh #23 West Virginia	8–4 7–5 9–3	Jordan Todman, RB, Connecticut	Jabaal Sheard, DE, Pittsburgh	Randy Edsall, Connecticut and Charlie Strong, Louisville
Big Ten	No. 7 Michigan State; No. 6 Ohio State (vacated); No. 4 Wisconsin*	11–1 11–1 11–1	Denard Robinson, QB, Michigan	Ryan Kerrigan, DE, Purdue	Mark Dantonio, Michigan State
MWC	No. 3 TCU	12–0	Andy Dalton, QB, TCU	Tank Carder, LB, TCU	Brady Hoke, San Diego State
Pac-10	No. 1 Oregon	12–0	Andrew Luck, QB, Stanford	Stephen Paea, DT, Oregon State	Chip Kelly, Oregon
Sun Belt	FIU; Troy	6–6 7–5	T. Y. Hilton, WR/KR, FIU (Player of the Year); Bobby Rainey, RB, Western Kentucky (Offensive POY)	Jamari Lattimore, DE, Middle Tennessee	Mario Cristobal, FIU
WAC	No. 9 Boise State #25 Hawaiʻi #14 Nevada	11–1 10–3 12–1	Kellen Moore, QB, Boise State and Colin Kaepernick, QB, Nevada	Chris Carter, DE, Fresno State	Chris Ault, Nevada

* Received conference's automatic BCS bowl bid.

In 2011, Ohio State vacated all twelve wins and their share of the Big Ten title from the 2010 season after it was revealed that several players had committed NCAA violations by receiving improper benefits from a local business owner.

== Final BCS rankings ==
BCS	School	Record	BCS Bowl Game
1	Auburn	13–0	BCS National Championship
2	Oregon	12–0	BCS National Championship
3	TCU	12–0	Rose
4	Stanford	11–1	Orange
5	Wisconsin	11–1	Rose
6	Ohio State	11–1	Sugar
7	Oklahoma	11–2	Fiesta
8	Arkansas	10–2	Sugar
9	Michigan State	11–1	
10	Boise State	11–1	
11	LSU	10–2	
12	Missouri	10–2	
13	Virginia Tech	11–2	Orange
14	Oklahoma State	10–2	
15	Nevada	12–1	
16	Alabama	9–3	
17	Texas A&M	9–3	
18	Nebraska	10–3	
19	Utah	10–2	
20	South Carolina	9–4	
21	Mississippi State	8–4	
22	West Virginia	9–3	
23	Florida State	9–4	
24	Hawaiʻi	10–3	
25	UCF	10–3	

- Despite not being in the BCS rankings, Connecticut (8–4) played in the 2011 Fiesta Bowl by virtue of being the Big East Conference champion.

== FCS team wins over FBS teams ==
Italics denotes FCS teams.

Date	Visiting team	Home team	Site	Result	Attendance	Ref.
September 4	No. 17 (FCS) Jacksonville State	Ole Miss	Vaught–Hemingway Stadium • Oxford, Mississippi	49–48 ^{2OT}	55,768	
September 4	North Dakota State	Kansas	Memorial Stadium • Lawrence, Kansas	6–3	48,417	
September 11	No. 12 (FCS) James Madison	No. 13 (FBS) Virginia Tech	Lane Stadium • Blacksburg, Virginia	21–16	66,233	
September 11	Gardner–Webb	Akron	InfoCision Stadium • Akron, Ohio	38–37 ^{OT}	10,046	
September 11	No. 18 (FCS) Liberty	Ball State	Scheumann Stadium • Muncie, Indiana	27–23	9,110	
September 11	South Dakota	Minnesota	TCF Bank Stadium • Minneapolis, Minnesota	41–38	49,554	
October 2	UC Davis	San José State	Spartan Stadium • San Jose, California	14–13	17,844	
^{#}Rankings from AP Poll released prior to game.

== Bowl games ==
Non-BCS Bowls
Date	Game	Site	Television	Participants and Results
Dec. 18	New Mexico Bowl	University Stadium; University of New Mexico; Albuquerque, NM; 2:00 pm	ESPN	Brigham Young (6–6) 52; UTEP (6–6) 24
Dec. 18	uDrove Humanitarian Bowl	Bronco Stadium; Boise State University; Boise, ID; 5:30 pm	ESPN	Northern Illinois (10–3) 40; Fresno State (8–4) 17
Dec. 18	R+L Carriers New Orleans Bowl	Louisiana Superdome; New Orleans, LA; 9:00 pm	ESPN	Troy (7–5) 48; Ohio (8–4) 21
Dec. 21	Beef 'O' Brady's St. Petersburg Bowl	Tropicana Field; St. Petersburg, FL; 8:00 pm	ESPN	Southern Mississippi (8–4) 28; Louisville (6–6) 31
Dec. 22	Maaco Bowl Las Vegas	Sam Boyd Stadium; University of Nevada, Las Vegas; Whitney, NV; 8:00 pm	ESPN	No. 19 Utah (10–2) 3 No. 10 Boise State (11–1) 26
Dec. 23	SDCCU Poinsettia Bowl	Qualcomm Stadium; San Diego, CA; 8:00 pm	ESPN	Navy (9–3) 14; San Diego State (8–4) 35
Dec. 24	Sheraton Hawaiʻi Bowl	Aloha Stadium; Honolulu, HI; 8:00 pm	ESPN	No. 24 Hawaiʻi (10–3) 35; Tulsa (9–3) 62
Dec. 26	Little Caesars Pizza Bowl	Ford Field; Detroit, MI; 8:30 pm	ESPN	Florida International (6–6) 34; Toledo (8–4) 32
Dec. 27	AdvoCare V100 Independence Bowl	Independence Stadium; Shreveport, LA; 5:00 pm	ESPN2	Air Force (8–4) 14; Georgia Tech (6–6) 7
Dec. 28	Champs Sports Bowl	Citrus Bowl; Orlando, FL; 6:30 pm	ESPN	No. 22 West Virginia (9–3) 7 North Carolina State (9–3) 23
Dec. 28	Insight Bowl	Sun Devil Stadium; Arizona State University; Tempe, AZ; 10:00 pm	ESPN	No. 12 Missouri (10–2) 24; Iowa (7–5) 27
Dec. 29	Military Bowl Pres. By Northrop Grumman	RFK Stadium; Washington D.C. 2:30 pm	ESPN	East Carolina (6–6) 20; Maryland (8–4) 51
Dec. 29	Texas Bowl	Reliant Stadium; Houston, TX; 6:00 pm	ESPN	Illinois (6–6) 38; Baylor (7–5) 14
Dec. 29	Valero Alamo Bowl	Alamodome; San Antonio, TX; 9:15 pm	ESPN	No. 14 Oklahoma State (10–2) 36; Arizona (7–5) 10
Dec. 30	Bell Helicopter Armed Forces Bowl	Gerald J. Ford Stadium; Southern Methodist University; University Park, TX; 12:00 pm	ESPN	Army (6–6) 16; Southern Methodist (7–6) 14
Dec. 30	New Era Pinstripe Bowl	Yankee Stadium; The Bronx, New York, NY; 3:20 pm	ESPN	Kansas State (7–5) 34; Syracuse (7–5) 36
Dec. 30	Franklin American Mortgage Music City Bowl	LP Field; Nashville, TN; 6:40 pm	ESPN	North Carolina (7–5) 30; Tennessee (6–6) 27 (2OT)
Dec. 30	Bridgepoint Education Holiday Bowl	Qualcomm Stadium; San Diego, CA; 10:00 pm	ESPN	No. 18 Nebraska (10–3) 7 Washington (6–6) 19
Dec. 31	Meineke Car Care Bowl	Bank of America Stadium; Charlotte, NC; 12:00 pm	ESPN	South Florida (7–5) 31; Clemson (6–6) 26
Dec. 31	Hyundai Sun Bowl	Sun Bowl Stadium; University of Texas El Paso; El Paso, TX; 2:00 pm	CBS	Notre Dame (7–5) 33; Miami (FL) (7–5) 17
Dec. 31	AutoZone Liberty Bowl	Liberty Bowl; Memphis, TN; 3:30 pm	ESPN	Georgia (6–6) 6 No. 25 Central Florida (10–3) 10
Dec. 31	Chick-fil-A Bowl	Georgia Dome; Atlanta, GA; 7:30 pm	ESPN	No. 20 South Carolina (9–4) 17; No. 23 Florida State (9–4) 26
Jan. 1	TicketCity Bowl	Cotton Bowl; Fair Park, Dallas, TX; 12:00 pm	ESPNU	Northwestern (7–5) 38; Texas Tech (7–5) 45
Jan. 1	Outback Bowl	Raymond James Stadium; Tampa, FL; 1:00 pm	ABC	Florida (8–4) 37; Penn State (7–5) 24
Jan. 1	Capital One Bowl	Citrus Bowl; Orlando, FL; 1:00 pm	ESPN	No. 16 Alabama (9–3) 49; No. 9 Michigan State (11–1) 7
Jan. 1	Progressive Gator Bowl	EverBank Field; Jacksonville, FL; 1:30 pm	ESPN2	No. 21 Mississippi State (8–4) 52; Michigan (7–5) 14
Jan. 6	GoDaddy.com Bowl	Ladd–Peebles Stadium; Mobile, AL; 8:00 pm	ESPN	Middle Tennessee (6–6) 21; Miami (OH) (9–4) 35
Jan. 7	AT&T Cotton Bowl	Cowboys Stadium; Arlington, TX; 8:00 pm	Fox	No. 11 LSU (10–2) 41; No. 17 Texas A&M (9–3) 24
Jan. 8	BBVA Compass Bowl	Legion Field; Birmingham, AL; 12:00 pm	ESPN	Pittsburgh (7–5) 27; Kentucky (6–6) 10
Jan. 9	Kraft Fight Hunger Bowl	AT&T Park; San Francisco, CA; 9:00 pm	ESPN	No. 15 Nevada (12–1) 20; Boston College (7–5) 13
Bowl Championship Series
Date	Game	Site	Television	Participants and Results
Jan. 1	Rose Bowl Game presented by Vizio	Rose Bowl; Pasadena, CA; 4:30 pm	ESPN	No. 5 Wisconsin (11–1) 19; No. 3 TCU (12–0) 21
Jan. 1	Tostitos Fiesta Bowl	University of Phoenix Stadium; Glendale, AZ; 8:30 pm	ESPN	Connecticut (8–4) 20; No. 7 Oklahoma (11–2) 48
Jan. 3	Discover Orange Bowl	Sun Life Stadium; Miami Gardens, FL; 8:30 pm	ESPN	No. 4 Stanford (11–1) 40; No. 13 Virginia Tech (11–2) 12
Jan. 4	Allstate Sugar Bowl	Louisiana Superdome; New Orleans, LA; 8:30 pm	ESPN	No. 6 Ohio State (11–1) 31; No. 8 Arkansas (10–2) 26
Jan. 10	Tostitos BCS National Championship Game	University of Phoenix Stadium; Glendale, AZ; 8:30 pm	ESPN	No. 2 Oregon (12–0) 19; No. 1 Auburn (13–0) 22

== Awards and honors ==
=== Heisman Trophy voting ===
The Heisman Trophy is given to the year's most outstanding player

Player	School	Position	1st	2nd	3rd	Total
Cam Newton	Auburn	QB	729	24	28	2,263
Andrew Luck	Stanford	QB	78	309	227	1,079
LaMichael James	Oregon	RB	22	313	224	916
Kellen Moore	Boise State	QB	40	165	185	635
Justin Blackmon	Oklahoma State	WR	1	23	56	105
Denard Robinson	Michigan	QB	6	16	34	84
Ryan Mallett	Arkansas	QB	0	11	19	41
Colin Kaepernick	Nevada	QB	0	7	17	31
Andy Dalton	TCU	QB	4	3	12	30
Owen Marecic	Stanford	FB/LB	3	1	5	16

=== Other award winners ===
==== Overall ====
- AP Player of the Year: Cameron Newton, Auburn
- Maxwell Award (top player): Cameron Newton, Auburn
- Walter Camp Award (top player): Cameron Newton, Auburn

Niche

- Campbell Trophy ("academic Heisman", formerly the Draddy Trophy): Sam Acho, Texas
- Wuerffel Trophy (humanitarian-athlete): Sam Acho, Texas
- Paul Hornung Award (most versatile player): Owen Marecic, Stanford
- Burlsworth Trophy (top player who began as walk-on): Sean Bedford, Georgia Tech

==== Offense ====
Quarterback

- Davey O'Brien Award (quarterback): Cameron Newton, Auburn
- Johnny Unitas Award (senior quarterback): Scott Tolzien, Wisconsin
- Manning Award (quarterback): Cameron Newton, Auburn
- Sammy Baugh Trophy (quarterback, specifically passer): Landry Jones, Oklahoma

Running Back

- Doak Walker Award (running back): LaMichael James, Oregon

Wide Receiver

- Fred Biletnikoff Award (wide receiver): Justin Blackmon, Oklahoma State

Tight End

- John Mackey Award (tight end): D.J. Williams, Arkansas

Lineman

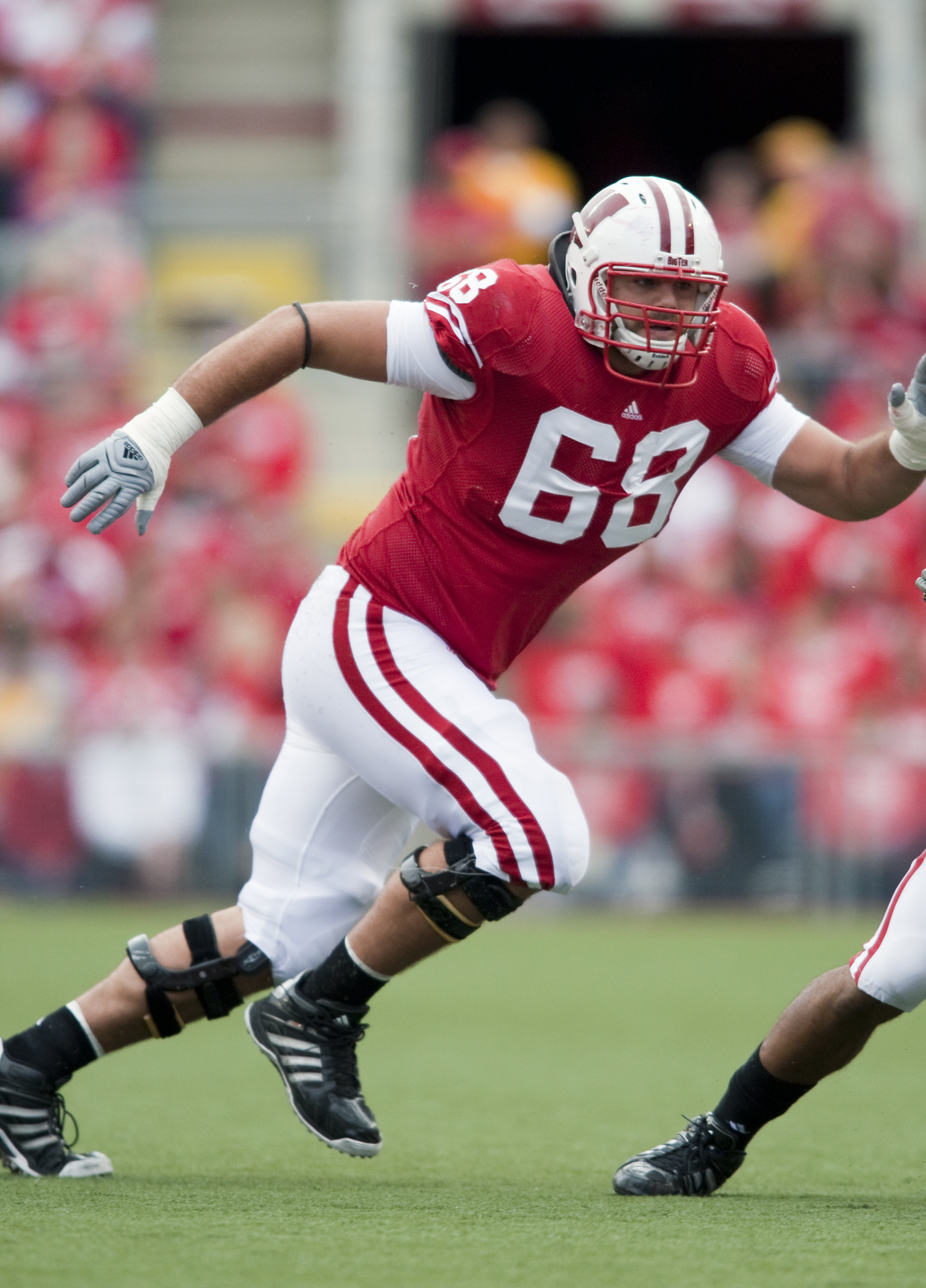
Gabe Carimi

- Dave Rimington Trophy (center): Jake Kirkpatrick, TCU
- Outland Trophy (interior lineman): Gabe Carimi, Wisconsin

==== Defense ====
- Bronko Nagurski Trophy (defensive player): Da'Quan Bowers, Clemson
- Chuck Bednarik Award (defensive player): Patrick Peterson, LSU
- Lott Trophy (defensive impact): J. J. Watt, Wisconsin

Defensive Line

- Ted Hendricks Award (defensive end): Da'Quan Bowers, Clemson
- Lombardi Award (defensive lineman): Nick Fairley, Auburn

Linebacker

- Dick Butkus Award (linebacker): Von Miller, Texas A&M

Defensive Back

- Jim Thorpe Award (defensive back): Patrick Peterson, LSU

==== Special teams ====
- Lou Groza Award (placekicker): Dan Bailey, Oklahoma State
- Ray Guy Award (punter): Chas Henry, Florida

==== Coaches ====
- AP Coach of the Year: Chip Kelly, Oregon
- Paul "Bear" Bryant Award: Gene Chizik, Auburn
- The Home Depot Coach of the Year Award: Gene Chizik, Auburn
- Walter Camp Coach of the Year: Chip Kelly, Oregon
- Eddie Robinson Coach of the Year: Chip Kelly, Oregon
- Bobby Dodd Coach of the Year Award: Chris Petersen, Boise State
- Bobby Bowden National Collegiate Coach of the Year Award: Gene Chizik, Auburn

Assistant

- Broyles Award (assistant coach): Gus Malzahn, Auburn

== Records ==
- Penn State football coach, Joe Paterno, in his 45th season, has achieved a feat that no coach in major college football history has ever reached: the 400-win mark. Paterno already held records for the most wins in major college football history as well as the most bowl wins (24) in college football history.
- Kyle Brotzman of Boise State set a new Division I record for most career points by a kicker. His 439 career points surpassed the former record of 433 by Art Carmody of Louisville.
- Miami (Ohio) became the first team in FBS history to win 10 or more games after losing 10 or more games in the previous season.

== Coaching changes ==
=== Preseason and in-season ===
This is restricted to coaching changes that took place on or after May 1, 2010. For coaching changes that occurred earlier in 2010, see 2009 NCAA Division I FBS end-of-season coaching changes.

Team	Outgoing coach	Date	Reason	Replacement
Vanderbilt	Bobby Johnson	July 14	Retired	Robbie Caldwell
Minnesota	Tim Brewster	October 17	Fired after 1–6 start	Jeff Horton (interim)
North Texas	Todd Dodge	October 20	Fired after 1–6 start	Mike Canales (interim)
Colorado	Dan Hawkins	November 9	Fired after 3–6 start	Brian Cabral (interim)

=== End of season ===
Note:

- All dates in November and December are in 2010; all January dates are in 2011.
- The "resigned/fired" listing indicates that a coach technically resigned, but at least one media report has stated that he was effectively fired.

Team	Outgoing coach	Date of departure	Reason	Replacement	Date of replacement
Kent State	Doug Martin	November 21 (effective November 27)	Resigned	Darrell Hazell	December 20
Ball State	Stan Parrish	November 22	Fired	Pete Lembo	December 20
Vanderbilt	Robbie Caldwell	November 27	Resigned	James Franklin	December 17
Miami (FL)	Randy Shannon	November 27	Fired	Al Golden	December 12
Indiana	Bill Lynch	November 28	Fired	Kevin Wilson	December 7
Arkansas State	Steve Roberts	November 29	Resigned/fired	Hugh Freeze	December 2
Louisiana-Lafayette	Rickey Bustle	November 29	Fired	Mark Hudspeth	December 13
North Texas	Mike Canales (interim)	November 30	Permanent replacement	Dan McCarney	November 30
Minnesota	Jeff Horton (interim)	December 5	Permanent replacement	Jerry Kill	December 5
Northern Illinois	Jerry Kill	December 5	Hired by Minnesota	Tom Matukewicz (interim)	December 9
Northern Illinois	Jerry Kill	December 5	Hired by Minnesota	Dave Doeren (permanent)	December 13 (effective January 2)
Colorado	Brian Cabral (interim)	December 6	Permanent replacement	Jon Embree	December 6
Florida	Urban Meyer	December 8 (effective January 2)	Resigned	Will Muschamp	December 11 (effective January 2)
Pittsburgh	Dave Wannstedt	December 7	Resigned/fired	Mike Haywood	December 16 (fired on Jan. 1)
Temple	Al Golden	December 12	Hired by Miami (FL)	Steve Addazio	December 22 (effective date TBA)
Miami (OH)	Mike Haywood	December 16	Hired by Pittsburgh	Lance Guidry (interim)	December 16
Miami (OH)	Mike Haywood	December 16	Hired by Pittsburgh	Don Treadwell (permanent)	December 31 (effective January 10)
Maryland	Ralph Friedgen	December 20	Fired	Randy Edsall	January 2
Pittsburgh	Mike Haywood	January 1	Fired	Phil Bennett (interim)	January 3
Pittsburgh	Mike Haywood	January 1	Fired	Todd Graham (permanent)	January 10
Connecticut	Randy Edsall	January 2	Hired by Maryland	Paul Pasqualoni	January 13
Michigan	Rich Rodriguez	January 5	Fired	Brady Hoke	January 11
Stanford	Jim Harbaugh	January 7	Hired by San Francisco 49ers	David Shaw	January 13
Tulsa	Todd Graham	January 10	Hired by Pittsburgh	Bill Blankenship	January 14
San Diego State	Brady Hoke	January 11	Hired by Michigan	Rocky Long	January 12

== TV ratings ==
=== Ten most watched regular season games in 2010 ===
1. November 26 - Iron Bowl/The Cam-Back - CBS - 2 Auburn vs 9 Alabama - 12.5 Million viewers
2. December 4 - 2010 SEC Championship - CBS - 1 Auburn vs 19 South Carolina - 10.1 Million viewers
3. September 6 - ESPN - 3 Boise State vs. 5 Virginia Tech - 9.9 Million viewers
4. December 4 - 2010 Big 12 Championship - ESPN on ABC - 13 Nebraska vs 10 Oklahoma - 8.98 Million viewers
5. October 2 - CBS - 7 Florida vs 1 Alabama - 8.6 Million viewers
6. November 13 - Deep South's Oldest Rivalry - CBS - Georgia vs 2 Auburn - 8.3 Million viewers
7. September 25 - CBS - 1 Alabama vs 10 Arkansas - 8.2 Million viewers
8. November 26 - ESPN - 21 Arizona vs 1 Oregon - 7.8 Million viewers
9. October 9 - CBS - 1 Alabama vs 19 South Carolina - 7.7 Million viewers
10. September 11 - ESPN - 18 Penn State vs 1 Alabama -7.2 Million viewers

7 of 10 games involved with SEC teams - All seven involved a team from the State of Alabama

== Attendances ==
#	Team	Games	Total	Average
1	Michigan	7	782,776	111,825
2	Ohio State	8	842,221	105,278
3	Penn State	7	729,636	104,234
4	Alabama	7	712,747	101,821
5	Texas	7	704,580	100,654
6	Tennessee	7	698,465	99,781
7	Georgia	6	556,476	92,746
8	LSU	7	649,023	92,718
9	Florida	7	633,579	90,511
10	Auburn	8	688,692	86,087
11	Nebraska	7	599,648	85,664
12	Oklahoma	6	508,426	84,738
13	Texas A&M	7	577,338	82,477
14	Notre Dame	7	565,565	80,795
15	Southern California	6	479,444	79,907
16	Wisconsin	7	559,035	79,862
17	Clemson	7	542,280	77,469
18	South Carolina	7	536,675	76,668
19	Michigan State	7	514,894	73,556
20	Florida State	7	498,890	71,270
21	Iowa	7	494,095	70,585
22	Arkansas	6	413,591	68,932
23	Washington	6	397,581	66,264
24	Virginia Tech	7	463,631	66,233
25	Kentucky	7	462,488	66,070
26	Missouri	6	369,240	61,540
27	BYU	6	368,283	61,381
28	UCLA	6	362,253	60,376
29	Oregon	6	356,387	59,398
30	North Carolina	6	349,500	58,250
31	California	7	405,112	57,873
32	Texas Tech	6	342,647	57,108
33	North Carolina State	6	341,261	56,877
34	West Virginia	7	394,274	56,325
35	Mississippi	7	391,289	55,898
36	Arizona	7	387,857	55,408
37	Mississippi State	7	384,995	54,999
38	Illinois	6	325,126	54,188
39	Miami Hurricanes	6	315,452	52,575
40	Pittsburgh	6	312,991	52,165
41	Oklahoma State	7	355,684	50,812
42	Louisville	7	354,537	50,648
43	Kansas State	6	298,897	49,816
44	East Carolina	6	297,987	49,665
45	Minnesota	7	346,593	49,513
46	Purdue	7	336,443	48,063
47	Arizona State	6	287,657	47,943
48	Colorado	6	281,182	46,864
49	Georgia Tech	6	278,696	46,449
50	Rutgers	7	323,368	46,195
51	Oregon State	6	273,054	45,509
52	Utah	6	272,754	45,459
53	Virginia	7	318,212	45,459
54	Iowa State	7	317,767	45,395
55	Kansas	7	313,955	44,851
56	TCU	6	254,797	42,466
57	Indiana	6	251,718	41,953
58	South Florida	7	285,946	40,849
59	Air Force	6	240,560	40,093
60	Syracuse	6	240,385	40,064
61	Baylor	6	240,259	40,043
62	Stanford	6	240,254	40,042
63	UCF	7	277,301	39,614
64	Maryland	6	235,007	39,168
65	Boston College	7	268,585	38,369
66	Connecticut	6	229,488	38,248
67	Hawaii	8	298,486	37,311
68	Northwestern	6	218,696	36,449
69	Cincinnati	7	245,472	35,067
70	San Diego State	7	238,930	34,133
71	Fresno State	7	238,841	34,120
72	Boise State	6	199,611	33,269
73	Vanderbilt	7	232,885	33,269
74	Navy	5	163,266	32,653
75	Houston	6	190,366	31,728
76	Army	5	158,334	31,667
77	Wake Forest	6	182,843	30,474
78	Southern Miss	6	176,400	29,400
79	UTEP	6	176,097	29,350
80	Duke	7	201,248	28,750
81	Marshall	6	162,276	27,046
82	Rice	7	178,994	25,571
83	Washington State	6	147,194	24,532
84	Memphis	6	143,509	23,918
85	SMU	7	164,602	23,515
86	Tulane	7	162,543	23,220
87	Colorado State	5	111,998	22,400
88	Louisiana-Monroe	6	125,603	20,934
89	New Mexico	6	125,330	20,888
90	Wyoming	6	124,747	20,791
91	UNLV	6	123,672	20,612
92	Temple	6	123,088	20,515
93	Central Michigan	5	102,238	20,448
94	Tulsa	6	122,272	20,379
95	FIU	6	118,848	19,808
96	Nevada	7	137,032	19,576
97	Louisiana Tech	6	116,908	19,485
98	Toledo	6	116,000	19,333
99	Ohio	6	114,277	19,046
100	Middle Tennessee	6	114,143	19,024
101	Troy	5	94,736	18,947
102	UAB	6	110,162	18,360
103	Utah State	6	107,265	17,878
104	Northern Illinois	5	88,801	17,760
105	North Texas	6	106,306	17,718
106	Arkansas State	5	86,969	17,394
107	Louisiana-Lafayette	5	86,915	17,383
108	Kent State	6	96,911	16,152
109	New Mexico State	6	95,433	15,906
110	Eastern Michigan	5	79,426	15,885
111	Miami RedHawks	5	77,593	15,519
112	Western Kentucky	5	72,884	14,577
113	San Jose State	6	86,842	14,474
114	Western Michigan	6	85,528	14,255
115	FAU	4	56,098	14,025
116	Bowling Green	5	66,532	13,306
117	Buffalo	6	77,883	12,981
118	Idaho	6	76,379	12,730
119	Akron	6	61,108	10,185
120	Ball State	6	53,683	8,947
