= Paul Hornung Award =

American college football award

- Awarded for: The collegiate American football player adjudged to be the most versatile of all NCAA players
- Location: Louisville, Kentucky
- Country: United States
- Presented by: Louisville Sports Commission

History
- First award: 2010
- Most recent: Texas A&M wide receiver KC Concepcion
- Website: louisvillesports.org/paul-hornung/

The Paul Hornung Award is a college football award that was created in January 2010 by the Louisville Sports Commission in Louisville, Kentucky, with the support of Paul Hornung, a member of the College Football Hall of Fame and the Pro Football Hall of Fame. The mission of the award is to recognize and reward versatile, high-level performers in major college football; to help preserve the legacy of Hornung, one of Louisville's native sons and sports icons; and to promote Louisville as a great sports town.

== Eligibility criteria ==
To be eligible, a candidate must be in good standing and eligible on his team during the selection process, eligible with the NCAA during the selection process and play significant time during most or all of the season. Decisions regarding status for the award will be made by the Oversight Committee. In addition to starting or playing significant downs on offense or defense, candidates will be measured by performance from among one or more of the following:

- Playing multiple positions on offense and/or multiple positions on defense
- Playing a significant role on special teams
- Performing as a two-way player who starts either on offense or defense and is used on the other side of the ball in some capacity
- Making a significant impact during big games and elevating the team's performance through leadership displayed by excelling in multiple roles

== Winners ==
Year	Player	Positions	School	Ref.
2010	Owen Marecic	FB, LB	Stanford	
2011	Brandon Boykin	WR, CB, RS	Georgia	
2012	Tavon Austin	WR, RB, RS	West Virginia	
2013	Odell Beckham Jr.	WR, RS	LSU	
2014	Shaq Thompson	RB, LB, S	Washington	
2015	Christian McCaffrey	RB, RS	Stanford	
2016	Jabrill Peppers	QB, WR, RB, LB, DB, RS	Michigan	
2017	Saquon Barkley	RB, RS	Penn State	
2018	Rondale Moore	WR, RS	Purdue	
2019	Lynn Bowden	QB, WR, RS	Kentucky	
2020	DeVonta Smith	WR, RS	Alabama	
2021	Marcus Jones	CB, WR, RS	Houston	
2022	Jack Colletto	QB, FB, LB, ST	Oregon State	
2023	Travis Hunter	WR, CB	Colorado	
2024	Travis Hunter (2)	WR, CB	Colorado	
2025	KC Concepcion	WR, RS	Texas A&M	
