= 2010 Virginia Tech Hokies football team =

American college football season

2010 Virginia Tech Hokies football

ACC champion ACC Coastal Division champion

ACC Championship, W 44–33 vs. Florida State

Orange Bowl, L 12–40 vs. Stanford
- Conference: Atlantic Coast Conference
- Coastal Division

Ranking
- Coaches: No. 15
- AP: No. 16
- Record: 11–3 (8–0 ACC)
- Head coach: Frank Beamer (24th season)
- Offensive coordinator: Bryan Stinespring (9th season)
- Offensive scheme: Pro-style
- Defensive coordinator: Bud Foster (16th season)
- Base defense: 4–4
- Home stadium: Lane Stadium

Uniform

2010 Atlantic Coast Conference football standings
	Conf.			Overall
Team	W		L	W		L
Atlantic Division
No. 17 Florida State x	6	–	2	10	–	4
No. 23 Maryland	5	–	3	9	–	4
No. 25 NC State	5	–	3	9	–	4
Boston College	4	–	4	7	–	6
Clemson	4	–	4	6	–	7
Wake Forest	1	–	7	3	–	9
Coastal Division
No. 16 Virginia Tech x$	8	–	0	11	–	3
Miami (FL)	5	–	3	7	–	6
Georgia Tech	4	–	4	6	–	7
North Carolina	4	–	4	8	–	5
Duke	1	–	7	3	–	9
Virginia	1	–	7	4	–	8
Championship: Virginia Tech 44, Florida State 33
$ – BCS representative as conference champion; x – Division champion/co-champions; Rankings from AP Poll

The 2010 Virginia Tech Hokies football team represented Virginia Polytechnic Institute and State University in the 2010 NCAA Division I FBS college football season. The Hokies were led by 24th-year head coach Frank Beamer and played their home games at Lane Stadium. They were champions of the Atlantic Coast Conference after winning the Coastal Division and defeating Florida State 44–33 in the 2010 ACC Championship Game.

The 2010 Hokies were only the second-ever team ranked in the AP Poll to lose to a FCS opponent (James Madison). (The other ranked team to lose to a FCS team is #5 Michigan in 2007 to Appalachian State.) The loss was the team's second in six days, as it also lost to then #3 ranked Boise State at FedExField in Landover, MD in a nationally televised Monday night contest.

After the JMU loss, Tech reeled off ten straight wins and became the first team to go undefeated in ACC play since Florida State in 2000. It finished its regular season with a 10–2 record and now holds the longest streak of ten-win seasons in the NCAA with seven. Tech played Stanford in the Discover Orange Bowl after they beat Florida State 44–33 in the 2010 ACC Championship Game. They lost to Stanford by a score of 40–12.

== Schedule ==
Date	Time	Opponent	Rank	Site	TV	Result	Attendance	Source
September 6	8:00 p.m.	vs. No. 3 Boise State*	No. 10	FedExField; Landover, MD (Allstate Kickoff in the Capital)	ESPN	L 30–33	86,587	
September 11	1:30 p.m.	No. 12 (FCS) James Madison*	No. 13	Lane Stadium; Blacksburg, VA	ESPN3	L 16–21	66,233	
September 18	1:30 p.m.	East Carolina*		Lane Stadium; Blacksburg, VA	ESPN3	W 49–27	66,233	
September 25	12:00 p.m.	at Boston College		Alumni Stadium; Chestnut Hill, MA (rivalry)	ACCN	W 19–0	42,317	
October 2	3:30 p.m.	at No. 23 NC State		Carter–Finley Stadium; Raleigh, NC	ABC	W 41–30	58,083	
October 9	12:00 p.m.	Central Michigan*		Lane Stadium; Blacksburg, VA	ESPNU	W 45–21	66,233	
October 16	3:30 p.m.	Wake Forest^{†}		Lane Stadium; Blacksburg, VA	ESPNU	W 52–21	66,233	
October 23	12:00 p.m.	Duke	No. 23	Lane Stadium; Blacksburg, VA	ACCN	W 44–7	66,233	
November 4	7:30 p.m.	Georgia Tech	No. 20	Lane Stadium; Blacksburg, VA (Battle of the Techs)	ESPN	W 28–21	66,233	
November 13	3:30 p.m.	at North Carolina	No. 16	Kenan Memorial Stadium; Chapel Hill, NC	ABC/ESPN	W 26–10	60,000	
November 20	3:30 p.m.	at No. 24 Miami (FL)	No. 14	Sun Life Stadium; Miami Gardens, FL (rivalry)	ESPN	W 31–17	40,101	
November 27	12:00 p.m.	Virginia	No. 13	Lane Stadium; Blacksburg, VA (rivalry)	ACCN	W 37–7	66,233	
December 4	7:45 p.m.	vs. No. 20 Florida State	No. 12	Bank of America Stadium; Charlotte, NC (ACC Championship Game)	ESPN	W 44–33	72,379	
January 3, 2011	8:30 p.m.	vs. No. 5 Stanford*	No. 12	Sun Life Stadium; Miami Gardens, FL (Orange Bowl, College GameDay)	ESPN	L 12–40	65,453	
*Non-conference game; ^{†}Homecoming; Rankings from AP Poll released prior to the game; All times are in Eastern time

== Rankings ==
Ranking movements Legend: ██ Increase in ranking ██ Decrease in ranking — = Not ranked RV = Received votes
	Week															
Poll	Pre	1	2	3	4	5	6	7	8	9	10	11	12	13	14	Final
AP	10	13	—	—	—	RV	RV	23	21	20	16	14	13	12	12	16
Coaches	6	13	RV	RV	RV	RV	RV	23	21	20	17	15	14	11	11	15
Harris	Not released						RV	23	21	20	17	15	14	12	12	Not released
BCS	Not released							25	23	22	20	16	16	15	13	Not released

== Roster ==
2010 Virginia Tech Hokies roster
Flanker: Ben Barber – (redshirt) Freshman; Willie Byrn – Freshman; 7 Marcus Davis – (redshirt) Sophomore; 11 Dyrell Roberts – Junior; 19 Danny Coale – (redshirt) Junior; 35 Austin Fuller – (redshirt) Sophomore; Split End: Corey Fuller – Junior; E.L. Smiling – Freshman; 18 D.J. Coles – Sophomore; 29 Xavier Boyce – (redshirt) Sophomore; 81 Jarrett Boykin – Junior; Center: 60 Beau Warren – (redshirt) Senior; 63 Bo Gentry – (redshirt) Sophomore; 67 Michael Via – (redshirt) Sophomore; 74 Andrew Miller – (redshirt) Freshman; Offensive Guard: Matt Arkema – Freshman; Tyler Barfield – (redshirt) Freshman; 59 Courtney Prince – (redshirt) Sophomore; 68 Jaymes Brooks – (redshirt) Junior; 71 Vinston Painter – (redshirt) Sophomore; 75 Greg Nosal – (redshirt) Junior; 76 David Wang – (redshirt) Freshman; 77 Dale Davis – Freshman; Offensive Tackle: Mark Shuman – Freshman; 54 Nick Becton – (redshirt) Sophomore; 61 Darian Fisher – (redshirt) Freshman; 62 Blake DeChristopher – (redshirt) Junior; 63 Laurence Gibson – Freshman; 70 Kory Gough – Freshman; 72 Andrew Lanier – (redshirt) Junior; Tight End: Derek DiNardo – Freshman; Jerome Lewis – Freshman; 13 Randall Dunn – (redshirt) Sophomore; 85 Rob Stanton – (redshirt) Senior; 86 Eric Martin – (redshirt) Freshman; 87 Prince Parker – (redshirt) Senior; 88 Andre Smith – (redshirt) Senior; 89 Jay Cockrill – Sophomore; 95 George George – (redshirt) Sophomore	Quarterback: Mark Leal – Freshman; Ricardo Young – Freshman; 3 Logan Thomas – (redshirt) Freshman; 5 Tyrod Taylor – Senior; 12 Joseph Clayton – (redshirt) Sophomore; 14 Trey Gresh – Freshman; Tailback: 4 David Wilson – Sophomore; 22 Tony Gregory – (redshirt) Freshman; 32 Darren Evans – (redshirt) Junior; 34 Ryan Williams – (redshirt) Sophomore; Fullback: Josh Call – (redshirt) Sophomore; Bradley Tallman – Freshman; 25 Josh Oglesby – (redshirt) Junior; 31 Kenny Younger – (redshirt) Senior; 39 Martin Scales – (redshirt) Sophomore; 45 Joey Phillips – (redshirt) Sophomore; Defensive tackle: Nick Acree – Freshman; 53 Dwight Tucker – (redshirt) Sophomore; 55 Isaiah Hamlette – (redshirt) Sophomore; 56 Antoine Hopkins – (redshirt) Sophomore; 91 John Graves – (redshirt) Senior; 93 Kwamaine Battle – (redshirt) Junior; 98 Derrick Hopkins – Freshman; Defensive End: Zach McCray – Freshman; 33 Chris Drager – (redshirt) Junior; 42 J.R. Collins – (redshirt) Freshman; 64 Jeff Wardach – Freshman; 66 Tyrel Wilson – (redshirt) Freshman; 82 Steven Friday – (redshirt) Senior; 90 Duan Perez-Means – Freshman; 96 Josh Eadie – (redshirt) Senior; 99 James Gayle – (redshirt) Freshman; Linebacker: Jonathan Halfhide – Freshman; Brian Laiti – Freshman; Dominique Patterson – Freshman; 16 Zach Luckett – (redshirt) Senior; 23 Lorenzo Williams – (redshirt) Sophomore; 24 Tariq Edwards – (redshirt) Freshman; 28 Alonzo Tweedy – (redshirt) Sophomore; 36 Chase Williams – Freshman; 38 Quillie Odeom – Junior; 43 Jeron Gouveia-Winslow – (redshirt) Sophomore; 44 Lyndell Gibson – (redshirt) Sophomore; 51 Bruce Taylor – (redshirt) Sophomore; 52 Barquell Rivers – (redshirt) Junior; 57 Telvion Clark – (redshirt) Freshman; 58 Jack Tyler – (redshirt) Freshman	Cornerback: Detrick Bonner – Freshman; Michael Dennis II – Junior; Mark Carter – Freshman; Carl Jackson – Freshman; Germond Oatneal – Junior; 9 Cris Hill – (redshirt) Junior; 17 Kyle Fuller – Freshman; 20 Jayron Hosley – Sophomore; 21 Roc Carmichael – (redshirt) Senior; 27 Jerrodd Williams – (redshirt) Freshman; 37 Jacob Sykes – (redshirt) Junior; Free Safety: Riley Beiro – Freshman; 1 Antone Exum – (redshirt) Freshman; 15 Eddie Whitley – Junior; 49 Ron Cooper – (redshirt) Senior; Rover: Nick Dew – Freshman; Theron Norman – Freshman; 2 Davon Morgan – Senior; 26 James Hopper – (redshirt) Freshman; 40 Wiley Brown – (redshirt) Sophomore; Long Snapper: Ethan Dickerson – (redshirt) Freshman; Luckas Stump – Freshman; 50 Collin Carroll – (redshirt) Junior; 65 Joe St. Germain – Freshman; Punter: Grant Bowden – (redshirt) Freshman; 30 Brian Saunders – (redshirt) Senior; 83 Scott Demler – (redshirt) Sophomore; Place Kicker: Conor Goulding – Freshman; Lukas Stump – Freshman; Tyler Weiss – (redshirt) Junior; 48 Justin Myer – Junior; 89 Cody Journell – (redshirt) Freshman; 92 Ethan Keyserling – Freshman; 97 Chris Hazley – (redshirt) Senior

== Coaching staff ==
2010 Virginia Tech Hokies coaching staff

Head coach

- Frank Beamer

Assistant coaches

- Billy Hite – Associate head coach and running backs coach
- Bud Foster – Defensive coordinator and inside linebackers coach
- Bryan Stinespring – Offensive coordinator and tight ends
- Jim Cavanaugh – Recruiting coordinator and strong safety and outside linebackers coach
- Torrian Gray – Defensive backfield coach
- Curt Newsome – Offensive line coach
- Mike O'Cain – Quarterbacks coach
- Kevin Sherman – Wide receivers coach
- Charley Wiles – Defensive line coach
- John Ballein – Associate Athletics Director for Football Operations

== Game summaries ==
=== Vs. No. 3 Boise State ===
No. 3 Boise State Broncos vs. No. 10 Virginia Tech Hokies – Game summary

Quarter	1	2	3	4	Total
No. 3 Broncos	17	3	6	7	33
No 10. Hokies	0	14	13	3	30

at FedEx Field, Landover, Maryland

- Date: September 6
- Game time: 8:00 p.m. EDT
- Game weather: Clear, 75 °F (24 °C)
- Game attendance: 86,587
- Referee: John O'Neill
- TV: ESPN
- Box score, Recap

Game information
First quarter
- BSU – Kyle Brotzman 44-yard field goal, 12:44. Broncos 3–0. Drive: 4 plays, 4 yards, 2:01.
- BSU – Austin Pettis 8-yard pass from Kellen Moore (Kyle Brotzman kick), 9:48. Broncos 10–0. Drive: 2 plays, 12 yards, 0:43.
- BSU – Tommy Gallarda 2-yard pass from Kellen Moore (Kyle Brotzman kick), 1:11. Broncos 17–0. Drive: 12 plays, 78 yards, 6:04.

Second quarter

- VT – Ryan Williams 1-yard run (Chris Hazley kick), 11:44. Broncos 17–7. Drive: 9 plays, 67 yards, 4:20.
- BSU – Kyle Brotzman 47-yard field goal, 10:23. Broncos 20–7. Drive: 5 plays, 30 yards, 1:21.
- VT – Ryan Williams 12-yard pass from Tyrod Taylor (Chris Hazley kick), 0:57. Broncos 20–14. Drive: 5 plays, 39 yards, 2:21.

Third quarter

- VT – Ryan Williams 1-yard run (Chris Hazley kick), 6:34. Hokies 21–20. Drive: 7 plays, 31 yards, 3:15.
- BSU – D. J. Harper 71-yard run (kick failed), 5:38. Broncos 26–21. Drive: 3 plays, 80 yards, 0:56.
- VT – Jarrett Boykin 28-yard pass from Tyrod Taylor (pass failed), 2:40. Hokies 27–26. Drive: 5 plays, 77 yards, 2:51.

Fourth quarter

- VT – Chris Hazley 34-yard field goal, 7:38. Hokies 30–26. Drive: 10 plays, 64 yards, 5:20.
- BSU – Austin Pettis 13-yard pass from Kellen Moore (Kyle Brotzman kick), 1:09. Broncos 33–30. Drive: 5 plays, 56 yards, 0:38.

Statistics	BSU	VT
First downs	18	21
Total yards	383	314
Rushing yards	168	128
Passing yards	215	186
Turnovers	2	1
Time of possession	25:40	34:20

Team	Category	Player	Statistics
Boise State	Passing	Kellen Moore	23/38, 215 yards, 3 TD
Boise State	Rushing	Doug Martin	12 rushes, 83 yards
Boise State	Receiving	Titus Young	6 receptions, 80 yards
Virginia Tech	Passing	Tyrod Taylor	15/22, 186 yards, 2 TD
Virginia Tech	Rushing	Tyrod Taylor	16 rushes, 73 yards
Virginia Tech	Receiving	Jarrett Boykin	6 receptions, 102 yards, TD

=== No. 12 (FCS) James Madison ===
No. 12 (FCS) James Madison Dukes at No. 13 Virginia Tech Hokies – Game summary

Quarter	1	2	3	4	Total
No. 12 (FCS) Dukes	0	7	7	7	21
No. 13 Hokies	7	6	3	0	16

at Lane Stadium, Blacksburg, Virginia

- Date: September 11
- Game time: 1:30 p.m. EDT
- Game weather: Drizzle, 59 °F (15 °C)
- Game attendance: 66,233
- Referee: J. Magallanes
- TV: ESPN3
- Box score, Recap

Game information
First quarter
- VT – Jarrett Boykin 9-yard pass from Tyrod Taylor (Chris Hazley kick), 3:24. Hokies 7–0. Drive: 17 plays, 94 yards, 8:48.

Second quarter

- VT – Chris Hazley 30-yard field goal, 7:03. Hokies 10–0. Drive: 10 plays, 55 yards, 3:59.
- JMU – Jamal Sullivan 77-yard pass from Drew Dudzik (Dixon Wright kick), 4:53. Hokies 10–7. Drive: 3 plays, 70 yards, 2:03.
- VT – Chris Hazley 41-yard field goal, 0:19. Hokies 13–7. Drive: 8 plays, 34 yards, 4:26.

Third quarter

- VT – Chris Hazley 28-yard field goal, 11:32. Hokies 16–7. Drive: 7 plays, 50 yards, 3:28.
- JMU – Dwight Dudzik 7-yard run (Dixon Wright kick), 4:06. Hokies 16–14. Drive: 14 plays, 66 yards, 7:17.

Fourth quarter

- JMU – Dwight Dudzik 12-yard run (Dixon Wright kick), 13:45. Dukes 21–16. Drive: 8 plays, 62 yards, 4:03.

Statistics	JMU	VT
First downs	14	23
Total yards	235	362
Rushing yards	114	238
Passing yards	121	124
Turnovers	0	3
Time of possession	28:17	31:43

Team	Category	Player	Statistics
James Madison	Passing	Dwight Dudzik	5/8, 121 yards, TD
James Madison	Rushing	Jamal Sullivan	20 rushes, 49 yards
James Madison	Receiving	Jamal Sullivan	1 reception, 77 yards, TD
Virginia Tech	Passing	Tyrod Taylor	10/16, 124 yards, TD, INT
Virginia Tech	Rushing	Ryan Williams	20 rushes, 91 yards
Virginia Tech	Receiving	Danny Coale	3 receptions, 52 yards

=== East Carolina ===
East Carolina Pirates at Virginia Tech Hokies – Game summary

Quarter	1	2	3	4	Total
Pirates	10	14	3	0	27
Hokies	7	14	14	14	49

at Lane Stadium, Blacksburg, Virginia

- Date: September 18
- Game time: 1:30 p.m. EDT
- Game weather: Clear, 76 °F (24 °C)
- Game attendance: 66,233
- Referee: Tom McCreesh
- TV: ESPN3
- Box score, Recap

Game information
First quarter
- ECU – Mike Barbour 26-yard field goal, 8:21. Pirates 3–0. Drive: 14 plays, 70 yards, 6:39.
- ECU – Jonathan Williams 2-yard run (Mike Barbour kick), 5:42. Pirates 10–0. Drive: 5 plays, 56 yards, 1:35.
- VT – Ryan Williams 2-yard run (Chris Hazley kick), 1:41. Pirates 10–7. Drive: 7 plays, 70 yards, 3:54.

Second quarter

- ECU – Dwayne Harris 7-yard pass from Dominique Davis (Mike Barbour kick), 14:50. Pirates 17–7. Drive: 8 plays, 60 yards, 1:51.
- VT – Dyrell Roberts 24-yard pass from Tyrod Taylor (Chris Hazley kick), 12:03. Pirates 17–14. Drive: 5 plays, 71 yards, 2:42.
- VT – Darren Evans 7-yard run (Chris Hazley kick), 5:58. Hokies 21–17. Drive: 8 plays, 75 yards, 3:30.
- ECU – Jonathan Williams 1-yard run (Mike Barbour kick), 0:26. Pirates 24–21. Drive: 13 plays, 80 yards, 5:32.

Third quarter

- ECU – Mike Barbour 41-yard field goal, 10:43. Pirates 27–21. Drive: 7 plays, 15 yards, 3:57.
- VT – David Wilson 3-yard run (Chris Hazley kick), 4:34. Hokies 28–27. Drive: 7 plays, 69 yards, 2:47.
- VT – David Wilson 8-yard run (Chris Hazley kick), 0:29. Hokies 35–27. Drive: 6 plays, 39 yards, 2:58.

Fourth quarter

- VT – Roc Carmichael 68-yard interception return (Chris Hazley kick), 13:22. Hokies 42–27.
- VT – Jarrett Boykin 69-yard pass from Tyrod Taylor (Chris Hazley kick), 10:53. Hokies 49–27. Drive: 1 play, 69 yards, 0:12.

Statistics	ECU	VT
First downs	22	22
Total yards	361	448
Rushing yards	110	249
Passing yards	251	199
Turnovers	2	1
Time of possession	32:43	27:17

Team	Category	Player	Statistics
East Carolina	Passing	Dominique Davis	30/44, 251 yards, TD, 2 INT
East Carolina	Rushing	Jonathan Williams	17 rushes, 72 yards, 2 TD
East Carolina	Receiving	Dwayne Harris	10 receptions, 119 yards, TD
Virginia Tech	Passing	Tyrod Taylor	8/16, 199 yards, 2 TD
Virginia Tech	Rushing	Darren Evans	10 rushes, 91 yards, TD
Virginia Tech	Receiving	Jarrett Boykin	3 receptions, 118 yards, TD

=== At Boston College ===
Virginia Tech Hokies at Boston College Eagles – Game summary

Quarter	1	2	3	4	Total
Hokies	0	7	9	3	19
Eagles	0	0	0	0	0

at Alumni Stadium, Chestnut Hill, Massachusetts

- Date: September 25
- Game time: 12:00 p.m. EDT
- Game weather: Mostly sunny, 83 °F (28 °C)
- Game attendance: 42,317
- Referee: Jeff Flanagan
- TV: ACCN
- Box score, Recap

Game information
First quarter
- No scoring plays

Second quarter

- VT – Darren Evans 3-yard run (Chris Hazley kick), 14:55. Hokies 7–0. Drive: 9 plays, 80 yards, 4:11.

Third quarter

- VT – Chris Hazley 29-yard field goal, 11:17. Hokies 10–0. Drive: 7 plays, 57 yards, 3:43.
- VT – Chris Hazley 45-yard field goal, 7:45. Hokies 13–0. Drive: 4 plays, -4 yards, 2:00.
- VT – Chris Hazley 29-yard field goal, 4:13. Hokies 16–0. Drive: 6 plays, 20 yards, 2:45.

Fourth quarter

- VT – Chris Hazley 32-yard field goal, 3:48. Hokies 19–0. Drive: 8 plays, 56 yards, 3:50.

Statistics	VT	BC
First downs	16	16
Total yards	343	250
Rushing yards	106	70
Passing yards	237	180
Turnovers	1	3
Time of possession	33:21	26:39

Team	Category	Player	Statistics
Virginia Tech	Passing	Tyrod Taylor	16/21, 237 yards, INT
Virginia Tech	Rushing	David Wilson	16 rushes, 67 yards
Virginia Tech	Receiving	Danny Coale	3 receptions, 91 yards
Boston College	Passing	Dave Shinskie	11/25, 130 yards, 2 INT
Boston College	Rushing	Montel Harris	19 rushes, 111 yards
Boston College	Receiving	Clyde Lee	4 receptions, 42 yards

=== At No. 23 NC State ===
Virginia Tech Hokies at No. 23 NC State Wolfpack – Game summary

Quarter	1	2	3	4	Total
Hokies	0	7	14	20	41
No. 23 Wolfpack	14	3	10	3	30

at Carter–Finley Stadium, Raleigh, North Carolina

- Date: October 2
- Game time: 3:30 p.m. EDT
- Game weather: Mostly sunny, 69 °F (21 °C)
- Game attendance: 58,083
- Referee: Tim Zimorski
- TV: ABC
- Box score, Recap

Game information
First quarter
- NCST – George Bryan 7-yard pass from Russell Wilson (Josh Czajkowski kick), 11:10. Wolfpack 7–0. Drive: 9 plays, 80 yards, 3:50.
- NCST – Dean Haynes 2-yard pass from Russell Wilson (Josh Czajkowski kick), 6:23. Wolfpack 14–0. Drive: 3 plays, 2 yards, 0:45.

Second quarter

- NCST – Josh Czajkowski 37-yard field goal, 14:11. Wolfpack 17–0. Drive: 9 plays, 74 yards, 3:27.
- VT – Andre Phillip Smith 10-yard pass from Tyrod Taylor (Chris Hazley kick), 6:34. Wolfpack 17–7. Drive: 4 plays, 82 yards, 1:43.

Third quarter

- VT – David Wilson 92-yard kickoff return (kick failed), 14:48. Wolfpack 17–13.
- NCST – Jarvis Williams 34-yard pass from Russell Wilson (Josh Czajkowski kick), 11:41. Wolfpack 24–13. Drive: 6 plays, 66 yards, 3:02.
- VT – Darren Evans 54-yard run (Tyrod Taylor pass to Danny Coale), 9:09. Wolfpack 24–21. Drive: 5 plays, 81 yards, 2:26.
- NCST – Josh Czajkowski 32-yard field goal, 4:51. Wolfpack 27–21. Drive: 10 plays, 61 yards, 4:10.

Fourth quarter

- VT – Andre Phillip Smith 4-yard pass from Tyrod Taylor (Chris Hazley kick), 12:24. Hokies 28–27. Drive: 8 plays, 59 yards, 3:36.
- NCST – Josh Czajkowski 42-yard field goal, 4:42. Wolfpack 30–28. Drive: 6 plays, 37 yards, 3:25.
- VT – Jarrett Boykin 39-yard pass from Tyrod Taylor (pass failed), 1:27. Hokies 34–30. Drive: 7 plays, 76 yards, 3:08.
- VT – Darren Evans 3-yard run (Chris Hazley kick), 0:28. Hokies 41–30. Drive: 1 play, 6 yards, 0:34.

Statistics	VT	NCST
First downs	18	24
Total yards	440	507
Rushing yards	317	145
Passing yards	123	362
Turnovers	1	3
Time of possession	28:21	31:39

Team	Category	Player	Statistics
Virginia Tech	Passing	Tyrod Taylor	12/24, 123 yards, 3 TD, INT
Virginia Tech	Rushing	Darren Evans	15 rushes, 160 yards, 2 TD
Virginia Tech	Receiving	Jarrett Boykin	2 receptions, 47 yards, TD
NC State	Passing	Russell Wilson	21/49, 362 yards, 3 TD, 3 INT
NC State	Rushing	Mustafa Greene	10 rushes, 91 yards
NC State	Receiving	Owen Spencer	6 receptions, 145 yards

=== Central Michigan ===
Central Michigan Chippewas at Virginia Tech Hokies – Game summary

Quarter	1	2	3	4	Total
Chippewas	7	0	0	14	21
Hokies	7	17	7	14	45

at Lane Stadium, Blacksburg, Virginia

- Date: October 9
- Game time: 12:00 p.m. EDT
- Game attendance: 66,233
- TV: ESPNU

Statistics	CMU	VT
First downs		
Total yards		
Rushing yards		
Passing yards		
Turnovers		
Time of possession		

Team	Category	Player	Statistics
Central Michigan	Passing		
Central Michigan	Rushing		
Central Michigan	Receiving		
Virginia Tech	Passing		
Virginia Tech	Rushing		
Virginia Tech	Receiving		

=== Wake Forest ===
Wake Forest Demon Deacons at Virginia Tech Hokies – Game summary

Quarter	1	2	3	4	Total
Demon Deacons	7	7	7	0	21
Hokies	21	28	3	0	52

at Lane Stadium, Blacksburg, Virginia

- Date: October 16
- Game time: 3:30 p.m. EDT
- Game attendance: 66,233
- TV: ESPNU

Statistics	WAKE	VT
First downs		
Total yards		
Rushing yards		
Passing yards		
Turnovers		
Time of possession		

Team	Category	Player	Statistics
Wake Forest	Passing		
Wake Forest	Rushing		
Wake Forest	Receiving		
Virginia Tech	Passing		
Virginia Tech	Rushing		
Virginia Tech	Receiving		

=== Duke ===
Duke Blue Devils at No. 23 Virginia Tech Hokies – Game summary

Quarter	1	2	3	4	Total
Blue Devils	0	0	7	0	7
No. 23 Hokies	14	13	17	0	44

at Lane Stadium, Blacksburg, Virginia

- Date: October 23
- Game time: 3:30 p.m. EDT
- Game attendance: 66,233
- TV: ACCN

Statistics	DUKE	VT
First downs		
Total yards		
Rushing yards		
Passing yards		
Turnovers		
Time of possession		

Team	Category	Player	Statistics
Duke	Passing		
Duke	Rushing		
Duke	Receiving		
Virginia Tech	Passing		
Virginia Tech	Rushing		
Virginia Tech	Receiving		

=== Georgia Tech ===
Georgia Tech Yellow Jackets at No. 20 Virginia Tech Hokies – Game summary

Quarter	1	2	3	4	Total
Yellow Jackets	14	0	0	7	21
No. 20 Hokies	0	7	0	21	28

at Lane Stadium, Blacksburg, Virginia

- Date: November 4
- Game time: 7:30 p.m. EDT
- Game attendance: 66,233
- TV: ESPN

Statistics	GT	VT
First downs		
Total yards		
Rushing yards		
Passing yards		
Turnovers		
Time of possession		

Team	Category	Player	Statistics
Georgia Tech	Passing		
Georgia Tech	Rushing		
Georgia Tech	Receiving		
Virginia Tech	Passing		
Virginia Tech	Rushing		
Virginia Tech	Receiving		

=== At North Carolina ===
No. 16 Virginia Tech Hokies at North Carolina Tar Heels – Game summary

Quarter	1	2	3	4	Total
No. 16 Hokies	6	3	17	0	26
Tar Heels	7	3	0	0	10

at Kenan Memorial Stadium, Chapel Hill, North Carolina

- Date: November 13
- Game time: 3:30 p.m. EST
- Game attendance: 60,000
- TV: ABC/ESPN

Statistics	VT	UNC
First downs		
Total yards		
Rushing yards		
Passing yards		
Turnovers		
Time of possession		

Team	Category	Player	Statistics
Virginia Tech	Passing		
Virginia Tech	Rushing		
Virginia Tech	Receiving		
North Carolina	Passing		
North Carolina	Rushing		
North Carolina	Receiving		

=== At No. 24 Miami (FL) ===
No. 14 Virginia Tech Hokies at No. 24 Miami Hurricanes – Game summary

Quarter	1	2	3	4	Total
No. 14 Hokies	7	3	7	14	31
No. 24 Hurricanes	7	3	7	0	17

at Sun Life Stadium, Miami Gardens, Florida

- Date: November 20
- Game time: 3:30 p.m. EST
- Game attendance: 40,101
- TV: ESPN

Statistics	VT	MIA
First downs		
Total yards		
Rushing yards		
Passing yards		
Turnovers		
Time of possession		

Team	Category	Player	Statistics
Virginia Tech	Passing		
Virginia Tech	Rushing		
Virginia Tech	Receiving		
Miami	Passing		
Miami	Rushing		
Miami	Receiving		

=== Virginia ===
Virginia Cavaliers at No. 13 Virginia Tech Hokies – Game summary

Quarter	1	2	3	4	Total
Cavaliers	0	0	0	7	7
No. 13 Hokies	0	17	14	6	37

at Lane Stadium, Blacksburg, Virginia

- Date: November 27
- Game time: 12:00 p.m. EST
- Game attendance: 66,233
- TV: ACCN

Statistics	UVA	VT
First downs		
Total yards		
Rushing yards		
Passing yards		
Turnovers		
Time of possession		

Team	Category	Player	Statistics
Virginia	Passing		
Virginia	Rushing		
Virginia	Receiving		
Virginia Tech	Passing		
Virginia Tech	Rushing		
Virginia Tech	Receiving		

=== Vs. No. 20 Florida State (ACC Championship Game) ===
2010 ACC Championship Game
No. 20 Florida State Seminoles vs. No. 12 Virginia Tech Hokies – Game summary

Quarter	1	2	3	4	Total
No. 20 Seminoles	10	7	7	9	33
No. 12 Hokies	14	7	14	9	44

at Bank of America Stadium, Charlotte, North Carolina

- Date: December 4
- Game time: 7:45 p.m. EST
- Game weather: Rain, 36 °F (2 °C)
- Game attendance: 72,379
- Referee: Brad Allen
- TV announcers (ESPN): Sean McDonough, Matt Millen, and Heather Cox
- Box score, Recap

Game information
First quarter
- FSU – Dustin Hopkins 32-yard field goal, 11:43. Seminoles 3–0. Drive: 8 plays, 53 yards, 3:10.
- VT – Jeron Gouveia-Winslow 24-yard interception return (Chris Hazley kick), 8:05. Hokies 7–3.
- VT – Darren Evans 9-yard run (Chris Hazley kick), 4:37. Hokies 14–3. Drive: 3 plays, 65 yards, 1:11.
- FSU – Ty Jones 2-yard run (Dustin Hopkins kick), 1:59. Hokies 14–10. Drive: 6 plays, 68 yards, 2:32.

Second quarter

- VT – Jarrett Boykin 19-yard pass from Tyrod Taylor (Chris Hazley kick), 10:34. Hokies 21–10. Drive: 13 plays, 91 yards, 6:18.
- FSU – Ty Jones 6-yard run (Dustin Hopkins kick), 5:48. Hokies 21–17. Drive: 10 plays, 78 yards, 4:40.

Third quarter

- VT – Danny Coale 45-yard pass from Tyrod Taylor (Chris Hazley kick), 11:29. Hokies 28–17. Drive: 7 plays, 67 yards, 3:26.
- VT – David Wilson 21-yard pass from Tyrod Taylor (Chris Hazley kick), 4:43. Hokies 35–17. Drive: 9 plays, 61 yards, 4:44.
- FSU – Ty Jones 1-yard run (Dustin Hopkins kick), 1:44. Hokies 35–24. Drive: 8 plays, 53 yards, 2:53.

Fourth quarter

- VT – Tyrod Taylor 5-yard run (kick blocked), 11:29. Hokies 41–24. Drive: 11 plays, 82 yards, 5:11.
- FSU – Nigel Bradham 98-yard defensive PAT return, 11:29. Hokies 41–26.
- VT – Chris Hazley 43-yard field goal, 6:58. Hokies 44–26. Drive: 4 plays, 8 yards, 2:31.
- FSU – Chris Thompson 20-yard pass from EJ Manuel (Dustin Hopkins kick), 0:07. Hokies 44–33. Drive: 12 plays, 75 yards, 1:48.

Statistics	FSU	VT
First downs	19	21
Total yards	341	436
Rushing yards	53	173
Passing yards	288	263
Turnovers	2	0
Time of possession	24:59	35:01

Team	Category	Player	Statistics
Florida State	Passing	EJ Manuel	23/31, 288 yards, TD, 2 INT
Florida State	Rushing	Ty Jones	6 rushes, 24 yards, 3 TD
Florida State	Receiving	Taiwan Easterling	6 receptions, 79 yards
Virginia Tech	Passing	Tyrod Taylor	18/28, 263 yards, 3 TD
Virginia Tech	Rushing	Darren Evans	6 rushes, 69 yards, TD
Virginia Tech	Receiving	Danny Coale	6 receptions, 143 yards, TD

=== Vs. No. 5 Stanford (Orange Bowl) ===
2011 Orange Bowl
No. 5 Stanford Cardinal vs. No. 12 Virginia Tech Hokies – Game summary

Quarter	1	2	3	4	Total
No. 5 Cardinal	7	6	13	14	40
No. 12 Hokies	2	10	0	0	12

at Sun Life Stadium, Miami Gardens, Florida

- Date: January 3, 2011
- Game time: 8:30 p.m. EST
- Game weather: Fair, 72 °F (22 °C)
- Game attendance: 65,453
- Referee: Tom Walker
- TV announcers (ESPN): Mike Tirico, Ron Jaworski, Jon Gruden, and Michele Tafoya
- Box score, Box score

Game information
First quarter
- STAN – Jeremy Stewart 60-yard run (Nate Whitaker kick), 6:16. Cardinal 7–0. Drive: 4 plays, 86 yards, 1:52.
- VT – Derek Hall tackled in own end zone, 0:59. Cardinal 7–2.

Second quarter

- VT – David Wilson 11-yard pass from Tyrod Taylor (Chris Hazley kick), 10:22. Hokies 9–7. Drive: 10 plays, 75 yards, 5:37.
- STAN – Zach Ertz 25-yard pass from Andrew Luck (kick blocked), 6:32. Cardinal 13–9. Drive: 8 plays, 79 yards, 3:50.
- VT – Chris Hazley 37-yard field goal, 0:03. Cardinal 13–12. Drive: 6 plays, 60 yards, 0:44.

Third quarter

- STAN – Owen Marecic 1-yard run (kick failed), 8:47. Cardinal 19–12. Drive: 9 plays, 59 yards, 4:26.
- STAN – Coby Fleener 41-yard pass from Andrew Luck (Nate Whitaker kick), 5:49. Cardinal 26–12. Drive: 2 plays, 97 yards, 0:29.

Fourth quarter

- STAN – Coby Fleener 58-yard pass from Andrew Luck (Nate Whitaker kick), 12:28. Cardinal 33–12. Drive: 8 plays, 87 yards, 5:06.
- STAN – Coby Fleener 38-yard pass from Andrew Luck (Nate Whitaker kick), 6:05. Cardinal 40–12. Drive: 3 plays, 72 yards, 1:34.

Statistics	STAN	VT
First downs	19	16
Total yards	534	291
Rushing yards	247	67
Passing yards	287	224
Turnovers	2	1
Time of possession	27:46	32:14

Team	Category	Player	Statistics
Stanford	Passing	Andrew Luck	18/23, 287 yards, 4 TD, INT
Stanford	Rushing	Stepfan Taylor	13 rushes, 114 yards
Stanford	Receiving	Coby Fleener	6 receptions, 173 yards, 3 TD
Virginia Tech	Passing	Tyrod Taylor	16/31, 222 yards, TD, INT
Virginia Tech	Rushing	Darren Evans	12 rushes, 37 yards
Virginia Tech	Receiving	Danny Coale	7 receptions, 92 yards

== Flyovers ==
Virginia Tech home games have featured flyovers by military aircraft.

Date	Opponent	aircraft	origin	comments
September 11	James Madison	Boeing C-17 Globemaster III	Altus Air Force Base	air crew included 2 Virginia Tech alumni
September 18	East Carolina	Bell AH-1 SuperCobra helicopters	Marine Light Attack Helicopter Squadron 775	led by 1987 Virginia Tech alumni
October 5	Central Michigan	E-2C Hawkeye and C-2A Greyhound	Naval Station Norfolk	air crew included 2 Virginia Tech alumni
October 16	Wake Forest	North American B-25 Mitchell	Tri-State Warbird Museum	arranged by Virginia Tech alumnus and World War II pilot Stanley Cohen
