= 2010 Atlantic Coast Conference football season =

- League: NCAA Division I Football Bowl Subdivision
- Sport: football
- Duration: September 2, 2010 through January 9, 2011
- Teams: 12
- TV partner(s): ABC, ESPN, ESPN2, ESPNU, Raycom

Regular season
- Season champions: Virginia Tech Hokies
- Runners-up: Florida State Seminoles
- Season MVP: Tyrod Taylor

Football seasons
- ← 2009 2011 →

2010 Atlantic Coast Conference football standings
	Conf.			Overall
Team	W		L	W		L
Atlantic Division
No. 17 Florida State x	6	–	2	10	–	4
No. 23 Maryland	5	–	3	9	–	4
No. 25 NC State	5	–	3	9	–	4
Boston College	4	–	4	7	–	6
Clemson	4	–	4	6	–	7
Wake Forest	1	–	7	3	–	9
Coastal Division
No. 16 Virginia Tech x$	8	–	0	11	–	3
Miami (FL)	5	–	3	7	–	6
Georgia Tech	4	–	4	6	–	7
North Carolina	4	–	4	8	–	5
Duke	1	–	7	3	–	9
Virginia	1	–	7	4	–	8
Championship: Virginia Tech 44, Florida State 33
$ – BCS representative as conference champion; x – Division champion/co-champions; Rankings from AP Poll

The 2010 Atlantic Coast Conference football season was the 58th season of Atlantic Coast Conference football. The season started September 2, 2010 and ended January 9, 2011. The twelve conference schools were divided into two divisions. The Virginia Tech Hokies won the Coastal Division while the Florida State Seminoles won the Atlantic Division. On December 4, 2010, the Hokies defeated the Seminoles 44–33 to win the 2010 ACC Championship and the right to represent the conference in the 2011 Orange Bowl, where the Hokies lost 12–40 to the Stanford Cardinal of the Pac-10.

== Member schools ==
Institution	Nickname	Location	Founded	Joined ACC	School type	ACC Football Titles
Boston College	Eagles	Chestnut Hill, Massachusetts	1863	2005	Private/Jesuit	0
Clemson	Tigers	Clemson, South Carolina	1889	1953	Public	13
Duke	Blue Devils	Durham, North Carolina	1838	1953	Private/Non-Sectarian	7
Florida State	Seminoles	Tallahassee, Florida	1851	1991	Public	12
Georgia Tech	Yellow Jackets	Atlanta	1885	1979	Public	3
Maryland	Terrapins	College Park, Maryland	1856	1953	Public	9
Miami	Hurricanes	Coral Gables, Florida	1925	2004	Private/Non-Sectarian	0
North Carolina	Tar Heels	Chapel Hill, North Carolina	1789	1953	Public	5
NC State	Wolfpack	Raleigh, North Carolina	1887	1953	Public	7
Virginia	Cavaliers	Charlottesville, Virginia	1819	1953	Public	2
Virginia Tech	Hokies	Blacksburg, Virginia	1872	2004	Public	3
Wake Forest	Demon Deacons	Winston-Salem, North Carolina	1834	1953	Private/Non-Sectarian	2

== Coaches ==
Team	Head coach	Years at school	Overall record	Record at school	ACC record
Boston College	Frank Spaziani	3	9–5	9–5	5–3
Clemson	Dabo Swinney	3	13–8	13–8	9–4
Duke	David Cutcliffe	3	53–44	9–15	4–12
Florida State	Jimbo Fisher	1	1–0	1–0	0–0
Georgia Tech	Paul Johnson	3	126–46	20–7	12–4
Maryland	Ralph Friedgen	10	66–46	66–46	38–34
Miami	Randy Shannon	4	21–17	21–17	11–13
North Carolina	Butch Davis	4	71–38	20–18	11–13
NC State	Tom O'Brien	4	91–66	16–21	9–15
Virginia	Mike London	1	24–5	0–0	0–0
Virginia Tech	Frank Beamer	24	229–115–4	187–92–2	38–10
Wake Forest	Jim Grobe	9	92–84–1	59–51	31–41

== ACC vs. BCS conference opponents ==
NOTE:. Games with a * next to the home team represent a neutral site game

Date	Visitor	Home	Significance	Winning team
September 4	LSU	North Carolina*	Chick-fil-A Kickoff Game in Atlanta	LSU
September 11	Georgia Tech	Kansas		Kansas
September 11	Florida State	Oklahoma		Oklahoma
September 11	Miami	Ohio State		Ohio State
September 11	Virginia	USC		USC
September 16	Cincinnati	NC State		NC State
September 18	Alabama	Duke		Alabama
September 18	Maryland	West Virginia	Maryland–West Virginia football rivalry	West Virginia
September 18	Wake Forest	Stanford		Stanford
September 18	Clemson	Auburn	Auburn–Clemson football rivalry	Auburn
September 23	Miami	Pittsburgh		Miami
September 25	North Carolina	Rutgers		North Carolina
October 2	Notre Dame	Boston College		Notre Dame
November 27	Florida	Florida State	Florida–Florida State football rivalry	Florida State
November 27	Georgia Tech	Georgia	Clean, Old-Fashioned Hate	Georgia
November 27	South Carolina	Clemson	Battle of the Palmetto State	South Carolina
November 27	Wake Forest	Vanderbilt		Wake Forest
November 27	Boston College	Syracuse		Boston College
November 27	South Florida	Miami		South Florida

== Bowl games ==
Date	ACC Team	Opponent	Bowl	Location	Winning team
December 27, 2010	Georgia Tech	Air Force	AdvoCare V100 Independence Bowl	Shreveport, Louisiana	Air Force
December 28, 2010	NC State	West Virginia	Champs Sports Bowl	Orlando, Florida	NC State
December 29, 2010	Maryland	East Carolina	Military Bowl Presented by Northrop Grumman	Washington, D.C.	Maryland
December 30, 2010	North Carolina	Tennessee	Franklin American Mortgage Music City Bowl	Nashville, Tennessee	North Carolina
December 31, 2010	Clemson	South Florida	Meineke Car Care Bowl	Charlotte, North Carolina	South Florida
December 31, 2010	Miami	Notre Dame	Hyundai Sun Bowl	El Paso, Texas	Notre Dame
December 31, 2010	Florida State	South Carolina	Chick-fil-A Bowl	Atlanta	Florida State
January 3, 2011	Virginia Tech	Stanford	Discover Orange Bowl	Miami Gardens, Florida	Stanford
January 9, 2011	Boston College	Nevada	Kraft Fight Hunger Bowl	San Francisco	Nevada

== Postseason ==
=== All-conference teams ===
==== First Team ====
Offense

Position	Player	School
Quarterback	Tyrod Taylor	Virginia Tech
Running back	Montel Harris	Boston College
Running back	Anthony Allen	Georgia Tech
Wide receiver	Leonard Hankerson	Miami
Wide receiver	Torrey Smith	Maryland
Tight end	George Bryan	NC State
Tackle	Anthony Castonzo	Boston College
Tackle	Chris Hairston	Clemson
Guard	Rodney Hudson	Florida State
Guard	Brandon Washington	Miami
Center	Sean Bedford	Georgia Tech
Placekicker	Chris Hazley	Virginia Tech
Specialist	Tony Logan	Maryland

Defense

Position	Player	School
Defensive end	Da'Quan Bowers	Clemson
Defensive end	Brandon Jenkins	Florida State
Defensive tackle	Quinton Coples	North Carolina
Defensive tackle	Jarvis Jenkins	Clemson
Linebacker	Luke Kuechly	Boston College
Linebacker	Nate Irving	NC State
Linebacker	Alex Wujciak	Maryland
Cornerback	Jayron Hosley	Virginia Tech
Cornerback	Chase Minnifield	Virginia
Safety	DeAndre McDaniel	Clemson
Safety	Kenny Tate	Maryland
Punter	Matt Bosher	Miami

==== Second Team ====
Offense

Position	Player	School
Quarterback	Russell Wilson	NC State
Running back	Damien Berry	Miami
Running back	Keith Payne	Virginia
Wide receiver	Conner Vernon	Duke
Wide receiver	Owen Spencer	NC State
Tight end	Dwayne Allen	Clemson
Tackle	Orlando Franklin	Miami
Tackle	Blake DeChristopher	Virginia Tech
Guard	Jaymes Brooks	Virginia Tech
Guard	Omoregie Uzzi	Georgia Tech
Guard	Jonathan Cooper	North Carolina
Center	Ryan McMahon	Florida State
Placekicker	Will Snyderwine	Duke
Specialist	David Wilson	Virginia Tech

Defense

Position	Player	School
Defensive end	Allen Bailey	Miami
Defensive end	Steven Friday	Virginia Tech
Defensive tackle	John Graves	Virginia Tech
Defensive tackle	Joe Vellano	Maryland
Linebacker	Bruce Carter	North Carolina
Linebacker	Bruce Taylor	Virginia Tech
Linebacker	Sean Spence	Miami
Cornerback	Xavier Rhodes	Florida State
Cornerback	Brandon Harris	Miami
Safety	Davon Morgan	Virginia Tech
Safety	Ray-Ray Armstrong	Miami
Punter	Brian Saunders	Virginia Tech
