= 2010 Stanford Cardinal football team =

American college football season

2010 Stanford Cardinal football

Orange Bowl champion

Orange Bowl, W 40–12 vs. Virginia Tech
- Conference: Pacific-10 Conference

Ranking
- Coaches: No. 4
- AP: No. 4
- Record: 12–1 (8–1 Pac-10)
- Head coach: Jim Harbaugh (4th season)
- Offensive coordinator: David Shaw (4th season)
- Offensive scheme: Pro-style
- Defensive coordinator: Vic Fangio (1st season)
- Base defense: 3–4
- Home stadium: Stanford Stadium

Uniform

2010 Pacific-10 Conference football standings
	Conf.			Overall
Team	W		L	W		L
No. 3 Oregon $	9	–	0	12	–	1
No. 4 Stanford %	8	–	1	12	–	1
USC †	5	–	4	8	–	5
Washington	5	–	4	7	–	6
Arizona	4	–	5	7	–	6
Arizona State	4	–	5	6	–	6
Oregon State	4	–	5	5	–	7
California	3	–	6	5	–	7
UCLA	2	–	7	4	–	8
Washington State	1	–	8	2	–	10
$ – BCS representative as conference champion; % – BCS at-large representative; † – USC ineligible for championship and post-season due to NCAA sanctions; Rankings from AP Poll

The 2010 Stanford Cardinal football team represented Stanford University in the 2010 NCAA Division I FBS football season. The Cardinal were led by head coach Jim Harbaugh, who was in his 4th and final season before leaving to become head coach of the San Francisco 49ers. Harbaugh ended his four-year tenure at Stanford having taken a team that finished 1–11 in the year prior to his arrival, to a team that ended the regular season 11–1. They played their home games at Stanford Stadium and were members of the Pacific-10 Conference.

Stanford's sole loss was to conference champion Oregon. They defeated Virginia Tech 40–12 in the Orange Bowl for the first BCS bowl victory in program history.

== Schedule ==
Date	Time	Opponent	Rank	Site	TV	Result	Attendance
September 4	3:30 p.m.	Sacramento State*		Stanford Stadium; Stanford, CA	CSNBA	W 52–17	30,626
September 11	7:30 p.m.	at UCLA	No. 25	Rose Bowl; Pasadena, CA (rivalry)	ESPN	W 35–0	56,931
September 18	8:15 p.m.	Wake Forest*	No. 19	Stanford Stadium; Stanford, CA	ESPN2	W 68–24	39,061
September 25	12:30 p.m.	at Notre Dame*	No. 16	Notre Dame Stadium; Notre Dame, IN (Legends Trophy)	NBC	W 37–14	80,795
October 2	5:00 p.m.	at No. 4 Oregon	No. 9	Autzen Stadium; Eugene, OR (College GameDay, rivalry)	ABC/ESPN2	L 31–52	59,818
October 9	5:00 p.m.	USC	No. 16	Stanford Stadium; Stanford, CA (rivalry)	ABC	W 37–35	51,607
October 23	2:00 p.m.	Washington State^{†}	No. 12	Stanford Stadium; Stanford, CA	FCS	W 38–28	36,679
October 30	4:00 p.m.	at Washington	No. 13	Husky Stadium; Seattle, WA	Versus	W 41–0	69,020
November 6	5:00 p.m.	No. 13 Arizona	No. 10	Stanford Stadium; Stanford, CA	ABC	W 42–17	43,506
November 13	4:30 p.m.	at Arizona State	No. 7	Sun Devil Stadium; Tempe, AZ	CSNBA	W 17–13	45,592
November 20	12:30 p.m.	at California	No. 7	California Memorial Stadium; Berkeley, CA (113th Big Game/Stanford Axe)	FSN	W 48–14	67,793
November 27	4:30 p.m.	Oregon State	No. 7	Stanford Stadium; Stanford, CA	Versus	W 38–0	38,775
January 3, 2011	5:00 p.m.	vs. No. 12 Virginia Tech*	No. 5	Sun Life Stadium; Miami Gardens, FL (Orange Bowl) (College GameDay)	ESPN	W 40–12	65,453
*Non-conference game; ^{†}Homecoming; Rankings from AP Poll released prior to the game; All times are in Pacific time

== Roster ==
2010 Stanford Cardinal football team roster
Players
Coaches
Offense

Pos.	#	Name	Class
WR	89	Doug Baldwin	Sr
C	72	Chase Beeler	Sr
OL	52	David DeCastro	So
TE	86	Zach Ertz	Fr
TE	82	Coby Fleener	Jr
RB	25	Tyler Gaffney	So
TE	85	Ryan Hewitt	Fr
QB	15	Alex Loukas	Sr
QB	12	Andrew Luck	So
OL	77	Tyler Mabry	Jr
FB	48	Owen Marecic	Sr
OL	55	Jonathan Martin	So
QB	6	Josh Nunes	Fr
WR	81	Chris Owusu	Jr
TE	88	Konrad Reuland	Sr
WR	84	Jemari Roberts	So
RB	34	Jeremy Stewart	Jr
RB	33	Stepfan Taylor	So
WR	17	Griff Whalen	Jr
WR	8	Ryan Whalen	Sr
RB	32	Anthony Wilkerson	Fr
OL	76	Kevin Danser	So

Defense

Pos.	#	Name	Class
DL	92	Sione Fua	Sr
SS	26	Delano Howell	Jr
DE	93	Trent Murphy (injured)	So
CB	9	Richard Sherman	Sr
LB	11	Shayne Skov	So
LB	44	Chase Thomas	So

Special teams

Pos.	#	Name	Class
K	39	Nate Whitaker	Sr

Head coach

- Jim Harbaugh

Coordinators/assistant coaches

- David Shaw – Offensive coordinator and running backs
- Pep Hamilton – Quarterbacks and wide receivers
- Tim Drevno – Offensive line and tight ends
- Vic Fangio – Defensive coordinator
- Randy Hart – Defensive line
- Lance Anderson – Outside linebackers and recruiting coordinator
- Derek Mason – Defensive backs
- Brian Polian – Special teams coordinator

Legend

- (C) Team captain
- (S) Suspended
- (I) Ineligible
- Injured
- Redshirt

== Rankings ==
Ranking movements Legend: ██ Increase in ranking ██ Decrease in ranking RV = Received votes
	Week															
Poll	Pre	1	2	3	4	5	6	7	8	9	10	11	12	13	14	Final
AP	RV	25	19	16	9	16	14	12	13	10	7	7	7	5	5	4
Coaches	RV	RV	19	17	13	18	15	14	14	12	9	8	8	5	5	4
Harris	Not released						14	13	13	10	8	8	7	5	5	Not released
BCS	Not released							12	13	13	6	6	6	4	4	Not released

== Game summaries ==
=== Sacramento State ===
Team	1	2	3	4	Total
Hornets	7	0	7	3	17
• Cardinal	21	17	7	7	52

- Location: Stanford Stadium

Andrew Luck threw for 316 yards and a career-high four touchdowns as Stanford routed Sacramento State, 52–17. Doug Baldwin caught an 81-yard touchdown strike from Luck in the first quarter, the eighth-longest Stanford touchdown reception in school history, and caught another 15-yard touchdown pass in the second quarter. Three different Stanford rushers scored from within the two-yard line. For the Hornets, Kyle Monson returned a punt 70 yards for a touchdown, the first Sacramento State punt return for a score in seven years, and kicker Chris Diniz matched his career-longest field goal with a 52-yard kick in the fourth quarter.

=== At UCLA ===
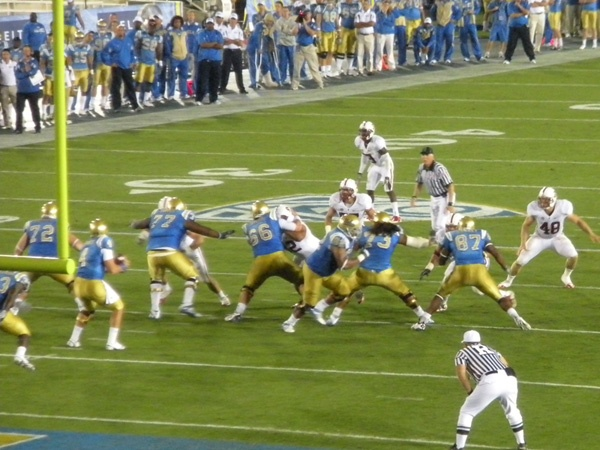
Stanford Cardinal visits UCLA Bruins in the Rose Bowl

#25 Stanford at UCLA

Team	1	2	3	4	Total
• No. 25 Cardinal	10	3	15	7	35
Bruins	0	0	0	0	0

- Location: Rose Bowl

Stanford safety Michael Thomas (top, left photo) stripped the ball and ran 21 yards for one touchdown, and Stanford quarterback Andrew Luck rushed for a career-best 63 yards and threw for 151 yards and two more touchdowns as Stanford shut out UCLA 35–0. It was the first time UCLA had lost at home to Stanford since 1996 and was the first shutout UCLA had suffered at home since a 17–0 loss to California on October 16, 1999. It was also the first time Stanford had achieved a road shutout against an opponent since 1974 and the first time since 1941 that Stanford had shut out UCLA.

=== Wake Forest ===
Wake Forest at #19 Stanford

Team	1	2	3	4	Total
Demon Deacons	7	3	14	0	24
• No. 19 Cardinal	14	27	14	13	68

- Location: Stanford Stadium

In their 2009 meeting, the Demon Deacons defeated the Cardinal 24–17 at BB&T Field in Winston-Salem, North Carolina, but the Cardinal got revenge in this game, scoring touchdowns on their first eight possessions on the way to a 68–24 rout. Quarterback Andrew Luck has scored 11 touchdowns in the first three games. This is the fifth time in 36 seasons, and the first time since 2001 that the Cardinal has started 3–0. The win is the 13th in Stanford's last 15 home games. They are averaging 51.7 points per game through three games, the best offensive start to a season for the Cardinal since scoring 164 points in the first three games of the 1923 season. This was the most points Stanford had scored in a game since 1968 when the Cardinal scored 68 points against San Jose State. Wake Forest has given up 116 points combined in its last three games. This was the most points allowed by Wake Forest since a 72–13 loss to Florida State in 1995.

=== At Notre Dame ===
#16 Stanford at Notre Dame

Team	1	2	3	4	Total
• No. 16 Cardinal	10	6	3	18	37
Fighting Irish	3	3	0	8	14

- Location: Notre Dame Stadium
- Game attendance: 59,075

Owen Marecic scored on a one-yard touchdown plunge, then returned an interception for a touchdown two plays later as Stanford defeated Notre Dame 37–14, the team's first win in South Bend since 1992. Stanford placekicker Nate Whitaker added five field goals to tie a Stanford single-game record to help the Cardinal move to 4–0 for the first time since 1986.

=== At Oregon ===
#9 Stanford at #4 Oregon

Team	1	2	3	4	Total
No. 9 Cardinal	21	10	0	0	31
• No. 4 Ducks	3	21	14	14	52

- Date: October 2
- Location: Autzen Stadium
- Game attendance: 59,818

Scoring summary
1	11:01	Oregon	Rob Beard 22-yard field goal	Oregon 3–0
1	5:06	STAN	Griff Whalen 18-yard pass from Andrew Luck (Nate Whitaker kick)	STAN 7–3
1	4:02	STAN	Andrew Luck 10-yard run (Nate Whitaker kick)	STAN 14–3
1	1:08	STAN	Stepfan Taylor 44-yard run (Nate Whitaker kick)	STAN 21–3
2	13:17	Oregon	Jeff Maehl 29-yard pass from Darron Thomas (Rob Beard kick)	STAN 21–10
2	11:18	Oregon	LaMichael James 5-yard run (Rob Beard kick)	STAN 21–17
2	7:30	STAN	Coby Fleener 36-yard pass from Andrew Luck (Nate Whitaker kick)	STAN 28–17
2	5:41	Oregon	Josh Huff 41-yard pass from Darron Thomas (Rob Beard kick)	STAN 28–24
2	0:00	STAN	Nate Whitaker 46-yard field goal	STAN 31–24
3	8:20	Oregon	Darron Thomas 6-yard run (Rob Beard kick)	Tied 31–31
3	5:34	Oregon	LaMichael James 3-yard run (Rob Beard kick)	Oregon 38–31
4	14:55	Oregon	D.J. Davis 25-yard pass from Darron Thomas (Rob Beard kick)	Oregon 45–31
4	1:10	Oregon	LaMichael James 76-yard run (Rob Beard kick)	Oregon 52–31

The Cardinal started out quickly, scoring three touchdowns in less than five minutes of the first quarter aided by two Duck turnovers. But the Ducks used a risky onside kick to keep the score close at halftime, and in the second half, held the Cardinal scoreless. Meanwhile, Ducks quarterback Darron Thomas threw for 238 yards and three touchdowns and ran for another, while running back LaMichael James rushed for three touchdowns on a career-high 257 yards. Two interceptions by Duck cornerback Cliff Harris and a fourth-quarter fumble by Stanford receiver Chris Owusu sealed the game for the Ducks.

=== USC ===
USC at #16 Stanford

Team	1	2	3	4	Total
Trojans	7	7	7	14	35
• No. 16 Cardinal	7	7	7	16	37

- Location: Stanford Stadium

Scoring summary
Q1	8:17	USC	Baxter 8 yard run (Houston kick)	USC 7–0
Q1	5:39	STAN	Baldwin 11 yard pass from Luck (Whitaker kick)	Tie 7–7
Q2	8:33	STAN	Wilkerson 6 yard run (Whitaker kick)	STAN 14–7
Q2	4:23	USC	Woods 6 yard pass from Barkley (Houston kick)	Tie 14–14
Q3	5:39	STAN	Taylor 1 yard run (Whitaker kick)	STAN 21–14
Q3	2:59	USC	Woods 61 yard pass from Barkley (Houston kick)	Tie 21–21
Q4	14:51	STAN	Reuland 2 yard pass from Luck (Whitaker kick)	STAN 28–21
Q4	11:11	USC	Woods 6 yard pass from Barkley (Houston kick)	Tie 28–28
Q4	9:27	STAN	Baldwin 7 yard pass from Luck (kick failed)	STAN 34–28
Q4	1:08	USC	Bradford 3 yard run (Houston kick)	USC 35–34
Q4	0:00	STAN	Whitaker 30 yard field goal	STAN 37–35

Nate Whitaker kicked a 30-yard field goal as time expired to give the Cardinal a dramatic 37–35 victory over the visiting Trojans. Whitaker had missed a PAT earlier in the fourth quarter, and USC capitalized on the miss to go ahead of Stanford 35–34 with just over a minute to play. But Andrew Luck led the Cardinal on a nine-play, 62-yard drive to set up Whitaker's game winner. In an evenly matched back-and-forth game, Luck and Trojan quarterback Matt Barkley each threw for three touchdowns.

=== Washington State ===
Washington State at #12 Stanford

Team	1	2	3	4	Total
Cougars	0	7	0	21	28
• No. 12 Cardinal	10	14	7	7	38

- Location: Stanford Stadium

Andrew Luck threw for three touchdowns as the Cardinal defeated the Cougars 38–28 to improve their record to 7–1, their best start since the season they appeared in the 1971 Rose Bowl. Stepfan Taylor added two more rushing touchdowns for Stanford. Washington State quarterback Jeff Tuel threw for four touchdowns on the day, including two in the last four minutes of the game to keep the final score close.

=== At Washington ===
#14 Stanford at Washington

Team	1	2	3	4	Total
• No. 14 Cardinal	14	14	10	3	41
Huskies	0	0	0	0	0

- Location: Husky Stadium

Stepfan Taylor ran for two touchdowns, and quarterback Andrew Luck ran 51 yards for another as the Cardinal shut out the Huskies 41–0, the worst shutout for the Huskies at home since 1976. The highly touted matchup between NFL quarterback prospects Luck and Jake Locker turned into a lopsided affair as Washington could only manage 104 yards of offense, as Locker went 7 for 14 with only 88 yards passing, was sacked three times, and intercepted twice.

=== Arizona ===
#13 Arizona at #10 Stanford

Team	1	2	3	4	Total
No. 13 Wildcats	0	3	7	7	17
• No. 10 Cardinal	7	14	14	7	42

- Location: Stanford Stadium

In highly anticipated matchup for second place in the Pac-10, Stanford overwhelmed Arizona 42–17. Quarterback Andrew Luck threw for 293 yards and two touchdowns, and receiver Chris Owusu caught 9 passes for 165 yards and a touchdown. The Cardinal defense, meanwhile, intercepted Arizona quarterback Nick Foles and held the Wildcats to 3 points in the first half. Though they allowed two late touchdowns, Stanford answered each on its next possession with a long drive that culminated in a touchdown run from Stepfan Taylor.

=== Arizona State ===
Arizona State at #7 Stanford

Team	1	2	3	4	Total
Sun Devils	7	0	6	0	13
• No. 7 Cardinal	7	0	3	7	17

- Location: Stanford Stadium

With its usually explosive offense held in check by the Sun Devils, the Cardinal relied on their defense to keep the game close until a fourth-quarter drive put them on top of the Sun Devils, 17–13. After scoring on its first drive, the Stanford rushing game was held to 128 yards on 42 carries. Quarterback Andrew Luck fumbled and threw an interception, but had enough left to engineer a fourth-quarter drive finished with an Owen Marecic one-yard touchdown plunge. Stanford moved to 9–1 on the year, its best start since 1951.

=== At California ===
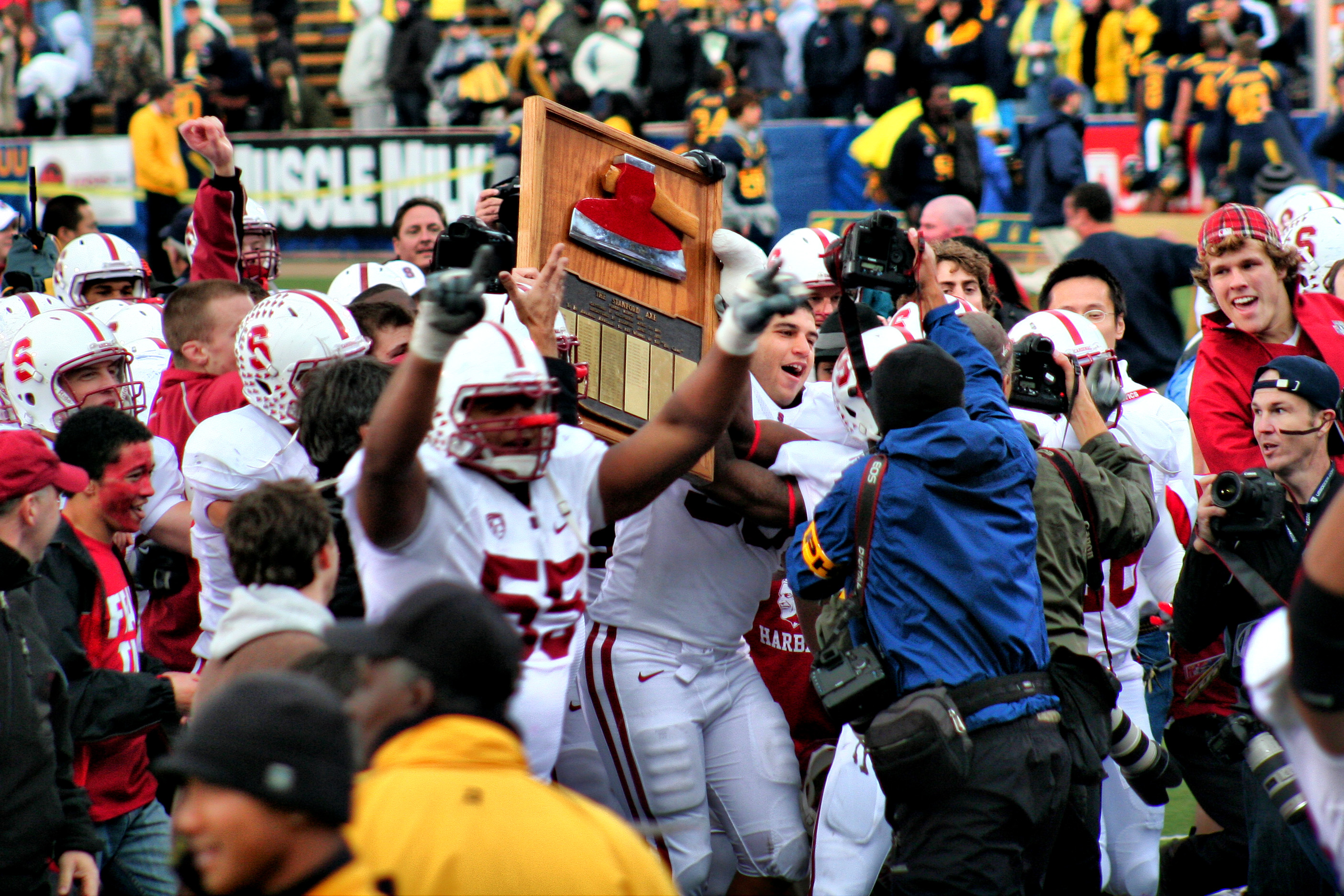
Stanford players lift the Stanford Axe after winning the 2010 Big Game against the California Golden Bears.

#7 Stanford at California

Team	1	2	3	4	Total
• No. 7 Cardinal	10	21	14	3	48
Golden Bears	0	0	0	14	14

- Date: November 20
- Location: Memorial Stadium
- Game attendance: 67,793
- Television network: FSN

Scoring summary
1	12:20	STAN	Nate Whitaker 29-yard field goal	STAN 3–0
1	3:46	STAN	Stepfan Taylor 3-yard run (Whitaker kick)	STAN 10–0
2	10:44	STAN	Stepfan Taylor 1-yard run (Whitaker kick)	STAN 17–0
2	2:47	STAN	Zach Ertz 13-yard pass from Andrew Luck (Whitaker kick)	STAN 24–0
2	0:22	STAN	Doug Baldwin 29-yard pass from Andrew Luck (Whitaker kick)	STAN 31–0
3	12:09	STAN	Stepfan Taylor 4-yard run (Whitaker kick)	STAN 38–0
3	4:53	STAN	Anthony Wilkerson 3-yard run (Whitaker kick)	STAN 45–0
4	14:27	CAL	Keenan Allen 17-yard pass from QB (Giorgio Tavecchio kick)	STAN 45–7
4	7:04	STAN	Nate Whitaker 40-yard field goal	STAN 48–7
4	0:15	CAL	Brock Mansion pass complete to Keenan Allen for a loss of 3 yards, lateral to Isi Sofele for 15 yards (Tavecchio kick)	STAN 48–14

Andrew Luck led the Cardinal to scores on all eight possessions in which he participated—including three touchdown drives of more than 80 yards—as the Cardinal cruised to a 48–14 victory, its most lopsided victory in the Big Game since 1930, when Stanford shut out California 41–0. Luck was 16 of 20 for 235 yards and 2 touchdown passes. Stepfan Taylor scored on three short touchdown runs, but Luck was Stanford's leading rusher with 72 yards, 58 of which came on a broken play in which he stiff-armed a Cal defender and continued for another 20 yards. Stanford's 48 points tied with Cal's 1975 total for the most points scored by either team in 113 Big Games. Both Bears touchdowns came on fourth-quarter trick plays: a pass from receiver Keenan Allen to Marvin Jones, and with 15 seconds left in the game, an Allen lateral to Isi Sofele. Stanford remains in contention for an at-large BCS berth while the Golden Bears need one more win to attain of bowl-eligibility.

=== Oregon State ===
Oregon State at #7 Stanford

Team	1	2	3	4	Total
Beavers	0	0	0	0	0
• No. 7 Cardinal	14	10	7	7	38

- Date: November 27
- Location: Stanford Stadium
- Television network: Versus

Scoring summary
1	9:38	STAN	Zach Ertz 21-yard pass from Andrew Luck (Nate Whitaker kick)	STAN 7–0
1	2:21	STAN	Doug Baldwin 42-yard pass from Andrew Luck (Whitaker kick)	STAN 14–0
2	8:08	STAN	Nate Whitaker 20-yard field goal	STAN 17–0
2	1:56	STAN	Doug Baldwin 29-yard pass from Andrew Luck (Whitaker kick)	STAN 24–0
3	5:16	STAN	Stepfan Taylor 62-yard run (Whitaker kick)	STAN 31–0
4	14:50	STAN	Tyler Gaffney 52-yard pass from Andrew Luck (Whitaker kick)	STAN 38–0

The Cardinal closed out its best-ever regular season at home with a 38–0 victory over the Beavers. Andrew Luck threw four touchdown passes for a total of 28 on the year, setting a new Stanford single-season record, and surpassing John Elway and Steve Stenstrom. Meanwhile, the Stanford defense intercepted Beavers quarterback Ryan Katz three times and sacked him four times, one of which resulted in a fumble recovered by the Cardinal. The shutout was Stanford's third of the season and Oregon State's first since 2002. Coupled with losses by Boise State and LSU, the win moved Stanford to #4 in the BCS standings, a position which would assure them an at-large bid in a BCS bowl for the first time (Stanford last won an automatic BCS bid to the 2000 Rose Bowl).

=== Orange Bowl ===
FedEx Orange Bowl
#5 Stanford vs. #12 Virginia Tech

Team	1	2	3	4	Total
• No. 5 Cardinal	7	6	13	14	40
No. 12 Hokies	2	10	0	0	12

- Date: January 3
- Location: Sun Life Stadium
- Game attendance: 65,453
- Referee: Tom Walker
- TV announcers (ESPN): Mike Tirico, Ron Jaworski, Jon Gruden, Michele Tafoya

Scoring summary
1	6:16	STAN	Jeremy Stewart 60-yard run (Whitaker kick)	STAN 7–0
1	0:59	VT	Safety, Derek Hall tackled in end zone	STAN 7–2
2	10:22	VT	David Wilson 11-yard pass from Tyrod Taylor (Chris Hazley kick)	VT 9–7
2	6:32	STAN	Zach Ertz 25-yard pass from Andrew Luck (kick blocked)	STAN 13–9
2	0:03	VT	Chris Hazley 37-yard field goal	STAN 13–12
3	8:47	STAN	Owen Marecic 1-yard run (Whitaker kick failed)	STAN 19–12
3	5:49	STAN	Coby Fleener 41-yard pass from Andrew Luck (Whitaker kick)	STAN 26–12
4	12:28	STAN	Coby Fleener 58-yard pass from Andrew Luck (Whitaker kick)	STAN 33–12
4	6:05	STAN	Coby Fleener 38-yard pass from Andrew Luck (Whitaker kick)	STAN 40–12

Andrew Luck threw four touchdown passes, three to Coby Fleener and one to Zach Ertz, to defeat the Hokies to finish the season with 12 wins and the first BCS bowl victory in program history.

== Awards and honors ==
- September 13 – Cornerback Mike Thomas was named Pac-10 Defensive Player of the Week.
- September 27 – Placekicker Nate Whitaker was named Pac-10 Special Teams Player of the Week.
- November 8 – Quarterback Andrew Luck was named Pac-10 Offensive Player of the Week.
- November 17 – Fullback/linebacker Owen Marecic has been named a first-team selection on the Pac-10 All-Academic Football Team. Earlier this month, he was named National Football Foundation Scholar-Athlete Award winner and is a finalist for the William V. Campbell Trophy, known as the academic Heisman.
- November 22 – Quarterback Andrew Luck was named Pac-10 Offensive Player of the Week.
- November 29 – Linebacker Chase Thomas was named Pac-10 Defensive Player of the Week
- January 10, 2011 – Owen Marecic was named Paul Hornung Award winner, the most versatile player.
