= Owen Marecic =

American football player (born 1988)

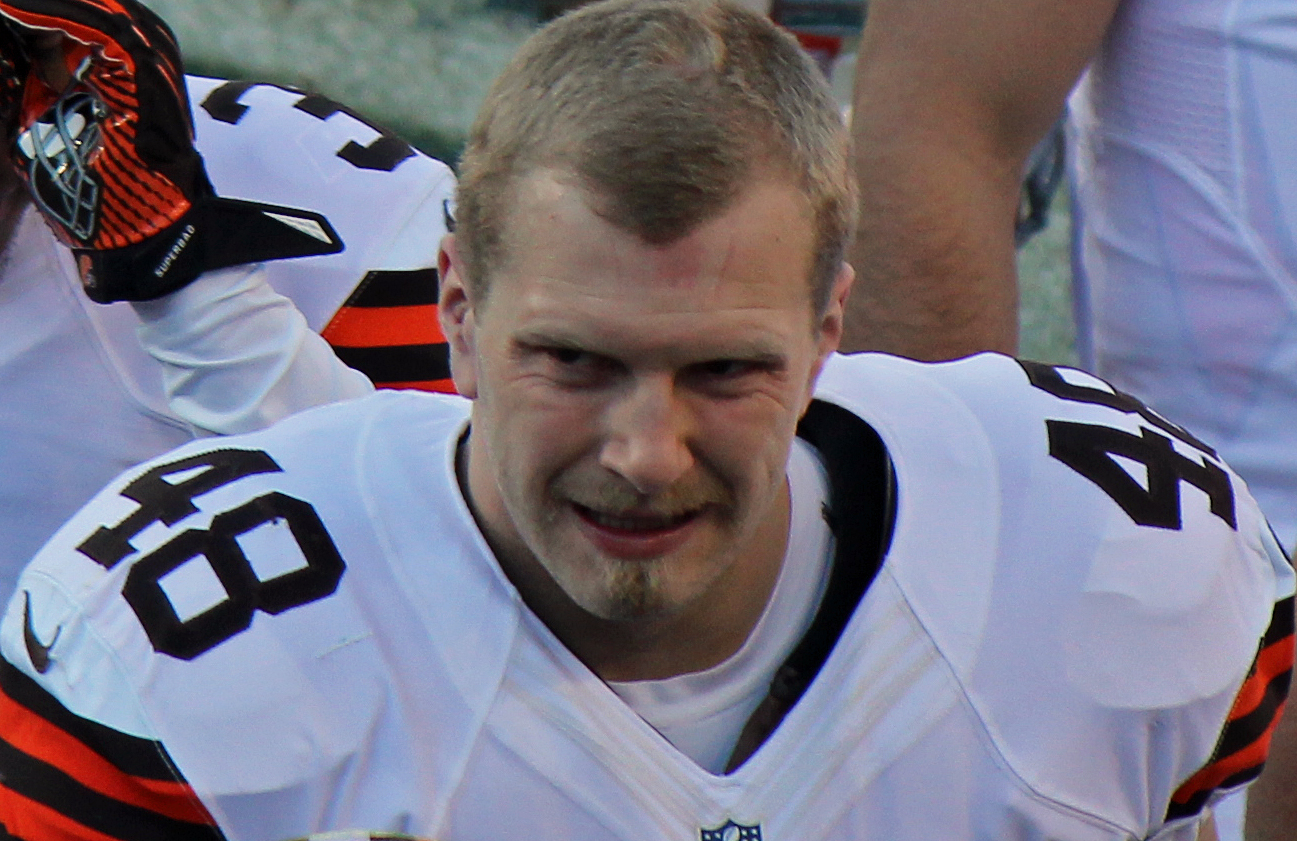
- Marecic with the Cleveland Browns in 2012

No. 48
- Position: Fullback

Personal information
- Born: October 4, 1988 (age 38); Agoura Hills, California, U.S.
- Listed height: 6 ft 0 in (1.83 m)
- Listed weight: 245 lb (111 kg)

Career information
- High school: Jesuit (Beaverton, Oregon)
- College: Stanford (2007–2010)
- NFL draft: 2011: 4th round, 124th overall pick

Career history
- Cleveland Browns (2011–2012); San Francisco 49ers (2013)

Awards and highlights
- Paul Hornung Award (2010); First-team All-American (2010); First-team All-Pac-10 (2010)

Career NFL statistics
- Rushing yards: 8
- Rushing average: 2
- Receptions: 5
- Receiving yards: 31
- Stats at Pro Football Reference

Owen Marecic (/məˈriːsɪk/ mə-REE-sik; born October 4, 1988) is an American former professional football player who was a fullback for the Cleveland Browns of the National Football League (NFL). He played college football for the Stanford Cardinal. As a senior in 2010, he played as both a fullback and a linebacker, earning first-team All-American honors as an all-purpose player. Marecic was selected by Cleveland in the fourth round of the 2011 NFL draft.

== Early life ==
Marecic moved with his family around the United States following his father's career as an IT executive. After New Jersey and Boston, where he played Pop Warner for the Westford/Littleton Lions, the Marecics moved to the Los Angeles area, where Owen played quarterback for a Pop Warner football team in Agoura Hills coached by former NFL player Clay Matthews. One of his Pop Warner teammates was the coach's son, former Philadelphia Eagles linebacker Casey Matthews. The Marecics moved to Tigard, Oregon, when Owen was a sophomore in high school where he enrolled at Jesuit High School. Marecic played fullback and linebacker for Jesuit, helping the team to Oregon state football titles his junior and senior years.

== College career ==
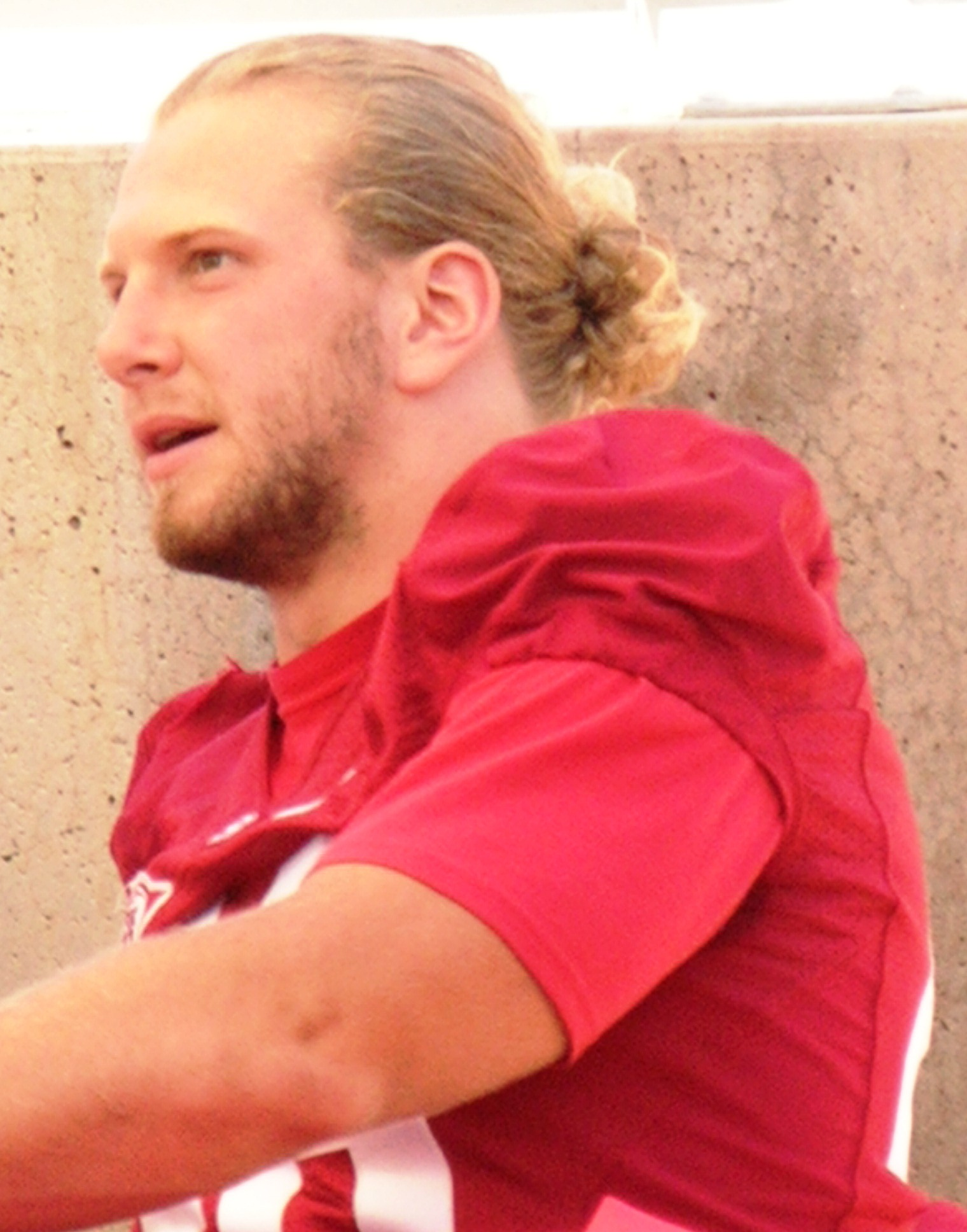
Marecic at Stanford in August 2010

Marecic was recruited by Army, Yale, and Stanford, eventually opting to attend Stanford. In his first three seasons with the Cardinal, Marecic was used primarily as a fullback, blocking for Toby Gerhart. He was an excellent blocking fullback, and seldom carried the ball. In his junior year Marecic was brought in as an inside linebacker in short yardage situations. In his senior season of 2010, Marecic's part-time linebacker assignment became full-time, a decision the coaching staff made reluctantly out of necessity. They later praised his conditioning for the challenge of participating in so many full-contact plays—including over 100 in a single game—through yoga, stretching, meditation before switching positions, and a thorough academic understanding of the difficulties as a human biology major. He was the only player in the Football Bowl Subdivision to start on both offense (at fullback) and defense (at inside linebacker). In the fourth game of the season against Notre Dame, Marecic scored a pair of touchdowns within 13 seconds of one another, first as a fullback on a short dive play, then 13 seconds later making an interception from his inside linebacker position, running it back for a score. In doing so he became the first player to score touchdowns on both offense and defense in the same game since Eric Weddle in 2006.

On January 10, 2011, he was named the inaugural winner of the Paul Hornung Award as the most versatile player in college football. Marecic also finished in 10th place for the 2010 Heisman Trophy, receiving 3 first place votes.

=== College statistics ===
Source:		Tackles					Interceptions				Rushing				Receiving				Scrimmage			
Year	G	Solo	Ast	Tot	Loss	Sk	Int	Yds	Avg	TD	Att	Yds	Avg	TD	Rec	Yds	Avg	TD	Plays	Yds	Avg	TD
2007	12	0	0	0	0	0	0	0	0	0	5	6	1.2	0	4	26	6.5	0	9	32	3.6	0
2008	11	1	1	2	0	0	0	0	0	0	0	0	0	0	4	25	6.3	0	4	25	6.3	0
2009	13	1	1	2	0	0	0	0	0	0	8	15	1.9	4	8	132	16.5	1	16	147	9.2	5
2010	13	30	21	51	5.5	2	2	39	19.5	1	23	46	2	5	9	75	8.3	0	32	121	3.8	5
Career	0	32	23	55	5.5	2	2	39	19.5	1	36	67	1.9	9	25	258	10.3	1	61	325	5.3	10

== Professional career ==
Pre-draft measurables
Height	Weight	Arm length	Hand span	Wingspan	40-yard dash	10-yard split	20-yard split	20-yard shuttle	Three-cone drill	Vertical jump	Broad jump	Bench press
6 ft 0 1/2 in (1.84 m)	248 lb (112 kg)	32 5/8 in (0.83 m)	9 1/8 in (0.23 m)	6 ft 4 3/4 in (1.95 m)	4.73 s	1.68 s	2.65 s	4.50 s	7.10 s	32.0 in (0.81 m)	8 ft 11 in (2.72 m)	22 reps
All values from NFL Combine/Pro Day

=== Cleveland Browns ===
On April 30, 2011, Marecic was selected in the 4th round by the Cleveland Browns with the 124th pick in the 2011 NFL draft. This was one of four picks the Browns acquired by trading their own first-round pick to the Atlanta Falcons; the Falcons drafted future pro-bowler Julio Jones, while the Browns drafted Phil Taylor (DT), Greg Little (WR), Marecic, and Brandon Weeden (QB) and have since been widely criticized. He was projected to play at fullback rather than linebacker. The Browns were reportedly impressed with his work ethic and approach to the game.

Marecic made the Browns roster, contributing in 2011 primarily as a blocking back for running backs Peyton Hillis and Montario Hardesty. He was cut by the Browns on August 27, 2013.

=== San Francisco 49ers ===
On September 17, 2013, the 49ers signed Marecic to a one-year contract. Marecic had played at Stanford under then-49ers coach Jim Harbaugh. He was released on October 1, 2013, without playing in a game for the 49ers.

== Post-football career ==
After leaving football, Marecic re-enrolled at San Francisco State University to finish pre-med requirements and worked at a medical research lab at Stanford, in preparation for medical school. As a researcher, he has contributed to two published articles in the Journal of Visualized Experiments. Marecic graduated from the Stanford University School of Medicine in 2021 and is currently completing his residency in orthopedic surgery at Stanford University Medical Center. He was inducted into the Jesuit High School Hall of Fame in 2024.
