= 2010 Pacific-10 Conference football season =

American college football season

- League: NCAA Division I FBS (Football Bowl Subdivision)
- Sport: football
- Duration: September 2, 2010 through January 10, 2011
- Teams: 10

2011 NFL Draft
- Top draft pick: QB Jake Locker, Washington
- Picked by: Tennessee Titans, 8th overall

Regular season
- Champion: Oregon Ducks
- Runners-up: Stanford Cardinal

Football seasons
- 2009 2011

2010 Pacific-10 Conference football standings
| | Conf. | | | Overall |
| Team | W | | L | W | | L |
|---|---|---|---|---|---|---|
| No. 3 Oregon $ | 9 | – | 0 | 12 | – | 1 |
| No. 4 Stanford % | 8 | – | 1 | 12 | – | 1 |
| USC † | 5 | – | 4 | 8 | – | 5 |
| Washington | 5 | – | 4 | 7 | – | 6 |
| Arizona | 4 | – | 5 | 7 | – | 6 |
| Arizona State | 4 | – | 5 | 6 | – | 6 |
| Oregon State | 4 | – | 5 | 5 | – | 7 |
| California | 3 | – | 6 | 5 | – | 7 |
| UCLA | 2 | – | 7 | 4 | – | 8 |
| Washington State | 1 | – | 8 | 2 | – | 10 |
$ – BCS representative as conference champion; % – BCS at-large representative; † – USC ineligible for championship and post-season due to NCAA sanctions; Rankings from AP Poll

The 2010 Pacific-10 Conference football season began on September 2, 2010 with a victory by USC at Hawaii. Conference play began on September 11 with Stanford shutting out UCLA 35–0 in Pasadena on ESPN.

Oregon repeated as the conference champion, ending the regular season with a program-first twelve wins and with a #2 BCS ranking. The Ducks earned a berth in the 2011 BCS National Championship Game, which they lost to SEC Champion Auburn. Stanford repeated as the conference runner-up, ending the regular season with a program-first eleven wins (their sole loss was to Oregon) and with a #4 BCS ranking, giving them an at-large BCS berth. The Cardinal defeated ACC Champion Virginia Tech in the 2011 Orange Bowl. Arizona lost to Oklahoma State while Washington defeated Nebraska in non-BCS bowls.

This was the final season for the conference as a 10-team league. In July 2011, Colorado and Utah joined the conference, at which time the league's name changed to the Pac-12 Conference. The Sagarin Ratings by the end of the bowl season, ranked the Pac-10 as the best conference in football, overall.

== Preseason ==
- March 12, 2010 – Coach Chip Kelly suspended quarterback Jeremiah Masoli for the 2010 season after he pleaded guilty to second-degree burglary charges.
- March 19, 2010 – Oregon athletic director Mike Bellotti steps down to join ESPN as a football analyst.
- June 9, 2010 – Oregon dismisses Masoli.
- June 10, 2010 – The NCAA releases the report of its investigation of the USC football team for violations dealing with former Trojans running back Reggie Bush. Sanctions imposed include loss of scholarships and include a two-year postseason ban
- June 10, 2010 – Colorado joins the Pac-10 as its 11th member effective July 1, 2012. (The school and its then-current conference, the Big 12, later reached an agreement in September 2010 to allow the Buffaloes to join the Pac-10 in 2011.)
- June 17, 2010 – Utah joins the Pac-10 as its 12th member effective July 1, 2011. Although they are the 12th member to accept an invitation to the conference, they are at the time believed to be the 11th member to compete since Colorado is not initially scheduled to join until 2012.
- July 1, 2010 – Running backs coach Todd McNair's contract at USC expired June 30, 2010. He played a key part in the NCAA's investigation of the school's athletic department in dealing with Reggie Bush.
- July 6, 2010 – Seantrel Henderson, the nation's No. 1-ranked offensive tackle recruit was given a release from his commitment to play with USC. Defensive end Malik Jackson transferred to Tennessee.
- July 29, 2010 – Annual media poll: 1. Oregon (314 points); 2. USC (311); 3. Oregon State (262); 4. Stanford (233); 5. Arizona (222); 6. Washington (209); 7. California (175); 8. UCLA (134); 9. Arizona State (81); 10. Washington State (39). Media day was held at the Rose Bowl.

== Rankings ==
Legend
| | Increase in ranking |
| | Decrease in ranking |
| | Not ranked previous week |
| NR | Not ranked in top 25 and received no votes |
| RV | Received votes, but not ranked in top 25 |

| | | Pre | Sept. 7 | Sept. 12 | Sept. 19 | Sept. 26 | Oct. 3 | Oct. 10 | Oct. 17 | Oct. 24 | Oct. 31 | Nov. 7 | Nov. 14 | Nov. 21 | Nov. 28 | Dec. 5 | Final |
|---|---|---|---|---|---|---|---|---|---|---|---|---|---|---|---|---|---|
| Arizona | AP | NR | NR | 24 | 14 | 14 | 9 | 17 | 15 | 15 | 13 | 18 | 23 | 20 | RV | NR | NR |
| Arizona | C | NR | 23 | 18 | 16 | 14 | 11 | 20 | 18 | 15 | 13 | 19 | 23 | 20 | RV | RV | NR |
| Arizona | BCS | Not released | | | | | | | 18 | 15 | 15 | 18 | 22 | 21 | 23 | NR | |
| Arizona State | AP | NR | NR | NR | NR | NR | NR | NR | NR | NR | NR | NR | NR | NR | NR | NR | NR |
| Arizona State | C | NR | NR | NR | NR | NR | NR | NR | NR | NR | NR | NR | NR | NR | NR | NR | NR |
| Arizona State | BCS | Not released | | | | | | | NR | NR | NR | NR | NR | NR | NR | NR | |
| California | AP | NR | NR | NR | NR | NR | NR | NR | NR | NR | NR | NR | NR | NR | NR | NR | NR |
| California | C | NR | NR | 24 | NR | NR | NR | NR | NR | NR | NR | NR | NR | NR | NR | NR | NR |
| California | BCS | Not released | | | | | | | NR | NR | NR | NR | NR | NR | NR | NR | |
| Oregon | AP | 11 | 7 | 5 | 5 | 4 | 3 | 2 | 1 | 1 | 1 | 1 | 1 | 1 | 1 | 2 | 3 |
| Oregon | C | 11 | 8 | 6 | 6 | 4 | 3 | 2 | 1 | 1 | 1 | 1 | 1 | 1 | 1 | 1 | 3 |
| Oregon | BCS | Not released | | | | | | | 2 | 2 | 1 | 1 | 1 | 1 | 2 | 2 | |
| Oregon State | AP | 24 | NR | 25 | 24 | RV | RV | 24 | RV | RV | NR | NR | NR | NR | NR | NR | NR |
| Oregon State | C | 22 | NR | NR | NR | NR | RV | RV | NR | NR | NR | NR | NR | NR | NR | NR | NR |
| Oregon State | BCS | Not released | | | | | | | NR | NR | NR | NR | NR | NR | NR | NR | |
| Stanford | AP | NR | 25 | 19 | 16 | 9 | 16 | 14 | 12 | 13 | 10 | 7 | 7 | 7 | 5 | 5 | 4 |
| Stanford | C | NR | NR | 19 | 17 | 13 | 18 | 15 | 14 | 14 | 12 | 9 | 8 | 8 | 5 | 5 | 4 |
| Stanford | BCS | Not released | | | | | | | 12 | 13 | 13 | 6 | 6 | 6 | 4 | 4 | |
| UCLA | AP | NR | NR | NR | NR | RV | RV | NR | NR | NR | NR | NR | NR | NR | NR | NR | NR |
| UCLA | C | NR | NR | NR | NR | RV | RV | NR | NR | NR | NR | NR | NR | NR | NR | NR | NR |
| UCLA | BCS | Not released | | | | | | | NR | NR | NR | NR | NR | NR | NR | NR | |
| USC | AP | 14 | 16 | 18 | 20 | 18 | NR | RV | NR | 24 | NR | NR | 20 | NR | NR | NR | NR |
| USC | C | Ineligible for ranking | | | | | | | | | | | | | | | |
| USC | BCS | Not released | | | | | | | Ineligible for ranking | | | | | | | | |
| Washington | AP | NR | NR | NR | NR | NR | NR | NR | RV | NR | NR | NR | NR | NR | NR | NR | NR |
| Washington | C | NR | NR | NR | NR | NR | NR | NR | NR | NR | NR | NR | NR | NR | NR | NR | RV |
| Washington | BCS | Not released | | | | | | | NR | NR | NR | NR | NR | NR | NR | NR | |
| Washington State | AP | NR | NR | NR | NR | NR | NR | NR | NR | NR | NR | NR | NR | NR | NR | NR | NR |
| Washington State | C | NR | NR | NR | NR | NR | NR | NR | NR | NR | NR | NR | NR | NR | NR | NR | NR |
| Washington State | BCS | Not released | | | | | | | NR | NR | NR | NR | NR | NR | NR | NR | |

== Highlights ==
=== September ===
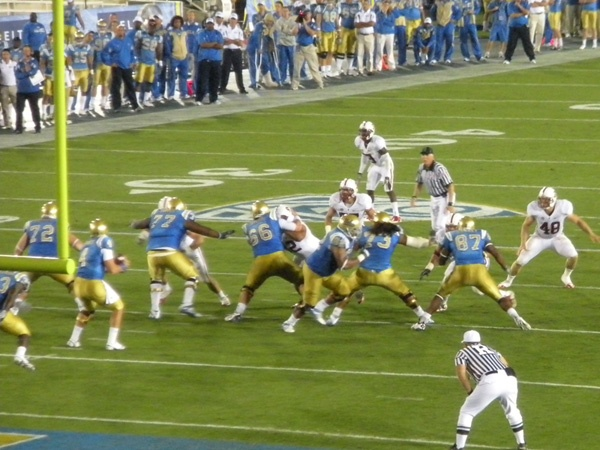
Michael Thomas (top) was Player of the Week for the Stanford Cardinal in the conference opener against UCLA

- September 11 – In the first conference game of the season, #25 Stanford defeated UCLA in a 35–0 shut out at the Rose Bowl, marking several firsts: the Cardinal's first victory in Pasadena since 1996, the first home shut out UCLA had suffered since an October 16, 1999, 17–0 loss to California, the first time Stanford had shut out an opponent on the road since 1974, and the first time since 1941 that Stanford shut out UCLA.
- September 17 – In a matchup between the number one defense in the nation in Cal and the number one offense in the nation in Nevada, the Bears fell to the Wolf Pack 52–31 in Reno in the teams' first meeting since 1915.
- September 18 – Oregon records two shutouts in a season for the first time since 1964 with a 69–0 blowout of Portland State and a 72–0 shut out of New Mexico in its September 4 season opener. Two Pac-10 teams upset their opponents: UCLA defeated No. 23 Houston in the Rose Bowl for the Bruins' first win against a ranked opponent since 2008 and Arizona defeated No. 10 Iowa at home, scoring the most points allowed so far by the Hawkeyes in the season.
- September 19 – Five Pac-10 teams are ranked in the Top 25 (#5 Oregon, #14 Arizona, #16 Stanford, #20 USC, #24 Oregon State).
- September 21 – Colorado and the Big 12 Conference reach an agreement that will allow the Buffaloes to join the Pac-10 in 2011.
- September 25 – UCLA pulls off its second upset in a row of a ranked opponent with a 34–12 defeat of No. 7 Texas in front of a stadium-record crowd of 101,437 in Austin. Stanford wins at Notre Dame for the first time since 1992. No. 14 Arizona survives a scare in Tucson with a late touchdown and interception against Cal to hold on and prevent an upset in both teams' Pac-10 openers. Four Pac-10 teams (#4 Oregon, #9 Stanford, #14 Arizona, #18 USC) are 4–0.

=== October ===
- October 2 – #9 Stanford visited #4 Oregon in a game that could decide the Pac-10 championship in their first meeting as ranked teams. The Ducks rallied to come from behind 21–3 and defeat the Cardinal. Washington upset #18 USC for two consecutive years, winning at the Los Angeles Memorial Coliseum 32–31 with a last-second field goal.
- October 9 – #3 Oregon remains the sole undefeated Pac-10 team at 6–0 with a victory over Washington State. Oregon State upsets #9 Arizona 29–27 in Tucson. Cal snaps a 3-game winning streak by UCLA with a 35–7 rout in Berkeley. #16 Stanford defeats USC 37–35 for the Trojans' second loss in a row on a last-second field goal.
- October 16 – USC quarterback Matt Barkley throws a school record-tying five touchdowns in a 48–14 blowout victory over Cal. Cal has won three games (all at home) by the margin of 139–17 and lost three games (all on the road) 110–54. Washington upsets #24 Oregon State in 35–34 in double overtime, snapping a six-game losing streak to the Beavers. Both teams were tied at 21 points apiece at the end of regulation.
- October 17 – Oregon earns a #1 ranking in the AP and Coaches' Polls and a #2 BCS ranking.
- October 21 – Oregon quarterback Darron Thomas throws for a career-high 308 yards in a 60–13 blowout of UCLA.
- October 23 – Stanford gets their sixth victory in seven games to open a season for the first time since 1970 with a victory over Washington State, becoming bowl-eligible for the second straight season since 1995–96. Cal defeats Arizona State 50–17, while #15 Arizona routs Washington 44–14.
- October 30 – Arizona State shuts out Washington State 42–0 and Washington is shut out at home for the first time since 1976 by No. 13 Stanford 41–0. No. 15 Arizona holds off UCLA to prevail 29–21, while Oregon State defeats Cal for the fourth time in a row, 35–7. Oregon running back LaMichael James sets a school record with his 15th career 100-yard rushing game and Darron Thomas becomes the first quarterback to throw 20 touchdown passes in a season since 2007 as #1 Oregon stays unbeaten with a 53–32 defeat of #24 USC.
- October 31 – Oregon is ranked first in the BCS, AP, and Coaches Polls.

=== November ===
- November 6 – Top-ranked Oregon fails to score in the first quarter for the first time in the season in a 53–16 rout of Washington. #10 Stanford dominates #13 Arizona in a 42–17 victory. USC edges out Arizona State 34–33 after a last minute Sun Devils field goal misses. UCLA defeats Oregon State 17–14 on a field goal with 1 second left in regulation. Cal holds off Washington State for its first road victory since the 2009 Big Game against Stanford.
- November 13 – Oregon is held scoreless in the first quarter for the second week in a row and held to a season-low 317 yards of offense, but holds off Cal for a 15–13 victory, the first game of the season where the Ducks did not score at least 42 points and win by at least 11 points. #7 Stanford edges out Arizona State 17–13. USC upsets #18 Arizona 24–21. Washington State snaps a 16-game conference losing streak by defeating Oregon State 31–14 in Corvallis.
- November 14 – Oregon holds its #1 rankings in all polls. Stanford holds its #7 ranking in the AP Poll and its #8 ranking in the Harris Polls while rising from #9 to #8 in the Coaches Poll. Arizona falls to #23 in all polls. USC returns to the AP rankings at #20. Three Pac-10 teams are bowl assured: Oregon, Stanford, and Arizona.
- November 18 – In its home finale, Washington has two 100-yard rushers for the first time since 2007 and puts up a season-high 253 yards rushing in a 24–7 defeat of UCLA.
- November 20 – #7 Stanford ties a 1975 Cal record for the most points in Big Game history to recapture the Stanford Axe from Cal in Berkeley, 48–14. Oregon State upsets #20 USC at Corvallis 36–7, the third consecutive victory for the Beavers over the Trojans in Oregon. They will have faced five Top 10 teams by the end of the year.
- November 26 – Arizona State tops UCLA 55–34. Wildcats quarterback Nick Foles passes for a career-high 448 yards, but his performance is not enough to stage an upset of #1 Oregon by #20 Arizona, as the Ducks prevail 48–29.
- November 27 – Washington keeps its bowl hopes alive by scoring a touchdown with 2 seconds left in the game in a matchup against Cal to prevail 16–13, ending Cal's bowl hopes. #6 Stanford has its first 11-game winning season in school history with a 38–0 shutout of Oregon State, its third conference shutout of the season. Notre Dame defeats USC 20–16 for its first win since 2001. Oregon moves down in the BCS rankings to #2, while Stanford moves up to #4.

=== December ===
- December 2 – Arizona State blocks two PATs to defeat Arizona in double overtime 30–29 in their annual Territorial Cup game.
- December 3 – The NCAA denies Arizona State's request for a waiver to play in a post-season bowl game.
- December 4 – Oregon repeats as the conference champion with a victory over Oregon State in the Civil War to finish with 12 wins for the first time in program history. USC defeats UCLA for the fourth straight time to hold on to the Victory Bell. Washington defeats Washington State in the Apple Cup on a game-winning touchdown with 44 seconds left in the game to become bowl-eligible for the first time since 2001.
- December 5 – Auburn moves past Oregon for the #1 AP Ranking. The two teams will meet in the BCS National Championship Game. #5 Stanford won an at-large BCS berth and will face ACC Champion Virginia Tech in the Orange Bowl, Arizona will face #16 Oklahoma State in the Alamo Bowl, and Washington will face #17 Nebraska in the Holiday Bowl.
- December 6 – Two of the four finalists for the Heisman Trophy represent the Pac-10: Oregon running back LaMichael James and Stanford quarterback Andrew Luck. This is the second year in a row that Stanford has had a Heisman Trophy finalist. Oregon head coach Chip Kelly is named the Eddie Robinson Coach of the Year by the Football Writers Association of America.
- December 9 – Oregon running back LaMichael James is the recipient of the Doak Walker Award, the second year in a row that a Pac-10 running back has received the award.
- December 11 – Stanford quarterback Andrew Luck is the runner-up in Heisman Trophy balloting to Auburn quarterback Cameron Newton, the second year in a row that a Stanford player is the runner-up in balloting for the Heisman.
- December 21 – Oregon head coach Chip Kelly is named the Associated Press College Football Coach of the Year. Stanford's Jim Harbaugh finished third in balloting.

== Notes ==
- USC is ineligible for the postseason due to sanctions imposed by the NCAA
- USC kicked off the Pac-10 football season by visiting Hawai'i on Thursday, September 2, 2010.
- The Pac-10 football season ends with games on Saturday, December 4, 2010
- January 6, 2011 – Fox signed a contract to air the first Pac-12 Conference football championship game on December 3, 2011 for $14.5 million.

== Statistics leaders ==
| Team | School | Record |
|---|---|---|
| Scoring offense | Oregon | 592 points, 49.3 average |
| Rushing offense | Oregon | 3,646 yards (597 attempts), 303.8 yards per game |
| Scoring defense | Stanford | 214 points, 17.8 average |
| Rushing defense | Oregon | 1,411 yards, 11 TDs, 117.6 yards per game |
| Pass offense | Arizona | 325 of 474 passes (68.6%), 9 interceptions, 24 TDs, 310.0 yards per game |
| Total offense | Oregon | 3,646 yards rushing, 2,804 passing, 71 TDs, 537.5 yards per game |

== Players-of-the-week ==
National

- September 13 – Cal linebacker Mike Mohamed was named Lott IMPACT Player of the Week.
- September 21 – UCLA linebacker Patrick Larimore, who had a career-high and team-high 11 tackles (10 solos), including three for loss, forced a fumble and broke up a pass in the upset of No. 23 Houston on September 18 was named the FWAA/Bronko Nagurski National Defensive Player of the Week.
- September 27 – UCLA linebacker Akeem Ayers was named Lott IMPACT Player of the Week. The UCLA Bruins (2–2) are the Tostitos Fiesta Bowl National Team of the Week for games of the weekend of September 25.

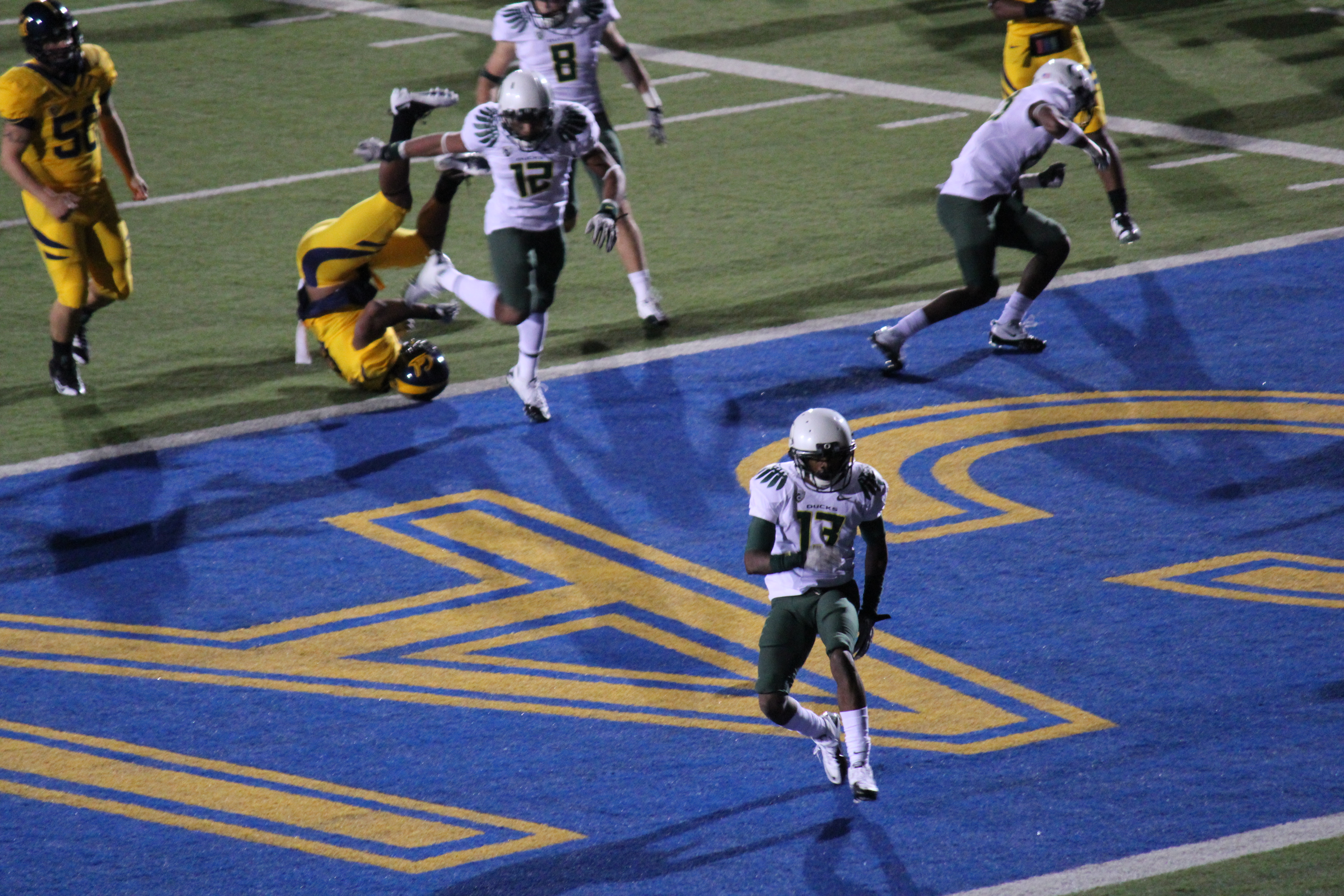
Oregon punt returner Cliff Harris scores on a 64-yard punt return against California on November 13 to earn Player of the Week honors.

Pacific-10 Conference

| Week | Offensive | | Defensive | | Special teams | |
| Week | Player | Team | Player | Team | Player | Team |
|---|---|---|---|---|---|---|
| 1 – September 7 | Kenjon Barner, RB | ORE | Lance Mitchell, S | OSU | Cliff Harris, PR | ORE |
| 2 – September 13 | Jermaine Kearse, WR | WASH | Mike Thomas, CB | STAN | Jackson Rice, P | ORE |
| 3 – September 20 | Nick Foles, QB | ARIZ | Patrick Larimore, LB | UCLA | Travis Cobb, KR | ARIZ |
| 4 – September 27 | Ryan Taylor, C | UCLA | Sean Westgate, LB | UCLA | Nate Whitaker, PK | STAN |
| 5 – October 4 | LaMichael James, RB | ORE | Cliff Harris, CB | ORE | Erik Folk, PK | WASH |
| 6 – October 11 | Ryan Katz, QB | OSU | Darian Hagan, CB | CAL | Bryan Anger, P | CAL |
| 7 – October 18 | Matt Barkley, QB | USC | Shaquille Richardson, CB | ARIZ | Joe Houston, PK | USC |
| 8 – October 25 | Matt Scott, QB | ARIZ | Paul Vassallo, LB | ARIZ | Keenan Allen, KR | CAL |
| 9 – Nov. 1 | Jeff Maehl, WR | ORE | Junior Onyeali, DE | ASU | Jake Fischer, LB | ARIZ |
| 10 – Nov. 8 | Andrew Luck, QB | STAN | T. J. McDonald, S | USC | Kai Forbath, PK | UCLA |
| 11 – Nov. 15 | Jeff Tuel, QB | WSU | Mike Mohamed, LB | CAL | Cliff Harris, PR | ORE |
| 12 – Nov. 22 | Andrew Luck, QB | Stanford | Stephen Paea, DT | OSU | Justin Kahut, PK | OSU |
| 13 – Nov. 29 | Brock Osweiler, QB | ASU | Chase Thomas, LB | STAN | Jamal Miles, KR | ASU |
| 14 – Dec. 6 | Chris Polk, RB | WASH | James Brooks, DE | ASU | Thomas Weber, PK | ASU |

== Pac-10 vs. BCS matchups ==
| Date | Visitor | Home | Winning team | Notes |
|---|---|---|---|---|
| September 4 | UCLA | Kansas State | Kansas State | Kansas State rushes for 315 yards, its highest rushing total since 2002, before the largest season-opening crowd in school history. Daniel Thomas has 234 yards rushing, the most by a Wildcats running back since 2004. |
| September 4 | Washington State | Oklahoma State | Oklahoma State | Washington State's worst season opening loss since 1967. Oklahoma State scores the most points in the 65–17 victory since 2006. |
| September 11 | Colorado | California | California | The teams' first meeting since 1982. |
| September 11 | Oregon | Tennessee | Oregon | Oregon scores the most points by a Tennessee opponent since 2007 and most by a nonconference opponent since 1988. |
| September 11 | Virginia | USC | USC | The teams' first meeting since 2008. Virginia's first game ever played in California. |
| September 11 | Syracuse | Washington | Washington | |
| September 18 | Iowa | Arizona | Arizona | The teams' first meeting since 1998. Iowa allowed a kick return for a touchdown for the first time since 2001 while Arizona committed the most penalties since 2005. |
| September 18 | Arizona State | Wisconsin | Wisconsin | Wisconsin blocked a PAT to hold on and prevent an upset. |
| September 18 | Louisville | Oregon State | Oregon State | Oregon State wins its ninth straight home opener in the first meeting between the two teams since 2005. |
| September 18 | Wake Forest | Stanford | Stanford | Wake Forest's first ever game in the state of California. The 68–24 win is Stanford's biggest point total since 1923. |
| September 18 | USC | Minnesota | USC | The teams' first meeting since 1980. Minnesota quarterback Adam Weber becomes the Golden Gophers' career touchdown pass leader. |
| September 18 | Nebraska | Washington | Nebraska | Nebraska quarterback Taylor Martinez records the longest touchdown run by a freshman in Nebraska history. |
| September 25 | Stanford | Notre Dame | Stanford | Stanford goes 4–0 for the first time since 1986. |
| September 25 | UCLA | Texas | UCLA | UCLA's first road victory against a ranked opponent since 2001 and Texas scores the fewest points at home since 2006 in the teams' first meeting since 1997. |
| November 27 | Notre Dame | USC | Notre Dame | Notre Dame's first victory over USC since 2001. |

== Bowl games ==
All bowl games involving the Pac-10 aired on ESPN.

| Bowl | Date | Winner* | Score | Loser* | Score | Location | Time^{+} | Pac-10's Record | Notes |
|---|---|---|---|---|---|---|---|---|---|
| Alamo Bowl | Dec. 29, 2010 | #16 Oklahoma State | 36 | **Arizona** | 10 | San Antonio, Texas | 6:00 p.m. | 0–1 | The teams' first meeting since 1942; Oklahoma State's record fifth straight bowl appearance and Arizona's third straight bowl appearance, matching a streak from 1992 to 1994; the Cowboys finish the season for the first time with 11 wins, while the Wildcats end their season with a fifth straight loss |
| Holiday Bowl | Dec. 30, 2010 | **Washington** | 19 | #17 Nebraska | 7 | San Diego, California | 7:00 p.m. | 1–1 | A rematch of both teams, when Nebraska defeated Washington 56–21 on September 18; Nebraska's second straight appearance in the Holiday Bowl and Washington's fourth Holiday Bowl appearance; Nebraska's upset marks Washington's first bowl victory since 2002 |
| Orange Bowl | Jan. 3, 2011 | #5 **Stanford** | 40 | #12 Virginia Tech | 12 | Miami Gardens, Florida | 5:00 p.m. | 2–1 | The teams' first meeting; Virginia Tech's fourth appearance in the Orange Bowl; Stanford's first bowl win since 1996 and the first BCS bowl victory in program history |
| BCS National Championship Game | Jan. 10, 2011 | #1 Auburn | 22 | #2 **Oregon** | 19 | Glendale, Arizona | 5:30 p.m. | 2–2 | The first title game appearance for either team and their first meeting; the SEC's fifth straight national championship victory |
*Pac-10 team is **bolded**. ^{+}Time given is Pacific Time

== Head coaches ==
- Mike Stoops, Arizona
- Dennis Erickson, Arizona State
- Jeff Tedford, California
- Chip Kelly, Oregon
- Mike Riley, Oregon State
- Jim Harbaugh, Stanford
- Rick Neuheisel, UCLA
- Lane Kiffin, USC
- Steve Sarkisian, Washington
- Paul Wulff, Washington State

== Awards and honors ==
Eddie Robinson Coach of the Year and Associated Press College Football Coach of the Year

- Chip Kelly, Oregon

Woody Hayes Trophy

- Jim Harbaugh, Stanford

Doak Walker Award

- LaMichael James, RB, Oregon

Paul Hornung Award

- Owen Marecic, FB and LB, Stanford.

National Finalists

- Akeem Ayers, LB, UCLA, Butkus Award (most outstanding defensive player)
- LaMichael James, RB, Oregon, Heisman Trophy (most outstanding player) and Doak Walker Award (most outstanding running back)
- Andrew Luck, QB, Stanford, Heisman Trophy, Maxwell Award (best player), and Davey O'Brien Award (best quarterback)
- Owen Marecic, FB/LB, Stanford, William V. Campbell Trophy (top scholar-athlete)
- Mike Mohamed, LB, California, William V. Campbell Trophy

=== All-Americans ===
Walter Camp Football Foundation All-America:

- Running back LaMichael James, Oregon, first team All-America
- Quarterback Andrew Luck, Stanford, second team All-America
- Center Chase Beeler, Stanford, second team All-America
- Linebacker Akeem Ayers, UCLA, second-team All-America
- Defensive back Cliff Harris, Oregon, second-team All-America
- Kick returner Cliff Harris, Oregon, second-team All-America

Associated Press All-America First Team:

- RB LaMichael James, Oregon
- OL Chase Beeler, Stanford
- DT Stephen Paea, Oregon State

FWAA All-America Team:

Sporting News All-America team:

- RB LaMichael James, Soph., Oregon, Offense first-team
- OL Chase Beeler, Sr., Stanford, Offense first-team
- DT Stephen Paea, Sr., Oregon State, Defense first-team
- LB Vontaze Burfict, Soph., Arizona State, Defense first-team
- S Rahim Moore, Jr., UCLA, Defense first-team
- PR Cliff Harris, Soph., Oregon, Defense first-team

AFCA Coaches' All-Americans First Team:

ESPN All-America team:

=== All-Pac-10 teams ===
- Offensive Player of the Year: Andrew Luck, QB, Stanford
- Pat Tillman Defensive Player of the Year: Stephen Paea, DT, Oregon State
- Offensive Freshman of the Year: Robert Woods, WR, USC
- Defensive Freshman of the Year: Junior Onyeali, DE, Arizona State
- Coach of the Year: Chip Kelly, Oregon

First Team:

| Pos. | Name | Yr. | School | Pos. | Name | Yr. | School | Pos. | Name | Yr. | School |
|---|---|---|---|---|---|---|---|---|---|---|---|
| Offense | | | | Defense | | | | Specialists | | | |
| QB | Andrew Luck | So. | Stanford | DL | Jurrell Casey | Jr. | USC | PK | Nate Whitaker | Sr. | Stanford |
| RB | LaMichael James | So. | Oregon | DL | Cameron Jordan | Sr. | California | P | Bryan Anger | Jr. | California |
| RB | Owen Marecic | Sr. | Stanford | DL | Stephen Paea | Sr. | Oregon State | KOR | Robert Woods | Fr. | USC |
| RB | Jacquizz Rodgers | Jr. | Oregon State | DL | Brooks Reed | Sr. | Arizona | PR | Cliff Harris | So. | Oregon |
| WR | Juron Criner | Jr. | Arizona | LB | Akeem Ayers | Jr. | UCLA | ST | Chike Amajoyi | Sr. | Stanford |
| WR | Jeff Maehl | Sr. | Oregon | LB | Mason Foster | Sr. | Washington | | | | |
| TE | David Paulson | Jr. | Oregon | LB | Casey Matthews | Sr. | Oregon | | | | |
| OL | Chase Beeler | Sr. | Stanford | DB | Omar Bolden | Jr. | Arizona State | | | | |
| OL | David DeCastro | So. | Stanford | DB | Chris Conte | Sr. | California | | | | |
| OL | Jordan Holmes | Sr. | Oregon | DB | Talmadge Jackson | Sr. | Oregon | | | | |
| OL | Jonathan Martin | Jr. | Stanford | DB | Rahim Moore | Jr. | UCLA | | | | |
| OL | Tyron Smith | Jr. | USC | | | | | | | | |

ST=special teams player (not a kicker or returner)

=== All-Academic ===
First Team:

| Pos. | Name | School | Yr. | GPA | Major |
|---|---|---|---|---|---|
| QB | Steven Threet | Arizona State | Jr. | 3.82 | General Studies |
| RB | LaMichael James | Oregon | So. | 3.01 | Sociology |
| RB | Owen Marecic | Stanford | Sr. | 3.47 | Human Biology |
| WR | Jared Karstetter | Washington State | Jr. | 3.55 | Zoology |
| WR | Ryan Whalen | Stanford | Sr. | 3.53 | Science, Technology and Society |
| TE | David Paulson | Oregon (2) | Jr. | 3.66 | Business Administration |
| OL | Chase Beeler | Stanford (2) | Sr. | 3.68 | History |
| OL | Micah Hannam | Washington State (3) | Sr. | 3.58 | Civil Engineering |
| OL | Brendan Lopez | Washington | Jr. | 3.68 | Microbiology |
| OL | Chris Prummer | Washington State (2) | Sr. | 3.90 | Zoology |
| OL | Carson York | Oregon (2) | So. | 3.70 | Journalism-Advertising |
| DL | Dean DeLeone | Arizona State | Sr. | 3.41 | Communication |
| DL | Kevin Frahm | Oregon State (2) | Jr. | 3.25 | Political Science |
| DL | Kevin Kooyman | Washington State (2) | Sr. | 3.18 | Management & Operations |
| DL | Casey Hamlett | Washington State | Sr. | 3.77 | Management & Operations |
| LB | Cameron Collins | Oregon State (3) | Jr. | 3.48 | Finance |
| LB | Mike Mohamed | California (3) | Sr. | 3.43 | Business Administration |
| LB | Jake Fischer | Arizona | So. | 3.42 | Pre-Business |
| DB | Kyle McCartney | Washington State | So. | 3.87 | Entrepreneurship |
| DB | Chima Nwachukwu | Washington State (3) | Sr. | 3.85 | Political Science |
| DB | Taylor Skaufel | Stanford | Sr. | 3.43 | Science, Technology and Society |
| DB | Antdony Wilcox | Arizona | Sr. | 3.05 | Religious Studies |
| PK | John Bonano | Arizona | Jr. | 3.90 | Pre-Physiology |
| P | Jeff Locke | UCLA (2) | So. | 3.57 | Economics |
| ST | Danny Rees | UCLA | Sr. | 3.51 | History |

== 2011 NFL draft ==
| Round | Overall pick | NFL team | Player | Position | College |
|---|---|---|---|---|---|
| 1 | 8 | Tennessee Titans | Jake Locker | Quarterback | Washington |
| 1 | 9 | Dallas Cowboys | Tyron Smith | Offensive tackle | USC |
| 1 | 24 | New Orleans Saints | Cameron Jordan | Defensive end | California |
| 2 | 38 | Tennessee Titans | Akeem Ayers | Offensive linebacker | UCLA |
| 2 | 42 | Houston Texans | Brooks Reed | Defensive end | Arizona |
| 2 | 45 | Denver Broncos | Rahim Moore | Safety | UCLA |
| 2 | 53 | Chicago Bears | Stephen Paea | Defensive tackle | Oregon State |
| 2 | 56 | New England Patriots | Shane Vereen | Running back | California |
| 3 | 77 | Tennessee Titans | Jurrell Casey | Defensive tackle | USC |
| 3 | 84 | Tampa Bay Buccaneers | Mason Foster | Linebacker | Washington |
| 3 | 89 | San Diego Chargers | Shareece Wright | Defensive back | USC |
| 3 | 93 | Chicago Bears | Chris Conte | Defensive back | California |
| 3 | 97 | Green Bay Packers | Sione Fua | Defensive tackle | Stanford |
| 4 | 102 | Cleveland Browns | Jordan Cameron | Tight end | USC |
| 4 | 116 | Philadelphia Eagles | Casey Matthews | Linebacker | Oregon |
| 4 | 124 | Cleveland Browns | Owen Marecic | Fullback | Stanford |
| 5 | 140 | Kansas City Chiefs | Gabe Miller | Linebacker | Oregon State |
| 5 | 145 | Atlanta Falcons | Jacquizz Rodgers | Running back | Oregon State |
| 5 | 154 | Seattle Seahawks | Richard Sherman | Cornerback | Stanford |
| 6 | 167 | Cincinnati Bengals | Ryan Whalen | Wide receiver | Stanford |
| 6 | 182 | San Francisco 49ers | Ronald Johnson | Wide receiver | USC |
| 6 | 184 | Arizona Cardinals | David Carter | Defensive tackle | UCLA |
| 6 | 187 | Tampa Bay Buccaneers | Allen Bradford | Running back | USC |
| 6 | 189 | Denver Broncos | Mike Mohamed | Linebacker | California |
| 6 | 197 | Green Bay Packers | Ricky Elmore | Defensive end | Arizona |
| 6 | 203 | Carolina Panthers | Zachary Williams | Center | USC |
| 7 | 215 | Minnesota Vikings | D'Aundre Reed | Defensive end | Arizona |
| 7 | 233 | Green Bay Packers | Lawrence Guy | Defensive tackle | Arizona State |
| 7 | 240 | Philadelphia Eagles | Stanley Havili | Fullback | USC |
| 7 | 241 | Oakland Raiders | David Ausberry | Wide receiver | USC |
| 7 | 242 | Seattle Seahawks | Malcolm Smith | Linebacker | USC |
