= 2010 All-Pacific-10 Conference football team =

The 2010 All-Pacific-10 Conference football team consists of American football players chosen by various organizations for All-Pacific-10 Conference teams for the 2010 Pacific-10 Conference football season. The Oregon Ducks won the conference, posting a 9–0 conference record. Oregon then lost to SEC champion Auburn Tigers in the BCS National Championship game 22 to 19. Stanford quarterback Andrew Luck was voted Pac-10 Offensive Player of the Year. Oregon State defensive tackle Stephen Paea was voted Pat Tillman Pac-10 Defensive Player of the Year.

== Offensive selections ==
=== Quarterbacks ===
- Andrew Luck#, Stanford (Coaches-1)
- Darron Thomas, Oregon (Coaches-2)

=== Running backs ===
- LaMichael James, Oregon (Coaches-1)
- Owen Marecic, Stanford (Coaches-1)
- Jacquizz Rodgers, Oregon St. (Coaches-1)
- Johnathan Franklin, UCLA (Coaches-2)
- Chris Polk, Washington (Coaches-2)
- Shane Vereen, California (Coaches-2)

=== Wide receivers ===
- Juron Criner#, Arizona (Coaches-1)
- Jeff Maehl, Oregon (Coaches-1)
- Doug Baldwin, Stanford (Coaches-2)
- Jermaine Kearse, Washington (Coaches-2)

=== Tight ends ===
- David Paulson, Oregon (Coaches-1)
- Coby Fleener, Stanford (Coaches-2)

=== Linemen ===
- Jonathan Martin, Stanford (Coaches-1)
- David DeCastro, Stanford (Coaches-1)
- Chase Beeler, Stanford (Coaches-1)
- Jordan Holmes, Oregon (Coaches-1)
- Tyron Smith, USC (Coaches-1)
- Colin Baxter, Arizona (Coaches-2)
- Adam Grant, Arizona (Coaches-2)
- Alex Linnenkohl, Oregon St. (Coaches-2)
- Mitchell Schwartz, California (Coaches-2)
- Bo Thran, Oregon (Coaches-2)

== Defensive selections ==
=== Linemen ===
- Jurrell Casey, USC (Coaches-1)
- Cameron Jordan, California (Coaches-1)
- Stephen Paea, Oregon St. (Coaches-1)
- Brooks Reed, Arizona (Coaches-1)
- Brandon Bair, Oregon (Coaches-2)
- Ricky Elmore, Arizona (Coaches-2)
- Sione Fua, Stanford (Coaches-2)
- Kenny Rowe, Oregon (Coaches-2)

=== Linebackers ===
- Akeem Ayers, UCLA (Coaches-1)
- Mason Foster, Washington (Coaches-1)
- Casey Matthews, Oregon (Coaches-1)
- Vontaze Burfict, Arizona St. (Coaches-2)
- Mychal Kendricks, California (Coaches-2)
- Mike Mohamed, California (Coaches-2)

=== Backs ===
- Omar Bolden, Arizona St. (Coaches-1)
- Chris Conte, California (Coaches-1)
- Talmadge Jackson, Oregon (Coaches-1)
- Rahim Moore, UCLA (Coaches-1)
- Cliff Harris, Oregon (Coaches-2)
- Delano Howell, Stanford (Coaches-2)
- T. J. McDonald, USC (Coaches-2)
- Nate Williams, Washington (Coaches-2)

== Special teams ==
=== Placekickers ===
- Nate Whitaker, Stanford (Coaches-1)
- Kai Forbath, UCLA (Coaches-2)

=== Punters ===
- Bryan Anger, California (Coaches-1)
- Jeff Locke, UCLA (Coaches-2)

=== Return specialists ===
- Cliff Harris#, Oregon (Coaches-1)
- Robert Woods, USC (Coaches-1)
- Omar Bolden, Arizona St. (Coaches-2)
- Ronald Johnson, USC (Coaches-2)

=== Special teams player ===
- Chike Amajoyi, Stanford (Coaches-1)
- Bryson Littlejohn, Oregon (Coaches-2)

== Key ==
Coaches = selected by Pac-12 coaches

# = unanimous selection by coaches

== See also ==
- 2010 College Football All-America Team
