= Tevin McDonald =

American football player (born 1992)

No. 37
- Position: Safety

Personal information
- Born: July 17, 1992 (age 34); Fresno, California, U.S.
- Listed height: 5 ft 11 in (1.80 m)
- Listed weight: 195 lb (88 kg)

Career information
- High school: Edison (Fresno)
- College: UCLA; Eastern Washington
- NFL draft: 2015: undrafted

Career history
- Oakland Raiders (2015); BC Lions (2017–2018)

Awards and highlights
- First-team All-Big Sky (2014); Third-team All-Big Sky (2013)

Career NFL statistics
- Total tackles: 1
- Stats at Pro Football Reference
- Stats at CFL.ca

Tevin William McDonald (born July 17, 1992) is an American former professional football player who was a safety in the National Football League (NFL) and Canadian Football League (CFL). He played college football for the Eastern Washington Eagles after leaving the UCLA Bruins.

== College career ==
McDonald played at the University of California, Los Angeles, from 2010 to 2013 when he was dismissed by Jim Mora for off-field extracurricular issues. He redshirted as a freshman in 2010, then went on to play in 2011 and 2012 for the Bruins. McDonald was named a freshman All-American in 2011. In 2012, he ranked third on the team in tackles with 94. He later played at Eastern Washington University for the Eagles for the 2013 and 2014 seasons, and finished his senior year with 86 tackles and 7 interceptions.

== Professional career ==
Pre-draft measurables
Height	Weight	Arm length	Hand span	40-yard dash	10-yard split	20-yard split	20-yard shuttle	Three-cone drill	Vertical jump	Broad jump	Bench press
5 ft 11 3/8 in (1.81 m)	195 lb (88 kg)	29 3/4 in (0.76 m)	9 in (0.23 m)	4.58 s	1.58 s	2.58 s	4.26 s	7.01 s	33.0 in (0.84 m)	9 ft 4 in (2.84 m)	19 reps
All values from NFL Combine/Pro Day

On September 19, 2015, McDonald was promoted to the 53-man roster. On September 22, 2015, McDonald was waived. On October 10, 2015, McDonald was promoted to the 53-man roster after the release of Taylor Mays. On October 24, 2015, McDonald was waived after the signing of Shelby Harris. On November 7, 2015, McDonald was promoted to the 53-man roster after the release of C. J. Wilson. On December 19, 2015, McDonald was promoted to the 53-man roster after right tackle Austin Howard was placed on Injured Reserve.

== Personal life ==
Tevin is the son of six-time NFL All-Pro and Super Bowl-winning safety Tim McDonald, who most recently coached defensive backs in 2016 for the Buffalo Bills. He also has a brother, T. J. McDonald, who last played as a safety for the Miami Dolphins in 2018.
