= Cliff Harris (cornerback) =

American football player (born 1990)

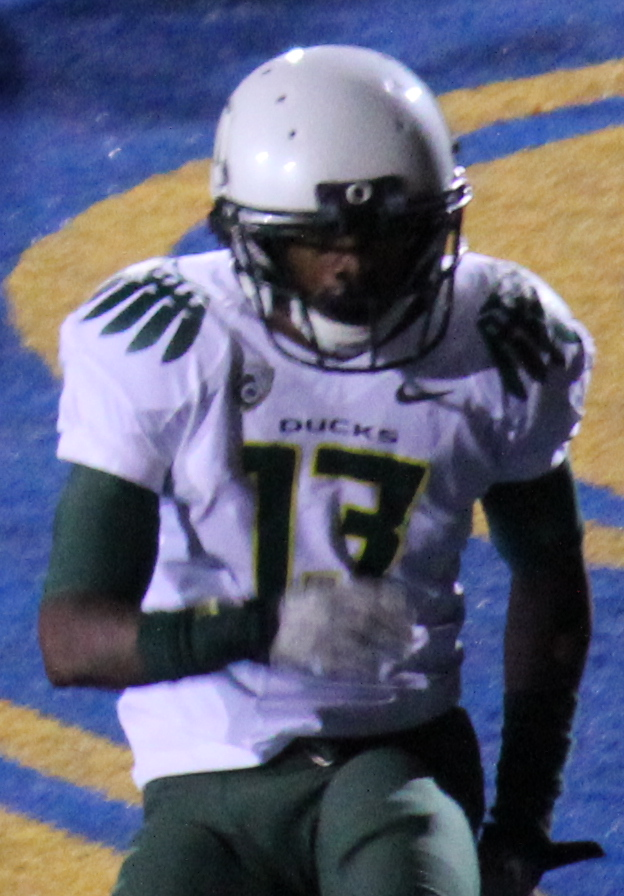
- Harris in November 2010.

Profile
- Position: Cornerback

Personal information
- Born: December 12, 1990 (age 35); Fresno, California, U.S.
- Listed height: 5 ft 11 in (1.80 m)
- Listed weight: 180 lb (82 kg)

Career information
- High school: Edison (Fresno)
- College: Oregon
- NFL draft: 2012: undrafted

Career history
- Philadelphia Eagles (2012)*; New York Jets (2013)*
- * Offseason or practice squad member only

Awards and highlights
- Consensus All-American (2010); CFPA Punt Returner Award (2010); First-team All-Pac-10 (2010)

Cliff Jamaal Harris (born December 12, 1990) is an American former college football player who was a cornerback for the Oregon Ducks. He was named a consensus All-American as a kick returner in 2010. He was signed by the Philadelphia Eagles of the National Football League (NFL) as an undrafted free agent in 2012.

== Early life ==
Harris attended Edison High School in Fresno, California, where he was a teammate of T. J. McDonald. Regarded as a four-star recruit by Rivals.com, Harris was listed as the #7 cornerback prospect in the class of 2009.

== College career ==
Harris attended the University of Oregon, and played for coach Chip Kelly's Oregon Ducks football team from 2009 to 2011. Through the conclusion of the 2010 regular season, he had 33 solo tackles and five interceptions while also leading the nation with four punt return touchdowns and 20 passes defended. Harris was indefinitely suspended from playing after being pulled over in a car by Oregon State Police for traveling 118 miles per hour on Interstate 5 with a suspended license. He had been cited for the same pair of offenses in the recent past on multiple occasions. The trooper could also smell marijuana in the vehicle. When he asked who may currently be in possession of the drug, Harris memorably replied "We smoked it all", though at one point he also implied that someone else in the car, a cousin, was the only person using it. Harris was not charged with reckless driving as the trooper felt the car was under control. Following the indefinite suspension, Harris was dismissed from the Oregon football team December 5, 2011, after a series of traffic-related offenses and a reported citation for possession of marijuana.

== Professional career ==
=== Philadelphia Eagles ===
Harris was signed by the Philadelphia Eagles as an undrafted free agent on April 29, 2012. He was released on August 26, 2012.

=== New York Jets ===
Harris was signed to a reserve/future contract by the New York Jets on January 4, 2013. He was waived on April 30, 2013 after he and teammate Claude Davis were arrested and charged with possession of marijuana.

== Personal life ==
Harris was arrested May 3, 2013, outside a Hillsboro Buffalo Wild Wings for domestic harassment. He was seen and heard arguing with his girlfriend in the restaurant and pushing her outside. The woman did not press charges and Harris was released on bail. Days later, Harris was cited for speeding, passing in a no-passing zone, and driving without a license on his way to his court appearance. He told the deputy he was running late for his court appearance, and the deputy called the court to notify them of the situation, allowing extra time. When he did not appear on time for the adjusted appointment, the judge issued a warrant for his arrest. Harris did eventually appear in court, and was arrested upon arrival.
