= Alani Fua =

American football player (born 1992)

No. 48, 59
- Position: Linebacker

Personal information
- Born: January 1, 1992 (age 34); San Fernando, California, U.S.
- Listed height: 6 ft 5 in (1.96 m)
- Listed weight: 234 lb (106 kg)

Career information
- High school: Oaks Christian School (Westlake Village, California)
- College: BYU
- NFL draft: 2015: undrafted

Career history
- Arizona Cardinals (2015–2017)

Career NFL statistics
- Total tackles: 8
- Fumble recoveries: 1
- Stats at Pro Football Reference

Alani Fua (born January 1, 1992) is an American former professional football player who was a linebacker in the National Football League (NFL). He was signed by the Arizona Cardinals as an undrafted rookie free agent following the 2015 NFL draft. He played college football for the BYU Cougars from 2010 to 2014.

== Professional career ==
=== Arizona Cardinals ===
Fua was signed by the Arizona Cardinals as an undrafted free agent on May 2, 2015.

On September 28, 2016, Fua was placed on injured reserve with a knee injury.

On July 31, 2017, Fua was waived/injured by the Cardinals and placed on injured reserve. He was released on September 18, 2017.

== Personal life ==
Alani Fua is of Tongan descent, the son of George and Helen Fua. His older brother, Sione Fua, is currently a free agent.

His father, George Fua, of San Mateo, played tight end for Ricks College, San Joaquin Delta College, and Cal State Northridge in the late 1980s and early 1990s. He went undrafted in the 1991 NFL draft and briefly played professional football in the Arena Football League, with the Sacramento Attack and Miami Hooters. He now operates a construction company in Northridge, California.
