= Tyron Smith =

American football player (born 1990)

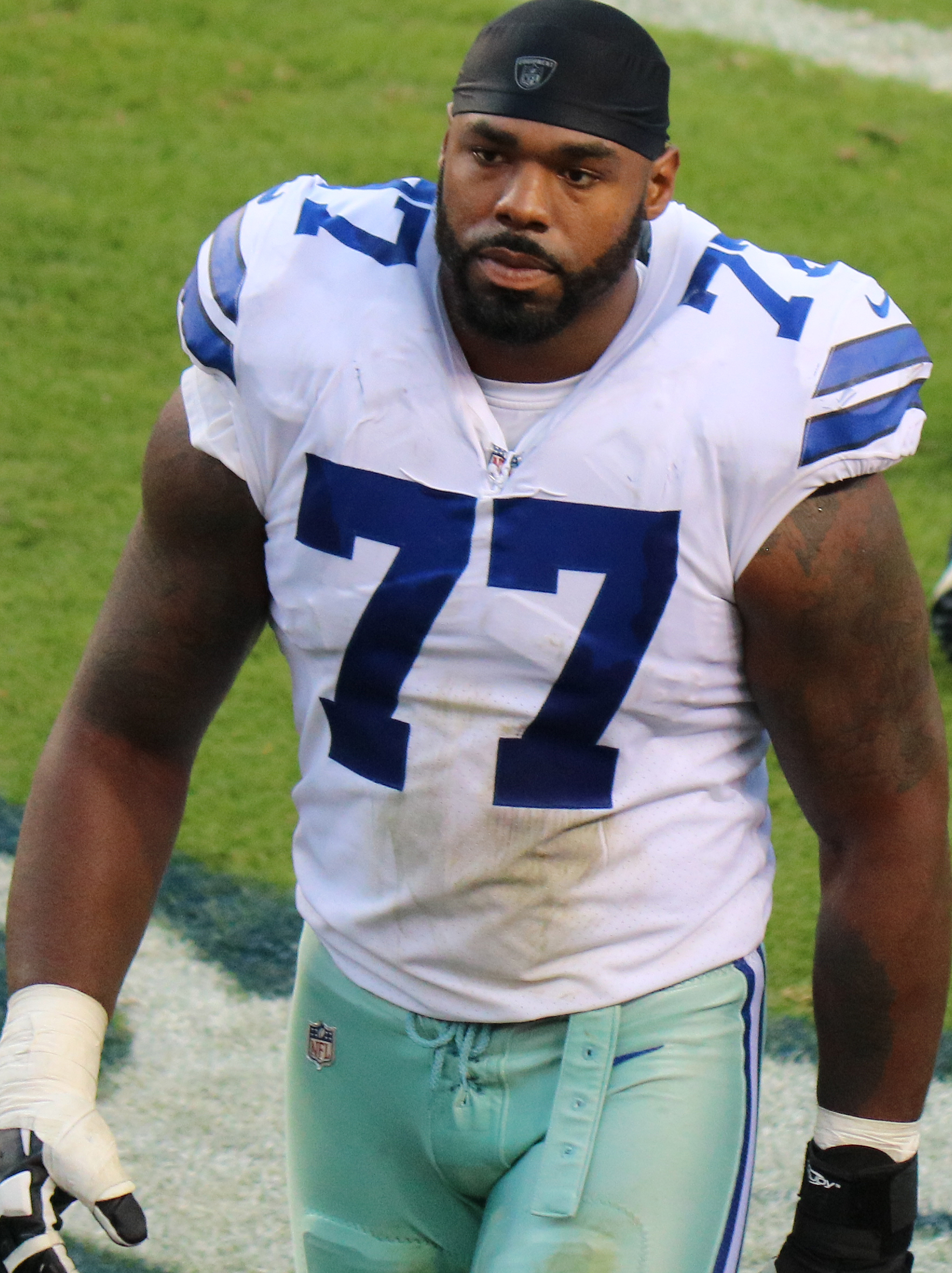
- Smith with the Dallas Cowboys in 2017

No. 77
- Position: Offensive tackle

Personal information
- Born: December 12, 1990 (age 35); Los Angeles, California, U.S.
- Listed height: 6 ft 5 in (1.96 m)
- Listed weight: 320 lb (145 kg)

Career information
- High school: Rancho Verde (Moreno Valley, California)
- College: USC (2008–2010)
- NFL draft: 2011: 1st round, 9th overall pick

Career history
- Dallas Cowboys (2011–2023); New York Jets (2024)

Awards and highlights
- 2× First-team All-Pro (2014, 2016); 3× Second-team All-Pro (2013, 2015, 2023); 8× Pro Bowl (2013–2019, 2021); NFL 2010s All-Decade Team; PFWA All-Rookie Team (2011); Built Ford Tough Offensive Line of the Year (2016); Morris Trophy (2010); First-team All-Pac-10 (2010)

Career NFL statistics
- Games played: 171
- Games started: 171
- Stats at Pro Football Reference

Tyron Jerrar Smith (born December 12, 1990) is an American former professional football player who played offensive tackle in the National Football League for 14 seasons. He played college football for the USC Trojans where he won the Morris Trophy, recognizing the best offensive and defensive linemen on the West Coast, in 2010. Smith was selected by the Dallas Cowboys with the ninth overall pick in the 2011 NFL draft. He played 14 seasons with the Cowboys and finished his career with the New York Jets. Smith was an eight-time Pro Bowler, a 5 time All-Pro, and was named to the 2010s All-Decade Team.

== Early life ==
Smith attended Rancho Verde High School in Moreno Valley, California, where he played on the offensive and defensive line. He earned All-American honors by Parade, SuperPrep, PrepStar, Scout.com, and EA Sports, while also receiving numerous other All-Region honors. As a junior in 2006, he made Cal-Hi Sports All-State Underclass second team, All-CIF Central Division first team, and Riverside Press-Enterprise All-Riverside County second team. Smith played in the 2008 U.S. Army All-American Bowl. Also a standout in track & field at Rancho Verde, Smith notched top-throws of 14.23 meters (46 feet, 7 inches) in the shot put and 46.62 meters (152 feet, 10 inches) in the discus.

Considered a five-star recruit and described as "an amazing right tackle prospect" by Rivals.com, Smith was ranked as the No. 6 offensive tackle prospect. Scout.com, who also viewed Smith as a five-star recruit, listed him as the No. 1 offensive tackle prospect in the nation.

== College career ==
Smith played three seasons with the USC Trojans from 2008 to 2010. As a freshman, he was the backup left offensive tackle. He appeared in 10 games. As a sophomore, he started the first twelve games at right offensive tackle. He earned All-Pac-10 honorable mention and CollegeFootballNews.com Sophomore All-American honorable mention for the 2009 season. As a junior, he appeared in twelve games.

== Professional career ==
=== Pre-draft ===
Smith was considered one of the top offensive tackle prospects in the 2011 NFL draft.

Pre-draft measurables
Height	Weight	Arm length	Hand span	Wingspan	40-yard dash	10-yard split	20-yard split	20-yard shuttle	Three-cone drill	Vertical jump	Broad jump	Bench press
6 ft 5 in (1.96 m)	307 lb (139 kg)	36 3/8 in (0.92 m)	11 in (0.28 m)	7 ft 0 5/8 in (2.15 m)	4.93 s	1.69 s	2.87 s	4.68 s	7.47 s	29 in (0.74 m)	9 ft 1 in (2.77 m)	31 reps
All values from NFL Combine/Pro Day

=== Dallas Cowboys ===
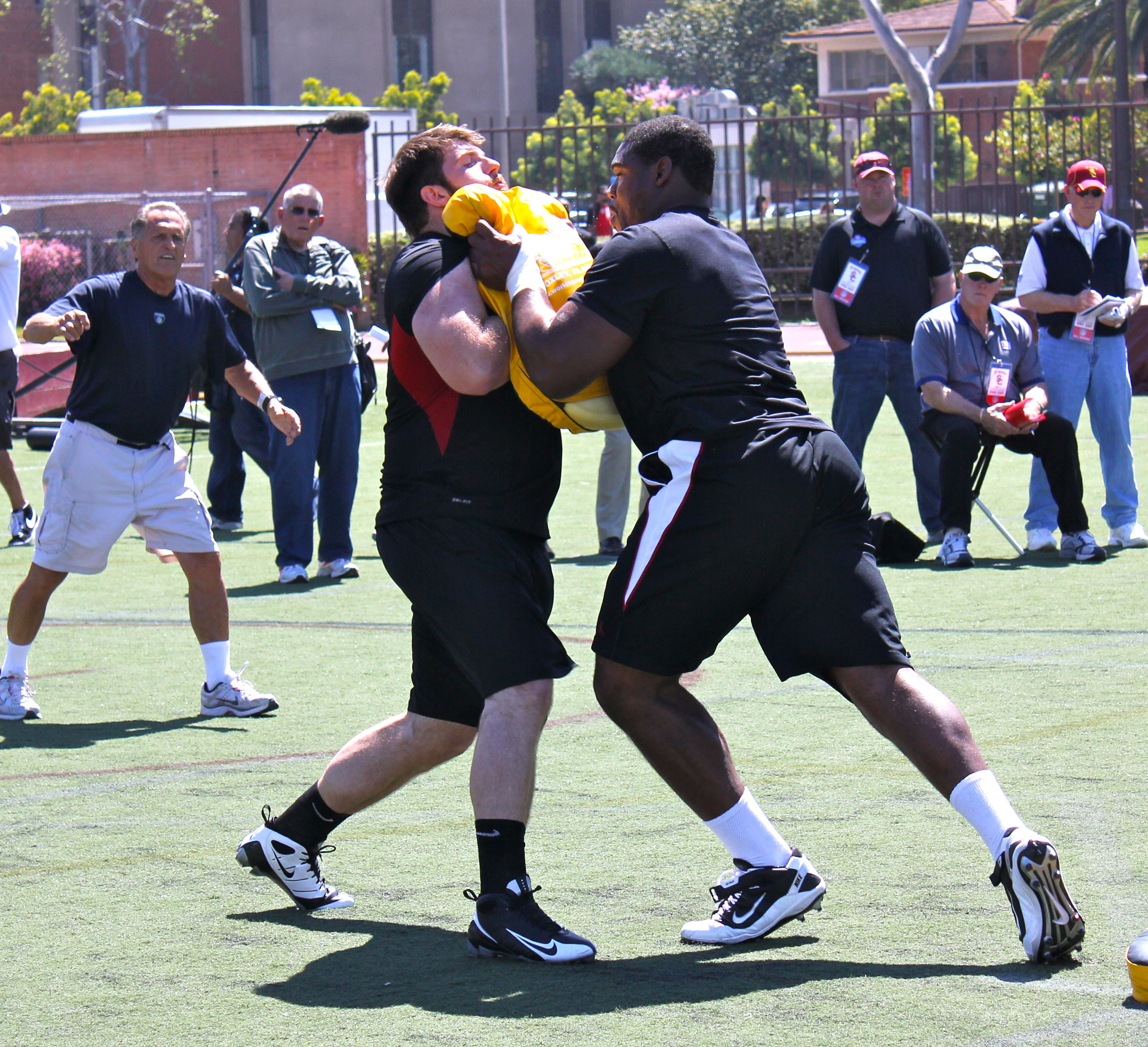
Smith (right) in 2011

==== 2011 season ====
Selected by the Dallas Cowboys with the ninth overall pick, he was the first offensive lineman drafted in the first round by the Cowboys since Jerry Jones bought the team in 1989, and the highest in franchise history since John Niland went fifth overall in 1966. He signed a four-year, $12.5 million contract.

Entering the league as a 20-year-old rookie, Smith was named a starter at right tackle from the first day of Organized Team Activities, with Doug Free taking over the left tackle spot. His role became even more important after the Cowboys released veteran offensive linemen Marc Colombo, Leonard Davis, Andre Gurode, and Montrae Holland during the preseason. Smith started every game and earned praise for his play, prompting the media to speculate on a possible move to left tackle in the next season. He was named to the NFL All-Rookie Team.

==== 2012 season ====
Starting the 2012 season, Smith switched to starting left tackle, switching sides on the offensive line with Free. On September 12, Smith was fined $15,000 for a touchdown-saving horse-collar tackle he made during the season opener against the New York Giants. He started 15 games for the Cowboys in the 2012 season.

==== 2013 season ====
In his third year with the Cowboys, Smith committed just one holding penalty and allowed only one sack in his 16 starts. He was named to the 2014 Pro Bowl on Team Rice. He was ranked 78th by his fellow players on the NFL Top 100 Players of 2014.

==== 2014 season ====
If you went into a computer lab and tried to create the perfect prototype tackle, it would be him. Smith does things to guys—toys with them, humbles them—that you honestly shouldn't be able to do to people in the NFL.

— Ross Tucker, former NFL lineman-turned-analyst.

Smith signed an eight-year, $109 million contract extension with the Cowboys in July, making him the highest-paid offensive lineman in the league at the time. He was widely considered one of the top three offensive tackles in the league, and for his play against the Seattle Seahawks, he became the first offensive lineman in 10 years to be named Offensive Player of the Week. He started all 16 games for the NFL's second ranked rushing offense, while helping DeMarco Murray become the league's rushing leader. He was ranked 36th by his fellow players on the NFL Top 100 Players of 2015. Smith was named as a Pro Bowler and first team All-Pro.

==== 2015 season ====
Smith started all 16 games, helped clear the way for the NFL's fourth leading rusher (Darren McFadden) and earned his third Pro Bowl selection. He was ranked 42nd by his fellow players on the NFL Top 100 Players of 2016.

==== 2016 season ====
Forced to play through nagging injuries throughout the season, Smith helped lead the Cowboys to a 13–3 record, and aided rookie Ezekiel Elliott in becoming the league's leading rusher. Smith was named the first team left tackle for the 2016 All-Pro Team, the second time he carried this honor in his career. He was named to his fourth consecutive Pro Bowl and was named First-team All-Pro, both honors being shared with fellow Cowboy offensive linemen Travis Frederick and Zack Martin. He was ranked 18th by his peers on the NFL Top 100 Players of 2017 as the highest ranked offensive lineman.

==== 2017 season ====
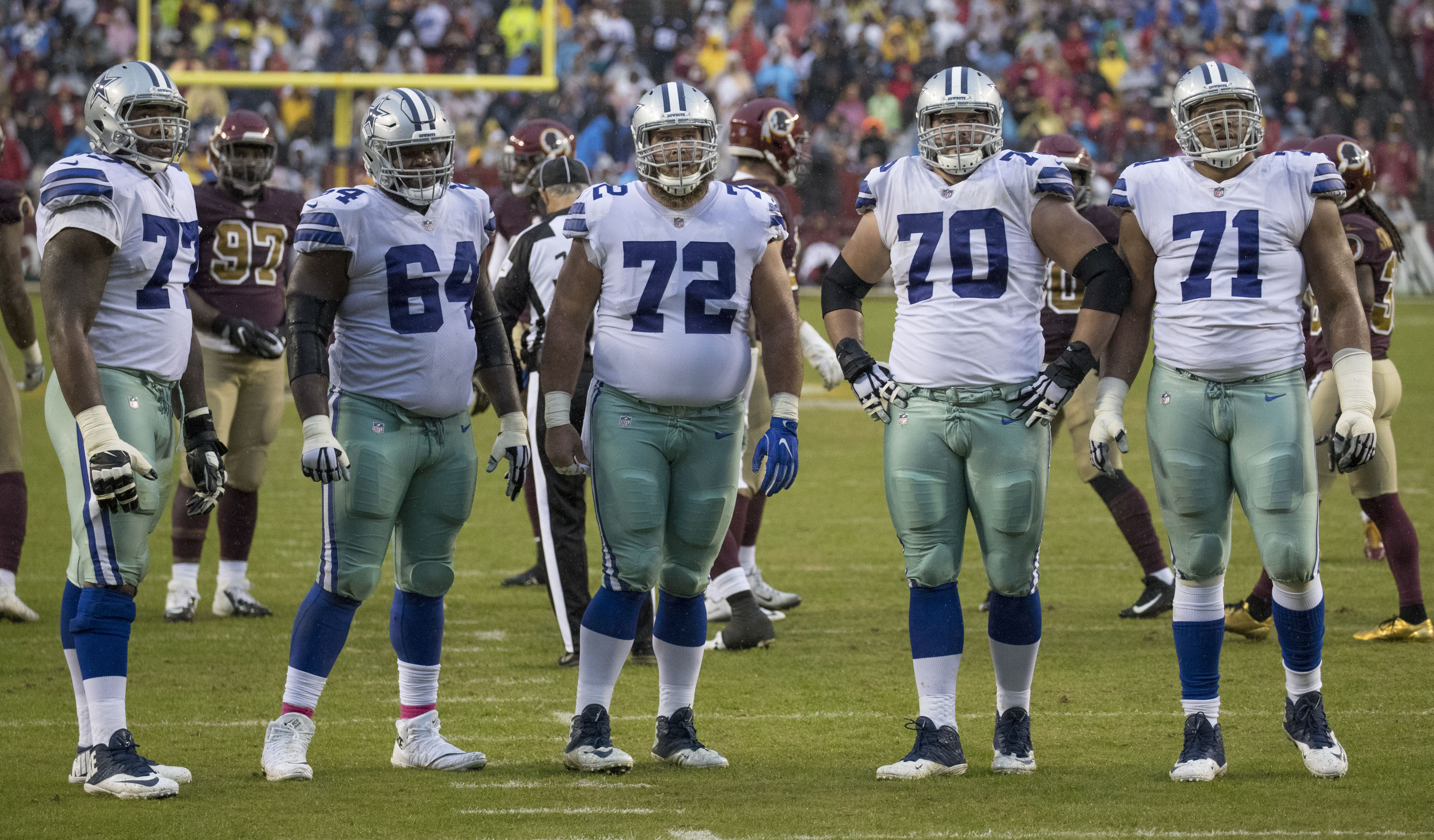
Dallas Cowboys offensive line in a game against the Washington Redskins, 2017

Smith was named to his fifth straight Pro Bowl alongside guard Zack Martin and center Travis Frederick for the second straight year. Smith's 2017 season was marred by multiple injuries, which included to his knee, back, groin, and hip. He started and played in 13 games. He was placed on injured reserve on December 29, meaning that he would not play in the season finale against the Philadelphia Eagles. He was ranked 39th by his fellow players on the NFL Top 100 Players of 2018.

==== 2018 season ====
Smith started 13 games at left tackle, missing three with injury, on his way to his sixth straight Pro Bowl. He was ranked 52nd by active NFL players on the NFL Top 100 Players of 2019.

==== 2019 season ====
Smith started 13 games at left tackle in 2019. He earned a seventh straight Pro Bowl selection since 2013. He was ranked #78th by his fellow players on the NFL Top 100 Players of 2020. He was named to the Pro Football Hall of Fame All-2010s Team.

==== 2020 season ====
In 2020, Smith had been bothered by a neck issue spanning within the past years. On October 9, Smith announced that he would forgo the rest of the 2020 season after choosing to have surgery on his neck. He was subsequently placed on the injured reserve.

==== 2021 season ====
Smith suffered multiple ankle injuries that lingered throughout the season. Smith missed Weeks 9, 10, 11, 12, 15, and 16 due to the injuries. He started in 11 regular season games and the Cowboys' Wild Card Round loss to the San Francisco 49ers. He was named to the Pro Bowl for the 2021 season. He was ranked 92nd by his fellow players on the NFL Top 100 Players of 2022.

==== 2022 season ====
Smith suffered a torn hamstring in practice during training camp. He was placed on injured reserve on August 31, 2022. He was activated on December 17, and moved to right tackle with the emergence of Tyler Smith. He made his season debut in Week 15 against the Jacksonville Jaguars. He started in four regular season games and the Cowboys' two playoff games in the 2022 season.

==== 2023 season ====
Smith appeared in and started 13 games for the Cowboys in the 2023 season.

=== New York Jets ===
On March 18, 2024, Smith signed with the New York Jets on a one-year deal worth up to $20 million. He started in the first ten games of the 2024 season. Smith suffered a neck injury which put him on injured reserve, and caused him to miss the remainder of the regular season.

=== Retirement ===
On April 15, 2025, Smith signed a one-day contract to retire as a Cowboy after 14 NFL seasons.

== Regular season statistics ==
Legend
**Bold**	Career high

Year	Team	Games		Offense					
Year	Team	GP	GS	Snaps	Pct	Holding	False start	Decl/Pen	Acpt/Pen
2011	DAL	16	16	-	**100%**	3	4	1	7
2012	DAL	15	15	949	93%	2	**7**	0	**11**
2013	DAL	16	16	996	**100%**	1	3	**3**	4
2014	DAL	16	16	**1,060**	**100%**	2	5	1	8
2015	DAL	16	16	1,029	**100%**	3	4	2	8
2016	DAL	13	13	835	97%	4	2	1	6
2017	DAL	13	13	758	87%	5	3	0	8
2018	DAL	13	13	849	99%	**7**	2	0	10
2019	DAL	13	13	882	99%	5	1	1	7
2020	DAL	2	2	154	**100%**	0	1	0	1
2021	DAL	11	11	739	91%	5	0	2	7
2022	DAL	4	4	271	92%	0	0	1	0
2023	DAL	13	13	847	94%	2	1	0	2
2024	NYJ	10	10	592	95%	1	2	**3**	3
Career		171	171	9,961	-	40	35	15	83

== Personal life ==
Smith married girlfriend Holly in 2024, in a wedding attended by former Cowboys teammates.
