= Chris Conte =

American football player (born 1989)

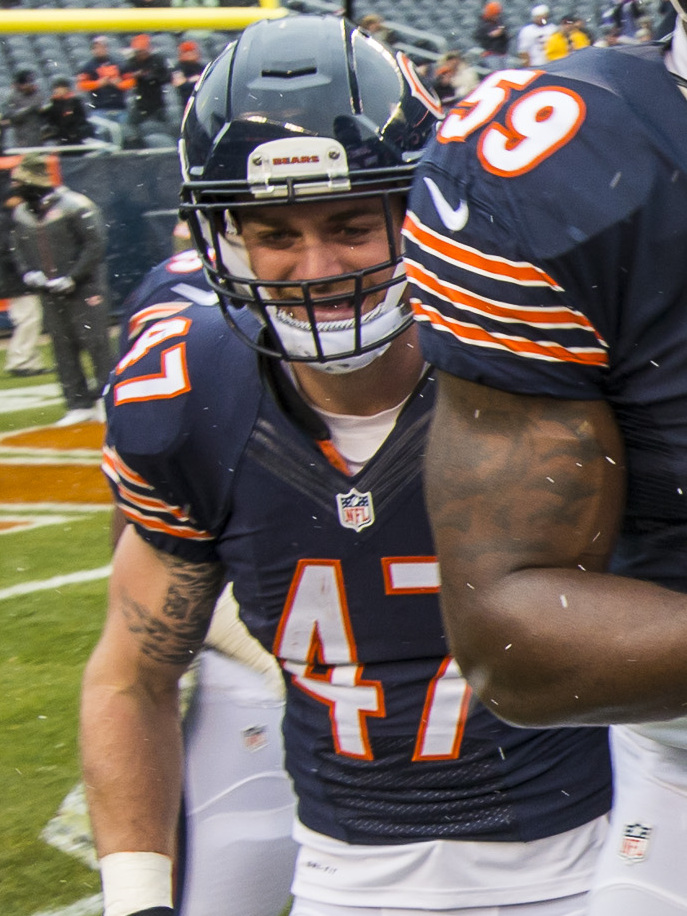
- Conte playing for the Chicago Bears in 2014

No. 47, 23
- Position: Safety

Personal information
- Born: February 23, 1989 (age 37); Pacific Palisades, California, U.S.
- Listed height: 6 ft 2 in (1.88 m)
- Listed weight: 203 lb (92 kg)

Career information
- High school: Loyola (Los Angeles, California)
- College: California (2007–2010)
- NFL draft: 2011: 3rd round, 93rd overall pick

Career history
- Chicago Bears (2011–2014); Tampa Bay Buccaneers (2015–2018)

Awards and highlights
- PFWA All-Rookie Team (2011); First Team All-Pac-10 (2010)

Career NFL statistics
- Total tackles: 469
- Forced fumbles: 7
- Fumble recoveries: 2
- Pass deflections: 40
- Interceptions: 14
- Defensive touchdowns: 1
- Stats at Pro Football Reference

Christopher Michael Conte (born February 23, 1989) is an American former professional football player who was a safety in the National Football League (NFL). He was selected by the Chicago Bears in the third round of the 2011 NFL draft. He played college football for the California Golden Bears.

== Early life ==
Conte attended Loyola High School, and graduated in 2007. During his time at Loyola, Conte played both safety and wide receiver. Conte was named to the All-Far West team by SuperPrep, and posted 58 tackles with 4 INTs and caught 43 passes for 614 yards and 4 touchdowns in his senior year, as well as helping his team to the CIF Division I title as a junior, collecting 38 tackles and 2 INTs.

Conte is the grandson of the late actor Richard Conte, who died in 1975.

College recruiting
Name	Hometown	School	Height	Weight	Commit date
Chris Conte; Safety	Los Angeles, California	Loyola High School	6 ft 2 in (1.88 m)	180 lb (82 kg)	Feb 7, 2007
Chris Conte; Safety	Recruit ratings: Scout: Rivals: (68)				
Overall recruit ranking: Scout: 65 Rivals: 22
Note: In many cases, Scout, Rivals, 247Sports, On3, and ESPN may conflict in their listings of height and weight.; In these cases, the average was taken. ESPN grades are on a 100-point scale.; Sources: "California College Football Team Recruiting Prospects". Scout.; "Scout.com Team Recruiting Rankings". Scout.; "2007 Team Ranking". Rivals.com.

== College career ==
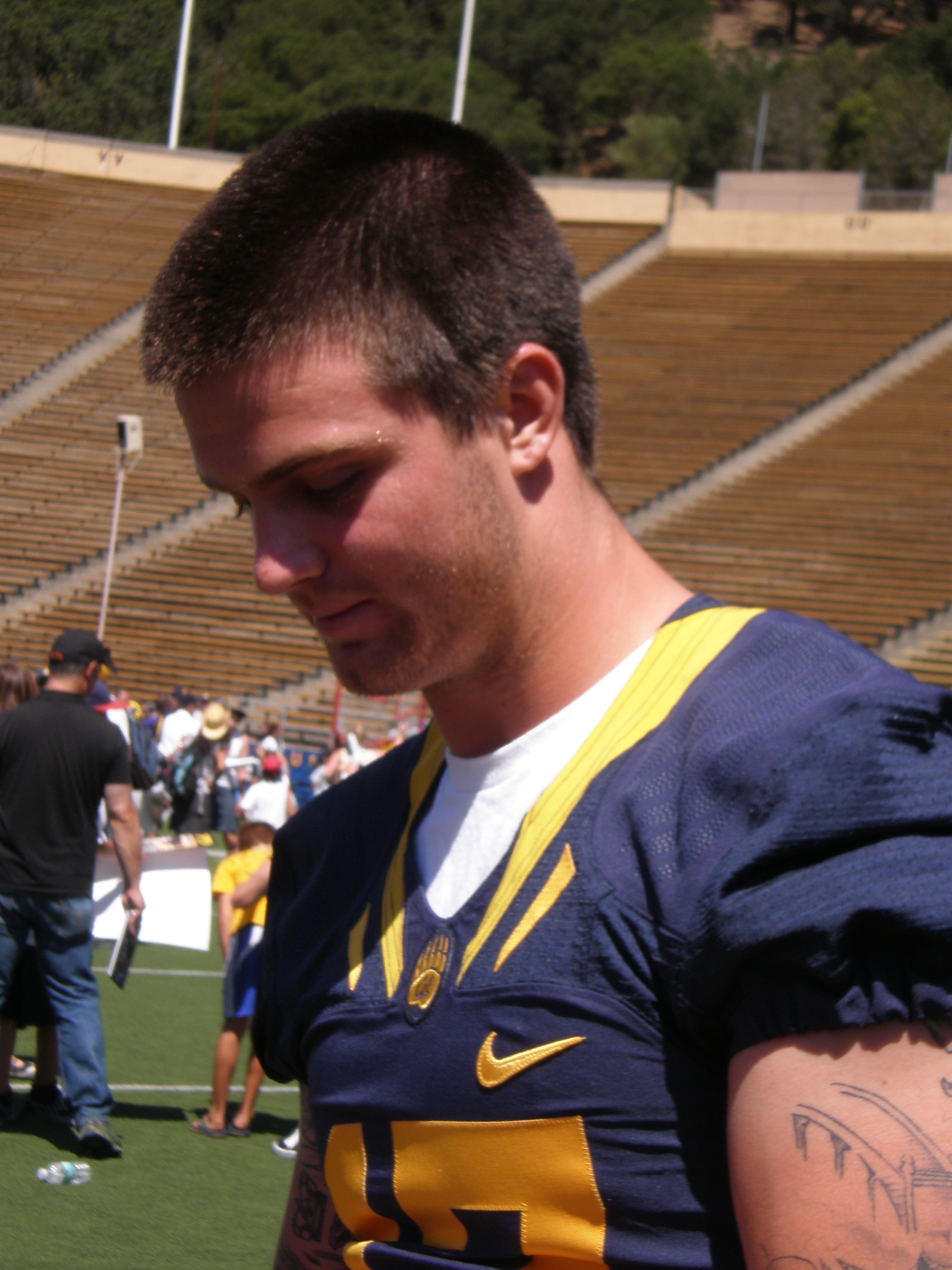
Conte during his tenure at Cal in August 2009

Conte expressed interest in UCLA, but ultimately committed to California on February 7, 2007. Conte played in 50 games, with 17 starts during his four seasons at Cal, and compiled career totals of 157 tackles, 4.0 tackles for loss (−13 yards), two interceptions (for no return yards), 11 pass breakups, a forced fumble, a fumble recovery, three kick returns for a total of 55 yards (18.3 ypr) and one blocked punt that he returned six yards for a touchdown against the Arizona State Sun Devils. In his senior year, Conte earned first-team all-Pac-10 honors.

== Professional career ==
=== Pre-draft ===
At the NFL Scouting Combine, Conte was one of the top performers in the broad jump, as he finished fourth among defensive back prospects.

External videos
- Chris Conte's NFL Combine workout

Pre-draft measurables
Height	Weight	Arm length	Hand span	Wingspan	40-yard dash	10-yard split	20-yard split	20-yard shuttle	Three-cone drill	Vertical jump	Broad jump	Bench press
6 ft 2 3/8 in (1.89 m)	197 lb (89 kg)	30 1/2 in (0.77 m)	9 1/8 in (0.23 m)	6 ft 0 5/8 in (1.84 m)	4.54 s	1.66 s	2.66 s	4.19 s	7.01 s	35.5 in (0.90 m)	10 ft 7 in (3.23 m)	18 reps
All values from NFL Combine/Pro Day

=== Chicago Bears ===
==== 2011 ====
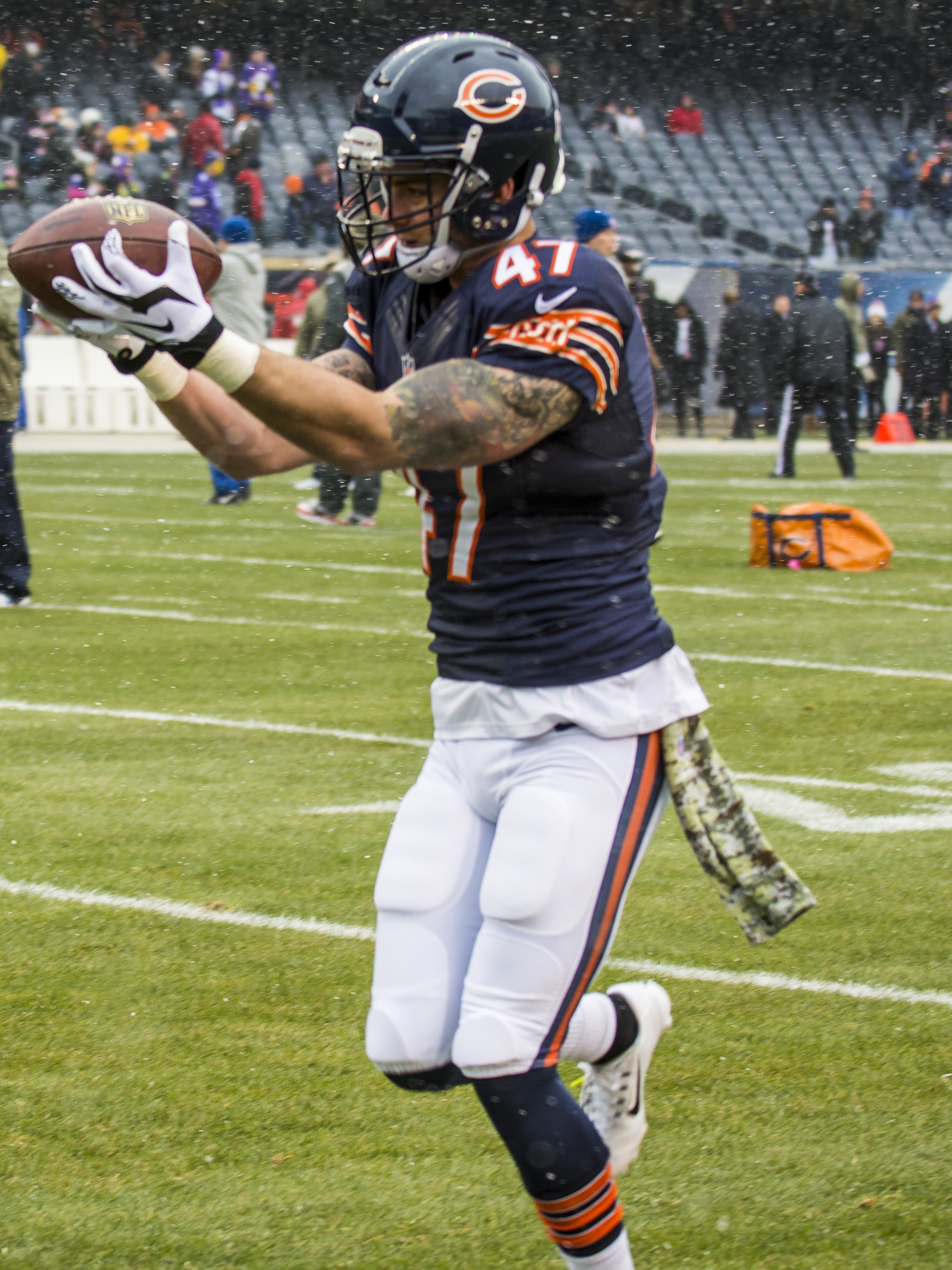
Conte playing with the Chicago Bears in November 2014

The Chicago Bears selected Conte in the third round (93rd overall) of the 2011 NFL draft. Conte was the third safety drafted in 2011.

On July 29, 2011, the Bears signed Conte to a four-year, $2.60 million contract that includes a signing bonus of $533,600.

Throughout training camp, Conte competed for a job as a starting safety against Major Wright and Chris Harris. Head coach Lovie Smith named Conte the backup free safety to begin the regular season, behind Major Wright.

He made his professional regular season debut in the Chicago Bears' season-opening 30–12 victory against the Atlanta Falcons. The following week, Conte recorded his first career tackle during a six-yard run on running back Pierre Thomas in the third quarter of a 30–13 loss at the New Orleans Saints in Week 2. On October 16, 2011, Conte made his first career start and recorded a season-high six combined tackles in a 39–10 victory against the Minnesota Vikings in Week 6. Conte was named the starter after Brandon Meriweather was benched after Meriweather had disappointing performances in the first five games of the season. On October 23, 2011, Conte recorded a solo tackle, two pass deflections, and made his first career interception in the Bears' 24–18 victory at the Tampa Bay Buccaneers in Week 7. He intercepted a pass by quarterback Josh Freeman at the two-yard line, that was originally intended for receiver Mike Williams, in the first quarter. On December 19, 2011, the Chicago Bears placed Conte on injured reserve after he injured his foot during a Week 15 loss to the Seattle Seahawks the previous day. Conte finished his rookie season in 2011 with 30 combined tackles (23 solo), two pass deflections, and an interception in 14 games and nine starts. Pro Football Focus gave Conte the 43rd highest overall grade among all qualifying safeties in 2011.

==== 2012 ====
Conte entered training camp slated as the starting free safety. Head coach Lovie Smith officially named him the starter to begin the regular season, alongside strong safety Major Wright.

He started in the Chicago Bears' season-opener against the Indianapolis Colts and recorded four combined tackles, two pass deflections, and intercepted a pass by Andrew Luck that was deflected by cornerback Tim Jennings in their 41–21 victory. On October 1, 2012, he collected a season-high 11 combined tackles (eight solo) during a 34–18 victory at the Dallas Cowboys in Week 4. He was inactive for the Bears' Week 17 victory at the Detroit Lions after injuring his shoulder the previous week. On December 31, 2012, the Chicago Bears fired head coach Lovie Smith after they finished with a 10–6 record and did not qualify for the playoffs. He completed the 2012 season with 68 combined tackles (52 solo), nine passes defended, two interceptions, and a fumble recovery in 15 games and 15 starts. He received the 56th highest overall grade from Pro Football Focus among all qualifying safeties in 2012.

==== 2013 ====
The Bears' new head coach Marc Trestman opted to retain Conte and Major Wright as the starting safety duo to start the 2013 regular season. On November 10, 2013, Conte recorded three combined tackles, a season-high three pass deflections, and an interception during a 21–19 loss to the Detroit Lions in Week 10. In Week 16, he collected a season-high ten combined tackles (eight solo) in the Bears' 54–11 loss at the Philadelphia Eagles in Week 16.

In the final game of the regular season, Conte made a crucial mistake and blew a pass coverage which allowed Randall Cobb to catch the go-ahead touchdown reception and eventual winning touchdown in their 33–28 loss to the Green Bay Packers. During the play, Conte did not receive the signal to check out of zone coverage and into man coverage which allowed Randall Cobb to make the catch uncontested. NBC Sports analyst Rodney Harrison stated on air, "He just flat-out blows the coverage, everyone else is playing man-to-man coverage, and he lets his wide receiver go straight down the field." The loss eliminated the Chicago Bears (8–8) from playoff contention and allowed the Green Bay Packers (8–7–1) to receive a NFC wildcard berth and finish first in the NFC North. Conte finished the game with four solo tackles, a pass deflection, and an interception.

Conte finished the 2013 season with a career-high 90 combined tackles (73 solo) seven passes defended, three interceptions, and two forced fumbles in 16 games and 16 starts. Conte was ranked as the 82nd out of 86 total rankings in safety during the 2013 season under new defensive coordinator Mel Tucker, according to Pro Football Focus.

==== 2014 ====
On April 3, 2014, the Chicago Bears announced that Conte recently underwent shoulder surgery in March and was projected to miss the next 4–5 months and training camp. During the preseason, Conte competed against Danny McCray to retain his starting role. Head coach Marc Trestman opted to retain Conte as the starter, along with strong safety Ryan Mundy, to start the regular season.

Conte started in the Chicago Bears' season-opener against the Buffalo Bills and recorded seven combined tackles, a pass deflection, and intercepted a pass by E. J. Manuel in their 23–20 loss. On September 13, 2014, Conte was fined $22,050 for a helmet-to-helmet hit he delivered on wide receiver Robert Woods during the fourth quarter of their loss to the Bills. He was inactive for the Bears' Week 7 loss to the Miami Dolphins after sustaining a concussion the previous week. In Week 8, Conte collected a season-high eight combined tackles during a 51–23 loss at the New England Patriots. On December 4, 2014, Conte made two combined tackles before exiting the Bears' 41–28 loss to the Dallas Cowboys due to a knee injury. His injury sidelined him for the last three games of the regular season. Conte finished the 2013 season with 43 combined tackles (32 solo), three pass deflections, and three interceptions in 12 games and 12 starts.

==== 2015 ====
Conte became an unrestricted free agent in 2015 and attended a private visit with the Tampa Bay Buccaneers.

=== Tampa Bay Buccaneers ===
On March 12, 2015, the Tampa Bay Buccaneers signed Conte to a fully guaranteed one-year, $1.50 million contract with a signing bonus of $250,000. Conte was reunited with Tampa Bay Buccaneers' head coach Lovie Smith.

Throughout training camp, Conte competed to be the starting free safety against Bradley McDougald. Head coach Lovie Smith named Conte the backup free safety, behind Bradley McDougald, to begin the 2015 regular season.

On September 20, 2015, Conte earned his first start of the season after Major Wright injured his abdomen in the season-opener and was sidelined for the next three games (Weeks 2–4). Conte finished the Buccaneers' 26–19 victory at the New Orleans Saints with five solo tackles, a pass deflection, and an interception. He intercepted a pass thrown by quarterback Drew Brees, that was initially intended for wide receiver Brandin Cooks, and was in the process of being tackled for a two-yard loss when he quickly lateraled the ball to cornerback Alterraun Verner. Verner returned it for a 28-yard gain to set up a field goal in the third quarter of the Tampa's Week 2 victory. In Week 11, Conte recorded a season-high ten combined tackles (seven solo), broke up a pass, and made an interception during a 45–17 victory at the Philadelphia Eagles. He was inactive for the last two games of the regular season (Weeks 16–17) after injuring his knee during a Week 15 loss at the St. Louis Rams. On January 1, 2016, the Tampa Bay Buccaneers placed Conte on injured reserve. Conte completed the 2015 season with a total of 79 combined tackles (59 solo), six pass deflections, two forced fumbles and two interceptions in 14 games and 13 starts.

==== 2016 ====
On January 6, 2016, the Tampa Bay Buccaneers fired head coach Lovie Smith after they finished last in the NFC South Division with a 6–10 record. Conte became an unrestricted free agent and received interest from the Buccaneers and New York Giants. On March 13, 2016, the Tampa Bay Buccaneers re-signed Conte to a one-year, $3 million contract that includes $2.50 million guaranteed.

He entered training camp slated as the starting free safety, but saw competition for his role from Keith Tandy and Major Wright. Head coach Dirk Koetter officially named Conte the starting free safety to open the regular season, opposite strong safety Bradley McDougald.

He started in the Tampa Bay Buccaneers' season-opener at the Atlanta Falcons and collected a season-high 11 combined tackles (seven solo) in their 31–24 victory. On November 13, 2016, Conte recorded seven combined tackles, broke up a pass, and returned an interception for his first career touchdown during the Buccaneers' 36–10 victory against his former team, the Chicago Bears, in Week 10. He intercepted a pass thrown by quarterback Jay Cutler, that was intended for tight end Logan Paulsen, and returned it for a 20-yard touchdown in the first quarter. The following week, Conte collected seven solo tackles, a pass deflection, and an interception during a 19–17 win at the Kansas City Chiefs in Week 11. The game marked his second consecutive game with an interception. In Week 12, Conte sustained a chest injury during a 14–5 victory against the Seattle Seahawks and was sidelined for the next two games (Weeks 13–14). He completed the 2016 season with 69 combined tackles (59 solo), five passes defensed, two interceptions, and a touchdown in 14 games and 11 starts. Conte earned an overall grade of 42.0 from Pro Football Focus and ranked 88th among all qualifying safeties in 2016.

==== 2017 ====
On March 9, 2017, the Tampa Bay Buccaneers re-signed Conte to a two-year, $5 million contract with $2.5 million guaranteed.

Defensive coordinator Mike Smith held a competition to name a starting free safety. Conte competed against Keith Tandy, J. J. Wilcox, and Justin Evans. Head coach Dirk Koetter retained Conte and Keith Tandy as the starting safety duo to begin the season.

In Week 8, Conte collected a season-high nine combined tackles, deflected a pass, and an interception in their 17–3 loss to the Carolina Panthers. On December 24, 2017, he tied his season-high of nine combined tackles and also deflected a pass during a 22–19 loss at the Carolina Panthers in Week 16. He completed the season with 77 combined tackles (62 solo), eight pass deflections, and an interception in 16 games and 14 starts. Pro Football Focus gave Conte an overall grade of 74.6, which ranked him 57th among all qualifying safeties in 2017.

==== 2018 ====
In Week 2 of the 2018 season, Conte tore his PCL and left the game. Despite the injury, he continued to practice with a brace on his knee. The following week against the Pittsburgh Steelers, he received a stiff-arm fend from tight end Vance McDonald that knocked him to the ground as McDonald ran for the 75-yard touchdown. The play aggravated his PCL injury, and he was placed on injured reserve on September 28.

Conte retired from the NFL after playing eight seasons. He explained in 2024 that years of being on bad teams and "showing up to a miserable locker room after a loss knowing everyone's livelihood was on the line" caused him to lose interest in playing outside of getting paid, but was otherwise "very proud of my journey."

== Career statistics ==
=== NFL ===
Legend
**Bold**	Career high

Year	Team	Games		Tackles					Interceptions					Fumbles			
Year	Team	GP	GS	Cmb	Solo	Ast	Sck	TFL	Int	Yds	TD	Lng	PD	FF	FR	Yds	TD
2011	CHI	14	9	30	23	7	0.0	1	1	0	0	0	2	0	0	0	0
2012	CHI	15	15	68	52	16	0.0	2	2	70	0	35	**9**	0	**1**	0	0
2013	CHI	**16**	**16**	**89**	**72**	17	0.0	1	**3**	48	0	35	7	2	0	0	0
2014	CHI	12	12	43	32	11	0.0	0	**3**	6	0	5	3	0	0	0	0
2015	TAM	14	13	79	59	**20**	0.0	**6**	2	-4	0	-2	6	2	0	0	0
2016	TAM	14	11	69	59	10	0.0	1	2	**73**	**1**	**53**	5	0	**1**	**10**	0
2017	TAM	**16**	14	77	62	15	0.0	0	1	0	0	0	8	**3**	0	0	0
2018	TAM	3	3	14	10	4	0.0	0	0	0	0	0	0	0	0	0	0
Career		104	93	469	369	100	0.0	11	14	193	1	53	40	7	2	10	0

=== College ===
Season	Defense			
Season	Cmb	Int	Fum	PD
2007	32	0	1	0
2008	28	1	0	7
2009	25	0	0	1
2010	72	1	3	3
Total	157	2	4	11

== Personal life ==
Conte's wife Stephanie was a cheerleader for the Buccaneers. They have three children.

Following his retirement, he moved to California. Conte founded Sports Movements, a program to educate children on athletics and sports.
