= Omar Bolden =

American football player (born 1988)

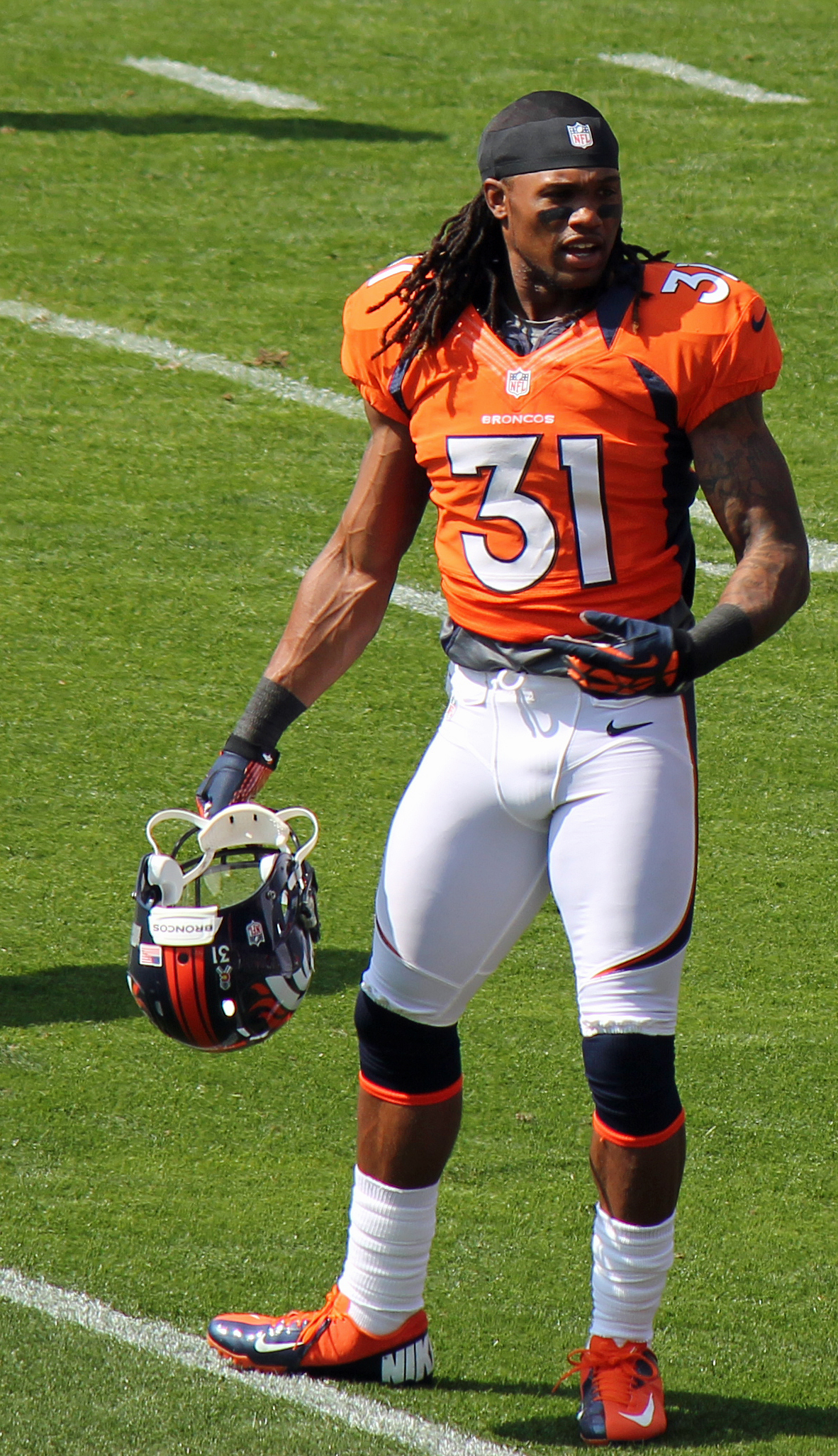
- Bolden with the Denver Broncos in 2012

No. 31
- Position: Safety

Personal information
- Born: December 20, 1988 (age 37); Ontario, California, U.S.
- Listed height: 5 ft 10 in (1.78 m)
- Listed weight: 198 lb (90 kg)

Career information
- High school: Colony (Ontario)
- College: Arizona State
- NFL draft: 2012: 4th round, 101st overall pick

Career history
- Denver Broncos (2012–2015); Chicago Bears (2016)*
- * Offseason or practice squad member only

Awards and highlights
- Super Bowl champion (50); First-team All-Pac-10 (2010)

Career NFL statistics
- Total tackles: 51
- Fumble recoveries: 2
- Pass deflections: 1
- Return yards: 1,208
- Total touchdowns: 1
- Stats at Pro Football Reference

Omar Bolden (born December 20, 1988) is an American former professional football player who was a safety in the National Football League (NFL). He played college football for the Arizona State Sun Devils and was selected by the Denver Broncos in the fourth round of the 2012 NFL draft.

== Early life ==
Bolden attended Colony High School in Ontario, California, where he starred at running back and defensive back. As a senior, he ran for 2,003 yards (143.1 yards per game) and 26 touchdowns and amassed over 2,500 all-purpose yards. On defense, he totaled 80 tackles, two blocked punts and one interception. Bolden was named CIF Central Division Most Valuable Player and the Inland Valley Player of the Year after leading Colony to its first CIF title in 2006.

Bolden was first brought up to Varsity as a Freshman against Ontario High School to play running back. This game was played at Chaparral high school due to a massive fire that prevented any local games from being played. His first two carries of his high school career resulted in fumbles.

Considered a four-star recruit by Rivals.com, Bolden was listed as the No. 7 all-purpose back recruit in the nation. He ran a 4.35 40-yard dash at the 2006 Scout.com Los Angeles Combine, the fastest by any player at the camp and the fourth-fastest among participants at Scout.com′s 13 nationwide high school combines throughout the year.

Bolden chose Arizona State over Southern California and received several other offers, from schools including Michigan, Nebraska, Oregon State and Washington.

== College career ==
As a true freshman in 2007, Bolden played in all 13 games, making nine starts for the Sun Devils. He recorded 33 tackles (24 solo), six pass break-ups, and one interception, which he returned for a touchdown, on the season. He earned First-team Freshman All-American honors by the Football Writers Association of America, as well as Second-team Freshman All-American honors by Rivals.com and College Football News.

In his sophomore season, Bolden started all 12 games at cornerback and finished fifth on the team with 49 tackles (37 solo). He totaled seven pass break-ups and two interceptions on the season. Bolden received Honorable Mention Sophomore All-American by College Football News that year.

== Professional career ==
=== Denver Broncos ===
Bolden was considered one of the top cornerback prospects of his class. He was selected by the Denver Broncos in the fourth round with the 101st overall pick of the 2012 NFL draft.

On November 8, 2015, Bolden returned a punt for a touchdown, but the Broncos lost 27–24 to the Indianapolis Colts. On February 7, 2016, Bolden was part of the Broncos team that won Super Bowl 50. In the game, the Broncos defeated the Carolina Panthers by a score of 24–10. Bolden did not play in the game because he was on injured reserve.

As of 2017's NFL offseason, Bolden holds at least two Broncos franchise records, including:

- Yds/KR: season (33.0 in 2014)
- Yds/PR: season (24.6 in 2015)

=== Chicago Bears ===
Bolden signed with the Chicago Bears on March 31, 2016, and was cut one week before training camp on July 22, 2016.

=== Retirement ===
On October 20, 2017, Bolden retired from the NFL.
