= Stephen Paea =

New Zealand-born American football player (born 1988)

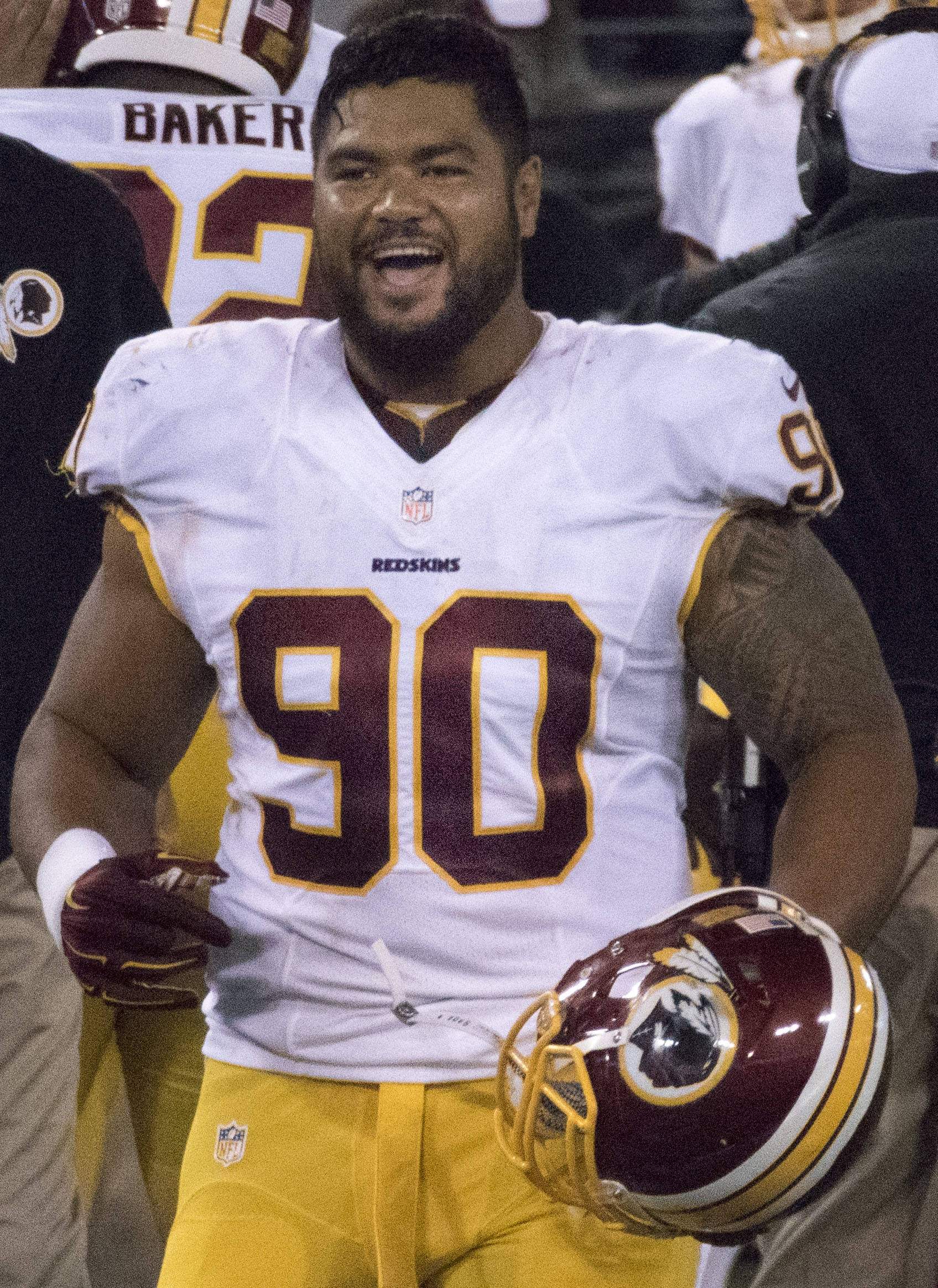
- Paea with the Washington Redskins in 2015

No. 92, 90, 99, 55
- Position: Defensive tackle

Personal information
- Born: May 11, 1988 (age 38); Auckland, New Zealand
- Listed height: 6 ft 1 in (1.85 m)
- Listed weight: 295 lb (134 kg)

Career information
- High school: Timpview (Provo, Utah, U.S.)
- College: Oregon State (2008–2010)
- NFL draft: 2011: 2nd round, 53rd overall pick

Career history
- Chicago Bears (2011–2014); Washington Redskins (2015); Cleveland Browns (2016); Dallas Cowboys (2017)

Awards and highlights
- 2× Morris Trophy (2009, 2010); Pac-10 Defensive Player of the Year (2010); Consensus All-American (2010); 2× First-team All-Pac-10 (2009, 2010)

Career NFL statistics
- Total tackles: 129
- Sacks: 14.0
- Forced fumbles: 3
- Pass deflections: 6
- Stats at Pro Football Reference

Stephen Paea (/ˈpaɪ.ə/ PY-ə; born May 11, 1988) is a New Zealand former American football player who was a defensive tackle in the National Football League (NFL). He played college football for the Oregon State Beavers, earning consensus All-American honors in 2010. He was selected by the Chicago Bears in the second round of the 2011 NFL draft, and also played for the Washington Redskins, Cleveland Browns, and Dallas Cowboys.

== Early life ==
Born in Auckland, New Zealand, Paea grew up in Vavaʻu, Tonga, where he played high school rugby union and dreamt of playing at Number 8 for the All Blacks. When he was 16, his family moved to the United States, initially to Lawrence, Kansas, where his cousin Chris Maumalanga was playing for the Kansas Jayhawks. After a year, they moved to Provo, Utah, where Paea attended Timpview High School. Playing defensive line at only 240 pounds, he drew little attention by Division I schools, so he decided to enroll at nearby Snow College in Ephraim. Paea was also the state runner-up in the shot put, with a top-throw of 16.09 meters (52′08″) and a state qualifier in the discus with a best of 46.72 meters (153′03″).

After redshirting his initial year at Snow, he added more than 20 pounds to his frame and started the 2007 season as the No. 2 tackle on the depth chart. Finally drawing the attention of major schools, he transferred to Oregon State in mid-season after graduating from Snow with an associate degree in December 2007.

== College career ==
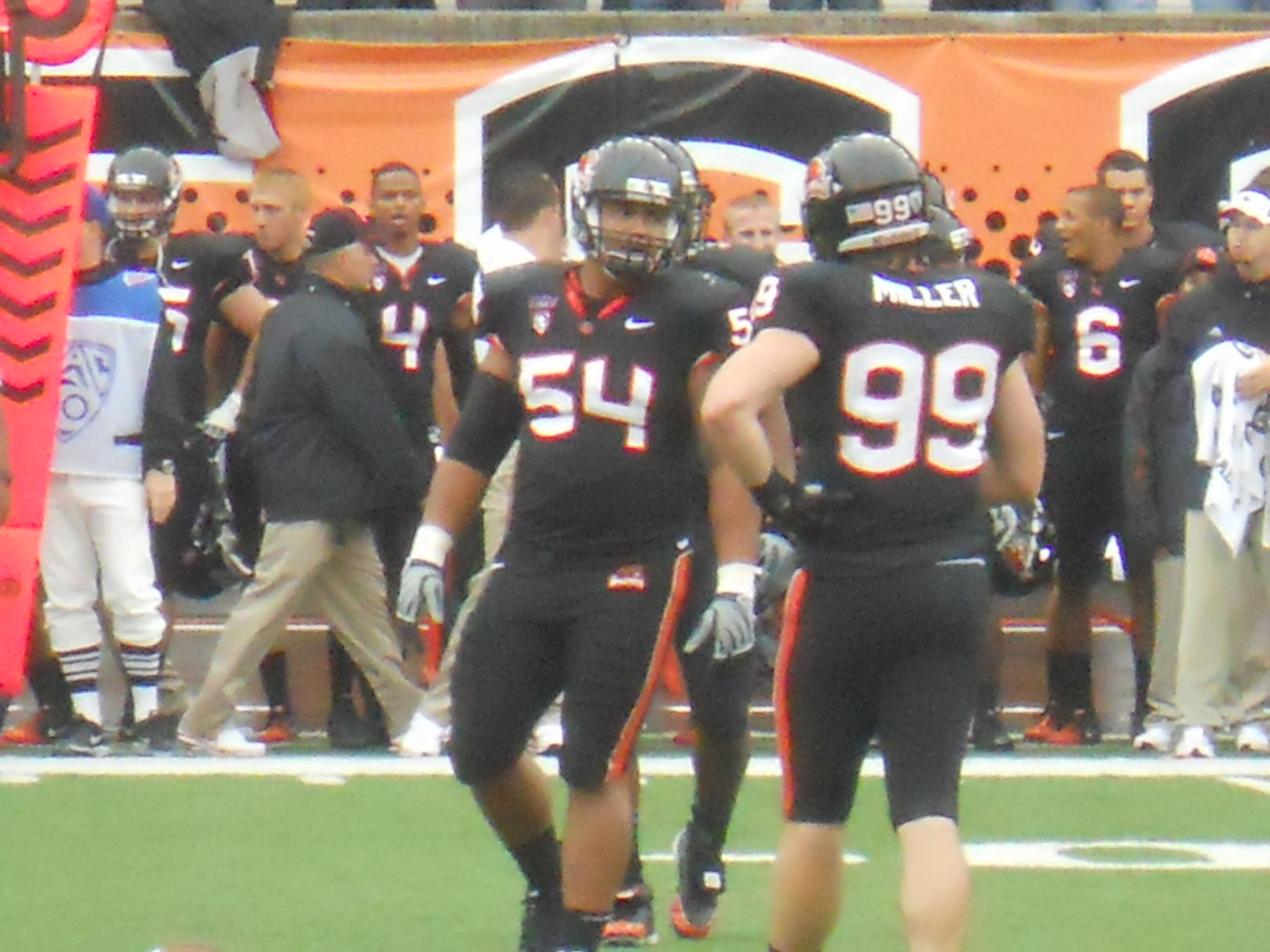
Paea (left) in a game vs. Louisville in 2010.

Paea attended Oregon State University, where he played for the Oregon State Beavers football team from 2008 to 2010. Making an immediate impact for the Beavers, Paea played in all 13 games, starting 12 of them, and recorded 41 tackles, 11 for a loss, and five quarterback sacks. He was selected to College Football News′ All-Sophomore Second Team and was an honorable mention All-Pac-10 selection.

As a junior, Paea registered a team-leading 8.5 tackles for loss and was co-leader for sacks with three. He was named All-Pacific-10 First Team and received the Morris Trophy for the best defensive lineman in the conference.

Paea was invited to the 2011 Senior Bowl, but tore the lateral meniscus in his right knee on the opening practice, causing him to miss the remainder of the event.

Paea was a nominee for the Bill Hayward Athlete of the Year Award at the 2011 Oregon Sports Awards.

== Professional career ==
=== Pre-draft ===
At the 2011 NFL Combine, Paea performed 49 repetitions in the 225-pound bench press, a number that still stands as the second-most all time.

Pre-draft measurables
Height	Weight	Arm length	Hand span	Wingspan	40-yard dash	Bench press
6 ft 1 1/4 in (1.86 m)	303 lb (137 kg)	32 7/8 in (0.84 m)	10 in (0.25 m)	6 ft 6 in (1.98 m)	4.98 s	49 reps
All values from NFL Combine

=== Chicago Bears ===
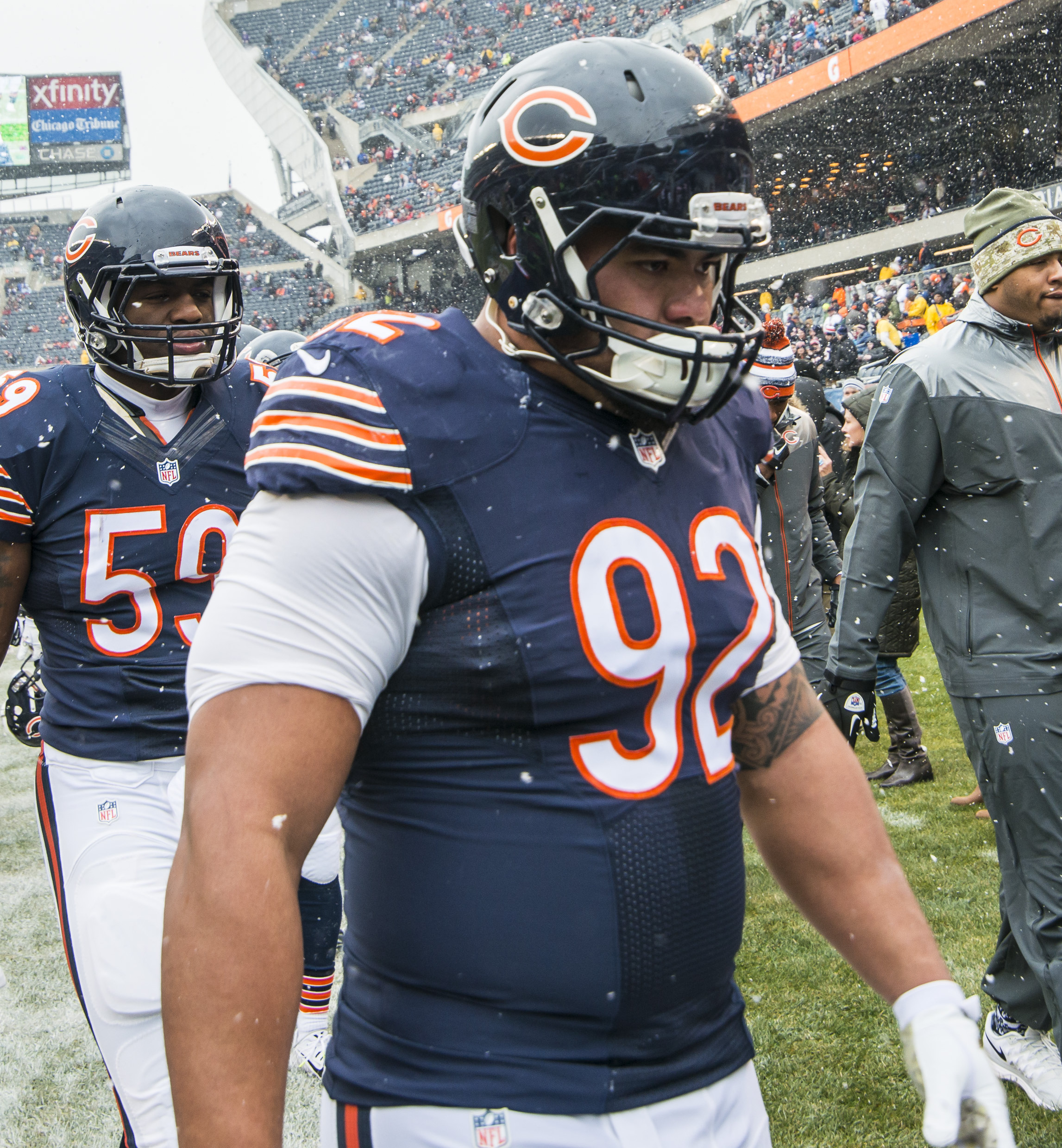
Paea with the Bears in 2014

Paea was selected with the 53rd overall pick in the second round of the 2011 NFL draft by the Chicago Bears. On July 29, 2011, he signed a 4-year contract with the Chicago Bears.

In a Sunday Night Football game on October 16 against the Minnesota Vikings, as well as his NFL debut, Paea sacked Donovan McNabb in the end zone for a safety, being the first Bears player to record a safety in his debut since at least 1970.

In 2012, Paea and Nick Roach were awarded the Brian Piccolo Award.

After the 2012 NFL draft, Paea was reunited with Oregon State teammate Brandon Hardin.

During the preseason, Paea injured his left ankle during a workout but started in the season opener against the Indianapolis Colts.

=== Washington Redskins ===
On March 10, 2015, Paea signed a four-year contract with the Washington Redskins, to play defensive end in their 3–4 defense. On December 11, the team placed him on injured reserve with a Grade 2 toe sprain. He appeared in 11 games (one start), registering 19 tackles and 1.5 sacks. He was released by the team on August 30, 2016.

=== Cleveland Browns ===
On September 2, 2016, the Cleveland Browns signed Paea as a free agent to play defensive end and provide depth on the defensive line. He appeared in 13 games, registering 12 tackles and a half-sack.

=== Dallas Cowboys ===
On March 10, 2017, Paea signed a one-year contract with the Dallas Cowboys, to help replace defensive tackle Terrell McClain who left in free agency. He also reunited with Rod Marinelli who was his defensive coordinator with the Chicago Bears. Although he battled a degenerative knee condition, he had a strong showing in the preseason and earned the starting position at defensive tackle, which gave the team the confidence to release Cedric Thornton. The knee injury would not improve and kept him out of practice since the first week of the regular season. He still managed to start 4 games, posting 7 tackles (2 for loss) and one quarterback pressure. On October 11, he decided to inform the team that he would be retiring from the NFL. He was placed on the injured reserve list on October 13.

== NFL career statistics ==
Legend
**Bold**	Career high

Year	Team	Games		Tackles					Interceptions					Fumbles			
Year	Team	GP	GS	Cmb	Solo	Ast	Sck	TFL	Int	Yds	TD	Lng	PD	FF	FR	Yds	TD
2011	CHI	11	0	14	8	6	2.0	2	0	0	0	0	0	0	0	0	0
2012	CHI	15	14	24	13	11	2.5	4	0	0	0	0	1	0	0	0	0
2013	CHI	13	10	23	11	**12**	1.5	3	0	0	0	0	**3**	0	0	0	0
2014	CHI	**16**	**16**	**33**	**24**	9	**6.0**	**9**	0	0	0	0	2	**2**	0	0	0
2015	WAS	11	1	19	11	8	1.5	4	0	0	0	0	0	1	0	0	0
2016	CLE	13	1	12	6	6	0.5	0	0	0	0	0	0	0	0	0	0
2017	DAL	4	4	4	3	1	0.0	2	0	0	0	0	0	0	0	0	0
		83	46	129	76	53	14.0	24	0	0	0	0	6	3	0	0	0
