= Sione Fua =

American football player (born 1988)

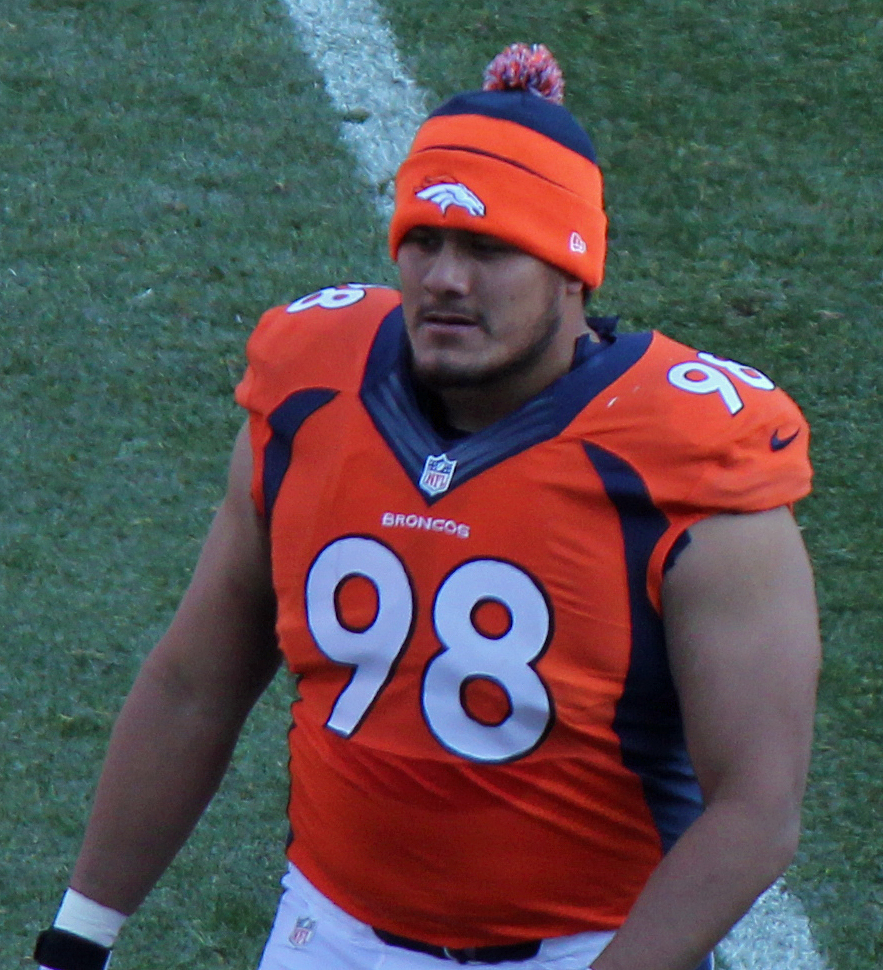
- Fua with the Denver Broncos in 2013

No. 94, 98, 70
- Position: Nose tackle

Personal information
- Born: June 15, 1988 (age 38); Lodi, California, U.S.
- Listed height: 6 ft 1 in (1.85 m)
- Listed weight: 310 lb (141 kg)

Career information
- High school: Crespi Carmelite (Encino, California)
- College: Stanford
- NFL draft: 2011: 3rd round, 97th overall pick

Career history
- Carolina Panthers (2011–2013); Denver Broncos (2013); Cleveland Browns (2014); Denver Broncos (2015)*
- * Offseason or practice squad member only

Awards and highlights
- Second-team All-Pac-10 (2010)

Career NFL statistics
- Total tackles: 35
- Forced fumbles: 1
- Stats at Pro Football Reference

Sione Fua (/siˈoʊneɪ ˈfuːɑː/ see-OH-nay FOO-ah; born June 15, 1988) is an American former professional football player who was a nose tackle in the National Football League (NFL). He was selected in the third round of the 2011 NFL draft by the Carolina Panthers after playing three seasons of college football for the Stanford Cardinal. Fua is of Tongan descent.

== Early life ==
Fua was born in Lodi, California. A native of the San Fernando Valley, Fua attended Crespi Carmelite High School in Encino, California. He did not play football until high school, but quickly became the varsity's best two-way lineman. As junior in 2004, Fua did not give up a quarterback sack and helped Crespi win the CIF Southern Section Division X championship. As a senior, Fua had over 60 tackles and eight sacks, while Crespi repeated as division champs, defeating Lompoc 24–14.

College recruiting
Name	Hometown	School	Height	Weight	40^{‡}	Commit date
Sione Fua; OG	Encino, CA	Crespi	6 ft 1 in (1.85 m)	290 lb (130 kg)	4.9	Feb 1, 2006
Sione Fua; OG	Recruit ratings: Scout: Rivals: (75)					

Regarded as a three-star recruit by Rivals.com, he was listed as the No. 47 defensive tackle prospect in the class of 2006. He chose Stanford over offers from Brigham Young, California, and Oregon.

Besides football, Fua was also an accomplished wrestler. Competing in the heavyweight division, where he constantly had to keep his weight below the 275-pound (125 kg) maximum, Fua won a CIF State Wrestling Championship as a senior in 2006. He beat fellow Polynesian Romney Fuga of Huntington Beach Edison High School, who himself became a nose tackle at Brigham Young. Fua became the only wrestler from the San Fernando Valley to win a state title.

== College career ==
Fua enrolled in Stanford in 2006. In his true freshman year, Fua played in all 12 games and finished with 16 tackles, including seven solo stops. He then missed the 2007 season while on a LDS Church mission, but retained a year of eligibility. Fua returned for the 2008 season and played in all 12 games with seven starts. He recorded 17 total tackles, including 11 solo.

As a junior, Fua started the last 11 games of the season at defensive tackle and finished with 24 tackles, including 3.0 for loss, and 1.5 quarterback sacks. He earned an honorable mention All-Pac-10 selection.

== Professional career ==
=== Pre-draft ===
Projected to be a fourth-round selection, Fua was listed as the No. 15 defensive tackle in the 2011 NFL draft by Sports Illustrated. The scouting report acknowledged he "displayed consistent progress" in college and "possesses the skill and potential to break into a starting lineup," but raised concerns about his marginal productivity in college.

Pre-draft measurables
Height	Weight	Arm length	Hand span	Wingspan	40-yard dash	10-yard split	20-yard split	20-yard shuttle	Three-cone drill	Vertical jump	Broad jump	Bench press
6 ft 1 1/2 in (1.87 m)	308 lb (140 kg)	34 in (0.86 m)	10 1/2 in (0.27 m)	6 ft 8 1/8 in (2.04 m)	5.28 s	1.77 s	3.01 s	4.54 s	7.54 s	27.0 in (0.69 m)	8 ft 7 in (2.62 m)	30 reps
All values from NFL Scouting Combine/Pro Day

=== Carolina Panthers ===
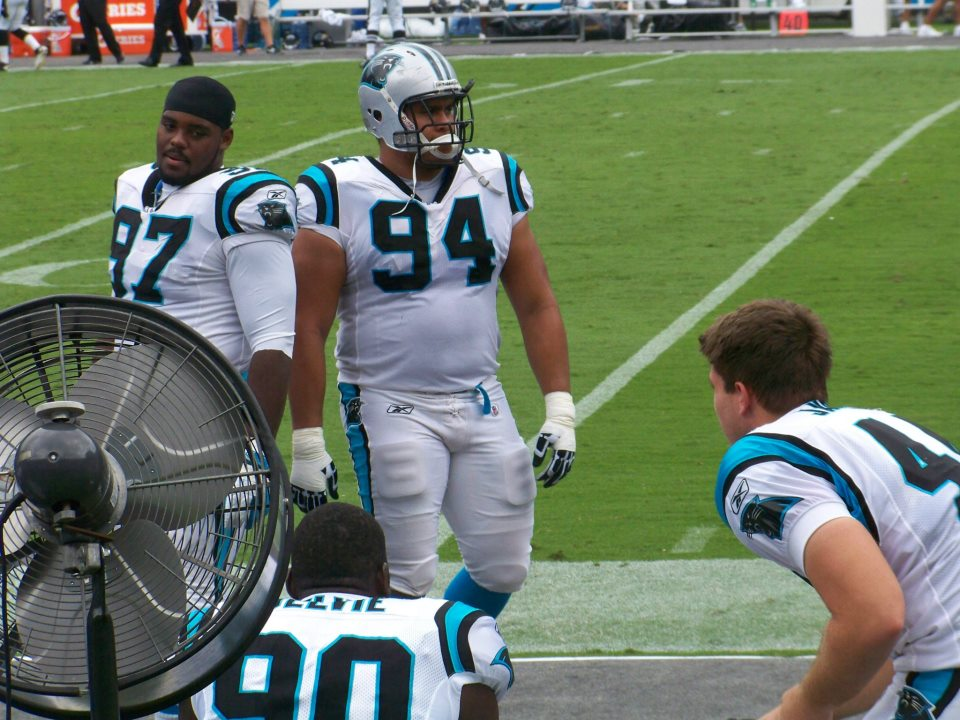
Fua (94) on the sidelines of a game against the Jacksonville Jaguars in 2011

Fua was selected in the third round with the 97th pick in the 2011 NFL draft by the Carolina Panthers. After starting in eleven games for the Panthers in 2011, he was placed on the injured reserve list on December 6.

Fua was cut on August 31, 2013. He re-signed on September 11, 2013. In the week of November 8, the Panthers announced that they would be switching Fua to the guard position. On November 12, Fua was waived by the Panthers.

=== Denver Broncos ===
Fua was signed by the Denver Broncos on November 27, 2013 following an injury that led to starting defensive tackle, Kevin Vickerson, to be placed on injured reserve.

=== Cleveland Browns ===
Fua was signed by the Cleveland Browns on October 14, 2014, following a season-ending ACL injury to defensive end Armonty Bryant.

== Personal life ==
Sione Fua is of Tongan descent, the oldest son of George and Helen Fua. His younger brother, Alani Fua, played as a linebacker on the Arizona Cardinals.

His father, George Fua, of San Mateo, played tight end for Ricks College, San Joaquin Delta College, and Cal State Northridge in the late 1980s and early 1990s. He went undrafted in the 1991 NFL draft and briefly played professional football in the Arena Football League, with the Sacramento Attack and Miami Hooters. He now operates a construction company in Northridge, California.

Since August 2012, Sione Fua is married to Ivy (née Avanessian) of North Hills, who currently is a graduate of University of California, San Francisco School of Dentistry and a practicing pediatric dentist. They have one son.
