= T. J. McDonald =

American football player (born 1991)

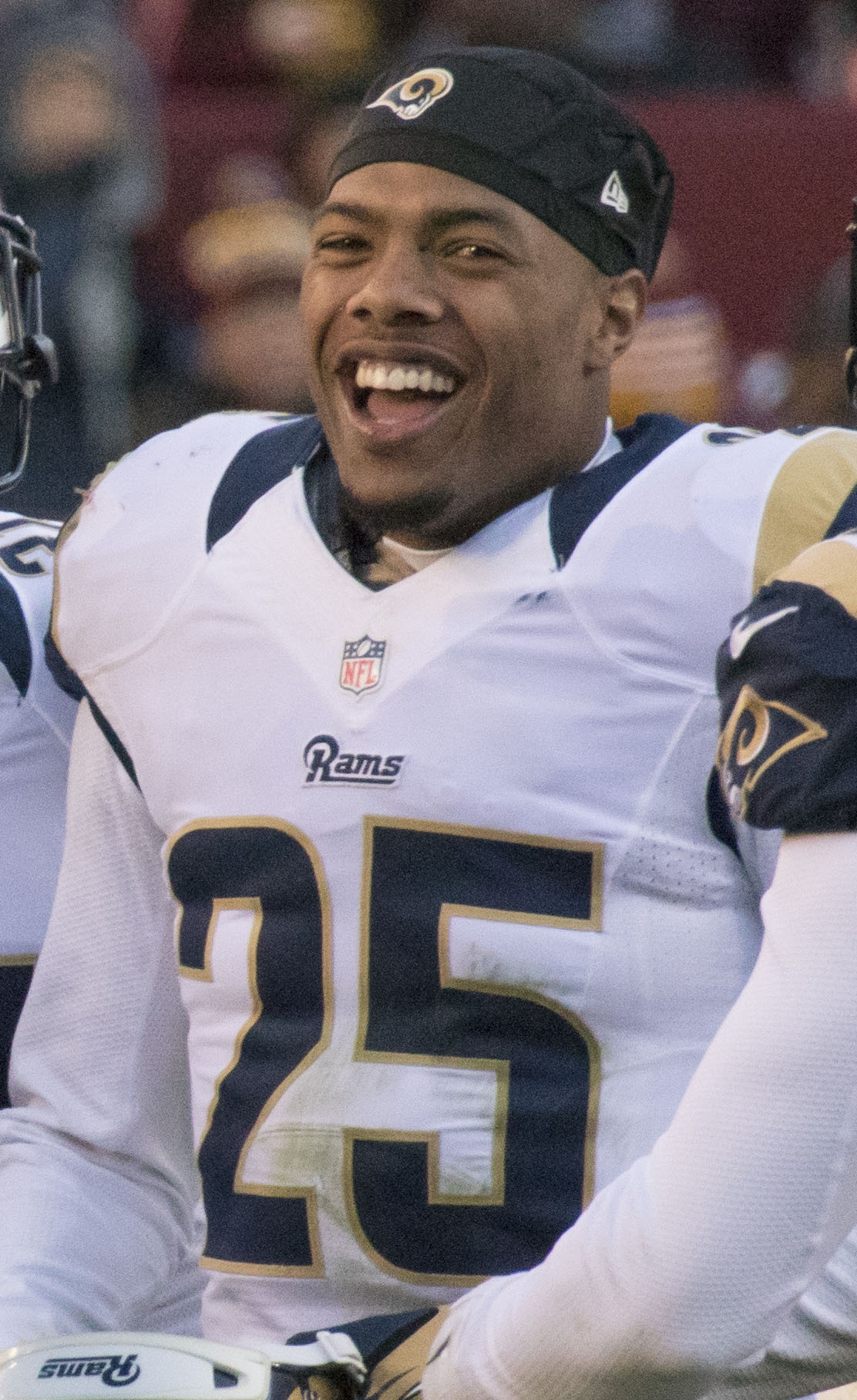
- McDonald with the St. Louis Rams in 2014

No. 25, 22
- Position: Safety

Personal information
- Born: January 26, 1991 (age 35); Fresno, California, U.S.
- Listed height: 6 ft 2 in (1.88 m)
- Listed weight: 215 lb (98 kg)

Career information
- High school: Edison (Fresno)
- College: USC (2009–2012)
- NFL draft: 2013: 3rd round, 71st overall pick

Career history
- St. Louis / Los Angeles Rams (2013–2016); Miami Dolphins (2017–2018)

Awards and highlights
- First-team All-American (2011); First-team All-Pac-12 (2011); 2× Second-team All-Pac-10 (2010, 2012)

Career NFL statistics
- Total tackles: 415
- Sacks: 5.0
- Forced fumbles: 1
- Fumble recoveries: 3
- Interceptions: 8
- Stats at Pro Football Reference

Timothy "T. J." McDonald Jr. (born January 26, 1991) is an American former professional football player who was a safety in the National Football League (NFL). He was selected by the St. Louis Rams in the third round of the 2013 NFL draft. He played college football for the USC Trojans.

== Early life ==
McDonald was born in Fresno, California. He attended Edison High School in Fresno, where he played high school football for the Edison Tigers. He was considered the second-best safety recruit in the nation by Rivals.com and Scout.com.

== College career ==
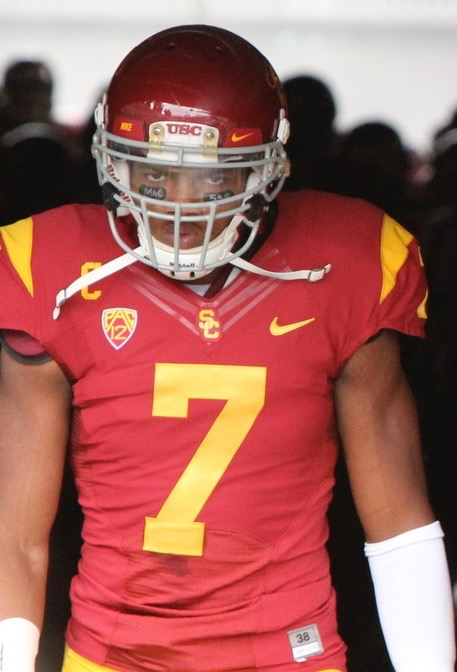
McDonald during his time at USC

McDonald enrolled at the University of Southern California, where he played for the USC Trojans football team from 2009 to 2012. As a freshman in 2009, McDonald was a backup safety and special teamer, recording seven tackles in 13 games. In 2010, he took over as a starter and had a team leading 89 tackles, three interceptions and a quarterback sack. He was a second-team All-Pacific-10 Conference selection. After a successful junior season in 2011, McDonald was highly decorated with awards. He was a first-team All-Pac-12 selection and received first-team All-American honors from Pro Football Weekly and The Sporting News.

As a senior, he enjoyed the best season of his career in 2012, leading the team with 112 tackles, including 7.0 for loss, a sack, and two interceptions, and was named second-team All-Pac-12.

== Professional career ==
External videos
- T.J. McDonald's NFL Combine Workout

Pre-draft measurables
Height	Weight	Arm length	Hand span	40-yard dash	10-yard split	20-yard split	20-yard shuttle	Three-cone drill	Vertical jump	Broad jump	Bench press
6 ft 2 1/2 in (1.89 m)	219 lb (99 kg)	33 1/8 in (0.84 m)	9 1/4 in (0.23 m)	4.59 s	1.60 s	2.68 s	4.20 s	6.89 s	40 in (1.02 m)	10 ft 11 in (3.33 m)	19 reps
All values from NFL Combine

=== St. Louis/Los Angeles Rams ===
==== 2013 ====
The St. Louis Rams selected McDonald in the third round (71st overall) of the 2013 NFL draft. He was the sixth safety selected in 2013.

On June 14, 2013, the Rams signed McDonald to a four-year, $3.79 million contract that includes a signing bonus of $679,740. McDonald entered training camp slated as the starting free safety. Head coach Jeff Fisher named him the starting free safety to start the regular season, alongside strong safety Darian Stewart.

He made his professional regular season debut in the St. Louis Rams' season-opener against the Arizona Cardinals and recorded five combined tackles and a pass deflection in their 27–24 victory. On September 26, 2013, McDonald recorded three combined tackles before exiting the Rams' 35–11 loss to the San Francisco 49ers after slightly fracturing his right leg. On September 27, 2013, the St. Louis Rams placed McDonald on injured reserve with a designation to return list. The injury sidelined him for six games (Weeks 5–10) and he would return to practice on November 21, 2013. He returned in Week 12 and made six combined tackles during a 42–22 win against the Chicago Bears. In Week 14, he collected a season-high eight combined tackles in the Rams' 30–10 loss at the Arizona Cardinals. On December 15, 2013, McDonald recorded five combined tackles, deflected a pass, and made his first career interception during a 27–16 victory at the New Orleans Saints in Week 15. He made his first career interception off a pass by Drew Brees that was originally intended for tight end Jimmy Graham on the Saints' first offensive play of the game. The following week, McDonald recorded six solo tackles and made his first career sack on quarterback Mike Glennon during a 23–13 win against the Tampa Bay Buccaneers in Week 16. McDonald finished his rookie season in 2013 with 53 combined tackles (45 solo), four pass deflections, a sack, and an interception in ten games and ten starts.

==== 2014 ====
McDonald entered training camp slated as the starting strong safety after Darian Stewart departed during free agency. Defensive coordinator Gregg Williams opted to move him to strong safety as McDonald was better suited for the position over Rodney McLeod. Head coach Jeff Fisher officially named McLeod and McDonald the starting safeties to begin the season.

In Week 5, he collected a season-high 11 combined tackles (ten solo) and broke up a pass during a 34–28 loss at the Philadelphia Eagles. On December 7, 2014, McDonald made four tackles and intercepted a pass by Robert Griffin III in the Rams' 24–0 victory at the Washington Redskins in Week 14. In Week 16, he tied his season-high of 11 combined tackles (nine solo) and sacked quarterback Eli Manning during a 37–27 loss to the New York Giants. He finished his second season with a career-high 105 combined tackles (84 solo), six pass deflections, two sacks, and an interception in 16 games and 16 starts.

==== 2015 ====
McDonald and McLeod entered training camp slated as the starting safeties. Head coach Jeff Fisher officially named them the starting duo to begin the season.

On September 27, 2015, McDonald collected a season-high eight combined tackles in the Rams' 12–6 loss to the Pittsburgh Steelers in Week 3. The following week, he recorded six combined tackles and a sack during a 24–22 win at the Arizona Cardinals in Week 4. He was inactive during the Rams' Week 9 loss at the Minnesota Vikings after injuring his foot the previous week. On December 9, 2015, the St. Louis Rams placed McDonald on injured reserve due to a shoulder injury that would require surgery. Head coach Jeff Fisher stated McDonald had been dealing with the injury throughout the entire season and was placed on injured reserve for his best interest of his sustained health for the future. He finished the 2015 season with 63 combined tackles (39 solo), a pass deflection, and a sack in 11 games and 11 starts.

==== 2016 ====
The Rams moved back to Los Angeles in 2016 after 21 seasons in St. Louis. Head coach Jeff Fisher retained McDonald as the starting strong safety to begin the regular season, along with free safety Maurice Alexander.

In Week 3, McDonald recorded three solo tackles and sacked quarterback Jameis Winston during a 37–32 victory at the Tampa Bay Buccaneers. The following week, he made one tackle, two pass deflections, and intercepted a pass by Carson Palmer during a 17–13 victory at the Arizona Cardinals in Week 4. On November 27, 2016, McDonald recorded a season-high seven solo tackles during a 49–21 loss at the New Orleans Saints in Week 12. On December 12, 2016, Los Angeles Rams' general manager Les Snead fired head coach Jeff Fisher and named special teams coordinator John Fassel the interim head coach for the last three games of the regular season. The Rams stood at 4–9 at the time and suffered a 42–14 home loss to the Atlanta Falcons the previous day. On January 1, 2017, he made five combined tackles, broke up a pass, and made an interception during the Rams' 44–6 loss to the Arizona Cardinals in Week 17. He finished his last season with the Rams with 64 combined tackles (50 solo), six pass deflections, a career-high two interceptions, and a sack in 16 games and 16 starts. He earned the 58th highest overall grade from Pro Football Focus, among the 89 qualifying safeties.

On March 29, 2017, it was reported that McDonald received an eight-game suspension for violating the league's substance abuse policy. The suspension was in relation to his arrest the previous year (see personal life). He also attended a meeting with the Miami Dolphins on the same day he received his suspension.

=== Miami Dolphins ===
==== 2017 ====
On March 31, 2017, the Miami Dolphins signed McDonald to a one-year, $1.34 million contract. During training camp, McDonald competed against Nate Allen to be the starting free safety. Head coach Adam Gase named McDonald the starting free safety for the regular season, along with strong safety Reshad Jones. Nate Allen was named his replacement while he served his eight-game suspension.

On September 2, 2017, the Dolphins signed McDonald to a four-year, $24 million contract extension with $10 million guaranteed and a signing bonus of $4.76 million.

In Week 10, he made his regular season debut as a member of the Dolphins and collected a season-high nine combined tackles in their 45–21 loss at the Carolina Panthers. On December 3, 2017, McDonald recorded three combined tackles, a pass deflection, and an interception in the Dolphins' 35–9 victory against the Denver Broncos in Week 13. He finished the 2017 season with 45 combined tackles (31 solo), three pass deflections, and an interception in eight games and eight starts. Pro Football Focus gave McDonald an overall grade of 74.3, ranking him 59th among all qualifying safeties in 2017.

=== 2018 ===
In 2018, McDonald started 14 games, recording 86 tackles, five passes defensed, and a career-high three interceptions.

On August 25, 2019, McDonald was released by the Dolphins.

== NFL career statistics ==
Year	Team	Games		Tackles				Fumbles			Interceptions					
Year	Team	GP	GS	Cmb	Solo	Ast	Sck	FF	FR	Yds	Int	Yds	Avg	Lng	TD	PD
2013	STL	10	10	53	45	8	1.0	0	0	0	1	-2	-2.0	-2	0	4
2014	STL	16	16	105	84	21	2.0	0	1	3	1	20	20.0	20	0	7
2015	STL	11	11	63	39	24	1.0	1	1	0	0	0	0.0	0	0	1
2016	LAR	16	16	64	50	14	1.0	0	0	0	2	0	0.0	0	0	6
2017	MIA	8	8	45	31	14	0.0	0	0	0	1	7	7.0	7	0	3
2018	MIA	14	14	86	63	23	0.0	0	1	0	3	41	13.6	31	0	5
Career		61	61	330	249	81	5.0	1	2	3	8	25	3.1	20	0	20

== Personal life ==
McDonald's father, Tim, also attended USC and played 13 years in the NFL. His brother, Tevin, briefly played for the Oakland Raiders in 2015.

On May 10, 2016, McDonald was arrested for DUI, and was charged on September 15, 2016. In January 2017, he pleaded guilty for his DUI along with possession of drugs. In the aftermath, McDonald was fined $390, received 36 months of probation, and was ordered to undergo 200 hours of community service in addition to attending a three-month alcohol program along with 18 narcotic anonymous classes. On March 29, 2017, while a free agent, McDonald was suspended for the first eight games of the 2017 season for violating the league's personal conduct policy, regarding his previous DUI charge.
