= Phillip Lolley =

American gridiron football coach (born 1954)

Biographical details
- Born: May 19, 1954 (age 72); Butler, Alabama, U.S.

Coaching career (HC unless noted)
- 1977: South Choctaw Academy (AL) (assistant)
- 1978–1982: Warrior Academy (AL)
- 1982–1984: Demopolis HS (AL) (DC)
- 1984–1987: Stevenson HS (AL)
- 1988–1998: North Jackson HS (AL)
- 1999: Auburn (S&C)
- 2000–2003: Auburn (LB/DB)
- 2004–2008: Auburn (dir. of NFL relations)
- 2009–2011: Auburn (CB)
- 2012–2013: Auburn (dir. of football ex. relations)
- 2014–2015: Edmonton Eskimos (LB)
- 2016: Saskatchewan Roughriders (LB)
- 2017: Hamilton Tiger-Cats (DC/LB)
- 2019: Edmonton Eskimos (DC)

Accomplishments and honors

Championships
- AHSAA Class 4A State (1993)

Phillip Lolley (born May 19, 1954) is an American gridiron football coach. He was recently the defensive coordinator for the Edmonton Elks of the Canadian Football League (CFL). Previously, he was assistant coach and administrator at Auburn University. He worked for the Tigers football program since being hired by Tommy Tuberville in 1999, until he temporarily retired in 2014.

== Career ==
=== Early coaching years ===
Lolley started his coaching career at the high school football level, receiving his first coaching position at South Choctaw Academy in Toxey, Alabama in 1977 before becoming the head coach at Warrior Academy in Eutaw the following season. He continued there until taking the position as defensive coordinator at Demopolis High School in 1982. In 1984, he was hired as head coach at Stevenson High School where he stayed until 1987. The following year, Lolley was hired by North Jackson High School, where he spent the next 10 years. The Chiefs enjoyed success under Lolley, advancing to the state playoffs every season including winning the 1993 Alabama High School Athletic Association (AHSAA) 4A state championship.

=== Auburn ===
In 1999, Lolley was hired by new head coach Tommy Tuberville to serve as a strength and conditioning coach at Auburn University. He received his first on-the-field coaching duties with the team in 2000 when he was promoted to coach outside linebackers under John Lovett before being reassigned to coach the defensive backs when new defensive coordinator Gene Chizik took over. During Lolley's tenure coaching Auburn's secondary, he helped the Tigers finish 13th in nation in scoring defense in 2002 and a 5th ranked defense in 2003. After a disappointing 2003 season, Auburn made some staff changes including reassigning Lolley to Director of NFL Relations (working with pro scouts and pro football teams), a position he served for the next five seasons.

When coach Tuberville was fired following the 2008 season, Lolley was one of four staff members that were retained by new head coach Gene Chizik to help with recruiting. On February 15, 2009, Chizik announced Lolley had been promoted to cornerbacks coach. He split responsibilities coaching the Tigers secondary with Tommy Thigpen who was hired from North Carolina to coach safeties.

While at Auburn, Lolley was on the coaching staff that won the 2011 Tostitos BCS National Championship Game. Following the 2011 season, Lolley return to an administrative job in the athletic department. In the Spring of 2014, Lolley retired from Auburn University.

=== CFL ===
Following his retirement from Auburn, Lolley joined the Edmonton Eskimos of the Canadian Football League as their linebackers coach, where he coached for two seasons. He spent the 2016 season with the Saskatchewan Roughriders, also as linebackers coach. Lolley joined the Hamilton Tiger-Cats for the 2017 CFL season as their defensive run game coordinator and linebackers coach, but was promoted to defensive coordinator after the team started the 2017 season 0–6. He was not retained for the 2018 season.

=== Players coached ===
Lolley coached Thorpe Award winner Carlos Rogers and Junior Rosegreen, who both went on to earn All-America honors in 2004. During his two years, he coached numerous future NFL players including Rogers, Rosegreen, Will Herring, Kevin Hobbs, Roderick Hood, Travaris Robinson, Horace Willis and Walter McFadden.

== Personal life ==
Lolley graduated with a bachelor's degree from the University of West Alabama in 1977 and a master's degree in 1981. He has a son, Brad, and daughter, Brittany.
