= The Sporting News College Football Coach of the Year =

American college football award

Silver Anniversary Awards
- Awarded for: the top collegiate football coach in the country
- Country: United States
- Presented by: The Sporting News

History
- First award: 1963
- Most recent: Curt Cignetti, Indiana

The Sporting News College Football Coach of the Year Award is an annual award given to the National Collegiate Athletic Association (NCAA) college football's national coach of the year. The Sporting News (formerly now known as Sporting News from 2002 to 2022) established the award beginning in 1963.

== TSN National Coach of the Year ==
In the long history of this award, only four coaches have won it twice: Darrell Royal with Texas in 1963 and 1969, Lou Holtz in 1977 with Arkansas and 1988 with Notre Dame, Dennis Erickson in 1992 with Miami and 2000 with Oregon State, and Gary Patterson in 2009 and 2014 with TCU. The only tie for the award came in 2013, with Auburn's Gus Malzahn and Duke's David Cutcliffe sharing honors.

== Winners ==
Year	Coach	School
1963	Darrell Royal	Texas
1964	Frank Broyles	Arkansas
1965	Duffy Daugherty	Michigan State
1966	Ara Parseghian	Notre Dame
1967	John Pont	Indiana
1968	Woody Hayes	Ohio State
1969	Darrell Royal	Texas
1970	John Ralston	Stanford
1971	Chuck Fairbanks	Oklahoma
1972	John McKay	USC
1973	Barry Switzer	Oklahoma
1974	Jerry Claiborne	Maryland
1975	Emory Bellard	Texas A&M
1976	Johnny Majors	Pittsburgh
1977	Lou Holtz	Arkansas
1978	Darryl Rogers	Michigan State
1979	John Mackovic	Wake Forest
1980	Vince Dooley	Georgia
1981	Hayden Fry	Iowa
1982	George MacIntyre	Vanderbilt
1983	Mike White	Illinois
1984	Jim Wacker	TCU
1985	Bo Schembechler	Michigan
1986	John Cooper	Arizona State
1987	Dick MacPherson	Syracuse
1988	Lou Holtz	Notre Dame
1989	None	None
1990	Bobby Ross	Georgia Tech
1991	Don James	Washington
1992	Dennis Erickson	Miami (FL)
1993	Terry Bowden	Auburn
1994	Rich Brooks	Oregon
1995	Gary Barnett	Northwestern
1996	Bruce Snyder	Arizona State
1997	Mike Price	Washington State
1998	Phillip Fulmer	Tennessee
1999	June Jones	Hawaii
2000	Dennis Erickson	Oregon State
2001	Ralph Friedgen	Maryland
2002	Jim Tressel	Ohio State
2003	Urban Meyer	Utah
2004	Tommy Tuberville	Auburn
2005	Joe Paterno	Penn State
2006	Jim Grobe	Wake Forest
2007	Mark Mangino	Kansas
2008	Nick Saban	Alabama
2009	Gary Patterson	TCU
2010	Chip Kelly	Oregon
2011	Bill Snyder	Kansas State
2012	Brian Kelly	Notre Dame
2013	Gus Malzahn; David Cutcliffe	Auburn; Duke
2014	Gary Patterson	TCU
2015	Dabo Swinney	Clemson
2016	James Franklin	Penn State
2017	Kirby Smart	Georgia
2018	Bill Clark	UAB
2019	Matt Rhule	Baylor
2020	Jamey Chadwell	Coastal Carolina
2021	Luke Fickell	Cincinnati
2022	Sonny Dykes	TCU
2023	Kalen DeBoer	Washington
2024	Curt Cignetti	Indiana

== See also ==
- Walter Camp Coach of the Year Award
- Paul "Bear" Bryant Award
- Eddie Robinson Coach of the Year
- Woody Hayes Trophy
- Associated Press College Football Coach of the Year Award
- AFCA Coach of the Year
- Home Depot Coach of the Year
- Liberty Mutual Coach of the Year Award
- George Munger Award
- Bobby Dodd Coach of the Year Award
