= Zac Etheridge =

American football player and coach (born 1988)

Arizona Cardinals
- Title: Cornerbacks coach

Personal information
- Born: July 6, 1988 (age 38); Troy, Alabama, U.S.

Career information
- Position: Safety (No. 4)
- High school: Charles Henderson (Troy, Alabama)
- College: Auburn (2007–2011)

Career history
- Penn State (2012) Graduate assistant; Georgia Tech (2013–2014) Graduate assistant; Western Carolina (2016–2017) Defensive backs coach & outside linebackers coach; Louisiana (2018) Defensive backs coach; Houston (2019–2020) Cornerbacks coach; Auburn (2021–2023) Associate head coach & secondary coach; Houston (2024) Defensive backs coach; Miami (FL) (2025) Defensive pass game coordinator & cornerbacks coach; Arizona Cardinals (2026–present) Cornerbacks coach
- Stats at Pro Football Reference

Zac Etheridge (born July 6, 1988) is an American professional football coach who is the cornerbacks coach for the Arizona Cardinals of the National Football League (NFL). He previously served as the defensive pass game coordinator and cornerbacks coach at the University of Miami in 2025.

Etheridge played college football at Auburn as a safety and was a team captain on their 2010 National Championship team. He previously served as an assistant coach at the University of Miami, University of Houston, Auburn University, University of Louisiana at Lafayette, Western Carolina University, Georgia Tech and Pennsylvania State University.

== Early life ==
Etheridge attended Charles Henderson High School in Troy, Alabama. He initially played basketball and baseball before ultimately deciding to focus on football. Etheridge grew up watching Auburn and Alabama football and began to dream of playing for Auburn after watching the programs 2004 team and becoming enamored with the programs sense of "family and tradition". Described as scrawny, Etheridge originally struggled in gaining attention from major programs but received an offer from Auburn after attending a camp ran by the team. On August 14, 2005, he would commit to play college football at Auburn University.

=== College ===
Etheridge would make an immediate impact at Auburn, starting 12 out of 13 games as a freshman in 2007 and earning Freshman All-American honors with 65 tackles. Etheridge remained a strong contributor for the Tigers as a sophomore, recording 75 tackles and one interception. In his junior season he suffered a neck injury while attempting a tackle in a game against Ole Miss. Following the injury he lacked control over his body and was ultimately diagnosed with torn neck ligaments and a broken vertebrae. The injury threatened to end Etheridge's playing career but he would return to the field for his senior season in 2010 after completing 9 months of physical therapy. In 2010, he was named a team captain, started all 14 games and would have three interceptions on the season including one in the first quarter of the Tigers national championship victory over Oregon. In 2012, Etheridge was awarded the James Owens Courage Award, which is awarded to an Auburn player who demonstrates "courage in the face of adversity".

== Coaching career ==
=== Early career ===
In 2012, Etheridge began his coaching career as a graduate assistant at Pennsylvania State University under head coach Bill O'Brien. From 2013 to 2014, Etheridge served as a graduate assistant at Georgia Tech.

=== Western Carolina ===
In 2016, Etheridge was hired by Western Carolina University as a defensive backs and outside linebackers coach.

=== Louisiana ===
In 2018, Etheridge was hired as the defensive backs coach at the University of Louisiana at Lafayette.

=== Houston ===
In 2019, Etheridge was hired as cornerbacks coach at the University of Houston.

=== Auburn ===
In 2021, Etheridge was hired as the associate head coach and secondary coach by his alma mater, Auburn University. In 2022, following the firing of Bryan Harsin for Hugh Freeze it was announced that Etheridge would remain on the new staff, making him and running backs coach Cadillac Williams the only coaches retained by Freeze.

=== Houston (second stint) ===
In 2024, Etheridge returned to the University of Houston as their defensive backs coach.

=== Miami ===
In 2025, Etheridge was hired as the defensive pass game coordinator and cornerbacks coach at the University of Miami under head coach Mario Cristobal. That year, the Hurricanes went the College Football National Championship game but lost to Indiana University Bloomington.

=== Arizona Cardinals ===
On February 16, 2026, Etheridge was hired by the Arizona Cardinals to serve as the team's cornerbacks coach under new head coach Mike LaFleur.
