= Tommy Thigpen =

American football player and coach (born 1971)

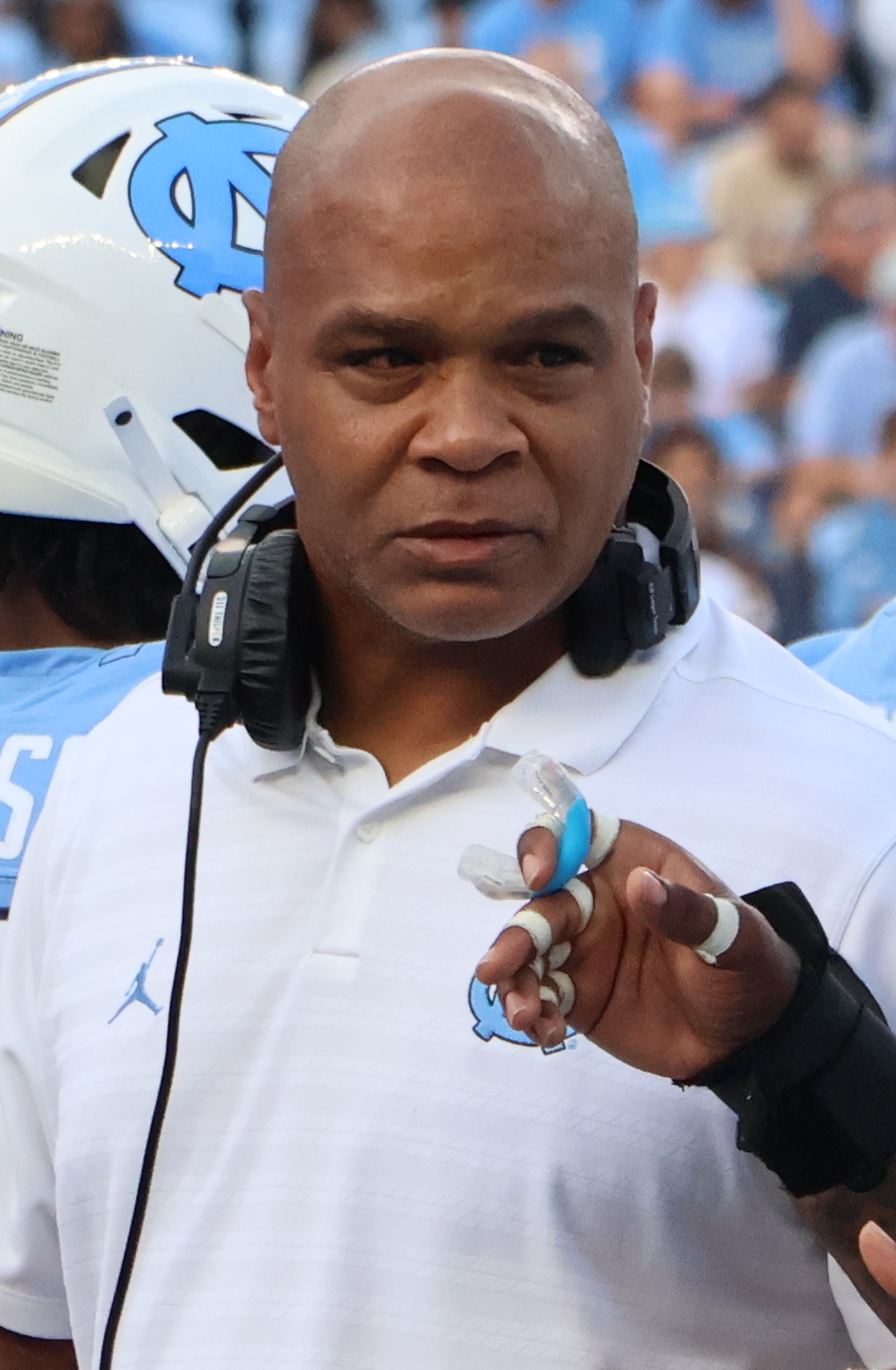
- Thigpen with North Carolina in 2024

Current position
- Title: Defensive coordinator & safeties coach
- Team: North Carolina Central
- Conference: MEAC

Biographical details
- Born: March 17, 1971 (age 55); El Dorado, Arkansas, U.S.

Playing career
- 1989–1992: North Carolina
- 1993: New York Giants
- 1995–1996: Barcelona Dragons
- Position: Linebacker

Coaching career (HC unless noted)
- 1998–1999: North Carolina (GA)
- 2000: Tennessee State (LB)
- 2001: Bowling Green (CB)
- 2002: Bowling Green (STC/CB)
- 2003: Illinois (CB)
- 2004: Illinois (LB)
- 2005–2008: North Carolina (LB)
- 2009–2011: Auburn (S)
- 2012: Auburn (LB)
- 2013–2017: Tennessee (LB)
- 2018: North Carolina (S)
- 2019–2021: North Carolina (co-DC/ILB)
- 2022–2024: North Carolina (co-DC/LB)
- 2025: Arlington Renegades (LB)
- 2026–present: North Carolina Central (DC/S)

Accomplishments and honors

Awards
- First-team All-ACC (1991); 2× Second-team All-ACC (1990, 1992)

Tommy Thigpen (born March 17, 1971) is an American college football coach and former player. He is currently the defensive coordinator & safeties coach for the North Carolina Central Eagles. He previously served the linebackers coach for the Dallas Renegades of the UFL. Prior to that, he spent 14 years as an assistant coach in the collegiate ranks, including a stint at Auburn University where he was part of the 2010 National Championship team. Thigpen played as a linebacker at the University of North Carolina and thereafter was drafted by the New York Giants of the National Football League (NFL). He also played for the Barcelona Dragons of the World League of American Football (WLAF).

== Playing career ==
Thigpen was born and raised in El Dorado, Arkansas. He played prep school football at Potomac High School in Dumfries, Virginia, where he was honored as a Parade All-American and Virginia Defensive Player of the Year. Thigpen was recruited to play college football at the University of North Carolina for head coach Mack Brown. Thigpen was a three-time All-ACC linebacker for the Tar Heels. He was co-captain of the 1992 team that went 9–3 and were Peach Bowl champions. Upon graduation, Thigpen played professionally for the New York Giants and Barcelona Dragons. He was drafted in the fifth round by the Giants in the 1993 NFL Draft.

== Coaching career ==
Thigpen began his coaching career as a UNC graduate assistant in 1998–1999 under Carl Torbush. He received his first full-time position the following season coaching linebackers at Tennessee State. In 2001–2002, he was hired by new head coach Urban Meyer as the cornerbacks coach and special team's coordinator at Bowling Green where he helped coach one of the Mid-American Conference's top defenses, leading the MAC in turnover margin in 2002. BGSU also finished second in the MAC in pass efficiency defense, while Thigpen's special teams also were impressive, blocking seven punts and one field goal.

When Meyer went to Utah in 2003, Thigpen was hired by Ron Turner as the cornerbacks coach at the University of Illinois. He spent the following season as the linebackers coach for the Fighting Illini and was one of two assistants to keep their job when Turner was fired. Although new coach Ron Zook asked him to stay on the staff, Thigpen decided to take the same position at his alma-mater, North Carolina, for the 2005 season. In his first four seasons coaching at Chapel Hill he tutored UNC's leading tacklers, including Durell Mapp who came to Carolina as a walk-on and finished with the second most tackles in the ACC and signed as an undrafted free agent with the Green Bay Packers. Thigpen was selected by the Atlantic Coast Conference to attend the 2008 Minority Coaches Forum.

On February 15, 2009, Gene Chizik announced Thigpen had been hired as the safeties coach at Auburn University. He will split responsibilities coaching the Tigers secondary with Phillip Lolley who was promoted to cornerbacks coach. After three seasons coaching the safeties, Thigpen took over as linebackers coach for the 2012 season.

After Chizik was fired by Auburn following the 2012 season and Thigpen was not retained by new coach Gus Malzahn (who had previously worked alongside Thigpen under Chizik), he was hired to coach linebackers at the University of Tennessee for new head coach Butch Jones.

Thigpen was a coach for Auburn when they won the 2011 BCS National Championship Game.

Thigpen was named one of the nation's top 25 recruiters in 2007 and 2009 by Rivals.com and in 2011 by 247Sports.com, ESPN and Rivals.com. He was awarded the 2011 Scout.com/FOXSports.com SEC Conference Recruiter of the Year. In 2014, he was named Rivals.com National Recruiter of the Year for his work on the University of Tennessee class of 2014.

He returned to Chapel Hill in 2018, when he was hired by head coach Larry Fedora to coach the linebackers. When Fedora was fired following the conclusion of the 2018 season, Thigpen was retained and elevated to co-defensive coordinator and inside linebackers coach by the returning Mack Brown, whom he had played under from 1989–1992. Thigpen's recruiting acumen and connection to Brown and the program were key reasons why he was retained by Brown after the coaching change.

== Personal life ==
Thigpen graduated with a bachelor's degree in political science from the University of North Carolina in 1993. He is married to the former Jacinda Webb and the couple have two daughters.
