= Chip Kelly =

American football coach (born 1963)

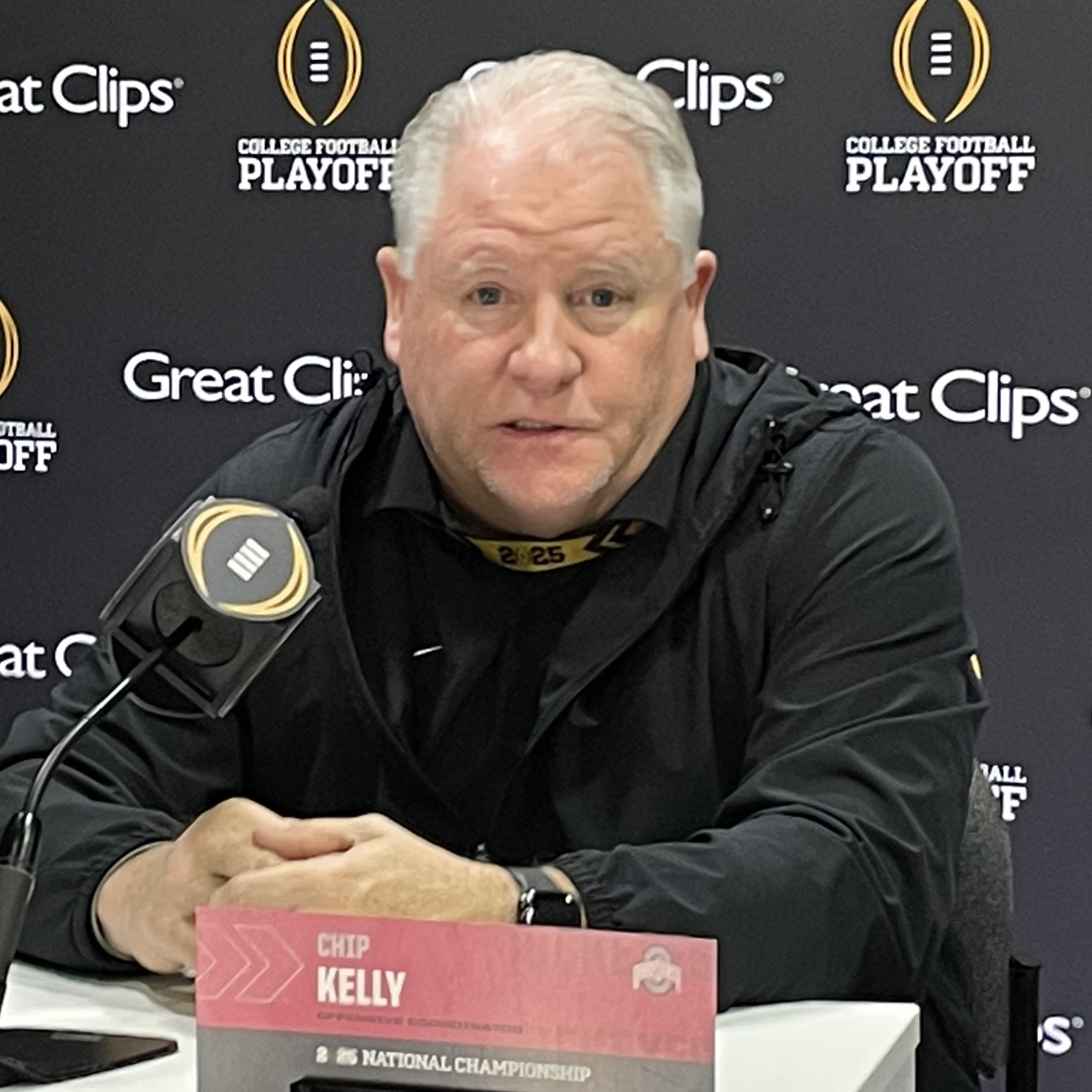
- Kelly in 2025

Current position
- Title: Offensive coordinator
- Team: Northwestern
- Conference: Big Ten

Biographical details
- Born: November 25, 1963 (age 62); Dover, New Hampshire, U.S.

Playing career
- 1981–1984: New Hampshire
- Position: Defensive back

Coaching career (HC unless noted)
- 1990: Columbia (DB/ST)
- 1991: Columbia (OLB/S)
- 1992: New Hampshire (RB)
- 1993: Johns Hopkins (DC)
- 1994–1996: New Hampshire (RB)
- 1997–1998: New Hampshire (OL)
- 1999–2006: New Hampshire (OC)
- 2007–2008: Oregon (OC)
- 2009–2012: Oregon
- 2013–2015: Philadelphia Eagles
- 2016: San Francisco 49ers
- 2018–2023: UCLA
- 2024: Ohio State (OC/QB)
- 2025: Las Vegas Raiders (OC)
- 2026–present: Northwestern (OC)

Head coaching record
- Overall: 81–41 (college); 28–35 (NFL)
- Bowls: 3–3
- Tournaments: 0–1 (NFL playoffs)

Accomplishments and honors

Championships
- As head coach 3 Pac-12 (2009–2011); 2 Pac-12 North Division (2011, 2012); NFC East Division (2013) As assistant coach CFP national champion (2024)

Awards
- Greasy Neale Award (2013); 2× Pac-10 Coach of the Year (2009, 2010); AP College Football Coach of the Year (2010); Eddie Robinson Coach of the Year (2010); Walter Camp Coach of the Year Award (2010); Sporting News Coach of the Year (2010); AFCA Coach of the Year (2010)

Charles Edward Kelly (born November 25, 1963) is an American football coach who is the offensive coordinator for Northwestern. He came to prominence as a college football head coach for the University of Oregon from 2009 to 2012, leading them to the 2011 BCS National Championship Game. Kelly's success led to a stint in the NFL, where he coached for four seasons, three with the Philadelphia Eagles (2013–2015) and one with the San Francisco 49ers (2016). After the NFL, Kelly returned to college in 2018 as the head football coach for UCLA, coaching for six seasons before leaving in 2024 to join Ohio State as their offensive coordinator. Kelly was hired by the NFL team, the Las Vegas Raiders, to be their offensive coordinator in 2025, but was fired after Week 12 following a 2–9 start to the season. He returned again to the collegiate ranks in 2026 with Northwestern.

== Early life and education ==
Kelly was born in Dover, New Hampshire. He attended Manchester Central High School, where he played football, ice hockey, and basketball. Kelly earned his Bachelor of Science in physical education from the University of New Hampshire in 1990.

Kelly played quarterback at Manchester Central High School and defensive back at the University of New Hampshire.

== Coaching career ==
=== Early coaching years ===
Kelly broke into the coaching ranks in 1990 for the Columbia University Lions, where he served as secondary and special teams coach for the freshman team. The next year, Kelly was outside linebackers and strong safeties coach for the varsity team. In 1992, he went to the University of New Hampshire — his alma mater — as the running backs coach. A year later, Kelly left to become the defensive coordinator at Johns Hopkins University for one season. He returned to his alma mater as the running backs coach for the next three seasons (1994–96). Kelly was just in time to devise a zone-blocking scheme for star Jerry Azumah. From 1995 through 1998, the speedy back raised the profile of UNH football as he rushed for what was then an FCS record 6,193 yards. Kelly changed to the offensive line coach for two seasons (1997–98).

Kelly was promoted to offensive coordinator at New Hampshire in 1999. The Wildcats' offenses averaged better than 400 yards per game of total offense in seven of his eight seasons. In 2004, the school broke 29 offensive school records; compiling 5,446 yards of total offense and scoring 40 or more points in seven games. Their best offensive output was in 2005 when the Wildcats finished second nationally in total offense (493.5 ypg), third in scoring (41.7 ppg), and fifth in passing (300.1 ypg). They finished the season with an 11–2 record.

Kelly was named the College Assistant Coach of the Year by the Gridiron Club of Greater Boston following the 2005 season in addition to being selected as "one of college football's hottest coaches" by American Football Monthly. In 2006, quarterback Ricky Santos won the Walter Payton Award under Kelly's guidance, after Santos finished second in balloting for the award in 2005.

Kelly, along with UNLV Rebels head coach Dan Mullen, former Winnipeg Blue Bombers offensive coordinator Gary Crowton, and Ohio State head coach Ryan Day, is part of the so-called "New Hampshire mafia" as they all have strong connections to New Hampshire.

=== Oregon (2007–2012) ===
==== Offensive coordinator ====
Kelly was hired as offensive coordinator at Oregon in February 2007. His potent spread offense attack was an instant success at Oregon.

In his first season as offensive coordinator at Oregon, the Ducks led the Pac-10 in scoring (38.15 ppg) and total offense (467.54 ypg), and also became the highest scoring team while amassing the most yards in the history of Oregon football. Prior to Kelly's arrival at Oregon, Dennis Dixon struggled in his first three seasons at quarterback. Under Kelly's guidance, Dixon was the Pac-10 Offensive Player of the Year and emerged as a Heisman Trophy candidate.

In 2008, the Ducks once again led the Pac-10 in scoring (41.9 ppg) and total offense (484.8 ypg), while breaking the school record marks set the previous season.

==== Head coach ====
On March 31, 2009, Oregon announced head coach Mike Bellotti would be promoted to athletic director, with Kelly promoted to head coach.

Kelly coached Oregon to BCS games in each of his four seasons as head coach: the 2010 Rose Bowl, 2011 BCS National Championship Game, 2012 Rose Bowl, and 2013 Fiesta Bowl. Kelly coached Oregon to three consecutive outright conference championships from 2009 to 2011 and a conference division title in 2012. Oregon won its second consecutive BCS bowl game after they defeated #5 Kansas State in the 2013 Fiesta Bowl. What may be considered the most important part of Kelly's résumé at Oregon, however, is that he posted undefeated records against the Ducks most hated rivals, the Oregon State Beavers and the Washington Huskies, something never before achieved by an Oregon coach.

Kelly was named the 2009 and 2010 Pac-10 Coach of the Year, 2010 Eddie Robinson Coach of the Year, 2010 Walter Camp Coach of the Year, 2010 Sporting News Coach of the Year, 2010 AFCA Coach of the Year Award, and 2010 Associated Press Coach of the Year.

Kelly helped the Ducks gain national attention in 2009 after an upset of the then #5 USC Trojans on October 31. Kelly became the first Pac-10 coach to win an outright conference championship in his first season, sending the Ducks to the Rose Bowl for the first time since 1995. The Ducks hoped to win their first Rose Bowl since 1917, but lost a close game to Ohio State. On December 7, 2009, Kelly was named Pac-10 Coach of the year. He was the second Ducks coach to earn the honor, the other being Rich Brooks (two times).

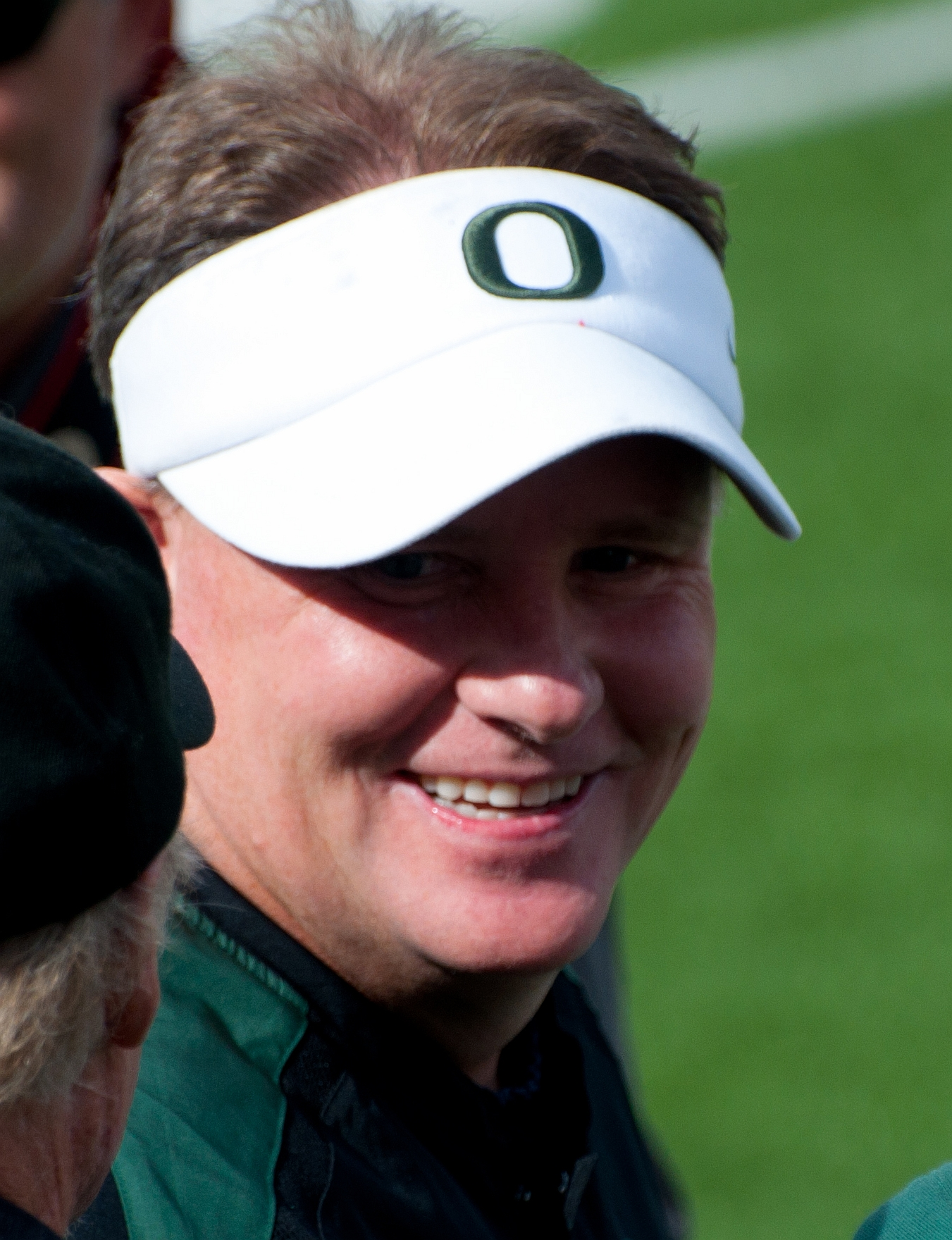
Kelly in 2010

Prior to the 2010 season, Kelly suspended Jeremiah Masoli for the season after the quarterback pleaded guilty to second-degree burglary charges, marking the second year in a row that a key player was suspended. Masoli was later dismissed from the team following an arrest for marijuana possession and several driving infractions. In early October, Kelly led the team to a #1 spot on the AP, Harris, and USA Today Coaches Poll, followed a few weeks later by a #1 BCS ranking. With a 37–20 win over the Oregon State Beavers on December 4, 2010, Kelly led the Ducks to a 9–0 finish in conference play, winning their second consecutive outright Pac-10 title. With Darron Thomas at quarterback and Doak Walker Award winner LaMichael James at running back, the Ducks averaged 49.3 points and 537.5 yards per game in the regular season. In December, following an undefeated 12–0 season and an end-of-season #2 BCS ranking, Oregon was selected to play the #1 Auburn Tigers in the BCS national championship game on January 10, 2011. The Tigers, out of the Southeastern Conference, were coached by Gene Chizik, and had the Heisman Trophy winner at quarterback in Cam Newton. The Ducks lost, 22–19, on a last-second, 19-yard field goal by Wes Byrum. It was the closest that a team from the Pacific Northwest has come to winning a share of the national championship since 1991. In recognition of his coaching achievements, Kelly received the Eddie Robinson Coach of the Year award, the Walter Camp Coach of the Year award and was named Pac-10 Coach of the Year for the second year running. Kelly also won the AP Coach of the Year.

The 2011 season began with the #3 Ducks facing the #4 LSU Tigers in the Cowboys Classic where they were defeated 40–27. Oregon won their next nine games, including a 53–30 blowout victory at #3 Stanford. A consecutive trip back to the BCS Championship appeared to be a strong possibility, but they were defeated 38–35 by #18 USC when an Oregon field goal attempt failed as time expired. The Ducks won their third straight Pac-12 championship title after defeating UCLA in the inaugural Pac-12 Football Championship Game. They represented the Pac-12 in the Rose Bowl and defeated #10 Wisconsin 45–38. It was their second Rose Bowl appearance in three years and their sixth overall. This was Oregon's third consecutive year in a BCS bowl game. The Ducks finished the season 12–2 (8–1 Pac-12) with a #4 final season ranking.

Oregon's all-time leading rusher LaMichael James decided to forgo his senior season in 2012 for the NFL and starting quarterback Darron Thomas, with a career starting record of 23–3, surprisingly also decided to leave early for the NFL. Led by redshirt freshman Marcus Mariota at quarterback and senior tailback Kenjon Barner, Oregon rolled to ten straight victories before finally falling to #14 Stanford in overtime 17–14 on November 17. Oregon had two opportunities to beat Stanford with a field goal but both attempts failed. Kelly's Ducks would rebound to beat #16 Oregon State in the Civil War for the fifth straight year and play #5 Kansas State in the 2013 Fiesta Bowl. The Ducks proved to be too much for Kansas State as they prevailed in a 35–17 victory in Oregon's fourth consecutive year in a BCS bowl game. The Ducks finished the season 12–1 (8–1 Pac-12) with a #2 ranking, putting them in the top five of the final season rankings for the third straight season.

==== NCAA sanctions ====
On April 16, 2013, The Oregonian reported that the University of Oregon had offered to put its football program on two years' probation in response to NCAA violations that allegedly took place during Kelly's tenure as head coach. On June 26, 2013, the NCAA Committee on Infractions issued its report concluding the investigation into Oregon's use of football scouting services. Oregon received three years of probation, reduction of scholarships, but no bowl ban. Kelly received an 18-month show-cause penalty, which would have made an immediate hiring by another NCAA institution difficult. This obstacle became moot, however, after Kelly spent the next four years coaching in the NFL.

==== NFL interest ====
New York Giants coach Tom Coughlin tried to hire Kelly as a quality control coach in 2006 when he was still the offensive coordinator at the University of New Hampshire. Kelly turned down the offer and shortly after became the offensive coordinator at the University of Oregon.

In the spring of 2009, Jon Gruden and Kelly spent several days in Tampa, Florida, discussing theories, progressions, and offensive strategies. In November 2010, he visited Pete Carroll at the Seattle Seahawks practice facility during an Oregon bye week.

In January 2012, the Tampa Bay Buccaneers interviewed Kelly for the head coach position, but he declined to take the job since he had "unfinished business to complete" with the Ducks.

During the 2012 offseason, Kelly met with New England Patriots head coach Bill Belichick to discuss how he operated the "blur" offense that Kelly ran at Oregon. New England had implemented the hurry up offense as early as 2007. Oregonian columnist John Canzano speculated that Kelly was waiting for the New England Patriots head coaching position to become available.

In early January 2013, numerous NFL teams expressed interest and Kelly was interviewed by the Buffalo Bills, the Cleveland Browns and Philadelphia Eagles. After a seven-hour meeting with the Browns followed by a nine-hour meeting with the Eagles, ESPN's Adam Schefter reported that Kelly initially decided to remain at Oregon. A week later, Kelly accepted the offer from Philadelphia and became head coach of the Eagles.

=== Philadelphia Eagles (2013–2015) ===
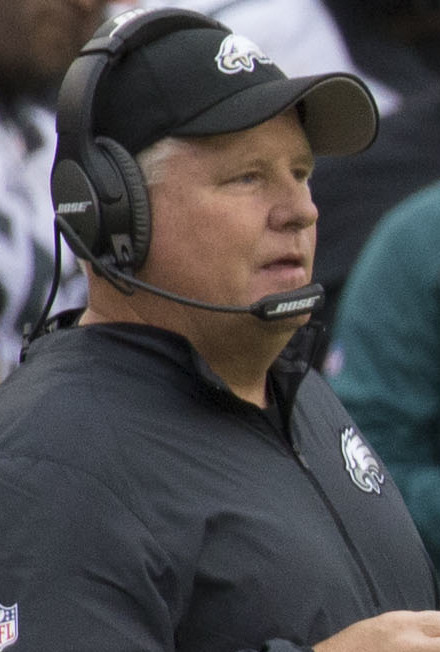
Kelly in 2015

Kelly agreed to terms with the Philadelphia Eagles to become the team's head coach on January 16, 2013. Although general manager Howie Roseman ran the team's drafts and free agency signings in his first two seasons with the team, Kelly had the final say over the 53-man roster. His predecessor, Andy Reid, also had the title and/or powers of general manager for most of his tenure.

In his first season, Kelly reversed the Eagles' fortunes of the previous year. Taking over a team that went 4–12 in 2012, Reid's last year, Kelly led the Eagles to a 10–6 record and the NFC East Division title, becoming just the second head coach in league history to win a division title in his first season in the NFL. They narrowly lost to the New Orleans Saints 26–24 in the Wild Card Round of the playoffs.

In his second season in Philadelphia, Kelly finished with an identical 10–6 record, despite key injuries to players like quarterback Nick Foles and linebacker DeMeco Ryans. However, unlike the previous season, the Eagles failed to make the playoffs in 2014.

On January 2, 2015, Eagles owner Jeffrey Lurie announced that Kelly would assume control of the 90-man roster (including authority over the draft and free agency), while Roseman would be "elevated" to the role of executive vice president of football operations, remaining in control of the salary cap and contracts. Soon afterward, the Eagles traded All-Pro running back LeSean McCoy to the Buffalo Bills for linebacker Kiko Alonso (who was a former Oregon Duck under Kelly) and Pro Bowl quarterback Nick Foles to the St. Louis Rams for quarterback Sam Bradford on March 10, 2015, under Kelly's request. Both trades were met with overwhelmingly negative reception from Eagles fans. He also signed former Cowboys running back and reigning rushing champion DeMarco Murray. Kelly also was criticized by current and former players and coaches for treating White and Black players differently, and for being a control freak who sees his players "as a commodity."

On December 29, 2015, with the Eagles at 6–9, Kelly was fired before the final regular season game, in a statement made by Lurie. It was quickly speculated that Kelly would be a candidate for several NFL head coach openings, and on January 7, it was reported that Kelly had met with the San Francisco 49ers about their head coaching position.

=== San Francisco 49ers (2016) ===
On January 14, 2016, Kelly was hired by the San Francisco 49ers as head coach. He entered the 2016 season as the 49ers' third coach in three seasons, following Jim Harbaugh and Jim Tomsula. In Kelly's first game with the 49ers, they defeated the Los Angeles Rams at Levi's Stadium during a 28–0 shutout victory. It was the first Week 1 shutout since 2009, when the Seattle Seahawks coincidentally shutout the Rams. However, the 49ers then went on a 13-game losing streak, with many speculations opening up about trouble between Kelly and general manager Trent Baalke by April 2016. In late November, there were also many rumors that Kelly would return to coach the Oregon Ducks after the Ducks finished the season with a 4–8 record, the team's first losing season since 2004, resulting in the firing of Ducks football coach Mark Helfrich. Those rumors ceased after the Ducks hired former South Florida Bulls coach Willie Taggart on December 7.

The 49ers finally got their second win of the season on December 24 in a narrow 22–21 road victory over the Rams, then lost their final game of the season on January 1, 2017, at home against the Seahawks. Following the narrow 25–23 loss to the Seahawks and having posted a 2–14 record for the season, Kelly and Baalke were both fired by the 49ers.

=== ESPN (2017) ===
On May 26, 2017, Kelly was hired by ESPN as a studio analyst for college football.

=== UCLA (2018–2024) ===
On November 25, 2017, Kelly was hired as the head football coach at UCLA. He had also interviewed for the Florida head coach position. In Kelly's first season in 2018, the Bruins began the year 0–5 for the first time since 1943. However, they later defeated USC to snap a three-game losing streak against their crosstown rivals. UCLA finished the season with a 3–9 record, their worst since going 2–7–1 in 1971. Their average home attendance of 51,164 was the school's smallest since averaging 49,825 in 1999.

The next season, the Bruins started 0–3, with losses to Cincinnati, San Diego State, and No. 5 Oklahoma, all by multiple scores. Under Kelly, the Bruins started 0–3 in back-to-back seasons for the first time since 1920–1921. The 0–3 start to the 2019 season gave Kelly the worst 15-game start as a UCLA football coach since Harry Trotter. However, when the Bruins played No. 19 Washington State the following week, they erased a 49–17 deficit and won 67–63. The 32-point comeback was the third-largest in FBS history.

Two weeks after the win over Washington State, the Bruins lost at home to Oregon State by a score of 48–31. This was only the Beavers' third road win over a Pac-12 opponent since 2014, and their largest road win over a Pac-12 opponent since their 49–17 win at California in 2013. The loss dropped the Bruins to a 1–5 record for the second consecutive year.

After an open date, the Bruins traveled to Stanford and defeated the Cardinal 34–16. UCLA got its first win over Stanford since 2008, snapping an 11-game losing streak against the Cardinal. The Bruins held the Cardinal to 198 total yards and just 55 rushing yards in the victory.

Following the Stanford victory, the 2019 Bruins defeated Arizona State 42–32 at the Rose Bowl. The Bruins led 42–10 heading into the fourth quarter. The Sun Devils were ranked No. 24 in the AP Poll at the time, and they were favored over the Bruins by three points at kickoff. UCLA then defeated Colorado 31–14 the next week, also at the Rose Bowl. The wins over Stanford, Arizona State, and Colorado gave the Bruins their first three-game winning streak since 2015.

After three straight losing seasons, UCLA was 8–4 in 2021. In 2022, they began the season 5–0 for the first time since 2013, and finished 9–4 (6–3 in the Pac-12) with a 37–35 loss to Pittsburgh in the Sun Bowl on a last-second field goal by the Panthers. The Bruins were ranked No. 21 in the final polls. After the season, Kelly signed a two-year contract extension that runs through 2027. In 2022, he was paid $5.77 million by UCLA for his role as head coach. The Bruins were 8–5 in 2023, winning the LA Bowl over Boise State for the program's first bowl win since 2015. It was the Bruins' third consecutive eight-win season, the second such streak in the program since 1988 under coach Terry Donahue.

On February 9, 2024, Kelly left UCLA after six seasons to become the offensive coordinator for the Ohio State Buckeyes. He was 35–34 at UCLA with one bowl victory; they were bowl-eligible only three times. Under Kelly, the Bruins averaged their four worst season home attendance numbers since moving to the Rose Bowl in 1982, including the 47,591 in his final season, which was also his second best figure at UCLA, behind his first season in 2018. He had reportedly been interviewing for coordinator positions in the NFL. His departure came after other schools had already filled their coaching vacancies, and shortly before UCLA's start of spring practice, with the school's move to the Big Ten Conference approaching.

=== Ohio State (2024–2025) ===
Kelly replaced Bill O'Brien as offensive coordinator, after O'Brien left Ohio State to become the head coach for Boston College. The move reunited Kelly and Ryan Day, who had served under Kelly at New Hampshire, Philadelphia, and San Francisco. Kelly helped lead Ohio State to winning a National Championship. Kelly's Buckeye offense faced four of College Football's top teams and defeated Tennessee, Oregon, Texas, and Notre Dame en route to the school's ninth National Championship.

=== Las Vegas Raiders (2025) ===
On February 4, 2025, the Las Vegas Raiders hired Kelly as their offensive coordinator under new head coach Pete Carroll. Following a 2–9 start to the season, Kelly was fired on November 23.

=== Northwestern (2026–present) ===
On December 30, 2025, Kelly was hired as offensive coordinator for Northwestern, replacing Zach Lujan, whose contract was not renewed after the end of the 2025 season.

During the 2026 season, the Wildcats' offense utilized a diverse playbook that included unorthodox formations and concepts. One such formation was dubbed the "Cover 2 offense" in which receivers were positioned 12–15 yards behind the line of scrimmage, taking inspiration from Canadian football. Kelly also heavily employed the Wing T offense, which he ran at New Hampshire. Despite the quirks, Kelly continued to incorporate elements of a traditional pro-style offense. Through the first seven games of the season, Northwestern had the second-best rushing offense in the Big Ten.

== Personal life ==
Kelly is reluctant to discuss his life outside of football. He lives in Winnetka, Illinois, but has a small, tight-knit group of friends in Manchester, New Hampshire, who never speak about him to reporters. ESPN blogger Ted Miller describes Kelly as being "funny, biting, pithy, strange, fiery and surprising when talking to reporters."

Kelly was married to Jennifer Jenkins from 1992 to 1999.

In 2009, Kelly responded to a season ticket holder's letter demanding a refund for his expenses after traveling to see Oregon's 19–8 loss to Boise State. That loss ended with Ducks running back LeGarrette Blount responding to a Bronco player's taunts by punching him in the face. Kelly replied to the man with a personal check written out for his travel costs (exactly $439); in response, the fan wrote Kelly a thank you note returning the original uncashed check.

== Awards ==
- 2009 Pac-10 Coach of the Year
- 2010 Pac-10 Coach of the Year
- 2010 Associated Press Coach of the Year
- 2010 Eddie Robinson Coach of the Year
- 2010 Walter Camp Coach of the Year
- 2010 Sporting News Coach of the Year
- 2010 AFCA Coach of the Year
- 2013 Maxwell Club Coach of the Year

== Head coaching record ==
=== College ===
Year	Team	Overall	Conference	Standing	Bowl/playoffs	Coaches^{#}	AP^{°}
Oregon Ducks (Pac-10/Pac-12 Conference) (2009–2012)
2009	Oregon	10–3	8–1	1st	L Rose^{†}	11	11
2010	Oregon	12–1	9–0	1st	L BCS NCG^{†}	3	3
2011	Oregon	12–2	8–1	T–1st (North)	W Rose^{†}	4	4
2012	Oregon	12–1	8–1	T–1st (North)	W Fiesta^{†}	2	2
Oregon:		46–7	33–3				
UCLA Bruins (Pac-12 Conference) (2018–2023)
2018	UCLA	3–9	3–6	5th (South)			
2019	UCLA	4–8	4–5	T–3rd (South)			
2020	UCLA	3–4	3–4	5th (South)			
2021	UCLA	8–4	6–3	T–2nd (South)	NC Holiday		
2022	UCLA	9–4	6–3	T–5th	L Sun	21	21
2023	UCLA	8–5	4–5	T–7th	W LA		
UCLA:		35–34	26–26				
Total:		81–41					
National championship Conference title Conference division title or championship game berth
^{†}Indicates BCS or CFP / New Years' Six bowl.; ^{#}Rankings from final Coaches Poll.; ^{°}Rankings from final AP Poll.

=== NFL ===
Team	Year	Regular season					Postseason			
Team	Year	Won	Lost	Ties	Win %	Finish	Won	Lost	Win %	Result
PHI	2013	10	6	0	.625	1st in NFC East	0	1	.000	Lost to New Orleans Saints in NFC Wild Card Game
PHI	2014	10	6	0	.625	2nd in NFC East	—	—	—	—
PHI	2015	6	9	0	.400	Fired	—	—	—	—
PHI Total		26	21	0	.553		0	1	.000	
SF	2016	2	14	0	.125	4th in NFC West, fired	—	—	—	—
SF Total		2	14	0	.125		0	0	.000	
Total		28	35	0	.452		0	1	.000	
