= South Choctaw Academy =

Segregation academy in Alabama

Location
- 5245 New Hope Rd; Toxey, Alabama 36921; United States; 31°54′44″N 88°19′12″W

Information
- School type: Private
- Established: 1969 (57 years ago)
- CEEB code: 012658
- NCES School ID: 01926186
- Grades: PK-12
- Enrollment: 252 (2016)
- Campus type: Rural
- Colors: Red, blue, and gray
- Nickname: Rebels
- Website: southchoctaw.org

South Choctaw Academy is a private, co-educational PK-12 school in Choctaw County, Alabama, near Toxey.

== History ==
South Choctaw Academy was founded in 1969 as a segregation academy.

During the 2015-2016 school year, the student body was all white.

== Academics ==
In 2018, ten percent of the graduating class won scholarships from the local electric company.
