= Kodi Burns =

American football player and coach (born 1988)

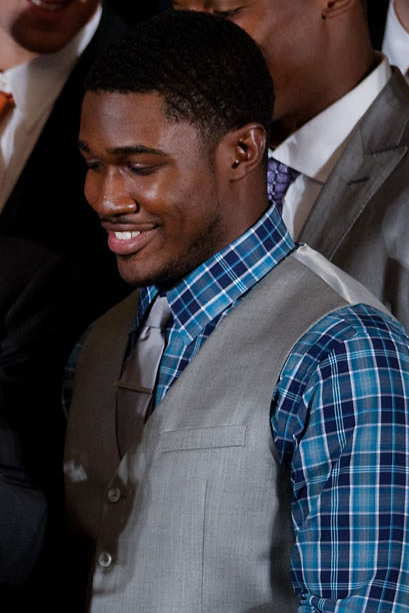
- Burns at the White House in 2011

Auburn Tigers
- Title: Associate head coach, co-offensive coordinator & wide receiver's coach

Personal information
- Born: December 24, 1988 (age 37); Fort Smith, Arkansas, U.S.
- Listed height: 6 ft 2 in (1.88 m)
- Listed weight: 207 lb (94 kg)

Career information
- High school: Northside (AR)
- College: Auburn

Career history
- Arkansas State (2012) Graduate assistant; Auburn (2013) Graduate assistant; Samford (2014) Running backs coach; Middle Tennessee (2015) Wide receivers coach; Auburn (2016–2018) Co-offensive coordinator & wide receivers coach; Auburn (2019–2020) Passing game coordinator & wide receivers coach; Tennessee (2021) Wide receivers coach; New Orleans Saints (2022–2024) Wide receivers coach; South Florida (2025) Assistant head coach, co-offensive coordinator & wide receivers coach; Auburn (2026–present) Associate head coach, co-offensive coordinator & wide receivers coach

Awards and highlights
- BCS national champion (2011)

Kodi Burns (born December 24, 1988) is an American football coach who is currently an assistant coach for Auburn Tigers football. He was previously the wide receivers coach at the University of Tennessee, University of South Florida, and at Auburn University where he played college football, first as a quarterback and later as a wide receiver, winning a national championship in 2010.

== Early life ==
As a high school senior in 2007 at Northside High School in Fort Smith, Arkansas, Burns accounted for 2,738 yards and 36 touchdowns, rushing and passing. He was named All-State by the Arkansas Activities Association and was ranked as the nation's #8 "Dual-Threat" quarterback by Rivals.com. Burns was recruited heavily by Tommy Tuberville while he was the coach at Auburn and by Gus Malzahn while he was at Arkansas. Malzahn would later be his coach at Auburn and on his coaching staff at Arkansas State.

== College career ==
Burns was a key part of Tommy Tuberville's offense in 2007. In the 2007 Chick-fil-A Bowl, Burns ran for a 10-yard touchdown to win in OT for a 23–20 win. After the game Burns was projected by the media and fans to be the starter in 2008, because 2007 was Brandon Cox's senior year. Burns started seven games at quarterback for the Tigers in 2008. He was moved to wide receiver prior to the 2009 season. Burns ran for a touchdown in the wildcat against Arkansas State; Auburn won the game 56–26. Against Ole Miss, Burns was in the wildcat and threw a touchdown pass to Cam Newton. Burns also had a key reception in the National Championship Game against Oregon. Newton found Burns on a long 35-yard touchdown pass, where Burns put Auburn up 7–3 which led to Auburn's win 22–19.

== Coaching career ==
=== Arkansas State ===
In January 2012, Burns joined Gus Malzahn's staff at Arkansas State as an offensive graduate assistant.

=== Auburn (first stint) ===
Gus Malzahn was hired to be the Auburn head coach after Auburn went 3-9 (0-8), the worst since a 3-8 1998 season. Burns returned to his alma mater as a graduate assistant on Malzahn's staff.

=== Samford ===
On May 12, 2014, it was announced that Burns would coach running backs at Samford University in Birmingham, Alabama.

=== Middle Tennessee ===
On February 10, 2015, Burns was hired as the wide receivers coach at Middle Tennessee State University.

=== Arizona State ===
On January 4, 2016, it was announced that Burns would be coaching the running backs at Arizona State University.

=== Auburn (second stint) ===
On February 15, 2016, it was announced that Burns had been hired on as Gus Malzahn's WR coach at Auburn University, replacing Dameyune Craig nearly 24 hours after Craig's official departure to Louisiana State University (LSU).

On December 13, 2020, it was announced that Auburn head coach Malzahn was being fired, along with his entire staff (including Burns).

=== Tennessee ===
On February 8, 2021, Burns was hired as the wide receivers coach at the University of Tennessee. He coached Velus Jones Jr. had 800+ receiving yds and 1,722 All-purpose yds, which was second most in UT single-season history; (selected 3rd-round NFL Draft), Cedric Tillman had 1,000+ receiving yds, 12 receiving TDs that season; (3rd-round NFL pick), and Jalin Hyatt (later Biletnikoff Award winner; 3rd-round NFL pick).

=== New Orleans Saints ===
On February 21, 2022, Burns was hired for his first NFL coaching role, becoming the wide receivers coach for the New Orleans Saints. On November 16, 2024, it was announced that Saints head coach Dennis Allen had released three offensive staff members (including Burns).

=== South Florida ===
In December 2024, Burns was hired by South Florida as assistant head coach, co-offensive coordinator, and wide receivers coach under head coach Alex Golesh Working alongside offensive coordinator Joel Gordon, Burns helped direct a high-tempo offense that ranked third nationally in total offense in 2025. Under Burns’s coaching, Keshaun Singleton recorded 62 receptions for 848 yards and 8 touchdowns in his first season with the Bulls—ranking third in the American Conference in receiving touchdowns. The wide receiver unit played a key role in USF setting single-season program records for passing yards and total offense in 2025.

=== Auburn (third stint) ===
In December of 2025, Burns followed Golesh back to his alma mater, where he was named Associate Head Coach, co-offensive coordinator, and wide receivers coach on Golesh's staff on the Plains.
