= Mary Monroe (author) =

American fiction writer

- Born: 1949 (age 76–77); Toxey, Alabama
- Occupation: Author
- Writing career
- Period: 1985–present
- Genres: African-American Literature and Fiction
- Website: www.marymonroe.org

Mary Monroe is a New York Times bestselling African-American fiction author. Her first novel, The Upper Room, was published by St. Martin's Press in 1985. She is best known for her novel God Don't Like Ugly (originally published by Dafina Books in Fall 2000), and the series revolving around the characters first introduced in this book.

== Biography ==
Mary Monroe was born on December 12, 1949, and is the third of four children, born in Toxey, Alabama. She spent the first part of her life in Alabama and Ohio, moving to Richmond, California, in 1973. She was the first person in her family to graduate from high school. She is a self-taught writer, as she never attended college or took any writing classes.

Her first novel, The Upper Room, was published by St. Martin's Press in New York in 1985, and in London by Allison and Busby in 1986. Her second novel, God Don't Like Ugly, was published in 2000 by Kensington Books, and in 2001 won a PEN Oakland Award for Best Fiction of the Year.

A successful author and mother of two children, Monroe currently resides in Oakland, where she continues to write bestselling novels. Monroe is divorced, she travels the world and writes books based on life experiences and the people around her.

== Awards ==
- PEN Oakland/Josephine Miles Literary Award in 2001.
- Best Southern Author Award for Gonna Lay Down My Burdens in 2004.
- Maya Angelou Lifetime Achievement Award in 2016
- J. California Cooper Memorial Award in 2017
- The New York Times Best Seller list for the God Don't Like Ugly Series in September 2006

== Bibliography ==
=== Novels ===
- One House Over: The Neighbors #1
- The Devil You Know
- Never Trust A Stranger
- Can You Keep A Secret?
- Every Woman's Dream
- Bad Blood
- Family Of Lies
- Red Light Wives

==== Kensington Books ====
- The Upper Room
- God Don't Like Ugly
- Gonna Lay Down My Burdens
- God Still Don't Like Ugly
- Red Light Wives
- In Sheep's Clothing
- God Don't Play
- Borrow Trouble
- Deliver Me From Evil
- Company We Keep
- She Had it Coming
- God Ain't Blind
- God Ain't Through Yet
- Mama Ruby
- God Don't Make Mistakes
- Lost Daughters

== Reviews ==
=== God Don't Like Ugly ===
Some believe by using an innocent young girl's voice, Monroe provides a hopeful tone for a dark sequence of events. Monroe's writing of the characters in this novel is strong, and is the major reason for emotional investment in the book.

=== She Had It Coming ===
A common review is that the main picture Monroe draws through this novel is how secrets can destroy friendships. Monroe creates a chain of deceptions and betrayals, some of which are believable and others that may cause raised eyebrows.

=== Deliver Me From Evil ===
Some critics think the narration by Patricia Floyd provides a different outlook on the characters, who just from their actions are made to seem greedy, ignorant, or any other number of off-putting adjectives. Monroe leaves it unclear as to any details about the titular evil, providing much room for interpretation on the part of the audience. While others feel the narrative is fun but it has a repetitive exposition. The critics agree that the characters are nasty in nature and that readers are in for a surprise.

=== God Don't Make No Mistakes ===
A critical review is that Monroe uses humor to add new dimensions to the lives of ordinary people, making them seem interesting to readers.
