= 2010 Oregon Ducks football team =

American college football season

2010 Oregon Ducks football

Pac-10 champion

BCS National Championship Game, L 19–22 vs. Auburn
- Conference: Pacific-10 Conference

Ranking
- Coaches: No. 3
- AP: No. 3
- Record: 12–1 (9–0 Pac-10)
- Head coach: Chip Kelly (2nd season)
- Offensive coordinator: Mark Helfrich (2nd season)
- Offensive scheme: No-huddle spread option
- Defensive coordinator: Nick Aliotti (14th season)
- Base defense: Hybrid 3–4
- Captain: Game captains
- Home stadium: Autzen Stadium

Uniform

2010 Pacific-10 Conference football standings
	Conf.			Overall
Team	W		L	W		L
No. 3 Oregon $	9	–	0	12	–	1
No. 4 Stanford %	8	–	1	12	–	1
USC †	5	–	4	8	–	5
Washington	5	–	4	7	–	6
Arizona	4	–	5	7	–	6
Arizona State	4	–	5	6	–	6
Oregon State	4	–	5	5	–	7
California	3	–	6	5	–	7
UCLA	2	–	7	4	–	8
Washington State	1	–	8	2	–	10
$ – BCS representative as conference champion; % – BCS at-large representative; † – USC ineligible for championship and post-season due to NCAA sanctions; Rankings from AP Poll

The 2010 Oregon Ducks football team represented the University of Oregon in the 2010 NCAA Division I FBS football season. The team was led by Chip Kelly in his second season as a head coach. The Ducks played their home games at Autzen Stadium for the 44th straight year.

On October 16, 2010, Oregon was ranked number 1 in the AP Poll for the first time in program history. On October 31, 2010, after beating USC and moving to 8–0, Oregon achieved the number 1 ranking in the BCS rankings. The Ducks repeated as Pac-10 Conference champions and finished the regular season undefeated with a school-record 12 wins, the first undefeated and untied regular season in the school's 117-year football history. They earned a berth in the BCS National Championship Game, which they narrowly lost to Auburn on a field goal as time expired. It was the closest that a team from the Pacific Northwest has come to winning a share of the national championship since Washington was crowned national champion by most outlets in 1991.

In recognition of the team's performance during the season, Kelly received the Eddie Robinson Award and the Associated Press College Football Coach of the Year Award. Running back LaMichael James, who finished third in balloting in for the Heisman Trophy, received the Doak Walker Award.

== Before the season ==
The team was plagued with numerous off-field incidents during the off-season, which saw nine separate players either be dismissed from the team or be involved in criminal activities starting in January 2010. On March 12, 2010, Coach Chip Kelly suspended starting quarterback Jeremiah Masoli for the 2010 season for his role in an Oregon fraternity house theft that resulted in a guilty plea to misdemeanor second-degree burglary, and left the option for Masoli to redshirt in 2010 and return to the Ducks in 2011. On the same day Kelly also suspended LaMichael James and Rob Beard for the season opener after pleading guilty to harassment. The trend continued into the summer time, as on June 7, 2010 suspended Oregon QB, Jeremiah Masoli, was arrested for a second time for marijuana possession and driving with a suspended license. Two days later Masoli was dismissed from the football program. with the Ducks naming sophomore Darron Thomas the starting quarterback.

On March 19, 2010, athletic director Mike Bellotti left Oregon to join the cable sports network, ESPN, as a football analyst.

=== Recruiting ===
College recruiting
Name	Hometown	School	Height	Weight	40^{‡}	Commit date
Lache Seastrunk; RB	Temple, Texas	Temple HS	5 ft 11 in (1.80 m)	188 lb (85 kg)	4.4	Jan 27, 2010
Lache Seastrunk; RB	Recruit ratings: Scout: Rivals: (83)					
Curtis White; TE	Eugene, Oregon	Henry D. Sheldon HS	6 ft 5 in (1.96 m)	240 lb (110 kg)	4.8	Feb 29, 2008
Curtis White; TE	Recruit ratings: Scout: Rivals: (81)					
Dior Mathis; CB	Detroit, Michigan	Cass Technical HS	5 ft 9 in (1.75 m)	170 lb (77 kg)	4.4	Jan 9, 2010
Dior Mathis; CB	Recruit ratings: Scout: Rivals: (81)					
Ricky Heimuli; DT	Salt Lake City, Utah	Brighton HS	6 ft 4 in (1.93 m)	283 lb (128 kg)	4.9	Feb 3, 2010
Ricky Heimuli; DT	Recruit ratings: Scout: Rivals: (81)					
Bryan Bennett; QB	Encino, California	Crespi Carmelite HS	6 ft 3 in (1.91 m)	185 lb (84 kg)	4.6	Jun 18, 2009
Bryan Bennett; QB	Recruit ratings: Scout: Rivals: (77)					
Erick Dargan; S	Pittsburg, California	Pittsburg Senior HS	6 ft 1 in (1.85 m)	195 lb (88 kg)	4.7	Feb 3, 2010
Erick Dargan; S	Recruit ratings: Scout: Rivals: (77)					
Nick Rowland; OG	Peoria, Arizona	Centennial HS	6 ft 5 in (1.96 m)	298 lb (135 kg)	5.2	Oct 7, 2009
Nick Rowland; OG	Recruit ratings: Scout: Rivals: (77)					
Ryan Clanton; OT	San Francisco, California	City College of San Francisco	6 ft 6 in (1.98 m)	305 lb (138 kg)	5.1	Nov 30, 2009
Ryan Clanton; OT	Recruit ratings: Scout: Rivals: (–)					
Dontae Williams; RB	Houston, Texas	Aldine HS	5 ft 11 in (1.80 m)	204 lb (93 kg)	4.5	Nov 18, 2009
Dontae Williams; RB	Recruit ratings: Scout: Rivals: (80)					
Keanon Lowe; ATH	Portland, Oregon	Jesuit HS	5 ft 10 in (1.78 m)	170 lb (77 kg)	4.4	Jan 24, 2010
Keanon Lowe; ATH	Recruit ratings: Scout: Rivals: (79)					
Benjamin Ansong; CB	Chicago, Illinois	Amundsen HS	5 ft 8 in (1.73 m)	150 lb (68 kg)	4.2	Feb 2, 2010
Benjamin Ansong; CB	Recruit ratings: Rivals: (74)					
Josh Huff; RB	Houston, Texas	Chester W Nimitz HS	5 ft 10 in (1.78 m)	186 lb (84 kg)	4.4	Feb 3, 2010
Josh Huff; RB	Recruit ratings: Scout: Rivals: (76)					
James Scales; CB	Greensboro, North Carolina	Central Carolina Sports Academy	5 ft 10 in (1.78 m)	180 lb (82 kg)	4.7	Sep 11, 2009
James Scales; CB	Recruit ratings: Scout: Rivals: (78)					
Issac Dixon; OLB	Miami	Monsignor Pace HS	6 ft 0 in (1.83 m)	195 lb (88 kg)	4.5	Oct 8, 2009
Issac Dixon; OLB	Recruit ratings: Scout: Rivals: (77)					
Derrick Malone; S	Colton, California	Colton HS	6 ft 2 in (1.88 m)	195 lb (88 kg)	4.5	Dec 6, 2009
Derrick Malone; S	Recruit ratings: Scout: Rivals: (77)					
Troy Hill; CB	Ventura, California	St. Bonaventure HS	5 ft 11 in (1.80 m)	163 lb (74 kg)	4.5	Dec 9, 2009
Troy Hill; CB	Recruit ratings: Scout: Rivals: (76)					
Terrance Mitchell; CB	Sacramento, California	Burbank HS	5 ft 11 in (1.80 m)	168 lb (76 kg)	4.6	May 27, 2009
Terrance Mitchell; CB	Recruit ratings: Scout: Rivals: (76)					
Tony Washington; DE	Rancho Cucamonga, California	Los Osos HS	6 ft 4 in (1.93 m)	233 lb (106 kg)	4.7	Nov 1, 2009
Tony Washington; DE	Recruit ratings: Scout: Rivals: (76)					
Hroniss Grasu; C	Encino, California	Crespi Carmelite HS	6 ft 3 in (1.91 m)	255 lb (116 kg)	4.9	Jul 19, 2009
Hroniss Grasu; C	Recruit ratings: Scout: Rivals: (75)					
Isaac Remington; DE	Phoenix, Arizona	Phoenix CC	6 ft 6 in (1.98 m)	265 lb (120 kg)	NA	Dec 13, 2009
Isaac Remington; DE	Recruit ratings: Scout: Rivals: (–)					
Brandon Williams; TE	Joliet, Illinois	Joliet JC	6 ft 4 in (1.93 m)	240 lb (110 kg)	4.5	Nov 15, 2009
Brandon Williams; TE	Recruit ratings: Scout: Rivals: (–)					
Alejandro Maldonado; K	Colton, California	Colton HS	5 ft 11 in (1.80 m)	185 lb (84 kg)	NA	Jan 31, 2010
Alejandro Maldonado; K	Recruit ratings: Scout: Rivals: (73)					
Eric Dungy; S	Tampa, Florida	Plant Senior HS	6 ft 1 in (1.85 m)	183 lb (83 kg)	NA	Jan 31, 2010
Eric Dungy; S	Recruit ratings: Scout: Rivals: (40)					
Drew Howell; LS	Tehachapi, California	Tehachapi HS	6 ft 2 in (1.88 m)	210 lb (95 kg)	NA	Nov 23, 2009
Drew Howell; LS	Recruit ratings: Scout: Rivals: (40)					
Overall recruit ranking: Scout: 13 Rivals: 13 ESPN: 22
‡ Refers to 40-yard dash; Note: In many cases, Scout, Rivals, 247Sports, On3, and ESPN may conflict in their listings of height, weight and 40 time.; In these cases, the average was taken. ESPN grades are on a 100-point scale.; Sources: "Oregon Football Commitment List 2010". Rivals.; "Oregon College Football Recruiting Commits 2010". Scout.; "Oregon Ducks Commits 2010". ESPN.; "Scout.com Team Recruiting Rankings". Scout.; "2010 Team Ranking". Rivals.com.

== Schedule ==
Date	Time	Opponent	Rank	Site	TV	Result	Attendance	Source
September 4	12:30 p.m.	New Mexico*	No. 11	Autzen Stadium; Eugene, OR	OSN	W 72–0	59,104	
September 11	4:00 p.m.	at Tennessee*	No. 7	Neyland Stadium; Knoxville, TN	ESPN2	W 48–13	102,035	
September 18	3:15 p.m.	Portland State*	No. 5	Autzen Stadium; Eugene, OR	OSN	W 69–0	58,086	
September 25	7:30 p.m.	at Arizona State	No. 5	Sun Devil Stadium; Tempe, AZ	FSN	W 42–31	60,326	
October 2	5:00 p.m.	No. 9 Stanford	No. 4	Autzen Stadium; Eugene, OR (rivalry, College GameDay)	ABC/ESPN2	W 52–31	59,818	
October 9	2:00 p.m.	at Washington State	No. 3	Martin Stadium; Pullman, WA	OSN	W 43–23	24,768	
October 21	6:00 p.m.	UCLA	No. 1	Autzen Stadium; Eugene, OR	ESPN	W 60–13	59,372	
October 30	5:00 p.m.	at No. 24 USC	No. 1	Los Angeles Memorial Coliseum; Los Angeles, CA (rivalry, College GameDay)	ABC/ESPN3	W 53–32	88,726	
November 6	12:30 p.m.	Washington^{†}	No. 1	Autzen Stadium; Eugene, OR (rivalry)	ABC/ESPN2	W 53–16	60,017	
November 13	4:30 p.m.	at California	No. 1	California Memorial Stadium; Berkeley, CA	Versus	W 15–13	65,963	
November 26	4:00 p.m.	No. 21 Arizona	No. 1	Autzen Stadium; Eugene, OR	ESPN	W 48–29	59,990	
December 4	12:30 p.m.	at Oregon State	No. 1	Reser Stadium; Corvallis, OR (Civil War, College GameDay)	ABC	W 37–20	46,469	
January 10, 2011	5:30 p.m.	vs. No. 1 Auburn*	No. 2	University of Phoenix Stadium; Glendale, AZ (BCS National Championship Game)	ESPN	L 19–22	78,603	
*Non-conference game; ^{†}Homecoming; Rankings from AP Poll released prior to the game; All times are in Pacific time

== Roster ==
On March 12, 2010, it was announced that 2008–09 starting quarterback Jeremiah Masoli would be suspended for the entire season following his guilty plea for burglary. He was dismissed from the football program on June 9 for an arrest while on his current suspension.

On November 10, 2010, back-up quarterback Nate Costa was ruled out for the season with a knee injury.

Darron Thomas took over as QB and played against Cam Newton in the BCS National Championship game.

== Rankings ==
Ranking movements Legend: ██ Increase in ranking ██ Decrease in ranking ( ) = First-place votes
	Week															
Poll	Pre	1	2	3	4	5	6	7	8	9	10	11	12	13	14	Final
AP	11	7	5	5	4	3	2 (15)	1 (39)	1 (44)	1 (49)	1 (49)	1 (38)	1 (37)	1 (36)	2 (23)	3
Coaches	11	8	6	6	4	3	2 (6)	1 (42)	1 (50)	1 (51)	1 (50)	1 (46)	1 (48)	1 (46)	1 (34)	3
Harris	Not released						2 (23)	1 (77)	1 (91)	1 (92)	1 (93)	1 (65)	1 (68)	1 (70)	2 (38)	Not released
BCS	Not released							2	2	1	1	1	1	2	2	Not released

== Game summaries ==
=== New Mexico ===
	1	2	3	4	Total
Lobos	0	0	0	0	0
#11 Ducks	28	31	6	7	72

In the first-ever meeting between Oregon and New Mexico on the football field, the Ducks were victorious 72–0. With first-string tailback LaMichael James serving a one-game suspension by Chip Kelly, Kenjon Barner received the majority of carries offensively for the Ducks. Barner scored 5 touchdowns with only limited carries in the second quarter. Meanwhile, second-string punt returner Cliff Harris tied an Oregon Duck school record by returning the first two punts of his career for touchdowns. After the game, the Pac-10 announced Barner and Harris as players of the week.

=== Tennessee ===
	1	2	3	4	Total
#7 Ducks	3	10	14	21	48
Volunteers	6	7	0	0	13

Oregon faced Tennessee for the first time, with the teams playing at Neyland Stadium. The game was delayed for over an hour to lightning in the Knoxville area. The Volunteers jumped to a 6–0 lead until the first quarter delay. After the delay, the Ducks fell behind even more, 13–3. Despite falling behind early, Oregon took control in the 2nd half to win by 5 touchdowns.

=== Portland State ===
	1	2	3	4	Total
Vikings	0	0	0	0	0
#5 Ducks	21	24	24	0	69

On September 18, Oregon defeated Portland State 69–0. LaMichael James rushed for 227 yards on 14 carries and scored two touchdowns. Quarterback Darron Thomas completed 4 passing touchdowns with one interception and one fumble. No Ducks received Pac-10 player of the week honors for their performance, however.

=== Arizona State ===
	1	2	3	4	Total
#5 Ducks	14	14	14	0	42
Sun Devils	7	17	7	0	31

On September 25, 2010, Oregon defeated Arizona State in Tempe, Arizona by a score of 42–31. Though a night game, kickoff temperatures for the game soared at 100 °F (38 °C). Arizona State took an early lead in the game, but Oregon responded with a season-high 4 team interceptions. The Sun Devils held primary running back LaMichael James to only 114 rushing yards, but the total was enough to move James past the 2,000 yard mark for his career. Oregon quarterback Darron Thomas had 290 passing yards in the game, including a 61-yard pass to tight end David Paulson, which were career longs for both players. The win moved the Ducks from 5th to 4th in the September 27 AP Poll.

=== Stanford ===
#9 Stanford at #4 Oregon

Team	1	2	3	4	Total
No. 9 Cardinal	21	10	0	0	31
• No. 4 Ducks	3	21	14	14	52

- Date: October 2
- Location: Autzen Stadium
- Game attendance: 59,818

Scoring summary
1	11:01	Oregon	Rob Beard 22-yard field goal	Oregon 3–0
1	5:06	STAN	Griff Whalen 18-yard pass from Andrew Luck (Nate Whitaker kick)	STAN 7–3
1	4:02	STAN	Andrew Luck 10-yard run (Nate Whitaker kick)	STAN 14–3
1	1:08	STAN	Stepfan Taylor 44-yard run (Nate Whitaker kick)	STAN 21–3
2	13:17	Oregon	Jeff Maehl 29-yard pass from Darron Thomas (Rob Beard kick)	STAN 21–10
2	11:18	Oregon	LaMichael James 5-yard run (Rob Beard kick)	STAN 21–17
2	7:30	STAN	Coby Fleener 36-yard pass from Andrew Luck (Nate Whitaker kick)	STAN 28–17
2	5:41	Oregon	Josh Huff 41-yard pass from Darron Thomas (Rob Beard kick)	STAN 28–24
2	0:00	STAN	Nate Whitaker 46-yard field goal	STAN 31–24
3	8:20	Oregon	Darron Thomas 6-yard run (Rob Beard kick)	Tied 31–31
3	5:34	Oregon	LaMichael James 3-yard run (Rob Beard kick)	Oregon 38–31
4	14:55	Oregon	D.J. Davis 25-yard pass from Darron Thomas (Rob Beard kick)	Oregon 45–31
4	1:10	Oregon	LaMichael James 76-yard run (Rob Beard kick)	Oregon 52–31

The Ducks and Cardinal entered the game ranked 4th and 9th in the AP Poll, respectively. Stanford surged to an early 21–3 lead after the Cardinal recovered a fumbled kickoff return by Cliff Harris. Shortly thereafter, the Ducks would respond with a touchdown and recover a surprise on-side kickoff by specialist Rob Beard. With those scores, the Ducks gained momentum, outscoring Stanford 49–10 to close the game with a 52–31 victory. Turnovers were critical in the game as Stanford quarterback Andrew Luck was intercepted twice by defensive back Cliff Harris—opportunities upon which LaMichael James would then translate into touchdowns. James finished the day with over 250 rushing, moving him into 8th place all-time in Oregon's career rushing standings. Oregon quarterback Darron Thomas contributed 4 total offensive touchdowns and 355 yards of offense. The win was the 13th straight victory for Oregon in Autzen Stadium and helped move the Ducks into third place in the AP Poll.

=== Washington State ===
	1	2	3	4	Total
#3 Ducks	15	14	7	7	43
Cougars	14	3	6	0	23

The Ducks went into this game as highly touted favorites, however they had to convert on 4th down twice in the opening drive to score. Backup running back Kenjon Barner suffered a big hit during a kickoff return and had to be carted off. Quarterback Darron Thomas suffered an injury to his right shoulder and was replaced by Nate Costa. Casey Matthews suffered an ankle injury but was able to continue playing. The Ducks moved up to No. 2 in the rankings after Alabama lost to South Carolina.

=== UCLA ===
	1	2	3	4	Total
Bruins	0	3	3	7	13
#2 Ducks	15	17	14	14	60

The Ducks started the game on defense and stalled a UCLA drive that was going well and racked up 15 first quarter points and held UCLA to 6 points going into the 4th quarter. Darron Thomas played his best game to date completing 22 of 31 passes for 308 yards 3 TD and no interceptions. LaMichael James rushed for 123 yards and 2 touchdowns. UCLA was only able to manage 290 total yards versus 582 yards by the Ducks.

=== USC ===
#2 Oregon at #24 USC

Team	1	2	3	4	Total
• Oregon	8	21	14	10	53
USC	10	7	15	0	32

- Date: October 30
- Location: Los Angeles Memorial Coliseum, Los Angeles
- Game start: 8:00 p.m. EST
- Television network: ABC

Scoring summary
1	11:42	USC	Joe Houston 42-yard field goal	USC 3-0
1	9:17	ORE	Jeff Maehl 17-yard pass from Darron Thomas (Nate Costa to Brandon Bair pass)	ORE 8-3
1	1:30	USC	Marc Tyler 1-yard run (Joe Houston kick)	USC 10-8
2	12:27	ORE	LaMichael James 42-yard run (Rob Beard kick)	ORE 15-10
2	8:50	USC	Marc Tyler 8-yard run (Joe Houston kick)	USC 17-15
2	6:45	ORE	Jeff Maehl 45-yard pass from Darron Thomas (Rob Beard kick)	ORE 22-17
2	1:10	ORE	Lavasier Tuinei 33-yard pass from Darron Thomas (Rob Beard kick)	ORE 29-17
3	13:43	USC	Ronald Johnson 5-yard pass from Matt Barkley (Joe Houston kick)	ORE 29-24
3	11:19	USC	Matt Barkley 1-yard run (Matt Barkley to Ronald Johnson pass)	USC 32-29
3	6:46	ORE	Jeff Maehl 30-yard pass from Darron Thomas (Rob Beard kick)	ORE 36-32
3	1:14	ORE	LaMichael James 2-yard run (Rob Beard kick)	ORE 43-32
4	7:18	ORE	Rob Beard 34-yard field goal	ORE 46-32
4	2:45	ORE	LaMichael James 8-yard run (Rob Beard kick)	ORE 53-32

Jeff Maehl stepped up and caught 8 passes for 145 yards and 3 TD's. LaMichael James rushed for 239 yards including a 42-yard scamper in the 2nd quarter. Thomas threw for 288 yards and four touchdowns. The performance moved the Ducks to a top BCS ranking for the first time in school history.

=== Washington ===
	1	2	3	4	Total
Huskies	0	6	10	0	16
#1 Ducks	0	18	21	14	53

The Huskies entered the game without star quarterback Jake Locker on the road. Kenjon Barner also returned to the lineup for the Ducks after recovering from a concussion suffered against Washington State. The Ducks started slowly, being held scoreless in the first quarter, but wound up routing Washington 53–16.

=== California ===
#1 Oregon at California

Team	1	2	3	4	Total
• Oregon	0	8	7	0	15
California	7	0	6	0	13

- Date: November 13
- Location: California Memorial Stadium, Berkeley, California
- Game start: 7:30 p.m. EST

Scoring summary
1	10:29	CAL	Shane Vereen 1-yard run (Giorgio Tavecchio kick)	CAL 7-0
2	6:34	ORE	Cliff Harris 64-yard punt return (Dion Jordan run)	ORE 8-7
3	14:29	ORE	Jeff Maehl 29-yard pass from Darron Thomas (Rob Beard kick)	ORE 15-7
3	9:11	CAL	Derrick Hill recovered fumble in end zone (pass failed)	ORE 15-13

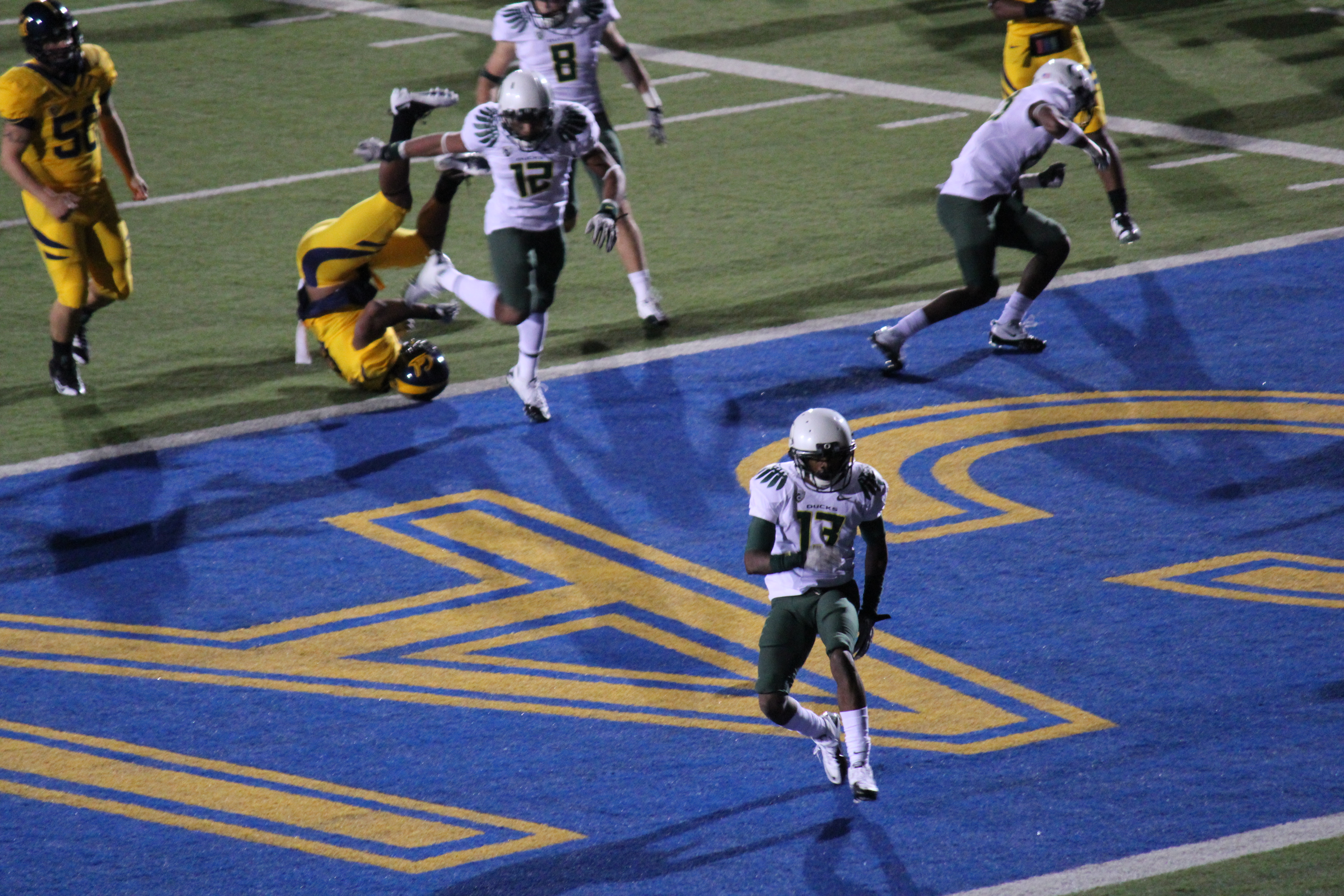
Cliff Harris scores on a 64-yard punt return, which earned him Pac-10 Special Teams Player of the Week honors

The Ducks had not won in Berkeley since 2001 and Cal had been extremely dominant at home. The Bears began their first possession with good field position at the Oregon 48-yard line and behind Shane Vereen, were able to put together a drive that he finished off with a 2-yard touchdown run. The Oregon offense was held scoreless for the second week in a row, and the Ducks did not score until more than halfway through the second quarter on a 64-yard punt return for a touchdown by Cliff Harris, with a successful 2-point conversion. The Ducks failed to add to their lead when a 37-yard field goal attempt missed.

The third quarter opened with a fumble by Vereen that Oregon recovered. Darron Thomas then connected with Jeff Maehl for a 29-yard touchdown, the Ducks' sole offensive touchdown of the game. A second Oregon field goal attempt, this one from 48 yards, missed. The final score of the game came when Thomas was sacked by Cal nose guard Derrick Hill on the Oregon 12-yard line and fumbled, with Hill recovering the fumble for a touchdown. The Bears were unable to tie the score when a 2-point conversion failed. Cal had a chance to take the lead to open the fourth quarter, but kicker Giorgio Tavecchio was penalized for an illegal motion after making a 24-yard attempt, then missed on the subsequent 29-yard attempt. After the game, Tevecchio suggested that the noise caused by visiting Oregon fans contributed to the disruption of the kicking team's rhythm. After getting the ball back with nine and a half minutes left in the game, Oregon never relinquished the ball, sustaining a time-consuming drive that ended with Thomas taking three straight knees at Cal's 11-yard line to preserve the win and stave off an upset.

The Oregon offense was held to a season-low 317 yards, with LaMichael James, the leading rusher in the country, held to 91 yards, while Darron Thomas threw for 155 and a score. In his second career start, Cal quarterback Brock Mansion threw for only 69 yards as the Bears were unable to mount an effective offense with the exception of Shane Vereen, who rushed for 112 yards and a touchdown. After the game Cal head coach Jeff Tedford denied that his players had faked injuries in order to slow down the Oregon offense, a tactic Oregon's opponents were accused of all season. On November 27, defensive line coach Tosh Lupoi was suspended for Cal's final season game for instructing a player to fake an injury during the matchup against Oregon. Lupoi was determined to have been the only person involved in such behavior.

=== Arizona ===
	1	2	3	4	Total
#21 Wildcats	14	5	3	7	29
#1 Ducks	7	7	20	14	48

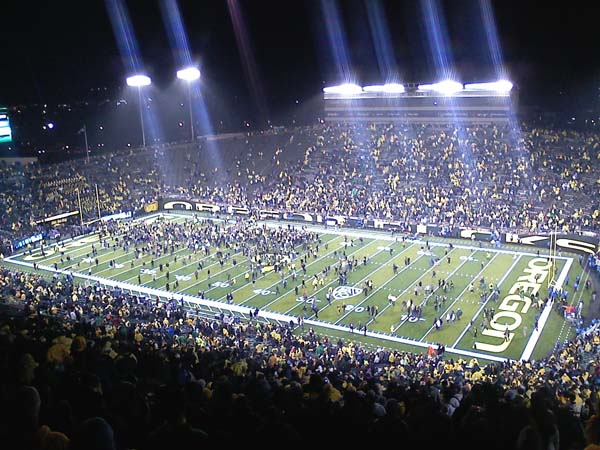
Fans storming the field following the 48–29 victory.

Oregon once again started slow in the first half and took off in the second half. The first half featured two Darron Thomas touchdowns as the Wildcats played well. Both sides were heavily penalized as Adam Hall of Arizona was flagged for two personal fouls. The second half's opening Duck drive began with an option pitch to Josh Huff that went for the longest single play of all year. Arizona only managed 10 second-half points, but they did score a touchdown in the fourth quarter as Oregon racked up 35 second-half points. LaMichael James rushed for 126 yards and 2 touchdowns, surpassing LeGarrette Blount's single-season scoring record. With the win over Arizona the Ducks have their best start in history and matched 2001's team school record 11 wins.

=== Oregon State ===
#1 Oregon at Oregon State

Team	1	2	3	4	Total
• Oregon	6	10	7	14	37
Oregon State	7	0	3	10	20

- Date: December 4
- Location: Reser Stadium, Corvallis, Oregon
- Game start: 3:30 p.m. EST
- Television network: ABC

Scoring summary
1	3:23	OSU	Jacquizz Rodgers 6-yard pass from Ryan Katz (Justin Kahut kick)	OSU 7-0
1	0:40	ORE	Kenjon Barner 3-yard pass from Darron Thomas (kick blocked)	OSU 7-6
2	12:09	ORE	Rob Beard 36-yard field goal	ORE 9-7
2	7:03	ORE	LaMichael James 8-yard run (Rob Beard kick)	ORE 16-7
3	8:39	ORE	D.J. Davis 19-yard pass from Darron Thomas (Rob Beard kick)	ORE 23-7
3	4:51	OSU	Justin Kahut 26-yard field goal	ORE 23-10
4	14:50	OSU	Justin Kahut 22-yard field goal	ORE 23-13
4	12:16	ORE	Kenjon Barner 23-yard run (Rob Beard kick)	ORE 30-13
4	4:27	ORE	LaMichael James 10-yard run (Rob Beard kick)	ORE 37-13
4	1:18	OSU	Markus Wheaton 12-yard pass from Ryan Katz (Justin Kahut kick)	ORE 37-20

The 114th meeting between the two teams in the rivalry came with high stakes for both sides. With a Rose Bowl berth already secured, the Oregon Ducks were playing for a spot in the BCS National Championship Game and the Oregon State Beavers were playing to earn a bowl berth by not finishing below a .500 win–loss record. The TCU Horned Frogs also had a vested interest in the game as they needed the Ducks to lose the game in order to be considered for the National Championship Game. The Beavers wore their throwback uniforms that paid tribute to their 1967 "Giant Killers" team.

The game proved to be intense from the very first play when Oregon linebacker Casey Matthews hit the Beavers' quarterback Ryan Katz hard, causing him to sit out for the drive. Oregon State scored first with a touchdown with 3:23 left in the first quarter, but would not score another touchdown until roughly the last minute in the game when victory was already out of reach. By halftime, the Ducks were up 16–7.

In the third quarter, a touchdown pass from Ducks quarterback Darron Thomas to wide receiver DJ Davis was set up by a fake punt where upback Michael Clay took the snap and ran up the center for a 64-yard gain. The Beavers were able to whittle the Ducks' lead down with two field goals but the Ducks scored two consecutive touchdowns in the fourth quarter. The Beavers scored a touchdown with 1:18 left in the game and attempted an onside kick, but the Ducks recovered the football and took two knees to secure their spot in the National Championship Game.

=== Auburn (BCS National Championship Game) ===
	1	2	3	4	Total
#2 Ducks	0	11	0	8	19
#1 Tigers	0	16	3	3	22

This was the first meeting between the two schools. Coming into the game, Auburn had a 5–3 record against Pac-10 teams while Oregon was 4–4 against the SEC. The game was expected be a high-scoring shootout between two high-powered offenses, and while the teams combined for nearly 1,000 yards of total offense, both teams amassed their second-lowest point totals for the 2010 season.

After a scoreless first quarter, Oregon went ahead 3–0 early in the second quarter on a 26-yard field goal by Rob Beard. On their next offensive possession, Auburn went ahead 7–3. Heisman Trophy winner Cam Newton completed a 35-yard touchdown pass to former quarterback Kodi Burns and a successful PAT kick by Wes Byrum with 12:00 remaining in the first half. Oregon quickly retook the lead, scoring on 8-yard touchdown pass from Darron Thomas to LaMichael James and a two-point conversion run by Beard, the kicker, making the score 11–7 in favor of the Ducks with 10:58 remaining in the first half.

The Tigers cut the deficit to two points when Mike Blanc tackled James in the end zone for a safety with 3:26 remaining in the half, making the score 11–9. They took the lead on a 30-yard touchdown pass from Newton to Emory Blake with 1:47 left in the first half. Byrum's successful PAT made the score 16–11.

The only score in the third quarter came on a 28-yard field goal by Byrum. Auburn held onto its eight-point lead until Oregon's LaMichael James caught a two-yard touchdown pass from Darron Thomas with 2:33 remaining in the fourth quarter and another successful two-point conversion tied the score at 19–19 and gave Auburn one last chance to win the game. With 2:17 to play, the game-deciding play occurred on a Tigers first down from their own 40, where freshman running back Michael Dyer received a handoff and appeared to be tackled by Eddie Pleasant at the 46-yard-line. However, none of the referees blew their whistle, ruling that since Dyer had rolled over the top of Pleasant and his knee never touched the ground, he was not down. While the Oregon defenders and most of the Auburn players began lining up for the next play, Dyer took off down the sideline after a moment's hesitation and ran all the way to the Oregon 23, turning what looked like a 6-yard play into a 37-yard gain that set Auburn up well into field goal range. All senior kicker Wes Byrum had to do was kick a 19-yard field goal as time expired to give Auburn its first BCS National Championship and its second national championship officially recognized by Auburn.

Dyer's run became a highly controversial play, with some arguing that since part of Dyer's ankle and lower leg touched the ground, he should have been down by rule.

RB Michael Dyer and DT Nick Fairley were voted offensive and defensive most-valuable-player respectively.

== Awards and honors ==
Eddie Robinson Coach of the Year and Associated Press College Football Coach of the Year

- Chip Kelly

Doak Walker Award

- LaMichael James, RB

== Coaching staff ==
- Chip Kelly – Head Coach
- Steve Greatwood – Offensive line
- Nick Aliotti – Defensive coordinator
- Mark Helfrich – Offensive coordinator
- Gary Campbell – Running backs
- Jerry Azzinaro – Defensive line
- John Neal – Secondary
- Tom Osborne – Tight ends & special teams
- Don Pellum – Linebackers & recruiting coordinator
- Scott Frost – Wide receivers
- Jim Radcliffe – Head strength and conditioning coach
- Alex Miller – Graduate assistant coach
- Peter Sirmon – Graduate assistant coach
- Jeff Hawkins – Senior associate athletics director, football operations
- Kyle Wiest – Asst. director of football operations
- Jim Fisher – Asst. director of football operations/recruiting
