= Darron Thomas =

American gridiron football player (born 1990)

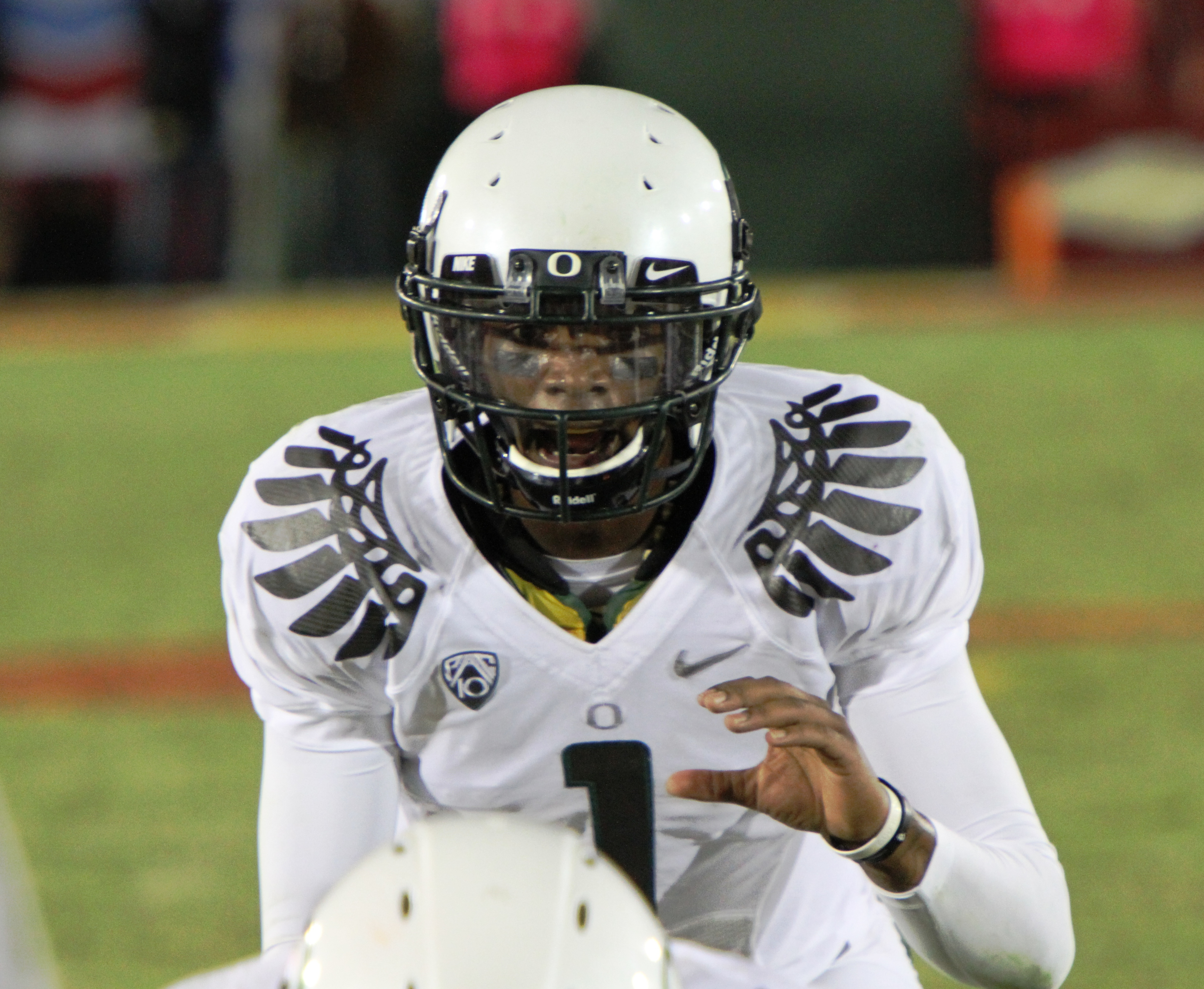
- Thomas with the Oregon Ducks in 2010

No. 1
- Position: Quarterback

Personal information
- Born: May 23, 1990 (age 36); Houston, Texas, U.S.
- Listed height: 6 ft 3 in (1.91 m)
- Listed weight: 215 lb (98 kg)

Career information
- High school: Aldine (Houston)
- College: Oregon
- NFL draft: 2012: undrafted

Career history
- Calgary Stampeders (2012)*; Lincoln Haymakers (2013)*; Portland Thunder/Steel (2014–2016); Arizona Rattlers (2017); Cedar Rapids Titans (2018)*; Massachusetts Pirates (2018); Washington Valor (2019)*
- * Offseason or practice squad member only

Awards and highlights
- United Bowl champion (2017); Second-Team All-Pac-10 (2010)

Career AFL statistics
- Comp. / Att.: 138 / 264
- Passing yards: 1,451
- TD–INT: 27–15
- QB rating: 70.44
- Rushing touchdowns: 11
- Stats at ArenaFan.com
- Stats at CFL.ca (archive)

Darron Varnell Thomas (born May 23, 1990) is an American former football quarterback. He was the starting quarterback for the University of Oregon football team that reached the 2011 BCS National Championship Game and won the 2012 Rose Bowl. He played professionally for the Portland Thunder/Steel of the Arena Football League (AFL) from 2014 to 2016.

== Early life ==
Thomas was born in Houston, Texas, on May 23, 1990, to Latina Thomas and Darren Waters. Thomas attended Aldine High School in Aldine, Texas. As a freshman at Aldine, Thomas played as a running back. During summer practice before Thomas' sophomore year, Aldine head coach, Bob Jones, had the idea of switching Thomas to quarterback to run his spread offense. Thomas was opposed to the switch, but made it anyway. During his senior season, Thomas verbally committed to Louisiana State University. When the LSU recruiting class for quarterbacks became 3 members, Thomas de-committed.

Thomas committed to the University of Oregon on December 14, 2007, choosing Oregon over scholarships from Florida, LSU, Miami (FL), Minnesota, Missouri, Nebraska, and Oklahoma State.

College recruiting
Name	Hometown	School	Height	Weight	40^{‡}	Commit date
Darron Thomas; QB	Aldine, Texas	Aldine High School	6 ft 4 in (1.93 m)	195 lb (88 kg)	4.52	Dec 14, 2007
Darron Thomas; QB	Recruit ratings: Scout: Rivals: (80)					
Overall recruit ranking: Scout: 15 (QB) Rivals: 6 (QB), 43 (TX) ESPN: 17 (ATH)
Note: In many cases, Scout, Rivals, 247Sports, On3, and ESPN may conflict in their listings of height and weight.; In these cases, the average was taken. ESPN grades are on a 100-point scale.; Sources: "Oregon Football Commitments". Rivals.; "2008 Oregon Football Commits". Scout.; "ESPN". ESPN.; "Scout.com Team Recruiting Rankings". Scout.; "2008 Team Ranking". Rivals.com.

== College career ==
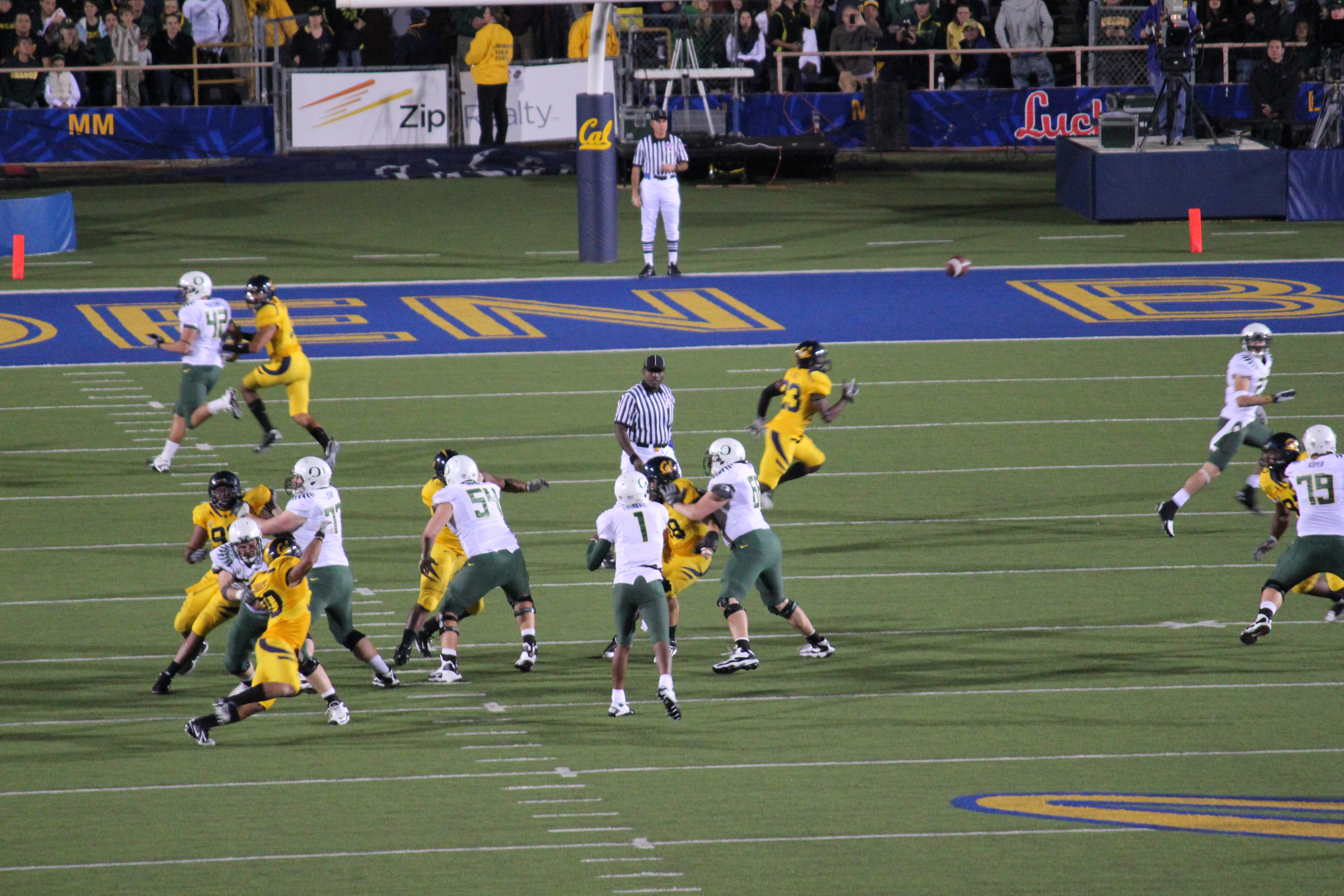
Thomas (#1) in 2010

Thomas completed his career at Oregon with a 24–3 record as a starter, leading the Ducks to two consecutive Pac-12 Championships, including appearances in two BCS Bowl games.

Just months removed from Aldine High in Houston, Thomas came off the bench as a true freshman to lead a stirring second-half rally against Boise State in his first collegiate game. Thomas tossed three touchdown passes in the fourth quarter to rally Oregon from a 24-point deficit. The Ducks lost to Boise State 37–32 but his unexpected debut and impressive performance led many fans to believe he would be the true successor to Dennis Dixon, however, he would continue to backup Jeremiah Masoli for the remainder of the 2008 season.

=== 2011 BCS National Championship ===
After redshirting the 2009 season, Thomas became the starting quarterback for the Ducks in 2010 after previous starter Jeremiah Masoli was suspended for the 2010 season and eventually dismissed from the team.

In his first season as a starter, Thomas threw for 2,881 yards and 30 touchdowns, leading Oregon to a 12–0 regular season record, and an appearance in the 2011 BCS National Championship Game against Auburn. In that game, Thomas threw for 363 yards and two touchdowns, but also threw two interceptions. Auburn would ultimately go on to win 22–19, with a last-second field goal. After the season, Thomas was named as a 2nd Team All-Pac-10 Conference selection at quarterback and the co-recipient of the Skeie's Award as the team's most outstanding player.

=== 2012 Rose Bowl ===
During the 2011 season, Thomas threw for 2,761 yards, and a single season school record of 33 touchdowns, leading the Ducks to the 2012 Rose Bowl, in which Thomas threw for 268 yards and 3 touchdowns to propel Oregon to a 45–38 victory over Wisconsin. The Ducks finished the season 12–2 (8–1 Pac-12) with a #4 final season ranking.

== Professional career ==
=== Pre-draft ===
At the end of his junior season, Thomas surprisingly chose to forgo his senior year to enter the 2012 NFL draft but was neither drafted nor signed as an undrafted free agent by any NFL team. He was rated the 17th best quarterback in the 2012 Draft by NFLDraftScout.com.

Pre-draft measurables
Height	Weight	Arm length	Hand span	40-yard dash	10-yard split	20-yard split	20-yard shuttle	Three-cone drill	Vertical jump	Broad jump	Bench press
6 ft 2 5/8 in (1.90 m)	220 lb (100 kg)	32 7/8 in (0.84 m)	9 1/2 in (0.24 m)	4.80 s	1.66 s	2.79 s	4.28 s	7.17 s	36 in (0.91 m)	10 ft 1 in (3.07 m)	14 reps
All values from NFL Combine

=== Calgary Stampeders ===
On October 9, 2012, Thomas signed a practice roster agreement with the Calgary Stampeders of the Canadian Football League.

=== Lincoln Haymakers ===
He would later sign with the Lincoln Haymakers of the Champions Professional Indoor Football League but never played a game for the Haymakers.

=== Portland Thunder/Steel ===
Thomas was assigned to the Portland Thunder of the Arena Football League on October 10, 2013. Thomas fits in with the ownership's promise of getting players with Oregon ties. Thomas started the first three games of the season for the Thunder before being benched in favor of Danny Southwick. Thomas became the primary back up for the Thunder since losing his starting position. Entering his second season with the Thunder in 2015, Thomas was once again the backup quarterback to Kyle Rowley.

Thomas participated in the NFL's first Veteran Combine in March 2015. On January 27, 2016, he was named head coach Chris Miller's franchise player in Major League Football. The team was to be called the Oregon Crash but the season never started.

Thomas was assigned to the Portland Steel on April 25, 2016. He made his only start of the season on May 10, 2016, against the Los Angeles Kiss, completing 25 of 49 passes for 259 yards, 3 touchdowns and 5 interceptions in a 66–27 loss.

=== Arizona Rattlers ===
On October 28, 2016, Thomas signed with the Arizona Rattlers, who joined the Indoor Football League a week prior. Thomas played in 5 games for the Rattlers in 2017, completing 54 of 93 passes for 576 yards, 13 touchdowns and 4 interceptions. He also scored four rushing touchdowns. On July 8, the Rattlers defeated the Sioux Falls Storm in the United Bowl by a score of 50–41.

=== Cedar Rapids Titans ===
On February 5, 2018, AZ Central Sports columnist Richard Obert reported that Thomas was traded to the Cedar Rapids Titans in exchange for local Arizona product Jordan Gehrke. Thomas was released by the Titans on February 21, 2018.

=== Massachusetts Pirates ===
On May 17, 2018, Thomas signed with the Massachusetts Pirates of the National Arena League.

=== Washington Valor ===
Thomas was assigned to the Washington Valor in 2019, but he was placed on reassignment on April 19, 2019.

== Career statistics ==
=== AFL ===
Year	Team	Passing							Rushing		
Year	Team	Cmp	Att	Pct	Yds	TD	Int	Rtg	Att	Yds	TD
2014	Portland	75	157	47.8	818	13	9	60.4	37	82	10
2015	Portland	38	58	65.5	374	11	1	115.9	9	12	1
2016	Portland	25	49	51.0	259	3	5	42.4	1	2	0
Career		138	264	52.3	1,451	27	15	70.4	47	96	11

=== College ===
			Passing							Rushing			
Year	Team	GP	Cmp	Att	Pct	Yds	TD	Int	Rtg	Att	Yds	Avg	TD
2008	Oregon	5	16	33	48.5	268	3	1	140.6	13	27	2.1	1
2010	Oregon	13	222	361	61.5	2,881	30	9	151.0	93	486	5.2	5
2011	Oregon	13	211	339	62.2	2,761	33	7	158.7	56	206	3.7	3
Career		31	449	733	61.3	5,910	66	17	154.1	162	719	4.4	9
