= AP College Football Coach of the Year =

Annual college football award

- Awarded for: The most outstanding collegiate football coach in the country
- Country: United States
- Presented by: Associated Press

History
- First award: 1998
- Most recent: Curt Cignetti, Indiana

The AP College Football Coach of the Year award is given annually since 1998 to NCAA college football's national coach of the year. The award is voted on by the Associated Press (AP) voters that participate in the weekly college football AP Poll. The current award holder for 2025 is Curt Cignetti of the Indiana Hoosiers.

== Winners ==
Year	Winner	School
1998	Bill Snyder	Kansas State
1999	Frank Beamer	Virginia Tech
2000	Bob Stoops	Oklahoma
2001	Ralph Friedgen	Maryland
2002	Kirk Ferentz	Iowa
2003	Nick Saban	LSU
2004	Tommy Tuberville	Auburn
2005	Joe Paterno	Penn State
2006	Jim Grobe	Wake Forest
2007	Mark Mangino	Kansas
2008	Nick Saban (2)	Alabama
2009	Gary Patterson	TCU
2010	Chip Kelly	Oregon
2011	Les Miles	LSU
2012	Brian Kelly	Notre Dame
2013	Gus Malzahn	Auburn
2014	Gary Patterson (2)	TCU
2015	Dabo Swinney	Clemson
2016	Mike MacIntyre	Colorado
2017	Scott Frost	UCF
2018	Brian Kelly (2)	Notre Dame
2019	Ed Orgeron	LSU
2020	Jamey Chadwell	Coastal Carolina
2021	Jim Harbaugh	Michigan
2022	Sonny Dykes	TCU
2023	Kalen DeBoer	Washington
2024	Curt Cignetti	Indiana
2025	Curt Cignetti (2)	Indiana

== Winners by school ==
School	Trophies won
LSU	3
TCU	3
Auburn	2
Indiana	2
Notre Dame	2
Alabama	1
Clemson	1
Coastal Carolina	1
Colorado	1
Iowa	1
Kansas	1
Kansas State	1
Maryland	1
Michigan	1
Oklahoma	1
Oregon	1
Penn State	1
UCF	1
Virginia Tech	1
Wake Forest	1
Washington	1
