= Nick Fairley =

American football player (born 1988)

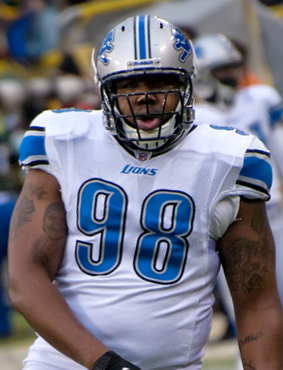
- Fairley with the Detroit Lions in 2012

No. 98, 90
- Position: Defensive tackle

Personal information
- Born: January 23, 1988 (age 38); Mobile, Alabama, U.S.
- Listed height: 6 ft 4 in (1.93 m)
- Listed weight: 308 lb (140 kg)

Career information
- High school: Williamson (Mobile, Alabama)
- College: Copiah-Lincoln CC (2007–2008); Auburn (2009–2010)
- NFL draft: 2011: 1st round, 13th overall pick

Career history
- Detroit Lions (2011–2014); St. Louis Rams (2015); New Orleans Saints (2016–2017)

Awards and highlights
- BCS national champion (2010); Consensus All-American (2010); First-team All-SEC (2010); SEC Defensive Player of the Year (2010); Lombardi Award (2010)

Career NFL statistics
- Total tackles: 170
- Sacks: 20.5
- Forced fumbles: 4
- Fumble recoveries: 4
- Defensive touchdowns: 1
- Stats at Pro Football Reference

Nicholas Lachester Fairley (born January 23, 1988) is an American former professional football player who was a defensive tackle in the National Football League (NFL). He played college football for Auburn University, where in 2010 he was recognized as an All-American, the SEC Defensive Player of the Year and helped lead Auburn to a national championship victory in which he was named the game's defensive MVP. Fairley was selected by the Detroit Lions in the first round of the 2011 NFL draft. He also played for the St. Louis Rams and the New Orleans Saints.

== Early life ==
Fairley was born in Mobile, Alabama. He attended Williamson High School in Mobile, where he was a two-way lineman and also lettered in basketball. Regarded as a three-star prospect, he was projected as an offensive guard. He committed to Auburn, but was not able to qualify academically.

== College career ==
=== Copiah-Lincoln Community College ===
Fairley attended Copiah-Lincoln Community College from 2007 to 2008. After being redshirted in 2007, he played in seven games in 2008. He recorded 63 tackles and seven sacks in the 2008 season.

=== Auburn University ===
Fairley transferred to Auburn University, where he played for the Auburn Tigers football team in 2009 and 2010. He finished the 2009 season with two starts in 13 games and recorded 28 tackles. Surprisingly quick for his size, his tendency to be flamboyant following a successful play placed him as a person of concern for officials. In 2010, he became the 2nd player from Auburn to win the Lombardi Award. He was coached by Lombardi winner and former Auburn player Tracy Rocker, and became the first player to win the Lombardi and be coached by a winner of the award.

During the 2011 BCS National Championship Game against the Oregon Ducks, Fairley had five tackles, a sack, and a forced fumble. Three of his tackles were made behind the line of scrimmage. Fairley was selected as the defensive player of the game.

== Professional career ==
=== Pre-draft ===
Only four days after the 2011 BCS National Championship Game, Fairley decided to forgo his final year of eligibility, entering the 2011 NFL draft. He was initially projected to be the potential first overall pick in the draft. His measurements at the combine showed him to be 6 feet 3 7/8 inches tall and 291 pounds, somewhat less than his listing of 6–5 and 300 pounds at Auburn. After the NFL Combine, he was projected in the 8–12 range.

Pre-draft measurables
Height	Weight	Arm length	Hand span	Wingspan	40-yard dash	10-yard split	20-yard split	20-yard shuttle	Three-cone drill	Vertical jump	Broad jump
6 ft 3 7/8 in (1.93 m)	291 lb (132 kg)	34 3/4 in (0.88 m)	9 3/4 in (0.25 m)	6 ft 11 1/4 in (2.11 m)	4.89 s	1.75 s	2.88 s	4.56 s	7.14 s	31 in (0.79 m)	9 ft 5 in (2.87 m)
All values from NFL Combine

=== Detroit Lions ===
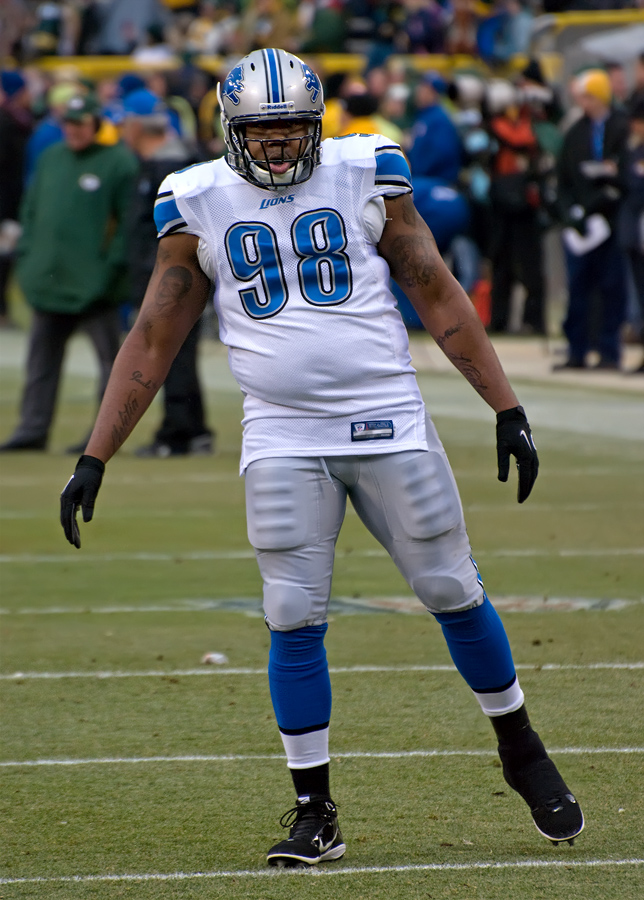
Fairley with the Detroit Lions in 2012

Fairley was selected by the Detroit Lions in the first round as the 13th pick overall. He signed a 4-year contract with the Lions on July 28, 2011. The contract was for four years and worth $10 million with a $5.7 million signing bonus.

In Detroit, he joined All-Pro Ndamukong Suh on the interior of the Detroit defensive line. Though at times his play was stout, he was troubled by inconsistency.

In his second season in the NFL Fairley recorded 5.5 sacks, 2 forced fumbles, and 26 tackles. However, on December 12, 2012, Fairley was put on the injured reserve list, ending his season.

Fairley's fourth season had been productive for the most part. However, on October 26, 2014, Fairley sustained a medial collateral ligament sprain against the Atlanta Falcons at Wembley Stadium in London.

=== St. Louis Rams ===
On March 13, 2015, Fairley signed a one-year, $5 million contract with the St. Louis Rams. Fairley played in 15 games for the Rams in 2015 along their defensive line rotation and recorded 29 tackles (18 solo), a split sack, a pass defended, and one fumble recovery. On December 31, Fairley was placed on injured reserve.

=== New Orleans Saints ===
On March 28, 2016, Fairley signed a one-year, $5 million contract with the New Orleans Saints. After recording career-highs in tackles and sacks in 2016, Fairley signed a four-year, $30 million contract extension with the Saints during the 2017 off-season.

On June 26, 2017, the Saints placed Fairley on the reserve/non-football-illness list regarding a lingering heart condition, ending his 2017 season.

On February 5, 2018, Fairley was released by the Saints.

== NFL career statistics ==
Year	Team	GP	Tackles				Fumbles			Interceptions					
Year	Team	GP	Cmb	Solo	Ast	Sck	FF	FR	Yds	Int	Yds	Avg	Lng	TD	PD
2011	DET	10	15	9	6	1.0	0	0	0	0	0	0.0	0	0	0
2012	DET	13	34	27	7	5.5	2	1	0	0	0	0.0	0	0	1
2013	DET	15	35	22	13	6.0	1	2	4	0	0	0.0	0	0	1
2014	DET	8	14	8	6	1.0	1	0	0	0	0	0.0	0	0	0
2015	STL	15	29	18	11	0.5	0	1	−5	0	0	0.0	0	0	1
2016	NO	16	43	29	14	6.5	0	0	0	0	0	0.0	0	0	0
Career		77	170	113	57	20.5	4	4	0	0	0	0.0	0	0	3

== Personal life ==
Since entering the NFL, Fairley has had a number of run-ins with the law. On April 3, 2012, Fairley was arrested in Mobile, Alabama for marijuana possession. The charges were dismissed in December 2012.

On May 27, 2012, Fairley was arrested by Alabama State Troopers for driving under the influence and attempting to elude police. He was also ticketed for reckless driving, having an open container of alcohol in the vehicle and no proof of insurance.

On June 3, 2017, it was revealed that Fairley was diagnosed with a heart condition that could threaten his career.

On December 1, 2018, Fairley was arrested on criminal menacing charges when he allegedly threatened a person with a gun.
