= 2011 BCS National Championship Game =

College football bowl game

2011 Tostitos BCS National Championship Game
- 13th BCS National Championship Game
Oregon Ducks	Auburn Tigers
(12–0)	(13–0)
Pac-10	SEC
19	22
Head coach: Chip Kelly	Head coach: Gene Chizik
AP / Coaches / BCS; 2 / 1 / 2	AP / Coaches / BCS; 1 / 2 / 1
	1	2	3	4	Total
Oregon	0	11	0	8	19
Auburn	0	16	3	3	22
- Date: January 10, 2011
- Season: 2010
- Stadium: University of Phoenix Stadium
- Location: Glendale, Arizona
- MVP: Offense: Michael Dyer (RB, Auburn); Defense: Nick Fairley (DT, Auburn)
- Favorite: Auburn by 2
- National anthem: Air Force Cadet Chorale
- Referee: Bill LeMonnier (Big Ten)
- Halftime show: Auburn University Marching Band; Oregon Marching Band
- Attendance: 78,603
- Payout: US$21.2 million

United States TV coverage
- Network: ESPN
- Announcers: Brent Musburger (play-by-play); Kirk Herbstreit (analyst); Erin Andrews and Tom Rinaldi (sideline)
- Nielsen ratings: 17.8 (27.3 million viewers)

The 2011 BCS National Championship Game (branded as the 2011 Tostitos BCS National Championship Game for sponsorship reasons) was a college football bowl game to determine the national champion of the 2010 NCAA Division I Football Bowl Subdivision (FBS) season. The finale of the 2010–2011 Bowl Championship Series was played at the University of Phoenix Stadium, the host facility of the Fiesta Bowl in Glendale, Arizona, on January 10, 2011 (8:30 p.m. ET).

The Auburn Tigers from the Southeastern Conference faced the Oregon Ducks of the Pacific-10 Conference for the national championship. The Ducks were seeking to win their first national championship in school history. A 19-yard field goal by Wes Byrum, as time expired, won the game for the Tigers, with the final score 22–19. It was the Tigers' second title recognized by the University (three being unclaimed) and first since 1957.

The game was the first BCS National Championship Game not televised on network television, instead being aired on ESPN and simulcast on ESPN3, and recorded a 16.1 rating, the highest overnight rating on record for a cable television program, topping the previous high of 14.4, set by New England Patriots vs. New Orleans Saints on ESPN in 2009. This marked the second time that the national championship under the BCS system was played in Arizona. It was also the first time that the BCS National Championship was streamed to a video game console, specifically the Xbox 360.

== Teams ==
Finishing No. 1 and No. 2 in the final BCS rankings, respectively, the Auburn Tigers from the Southeastern Conference faced the Oregon Ducks of the Pacific-10 Conference for the national championship. Both teams finished the regular season undefeated. The Coaches Poll, which partially factored into the BCS rankings, had Oregon No. 1 and Auburn No. 2, though Auburn's higher rankings in the Harris Interactive Poll and computer polls gave them the edge for No. 1 in the BCS. The Associated Press Poll (AP), which did not factor into the BCS rankings, had Auburn No. 1 and Oregon No. 2.

=== Oregon Ducks ===
The Ducks led the Pacific-10 Conference in scoring offense (592 points, 49.3 average), rushing offense (42 touchdowns, 303.8 yards per game), rushing defense (11 touchdowns, 117.6 yards per game), and total offense (71 touchdowns, 537.5 yards per game). The team was led by tailback LaMichael James, who tops the conference with 1,682 yards on 281 carries, 21 touchdowns and averaging 152.9 yards per game. His longest carry was for 76 yards. Jeff Maehl was Oregon's top receiver at 78.58 ypg for 12 touchdowns. Casey Matthews had averaged 6.08 tackles per game for the Ducks, followed by Spencer Paysinger (5.7), Talmadge Jackson III (5.6) and John Boyett (5.6).

Oregon was wearing the Nike new Pro Combat uniforms, their 13th uniform combination worn this season.

=== Auburn Tigers ===
The Tigers completed the season on top of the Southeastern Conference in scoring offense (42.7 points per game), rushing offense (287.2 yards per game) and total offense (497.7 yards per game). Auburn also led the conference in pass efficiency (174 of 261 passes, 6 interceptions, 66.7%, 29 touchdowns), third-down conversions (77 of 145, 53.1%) and first downs (316 or 24.3 per game). Quarterback and Heisman Trophy winner Cam Newton led the conference in rushing, pass efficiency, total offense, and scoring. On the receiving end, Darvin Adams caught 48 passes for 909 yards (69.92 ypg) and 7 touchdowns. On the defensive side, Auburn was led by Lombardi Award winning, Consensus All-American defensive tackle Nick Fairly, who led the conference in sacks (11.5) and tackles for loss (24). The Tigers secondary was led by Josh Bynes, Zac Etheridge and Neiko Thorpe combined to make 199 tackles for the Tigers during the season. The Tigers were very strong in close games, having a 6–0 record in one-possession games entering the National Championship.

== Starting lineups ==
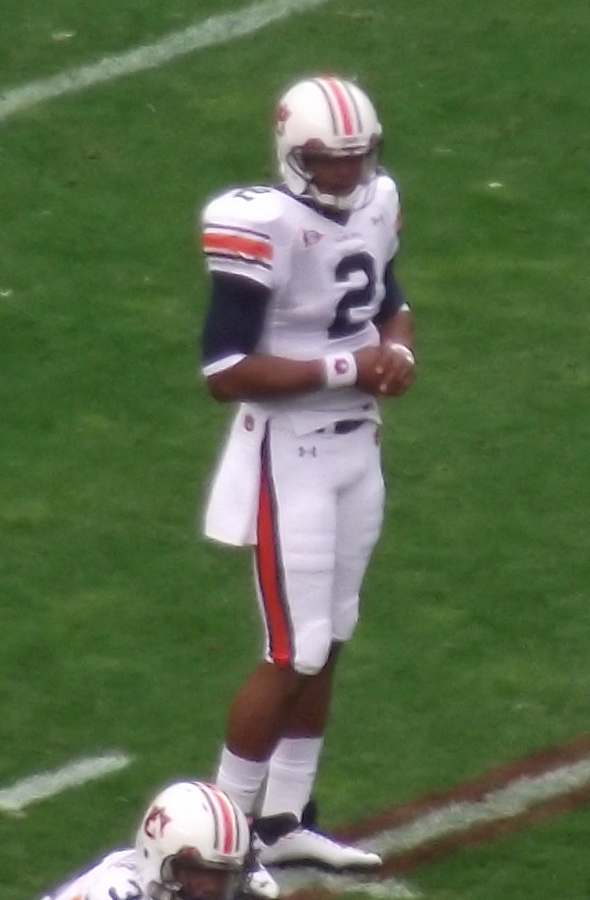
Auburn quarterback Cam Newton was the 2010 Heisman trophy winner.

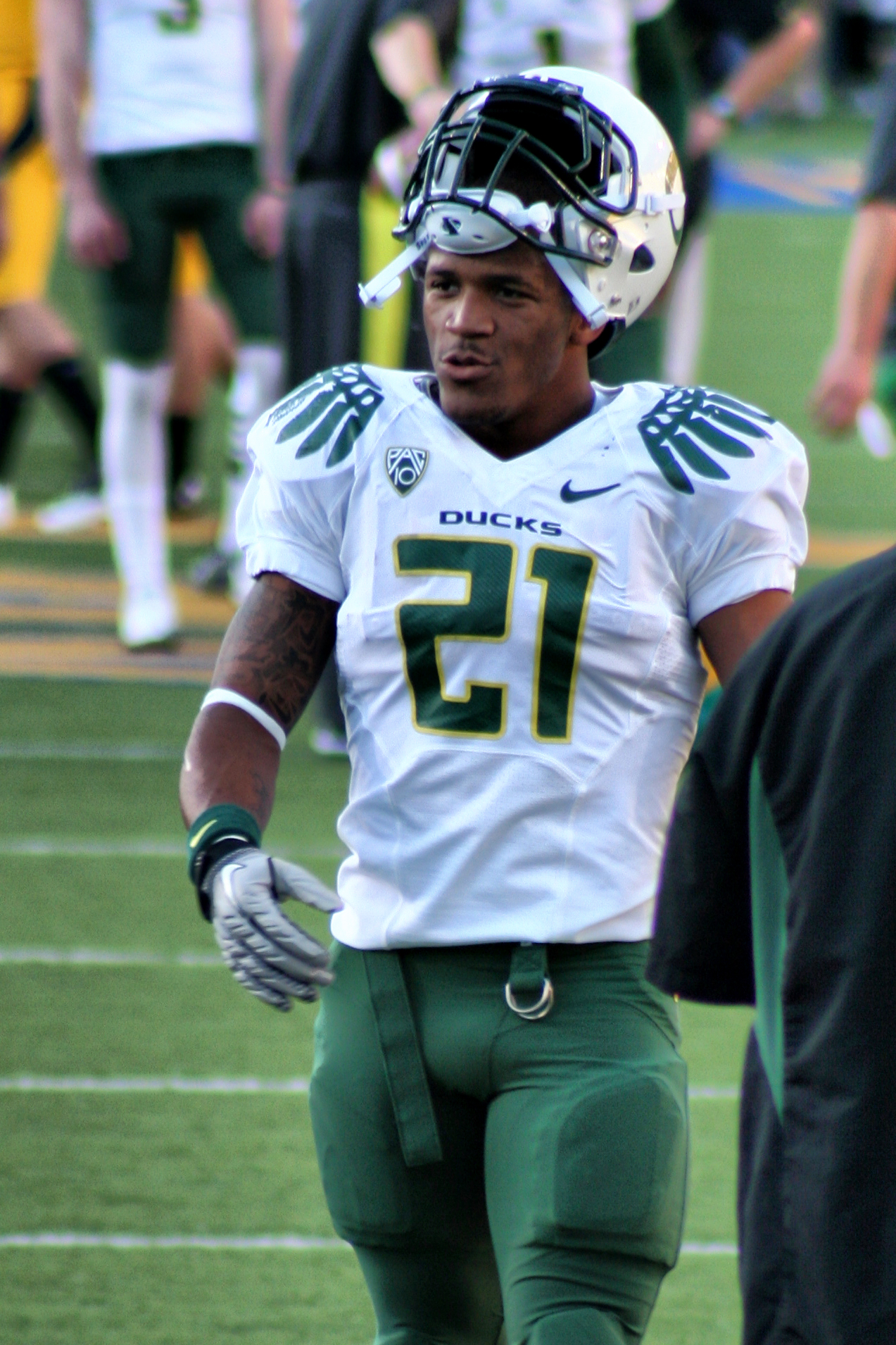
Oregon running back LaMichael James entered the game as the Doak Walker Award winner.

Selected in an NFL Draft (number corresponds to draft round)

† = 2010 All-American

Auburn	Position	Oregon
Offense
Darvin Adams	WR	Lavasier Tuinei
Terrell Zachary	WR	D.J. Davis
†Lee Ziemba 7	LT	Bo Thran
Mike Berry	LG	Carson York
Ryan Pugh	C	Jordan Holmes
Byron Isom	RG	C.E. Kaiser
Brandon Mosley 4	RT	Mark Asper 6
Philip Lutzenkirchen	TE	David Paulson 7
Kodi Burns	WR	Jeff Maehl
†Cam Newton 1	QB	Darron Thomas
Michael Dyer	RB	†LaMichael James 2
Defense
Nosa Eguae	DE	Terrell Turner
Zach Clayton 7	DT	Brandon Blair
†Nick Fairley 1	DT	Zac Clark
Antoine Carter	DE	Kenny Rowe
Josh Bynes	MLB	†Casey Matthews 4
Craig Stevens	LOLB	Spencer Paysinger
Daren Bates	ROLB	Josh Kaddu 5
Demond Washington	CB	†Cliff Harris
Neiko Thorpe	CB	Talmadge Jackson III
Zac Etheridge	FS	John Boyett 6
Mike McNeil	SS	Eddie Pleasant

== Game summary ==
Prior to the game a moment of silence was held for the victims of the shooting in Tucson, Arizona, two days before the game in which U.S. Representative Gabby Giffords was shot in the head and six others, including Federal Judge John Roll, were killed.

Despite the two teams having among the nations top offenses, neither team scored in the first quarter, with both teams punting on their opening drive. On Oregon's second drive Thomas threw an interception to Demond Washington. On the second play of the ensuing drive Newton threw an interception to Cliff Harris. On the following drive after moving the ball to the Auburn 27, Thomas threw his second interception, this time to safety Zac Etheridge. Auburn once again failed to capitalize on a Thomas interception and punted.

Early in the second quarter, Oregon scored the first points on a 26-yard field goal, to go up 3-0. Auburn then claimed the lead on an 82-yard drive, finishing with a Kodi Burns touchdown reception. Oregon responded quickly with a four-play drive, ending with a touchdown reception by LaMichael James and added a two-point conversion to make the score 11-7. The next drive, Auburn drove to the Oregon one yard line but turned the ball over on downs. Two plays later, however, Auburn tackled James in the endzone for a safety, making the score 11-9. On Auburn's final drive of the first half, Newton found Emory Blake for a 30-yard touchdown pass to make the score 16-11 at the half.

On the first drive of the 3rd quarter, Auburn kicker Wes Byrum kicked a 28-yard field goal to give Auburn a 19-11 lead. Following a pair of punts by both teams, Oregon drove to the Auburn 1 yard line, but was stopped on the goal line and lost possession.

The teams traded possession several times in the 4th quarter, until Oregon recovered a fumble on the Auburn 40-yard line with 4:54 left. Oregon then drove down the field and scored a touchdown at the 2:33 minute mark. They added a two-point conversion to even the score, 19-19.

On the game's final possession, Auburn drove 73 yards to the Oregon 1-yard line. The drive included a run by Michael Dyer, in which he appeared to be tackled after 6-7 yards, but fell on top of defender Eddie Pleasant. Since neither his knees nor the ball touched the ground, the Auburn sideline urged Dyer to continue after getting back up, and the Oregon defense finally tackled him after a 37-yard gain. The play was reviewed and the ruling on the field was upheld. Dyer then rushed for a touchdown, but a subsequent review showed that Dyer's knee went down before crossing the goal line. The touchdown was reversed and the ball placed at the Oregon 1-yard line. From there, Auburn ran the clock down to 2 seconds, and Wes Byrum kicked a game-winning 19-yard field goal as time expired, giving Auburn the national championship.

=== Scoring summary ===
Scoring summary

Quarter	Time	Drive			Team	Scoring information	Score	
Quarter	Time	Plays	Yards	TOP	Team	Scoring information	Auburn	Oregon
2	14:13	10	62	3:01	Oregon	26-yard field goal by Rob Beard	0	3
2	12:00	8	82	2:13	Auburn	Kodi Burns 35-yard touchdown reception from Cam Newton, Wes Byrum kick good	7	3
2	10:58	4	93	1:02	Oregon	LaMichael James 8-yard touchdown reception from Darron Thomas, 2-point run good	7	11
2	3:26	1	-1	0:18	Auburn	LaMichael James tackled in end zone for a safety by Mike Blanc	9	11
2	1:47	6	66	1:39	Auburn	Emory Blake 30-yard touchdown reception from Cam Newton, Wes Byrum kick good	16	11
3	11:30	9	60	3:30	Auburn	28-yard field goal by Wes Byrum	19	11
4	2:33	8	40	2:21	Oregon	LaMichael James 2-yard touchdown reception from Darron Thomas, 2-point pass good	19	19
4	0:00	7	73	2:33	Auburn	19-yard field goal by Wes Byrum	22	19
"TOP" = time of possession. For other American football terms, see Glossary of American football.							22	19

=== Statistics ===
Statistics	ORE	AUB
First downs	23	24
Total yards	449	519
Rushes–yards	32–75	50–274
Passing yards	374	265
Passing: Comp–Att–Int	28–41–2	20–35–1
Time of possession	27:03	32:57

Team	Category	Player	Statistics
Auburn	Passing	Cam Newton	20/34, 265 yards, 2 TD, 1 INT
Auburn	Rushing	Michael Dyer	22 carries, 143 yards
Auburn	Receiving	Emory Blake	4 receptions, 54 yards, 1 TD
Oregon	Passing	Darron Thomas	27/40, 363 yards, 2 TD, 2 INT
Oregon	Rushing	LaMichael James	13 carries, 49 yards
Oregon	Receiving	Jeff Maehl	9 receptions, 133 yards

== Aftermath ==
By winning the game, Auburn was crowned as the BCS National Champion. In addition, Auburn was ranked as the number one team by the Associated Press.

== Rankings ==
- For the second time in BCS history, three No. 1 teams (Oklahoma, Auburn, and Oregon) were ranked in the first three standings of the year. In 1998, the first season of the BCS, UCLA debuted at No. 1, followed by Ohio State and Tennessee.
- Three teams from non-Automatic Qualify conference schools (TCU, Boise State, Utah) were ranked in the top-five at the same time after three weeks of BCS rankings. TCU ended the season as the No. 2 team and won the 2011 Rose Bowl game. TCU was picked by a postseason poll as having won a share of the national championship, due to their 13-0 perfect record and win over #4 ranked Wisconsin in the Rose Bowl.

== Notes ==
- This was the first meeting between the two schools in football. Auburn had played one school from the state of Oregon (Oregon State at Birmingham in 1973) and Oregon had not previously played a team from the state of Alabama. Auburn had a 5–3 record against Pac-10 teams while Oregon was 4–4 against the SEC.
- As the Pac-10 and SEC never had a common bowl game tie-in during the entirety of the BCS era, the only ways for two teams from those conferences to meet in the postseason would be either for a team from each conference to qualify for the BCS National Championship Game, with this particular game being the only time that that happened during those 16 years, or for a team from either or both conferences to receive an at-large bid to a BCS bowl, something that never occurred (in 2002, the Sugar Bowl wanted USC to play Georgia, but the Orange Bowl, which had higher priority that year in terms of picks due to having a higher payout, beat them out and in 2013 the Sugar Bowl was considering picking Oregon to play Alabama, but ultimately passed them over in favor of Oklahoma). The most recent bowl game which featured a Pac-10 team vs an SEC team was the 1989 Freedom Bowl when the Washington Huskies defeated the Florida Gators 34-7. The Pac-10 and SEC both expanded in subsequent years (with the Pac-10 being renamed the Pac-12) and teams from those two conferences met again in the 2016 Peach Bowl with the Alabama Crimson Tide facing the Washington Huskies in a semifinal game of the College Football Playoff which replaced the Bowl Championship Series after the 2013 season, the Pac-12 and SEC would also eventually get a bowl game tie-in in the form of the Las Vegas Bowl in 2020, albeit it also has a rotating tie-in with the Big Ten Conference.
- Two Auburn teams were undefeated in 1993 and 2004, but did not play for the national championship.
- Seven BCS Championship game records were broken or tied, including the longest pass play when Darron Thomas passed to Jeff Maehl for 81 yards, the most team passing yards (374, Oregon), and most 2-point conversions (2). The combined passing yardage of the two teams (639 yards) were also the most in the games. Auburn's 85 total plays were a new record, exceeding the record set at the January 4, 2006 game between Texas and USC with 82 plays.
- The game was played two days after the 2011 Tucson shooting, an attempted assassination attempt on Rep. Gabby Giffords of Arizona, that took the lives of several others, including a federal judge and a 9-year-old girl. A moment of silence was held in honor of those lost before the game. Tucson is in Pima County in Arizona, and the adjacent county is Maricopa County, where Glendale is located.
- Cam Newton's performance was somewhat limited due a back injury, evident at the game's conclusion when he was lying in pain waiting on the trophy presentation.
