= Toxey, Alabama =

- Town
- Location of Toxey in Choctaw County, Alabama.
- Coordinates: 31°54′39″N 88°18′33″W
- Country: United States
- State: Alabama
- County: Choctaw

Area
  - Total: 0.68 sq mi (1.77 km^{2})
  - Land: 0.68 sq mi (1.77 km^{2})
  - Water: 0 sq mi (0.00 km^{2})
- Elevation: 105 ft (32 m)

Population (2020)
  - Total: 145
  - Density: 211.9/sq mi (81.82/km^{2})
- Time zone: UTC-6 (Central (CST))
  - Summer (DST): UTC-5 (CDT)
- ZIP code: 36921
- Area code: 251
- FIPS code: 01-76632
- GNIS feature ID: 2406745

Toxey is a town in Choctaw County, Alabama, United States. At the 2020 census, the population was 145.

== Geography ==
Toxey is located south of the center of Choctaw County.

According to the U.S. Census Bureau, the town has a total area of 0.69 square miles (1.8 km^{2}), all land.

== Demographics ==
Historical population
Census	Pop.	Note	%±
1950	251		—
1960	157		−37.5%
1970	304		93.6%
1980	265		−12.8%
1990	211		−20.4%
2000	152		−28.0%
2010	137		−9.9%
2020	145		5.8%
U.S. Decennial Census; 2013 Estimate

As of the census of 2000, there were 152 people, 61 households, and 45 families residing in the town. The population density was 221.9 inhabitants per square mile (85.7/km^{2}). There were 74 housing units at an average density of 108.0 per square mile (41.7/km^{2}). The racial makeup of the town was 86.84% White and 13.16% Black or African American.

There were 61 households, out of which 34.4% had children under the age of 18 living with them, 62.3% were married couples living together, 9.8% had a female householder with no husband present, and 24.6% were non-families. 23.0% of all households were made up of individuals, and 14.8% had someone living alone who was 65 years of age or older. The average household size was 2.49 and the average family size was 2.87.

In the town, the population was spread out, with 29.6% under the age of 18, 3.3% from 18 to 24, 25.7% from 25 to 44, 19.7% from 45 to 64, and 21.7% who were 65 years of age or older. The median age was 39 years. For every 100 females, there were 94.9 males. For every 100 females age 18 and over, there were 81.4 males.

The median income for a household in the town was $23,750, and the median income for a family was $27,143. Males had a median income of $36,250 versus $17,188 for females. The per capita income for the town was $16,244. About 7.1% of families and 13.8% of the population were below the poverty line, including 22.9% of those under the age of eighteen and 29.4% of those 65 or over.

== Notable person ==
- Mary Monroe, author
