= Arizona State Sun Devils football statistical leaders =

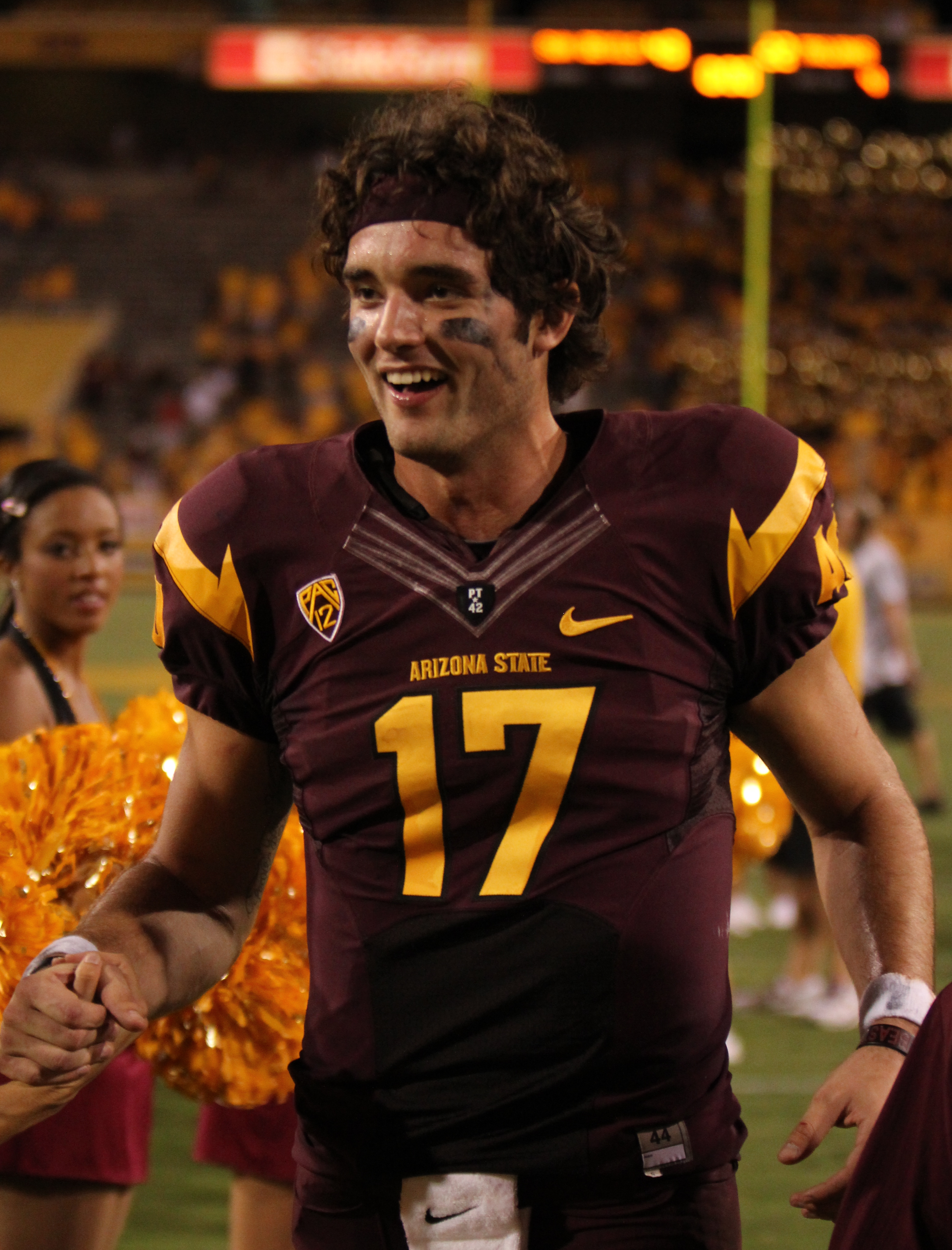
Brock Osweiler set the Sun Devils' single-season passing yards record in 2011.

The Arizona State Sun Devils football statistical leaders are individual statistical leaders of the Arizona State Sun Devils football program in various categories, including passing, rushing, receiving, total offense, defensive stats, and kicking. Within those areas, the lists identify single-game, single-season, and career leaders. The Sun Devils represent Arizona State University in the NCAA Division I FBS Big 12 Conference.

Although Arizona State began competing in intercollegiate football in 1897, the school's official record book considers the "modern era" to have begun in 1946. Records from before this year are often incomplete and inconsistent, and they are generally not included in these lists.

These lists are dominated by more recent players for several reasons:

- Since 1946, seasons have increased from 10 games to 11 and then 12 games in length.
- The NCAA didn't allow freshmen to play varsity football until 1972 (with the exception of the World War II years), allowing players to have four-year careers.
- Bowl games only began counting toward single-season and career statistics in 2002. The Sun Devils have played in 13 bowl games since this decision and are assured of at least one postseason game in the 2024 season, giving many recent players an extra game to accumulate statistics.
- The Pac-12 Conference held a championship game from 2011 until its collapse after the 2023 season. ASU's current home of the Big 12 has held its own championship game for most of its history. The Sun Devils played in the Pac-12 game in 2013 and the Big 12 game in 2024, giving players in those seasons yet another game to accumulate statistics.
- Due to COVID-19 disruptions, the NCAA did not count the 2020 season against the eligibility of any football player, giving all players active in that season five years of eligibility instead of the normal four.

These lists are updated through the 2025.

== Passing ==
=== Passing yards ===
Career
| Rk | Player | Yards | Years |
|---|---|---|---|
| 1 | Andrew Walter | 10,617 | 2001 2002 2003 2004 |
| 2 | Rudy Carpenter | 10,491 | 2005 2006 2007 2008 |
| 3 | Jake Plummer | 8,827 | 1993 1994 1995 1996 |
| 4 | Taylor Kelly | 8,819 | 2011 2012 2013 2014 |
| 5 | Manny Wilkins | 8,624 | 2015 2016 2017 2018 |
| 6 | Ryan Kealy | 6,912 | 1997 1998 1999 2000 |
| 7 | Danny White | 6,717 | 1971 1972 1973 |
| 8 | Jeff Van Raaphorst | 6,610 | 1984 1985 1986 |
| 9 | Jayden Daniels | 6,024 | 2019 2020 2021 |
| 10 | Paul Justin | 5,761 | 1987 1988 1989 1990 |

Single season
| Rk | Player | Yards | Year |
|---|---|---|---|
| 1 | Brock Osweiler | 4,036 | 2011 |
| 2 | Andrew Walter | 3,877 | 2002 |
| 3 | Mike Bercovici | 3,855 | 2015 |
| 4 | Taylor Kelly | 3,635 | 2013 |
| 5 | Manny Wilkins | 3,270 | 2017 |
| 6 | Rudy Carpenter | 3,202 | 2007 |
| 7 | Andrew Walter | 3,150 | 2004 |
| 8 | Andrew Walter | 3,044 | 2003 |
| 9 | Taylor Kelly | 3,040 | 2012 |
| 10 | Manny Wilkins | 3,025 | 2018 |

Single game
| Rk | Player | Yards | Year | Opponent |
|---|---|---|---|---|
| 1 | Andrew Walter | 536 | 2002 | Oregon |
| 2 | Paul Justin | 534 | 1989 | Washington State |
| 3 | Jeff Van Raaphorst | 532 | 1984 | Florida State |
| 4 | Ryan Kealy | 511 | 1998 | Arizona |
| 5 | Mike Bercovici | 510 | 2014 | USC |
| 6 | Mike Bercovici | 488 | 2014 | UCLA |
| 7 | Brock Osweiler | 487 | 2011 | Arizona |
| 8 | Andrew Walter | 477 | 2002 | North Carolina |
| 9 | Paul Justin | 474 | 1990 | Houston |
| 10 | Andrew Walter | 474 | 2002 | California |

=== Passing touchdowns ===
Career
| Rk | Player | TDs | Years |
|---|---|---|---|
| 1 | Andrew Walter | 85 | 2001 2002 2003 2004 |
| 2 | Rudy Carpenter | 81 | 2005 2006 2007 2008 |
| 3 | Taylor Kelly | 79 | 2011 2012 2013 2014 |
| 4 | Jake Plummer | 65 | 1993 1994 1995 1996 |
| 5 | Danny White | 64 | 1971 1972 1973 |
| 6 | Manny Wilkins | 52 | 2015 2016 2017 2018 |
| 7 | Mike Pagel | 48 | 1978 1979 1980 1981 |
| 8 | Dennis Sproul | 46 | 1974 1975 1976 1977 |
| 9 | Ryan Kealy | 46 | 1997 1998 1999 2000 |
| 10 | Jeff Van Raaphorst | 44 | 1984 1985 1986 |

Single season
| Rk | Player | TDs | Year |
|---|---|---|---|
| 1 | Andrew Walter | 30 | 2004 |
| 2 | Mike Bercovici | 30 | 2015 |
| 3 | Mike Pagel | 29 | 1981 |
| 4 | Taylor Kelly | 29 | 2012 |
| 5 | Andrew Walter | 28 | 2002 |
| 6 | Taylor Kelly | 28 | 2013 |
| 7 | Brock Osweiler | 26 | 2011 |
| 8 | Rudy Carpenter | 25 | 2007 |
| 9 | Danny White | 24 | 1973 |
| | Jake Plummer | 24 | 1996 |
| | Andrew Walter | 24 | 2003 |
| | Sam Leavitt | 24 | 2024 |

Single game
| Rk | Player | TDs | Year | Opponent |
|---|---|---|---|---|
| 1 | Mike Pagel | 7 | 1981 | Stanford |
| T-2 | Danny White | 6 | 1971 | New Mexico |
| T-2 | Andrew Walter | 6 | 2004 | UCLA |
| T-2 | Cutter Boley | 6 | 2026 | Morgan State |
| T-5 | Jeff Krohn | 5 | 2000 | Oregon |
| T-5 | Andrew Walter | 5 | 2002 | Stanford |
| T-5 | Andrew Walter | 5 | 2004 | Iowa |
| T-5 | Andrew Walter | 5 | 2004 | Washington State |
| T-5 | Taylor Kelly | 5 | 2012 | Colorado |
| T-5 | Taylor Kelly | 5 | 2013 | Sacramento State |
| T-5 | Taylor Kelly | 5 | 2013 | Washington State |
| T-5 | Mike Bercovici | 5 | 2014 | USC |
| T-5 | Mike Bercovici | 5 | 2015 | Colorado |
| T-5 | Mike Bercovici | 5 | 2015 | Oregon |

== Rushing ==
=== Rushing yards ===
Career
| Rk | Player | Yards | Years |
|---|---|---|---|
| 1 | Woody Green | 4,188 | 1971 1972 1973 |
| 2 | Freddie Williams | 3,424 | 1973 1974 1975 1976 |
| 3 | J. R. Redmond | 3,299 | 1996 1997 1998 1999 |
| 4 | Demario Richard | 3,202 | 2014 2015 2016 2017 |
| 5 | Wilford White | 3,173 | 1947 1948 1949 1950 |
| 6 | Leon Burton | 2,994 | 1955 1956 1957 1958 |
| 7 | Eno Benjamin | 2,867 | 2017 2018 2019 |
| 8 | Darryl Clack | 2,711 | 1982 1983 1984 1985 |
| 9 | Cameron Marshall | 2,700 | 2009 2010 2011 2012 |
| 10 | Art Malone | 2,649 | 1967 1968 1969 |

Single season
| Rk | Player | Yards | Year |
|---|---|---|---|
| 1 | Cam Skattebo | 1,711 | 2024 |
| 2 | Eno Benjamin | 1,642 | 2018 |
| 3 | Woody Green | 1,565 | 1972 |
| 4 | Wilford White | 1,502 | 1950 |
| 5 | Art Malone | 1,431 | 1968 |
| 6 | Freddie Williams | 1,427 | 1975 |
| 7 | Woody Green | 1,313 | 1973 |
| 8 | Woody Green | 1,310 | 1971 |
| 9 | Freddie Williams | 1,299 | 1974 |
| 10 | Ryan Torain | 1,229 | 2006 |

Single game
| Rk | Player | Yards | Year | Opponent |
|---|---|---|---|---|
| 1 | Eno Benjamin | 312 | 2018 | Oregon State |
| 2 | Cam Skattebo | 262 | 2024 | Mississippi State |
| 3 | Raleek Brown | 255 | 2025 | Colorado |
| 4 | Benny Malone | 250 | 1973 | Oregon State |
| 5 | Leon Burton | 243 | 1955 | Hardin-Simmons |
| 6 | Art Malone | 239 | 1968 | New Mexico |
| 7 | Wilford White | 236 | 1950 | BYU |
| 8 | Wilford White | 232 | 1950 | Northern Arizona |
| 9 | Jeff Sims | 228 | 2025 | Iowa State |
| 10 | Delvon Flowers | 226 | 2001 | Oregon State |

=== Rushing touchdowns ===
Career
| Rk | Player | TDs | Years |
|---|---|---|---|
| 1 | Woody Green | 43 | 1971 1972 1973 |
| 2 | Cameron Marshall | 38 | 2009 2010 2011 2012 |
| 3 | Leon Burton | 34 | 1956 1957 1958 |
| 4 | J. R. Redmond | 32 | 1996 1997 1998 1999 |
| 5 | Cam Skattebo | 30 | 2023 2024 |
| 6 | Art Malone | 28 | 1967 1968 1969 |
| 7 | Kalen Ballage | 27 | 2014 2015 2016 2017 |
| | Eno Benjamin | 27 | 2017 2018 2019 |
| 9 | Demario Richard | 26 | 2014 2015 2016 2017 |
| 10 | Benny Malone | 25 | 1971 1972 1973 |
| | Marion Grice | 25 | 2012 2013 |

Single season
| Rk | Player | TDs | Year |
|---|---|---|---|
| 1 | Cam Skattebo | 21 | 2024 |
| 2 | Woody Green | 19 | 1972 |
| 3 | Terry Battle | 18 | 1996 |
| | Cameron Marshall | 18 | 2011 |
| 5 | Wilford White | 17 | 1950 |
| 6 | Eno Benjamin | 16 | 2018 |
| | Xazavian Vallady | 16 | 2022 |
| 8 | Art Malone | 15 | 1968 |
| | Benny Malone | 15 | 1973 |
| | Rachaad White | 15 | 2021 |

Single game
| Rk | Player | TDs | Year | Opponent |
|---|---|---|---|---|
| 1 | Kalen Ballage | 7 | 2016 | Texas Tech |
| 2 | Benny Malone | 5 | 1973 | Oregon State |

== Receiving ==
=== Receptions ===
Career
| Rk | Player | Rec | Years |
|---|---|---|---|
| 1 | Derek Hagan | 258 | 2002 2003 2004 2005 |
| 2 | D. J. Foster | 222 | 2012 2013 2014 2015 |
| 3 | N'Keal Harry | 213 | 2016 2017 2018 |
| 4 | John Jefferson | 183 | 1974 1975 1976 1977 |
| 5 | Chris McGaha | 168 | 2006 2007 2008 2009 |
| 6 | Eric Guliford | 164 | 1989 1990 1991 1992 |
| 7 | Kyle Williams | 161 | 2016 2017 2018 2019 |
| 8 | Jaelen Strong | 157 | 2013 2014 |
| 10 | John Mistler | 156 | 1977 1978 1979 1980 |
| | Shaun McDonald | 156 | 2000 2001 2002 |

Single season
| Rk | Player | Rec | Year |
|---|---|---|---|
| 1 | Shaun McDonald | 87 | 2002 |
| 2 | Derek Hagan | 83 | 2004 |
| 3 | Jaelen Strong | 82 | 2014 |
| | N'Keal Harry | 82 | 2017 |
| 5 | Derek Hagan | 77 | 2005 |
| | Gerell Robinson | 77 | 2011 |
| 7 | Jaelen Strong | 75 | 2013 |
| | Jordyn Tyson | 75 | 2024 |
| 9 | N'Keal Harry | 73 | 2018 |
| 10 | Elijhah Badger | 70 | 2022 |
| | Reed Harris | 70 | 2026 |

Single game
| Rk | Player | Rec | Year | Opponent |
|---|---|---|---|---|
| 1 | Ron Fair | 19 | 1989 | Washington State |
| 2 | Chris McGaha | 15 | 2009 | Oregon State |
| 3 | Kyle Williams | 13 | 2009 | Washington State |
| | Gerell Robinson | 13 | 2011 | Boise State |
| | N'Keal Harry | 13 | 2017 | Texas Tech |
| 6 | Eric Guliford | 12 | 1990 | Houston |
| | Shaun McDonald | 12 | 2002 | Oregon |
| | Jaelen Strong | 12 | 2013 | Stanford |
| | Jaelen Strong | 12 | 2014 | UCLA |
| | Elijhah Badger | 12 | 2023 | Colorado |
| | Elijhah Badger | 12 | 2023 | UCLA |
| | Jordyn Tyson | 12 | 2024 | Kansas State |
| | Jordyn Tyson | 12 | 2025 | Northern Arizona |

=== Receiving yards ===
Career
| Rk | Player | Yards | Years |
|---|---|---|---|
| 1 | Derek Hagan | 3,939 | 2002 2003 2004 2005 |
| 2 | John Jefferson | 2,993 | 1974 1975 1976 1977 |
| 3 | N'Keal Harry | 2,889 | 2016 2017 2018 |
| 4 | Shaun McDonald | 2,867 | 2000 2001 2002 |
| 5 | Aaron Cox | 2,694 | 1984 1985 1986 1987 |
| 6 | Keith Poole | 2,691 | 1993 1994 1995 1996 |
| 7 | D. J. Foster | 2,458 | 2012 2013 2014 2015 |
| 8 | Eric Guliford | 2,408 | 1989 1990 1991 1992 |
| 9 | Jaelen Strong | 2,287 | 2013 2014 |
| 10 | Chris McGaha | 2,242 | 2006 2007 2008 2009 |

Single season
| Rk | Player | Yards | Year |
|---|---|---|---|
| 1 | Shaun McDonald | 1,405 | 2002 |
| 2 | Gerell Robinson | 1,397 | 2011 |
| 3 | Derek Hagan | 1,248 | 2004 |
| 4 | Derek Hagan | 1,210 | 2005 |
| 5 | Brandon Aiyuk | 1,192 | 2019 |
| 6 | Jaelen Strong | 1,165 | 2014 |
| 7 | Reed Harris | 1,159 | 2026 |
| 8 | Morris Owens | 1,144 | 1973 |
| 9 | N'Keal Harry | 1,142 | 2017 |
| 10 | Jaelen Strong | 1,122 | 2013 |

Single game
| Rk | Player | Yards | Year | Opponent |
|---|---|---|---|---|
| 1 | Ron Fair | 277 | 1989 | Washington State |
| 2 | Gerell Robinson | 241 | 2011 | Boise State |
| 3 | Eric Guliford | 232 | 1990 | Houston |
| 4 | Shaun McDonald | 221 | 2002 | Stanford |
| 5 | Larry Mucker | 206 | 1976 | BYU |
| 6 | Shaun McDonald | 204 | 2002 | Oregon |
| 7 | Jaelen Strong | 202 | 2014 | USC |
| 8 | Calvin Demery | 201 | 1969 | Minnesota |
| 9 | Keith Poole | 200 | 1995 | Nebraska |
| | Devin Lucien | 200 | 2015 | California |

=== Receiving touchdowns ===
Career
| Rk | Player | TDs | Years |
|---|---|---|---|
| 1 | Derek Hagan | 27 | 2002 2003 2004 2005 |
| 2 | Doug Allen | 25 | 1981 1982 1983 1984 |
| | Keith Poole | 25 | 1993 1994 1995 1996 |
| 4 | Shaun McDonald | 24 | 2000 2001 2002 |
| 5 | Steve Holden | 22 | 1970 1971 1972 |
| | N'Keal Harry | 22 | 2016 2017 2018 |
| 7 | J. D. Hill | 21 | 1967 1968 1969 1970 |
| | John Mistler | 21 | 1977 1978 1979 1980 |
| 9 | John Jefferson | 20 | 1974 1975 1976 1977 |
| 10 | Jordyn Tyson | 18 | 2023 2024 2025 |
| | Kyle Williams | 18 | 2006 2007 2008 2009 |

Single season
| Rk | Player | TDs | Year |
|---|---|---|---|
| 1 | Doug Allen | 14 | 1984 |
| 2 | Shaun McDonald | 13 | 2002 |
| 3 | Steve Holden | 12 | 1972 |
| 4 | J. D. Hill | 11 | 1970 |
| | Keith Poole | 11 | 1996 |
| | Reed Harris | 11 | 2026 |
| 7 | Shaun McDonald | 10 | 2001 |
| | Skyler Fulton | 10 | 2003 |
| | Derek Hagan | 10 | 2004 |
| | Michael Jones | 10 | 2007 |
| | Jaelen Strong | 10 | 2014 |
| | Jordyn Tyson | 10 | 2024 |

Single game
| Rk | Player | TDs | Year | Opponent |
|---|---|---|---|---|
| 1 | John Allen | 4 | 1953 | San Jose State |
| | Shaun McDonald | 4 | 2001 | Louisiana-Lafayette |
| | Shaun McDonald | 4 | 2002 | San Diego State |

== Total offense ==
Total offense is the sum of passing and rushing statistics. It does not include receiving or returns.

=== Total offense yards ===
Career
| Rk | Player | Yards | Years |
|---|---|---|---|
| 1 | Taylor Kelly | 10,223 | 2011 2012 2013 2014 |
| 2 | Rudy Carpenter | 10,196 | 2005 2006 2007 2008 |
| 3 | Andrew Walter | 10,142 | 2001 2002 2003 2004 |
| 4 | Manny Wilkins | 9,659 | 2015 2016 2017 2018 |
| 5 | Jake Plummer | 8,711 | 1993 1994 1995 1996 |
| 6 | Jayden Daniels | 7,312 | 2019 2020 2021 |
| 7 | Danny White | 7,257 | 1971 1972 1973 |
| 8 | Jeff Van Raaphorst | 6,418 | 1984 1985 1986 |
| 9 | Dennis Sproul | 6,128 | 1974 1975 1976 1977 |
| 10 | Ryan Kealy | 6,086 | 1997 1998 1999 2000 |

Single season
| Rk | Player | Yards | Year |
|---|---|---|---|
| 1 | Taylor Kelly | 4,243 | 2013 |
| 2 | Brock Osweiler | 4,126 | 2011 |
| 3 | Mike Bercovici | 3,939 | 2015 |
| 4 | Andrew Walter | 3,661 | 2002 |
| 5 | Taylor Kelly | 3,556 | 2012 |
| 6 | Manny Wilkins | 3,552 | 2017 |
| 7 | Manny Wilkins | 3,477 | 2018 |
| 8 | Sam Leavitt | 3,328 | 2024 |
| 9 | Jayden Daniels | 3,298 | 2019 |
| 10 | Danny White | 3,107 | 1973 |

Single game
| Rk | Player | Yards | Year | Opponent |
|---|---|---|---|---|
| 1 | Jeff Van Raaphorst | 532 | 1984 | Florida State |
| 2 | Paul Justin | 512 | 1989 | Washington State |
| 3 | Andrew Walter | 508 | 2002 | Oregon |
| 4 | Mike Bercovici | 505 | 2014 | USC |
| | Mike Bercovici | 505 | 2014 | UCLA |
| 6 | Rudy Carpenter | 498 | 2005 | Rutgers |
| 7 | Ryan Kealy | 482 | 1998 | Arizona |
| 8 | Brock Osweiler | 480 | 2011 | Arizona |

=== Touchdowns responsible for ===
"Touchdowns responsible for" is the NCAA's official term for combined passing and rushing touchdowns.

Career
| Rk | Player | TDs | Years |
|---|---|---|---|
| 1 | Taylor Kelly | 92 | 2011 2012 2013 2014 |
| 2 | Andrew Walter | 85 | 2001 2002 2003 2004 |
| 3 | Rudy Carpenter | 83 | 2005 2006 2007 2008 |
| 4 | Danny White | 78 | 1971 1972 1973 |
| 5 | Manny Wilkins | 72 | 2015 2016 2017 2018 |
| 6 | Jake Plummer | 69 | 1993 1994 1995 1996 |
| 7 | Mike Pagel | 61 | 1978 1979 1980 1981 |
| 8 | Dennis Sproul | 55 | 1974 1975 1976 1977 |
| 9 | Mike Bercovici | 48 | 2011 2013 2014 2015 |
| 10 | Ryan Kealy | 47 | 1997 1998 1999 2000 |

Single season
| Rk | Player | TDs | Year |
|---|---|---|---|
| 1 | Taylor Kelly | 37 | 2013 |
| 2 | Mike Bercovici | 36 | 2015 |
| 3 | Mike Pagel | 33 | 1981 |
| 4 | Andrew Walter | 30 | 2004 |
| 5 | Taylor Kelly | 30 | 2012 |
| 6 | Brock Osweiler | 29 | 2011 |
| | Sam Leavitt | 29 | 2024 |
| 8 | Danny White | 28 | 1972 |
| | Danny White | 28 | 1973 |
| | Andrew Walter | 28 | 2002 |
| | Manny Wilkins | 28 | 2018 |

Single game
| Rk | Player | TDs | Year | Opponent |
|---|---|---|---|---|
| 1 | Mike Pagel | 7 | 1981 | Stanford |
| | Taylor Kelly | 7 | 2013 | Washington State |
| | Kalen Ballage | 7 | 2016 | Texas Tech |

== Defense ==
=== Interceptions ===
Career
| Rk | Player | Ints | Years |
|---|---|---|---|
| 1 | Mike Richardson | 18 | 1979 1980 1981 1982 |

Single season
| Rk | Player | Ints | Year |
|---|---|---|---|
| 1 | Henry Rich | 12 | 1950 |
| 2 | Seth Miller | 11 | 1969 |
| | Mike Haynes | 11 | 1974 |
| 4 | Joe Zuger | 10 | 1960 |
| 5 | Wes Plummer | 8 | 1967 |
| | Mike Richardson | 8 | 1980 |
| | Eric Allen | 8 | 1987 |

Single game
| Rk | Player | Ints | Year | Opponent |
|---|---|---|---|---|
| 1 | Manuel Aja | 4 | 1950 | Miami (Ohio) |

=== Tackles ===
Career
| Rk | Player | Tackles | Years |
|---|---|---|---|
| 1 | Greg Battle | 425 | 1982 1983 1984 1985 |
| 2 | Joey Lumpkin | 377 | 1978 1979 1980 1981 |
| 3 | Jimmy Williams | 375 | 1981 1982 1983 1984 |
| 4 | Brett Wallerstedt | 362 | 1989 1990 1991 1992 |
| 5 | Nathan LaDuke | 360 | 1987 1988 1989 1990 |
| 6 | Bob Breunig | 353 | 1972 1973 1974 |

Single season
| Rk | Player | Tackles | Year |
|---|---|---|---|
| 1 | Mark Tingstad | 172 | 1988 |
| 2 | Joey Lumpkin | 158 | 1980 |
| 3 | Jimmy Williams | 153 | 1982 |
| 4 | Bob Breunig | 145 | 1974 |
| | Jimmy Williams | 145 | 1983 |
| 6 | Greg Clark | 141 | 1987 |

=== Sacks ===
Career
| Rk | Player | Sacks | Years |
|---|---|---|---|
| 1 | Terrell Suggs | 44.0 | 2000 2001 2002 |
| 2 | Shante Carver | 41.0 | 1990 1991 1992 1993 |
| 3 | Dexter Davis | 31.0 | 2006 2007 2008 2009 |
| 4 | Vernon Maxwell | 28.0 | 1979 1980 1981 1982 |
| 5 | Scott Stephen | 26.0 | 1983 1984 1985 1986 |
| 6 | Bob Kohrs | 22.0 | 1978 1979 |
| 7 | Carl Bradford | 21.5 | 2011 2012 2013 2014 |
| 8 | Will Sutton | 20.5 | 2009 2011 2012 2013 |
| 9 | Jim Jeffcoat | 20.0 | 1979 1980 1981 1982 |
| 10 | DJ Calhoun | 19.5 | 2014 2015 2016 2017 |

Single season
| Rk | Player | Sacks | Year |
|---|---|---|---|
| 1 | Terrell Suggs | 24.0 | 2002 |
| 2 | Al Harris | 19.0 | 1978 |
| 3 | Bob Kohrs | 14.0 | 1978 |
| 4 | Will Sutton | 13.0 | 2012 |
| 5 | Vernon Maxwell | 12.0 | 1982 |
| | Derrick Rodgers | 12.0 | 1996 |
| 7 | Carl Bradford | 11.5 | 2012 |
| 8 | Shante Carver | 11.0 | 1991 |
| | Dexter Davis | 11.0 | 2008 |
| | Antonio Longino | 11.0 | 2015 |

== Kicking ==
=== Field goals made ===
Career
| Rk | Player | FGs | Years |
|---|---|---|---|
| 1 | Zane Gonzalez | 96 | 2013 2014 2015 2016 |
| 2 | Luis Zendejas | 81 | 1981 1982 1983 1984 |
| 3 | Thomas Weber | 68 | 2007 2008 2009 2010 |
| 4 | Jesse Ainsworth | 51 | 2003 2004 2005 2006 |
| 5 | Mike Barth | 49 | 1999 2000 2001 2002 |
| 6 | Mike Richey | 39 | 1989 1990 1991 1992 |
| | Robert Nycz | 39 | 1995 1996 1997 |
| 8 | Brandon Ruiz | 37 | 2017 2018 |
| 9 | Kent Bostrom | 36 | 1985 1986 1987 |
| 10 | Jon Baker | 35 | 1993 1994 |

Single season
| Rk | Player | FGs | Year |
|---|---|---|---|
| 1 | Luis Zendejas | 28 | 1983 |
| 2 | Zane Gonzalez | 26 | 2015 |
| 3 | Zane Gonzalez | 25 | 2013 |
| 4 | Luis Zendejas | 24 | 1982 |
| | Thomas Weber | 24 | 2007 |
| 6 | Mike Barth | 23 | 2002 |
| | Zane Gonzalez | 23 | 2016 |
| | Cristian Zendejas | 23 | 2019 |
| 9 | Zane Gonzalez | 22 | 2014 |
| | Jesus Gomez | 22 | 2025 |

Single game
| Rk | Player | FGs | Year | Opponent |
|---|---|---|---|---|
| 1 | Zane Gonzalez | 6 | 2015 | California |
| 2 | Luis Zendejas | 5 | 1983 | Stanford |
| | Robert Nycz | 5 | 1997 | Miami (Florida) |
| | Thomas Weber | 5 | 2009 | Idaho State |
| | Thomas Weber | 5 | 2010 | Arizona |
