= Damarious Randall =

American football player (born 1992)

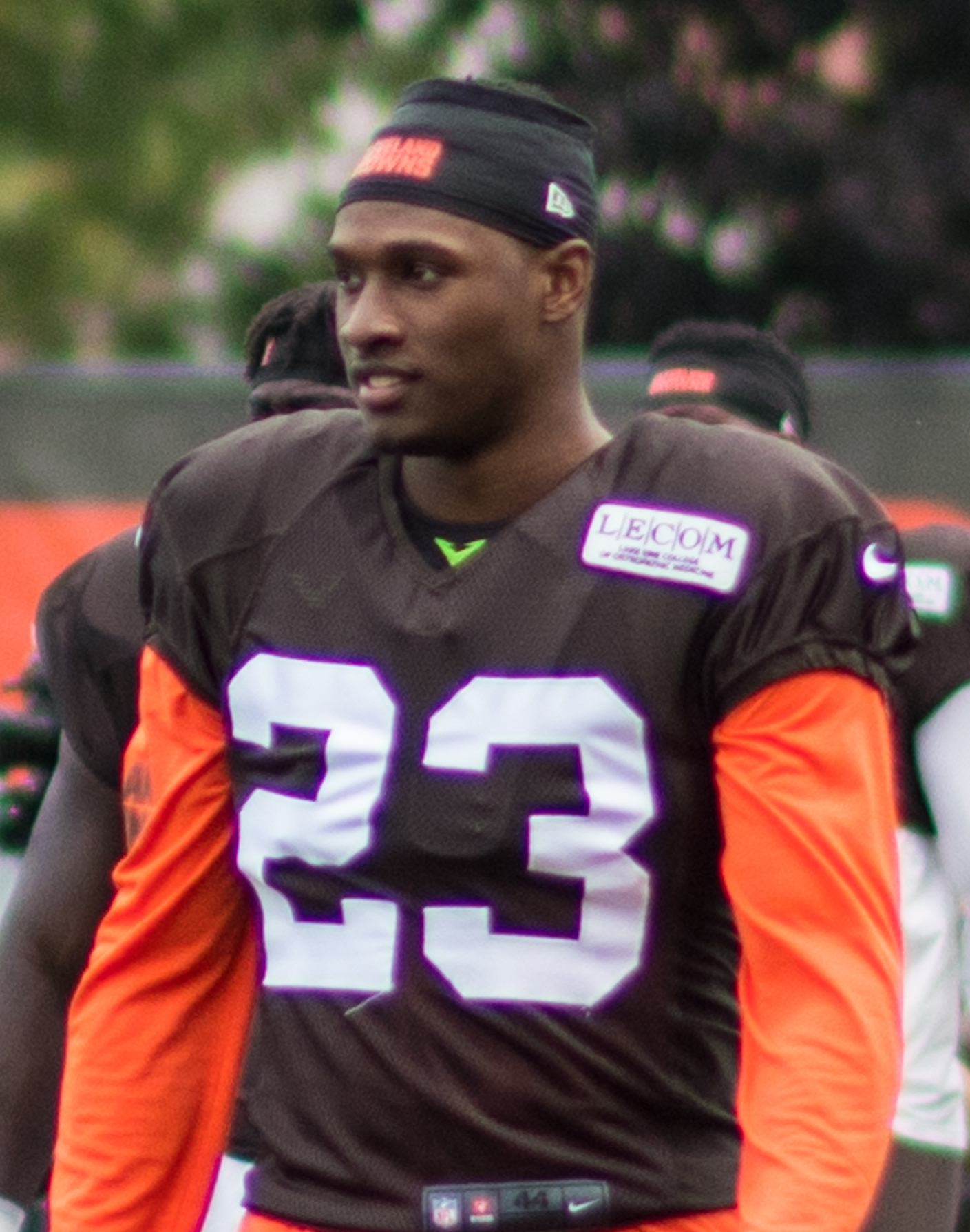
- Randall with the Cleveland Browns in 2018

No. 23, 36
- Position: Cornerback

Personal information
- Born: August 29, 1992 (age 34); Pensacola, Florida, U.S.
- Listed height: 5 ft 11 in (1.80 m)
- Listed weight: 196 lb (89 kg)

Career information
- High school: Pensacola
- College: Mesa (2012); Arizona State (2013–2014)
- NFL draft: 2015: 1st round, 30th overall pick

Career history
- Green Bay Packers (2015–2017); Cleveland Browns (2018–2019); Las Vegas Raiders (2020)*; Seattle Seahawks (2020); Los Angeles Rams (2021)
- * Offseason or practice squad member only

Awards and highlights
- First-team All-Pac-12 (2014)

Career NFL statistics
- Total tackles: 293
- Sacks: 2.5
- Fumble recoveries: 2
- Pass deflections: 47
- Interceptions: 14
- Defensive touchdowns: 2
- Stats at Pro Football Reference

Damarious Wayne Randall (born August 29, 1992) is an American former professional football player who was a cornerback in the National Football League (NFL). He played college football for the Arizona State Sun Devils and was selected by the Green Bay Packers in the first round of the 2015 NFL draft.

== Early life ==
Randall played as a cornerback, safety, and wide receiver and returned punts and kickoffs at Pensacola High School, earning all-state recognition as a senior and all-conference honors as a junior and senior. He helped lead the team to a Class 3A title as a senior in 2009, when the Tigers outscored their opponents 95–13 in the postseason. He also lettered all four years in baseball as a shortstop and four years in track & field, participating in the long jump (23'11") and the 4 × 100 relay (44.10 seconds).

== College career ==
Randall played college baseball at Butler Community College for a year before transferring to Mesa Community College to play college football. He saw his first action in 2012 and recorded 69 tackles, ten interceptions and five total touchdowns. The next year, he transferred to Arizona State University. He entered his first year at Arizona State and missed the first four games because of a lower leg injury and then started the rest of the season and recorded 71 tackles, three interceptions and a touchdown. As a senior in 2014, Randall started all 13 games. He finished the year with a team-leading 106 tackles, three interceptions, 4 forced fumbles, one sack and a touchdown.

== Professional career ==
=== Pre-draft ===
On December 14, 2014, it was announced that Randall accepted his invitation to play in the 2015 Senior Bowl. On January 24, 2015, Randall played in the Reese's Senior Bowl and recorded a tackle and a pass breakup as part of Arizona Cardinals head coach Ken Whisenhunt's North team that defeated the South 34–13. Randall was one of 54 defensive backs that attended the NFL Scouting Combine in Indianapolis, Indiana. He completed all of the combine drills and finished eighth among defensive backs in the vertical jump and tenth among his position group in the 40-yard dash and three-cone drill. On March 6, 2015, Randall attended Arizona State's pro day, along with Jaelen Strong, Marcus Hardison, Jamil Douglas, Taylor Kelly, and eight other prospects. He chose to stand on his combine numbers and only ran positional drills for scouts and team representatives from all 32 NFL teams. During the draft process, Randall attended private visits and workouts with 11 NFL teams, including the New England Patriots, Seattle Seahawks, Philadelphia Eagles, New York Giants, Dallas Cowboys, Carolina Panthers, and Cleveland Browns. At the conclusion of the pre-draft process, Randall was projected to be a late first round or second round pick by NFL draft experts and analysts. He was ranked the top safety prospect in the draft by NFL analyst Mike Mayock, was ranked the top free safety in the draft by NFLDraftScout.com, was ranked the second best safety by NFL analyst Charles Davis, and was ranked the seventh best safety by Sports Illustrated.

Pre-draft measurables
Height	Weight	Arm length	Hand span	Wingspan	40-yard dash	10-yard split	20-yard split	20-yard shuttle	Three-cone drill	Vertical jump	Broad jump	Bench press	Wonderlic
5 ft 10 7/8 in (1.80 m)	196 lb (89 kg)	30 1/4 in (0.77 m)	8 5/8 in (0.22 m)	6 ft 2 5/8 in (1.90 m)	4.46 s	1.55 s	2.58 s	4.07 s	6.83 s	38.0 in (0.97 m)	10 ft 0 in (3.05 m)	14 reps	18
All values from NFL Combine

=== Green Bay Packers ===
==== 2015 ====
The Green Bay Packers selected Randall in the first round (30th overall) of the 2015 NFL draft. He was the first safety selected in 2015 and was the highest draft pick from Arizona State since Terrell Suggs in 2003. On June 16, 2015, the Packers signed Randall to a four-year, $7.91 million contract that includes $5.96 million guaranteed and a signing bonus of $4.0 million.

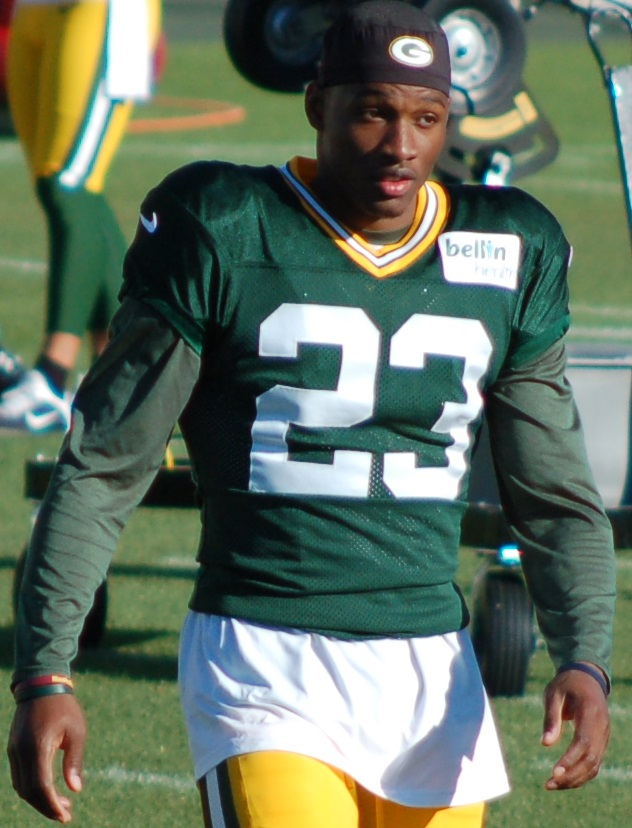
Randall during Green Bay Packers training camp in 2015

Although he played safety in college, the Packers drafted him with plans to strictly play him at cornerback. He entered training camp slated as the third cornerback on the depth chart behind Sam Shields and Casey Hayward. Head coach Mike McCarthy officially named him the third cornerback to start the regular season.

He made his professional regular season debut in the Packers' season-opening at the Chicago Bears and recorded one tackle and two pass deflections during their 31–23 victory. On October 18, 2015, Randall earned his first career start and recorded a season-high seven solo tackles and deflected two passes during the Packers' 27–20 victory against the San Diego Chargers. During the game Randall deflected a game-tying touchdown pass by Philip Rivers and earned Castrol Edge Clutch Performer of the Week for his performance. In Week 8, he made seven combined tackles, deflected a pass, and made his first career interception off a pass attempt by Peyton Manning in Green Bay's 29–10 loss at the Denver Broncos. The following week, Randall started at outside cornerback in place of Sam Shields, who suffered a shoulder injury the previous week. Randall collected five solo tackles, deflected two passes, and intercepted Carolina Panthers quarterback Cam Newton during a 37–29 loss. In Week 12, Randall made two solo tackles in a 17–13 loss to the Chicago Bears. He left the game after suffering a knee injury and was inactive for Week 13. On December 20, 2015, he made his fifth start in place of Sam Shields and recorded seven combined tackles, deflected a pass, and returned an interception by Derek Carr for a 43-yard touchdown in the Packers' 30–20 victory at the Oakland Raiders. It marked the first touchdown of Randall's career. He finished his rookie season with a career-high 58 combined tackles (53 solo), 14 pass deflections, three interceptions, and a touchdown in 15 games and nine starts.

The Packers finished second in the NFC North the 2015 season with a 10–6 record. On January 10, 2016, Randall started in his first career playoff game and recorded eight combined tackles and defended a pass in a 35–14 win at the Washington Redskins in the NFC Wildcard game. The following week, he made three combined tackles, deflected a pass, and intercepted a pass attempt by Carson Palmer during a 26–20 loss at the Cardinals in the NFC Divisional round.

==== 2016 ====
Throughout training camp, Randall competed against Quinten Rollins and LaDarius Gunter for the vacant starting cornerback position after Casey Hayward departed for the San Diego Chargers in free agency. He was named the starting cornerback along with Sam Shields to start the regular season.

He started the Packers' season-opener at the Jacksonville Jaguars and recorded a season-high six solo tackles and two pass deflections during a 27–23 victory. On September 25, 2016, he made two combined tackles, defended a pass, and returned an interception by Matthew Stafford 44-yards in the Packers' 34–27 victory against the Detroit Lions. He suffered a groin injury in Week 4 and was inactive the following week. On October 16, 2016, Randall made two solo tackles in a 30–16 loss to the Cowboys. He aggravated his groin injury and missed the next five games (Weeks 7–11) after undergoing surgery. On December 11, 2016, Randall made five combined tackles, deflected two passes, and intercepted Seahawks' quarterback Russell Wilson twice during a 37–10 victory. Randall finished the 2016 season with 39 combined tackles (35 solo), nine pass deflections, and three interceptions in ten games and nine starts.

The Packers finished atop the NFC North with a 10–6 record. On January 8, 2017, Randall made five combined tackles three pass deflections, and an interception during their 38–13 NFC Wildcard victory over the Giants. After defeating the Cowboys, the Packers were defeated by the Atlanta Falcons in the NFC Championship.

==== 2017 ====
Head coach Mike McCarthy named Randall the starting cornerback, along with Davon House, after the Packers chose not to re-sign Sam Shields.

He started the Packers' season-opener against the Seahawks and recorded a season-high six solo tackles and a pass breakup in their 17–9 victory. On October 8, 2017, Randall made one tackle, deflected a pass, and returned an interception by Dak Prescott for a 21-yard touchdown during the Packers' 35–31 victory at the Cowboys. In Week 7, he collected three combined tackles, broke up a pass, and made an interception during a 26–17 loss to the New Orleans Saints. It was his third consecutive game with an interception. On December 22, 2017, the Packers placed Randall on injured/reserve for the remainder of the season after he suffered a knee injury. He finished the 2017 season with 47 combined tackles (38 solo), nine pass deflections, four interceptions, and a touchdown in 14 games and 12 starts.

=== Cleveland Browns ===
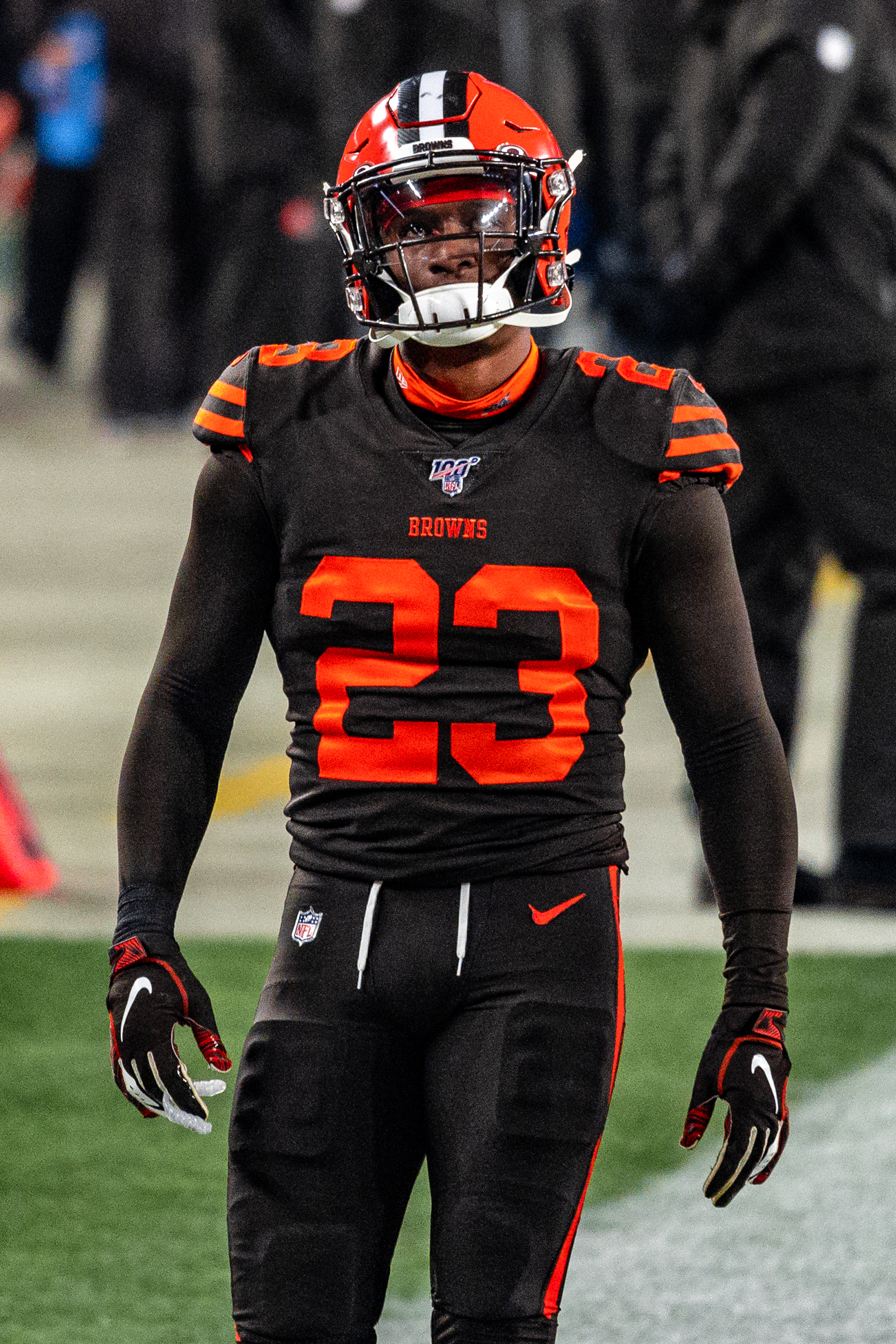
Randall playing for the Browns in 2019.

On March 9, 2018, the Packers agreed to trade Randall to the Cleveland Browns in exchange for DeShone Kizer and a swap of both fourth and fifth-round draft picks. The deal became official on March 14, at the start of the NFL year. On April 30, the Browns exercised the fifth-year option on Randall's contract. In Week 4 against the Oakland Raiders, Randall intercepted quarterback Derek Carr and made 6 tackles in the 45–42 overtime loss.

On November 14, 2019, Randall was ejected after a helmet-to-helmet hit on Pittsburgh Steelers wide receiver Diontae Johnson. The Browns still celebrated a 21–7 win over the Steelers.

=== Las Vegas Raiders ===
On April 7, 2020, the Las Vegas Raiders signed Randall to a one-year contract. He was released by Las Vegas on September 4.

=== Seattle Seahawks ===
On September 30, 2020, Randall was signed to the Seattle Seahawks' practice squad. He was elevated to the active roster on October 3 and October 10 for the team's Weeks 4 and 5 games against the Miami Dolphins and Minnesota Vikings, and reverted to the practice squad after each game. He was promoted to the active roster on October 21. He was placed on the reserve/COVID-19 list by the team on January 2, 2021, and activated four days later.

The Seahawks re-signed Randall on April 9, 2021, and moved him to cornerback. He was released by the Seahawks on August 31.

=== Los Angeles Rams ===
On December 18, 2021, Randall was signed to the Los Angeles Rams' practice squad. He was later released from the practice squad before the Rams won Super Bowl LVI.

== NFL career statistics ==
Legend
**Bold**	Career high

Regular season
Year	Team	Games		Tackles					Interceptions						Fumbles	
Year	Team	GP	GS	Cmb	Solo	Ast	Sck	Sfty	PD	Int	Yds	Avg	Lng	TD	FF	FR
2015	GB	15	9	58	53	5	0.0	0	**14**	3	47	15.7	43	**1**	0	0
2016	GB	10	9	39	35	4	0.0	0	9	3	**91**	**30.3**	44	0	0	0
2017	GB	14	12	47	38	9	0.0	0	9	**4**	35	110.6	21	**1**	0	0
2018	CLE	15	15	**85**	**72**	13	0.0	0	9	**4**	59	14.8	**50**	0	0	0
2019	CLE	11	11	61	45	**16**	**2.5**	0	6	0	0	0.0	0	0	0	0
Total		65	56	290	243	47	2.5	0	47	14	232	16.6	50	2	0	0
Source: NFL.com

Postseason
Year	Team	Games		Tackles					Interceptions						Fumbles	
Year	Team	GP	GS	Cmb	Solo	Ast	Sck	Sfty	PD	Int	Yds	Avg	Lng	TD	FF	FR
2015	GB	2	2	11	7	**4**	0.0	0	2	**1**	0	0.0	0	0	0	0
2016	GB	3	1	**12**	**11**	1	0.0	0	**3**	**1**	**78**	**78.0**	**78**	0	0	0
Total		5	3	23	18	5	0.0	0	5	2	78	39.0	78	0	0	0
Source: pro-football-reference.com

== Personal life ==
Early in his tenure with the Browns, Randall incited anger from Clevelanders by openly cheering for the Golden State Warriors to defeat the hometown Cavs in the NBA Finals. As a make-good, he offered to purchase jerseys for everyone who retweeted one of his posts if the Cavs did indeed go on to win the championship (they did not win). That tweet became the most re-tweeted ever for a professional athlete, and in 2020 is the 23rd most re-tweeted tweet of all time.
