= 2014 Sun Bowl =

American college football game

2014 Hyundai Sun Bowl
- 81st Sun Bowl
Arizona State Sun Devils	Duke Blue Devils
(9–3)	(9–3)
Pac-12	ACC
36	31
Head coach: Todd Graham	Head coach: David Cutcliffe
AP / Coaches / CFP; 15 / 16 / 15
	1	2	3	4	Total
Arizona State	10	10	10	6	36
Duke	3	14	0	14	31
- Date: December 27, 2014
- Season: 2014
- Stadium: Sun Bowl
- Location: El Paso, Texas
- Favorite: Arizona State by 7.5
- National anthem: Karen Twitty
- Referee: Hubert Owens (SEC)
- Halftime show: Lonestar
- Attendance: 47,809
- Payout: US$1.9 million per team

United States TV coverage
- Network: CBS/Sports USA
- Announcers: Carter Blackburn, Gary Danielson, & Allie LaForce (CBS); Wayne Randazzo & Tony Graziani (Sports USA)

The 2014 Sun Bowl was an American college football bowl game that was played on December 27, 2014, at Sun Bowl Stadium in El Paso, Texas. In this 81st edition of the Sun Bowl, Arizona State from the Pac-12 Conference met Duke from the Atlantic Coast Conference. The game started at 12:00 noon MST, and was televised on CBS and heard on the Sports USA Radio Network. It was one of the 2014–15 bowl games that will conclude the 2014 FBS football season. The game was sponsored by the Hyundai Motor Company and was officially known as the Hyundai Sun Bowl.

== Teams ==
Teams playing in this bowl were announced on December 7, 2014. This was the first meeting between these two teams.

== Game summary ==
=== Scoring summary ===
Scoring summary

Quarter	Time	Drive			Team	Scoring information	Score	
Quarter	Time	Plays	Yards	TOP	Team	Scoring information	ASU	Duke
1	10:50	5	49	1:33	ASU	Demario Richard 9-yard touchdown run, Zane Gonzalez kick good	7	0
1	7:39	7	68	1:43	ASU	28-yard field goal by Zane Gonzalez	10	0
1	2:59	11	43	4:40	Duke	40-yard field goal by Ross Martin	10	3
2	12:55	14	54	5:04	ASU	38-yard field goal by Zane Gonzalez	13	3
2	7:31	12	66	4:23	ASU	Demario Richard 1-yard touchdown run, Zane Gonzalez kick good	20	3
2	3:44	8	78	3:47	Duke	Shaquille Powell 14-yard touchdown reception from Anthony Boone, Ross Martin kick good	20	10
2	1:49	3	7	1:55	Duke	Jamison Crowder 68-yard punt return for a touchdown, Ross Martin kick good	20	17
3	11:08	8	75	3:52	ASU	Demario Richard 11-yard touchdown reception from Taylor Kelly, Zane Gonzalez kick good	27	17
3	2:23	7	34	2:43	ASU	47-yard field goal by Zane Gonzalez	30	17
4	10:10	15	69	7:13	Duke	Johnell Barnes 14-yard touchdown reception from Anthony Boone, Ross Martin kick good	30	24
4	5:03	11	60	4:19	Duke	Issac Blakeney 12-yard touchdown reception from Jamison Crowder, Ross Martin kick good	30	31
4	4:45	1	4	0:18	ASU	Demario Richard 4-yard touchdown reception from Taylor Kelly, 2-point run failed	36	31
"TOP" = time of possession. For other American football terms, see Glossary of American football.							36	31

=== Statistics ===
Statistics	ASU	Duke
First downs	22	21
Plays–yards	69–392	77–400
Rushes–yards	35–152	44–165
Passing yards	240	235
Passing: Comp–Att–Int	24–34–0	17–33–1
Time of possession	24:53	35:07

== See also ==
- 2025 Sun Bowl, the second meeting of Duke and Arizona State
