= Zane Gonzalez =

American football player (born 1995)

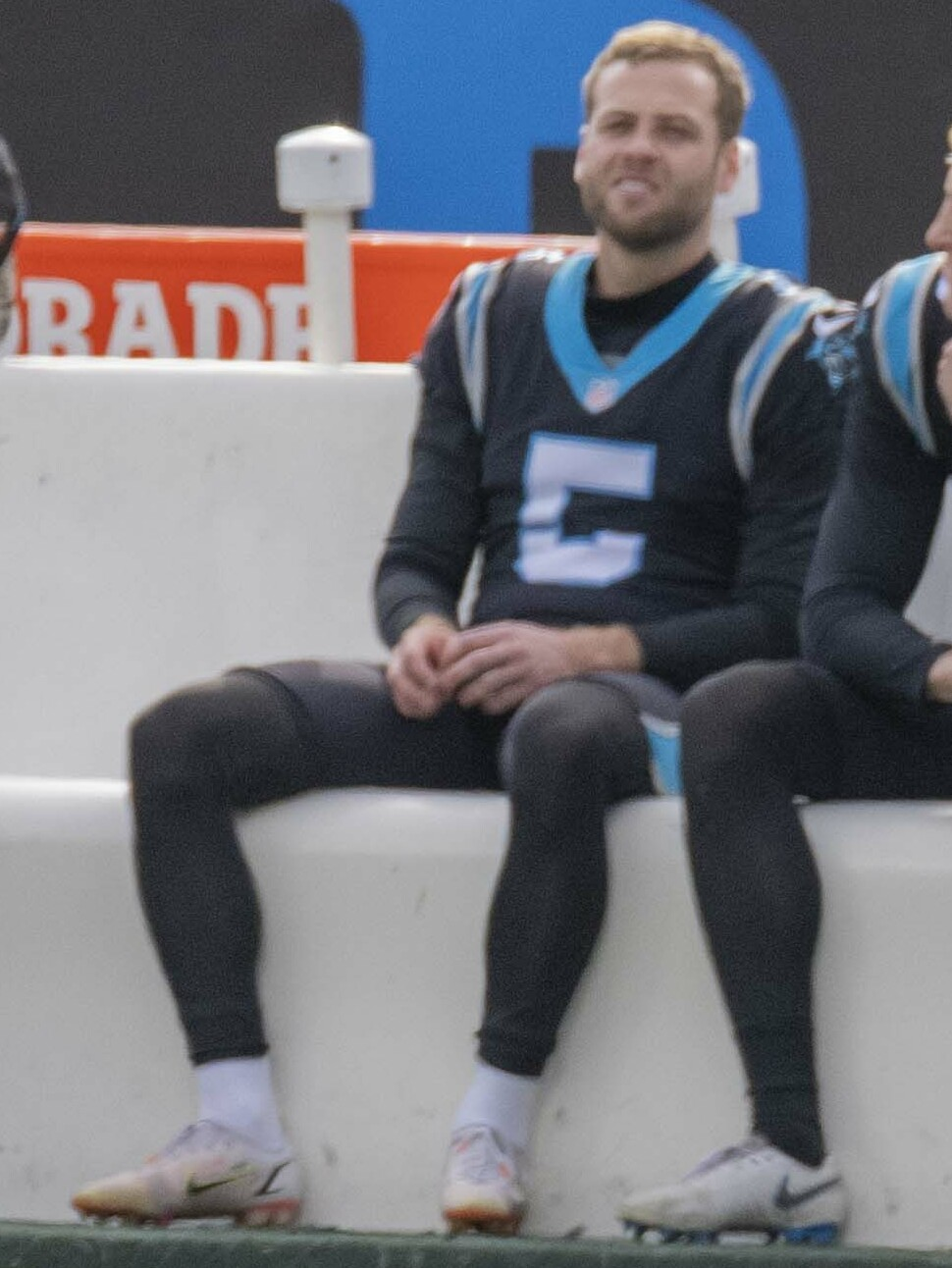
- Gonzalez with the Carolina Panthers in 2021

Profile
- Position: Placekicker

Personal information
- Born: May 7, 1995 (age 31); Deer Park, Texas, U.S.
- Listed height: 6 ft 0 in (1.83 m)
- Listed weight: 200 lb (91 kg)

Career information
- High school: Deer Park
- College: Arizona State (2013–2016)
- NFL draft: 2017: 7th round, 224th overall pick

Career history
- Cleveland Browns (2017–2018); Arizona Cardinals (2018–2020); Detroit Lions (2021)*; Carolina Panthers (2021–2022); San Francisco 49ers (2023)*; Washington Commanders (2024); Atlanta Falcons (2025); Miami Dolphins (2026)
- * Offseason or practice squad member only

Awards and highlights
- Unanimous All-American (2016); Lou Groza Award (2016); 2× first-team All-Pac-12 (2013, 2016); Second-team All-Pac-12 (2014)

Career NFL statistics as of Week 10, 2026
- Field goals made: 121
- Field goal attempts: 152
- Field goal percentage: 79.6%
- Longest field goal: 57
- Touchbacks: 191
- Stats at Pro Football Reference

Zane Holden Fortunato Gonzalez (born May 7, 1995) is an American professional football placekicker. He played college football for the Arizona State Sun Devils, finishing as the NCAA Division I leader in field goals made at the time prior to being selected by the Cleveland Browns in the seventh round of the 2017 NFL draft. Gonzalez was a unanimous All-American and won the Lou Groza Award in 2016.

== College career ==
Arizona State University (ASU) signed Gonzalez on March 28, 2013. He played college football for the Sun Devils from 2013 to 2016.

During his freshman year in 2013, Gonzalez played every game, connecting on 25 of 30 (83.3%) field goals and converting all 63 extra point attempts. Gonzalez had a streak of 18 field goals converted, an ASU freshman record. He was awarded with a First Team All-Pac-12 Conference selection. Gonzalez broke the ASU record for points by a kicker with 138 on the season and tying the NCAA record for field goals made by a freshman.

During his sophomore year in 2014, Gonzalez connected on 22 of 27 (81.5%) field goals and was 50–52 on extra points. Gonzalez was awarded with a Second-Team All-Pac-12 selection. On October 18, he matched a then-career-high with four field goals against Stanford. On November 11, Gonzalez kicked four field goals including a game-winning field goal in overtime against Utah. He was named the Pac-12 Special Teams Player of the Week. On December 27, Gonzalez kicked three field goals in the 2014 Sun Bowl.

During his junior season in 2015, Gonzalez scored on 26 of 34 (76.5) field goals and converted all 52 extra point attempts. On November 28, Gonzalez matched the Pac-12 record with an ASU school-record six field goals against California. On January 2, 2016, he kicked four field goals against West Virginia in the 2016 Cactus Bowl. He became the school's all-time scoring leader in the third quarter, surpassing Luis Zendejas (380).

During his senior year in 2016, Gonzalez recorded 23-of-25 (92.0%) field goals and only missed one of 40 extra-point attempts. On September 16, Gonzalez kicked four field goals against UTSA. He is the first Sun Devil in history to kick more than one 50-yarder in a game. With his second field goal of the night early in the second quarter, Zane Gonzalez broke the Pac-12 record for points scored in a career with his 416th. He was named the Pac-12 Special Teams Player of the Week. On September 24, Gonzalez kicked three field goals and six extra points against California. With his three field goals, Gonzalez moved into 4th in NCAA history for career field goals at 84. Gonzalez's first field goal of the night broke the school record for career-made field goals. He was named the Pac-12 Special Teams Player of the Week. On October 8, he kicked three field goals against UCLA. Gonzalez broke the NCAA career field goals made record with his 89th career field goal in the fourth quarter. He was named the Pac-12 Special Teams Player of the Week for the third time. On October 15, he kicked three field goals against Colorado. He holds the record for career points by a kicker with 468, passing FSU’s Dustin Hopkins (466). He also tied the NCAA record for most 50+ yard field goals in a game with three. He was named to his fourth Pac-12 Special Teams Player of the Week, becoming the second player ever to do this, joining California kicker Doug Brien. On December 8, he was awarded the Lou Groza Award, becoming the second player in ASU history, joining Thomas Weber (2007). On December 12, he was named a unanimous All-American, becoming the third in school history and the first since Terrell Suggs earned the honor in 2002.

In the 2017 Senior Bowl, Gonzalez kicked three field goals, tying a record held since 1985.

== Professional career ==
Pre-draft measurables
Height	Weight	Arm length	Hand span	Wingspan
6 ft 0 1/2 in (1.84 m)	202 lb (92 kg)	29 1/2 in (0.75 m)	9 in (0.23 m)	5 ft 11 1/8 in (1.81 m)
All values from NFL Combine

=== Cleveland Browns ===
==== 2017 season ====
The Cleveland Browns selected Gonzalez in the seventh round (224th overall) of the 2017 NFL draft. On May 16, 2017, the Browns signed him to a four-year, $2.48 million contract with a signing bonus of $89,156. Gonzalez competed with incumbent kicker Cody Parkey for the starting job during Cleveland's 2017 training camp. The Browns decided on Gonzalez as their kicker for the season on September 1, 2017.

On September 10, 2017, in the season-opening 21–18 loss to the Pittsburgh Steelers, Gonzalez recorded his first career extra point and field goal, a 24-yard attempt. On October 22, 2017, in a Week 7 12–9 loss to the Tennessee Titans, he scored all nine points on three field goals, including a career-long of 54 yards. Overall, in the 2017 season, he converted 25 of 26 extra point attempts and 15 of 20 field goal attempts.

==== 2018 season ====
In Week 1, in the 21–21 tie against the Steelers, Gonzalez had a game-winning 43-yard attempt blocked in overtime that would have given the Browns the win. On September 16, in a Week 2 21–18 loss to the New Orleans Saints, Gonzalez missed two field goals and two extra points, including a PAT that would have given the Browns a 19–18 lead. He concluded the game by missing a 52-yard field goal with 3 seconds left, sealing the loss. He was waived by the Browns the following day, September 17.

=== Arizona Cardinals ===
On November 20, 2018, Gonzalez was signed to the practice squad of the Arizona Cardinals. He was promoted to the active roster on November 26, 2018, following an injury to Phil Dawson.

On December 2, 2018, in a Week 13 20–17 win against the Green Bay Packers, Gonzalez recorded two field goals and extra points which included the 44-yard go-ahead field goal that eventually gave the Cardinals the win. In the 2018 season, he converted nine of 14 field goal attempts and eight of 11 extra point attempts.

In the 2019 season, Gonzalez converted 31 of 35 field goal attempts and 34 of 35 extra point attempts.

Gonzalez re-signed with the Cardinals on April 23, 2020. He was placed on injured reserve on December 19, 2020. He finished the 2020 season converting 16 of 22 field goal attempts and 38 of 39 extra point attempts. Gonzalez was released on March 5, 2021.

=== Detroit Lions ===
Gonzalez signed with the Detroit Lions on August 10, 2021. He was waived on August 31, and re-signed to the practice squad the next day.

=== Carolina Panthers ===
On September 14, 2021, Gonzalez was signed by the Carolina Panthers off the Lions practice squad. In Week 8, Gonzalez converted all four of his field goal attempts and accounted for 13 points in the Panthers 19–13 win over the Atlanta Falcons, earning National Football Conference (NFC) Special Teams Player of the Week. In Week 10, Gonzalez had another perfect game, converting all four field goals in a 34–10 win over the Cardinals, earning another NFC Special Teams Player of the Week honor. In Week 15's matchup against the Buffalo Bills, Gonzalez suffered a quad injury in warm-ups, and had to be placed on injured reserve after the game, ending his season. He finished the 2021 season converting 20 of 22 field goal attempts and 22 of 23 extra point attempts.

On March 9, 2022, Gonzalez signed a one-year contract extension with the Panthers. On August 30, 2022, Gonzalez was placed on injured reserve after injuring his quad during the last preseason game while warming up and missed the entire season.

=== San Francisco 49ers ===
On March 24, 2023, the Panthers traded Gonzalez to the San Francisco 49ers in exchange for a conditional swap of late-round picks in the 2025 NFL draft. He was placed on injured reserve on August 29. Gonzalez was released from injured reserve with an injury settlement on September 5.

=== Washington Commanders ===
Gonzalez signed with the Washington Commanders' practice squad on November 8, 2024. He was elevated from the practice squad three times before signing to the active roster after Austin Seibert had been placed on injured reserve. In six regular season games in 2024 with the Commanders, Gonzalez made 5 of 7 field goals and 19 of 19 extra points. In his first-ever playoff appearance, on January 12, 2025, against the Tampa Bay Buccaneers, with three seconds remaining in the game, Gonzalez kicked a dramatic, game-winning 37-yard field goal that bounced off the upright before going in. It was Washington's first playoff win since 2005. Gonzalez made 3-of-3 field goals in the game, including a 22-yard kick and a 52-yard kick, his longest of the year.

Gonzalez signed a one-year extension with the Commanders on March 6, 2025. However, he was released following the signing of Matt Gay on April 29.

=== Atlanta Falcons ===
On November 5, 2025, Gonzalez signed with the Atlanta Falcons. In Week 12, he converted all three field goals and an extra point in a 24–10 win over the New Orleans Saints, earning NFC Special Teams Player of the Week. In Week 18, he converted all four field goal attempts in a 19–17 win again over the Saints, earning his second Player of the Week honor of the season. He finished the 2025 season converting 19 of 22 field goal attempts and 17 of 18 extra point attempts.

=== Miami Dolphins ===
On March 12, 2026, Gonzalez signed a one-year contract with the Miami Dolphins. He was placed on injured reserve on August 10 due to an undisclosed injury. Gonzalez was released by Miami with an injury settlement on August 19. He was re-signed to the practice squad on October 20 following the release of Riley Patterson. Gonzalez was elevated to the active roster in Week 7 before a matchup against the New York Jets. After elevated for games against the New England Patriots and Detroit Lions, he was signed to the active roster on November 14. Against the Indianapolis Colts, Gonzalez missed two field goals and an extra point which resulted in the 24–22 loss. On November 16, 2026, the Dolphins announced his release from the team.

== Personal life ==
Gonzalez goes by the name Zane as a result of his father, Joseph, discovering the name in the movie Maverick, where James Garner's character was named Zane. He has been open about his struggle with obsessive–compulsive disorder. He married Lizzy Mireya Martinez in 2024 and they had their first child on December 18, 2024.

Gonzalez is of Mexican descent.
