= Jeff Van Raaphorst =

American football player (born 1963)

No. 10
- Position: Quarterback

Personal information
- Born: December 7, 1963 (age 62); Columbus, Ohio, U.S.
- Listed height: 6 ft 1 in (1.85 m)
- Listed weight: 210 lb (95 kg)

Career information
- High school: Grossmont (El Cajon, California)
- College: Arizona State
- NFL draft: 1987: undrafted

Career history
- Denver Broncos (1987)*; Atlanta Falcons (1987)
- * Offseason or practice squad member only

Career NFL statistics
- Passing attempts: 34
- Passing completions: 18
- Completion percentage: 52.9%
- TD–INT: 1–2
- Passing yards: 174
- Passer rating: 52.8
- Stats at Pro Football Reference

Jeffrey Richard Van Raaphorst (born December 7, 1963) is an American former professional football player who was a quarterback for the Atlanta Falcons on the National Football League (NFL). He played college football for the Arizona State Sun Devils.

Van Raaphorst attended Grossmont High School in El Cajon, California, where he played defensive end and tight end before he was converted to a quarterback by his head coach. As a senior, he threw for 2,970 yards. Van Raaphorst committed to playing college football at Arizona State University over Miami and Florida. He led the Sun Devils to the Pac-10 championship in his senior year, where they won the 1987 Rose Bowl. He was the Rose Bowl Player of the Game after passing for 193 yards and two touchdowns.

After going unselected in the 1987 NFL draft, Van Raaphorst signed with the Denver Broncos as an undrafted free agent because "they [didn't] have a third quarterback". However, he was waived by the team during final cuts in September. Later that month, Van Raaphorst signed with the Atlanta Falcons as a replacement player during the 1987 NFL strike. He played two games for Atlanta in the 1987 season.

Van Raaphorst was inducted into the Rose Bowl Hall of Fame in 2006. He now serves as a color commentator for Arizona State football radio broadcasts.

== Personal life ==
Van Raaphorst comes from an athletic family. His father, Dick, was a kicker in the NFL. One of his brothers, Mike, was a backup quarterback behind Carson Palmer at USC in 1999, while another brother, Billy, is a college baseball umpire. Lastly, Van Raaphorst's son, Cade, plays professional lacrosse for the Atlas Lacrosse Club of the Professional Lacrosse League.
