= Shaun McDonald (American football) =

American football player (born 1981)

No. 84, 81
- Position: Wide receiver

Personal information
- Born: June 13, 1981 (age 45); Phoenix, Arizona, U.S.
- Listed height: 5 ft 10 in (1.78 m)
- Listed weight: 183 lb (83 kg)

Career information
- High school: Shadow Mountain (Phoenix)
- College: Arizona State
- NFL draft: 2003: 4th round, 106th overall pick

Career history
- St. Louis Rams (2003–2006); Detroit Lions (2007–2008); Pittsburgh Steelers (2009)

Awards and highlights
- Third-team All-American (2002); 2× First-team All-Pac-10 (2001, 2002)

Career NFL statistics
- Receptions: 220
- Receiving yards: 2,490
- Receiving touchdowns: 11
- Stats at Pro Football Reference

Shaun Terrance McDonald (born June 30, 1981) is an American former professional football player who was a wide receiver in the National Football League (NFL). He played college football for the Arizona State Sun Devils and was selected by the St. Louis Rams in the fourth round of the 2003 NFL draft.

McDonald also played for the Detroit Lions and Pittsburgh Steelers.

== Early life ==
McDonald is a 1999 graduate of Shadow Mountain High School in Phoenix and was a 1999 Honorable Mention All-America by USA Today. He also earned All-state honors as a kick return specialist and all-conference as a wide receiver and kick specialist as a junior. He was a three-year starter and had five kickoff returns for touchdowns as a senior before missing one-third of his senior season with a broken fibula. As a senior, he had 800 yards receiving (30 yard average), 1,700 all-purpose yards, added seven kick returns for touchdown, and averaged 46 yards per kick return. As a junior, he returned four kickoffs of 90 yards or longer for touchdowns. He still holds the state record for most kickoff returns for touchdowns with 14. He lettered three times in football and four times each in soccer and track and field. McDonald also scored a goal and assisted on another in winning the state championship in soccer.

== College career ==
McDonald played college football at Arizona State University, winding up as one of the most prolific pass catchers in Sun Devils' history. He came to Arizona State in 2000 after a standout prep career in Phoenix. McDonald broke out in 2001 after a quiet freshman season, catching 47 passes for 1,104 yards and 10 touchdowns, earning him All Pac-10 honors.

McDonald followed up his impressive 2001 with an even better 2002, when he caught 87 passes for 1,405 yards and 13 touchdowns. McDonald ranked 6th nationally in receiving yards in 2002 and he was tied for third nationally in receiving touchdowns.

McDonald was a Biletnikoff Award (outstanding receiver) finalist in 2002 and a third-team All-American selection in his junior season. He currently holds Sun Devil single-season records in receptions and receiving yards. McDonald declared for the NFL Draft after his junior season.

Year	Team	GP	Receiving				Rushing				Scrimmage			
Year	Team	GP	Rec	Yds	Avg	TD	Att	Yds	Avg	TD	Plays	Yds	Avg	TD
2000	Arizona State	12	22	358	16.3	1	5	30	6.0	0	27	388	14.4	1
2001	Arizona State	11	47	1,104	23.5	10	4	8	2.0	1	51	1,112	21.8	11
2002	Arizona State	14	87	1,405	16.1	13	5	25	5.0	0	92	1,430	15.5	13
Career		37	156	2,867	18.4	24	14	63	4.5	1	170	2,930	17.2	25

== Professional career ==
=== Pre-draft ===
Pre-draft measurables
Height	Weight	Arm length	Hand span
5 ft 8 1/2 in (1.74 m)	169 lb (77 kg)	29 1/2 in (0.75 m)	8 3/4 in (0.22 m)
All values from Pro Day

McDonald measured 5'9" and 174 pounds and ran a 4.34 40-yard dash at his ASU pro day.

=== St Louis Rams ===
The St Louis Rams made McDonald the 106th pick in the 2003 NFL Draft. At the end of the 2006 season, McDonald finished his career with the Rams with 106 catches for 1,215 yards and four touchdowns.

=== Detroit Lions ===
In the 2007 offseason, McDonald left the Rams and joined former Rams offensive coordinator Mike Martz with the Detroit Lions. That season, McDonald led the Lions in catches with 79, 943 yards, and touchdowns with six.

In 2008, McDonald started seven of the 12 games in which he played and caught 35 passes for 332 yards and a touchdown.

=== Pittsburgh Steelers ===
McDonald was signed by the Pittsburgh Steelers on May 1, 2009.

=== NFL statistics ===
Year	Team	Games		Receiving						Rushing					Fumbles	
Year	Team	G	GS	Tgt	Rec	Yds	Avg	TD	Lng	Att	Yds	Avg	Lng	TD	Fum	Lost
2003	STL	8	1	21	10	62	6.2	0	13	2	7	3.5	5	0	1	0
2004	STL	16	0	68	37	494	13.4	3	52	4	0	0	7	0	4	2
2005	STL	16	2	74	46	523	11.4	0	28	1	7	7.0	7	0	1	1
2006	STL	16	0	19	13	136	10.5	1	28	–	–	–	–	–	2	1
2007	DET	16	7	127	79	943	11.9	6	49	4	2	0.5	9	0	3	2
2008	DET	12	7	67	35	332	9.5	1	26	–	–	–	–	–	2	1
2009	PIT	4	0	–	–	–	–	–	–	–	–	–	–	–	–	–
Career		88	17	376	220	2,490	11.3	11	52	11	16	1.5	9	0	13	7

== Personal life ==
McDonald has two cousins in professional sports - former NBA point guard Mike Bibby and professional soccer player Robbie Findley. He is also related through marriage to Eddie House who most recently played for the Miami Heat.
