= Cameron Marshall =

American gridiron football player (born 1991)

No. 43
- Position: Running back

Personal information
- Born: October 14, 1991 (age 35); San Jose, California, U.S.
- Listed height: 5 ft 9 in (1.75 m)
- Listed weight: 217 lb (98 kg)

Career information
- High school: San Jose (CA) Valley Christian
- College: Arizona State
- NFL draft: 2013: undrafted

Career history
- Miami Dolphins (2013–2014)*; Winnipeg Blue Bombers (2014–2015); Seattle Seahawks (2016)*; Jacksonville Jaguars (2016)*; Saskatchewan Roughriders (2017–2018); Hamilton Tiger-Cats (2019)
- * Offseason or practice squad member only
- Stats at Pro Football Reference
- Stats at CFL.ca

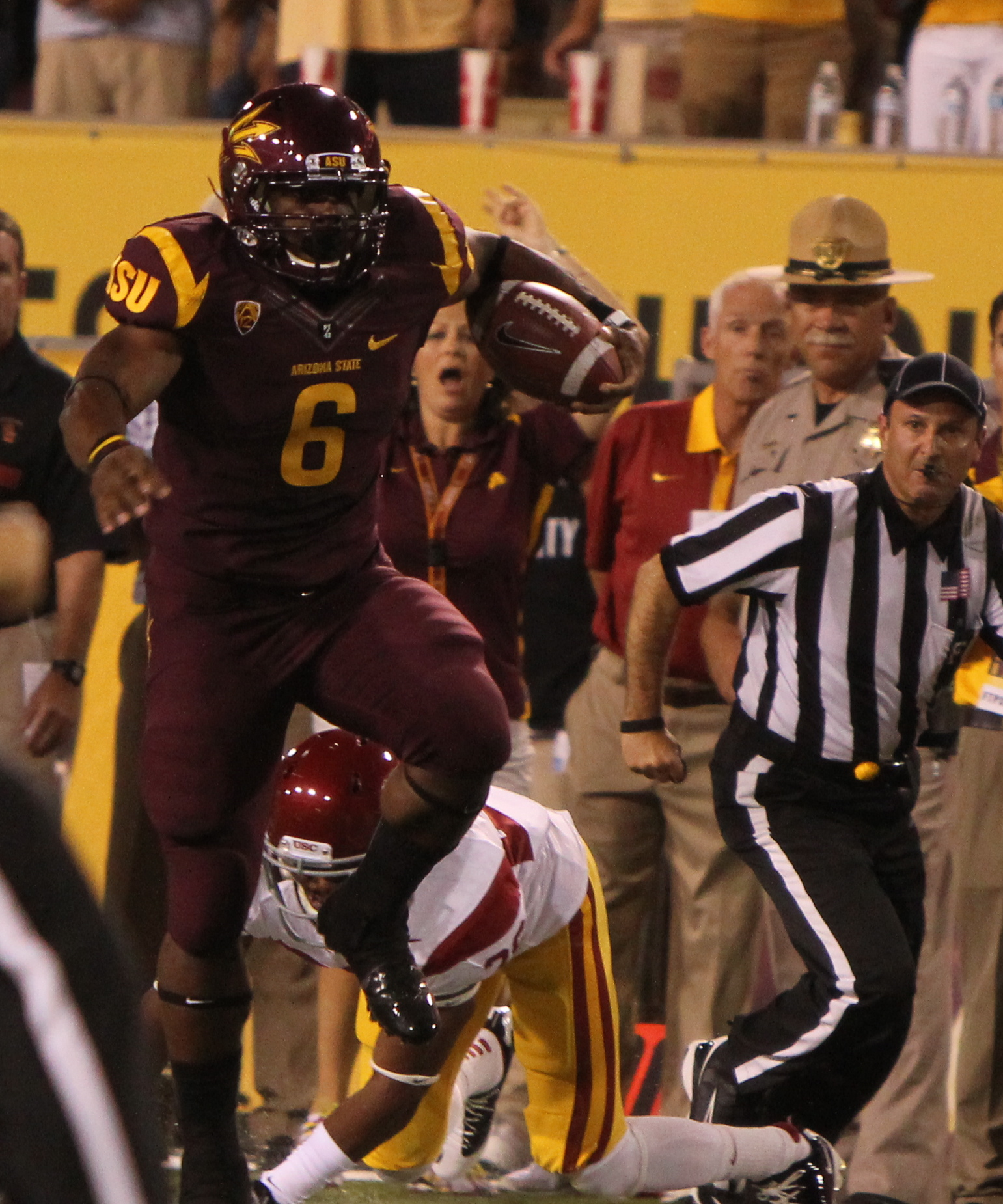
Cameron Marshall, 2011.

Cameron Marshall (born October 14, 1991) is an American former professional football running back. He played college football at Arizona State. Marshall has also spent time with the Miami Dolphins, Winnipeg Blue Bombers, Seattle Seahawks, Jacksonville Jaguars, Saskatchewan Roughriders, and Hamilton Tiger-Cats.

== Early life ==
Cameron Marshall was born to Greg and Tammie Marshall and has an older sister, Dahlys, and younger brother, Byron. Marshall attended Valley Christian High School in San Jose, California where he graduated in 2009.

== College career ==
Marshall verbally committed to the Arizona State on January 27, 2009. Marshall played all four years with the Sun Devils, playing in 49 games over that span. Marshall scored 38 rushing touchdowns, amassed 2,700 rushing yards with an average of 4.7 yards per carry.

== Professional career ==
=== Miami Dolphins ===
On April 27, 2013, after going undrafted, Marshall announced on Twitter he would sign with the Miami Dolphins. On August 8, 2013, Marshall was waived due to a lingering hamstring injury from the month prior. The following day, August 9, he reverted to the Dolphins' injured reserve list. On August 14, 2013, Marshall was released with an injury settlement by the Dolphins. On November 26, 2013, Marshall was re-signed to the Dolphins' practice squad. On December 31, 2013, Marshall was signed to a futures contract with the Dolphins. On May 28, 2014, Marshall was waived from the roster to make room for Anthony Gaitor. On August 11, 2014, Marshall was signed by the Dolphins before being released a week later on the 18th.

=== Winnipeg Blue Bombers ===
On October 21, 2014, Marshall was signed by the Winnipeg Blue Bombers of the Canadian Football League (CFL). In two seasons Marshall played in 19 games for the Blue Bombers totaling 1,007 yards and 7 touchdowns on 175 touches.

=== Seattle Seahawks ===
On February 11, 2016, Marshall was signed by the Seattle Seahawks. On May 4, 2016, the Seahawks waived Marshall.

=== Jacksonville Jaguars ===
On August 23, 2016, Marshall was signed by the Jacksonville Jaguars. On August 29, 2016, he was waived by the Jaguars.

=== Saskatchewan Roughriders ===
On February 16, 2017, Marshall was signed by the Saskatchewan Roughriders of the Canadian Football League (CFL). In his first season with the club Marshall carried the ball 101 times for 543 yards with two touchdowns. He also caught 30 passes for 280 yards and another two touchdowns. On May 10, 2018 the Riders announced they had released Marshall. Marshall was re-signed by the Riders on August 14, 2018. Marshall played only three games for the Riders in 2018, rushing 34 times for 220 yards. He was not re-signed by the team following the season and became a free agent on February 12, 2019.

=== Hamilton Tiger-Cats ===
On February 27, 2019 Marshall agreed to a contract with the Hamilton Tiger-Cats (CFL).
