= Taylor Kelly =

American football player and coach (born 1991)

No. 10
- Position: Quarterback

Personal information
- Born: March 30, 1991 (age 35); Eagle, Idaho, U.S.
- Listed height: 6 ft 1 in (1.85 m)
- Listed weight: 202 lb (92 kg)

Career information
- High school: Eagle
- College: Arizona State (2010–2014)
- NFL draft: 2015: undrafted

Career history
- Arizona State (2015) Graduate assistant; Mater Dei High School Quarterbacks coach (2016-present)

Awards and highlights
- Second-team All-Pac-12 (2013)

Taylor Kelly (born March 30, 1991) is an American football coach and former quarterback. He currently serves as the quarterbacks coach for Mater Dei High School. He played college football for the Arizona State Sun Devils.

== Early life ==
Born and raised in Eagle, Idaho, near Boise, Kelly graduated from Eagle High School in 2010. Regarded as the top senior football player in the state of Idaho by Scout.com, he was the only player from Idaho to sign an FBS letter of intent to attend a BCS conference university in 2010. He completed 119-of-192 passes (62.0-percent) for 1,800 yards and 18 touchdowns as a junior in 2008 despite missing time due to an injury, and also carried 77 times for 423 yards (5.5 avg.) with five touchdowns that year. As a senior, he led Eagle High School to an 11–1 record in 2009 and the Class 5A State Championship, completing 182-of-265 passes (68.7 percent) for 2,509 yards and 22 touchdowns in addition to 1,005 rushing yards on 156 carries (6.1 avg.) with 10 more scores. He threw for over 200 yards four times and rushed for over 100 yards in four games, and also added 35 tackles (29 solo) with 11 pass deflections, one fumble recovery and one blocked field goal. In the state championship game, he passed for 161 yards and a touchdown and had 103 rushing yards and two scores.

Kelly also lettered in track & field at Eagle High School. In 2010, he recorded personal-bests of 11.74 seconds (non-FAT) in the 100-meter dash and 5.79 meters (or 19 ft) in the long jump at the JV Meet Boise, placing fourth and second, respectively.

He was listed as the top quarterback and No. 2 overall recruit in the state of Idaho by Rivals.com. He was rated the No. 84 quarterback prospect in the country by Scout.com. He was also ranked as the top quarterback and the No. 4 overall prospect in Rocky Mountain States Postseason Top-10 by Rivals.com. He verbally committed to the Sun Devils on January 16, 2010.

== College career ==
Kelly did not appear in any games in 2010 and redshirted. In 2011, he was the backup to Brock Osweiler and attempted four passes during the season, completing all of them for 31 yards. Kelly became the starter in 2012 as a redshirt sophomore, and finished the season 241 of 359 for 3,039 yards, 29 touchdowns and nine interceptions. In 2013, he finished the season with 3,635 yards, 28 passing touchdowns, and 12 interceptions. As a senior in 2014, Kelly played in 10 games, missing three due to injury. He finished the year passing for 2,114 yards, 22 touchdowns and five interceptions.

=== Statistics ===
| Year | Team | Games | | | Passing | | | | | | | | Rushing | | | |
| Year | Team | GP | GS | Record | Cmp | Att | Pct | Yds | Avg | TD | INT | Rtg | Att | Yds | Avg | TD |
|---|---|---|---|---|---|---|---|---|---|---|---|---|---|---|---|---|
| 2010 | Arizona State | Redshirt | | | | | | | | | | | | | | |
| 2011 | Arizona State | 2 | 0 | — | 4 | 4 | 100.0 | 31 | 7.8 | 0 | 0 | 165.1 | 1 | 24 | 24.0 | 0 |
| 2012 | Arizona State | 13 | 13 | 8–5 | 241 | 359 | 67.1 | 3,039 | 8.5 | 29 | 9 | 159.9 | 134 | 516 | 3.9 | 1 |
| 2013 | Arizona State | 14 | 14 | 10–4 | 302 | 484 | 62.4 | 3,635 | 7.5 | 28 | 12 | 139.6 | 173 | 608 | 3.5 | 9 |
| 2014 | Arizona State | 10 | 10 | 8–2 | 165 | 278 | 59.4 | 2,114 | 7.6 | 22 | 5 | 145.7 | 95 | 256 | 2.7 | 3 |
| Career | | 39 | 37 | 26–11 | 712 | 1,125 | 63.3 | 8,819 | 7.8 | 79 | 26 | 147.7 | 403 | 1,404 | 3.5 | 13 |

== Professional career ==
Pre-draft measurables
| Height | Weight | Arm length | Hand span | Wingspan | 40-yard dash | 10-yard split | 20-yard split | 20-yard shuttle | Three-cone drill | Vertical jump | Broad jump |
|---|---|---|---|---|---|---|---|---|---|---|---|
| 6 ft 1 1/2 in (1.87 m) | 202 lb (92 kg) | 31 1/4 in (0.79 m) | 9 3/4 in (0.25 m) | 6 ft 5 in (1.96 m) | 4.58 s | 1.59 s | 2.63 s | 4.16 s | 6.80 s | 31.0 in (0.79 m) | 10 ft 2 in (3.10 m) |
All values from Pro Day

Following his time at Arizona State, Kelly was summarized by NFL scouts as an "average size and average talent." Kelly was not selected in the 2015 NFL draft, nor was he signed by any NFL team. He was invited and attended only one workout with the Arizona Cardinals, who opted to sign Phillip Sims over Kelly. Kelly served as a graduate assistant on the 2015 Arizona State Sun Devils football team. After the season, he moved to Huntington Beach, California and joined the staff at Edge Quarterback Training. He is the quarterbacks coach at Mater Dei High School.
