= 2010 Arizona State Sun Devils football team =

American college football season

2010 Arizona State Sun Devils football
- Conference: Pacific-10 Conference
- Record: 6–6 (4–5 Pac-10)
- Head coach: Dennis Erickson (4th season)
- Offensive coordinator: Noel Mazzone (1st season)
- Offensive scheme: Spread
- Defensive coordinator: Craig Bray (4th season)
- Base defense: 4–3
- Captains: Omar Bolden; Jon Hargis; Gerald Munns; Steven Threet; Thomas Weber
- Home stadium: Sun Devil Stadium

Uniform

2010 Pacific-10 Conference football standings
	Conf.			Overall
Team	W		L	W		L
No. 3 Oregon $	9	–	0	12	–	1
No. 4 Stanford %	8	–	1	12	–	1
USC †	5	–	4	8	–	5
Washington	5	–	4	7	–	6
Arizona	4	–	5	7	–	6
Arizona State	4	–	5	6	–	6
Oregon State	4	–	5	5	–	7
California	3	–	6	5	–	7
UCLA	2	–	7	4	–	8
Washington State	1	–	8	2	–	10
$ – BCS representative as conference champion; % – BCS at-large representative; † – USC ineligible for championship and post-season due to NCAA sanctions; Rankings from AP Poll

The 2010 Arizona State Sun Devils football team represented Arizona State University in the 2010 NCAA Division I FBS football season. The Sun Devils were led by head coach Dennis Erickson in his 4th season. They played their home games at Sun Devil Stadium and are members of the Pacific-10 Conference. They finished the season 6–6, 4–5 in Pac-10 play. Despite a .500 record, the Sun Devils were not bowl eligible due to two wins over teams from the FCS.

== Schedule ==
Date	Time	Opponent	Site	TV	Result	Attendance
September 4	7:00 pm	Portland State*	Sun Devil Stadium; Tempe, AZ	FSAZ	W 54–9	43,238
September 11	7:00 pm	Northern Arizona*	Sun Devil Stadium; Tempe, AZ	FSAZ+	W 41–20	49,043
September 18	12:30 pm	at No. 11 Wisconsin*	Camp Randall Stadium; Madison, WI	ABC/ESPN2	L 19–20	81,332
September 25	7:30 pm	No. 5 Oregon	Sun Devil Stadium; Tempe, AZ	FSN	L 31–42	60,326
October 2	3:30 pm	at Oregon State	Reser Stadium; Corvallis, OR	FSAZ	L 28–31	45,409
October 9	7:00 pm	at Washington	Husky Stadium; Seattle, WA	FSAZ	W 24–14	65,685
October 23	12:30 pm	at California	California Memorial Stadium; Berkeley, CA	FSN	L 17–50	51,599
October 30	4:00 pm	Washington State^{†}	Sun Devil Stadium; Tempe, AZ		W 42–0	44,903
November 6	7:30 pm	at USC	Los Angeles Memorial Coliseum; Los Angeles, CA	FSN	L 33–34	68,744
November 13	4:30 pm	No. 7 Stanford	Sun Devil Stadium; Tempe, AZ	FSAZ	L 13–17	45,592
November 26	12:30 pm	UCLA	Sun Devil Stadium; Tempe, AZ	FSN	W 55–34	44,555
December 2	5:00 pm	at Arizona	Arizona Stadium; Tucson, AZ (84th Territorial Cup)	ESPN	W 30–29 ^{2OT}	56,253
*Non-conference game; ^{†}Homecoming; Rankings from AP Poll released prior to the game; All times are in Mountain time

== Game summaries ==
=== Northern Arizona ===
	1	2	3	4	Total
Lumberjacks	3	7	10	0	20
Sun Devils	7	10	10	14	41

=== Portland State ===
	1	2	3	4	Total
Vikings	3	3	3	0	9
Sun Devils	16	14	14	10	54

=== Wisconsin ===
	1	2	3	4	Total
Sun Devils	7	3	3	6	19
#11 Badgers	3	10	7	0	20

=== Oregon ===
	1	2	3	4	Total
#5 Ducks	14	14	14	0	42
Sun Devils	7	17	7	0	31

On September 25, 2010, Oregon defeated Arizona State in Tempe, Arizona by a score of 42-31. Though a night game, kickoff temperatures for the game soared at 100 degrees Fahrenheit. Arizona State took an early lead in the game, but Oregon responded with a season-high 4 team interceptions. The Sun Devils held primary running back LaMichael James to only 114 rushing yards, but the total was enough to move James past the 2,000 yard mark for his career. Oregon quarterback Darren Thomas had 290 passing yards in the game, including a 61-yard pass to tight end David Paulson, which were career longs for both players. The win was sufficiently impressive to Associated Press voters to move the Ducks from 5th to 4th (past TCU) in the September 27th AP Poll.

=== Oregon State ===
	1	2	3	4	Total
Sun Devils	7	7	3	11	28
Beavers	10	14	0	7	31

=== Washington ===
	1	2	3	4	Total
Sun Devils	14	7	0	3	24
Huskies	7	0	0	7	14

=== California ===
	1	2	3	4	Total
Sun Devils	3	0	7	7	17
Golden Bears	10	16	14	10	50

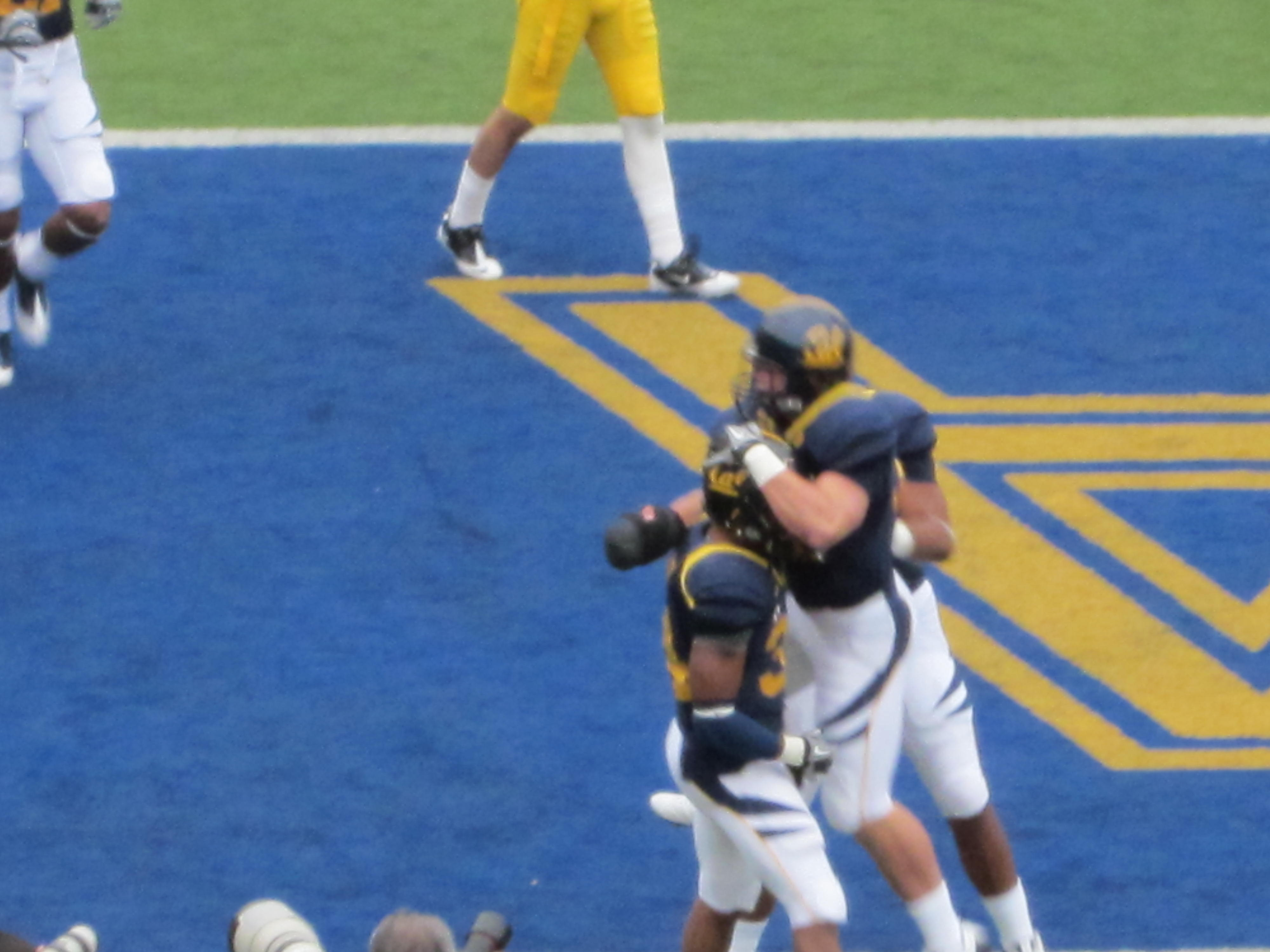
Cal running back Shane Vereen scores the game's opening touchdown

California faced Arizona State, who was coming off a bye week and looking for their first win in Berkeley since 1997. Although Sun Devils quarterback Steven Threet completed passes of 44 and 26 yards on the opening possession, Arizona State had to settle for a field goal, after which Cal took control of the game. The Bears responded with a drive that also resulted in a field goal, then intercepted Threet deep in Cal territory, but couldn't capitalize on the turnover. After forcing a three and out, Cal took advantage of a 28-yard punt return by wide receiver Jeremy Ross that gave them great field possession on the Arizona State 28-yard line. The Bears took advantage of two Sun Devils penalties with Shane Vereen scoring the game's first touchdown on an 8-yard run. Cal scored again to open the second quarter on a 4-yard pass from Kevin Riley to wide receiver Keenan Allen, with the PAT being blocked. Riley then connected with wide receiver Marvin Jones for a 52-yard score. A 37-yard field goal attempt by Arizona State missed, while Cal made one from 23 yards to put the Bears up 26 to 3 at the half.

Third-string quarterback Samson Szakacsy stepped in for an injured Threet, after Brock Osweiler refused to go in to avoid disqualifying his redshirt year. The Bears scored to open the second half on a 5-yard run by Vereen. Two minutes later, the Bears blocked a Sun Devils punt, which was recovered by defensive back Chris Conte for a 7-yard score. Arizona State in turn was able to block a Cal punt for a 1-yard touchdown by linebacker Oliver Aron. Cal opened the fourth quarter with a field goal, then scored on a 19-yard run by wide receiver Jeremy Ross. The final score of the game came on a fumble by backup quarterback Brock Mansion which was recovered by linebacker Brandon Magee for a 26-yard score.

Kevin Riley threw for 240 yards and two scores, while Shane Vereen rushed for 91 yards, tying him for fifth place in career rushing touchdowns with Justin Forsett, while wide receiver Marvin Jones had 110 receiving yards and a score. Steven Threet threw for 130 yards with two interceptions and Szakacsy able to only manage 66. The Sun Devils were held to 51 rushing yards.

=== Washington State ===
	1	2	3	4	Total
Cougars	0	0	0	0	0
Sun Devils	14	14	7	7	42

=== USC ===
	1	2	3	4	Total
Sun Devils	7	0	14	12	33
Trojans	0	14	15	5	34

=== Stanford ===
	1	2	3	4	Total
Sun Devils	7	0	6	0	13
#7 Cardinal	7	0	3	7	17

=== UCLA ===
	1	2	3	4	Total
Bruins	17	3	7	7	34
Sun Devils	7	14	17	17	55

Arizona State quarterback Brock Osweiler threw 4 touchdown passes while UCLA quarterback Richard Brehaut had three. The victory ended UCLA's hope of a bowl game in December.

=== Arizona ===
	1	2	3	4	OT	2OT	Total
Sun Devils	3	3	0	14	3	7	30
Wildcats	0	0	14	6	3	6	29
