= 2011 Maaco Bowl Las Vegas =

- 20th Las Vegas Bowl
- 20th Anniversary logo
Arizona State Sun Devils	Boise State Broncos
(6–6)	(11–1)
Pac-12	Mountain West
24	56
Head coach: Dennis Erickson	Head coach: Chris Petersen
	AP / Coaches / BCS; 8 / 6 / 7
	1	2	3	4	Total
Arizona State	0	3	7	14	24
Boise State	14	14	7	21	56
- Date: December 22, 2011
- Season: 2011
- Stadium: Sam Boyd Stadium
- Location: Whitney, Nevada
- MVP: RB Doug Martin, Boise State
- Favorite: Boise State by 13
- Referee: David Epperley (ACC)
- Attendance: 35,720
- Payout: US$1 million per team

United States TV coverage
- Network: ESPN
- Announcers: Chris Fowler (play-by-play); Kirk Herbstreit (analyst); Tom Rinaldi (Sidelines)
- Nielsen ratings: 2.05

The 2011 Maaco Bowl Las Vegas, the 20th edition of the game, was a postseason American college football bowl game, held on December 22, 2011, at Sam Boyd Stadium in Whitney, Nevada, as part of the 2011–12 NCAA Bowl season.

The game, televised on ESPN, was between the Arizona State Sun Devils from the Pac-12 Conference and the Boise State Broncos from the Mountain West Conference.

== Teams ==
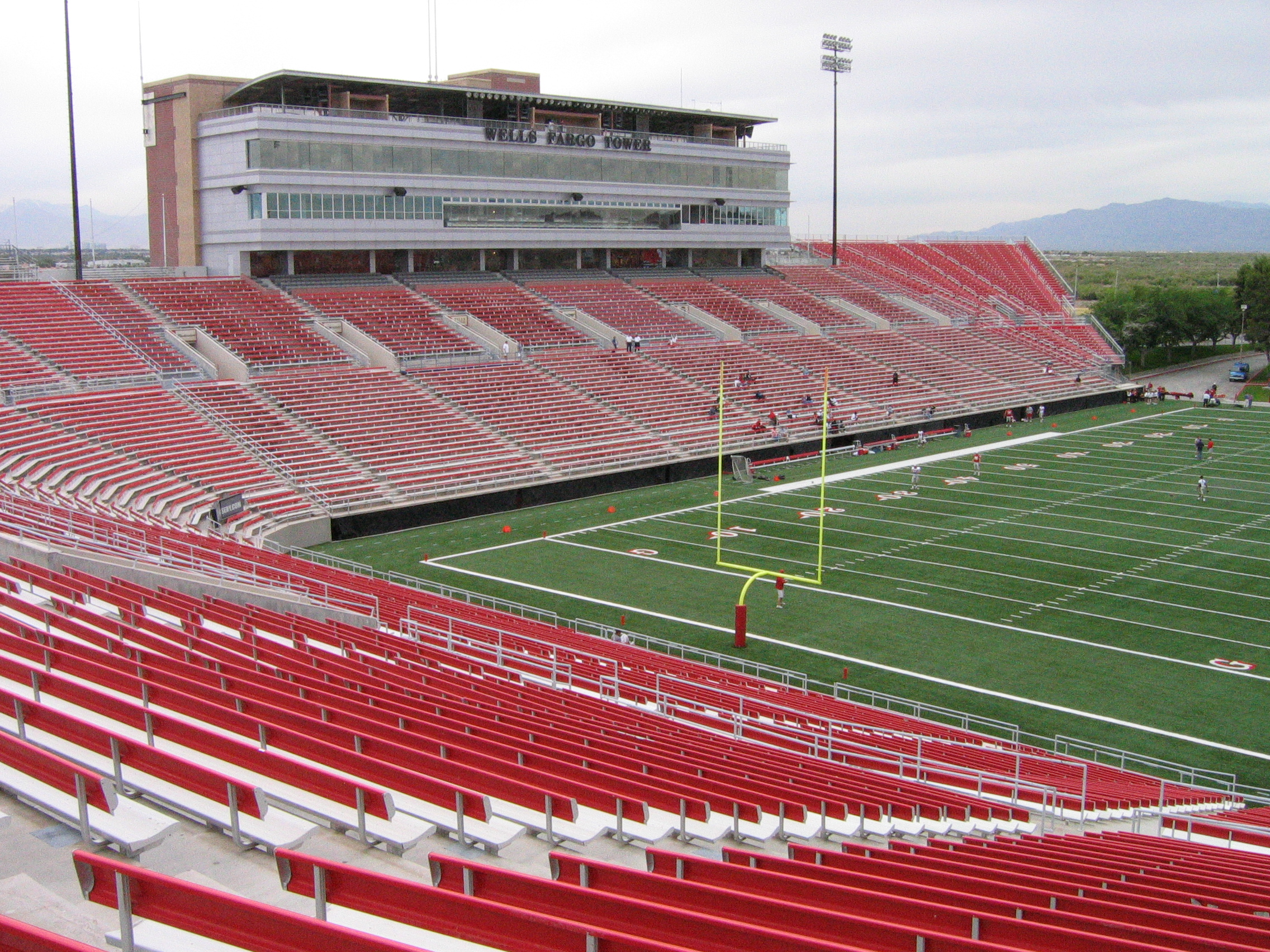
The 2011 Maaco Bowl Las Vegas was played at Sam Boyd Stadium.

Meeting for the second time in history, the Broncos and the Sun Devils had previously met with the then No. 5 Arizona State defeating Boise State 56–7 in Tempe, Arizona, on 5 October 1996. However, Boise State claims a three-game winning streak over Pac-12 teams, winning over Oregon twice and Oregon State in 2010 when all three teams were ranked.

=== Arizona State ===
On 4 December 2011, the Arizona State Sun Devils accepted an invitation to represent the Pac-12. The Sun Devils entered the bowl with a 6–6 record. On 28 November, their coach Dennis Erickson was fired after the Sun Devils had four consecutive losses following a 6–2 start. However, Erickson was allowed to coach the team at the Las Vegas Bowl. The 2011 Maaco Bowl Las Vegas was ASU's first post-season appearance since the 2007 Holiday Bowl.

=== Boise State ===
On 4 December 2011, the Boise State Broncos accepted an invitation to represent the MWC. The Broncos entered the bowl ranked #7 in the BCS standings with an 11–1 record, finishing second in the Mountain West Conference. The Broncos only loss in the season was against TCU, costing the team a chance at the BCS National Championship Game. The Broncos had appeared in the Las Vegas Bowl the previous year, winning 26–3 against Utah. The 2011 Maaco Bowl Las Vegas was the final college game for Kellen Moore, the most successful quarterback in FBS history.

== Game summary ==
Despite committing three turnovers, the Boise State Broncos easily routed the Arizona State Sun Devils 56–24.

The Broncos scored quickly when Doug Martin returned a kickoff 100 yards for a touchdown to make it 7–0 Broncos. Boise State went up 14–0 on a 14-yard touchdown pass to Tyler Shoemaker. The Broncos made it 21–0 in the 2nd quarter on a touchdown pass to wide receiver Matt Miller. The Sun Devils finally scored with a 32-yard Alex Garoutte field goal to cut the deficit to 21–3. Boise State responded with a pass from Matt Miller to Kyle Efaw on a trick play to make the score 28–3 going into the half.

Arizona State scored quickly to begin the 2nd half when Rashad Ross returned the kickoff 98 yards for a touchdown, making it 28–10. ASU attempted an onside kick but was recovered by BSU. On their next possession, the Broncos turned the ball over on a Kellen Moore interception, but Arizona State turned it back to the Broncos on downs. Broncos then again turned it over on a fumbled snap. The Sun Devils, taking advantage of the turnover, drove to the Broncos' 1-yard line. On a 4th down play, Brock Osweiler's pass was intercepted by Jamar Taylor, who returned it 100-yards for a touchdown to put the Broncos up 35–10.

In the 4th quarter, the Broncos scored 2 more touchdowns, including 1 fumble return touchdown, to make it 49–10. ASU finally got its first offensive touchdown of the game on a 21-yard pass from Osweiler to Gerell Robinson to make it 49–17. The two teams then traded touchdowns to end the game with a final score of 56–24.

A few records were set at the 2011 Maaco Bowl Las Vegas. The Boise State Broncos became the first FBS team to win 50 games in a 4-year period. The Broncos also set a bowl record in points scored at 56. ASU's Gerell Robinson had a bowl-record 241-yard receiving, while BSU's Doug Martin finished with 301 all-purpose yards, another Las Vegas Bowl record.

== Scoring summary ==
=== Statistics ===
Statistics	ASU	BSU
First downs	22	27
Rushes-yards (net)	21-11	35−162
Passing yards (net)	395	298
Passes, att-comp-int	47-30-1	36–27–2
Total offense, plays – yards	68-384	71–460
Time of possession	28:01	31:59

Scoring summary

Quarter	Time	Drive			Team	Scoring information	Score	
Quarter	Time	Plays	Yards	TOP	Team	Scoring information	ASU	BSU
1	14:46	1	100	0:14	BSU	Arizona St. kicked off, Doug Martin returned kickoff for 100 yards (Michael Frisina made PAT)	0	7
1	4:36	8	54	3:00	BSU	Kellen Moore passed to Tyler Shoemaker to the right for 14-yard gain (Michael Frisina made PAT)	0	14
2	12:03	8	80	3:29	BSU	Kellen Moore passed to Matt Miller to the left for 2-yard gain (Michael Frisina made PAT)	0	21
2	5:44	11	66	3:50	ASU	Alex Garoutte kicked a 32-yard field goal	3	21
2	0:43	12	72	5:01	BSU	Matt Miller passed to Kyle Efaw to the right for 5-yard gain (Michael Frisina made PAT)	3	28
3	14:45	1	98	0:15	ASU	Rashad Ross 98 Yd Kickoff Return (Alex Garoutte Kick)	10	28
3	6:52	7	49	3:37	BSU	Interception returned 100 yards for touchdown by Jamar Taylor, Michael Frisina kick good	10	35
4	14:55	10	80	4:32	BSU	D.J. Harper 4 Yd Run (Michael Frisina Kick)	10	42
4	14:17	2	6	0:38	BSU	Fumble recovery returned 26 yards for touchdown by Travis Stanaway, Michael Frisina kick good	10	49
4	13:05	3	54	1:12	ASU	Gerell Robinson 21 Yd Pass From Brock Osweiler (Alex Garoutte Kick)	17	49
4	2:24	11	74	6:21	BSU	Doug Martin 2 Yd Run (Michael Frisina Kick)	17	56
4	0:28	7	75	1:56	ASU	George Bell 30 Yd Pass From Brock Osweiler (Alex Garoutte Kick)	24	56
"TOP" = time of possession. For other American football terms, see Glossary of American football.							24	56
