= Gerell Robinson =

American football player (born 1989)

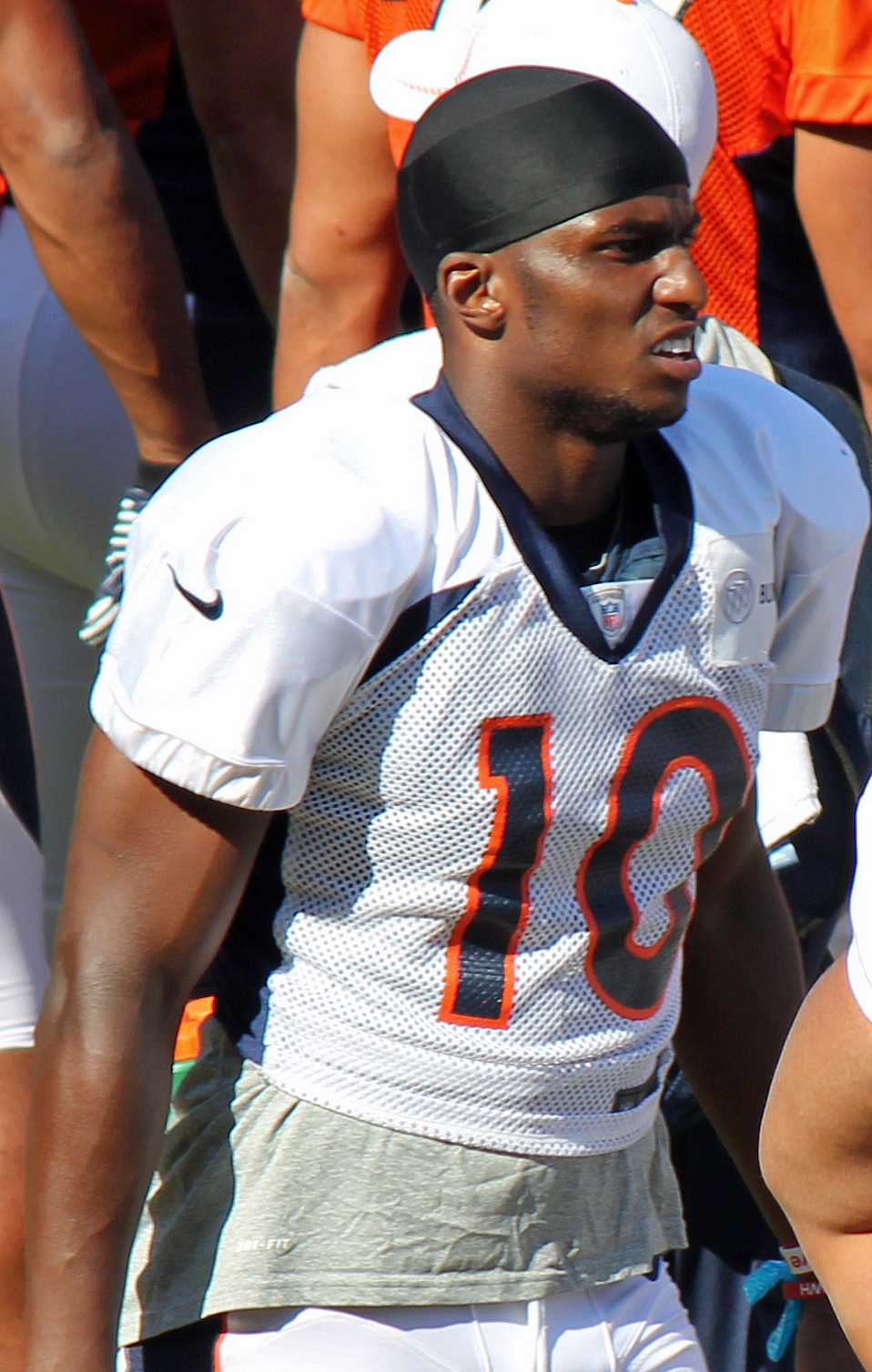
- Robinson at a scrimmage in August 2012

No. 10, 89, 85
- Positions: Tight end, wide receiver

Personal information
- Born: October 13, 1989 (age 37); Gary, Indiana, U.S.
- Listed height: 6 ft 3 in (1.91 m)
- Listed weight: 220 lb (100 kg)

Career information
- High school: Hamilton (Chandler, Arizona)
- College: Arizona State
- NFL draft: 2012: undrafted

Career history
- Denver Broncos (2012)*; Arizona Cardinals (2012)*; Denver Broncos (2013–2014)*; Cleveland Browns (2014); Miami Dolphins (2014)
- * Offseason or practice squad member only
- Stats at Pro Football Reference

La'Diviosia Gerell Robinson (born October 13, 1989), known as Gerell Robinson, is a former professional football tight end in the National Football League (NFL). He also played for Arizona State University and Hamilton High School mainly as a wide receiver.

== College career ==
Robinson was a heavily recruited player nationally, ultimately committing to Arizona State University on January 5, 2008, and signed a letter of intent on February 6, 2008. At ASU, he would play wide receiver across from high school teammate Kerry Taylor, who would also go into the NFL, under newly installed Dennis Erickson.

Arizona State University Statistics
Year	GS	G	Rec.	Yds.	Avg	TD	Lg	Avg/G
2008	0	11	3	26	8.7	0	13	2.4
2009	5	12	26	261	10.0	0	23	21.8
2010	7	11	29	387	13.3	5	39	35.2
2011	12	13	77	1,397	18.1	7	58	107.5
Career	25	47	135	2,071	15.3	12	58	44.1

During the 2008 and 2009 seasons, Robinson would receive limited action taking rolls on special teams. The 2009 season introduced Robinson into ASU's offense at wide receiver ending the season 4th overall in catches and yards. On special teams, his performance would increase with 2 tackles with 1 assist and forced fumble against Washington State University.

Missing the season opener in 2010 due to a hamstring injury preseason, Robinson returned to the active roster the next game. The most notable performance was against 5th ranked Oregon State University leading ASU with 7 catches for 84 yards.

His senior year was marked with career highs including a record-breaking MAACO Bowl Las Vegas with 13 catches for 241 yards against Boise State University in a 56–24 loss. By the end of the 2011 season, Robinson's 77 catches would place him 3rd highest single season for ASU and 2nd highest in single season yards of 1,397.

== Professional career ==
Pre-draft measurables
Height	Weight	Arm length	Hand span	40-yard dash	20-yard shuttle	Vertical jump	Broad jump	Wonderlic
6 ft 3 1/8 in (1.91 m)	227 lb (103 kg)	33 in (0.84 m)	10 1/8 in (0.26 m)	4.62 s	4.15 s	36 1/2 in (0.93 m)	9 ft 5 in (2.87 m)	28
All values from NFL Combine

=== Denver Broncos ===
Robinson signed with the Denver Broncos as an undrafted free agent following the 2012 NFL draft. Robinson failed to make the team's final roster cut, and was subsequently released by the organization. Shortly after, he was signed to the practice squad of the Arizona Cardinals. Robinson was then re-signed to the practice squad of the Denver Broncos.

=== Cleveland Browns ===
Robinson was signed by the Cleveland Browns on September 9, 2014. Robinson was waived by the Browns on October 18, and subsequently re-signed by the club three days later on October 21.

=== Miami Dolphins ===
In October 2014, Robinson was signed by the Miami Dolphins to their practice squad. On December 16, he was promoted to their active roster.
