= 2011 Arizona State Sun Devils football team =

American college football season

2011 Arizona State Sun Devils football

Maaco Bowl Las Vegas, L 24–56 vs. Boise State
- Conference: Pac-12 Conference
- South Division
- Record: 6–7 (4–5 Pac-12)
- Head coach: Dennis Erickson (5th season)
- Offensive coordinator: Noel Mazzone (2nd season)
- Offensive scheme: Spread
- Defensive coordinator: Craig Bray (5th season)
- Base defense: 4–3
- Captains: Omar Bolden; Garth Gerhart; Brock Osweiler; Colin Parker; T.J. Simpson
- Home stadium: Sun Devil Stadium

2011 Pac-12 Conference football standings
	Conf.			Overall
Team	W		L	W		L
North Division
No. 4 Oregon xy$	8	–	1	12	–	2
No. 7 Stanford x%	8	–	1	11	–	2
Washington	5	–	4	7	–	6
California	4	–	5	7	–	6
Oregon State	3	–	6	3	–	9
Washington State	2	–	7	4	–	8
South Division
No. 6 USC †	7	–	2	10	–	2
UCLA xy	5	–	4	6	–	8
Utah	4	–	5	8	–	5
Arizona State	4	–	5	6	–	7
Arizona	2	–	7	4	–	8
Colorado	2	–	7	3	–	10
Championship: Oregon 49, UCLA 31
$ – BCS representative as conference champion; % – BCS at-large representative; x – Division champion/co-champions; y – Championship game participant; † – USC ineligible for championship and postseason due to NCAA sanctions; Rankings from AP Poll

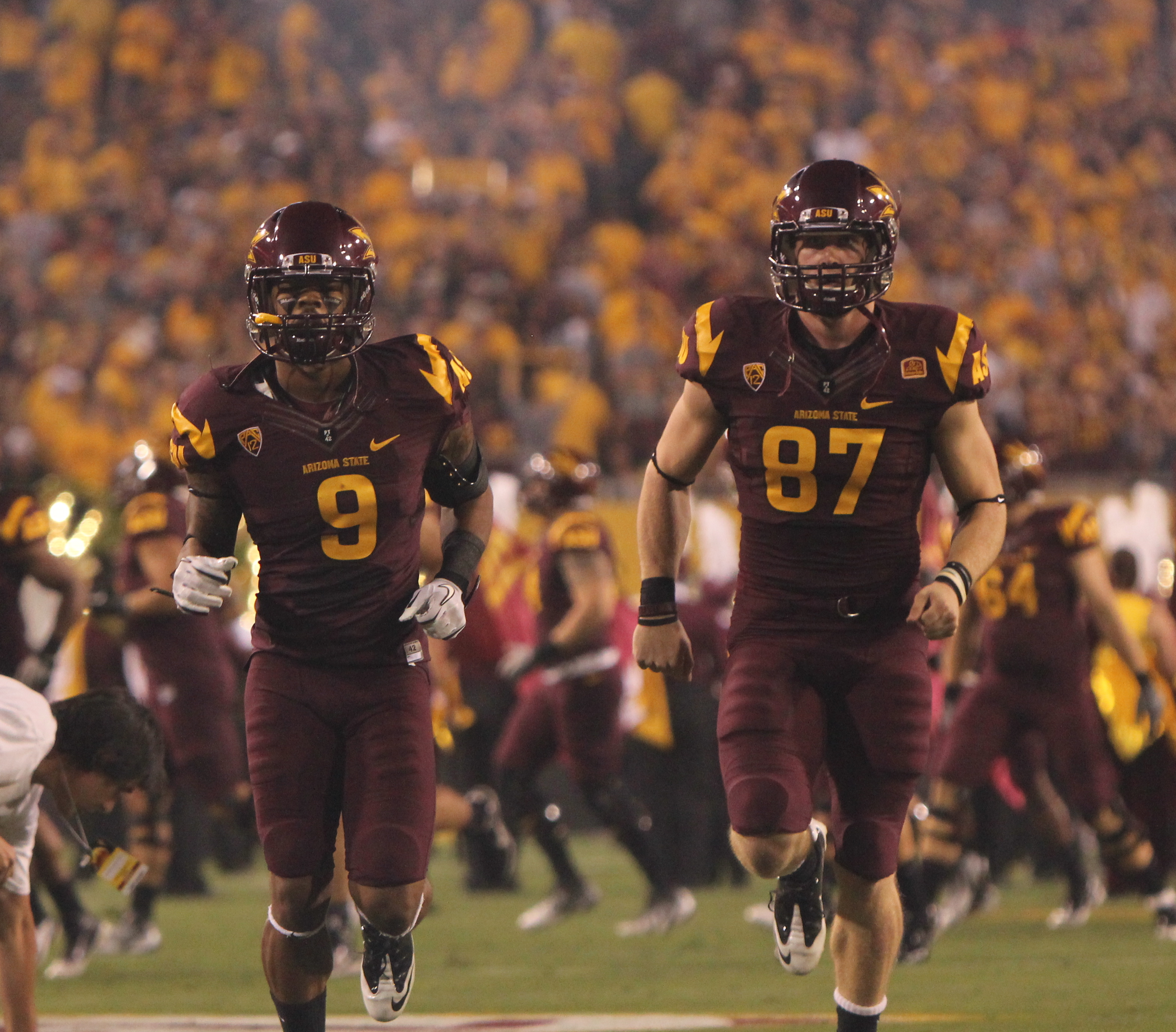
Arizona State players enter the stadium

The 2011 Sun Devils football team represented Arizona State University in the 2011 NCAA Division I FBS football season. The team was coached by fifth year head coach Dennis Erickson and played their home games in Sun Devil Stadium in Tempe, Arizona. They are a member of the South Division of the Pac-12 Conference. They finished the season 6–7, 4–5 in Pac-12 play to finish in a tie for third place in the South Division. They were invited to the Maaco Bowl Las Vegas where they were defeated by Boise State.

At the end of the regular season, head coach Dennis Erickson was fired. He stayed on to coach in the Sun Devils bowl game and finished with a five-year record of 31–31.

== Schedule ==
Date	Time	Opponent	Rank	Site	TV	Result	Attendance
September 1	7:00 pm	UC Davis*		Sun Devil Stadium; Tempe, AZ	FSAZ	W 48–14	45,671
September 9	7:30 pm	No. 21 Missouri*		Sun Devil Stadium; Tempe, AZ	ESPN	W 37–30 ^{OT}	70,236
September 17	4:00 pm	at Illinois*	No. 22	Memorial Stadium; Champaign, IL	BTN	L 14–17	50,669
September 24	7:15 pm	No. 23 USC		Sun Devil Stadium; Tempe, AZ	ESPN	W 43–22	61,495
October 1	7:30 pm	Oregon State	No. 25	Sun Devil Stadium; Tempe, AZ	FSAZ	W 35–20	57,437
October 8	12:30 pm	at Utah	No. 22	Rice-Eccles Stadium; Salt Lake City, UT	FSN	W 35–14	45,089
October 15	7:15 pm	at No. 9 Oregon	No. 18	Autzen Stadium; Eugene, OR (College GameDay)	ESPN	L 27–41	60,055
October 29	3:30 pm	Colorado^{†}	No. 23	Sun Devil Stadium; Tempe, AZ	FSAZ	W 48–14	53,168
November 5	4:30 pm	at UCLA	No. 20	Rose Bowl; Pasadena, CA	Versus	L 28–29	65,438
November 12	8:30 pm	at Washington State		Martin Stadium; Pullman, WA	Versus	L 27–37	27,213
November 19	7:30 pm	Arizona		Sun Devil Stadium; Tempe, AZ (Territorial Cup)	FSAZ	L 27–31	72,694
November 25	8:15 pm	California		Sun Devil Stadium; Tempe, AZ	ESPN	L 38–47	52,350
December 22	6:00 pm	vs. No. 8 Boise State*		Sam Boyd Stadium; Whitney, NV (Maaco Bowl Las Vegas)	ESPN	L 24–56	35,720
*Non-conference game; ^{†}Homecoming; Rankings from AP Poll released prior to the game; All times are in Mountain time

== Game summaries ==
=== UC Davis ===
	1	2	3	4	Total
Aggies	0	0	0	14	14
Sun Devils	14	10	17	7	48

The Sun Devils played the UC Davis Aggies on September 1 and won 48–14. Quarterback Brock Osweiler threw two touchdown passes – both of them to receiver Aaron Pflugrad – and finished with 19 completions on 26 attempts before leaving with leg cramps in the third quarter. Running back Cameron Marshall added two rushing touchdowns as the Sun Devils amassed 217 yards on the ground. ASU's defense managed to keep the Aggies scoreless until the fourth quarter; the Aggies scored both touchdowns against ASU's reserves.

Scoring summary

Quarter	Time	Drive			Team	Scoring information	Score	
Quarter	Time	Plays	Yards	TOP	Team	Scoring information	UC Davis	Arizona State
1	10:43	3	55	1:02	Arizona State	Cameron Marshall 2-yard touchdown run, Alex Garoutte kick good	0	7
1	3:40	4	15	1:09	Arizona State	Cameron Marshall 2-yard touchdown run, Alex Garoutte kick good	0	14
2	14:53	4	49	1:17	Arizona State	Aaron Pflugrad 31-yard touchdown reception from Brock Osweiler, Alex Garoutte kick good	0	21
2	0:02	6	19	1:33	Arizona State	49-yard field goal by Alex Garoutte	0	24
3	14:46				Arizona State	Kickoff returned 98 yards for touchdown by Jamal Miles, Alex Garoutte kick good	0	31
3	6:03	9	81	4:05	Arizona State	Aaron Pflugrad 13-yard touchdown reception from Brock Osweiler, Alex Garoutte kick good	0	38
3	0:48	8	34	2:50	Arizona State	25-yard field goal by Alex Garoutte	0	41
4	12:21	7	69	3:20	UC Davis	Nick Aprile 48-yard touchdown run, Sean Kelley kick good	7	41
4	9:43	6	31	2:27	Arizona State	Marcus Washington 1-yard touchdown run, Alex Garoutte kick good	7	48
4	6:26	9	71	3:07	UC Davis	Josh Reese 1-yard touchdown run, Sean Kelley kick good	14	48
"TOP" = time of possession. For other American football terms, see Glossary of American football.							14	48

=== Missouri ===
Jamal Miles caught an 11-yard touchdown pass from Brock Osweiler in overtime, then the defense held Missouri out of the end zone on their possession to seal Arizona State's wild win over No. 21 Missouri, 37 - 30. The win was Dennis Erickson's 28th career victory over a ranked opponent.

	1	2	3	4	OT	Total
#21 Tigers	3	7	6	14	0	30
Sun Devils	7	9	7	7	7	37

=== Illinois ===
	1	2	3	4	Total
#22 Sun Devils	7	0	0	7	14
Fighting Illini	10	0	0	7	17

=== USC ===
#23 USC at Arizona State

Team	1	2	3	4	Total
USC	3	6	13	0	22
• Arizona State	7	14	7	15	43

- Date: September 24
- Location: Sun Devil Stadium, Tempe, AZ
- Game start: 10:15 p.m. EST
- Game attendance: 61,495

Scoring summary
1	13:29	ASU	Cameron Marshall 70-yard run (Alex Garoutte kick)	ASU 7-0
1	5:42	USC	Andre Heidari 41-yard field goal	ASU 7-3
2	12:43	ASU	Gerell Robinson 2-yard pass from Brock Osweiler (Alex Garoutte kick)	ASU 14-3
2	7:05	USC	Andre Heidari 29-yard field goal	ASU 14-6
2	2:07	ASU	Jamal Miles 3-yard pass from Brock Osweiler (Alex Garroute kick)	ASU 21-6
2	0:47	USC	Andre Heidari 33-yard field goal	ASU 21-9
3	12:16	USC	Marqise Lee 24-yard pass from Matt Barkley (Andre Heidari kick)	ASU 21-16
3	6:41	USC	Marc Tyler 10-yard run (run failed)	USC 22-21
3	4:11	ASU	Cameron Marshall 3-yard run (Alex Garroutte kick)	ASU 28-22
4	6:48	ASU	Cameron Marshall 4-yard run (Brock Osweiler to Jamal Miles pass)	ASU 36-22
4	6:37	ASU	Shelley Lyons 41-yard interception return (Alex Garrutte kick)	ASU 43-22

USC had won the last 11 meetings, with Arizona State last defeating USC in 1999. In this game, USC led 22–21 in the third quarter, but Arizona State then scored 22 unanswered points to win 43–22.

=== Oregon State ===
	1	2	3	4	Total
Beavers	6	7	7	0	20
#25 Sun Devils	0	21	7	7	35

=== Utah ===
#22 Arizona State at Utah

Team	1	2	3	4	Total
• Arizona State	7	3	18	7	35
Utah	7	0	7	0	14

- Date: October 8
- Location: Rice-Eccles Stadium, Salt Lake City, UT
- Game start: 3:30 p.m. EST
- Game attendance: 45,089

Scoring summary
1	10:01	UTAH	John White IV 30-yard run (Coleman Petersen kick)	UTAH 7-0
1	4:31	ASU	Jamal Miles 5-yard pass from Brock Osweiler (Alex Garoutte kick)	Tied 7-7
2	1:22	ASU	Alex Garoutte 27-yard field goal	ASU 10-7
3	10:32	UTAH	Dallin Rogers 2-yard pass from Jon Hays (Coleman Petersen kick)	UTAH 14-10
3	5:00	ASU	Alex Garoutte 35-yard field goal	UTAH 14-13
3	2:33	ASU	Mike Willie 14-yard pass from Brock Osweiler (Brock Osweiler to Aaron Pflugard pass)	ASU 21-14
3	1:17	ASU	Cameron Marshall 4-yard run (Alex Garoutte kick)	ASU 28-14
4	10:39	ASU	Mike Willie 12-yard pass from Brock Osweiler (Alex Garoutte kick)	ASU 35-14

=== Oregon ===
	1	2	3	4	Total
#18 Sun Devils	14	3	7	3	27
#9 Ducks	7	14	14	6	41

=== Colorado ===
	1	2	3	4	Total
Buffaloes	0	7	0	7	14
#23 Sun Devils	21	10	10	7	48

=== UCLA ===
	1	2	3	4	Total
#20 Sun Devils	7	7	7	7	28
Bruins	6	10	7	6	29

First Quarter scoring: UCLA – Johnathan Franklin 11-yard run (Tyler Gonzalez kick failed); ASU – A.J. Pickens 35-yard pass from Brock Osweiler (Alex Garoutte kick)

Second Quarter scoring: ASU – C. Marshall 14-yard run (Garoutte kick); UCLA – Gonzalez 43-yard field goal; UCLA – Derrick Coleman 1-yard run (Gonzalez kick)

Third Quarter scoring: UCLA – Nelson Rosario 76-yard pass from Kevin Prince (Gonzalez kick); ASU – Jamal Miles, 9-yard pass from Brock Osweiler (Garoutte kick)

Fourth Quarter scoring: ASU – Osweiler 1-yard run (Garoutte kick); UCLA – Coleman 1-yard run (Prince pass failed)

=== Washington State ===
	1	2	3	4	Total
Sun Devils	7	13	7	0	27
Cougars	6	10	7	14	37

=== Arizona ===
	1	2	3	4	Total
Wildcats	14	3	0	14	31
Sun Devils	7	14	3	3	27

=== California ===
	1	2	3	4	Total
Golden Bears	17	10	14	6	47
Sun Devils	7	21	10	0	38

=== Boise State–Maaco Bowl Las Vegas ===
	1	2	3	4	Total
Sun Devils	0	3	7	14	24
#8 Broncos	14	14	7	21	56

== Rankings ==
Ranking movements Legend: ██ Increase in ranking ██ Decrease in ranking — = Not ranked RV = Received votes
	Week															
Poll	Pre	1	2	3	4	5	6	7	8	9	10	11	12	13	14	Final
AP	RV	RV	22	RV	25	22	18	24	23	20	RV	RV	—	—	—	—
Coaches	RV	23	18	RV	RV	24	20	25	20	18	RV	RV	—	—	—	—
Harris	Not released						19	23	20	19	RV	RV	—	—	—	Not released
BCS	Not released							—	21	19	—	—	—	—	—	Not released
