= Jaelen Strong =

American football player (born 1994)

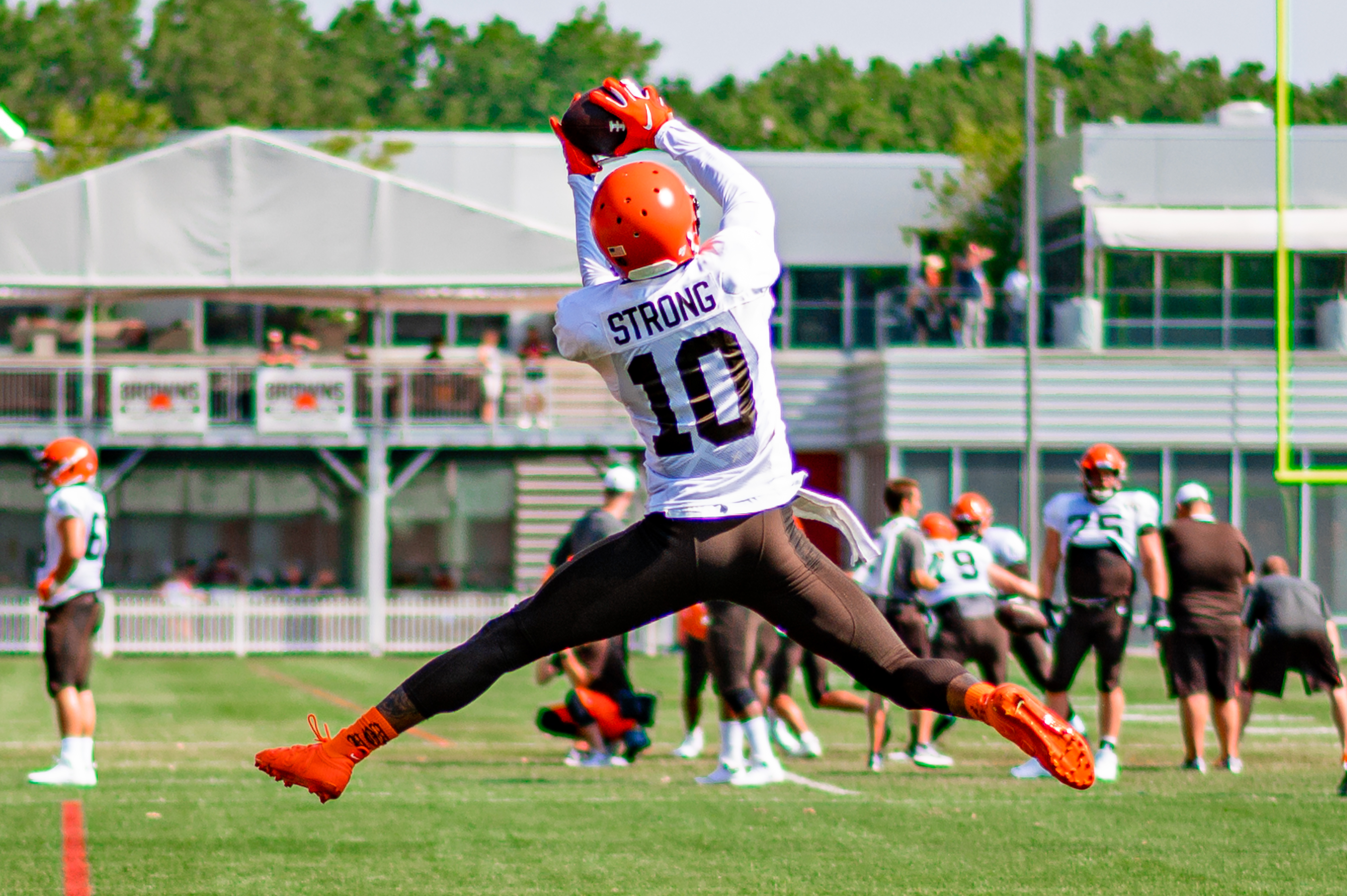
- Strong at Cleveland Browns training camp in 2019

No. 11, 10
- Position: Wide receiver

Personal information
- Born: January 25, 1994 (age 32); Philadelphia, Pennsylvania, U.S.
- Listed height: 6 ft 2 in (1.88 m)
- Listed weight: 220 lb (100 kg)

Career information
- High school: West Catholic (Philadelphia)
- College: Pierce College (2011–2012); Arizona State (2013–2014)
- NFL draft: 2015: 3rd round, 70th overall pick

Career history
- Houston Texans (2015–2017); Jacksonville Jaguars (2017); Cleveland Browns (2019)*
- * Offseason or practice squad member only

Awards and highlights
- First-team All-Pac-12 (2014); Second-team All-Pac-12 (2013)

Career NFL statistics
- Receptions: 31
- Receiving yards: 330
- Receiving touchdowns: 4
- Stats at Pro Football Reference

Jaelen Strong (born January 25, 1994) is an American former professional football player who was a wide receiver in the National Football League (NFL). He played college football for the Arizona State Sun Devils.

== Early life ==
Strong's father, John Rankin, played college basketball at Drexel and died of leukemia in 2003 when Strong was 9. Strong attended West Catholic Preparatory High School in Philadelphia, Pennsylvania, where he played football and ran track. As a junior, he caught 24 passes for 385 yards with four touchdowns. As a senior, he had 17 receptions for 318 yards and four touchdowns. He had scholarship offers from Eastern Michigan, Villanova and VMI before opting to attend Pierce College. In track & field, Strong posted personal-bests of 6.42 meters (20-11.5) in the long jump and 12.42 meters (40-6.5) in the triple jump.

== College career ==
Strong attended Los Angeles Pierce College for two years before transferring to Arizona State University. At Pierce in 2012, he had 67 receptions for 1,263 yards and 15 touchdowns in 10 games. In his first season at Arizona State in 2013, he had 75 receptions for 1,122 yards and seven touchdowns. In 2014, he had 82 receptions for 1,165 yards and 10 touchdowns.

After his junior season, Strong entered the 2015 NFL draft.

== Professional career ==
=== Pre-draft ===
Coming into the draft, Strong was ranked by some analysts as a late first-round prospect. He had been criticized for his lack of vertical speed, but surprised many with a 4.44 40-yard dash at the NFL Combine. His vertical jump of 42 inches was the 4th best among wide receivers over the past ten years.

Pre-draft measurables
Height	Weight	Arm length	Hand span	Wingspan	40-yard dash	10-yard split	20-yard split	20-yard shuttle	Three-cone drill	Vertical jump	Broad jump	Bench press	Wonderlic
6 ft 2 3/8 in (1.89 m)	217 lb (98 kg)	32 1/2 in (0.83 m)	9 in (0.23 m)	6 ft 4 3/4 in (1.95 m)	4.44 s	1.57 s	2.59 s	4.21 s	7.34 s	42.0 in (1.07 m)	10 ft 3 in (3.12 m)	14 reps	22
All values from NFL Combine/Pro Day

=== Houston Texans ===
Strong was selected by the Houston Texans with the 70th overall pick in the third round of the 2015 NFL draft. The Texans traded with the New York Jets for the pick, giving away their own third round pick (82nd overall, Jets picked Lorenzo Mauldin), their fifth round pick (152nd overall, Jets picked Jarvis Harrison), a seventh round pick via the Cleveland Browns (229th overall, Jets traded pick to Jacksonville Jaguars), and wide receiver DeVier Posey. Against the Indianapolis Colts on October 8, 2015, he made his first two career receptions, both for touchdowns; the first was on a 42-yard hail mary pass to end the first half. He finished his rookie season with 14 receptions for 161 yards and three touchdowns.

In Week 8 of the 2016 season, Strong suffered a serious ankle sprain against the Lions. The injury kept him out the next five weeks before being placed on injured reserve on December 10, 2016. He finished his second season with 14 receptions for 131 yards with no touchdowns in eight games.

Strong was suspended the first game of the 2017 season for violating the NFL Policy and Program for Substances of Abuse.

On September 18, 2017, Strong was released by the Texans.

=== Jacksonville Jaguars ===
On September 19, 2017, Strong was claimed off waivers by the Jacksonville Jaguars. He was released by the Jaguars on November 18, and was re-signed to the practice squad. Strong was promoted to the active roster on December 23. In Week 16, Strong caught three passes for 38 yards and a touchdown. However, he suffered a torn ACL in the game and was placed on injured reserve on December 26. Strong was released by Jacksonville on April 30, 2018.

=== Cleveland Browns ===
After spending the 2018 season out of the NFL, Strong was signed by the Cleveland Browns on February 20, 2019. Strong was waived by the Browns on August 27.

== Personal life ==
On February 28, 2016, Strong was arrested in Scottsdale, Arizona for marijuana possession. He was later released from jail.
