= Thomas Weber (American football) =

American football player (born 1987)

No. 28
- Position: Placekicker

Personal information
- Born: September 27, 1987 (age 39)
- Listed height: 6 ft 1 in (1.85 m)
- Listed weight: 207 lb (94 kg)

Career information
- High school: Loyola (Los Angeles, California)
- College: Arizona State (2007–2010)

Awards and highlights
- Lou Groza Award (2007); First-team All-American (2007); First-team All-Pac-10 (2007)
- Stats at Pro Football Reference

Thomas Edward Weber (born September 27, 1987) is an American former football placekicker. He was signed by the Cincinnati Bengals as an undrafted free agent in 2011, but never was a member of the active roster. He played college football for the Arizona State Sun Devils, where he won the Lou Groza Award.

== College career ==
Weber won the Lou Groza Award for the nation's top kicker following the 2007 season, in which he made 24-of-25 field goals and 46-of-48 extra point attempts.

== Professional career ==
Pre-draft measurables
Height	Weight
6 ft 0 1/2 in (1.84 m)	200 lb (91 kg)
All values from Pro Day

Weber signed with the Cincinnati Bengals as an undrafted free agent prior to the 2011 season on July 28, 2011. He was waived during final roster cuts on September 3, 2011. He re-signed with the team on January 6, 2012, but he was waived again on August 17, 2012.
