= 2010 Oregon State Beavers football team =

American college football season

2010 Oregon State Beavers football
- Conference: Pacific-10 Conference
- Record: 5–7 (4–5 Pac-10)
- Head coach: Mike Riley (10th season)
- Offensive coordinator: Danny Langsdorf (6th season)
- Offensive scheme: Multiple
- Defensive coordinator: Mark Banker (8th season)
- Base defense: 4–3
- Captains: James Dockery; Alex Linnenkohl; Gabe Miller; Stephen Paea; Dwight Roberson; James Rodgers
- Home stadium: Reser Stadium

Uniform

2010 Pacific-10 Conference football standings
	Conf.			Overall
Team	W		L	W		L
No. 3 Oregon $	9	–	0	12	–	1
No. 4 Stanford %	8	–	1	12	–	1
USC †	5	–	4	8	–	5
Washington	5	–	4	7	–	6
Arizona	4	–	5	7	–	6
Arizona State	4	–	5	6	–	6
Oregon State	4	–	5	5	–	7
California	3	–	6	5	–	7
UCLA	2	–	7	4	–	8
Washington State	1	–	8	2	–	10
$ – BCS representative as conference champion; % – BCS at-large representative; † – USC ineligible for championship and post-season due to NCAA sanctions; Rankings from AP Poll

The 2010 Oregon State Beavers football team represented Oregon State University during the 2010 NCAA Division I FBS football season. The team's head coach was Mike Riley, in his eighth straight season and tenth overall. Home games were played at Reser Stadium in Corvallis and they were members of the Pacific-10 Conference. The Beavers finished the season 5–7, 4–5 in Pac-10 play.

== Schedule ==
Date	Time	Opponent	Rank	Site	TV	Result	Attendance
September 4	4:45 pm	vs. No. 6 TCU*	No. 24	Cowboys Stadium; Arlington, Texas (Cowboys Classic)	ESPN	L 21–30	46,138
September 18	2:20 pm	Louisville*	No. 25	Reser Stadium; Corvallis, Oregon	FSNNW	W 35–28	45,379
September 25	5:00 pm	at No. 3 Boise State*	No. 24	Bronco Stadium; Boise, Idaho (College GameDay)	ABC	L 24–37	34,137
October 2	3:30 pm	Arizona State		Reser Stadium; Corvallis, Oregon	FSN	W 31–28	45,409
October 9	3:00 pm	at No. 9 Arizona		Arizona Stadium; Tucson, Arizona	Versus	W 29–27	56,054
October 16	7:15 pm	at Washington	No. 24	Husky Stadium; Seattle	ESPN	L 34–35 ^{2OT}	65,235
October 30	12:30 pm	California^{†}		Reser Stadium; Corvallis, Oregon	FCS	W 35–7	45,439
November 6	4:00 pm	at UCLA		Rose Bowl; Pasadena, California	Versus	L 14–17	64,330
November 13	1:00 pm	Washington State		Reser Stadium; Corvallis, Oregon	FSNNW	L 14–31	45,389
November 20	5:00 pm	No. 20 USC		Reser Stadium; Corvallis, Oregon	ABC	W 36–7	44,969
November 27	4:30 pm	at No. 7 Stanford		Stanford Stadium; Stanford, California	Versus	L 0–38	38,775
December 4	12:30 pm	No. 1 Oregon		Reser Stadium; Corvallis, Oregon (Civil War / College GameDay)	ABC	L 20–37	46,469
*Non-conference game; ^{†}Homecoming; Rankings from AP Poll released prior to the game; All times are in Pacific time

== Rankings ==
Ranking movements Legend: ██ Increase in ranking ██ Decrease in ranking — = Not ranked RV = Received votes
	Week															
Poll	Pre	1	2	3	4	5	6	7	8	9	10	11	12	13	14	Final
AP	24	RV	25	24	RV	RV	24	RV	RV	RV	—	—	—	—	—	—
Coaches	22	RV	RV	RV	—	RV	RV	—	—	—	—	—	—	—	—	—
Harris	Not released						—	—	—	—	—	—	—	—	—	Not released
BCS	Not released							—	—	—	—	—	—	—	—	Not released

== Roster ==
2010 Oregon State Beavers
Centers: 60 Alex Linnenkohl; Cornerbacks: 4 James Dockery; 6 Sean Martin; 14 Jordan Poyer; 16 Rashaad Reynolds; 17 Brandon Hardin; 20 Keynan Parker; 21 Ryan Handford; 38 Brian Watkins; 47 Tyler Anderson; Defensive ends: 49 Andrew Seumalo; 76 John Braun; 91 Taylor Henry; 92 Mitchel Hunt; 93 Mana Rosa; 94 Devon Krell; 95 Scott Crichton; 96 Dominic Glover; 99 Gabe Miller; Defensive line: 79 Joe Lopez	Defensive tackles: 54 Stephen Paea; 61 Tonu Tuimalealiifano; 66 Ben Motter; 74 Kevin Frahm; 75 Nathan Hannah; 77 Evan Hull; 78 Brennan Olander; 97 Mana Tuivailala; 98 Castro Masaniai; Fullbacks: 33 Will Darkins; 42 Clayton York; Linebackers: 13 Reuben Robinson; 29 Zane Norris; 35 Keith Pankey; 36 Josh Parish; 40 Michael Doctor; 41 Feti Unga; 43 Tony Wilson; 44 Uani Unga; 45 Michael Bibbee; 48 Walker Vave; 51 Charlie Gilmur; 52 Keo Camat; 55 Shaydon Akuna; 59 Dwight Roberson	Long snappers: 57 Marcus Perry; 58 Michael Morovick; Offensive guards: 70 Grant Johnson; Offensive linemen: 51 Michael Beaton; 53 Colin Lyons; 61 Michael Lamb; 62 Geoff Garner; 63 Ryan Pohl; 64 Colin Kelly; 65 Roman Sapolu; 67 Rory Ross; 68 Wilder McAndrews; 69 Joshua Andrews; 71 Grant Enger; 72 Timi Oshinowo; 74 Burke Ellis; 75 Derek Nielsen; 79 Aaron Magnuson; Offensive tackles: 50 Mike Remmers; 77 Michael Philip	Punters: 7 Johnny Hekker; 48 Keith Kostol; Place kickers: 18 Max Johnson; 27 Justin Kahut; Quarterbacks: 4 Sean Mannion; 12 Ryan Katz; 14 Cody Vaz; 17 Jack Lomax; Running backs: 1 Jacquizz Rodgers; 19 Jovan Stevenson; 22 Malcolm Marable; 24 Ryan McCants; 34 Jordan Jenkins; Safeties: 3 Anthony Watkins; 5 Cameron Collins; 10 Lance Mitchell; 12 Dax Dilbeck; 25 Ryan Murphy; 26 Josh LaGrone; 28 Suaesi Tuimaunei; 30 Zeke Sanders; 46 Shiloah Te'o	Tight ends: 80 John Reese; 82 Colby Prince; 83 Brady Camp; 87 Joe Halahuni; 88 Tyler Perry; 89 Conner Hamlett; Wide receivers: 2 Markus Wheaton; 8 James Rodgers; 9 Kevan Walker; 15 Darrell Catchings; 18 Geno Munoz; 21 Mitch Singler; 23 Jordan Bishop; 28 Danny Evans; 46 Aaron Nichols; 81 Micah Hatfield; 84 Kevin Cummings; 85 Brett Ackerman; 86 Obum Gwacham

== Game summaries ==
=== Vs. No. 6 TCU ===
	1	2	3	4	Total
No. 24 Beavers	7	7	7	0	21
No. 6 Horned Frogs	7	14	7	2	30

Statistics	ORST	TCU
First downs	13	28
Total yards	255	453
Rushing yards	73	278
Passing yards	182	175
Turnovers	0	2
Time of possession	20:37	39:23

Team	Category	Player	Statistics
Oregon State	Passing	Ryan Katz	9/25, 159 yards, 2 TD
Oregon State	Rushing	Jacquizz Rodgers	18 rushes, 75 yards, TD
Oregon State	Receiving	James Rodgers	4 receptions, 75 yards, TD
TCU	Passing	Andy Dalton	17/27, 175 yards, TD, 2 INT
TCU	Rushing	Ed Wesley	17 rushes, 134 yards, TD
TCU	Receiving	Skye Dawson	4 receptions, 69 yards

=== Louisville ===
	1	2	3	4	Total
Cardinals	0	14	7	7	28
No. 25 Beavers	7	14	14	0	35

Statistics	LOU	ORST
First downs	24	19
Total yards	453	319
Rushing yards	165	177
Passing yards	288	142
Turnovers	2	0
Time of possession	33:22	26:38

Team	Category	Player	Statistics
Louisville	Passing	Adam Froman	22/38, 288 yards, TD, INT
Louisville	Rushing	Bilal Powell	20 rushes, 83 yards, TD
Louisville	Receiving	Doug Beaumont	9 receptions, 121 yards
Oregon State	Passing	Ryan Katz	15/26, 142 yards, 2 TD
Oregon State	Rushing	Jacquizz Rodgers	24 rushes, 132 yards, 2 TD
Oregon State	Receiving	Darrell Catchings	2 receptions, 36 yards

=== At No. 3 Boise State ===
	1	2	3	4	Total
Beavers	7	3	14	0	24
No. 3 Broncos	7	17	7	6	37

Statistics	ORST	BSU
First downs	16	22
Total yards	237	469
Rushing yards	78	175
Passing yards	159	294
Turnovers	0	1
Time of possession	26:42	33:18

Team	Category	Player	Statistics
Oregon State	Passing	Ryan Katz	12/26, 159 yards, TD
Oregon State	Rushing	Jacquizz Rodgers	18 rushes, 46 yards, TD
Oregon State	Receiving	Joe Halahuni	3 receptions, 56 yards, TD
Boise State	Passing	Kellen Moore	19/27, 288 yards, 3 TD
Boise State	Rushing	Doug Martin	19 rushes, 138 yards
Boise State	Receiving	Titus Young	5 receptions, 136 yards, TD

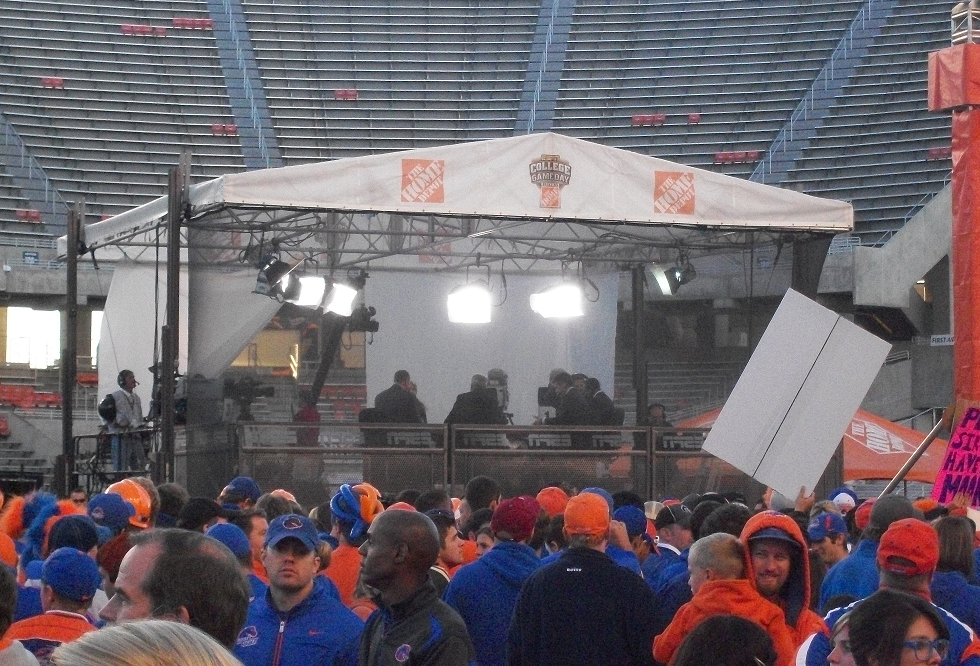
Boise State fans and the GameDay set inside of Bronco Stadium

=== Arizona State ===
	1	2	3	4	Total
Sun Devils	7	7	3	11	28
Beavers	10	14	0	7	31

Statistics	ASU	ORST
First downs	24	17
Total yards	364	416
Rushing yards	161	156
Passing yards	203	260
Turnovers	3	0
Time of possession	30:12	29:48

Team	Category	Player	Statistics
Arizona State	Passing	Steven Threet	14/29, 203 yards, TD, 3 INT
Arizona State	Rushing	Deantre Lewis	20 rushes, 104 yards, TD
Arizona State	Receiving	Gerell Robinson	4 receptions, 73 yards, TD
Oregon State	Passing	Ryan Katz	19/29, 260 yards, 2 TD
Oregon State	Rushing	Jacquizz Rodgers	24 rushes, 145 yards, 2 TD
Oregon State	Receiving	Jordan Bishop	4 receptions, 86 yards

=== At No. 9 Arizona ===
	1	2	3	4	Total
Beavers	10	7	6	6	29
No. 9 Wildcats	7	0	13	7	27

Statistics	ORST	ARIZ
First downs	25	26
Total yards	486	541
Rushing yards	93	101
Passing yards	393	440
Turnovers	1	1
Time of possession	36:23	23:37

Team	Category	Player	Statistics
Oregon State	Passing	Ryan Katz	30/42, 393 yards, 2 TD, INT
Oregon State	Rushing	Jacquizz Rodgers	25 rushes, 83 yards, TD
Oregon State	Receiving	Markus Wheaton	7 receptions, 113 yards, TD
Arizona	Passing	Nick Foles	35/46, 440 yards, 3 TD, INT
Arizona	Rushing	Keola Antolin	8 rushes, 70 yards, TD
Arizona	Receiving	Juron Criner	12 receptions, 179 yards, TD

=== At Washington ===
	1	2	3	4	OT	2OT	Total
No. 24 Beavers	0	14	7	0	7	6	34
Huskies	7	14	0	0	7	7	35

Statistics	ORST	WASH
First downs	22	26
Total yards	353	475
Rushing yards	147	189
Passing yards	206	286
Turnovers	3	3
Time of possession	29:43	30:17

Team	Category	Player	Statistics
Oregon State	Passing	Ryan Katz	17/31, 206 yards, TD, 3 INT
Oregon State	Rushing	Jacquizz Rodgers	32 rushes, 140 yards, 3 TD
Oregon State	Receiving	Aaron Nichols	5 receptions, 72 yards
Washington	Passing	Jake Locker	21/35, 286 yards, 5 TD, INT
Washington	Rushing	Chris Polk	25 rushes, 105 yards
Washington	Receiving	Jermaine Kearse	9 receptions, 146 yards, 4 TD

Washington's Jake Locker threw a career-high five touchdown passes, two in overtime to Jermaine Kearse, and the Huskies stopped the Beavers 2-point conversion in double overtime to keep their bowl hopes alive.

Chris Polk ran for 105 yards on 25 carries for the Huskies.

Beavers running back Jacquizz Rodgers ran for 140 yards on 32 carries and three touchdowns. He also caught four passes for 49 yards and a 10-yard TD catch in the first overtime. The Beavers were playing their first game since Rodgers' brother, James, was lost for the season because of a serious knee injury.

The game came down to the Beavers final possession in the second overtime. On 4th down from the UW 4-yard line, Beaver quarterback Ryan Katz's pass for John Reese fell to the turf in the end zone. The Huskies stormed the field, only then to realize a late flag from back judge Johnny Jenkins was for pass interference against the Huskies' Desmond Trufant.

Jacquizz Rodgers then scored from the 2 on the next play to pull Oregon State to 35–34. Beavers coach Mike Riley called timeout and decided to go for two. But Katz's throw fell out of Joe Halahuni's hands as he was hit by linebacker Cort Dennison and Washington's celebration was on again.

Washington snapped a six-game losing streak to the Beavers.

=== California ===
	1	2	3	4	Total
Golden Bears	0	0	0	7	7
Beavers	14	14	7	0	35

Statistics	CAL	ORST
First downs	10	23
Total yards	209	392
Rushing yards	23	179
Passing yards	186	213
Turnovers	1	0
Time of possession	26:37	33:23

Team	Category	Player	Statistics
California	Passing	Brock Mansion	14/24, 141 yards, TD
California	Rushing	Shane Vereen	12 rushes, 53 yards
California	Receiving	Keenan Allen	8 receptions, 68 yards
Oregon State	Passing	Ryan Katz	22/29, 202 yards, TD
Oregon State	Rushing	Jacquizz Rodgers	21 rushes, 116 yards, 3 TD
Oregon State	Receiving	Markus Wheaton	7 receptions, 72 yards

=== At UCLA ===
	1	2	3	4	Total
Beavers	7	0	7	0	14
Bruins	7	0	7	3	17

Statistics	ORST	UCLA
First downs	16	21
Total yards	267	337
Rushing yards	103	210
Passing yards	164	127
Turnovers	0	1
Time of possession	24:24	35:36

Team	Category	Player	Statistics
Oregon State	Passing	Ryan Katz	18/26, 164 yards, TD
Oregon State	Rushing	Jacquizz Rodgers	14 rushes, 63 yards
Oregon State	Receiving	Joe Halahuni	5 receptions, 60 yards, TD
UCLA	Passing	Richard Brehaut	13/19, 127 yards, INT
UCLA	Rushing	Johnathan Franklin	23 rushes, 100 yards, TD
UCLA	Receiving	Taylor Embree	2 receptions, 54 yards

The Bruins snapped a three-game losing streak with a 51-yard field goal by Kai Forbath with one second left in the game to give UCLA a 17–14 victory over the visiting Beavers. With 1:17 left in the game, Forbath missed a 46-yard field goal, which went wide left. Originally, the field officials had ruled that UCLA had no time left, but the challenge gave the Bruins one more second left to set up the field goal try.

Richard Brehaut scored for UCLA in the first quarter with a seven-yard run and Joe Halahuni did the same for Oregon State with a 28-yard pass from Ryan Katz.

In the third quarter, Markus Wheaton ran for 22-yard touchdown for the Beavers lead and Johnathan Franklin scored from the 1-yard line for a Bruins touchdown to tie the game.

=== Washington State ===
	1	2	3	4	Total
Cougars	0	14	7	10	31
Beavers	0	0	7	7	14

Statistics	WSU	ORST
First downs	22	13
Total yards	378	261
Rushing yards	221	97
Passing yards	157	164
Turnovers	2	3
Time of possession	40:55	19:05

Team	Category	Player	Statistics
Washington State	Passing	Jeff Tuel	10/15, 157 yards, TD
Washington State	Rushing	Jeff Tuel	18 rushes, 79 yards
Washington State	Receiving	Daniel Blackledge	4 receptions, 76 yards
Oregon State	Passing	Ryan Katz	12/21, 155 yards, 2 TD, INT
Oregon State	Rushing	Jacquizz Rodgers	15 rushes, 93 yards
Oregon State	Receiving	Markus Wheaton	6 receptions, 97 yards, 2 TD

=== No. 20 USC ===
	1	2	3	4	Total
No. 20 Trojans	0	0	7	0	7
Beavers	3	17	3	13	36

Statistics	USC	ORST
First downs	18	18
Total yards	255	328
Rushing yards	120	174
Passing yards	135	154
Turnovers	2	0
Time of possession	27:32	32:28

Team	Category	Player	Statistics
USC	Passing	Matt Barkley	10/19, 75 yards, INT
USC	Rushing	C. J. Gable	10 rushes, 57 yards, TD
USC	Receiving	Ronald Johnson	5 receptions, 45 yards
Oregon State	Passing	Ryan Katz	17/24, 154 yards, 2 TD
Oregon State	Rushing	Jacquizz Rodgers	26 rushes, 128 yards, TD
Oregon State	Receiving	James Rodgers	7 receptions, 43 yards

After a field goal in the first quarter, Jordan Poyer took an interception into the end zone to give the Beavers a 10–0 lead in the second quarter. Jacquizz Rodgers scored from the 3-yard line and Justin Kahut kicked his second field goal in the half to give OSU a 20-point lead going into the locker room.

In the third quarter, Kahut hit a 35-yard field goal for Oregon State and C.J. Gable rushed for a 13-yard touchdown for USC. Jordan Bishop caught a 5-yard pass from Ryan Katz to increase the Beavers' lead to 22 in the fourth quarter. Then an 8-yard touchdown pass from Katz to Joe Halahuni sealed the game for the Beavers. The Trojans have lost the last three games in Corvallis. Oregon State's 36–7 victory marked their biggest win over USC in 96 years.

=== At No. 7 Stanford ===
	1	2	3	4	Total
Beavers	0	0	0	0	0
No. 7 Cardinal	14	10	7	7	38

Statistics	ORST	STAN
First downs	20	20
Total yards	285	470
Rushing yards	68	165
Passing yards	217	305
Turnovers	5	0
Time of possession	26:11	33:49

Team	Category	Player	Statistics
Oregon State	Passing	Ryan Katz	19/36, 183 yards, 3 INT
Oregon State	Rushing	Jacquizz Rodgers	17 rushes, 76 yards
Oregon State	Receiving	Aaron Nichols	5 receptions, 53 yards
Stanford	Passing	Andrew Luck	21/30, 305 yards, 4 TD
Stanford	Rushing	Stepfan Taylor	14 rushes, 115 yards, TD
Stanford	Receiving	Doug Baldwin	5 receptions, 97 yards, 2 TD

=== No. 1 Oregon ===
	1	2	3	4	Total
No. 1 Ducks	6	10	7	14	37
Beavers	7	0	3	10	20

Statistics	ORE	ORST
First downs	25	20
Total yards	491	319
Rushing yards	346	90
Passing yards	145	229
Turnovers	2	4
Time of possession	27:52	32:08

Team	Category	Player	Statistics
Oregon	Passing	Darron Thomas	14/24, 145 yards, 2 TD
Oregon	Rushing	LaMichael James	28 rushes, 134 yards, 2 TD
Oregon	Receiving	Jeff Maehl	7 receptions, 86 yards
Oregon State	Passing	Ryan Katz	23/40, 224 yards, 2 TD, 3 INT
Oregon State	Rushing	Jacquizz Rodgers	22 rushes, 87 yards
Oregon State	Receiving	Markus Wheaton	10 receptions, 137 yards, TD
