= 2010 California Golden Bears football team =

American college football season

2010 California Golden Bears football
- Conference: Pacific-10 Conference
- Record: 5–7 (3–6 Pac-10)
- Head coach: Jeff Tedford (9th season)
- Offensive coordinator: Andy Ludwig (2nd season)
- Offensive scheme: Pro-style
- Defensive coordinator: Clancy Pendergast (1st season)
- Base defense: 3–4
- Home stadium: Memorial Stadium

2010 Pacific-10 Conference football standings
	Conf.			Overall
Team	W		L	W		L
No. 3 Oregon $	9	–	0	12	–	1
No. 4 Stanford %	8	–	1	12	–	1
USC †	5	–	4	8	–	5
Washington	5	–	4	7	–	6
Arizona	4	–	5	7	–	6
Arizona State	4	–	5	6	–	6
Oregon State	4	–	5	5	–	7
California	3	–	6	5	–	7
UCLA	2	–	7	4	–	8
Washington State	1	–	8	2	–	10
$ – BCS representative as conference champion; % – BCS at-large representative; † – USC ineligible for championship and post-season due to NCAA sanctions; Rankings from AP Poll

The 2010 California Golden Bears football team represented the University of California, Berkeley in NCAA Division I Football Bowl Subdivision (FBS) competition in the 2010 season. The Golden Bears were led by ninth-year head coach Jeff Tedford.

Tedford surpassed the legendary Pappy Waldorf to become the Cal coach with 3rd most career victories with a victory over UC Davis in the season opener. Despite early successes however, the team had an inconsistent season. The Bears had only one road victory, lost the Stanford Axe to archrival Stanford in a 48–14 blowout, and ended the season with a three-game losing streak to finish 5–7 (3–6 Pac-10), Tedford's first losing season and the team's first losing season since 2001. Cal was ranked only once during the season with a No. 24 spot in the Coaches' Poll.

== Preseason ==
On 19 January 2010, the Regents of the University of California approved the retrofit and renovation of California Memorial Stadium. The $321 million project began in June 2010 and is expected to be completed in time for the 2012 season. The project will renovate the seismically vulnerable west side of the stadium and add amenities such as club levels, restrooms, and a new press box. Renovation of the east side of the stadium will be done at a later time in phase III. The Bears will play at AT&T Park in San Francisco for the 2011 season while the renovations are being made.

Following the 2009 season the Bears saw several coaching changes. Pete Alamar, special teams and tight ends coach, was not asked back for the 2010 season. The Bears had struggled on special teams in 2009, ranking ninth in the conference in kick coverage, 48th nationally, and 99th nationally in punt coverage. Placekicker duties during the season alternated between Giorgio Tavecchio and Vince D'Amato, with consistency an issue. Alamar was succeeded by Jeff Genyk.

Defensive coordinator Bob Gregory, who was first hired by head coach Tedford upon Tedford's arrival at Cal in 2002, left to become a defensive assistant at Boise State. He was succeeded by Clancy Pendergast, who had been hired by the Oakland Raiders on February 8, 2010, as a defensive assistant. Pendergast had previously been the defensive coordinator for the Kansas City Chiefs and Arizona Cardinals. Former NFL players Akili Smith and Ronnie Bradford joined the Cal coaching staff March 12, 2010, as administrative assistants for the offense and defense, respectively. Tedford had previously coached Smith as a quarterback at Oregon.

Jahvid Best announced on January 2, 2010, that he would forgo his senior year and enter the NFL draft. He was picked by the Detroit Lions as the 30th overall selection in the 2010 NFL draft following Tyson Alualu, who was drafted as the 10th overall selection by the Jacksonville Jaguars. This marked the first time since 2003 that two Cal players had been drafted in the first round of the NFL draft. No other players were drafted until Syd'Quan Thompson was taken in the seventh round as the 225th overall selection by the Denver Broncos.

Offensive linemen Chet Teofilo and Mike Tepper signed undrafted free agent contracts with the Dallas Cowboys on April 24. Wide receiver Verran Tucker joined them on April 26, the same day that linebacker Devin Bishop signed a free agent contract with Denver.

Senior quarterback Kevin Riley entered the 2010 season as the Pac-10 leader in wins and touchdown passes. Although head coach Jeff Tedford declared on August 4 that there would be competition for the starting quarterback job., on August 25 he confirmed that Riley would be the starter.

== Schedule ==
Date	Time	Opponent	Site	TV	Result	Attendance	Source
September 4	1:00 p.m.	UC Davis*	Memorial Stadium; Berkeley, CA	CSNCA	W 52–3	58,040	
September 11	12:30 p.m.	Colorado*	Memorial Stadium; Berkeley, CA	FSN	W 52–7	55,440	
September 17	7:00 p.m.	at Nevada*	Mackay Stadium; Reno, NV	ESPN2	L 31–52	28,809	
September 25	7:00 p.m.	at No. 14 Arizona	Arizona Stadium; Tucson, AZ	CSNBA+	L 9–10	51,906	
October 9	12:30 p.m.	UCLA^{†}	Memorial Stadium; Berkeley, CA (rivalry)	FSN	W 35–7	61,664	
October 16	12:30 p.m.	at USC	Los Angeles Memorial Coliseum; Los Angeles, CA	FSN	L 14–48	72,386	
October 23	12:30 p.m.	Arizona State	Memorial Stadium; Berkeley, CA	FSN	W 50–17	51,599	
October 30	12:30 p.m.	at Oregon State	Reser Stadium; Corvallis, OR	FCS Pacific	L 7–35	45,439	
November 6	1:00 p.m.	at Washington State	Martin Stadium; Pullman, WA	CSNCA	W 20–13	17,648	
November 13	4:30 p.m.	No. 1 Oregon	Memorial Stadium; Berkeley, CA	Versus	L 13–15	65,963	
November 20	12:30 p.m.	No. 7 Stanford	Memorial Stadium; Berkeley, CA (The Big Game)	FSN	L 14–48	67,793	
November 27	12:30 p.m.	Washington	Memorial Stadium; Berkeley, CA	CSNCA	L 13–16	44,613	
*Non-conference game; ^{†}Homecoming; Rankings from AP Poll released prior to the game; All times are in Pacific time

== Game summaries ==
=== UC Davis ===
	1	2	3	4	Total
Aggies	0	0	3	0	3
Golden Bears	7	28	14	3	52

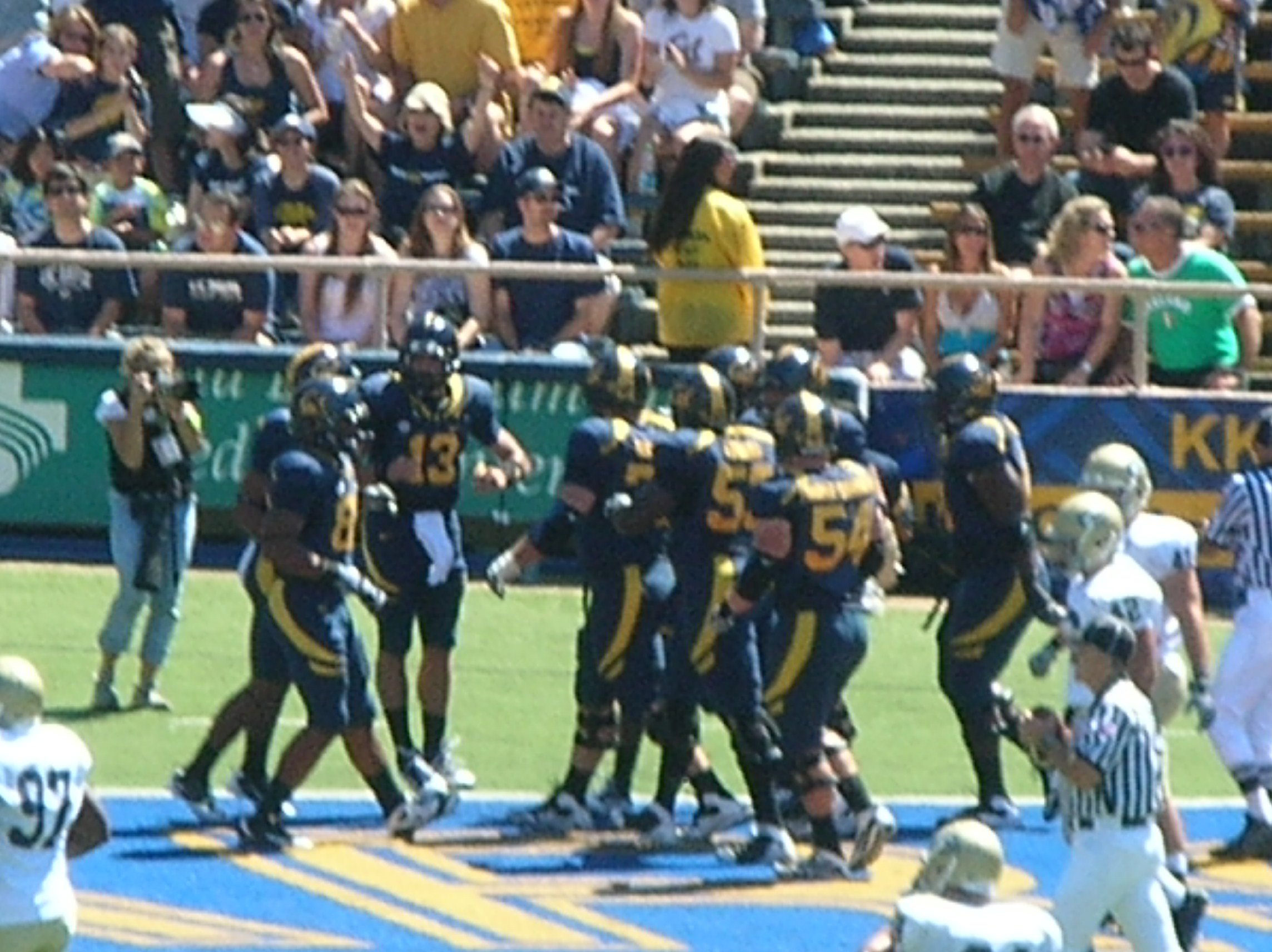
Shane Vereen scores Cal's first touchdown of the game.

The Bears had last played the Aggies in 1939 and had won all eight of the teams' previous meetings. The Aggies recovered a fumble by Kevin Riley on Cal's first possession, but could not capitalize on it. The Bears' first score of the day coming on a 23-yard pass from Riley to Vereen in the first quarter. Cal scored four touchdowns in the second quarter: on a 13-yard pass from Riley to Marvin Jones, an 18-yard run by Keenan Allen, and back to back 7-yard runs by Shane Vereen, the latter set up by an Aggies fumble on the prior kickoff that was recovered. The third quarter saw Allen score his second touchdown of the game on a 48-yard pass from Riley, after which the Bears pulled their starters. Backup quarterback Beau Sweeney scored on a 3-yard run for Cal's final touchdown of the game, while the final score came on a fourth-quarter field goal. UC Davis' sole score of the game came on a third quarter 43-yard field goal.

The win made Jeff Tedford Cal's winningest coach in the modern era with 68 victories, passing the legendary Pappy Waldorf. Kevin Riley threw for 258 yards and three touchdowns, while Shane Vereen had 67 rushing yards for two touchdowns, with a third receiving. Freshman Keenan Allen in his Cal debut had 120 receiving yards for a score and another rushing touchdown. UC Davis redshirt freshman quarterback Randy Wright in his first career start threw for 57 yards. The Bears put together 517 total yards of offense while limiting the Aggies to 81, outpassing them 287 to 67 and outrushing them 230 to 14.

=== Colorado ===
	1	2	3	4	Total
Buffaloes	0	0	7	0	7
Golden Bears	14	17	0	21	52

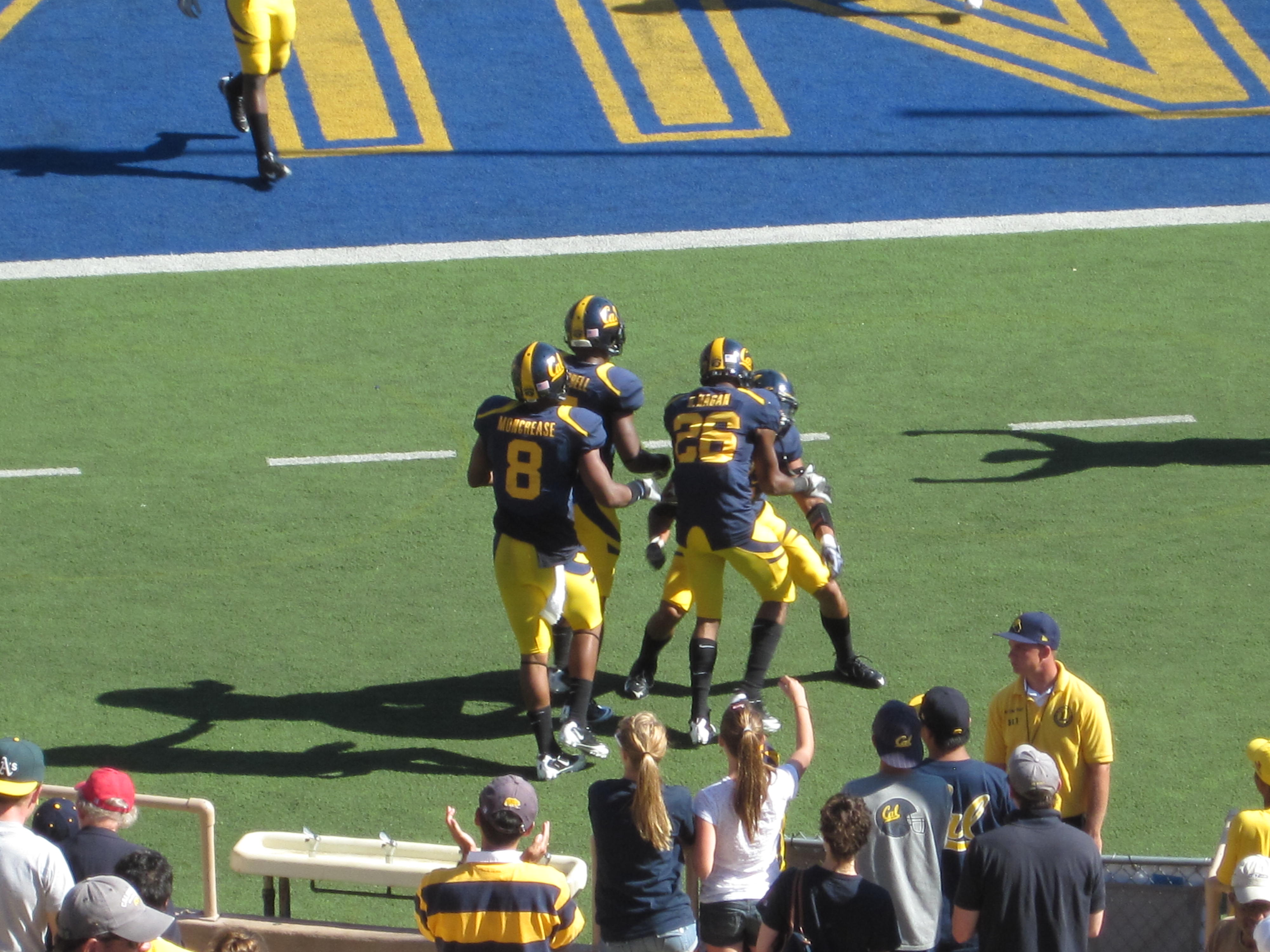
Cal defensive back Darian Hagan scores an 81-yard interception return for a touchdown.

Cal was matched against future Pac-10 member Colorado for the first time since 1982. Taking advantage of a good punt return and a short field, the Bears scored on their second possession of the game on a 13-yard pass from Kevin Riley to Shane Vereen midway into the first quarter. The second score of the quarter was set up by a sack of Buffaloes quarterback Tyler Hansen on the Colorado 46-yard line which forced a fumble. Cal recovered and finished the drive with a 4-yard pass from Riley to Marvin Jones. In the second quarter, Hansen was intercepted, resulting in a field goal. Cal added two touchdowns, one resulting from an 82-yard drive that was capped off by a 3-yard run by Vereen, and another coming in the final minute of the half when Cal linebacker Mike Mohammed intercepted Hansen for a 41-yard touchdown. A Colorado field goal late in the second quarter from 42 yards missed.

The Buffaloes prevented a shutout by making the only score of the third quarter on a 4-yard run by quarterback Hansen. In fourth quarter, Keenan Allen made an 8-yard touchdown reception and running back Isi Sofele made a 1-yard touchdown reception set up by an interception of Hansen deep in Cal territory. In the final minutes of the game the Buffaloes took advantage of a failed 4th down conversion attempt by the Bears with good field position to march downfield, but a pass from Hansen to wide receiver Ryan Deehan was fumbled and recovered by Cal defensive back Darian Hagan, who returned it 81 yards for the final score of the game.

Kevin Riley threw for 197 yards and four scores, all to different receivers. Shane Vereen rushed for 60 yards and one score as well as a receiving touchdown. The Cal defense intercepted Hansen three times, recovered two fumbles, and had six sacks. The victory earned Cal a #24 ranking in the Coaches Poll.

=== Nevada ===
	1	2	3	4	Total
#24 Golden Bears	7	7	10	7	31
Wolf Pack	7	17	14	14	52

Cal's number one defense in the nation was put to the test in the first road game of the season came against Nevada, the nation's number one offense in the teams' first meeting since 1915. The Wolf Pack marched downfield on the game's opening possession in a lengthy drive that culminated in a 15-yard touchdown pass from Colin Kaepernick to Tray Session. Kevin Riley was intercepted on the ensuing drive, but Nevada was unable to capitalize on it. Shane Vereen then broke free for a 59-yard touchdown run to bring Cal even. The second quarter saw the Wolf Pack finish an 85-yard drive with a 1-yard run by Kaepernick. He scored again on an 8-yard run on Nevada's next possession. Cal recovered a deep in Nevada territory and was able to score on a 1-yard run from Vereen. The Bears managed to hold the Wolf Pack to a field goal to close out the quarter to make it 24–14 Nevada at the half.

Cal opened the third quarter with a 50-yard touchdown run by Vereen. After holding the Wolf Pack to a three and out, the Bears were able to drive into Wolf Pack territory where Riley threw an interception to Marlon Johnson that was returned 65 yards for a score. Cal was able to kick a field goal on the following possession, however Nevada drove downfield to the Cal 30-yard line. A 27-yard pass from Kaepernick to Rishard Matthews was fumbled, but Matthews managed to recover the fumble on the goal line, resulting in a touchdown. The Wolf Pack scored again midway through the four quarter on a 54-yard run by Vai Taua. Cal responded with a 71-yard run drive that ended with a 4-yard touchdown pass from Riley to Eric Stevens. Nevada came right back on the ensuing possession for the final score of the game on a 27-yard run by Kaepernick. A late Cal drive was ended with Riley's third interception of the game.

Shane Vereen had a career-high 198 rushing yards and three scores, while wide receiver Marvin Jones also had a career game with 161 receiving yards. Riley threw for 277 yards, a touchdown and three interceptions in the loss. The Wolf Pack had two 100-yard rushers, with Kaepernick running for 148 and three scores, while Vai Taua had 151 yards and a score. Kaepernick threw for 181 yards and two touchdowns in the victory.

=== Arizona ===
	1	2	3	4	Total
Golden Bears	0	6	0	3	9
#16 Wildcats	0	0	3	7	10

The Bears faced the Wildcats in Tucson in the conference opener for both teams. The game was a defensive battle, with the first quarter scoreless. The Cal defense sacked Arizona quarterback Nick Foles late in the quarter and forced a fumble, setting up a 25-yard field goal from Giorgio Tavecchio to begin the second quarter. The Bears added to their lead on a second 40-yard field goal from Tavecchio and stopped a Wildcats drive in the final minute with an interception deep in Cal territory to make it 6–0 at the half. Arizona scored in the third quarter on a 46-yard field goal by Alex Zendejas. Cal failed to score again when a 33-yard attempt by Tavecchio missed. The fourth quarter saw Cal's final score of the game come on a 23-yard field goal to start the quarter. The Bears failed to capitalize on a 48-yard attempt by Zendejas that missed when Tavecchio missed from 40 yards with under 3 minutes left. The Wildcats responded by putting together a 78-yard scoring drive that ended with the only touchdown of the game on a 3-yard pass from Foles to Juron Criner. With a minute left in the game, Cal had a chance to drive downfield and kick a game-winning field goal, but Kevin Riley was intercepted by Joseph Perkins who then fumbled on the return, but Arizona recovered the fumble to hang on and prevent an upset.

Riley threw for 116 yards and an interception, while Shane Vereen had 102 rushing yards as Cal lost its conference opener for the second year in a row. Nick Foles threw for 212 yards, had an interception and was sacked three times, but threw the game-winning touchdown as Arizona improved to 4–0 for the first time since 1998.

=== UCLA ===
	1	2	3	4	Total
Bruins	0	0	7	0	7
Golden Bears	14	14	0	7	35

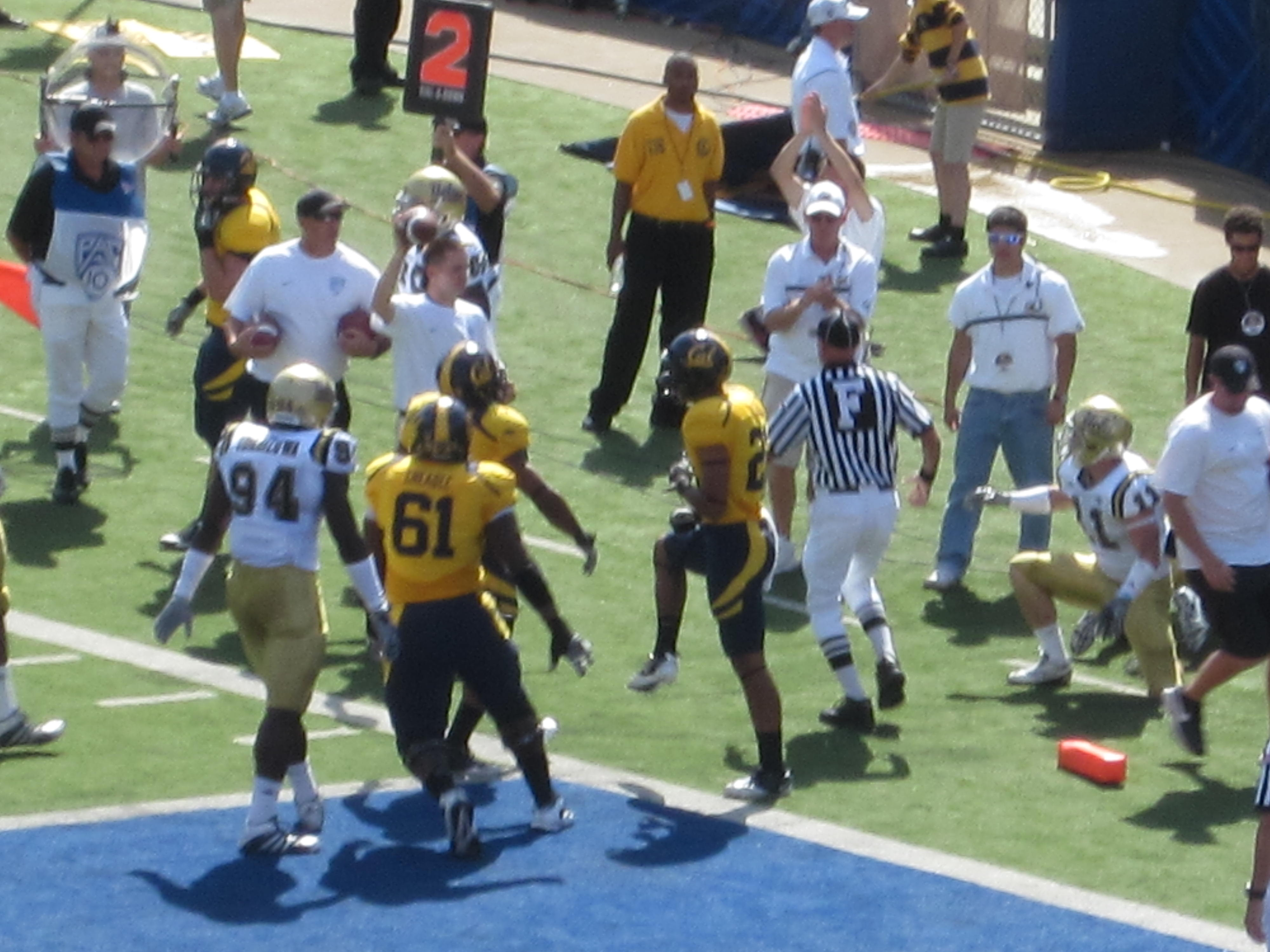
Cal running back Shane Vereen scores in the first quarter.

Cal faced UCLA following a bye week after two straight road losses, while the Bruins came into the matchup on a three-game winning streak with victories against #23 Houston and #7 Texas, with their last victory in Berkeley being in 1998. On the opening possession, the Bears drove downfield in a five-minute scoring drive which was capped off by a 1-yard touchdown run by Shane Vereen. UCLA running back Johnathan Franklin fumbled the ball on the Bruins's second possession deep in UCLA territory, which set up another touchdown run by Veren from 4 yards. The second quarter saw Cal score the third touchdown of the game after a six-minute drive on a 10-yard pass from Kevin Riley to Keenan Allen. In the closing minutes of the second quarter Riley scored on a 1-yard run to put the Bears up 28–0 at the half, as the Cal defense shut down UCLA and limited the Bruins' offensive output to 58 yards.

The Bruins avoided a shutout in the third quarter when they scored on a 6-yard touchdown pass from Kevin Prince to Christian Ramirez. The Bears were unable to capitalize on an interception of Prince by cornerback Darian Hagan when a 48-yard field goal attempt by Giorgio Tavecchio missed. The final score of the game came in the fourth quarter when Cal wide receiver Marvin Jones scored on a 48-yard reverse. With five minutes left in the game Richard Brehaut stepped in for Prince at quarterback. UCLA had a chance to score in the closing minutes of the game on a fumble by Cal wide receiver Jeremy Ross on the punt return which the Bruins recovered, but Brehaut threw four straight incomplete passes.

Cal's first conference victory saw them outgain UCLA 380 total net yards to 143, 297 yards coming on the ground as Riley threw for only 83 yards and a score. Shane Vereen rushed for 151 yards and two touchdowns. The UCLA rushing offense, which had been averaging 262.4 yards per game and was ranked #10 in the nation, was held to just 26 yards. Kevin Prince threw for 99 yards and a score, just the third UCLA touchdown pass of the season in the loss, which snapped a three-game winning streak.

=== USC ===
	1	2	3	4	Total
Golden Bears	0	0	7	7	14
Trojans	14	28	3	3	48

Cal faced USC in Los Angeles with the Trojans coming off a pair of back to back losses for the first time since 2001. USC took control of the game from the beginning, scoring on their first possession on a 16-yard touchdown pass from Matt Barkley to Robert Woods just two minutes into the game. The Trojans struck again when Barkley connected with David Ausberry for a 22-yard touchdown late in the quarter. USC piled on the points in the second quarter, beginning with Marc Tyler scoring on an 11-yard run and Barkley throwing a 10-yard touchdown pass to Woods on USC's next possession. Cal put together a drive which was stopped cold when Kevin Riley threw an interception at the USC 5-yard line. The Trojans capitalized by marching downfield and scoring on an 8-yard touchdown reception by Ronald Johnson. Riley was intercepted again on the first play of the ensuing possession, setting up an 11-yard reception by Johnson. The Trojans scored 42 points in the first half and shut out the Bears, tying a record for the largest halftime deficit in Cal football history.

USC running back Allen Bradford fumbled a reception at the beginning of the third quarter which Cal recovered, but was unable to turn into points. The Bears held the Trojans' scoring to a field goal and put points on the board late in the quarter on a 31-yard touchdown reception by Shane Vereen. Mitch Mustain then stepped in at quarterback for USC. USC kicked another field goal to start the fourth quarter, with the final score of the game coming on an 8-yard reception by Keenan Allen.

Riley threw for 191 yards and two touchdowns with two interceptions, while Shane Vereen was held to 53 rushing yards with a touchdown reception in the loss. The Trojan offense outgained the Bears 589 yards to 254, a season-low for Cal. Matt Barkley passed for 352 yards and a school record-tying five touchdowns, with a pair of touchdown receptions each by Ronald Johnson and Robert Woods, who had 117 receiving yards on the day.

=== Arizona State ===
	1	2	3	4	Total
Sun Devils	3	0	7	7	17
Golden Bears	10	16	14	10	50

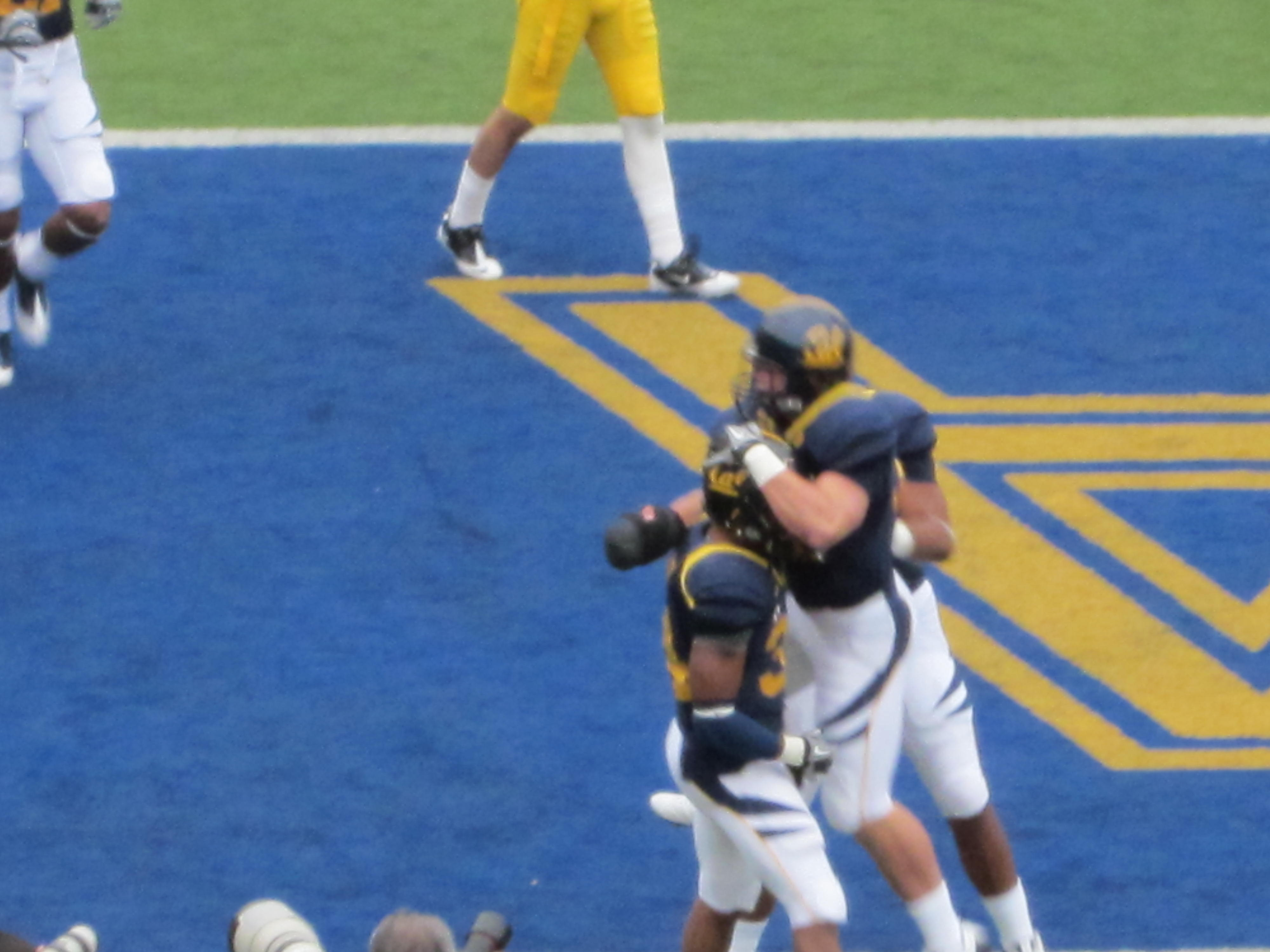
Cal running back Shane Vereen scores the game's opening touchdown

Cal faced Arizona State, who was coming off a bye week and looking for their first win in Berkeley since 1997. Although Sun Devils quarterback Steven Threet completed passes of 44 and 26 yards on the opening possession, Arizona State had to settle for a field goal, after which Cal took control of the game. The Bears responded with a drive that also resulted in a field goal, then intercepted Threet deep in Cal territory, but couldn't capitalize on the turnover. After forcing a three and out, Cal took advantage of a 28-yard punt return by wide receiver Jeremy Ross that gave them great field possession on the Arizona State 28-yard line. The Bears took advantage of two Sun Devils penalties with Shane Vereen scoring the game's first touchdown on an 8-yard run. Cal scored again to open the second quarter on a 4-yard pass from Kevin Riley to wide receiver Keenan Allen, with the PAT being blocked. Riley then connected with wide receiver Marvin Jones for a 52-yard score. A 37-yard field goal attempt by Arizona State missed, while Cal made one from 23 yards to put the Bears up 26 to 3 at the half.

Third-string quarterback Samson Szakacsy stepped in for Threet, who had been injured. The Bears scored to open the second half on a 5-yard run by Vereen. Two minutes later, the Bears blocked a Sun Devils punt, which was recovered by defensive back Chris Conte for a 7-yard score. Arizona State in turn was able to block a Cal punt for a 1-yard touchdown by linebacker Oliver Aron. Cal opened the fourth quarter with a field goal, then scored on a 19-yard run by wide receiver Jeremy Ross. The final score of the game came on a fumble by backup quarterback Brock Mansion which was recovered by linebacker Brandon Magee for a 26-yard score.

Kevin Riley threw for 240 yards and two scores, while Shane Vereen rushed for 91 yards, tying him for fifth place in career rushing touchdowns with Justin Forsett, while wide receiver Marvin Jones had 110 receiving yards and a score. Steven Threet threw for 130 yards with two interceptions and Szakacsy able to only manage 66. The Sun Devils were held to 51 rushing yards.

=== Oregon State ===
	1	2	3	4	Total
Golden Bears	0	0	0	7	7
Beavers	14	14	7	0	35

Oregon State came into the matchup following a bye week and dominated Cal throughout. The Beavers started their first possession at midfield and scored on an 11-yard touchdown pass from running back Jacquizz Rodgers to Colby Prince. Kevin Riley sustained a season-ending knee injury midway through the quarter when he was tackled low by defensive tackle Brennan Olander and left the game, with backup Brock Mansion stepping in. Rodgers scored his second touchdown of the game on a 2-yard run in the final minutes of the first quarter. He scored again from 1 yard out to open the second quarter, and the Beavers added to their lead on a 17-yard touchdown pass from Ryan Katz to Joe Halahuni. Although a 37-yard field goal attempt missed, Oregon State was up 28–0 at halftime, the most first half points scored by the Beavers thus far in the season.

The Beavers put in their final score of the game in the third quarter on a 10-yard run by Rodgers. In the fourth quarter Katz and Rodgers were pulled from the game and replaced by Cody Vaz and Ryan McCants, respectively. Cal was in danger of being shut out until the final minute of the game, when Mansion connected with Anthony Miller for a 45-yard touchdown.

Brock Mansion, who had previously only passed for 26 yards in his career, threw for 138 and was sacked four times. Shane Vereen was held to 53 rushing yards and did not catch a pass for the first time in his career, which broke a streak of 34 straight games in which he had a reception, the longest streak among active FBS running backs. Oregon State quarterback Ryan Katz threw for 184 yards and a score and was sacked three times, while Jacquizz Rodgers, who accounted for four of the Beavers' five touchdowns, three on the ground and one through the air, rushed for 119. The loss made Cal 0–4 in road games on the season.

=== Washington State ===
	1	2	3	4	Total
Golden Bears	0	7	7	6	20
Cougars	0	10	3	0	13

Cal's final road game of the season came against Washington State, who had yet to gain a victory over a Pac-10 opponent during the season. The game marked the first collegiate start for Brock Mansion in place of Kevin Riley. The Bears missed a chance to score first when a 37-yard field goal attempt missed. Washington State opened the second quarter with a 10-yard touchdown run from Logwone Mitz, which Cal responded to with a scoring drive on the ensuing possession which ended on a 2-yard touchdown run by Shane Vereen. The Cougars made a 51-yard field goal for the final score of the half and were unable to capitalize on an interception of Mansion when a 50-yard field goal attempt missed. At 10–7, Washington State had their first halftime lead since 2007.

The Bears retook the lead in the third quarter on a 27-yard touchdown run by Jeremy Ross. Mansion's second interception of the game helped set up a 48-yard field goal to cut Cal's lead to 1 point. Vereen scored on a 1-yard run in the fourth quarter with the PAT missing, leaving the Cougars with a chance to tie the game with six minutes left. The Bears' defense however managed to prevent the Cougars from scoring to help Cal earn its first road victory since the 2009 Big Game.

Brock Mansion threw for 174 yards and two interceptions in his first start, while Shane Vereen rushed for 112 yards and two scores, and wide receiver Marvin Jones had 101 receiving yards. Washington State quarterback Jeff Tuel threw for 92 yards, no interceptions, and was sacked six times in the loss.

=== Oregon ===
	1	2	3	4	Total
#1 Ducks	0	8	7	0	15
Golden Bears	7	0	6	0	13

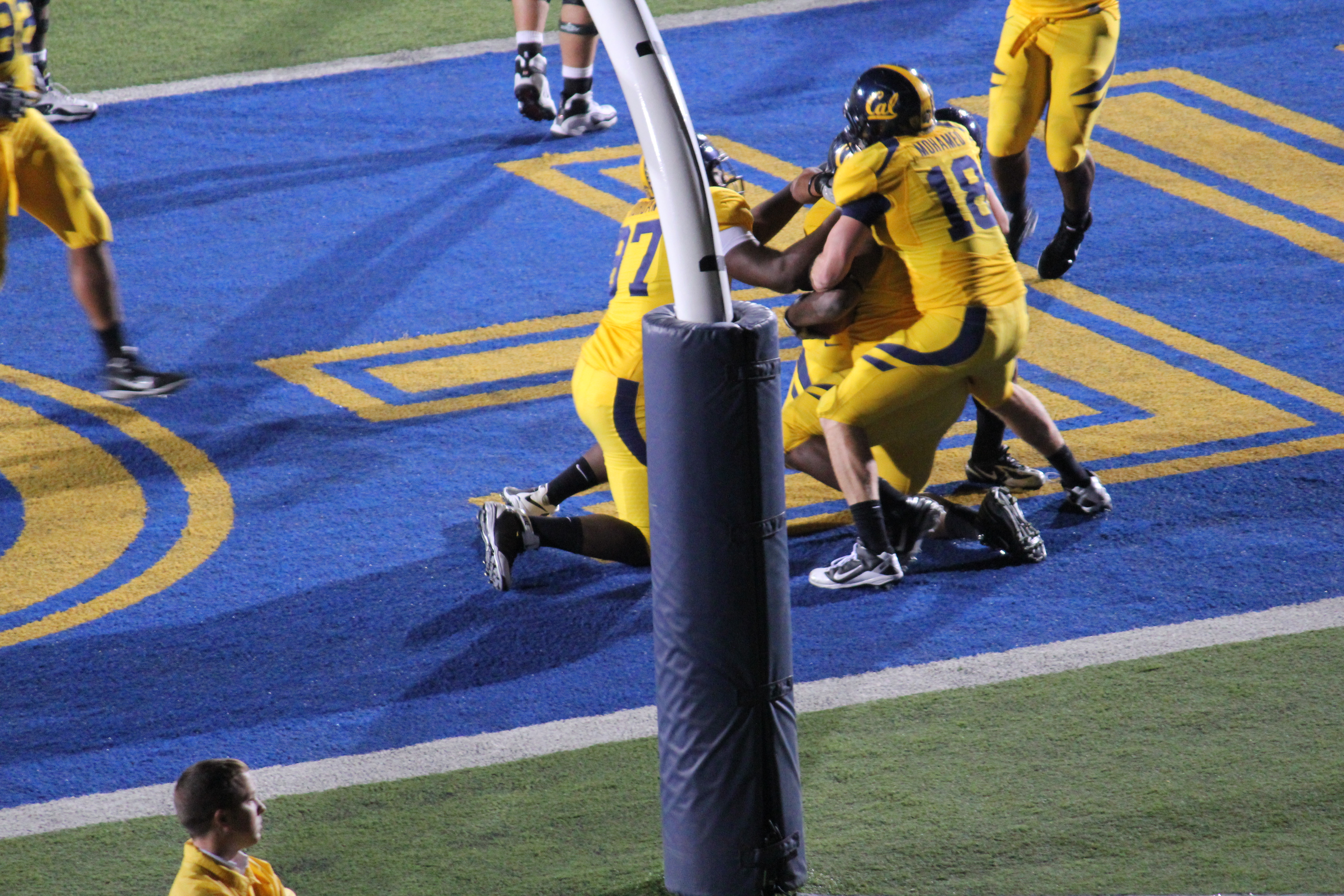
Cal nose guard Derrick Hill scores on a fumble recovery.

Cal's unbeaten home record was put to the test against undefeated and top-ranked Oregon. The Bears began their first possession with good field position at the Oregon 48-yard line and behind Shane Vereen, were able to put together a drive that he finished off with a 2-yard run. The Oregon offense was held scoreless for the second week in a row, and the Ducks did not score until more than halfway through the second quarter on a 64-yard punt return for a touchdown by Cliff Harris, with a successful 2-point conversion. The Ducks failed to add to their lead when a 37-yard field goal attempt missed.

The third quarter opened with a fumble by Vereen that Oregon recovered. Darron Thomas then connected with Jeff Maehl for a 29-yard touchdown, the Ducks' sole offensive touchdown of the game. A second Oregon field goal attempt, this one form 48 yards, missed. The final score of the game came when Thomas was sacked by Cal nose guard Derrick Hill on the Oregon 12-yard line and fumbled, with Hill recovering the fumble for a touchdown. The Bears were unable to tie the score when a 2-point conversion failed. Cal had a chance to take the lead to open the fourth quarter, but kicker Giorgio Tavecchio was penalized for an illegal motion after making a 24-yard attempt, then missed on the subsequent 29-yard attempt. After getting the ball back with nine and a half minutes left in the game, Oregon never relinquished the ball, sustaining a time-consuming drive that ended with Thomas to taking three straight knees to preserve the win and stave off an upset.

In his second career start, Cal quarterback Brock Mansion threw for only 69 yards as the Bears were unable to mount an effective offense with the exception of Shane Vereen, who rushed for 112 yards and a touchdown, tying him for third all-time in rushing touchdowns alongside Jahvid Best and Marshawn Lynch. The Oregon offense was held to a season-low 317 yards, with LaMichael James, the leading rusher in the country, held to 91 yards, while Thomas threw for 155 and a score.

After the game, head coach Jeff Tedford denied that his players had faked injuries in order to slow down the Oregon offense, a tactic Oregon's opponents were accused of all season. On November 27, defensive line coach Tosh Lupoi was suspended for Cal's final season game against Washington for instructing a player to fake an injury during the matchup against Oregon. Lupoi was determined to have been the only person involved in such behavior.

=== Stanford ===
	1	2	3	4	Total
#6 Cardinal	10	21	14	3	48
Golden Bears	0	0	0	14	14

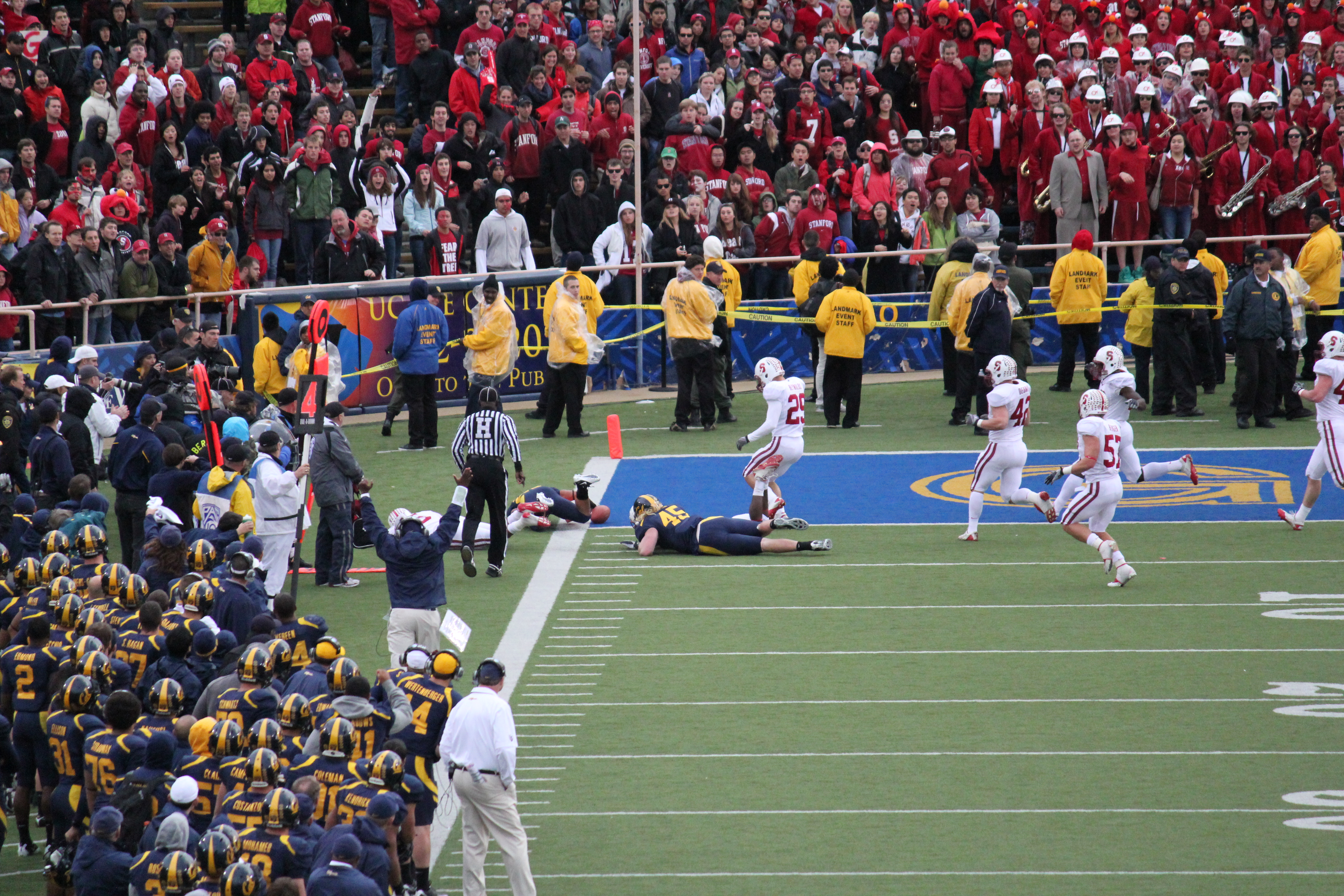
Cal running back Isi Sofele scores the Bears' second touchdown of the game in the closing seconds.

The 113th Big Game began with a spirited exchange when both teams met at midfield during the coin toss, which resulted in Stanford wide receiver Jamal-Rashad Patterson getting ejected for a personal foul. The Cardinal went on to control the game from the beginning, recovering a fumble by Cal quarterback Brock Mansion on the third play of the game and turning it into a field goal. The Bears were able to put together a drive in response that ended at the Stanford 5-yard line when Mansion threw an interception to Richard Sherman. A 58-yard scramble from quarterback Andrew Luck then helped set up a 3-yard score from running back Stepfan Taylor. The second quarter saw Stanford score on each of their three possessions. Taylor scored again on a 1-yard on run, while Luck threw a 13-yard touchdown pass to Zach Ertz and a 19-yard score to Doug Baldwin, the latter set up by Mansion's second interception of the game. The Cardinal were up 31–0 at the half.

Stanford opened the third quarter with a 64-yard scoring drive that was capped off by a 4-yard run by Taylor, and scored again on a 4-yard run by Anthony Wilkerson. Cal ended the shutout when wide receiver Keenan Allen threw a 17-yard touchdown pass to fellow wide receiver Marvin Jones at the beginning of the fourth quarter. The Cardinal's final score of the game came on a 41-yard field goal. In the closing seconds of the game, the Golden Bears performed the hook and lateral as Mansion passed to Allen who immediately lateraled the ball to running back Isi Sofele, who scored on a 17-yard touchdown.

In his third career start, Brock Mansion threw for 173 yards and a touchdown and accounted for all three of Cal's turnovers, with a fumble and two interceptions. One bright spot for the Bears came when running back Shane Vereen's 63 rushing yards moved him over the 1,000 yard mark for the season. Stanford quarterback Andrew Luck threw for 235 yards with two touchdowns, and was the Cardinal's leading rusher with 72 yards, while running back Stepfan Taylor scored three rushing touchdowns. The #6 Cardinal's 48–14 victory marked the worst Cal loss in the Big Game in 80 years since a 41–0 shutout in 1930, as they reclaimed Stanford Axe for the first time since 2007. Stanford's 48 points tied with Cal's 1975 total for the most points scored by either team in 113 Big Games. Stanford remained in contention for an at-large BCS berth while Cal remained a game short of bowl-eligibility.

=== Washington ===
	1	2	3	4	Total
Huskies	0	0	10	6	16
Golden Bears	0	3	7	3	13

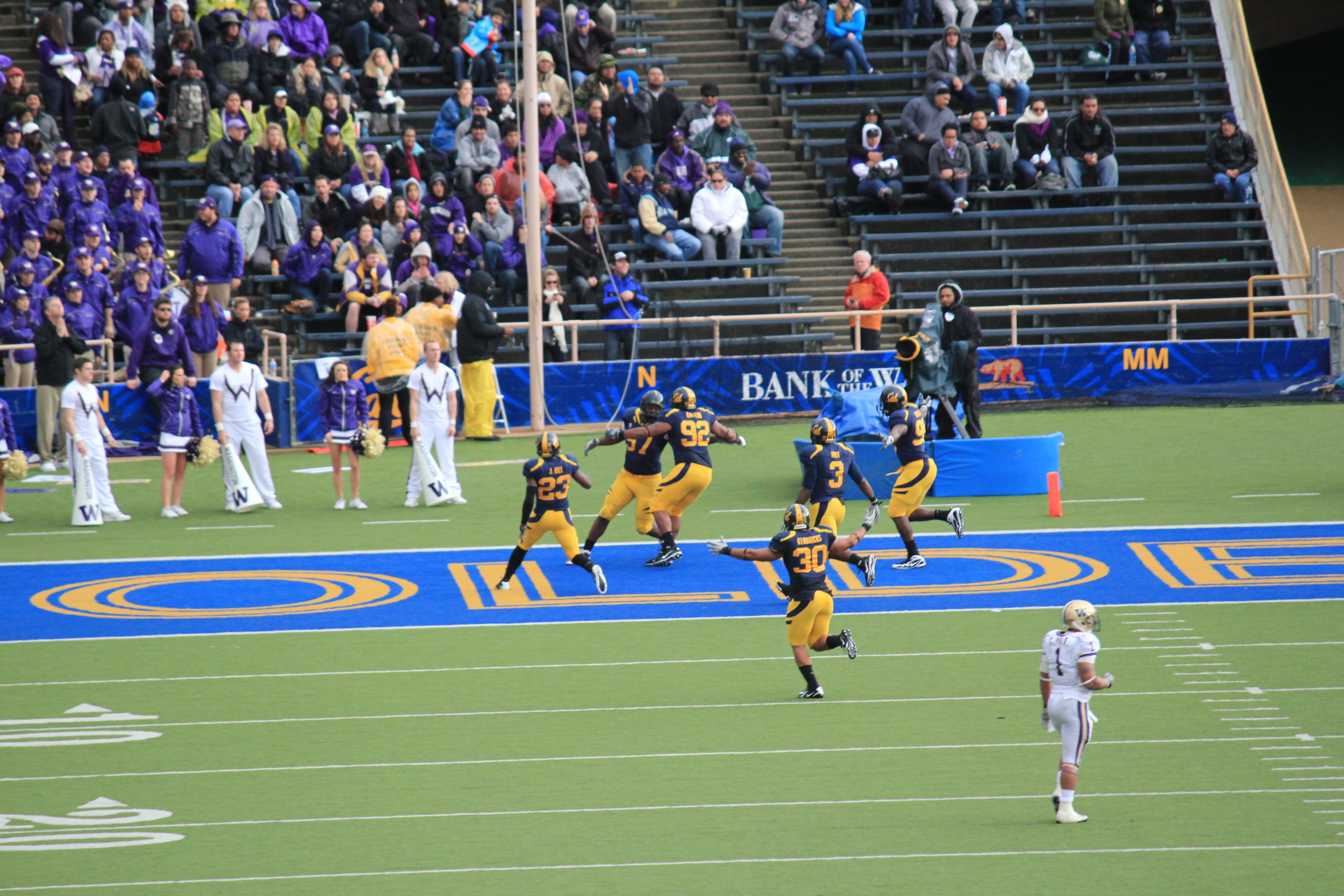
Cal defensive lineman Cameron Jordan (no. 97) scores the Bears' sole touchdown of the game on a fumble recovery.

The final game played at California Memorial Stadium in its present configuration had post-season implications for both teams, with Cal needing a sixth victory to be bowl-eligible and Washington needing a victory to keep its bowl hopes alive. Both teams were unable effectively move the ball in the first quarter. In the second quarter, the Bears recovered a fumble by Huskies running back Jesse Callier, but quarterback Brock Mansion then threw an interception to give the ball right back. Jake Locker was in turn intercepted by Marc Anthony on the Cal 1-yard line. The sole points of the half came on a 53-yard field goal by Giorgio Tavecchio, a career best, with 1 second left.

Washington got on the board on its first possession of the second half when Locker connected with wide receiver D'Andre Goodwin for an 80-yard touchdown. Cal's sole touchdown of the game came on defense, when Locker was sacked in Washington territory by linebacker Mike Mohammed and fumbled, enabling defensive lineman Cameron Jordan to recover the fumble for a 21-yard touchdown. The Huskies were able to come back and tie the game on a 37-yard field goal in the closing seconds of the quarter. The Bears regained the lead with a 47-yard field goal to open the fourth quarter. In the final minutes of the game, Locker was able to complete a 46-yard pass to Jamaal Kearse, enabling the Huskies to drive down to the 1-yard line. After two straight rushes by Locker failed, running back Chris Polk was able to score the game-winning touchdown with 2 seconds left in the game.

Quarterback Brock Mansion took his third straight loss in his fourth career start, with 92 yards passing and an interception. Running back Shane Vereen finished with 106 rushing yards, finishing the season with 1,167. The Bears finished 5–7, head coach Jeff Tedford's first losing season, and the team's first losing season since 2001. Cal had its streak of 43 straight home games with at least 50,000 fans in attendance snapped as the game drew a crowd of 44,613. Washington's Jake Locker threw for 237 yards, with a touchdown and interception, as the Huskies' bowl hopes stayed alive.

== Awards and honors ==
- November 17 – Linebacker Mike Mohamed was named to the first-team on the Pac-10 All-Academic Football Team. He was also named a National Football Foundation Scholar-Athlete Award winner and was a finalist for the William V. Campbell Trophy, known as the academic Heisman.
- Mitchell Schwartz was a second-team All-Pac-10 choice, and was first-team on Phil Steele's midseason All-Pac-10 team and second-team on his postseason All-Pac-10 squad. He was a member of the Jewish Sports Review's 2010 College Football All-America Team, received Cal's Brick Muller Award as its Most Valuable Offensive Lineman for the second straight year, and won Cal's Andy Smith Award as its player with the most Big "C" time. He was also an honorable mention Pac-10 All-Academic selection for the third consecutive season.

== Postseason ==
- December 17, 2010 – Wide receivers coach Kevin Daft, who had been with the program since 2004 and strength and conditioning coach John Krasinski, who had been with the program since 2002, were released from the team. Offensive line coach Steve Marshall, who had been with Cal since 2009, left to take the same position at Colorado.
- December 31, 2010 – Eric Kiesau rejoined the team as the passing game coordinator/wide receivers coach. He had previously been the wide receivers coach from 2002–2005 before joining the coaching staff at Colorado.
- January 1, 2011 – Starting running back Shane Vereen announced that he would enter the NFL draft, foregoing a remaining season of eligibility. He had graduated in December 2010 with a degree in Media Studies.
- January 4, 2011 – Defensive backs coach Al Simmons, who held the position from 2008–2010, departed the program. He was replaced by former NFL cornerback Ashley Ambrose, who was the defensive backs coach in 2010 at Colorado.
- January 25, 2011 – Offensive coordinator and quarterbacks coach Andy Ludwig, who had been with the program since 2009, left to become the offensive coordinator at San Diego State.
- February 5, 2011 – Jim Michalczik rejoined the program as the offensive coordinator/offensive line coach, having previously been the offensive line coach from 2002–2008. Marcus Arroyo joined the staff as quarterbacks coach and assistant head coach and running backs coach Ron Gould was promoted to run game coordinator.
- April 28–30, 2011 – In the 2011 NFL draft, defensive end Cameron Jordan was selected in the first round by the New Orleans Saints, followed by running back Shane Vereen in the second round by the New England Patriots, safety Chris Conte in the third round by the Chicago Bears, and linebacker Mike Mohamed in the sixth round by the Denver Broncos.
