= Kevin Prince =

Kevin Prince may refer to:

- Kevin Prince (American football)
- Kevin Prince (politician)

== See also ==
- Kevin-Prince Boateng, footballer
