= 2010 UCLA Bruins football team =

American college football season

2010 UCLA Bruins football
- Conference: Pacific-10 Conference
- Record: 4–8 (2–7 Pac-10)
- Head coach: Rick Neuheisel (3rd season)
- Offensive coordinator: Norm Chow (3rd season)
- Offensive scheme: Pro-style
- Defensive coordinator: Chuck Bullough (2nd season)
- Base defense: 3–4
- Home stadium: Rose Bowl

Uniform

2010 Pacific-10 Conference football standings
	Conf.			Overall
Team	W		L	W		L
No. 3 Oregon $	9	–	0	12	–	1
No. 4 Stanford %	8	–	1	12	–	1
USC †	5	–	4	8	–	5
Washington	5	–	4	7	–	6
Arizona	4	–	5	7	–	6
Arizona State	4	–	5	6	–	6
Oregon State	4	–	5	5	–	7
California	3	–	6	5	–	7
UCLA	2	–	7	4	–	8
Washington State	1	–	8	2	–	10
$ – BCS representative as conference champion; % – BCS at-large representative; † – USC ineligible for championship and post-season due to NCAA sanctions; Rankings from AP Poll

The 2010 UCLA Bruins football team represented the University of California, Los Angeles (UCLA) in the 2010 NCAA Division I FBS football season. Coached by third-year head coach Rick Neuheisel, they opened the season on the road against the Kansas State Wildcats on September 4, 2010. The next three games were against ranked opponents, and after a road win at #7 (AP) Texas, expectations for the Bruins dampened by their 0–2 start began to rise again. However, the season turned for the worse and included two three-game losing streaks against Pac-10 opponents, the latter to end the season on a three-game skid. The Bruins, coming off a bowl win the year before, found themselves ineligible for bowl play with their 4–8 overall record and finished ninth in the Pac-10.

Player injuries and other attrition depleted UCLA of its roster depth, while true freshmen were forced into action and seniors who were previously reserves became starters; a quarterback who had attempted only 17 passes in his career became the starter.

== Recruiting ==
The first Wednesday in February was the start of signing day in college football, February 3, 2010 – April 1, 2010. For midyear junior college transfer, the period was December 16, 2009 to January 15, 2010.

UCLA's recruits:

College recruiting
Name	Hometown	School	Height	Weight	40^{‡}	Commit date
Darius Bell; QB	San Francisco	City College of San Francisco	6 ft 1 in (1.85 m)	218 lb (99 kg)	N/A	Jul 13, 2010
Darius Bell; QB	Recruit ratings: Scout: (NR)					
Casey Griffiths; OT	Sacramento, California	American River College	6 ft 5 in (1.96 m)	280 lb (130 kg)	N/A	Jul 13, 2010
Casey Griffiths; OT	Recruit ratings: (NR)					
Owamagbe Odighizuwa; DE	Portland, Oregon	David Douglas High School	6 ft 4 in (1.93 m)	240 lb (110 kg)	4.70	Feb 3, 2010
Owamagbe Odighizuwa; DE	Recruit ratings: Scout: Rivals: 247Sports: ESPN: (84)					
Dietrich Riley; S	La Cañada Flintridge, California	St. Francis High School	6 ft 1 in (1.85 m)	195 lb (88 kg)	4.50	Feb 3, 2010
Dietrich Riley; S	Recruit ratings: Scout: Rivals: 247Sports: ESPN: (81)					
Anthony Jefferson; CB	Los Angeles, California	Cathedral High School	6 ft 2 in (1.88 m)	180 lb (82 kg)	4.50	Feb 3, 2010
Anthony Jefferson; CB	Recruit ratings: Scout: Rivals: 247Sports: ESPN: (77)					
Jordan Zumwalt; MLB	Huntington Beach, California	Edison High School	6 ft 4 in (1.93 m)	217 lb (98 kg)	4.70	Feb 3, 2010
Jordan Zumwalt; MLB	Recruit ratings: Scout: Rivals: 247Sports: ESPN: (76)					
Sealii Epenesa; DT	Honolulu, HI	Iolani High School	6 ft 2 in (1.88 m)	300 lb (140 kg)	5.4	Jan 29, 2010
Sealii Epenesa; DT	Recruit ratings: Scout: Rivals: 247Sports: ESPN: (76)					
Cassius Marsh; DT	Westlake Village, California	Oaks Christian High School	6 ft 4 in (1.93 m)	270 lb (120 kg)	4.90	Jan 26, 2010
Cassius Marsh; DT	Recruit ratings: Scout: Rivals: 247Sports: ESPN: (79)					
Anthony Barr; OLB	Torrance, California	Loyola High School	6 ft 4 in (1.93 m)	225 lb (102 kg)	4.55	Jan 21, 2010
Anthony Barr; OLB	Recruit ratings: Scout: Rivals: 247Sports: ESPN: (81)					
Wade Yandall; OG	Carson, California	Carson High School	6 ft 4 in (1.93 m)	290 lb (130 kg)	5.40	Jan 10, 2010
Wade Yandall; OG	Recruit ratings: Scout: Rivals: 247Sports: ESPN: (73)					
Kip Smith; K	Broomfield, Colorado	Legacy High School	6 ft 1 in (1.85 m)	205 lb (93 kg)	N/A	Nov 23, 2009
Kip Smith; K	Recruit ratings: Scout: Rivals: 247Sports: ESPN: (80)					
Aramide Olaniyan; OLB	Woodberry Forest, Virginia	Woodberry Forest School	6 ft 2 in (1.88 m)	200 lb (91 kg)	4.60	Nov 16, 2009
Aramide Olaniyan; OLB	Recruit ratings: Scout: Rivals: 247Sports: ESPN: (81)					
Jordon James; RB	Corona, California	Corona High School	5 ft 10 in (1.78 m)	190 lb (86 kg)	4.45	Nov 12, 2009
Jordon James; RB	Recruit ratings: Scout: Rivals: 247Sports: ESPN: (83)					
Eric Kendricks; MLB	Fresno, California	Herbert Hoover High School	6 ft 1 in (1.85 m)	213 lb (97 kg)	4.60	Nov 3, 2009
Eric Kendricks; MLB	Recruit ratings: Scout: Rivals: 247Sports: ESPN: (77)					
John Young; TE	Los Angeles, California	Loyola High School	6 ft 4 in (1.93 m)	250 lb (110 kg)	4.70	Nov 1, 2009
John Young; TE	Recruit ratings: Scout: Rivals: 247Sports: ESPN: (73)					
Kody Innes; OT	Scottsdale, Arizona	Saguaro High School	6 ft 3 in (1.91 m)	273 lb (124 kg)	4.90	Oct 29, 2009
Kody Innes; OT	Recruit ratings: Scout: Rivals: 247Sports: ESPN: (77)					
Chris Ward; OG	Santa Ana, California	Mater Dei High School	6 ft 5 in (1.96 m)	290 lb (130 kg)	5.30	Oct 10, 2009
Chris Ward; OG	Recruit ratings: Scout: Rivals: 247Sports: ESPN: (79)					
Malcolm Jones; RB	Westlake Village, California	Oaks Christian High School	6 ft 1 in (1.85 m)	210 lb (95 kg)	4.60	Oct 8, 2009
Malcolm Jones; RB	Recruit ratings: Scout: Rivals: 247Sports: ESPN: (81)					
Derrick Bryant; DE	Columbus, Ohio	Brookhaven High School	6 ft 4 in (1.93 m)	230 lb (100 kg)	4.55	Sep 20, 2009
Derrick Bryant; DE	Recruit ratings: Scout: Rivals: 247Sports: ESPN: (76)					
Wesley Flowers; DT	Fresno, California	Edison High School	6 ft 4 in (1.93 m)	253 lb (115 kg)	4.90	Jun 23, 2009
Wesley Flowers; DT	Recruit ratings: Scout: Rivals: 247Sports: ESPN: (75)					
Tevin McDonald; CB	Fresno, California	Edison High School	5 ft 11 in (1.80 m)	180 lb (82 kg)	4.60	Jun 18, 2009
Tevin McDonald; CB	Recruit ratings: Scout: Rivals: 247Sports: ESPN: (79)					
Overall recruit ranking: Scout: 14 Rivals: 8 247Sports: 10 ESPN: 10
Note: In many cases, Scout, Rivals, 247Sports, On3, and ESPN may conflict in their listings of height and weight.; In these cases, the average was taken. ESPN grades are on a 100-point scale.; Sources: "2010 Team Ranking". Rivals.com.

== Spring practice ==
- Week one – April 1 (4:00 p.m.), April 2 (4:00 p.m.) and April 3 (12:00 noon)
- Week two – April 6 (4:00 p.m.), April 8 (4:00 p.m.), April 9 (4:00 p.m.) and April 11 (11:00 a.m.)
- Week three – April 12 (4:00 p.m.), April 13 (4:00 p.m.), April 15 (4:00 p.m.) and April 16 (4:00 p.m.)
- Week four – April 19 (4:00 p.m.), April 20 (4:00 p.m.), April 22 (2:30 p.m.)
- Spring game – April 24, 7 p.m., Rose Bowl

== Pre-season practice ==
- Monday, August 9 – 3:00-6:00 p.m.
- Tuesday, August 10 – 10:00 am-1:00 p.m.
- Wednesday, August 11 – 3:00-6:00 p.m.
- Thursday, August 12 – 10:00 am-1:00 p.m.
- Friday, August 13 – 4:00-6:00 pm (First day of full pads)
- Saturday, August 14 – 9:00-11:00 a.m. and 4:00-6:00 p.m.
- Sunday, August 15 -3:00-5:15 p.m.

- Monday, August 16 – 9:00-11:00 a.m. and 4:00-6:00 p.m.
- Tuesday, August 17 -3:00-5:15 p.m.
- Wednesday, August 18 – 9:00-11:00 a.m. and 4:00-6:00 p.m.
- Thursday, August 19 – 3:00-5:15 p.m.
- Friday, August 20 – 9:00-11:00 a.m. and 4:00-6:00 p.m.
- Saturday, August 21 – 5:00 p.m. (Scrimmage at Drake Stadium)

== Notes ==
- Quarterback Kevin Prince changed his uniform number to No. 4 to match Brett Favre's number.
- 23 UCLA alumni on the preseason rosters of 15 National Football League teams, including: Jacksonville Jaguars LB Kyle Bosworth, RB Maurice Jones-Drew, and TE Marcedes Lewis; and Washington Redskins WR/KR Terrence Austin, S Chris Horton, and TE Logan Paulsen.

== Key players ==
Offensive
- QB – 4 Kevin Prince
- TB – 23 Johnathan Franklin
- F – 7 Morrell Presley
- SE – 83 Nelson Rosario
- LT – 72 Sean Sheller
- LG – 77 Darius Savage
- C – 66 Ryan Taylor
- RG – 62 Eddie Williams
- RT – 73 Micah Kia
- TE – 87 Cory Harkey
- FL – 82 Taylor Embree

Special teams
- PK – 25 Kai Forbath
- P – 18 Jeff Locke
- KO – 18 Jeff Locke
- KO ret – 3 Josh Smith
- P ret – 82 Taylor Embree
- H – 39 Danny Rees
- LS – 52 Christian Yount

Defensive
- LE – 89 Nate Chandler
- DT – 99 Justin Edison
- DT – 85 David Carter
- RE – 97 Damien Holmes
- SLB – 10 Akeem Ayers
- MLB – 42 Patrick Larimore
- WLB – 11 Sean Westgate
- LCB – 22 Sheldon Price
- FS – 3 Rahim Moore
- SS – 6 Tony Dye
- RCB – 21 Aaron Hester

== Schedule ==
Date	Time	Opponent	Site	TV	Result	Attendance
September 4	12:30 pm	at Kansas State*	Bill Snyder Family Football Stadium; Manhattan, KS	ABC/ESPN2	L 22–31	51,059
September 11	7:30 pm	No. 25 Stanford	Rose Bowl; Pasadena, CA (rivalry)	ESPN	L 0–35	56,931
September 18	7:30 pm	No. 23 Houston*	Rose Bowl; Pasadena, CA	FSN	W 31–13	54,407
September 25	12:30 pm	at No. 7 Texas*	Darrell K Royal–Texas Memorial Stadium; Austin, TX	ABC/ESPN	W 34–12	101,437
October 2	12:30 pm	Washington State	Rose Bowl; Pasadena, CA	FSPT	W 42–28	62,072
October 9	12:30 pm	at California	California Memorial Stadium; Berkeley, CA (rivalry)	FSN	L 7–35	61,664
October 21	6:00 pm	at No. 1 Oregon	Autzen Stadium; Eugene, OR	ESPN	L 13–60	59,372
October 30	12:30 pm	No. 15 Arizona^{†}	Rose Bowl; Pasadena, CA	FSN	L 21–29	53,408
November 6	4:00 pm	Oregon State	Rose Bowl; Pasadena, CA	Versus	W 17–14	64,330
November 18	5:00 pm	at Washington	Husky Stadium; Seattle, WA	ESPN	L 7–24	62,347
November 26	12:30 pm	at Arizona State	Sun Devil Stadium; Tempe, AZ	FSN	L 34–55	44,555
December 4	7:30 pm	USC	Rose Bowl; Pasadena, CA (Victory Bell)	FSN	L 14–28	71,105
*Non-conference game; ^{†}Homecoming; Rankings from AP; All times are in Pacific time

== Game summaries ==
=== Kansas State ===
	1	2	3	4	Total
Bruins	0	10	3	9	22
Wildcats	7	0	10	14	31

Last year, the Bruins defeated the Wildcats 23-9 at the Rose Bowl.

1st quarter scoring: KSU – Daniel Thomas 1 yd. run (A. Cantele kick).

2nd quarter scoring: UCLA – Kevin Prince 11 yd. run (Kai Forbath kick); Kai Forbath 44 yd. field goal.

3rd quarter scoring: KSU – William Powell 28 yd. run (Cantele, A. kick); UCLA – Kai Forbath 35 yd. field goal; KSU – A. Cantele 35 yd. field goal.

4th quarter scoring: UCLA – Kai Forbath 42 yd. field goal; KSU – Brodrick Smith 5 yd. pass from Coffman; KSU – Carson (A. Cantele kick); UCLA – Ricky Marvray 29 yd. pass from Prince; UCLA – Kevin Prince (Kevin Prince pass failed); KSU – Daniel Thomas 35 yd. run (A. Cantele kick).

=== Stanford ===
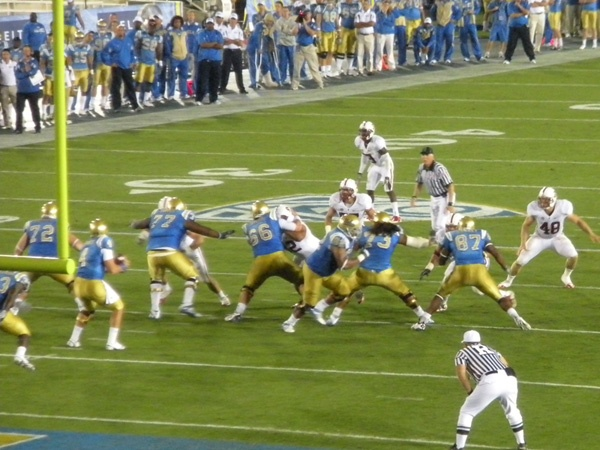
Stanford Cardinal visits UCLA Bruins in the Rose Bowl

	1	2	3	4	Total
#25 Cardinal	10	3	15	7	35
Bruins	0	0	0	0	0

This game was the first time the Cardinal defeated the Bruins at the Rose Bowl since 1996. This was the first home shutout UCLA had suffered in the twenty-first century, since a 17–0 loss to California on October 16, 1999. This was the first time Stanford had achieved a road shutout against an opponent since 1974. This was the first time since 1941 that Stanford shutout UCLA.

=== Houston ===
	1	2	3	4	Total
#23 Cougars	3	0	0	10	13
Bruins	7	14	10	0	31

UCLA upset No. 23 ranked Houston in front of the home crowd in the Rose Bowl. Matt Hogan kicked a 29-yard field goal to give the Cougars the first quarter lead. Johnathan Franklin answered with an 11-yard run for a Bruins 7-3 lead. The Bruins scored two touchdowns in the second quarter. Kevin Prince ran for a 2-yard touchdown and Franklin added a 1-yard run touchdown.

In the third quarter, UCLA had a 42-yard field goal by Kai Forbath, the 2009 Lou Groza Collegiate Place-Kicker Award winner, and a touchdown again by Franklin (12 yards). Houston scored twice in the fourth quarter, on James Cleveland's 10-yard pass from quarterback Terrance Broadway and on Matt Hogan's 31-yard field goal. There were seven turnovers, including interceptions by UCLA's Rahim Moore and Akeem Ayers.

Two Houston quarterbacks, Case Keenum and Cotton Turner, were injured in the game and are out for the season.

Patrick Larimore, who had a career-high and team-high 11 tackles (10 solos), including three for loss, forced a fumble and broke up a pass in the game was named Pac-10 Conference defensive player of the week. He was also named the FWAA/Bronko Nagurski National Defensive Player of the Week.

=== Texas ===
	1	2	3	4	Total
Bruins	0	13	14	7	34
#7 Longhorns	3	0	3	6	12

Thirteen years after beating Texas on "Rout 66", the Bruins upended the No. 7 ranked Longhorns 34-12 with touchdowns by Johnathan Franklin and Kevin Prince in front of a stadium-record crowd of 101,437 in Austin, Texas. Franklin scored an 11-yard touchdown on his 118-yard day, while Prince had two touchdowns, a 38-yard run and a 1-yard pass to Ricky Marvray. Kai Forbath kicked two field goals, 39 and 49 yards, and missed one for the Bruins. The final touchdown was made by UCLA's Derrick Coleman on a 29-yard run.

Justin Tucker kicked two field goals, 31 and 34 yards, and James Kirkendoll scored on a 5-yard pass from Garrett Gilbert for Texas. Now the Bruins have beaten two teams from the State of Texas in consecutive weeks. The Longhorns turned the ball over to the Bruins five times during the contest.

=== Washington State ===
	1	2	3	4	Total
Cougars	0	14	14	0	28
Bruins	7	13	8	14	42

The Bruins came from behind to score the final three touchdowns, one by quarterback Richard Brehaut (1-yard run) and two by running back Derrick Coleman (1 and 4-yard runs) to defeat the Cougars at home.

Quarterback Brehaut played in place of injured Kevin Prince and made 12 of 23 passes for 128 yards in his first career start. Coleman had a banner game, scoring three rush touchdowns and a 73-yard long run in the fourth quarter. Franklin accounted for 216 of UCLA's 437 rushing yards, his first. Kicker Kai Forbath now has kicked 80 field goals, including the 33-yard and 20-yard field goals in this game.

Winning with 565 total offense yards, UCLA has a 38-18-1 record on Washington State.

=== California ===
	1	2	3	4	Total
Bruins	0	0	7	0	7
Golden Bears	14	14	0	7	35

Cal has a record of 8-6 coming off a bye week in Jeff Tedford's years at Cal and the Bears have beaten UCLA five consecutive times at home.

=== Oregon ===
	1	2	3	4	Total
Bruins	0	3	3	7	13
#1 Ducks	15	17	14	14	60

=== Arizona ===
	1	2	3	4	Total
#16 Wildcats	7	12	7	3	29
Bruins	7	0	7	7	21

=== Oregon State ===
	1	2	3	4	Total
Beavers	7	0	7	0	14
Bruins	7	0	7	3	17

The Bruins snapped a three-game losing streak with a 51-yard field goal by Kai Forbath with one second left in the game to give UCLA a 17-14 victory over the visiting Beavers. With 1:17 left in the game, Forbath missed a 46-yard field goal, which went wide left. Originally, the field officials had ruled that UCLA had no time left, but the challenge gave the Bruins one more second left to set up the field goal try.

Richard Brehaut scored for UCLA in the first quarter with a seven-yard run and Joe Halahuni did the same for Oregon State with a 28-yard pass from Ryan Katz.

In the third quarter, Markus Wheaton ran for 22-yard touchdown for the Beavers lead and Johnathan Franklin scored from the 1-yard line for a Bruins touchdown to tie the game.

=== Washington ===
	1	2	3	4	Total
Bruins	7	0	0	0	7
Huskies	0	7	3	14	24

=== Arizona State ===
	1	2	3	4	Total
Bruins	17	3	7	7	34
Sun Devils	7	14	17	17	55

Arizona State quarterback Brock Osweiler threw 4 touchdown passes while UCLA quarterback Richard Brehaut had three. The defeat ended UCLA's hope of a bowl game in December.

=== USC ===
	1	2	3	4	Total
Trojans	7	7	0	14	28
Bruins	7	0	0	7	14

Jonathan Franklin ran for 109 yards and one touchdown in a loss to USC. The Bruins ended the season losing six of their last seven games.

Before kickoff, fans of both teams were involved in a fight which eventually led to two participants being stabbed. Violence occurred outside Rose Bowl in 2008 as well, when nearly 50 were arrested.

== Awards and honors ==
- September 20 – UCLA linebacker Patrick Larimore, who had a career-high and team-high 11 tackles (10 solos), including three for loss, forced a fumble and broke up a pass in the upset of No. 23 Houston on September 18 was named the FWAA/Bronko Nagurski National Defensive Player of the Week and Pacific-10 Conference Defensive Player of the Week.
- September 27 – Center Ryan Taylor and linebacker Sean Westgate were named Pac-10 Players of the Week. Akeem Ayers named Lott IMPACT Player of the Week. The team was named the Tostitos Fiesta Bowl National Team of the Week for games of the weekend of Sept. 25.
- Nine Bruins received All-Pacific-10 honors: First team – Junior safety Rahim Moore and junior linebacker Akeem Ayers; Second team – Senior place kicker Kai Forbath, sophomore running back Johnathan Franklin and sophomore punter Jeff Locke; Honorable mention – Junior running back/special teams performer Derrick Coleman, junior safety Tony Dye, senior center Ryan Taylor and junior linebacker Sean Westgate.
- December 9, 2010 – Linebacker Akeem Ayers was named to the Walter Camp Football Foundation second-team All-America.

All-America teams

- Linebacker Akeem Ayers and safety Rahim Moore, Associated Press, third-team
- Punter Jeff Locke and Akeem Ayers, Sports Illustrated, honorable mention
- Akeem Ayers, Phil Steele's Magazine, second-team
- Long-snapper Christian Yount and Rahim Moore, Steele's, fourth-team All-America
- Free safety Rahim Moore, Sporting News magazine, first-team

== Coaches ==
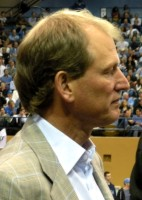
Head coach Rick Neuheisel

- Rick Neuheisel – Head coach
- Chuck Bullough – Def. coordinator
- Norm Chow – Offensive coordinator
- Frank Gansz, Jr. – Special teams
- Todd Howard – Defensive line
- Tim Hundley – Secondary
- Clark Lea – Linebackers
- Reggie Moore – Wide receivers
- Wayne Moses – Running backs
- Bob Palcic – Offensive line
- Philip Rauscher – Graduate assistant/Offense
- Daronte Jones – Graduate assistant/Defense

== Bibliography ==
- UCLA Bruins football media guide 2010 Edition (preseason information)
