= 2010 Washington State Cougars football team =

American college football season

2010 Washington State Cougars football
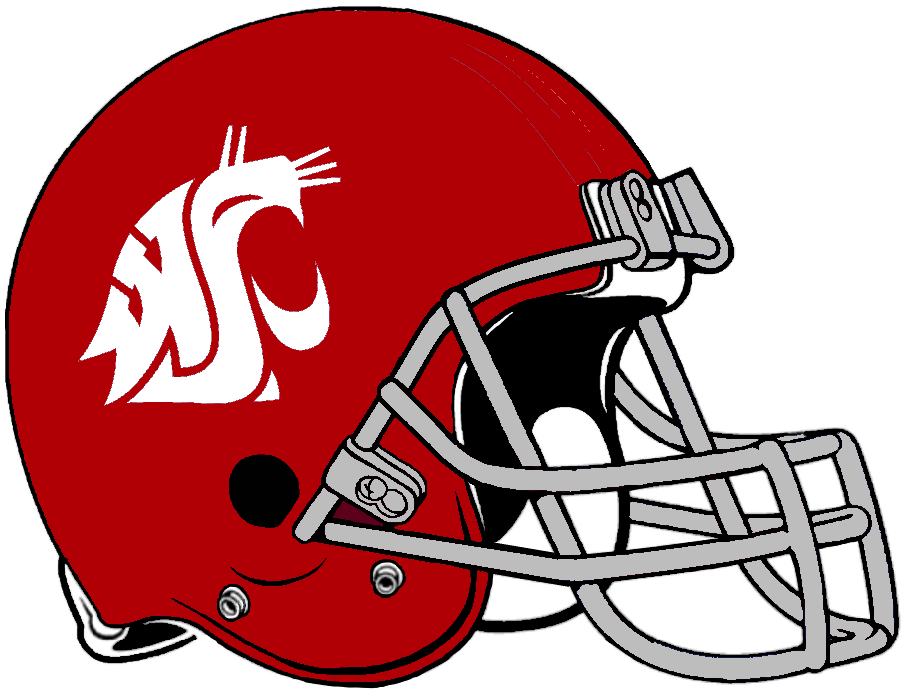
- Conference: Pacific-10 Conference
- Record: 2–10 (1–8 Pac-10)
- Head coach: Paul Wulff (3rd season)
- Offensive coordinator: Todd Sturdy (3rd season)
- Offensive scheme: Spread
- Co-defensive coordinators: Chris Ball (3rd season); Jody Sears (3rd season)
- Base defense: Multiple
- Home stadium: Martin Stadium (Capacity: 35,117)

Uniform

2010 Pacific-10 Conference football standings
	Conf.			Overall
Team	W		L	W		L
No. 3 Oregon $	9	–	0	12	–	1
No. 4 Stanford %	8	–	1	12	–	1
USC †	5	–	4	8	–	5
Washington	5	–	4	7	–	6
Arizona	4	–	5	7	–	6
Arizona State	4	–	5	6	–	6
Oregon State	4	–	5	5	–	7
California	3	–	6	5	–	7
UCLA	2	–	7	4	–	8
Washington State	1	–	8	2	–	10
$ – BCS representative as conference champion; % – BCS at-large representative; † – USC ineligible for championship and post-season due to NCAA sanctions; Rankings from AP Poll

The 2010 Washington State Cougars football team represented Washington State University in the 2010 NCAA Division I FBS football season. Head coach Paul Wulff was in his third season and they were members of the Pacific-10 Conference. The team played its home games on campus at Martin Stadium in Pullman, Washington. The Cougars finished the season 2–10 (1–8 in Pac-10, last).

== Schedule ==
Date	Time	Opponent	Site	TV	Result	Attendance	Source
September 4	4:00 p.m.	at Oklahoma State*	Boone Pickens Stadium; Stillwater, OK	FSN	L 17–65	48,692	
September 11	4:00 p.m.	No. 24 (FCS) Montana State*	Martin Stadium; Pullman, WA	FSNNW	W 23–22	26,356	
September 18	12:30 p.m.	at SMU*	Gerald J. Ford Stadium; Dallas, TX	CBSCS	L 21–35	18,184	
September 25	12:00 p.m.	No. 20 Southern California	Martin Stadium; Pullman, WA	FSNNW	L 16–50	24,310	
October 2	12:30 p.m.	at UCLA	Rose Bowl; Pasadena, CA	FSNNW	L 28–42	62,072	
October 9	2:00 p.m.	No. 3 Oregon^{†}	Martin Stadium; Pullman, WA	CSNNW	L 23–43	24,768	
October 16	4:30 p.m.	No. 17 Arizona	Martin Stadium; Pullman, WA	Versus	L 7–24	23,955	
October 23	2:00 p.m.	at No. 12 Stanford	Stanford Stadium; Stanford, CA	FCS	L 28–38	36,679	
October 30	4:00 p.m.	at Arizona State	Sun Devil Stadium; Tempe, AZ		L 0–42	44,903	
November 6	1:00 p.m.	California	Martin Stadium; Pullman, WA	FSNNW	L 13–20	17,648	
November 13	1:00 p.m.	at Oregon State	Reser Stadium; Corvallis, OR	FSNNW	W 31–14	45,389	
December 4	4:00 p.m.	Washington	Martin Stadium; Pullman, WA (Apple Cup)	Versus	L 28–35	30,157	
*Non-conference game; ^{†}Homecoming; Rankings from AP Poll released prior to the game; All times are in Pacific time

== Game summaries ==
=== Oklahoma State ===
	1	2	3	4	Total
Cougars	0	10	0	7	17
Cowboys	17	21	13	14	65

=== Montana State ===
	1	2	3	4	Total
Bobcats	6	7	9	0	22
Cougars	0	7	0	16	23

=== SMU ===
	1	2	3	4	Total
Cougars	7	7	0	7	21
Mustangs	7	7	14	7	35

=== USC ===
	1	2	3	4	Total
#20 Trojans	21	7	15	7	50
Cougars	7	6	0	3	16

=== UCLA ===
	1	2	3	4	Total
Cougars	0	14	14	0	28
Bruins	7	13	8	14	42

After scoring 21 unanswered points to lead the Bruins 28-20, the Cougars were unable to hold the lead. The Bruins came back with three touchdowns in the last half for the victory.

=== Oregon ===
	1	2	3	4	Total
#3 Ducks	15	14	7	7	43
Cougars	14	3	6	0	23

=== Arizona ===
	1	2	3	4	Total
#17 Wildcats	7	7	7	3	24
Cougars	0	0	7	0	7

=== Stanford ===
	1	2	3	4	Total
Cougars	0	7	0	21	28
#12 Cardinal	10	14	7	7	38

=== Arizona State ===
	1	2	3	4	Total
Cougars	0	0	0	0	0
Sun Devils	14	14	7	7	42

=== California ===
	1	2	3	4	Total
Golden Bears	0	7	7	6	20
Cougars	0	10	3	0	13

=== Oregon State ===
	1	2	3	4	Total
Cougars	0	14	7	10	31
Beavers	0	0	7	7	14

The Cougars came into Corvallis with a 1-9 record, and a 16-game Pac-10 losing streak. The Cougars took control of the game early, with a 14-0 lead. The Cougars would walk away with a 31-14 victory against the Beavers, ending the 16 game conference losing streak.

=== Washington ===
	1	2	3	4	Total
Huskies	7	7	7	14	35
Cougars	0	7	7	14	28
