= Shane Vereen =

American football player (born 1989)

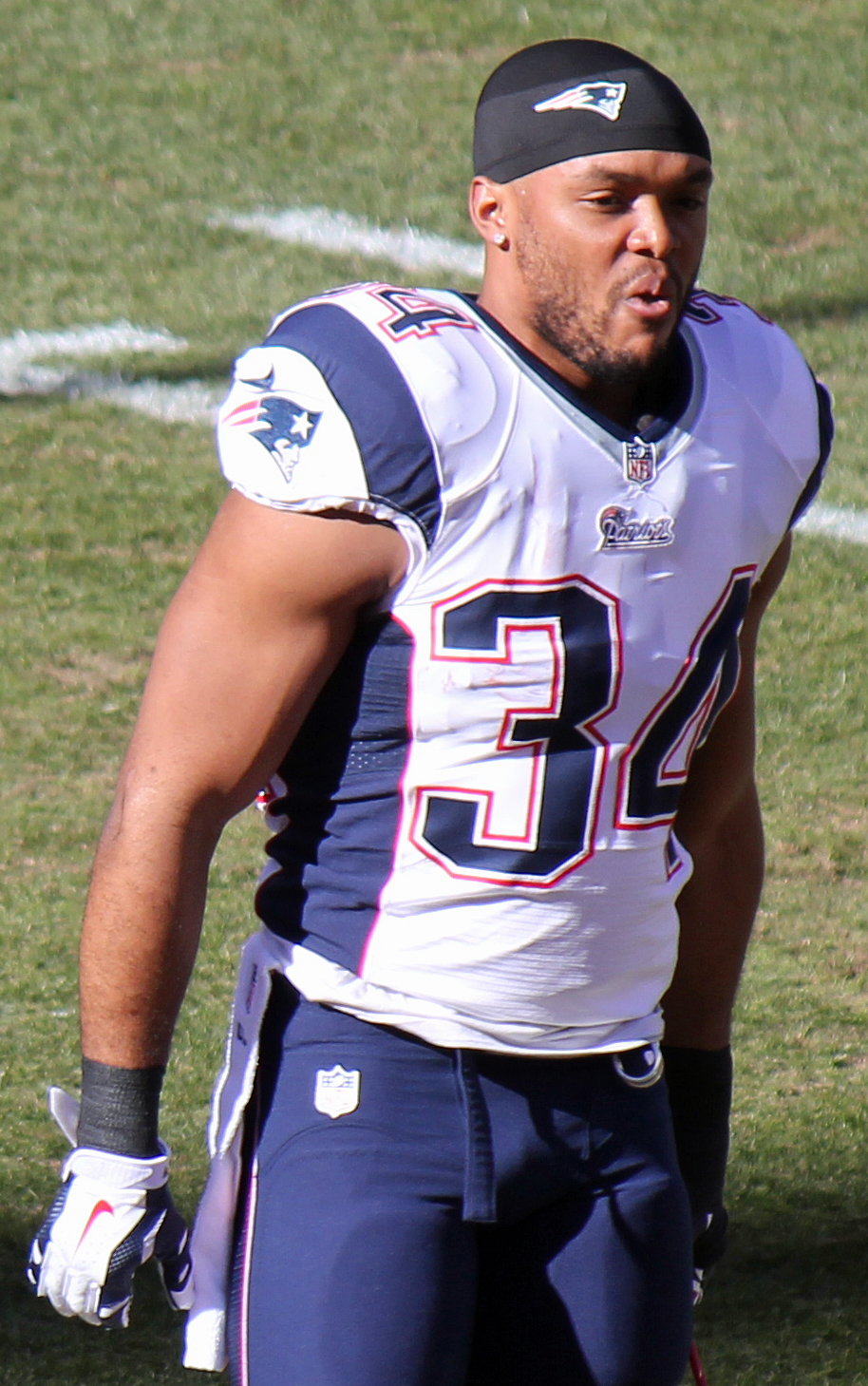
- Vereen with the New England Patriots in 2014

No. 34, 35
- Position: Running back

Personal information
- Born: March 2, 1989 (age 37); Santa Clarita, California, U.S.
- Listed height: 5 ft 10 in (1.78 m)
- Listed weight: 205 lb (93 kg)

Career information
- High school: Valencia (Santa Clarita)
- College: California (2007–2010)
- NFL draft: 2011: 2nd round, 56th overall pick

Career history
- New England Patriots (2011–2014); New York Giants (2015–2017); New Orleans Saints (2018)*
- * Offseason or practice squad member only

Awards and highlights
- Super Bowl champion (XLIX); Second-team All-Pac-10 (2010)

Career NFL statistics
- Rushing attempts: 356
- Rushing yards: 1,489
- Rushing touchdowns: 8
- Receptions: 221
- Receiving yards: 1,865
- Receiving touchdowns: 11
- Stats at Pro Football Reference

Shane Patrick-Henry Vereen (born March 2, 1989) is an American former professional football player who was a running back in the National Football League (NFL). He played college football for the California Golden Bears and was selected by the New England Patriots in the second round of the 2011 NFL draft.

== Early life ==
Vereen was born in Valencia neighborhood of Santa Clarita, California, where he attended Valencia High School. A three-year varsity football player, Vereen also played basketball and was one of the Southland's top sprinters, recording the fastest 100-meter time of any junior in Southern California during the 2006 track and field season. His best 100-meter dash time was 10.6 seconds and his best 200-meter dash time was 21.5. He graduated with a 4.0 grade point average.

== College career ==
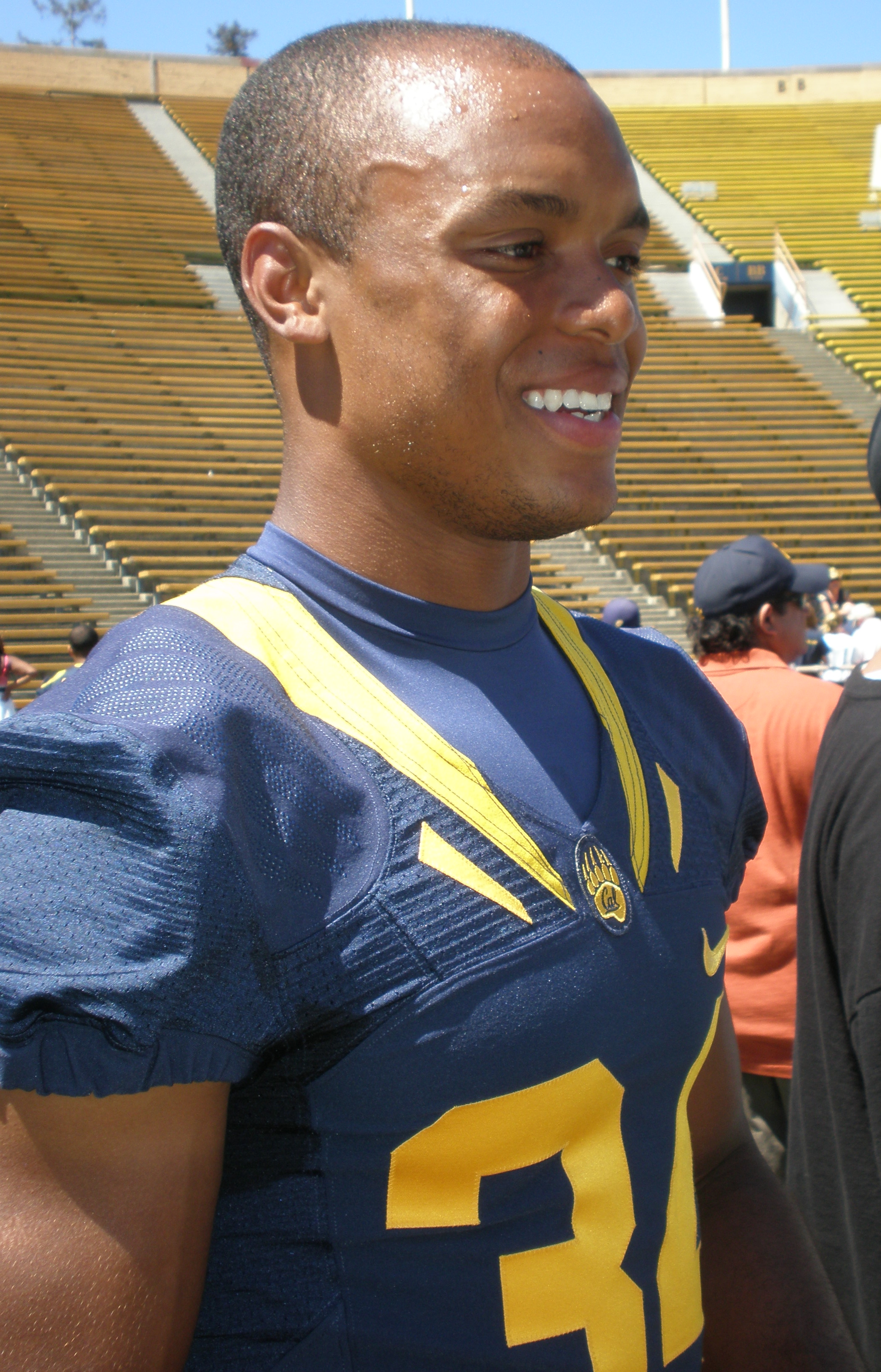
Vereen in August 2009

After being recruited to play at the University of California, Berkeley, Vereen redshirted for the 2007 season.

In 2008, he served as the primary backup to Jahvid Best as part of the Golden Bears' two running back system, playing in all of the team's 13 games. In the season opener against Michigan State, he rushed for 101 yards and a touchdown. The game marked the first time that two Cal running backs had completed over 100 yards rushing since the 2006 Holiday Bowl, with Best tallying 111 yards in the victory. For the season, he rushed for 715 yards and 4 touchdowns, along with 27 catches for 221 yards and a touchdown.

After Best suffered a severe concussion versus Oregon State, Vereen took over the job of primary running back for the final four games of the 2009 season. In the 2009 Big Game against Stanford, Vereen rushed a career-high 42 times for 193 yards and three touchdowns, helping Cal upset Stanford 34-28. For the season, Vereen rushed for 952 yards and 12 touchdowns, along with 25 receptions for 244 yards and two touchdowns. He also competed on the track team during the 2009 season in the 100 metres.

In the 2010 season opener against UC Davis on September 4, Vereen had 67 rushing yards for two touchdowns, with a third receiving in a 52–3 blowout victory. He followed this up with 60 rushing yards and one score as well as a receiving touchdown the following week against Colorado. On September 17 he had a career-high 198 rushing yards and three touchdowns as Cal fell to Nevada in Reno, and 102 rushing yards while being kept out of the end zone in a narrow loss to Arizona on September 25. On October 9, Vereen had a 151-yard rushing performance with two touchdowns against UCLA. He finished the season with 1,167 rushing yards and 13 touchdowns to go with 22 catches for 209 yards and three touchdowns.

After graduating in December 2010 in three and a half years with a degree in Media Studies, Vereen decided to forgo his senior season and declared for the NFL draft.

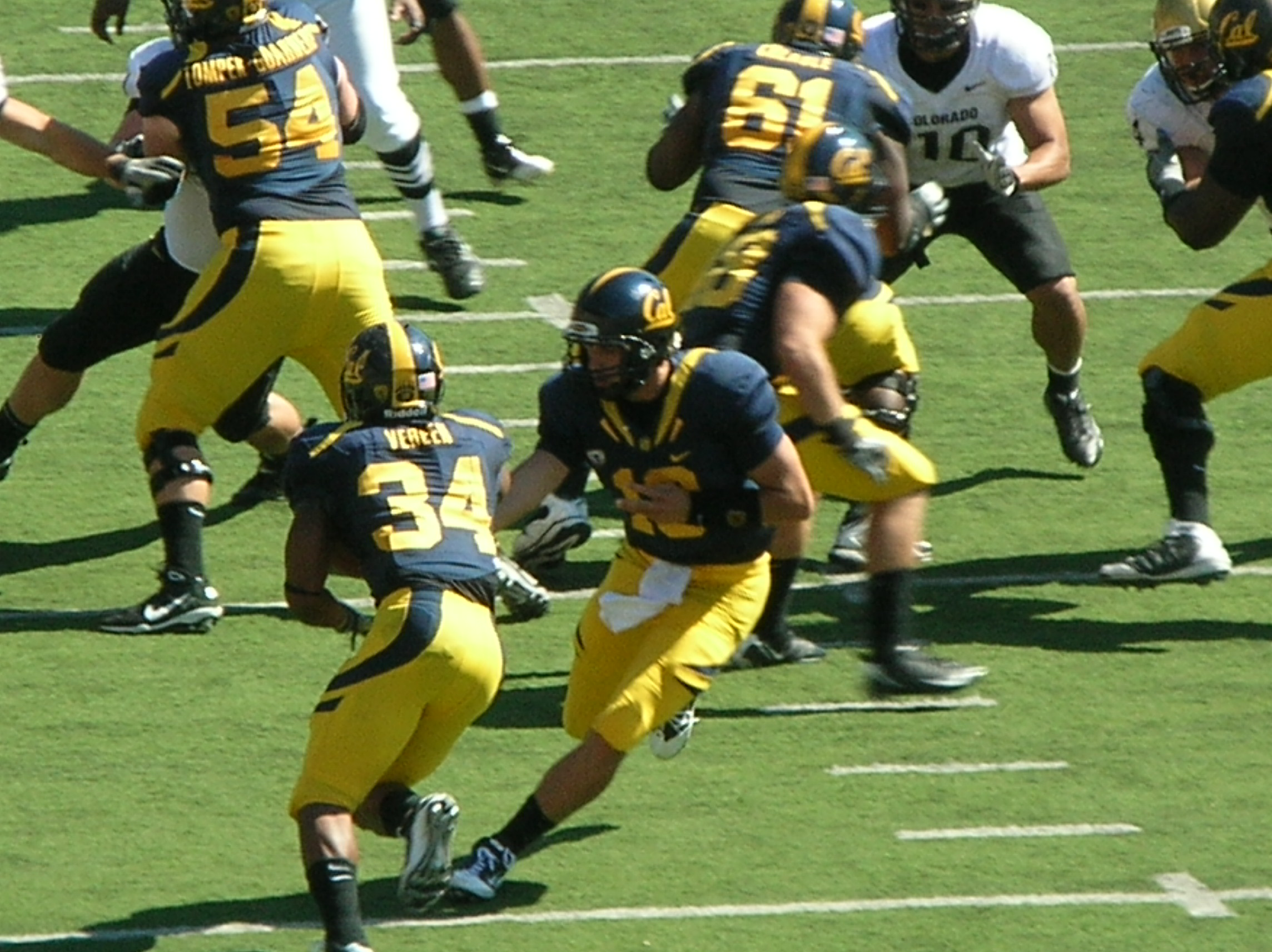
Vereen (no. 34) running the ball against Colorado in September 2010

== Professional career ==
Pre-draft measurables
Height	Weight	Arm length	Hand span	Wingspan	40-yard dash	10-yard split	20-yard split	20-yard shuttle	Three-cone drill	Vertical jump	Broad jump	Bench press
5 ft 10 1/4 in (1.78 m)	210 lb (95 kg)	30 5/8 in (0.78 m)	9 in (0.23 m)	6 ft 1 5/8 in (1.87 m)	4.55 s	1.62 s	2.66 s	4.28 s	6.95 s	34.0 in (0.86 m)	9 ft 7 in (2.92 m)	31 reps
All values from NFL Combine

=== New England Patriots ===
Vereen was selected by the New England Patriots in the second round of the 2011 NFL draft with the 56th overall pick. He was signed to a four-year contract by the Patriots on August 1, 2011. On November 21, Vereen scored his first career NFL touchdown on a four-yard run in a 34–3 win over the Kansas City Chiefs. Overall, he finished his rookie season with 57 rushing yards and a touchdown.

On November 22, 2012, Thanksgiving night, Vereen caught an 83-yard touchdown reception in a 49–19 rout of the New York Jets. The catch was the longest of his career. Overall, in the 2012 season, he finished with 251 rushing yards, three rushing touchdowns, 149 receiving yards, and one receiving touchdown. In the Divisional Round of the 2012 NFL Playoffs, against the Houston Texans, Vereen had a career day: he had five receptions for 83 yards, scoring touchdowns on two of them. He also added a third touchdown on one of his seven rushes for 41 yards. Vereen became only the second player in Patriots postseason history, joining Deion Branch, to score both a rushing touchdown and a receiving touchdown in the same postseason game. In addition, he became only the third player in NFL history, joining Roger Craig and Ricky Watters, to score two receiving touchdowns and one rushing touchdown in a postseason game. In the AFC Championship against the Baltimore Ravens, he was limited to 16 rushing yards and 22 receiving yards in the 28–13 loss to the eventual Super Bowl XLVII champions.

In Week 14 of the 2013 season, against the Cleveland Browns, he had 153 receiving yards and a rushing touchdown in the 27–26 victory. Overall, in the 2013 season, he finished with 47 receptions, 427 receiving yards, three receiving touchdowns, 208 rushing yards, and one rushing touchdown.

In the 2014 season, Vereen finished with 391 rushing yards, two rushing touchdowns, 447 receiving yards, and three receiving touchdowns. On February 1, 2015, Vereen caught a game-high 11 passes for 64 yards and won Super Bowl XLIX over the Seattle Seahawks for his first Super Bowl championship.

=== New York Giants ===
On March 10, 2015, Vereen signed with the New York Giants. In his first season with the Giants, he finished with 260 rushing yards, 495 receiving yards, and four receiving touchdowns.

On September 27, 2016, Vereen was placed on injured reserve with a triceps injury. He was activated off injured reserve on December 10, 2016, prior to Week 14 against the Dallas Cowboys. On December 20, 2016, he was placed back on injured reserve after re-injuring his triceps. In limited time due to injury in the 2016 season, he finished with 158 rushing yards, one rushing touchdown, and 94 receiving yards.

In the 2017 season, Vereen finished with 164 rushing yards and 253 receiving yards but did not record a touchdown for the first time in his career.

=== New Orleans Saints ===
On July 18, 2018, Vereen signed with the New Orleans Saints. He was placed on injured reserve on September 1, 2018, and was later released with an injury settlement.

== Career statistics ==
=== NFL ===
Legend
Won the Super Bowl

Year	Team	Games		Rushing						Receiving							Fumbles	
Year	Team	GP	GS	Att	Yds	Avg	Lng	TD	FD	Rec	Tgt	Yds	Avg	Lng	TD	FD	Fum	Lost
2011	NE	5	0	15	57	3.8	19	1	2	—	—	—	—	—	—	—	0	0
2012	NE	13	1	62	251	4.0	16	3	15	8	13	149	18.6	83	1	6	1	1
2013	NE	8	1	44	208	4.7	21	1	10	47	69	427	9.1	50	3	25	1	0
2014	NE	16	6	96	391	4.1	19	2	15	52	77	447	8.6	49	3	24	0	0
2015	NYG	16	0	61	260	4.3	39	0	13	59	81	495	8.4	37	4	23	0	0
2016	NYG	5	1	33	158	4.8	25	1	8	11	19	94	8.5	16	0	4	2	2
2017	NYG	16	0	45	164	3.6	17	0	3	44	53	253	5.8	20	0	7	0	0
Career		79	9	356	1,489	4.2	39	8	66	221	312	1,865	8.4	83	11	89	4	3

=== College ===
Season	Team	Games		Rushing					Receiving				
Season	Team	GP	GS	Att	Yds	Avg	Lng	TD	Rec	Yds	Avg	Lng	TD
2008	California	13	3	142	1,077	7.6	81	4	27	221	8.2	59	1
2009	California	13	4	183	952	5.2	61	12	25	244	9.8	21	2
2010	California	12	12	231	1,167	5.1	59	13	22	209	9.5	31	3
Total		38	19	556	3,196	5.7	81	29	74	674	9.2	59	6

== Personal life ==
His father, Henry Vereen, was a ninth round pick of the Tampa Bay Buccaneers in the 1979 NFL draft, and played wide receiver in the Canadian Football League for the BC Lions in the early 1980s. Vereen is a first cousin once removed of stage actor and dancer Ben Vereen. Shane's younger brother, Brock, played safety at the University of Minnesota and was drafted by the Chicago Bears in the fourth round of the 2014 NFL draft.
