= Ryan Murphy (American football) =

American football player (born 1992)

No. 36
- Position: Safety

Personal information
- Born: October 14, 1992 (age 34); Oakland, California, U.S.
- Listed height: 6 ft 0 in (1.83 m)
- Listed weight: 214 lb (97 kg)

Career information
- High school: Oakland (CA) Tech
- College: Oregon State
- NFL draft: 2015: 7th round, 248th overall pick

Career history
- Seattle Seahawks (2015)*; Denver Broncos (2015–2016)*; New York Giants (2016–2017); Arizona Hotshots (2019)*
- * Offseason or practice squad member only

Awards and highlights
- Super Bowl champion (50)
- Stats at Pro Football Reference

Ryan Murphy (born October 14, 1992) is an American former professional football safety. He played college football for the Oregon State Beavers, and was selected by the Seattle Seahawks in the seventh round of the 2015 NFL draft.

== Professional career ==
=== Seattle Seahawks ===
On Saturday, May 2, 2015, Murphy was selected by the Seattle Seahawks with the 248th pick in the seventh round of the 2015 NFL draft. The Seahawks waived him on September 5 as part of final roster cuts.

=== Denver Broncos ===
The Denver Broncos signed Murphy to their practice squad on November 3, 2015.

On February 7, 2016, Murphy was part of the Broncos team that won Super Bowl 50. In the game, the Broncos defeated the Carolina Panthers by a score of 24–10.

On September 3, 2016, Murphy was waived by the Broncos. The next day he was signed to the Broncos' practice squad. He was released on September 22, 2016. He was re-signed to the practice squad on November 9, 2016. He was released by the Broncos on November 23, 2016.

=== New York Giants ===
On December 27, 2016, Murphy was signed to the New York Giants' practice squad. He signed a reserve/future contract with the Giants on January 9, 2017.

On September 2, 2017, Murphy was waived by the Giants and was signed to the practice squad the next day. He then was promoted to the active roster on December 15, 2017.

On May 7, 2018, Murphy was waived by the Giants.

=== Arizona Hotshots ===
Murphy signed with the Arizona Hotshots of the Alliance of American Football in 2018, but was waived on January 8, 2019, before the start of the regular season.
