= Richard Brehaut =

American football player (born 1991)

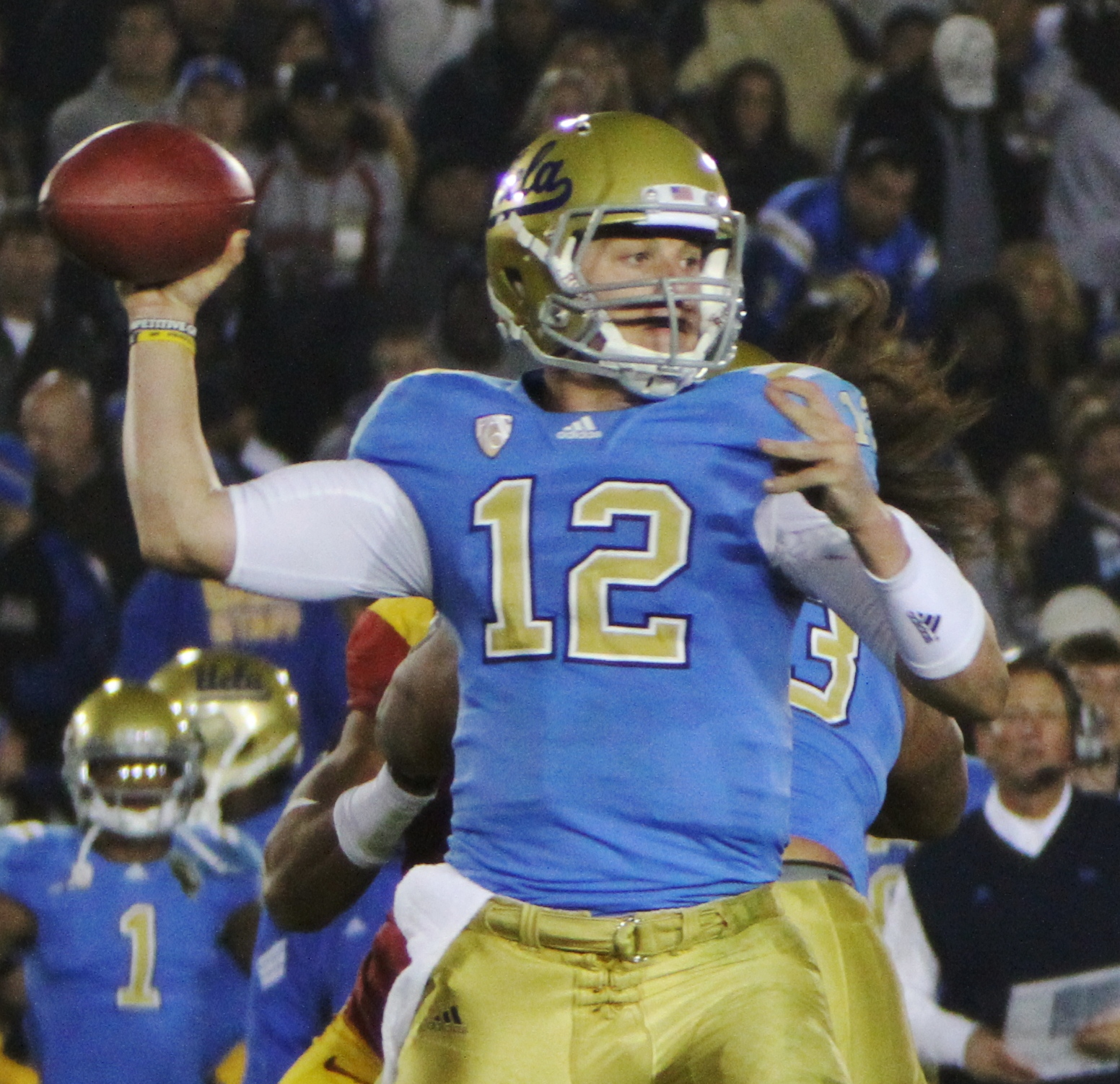
- Brehaut with UCLA in 2010

No. 12
- Position: Quarterback

Personal information
- Born: June 10, 1991 (age 35); Upland, California, U.S.
- Listed height: 6 ft 2 in (1.88 m)
- Listed weight: 222 lb (101 kg)

Career information
- High school: Los Osos (Rancho Cucamonga, California)
- College: UCLA (2009−2012)
- Stats at ESPN

Richard Daniel Brehaut (/ˈbriːhoʊ/; born June 10, 1991) is a former college football quarterback. He played college football at UCLA.

Brehaut played high school football and baseball at Los Osos High School in Rancho Cucamonga, California, where he was a member of PrepStar Dream Team (No. 15 prospect) and SuperPrep All-American. He was rated as a top ten quarterback by rivals.com, scout.com, and by ESPNU. Brehaut was named to the CIF-Southern Section Central Division first team.

In baseball, Brehaut received team MVP honors and served as captain for two years.

== College career ==
He played his first college game against the San Diego State on September 5, 2009 in the Rose Bowl, where he completed two passes for 39 yards.

On October 2, 2010, Brehaut played in place of injured Kevin Prince and made 12 of 23 passes for 128 yards in his first career start. He led the Bruins to a 42–28 victory over the Washington State Cougars at home. Brehaut had a 1-yard run touchdown in the fourth quarter.

On November 26, 2010, Brehaut was 33-for-56 for 321 yards and three touchdowns, while running another score in on the ground against Arizona State University. During this outing he also broke Troy Aikman's school record for passing attempts and completions, though it has since been broken by Mike Fafaul.

In 2011, Brehaut joined the UCLA baseball team as a catcher. During the football season in the October game against Washington State at the Rose Bowl, he broke his left leg while running with the ball in the second quarter. Prior to this game, he started four of the Bruins’ first six games, passing for 907 yards and six touchdowns without an interception.

== See also ==
- 2009 UCLA Bruins football team
- 2010 UCLA Bruins football team
