= Kevin Prince (American football) =

American football player (born 1989)

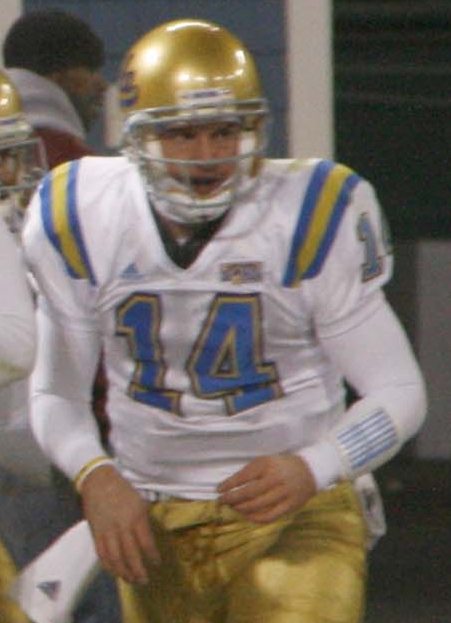
- Prince at the 2009 EagleBank Bowl

No. 4
- Position: Quarterback

Personal information
- Born: November 28, 1989 (age 36); Los Angeles, California, U.S.
- Listed height: 6 ft 2 in (1.88 m)
- Listed weight: 230 lb (104 kg)

Career information
- High school: Encino (CA) Crespi
- College: UCLA (2008−2012)

Awards and highlights
- 2009 EagleBank Bowl Champion; Pac-12 South Division Champions (2011, 2012); NFLPA Collegiate Bowl (2012)

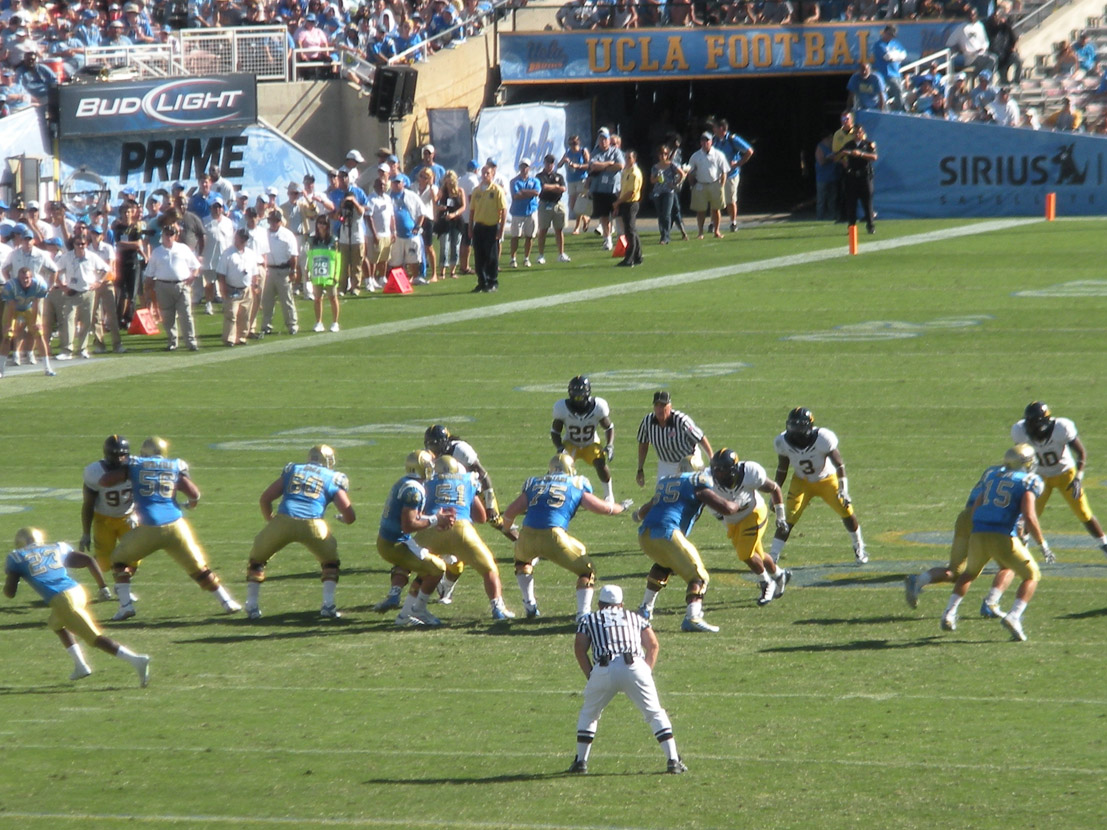
Quarterback Kevin Prince looks to pass during the 2009 Cal-UCLA game at the Rose Bowl

Kevin Christopher Prince (born November 28, 1989) is an American former football quarterback. He played at Crespi Carmelite High School in Encino, California. He played college football at UCLA.

Prince was selected by head coach Rick Neuheisel to start the 2009 season opener in the Rose Bowl against San Diego State and won the game 33–14. In that game, he completed 18 of 29 passes for 176 yards and threw 1 interception.

== College career ==
2009

As a freshman, Prince started 11 games and threw for 2,050 yards on the year. He became just the second UCLA quarterback to pass for over 300 yards in three games during the year and is second in many freshman records at UCLA, mostly behind Tommy Maddox. He injured his shoulder in the 2009 EagleBank Bowl.

2010

Prince was team captain for the 2010 season. On September 25, 2010, Prince led the Bruins to an upset victory over then-No. 7 ranked Texas Longhorns 34–12 in front of more than 101,430 fans in Austin, Texas. Previous week, the Bruins were victorious over then-No. 23 Houston Cougars 31–13 at home. He reinjured his shoulder aggravated the previous season and missed 2 games. He then injured his knee and only started 5 games and passed for 384 yards.

2011

Prince finished the 2011 season with 1,828 yards passing with 12 touchdowns and 8 interceptions. He started 10 games but was injured in one of them and missed two games with an injury as well.

2012

Prince had an injury plagued 2012 summer and eventually was outperformed in fall practice by freshman Brett Hundley. He only attempted 4 passes on the year and graduated later that year, thus ending his football career.

== Personal life ==
Kevin's father is a dentist, who graduated from UCLA. Prince was raised a Mormon, but did not go on a mission. He has since left the church and attends the Church at Nolensville in Nolensville, TN a Southern Baptist church. He married former UCLA gymnast Tauny Frattone in 2013, he had one son in 2014 and later another son in 2017.
