= 2010 Utah Utes football team =

American college football season

2010 Utah Utes football

Maaco Bowl Las Vegas, L 3–26 vs. Boise State
- Conference: Mountain West Conference

Ranking
- Coaches: No. 23
- Record: 10–3 (7–1 MW)
- Head coach: Kyle Whittingham (6th season)
- Co-offensive coordinators: Dave Schramm (2nd season); Aaron Roderick (1st season)
- Offensive scheme: Spread
- Defensive coordinator: Kalani Sitake (2nd season)
- Base defense: 4–3
- Captains: Matt Asiata; Christian Cox; Sealver Siliga; Zane Taylor
- Home stadium: Rice-Eccles Stadium

2010 Mountain West Conference football standings
	Conf.			Overall
Team	W		L	W		L
No. 2 TCU $	8	–	0	13	–	0
Utah	7	–	1	10	–	3
Air Force	5	–	3	9	–	4
San Diego State	5	–	3	9	–	4
BYU	5	–	3	7	–	6
Colorado State	2	–	6	3	–	9
UNLV	2	–	6	2	–	11
Wyoming	1	–	7	3	–	9
New Mexico	1	–	7	1	–	11
$ – Conference champion and BCS representative as top non-AQ school to meet automatic qualification criteria; As of January 11, 2011; Rankings from AP Poll

The 2010 Utah Utes football team represented the University of Utah during the 2010 NCAA Division I FBS football season. The team was coached by sixth year head coach Kyle Whittingham and played their homes game in Rice-Eccles Stadium in Salt Lake City, Utah. They were members of the Mountain West Conference. 2010 was the Utes' final year in the Mountain West, as they began play in the Pac-12 in 2011.

== Schedule ==
Date	Time	Opponent	Rank	Site	TV	Result	Attendance
September 2	6:30 p.m.	No. 15 Pittsburgh*		Rice-Eccles Stadium; Salt Lake City, UT	Versus	W 27–24 ^{OT}	45,730
September 11	2:00 p.m.	UNLV	No. 20	Rice-Eccles Stadium; Salt Lake City, UT	the mtn.	W 38–10	45,102
September 18	6:00 p.m.	at New Mexico	No. 14	University Stadium; Albuquerque, NM	the mtn.	W 56–14	23,940
September 25	6:00 p.m.	San Jose State*^{†}	No. 13	Rice-Eccles Stadium; Salt Lake City, UT		W 56–3	45,099
October 9	5:00 p.m.	at Iowa State*	No. 10	Jack Trice Stadium; Ames, IA	FCS	W 68–27	43,195
October 16	4:00 p.m.	at Wyoming	No. 11	War Memorial Stadium; Laramie, WY	the mtn.	W 30–6	20,014
October 23	4:00 p.m.	Colorado State	No. 9	Rice-Eccles Stadium; Salt Lake City, UT	the mtn.	W 59–6	45,029
October 30	5:30 p.m.	at Air Force	No. 8	Falcon Stadium; Colorado Springs, CO	CBSCS	W 28–23	37,211
November 6	1:30 p.m.	No. 4 TCU	No. 6	Rice-Eccles Stadium; Salt Lake City, UT (College GameDay)	CBSCS	L 7–47	46,522
November 13	12:30 p.m.	at Notre Dame*	No. 15	Notre Dame Stadium; Notre Dame, IN	NBC	L 3–28	80,795
November 20	8:00 p.m.	at San Diego State	No. 25	Qualcomm Stadium; San Diego, CA	the mtn.	W 38–34	34,951
November 27	1:30 p.m.	BYU	No. 23	Rice-Eccles Stadium; Salt Lake City, UT (Holy War)	the mtn.	W 17–16	45,272
December 22	6:00 p.m.	vs. No. 10 Boise State*	No. 20	Sam Boyd Stadium; Whitney, NV (Maaco Bowl Las Vegas)	ESPN	L 3–26	41,923
*Non-conference game; ^{†}Homecoming; Rankings from AP Poll released prior to the game; All times are in Mountain time

== Rankings ==
Ranking movements Legend: ██ Increase in ranking ██ Decrease in ranking RV = Received votes
	Week															
Poll	Pre	1	2	3	4	5	6	7	8	9	10	11	12	13	14	Final
AP	RV	20	14	13	13	10	11	9	8	6	15	25	23	21	20	RV
Coaches	24	20	14	13	12	10	10	9	7	6	15	24	22	21	19	23
Harris	Not released						10	9	7	6	15	21	20	21	19	Not released
BCS	Not released							9	8	5	14	23	20	20	19	Not released

== Preseason ==
In the preseason Coaches' Poll, Utah was ranked No. 24 (tied). In the preseason AP Poll, Utah received votes, but not enough to make the top 25 list. The Mountain West Conference media picked Utah to finish second in conference. TCU was the unanimous choice to finish first in conference and received all 31 votes for first place. BYU was picked to finish third and Air Force was picked to finish fourth.

=== Recruiting ===
Rivals.com named Utah's 2010 recruiting class the best in the Mountain West Conference. The complete list is available below:

College recruiting information (2010)
Name	Hometown	School	Height	Weight	40^{‡}	Commit date
Dres Anderson; WR	Riverside, CA	J.W. North	6 ft 1 in (1.85 m)	170 lb (77 kg)	4.6	Jul 10, 2009
Dres Anderson; WR	Recruit ratings: Scout: Rivals: (77)					
Brian Blechen; QB	Moorpark, CA	Moorpark	6 ft 3 in (1.91 m)	205 lb (93 kg)	4.6	Jun 19, 2009
Brian Blechen; QB	Recruit ratings: Scout: Rivals: (78)					
Zach Bolton; OL	Houston, TX	Klein Forest	6 ft 3 in (1.91 m)	265 lb (120 kg)	4.85	Jan 26, 2010
Zach Bolton; OL	Recruit ratings: Scout: Rivals: (76)					
Princeton Collins; RB	Round Rock, TX	Westwood	6 ft 0 in (1.83 m)	185 lb (84 kg)	4.55	Jun 4, 2009
Princeton Collins; RB	Recruit ratings: Scout: Rivals: (76)					
John Cullen; OL	Fullerton, CA	Fullerton C.C.	6 ft 6 in (1.98 m)	280 lb (130 kg)	5.3	Feb 3, 2010
John Cullen; OL	Recruit ratings: Scout: Rivals: (N/A)					
V.J. Fehoko; LB	Honolulu, HI	Farrington	5 ft 11 in (1.80 m)	213 lb (97 kg)	4.77	Feb 3, 2010
V.J. Fehoko; LB	Recruit ratings: Scout: Rivals: (78)					
Wykie Freeman; DB	Pasadena, TX	Pasadena Memorial	5 ft 10 in (1.78 m)	160 lb (73 kg)	4.4	Jan 18, 2010
Wykie Freeman; DB	Recruit ratings: Scout: Rivals: (40)					
Jacoby Hale; LB	Beaumont, TX	Central	6 ft 1 in (1.85 m)	197 lb (89 kg)	4.5	Mar 11, 2009
Jacoby Hale; LB	Recruit ratings: Scout: Rivals: (74)					
Joe Kruger; DE	Orem, UT	Pleasant Grove	6 ft 7 in (2.01 m)	231 lb (105 kg)	4.9	Nov 18, 2008
Joe Kruger; DE	Recruit ratings: Scout: Rivals: (76)					
Ofa Latu; LB	Provo, UT	Timpview	6 ft 1 in (1.85 m)	200 lb (91 kg)		Jan 26, 2010
Ofa Latu; LB	Recruit ratings: Scout: Rivals: (40)					
Martavious Lee; WR	San Marcos, CA	Palomar C.C	6 ft 2 in (1.88 m)	180 lb (82 kg)	4.4	Mar 26, 2010
Martavious Lee; WR	Recruit ratings: Scout: (N/A)					
Star Lotulelei; DE	Ephraim, UT	Snow College	6 ft 4 in (1.93 m)	287 lb (130 kg)	4.9	Jul 24, 2009
Star Lotulelei; DE	Recruit ratings: Scout: Rivals: (N/A)					
Damian Payne; DB	Klein, TX	Klein Fores	6 ft 0 in (1.83 m)	186 lb (84 kg)	4.4	Aug 4, 2009
Damian Payne; DB	Recruit ratings: Scout: Rivals: (78)					
Lucky Radley; S	Woodland Hills, CA	Taft	5 ft 9 in (1.75 m)	184 lb (83 kg)	4.4	Feb 3, 2010
Lucky Radley; S	Recruit ratings: Scout: Rivals: (74)					
Terrell Reese; WR	Brenham, TX	Brenham	6 ft 1 in (1.85 m)	180 lb (82 kg)	4.5	Jun 3, 2009
Terrell Reese; WR	Recruit ratings: Scout: Rivals: (74)					
Kenneth Scott; WR	Ontario, CA	Colony	6 ft 2 in (1.88 m)	196 lb (89 kg)	4.6	Jul 9, 2009
Kenneth Scott; WR	Recruit ratings: Scout: Rivals: (76)					
Tyler Shreve; QB	Redlands, CA	East Valley	6 ft 4 in (1.93 m)	212 lb (96 kg)	4.85	Jan 20, 2010
Tyler Shreve; QB	Recruit ratings: Scout: Rivals: (78)					
Joseph Smith; CB	Norco, CA	Norco	5 ft 10 in (1.78 m)	188 lb (85 kg)	4.5	Jun 29, 2009
Joseph Smith; CB	Recruit ratings: Scout: Rivals: (74)					
Sefa Tanoai; DE	Pleasant Grove, UT	Pleasant Grove	6 ft 4 in (1.93 m)	267 lb (121 kg)	4.8	Dec 28, 2009
Sefa Tanoai; DE	Recruit ratings: Scout: Rivals: (73)					
Ron Tongaonevai; OL	Ephraim, UT	Snow College	6 ft 2 in (1.88 m)	342 lb (155 kg)		Feb 4, 2010
Ron Tongaonevai; OL	Recruit ratings: Rivals: (N/A)					
Sione Tupouata; DE	Oakland, CA	Fremont	6 ft 4 in (1.93 m)	250 lb (110 kg)	4.8	Jan 27, 2010
Sione Tupouata; DE	Recruit ratings: Scout: Rivals: (74)					
Michael Walker; DB	Brenham, TX	Brenham	5 ft 11 in (1.80 m)	170 lb (77 kg)	4.4	Dec 15, 2009
Michael Walker; DB	Recruit ratings: Scout: Rivals: (40)					
Overall recruit ranking: Scout: 50 Rivals: 32
‡ Refers to 40-yard dash; Note: In many cases, Scout, Rivals, 247Sports, On3, and ESPN may conflict in their listings of height, weight and 40 time.; In these cases, the average was taken. ESPN grades are on a 100-point scale.; Sources: "Utah Commit List 2010". Rivals.; "Scout.com Football Recruiting: Utah". Scout.; "Utah Utes Football Recruiting 2010 – ESPN". ESPN.; "Scout.com Team Recruiting Rankings". Scout.; "2010 Team Ranking". Rivals.com.

=== Coaching changes ===
During the offseason, Kyle Whittingham made several changes to his coaching staff. J.D. Williams, the cornerback coach in 2008, left the team, leaving an open position on Whittingham's staff. Whittingham hired Brian Johnson, the 2009 Sugar Bowl MVP, as the new quarterback coach. Johnson replaced Dave Schramm as quarterback coach. Schramm will now be the tight end coach and the co-offensive coordinator. Aaron Roderick will join Schramm as co-offensive coordinator and will continue his duties as wide receiver coach. Jay Hill will replace Williams as cornerback coach.

=== Preseason player awards ===
==== MWC All-Preseaon team ====
Utah had four players named to the Mountain West Conference's All-Preseason team. Three of the players are on the offense and one is on the defense. The players named are running back Eddie Wide, Caleb Schlauderaff and Zane Taylor from the Offensive line, and defensive back Brandon Burton.

==== Watch lists ====
Two Utes were named to the 2010 Outland Trophy Watch List: guard Caleb Schlauderaff and center Zane Taylor. The Football Writers Association of America votes on the Outland Trophy, which goes to college football's best interior lineman each year. The 2010 award winner will be announced on December 9, 2010.

Cornerback Brandon Burton was named to the Jim Thorpe Award Watch List. The Jim Thorpe Association awards the Jim Thorpe Award each year to the player it votes as college football's best defensive back.

Wide receiver Shaky Smithson was named to the Paul Hornung Award Watch List. The award, in its first year, will be awarded to the college player that it deems the most versatile.

Placekicker Joe Phillips was named to the Lou Groza Award Watch List. The Lou Groza Award goes to the top placekicker in college football. It is named for Lou Groza who played 21 season in the NFL and graduated from Ohio State.

Running back Eddie Wide was named a candidate for the Doak Walker Award. The award goes to the nation's top running back.

=== Pac-12 ===
During the offseason, Utah successfully negotiated with the Pacific-10 Conference (Pac-10) to join the conference for all conference sports. Colorado also agreed to join the Pac-10, which increased the number of schools in the conference to 12. Once Colorado and Utah officially joined the conference, the conference changed its name to the "Pac-12 Conference" (Pac-12). The Utes football team began playing in the Pac-12 during the 2011 season. Consequently, the 2010 season was the last season Utah played in the Mountain West Conference.

The formal announcement was made on June 17, 2010, in a ceremony at Rice-Eccles Stadium. The ceremony included Pac-10 commissioner Larry Scott, Utah Athletic Director Chris Hill, University of Utah President Michael K. Young, and Utah Governor Gary Herbert, among other dignitaries.

== Game summaries ==
=== Pittsburgh ===
	1	2	3	4	OT	Total
#15 Panthers	0	7	3	14	0	24
Utes	0	14	3	7	3	27

Utah leads series: 2 – 0 – 0

Utah defeated Pittsburgh 27–24 in overtime on September 2. Placekicker Joe Phillips successfully kicked a 21-yard field goal to secure the victory. The game matched Utah, from the Mountain West Conference (MWC), against Pittsburgh, from the Big East Conference in the season's first game for both teams. This was the second meeting between these two teams. The previous time they met was in the 2005 Fiesta Bowl, a game Utah won 35–7 to complete Utah's 2004 undefeated season. Utah entered this game with a 17-game home winning streak and a 7–0 record against the teams that are currently in the Big East Conference.

Pittsburgh scored first in the game after Shaky Smithson fumbled a punt on the 28-yard line to give Pittsburgh possession of the ball. Five plays later, Pittsburgh scored a touchdown when Dion Lewis rushed three yards for the score. On its next possession, Utah responded with an 11-play scoring drive. Wide receiver Jereme Brooks scored a touchdown with a 19-yard reception from Sophomore quarterback Jordan Wynn. Utah scored another touchdown before halftime to take a 14–7 lead on a 3-yard pass from Wynn to Brooks.

The teams traded field goals in the third quarter to bring the score to 17–10. A few minutes into the fourth quarter, Pittsburgh scored another field goal to narrow the score to 17–13. The Utes scored a touchdown on their next possession when Wynn completed a pass to DeVonte Christopher for a 61-yard scoring strike and a 24–13 lead with 7:59 remaining in regulation. Just 48 seconds later, the Panthers responded with a touchdown on a 44-yard pass from Tino Sunseri to Jon Baldwin. Pittsburgh then scored a two-point conversion off another pass from Sunseri to Baldwin, to narrow the score to 24–21. On Utah's ensuing possession, it was unable to use the rest of the remaining time. When Pittsburgh took over, it moved the ball to the 13-yard line. From there, Dan Hutchins kicked a 30-yard field goal with no time left in regulation to tie the game at 24–24.

In overtime, Pittsburgh took possession of the ball first. On the first overtime play from scrimmage, Safety Brian Blechen intercepted a Sunseri pass to end Pittsburgh's overtime possession. During Utah's possession, Utah ran 6 straight run plays to move the ball to the 4-yard line. From there Phillips hit the 21-yard field goal for the victory. Utah won its first season opener against a team ranked in the AP Poll with the defeat of the No. 15 ranked Panthers.

After the game, the MWC named two Utah players as its "Players of the Week". Sophomore wide receiver DeVonte Christopher was named the offensive player of the week. Christopher had 8 catches for 155 yards and a touchdown. He averaged 19.4 yards per reception. Freshman Brian Blechen was named defensive player of the week. In addition to his interception in overtime, Blechen had five tackles, including two solo tackles.

=== UNLV ===
	1	2	3	4	Total
Rebels	3	0	7	0	10
#20 Utes	3	14	14	7	38

Utah leads series: 14 – 2 – 0

Utah entered the game with an 18-game home winning streak and a perfect record against UNLV in Salt Lake City. UNLV's two wins in the series were in 2007 and 1979. During this September 11 game, the Utes continued their winning ways with a 38–10 defeat of the Rebels to push their home winning streak to 19 games and their record for the year to 2–0 (1–0 MWC). UNLV dropped to 0–2 (0–1 MWC) and has an 0–8 record against the Utes in Salt Lake City.

Backup quarterback Terrance Cain started the game for the Utes; starting quarterback Jordan Wynn sat the game out with a thumb injury. Cain had started 8 games during the 2009 season before being replaced by Wynn. Cain completed 13 of his 20 pass attempts during the game. He had two touchdowns, no interceptions, and threw for 207 yards total.

After UNLV tied the game at 3–3, Utah responded with 21 straight points. Eddie Wide scored a touchdown on a 3-yard rush. Wide helped the team again with 37 seconds remaining in the half. On a Utah punt, wide forced a fumble and then was able to recover the ball on UNLV's 20-yard line. On the next play, Jereme Brooks caught a pass from Cain to take a 17–3 halftime lead.

Antoine "Shaky" Smithson had two touchdowns during the game, which was an improvement over his game against Pittsburgh in which he had two fumbles. His first touchdown was a 55-yard reception from Terrance Cain. His second touchdown was a 77-yard punt return. Both scores occurred during the third quarter. After the game, the Mountain West Conference named Smithson as its special teams player of the week. He fielded a total of five punts for 128 yards or 25.6 yards per return.

=== New Mexico ===
	1	2	3	4	Total
#14 Utes	7	14	28	7	56
Lobos	0	0	14	0	14

Utah leads series: 33 – 17 – 2

Entering the game, Utah held a lead of 13–12–1 for games played in Albuquerque, New Mexico. Utah had won the last three meetings. In this September 18 game, Utah defeated New Mexico 56–14 to improve to 3–0 (2–0 MWC). New Mexico dropped to 0–3 (0–1 MWC).

Utah had three turnovers compared to New Mexico's one, but still managed to win decisively. Utah's first possession ended with a fumble by running back Eddie Wide. Utah's second possession almost had a similar end when running back Matt Asiata fumbled on the one-yard line, but the ball was recovered by Utah tight end Brad Clifford. Two plays later, Utah had the first score of the game when Asiata rushed for a one-yard touchdown.

One of New Mexico's two scores was on another Utah fumble. The first play from scrimmage after half time was a completed pass from Terrance Cain to receiver Luke Matthews. Matthews was hit by cornerback Anthony Hooks forcing the fumble. Safety A.J. Butler then returned the ball 27 yards for New Mexico's first score of the night, to narrow the game to 21–7. 40 seconds later, Utah responded with a 75-yard touchdown reception from Cain to Jereme Brooks. One minute after that, Utah linebacker Matt Martinez intercepted quarterback Tarean Austin's pass and returned it 36 yards for a touchdown.

For the second consecutive game, Antoine "Shaky" Smithson returned a punt for a touchdown. With 9:48 remaining in the third quarter, Smithson scored a touchdown off of a 73-yard punt return. After the game, the MWC named Smithson as its Special Teams Player of the Week. Smithson returned a total of four punts for 140 yards or 35.0 yards per return. Cornerback Lamar Chapman was named as the MWC Defensive Player of the Week. Chapman had 8 tackles, including 7 solo tackles, 2 tackles for a loss, and one sack.

=== San Jose State ===
	1	2	3	4	Total
Spartans	3	0	0	0	3
#13 Utes	7	28	7	14	56

Utah leads series: 6 – 1 – 0

On September 25, Utah defeated San Jose State to improve to 4–0 (2–0 MWC) and drop San Jose State to 1–3 (0–0 WAC). Utah entered the game with a 19 games winning streak at home. This was the second time Utah played San Jose State as its homecoming opponent. The previous time, San Jose State won 24–6 in 1974.

Jordan Wynn returned as Utah's starting quarterback after missing the two previous games with a thumb injury. He helped Utah have its largest margin of victory since a defeat of UTEP by the same score in 1997. Utah had no turnovers and one five-yard penalty during the game.

Utah scored on its first play from scrimmage when Reggie Dunn ran 43 yards for a touchdown on a reverse play. On the ensuing kickoff, Brandon Diver returned the ball 71 yards. Several plays later, the Spartans scored their only points of the game when Waid Harrison scored a 20-yard field goal.

During the second quarter, Utah scored 4 touchdowns to take a 28–3 lead at the half. Two of the scores followed San Jose State punting mistakes. On 4th and 6 from their own 32-yard line, Spartan's quarterback Jordan La Secla punted the ball into the back of his own lineman. Reggie Topps returned the ball 10 yards for a touchdown. On San Jose's next possession, punter Jens Alvernik's punt was blocked by Mike Honeycutt. The ball went out-of-bounds at the San Jose State 24-yard line, for no net gain on the punt. Three plays later, Eddie Wide rushed 8 yards for a touchdown.

Utah scored three touchdowns during the second half to reach 56 points. Matt Asiata, Tauni Vakapauna, and Beau Burton, respectively, scored on rushing touchdowns.

=== Iowa State ===
	1	2	3	4	Total
#10 Utes	10	31	17	10	68
Cyclones	14	0	6	7	27

Utah trails series: 1 – 4 – 0

In this October 9 game, Utah defeated Iowa State 68–27 to improve to 5–0 (2–0 MWC) and drop the Cyclones to 3–3 (1–1 Big 12). Utah had 593 yards of total offense, 168 yards on kick returns, 156 yards on punt returns, and 109 yards on interception returns. Altogether, Utah amassed 1,026 yards. The 68 points Utah scored was the most Iowa State had ever allowed at home. Utah had a bye the week preceding the Iowa State game. Entering the game, Kyle Whittingham's teams were 5–0 in games following bye weeks. These two teams had met four time before, all in the 1970s. The teams met in 1970, 1972, 1975, and 1976 with Iowa State winning all four games.

At the end of the first quarter, Iowa State led 14–10 after capitalizing on two Utah turnovers. Utah scored 31 points in the second quarter to take the lead for good in the game. Those scores came from a number of different Utes. Shaky Smithson took the ball on a reverse play and then threw a 53-yard touchdown to DeVonte Christopher. Matt Asiata and Eddie Wide scored on rushes of 1 yard and 2 yards, respectively. Smithson scored when he caught a 61-yard pass from quarterback Jordan Wynn. Cornerback Brandon Burton intercepted a pass from Austen Arnaud and returned the ball to the Iowa State 8-yard line. With only 1 second remaining before the half, Utah then immediately kicked a field goal; Joe Phillips successfully connected on a 25-yard attempt to give Utah 41–14 halftime lead.

After halftime, another Phillips field goal pushed Utah's lead to 44–14. Iowa State then responded with a 4-play, 65-yard touchdown drive. Collin Franklin caught a 36-yard pass from Austen Arnaud to score the touchdown, but Utah blocked the extra point attempt. Utah scored on the ensuing kickoff when Reggie Dunn returned the kickoff 100-yards for a touchdown. Eddie Wide scored one more touchdown in the third quarter off of a 5-yard rush to make the score 58–20 entering the fourth quarter.

Joe Phillips scored one more field goal in the fourth quarter on a 33-yard attempt. Backup running back Sausan Shakerin scored Utah's last score to make the score 68–20. Iowa State responded with a touchdown drive for the final score of the evening. Iowa State's backup quarterback James Capello scored on a 19-yard rush.

After the game, two Utah players were named as Mountain West Conference Players of the Week. Quarterback Jordan Wynn was named as Offensive Player of the Week. Wynn completed 23 of 31 passes for 325 yards and two touchdowns. Shaky Smithson was named as Special Teams player of the Week. Smithson returned five punts for 145 yards and an average of 29.0 yards per punt return. Smithson had his longest punt return of the season with a 78-yard return to the 2-yard line. He also returned two kickoffs for 41 yards and had a 61-yard touchdown reception. Smithson had a total of 261 all purpose yards during the game.

=== Wyoming ===
	1	2	3	4	Total
#11 Utes	7	16	7	0	30
Cowboys	0	0	0	6	6

Utah leads series: 51 – 31 – 1

Utah defeated Wyoming on October 16 to improve to 6–0 (3–0 MWC). Wyoming dropped to 2–5 (0–3 MWC). Entering the game, this was the longest running series Utah had played with an out of state school. It ranked as the third most played, behind Utah State and BYU.

Utah won the game despite having three turnovers and having an extra point blocked while forcing no turnovers from Wyoming. All three turnovers were interceptions of quarterback Jordan Wynn. Wynn completed 16 out of 25 passes for 230 yards and had two touchdown passes. The first touchdown pass game during the first quarter when Wynn connected with receiver Luke Matthews for a 45-yard reception. The second one was during the second quarter when DeVonte Christopher caught a 16-yard pass.

While placekicker Joe Phillips had an extra point during the second quarter, he did make his only field goal attempt. Phillips connected on a 48-yard field goal in the second quarter to make the score 10–0. The kick was Phillips 17th consecutive successful field goal.

=== Colorado State ===
	1	2	3	4	Total
Rams	0	6	0	0	6
#9 Utes	7	17	21	14	59

Utah leads series: 55 – 22 – 2

The Utes defeated the Rams 59–6, on October 23, to improve their record to 7–0 (4–0 MWC) and drop Colorado State to 2–6 (1–3 MWC). Entering the game, Utah had a 20-game home winning streak. This was the 79th meeting of these two teams, which has been the fourth longest series for Utah.

Utah gained 648 yards of offense, which was the fifth highest total in school history, as Utah won its 21st consecutive home game, a MWC record. The defense forced two turnovers during the second half to help extend Utah's 24–6 halftime lead. Utah did not allow any second half points and forced two Colorado State turnovers: in the third quarter, Derrick Shelby caused a fumble as he sacked quarterback Pete Thomas, and in the fourth quarter, Conroy Black intercepted a Thomas pass. Both turnovers lead to Utah touchdowns. The 53 point margin of victory, was Utah's largest over Colorado State since 1955.

For his performance against Colorado State, the MWC named Jordan Wynn as a Co-offensive Player of the Week. Wynn completed 23 out of 29 passes for 321 yards and three touchdowns. Wynn played less than three quarters of the game.

=== Air Force ===
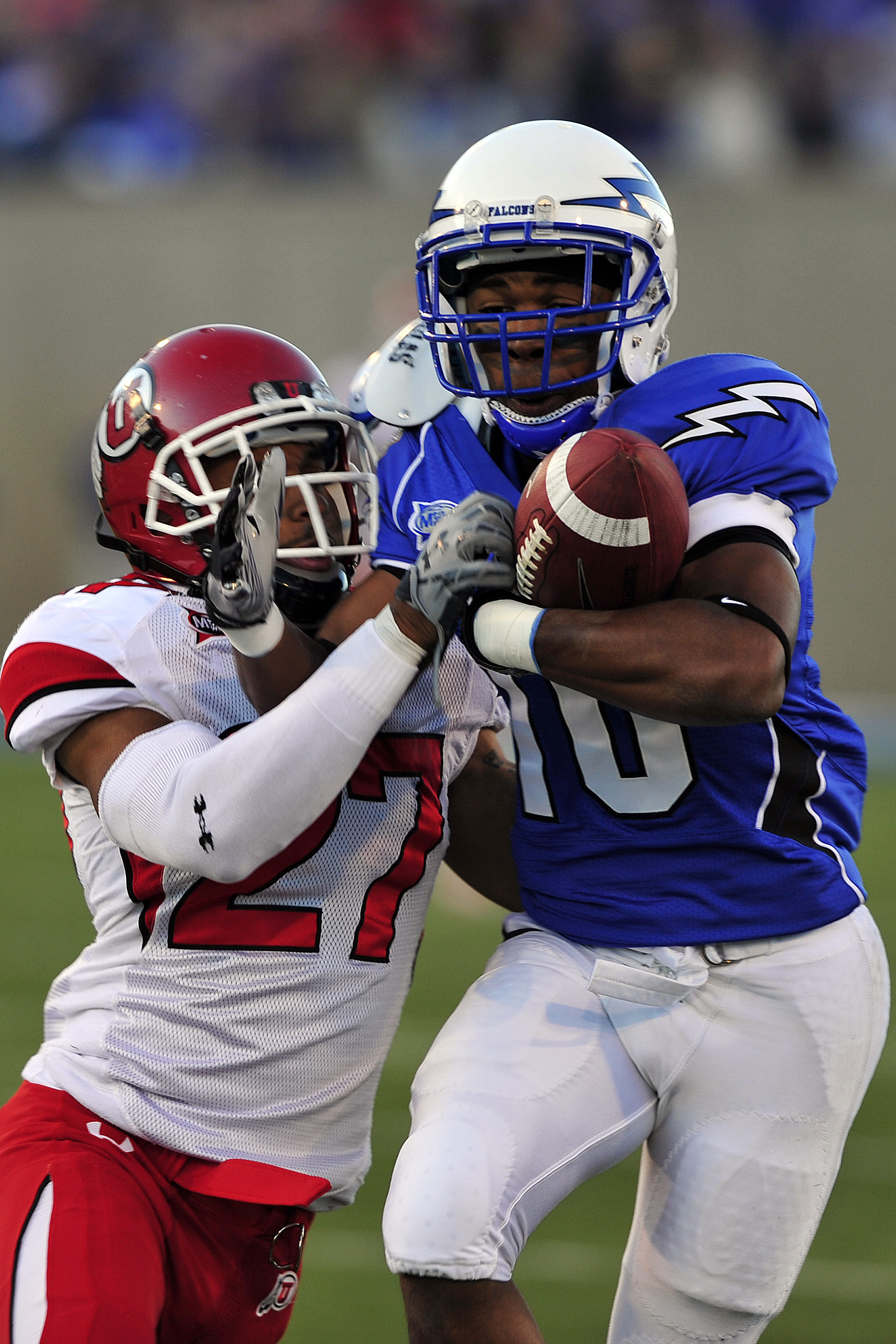
Cornerback Brandon Burton prevents Mikel Hunter from catching a pass.

	1	2	3	4	Total
#8 Utes	7	7	14	0	28
Falcons	7	3	0	13	23

Utah trails series: 13 – 14 – 0

Utah defeated Air Force 28–23 on October 30. The win improved Utah's record to 8–0 (5–0 MWC) and dropped Air Force to 5–4 (3–3 MWC). Entering the game, Utah had won six of the last seven meetings with Air Force, despite trailing in the overall series. Air Force is the only Mountain West Conference team to have won the majority of its games against Utah.

Utah's defense caused Air Force to commit five turnovers, which helped Utah to win the close game. Utah relied heavily on its running game to defeat Air Force; the Utes rushed the ball 51 times for 179 yards, while only attempting 23 passes. On the Utes' opening drive, they opened with seven consecutive runs by Matt Asiata, followed it with a 5-yard pass from Jordan Wynn to Jereme Brooks, and then finished the drive with five consecutive runs by Eddie Wide, including Wide's 1-yard touchdown run. The Utes took a 14–10 lead into halftime.

Late in the third quarter, Utah seemed to take control of the game. Utah took a 21–10 lead with 4:25 remaining in the third, when Wynn completed a 36-yard pass to Luke Matthews. About a minute later, Brian Blechen intercepted a pass from Tim Jefferson and returned it to the Air Force 18-yard line. 6 plays later, Utah scored a touchdown to take a 28–10 lead. However, Air Force would keep Utah from scoring the rest of the game and scored two more touchdowns to make the game closer. Quarterback Tim Jefferson scored a touchdown off of a 59-yard run. Air Force prevented Utah from gaining a first down on Utah's ensuing possession, and 72 seconds later, Air Force scored another touchdown on its next play from scrimmage. Jefferson completed a 49-yard pass to Kyle Halderman, with 10:30 remaining in the game. However, both teams' defenses kept the other team from scoring the rest of the game and Utah was able to secure the win.

After the game, the MWC named Safety Brian Blechen as its Defensive Player of the Week. Blechen had 9 tackles, of which 6 were solo tackles. One of the assisted tackles was for a loss. He also had one interception and one fumble recovery.

=== TCU ===
	1	2	3	4	Total
#4 Horned Frogs	20	3	14	10	47
#6 Utes	0	0	0	7	7

Utah leads series: 5 – 3 – 0

Hands down, the best football team we've played since I've been at Utah,

— Kyle Whittingham

TCU defeated Utah 47–7 on November 6 and took sole possession of first place in the MWC. TCU improved to 10–0 (6–0 MWC), and Utah dropped to 8–1 (5–1 MWC). Utah had won all three games the two teams have played in Salt Lake City. In 2009 TCU beat No. 16 Utah 55–28 at Amon G. Carter Stadium. The previous time these two teams met at Rice-Eccles Stadium, No. 10 Utah defeated No. 11 TCU 13–10.

ESPN's College GameDay was at Rice-Eccles Stadium on the morning of November 6 to preview the days college matchups. Approximately 10,000 fans were present to watch the live airing of the show.

=== Notre Dame ===
	1	2	3	4	Total
#15 Utes	3	0	0	0	3
Fighting Irish	7	7	14	0	28

Utah trails series: 0 – 1 – 0

This was the first meeting ever between these two teams.

=== San Diego State ===
	1	2	3	4	Total
#25 Utes	3	21	0	14	38
Aztecs	14	13	7	0	34

Utah leads series: 17 – 12 – 1

Entering the game, Utah had won the last four meetings against San Diego State, and was 7–6–1 for games played in San Diego.

=== BYU ===
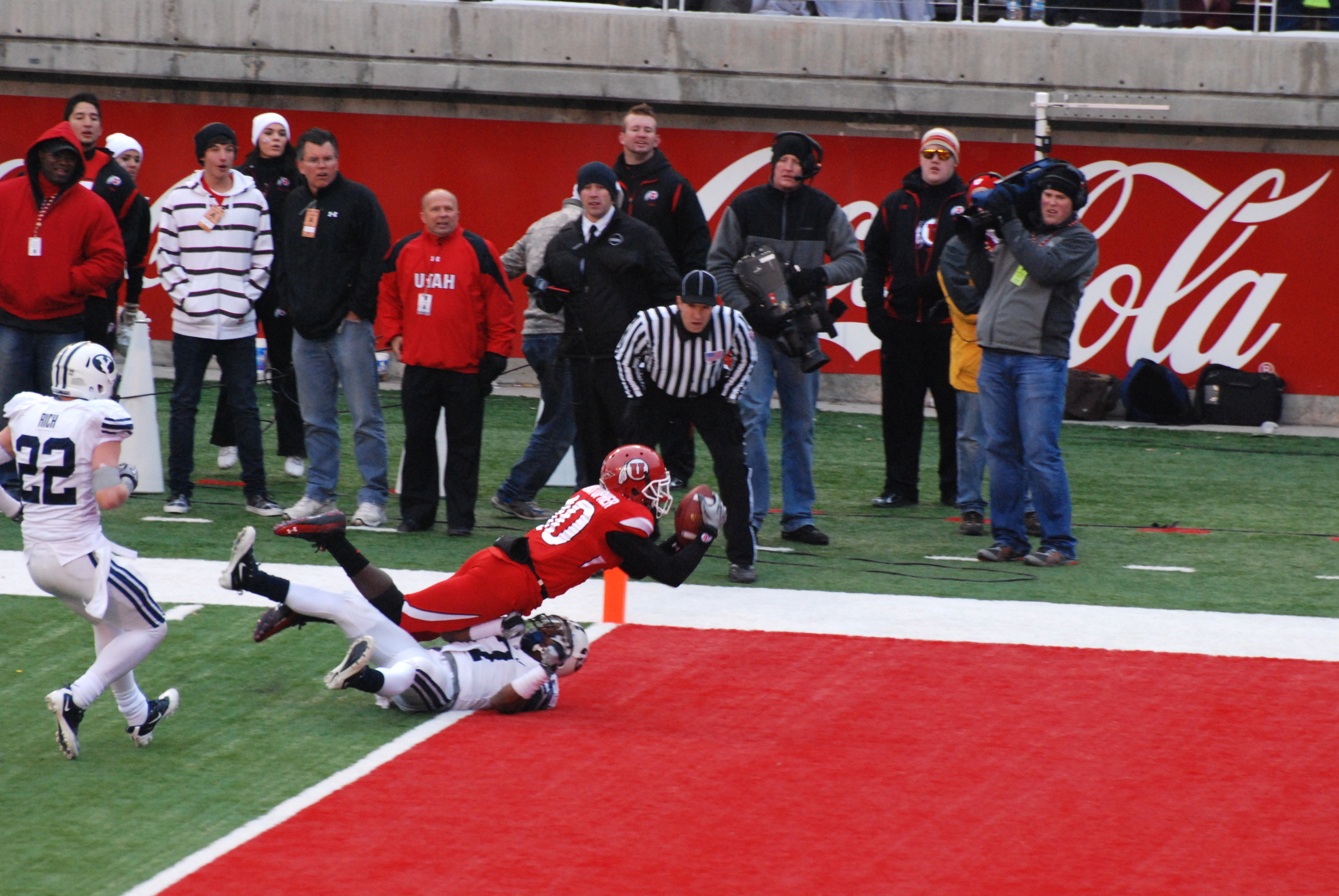
DeVonte Christopher catches a touchdown pass over Brian Logan; with the extra point Utah cut BYU's lead to 13–10.

	1	2	3	4	Total
Cougars	3	3	7	3	16
#23 Utes	0	0	0	17	17

Utah leads series: 54 – 34 – 4

This is the second longest series in Utah football history after the Utah–Utah State series. For games in Salt Lake City, Utah holds a lead of 35–17–3. Over the last 10 games, the teams have split the series 5–5.

=== Maaco Bowl Las Vegas ===
Utah trails series: 2 – 5 – 0

	1	2	3	4	Total
#20 Utes	3	0	0	0	3
#10 Broncos	0	16	7	3	26

Utah accepted an invitation to play in the 2010 edition of the Maaco Bowl Las Vegas. Utah's opponent was Boise State. Utah had been 2–0 in the Las Vegas Bowl.

== Roster ==
2010 Utah Utes football team roster
Players
Coaches
Offense

Pos.	#	Name	Class
WR	87	Dres Anderson	Fr
RB	4	Matt Asiata (C)	Sr
RB	34	Shawn Asiata	Jr
OL	70	Tony Bergstrom	Jr
OL	74	Sam Brenner	So
WR	85	Jereme Brooks	Sr
OL	73	Daniel Bukarau	Sr
RB	38	Beau Burton	RFr
QB	7	Terrance Cain	Sr
WR	10	DeVonte Christopher	So
TE	84	Brad Clifford	Sr
OL	75	John Cullen	Jr
WR	26	Mitchell Deas	Fr
WR	14	Reggie Dunn	So
WR	83	Sean Fitzgerald	RFr
WR	67	Jason Gardner	Fr
QB	15	J.J. Hyde	Fr
WR	19	Chandler Johnson	Fr
OL	64	Vyncent Jones	RFr
WR	17	Martavious Lee	Jr
WR	11	Luke Matthews	So
WR	16	Griff McNabb	RFr
WR	21	Devin Mickles	Fr
WR	8	Fatu Moala	RFr
TE	81	Kendrick Moeai	So
WR	18	Tyron Morris-Edwards	Fr
OL	69	Poʻu Palelei	So
TE		Jake Murphy	Fr
RB	44	Lucky Radley	Fr
WR	88	Dexter Ransom	Jr
RB	29	Mychal Robinson	Jr
QB	12	Griff Robles	RFr
TE	89	Dallin Rogers	So
OL	56	Kapua Sai	RFr
OL	72	Caleb Schlauderaff	Sr
WR	2	Kenneth Scott	Fr
RB	22	Sausan Shakerin	So
WR	1	Shaky Smithson	Sr
OL	66	Matt Snow	So
OL	54	Tevita Stevens	So
OL	79	Percy Taumoelau	RFr
OL	77	Zane Taylor (C)	Sr
OL	76	Jeremiah Tofaeono	RFr
TE	80	Westlee Tonga	Fr
OL	59	Ron Tongaonevai	So
QB	47	David Toth	Fr
OL	78	Sione Tupouniua	Fr
RB	24	Tauni Vakapuna	Jr
WR	20	Zach Wade	Jr
OL	71	Walter Watts	Sr
RB	36	Eddie Wide	Sr
RB		Karl Williams	Fr
QB	3	Jordan Wynn	So

Defense

Pos.	#	Name	Class
DT	93	Neli A'asa	Sr
LB		Kalen Adams	Fr
DT	91	James Aiono	Jr
LB	45	Boo Andersen	So
DB	35	Greg Bird	Jr
DB	9	Conroy Black	Jr
DB	2	Brian Blechen	Fr
LB	48	Tyson Buck	RFr
DB	27	Brandon Burton	Jr
DB	21	Lamar Chapman	Sr
DB	19	Quade Chappuis	RFr
DE	94	Christian Cox (C)	Sr
LB	53	Eric Dago	RFr
DB	8	Olivier Diansongi	Fr
LB	51	Dave Fagergren	So
LB	7	V.J. Fehoko	Fr
DB	23	Wykie Freeman	Fr
LB	42	Nai Fotu (injured)	Sr
LB	40	Jacoby Hale	Fr
DT	68	Latu Heimuli	RFr
DB	25	Mike Honeycutt	Fr
LB	41	Jamel King	Jr
DT	44	Dave Kruger	So
DE	99	Joe Kruger	Fr
DB	26	Ryan Lacy	So
DT	92	Star Lotulelei	So
DL	60	Semisi Makai	Fr
LB	18	Chad Manis	Sr
LB	52	Matt Martinez	Jr
DE	95	Darrian Mendivil	Fr
LB		Max Moala	Jr
DB	5	Damian Payne	Fr
DT	63	Joape Pela	So
DB	82	Terrell Reese	Fr
DE	49	Trevor Reilly	RFr
DE		David Rolf	Jr
LB		Chris Sciarretta	RFr
DE	90	Derrick Shelby	Jr
DT	98	Sealver Siliga (C)	Jr
CB	46	Jamal Smith	RFr
DB	20	Joseph Smith	Fr
DB	1	Ben Soliven	So
DB	31	Victor Spikes	So
DE	43	Lei Talamaivao	Jr
DB	33	Justin Taplin-Ross	Sr
LB		Austin Taylor	Fr
DB	38	Lolo Tenifa	Jr
DB	28	Reggie Topps	So
DE	96	Junior Tuiʻone	Sr
DT	58	LT Tuipulotu	RFr
LB	32	Chaz Walker	Jr
DB	15	Michael Walker	Fr
DB	37	Chris Washington	RFr
DB	34	Tyler Whittingham	Jr
LB	13	J.J. Williams	Jr
DB	6	Kamaron Yancy	Sr

Special teams

Pos.	#	Name	Class
LS	62	Patrick Greene	So
P	30	Nick Marsh	RFr
K	39	Joe Phillips	Sr
P	86	Sean Sellwood	So

Head coach

- Kyle Whittingham

Coordinators/assistant coaches

- Dave Schramm – Co-offensive coordinator/tight ends
- Aaron Roderick – Co-offensive coordinator/wide receivers
- Kalani Sitake – Defensive Coordinator/Linebackers
- Aaron Alford – Running Backs
- Jay Hill – Special Teams/Cornerbacks
- Brian Johnson – Quarterbacks
- Blake Miller – Offensive line
- John Pease – Assistant Head Coach/defensive line
- Morgan Scalley – Safeties/recruiting coordinator

Legend

- (C) Team captain
- (S) Suspended
- (I) Ineligible
- Injured
- Redshirt

Roster
Last update: August 4, 2010

== After the season ==
=== Awards ===
==== MWC Awards ====
MWC First Team

- Caleb Schlauderaff – Senior OL
- Zane Taylor – Senior OL
- Joe Phillips – Senior PK
- Christian Cox – Senior DL

MWC Second Team

- Jereme Brooks – Senior WR
- Tony Bergstrom – Junior OL
- Shaky Smithson – Senior PR/KR
- Chaz Walker – Junior LB
- Brandon Burton – Junior DB

MWC Honorable Mention

- Brian Blechen – Freshman DB
- Lamar Chapman – Senior DB
- DeVonte Christopher – Sophomore WR
- Matt Martinez – Junior LB
- Sealver Siliga – Junior DL

==== Walter Camp All-Americans ====
Utah had two players named to the Walter Camp All-American team. Walter Camp is one of the selectors the NCAA recognizes to determine Consensus All-Americans.

- Shaky Smithson – first team
- Caleb Schlauderaff – second time

=== NFL draft ===
Utah had these players drafted during the 2011 NFL draft:

Player	Position	Round	Pick	NFL club
Brandon Burton	Cornerback	5	139	Minnesota Vikings
Caleb Schlauderaff	Guard	6	179	Green Bay Packers
