= 2010 UNLV Rebels football team =

American college football season

2010 UNLV Rebels football
- Conference: Mountain West Conference
- Record: 2–11 (2–6 MW)
- Head coach: Bobby Hauck (1st season)
- Offensive coordinator: Rob Phenicie (1st season)
- Offensive scheme: Multiple
- Defensive coordinator: Kraig Paulson (1st season)
- Captains: Alex De Giacomo; John Gianninoto; Matt Murphy; Ronnie Paulo
- Home stadium: Sam Boyd Stadium

2010 Mountain West Conference football standings
	Conf.			Overall
Team	W		L	W		L
No. 2 TCU $	8	–	0	13	–	0
Utah	7	–	1	10	–	3
Air Force	5	–	3	9	–	4
San Diego State	5	–	3	9	–	4
BYU	5	–	3	7	–	6
Colorado State	2	–	6	3	–	9
UNLV	2	–	6	2	–	11
Wyoming	1	–	7	3	–	9
New Mexico	1	–	7	1	–	11
$ – Conference champion and BCS representative as top non-AQ school to meet automatic qualification criteria; As of January 11, 2011; Rankings from AP Poll

The 2010 UNLV Rebels football team represented the University of Nevada, Las Vegas (UNLV) as a member of the Mountain West Conference (MW) during the 2010 NCAA Division I FBS football season. Led by first-year head coach Bobby Hauck, the Rebels compiled an overall record of 2–11 record with mark of 2–6 in conference play, tying for sixth place in the MW. The team played home games at Sam Boyd Stadium in Whitney, Nevada.

== Schedule ==
Date	Time	Opponent	Site	TV	Result	Attendance	Source
September 4	8:00 p.m.	No. 12 Wisconsin*	Sam Boyd Stadium; Whitney, NV	Versus	L 21–41	31,107	
September 11	1:00 p.m.	at No. 20 Utah	Rice–Eccles Stadium; Salt Lake City, UT	MWSN	L 10–38	45,102	
September 18	7:30 p.m.	at Idaho*	Kibbie Dome; Moscow, ID	ESPNU	L 7–30	15,390	
September 25	7:00 p.m.	New Mexico	Sam Boyd Stadium; Whitney, NV	MWSN	W 45–10	16,961	
October 2	7:00 p.m.	No. 25 Nevada*	Sam Boyd Stadium; Whitney, NV (Fremont Cannon)	MWSN	L 26–44	28,958	
October 9	12:30 p.m.	at West Virginia*	Milan Puskar Stadium; Morgantown, WV	BEN	L 10–49	58,234	
October 16	11:00 a.m.	at Colorado State	Hughes Stadium; Fort Collins, CO	MWSN	L 10–43	30,753	
October 30	8:00 pm	No. 4 TCU	Sam Boyd Stadium; Whitney, NV	CBSCS	L 6–48	16,745	
November 6	11:00 a.m.	at BYU	LaVell Edwards Stadium; Provo, UT	MWSN	L 7–55	61,283	
November 13	7:00 p.m.	Wyoming^{†}	Sam Boyd Stadium; Whitney, NV	MWSN	W 42–16	16,111	
November 18	7:00 p.m.	Air Force	Sam Boyd Stadium; Whitney, NV	CBSCS	L 20–35	13,790	
November 27	5:00 p.m.	at San Diego State	Qualcomm Stadium; San Diego, CA	MWSN	L 14–48	22,091	
December 4	7:30 p.m.	at No. 25 Hawaii*	Aloha Stadium; Halawa, HI		L 21–59	37,820	
*Non-conference game; ^{†}Homecoming; Rankings from AP Poll released prior to the game; All times are in Pacific time

== Preseason ==
At the 2010 Mountain West Conference Media Day, UNLV was picked to finish eighth in the conference, due to their schedule which consisted of nine teams that went to bowl games in the previous season and included games with Wisconsin, at West Virginia, at Idaho, at Hawaii and Nevada. Also at the Media Day, junior wide receiver Phillip Payne was voted to the preseason All-Mountain West Conference team, marking the fourth consecutive season that a UNLV wide receiver had been selected to the preseason All-MWC team.

At the end of August 2010, linebacker Ronnie Paulo, safety Alex De Giacomo, offensive tackle Matt Murphy, and center John Gianninoto were named as team captains for the 2010 season. Less than a week before the start of the season, first-year head coach Bobby Hauck announced that junior Mike Clausen had beat out senior incumbent Omar Clayton for the starting quarterback position and would start in the season opener against Wisconsin.

=== Coaching changes ===
On November 15, 2009, the Las Vegas Sun announced that Mike Sanford Sr. would be let go as head coach following the completion of the season on November 28, 2009. In five years as UNLV's head coach, Sanford posted a 16—43 overall record, a 8–32 record in the Mountain West and a 0–5 record against UNLV's arch rival, Nevada. Sanford's overall winning percentage of .271 was the second worst in the program's history; only Jeff Horton's .228 (13—44 in five years) was worse. Jerry Koloskie, UNLV's interim athletic director, stated that Sanford's dismissal was a "performance-based issue" In Sanford's five seasons as head coach at UNLV, the team did not have a single winning season, with their best records under Sanford's tenure being back-to-back 5–7 marks in 2008 and 2009. On December 22, 2009, Sanford was hired by new Louisville head coach, Charlie Strong, to be Louisville's offensive coordinator.

On December 22, 2009, newly hired athletic director, Jim Livengood, hired Montana head coach to become the tenth head coach in the program's history. Hauck and former head coach Dennis Franchione were interviewed for the vacant position, Hauck on December 20, 2009 and Franchione on December 21, 2009. Hauck had a second interview on December 22, 2009 to iron out contract negotiations. Hauck's contract was for three years with a $350,000 annual salary and $150,000 in completion bonuses. Other coaches that were rumored as candidates for the head coaching position were Jacksonville Jaguars defensive coordinator Dirk Koetter, Idaho's head coach Robb Akey and former Washington head coach Tyrone Willingham.

On January 4, 2009, it was reported that six of Hauck's assistants from Montana would join his staff at UNLV, including former offensive coordinator Rob Phenicie and defensive coordinator Kraig Paulson has the same positions with UNLV. Ty Gregorak was named recruiting coordinator and linebackers coach, Chad Germer was named offensive line coach, Dominic Daste was named tight ends coach, and Cedric Cormier was named wide receivers coach. Utah defensive backs coach J. D. Williams was hired by Hauck to be his assistant head coach, pass defense coordinator, and defensive backs coach.

=== Recruiting ===
Hauck met with most of the returning Rebels players within the first few days of his introduction as the new head coach and the players stated that they had quickly become fond of their new head coach. Within a month, Hauck was able to receive commitments from high school prospects in Southern Nevada, a problem that plagued Sanford during his tenure. Hauck was even able to get three star defensive end Ian Bobak who had originally committed to in-state rival Nevada.

College recruiting information
Name	Hometown	School	Height	Weight	40^{‡}	Commit date
Ian Bobak; DE	Las Vegas. NV	Bishop Gorman HS	6 ft 4 in (1.93 m)	245 lb (111 kg)	4.73	Jan 10, 2010
Ian Bobak; DE	Recruit ratings: Scout: Rivals:					
Nolan Kohorst; K	Henderson, NV	Green Valley HS	6 ft 0 in (1.83 m)	175 lb (79 kg)	-	Jan 10, 2010
Nolan Kohorst; K	Recruit ratings: Scout: Rivals:					
Desmond Tautofi; DE	Las Vegas, NV	Calvary Chapel CS	6 ft 4 in (1.93 m)	237 lb (108 kg)	-	Jan 10, 2010
Desmond Tautofi; DE	Recruit ratings: Scout: Rivals:					
Quentin Jones; DT	Columbus, OH	Northland HS	6 ft 0 in (1.83 m)	311 lb (141 kg)	4.97	Apr 17, 2009
Quentin Jones; DT	Recruit ratings: Scout: Rivals:					
Taylor Spencer; WR	Las Vegas, NV	Bishop Gorman HS	6 ft 1 in (1.85 m)	189 lb (86 kg)	4.61	Jan 10, 2010
Taylor Spencer; WR	Recruit ratings: Scout: Rivals:					
Sean Linton; WR	La Mesa, CA	Helix HS	6 ft 2 in (1.88 m)	180 lb (82 kg)	4.6	Jan 28, 2009
Sean Linton; WR	Recruit ratings: Scout:					
Eric Tuiloma; S	Las Vegas, NV	Desert Pines HS	5 ft 11 in (1.80 m)	185 lb (84 kg)	4.64	Jan 10, 2010
Eric Tuiloma; S	Recruit ratings: Rivals:					
Overall recruit ranking:
‡ Refers to 40-yard dash; Note: In many cases, Scout, Rivals, 247Sports, On3, and ESPN may conflict in their listings of height, weight and 40 time.; In these cases, the average was taken. ESPN grades are on a 100-point scale.; Sources: "UNLV Commit List for 2010". Rivals.; "UNLV: Commits". Scout.; "Scout.com Team Recruiting Rankings". Scout.; "2010 Team Ranking". Rivals.com.
