= 2010 New Mexico Bowl =

American college football game

- 5th New Mexico Bowl
- New Mexico Bowl logo
BYU Cougars	UTEP Miners
(6–6)	(6–6)
Mountain West	C-USA
52	24
Head coach: Bronco Mendenhall	Head coach: Mike Price
	1	2	3	4	Total
BYU	17	14	14	7	52
UTEP	3	7	7	7	24
- Date: December 18, 2010
- Season: 2010
- Stadium: University Stadium
- Location: Albuquerque, New Mexico
- MVP: QB Jake Heaps, BYU; S Andrew Rich, BYU
- Favorite: BYU by 11.5
- Referee: Stan Evans (MAC)
- Attendance: 32,424
- Payout: US$750,000 per team

United States TV coverage
- Network: ESPN
- Announcers: Bob Wischusen, Brian Griese and Jenn Brown
- Nielsen ratings: 1.8 / 2.78M

The 2010 New Mexico Bowl was a post-season American college football bowl game, held on December 18, 2010, at University Stadium on the campus of the University of New Mexico in Albuquerque, New Mexico. It was one of the 2010–11 NCAA football bowl games concluding the 2010 season. The organizers introduced a new logo to celebrate the 5th anniversary of the game on September 29, 2010.

The game, which was telecast at noon MST on ESPN, featured the UTEP Miners from Conference USA and the BYU Cougars from the Mountain West Conference. Both were former members of the Western Athletic Conference where the Cougars dominated the series with a 28–7–1 record. BYU, making its 29th bowl appearance, came into the game winning five out of seven games after a 1–4 start. UTEP, in just its 13th bowl, had dropped six of seven after opening the season 5–1. Both teams were making their first New Mexico Bowl appearance. UTEP was the first team from outside the WAC or MWC to play in the game due to the bowl organizers wanting a more regional matchup.

BYU won the game in dominating fashion by a score of 52–24. Freshman quarterback Jake Heaps took home MVP honors with a game-record four touchdown passes, helping his team to a 31–3 second quarter lead. UTEP extended its bowl game losing streak to five, the second-longest streak in the nation.

== Game summary ==
=== Scoring summary ===
Scoring Play	Score
1st Quarter
BYU - Bryan Kariya 4 yard run (Mitch Payne kick), 10:29	BYU 7–0
BYU - Jake Heaps 9 yard pass to Luke Ashworth (Mitch Payne kick), 4:37	BYU 14–0
UTEP - Dakota Warren 52 yard field goal, 2:42	BYU 14–3
BYU - Mitch Payne 38 yard field goal, 0:34	BYU 17–3
2nd Quarter
BYU - Jake Heaps 31 yard pass to Cody Hoffman (Mitch Payne kick), 14:42	BYU 24–3
BYU - Jake Heaps 3 yard pass to Cody Hoffman (Mitch Payne kick), 8:55	BYU 31–3
UTEP - Trevor Vittatoe 67 yard pass to Kris Adams (Dakota Warren kick), 8:38	BYU 31–10
3rd Quarter
BYU - JJ Di Luigi 2 yard run (Mitch Payne kick), 8:18	BYU 38–10
UTEP - Trevor Vittatoe 37 yard pass to Kris Adams (Dakota Warren kick), 4:55	BYU 38–17
BYU - Jake Heaps 29 yard pass to Cody Hoffman (Mitch Payne kick), 0:14	BYU 45–17
4th Quarter
BYU - Joshua Quezada 8 yard run (Mitch Payne kick), 12:00	BYU 52–17
UTEP - Trevor Vittatoe 49 yard pass to Kris Adams (Dakota Warren kick), 9:48	BYU 52–24

=== Statistics ===
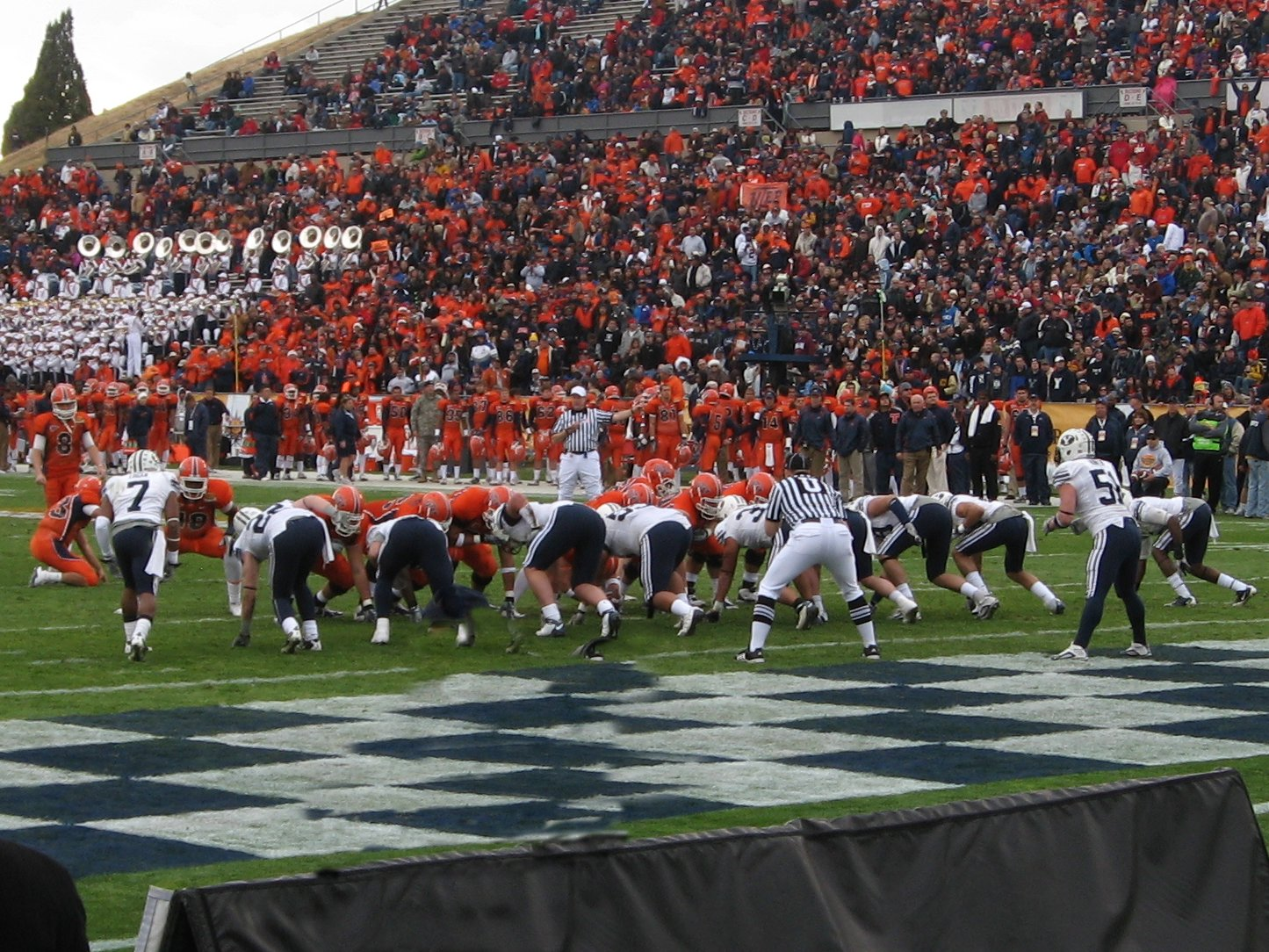
UTEP (in orange) preparing to kick an extra point.

Statistics	BYU	UTEP
First downs	28	13
Rushes–yards (net)	50–219	22–12
Passing yards (net)	295	245
Passes, Att–Comp–Int	36–26–2	33–14–3
Total offense, plays–yards	86–514	55–233
Time of Possession	38:16	21:44

== Game notes ==
- UTEP was playing in their first bowl game since 2005.
- The Miners have lost five straight bowl games, tied for the second longest active streak in the nation.
- UTEP hasn't won a bowl game since defeating Ole Miss in the 1967 Sun Bowl (held on their campus).
- BYU's Jake Heaps became the first freshman quarterback to start a bowl game in school history.
- In the second quarter, Heaps broke Ty Detmer's 22-year-old BYU freshman record for most passing TDs in a season with 15.
- Heaps' four touchdown passes in the game set a New Mexico Bowl record.
- The game was BYU's final as a member of the Mountain West Conference. They began to play as an independent starting in 2011.
