= 2010 Air Force Falcons football team =

American college football season

2010 Air Force Falcons football

Independence Bowl champion

Independence Bowl, W 14–7 vs. Georgia Tech
- Conference: Mountain West Conference
- Record: 9–4 (5–3 MW)
- Head coach: Troy Calhoun (4th season)
- Offensive coordinator: Clay Hendrix (4th season)
- Co-offensive coordinators: Blane Morgan (4th season); Mike Thiessen (2nd season)
- Offensive scheme: Triple option
- Co-defensive coordinators: Matt Wallerstedt (2nd season); Charlton Warren (2nd season)
- Base defense: Multiple
- Captain: Game captains
- Home stadium: Falcon Stadium

2010 Mountain West Conference football standings
| | Conf. | | | Overall |
| Team | W | | L | W | | L |
|---|---|---|---|---|---|---|
| No. 2 TCU $ | 8 | – | 0 | 13 | – | 0 |
| Utah | 7 | – | 1 | 10 | – | 3 |
| Air Force | 5 | – | 3 | 9 | – | 4 |
| San Diego State | 5 | – | 3 | 9 | – | 4 |
| BYU | 5 | – | 3 | 7 | – | 6 |
| Colorado State | 2 | – | 6 | 3 | – | 9 |
| UNLV | 2 | – | 6 | 2 | – | 11 |
| Wyoming | 1 | – | 7 | 3 | – | 9 |
| New Mexico | 1 | – | 7 | 1 | – | 11 |
$ – Conference champion and BCS representative as top non-AQ school to meet automatic qualification criteria; As of January 11, 2011; Rankings from AP Poll

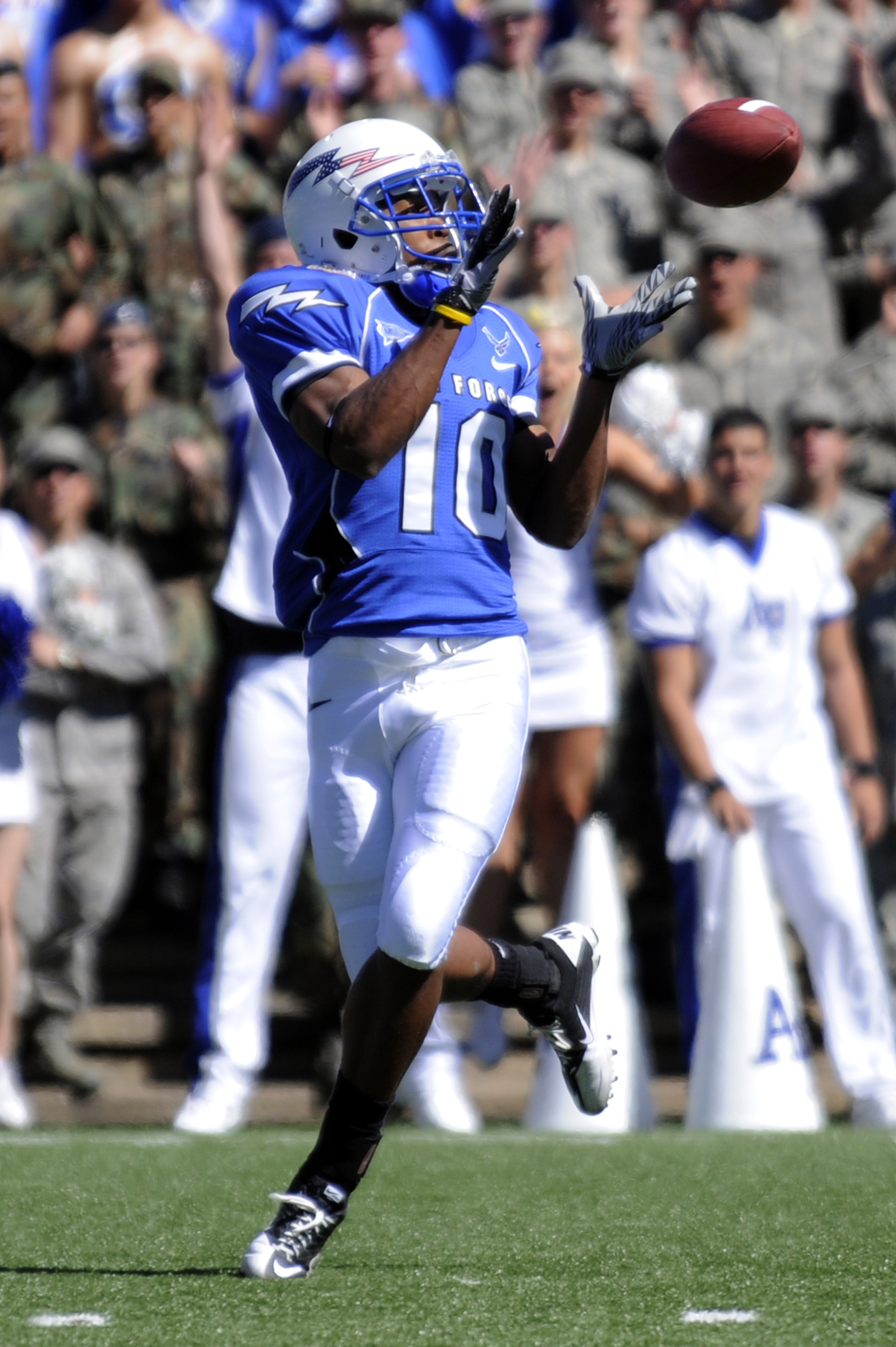
Falcons wide receiver Mikel Hunter pulls in a pass for a touchdown during the Air Force–BYU game.

The 2010 Air Force Falcons football team represented the United States Air Force Academy as a member of the Mountain West Conference (MW) during the 2010 NCAA Division I FBS football season. Led by fourth-year head coach Troy Calhoun, the Falcons compiled an overall record of 9–4 with a mark of 5–3 in conference play, tying for third place in the MW. Air Force was invited to the Independence Bowl, where the Falcons defeated Georgia Tech. The team played home games at Falcon Stadium in Colorado Springs, Colorado

During their games against Navy and Army, the Falcons wore a special uniform design modeled after the flying suits and helmets worn by the United States Air Force Thunderbirds, with each player's nameplate featuring either the word "SERVICE" or "FREEDOM". Air Force defeated both Navy and Army, winning them the Commander-in-Chief's Trophy for the first time since 2002.

== Schedule ==
| Date | Time | Opponent | Rank | Site | TV | Result | Attendance | Source |
|---|---|---|---|---|---|---|---|---|
| September 4 | 12:00 p.m. | Northwestern State* | | Falcon Stadium; Colorado Springs, CO | | W 65–21 | 40,236 | |
| September 11 | 2:00 p.m. | BYU | | Falcon Stadium; Colorado Springs, CO | Versus | W 35–14 | 46,692 | |
| September 18 | 1:30 p.m. | at No. 7 Oklahoma* | | Gaylord Family Oklahoma Memorial Stadium; Norman, OK | FSN | L 24–27 | 84,332 | |
| September 25 | 12:00 p.m. | at Wyoming | | War Memorial Stadium; Laramie, WY | Mtn. | W 20–14 | 22,413 | |
| October 2 | 12:30 p.m. | Navy* | | Falcon Stadium; Colorado Springs, CO (Commander-in-Chief's Trophy) | Versus | W 14–6 | 47,565 | |
| October 9 | 12:00 p.m. | Colorado State | No. 25 | Falcon Stadium; Colorado Springs, CO (rivalry) | Mtn. | W 49–27 | 41,547 | |
| October 16 | 6:00 p.m. | at San Diego State | No. 23 | Qualcomm Stadium; San Diego, CA | CBSCS | L 25–27 | 28,178 | |
| October 23 | 6:00 p.m. | at No. 4 TCU | | Amon G. Carter Stadium; Fort Worth, TX | CBSCS | L 7–38 | 46,096 | |
| October 30 | 5:30 p.m. | No. 8 Utah | | Falcon Stadium; Colorado Springs, CO | CBSCS | L 23–28 | 37,211 | |
| November 6 | 10:00 a.m. | at Army* | | Michie Stadium; West Point, NY (Commander-in-Chief's Trophy) | CBSCS | W 42–22 | 38,128 | |
| November 13 | 4:00 p.m. | New Mexico | | Falcon Stadium; Colorado Springs, CO | Mtn. | W 48–23 | 27,309 | |
| November 18 | 8:00 p.m. | at UNLV | | Sam Boyd Stadium; Whitney, NV | CBSCS | W 35–20 | 13,790 | |
| December 27 | 3:00 p.m. | vs. Georgia Tech* | | Independence Stadium; Shreveport, LA (Independence Bowl) | ESPN2 | W 14–7 | 39,362 | |
*Non-conference game; Rankings from AP Poll released prior to the game; All times are in Mountain time

== Rankings ==
Ranking movements Legend: ██ Increase in ranking ██ Decrease in ranking RV = Received votes
| | Week | | | | | | | | | | | | | | | |
| Poll | Pre | 1 | 2 | 3 | 4 | 5 | 6 | 7 | 8 | 9 | 10 | 11 | 12 | 13 | 14 | Final |
|---|---|---|---|---|---|---|---|---|---|---|---|---|---|---|---|---|
| AP | | | RV | RV | RV | 25 | 23 | RV | | | | | | RV | RV | RV |
| Coaches | | RV | RV | RV | RV | RV | 23 | RV | RV | | | RV | | RV | | RV |
| Harris | Not released | | | | | | 23 | RV | | | RV | RV | RV | RV | RV | Not released |
| BCS | Not released | | | | | | | | | | | | | | | Not released |

== Roster ==
- QB Tim Jefferson, Jr.
