= 2010 Colorado State Rams football team =

American college football season

2010 Colorado State Rams football
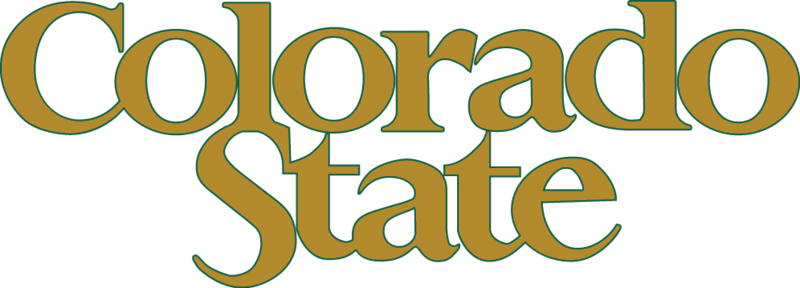
- Conference: Mountain West Conference
- Record: 3–9 (2–6 MW)
- Head coach: Steve Fairchild (3rd season)
- Offensive coordinator: Pat Meyer (1st season)
- Defensive coordinator: Larry Kerr (13th season)
- Home stadium: Sonny Lubick Field at Hughes Stadium

2010 Mountain West Conference football standings
	Conf.			Overall
Team	W		L	W		L
No. 2 TCU $	8	–	0	13	–	0
Utah	7	–	1	10	–	3
Air Force	5	–	3	9	–	4
San Diego State	5	–	3	9	–	4
BYU	5	–	3	7	–	6
Colorado State	2	–	6	3	–	9
UNLV	2	–	6	2	–	11
Wyoming	1	–	7	3	–	9
New Mexico	1	–	7	1	–	11
$ – Conference champion and BCS representative as top non-AQ school to meet automatic qualification criteria; As of January 11, 2011; Rankings from AP Poll

The 2010 Colorado State Rams football team represented Colorado State University in the 2010 NCAA Division I FBS football season. The team was coached by third year head coach Steve Fairchild and played their home games in Hughes Stadium in Fort Collins, Colorado. They played in the Mountain West Conference. On August 17, true freshman Pete Thomas was named the starting quarterback, making him the first freshman starter since Caleb Hanie in 2004. They finished the season with a record of 3–9 (1–7 MWC).

== Schedule ==
The Rams played the following games:

Date	Time	Opponent	Site	TV	Result	Attendance
September 4	12:00 p.m.	vs. Colorado*	Invesco Field at Mile High; Denver, CO (Rocky Mountain Showdown)	mtn.	L 3–24	60,989
September 11	8:30 p.m.	at Nevada*	Mackay Stadium; Reno, NV	ESPNU	L 6–51	18,098
September 18	1:30 p.m.	at Miami (OH)*	Yager Stadium; Oxford, OH	ESPN3	L 10–31	16,691
September 25	2:00 p.m.	Idaho*	Hughes Stadium; Fort Collins, CO		W 36–34	23,925
October 2	12:00 p.m.	No. 5 TCU	Hughes Stadium; Fort Collins, CO	the mtn.	L 0–27	22,553
October 9	12:00 p.m.	at No. 25 Air Force	Falcon Stadium; Colorado Springs, CO (Ram–Falcon Trophy)	mtn.	L 27–49	41,547
October 16	12:00 p.m.	UNLV	Hughes Stadium; Fort Collins, CO	mtn.	W 43–10	30,753
October 23	4:00 p.m.	at No. 9 Utah	Rice-Eccles Stadium; Salt Lake City, UT	mtn.	L 6–59	45,029
October 30	4:00 p.m.	New Mexico	Hughes Stadium; Fort Collins, CO	mtn.	W 38–14	18,266
November 6	8:00 p.m.	at San Diego State	Qualcomm Stadium; San Diego, CA	mtn.	L 19–24	34,689
November 13	12:00 p.m.	BYU	Hughes Stadium; Fort Collins, CO	mtn.	L 10–49	16,501
November 20	12:00 p.m.	at Wyoming	War Memorial Stadium; Laramie, WY (The Border War)	mtn.	L 0–44	17,011
*Non-conference game; Rankings from AP Poll released prior to the game; All times are in Mountain time
