= 2010 Independence Bowl =

2010 AdvoCare V100 Independence Bowl
- 35th Independence Bowl
Air Force Falcons	Georgia Tech Yellow Jackets
(8–4)	(6–6)
Mountain West	ACC
14	7
Head coach: Troy Calhoun	Head coach: Paul Johnson
	1	2	3	4	Total
Air Force	3	3	0	8	14
Georgia Tech	7	0	0	0	7
- Date: December 27, 2010
- Season: 2010
- Stadium: Independence Stadium
- Location: Shreveport, Louisiana
- MVP: RB Jared Tew, Air Force; DT Rick Ricketts, Air Force
- Favorite: Air Force by 2.5
- Referee: Tony Backert (Sun Belt)
- Attendance: 39,362
- Payout: US$1,100,000 per team

United States TV coverage
- Network: ESPN2
- Announcers: Mark Jones, Bob Davie, and Eamon McAnaney
- Nielsen ratings: TBD

The 2010 AdvoCare V100 Independence Bowl was the thirty-fifth edition of the college football bowl game and was played at Independence Stadium in Shreveport, Louisiana. The game started at 5:00 p.m. US EST on Monday, December 27, 2010. The game was telecast on ESPN2 and featured the Georgia Tech Yellow Jackets from the Atlantic Coast Conference (ACC) versus Air Force from the Mountain West Conference (MWC), the nation's top two rushing teams.

== Teams ==
=== Air Force Falcons ===
Air Force officially accepted an invitation to the bowl on December 1, 2010. The Falcons finished the regular season with an 8–4 record. The appearance in the Independence Bowl was the 4th straight year that Air Force appeared in a bowl game. The Falcons played in the Armed Forces Bowl for the preceding 3 seasons. Air Force played in its third Independence Bowl in school history. They entered the game with a 2–0 record in the bowl with a 9–3 victory over Ole Miss in 1983 and a 23–7 win over Virginia Tech in 1984. Air Force enters the game as the second ranked team in rushing offense with 317.9 yards per game, 437.4 yards in total offense.

=== Georgia Tech Yellow Jackets ===
Georgia Tech came into the Independence Bowl with a 6–6 record. The game marked the Jackets' 14th-straight bowl appearance, which was the fourth longest active streak in FBS. However, they came into the game with a five-game bowl losing streak. Georgia Tech led the country with 327 rushing yards per game. The previous season the Yellow Jackets won the ACC and played in the Orange Bowl where they were defeated by Iowa 24–14. This was the first time that Georgia Tech played in the Independence Bowl. The Yellow Jackets had 414.5 yards per game in total offense during the season.

== Game Summary ==
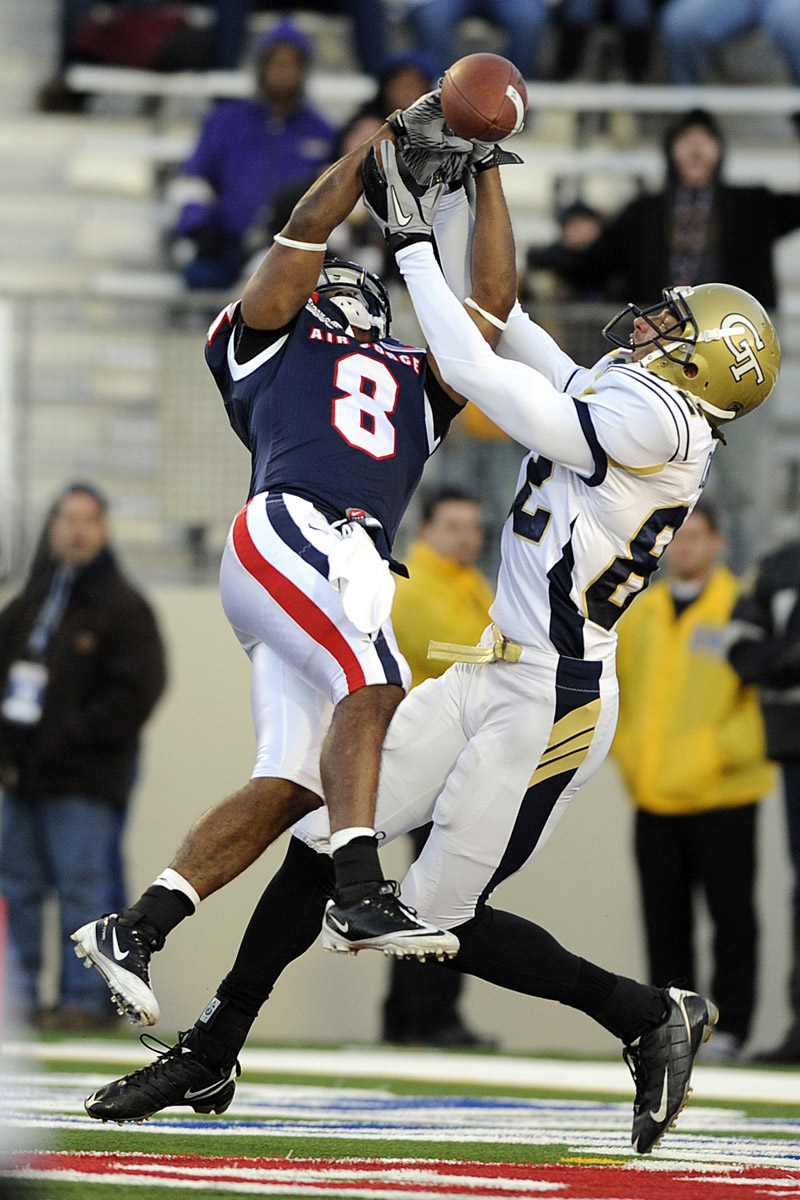
Air Force defensive back Jon Davis intercepts a pass intended for Georgia Tech running back Embry Peeples

=== Scoring ===
Scoring Play	Score
1st Quarter
AFA - Zack Bell 42 yard kick, 6:32	AFA 3–0
GT - Anthony Allen 5 yard run (Scott Blair kick), 0:41	GT 7–3
2nd Quarter
AFA - Zack Bell 41 yard kick, 0:00	GT 7–6
3rd Quarter
No scoring	GT 7–6
4th Quarter
AFA - Jared Tew 3 yard run (Two-point conversion), 13:24	AFA 14–7

=== Statistics ===
Statistics	Air Force	Georgia Tech
First downs	17	18
Total offense, plays-yards	72-287	71-320
Rushes-yards (net)	49-170	57-279
Passes, Comp-Att-Yds	11-23-117	5-14-41
Fumbles-Interceptions	0-0	3-1
Time of Possession	30:40	29:20

== Game Notes ==
The two teams have played each other three previous times, in successive years (1977–79) with Georgia Tech winning all three matchups. The two teams have never faced each other in a bowl game.
