= 2010 Wyoming Cowboys football team =

American college football season

2010 Wyoming Cowboys football
- Conference: Mountain West Conference
- Record: 3–9 (1–7 MW)
- Head coach: Dave Christensen (2nd season)
- Offensive coordinator: Marcus Arroyo (2nd season)
- Offensive scheme: Spread
- Defensive coordinator: Marty English (2nd season)
- Base defense: 4–3
- Home stadium: War Memorial Stadium

2010 Mountain West Conference football standings
	Conf.			Overall
Team	W		L	W		L
No. 2 TCU $	8	–	0	13	–	0
Utah	7	–	1	10	–	3
Air Force	5	–	3	9	–	4
San Diego State	5	–	3	9	–	4
BYU	5	–	3	7	–	6
Colorado State	2	–	6	3	–	9
UNLV	2	–	6	2	–	11
Wyoming	1	–	7	3	–	9
New Mexico	1	–	7	1	–	11
$ – Conference champion and BCS representative as top non-AQ school to meet automatic qualification criteria; As of January 11, 2011; Rankings from AP Poll

The 2010 Wyoming Cowboys football team represented the University of Wyoming as a member Mountain West Conference (MW) during the 2010 NCAA Division I FBS football season. Led by second-year head coach Dave Christensen, the Cowboys compiled an overall record of 3–9 record with mark 1–7 in conference play, tying for eighth place at the bottom of the MW standings. The team played home games at War Memorial Stadium in Laramie, Wyoming.

== Schedule ==
Date	Time	Opponent	Site	TV	Result	Attendance	Source
September 4	7:00 p.m.	Southern Utah*	War Memorial Stadium; Laramie, WY		W 28–20	20,043	
September 11	5:00 p.m.	at No. 5 Texas*	Darrell K Royal–Texas Memorial Stadium; Austin, TX	FSN	L 7–34	101,339	
September 18	6:00 p.m.	No. 3 Boise State*	War Memorial Stadium; Laramie, WY	CBSCS	L 6–51	29,014	
September 25	12:00 p.m.	Air Force	War Memorial Stadium; Laramie, WY	mtn.	L 14–20	22,413	
October 2	5:00 p.m.	at Toledo*	Glass Bowl; Toledo, OH	BCSN	W 20–15	20,843	
October 9	1:30 p.m.	at No. 5 TCU	Amon G. Carter Stadium; Fort Worth, TX	CBSCS	L 0–45	38,081	
October 16	4:00 p.m.	No. 11 Utah	War Memorial Stadium; Laramie, WY	mtn.	L 6–30	20,014	
October 23	12:00 p.m.	at BYU	LaVell Edwards Stadium; Provo, UT	mtn.	L 20–25	60,505	
October 30	12:00 p.m.	San Diego State	War Memorial Stadium; Laramie, WY	mtn.	L 38–48	16,252	
November 6	4:00 p.m.	at New Mexico	University Stadium; Albuquerque, NM	mtn.	L 31–34	18,017	
November 13	8:00 p.m.	at UNLV	Sam Boyd Stadium; Whitney, NV	mtn.	L 16–42	16,111	
November 20	12:00 p.m.	Colorado State	War Memorial Stadium; Laramie, WY (Border War)	mtn.	W 44–0	17,011	
*Non-conference game; Rankings from AP Poll released prior to the game; All times are in Mountain time
