= 2010 TCU Horned Frogs football team =

American college football season

2010 TCU Horned Frogs football

National champion (CCR) Mountain West champion Rose Bowl champion

Rose Bowl, W 21–19 vs. Wisconsin
- Conference: Mountain West Conference

Ranking
- Coaches: No. 2
- AP: No. 2
- Record: 13–0 (8–0 MW)
- Head coach: Gary Patterson (10th season)
- Co-offensive coordinators: Jarrett Anderson (2nd season); Justin Fuente (2nd season)
- Offensive scheme: Spread
- Defensive coordinator: Dick Bumpas (7th season)
- Base defense: 4–2–5
- Home stadium: Amon G. Carter Stadium

Uniform

2010 Mountain West Conference football standings
	Conf.			Overall
Team	W		L	W		L
No. 2 TCU $	8	–	0	13	–	0
Utah	7	–	1	10	–	3
Air Force	5	–	3	9	–	4
San Diego State	5	–	3	9	–	4
BYU	5	–	3	7	–	6
Colorado State	2	–	6	3	–	9
UNLV	2	–	6	2	–	11
Wyoming	1	–	7	3	–	9
New Mexico	1	–	7	1	–	11
$ – Conference champion and BCS representative as top non-AQ school to meet automatic qualification criteria; As of January 11, 2011; Rankings from AP Poll

The 2010 TCU Horned Frogs football team represented Texas Christian University (TCU) in the 2010 NCAA Division I FBS football season. The team was coached by tenth-year head coach Gary Patterson and played its home games at Amon G. Carter Stadium in Fort Worth, Texas. They were members of the Mountain West Conference and were defending conference champions.

After a perfect regular season record, another Mountain West title and a #3 BCS ranking, the team was selected by the Pasadena Tournament of Roses to play Wisconsin of the Big Ten Conference in the 97th edition of the Rose Bowl. They defeated the Badgers 21–19, capping off their first undefeated and untied season since 1938, and only the second overall in the school's 115-year football history. The Congrove Computer Rankings, an NCAA-designated major selector, selected TCU as national champion.

TCU finished the regular season as the conference leader in scoring offense (520 points, 43.3 average) and scoring defense (137 points, 11.4 average). The Frogs were led by senior quarterback Andy Dalton, who completed 194 of 293 passes for 2638 yards for 26 touchdowns, and tailback Ed Wesley, who carried for 162 times for 1,065 yards and scored 11 touchdowns.

== Schedule ==
Date	Time	Opponent	Rank	Site	TV	Result	Attendance	Source
September 4	6:45 p.m.	vs. No. 24 Oregon State*	No. 6	Cowboys Stadium; Arlington, TX (Cowboys Classic)	ESPN	W 30–21	46,138	
September 11	6:00 p.m.	Tennessee Tech*	No. 4	Amon G. Carter Stadium; Fort Worth, TX		W 62–7	37,117	
September 18	3:30 p.m.	Baylor*	No. 4	Amon G. Carter Stadium; Fort Worth, TX (rivalry)	Versus	W 45–10	47,493	
September 24	7:00 p.m.	at SMU*	No. 4	Gerald J. Ford Stadium; University Park, TX (rivalry)	ESPN	W 41–24	35,481	
October 2	1:00 p.m.	at Colorado State	No. 5	Hughes Stadium; Fort Collins, CO	the mtn.	W 27–0	22,553	
October 9	2:30 p.m.	Wyoming	No. 5	Amon G. Carter Stadium; Fort Worth, TX	CBSCS	W 45–0	38,081	
October 16	3:00 p.m.	BYU	No. 4	Amon G. Carter Stadium; Fort Worth, TX	Versus	W 31–3	40,416	
October 23	7:00 p.m.	Air Force^{†}	No. 4	Amon G. Carter Stadium; Fort Worth, TX	CBSCS	W 38–7	46,096	
October 30	10:00 p.m.	at UNLV	No. 4	Sam Boyd Stadium; Whitney, NV	CBSCS	W 48–6	16,745	
November 6	2:30 p.m.	at No. 6 Utah	No. 4	Rice–Eccles Stadium; Salt Lake City, UT (College GameDay)	CBSCS	W 47–7	46,522	
November 13	3:00 p.m.	San Diego State	No. 3	Amon G. Carter Stadium; Fort Worth, TX	Versus	W 40–35	45,694	
November 27	3:00 p.m.	at New Mexico	No. 4	University Stadium; Albuquerque, NM	Versus	W 66–17	18,640	
January 1, 2011	4:10 p.m.	vs. No. 4 Wisconsin*	No. 3	Rose Bowl; Pasadena, CA (Rose Bowl, College GameDay)	ESPN, ESPN 3D	W 21–19	94,118	
*Non-conference game; ^{†}Homecoming; Rankings from AP Poll released prior to the game; All times are in Central time

== Rankings ==
Ranking movements Legend: ██ Increase in ranking ██ Decrease in ranking ( ) = First-place votes
	Week															
Poll	Pre	1	2	3	4	5	6	7	8	9	10	11	12	13	14	Final
AP	6	4	4	4	5	5	4 (1)	4 (3)	4 (2)	4 (2)	3 (2)	4 (1)	4	3 (1)	3 (1)	2 (3)
Coaches	7	5	5	5	5	5	5 (1)	4 (1)	4 (1)	4 (1)	3 (2)	4 (2)	4 (2)	3 (3)	3 (1)	2 (1)
Harris	Not released						4	3 (3)	4 (3)	4	3 (5)	4 (3)	4 (1)	3 (2)	3 (1)	Not released
BCS	Not released							5	4	3	3	3	3	3	3	Not released

== Game summaries ==
=== Oregon State ===
#24 Oregon State vs. #6 TCU

Team	1	2	3	4	Total
Oregon State	7	7	7	0	21
• TCU	7	14	7	2	30

- Date: September 4
- Location: Cowboys Stadium, Arlington, TX
- Game start: 7:45 p.m. EST
- TV announcers (ESPN): Brad Nessler, Todd Blackledge and Holly Rowe

Scoring summary
1	11:48	OSU	James Rodgers 30 yard pass from Ryan Katz (Justin Kahut kick)	OSU 7–0
1	7:19	TCU	Andy Dalton 6 yard run (Ross Evans kick)	Tied 7–7
2	11:57	OSU	Jordan Bishop 34 yard pass from Ryan Katz (Justin Kahut kick)	OSU 14–7
2	8:39	TCU	Jeremy Kerley 1 yard pass from Andy Dalton (Ross Evans kick)	Tied 14–14
2	0:49	TCU	Ed Wesley 8 yard run (Ross Evans kick)	TCU 21–14
3	5:33	OSU	Jacquizz Rodgers 1 yard run (Justin Kahut kick)	Tied 21–21
3	0:59	TCU	Andy Dalton 4 yard run (Ross Evans kick)	TCU 28–21
4	4:14	TCU	Safety, Ryan Katz kicked ball through end zone	TCU 30–21

Andy Dalton won his 30th career victory as TCU's starting quarterback, surpassing the school record of Sammy Baugh.

=== Rose Bowl ===
2011 Rose Bowl

Team	1	2	3	4	Total
Wisconsin	10	3	0	6	19
• TCU	14	0	7	0	21

- Date: January 1
- Location: Rose Bowl, Pasadena, CA
- Game start: 5:00 p.m. EST
- TV announcers (ABC): Brent Musburger & Kirk Herbstreit

Scoring summary
1	10:39	WIS	Philip Welch 39-yard field goal	WIS 3–0
1	6:15	TCU	Bart Johnson 23-yard pass from Andy Dalton (Ross Evans kick)	TCU 7–3
1	3:14	WIS	John Clay 1-yard run (Philip Welch kick)	WIS 10–7
1	0:36	TCU	Andy Dalton 4-yard run (Ross Evans kick)	TCU 14–10
2	0:00	WIS	Philip Welch 37-yard field goal	TCU 14–13
3	11:56	TCU	Luke Shivers 1-yard run (Ross Evans kick)	TCU 21–13
4	2:00	WIS	Montee Ball 4-yard run (pass failed)	TCU 21–19

The Horned Frogs made their way to Pasadena as the first team from a BCS non-AQ conference school to play in the Rose Bowl in the BCS era. The team has recorded two consecutive perfect regular seasons and has appeared in six straight bowl games. The Rose Bowl was their second consecutive BCS bowl game.

Both teams scored double digit points in the first quarter, a Rose Bowl record. The game was close throughout, and was not decided until Wisconsin failed to convert a two-point conversion late in the fourth quarter to tie the game. The game marks second time that the Rose Bowl was decided by two points, joining the 1966 game (UCLA 14, Michigan State 12).

== Roster ==
2010 TCU Horned Frogs football team roster
Players
Coaches
Offense

Pos.	#	Name	Class
WR	82	Josh Boyce	So
TE	80	Logan Brock	Jr
OL	61	Marcus Cannon	Sr
QB	14	Andy Dalton	Sr
WR	88	Jimmy Young	Sr

Defense

Pos.	#	Name	Class
DB	41	Jonathan Anderson	Fr
DL	91	Matt Anderson	Fr
DB	7	Greg McCoy	Jr
S	16	Jurell Thompson	So

Special teams

Pos.	#	Name	Class

Head coach

- Gary Patterson

Coordinators/assistant coaches

Legend

- (C) Team captain
- (S) Suspended
- (I) Ineligible
- Injured
- Redshirt
