= 2010 New Mexico Lobos football team =

American college football season

2010 New Mexico Lobos football
- Conference: Mountain West Conference
- Record: 1–11 (1–7 MW)
- Head coach: Mike Locksley (2nd season)
- Offensive coordinator: Darrell Dickey (2nd season)
- Offensive scheme: Pro spread
- Defensive coordinator: Doug Mallory (2nd season)
- Base defense: 4–3
- Home stadium: University Stadium

2010 Mountain West Conference football standings
	Conf.			Overall
Team	W		L	W		L
No. 2 TCU $	8	–	0	13	–	0
Utah	7	–	1	10	–	3
Air Force	5	–	3	9	–	4
San Diego State	5	–	3	9	–	4
BYU	5	–	3	7	–	6
Colorado State	2	–	6	3	–	9
UNLV	2	–	6	2	–	11
Wyoming	1	–	7	3	–	9
New Mexico	1	–	7	1	–	11
$ – Conference champion and BCS representative as top non-AQ school to meet automatic qualification criteria; As of January 11, 2011; Rankings from AP Poll

The 2010 New Mexico Lobos football team represented the University of New Mexico as a member of the Mountain West Conference (MW) during the 2010 NCAA Division I FBS football season. Led by second-year head coach Mike Locksley, the Lobos compiled an overall record of 1–11 with a mark of 1–7 in conference play, tying for eighth place at the bottom of the MW standings. The team played home games at University Stadium in Albuquerque, New Mexico.

== Schedule ==
Date	Time	Opponent	Site	TV	Result	Attendance	Source
September 4	1:30 p.m.	at No. 7 Oregon*	Autzen Stadium; Eugene, OR	CSN NW	L 0–72	59,104	
September 11	6:00 p.m.	Texas Tech*	University Stadium; Albuquerque, NM	mtn.	L 17–52	25,734	
September 18	6:00 p.m.	No. 14 Utah	University Stadium; Albuquerque, NM	mtn.	L 14–56	23,940	
September 25	8:00 p.m.	at UNLV	Sam Boyd Stadium; Whitney, NV	mtn.	L 10–45	16,961	
October 2	4:00 p.m.	UTEP*^{†}	University Stadium; Albuquerque, NM	mtn.	L 20–38	22,511	
October 9	6:00 p.m.	at New Mexico State*	Aggie Memorial Stadium; Las Cruces, NM (Rio Grande Rivalry)	ESPN3	L 14–16	21,437	
October 23	8:00 p.m.	San Diego State	University Stadium; Albuquerque, NM	mtn.	L 20–30	16,488<	
October 30	4:00 p.m.	at Colorado State	Hughes Stadium; Fort Collins, CO	mtn.	L 14–38	18,266	
November 6	4:00 p.m.	Wyoming	University Stadium; Albuquerque, NM	mtn.	W 34–31	18,017	
November 13	4:00 p.m.	at Air Force	Falcon Stadium; Colorado Springs, CO	the mtn.	L 23–48	27,309	
November 20	4:00 p.m.	at BYU	LaVell Edwards Stadium; Provo, UT	the mtn.	L 7–40	59,077	
November 27	2:00 p.m.	No. 4 TCU	University Stadium; Albuquerque, NM	Versus	L 17–66	18,640	
*Non-conference game; ^{†}Homecoming; Rankings from AP Poll released prior to the game; All times are in Mountain time
