= 2010 BYU Cougars football team =

American college football season

2010 BYU Cougars football

New Mexico Bowl champion

New Mexico Bowl, W 52–24 vs. UTEP
- Conference: Mountain West Conference
- Record: 7–6 (5–3 MW)
- Head coach: Bronco Mendenhall (6th season)
- Offensive coordinator: Robert Anae (6th season)
- Offensive scheme: Air raid
- Defensive coordinator: Jaime Hill (3rd season)
- Base defense: 3–4
- Captains: Matt Reynolds; Andrew Rich
- Home stadium: LaVell Edwards Stadium

Uniform

2010 Mountain West Conference football standings
| | Conf. | | | Overall |
| Team | W | | L | W | | L |
|---|---|---|---|---|---|---|
| No. 2 TCU $ | 8 | – | 0 | 13 | – | 0 |
| Utah | 7 | – | 1 | 10 | – | 3 |
| Air Force | 5 | – | 3 | 9 | – | 4 |
| San Diego State | 5 | – | 3 | 9 | – | 4 |
| BYU | 5 | – | 3 | 7 | – | 6 |
| Colorado State | 2 | – | 6 | 3 | – | 9 |
| UNLV | 2 | – | 6 | 2 | – | 11 |
| Wyoming | 1 | – | 7 | 3 | – | 9 |
| New Mexico | 1 | – | 7 | 1 | – | 11 |
$ – Conference champion and BCS representative as top non-AQ school to meet automatic qualification criteria; As of January 11, 2011; Rankings from AP Poll

The 2010 BYU Cougars football team represented Brigham Young University in the 2010 NCAA Division I FBS football season. The Cougars, led by head coach Bronco Mendenhall, played their home games at LaVell Edwards Stadium and were members of the Mountain West Conference. They finished the season 7–6, 5–3 in Mountain West play and were invited to the New Mexico Bowl where they defeated UTEP 52–24.

2010 was BYU's final season as a member of the Mountain West as started competing as an Independent in football beginning in 2011 with all other sports joining the West Coast Conference.

== Pre-season ==
=== Recruiting ===
In the preseason, the Cougars had many talented prospects come in. No.1 rated QB by rivals.com, Jake Heaps, joined the team, along with three players from The Oakridge School, Ross Apo, Tayo Fabuluje, and Teu Kautai

=== Media Poll ===
At the Mountain West media days on July 27, BYU was picked by 31 voters to finish 3rd in the conference behind TCU and Utah. Offensive linemen Matt Reynolds and free safety Andrew Rich were both named to the pre-season all-conference team.

=== Conference Re-alignment ===
The Cougars weren't directly affected by conference expansion in June, but will lose conference rival (effective Fall 2011) Utah to the newly formed Pac-12. Before Utah was invited to the older Pac-10 conference, Boise State agreed to leave the WAC and join the MWC in 2011. Rumors began circulating afterward about whether the BYU-Utah rivalry would survive the transition. On August 31, the BYU Athletic Department issued a press release that BYU would leave the Mountain West Conference next year, go independent in football beginning with the 2011 season and join the West Coast Conference for all other sports.

== Schedule ==
| Date | Time | Opponent | Site | TV | Result | Attendance |
|---|---|---|---|---|---|---|
| September 4 | 5:00 p.m. | Washington* | LaVell Edwards Stadium; Provo, UT | CBSCS | W 23–17 | 63,771 |
| September 11 | 2:00 p.m. | at Air Force | Falcon Stadium; Colorado Springs, CO | Versus | L 14–35 | 46,692 |
| September 18 | 1:30 p.m. | at Florida State* | Bobby Bowden Field at Doak Campbell Stadium; Tallahassee, FL | ESPNU | L 10–34 | 68,795 |
| September 25 | 4:00 p.m. | Nevada* | LaVell Edwards Stadium; Provo, UT | The Mtn. | L 13–27 | 61,471 |
| October 1 | 6:00 p.m. | at Utah State* | Romney Stadium; Logan, UT (Old Wagon Wheel) | ESPN | L 16–31 | 24,152 |
| October 9 | 4:00 p.m. | San Diego State^{†} | LaVell Edwards Stadium; Provo, UT | The Mtn. | W 24–21 | 62,176 |
| October 16 | 2:00 p.m. | at No. 4 TCU | Amon G. Carter Stadium; Fort Worth, TX | Versus | L 3–31 | 40,416 |
| October 23 | 12:00 p.m. | Wyoming | LaVell Edwards Stadium; Provo, UT | The mtn. | W 25–20 | 60,505 |
| November 6 | 12:00 p.m. | UNLV | LaVell Edwards Stadium; Provo, UT | The mtn. | W 55–7 | 61,283 |
| November 13 | 12:00 p.m. | at Colorado State | Sonny Lubick Field at Hughes Stadium; Fort Collins, CO | The mtn. | W 49–10 | 16,501 |
| November 20 | 4:00 p.m. | New Mexico | LaVell Edwards Stadium; Provo, UT | The mtn. | W 40–7 | 59,077 |
| November 27 | 1:30 p.m. | at No. 23 Utah | Rice-Eccles Stadium; Salt Lake City, UT (Holy War) | The mtn./CBSCS | L 16–17 | 45,272 |
| December 18 | 12:00 p.m. | vs. UTEP* | University Stadium; Albuquerque, NM (New Mexico Bowl) | ESPN | W 52–24 | 32,424 |
*Non-conference game; ^{†}Homecoming; Rankings from AP Poll released prior to the game; All times are in Mountain time

== Season ==
Defensive Coordinator, Jaime Hill was fired the day after BYU lost to Utah State, BYU's fourth loss of the season after only playing five games. BYU had not started the season with a 1–4 record since 1973. After the firing of Hill, linebacker coach Nick Howell was moved to coach the secondary and Kelly Poppinga was promoted from graduate assistant to coach the linebackers.

== Game summaries ==
=== Washington ===
BYU opened the season with Y Quarterback Weekend. During Y Quarterback Weekend all 8 All-American quarterbacks, including Washington head coach Steve Sarkisian, returned and were recognized for their outstanding achievements while at BYU.

Washington at BYU

| Team | 1 | 2 | 3 | 4 | Total |
|---|---|---|---|---|---|
| Huskies | 7 | 10 | 0 | 0 | 17 |
| • Cougars | 5 | 8 | 10 | 0 | 23 |

- Date: September 4
- Location: LaVell Edwards Stadium
  Provo, UT
- Game start: 5:04 pm MST
- Elapsed time: 3:24
- Game attendance: 63,771
- Game weather: 92 °F (33 °C), Clear, winds SSW 8 mph
- Referee: Terry Leyden
- TV announcers (CBS-C): Dave Ryan, Aaron Taylor, & Brooke Olzendam

It was a back and forth battle mostly through the air between the Cougars and the Huskies. Jake Locker threw for 266 yards. Nelson and Jake Heaps combined to throw for 262 yards, 131 each. In his first start in four years though, Riley Nelson threw for 2 touchdowns while the Cougars defense swarmed Washington forcing a safety. No turnovers occurred in the game, but BYU managed to come from behind to defeat the Huskies. The win over the Huskies evened up the series between the Cougars and the Huskies at 4–4.

Scoring summary

| Quarter | Time | Drive | | | Team | Scoring information | Score | |
| Quarter | Time | Plays | Yards | TOP | Team | Scoring information | Washington | BYU |
|---|---|---|---|---|---|---|---|---|
| 1 | 10:02 | 7 | 73 | 3:03 | Washington | J. Kearse 19-yard touchdown reception from Jake Locker, Eric Folk kick good | 7 | 0 |
| 1 | 4:30 | | | | BYU | Will Mahan rushed for −15 yards & fumbled the ball. Wash recovered fumble in the endzone where they were touched down for the safety. | 7 | 2 |
| 1 | 00:31 | 9 | 66 | 3:53 | BYU | 22-yard field goal by Mitch Payne | 7 | 5 |
| 2 | 12:08 | 8 | 47 | 2:36 | BYU | Josh Quezada 19-yard touchdown reception from Riley Nelson, 2-point run (Riley Nelson) good | 7 | 13 |
| 2 | 5:09 | 9 | 80 | 3:25 | Washington | Jake Locker 9-yard touchdown run, Eric Folk kick good | 14 | 13 |
| 2 | 00:00 | 11 | 63 | 1:55 | Washington | 54-yard field goal by Eric Folk | 17 | 13 |
| 3 | 6:59 | 11 | 58 | 5:33 | BYU | 29-yard field goal by Mitch Payne | 17 | 16 |
| 3 | 4:23 | 3 | 48 | 0:56 | BYU | JJ Di Luigi 48-yard touchdown reception from Riley Nelson, Mitch Payne kick good | 17 | 23 |
| "TOP" = time of possession. For other American football terms, see Glossary of American football. | | | | | | | 17 | 23 |

=== Air Force ===
BYU entered into their second game of the season with a 5-game winning streak against the Air Force Falcons.

BYU at Air Force

| Team | 1 | 2 | 3 | 4 | Total |
|---|---|---|---|---|---|
| Cougars | 14 | 0 | 0 | 0 | 14 |
| • Falcons | 7 | 14 | 7 | 7 | 35 |

- Date: September 11
- Location: Falcon Stadium
  Colorado Springs, CO
- Game start: 2:06 pm MST
- Elapsed time: 3:02
- Game attendance: 46,692
- Game weather: 70 °F (21 °C), Clear and Sunny, winds SSE 18 mph
- Referee: Karl Richins
- TV announcers (Versus): Joe Beninati, Kelly Stouffer, & Lindy Thackston

The first quarter played out like most people expected the game would, all offense and very little defense. BYU had 44 yards passing to Air Force's 46. BYU had two touchdowns to Air Force's one. However, the Air Force defense would turn it on in the second quarter. Nelson and Heaps would combine to throw for only 44 more yards through the final three quarters while Air Force racked up 409 rushing yards. With the turnovers that BYU had, the game would turn into a blowout in favor of the Falcons. The Falcons had only won 6 of the 30 meetings between the teams going into 2010, but they got the last laugh before BYU left for Independence and cut the series to 24–7.

Scoring summary

| Quarter | Time | Drive | | | Team | Scoring information | Score | |
| Quarter | Time | Plays | Yards | TOP | Team | Scoring information | BYU | AFA |
|---|---|---|---|---|---|---|---|---|
| 1 | 9:43 | 12 | 74 | 5:21 | BYU | JJ Di Luigi 1-yard touchdown run, Mitch Payne kick good | 7 | 0 |
| 1 | 8:34 | 5 | 61 | 1:05 | Air Force | Mikel Hunter 37-yard touchdown reception from Tim Jefferson, Erik Soderberg kick good | 7 | 7 |
| 1 | 2:29 | 5 | 49 | 2:43 | BYU | Riley Nelson 4-yard touchdown run, Mitch Payne kick good | 14 | 7 |
| 2 | 9:42 | 17 | 80 | 7:56 | Air Force | Tim Jefferson 5-yard touchdown run, Erik Soderberg kick good | 14 | 14 |
| 2 | 5:17 | 2 | 48 | 0:40 | Air Force | Mikel Hunter 33-yard touchdown run, Erik Soderberg kick good | 14 | 21 |
| 3 | 2:24 | 9 | 76 | 3:56 | Air Force | Jon Warzeka 46-yard touchdown run, Erik Soderberg kick good | 14 | 28 |
| 4 | 12:34 | 5 | 45 | 2:15 | BYU | Nathan Walker 5-yard touchdown run, Erik Soderberg kick good | 14 | 35 |
| "TOP" = time of possession. For other American football terms, see Glossary of American football. | | | | | | | 14 | 35 |

=== Florida State ===
It the contest of 2010 was a road trip to Florida State, a team BYU was 0–3 against in their school's history. Previous contests took place in 1991, 2000, and 2009.

BYU at Florida State

| Team | 1 | 2 | 3 | 4 | Total |
|---|---|---|---|---|---|
| Cougars | 0 | 10 | 0 | 0 | 10 |
| • Seminoles | 3 | 10 | 14 | 7 | 34 |

- Date: September 18
- Location: Bobby Bowden Field at Doak Campbell Stadium
  Tallahassee, FL
- Game start: 1:36 pm MST
- Elapsed time: 3:13
- Game attendance: 68,795
- Game weather: 93 °F (34 °C), Fair Skies w/ Humidity at 36%, winds ENE 9 mph
- Referee: Dan Romeo
- TV announcers (ESPNU; Touchdown Radio Productions): Pam Ward and Danny Kanell (ESPNU); Frank Fangie, Gino Torretta, & Roxy Bernstein (Touchdown Radio Productions)

In a battle where both offenses struggled, the Seminoles defense came up with the last laugh. Florida State had eight sacks, forced six punts, and made BYU turnover the ball twice, both leading to points that helped the Seminoles pull away for the win. The loss wasn't the only bad news for BYU. The following Monday QB Riley Nelson had an MRI. It was revealed that he suffered a shoulder injury during the FSU game, and it would require five to six months of surgery and rehab before he would be able to play again. The NCAA would grant Nelson a medical redshirt, allowing him to be a senior in 2012 instead of 2011.

Scoring summary

| Quarter | Time | Drive | | | Team | Scoring information | Score | |
| Quarter | Time | Plays | Yards | TOP | Team | Scoring information | BYU | FSU |
|---|---|---|---|---|---|---|---|---|
| 1 | 0:39 | 10 | 62 | 4:49 | Florida State | 26-yard field goal by Dustin Hopkins | 0 | 3 |
| 2 | 9:56 | 4 | -9 | 1:24 | Florida State | 47-yard field goal by Dustin Hopkins | 0 | 6 |
| 2 | 7:40 | 1 | 83 | 0:14 | Florida State | Chris Thompson 83-yard touchdown run, Dustin Hopkins kick good | 0 | 13 |
| 2 | 4:26 | 7 | 49 | 3:20 | BYU | 28-yard field goal by Mitch Payne | 3 | 13 |
| 2 | 0:14 | 11 | 71 | 2:00 | BYU | Cody Hoffman 4-yard touchdown reception from Jake Heaps, Mitch Payne kick good | 10 | 13 |
| 3 | 7:16 | 14 | 63 | 6:53 | Florida State | Ty Jones 2-yard touchdown reception from Christian Ponder, Dustin Hopkins kick good | 10 | 20 |
| 3 | 0:55 | 4 | 86 | 1:37 | Florida State | Christian Ponder 1-yard touchdown run, Dustin Hopkins kick good | 10 | 27 |
| 4 | 1:35 | 4 | 7 | 2:23 | Florida State | Ty Jones 9-yard touchdown run, Dustin Hopkins kick good | 10 | 34 |
| "TOP" = time of possession. For other American football terms, see Glossary of American football. | | | | | | | 10 | 34 |

=== Nevada ===
The Cougars returned home with a new full-time starting QB in Jake Heaps knowing they would face a high powered Nevada team. BYU and Nevada had met 3 times previously, with BYU owning a 2–1 advantage.

Nevada at BYU

| Team | 1 | 2 | 3 | 4 | Total |
|---|---|---|---|---|---|
| • Wolf Pack | 14 | 10 | 0 | 3 | 27 |
| Cougars | 7 | 3 | 0 | 3 | 13 |

- Date: September 25
- Location: LaVell Edwards Stadium
  Provo, UT
- Game start: 4:06 pm MST
- Elapsed time: 3:09
- Game attendance: 61,471
- Game weather: 74 °F (23 °C), Sunny, winds WSW 7 mph
- Referee: Marvel July
- TV announcers (Mtn.): Ari Wolfe, Blaine Fowler, & Sammy Linebaugh

Nevada held BYU to 320-yards of total offense in Jake Heaps first start. JJ Di Luigi rushed for 68 yards and scored BYU's lone touchdown. Only 1 turnover was forced the entire game, an Interception that allowed BYU to tie the game up, but Colin Kaepernick threw for 196 yards and effectively allowed the Wolf Pack runners to scramble throughout the game. Despite outpassing the Wolf Pack (229 to 196), BYU would fall to 1–3.

Scoring summary

| Quarter | Time | Drive | | | Team | Scoring information | Score | |
| Quarter | Time | Plays | Yards | TOP | Team | Scoring information | Nevada | BYU |
|---|---|---|---|---|---|---|---|---|
| 1 | 10:16 | 9 | 84 | 4:44 | Nevada | Courtney Randall 6-yard touchdown reception from Colin Kaepernick, Anthony Martinez kick good | 7 | 0 |
| 1 | 7:04 | 5 | 36 | 1:31 | BYU | JJ Di Luigi 2-yard touchdown run, Mitch Payne kick good | 7 | 7 |
| 1 | 1:39 | 12 | 80 | 5:36 | Nevada | Vai Taua 1-yard touchdown run, Anthony Martinez kick good | 14 | 7 |
| 2 | 9:18 | 9 | 57 | 4:48 | Nevada | Colin Kaepernick 4-yard touchdown run, Anthony Martinez kick good | 21 | 7 |
| 2 | 1:20 | 11 | 35 | 3:04 | BYU | 27-yard field goal by Mitch Payne | 21 | 10 |
| 2 | 0:00 | 9 | 55 | 1:23 | Nevada | 38-yard field goal by Ricky Drake | 24 | 10 |
| 4 | 11:27 | 21 | 75 | 8:58 | Nevada | 29-yard field goal by Anthony Martinez | 27 | 10 |
| 4 | 7:46 | 9 | 65 | 3:36 | BYU | 29-yard field goal by Mitch Payne | 27 | 13 |
| "TOP" = time of possession. For other American football terms, see Glossary of American football. | | | | | | | 27 | 13 |

=== Utah State ===
The Battle for the Old Wagon Wheel headed to Logan in 2010 with BYU having won 10 straight, with Bronco Mendenhall having never lost to the Aggies, and with BYU having not scored less than 30-points against the Aggies since 1982. With the start freshman Jake Heaps became the third freshman to have started more than one game as starting QB at BYU. All good things must come to an end though.

BYU at Utah State

| Team | 1 | 2 | 3 | 4 | Total |
|---|---|---|---|---|---|
| Cougars | 0 | 3 | 7 | 6 | 16 |
| • Aggies | 10 | 14 | 7 | 0 | 31 |

- Date: October 1
- Location: Romney Stadium
  Logan, UT
- Game start: 6:06 pm MST
- Elapsed time: 3:22
- Game attendance: 24,152
- Game weather: Warm and clear
- Referee: Terry Leyden
- TV announcers (ESPN): Joe Tessitore and Rod Gilmore

A 31–16 thumping at the hands of Utah State completed the Cougars non-conference season. With Utah and TCU still to go on the schedule, people began to wonder if the Cougars had any heart or if they could get bowl eligible. The defense was ranked 102nd in the nation, and the offense wasn't moving the ball past midfield. Jake Heaps was averaging more than 200-yards a game passing, but it wasn't resulting in points. Independence for 2011 seemed to be all forgotten.

Scoring summary

| Quarter | Time | Drive | | | Team | Scoring information | Score | |
| Quarter | Time | Plays | Yards | TOP | Team | Scoring information | BYU | USU |
|---|---|---|---|---|---|---|---|---|
| 1 | 6:57 | 2 | 81 | 0:51 | Utah State | Xavier Martin 79-yard touchdown reception from Diondre Borel, Braeden Loveless kick good | 0 | 7 |
| 1 | 00:27 | 10 | 36 | 4:16 | Utah State | 34-yard field goal by Braeden Loveless | 0 | 10 |
| 2 | 6:54 | 12 | 62 | 4:43 | Utah State | Diondre Borel 1-yard touchdown run, Braeden Loveless kick good | 0 | 17 |
| 2 | 3:28 | 9 | 48 | 3:29 | BYU | 23-yard field goal by Mitch Payne | 3 | 17 |
| 2 | 0:49 | 7 | 33 | 2:33 | Utah State | Derrvin Speight 1-yard touchdown run, Braeden Loveless kick good | 3 | 24 |
| 3 | 6:32 | 12 | 69 | 4:45 | Utah State | Derrvin Speight 1-yard touchdown run, Braeden Loveless kick good | 3 | 31 |
| 3 | 3:44 | 8 | 75 | 2:41 | BYU | Bryan Kariya 1-yard touchdown run, Matt Payne kick good | 10 | 31 |
| 4 | 00:31 | 8 | 66 | 1:42 | BYU | JJ Di Luigi 3-yard touchdown run, Matt Payne kick no good | 16 | 31 |
| "TOP" = time of possession. For other American football terms, see Glossary of American football. | | | | | | | 16 | 31 |

=== San Diego State ===
BYU came into the series with the Aztecs holding a 26–7–1 record and knowing that San Diego State had never won two in a row against the Cougars. They also knew that if they lost, all chances of a bowl game would be crushed.

San Diego State at BYU

| Team | 1 | 2 | 3 | 4 | Total |
|---|---|---|---|---|---|
| Aztecs | 0 | 7 | 7 | 7 | 21 |
| • Cougars | 14 | 0 | 3 | 7 | 24 |

- Date: October 9
- Location: LaVell Edwards Stadium
  Provo, UT
- Game start: 4:06 pm MST
- Elapsed time: 3:04
- Game attendance: 62,176
- Game weather: 60 °F (16 °C), Cloudy, winds WNW 7 mph
- Referee: Greg Burks
- TV announcers (Mtn.): Ari Wolfe, Blaine Fowler, & Sammy Linebaugh

A hard-fought homecoming game was overshadowed due to an ugly replay incident in the fourth quarter. A relatively obvious fumble that would have given San Diego State the ball and prevented a BYU touchdown was ruled instead to be BYU's ball. Replay officials agreed with the call, despite its obvious incorrectness. Following the game, accusations of partisanship were levelled against the replay officials because one of the men in the booth was a BYU employee. This was standard procedure at the time, and the lead replay official, who was the one who actually decided to uphold the call on the field, was a resident of Reno, Nevada with no connection to BYU. Despite this, the negative reaction to the incident was significant enough that three MWC officials were suspended and a new rule was put into place by the MWC which stated that alumni could no longer officiate games involving their alma mater, even if they were only assigned to the replay booth. BYU would go on to drive for a TD which gave them the 24–21 win.

Scoring summary

| Quarter | Time | Drive | | | Team | Scoring information | Score | |
| Quarter | Time | Plays | Yards | TOP | Team | Scoring information | SDSU | BYU |
|---|---|---|---|---|---|---|---|---|
| 1 | 4:57 | 19 | 78 | 8:34 | BYU | JJ Di Luigi 3-yard touchdown run, Mitch Payne kick good | 0 | 7 |
| 1 | 2:02 | 5 | 24 | 2:40 | BYU | Bryan Kariya 3-yard touchdown run, Mitch Payne kick good | 0 | 14 |
| 2 | 5:00 | 2 | 52 | 0:31 | San Diego State | Vincent Brown 36-yard touchdown reception from Ryan Lindley, Abel Perez kick good | 7 | 14 |
| 3 | 6:21 | 8 | 38 | 4:22 | BYU | 29-yard field goal by Mitch Payne | 7 | 17 |
| 3 | 3:43 | 8 | 83 | 2:38 | San Diego State | Gavin Escobar 1-yard touchdown reception from Ryan Lindley, Abel Perez kick good | 14 | 17 |
| 4 | 13:43 | 9 | 67 | 4:51 | BYU | Bryan Kariya 1-yard touchdown run, Mitch Payne kick good | 14 | 24 |
| 4 | 6:27 | 6 | 59 | 2:38 | San Diego State | Brand Sullivan 4-yard touchdown reception from Ryan Lindley, Abel Perez kick good | 21 | 24 |
| "TOP" = time of possession. For other American football terms, see Glossary of American football. | | | | | | | 21 | 24 |

=== TCU ===
BYU headed to Fort Worth for the tenth meeting with the Horned Frogs holding a 5–4 advantage in the overall series.

BYU at #4 TCU

| Team | 1 | 2 | 3 | 4 | Total |
|---|---|---|---|---|---|
| Cougars | 0 | 0 | 3 | 0 | 3 |
| • Horned Frogs | 3 | 14 | 0 | 14 | 31 |

- Date: October 16
- Location: Amon G. Carter Stadium
  Ft. Worrth, TX
- Game start: 2:06 pm MST
- Elapsed time: 2:53
- Game attendance: 40,416
- Game weather: 84 °F (29 °C), Sunny with Clear Skies, winds S 15 mph
- Referee: Tom Walker
- TV announcers (Versus): Joe Beninati, Kelly Stouffler, & Lindsay Soto

The Cougars went into Ft. Worth having one main goal- show improvement over their other losses. They knew many people wouldn't pick them to win, and they knew Heaps wasn't producing as well on the road. BYU's defense showed remarkable improvement over early in the year, giving up only 3 points in the first 29 minutes. However offensive turnovers late in the first half put the BYU defense in a bad spot. The offense's ineptitude at moving the ball (only 147 yards for the game) led to BYU's downfall.

Scoring summary

| Quarter | Time | Drive | | | Team | Scoring information | Score | |
| Quarter | Time | Plays | Yards | TOP | Team | Scoring information | BYU | TCU |
|---|---|---|---|---|---|---|---|---|
| 1 | 3:27 | 7 | 39 | 3:27 | TCU | 20-yard field goal by Ross Evans | 0 | 3 |
| 2 | 1:30 | 2 | 46 | 0:20 | TCU | Josh Boyce 35-yard touchdown reception from Andy Dalton, Ross Evans kick good | 0 | 10 |
| 2 | 0:26 | 3 | 38 | 0:54 | TCU | Jimmy Young 14-yard touchdown reception from Andy Dalton, Ross Evans kick good | 0 | 17 |
| 3 | 1:14 | 14 | 70 | 5:42 | BYU | 27-yard field goal by Mitch Payne | 3 | 17 |
| 4 | 10:03 | 8 | 64 | 3:47 | TCU | Josh Boyce 20-yard touchdown reception from Andy Dalton, Ross Evans kick good | 3 | 24 |
| 4 | 4:26 | 9 | 51 | 4:41 | TCU | Jeremy Kerley 21-yard touchdown reception from Andy Dalton, Ross Evans kick good | 3 | 31 |
| "TOP" = time of possession. For other American football terms, see Glossary of American football. | | | | | | | 3 | 31 |

=== Wyoming ===
Needing to win 4 of the last 5 games to become bowl eligible, BYU began its quest against a Cowboys team that hadn't scored against BYU for the past 9 regulation quarters. Since 2006, BYU had owned the series against Wyoming by a score of 46.5–4.3 per game, and BYU led the overall series 43–30–3.

Wyoming at BYU

| Team | 1 | 2 | 3 | 4 | Total |
|---|---|---|---|---|---|
| Cowboys | 0 | 10 | 3 | 7 | 20 |
| • Cougars | 16 | 0 | 3 | 6 | 25 |

- Date: October 23
- Location: LaVell Edwards Stadium
  Provo, UT
- Game start: 12:06 pm MST
- Elapsed time: 2:56
- Game attendance: 60,505
- Game weather: 48 °F (9 °C), Cloudy with some rain, winds N 5 mph
- Referee: Alan Eck
- TV announcers (Mtn.): James Bates, Todd Christensen, & Toby Christensen

The Cougars defense dominated the game and held Wyoming to less than 200 yards. Turnovers on the offensive end kept the game close. It would take a last possession stand by the Cougar D to secure their third win of the year.

Scoring summary

| Quarter | Time | Drive | | | Team | Scoring information | Score | |
| Quarter | Time | Plays | Yards | TOP | Team | Scoring information | Wyoming | BYU |
|---|---|---|---|---|---|---|---|---|
| 1 | 10:35 | 10 | 58 | 4:25 | BYU | JJ Di Luigi 7-yard touchdown run, Mitch Payne kick good | 0 | 7 |
| 1 | 9:53 | | | | BYU | Wyoming fumble for −15 yards, recovered in the end zone by Wyoming for a BYU safety. | 0 | 9 |
| 1 | 4:53 | 5 | 33 | 2:01 | BYU | Bryan Kariya 4-yard touchdown run, Mitch Payne kick good | 0 | 16 |
| 2 | 3:50 | | | | Wyoming | Interception returned 55 yards for touchdown by Keith Lewis, Ian Watts kick good | 7 | 16 |
| 2 | 00:52 | 4 | -7 | 2:06 | Wyoming | 44-yard field goal by Ian Watts | 10 | 16 |
| 3 | 5:20 | 9 | 48 | 4:37 | BYU | 42-yard field goal by Mitch Payne | 10 | 19 |
| 3 | 00:30 | 11 | 56 | 5:10 | Wyoming | 38-yard field goal by Ian Watts | 13 | 19 |
| 4 | 12:34 | 7 | 70 | 2:31 | BYU | Luke Ashworth 12-yard touchdown reception from Jake Heaps, 2-point pass incomplete | 13 | 25 |
| 4 | 6:50 | 4 | 80 | 1:20 | Wyoming | Chris McNeil 16-yard touchdown reception from Austyn Carta-Samuels, Ian Watts kick good | 20 | 25 |
| "TOP" = time of possession. For other American football terms, see Glossary of American football. | | | | | | | 20 | 25 |

=== UNLV ===
After a bye week the Cougars returned to action to play UNLV for the final time as conference opponents. The series had largely been dominated by BYU (14–3), and 2010 would be the same.

UNLV at BYU

| Team | 1 | 2 | 3 | 4 | Total |
|---|---|---|---|---|---|
| Rebels | 0 | 0 | 0 | 7 | 7 |
| • Cougars | 14 | 24 | 14 | 3 | 55 |

- Date: November 6
- Location: LaVell Edwards Stadium
  Provo, UT
- Game start: 12:06 pm MST
- Elapsed time: 3:11
- Game attendance: 61,283
- Game weather: 57 °F (14 °C), Partly Cloudy, winds SW 5 mph
- Referee: Randy Christal
- TV announcers (Mtn.): Ari Wolfe, Blaine Fowler, & Sammy Linebaugh

In what can only be classified as a slaughter, BYU would thoroughly crush UNLV. They outgained the Rebels offensively 516 to 144. 70 of the Rebels yards came against BYU's second and third team players.

Scoring summary

| Quarter | Time | Drive | | | Team | Scoring information | Score | |
| Quarter | Time | Plays | Yards | TOP | Team | Scoring information | UNLV | BYU |
|---|---|---|---|---|---|---|---|---|
| 1 | 7:53 | 9 | 49 | 4:25 | BYU | Josh Quezada 13-yard touchdown run, Mitch Payne kick good | 0 | 7 |
| 1 | 2:31 | 11 | 86 | 4:19 | BYU | JJ Di Luigi 1-yard touchdown run, Mitch Payne kick good | 0 | 14 |
| 2 | 12:41 | 8 | 44 | 2:43 | BYU | JJ Di Luigi 1-yard touchdown run, Mitch Payne kick good | 0 | 21 |
| 2 | 9:27 | 2 | 58 | 0:26 | BYU | Cody Hoffman 37-yard touchdown reception from Jake Heaps, Mitch Payne kick good | 0 | 28 |
| 2 | 3:01 | 8 | 76 | 3:43 | BYU | Josh Quezada 1-yard touchdown run, Mitch Payne kick good | 0 | 35 |
| 2 | 00:00 | 5 | 23 | 0:47 | BYU | 48-yard field goal by Mitch Payne | 0 | 38 |
| 3 | 9:51 | 3 | 47 | 1:13 | BYU | Luke Ashworth 42-yard touchdown reception from Jake Heaps, Mitch Payne kick good | 0 | 45 |
| 3 | 1:26 | 10 | 68 | 4:24 | BYU | Josh Quezada 4-yard touchdown run, Mitch Payne kick good | 0 | 52 |
| 4 | 8:00 | 12 | 44 | 6:48 | BYU | 25-yard field goal by Mitch Payne | 0 | 55 |
| 4 | 0:41 | 11 | 70 | 2:36 | UNLV | Marcus Sullivan 24-yard touchdown reception from Caleb Herring, Ian Watts kick good | 7 | 55 |
| "TOP" = time of possession. For other American football terms, see Glossary of American football. | | | | | | | 7 | 55 |

=== Colorado State ===
With their first 2-game win streak in tow, BYU headed to Ft. Collins to face the Rams for the last time as MWC foes. It was the 69th meeting between the two schools, and BYU owned a 38–27–3 advantage in the series history.

BYU at Colorado State

| Team | 1 | 2 | 3 | 4 | Total |
|---|---|---|---|---|---|
| • Cougars | 14 | 21 | 7 | 7 | 49 |
| Rams | 0 | 0 | 0 | 10 | 10 |

- Date: November 13
- Location: Sonny Lubick Field at Hughes Stadium
  Ft. Collins, CO
- Game start: 12:06 pm MST
- Elapsed time: 2:47
- Game attendance: 16,501
- Game weather: 38 °F (3 °C), Cloudy, winds S 7 mph
- Referee: Land Clark
- TV announcers (Mtn.): Ari Wolfe, Blaine Fowler, & Roger Bailey

The Cougars suffered 2 turnovers, including one on their opening series, but they were nearly flawless. On third down they went 12-for-13. They racked up 526 yards total offense, including 396 with the starters. Corby Eason forced a fumble that Kyle Van Noy returned for a score. The Cougars dominated the Rams in virtually every fashion as they became one wni away from being bowl eligible with two games to play.

Scoring summary

| Quarter | Time | Drive | | | Team | Scoring information | Score | |
| Quarter | Time | Plays | Yards | TOP | Team | Scoring information | BYU | Colorado St. |
|---|---|---|---|---|---|---|---|---|
| 1 | 8:56 | 4 | 89 | 1:19 | BYU | Luke Ashworth 62-yard touchdown reception from Jake Heaps, Mitch Payne kick good | 7 | 0 |
| 1 | 3:36 | 7 | 44 | 3:42 | BYU | Luke Ashworth 7-yard touchdown reception from Jake Heaps, Mitch Payne kick good | 14 | 0 |
| 2 | 14:49 | | | | BYU | Fumble recovery returned 44 yards for touchdown by Kyle Van Noy, Mitch Payne kick good | 21 | 0 |
| 2 | 7:21 | 7 | 74 | 3:24 | BYU | Luke Ashworth 36-yard touchdown reception from Jake Heaps, Mitch Payne kick good | 28 | 0 |
| 2 | 0:27 | 9 | 82 | 3:53 | BYU | Luke Ashworth 8-yard touchdown reception from Jake Heaps, Mitch Payne kick good | 35 | 0 |
| 3 | 00:17 | 16 | 76 | 7:20 | BYU | Zed Mendenhall 1-yard touchdown run, Mitch Payne kick good | 42 | 0 |
| 4 | 7:58 | 15 | 63 | 7:19 | Colorado State | 34-yard field goal by Ben Deline | 42 | 3 |
| 4 | 5:49 | 4 | 59 | 2:03 | BYU | David Foote 31-yard touchdown run, Mitch Payne kick good | 49 | 3 |
| 4 | 3:07 | 8 | 80 | 2:42 | Colorado State | Raymond Carter 22-yard touchdown reception from Pete Thomas, Ben Deline kick good | 49 | 10 |
| "TOP" = time of possession. For other American football terms, see Glossary of American football. | | | | | | | 49 | 10 |

=== New Mexico ===
With their first 3-game win streak in tow, BYU returned home for Senior Day and a chance to become bowl eligible. Luke Ashworth came in as the FBS Player of the Week after his 4-TD performance against Colorado State. It was the 60th meeting between the two schools, and BYU owned a 44–14–1 advantage in the series history.

New Mexico at BYU

| Team | 1 | 2 | 3 | 4 | Total |
|---|---|---|---|---|---|
| Lobos | 0 | 0 | 7 | 0 | 7 |
| • Cougars | 17 | 3 | 7 | 13 | 40 |

- Date: November 20
- Location: LaVell Edwards Stadium
  Provo, UT
- Game start: 4:06 pm MST
- Elapsed time: 3:04
- Game attendance: 59,077
- Game weather: 48 °F (9 °C), Windy & Rain Likely, winds SSW 29 mph
- Referee: Cooper Castleberry
- TV announcers (Mtn.): Ari Wolfe, Blaine Fowler, & Sammy Linebaugh

The Cougars managed to have 0 turnovers, but the crowd wasn't pleased. The crowd booed many of the officials calls as the Cougs and Lobos played in the wind with a chance of rain. The Cougars managed to outgain the Lobos 494 to 259. The defense showed they had come a long way since the Utah State game as they entered the game as one of the Top 15 defenses in the nation since late October. Heaps would say the Cougars were peaking at the right time, and the Cougs walked away with another easy win to become bowl eligible.

Scoring summary

| Quarter | Time | Drive | | | Team | Scoring information | Score | |
| Quarter | Time | Plays | Yards | TOP | Team | Scoring information | UNM | BYU |
|---|---|---|---|---|---|---|---|---|
| 1 | 10:01 | 3 | 12 | 2:11 | BYU | Jake Heaps 1-yard touchdown run, Mitch Payne kick good | 0 | 7 |
| 1 | 7:07 | 5 | 21 | 1:06 | BYU | 34-yard field goal by Mitch Payne | 0 | 10 |
| 1 | 2:58 | 7 | 80 | 3:06 | BYU | JJ Di Luigi 4-yard touchdown run, Mitch Payne kick good | 0 | 17 |
| 2 | 00:35 | 16 | 84 | 6:14 | BYU | 28-yard field goal by Mitch Payne | 0 | 20 |
| 3 | 9:46 | 11 | 72 | 5:10 | BYU | Luke Ashworth 15-yard touchdown reception from Jake Heaps, Mitch Payne kick good | 0 | 27 |
| 3 | 4:14 | 13 | 72 | 5:36 | New Mexico | Quinte Solomon 12-yard touchdown reception from Stump Godfrey, James Aho kick good | 7 | 27 |
| 4 | 14:10 | 12 | 82 | 4:58 | BYU | Josh Quezada 14-yard touchdown run, Mitch Payne kick good | 7 | 34 |
| 4 | 7:17 | 10 | 80 | 4:58 | BYU | Cody Hoffman 10-yard touchdown reception from Jake Heaps, Mitch Payne kick no good | 7 | 40 |
| "TOP" = time of possession. For other American football terms, see Glossary of American football. | | | | | | | 7 | 40 |

=== Utah ===
Going into the final week of the season, the Cougars found themselves with a chance to win second place in the conference. The opponent standing in their way was their hated rival of the Deseret First Duel, the Utah Utes. Both BYU and Utah entered into the game having lost conference games to TCU, but a BYU win would give them the tiebreaker over Utah for second place.

BYU at #22 Utah

| Team | 1 | 2 | 3 | 4 | Total |
|---|---|---|---|---|---|
| Cougars | 3 | 3 | 7 | 3 | 16 |
| • Utes | 0 | 0 | 0 | 17 | 17 |

- Date: November 27
- Location: Rice-Eccles Stadium
  Salt Lake City, UT
- Game start: 1:37 pm MST
- Elapsed time: 3:08
- Game attendance: 45,272
- Game weather: 29 °F (−2 °C), Overcast, winds S 4 mph
- Referee: Terry Leyden
- TV announcers (Mtn. & CBS-C): James Bates, Todd Christensen, & Sammy Linebaugh

The Cougars dominated the first three quarters, but they were unable to find the endzone consistently. With a 13–0 lead, Las Vegas Bowl representatives were ready to extend an invitation once again to BYU. BYU would cost themselves dearly in the fourth. Two turnovers by BYU led to 2 Ute touchdowns. With Utah driving late in the final quarter, cornerback Brandon Bradley intercepted a Jordan Wynn pass but fumbled on the return, giving the ball back to Utah. Initial replay review appeared to show that Bradley's knee was down before the fumble occurred, but the initial call of a fumble was upheld on review. Following the fumble, Utah would score on a 3-yard run to take the lead at 17–16. The Utes would block a Payne field goal attempt on the final play of the game to conserve the win. It would go down as one of the many great BYU-Utah games solely because of the fourth quarter.

Scoring summary

| Quarter | Time | Drive | | | Team | Scoring information | Score | |
| Quarter | Time | Plays | Yards | TOP | Team | Scoring information | BYU | Utah |
|---|---|---|---|---|---|---|---|---|
| 1 | 4:34 | 10 | 45 | 3:48 | BYU | 43-yard field goal by Mitch Payne | 3 | 0 |
| 2 | 00:02 | 7 | 21 | 2:23 | BYU | 37-yard field goal by Mitch Payne | 6 | 0 |
| 3 | 4:51 | 3 | 19 | 0:58 | BYU | McKay Jacobson 21-yard touchdown reception from Jake Heaps, Mitch Payne kick good | 13 | 0 |
| 4 | 14:56 | 12 | 39 | 4:53 | Utah | 40-yard field goal by Joe Phillips | 13 | 3 |
| 4 | 13:46 | 1 | 37 | 0:14 | Utah | De Christopher 37-yard touchdown reception from Jordan Wynn, Joe Phillips kick good | 13 | 10 |
| 4 | 7:38 | 15 | 56 | 7:38 | BYU | 42-yard field goal by Mitch Payne | 16 | 10 |
| 4 | 4:24 | 3 | 38 | 1:24 | Utah | Matt Asiata 3-yard touchdown run, Joe Phillips kick good | 16 | 17 |
| "TOP" = time of possession. For other American football terms, see Glossary of American football. | | | | | | | 16 | 17 |

=== New Mexico Bowl ===
Old WAC rivals were put together in the New Mexico Bowl as the 6–6 Cougars took on the 6–6 Miners. It was the 37th meeting overall with BYU holding a 28–7–1 advantage in the series.

2010 New Mexico Bowl: BYU vs. UTEP

| Team | 1 | 2 | 3 | 4 | Total |
|---|---|---|---|---|---|
| Miners | 3 | 7 | 7 | 7 | 24 |
| • Cougars | 17 | 14 | 14 | 7 | 52 |

- Date: December 13
- Location: University Stadium
  Albuquerque, NM
- Game start: 12:09 pm MST
- Elapsed time: 3:27
- Game attendance: 32,424
- Game weather: 51 °F (11 °C), Partly Cloudy, winds W 11 mph
- Referee: Stan Evans
- TV announcers (ESPN/ESPN Radio): Bob Wischusen, Brian Griese, & Jenn Brown (ESPN)
  Dave LaMont, JC Pearson, & Shannon Spake (ESPN Radio)

BYU went into the New Mexico Bowl with the sole purpose of building momentum for the 2011 season. UTEP went in hoping they could score and keep up with BYU after their season had changed due to the loss of their star player. The game would turn into a high scoring affair where freshmen would rule the day. Jake Heaps would throw for four touchdown passes and freshman Cody Hoffman would have 137 yards receiving with 3 touchdown receptions. Heaps would win the Offensive Most Outstanding Player award and would cement his role as the starter for BYU in the 2011 season. It would end up being the highlight of Heaps career at BYU. Defensively BYU senior safety Andrew Rich would earn MOP honors.

Scoring summary

| Quarter | Time | Drive | | | Team | Scoring information | Score | |
| Quarter | Time | Plays | Yards | TOP | Team | Scoring information | UTEP | BYU |
|---|---|---|---|---|---|---|---|---|
| 1 | 10:29 | 4 | 37 | 1:28 | BYU | Bryan Kariya 4-yard touchdown run, Mitch Payne kick good | 0 | 7 |
| 1 | 4:37 | 12 | 78 | 5:00 | BYU | Luke Ashworth 9-yard touchdown reception from Jake Heaps, Mitch Payne kick good | 0 | 14 |
| 1 | 2:42 | 4 | -13 | 1:50 | UTEP | 52-yard field goal by Dakota Warren | 3 | 14 |
| 1 | 00:34 | 8 | 28 | 2:10 | BYU | 38-yard field goal by Mitch Payne | 3 | 17 |
| 2 | 14:43 | 1 | 31 | 0:14 | BYU | Cody Hoffman 31-yard touchdown reception from Jake Heaps, Mitch Payne kick good | 3 | 24 |
| 2 | 8:55 | 8 | 64 | 5:30 | BYU | Cody Hoffman 3-yard touchdown reception from Jake Heaps, Mitch Payne kick good | 3 | 31 |
| 2 | 8:38 | 1 | 67 | 0:14 | UTEP | Kris Adams 3-yard touchdown reception from Trevor Vittatoe, Dakota Warren kick good | 10 | 31 |
| 3 | 8:18 | 14 | 75 | 6:43 | BYU | JJ Di Luigi 2-yard touchdown run, Mitch Payne kick good | 10 | 38 |
| 3 | 4:55 | 6 | 66 | 3:24 | UTEP | Kris Adams 37-yard touchdown reception from Trevor Vittatoe, Dakota Warren kick good | 17 | 38 |
| 3 | 00:14 | 5 | 46 | 2:18 | BYU | Cody Hoffman 29-yard touchdown reception from Jake Heaps, Mitch Payne kick good | 17 | 45 |
| 4 | 12:00 | 7 | 65 | 2:47 | BYU | Josh Quezada 8-yard touchdown run, Mitch Payne kick good | 17 | 52 |
| 4 | 9:48 | 4 | 60 | 2:13 | UTEP | Kris Adams 49-yard touchdown reception from Trevor Vittatoe, Dakota Warren kick good | 24 | 52 |
| "TOP" = time of possession. For other American football terms, see Glossary of American football. | | | | | | | 24 | 52 |
