= 2010 San Diego State Aztecs football team =

American college football season

2010 San Diego State Aztecs football
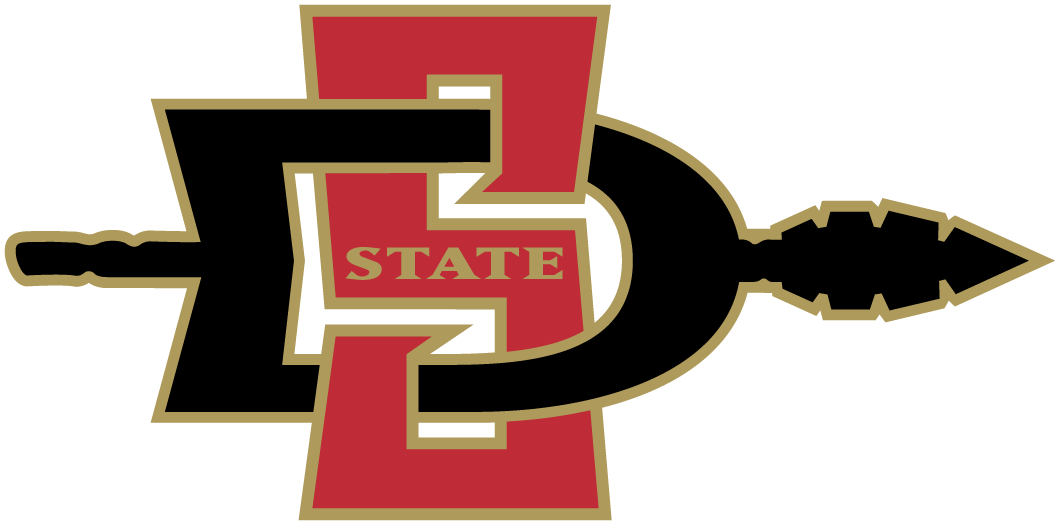

Poinsettia Bowl champion

Poinsettia Bowl, W 35–14 vs. Navy
- Conference: Mountain West Conference
- Record: 9–4 (5–3 MW)
- Head coach: Brady Hoke (2nd season)
- Offensive coordinator: Al Borges (2nd season)
- Offensive scheme: Pro-style
- Defensive coordinator: Rocky Long (2nd season)
- Base defense: 3–3–5
- Home stadium: Qualcomm Stadium

2010 Mountain West Conference football standings
	Conf.			Overall
Team	W		L	W		L
No. 2 TCU $	8	–	0	13	–	0
Utah	7	–	1	10	–	3
Air Force	5	–	3	9	–	4
San Diego State	5	–	3	9	–	4
BYU	5	–	3	7	–	6
Colorado State	2	–	6	3	–	9
UNLV	2	–	6	2	–	11
Wyoming	1	–	7	3	–	9
New Mexico	1	–	7	1	–	11
$ – Conference champion and BCS representative as top non-AQ school to meet automatic qualification criteria; As of January 11, 2011; Rankings from AP Poll

The 2010 San Diego State Aztecs football team represented San Diego State University in the 2010 NCAA Division I FBS football season. The team was coached by second-year head coach Brady Hoke and played their home games in Qualcomm Stadium in San Diego, California. They are members of the Mountain West Conference. They finished the season with a record of 9–4 (5–3 MWC) and a 35–14 victory over Navy in the Poinsettia Bowl.

== Schedule ==
Date	Time	Opponent	Site	TV	Result	Attendance	Source
September 4	5:00 p.m.	Nicholls State*	Qualcomm Stadium; San Diego, CA		W 47–0	25,290	
September 11	5:00 p.m.	at New Mexico State*	Aggie Memorial Stadium; Las Cruces, NM		W 41–21	16,891	
September 18	4:00 p.m.	at Missouri*	Faurot Field; Columbia, MO	FSN PPV	L 24–27	56,050	
September 25	5:00 p.m.	Utah State*	Qualcomm Stadium; San Diego, CA		W 41–7	45,682	
October 9	3:00 p.m.	at BYU	LaVell Edwards Stadium; Provo, UT	mtn	L 21–24	62,176	
October 16	5:00 p.m.	No. 23 Air Force	Qualcomm Stadium; San Diego, CA	CBSCS	W 27–25	28,178	
October 23	7:00 p.m.	at New Mexico	University Stadium; Albuquerque, NM	mtn	W 30–20	16,488	
October 30	11:00 a.m.	at Wyoming	War Memorial Stadium; Laramie, WY	mtn	W 48–38	16,252	
November 6	7:00 p.m.	Colorado State	Qualcomm Stadium; San Diego, CA	mtn	W 24–19	34,689	
November 13	1:00 p.m.	at No. 3 TCU	Amon G. Carter Stadium; Fort Worth, TX	Versus	L 35–40	45,694	
November 20	7:00 p.m.	No. 25 Utah	Qualcomm Stadium; San Diego, CA	mtn	L 34–38	34,951	
November 27	5:00 p.m.	UNLV	Qualcomm Stadium; San Diego, CA	mtn	W 48–14	22,091	
December 23	5:00 p.m.	Navy*	Qualcomm Stadium; San Diego, CA (Poinsettia Bowl)	ESPN	W 35–14	48,049	
*Non-conference game; Rankings from AP Poll released prior to the game; All times are in Pacific time
