= Brandon Burton =

American football player and coach (born 1989)

No. 36, 27, 29
- Position: Cornerback

Personal information
- Born: July 31, 1989 (age 37); West Germany
- Listed height: 6 ft 0 in (1.83 m)
- Listed weight: 185 lb (84 kg)

Career information
- High school: Clear Creek (League City, Texas, U.S.)
- College: Utah (2007-2010)
- NFL draft: 2011: 5th round, 139th overall pick

Career history

Playing
- Minnesota Vikings (2011–2012); Buffalo Bills (2013); Cincinnati Bengals (2014)*; Indianapolis Colts (2014)*
- * Offseason or practice squad member only

Coaching
- Utah (2017-2018) Graduate assistant; Arizona Hotshots (2019) Defensive backs coach; UT Permian Basin (2020-2022) Defensive backs coach

Career NFL statistics
- Total tackles: 14
- Pass deflections: 1
- Stats at Pro Football Reference

Brandon Burton (born July 31, 1989) is an American former professional football player who was a cornerback in the National Football League (NFL). Burton played college football for the Utah Utes and was selected with the 139th pick in the fifth round of the 2011 NFL draft by the Minnesota Vikings. He was also a member of the Buffalo Bills, Cincinnati Bengals and Indianapolis Colts. He was the defensive backs coach for the Arizona Hotshots of the Alliance of American Football (AAF).

== Early life ==
Burton attended Clear Creek High School in League City, Texas. He had 11 career interceptions.

== College career ==
Burton attended the University of Utah, and was redshirted as a freshman in 2007. In 2008 as a redshirt freshman Burton played in 11 games, mainly on special teams, recording three tackles. As a sophomore in 2009, he started 12 of 13 games, recording 43 tackles and an interception.

== Professional career ==
Pre-draft measurables
Height	Weight	Arm length	Hand span	Wingspan	40-yard dash	10-yard split	20-yard split	20-yard shuttle	Three-cone drill	Vertical jump	Broad jump	Bench press
5 ft 11 5/8 in (1.82 m)	190 lb (86 kg)	31 1/2 in (0.80 m)	8 1/2 in (0.22 m)	6 ft 2 1/8 in (1.88 m)	4.48 s	1.57 s	2.58 s	4.07 s	6.93 s	32.0 in (0.81 m)	9 ft 10 in (3.00 m)	18 reps
All values from NFL Combine/Pro Day

=== Minnesota Vikings ===
Burton was selected with the 139th overall pick in the fifth round of the 2011 NFL draft by the Minnesota Vikings.

Burton was released by the Vikings on August 31, 2013 (along with 18 others) to get to a 53-man roster.

=== Buffalo Bills ===
Burton was signed by the Buffalo Bills on September 1, 2013. He was released October 25, 2013. He played in five games with the Bills, recording six total tackles during that span

=== Cincinnati Bengals ===
Burton was signed by the Cincinnati Bengals on December 30, 2013. He was waived on June 11, 2014.

=== Indianapolis Colts ===
Burton was claimed by the Indianapolis Colts on June 12, 2014. He was waived on August 4, 2014.

== Coaching career ==
In 2019, Burton became the defensive backs coach of the Alliance of American Football's Arizona Hotshots.
