= Dave Schramm (American football) =

American football player and coach (born 1963)

Biographical details
- Born: July 20, 1963 (age 63); San Diego, California, U.S.

Playing career
- 1981: Cornell (IA)
- 1982: Grossmont
- 1983: Adams State
- Position: Quarterback

Coaching career (HC unless noted)
- 1984–1987: Patrick Henry HS (CA) (assistant)
- 1988: Austin Peay (RB/TE)
- 1989: Nebraska (GA)
- 1990–1991: San Diego State (RC)
- 1992: San Diego State (OL)
- 1993: San Diego State (S)
- 1994–1996: San Diego State (TE)
- 1997–2001: San Diego State (RB)
- 2002: Texas State (AHC/RB)
- 2003–2004: Montana (OT/TE/RC)
- 2005–2008: Utah (RB/RC)
- 2009: Utah (OC/QB)
- 2010: Utah (co-OC/TE)
- 2011: Utah (RB)
- 2012–2015: Fresno State (OC/QB)
- 2018–2019: Weber State (OC)
- 2020: Utah State (RB)
- 2021–2022: IMG Academy (FL) (OC)
- 2023–2024: Mary (OC)
- 2025: Black Hills State (OC)

Dave Schramm (born July 20, 1963) is an American college football coach and former player. He previously served as the offensive coordinator for the University of Mary, a position he has held from 2023 to 2024. As a student-athlete, Schramm played quarterback for three colleges: Cornell College, Grossmont College, and Adams State College.

== Coaching career ==
Schramm has spent over 25 years as an assistant coach. Schramm got his start in coaching with Patrick Henry High School in San Diego, California, where he was an assistant coach from 1984 to 1987. In 1988, he moved to Austin Peay to coach the running backs and tight ends. In 1989, he spent the season as a graduate assistant with Nebraska. San Diego State then hired him as their recruiting coordinator, a position he held from 1990 to 2000. He also coached various positions with the Aztecs: offensive line (1992), safeties (1993), tight ends (1994–1996), and running backs (1997–2001). For the 2002 season, he was the assistant head coach with Texas State. From 2003 to 2004 he was with Montana as the coach of the tight ends and offensive tackles.

From 2005 to 2008, he was the running backs coach at Utah as well as the recruiting coordinator. On January 17, 2009, Dave Schramm accepted the position as Utah's offensive coordinator and quarterback coach. In 2010 Schramm was switched from coaching the quarterbacks to coaching the tight ends when Brian Johnson was added to the staff. He was also named as co-offensive coordinator along with Aaron Roderick.

Schramm was hired as the offensive coordinator and quarterbacks coach at Fresno State on January 4, 2012. He replaced former offensive coordinator and quarterbacks coach Jeff Grady, who was let go after Pat Hill was fired by the university and Tim DeRuyter was hired as the new head football coach. On November 30, 2015, he was let go after leading the offense to a 3–9 season.
