= 2010 Nevada Wolf Pack football team =

American college football season

2010 Nevada Wolf Pack football

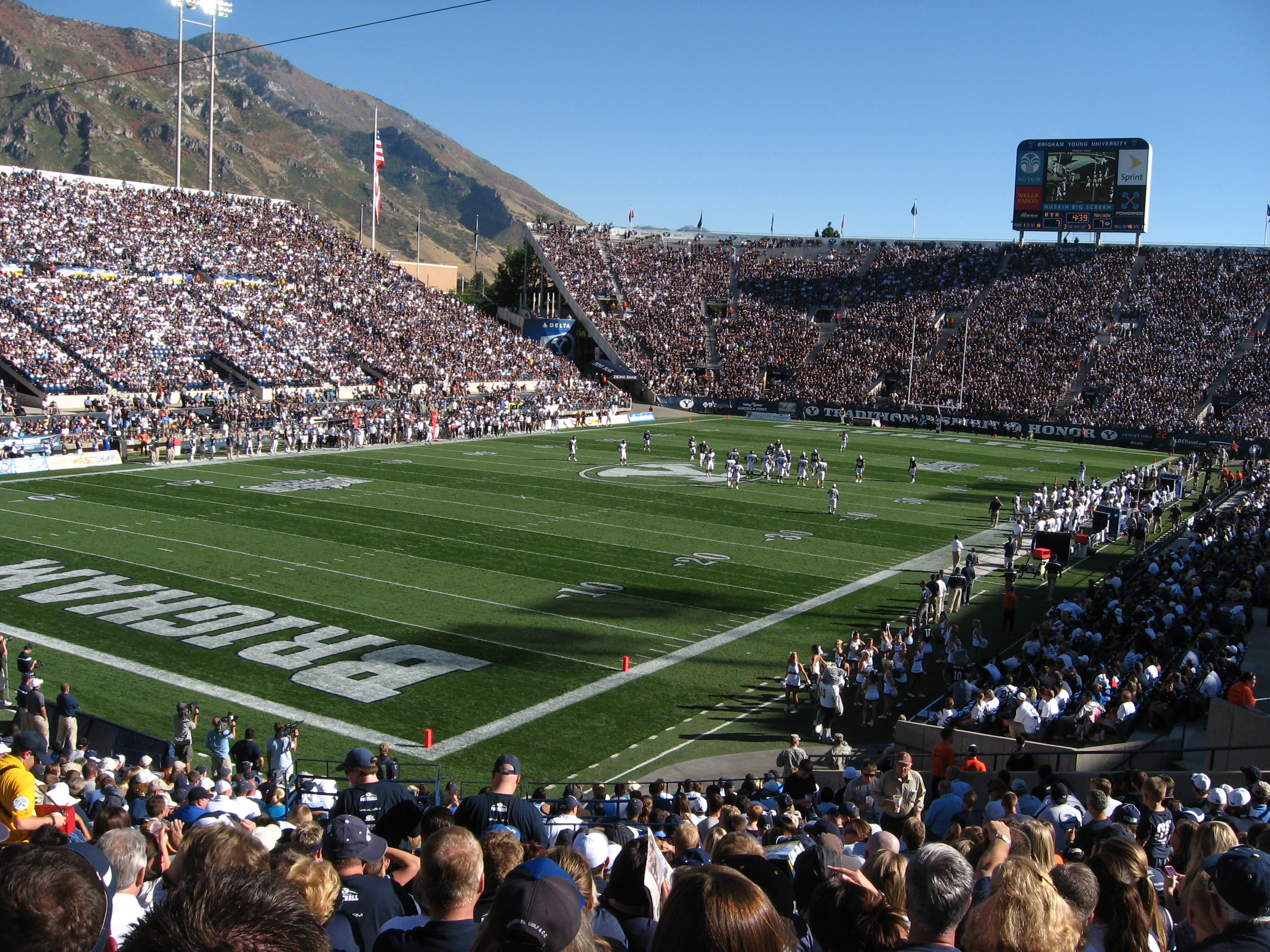
- Nevada on the field vs. BYU on September 25 at LaVell Edwards Stadium

WAC co-champion Kraft Fight Hunger Bowl champion

Kraft Fight Hunger Bowl, W 20–13 vs. Boston College
- Conference: Western Athletic Conference

Ranking
- Coaches: No. 13
- AP: No. 11
- Record: 13–1 (7–1 WAC)
- Head coach: Chris Ault (26th season)
- Offensive scheme: Pistol
- Defensive coordinator: Andy Buh (1st season)
- Base defense: 4–3
- Captain: Colin Kaepernick
- Home stadium: Mackay Stadium

2010 Western Athletic Conference football standings
	Conf.			Overall
Team	W		L	W		L
No. 11 Nevada +	7	–	1	13	–	1
No. 9 Boise State +	7	–	1	12	–	1
Hawaii +	7	–	1	10	–	4
Fresno State	5	–	3	8	–	5
Louisiana Tech	4	–	4	5	–	7
Idaho	3	–	5	6	–	7
Utah State	2	–	6	4	–	8
New Mexico State	1	–	7	2	–	10
San Jose State	0	–	8	1	–	12
+ – Conference co-champions; Rankings from AP Poll

The 2010 Nevada Wolf Pack football team represented the University of Nevada, Reno in the 2010 NCAA Division I FBS football season. The Wolf Pack were led by Chris Ault in his 26th overall and 7th straight season since taking over as head coach for the third time in 2004. They played their home games at Mackay Stadium and were members of the Western Athletic Conference (WAC). They finished the regular season 12–1 and 7–1 in WAC play to share the conference championship with Boise State and Hawaii. They were invited to the Kraft Fight Hunger Bowl where they defeated Boston College 20–13 to finish the season with a 13–1 record.

== Schedule ==
Date	Time	Opponent	Rank	Site	TV	Result	Attendance
September 2	6:00 p.m.	Eastern Washington*		Mackay Stadium; Reno, NV		W 49–24	16,313
September 11	7:30 p.m.	Colorado State*		Mackay Stadium; Reno, NV	ESPNU	W 51–6	18,098
September 17	7:00 p.m.	California*		Mackay Stadium; Reno, NV	ESPN2	W 52–31	28,809
September 25	3:00 p.m.	at BYU*		LaVell Edwards Stadium; Provo, UT	MWSN	W 27–13	61,471
October 2	7:00 p.m.	at UNLV*	No. 25	Sam Boyd Stadium; Whitney, NV (Fremont Cannon)	MWSN	W 44–26	28,958
October 9	1:00 p.m.	San Jose State^{†}	No. 21	Mackay Stadium; Reno, NV	ESPNU	W 35–13	20,636
October 16	8:30 p.m.	at Hawaii	No. 19	Aloha Stadium; Halawa, HI	KAME-TV/WSN/Oceanic PPV	L 21–27	42,031
October 30	7:30 p.m.	Utah State		Mackay Stadium; Reno, NV	ESPNU	W 56–42	11,558
November 6	2:00 p.m.	at Idaho	No. 25	Kibbie Dome; Moscow, ID	KAME-TV/WSN	W 63–17	11,247
November 13	7:30 p.m.	at Fresno State	No. 21	Bulldog Stadium; Fresno, CA	ESPN	W 35–34	37,116
November 20	1:00 p.m.	New Mexico State	No. 19	Mackay Stadium; Reno, NV		W 52–6	10,906
November 26	7:15 p.m.	No. 3 Boise State	No. 19	Mackay Stadium; Reno, NV (rivalry)	ESPN	W 34–31 ^{OT}	30,712
December 4	12:00 p.m.	at Louisiana Tech	No. 14	Joe Aillet Stadium; Ruston, LA	KAME-TV/WSN	W 35–17	18,562
January 9, 2011	6:00 p.m.	vs. Boston College*	No. 13	AT&T Park; San Francisco, CA (Kraft Fight Hunger Bowl)	ESPN	W 20–13	41,063
*Non-conference game; ^{†}Homecoming; Rankings from AP Poll released prior to the game; All times are in Pacific time

== Rankings ==
Ranking movements Legend: ██ Increase in ranking ██ Decrease in ranking — = Not ranked RV = Received votes
	Week															
Poll	Pre	1	2	3	4	5	6	7	8	9	10	11	12	13	14	Final
AP	—	—	RV	RV	25	21	19	RV	RV	25	21	19	19	14	13	11
Coaches	RV	RV	RV	RV	25	23	21	RV	RV	23	21	18	19	17	15	13
Harris	Not released						20	25	24	23	21	18	19	15	14	Not released
BCS	Not released							—	24	23	21	18	19	17	15	Not released

== Game summaries ==
=== Eastern Washington ===
Eastern Washington at Nevada

Team	1	2	3	4	Total
Eagles	7	3	14	0	24
• Wolf Pack	21	7	7	14	49

- Date: September 2, 2010
- Location: Mackay Stadium
  Reno, NV
- Game start: 6:09 p.m. PDT
- Elapsed time: 3 hours and 5 minutes
- Game attendance: 16,313
- Game weather: Temperature: 90 °F (32 °C) • Weather: Clear • Wind: Calm
- Referee: Robert Cameron
- TV announcers (None): None

Scoring summary
1	13:09	NEV	Vai Taua 1–yard run (Anthony Martinez kick) (4 plays, 33 yards, 1:51)	NEV 7–0
1	08:41	NEV	Colin Kaepernick 1–yard run (Anthony Martinez kick) (8 plays, 41 yards, 3:32)	NEV 14–0
1	08:23	EWU	Taiwan Jones 82–yard pass from Bo Levi Mitchell (Mike Jarrett kick) (1 play, 77 yards, 0:12)	NEV 14–7
1	03:27	NEV	Colin Kaepernick 5–yard run (Anthony Martinez kick) (11 plays, 80 yards, 4:56)	NEV 21–7
2	14:08	EWU	Mike Jarrett 40–yard field goal (12 plays, 48 yards, 4:14)	NEV 21–10
2	00:17	NEV	Virgil Green 48–yard pass from Colin Kaepernick (Anthony Martinez kick) (8 plays, 96 yards, 2:10)	NEV 28–10
3	12:26	NEV	Virgil Green 40–yard pass from Colin Kaepernick (Anthony Martinez kick) (4 plays, 59 yards, 1:29)	NEV 35–10
3	11:16	EWU	Brandon Kaufman 5–yard pass from Bo Levi Mitchell (Mike Jarrett kick) (3 plays, 80 yards, 1:10)	NEV 35–17
3	01:21	EWU	Darriell Beaumonte 1–yard run (Mike Jarrett kick) (13 plays, 80 yards, 5:15)	NEV 35–24
4	09:17	NEV	Vai Taua 3–yard run (Anthony Martinez kick) (3 plays, 20 yards, 0:48)	NEV 42–24
4	03:38	NEV	Lampford Mark 1–yard run (Anthony Martinez kick) (7 plays, 51 yards, 3:49)	NEV 49–24

Statistics	Eastern Washington	Nevada
First downs	20	24
Total yards	432	553
Rushing yards	162	214
Passing yards	270	339
Turnovers	2	2
Time of possession	25:49	34:11

Team	Category	Player	Statistics
Eastern Washington	Passing	Bo Levi Mitchell	19/35, 253 yards, 2 TDs
Eastern Washington	Rushing	Taiwan Jones	12 carries, 145 yards
Eastern Washington	Receiving	Taiwan Jones	2 receptions, 92 yards, 1 TD
Nevada	Passing	Colin Kaepernick	26/37, 306 yards, 2 TDs
Nevada	Rushing	Colin Kaepernick	11 carries, 60 yards, 2 TDs
Nevada	Receiving	Virgil Green	7 receptions, 144 yards, 2 TDs

=== Colorado State ===
Colorado State at Nevada

Team	1	2	3	4	Total
Rams	3	0	3	0	6
• Wolf Pack	17	17	7	10	51

- Date: September 11, 2010
- Location: Mackay Stadium
  Reno, NV
- Game start: 7:39 p.m. PDT
- Elapsed time: 2 hours and 49 minutes
- Game attendance: 18,098
- Game weather: Temperature: 80 °F (27 °C) • Weather: Clear • Wind: 5 MPH
- Referee: Robert Cameron
- TV announcers (ESPNU): Todd Harris (play–by–play) and David Diaz-Infante (analyst)

Scoring summary
1	12:31	NEV	Anthony Martinez 31–yard field goal (6 plays, 66 yards, 2:29)	NEV 3–0
1	09:01	NEV	Colin Kaepernick 44–yard run (Anthony Martinez kick) (6 plays, 67 yards, 2:11)	NEV 10–0
1	05:48	NEV	Tray Session 29–yard pass from Colin Kaepernick (Anthony Martinez kick) (5 plays, 85 yards, 2:08)	NEV 17–0
1	03:11	CSU	Ben DeLine 40–yard field goal (8 plays, 45 yards, 2:32)	NEV 17–3
2	12:12	NEV	Virgil Green 15–yard pass from Colin Kaepernick (Anthony Martinez kick) (14 plays, 80 yards, 5:59)	NEV 24–3
2	02:48	NEV	Vai Taua 4–yard run (Anthony Martinez kick) (9 plays, 51 yards, 4:40)	NEV 31–3
2	00:03	NEV	Anthony Martinez 33–yard field goal (8 plays, 46 yards, 0:40)	NEV 34–3
3	06:52	NEV	Colin Kaepernick 8–yard run (Anthony Martinez kick) (8 plays, 69 yards, 2:45)	NEV 41–3
3	00:54	CSU	Ben DeLine 38–yard field goal (12 plays, 48 yards, 5:52)	NEV 41–6
4	10:15	NEV	Anthony Martinez 22–yard field goal (13 plays, 75 yards, 5:39)	NEV 44–6
4	01:40	NEV	Stefphon Jefferson 21–yard run (Anthony Martinez kick) (12 plays, 73 yards, 6:37)	NEV 51–6

Statistics	Colorado State	Nevada
First downs	18	33
Total yards	272	631
Rushing yards	78	376
Passing yards	194	255
Turnovers	2	1
Time of possession	26:46	33:14

Team	Category	Player	Statistics
Colorado State	Passing	Pete Thomas	23/36, 194 yards, 1 INT
Colorado State	Rushing	Leonard Mason	8 carries, 33 yards
Colorado State	Receiving	Tyson Liggett	7 receptions, 46 yards
Nevada	Passing	Colin Kaepernick	21/29, 241 yards, 2 TDs
Nevada	Rushing	Colin Kaepernick	11 carries, 161 yards, 2 TDs
Nevada	Receiving	Rishard Matthews	6 receptions, 87 yards

=== California ===
California at Nevada

Team	1	2	3	4	Total
Golden Bears	7	7	10	7	31
• Wolf Pack	7	17	14	14	52

- Date: September 17, 2010
- Location: Mackay Stadium
  Reno, NV
- Game start: 7:05 p.m. PDT
- Elapsed time: 3 hours and 19 minutes
- Game attendance: 28,809
- Game weather: Temperature: 78 °F (26 °C) • Weather: Overcast • Wind: NW 14–25 MPH
- Referee: Steve Strimling
- TV announcers (ESPN2): Mark Neely (play–by–play) and David Norrie (analyst)

Scoring summary
1	08:23	NEV	Tray Session 15–yard pass from Colin Kaepernick (Anthony Martinez kick) (12 plays, 80 yards, 6:37)	NEV 7–0
1	03:06	CAL	Shane Vereen 59–yard run (Giorgio Tavecchio kick) (1 play, 59 yards, 0:11)	TIE 7–7
2	12:45	NEV	Colin Kaepernick 1–yard run (Anthony Martinez kick) (12 plays, 85 yards, 5:18)	NEV 14–7
2	08:22	NEV	Colin Kaepernick 8–yard run (Anthony Martinez kick) (5 plays, 47 yards, 2:09)	NEV 21–7
2	03:19	CAL	Shane Vereen 1–yard run (Giorgio Tavecchio kick) (4 plays, 21 yards, 2:00)	NEV 21–14
2	00:02	NEV	Anthony Martinez 30–yard field goal (10 plays, 61 yards, 3:10)	NEV 24–14
3	11:59	CAL	Shane Vereen 50–yard run (Giorgio Tavecchio kick) (5 plays, 80 yards, 3:01)	NEV 24–21
3	08:41	NEV	Marlon Johnson 65–yard interception (Anthony Martinez kick)	NEV 31–21
3	05:14	CAL	Giorgio Tavecchio 22–yard field goal (8 plays, 76 yards, 3:22)	NEV 31–24
3	01:14	NEV	Rishard Matthews 0–yard fumble recovery (Anthony Martinez kick)	NEV 38–24
4	07:43	NEV	Vai Taua 54–yard run (Anthony Martinez kick) (5 plays, 87 yards, 2:10)	NEV 45–24
4	06:20	CAL	Eric Stevens 4–yard pass from Kevin Riley (Giorgio Tavecchio kick) (6 plays, 71 yards, 1:16)	NEV 45–31
4	03:29	NEV	Colin Kaepernick 27–yard run (Anthony Martinez kick) (5 plays, 41 yards, 2:50)	NEV 52–31

Statistics	California	Nevada
First downs	22	26
Total yards	502	497
Rushing yards	225	316
Passing yards	277	181
Turnovers	1	4
Time of possession	29:22	30:38

Team	Category	Player	Statistics
California	Passing	Kevin Riley	23/37, 277 yards, 1 TD, 3 INTs
California	Rushing	Shane Vereen	19 carries, 198 yards, 3 TDs
California	Receiving	Marvin Jones	12 receptions, 161 yards
Nevada	Passing	Colin Kaepernick	10/15, 181 yards, 2 TDs
Nevada	Rushing	Vai Taua	25 carries, 151 yards, 1 TD
Nevada	Receiving	Rishard Matthews	3 receptions, 83 yards, 1 TD

=== At BYU ===
Nevada at BYU

Team	1	2	3	4	Total
• Wolf Pack	14	10	0	3	27
Cougars	7	3	0	3	13

- Date: September 25, 2010
- Location: LaVell Edwards Stadium
  Provo, UT
- Game start: 4:06 p.m. MDT
- Elapsed time: 3 hours and 9 minutes
- Game attendance: 61,471
- Game weather: Temperature: 74 °F (23 °C) • Weather: Sunny • Wind: WSW 7 MPH
- Referee: Marvel July
- TV announcers (MWSN): Ari Wolfe (play–by–play), Blaine Fowler (analyst) and Sammy Linebaugh (sideline)

Scoring summary
1	10:16	NEV	Courtney Randall 6–yard pass from Colin Kaepernick (Anthony Martinez kick) (9 plays, 84 yards, 4:44)	NEV 7–0
1	07:04	BYU	J. J. Di Luigi 2–yard run (Mitch Payne kick) (5 plays, 36 yards, 1:31)	TIE 7–7
1	01:39	NEV	Vai Taua 1–yard run (Anthony Martinez kick) (12 plays, 80 yards, 5:25)	NEV 14–7
2	09:18	NEV	Colin Kaepernick 4–yard run (Anthony Martinez kick) (9 plays, 57 yards, 4:48)	NEV 21–7
2	01:20	BYU	Mitch Payne 27–yard field goal (11 plays, 35 yards, 2:58)	NEV 21–10
2	00:00	NEV	Ricky Drake 38–yard field goal (9 plays, 55 yards, 1:14)	NEV 24–10
4	11:27	NEV	Anthony Martinez 29–yard field goal (21 plays, 75 yards, 8:53)	NEV 27–10
4	07:46	BYU	Mitch Payne 29–yard field goal (9 plays, 65 yards, 3:36)	NEV 27–13

Statistics	Nevada	BYU
First downs	23	21
Total yards	435	320
Rushing yards	239	91
Passing yards	196	229
Turnovers	4	0
Time of possession	36:17	23:43

Team	Category	Player	Statistics
Nevada	Passing	Colin Kaepernick	16/25, 196 yards, 1 TD, 1 INT
Nevada	Rushing	Vai Taua	29 carries, 133 yards, 1 TD
Nevada	Receiving	Brandon Wimberly	2 receptions, 59 yards
BYU	Passing	Jake Heaps	24/45, 229 yards
BYU	Rushing	J. J. Luigi	15 carries, 67 yards, 1 TD
BYU	Receiving	Cody Hoffman	4 receptions, 74 yards

=== At UNLV ===
Nevada at UNLV
(Battle for the Fremont Cannon)

Team	1	2	3	4	Total
• No. 25 Wolf Pack	7	21	10	6	44
Rebels	7	7	3	9	26

- Date: October 2, 2010
- Location: Sam Boyd Stadium
  Whitney, NV
- Game start: 7:06 p.m. PDT
- Elapsed time: 3 hours
- Game attendance: 28,958
- Game weather: Temperature: 86 °F (30 °C) • Weather: Cloudy • Wind: ESE 8 MPH
- Referee: Bill Athan
- TV announcers (MWSN): Ari Wolfe (play–by–play), Blaine Fowler (analyst) and Molly Sullivan (sideline)

Scoring summary
1	10:18	NEV	Colin Kaepernick 16–yard run (Anthony Martinez kick) (8 plays, 60 yards, 3:45)	NEV 7–0
1	05:23	UNLV	Bradley Randle 1–yard run (Nolan Kohorst kick) (4 plays, 17 yards, 1:51)	TIE 7–7
2	13:24	NEV	Courtney Randall 1–yard run (Anthony Martinez kick) (14 plays, 76 yards, 6:53)	NEV 14–7
2	07:47	UNLV	Omar Clayton 8–yard run (Nolan Kohorst kick) (10 plays, 88 yards, 5:32)	TIE 14–14
2	02:40	NEV	Vai Taua 3–yard run (Anthony Martinez kick) (5 plays, 54 yards, 2:02)	NEV 21–14
2	00:57	NEV	Vai Taua 22–yard pass from Colin Kaepernick (Anthony Martinez kick) (3 plays, 43 yards, 0:53)	NEV 28–14
3	02:42	NEV	Anthony Martinez 29–yard field goal (10 plays, 37 yards, 4:40)	NEV 31–14
3	00:31	UNLV	Nolan Kohorst 24–yard field goal (5 plays, 68 yards, 2:06)	NEV 31–17
3	00:15	NEV	Vai Taua 72–yard run (Anthony Martinez kick) (1 play, 72 yards, 0:11)	NEV 38–17
4	11:57	UNLV	Nolan Kohorst 32–yard field goal (9 plays, 45 yards, 3:18)	NEV 38–20
4	08:59	NEV	Vai Taua 2–yard run (Anthony Martinez kick failed) (7 plays, 60 yards, 2:58)	NEV 44–20
4	04:35	UNLV	Anthony Vidal 4–yard pass from Omar Clayton (Michael Johnson rush fumbled) (9 plays, 38 yards, 4:13)	NEV 44–26

Statistics	Nevada	UNLV
First downs	29	15
Total yards	516	294
Rushing yards	374	80
Passing yards	142	214
Turnovers	5	3
Time of possession	32:35	27:25

Team	Category	Player	Statistics
Nevada	Passing	Colin Kaepernick	13/17, 124 yards, 1 TD, 1 INT
Nevada	Rushing	Vai Taua	19 carries, 188 yards, 3 TDs
Nevada	Receiving	Brandon Wimberly	5 receptions, 35 yards
UNLV	Passing	Omar Clayton	14/23, 214 yards, 1 TD, 1 INT
UNLV	Rushing	Omar Clayton	11 carries, 48 yards, 1 TD
UNLV	Receiving	Phillip Payne	8 receptions, 170 yards

=== San Jose State ===
San Jose State at Nevada

Team	1	2	3	4	Total
Spartans	10	3	0	0	13
• No. 21 Wolf Pack	14	7	7	7	35

- Date: October 9, 2010
- Location: Mackay Stadium
  Reno, NV
- Game start: 7:35 p.m. PDT
- Elapsed time: 3 hours and 16 minutes
- Game attendance: 20,636
- Game weather: Temperature: 67 °F (19 °C) • Weather: Clear • Wind: Varies
- Referee: Robert Cameron
- TV announcers (ESPNU): Todd Harris (play–by–play) and David Diaz-Infante (analyst)

Scoring summary
1	13:05	NEV	Colin Kaepernick 13–yard run (Anthony Martinez kick) (5 plays, 70 yards, 1:55)	NEV 7–0
1	08:35	SJSU	Brandon Rutley 13–yard run (Harrison Waid kick) (10 plays, 80 yards, 4:30)	TIE 7–7
1	03:00	NEV	Colin Kaepernick 20–yard run (Anthony Martinez kick) (4 plays, 68 yards, 1:24)	NEV 14–7
1	00:11	SJSU	Harrison Waid 28–yard field goal (7 plays, 49 yards, 2:49)	NEV 14–10
2	12:43	NEV	Vai Taua 1–yard run (Anthony Martinez kick) (6 plays, 58 yards, 2:05)	NEV 21–10
2	00:12	SJSU	Harrison Waid 42–yard field goal (9 plays, 54 yards, 2:06)	NEV 21–13
3	09:36	NEV	Vai Taua 73–yard run (Anthony Martinez kick) (5 plays, 88 yards, 1:41)	NEV 28–13
4	10:23	NEV	Vai Taua 4–yard run (Anthony Martinez kick) (14 plays, 66 yards, 6:21)	NEV 35–13

Statistics	San Jose State	Nevada
First downs	21	30
Total yards	372	640
Rushing yards	178	367
Passing yards	194	273
Turnovers	3	1
Time of possession	31:55	28:05

Team	Category	Player	Statistics
San Jose State	Passing	Jordan LaSecla	14/33, 145 yards, 2 INTs
San Jose State	Rushing	Lamon Muldrow	21 carries, 77 yards
San Jose State	Receiving	Jalal Beauchman	4 receptions, 55 yards
Nevada	Passing	Colin Kaepernick	20/27, 273 yards, 1 INT
Nevada	Rushing	Vai Taua	16 carries, 196 yards, 3 TDs
Nevada	Receiving	Brandon Wimberly	3 receptions, 55 yards

=== At Hawaii ===
Nevada at Hawaii

Team	1	2	3	4	Total
No. 19 Wolf Pack	0	0	7	14	21
• Warriors	14	3	0	10	27

- Date: October 16, 2010
- Location: Aloha Stadium
  Halawa, HI
- Game start: 5:37 p.m.
- Elapsed time: 3 hours and 13 minutes
- Game attendance: 42,031
- Game weather: Temperature: 83 °F (28 °C) • Weather: Partly Cloudy • Wind: NE 14 MPH
- Referee: Jim Farmer
- TV announcers (KAME-TV/WSN/Oceanic PPV): Guy Haberman (play–by–play), Dick Tomey (analyst) and Lauren Mickler (sideline) of KAME-TV/WSN and Jim Leahey (play–by–play), Shawn Ching (analyst) and Russell Yamanoha (sideline) of Oceanic PPV

Scoring summary
1	09:55	UH	Kealoha Pilares 6–yard pass from Bryant Moniz (Scott Enos kick) (2 plays, 19 yards, 0:57)	UH 7–0
1	04:59	UH	Kealoha Pilares 16–yard pass from Bryant Moniz (Scott Enos kick) (8 plays, 76 yards, 4:06)	UH 14–0
2	07:42	UH	Scott Enos 24–yard field goal (9 plays, 58 yards, 3:59)	UH 17–0
3	01:18	NEV	Colin Kaepernick 1–yard run (Anthony Martinez kick) (7 plays, 17 yards, 3:17)	UH 17–7
4	11:10	UH	Scott Enos 31–yard field goal (10 plays, 55 yards, 5:04)	UH 20–7
4	09:30	NEV	Vai Taua 18–yard pass from Colin Kaepernick (Anthony Martinez kick) (3 plays, 14 yards, 1:27)	UH 20–14
4	05:27	UH	Royce Pollard 11–yard pass from Bryant Moniz (Scott Enos kick) (6 plays, 57 yards, 3:56)	UH 27–14
4	03:06	NEV	Mike Ball 10–yard pass from Colin Kaepernick (Anthony Martinez kick) (8 plays, 68 yards, 2:19)	UH 27–21

Statistics	Nevada	Hawaii
First downs	17	18
Total yards	293	346
Rushing yards	134	59
Passing yards	159	287
Turnovers	6	3
Time of possession	31:24	28:36

Team	Category	Player	Statistics
Nevada	Passing	Colin Kaepernick	14/26, 159 yards, 2 TDs, 2 INTs
Nevada	Rushing	Vai Taua	24 carries, 91 yards
Nevada	Receiving	Brandon Wimberly	4 receptions, 62 yards
Hawaii	Passing	Bryant Moniz	26/36, 287 yards, 3 TDs
Hawaii	Rushing	Alex Green	13 carries, 68 yards
Hawaii	Receiving	Greg Salas	11 receptions, 153 yards

=== Utah State ===
Utah State at Nevada

Team	1	2	3	4	Total
Aggies	0	0	21	21	42
• Wolf Pack	14	21	14	7	56

- Date: October 30, 2010
- Location: Mackay Stadium
  Reno, NV
- Game start: 7:35 p.m. PDT
- Elapsed time: 3 hours and 23 minutes
- Game attendance: 11,558
- Game weather: Temperature: 50 °F (10 °C) • Weather: Cloudy • Wind: W 9 MPH
- Referee: Jim Farmer
- TV announcers (ESPNU): Todd Harris (play–by–play) and David Diaz-Infante (analyst)

Scoring summary
1	09:11	NEV	Mike Ball 8–yard pass from Colin Kaepernick (Anthony Martinez kick) (12 plays, 77 yards, 5:49)	NEV 7–0
1	03:45	NEV	Tyler Lantrip 13–yard run (Anthony Martinez kick) (9 plays, 70 yards, 3:44)	NEV 14–0
2	10:00	NEV	Lampford Mark 5–yard run (Anthony Martinez kick) (9 plays, 49 yards, 4:28)	NEV 21–0
2	02:18	NEV	Colin Kaepernick 59–yard run (Anthony Martinez kick) (2 plays, 66 yards, 0:40)	NEV 28–0
2	01:35	NEV	Mike Ball 5–yard run (Anthony Martinez kick) (2 plays, 60 yards, 0:12)	NEV 35–0
3	10:00	USU	Tarren Lloyd 15–yard run from Diondre Borel (Peter Caldwell kick) (11 plays, 84 yards, 4:53)	NEV 35–7
3	08:00	NEV	Mike Ball 35–yard run (Anthony Martinez kick) (4 plays, 60 yards, 2:00)	NEV 42–7
3	05:30	USU	Diondre Borel 1–yard run (Peter Caldwell kick) (7 plays, 80 yards, 2:30)	NEV 42–14
3	02:02	NEV	Nick Hale 20–yard pass from Colin Kaepernick (Anthony Martinez kick) (6 plays, 90 yards, 3:18)	NEV 49–14
3	00:06	USU	Robert Marshall 3–yard run (Peter Caldwell kick) (6 plays, 80 yards, 1:56)	NEV 49–21
4	11:01	USU	Dontel Watkins 15–yard pass from Diondre Borel (Peter Caldwell kick) (8 plays, 70 yards, 1:26)	NEV 49–28
4	02:23	USU	Kerwynn Williams 7–yard run (Peter Caldwell kick) (15 plays, 87 yards, 4:41)	NEV 49–35
4	01:07	NEV	Courtney Randall 1–yard run (Anthony Martinez kick) (6 plays, 44 yards, 1:16)	NEV 56–35
4	00:55	USU	Kerwynn Williams 92–yard kickoff return (Peter Caldwell kick)	NEV 56–42

Statistics	Utah State	Nevada
First downs	27	30
Total yards	490	596
Rushing yards	91	387
Passing yards	399	209
Turnovers	3	1
Time of possession	27:32	32:28

Team	Category	Player	Statistics
Utah State	Passing	Diondre Borel	24/38, 399 yards, 2 TDs
Utah State	Rushing	Derrvin Speight	17 carries, 51 yards
Utah State	Receiving	Kellen Bartlett	5 receptions, 121 yards
Nevada	Passing	Colin Kaepernick	10/15, 190 yards, 2 TDs
Nevada	Rushing	Colin Kaepernick	8 carries, 102 yards, 1 TD
Nevada	Receiving	Rishard Matthews	2 receptions, 63 yards

=== At Idaho ===
Nevada at Idaho

Team	1	2	3	4	Total
• No. 25 Wolf Pack	14	14	14	21	63
Vandals	0	3	14	0	17

- Date: November 6, 2010
- Location: Kibbie Dome
  Moscow, ID
- Game start: 2:07 p.m. PDT
- Elapsed time: 3 hours and 16 minutes
- Game attendance: 11,247
- Game weather: Temperature: N/A • Weather: N/A • Wind: N/A
- Referee: Bill Athan
- TV announcers (KAME-TV/WSN): Guy Haberman (play–by–play) and Dick Tomey (analyst)

Scoring summary
1	10:31	NEV	Shane Anderson 28–yard pass from Colin Kaepernick (Anthony Martinez kick) (12 plays, 80 yards, 4:51)	NEV 7–0
1	03:47	NEV	Rishard Matthews 53–yard pass from Colin Kaepernick (Anthony Martinez kick) (4 plays, 76 yards, 1:45)	NEV 14–0
2	14:12	NEV	Malcolm Shepherd 6–yard pass from Colin Kaepernick (Anthony Martinez kick) (8 plays, 57 yards, 3:21)	NEV 21–0
2	05:31	IDAHO	Trey Farquhar 31–yard field goal (14 plays, 71 yards, 4:39)	NEV 21–3
2	00:00	NEV	Rishard Matthews 2–yard pass from Colin Kaepernick (Anthony Martinez kick) (7 plays, 96 yards, 0:46)	NEV 28–3
3	11:35	NEV	Virgil Green 7–yard pass from Colin Kaepernick (Anthony Martinez kick) (4 plays, 69 yards, 1:42)	NEV 35–3
3	06:24	IDAHO	Nathan Enderle 12–yard run (Trey Farquhar kick) (12 plays, 75 yards, 5:04)	NEV 35–10
3	03:38	NEV	Rishard Matthews 7–yard run (Anthony Martinez kick) (7 plays, 80 yards, 2:46)	NEV 42–10
3	02:47	IDAHO	Justin Veltung 75–yard pass from Nathan Enderle (Trey Farquhar kick) (3 plays, 80 yards, 0:45)	NEV 42–17
4	13:21	NEV	Mike Ball 7–yard run (Anthony Martinez kick) (5 plays, 63 yards, 2:02)	NEV 49–17
4	08:16	NEV	Mike Ball 6–yard run (Anthony Martinez kick) (12 plays, 91 yards, 4:52)	NEV 56–17
4	03:28	NEV	Tray Session 57–yard pass from Tyler Lantrip (Anthony Martinez kick) (4 plays, 79 yards, 2:23)	NEV 63–17

Statistics	Nevada	Idaho
First downs	38	14
Total yards	844	339
Rushing yards	453	68
Passing yards	391	271
Turnovers	1	8
Time of possession	38:42	21:18

Team	Category	Player	Statistics
Nevada	Passing	Colin Kaepernick	20/30, 320 yards, 5 TDs
Nevada	Rushing	Lampford Mark	6 carries, 116 yards
Nevada	Receiving	Rishard Matthews	7 receptions, 151 yards, 2 TDs
Idaho	Passing	Nathan Enderle	15/34, 224 yards, 1 TD
Idaho	Rushing	Deonte Jackson	7 carries, 34 yards
Idaho	Receiving	Justin Veltung	1 reception, 75 yards, 1 TD

=== At Fresno State ===
Nevada at Fresno State

Team	1	2	3	4	Total
• No. 21 Wolf Pack	7	14	7	7	35
Bulldogs	14	3	14	3	34

- Date: November 13, 2010
- Location: Bulldog Stadium
  Fresno, CA
- Game start: 7:30 p.m. PST
- Elapsed time: 3 hours and 15 minutes
- Game attendance: 37,116
- Game weather: Temperature: 52 °F (11 °C) • Weather: Clear and Crisp • Wind: W 1 MPH
- Referee: Steve Strimling
- TV announcers (ESPN): Todd Harris (play–by–play) and David Diaz-Infante (analyst)

Scoring summary
1	12:37	FS	Robbie Rouse 2–yard run (Kevin Goessling kick) (6 plays, 73 yards, 2:23)	FS 7–0
1	10:37	NEV	Colin Kaepernick 47–yard run (Anthony Martinez kick) (4 plays, 69 yards, 1:54)	TIE 7–7
1	07:42	FS	Robbie Rouse 12–yard pass from Ryan Colburn (Kevin Goessling kick) (8 plays, 72 yards, 2:47)	FS 14–7
2	04:18	FS	Kevin Goessling 42–yard field goal (7 plays, 61 yards, 3:52)	FS 17–7
2	01:01	NEV	Vai Taua 4–yard run (Anthony Martinez kick) (10 plays, 73 yards, 3:09)	FS 17–14
2	00:34	NEV	Vai Taua 1–yard run (Anthony Martinez kick) (2 plays, 20 yards, 0:10)	NEV 21–17
3	11:52	FS	Isaiah Burse 26–yard pass from Ryan Colburn (Kevin Goessling kick) (4 plays, 51 yards, 1:13)	FS 24–21
3	09:28	NEV	Colin Kaepernick 19–yard run (Anthony Martinez kick) (6 plays, 60 yards, 2:24)	NEV 28–24
3	06:27	FS	Robbie Rouse 44–yard run (Kevin Goessling kick) (7 plays, 73 yards, 2:54)	FS 31–28
4	14:55	FS	Kevin Goessling 34–yard field goal (11 plays, 63 yards, 5:04)	FS 34–28
4	04:51	NEV	Vai Taua 24–yard run (Anthony Martinez kick) (7 plays, 54 yards, 3:03)	NEV 35–34

Statistics	Nevada	Fresno State
First downs	18	23
Total yards	416	444
Rushing yards	245	250
Passing yards	171	194
Turnovers	0	4
Time of possession	28:38	31:22

Team	Category	Player	Statistics
Nevada	Passing	Colin Kaepernick	16/26, 171 yards, 1 INT
Nevada	Rushing	Colin Kaepernick	14 carries, 156 yards, 2 TDs
Nevada	Receiving	Malcolm Shepherd	7 receptions, 68 yards
Fresno State	Passing	Ryan Colburn	16/26, 194 yards, 2 TDs
Fresno State	Rushing	Robbie Rouse	26 carries, 217 yards, 2 TDs
Fresno State	Receiving	Rashad Evans	4 receptions, 52 yards

=== New Mexico State ===
New Mexico State at Nevada

Team	1	2	3	4	Total
Aggies	0	3	3	0	6
• No. 19 Wolf Pack	10	21	7	14	52

- Date: November 20, 2010
- Location: Mackay Stadium
  Reno, NV
- Game start: 1:05 p.m. PST
- Elapsed time: 2 hours and 55 minutes
- Game attendance: 10,906
- Game weather: Temperature: 40 °F (4 °C) • Weather: Partly Cloudy • Wind: S 14 MPH
- Referee: Clair Gausman
- TV announcers (None): None

Scoring summary
1	09:17	NEV	Vai Taua 2–yard run (Anthony Martinez kick) (14 plays, 75 yards, 5:43)	NEV 7–0
1	06:38	NEV	Anthony Martinez 36–yard field goal (7 plays, 53 yards, 1:28)	NEV 10–0
2	12:47	NEV	Virgil Green 22–yard pass from Colin Kaepernick (Anthony Martinez kick) (4 plays, 70 yards, 1:25)	NEV 17–0
2	03:40	NEV	Colin Kaepernick 9–yard run (Anthony Martinez kick) (7 plays, 52 yards, 2:49)	NEV 24–0
2	00:52	NMSU	Tyler Stampler 47–yard field goal (8 plays, 30 yards, 2:48)	NEV 24–3
2	00:22	NEV	Vai Taua 79–yard pass from Colin Kaepernick (Anthony Martinez kick) (2 plays, 90 yards, 0:20)	NEV 31–3
3	09:08	NMSU	Tyler Stampler 39–yard field goal (6 plays, 32 yards, 2:26)	NEV 31–6
3	04:44	NEV	Vai Taua 7–yard run (Anthony Martinez kick) (11 plays, 52 yards, 4:17)	NEV 38–6
4	10:03	NEV	Lampford Mark 57–yard run (Anthony Martinez kick) (4 plays, 80 yards, 1:29)	NEV 45–6
4	05:17	NEV	Khalid Wooten 90–yard interception (Anthony Martinez kick)	NEV 52–6

Statistics	New Mexico State	Nevada
First downs	18	26
Total yards	309	494
Rushing yards	89	243
Passing yards	220	251
Turnovers	2	3
Time of possession	34:53	24:01

Team	Category	Player	Statistics
New Mexico State	Passing	Andrew Manley	19/39, 220 yards, 2 INTs
New Mexico State	Rushing	Robert Clay	13 carries, 55 yards
New Mexico State	Receiving	Taveon Rogers	4 receptions, 94 yards
Nevada	Passing	Colin Kaepernick	15/27, 251 yards, 2 TDs
Nevada	Rushing	Vai Taua	22 carries, 111 yards, 2 TDs
Nevada	Receiving	Vai Taua	1 reception, 79 yards, 1 TD

=== Boise State ===
Boise State at Nevada
(rivalry)

Team	1	2	3	4	OT	Total
No. 3 Broncos	3	21	0	7	0	31
• No. 19 Wolf Pack	0	7	7	17	3	34

- Date: November 26, 2010
- Location: Mackay Stadium
  Reno, NV
- Game start: 7:26 p.m. PST
- Elapsed time: 3 hours and 26 minutes
- Game attendance: 30,712
- Game weather: Temperature: 30 °F (−1 °C) • Weather: Cold • Wind: Calm
- Referee: Robert Cameron
- TV announcers (ESPN): Joe Tessitore (play–by–play) and Rod Gilmore (analyst)

Scoring summary
1	06:28	BSU	Kyle Brotzman 33–yard field goal (11 plays, 67 yards, 5:07)	BSU 3–0
2	12:38	BSU	Doug Martin 4–yard run (Kyle Brotzman kick) (13 plays, 87 yards, 6:39)	BSU 10–0
2	05:47	BSU	Titus Young 26–yard pass from Kellen Moore (Kyle Brotzman kick) (6 plays, 48 yards, 2:21)	BSU 17–0
2	04:20	NEV	Vai Taua 5–yard run (Anthony Martinez kick) (4 plays, 70 yards, 1:21)	BSU 17–7
2	02:59	BSU	Doug Martin 51–yard run (Kyle Brotzman kick) (3 plays, 85 yards, 1:15)	BSU 24–7
3	01:23	NEV	Colin Kaepernick 18–yard run (Anthony Martinez kick) (9 plays, 58 yards, 3:40)	BSU 24–14
4	13:01	NEV	Rishard Matthews 44–yard run (Anthony Martinez kick) (5 plays, 68 yards, 2:25)	BSU 24–21
4	05:14	NEV	Anthony Martinez 23–yard field goal (15 plays, 87 yards, 6:07)	TIE 24–24
4	04:53	BSU	Doug Martin 79–yard pass from Kellen Moore (Kyle Brotzman kick) (1 play, 79 yards, 0:15)	BSU 31–24
4	00:13	NEV	Rishard Matthews 7–yard pass from Colin Kaepernick (Anthony Martinez kick) (14 plays, 79 yards, 4:34)	TIE 31–31
OT	15:00	NEV	Anthony Martinez 34–yard field goal (4 plays, 8 yards, 0:00)	NEV 34-31

Statistics	Boise State	Nevada
First downs	21	28
Total yards	493	528
Rushing yards	145	269
Passing yards	348	259
Turnovers	2	3
Time of possession	24:39	35:21

Team	Category	Player	Statistics
Boise State	Passing	Kellen Moore	20/31, 348 yards, 2 TDs
Boise State	Rushing	Doug Martin	24 carries, 152 yards, 2 TDs
Boise State	Receiving	Titus Young	6 receptions, 129 yards, 1 TD
Nevada	Passing	Colin Kaepernick	19/35, 259 yards, 1 TD, 1 INT
Nevada	Rushing	Vai Taua	32 carries, 131 yards, 1 TD
Nevada	Receiving	Rishard Matthews	10 receptions, 172 yards, 1 TD

=== At Louisiana Tech ===
Nevada at Louisiana Tech

Team	1	2	3	4	Total
• No. 14 Wolf Pack	0	14	7	14	35
Bulldogs	7	7	3	0	17

- Date: December 4, 2010
- Location: Joe Aillet Stadium
  Ruston, LA
- Game start: 2:07 p.m. CST
- Elapsed time: 2 hours and 53 minutes
- Game attendance: 18,562
- Game weather: Temperature: 70 °F (21 °C) • Weather: Overcast • Wind: S 5–10 MPH
- Referee: Bill Athan
- TV announcers (KAME-TV/WSN): Guy Haberman (play–by–play) and Ralph Gaston (analyst)

Scoring summary
1	11:16	LATECH	Eric Harper 20–yard pass from Ross Jenkins (Matt Nelson kick) (9 plays, 79 yards, 3:44)	LATECH 7–0
2	13:00	NEV	Vai Taua 1–yard run (Anthony Martinez kick) (12 plays, 75 yards, 4:54)	TIE 7–7
2	09:01	LATECH	Ross Jenkins 1–yard run (Matt Nelson kick) (12 plays, 74 yards, 3:59)	LATECH 14–7
3	02:10	NEV	Colin Kaepernick 5–yard run (Anthony Martinez kick) (14 plays, 83 yards, 6:51)	TIE 14–14
3	09:32	NEV	Colin Kaepernick 1–yard run (Anthony Martinez kick) (12 plays, 83 yards, 5:28)	NEV 21–14
3	03:51	LATECH	Matt Nelson 25–yard field goal (16 plays, 77 yards, 5:41)	NEV 21–17
4	13:53	NEV	Colin Kaepernick 28–yard run (Anthony Martinez kick) (11 plays, 73 yards, 4:58)	NEV 28–17
4	10:15	NEV	Vai Taua 6–yard run (Anthony Martinez kick) (6 plays, 80 yards, 2:37)	NEV 35–17

Statistics	Nevada	Louisiana Tech
First downs	31	17
Total yards	519	292
Rushing yards	360	104
Passing yards	159	188
Turnovers	1	1
Time of possession	38:46	21:14

Team	Category	Player	Statistics
Nevada	Passing	Colin Kaepernick	13/17, 159 yards
Nevada	Rushing	Vai Taua	29 carries, 162 yards, 2 TDs
Nevada	Receiving	Malcolm Shepherd	4 receptions, 51 yards
Louisiana Tech	Passing	Ross Jenkins	14/23, 188 yards, 1 TD
Louisiana Tech	Rushing	Lennon Creer	18 carries, 49 yards
Louisiana Tech	Receiving	Taulib Ikharo	4 receptions, 85 yards

=== Vs. Boston College (Kraft Fight Hunger Bowl) ===
Nevada vs. Boston College
(Kraft Fight Hunger Bowl)

Team	1	2	3	4	Total
• No. 13 Wolf Pack	14	3	3	0	20
Eagles	7	0	3	3	13

- Date: January 9, 2011
- Location: AT&T Park
  San Francisco, CA
- Game start: 6:06 p.m. PST
- Elapsed time: 3 hours and 26 minutes
- Game attendance: 41,063
- Game weather: Temperature: 50 °F (10 °C) • Weather: Clear • Wind: NW 4 MPH
- Referee: Mike Defee
- TV announcers (ESPN): Mark Jones (play–by–play), Bob Davie (analyst), Rod Gilmore (sideline) and Quint Kessenich (sideline)

Scoring summary
1	08:30	BC	Andre Williams 30–yard run (Nate Freese kick) (1 play, 30 yards, 0:08)	BC 7–0
1	03:40	NEV	Rishard Matthews 27–yard pass from Colin Kaepernick (Anthony Martinez kick) (10 plays, 77 yards, 4:41)	TIE 7–7
1	02:27	NEV	Rishard Matthews 72–yard punt return (Anthony Martinez kick)	NEV 14–7
2	05:48	NEV	Anthony Martinez 32–yard field goal (10 plays, 65 yards, 5:27)	NEV 17–7
3	11:08	BC	Nate Freese 22–yard field goal (4 plays, 1 yard, 1:26)	NEV 17–10
3	01:17	NEV	Anthony Martinez 27–yard field goal (9 plays, 46 yards, 2:33)	NEV 20–10
4	03:52	BC	Nate Freese 32–yard field goal (9 plays, 52 yards, 1:39)	NEV 20–13

Statistics	Nevada	Boston College
First downs	16	12
Total yards	306	185
Rushing yards	114	64
Passing yards	192	121
Turnovers	4	1
Time of possession	34:46	25:14

Team	Category	Player	Statistics
Nevada	Passing	Colin Kaepernick	20/33, 192 yards, 1 TD, 1 INT
Nevada	Rushing	Vai Taua	22 carries, 76 yards
Nevada	Receiving	Rishard Matthews	7 receptions, 86 yards, 1 TD
Boston College	Passing	Chase Rettig	14/34, 121 yards, 2 INTs
Boston College	Rushing	Andre Williams	19 carries, 70 yards, 1 TD
Boston College	Receiving	Chris Pantale	4 receptions, 47 yards

== Roster ==
2010 Nevada Wolf Pack football team roster
Players
Coaches
Offense

Pos.	#	Name	Class
QB	1B	Harrison Stewart	Fr
RB	4E	Reid Adams	Fr
WR	4	Brandon Wimberly	So
RB	5	Mike Ball	So
WR	6J	Thai Ivery Jr.	Fr
QB	7	Corbin Louks	Jr
WR	9	Moe Patterson	Sr
QB	10	Colin Kaepernick (C)	Sr
QB	13	Mason Magleby	Fr
WR	14	Chris Wellington	Sr
WR	15	Rishard Matthews	Jr
QB	16	Tyler Lantrip	Jr
QB	17	Cody Fajardo	Fr
WR	18	L.J. Washington	So
WR	19	Malcolm Sheperd	Sr
WR	23	Shane Anderson	Jr
RB	25	Stefphon Jefferson	Fr
RB	29	Lampford Mark	Jr
RB	31	Kevin Grimes	Sr
RB	32	Nick Hale	So
RB	34	Vai Taua	Sr
RB	35	Courtney Randall	Sr
TE	43	DeAndre Roberts	Fr
TE	44	Zach Sudfeld	Jr
OL	59	Kyle Papendorf	Fr
OL	62	John Bender	Sr
OL	63	Avery Poates	Fr
OL	64	Brandon Grinstead	Fr
OL	65	Matt Galas	Fr
OL	66	Kyle Roberts	Fr
OL	67	Jeff Meads	Jr
OL	68	Steve Werner	Jr
OL	70	Joel Bitonio	Fr
OL	71	Jordan Mudge	Jr
OL	74	Steve Haley	Jr
OL	75	Chris Barker	So
OL	76	Mike Mitchell	Fr
OL	77	Alex Pinto	So
OL	78	Jeff Nady	So
OL	79	Jose Acuna	Sr
WR	80	Lemar Durant	Fr
WR	81	Aaron Bradley	Fr
WR	82	Tray Session	Jr
WR	83	Joseph Huber	Fr
TE	85	Virgil Green	Sr
TE	86	Kolby Arendse	So
WR	87	Necho Beard	Fr
WR	88	Michael Wyman	Fr
OL	89	Stephen Jeffers	Fr
OL	90	Jordan Hanson	Fr

Defense

Pos.	#	Name	Class
DB	1D	Christian Montanari	Fr
DB	2	Khalid Wooten	So
DB	3E	Gabe Lee	Fr
DB	3	Adam Liranzo	Sr
LB	4J	Brennan Locker	Jr
LB	5I	Ace Ward	Fr
DB	6	Doyle Miller	Sr
DB	8	Marlon Johnson	So
DL	8I	Orie Lupear	Fr
DB	11	Dean Faddis	So
LB	12	Kaelin Burnett	Jr
DB	20	Duke Williams	So
DB	22	Thaddeus Brown	So
DB	24	Charles Garrett	Fr
DB	28	Isaiah Frey	Jr
DB	30	Bubba Boudreaux	Jr
DB	33	Brandon Marshall	Jr
DB	37	Malik James	So
LB	42	DeAndre Boughton	Jr
DB	45	Evan Favors	Fr
LB	47	Brett Roy	Jr
DB	49	Aaron Brown	Fr
LB	50	Dray Bell	So
LB	51	Albert Rosette	So
LB	52	James-Michael Johnson	Jr
LB	54	Jeremiah Green	So
LB	55	Dontay Moch	Sr
LB	58	Ryan Coulson	Sr
DL	72	David Jamieson	Fr
DL	91	Scott Frisbie	Jr
DL	92	Mike Andrews	Jr
DL	93	Zack Madonick	Jr
DL	94	Brock Hekking	Fr
DL	95	Willie Faataualofa	Jr
DL	96	Jared Jackson	Sr
DL	97	Mark Avery	So
DL	98	Jack Reynoso	Fr
DL	99	Sam Foster	Fr

Special teams

Pos.	#	Name	Class
PK	3G	Jake Tyler	So
PK	39	Nick Rhodes	Jr
PK	40	Anthony Martinez	Fr
PK	46	Ricky Drake	Sr
P	48	Brad Langley	Sr
P	69	Jake Hurst	Jr

Head coach

- Chris Ault

Coordinators/assistant coaches

- Andy Buh – Defensive coordinator/linebackers
- Ken Wilson – Associate head coach/defensive Ends/linebackers
- Scott Baumgartner – Assistant coach
- James Ward – Cornerbacks
- Cameron Norcross – Offensive line/run game coordinator
- Jim Mastro – Running backs/recruiting coordinator
- James Spady – Tight ends/Assistant Offensive Line
- Barry Sacks – Defensive tackles
- Mike Bradeson – Safeties
- Casey Moore – Quality control/graduate assistant

Legend

- (C) Team captain
- (S) Suspended
- (I) Ineligible
- Injured
- Redshirt

Roster
Last update: January 25, 2021

== Players in the 2010 CFL draft ==
Player	Position	Round	Pick	CFL Club
John Bender	OL	3	17	Calgary Stampeders

== Players in the 2011 NFL draft ==
Player	Position	Round	Pick	NFL club
Colin Kaepernick	QB	2	36	San Francisco 49ers
Dontay Moch	LB	3	66	Cincinnati Bengals
Virgil Green	TE	7	204	Denver Broncos
