= 2011 Kraft Fight Hunger Bowl =

The 2011 Kraft Fight Hunger Bowl may refer to:

- 2011 Kraft Fight Hunger Bowl (January) – game following the 2010 season but played on January 9, 2011 between the Nevada Wolf Pack and the Boston College Eagles
- 2011 Kraft Fight Hunger Bowl (December) – game following the 2011 season between the UCLA Bruins and the Illinois Fighting Illini
