= Jeremiah Green (gridiron football) =

American gridiron football player (born 1990)

No. 45
- Position: Linebacker

Personal information
- Born: May 8, 1990 (age 36); Tulare, California, U.S.
- Listed height: 6 ft 2 in (1.88 m)
- Listed weight: 235 lb (107 kg)

Career information
- College: Nevada
- NFL draft: 2013: undrafted

Career history
- Jacksonville Jaguars (2013)*; San Jose SaberCats (2014)*; Ottawa Redblacks (2014)
- * Offseason or practice squad member only

Career CFL statistics
- Total tackles: 9
- Stats at CFL.ca (archived)

Jeremiah Anthony Green (born May 8, 1990) is an American former professional football linebacker. He played college football at the University of Nevada. He is the brother of Los Angeles Chargers tight end Virgil Green.

== Professional career ==
=== Jacksonville Jaguars ===
On April 27, 2013, Green signed with the Jacksonville Jaguars as an undrafted free agent following the 2013 NFL draft. He was released on August 25.

=== San Jose SaberCats ===
Green was assigned to the San Jose SaberCats of the Arena Football League on October 8, 2013. The SaberCats reassigned Green on November 6, 2013.

=== Ottawa Redblacks ===
Green signed a contract with the Ottawa Redblacks of the Canadian Football League on April 3, 2014. He was released by the Redblacks on September 6, 2014.
