= Vai Taua =

American football player and coach (born 1988)

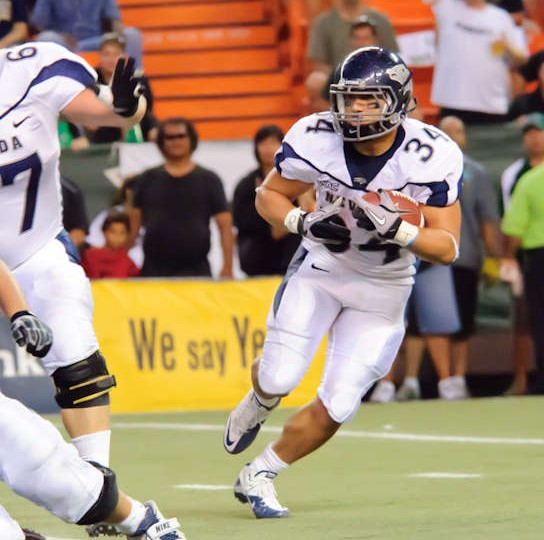
- Taua in 2010

Biographical details
- Born: October 11, 1988 (age 38); Fountain Valley, California, U.S.

Playing career
- 2006–2010: Nevada
- 2011: Buffalo Bills
- 2011–2012: Seattle Seahawks
- Position: Running back

Coaching career (HC unless noted)
- 2014–2015: UCLA (DB)
- 2016: East Los Angeles (co-ST/RB)
- 2017–2018: Nevada (special teams analyst)
- 2019–2021: Nevada (RB)
- 2021: Nevada (interim HC)
- 2022–2023: Nevada (AHC/RB)

Head coaching record
- Overall: 0–1
- Bowls: 0–1

Accomplishments and honors

Awards
- Third-team All-American (2010); 3× First-team All-WAC (2008, 2009, 2010); 2008 Sporting News WAC Offensive MVP

Vailala Lima Taua (/ˈvaɪ ˈtaʊ.ə/; born October 11, 1988) is an American football coach and former running back who was the interim head coach for the Nevada Wolf Pack. He played college football at Nevada, earning third-team All-American honors in 2010. He briefly played in the National Football League (NFL) as an undrafted free agent for the Buffalo Bills and Seattle Seahawks from 2011 to 2012.

== Early life ==
Taua was born in Fountain Valley, California, to Faletui and Taua Taua (Davis). He attended Cabrillo High School in Lompoc, California, where he played football and competed in track and field. He lettered in football all four years and twice in track and field. During his senior year, he ran for 1,709 yards and 27 touchdowns. Taua led the Los Padres League in rushing and was named the conference's Most Valuable Player. He also earned all-conference and All-California Interscholastic Federation honors.

== College career ==
Taua sat out the 2006 as a redshirt and in 2007 saw action in eight games with 19 carries for 112 yards (including one touchdown). In 2008, Taua began the year as a reserve but became a starter after senior running back and 2007 Western Athletic Conference (WAC) rushing leader Luke Lippincott suffered a season-ending injury in the second game. Playing in all 13 games that season, he rushed for 1,521 yards on 236 carries (including 15 touchdowns) and also made 29 receptions for 226 yards (including two touchdowns). Against Fresno State, Taua ran for his season high of 263 yards on 28 carries, for which he was named the WAC Offensive Player of the Week. In that game, he broke the 1,000-yard rushing mark for the season. With Taua and quarterback Colin Kaepernick, 2008 became the first season in Nevada school history that the team had two 1,000-yard rushers. Taua was named to the All-WAC first-team and the Sporting News named him the WAC's Most Valuable Offensive Player.

On December 19, 2009, it was announced that Taua was academically ineligible and would sit out the Hawaii Bowl on Christmas Eve against SMU. His future with the Wolf Pack team was put in doubt, with head coach Chris Ault's stating that he would "evaluate (Taua's) future with the team after the bowl game." On January 8, 2010, Ault held a press conference in which he stated that he wanted to "punch [Taua] right in the mouth" for his failure to meet academic expectations and missing the Hawaii Bowl. Ault added that Taua would return to the team for his senior season and the issue of his academic performance would be dealt with "in house".

=== Collegiate statistics ===
Year	Team	G	Rushing				Receiving			
Year	Team	G	Att	Yards	Avg	TD	Rec	Yards	Avg	TD
2007	Nevada	8	19	112	5.9	1	1	3	3.0	0
2008	Nevada	13	236	1,521	6.4	15	30	243	8.1	3
2009	Nevada	11	172	1,345	7.8	10	12	99	8.2	2
2010	Nevada	13	262	1,619	5.7	19	18	226	12.6	3
Career		46	711	4,588	6.5	45	61	571	9.4	8

== Professional career ==
=== Buffalo Bills ===
Taua went undrafted during the 2011 NFL draft. On July 27, 2011, Taua signed as a free agent with the Buffalo Bills, but was later waived on August 5.

=== Seattle Seahawks ===
On August 14, 2011, Taua signed with the Seattle Seahawks. He was waived on August 22, but was re-signed on August 24. He was cut to trim the team regular season roster to 53 members on September 3, 2011. Taua re-signed on January 11, 2012 and was released on September 12, 2012.

== Coaching career ==
Taua was a coach at the University of California, Los Angeles (UCLA), where his brother Ainnuu played. He also was a running backs coach at East Los Angeles College.

At Nevada, Taua acted as a special teams assistant in 2017 and 2018 before serving as the running backs coach from 2019 to 2021. On December 6, 2021, Taua was named as the team's interim head coach for the 2021 Quick Lane Bowl after Nevada head coach Jay Norvell left the program to take a vacant head coaching job at Colorado State. Taua was named as assistant head coach for incoming head coach Ken Wilson prior to the 2022 season.

== Personal life ==
Taua has three brothers and two sisters. He has a son, Tamali'i. Two of his brothers also played FBS football: his brother Ainnuu played at UCLA, and his brother Toa played football at Nevada.

== Head coaching record ==
Year	Team	Overall	Conference	Standing	Bowl/playoffs
Nevada Wolf Pack (Mountain West Conference) (2021)
2021	Nevada	0–1	N/A	N/A	L Quick Lane (Note: Taua acted as the interim head coach for the 2021 Quick Lane Bowl as former head coach Jay Norvell had left the program prior to the game)
Nevada:		0–1			
Total:		0–1			

== See also ==
- List of college football yearly rushing leaders
