= Nevada Wolf Pack football =

American athletic football program of the University of Nevada, Reno

2026 Nevada Wolf Pack football team
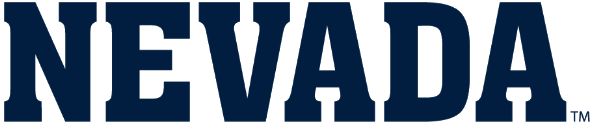
- First season: 1896; 130 years ago
- Athletic director: Stephanie Rempe
- Head coach: Jeff Choate; 3rd season, 7–19 (.269)
- Location: Reno, Nevada
- Stadium: Mackay Stadium (capacity: 27,000)
- Field: Chris Ault Field
- NCAA division: Division I FBS
- Conference: Mountain West
- Colors: Navy blue and silver
- All-time record: 583–540–33 (.519)
- Bowl record: 7–12 (.368)

Conference championships
- FWC: 1932, 1933, 1939 Big Sky: 1983, 1986, 1990, 1991, 1992, 1994, 1995, 1996, 1997 WAC: 2005, 2010
- Consensus All-Americans: 1
- Rivalries: UNLV (rivalry); Boise State (rivalry); San Jose State; Fresno State; UC Davis
- Fight song: "Nevada Fight Song"
- Mascot: Alphie, Wolfie Jr., and Luna
- Marching band: Pride of the Sierra
- Website: NevadaWolfPack.com

The Nevada Wolf Pack football program represents the University of Nevada, Reno, in college football. The Wolf Pack compete in the Mountain West Conference at the Football Bowl Subdivision level of the NCAA Division I. It was founded on October 24, 1896, as the Sagebrushers in Reno, Nevada.

The Wolf Pack's home field is Mackay Stadium, located at the north end of its campus in Reno, having been moved from it original location which opened on October 23, 1909. The "new" Mackay Stadium saw its first game 60 years ago on October 1, 1966 with a seating capacity of 7,500 and has undergone several renovations. The stadium seats 27,000 and has played to crowds in excess (see attendance records), but decreased its capacity from 30,000 to 26,000 by the 2016 season to increase the quality of the experience in the stadium and later increased its capacity to 27,000 by the 2017 season. The elevation of its playing field is 4,610 feet (1,410 m) above sea level.

Nevada has had three individuals inducted into the College Football Hall of Fame. They are coach Chris Ault, running back Frank Hawkins, and former coach Buck Shaw. Fullback Marion Motley is the only Nevada player to be inducted into the Pro Football Hall of Fame. Three-time Super Bowl champion Charles Mann played for Nevada from 1979 to 1982 while being named Most Valuable Defensive Lineman in 1982. Mann was inducted into the Nevada Athletics Hall of Fame in 1995. Another Nevada alumnus with a long career in the NFL was free safety Brock Marion. He was selected in the seventh round of the 1993 NFL draft by the Dallas Cowboys where he played most of his career, and won two Super Bowls. Marion was selected to three Pro Bowls and one All-Pro team.

Nevada has not fielded a Heisman Trophy winner; however, Stan Heath was fifth in Heisman voting in 1948 and Colin Kaepernick (QB) was eighth among 2010 candidates. Nevada football's rich tradition has produced 40 All-Americans and 45 All-American selections. Nevada's only consensus All-American was Matt Clafton (LB) in 1991, which was Nevada's last year in the Division I-AA; the Wolf Pack is awaiting its first FBS consensus All-American. The Wolf Pack has also produced two Academic All-Americans: David Heppe (P, 1982) and Erick Streelman (TE, 2002)

== History ==
=== Early history (1896–1958) ===
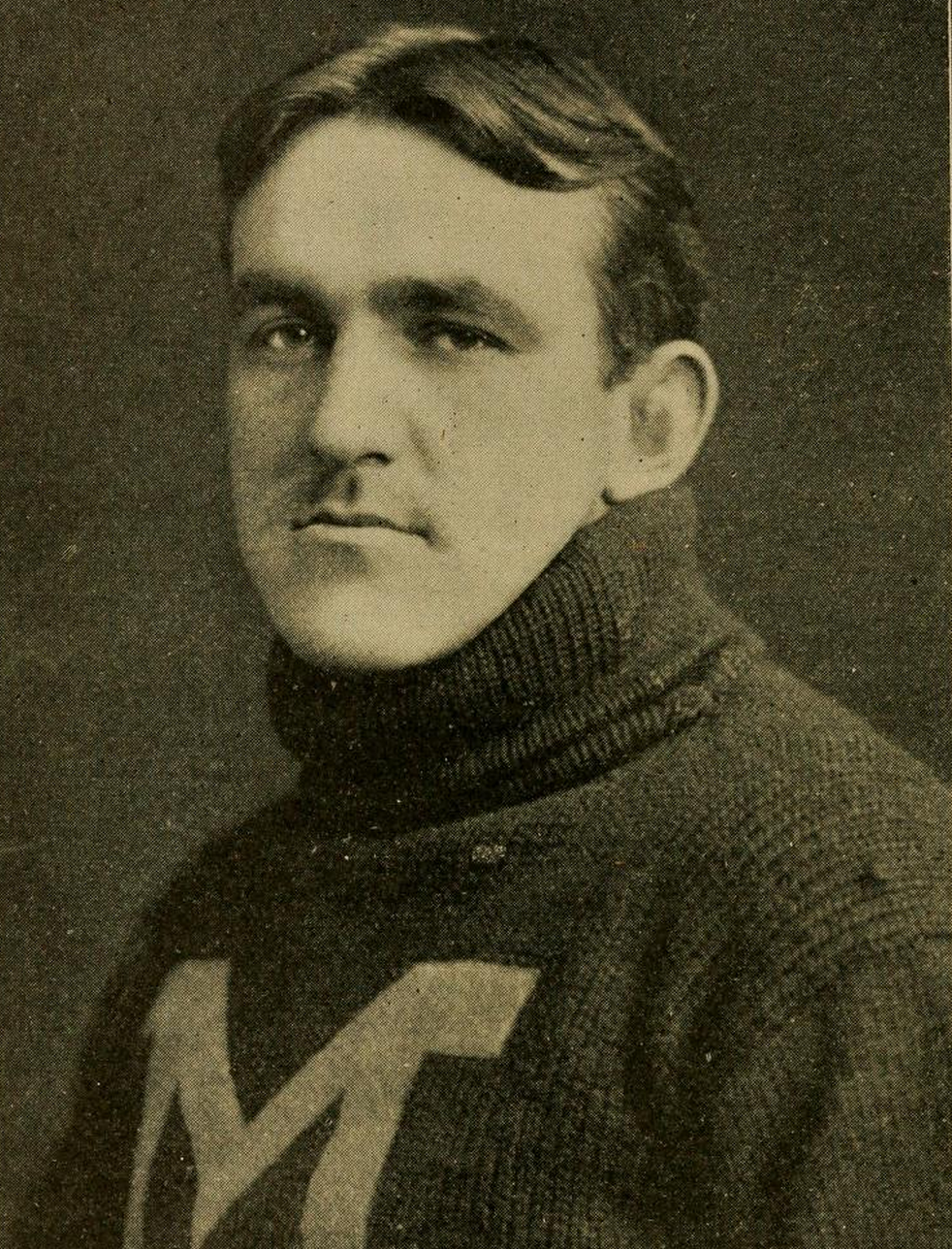
Allen Steckle served as head coach from 1901 to 1903

Nevada's football history began on October 24, 1896. However, there was no football program from 1906 to 1914 (only rugby), in 1918 (due to World War I) and in 1951.

In 1896, the university, at that time the only institution of higher learning in the state of Nevada and called by the moniker Nevada State University, investigated the possibility of adding football to their short list of athletic programs and hired Frank Taylor from the University of California, Berkeley for the purpose of developing and fielding the U's first gridiron squadron. They played only three games that year, the first was Wadsworth AC and the second of which was scheduled against the Belmont preparatory school to take place on "the hill" at the original Mackay Stadium, located in the depression at the middle of campus where the Mack Social Sciences, Reynolds School of Journalism and the auspicious Lecture Hall currently exist. The result was a complete debacle as Belmont relentlessly thrashed the hapless Sagebrushers (later Wolf Pack) by the tally of 70–0. "But," the University of Nevada yearbook Artemesia would report five years later, "the team learned something about football by watching the Belmont boys play." Two weeks later and the 'Brushers met up with the Berkeley "Second Eleven" with much more favorable results (with NSU only giving up forty points). "Thus the initial chapter of the athletic history of the University was one of defeat", according to the 1901 Artemesia.

From 1901 to 1903, Allen Steckle served as the head football coach at the University of Nevada. In 1903, he was also appointed to the position as the university's physical director. In his three seasons as the head coach, he compiled a 6–9–2 record. When Steckle's Nevada Sagebrush team defeated the University of California in 1903, it was the cause of a statewide celebration. The entire front page of the Daily Nevada State Journal was given to coverage of the game, and the banner headline read: "California's Proud Colors Lowered by the Doughty Eleven from Sagebrushdom". Steckle's picture appeared on the front page, and the paper praised his efforts in turning Nevada into a football power:

Out of the eighty students of the N.S.U. have been selected eleven young men who were moulded into shape by Dr. Steckle, the best football coach who ever came to the Coast. He made of them the peers of the flower of the California universities.

The victory of a university with only 80 students over the University of California with its 3,000 students was hailed as a historic accomplishment, and "Coach Steckle's brand of 'roughhouse'" play was given much of the credit.

Steckle's star players at Nevada from 1901 to 1903 were his younger brother Ivan X. Steckle, who played halfback, and Abe Steckle, who played tackle. Ivan Steckle was reportedly "the hero of all Nevada during the football season of 1903, when in a game with the University of California on the U.C. field, he grabbed the football close to the Nevada goal line and made a wonderful 86-yard run to the California goal line, scoring a touchdown for the Sagebrush players and bringing victory to the team." Ivan left Nevada after the 1903 season to follow his older brother to the University of Michigan Medical School. Ivan died from typhoid fever in 1909, and Steckle accompanied his brother's body to the family's old home in Freeport, Michigan.

In 1919, a Nevada newspaper rated Steckle as the best football coach Nevada ever had and described his accomplishments as follows:

It was under the coaching of Dr. Steckle that Nevada was able to defeat the University of California and play a tie with Stanford as well as bang it over the crack athletic club teams that San Francisco boasted when the great college game was in its hey dey. He was rated at that time as one of the best coaches in the West.

Steckle was also remembered at Nevada for his ability to instill "college spirit" in the school's student body. In 1919, a Nevada newspaper noted that "there was more enthusiasm displayed in college athletics while he was coach than there has been in all the years since he left." As a medical doctor and athletic coach, Steckle was also known for his belief in physical conditioning. He was known to require every athlete to be in perfect physical condition before playing in any intercollegiate or "big" game. After his success with the 1903 Nevada team, Steckle was offered a higher salary to take over as the football coach at Oregon State.

In April 1919, Ray Courtright was hired to serve as director of athletics and head coach of the football, basketball, baseball and track teams. Courtright was Nevada's football coach for five years from 1919 to 1923. During his years at Nevada, Courtright was "affectionately known as 'Corky'." In his first year as Nevada's coach, Courtright led the team to an 8–1–1 record, doubling the highest season win total of any prior Nevada football team. The only loss came in the first game of the season, a 13–7 loss to the California freshman team. Courtright's 1919 Nevada team outscored its opponents 450 to 32, including scores of 132–0 over Pacific, 102–0 over the Mare Island Marines, and 56–0 over UC Davis. At the time, Courtright called the 1919 Nevada team "the best team I ever had," and others called it the "best team that ever played on Mackay Field." At the end of the 1919 season, the Reno Evening Gazette wrote:

It was a good move when the students and regents decided last spring to go east and get one of the best men to come to Nevada and build up a football team. In selecting a coach they also demanded an all-round man, who could coach basket ball, track, baseball and put into operation a regular system of physical culture for all the students as well. Coach Courtright fitted the requirements and the football season proves the wisdom of the selection ...

In 1920, Courtright's team finished with a record of 7–3–1 with wins over both the Utah Utes (14–7) and Utah State Aggies (21–0), and losses to California (79–7), USC (38–7), and Santa Clara (27–21). Courtright never reached the same level of success after the 1920 season, finishing 4–3–1 in 1921, 5–3–1 in 1922 and 2–3–3 in 1923. However, his most notable game at Nevada was a scoreless tie with California on November 3, 1923. The 1923 California team was known as the "Wonder Team." It had gone through three full seasons without a loss, and had outscored its opponents 151 to 0 in the first seven games of the 1923 season. Nevada had only 15 men on its football team in 1923 and was considered to be a decided underdog. When Courtright returned to the Nevada campus in 1961, he was shown souvenirs of his time at the school. Ty Cobb, then a sports columnist, accompanied Courtright and wrote: "Courtright chuckled when he saw a huge framed layout of newspaper headlines from 1923 – when Nevada tied the great California 'Wonder Team.' 'Yep, that WAS quite a game,' he chortled." Courtright compiled a record of 26–13–7 while at Nevada, and his teams outscored opponents by a combined total of 993 to 464. Shortly before his resignation in 1924, the Nevada State Journal credited Courtright with having "brought the Nevada eleven from the class of a second rate team to its present rank among the best of the western college football squads."

Jim Aiken left Akron to take over Nevada's football program in 1939, and served as head coach for seven seasons, compiling a record of 38–26–4. Aiken resigned as head coach after the 1946 season to accept the head coaching position at Oregon.

Nevada experienced back to back nine-win seasons under Aiken's successor, Joe Sheeketski, 9–2 campaigns in 1947 and 1948, but the wheels came off the next two seasons as Nevada compiled records of 5–5 and 1–9, resulting in his resignation.

Jake Lawlor was the head coach from 1952 to 1954.

Gordon McEachron accepted the head coaching position at Nevada in 1955 for a $7,300 salary. The university had demoted its football program from major college football status in 1951 due to a budget deficit and had struggled to remain competitive. In 1956, the Nevada alumni association raised $4,500 for a part-time work program for football players. The initiative, however, failed, and in October 1957, McEachron supported the players in their petition for a renewal of free room and board for the team during the season. They offered to work part-time campus jobs in exchange. McEachron said, "We're not trying to go big-time again, just to compete on an equal basis." McEachron offered his resignation on October 30, 1957, which reportedly "came as a complete surprise" to the athletic director. Art Broten said, "But I am totally indifferent—Mac took the job with the understanding we gave no aid to athletes." McEachron remained on for one more year and resigned in 1959. He had compiled a 6–23–1 record at Nevada.

=== Dick Trachok era (1959–1968) ===
In April 1959, Nevada hired Dick Trachok as its head coach. In November 1960, Trachok canceled a six-hour flight to Denver in favor of a 32-hour bus ride after a plane crash killed sixteen players from California Polytechnic. The Nevada flight had been booked with Arctic-Pacific, the same carrier that Cal Poly had used. Trachok finished his coaching tenure with a 40–48–3 record, and took over as Nevada's athletic director. He held that post until 1986. In 1975, the university inducted Trachok into the Nevada Athletics Hall of Fame.

=== Jerry Scattini era (1969–1975) ===
The University of Nevada, Reno hired Scattini as its head football coach, a position he held from 1969 to 1975. His teams compiled a 37–36–1 record. Scattini was fired in December 1975 after a 3–8 season and was replaced with UNLV assistant Chris Ault.

=== Chris Ault era, first stint (1976–1992) ===
The winningest coach in school history is Chris Ault who was hired in 1976 after spending 3 years as assistant coach at UNLV under head coach Ron Meyer. Both Ault and Meyer left UNLV on the same year.

The Wolf Pack competed in Division I-AA since the formation of that division in 1978, moving up from Division II and were undefeated as in the regular season. Before joining the Big Sky Conference in 1979, Nevada competed in the Far West Conference and was an independent in football for a decade. Nevada played in the Division I-AA playoffs in its first two seasons, when just four teams were selected. They returned to the national semi-finals in 1983 and 1985, when the playoffs included 12 teams and 1986 with a 16-team field. The Wolf Pack reached the national championship game in 1990 and the quarterfinals in 1991.

In its 14 years in Division I-AA, Nevada made the playoffs seven times, and went undefeated during the regular season three times (1978, 1986, 1991), compiling an overall record of 122–47–1 (.721). Nevada had a record of 9–7 in the I-AA playoffs during their time in the Big Sky and in 13 years of membership, the Wolf Pack won four conference titles (1983, 1986, 1990, 1991). During most of its I-AA era, the school was known as "Nevada-Reno," "UNR" or "Reno."

In its final season in Division I-AA in 1991, the top-ranked Wolf Pack recorded what still stands as one of the biggest comebacks in Division I NCAA football history when they defeated Weber State 55–49, after trailing by 35 points in the second half at home. Backup sophomore quarterback Chris Vargas led a second-half Nevada comeback of 41 unanswered points to win the game. After the game, Vargas was given the nickname, "The Comeback Kid," and would become one of the greatest quarterbacks to play for the Wolf Pack.

Nevada moved up to Division I-A in 1992 when it joined the Big West Conference. The change from Division I-AA to Division I-A brought a lot of excitement to Wolf Pack fans. That year, Nevada became the first NCAA football team to win a conference championship in its first Division I-A season. Nevada won the 1992 Big West title after beating Utah State in the final conference game of the season. Led by Vargas again coming off the bench, Nevada came from behind late in the 4th quarter to win, 48–47.

=== Jeff Horton era (1993) ===
Jeff Horton was promoted from wide receiver coach to head coach following Ault's first retirement. Horton resigned as head coach after the end of the season and later joined UNLV by the following year.

=== Jeff Tisdel era (1996–1999) ===
Jeff Tisdel was an All-American quarterback for the Wolf Pack in the 1970s, then in Division II. He was promoted from assistant coach to head coach following Ault's second retirement. Tisdel's first season saw the Wolf Pack go 9–3 with a win in the Las Vegas Bowl, but from there things went downhill. In 1997, the Wolf Pack compiled a record of 5–6, then a 6–5 mark in 1998 before a 3–9 mark in 1999 and Tisdel resigned after the end of the season.

=== Chris Tormey era (2000–2003) ===
Following the 1999 season, Idaho head coach Chris Tormey moved south from his alma mater on the Palouse to lead Nevada, which was leaving the Big West to join the WAC. He succeeded alumnus Jeff Tisdel and compiled a 16–31 (.340) record over four seasons (2000–2003). While his win totals improved each season (2, 3, 5, 6), he was released from the fifth and final season of his contract at the end of the 2003 season, the final game marked by a 56–3 blowout loss at No. 18 Boise State. Most notably, Tormey failed to defeat bitter in-state rival UNLV in the annual Battle for the Fremont Cannon; his teams were also winless against Boise State and Fresno State. The Wolf Pack did defeat the Washington Huskies 28–17 in Seattle that final season (UW finished at 6–6.) Tormey was fired after the end of the season and athletic director Ault hired himself to succeed Tormey. In 2000, Nevada left the Big West and joined the Western Athletic Conference (WAC), hoping to upgrade its athletic program.

=== Chris Ault era, third stint (2004–2012) ===
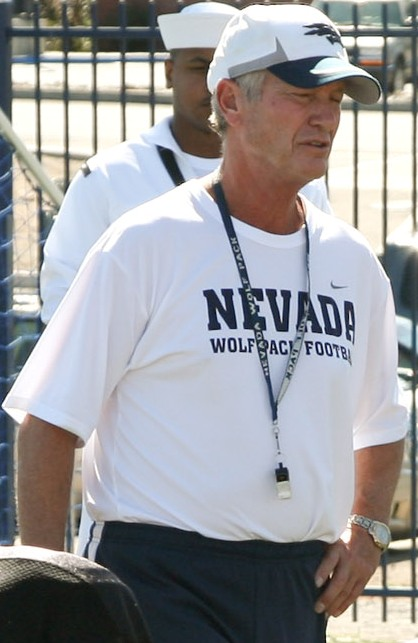
Chris Ault

In 2005, the Wolf Pack won a share of the Western Athletic Conference title after defeating an AP top 25 ranked team for the first time in school history, the No. 16 Fresno State Bulldogs, 38-35, in Reno. The Wolf Pack would go on to score their first bowl game victory since 1996, defeating the UCF Golden Knights in the Hawaii Bowl on a missed PAT in a thrilling 49-48 overtime victory.

In 2007, the Wolf Pack and the Boise State Broncos played in a historic game on October 14, setting a new NCAA Football Bowl Subdivision record for total points scored with 136. Boise State won the game 69–67 in the second half of the fourth overtime period, when Broncos LB Tim Brady stopped Nevada's freshman QB Colin Kaepernick on the mandatory two-point conversion attempt.

In 2009, Nevada players QB Colin Kaepernick, RB Vai Taua, and RB Luke Lippincott became the first trio of teammates in NCAA history to each rush for more than 1,000 yards in the same season.

In 2010, Nevada would have their best season in school history. Led by future NFL second-round draft pick Colin Kaepernick, Nevada would win a share of its first WAC title since 2005, only losing one game against Hawaii on its way to a 13–1 record. The Wolf Pack defeated power conference foes California, BYU on the road, and Boston College in the Kraft Fight Hunger Bowl. Most significantly, however, Nevada would defeat No. 4 Boise State in overtime, 34-31, destroying the Broncos’ certain invitation to a BCS game. It was Nevada’s first ever win against an AP top 10 ranked opponent, and their first win over the Broncos since 1998. Nevada would close the year ranked No. 11 in the AP poll, the only time the Wolf Pack have ever finished a season ranked.

On August 18, 2010, Nevada accepted an invitation to the Mountain West Conference along with Fresno State. Nevada and Fresno State have left the WAC and started the play in the Mountain West Conference in 2012. Both programs have joined Boise State who also left the WAC for the Mountain West in 2011. The move to the Mountain West placed Nevada in the same conference as in-state rival UNLV for the first time since 1995.

In 2012, Nevada left the WAC and moved to the Mountain West Conference (MW), along with fellow WAC member Fresno State, as part of the 2010–13 Mountain West Conference realignment. This move was influenced by Boise State's entrance, the increased strength of schedule and the intensity of Nevada's rivalries.

Ault was the head coach for Nevada for 28 seasons and was involved with Nevada football for 40 years before stepping down as head coach after the 2012 season. His record as Nevada head coach ended at 233 wins, 109 losses and 1 tie. Ault won 10 conference titles in the Big Sky, Big West and Western Athletic Conference. The only problem was his 2–8 bowl record. Ault brought popularity to the Pistol Offense when he implemented it after returning to the sideline during the 2004 season. Since then, the Pistol Offense has been used by multiple teams at every level of football including the NFL. Ault also served as the Nevada Athletics Director from 1986 to 2004 and played quarterback for Nevada from 1965 to 1967. In 2002, Ault was inducted into the College Football Hall of Fame. The field at Mackay Stadium was named Chris Ault Field in 2013 in appreciation for his numerous accomplishments.

=== Brian Polian era (2013–2016) ===
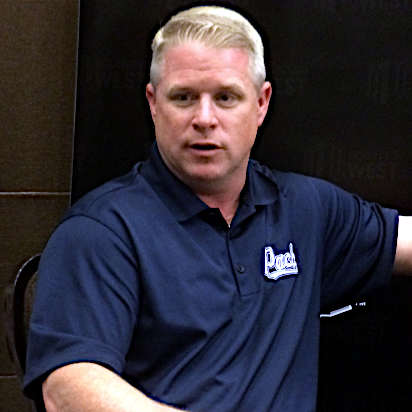
Brian Polian

Texas A&M special teams coordinator and tight ends coach Brian Polian was hired as Nevada's 25th head coach following Ault's third retirement. Under Polian, the Wolf Pack compiled a record of 23–27 that included back to back seven-win campaigns and bowl appearances. Nevada and Polian agreed to part ways after the 2016 season. Polian later returned to the Notre Dame Fighting Irish football as special teams coordinator under head coach Brian Kelly after previously serving under head coach Charlie Weis from 2005 to 2009.

=== Jay Norvell era (2017–2021) ===
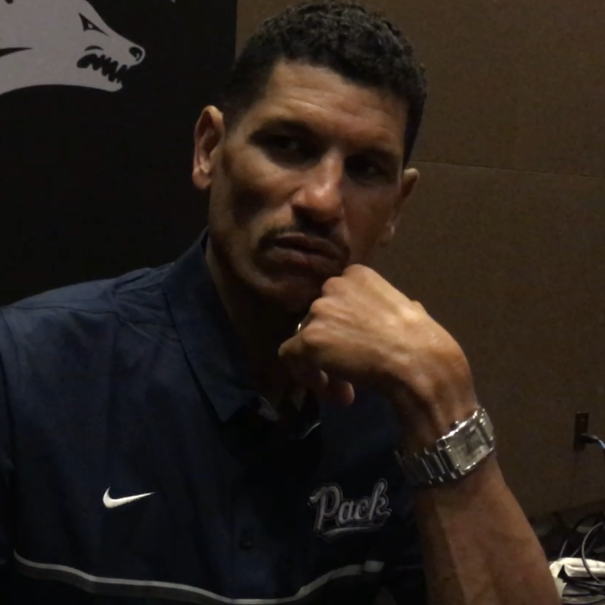
Jay Norvell

On December 6, 2016, Arizona State wide receivers coach and passing game coordinator Jay Norvell was hired as Nevada's 26th head coach. Norvell's Wolf Pack posted four winning seasons in his five-year tenure and appeared in four post-season bowl games. Norvell led quarterback Carson Strong to receiving the Mountain West Conference Offensive Player of the Year award in both 2020 and 2021, becoming the fifth player in conference history to win the award in back-to-back years. On December 6, 2021, it was announced that Norvell was hired by Colorado State as their next head coach, ending his time at Nevada.

It was announced that Nevada running back coach Vai Taua would act as interim head coach and coach the Wolf Pack in the 2021 Quick Lane Bowl.

=== Ken Wilson era (2022–2023) ===
On December 10, 2021, Oregon linebackers coach Ken Wilson was hired as Nevada's 27th head coach. Wilson was also a Nevada assistant from 1989 to 1998, and again from 2004 to 2012. On August 27, 2022, Wilson won his first game at New Mexico State 23–12. He finished 2022 2–10 and 0–8 in conference play.

On October 21, 2023, he won his first Mountain West game at San Diego State, 6–0, also the lowest scoring shutout of the 2023 college football season. The Pack would finish 2023 with a record of 2–10 again and 2–6 in conference play.

On December 1, 2023, Wilson was fired after a record of 4–20 in two seasons.

=== Jeff Choate era (2024–present) ===
On December 4, 2023, Texas co-defensive coordinator Jeff Choate was hired as Nevada's 28th head coach. Choate made his coaching debut in a 29–24 home loss to SMU on August 24, 2024. Choate won his first game as Nevada coach on August 31, 2024 at Troy, 28–26.

The Wolf Pack ended up finishing the 2024 season with a 0–7 Mountain West Conference record and a 3–10 overall standing.

=== Conference affiliations ===
- Independent (1896–1924)
- Far Western Conference (1925–1939)
- Independent (1940–1953)
- Far Western Conference (1954–1968)
- NCAA College Division independent (1969–1972)
- NCAA Division II independent (1973–1977)
- NCAA Division I-AA independent (1978)
- Big Sky Conference (1979–1991)
- Big West Conference (1992–1999)
- Western Athletic Conference (2000–2011)
- Mountain West Conference (2012–present)

== Conference championships ==
Nevada has won 14 conference championships (six shared, eight outright) as a member of four different conferences as of 2025.

Season	Conference	Coach	Record	Conference record
1932 †	Far Western	Brick Mitchell	3–3–2	2–0–1
1933	Far Western	Brick Mitchell	4–4	3–0
1939	Far Western	Jim Aiken	5–4	3–0
1983	Big Sky Conference	Chris Ault	10–4 (Note: In 1985, UNLV was forced to forfeit all 7 wins from the 1983 season and all 11 wins from the 1984 season, including their victory in the California Bowl. Chris Ault and his team were given a win on the Fremont Cannon as a result. See Wikipedia:WikiProject College football/Vacated victories for an explanation of how vacated victories are recorded.)	6–1
1986	Big Sky Conference	Chris Ault	13–1	7–0
1990	Big Sky Conference	Chris Ault	13–2	7–1
1991	Big Sky Conference	Chris Ault	12–1	8–0
1992	Big West Conference	Chris Ault	7–5	5–1
1994 †	Big West Conference	Chris Ault	9–2	5–1
1995	Big West Conference	Chris Ault	9–3	6–0
1996 †	Big West Conference	Jeff Tisdel	9–3	4–1
1997 †	Big West Conference	Jeff Tisdel	5–6	4–1
2005 †	Western Athletic Conference	Chris Ault	9–3	7–1
2010 †	Western Athletic Conference	Chris Ault	13–1	7–1

† Co-championship

== Playoff records ==
Season	Round	Opponent	Result
1978	Semifinal	Massachusetts	L 21–44
1979	Semifinal	at Eastern Kentucky	L 30–33^{2OT}
1983	1st Round	at Idaho State	W 27–20
1983	Quarterfinal	North Texas	W 20–17^{OT}
1983	Semifinal	at Southern Illinois	L 7–23
1985	1st Round	Arkansas State	W 24–23
1985	Quarterfinal	at Furman	L 12–35
1986	1st Round	Idaho	W 27–7
1986	Quarterfinal	Tennessee State	W 33–6
1986	Semi-Final	Georgia Southern	L 38–48
1990	1st Round	Louisiana-Monroe	W 27–14
1990	Quarterfinal	Furman	W 42–35^{3OT}
1990	Semifinal	Boise State	W 59–52^{3OT}
1990	Championship	at Georgia Southern	L 13–36
1991	1st Round	McNeese State	W 22–16
1991	Quarterfinal	Youngstown State	L 28–30

The Division I-AA playoffs included only four teams in 1978;
the field was expanded to eight in 1981, twelve in 1982, and sixteen in 1986.

== Bowl games ==
Nevada has participated in 19 bowl games, with the Wolf Pack garnering a record of 7–12.

Season	Coach	Bowl	Opponent	Result
1947	Joe Sheeketski	Salad Bowl	North Texas	W 13–6
1948	Joe Sheeketski	Harbor Bowl	Villanova	L 7–27
1992	Chris Ault	Las Vegas Bowl	Bowling Green	L 34–35
1995	Chris Ault	Las Vegas Bowl	Toledo	L 37–40^{OT}
1996	Jeff Tisdel	Las Vegas Bowl	Ball State	W 18–15
2005	Chris Ault	Hawai'i Bowl	UCF	W 49–48^{OT}
2006	Chris Ault	MPC Computers Bowl	Miami (FL)	L 20–21
2007	Chris Ault	New Mexico Bowl	New Mexico	L 0–23
2008	Chris Ault	Humanitarian Bowl	Maryland	L 35–42
2009	Chris Ault	Hawai'i Bowl	SMU	L 10–45
2010	Chris Ault	Kraft Fight Hunger Bowl	Boston College	W 20–13
2011	Chris Ault	Hawai'i Bowl	Southern Miss	L 17–24
2012	Chris Ault	New Mexico Bowl	Arizona	L 48–49
2014	Brian Polian	New Orleans Bowl	Louisiana–Lafayette	L 3–16
2015	Brian Polian	Arizona Bowl	Colorado State	W 28–23
2018	Jay Norvell	Arizona Bowl	Arkansas State	W 16–13^{OT}
2019	Jay Norvell	Famous Idaho Potato Bowl	Ohio	L 21–30
2020	Jay Norvell	Famous Idaho Potato Bowl	Tulane	W 38–27
2021	Vai Taua†	Quick Lane Bowl	Western Michigan	L 24–52

† = Interim head coach

== Rivalries ==
=== UNLV ===
The Battle for Nevada

The Nevada and UNLV Football programs have a strong disdain for each other. The in-state rivalry started on November 22, 1969, and had not been played from 1980 to 1982 and in 1984, 1986 and 1988 respectively. Nevada maintains an overall 27–18 lead in the series. The Fremont Cannon was introduced as the rivalry trophy in 1970 by Bill Ireland, who attended Nevada and was UNLV's first football coach.

Unlike the Rivalry with Boise State, the Fremont Cannon rivalry has lacked many games of importance. Nevada and UNLV have spent many years in different conferences. The mid-1990s being the exception when both schools were in the Big West. This time period also marks where a lot of the bitterness between the two schools came from. Nevada had just moved to the Big West from Division I-AA and had enjoyed success after winning a conference title in 1992. After his first coaching retirement, Chris Ault was replaced by Jeff Horton as the head coach in 1993. After one season Horton left for the same position at rival UNLV. Chris Ault would return to the Nevada sideline to coach Nevada in 1994 and 1995 until he could find another coach. In 1994, Nevada and UNLV would go on to become co-champions of the Big West, but UNLV won the head-to-head game against Nevada sending them to the post season bowl game. The next season the game was marred by pre and post game fights between both teams and with many fights between fans in the stands. Nevada would go on to win the game and the conference title outright. Since then the rivalry has lost some of its luster, but as of 2012, Nevada and UNLV became members of the same conference once again.

The Fremont Cannon is the heaviest and most expensive trophy in college football. The current holder of the trophy is UNLV after defeating Nevada 45-27 on October 14, 2023. Nevada leads the all-time series 29-20 as of 2023.

=== Boise State ===
Nevada has a long-standing rivalry with Boise State; the teams first met on September 25, 1971, and have played each other over 45 times as of 2022. The rivalry with Boise State does not seem to contain the same amount of bitterness as Nevada's intrastate rivalry against UNLV.

Some of the most important games in the history of both programs have been played against each other. In 1990, Nevada won the Big Sky Championship with an overall season record of 13–2. Nevada's only regular season loss was a 30–14 conference loss to the Broncos in Boise. Nevada and Boise State would both go on to the Division I-AA playoffs. The two teams met in the 1990 Division I-AA semifinals in Reno for a rematch of their earlier battle that year. With the winner going to the championship, the game took 3 overtime sessions. Nevada fullback Ray Whalen scored the decisive touchdown in the third overtime with an 8-yard run into the end zone. Nevada's defense held Boise State after the score on their turn during the alternating overtime sessions. This game was the second game in a row that Nevada needed 3 overtime periods to finish the game. (Nevada had defeated Furman the week prior in a triple overtime game.) There have been no other games postseason games played between the two teams to date. Nevada went to lose in the finals to Georgia Southern by a score of 36–13 in Statesboro, Georgia.

In 2006, Nevada and Boise State would meet in Reno in Boise State's final regular season game. Boise State won the game, capping off an undefeated regular season and giving the Broncos a birth into the Fiesta Bowl. This would be Boise State's first BCS bowl game, where they would go on to beat Oklahoma in dramatic fashion. In 2008, the Broncos traveled to Reno, once again with aspirations of an undefeated regular season and BCS appearance. The Broncos defeated the Wolfpack in a nail-biter, coming down to the last play of the game. In 2009, the Wolfpack traveled to Boise, ID to face the Broncos in the hopes of foiling their undefeated season and BCS aspirations. Boise would end up winning the game and went on to win their second Fiesta Bowl in 4 years against TCU. In 2010, the two teams met in what would come to be known as the greatest win in Nevada football history and the most devastating loss in Boise State football history. Nevada overcame a 24-7 halftime deficit to tie Boise with 10 seconds remaining. On the last play of the game, Boise quarterback Kellen Moore threw a hail mary to receiver Titus Young, who dove and caught the ball close to the goal line with one second left. Extreme drama would ensue, as Boise State kicker Kyle Brotzman missed a chip-shot field goal from straight ahead, sending the game into overtime. Kyle Brotzman went on to miss another chip-shot field goal in overtime and the game was sealed by a field goal from Nevada's Anthony Martinez. Nevada beat Boise State 34–31, ending the Broncos' chances of playing in the Rose Bowl, and at the time, a potential BCS National Title. In 2011, Boise was once again undefeated and ranked in the top 10 when the Wolfpack visited Boise. With the usual BCS aspirations on the line, the Broncos defeated the Wolfpack at home in a fairly non-competitive matchup. This would be the last game that was crucially important between the two programs. Since 2011, the rivalry heat has continued, however, neither team has had much to lose in comparison to the games played between 2004 and 2011.

=== Fresno State ===
The Sierra Showdown

The 'Sierra Showdown' is named after the Sierra Nevada mountain range that runs along the California-Nevada border and is near the two cities of Fresno, CA and Reno, NV. As recent as November 2022 there was case made for the Nevada-Fresno State football game to add a Sierra Showdown Trophy Paul Loeffler, the voice of the Fresno State Bulldogs, suggested on Twitter that Nevada and Fresno State should play for the Sierra Showdown Trophy that is half silver (for the Silver State) and half gold (for the Golden State). Loeffler was quoted as saying "You guys are on the eastern side of the Sierra. You're looking at the other side of the mountains that we're looking at from the western side. We have to go through or over that pass to play each other. We've been doing it forever. So why not make that mountain the symbol of this rivalry?" The Wolf Pack and Bulldogs have played each other 55 times. The series began in 1923 and has been played every season since 1998. The 55 match ups are more games than Nevada has played UNLV (49 times) or Boise State (45 times), two of its other main rivals. Fresno State is one of Nevada's two protected Mountain West Conference rivalries (along with UNLV) when the conference shifts to one division in 2023, meaning they will play every year. Fresno State leads the all-time series 32-22-1 as of 2023, including a 16–11 mark since the teams began playing regularly again in 1994.

=== San Jose State ===
The Sagebrushers/Wolf Pack and Spartans have met up over 35 times on the gridiron and Nevada leads the rivalry series 23-11-2 as of 2022. The Wolf Pack won the rivalry's first game, 6–0 in Reno, Nevada on Thanksgiving Day 1899. Bob Brule scored the game's only touchdown and fell into the water of an irrigation ditch behind the end zone, followed by three Cal State Normal School (San Jose State) Spartan players. The two schools did not play from 1901 to 1930 and again from 1949 to 1991. The Wolf Pack was 2-4-2 against San Jose State after the first eight games in the rivalry but has gone 21-6-0 since 1941.

The 2 schools main campuses are approximately 250 miles apart, and have played in the same conferences since 1992, 1st in the Big West Conference, in the 1990s, then in the 2000s the Spartans and Wolf Pack were both a part of WAC, Western Athletic Conference, and are division rivals in the Mountain West today.

Both schools are also the oldest public higher education institutions in their respective states of California and Nevada. San Jose State University was founded in 1857 while the University of Nevada, Reno was founded in 1874.

=== UC Davis ===
The Aggie-Pack Battle

UC Davis and Nevada have not played each other since 2013, but have a historical rivalry dating back to the first match up in 1915 when the University Farm School Aggies beat the Nevada Sagebrushers 14–0 in Carson City, Nevada. They have played each other 54 times since. The "Aggie-Pack" battle would regularly have old-fashioned rooters buses travel 146 miles (2.5 hours) down I-80 for this rivalry that was regularly "a battle for West Coast small-college supremacy ... in fact, the mid-November 1977 Nevada-UCD matchup drew 12,800 fans to Toomey Field, which still stands as a home attendance record ... and yes, the crowd-pleasing Aggies prevailed, 37-21 ..." Nevada leads the series 30-21-3 as of 2024.

== Retired numbers ==
Nevada Wolf Pack retired numbers
No.	Player	Pos.	Tenure	Ref.
27	Frank Hawkins	RB	1977–1980	
41	Marion Motley	FB	1940–1942	

Hawkins was a three-time I-AA All-American, and led Division I-AA in rushing twice. Selected in the tenth round of the 1981 NFL draft by the Oakland Raiders, he played seven seasons with the Raiders and was a member of the 1984 team that won Super Bowl XVIII. He rushed for 5,333 yards at Nevada and also had 11 consecutive games in a season with at least 100 rushing yards per game. He was inducted into the College Football Hall of Fame in 1997.

Motley played three seasons with the Wolf Pack, and has been considered by many as "The Jackie Robinson of Football". Motley was one of four black players to break professional football's color barrier when he signed with the Cleveland Browns in 1946, and helped lead the Browns to four straight All-America Football Conference (AAFC) titles and the 1950 NFL title in their first year in the league. Motley was inducted into the Pro Football Hall of Fame in 1968 and was selected to the NFL 75th Anniversary All-Time Team.

== College Football Hall of Fame ==
Name	Years	Position	Inducted	Ref
Buck Shaw	1925-1928	Head coach	1972	
Frank Hawkins	1977-1980	RB	1997	
Chris Ault	1976-2012	Head coach	2002	

The Wolf Pack have two coaches and one player inducted into the College Football Hall of Fame. The field at Mackay Stadium was named Chris Ault Field in 2013 in appreciation for Chris Ault's numerous accomplishments. While, Buck Shaw Stadium at Santa Clara University is named after famed coach Buck Shaw's numerous accomplishments. Frank Hawkins was a three-time All-American, and led Division I-AA in rushing twice and rushed for 5,333 yards total while at Nevada.

== Pro Football Hall of Fame ==
Inducted	Player	POS	Seasons at Nevada
1968	Marion Motley	FB	1940-1942

Motley was inducted into the Pro Football Hall of Fame in 1968 and was selected to the NFL 75th Anniversary All-Time Team in 1994. Marion Motley has been considered by many as "The Jackie Robinson of Football." Motley was one of four black players to break professional football's color barrier when he signed with the Cleveland Browns in 1946, and helped lead the Browns to four straight AAFC titles and the 1950 NFL title.

== National and Conference Awards ==
- Eddie Robinson Award

Eddie Robinson Award
Year	Name	Position
1991	Chris Ault	Coach

The Eddie Robinson Award is awarded annually to college football's top head coach in the NCAA Division I Football Championship Subdivision (formerly Division I-AA). It was established in 1987.

- National Football Foundation Scholar-Athlete of the Year Award

NFF Scholar-Athlete of the Year Award
Year	Name	Position
2015	James Dobrich	LB

=== All-Americans ===
Nevada has had 1- Consensus 1st Team All-American, in program history as of the end of the 2022 season.

Name	Year	Position	Team	Ref
James Bradshaw	1919	QB	1st	
James Bradshaw	1921	HB	2nd	
Buster McClure	1944	DT	AP-3rd/ UP-4th	
Buster McClure	1945	DT	AP-3rd	
Stan Heath	1948	QB	UPI-1st/ CP-2nd/ TSN-2nd	
Matt Clafton	1991	LB	Consensus 1st	
Stefphon Jefferson	2012	RB	WCFF-2nd/ AP-3rd/ CFN-3rd	

== Coaches and notable players ==
=== Head coaches ===
Nevada has had 28 head coaches, and 1 interim head coach, since it began play during the 1896 season. Since December 2023, Jeff Choate has served as Nevada's head coach.

=== Notable former players ===
Player	Pos.	Career
Colin Kaepernick	QB	2007–2011
Frank Hawkins	RB	1977–1980
Marion Motley	FB	1940–1942
Nate Burleson	WR	1999–2002
Virgil Green	TE	2008–2010
Joel Bitonio	OL	2009–2013
Austin Corbett	OL	2013–2017
Brandon Marshall	LB	2007–2011
Malik Reed	LB	2015–2018
Eric Beavers	QB	1983-1986

== Notable games ==
Nevada 0, California 0 on November 3, 1923: A game that will always be remembered in Nevada football history was the improbable scoreless tie against California in 1923. Cal entered the game in the midst of a 50-game undefeated streak, three consecutive national championships, three consecutive conference championships, and two consecutive Rose Bowl appearances in 1920, and 1921 that ended in a victory and a tie respectively. The team was so dominant it was known as the "Wonder Team". The fact that the Wolf Pack, a much smaller program from a lower division, held powerhouse Cal scoreless in Berkeley makes this final score one of the most interesting in college football history. Cal would go on to finish the season with a 9–0–1 record, and would claim 1923 as their 4th consecutive national championship. The tie was the only regular season game for California that did not end in a victory in the four-year time frame.

Nevada 23, UNLV 14 on September 16, 1978: Nevada had not beaten UNLV in four straight tries, and was a 20-point underdog with the game being played in Las Vegas in 1978. Nevada would outplay the Rebels however, and go on to win 23–14. The story that came after the game is what makes the victory remembered by Wolf Pack alumni and fans. Chris Ault convinced the airport security to let the team disassemble the Fremont Cannon so that the team could bring it back to Reno on the plane. Nevada running back Frank Hawkins carried the barrel of the cannon onto the plane. Chris Ault would tell this story during the week of the UNLV game to get his players fired up.

Nevada 59, Boise State 52 (F/3OT) on December 8, 1990: Nevada and Boise State met for the second time in 1990 for the semi-final of the 1990 NCAA Division I-AA National Championship. Nevada had lost to Boise State earlier that year in a conference game 30–14. The Wolf Pack would play 3 overtimes periods for the second playoff game in a row, and would win 59–52 after running back Ray Whalen scored a touchdown. Nevada would go on to lose to Georgia Southern in the National Championship game the following week. This is still the only postseason game ever played between these two schools.

Nevada 55, Weber State 49 on November 2, 1991: Nevada recorded the largest come from behind victory in Division 1 NCAA history when it beat Weber State 55–49 in 1991. Nevada was down by 35 points at halftime when QB Fred Gatlin was replaced by Chris Vargas. Nevada would go on the score at will and only allow one touchdown by Weber State the entire second half. Nevada would go on to win the 1991 Big Sky Championship. Michigan State tied the record 35 point comeback when they beat Northwestern in 2006, and became the first school to do so in the FBS subdivision.

Nevada 48, Utah State 47 on November 14, 1992: Nevada would beat Utah State after a late 4th quarter comeback. Nevada was losing by 23 points with just over 5 minutes left when QB Chris Vargas would lead them to a one-point, 48–47 victory. The win clinched the Big West Conference title for Nevada in their first season after joining Division I-A. Nevada was the first program to win a conference title during their first year in the FBS (Division I-A), after entering the subdivision from a lower subdivision.

Nevada 18, Ball State 15 on December 18, 1996: Nevada and Ball State were expected to bring offensive fireworks for the 1996 Las Vegas Bowl. What ensued however was a hard nosed defensive display from both sides. After Nevada scored a touchdown on their opening possession, offenses found it a lot tougher to get points on the board. Nevada's starting QB John Dutton was substituted for proven backup Eric Bennett to try to spark the offense. Nevada LB Mike Crawford became the game's MVP with 14 tackles, a forced fumble, and a game sealing interception late in the 4th quarter. With the play of Crawford, plus the energy Bennett was able to give the offense off the bench in the second half, Nevada was able to win their first bowl game in 48 years.

Nevada 38, Fresno State 35 on November 26, 2005: Fresno State was ranked number 16 in the nation, and just came off a narrow defeat at the hands of the eventual National Champion USC Trojans. Nevada would take and early lead that it would only relinquish for a very short time in the 3rd quarter. Nevada QB Jeff Rowe passed for a touchdown, and ran for another while passing for 189 yards. Back-up running back Robert Hubbard would have a standout game as he rushed for 146 yards on 16 carries, with 3 rushing touchdowns, and a 16-yard catch. Nevada would recover a late Fresno State on-sides kick attempt to seal the 38–35 victory, and Nevada's first WAC Championship. This was also Nevada's first conference championship in 8 years.

Nevada 34, Boise State 31 (F/OT) on November 26, 2010 "Blue Friday": No. 19 ranked Nevada faced No. 3 AP (No. 4 BCS) ranked Boise State in Reno, a matchup hyped as the biggest sporting event in Reno for the last 100 years. Boise State had the nation's longest winning streak at 24 games, and were trying to jump Oregon in the BCS poll to have a shot at the national title with a win against Nevada. At the start of the second half, Nevada was trailing 24–7, but mounted a comeback when Nevada senior quarterback Colin Kaepernick scored an 18-yard rushing touchdown in the 3rd quarter, cutting the margin to 24–14. In the fourth quarter, the Wolf Pack scored a rushing touchdown when receiver Rishard Matthews broke through the defense on a reverse to cut the deficit to three at 24–21. On the next Wolf Pack possession, Nevada kicker Anthony Martinez tied the game 24–24 with a 23-yard field goal. Boise State answered with a quick touchdown, when Kellen Moore hit Doug Martin on a screen for a 79-yard touchdown pass to go up 31–24. With 4:53 remaining in the game, Kaepernick led the Wolf Pack on a 14-play drive, capping off with a touchdown pass to Rishard Matthews to tie the game at 31–31 with 13 seconds remaining. BSU's Moore then completed a Hail Mary pass downfield to the Nevada 9-yard line with 2 seconds left, but Bronco kicker Kyle Brotzman missed a 26-yard field goal as time expired in regulation. In overtime, Brotzman missed a 29-yard field goal during the Broncos' turn on offense during the first overtime. When Nevada got its turn on offense, Anthony Martinez kicked a 34-yard field goal to give Nevada the biggest win in the history of the program, and knocking Boise State out of BCS title and Rose Bowl contention. Nevada would go on to win a share of the 2010 WAC title 8 days later after beating Louisiana Tech 35–17.

Nevada 20, Boston College 13 on January 9, 2011: After beating No. 3 Boise State and Louisiana Tech to claim a share of the WAC title, Nevada entered the Kraft Fight Hunger Bowl ranked No. 15 nationally. Defenses dominated most of the game, as even Nevada's high-powered offense only scored one touchdown, on a 27-yard pass from Colin Kaepernick to a wide open Rishard Matthews in the first quarter. The last touchdown of the game was a 72-yard punt return by Matthews later in that first quarter. Both teams scored two field goals each to finish off the game, as Nevada won by seven points. This was Nevada's first, and still only bowl victory against a power 5 conference school, and ended the season ranked No. 11, their highest ranking to date playing in the modern FBS/I-AA subdivision. Matthews was named the game's offensive MVP.

== Future non-conference opponents ==
Announced schedules as of February 18, 2026.

2026	2027	2028	2029	2030
Western Kentucky	Troy	at Utah	at Nebraska	at Ohio State
Montana State	Idaho State	at SMU	Utah State	
at UCLA	at USC		at Kansas	
at Middle Tennessee	at Utah State			
