= 2011 Kraft Fight Hunger Bowl (January) =

Nevada Wolf Pack	Boston College Eagles
(12–1)	(7–5)
WAC	ACC
20	13
Head coach: Chris Ault	Head coach: Frank Spaziani
AP / Coaches / BCS; 13 / 15 / 15
	1	2	3	4	Total
Nevada	14	3	3	0	20
Boston College	7	0	3	3	13
- Date: January 9, 2011
- Season: 2010
- Stadium: AT&T Park
- Location: San Francisco, California
- MVP: Rishard Matthews (WR Nevada); Luke Kuechly (LB Boston College)
- Favorite: Nevada by 9
- Referee: Mike Defee (Big 12)
- Attendance: 41,063
- Payout: US$750,000-825,000

United States TV coverage
- Network: ESPN
- Announcers: Mark Jones, Bob Davie, Rod Gilmore and Quint Kessenich

The 2011 Kraft Fight Hunger Bowl game was the 9th edition of the annual college football bowl game known previously as the Emerald Bowl. It was played after the 2010 NCAA Division I FBS football season at AT&T Park in San Francisco, California on January 9, 2011 (6 p.m. PT) between the Nevada Wolf Pack and the Boston College Eagles. ESPN television broadcast the game with Kraft as the title sponsor.

This marked the first time in the bowl's history that the game was not played in December; the game was played the night before the BCS National Championship Game.

Scoring two touchdowns in the first quarter by Rishard Matthews, the Nevada Wolf Pack defeated Boston College 20–13 for the bowl title.

== Teams ==
Team selections were made on "Selection Sunday" in early December. The game was supposed to feature a team from the WAC against a team from the Pac-10 Conference. The bowl would have had the sixth choice of Pac-10 teams, but a Pac-10 team was not available, as only four teams from the conference were bowl-eligible, so organizers of the game went to a contingency plan with the ACC to supply a team.

Representing the WAC were the Nevada Wolf Pack and representing the ACC were the Boston College Eagles.

=== Nevada Wolf Pack ===
During the regular season, Nevada scored 75 school record touchdowns for 554 total points, another record. Wolf Pack senior RB Vai Taua, rushing at 127.8 yards per game, was sixth in the nation. Senior QB Colin Kaepernick was the only player in college football history to pass for over 9,000 yards [9,906] and rush for over 4,000 yards [4,090]. Defensively, senior DE Dontay Moch was fifth in the nation in tackles for loss with 1.69 per game and the nation's active leader in career TFL with 63.0.

=== Boston College Eagles ===
The Eagles led the nation in rushing defense allowing just 80.2 yards per game and held seven opponents under 100 yards rushing, including a low of four yards twice this season. Sophomore LB Luke Kuechly led the nation in tackles with 14.3 per game. Offensively, the team was led by junior RB Montel Harris, who is 11th in the nation in rushing with 103.6 yards per game.

== Game summary ==
=== Scoring summary ===
Scoring play	Score
1st quarter
BC – Andre Williams 30-yard run (Nate Freese kick), 8:30	BC 7–0
NEV – Rishard Matthews 27-yard pass from Colin Kaepernick (Anthony Martinez kick), 3:40	TIE 7–7
NEV – Matthews 72-yard punt return (Martinez kick), 2:27	NEV 14–7
2nd quarter
NEV – Martinez 32-yard field goal, 5:48	NEV 17–7
3rd quarter
BC – Freese 22-yard field goal, 11:08	NEV 17–10
NEV – Martinez 27-yard field goal, 1:17	NEV 20–10
4th quarter
BC – Freese 32-yard field goal, 3:52	NEV 20–13

=== Statistics ===
Statistics	Nevada	Boston College
First downs	16	12
Total offense, plays – yards	73–306	59–185
Rushes-yards (net)	40–114	25–64
Passing yards (net)	192	121
Passes, Comp-Att-Int	20–33–1	14–34–2
Time of possession	34:46	25:14

== Game notes ==
- An Oreo cookie, with chocolate on one side and vanilla on the other, was used for the opening toss, instead of a coin.
- The longest road trip: Boston College in the San Francisco bowl and Stanford in the Orange Bowl in Miami, both close to 3,100 miles – nearly a 46-hour drive.
