= Chris Ault =

American athletic director, football coach and former player

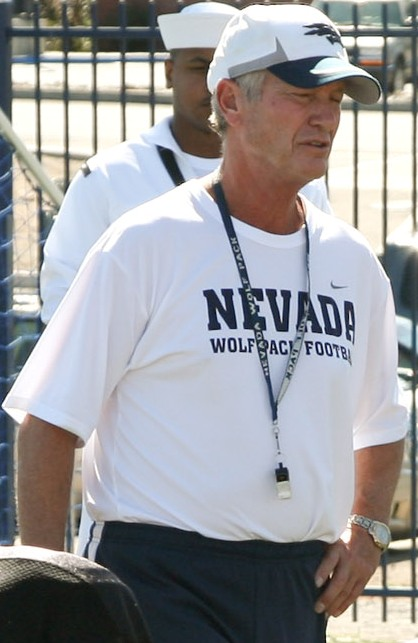
- Ault in 2009

Biographical details
- Born: November 8, 1946 (age 79); San Bernardino, California, U.S.

Playing career
- 1965–1968: Nevada
- Position: Quarterback

Coaching career (HC unless noted)
- 1968: Churchill County HS (NV) (assistant)
- 1969–1971: Bishop Manogue HS (NV)
- 1972: Reno HS (NV)
- 1973–1975: UNLV (assistant)
- 1976–1992: Nevada
- 1994–1995: Nevada
- 2004–2012: Nevada
- 2016–2017: Rhinos Milano

Administrative career (AD unless noted)
- 1986–2004: Nevada
- 2013–2015: Kansas City Chiefs (consultant)

Head coaching record
- Overall: 234–108–1 (college) (Note: In 1985, UNLV was forced to forfeit all 7 wins from the 1983 season and all 11 wins from the 1984 season, including their victory in the California Bowl. Ault and his team were given a win and the Fremont Cannon as a result. See Wikipedia:WikiProject College football/Vacated victories for an explanation of how vacated victories are recorded.)
- Bowls: 2–8
- Tournaments: 9–7 (NCAA D-I-AA playoffs)

Accomplishments and honors

Championships
- 4 Big Sky (1983, 1986, 1990–1991); 3 Big West (1992, 1994–1995); 2 WAC (2005, 2010); Italian Football League Champion (2016)

Awards
- Eddie Robinson Coach of the Year (1991); 4× Big Sky Coach of the Year (1983, 1986, 1990–1991); 2× WAC Coach of the Year (2005, 2010)
- College Football Hall of Fame; Inducted in 2002 (profile)

Christopher Thomas Ault (born November 8, 1946) is an American former football player, coach, and college athletics administrator. He served three stints at the head football coach at the University of Nevada, Reno (1976–1992, 1994–1995 and 2004–2012), leading the Nevada Wolf Pack to a record of 234–108–1 over 28 seasons and guiding the program from the NCAA's Division II to Division I-AA in 1978 and then to Division I-A in 1992. Ault was also the athletic director at Nevada from 1986 to 2004. He was the school's starting quarterback from 1965 to 1968. He is a former consultant for the Kansas City Chiefs of the National Football League (NFL). Ault was inducted into the College Football Hall of Fame as a coach in 2002, seven years after his first retirement from coaching in 1995. He also coached in the Italian Football League. He recently served as a member of the Nevada Athletic Commission, overseeing all boxing and UFC fights in the state. Chris Ault is currently on the College Football Playoff Selection Committee.

== Coaching career ==
After the 2004 season, Ault fired head coach Chris Tormey. He named himself as the replacement three days later, with the approval of school president John Lilley and the Nevada Board of Regents. A member of the university's faculty senate expressed concern at the perceived conflict of interest, especially because the salary of head football coach exceeded that of athletic director.

Ault is credited as the creator of the "Pistol Offense", which he instituted at Nevada in 2004. Since becoming the primary offense for Nevada, the Pistol has been used by other schools across the country. The San Francisco 49ers began employing the pistol offense with the emergence of former Nevada quarterback Colin Kaepernick. Since installing the Pistol, Nevada has won shares of two WAC titles—in 2005 (with Boise State) and 2010 (with Boise State and Hawaii).

Ault won his 200th college football game October 9, 2009 when his Wolf Pack beat Louisiana Tech, 37–14.

On December 28, 2012, Ault announced his retirement, effective at the end of the year. In an emotional press conference, Ault said the time had come to pass the program to a new coach. He had spent 41 years―all but seven years of his adult life―at Nevada as a player, coach or administrator.

=== Italian Football League ===
On September 17, 2015, Rhinos Milano announced Ault as new head coach for the 2016 season. On July 9, 2016, he won the Italian Football League Italian Bowl Championship after an undefeated season and a 13 games win streak. Ault led the Rhinos to the Italian Bowl championship game again in 2017 but this time lost to Seamen Milano, 37–29.

== Education and family ==
Ault graduated from St. Catherine's Academy in Anaheim, California, graduated from University of Nevada, Reno with a bachelor's degree in education in 1968 and went on to complete an M.B.A. in 1971. He is married to Kathy Ault and has three children: Lisa, Chris Jr., and Amy. His daughter, Lisa, is married to American baseball coach, John Savage. His grandson, Jack, is a staff member of the Jim Rome radio show.

== Head coaching record ==
=== College ===
Year	Team	Overall	Conference	Standing	Bowl/playoffs	Coaches^{#}	AP/NCAA^{°}
Nevada Wolf Pack (NCAA Division II independent) (1976–1977)
1976	Nevada	8–3					
1977	Nevada	8–3					7
Nevada Wolf Pack (NCAA Division I-AA independent) (1978)
1978	Nevada	11–1			L NCAA Division I-AA Semifinal		1
Nevada Wolf Pack (Big Sky Conference) (1979–1991)
1979	Nevada	8–4	5–2	2nd	L NCAA Division I-AA Semifinal		5
1980	Nevada	6–4–1	4–3	T–2nd			
1981	Nevada	7–4	4–3	T–4th			
1982	Nevada	6–5	3–4	T–5th			
1983	Nevada	10–4	6–1	1st	L NCAA Division I-AA Semifinal		11
1984	Nevada	7–4	5–2	2nd			
1985	Nevada	11–2	6–1	2nd	L NCAA Division I-AA Quarterfinal		2
1986	Nevada	13–1	7–0	1st	L NCAA Division I-AA Semifinal		1
1987	Nevada	5–6	4–4	T–4th			
1988	Nevada	7–4	4–4	T–4th			
1989	Nevada	7–4	5–3	T–3rd			19
1990	Nevada	13–2	7–1	1st	L NCAA Division I-AA Championship		4
1991	Nevada	12–1	8–0	1st	L NCAA Division I-AA Quarterfinal		1
Nevada Wolf Pack (Big West Conference) (1992)
1992	Nevada	7–5	5–1	1st	L Las Vegas		
Nevada Wolf Pack (Big West Conference) (1994–1995)
1994	Nevada	9–2	6–1	T–1st			
1995	Nevada	9–3	7–0	1st	L Las Vegas		
Nevada Wolf Pack (Western Athletic Conference) (2004–2011)
2004	Nevada	5–7	3–5	T–6th			
2005	Nevada	9–3	7–1	T–1st	W Hawaii		
2006	Nevada	8–5	5–3	T–3rd	L MPC Computers		
2007	Nevada	6–7	4–4	T–4th	L New Mexico		
2008	Nevada	7–6	5–3	T–2nd	L Humanitarian		
2009	Nevada	8–5	7–1	2nd	L Hawaii		
2010	Nevada	13–1	7–1	T–1st	W Kraft Fight Hunger	13	11
2011	Nevada	7–6	5–2	T–2nd	L Hawaii		
Nevada Wolf Pack (Mountain West Conference) (2012)
2012	Nevada	7–6	4–4	5th	L New Mexico		
Nevada:		234–108–1	133–53				
Total:		234–108–1					
National championship Conference title Conference division title or championship game berth
^{#}Rankings from final Coaches Poll.; ^{°}Rankings from final AP Poll.

== See also ==
- List of college football career coaching wins leaders
- List of college football head coaches with non-consecutive tenure
