= Virgil Green =

American football player (born 1988)

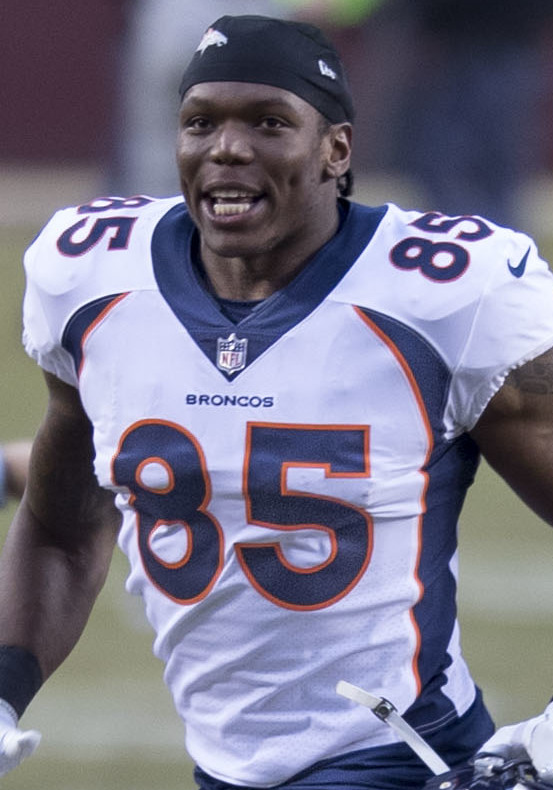
- Green with the Denver Broncos in 2017

Nevada Wolf Pack
- Title: Tight ends coach

Personal information
- Born: August 3, 1988 (age 38); Tulare, California, U.S.
- Listed height: 6 ft 5 in (1.96 m)
- Listed weight: 255 lb (116 kg)

Career information
- High school: Tulare Union
- College: Nevada (2006–2010)
- NFL draft: 2011: 7th round, 204th overall pick

Career history

Playing
- Denver Broncos (2011–2017); Los Angeles Chargers (2018–2020)

Coaching
- Nevada (2023–present) Tight ends coach

Operations
- Nevada (2022) Director of player personnel

Awards and highlights
- Super Bowl champion (50)

Career NFL statistics
- Receptions: 102
- Receiving yards: 1,145
- Receiving touchdowns: 7
- Stats at Pro Football Reference

Virgil Leo Green (born August 3, 1988) is an American college football coach and former professional tight end. He is the tight ends coach for the University of Nevada, Reno, a position he has held since 2023. He played college football at Nevada and was selected by the Denver Broncos in the seventh round of the 2011 NFL draft.

== Early life ==
Green is a graduate of Tulare Union High School, where he played on the Redskins football team. He totaled 61 receptions for 1,014 yards (16.6 avg.) with 12 touchdowns during his career at Tulare, where he earned first-team All-East Yosemite League honors following his senior season. He had 13 catches for 245 yards and four touchdowns in a single game. In addition to football, he lettered four years in basketball and participated in track & field.

== College career ==
Green played 50 career games (34 starts) at the University of Nevada and totaled 72 receptions for 939 yards (13.0 avg.) with 11 touchdowns while helping the Wolf Pack rank fifth in the nation with 500.2 total yards per game from 2007 to 2010. He recorded a personal-best 35 catches for 515 yards (14.7 avg.) with five touchdowns in his senior campaign to earn first-team All-Western Athletic Conference honors. He was named the Nevada Strength and Conditioning Athlete of the Year as a junior in the 2009 season in addition to being selected to the All-WAC second-team.

=== College statistics ===
Season	Team	Class	GP	Receiving			
Season	Team	Class	GP	Rec	Yds	Avg	TD
2008	Nevada	SO	13	14	164	11.7	1
2009	Nevada	JR	13	23	260	11.3	5
2010	Nevada	SR	14	35	515	14.7	5
Career			40	72	939	11.7	11

== Professional career ==
=== Pre-draft ===
Pre-draft measurables
Height	Weight	Arm length	Hand span	Wingspan	40-yard dash	10-yard split	20-yard split	20-yard shuttle	Three-cone drill	Vertical jump	Broad jump	Bench press
6 ft 3 3/8 in (1.91 m)	249 lb (113 kg)	33 1/2 in (0.85 m)	9 1/4 in (0.23 m)	6 ft 8 1/4 in (2.04 m)	4.64 s	1.62 s	2.72 s	4.40 s	6.90 s	42.5 in (1.08 m)	10 ft 10 in (3.30 m)	23 reps
All values from 2011 NFL Scouting Combine.

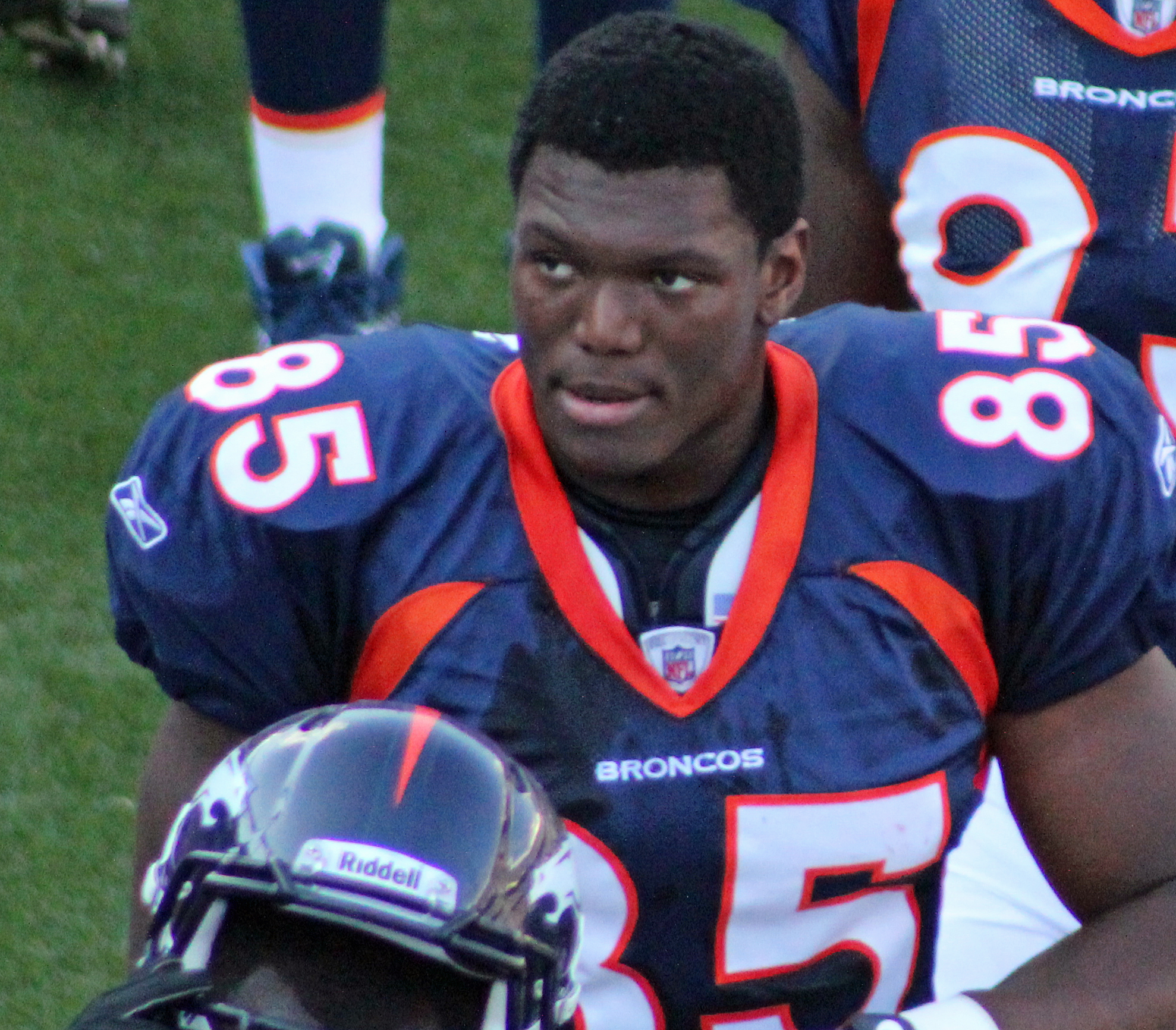
Green with the Broncos in 2011

Green was considered to be a top tight end prospect for the 2011 NFL draft. At the 2011 NFL Combine, he was the top tight end performer in the broad jump and vertical jump categories.

=== Denver Broncos ===
Green was chosen in the seventh round with the 204th overall pick in the 2011 NFL draft by the Denver Broncos. As a rookie, Green had a limited role behind the main starter Daniel Fells and Julius Thomas. He started three games and recorded three receptions for 24 yards on the 2011 season.

In March 2012, Green was suspended for four games after failing a drug test. Green then began taking prescribed medication for ADHD before receiving approval from the NFL. He remained in a limited role on the offense behind Joel Dreessen and Jacob Tamme. He recorded two starts and five receptions for 63 yards.

In the 2013 season, Green started three games and recorded nine receptions for 45 yards.

On December 28, 2014, Green scored his first career touchdown reception, which was from quarterback Brock Osweiler, in a 47–14 win against the Oakland Raiders in Week 17. On the 2014 season, he finished with six receptions for 74 yards and one touchdown on nine starts.

On March 10, 2015, the Broncos re-signed Green to a three-year, $8.4 million contract. In Week 2, against the Kansas City Chiefs, he scored a one-yard touchdown from Peyton Manning on Thursday Night Football. On the 2015 season, he started five games and finished with 12 receptions for 173 yards and one receiving touchdown.

On February 7, 2016, Green played on the Broncos team that won Super Bowl 50. In that Super Bowl, the Broncos defeated the Carolina Panthers by a score of 24–10.

In the 2016 season, Green started 11 games and finished with 22 receptions for 237 yards and one receiving touchdown.

On September 17, 2017, in Week 2 against the Dallas Cowboys, Green had two receptions for 11 yards and a touchdown in the 42–17 victory. In the 2017 season, he started all 16 games and finished with 14 receptions for 191 yards and one receiving touchdown.

=== Los Angeles Chargers ===
On March 14, 2018, Green signed a three-year, $8.6 million contract. The deal includes a $2.4 million signing bonus and $5.9 million guaranteed with the Los Angeles Chargers. In Week 5, against the Oakland Raiders, he scored his first receiving touchdown as a Charger. In the 2018 season, he finished with 19 receptions for 210 receiving yards and one receiving touchdown. In the Divisional Round of the AFC Playoffs, Green caught a one-yard receiving touchdown in the 41–28 loss to the New England Patriots.

In the 2019 season, Green finished with nine receptions for 78 receiving yards and one receiving touchdown.

In Week 7 of the 2020 season against the Jacksonville Jaguars, Green suffered an ankle injury while catching a 26-yard touchdown pass and was placed on injured reserve on October 29, 2020. He finished the 2020 season with three receptions for 50 yards and one touchdown in six games.

=== Professional statistics ===
Year	Tm	G	Tgt	Rec	Yds	Y/R	TD
2011	DEN	15	5	3	24	8.0	0
2012	DEN	12	6	5	63	12.6	0
2013	DEN	16	12	9	45	5.0	0
2014	DEN	13	6	6	74	12.3	1
2015	DEN	16	15	12	173	14.4	1
2016	DEN	12	37	22	237	10.8	1
2017	DEN	16	22	14	191	13.6	1
2018	LAC	16	27	19	210	11.1	1
2019	LAC	15	13	9	78	8.7	1
2020	LAC	6	6	3	50	16.7	1
Career		137	149	102	1,145	11.2	7

== Post-playing career ==
Green was named the director of player personnel at his alma mater Nevada in 2022. He was promoted to tight ends coach on August 28, 2023.
