= Justin Veltung =

American football player (born 1991)

No. 19
- Position: Wide receiver

Personal information
- Born: September 6, 1991 (age 35); Puyallup, Washington
- Listed height: 5 ft 11 in (1.80 m)
- Listed weight: 182 lb (83 kg)

Career information
- High school: Puyallup
- College: Idaho
- NFL draft: 2013: undrafted

Career history
- Seattle Seahawks (2013)*; St. Louis Rams (2013–2014); Winnipeg Blue Bombers (2015)
- * Offseason or practice squad member only
- Stats at Pro Football Reference

Justin Veltung (born March 30, 1991) is an American former professional football player who was a wide receiver in the National Football League (NFL) and Canadian Football League (CFL). He played college football for the Idaho Vandals before signing with the Seattle Seahawks as an undrafted free agent in 2013. He has also played for the St. Louis Rams.He currently resides in Lugoff-Elgin South Carolina

== High school ==
As a senior, was first-team all-South Puget Sound League as a receiver, defensive back and kick returner. Named SPSL Special Teams Player of the Year as a junior and senior and Tacoma News Tribune all-area return specialist. Had 19 receptions for 481 yards and 944 all-purpose yards despite missing part of the season with injury.

== College career ==
=== 2009 ===
Saw action as a true freshman at receiver (one reception for seven yards) and on special teams where he returned 17 kicks for 425 yards.

=== 2010 ===
Developed into an integral member of the Vandal receiving corps. Was third on the team in total receiving yards (497) and tied for sixth in total receptions (25) and scored more TDs than any other Vandal receiver with eight. Also was the Vandals’ leading kick returner with 686 yards on 30 returns.

=== 2011 ===
Was named to the preseason Paul Hornung Watch list. Battled foot injury throughout the season, but nevertheless, led the team in punt and kickoff returns and was the fifth leading receiver and was second in all-purpose yards with 919.

=== 2012 ===
Was once again named to the preseason Paul Hornung Watch List, but was once again hampered by injury his final season, catching only 16 passes for a measly 166 yards. He returned eight kickoffs for 138 yards and 15 punts for 32 yards.

== Professional career ==
=== Seattle Seahawks ===
On May 23, 2013, Veltung was signed by his hometown Seattle Seahawks. He was released on July 28, 2013 when the Seahawks signed Ray Holley.

=== St. Louis Rams ===
He was signed three days later, on July 31, 2013 by the St. Louis Rams. He was waived during final cuts on August 29, 2013. After he cleared waivers he was signed to the Rams practice squad. Justin had a partial tear to his right meniscus. He underwent a successful surgery in Oct 2015 and is currently rehabbing in his hometown of Puyallup, WA.
