= Rishard Matthews =

American football player (born 1989)

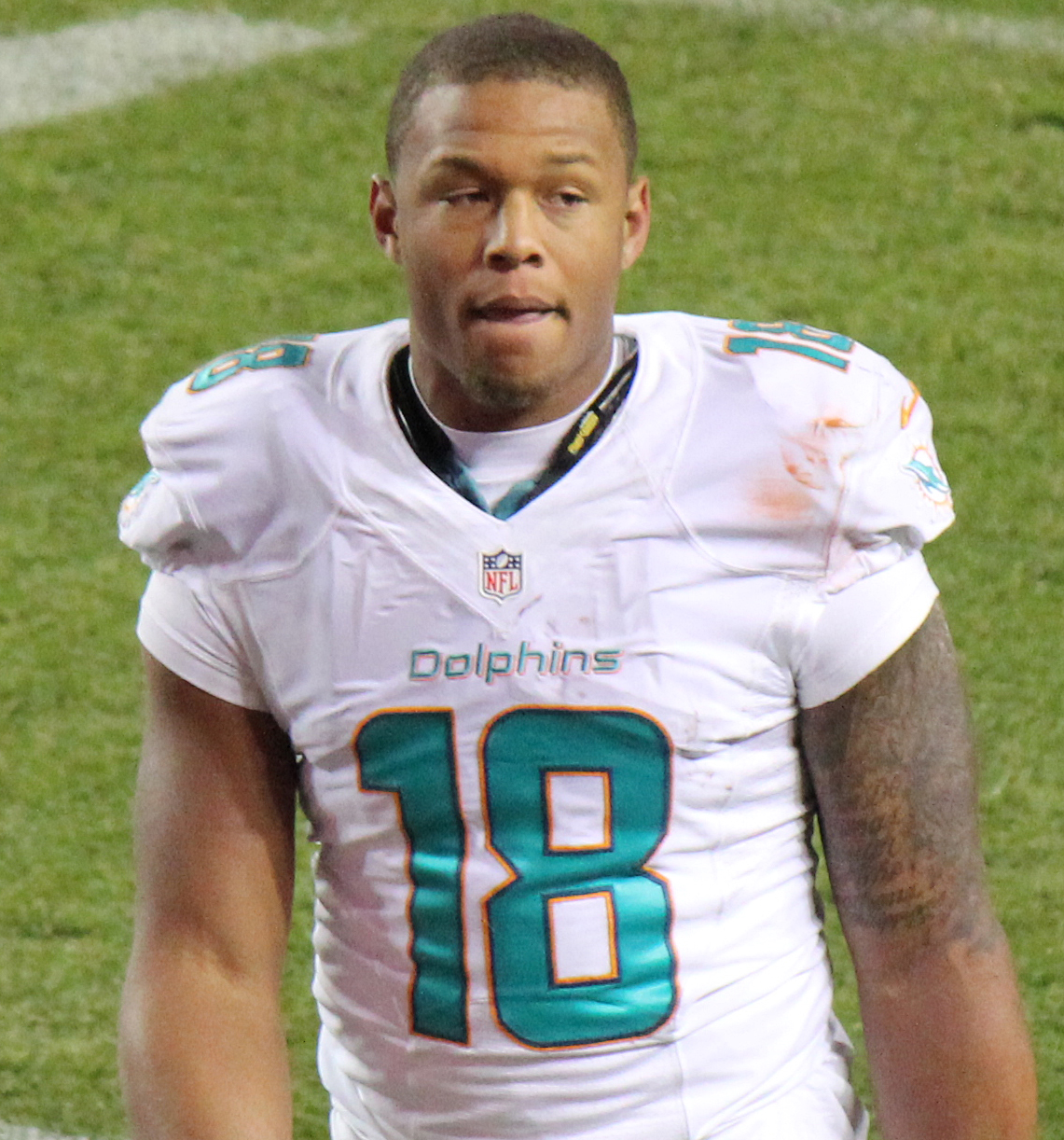
- Matthews with the Miami Dolphins in 2014

No. 86, 18, 82
- Position: Wide receiver

Personal information
- Born: October 12, 1989 (age 37); San Diego, California, U.S.
- Listed height: 6 ft 0 in (1.83 m)
- Listed weight: 217 lb (98 kg)

Career information
- High school: Saddleback (Santa Ana)
- College: Bakersfield (2008–2009); Nevada (2010–2011)
- NFL draft: 2012: 7th round, 227th overall pick

Career history
- Miami Dolphins (2012–2015); Tennessee Titans (2016–2018); New York Jets (2018); New Orleans Saints (2019)*
- * Offseason or practice squad member only

Awards and highlights
- First-team All-WAC (2011)

Career NFL statistics
- Receptions: 230
- Receiving yards: 3,160
- Receiving touchdowns: 21
- Stats at Pro Football Reference

Rishard Andre Matthews (born October 12, 1989) is an American former professional football player who was a wide receiver in the National Football League (NFL). He played college football for the Nevada Wolf Pack and was selected by the Miami Dolphins in the seventh round of the 2012 NFL draft. Matthews was also a member of the Tennessee Titans, New York Jets, and New Orleans Saints.

== Early life ==
Matthews was born on October 12, 1989 in San Diego, California. He attended Saddleback High School and lettered for the basketball team, averaging 9.8 points, 6.8 rebounds, 2.6 assists, 0.3 blocks and 2.3 steals. Matthews also played for the football team.

== College career ==
Matthews initially signed a letter of intent committing to the University of Oregon. He attended Bakersfield College before transferring to the University of Nevada, Reno. In his two years at Nevada, the first catching passes from Colin Kaepernick, Matthews had 147 receptions for 2,243 yards and 13 touchdowns. While at Nevada, he was named second-team all-WAC as a wide receiver.

== Professional career ==
Pre-draft measurables
Height	Weight	Arm length	Hand span	40-yard dash	10-yard split	20-yard split	20-yard shuttle	Three-cone drill	Vertical jump	Broad jump	Bench press
6 ft 0 3/8 in (1.84 m)	217 lb (98 kg)	32 1/2 in (0.83 m)	9 1/8 in (0.23 m)	4.44 s	1.56 s	2.59 s	4.19 s	6.88 s	36.0 in (0.91 m)	10 ft 3 in (3.12 m)	20 reps
All values from NFL Combine/Pro Day

=== Miami Dolphins ===
Matthews was selected by the Miami Dolphins in the seventh round (227th overall) of the 2012 NFL draft. He recorded his first reception in a 19–14 loss to the Buffalo Bills on November 15. He finished the Thursday Night Football game with one catch for 19 yards. Overall, Matthews finished his rookie season with 11 receptions for 151 yards.

Matthews was one of only four receivers to make the final 53-man roster in 2013. This was crucial after seeing Dustin Keller go down in a preseason game against the Houston Texans. Matthews was a second-year player adding to the likes of Mike Wallace, Brian Hartline, and Brandon Gibson. Matthews had his first two-touchdown game in another losing effort against the Tampa Bay Buccaneers on November 11, 2013. He finished the Monday Night Football game with 120 yards on 11 receptions. After Miami's Brandon Gibson went down in Week 11, Matthews received a large increase in targets and a number of starts. Matthews proved to be a reliable target, specifically in the Miami win against the New England Patriots on December 15, 2013. Matthews caught a 24-yard reception to keep the drive alive in the 24–20 upset. The 2013 season came to an end with Matthews contributing 41 receptions for 448 yards and two touchdowns.

The 2014 campaign was a lackluster performance for Matthews, who had emerged in 2013 as a reliable target, with the season ending prematurely for Matthews when off-field conduct resulted in his suspension for the final game against the New York Jets. While Matthews had shown promise, he finished the 2014 season with 12 receptions for 135 yards and two touchdowns.

In Week 7 of the 2015 season against the Houston Texans, Matthews reeled in a then career-long 53-yard receiving touchdown in the first quarter of the 44–26 victory. On November 30, 2015, Matthews suffered multiple fractured ribs in the Miami Dolphins' Week 12 loss to the New York Jets. On January 2, 2016, Matthews was placed on injured reserve. Overall, in the 2015 season, he finished with 43 receptions for 662 yards and four touchdowns.

=== Tennessee Titans ===
On March 9, 2016, Matthews signed a three-year deal with the Tennessee Titans. In his first season with the Titans, he set a career-high in receiving yards with 945 and with nine receiving touchdowns. He led the Titans in both receiving yards and touchdowns.

On September 24, 2017, Matthews scored a 55-yard touchdown during the Titans' 33–27 victory against the Seattle Seahawks. On November 16, he scored a 75-yard touchdown as the Titans lost to the Pittsburgh Steelers by a score of 40–17. Overall, he finished the 2017 season with 53 receptions for 795 yards and four touchdowns.

On August 21, 2018, Matthews signed a one-year contract extension with the Titans through the 2019 season. However, on September 26, he requested his release from the Titans, citing a lack of playing time and targets. The team granted his request the next day and released him. Matthews finished with his time with the Titans with a total of 121 receptions for 1,751 yards and 13 touchdowns.

=== New York Jets ===
On October 23, 2018, Matthews signed with the New York Jets. He played in five games recording just two catches for 13 yards before being placed on injured reserve on December 18.

=== New Orleans Saints ===
On June 13, 2019, Matthews signed with the New Orleans Saints. On August 10, he was released after leaving camp.

=== Retirement ===
On August 12, 2019, Matthews announced his retirement from the NFL.

== NFL career statistics ==
=== Regular season ===
Year	Team	Games		Receiving					Rushing					Fumbles	
Year	Team	GP	GS	Rec	Yds	Avg	Lng	TD	Att	Yds	Avg	Lng	TD	Fum	Lost
2012	MIA	8	1	11	151	13.7	30	0	—	—	—	—	—	0	0
2013	MIA	16	5	41	448	10.9	29	2	—	—	—	—	—	0	0
2014	MIA	14	0	12	135	11.3	23	2	1	3	3.0	3	0	1	0
2015	MIA	11	11	43	662	15.4	53T	4	1	4	4.0	4	0	0	0
2016	TEN	16	9	65	945	14.5	60	9	—	—	—	—	—	1	1
2017	TEN	14	11	53	795	15.0	75T	4	1	-3	-3.0	-3	0	0	0
2018	TEN	3	0	3	11	3.3	4	0	—	—	—	—	—	0	0
2018	NYJ	5	0	2	13	6.5	7	0	—	—	—	—	—	0	0
Career		87	38	230	3,160	13.8	75T	21	3	4	1.3	4	0	2	1

=== Postseason ===
Year	Team	Games		Receiving					Rushing					Fumbles	
Year	Team	GP	GS	Rec	Yds	Avg	Lng	TD	Att	Yds	Avg	Lng	TD	Fum	Lost
2017	TEN	2	2	4	42	10.5	15	0	—	—	—	—	—	0	0
Career		2	2	4	42	10.5	15	0	0	0	0.0	0	0	0	0

== Personal life ==
Matthews' father, Andre, and half-brother, Christopher Ruiz, served in the Marines. Ruiz was killed in a plane crash in 2015 while working as a private defense contractor in Afghanistan.
