= 2010 Mountain West Conference football season =

- League: NCAA Division I Football Bowl Subdivision
- Sport: Football
- Duration: September 2, 2010 through January 10, 2011
- Teams: 9
- TV partner(s): Mtn., CBS College Sports, Versus

2011 NFL Draft
- Top draft pick: QB Andy Dalton, TCU
- Picked by: Cincinnati Bengals, 35th overall

Regular Season

Football seasons
- 2009 2011

2010 Mountain West Conference football standings
	Conf.			Overall
Team	W		L	W		L
No. 2 TCU $	8	–	0	13	–	0
Utah	7	–	1	10	–	3
Air Force	5	–	3	9	–	4
San Diego State	5	–	3	9	–	4
BYU	5	–	3	7	–	6
Colorado State	2	–	6	3	–	9
UNLV	2	–	6	2	–	11
Wyoming	1	–	7	3	–	9
New Mexico	1	–	7	1	–	11
$ – Conference champion and BCS representative as top non-AQ school to meet automatic qualification criteria; As of January 11, 2011; Rankings from AP Poll

The 2010 Mountain West Conference football season was the 12th since eight former members of the Western Athletic Conference banded together to form the MW.

This was the last season for two of the conference's charter members. Utah left the MW to join the Pac-10 in 2011. At the same time, the Utes' historic rival, BYU, will become a football independent and join the West Coast Conference in other sports. In the 2011 season, Boise State joined from the WAC, while three other WAC members, Fresno State, Hawaiʻi and Nevada, have accepted invitations to join the MW in 2012. For more details on these developments, see 2010 NCAA conference realignment.

== Rankings ==
Ranking movement Legend: ██ Increase in ranking. ██ Decrease in ranking. ██ Not ranked the previous week.
		Pre	Wk 1	Wk 2	Wk 3	Wk 4	Wk 5	Wk 6	Wk 7	Wk 8	Wk 9	Wk 10	Wk 11	Wk 12	Wk 13	Wk 14	Final
Air Force	AP			(28)	(26)	(29)	25	23	(37)						(33)	(35)	(35)
Air Force	C		(T52)	(29)	(33)	(29)	(27)	23	(33)	(39)			(40)		(33)		(33)
Air Force	Harris	Not released						23	(31)			(39)	(39)	(36)	(37)	(37)	
Air Force	BCS	Not released															
BYU	AP	(34)	(33)														(38)
BYU	C	(28)	24	(37)													
BYU	Harris	Not released															
BYU	BCS	Not released															
Colorado State	AP																
Colorado State	C																
Colorado State	Harris	Not released															
Colorado State	BCS	Not released															
New Mexico	AP																
New Mexico	C																
New Mexico	Harris	Not released															
New Mexico	BCS	Not released															
San Diego State	AP									(31)	(33)	(27)	(30)		(32)	(33)	(28)
San Diego State	C									(34)	(34)	(27)	(31)	(35)	(30)	(30)	(28)
San Diego State	Harris	Not released								(36)	(33)	(26)	(31)	(38)	(34)	(35)	
San Diego State	BCS	Not released															
TCU	AP	6	4	4	4	5	5	4	4	4	4	3	4	4	3	3	2
TCU	C	7	5	5	5	5	5	5	4	4	4	3	4	4	3	3	2
TCU	Harris	Not released						4	3	4	4	3	4	4	3	3	
TCU	BCS	Not released							5	4	3	3	3	3	3	3	
UNLV	AP																
UNLV	C																
UNLV	Harris	Not released															
UNLV	BCS	Not released															
Utah	AP	(28)	20	14	13	13	10	11	9	8	6	15	25	23	21	20	(26)
Utah	C	24	20	14	13	12	10	10	9	7	6	15	24	22	21	19	23
Utah	Harris	Not released						10	9	7	6	15	21	20	21	19	
Utah	BCS	Not released							9	8	5	14	23	20	20	19	
Wyoming	AP																
Wyoming	C																
Wyoming	Harris	Not released															
Wyoming	BCS	Not released															

== Mountain West vs. BCS matchups ==
Date	Visitor	Home	Notes
September 2	Pittsburgh 24	Utah 27	Utah won its first season opener against a team ranked in the AP Poll when the Utes defeated the #15 ranked Panthers.
September 4^	Colorado State 3	Colorado 24	Rocky Mountain Showdown. Played at Invesco Field at Mile High in Denver.
September 4	New Mexico 0	Oregon 72	The Lobos surrendered 720 yards of offense, a new record for the Ducks.
September 4	Washington 17	BYU 23	
September 4^	TCU 30	Oregon State 21	Played at Cowboys Stadium; Andy Dalton got his 30th win as a starter to overtake Sammy Baugh for first place among TCU quarterbacks.
September 4	Wisconsin 41	UNLV 21	UNLV fell to 2–9 all time against Big Ten Conference teams.
September 11	Wyoming 7	Texas 34	Wyoming lost its 12th straight game against teams from the Big 12 Conference, a streak dating back to 1997.
September 11	Texas Tech 52	New Mexico 17	
September 18	Air Force 24	Oklahoma 27	Air Force gained 458 yards of offense compared to Oklahoma's 367.
September 18	BYU 10	Florida State 34	The Seminoles held BYU to 39 yards of offense during the second half.
September 18	Baylor 10	TCU 45	Andy Dalton completed his first 11 passes and completed 21 out of 23 for 267 yards and two touchdowns.
September 18	San Diego State 24	Missouri 27	T.J. Moe scored on a 68-yard pass from Blaine Gabbert with 51 seconds left to give Missouri a 27–24 win.
October 9	UNLV 10	West Virginia 49	West Virginia scored its most points since scoring 66 in 2007 against Connecticut.
October 9	Utah 68	Iowa State 27	Seven different Utes scored touchdowns as Utah got its first win against Iowa State
November 13	Utah 3	Notre Dame 28	Notre Dame ended an 11-game losing streak against ranked teams when they beat the #15 Utes
^Denotes neutral site game

== Schedule ==
=== Week one ===
Date	Time	Visiting team	Home team	Site	TV	Result	Attendance	Ref.
September 2	6:30 p.m.	No. 15 Pittsburgh	Utah	Rice-Eccles Stadium • Salt Lake City	Versus	W 27–24 ^{OT}	45,730	
September 4	12:00 p.m.	Northwestern State	Air Force	Falcon Stadium • Colorado Springs, Colorado		W 65–21	40,236	
September 4	12:00 p.m.	Colorado	Colorado State	Invesco Field at Mile High • Denver (Rocky Mountain Showdown)	the Mtn.	L 3–24	60,989	
September 4	1:30 p.m.	New Mexico	Oregon	Autzen Stadium • Eugene, Oregon	CSN	L 0–72	59,104	
September 4	5:00 p.m.	Washington	BYU	LaVell Edwards Stadium • Provo, Utah	CBS-C	W 23–17	63,771	
September 4	6:00 p.m.	Nicholls State	San Diego State	Qualcomm Stadium • San Diego		W 47–0	25,290	
September 4	5:45 p.m.	No. 24 Oregon State	No. 6 TCU	Cowboys Stadium • Arlington, Texas (Cowboys Classic)	ESPN	W 30–21	46,138	
September 4	7:00 p.m.	Southern Utah	Wyoming	War Memorial Stadium • Laramie, Wyoming		W 28–20	20,043	
September 4	9:00 p.m.	Wisconsin	UNLV	Sam Boyd Stadium • Whitney, Nevada	Versus	L 21–41	31,107	
^{#}Rankings from AP Poll released prior to game. All times are in Mountain Time.

=== Week two ===
Date	Time	Visiting team	Home team	Site	TV	Result	Attendance	Ref.
September 11	2:00 p.m.	BYU	Air Force	Falcon Stadium • Colorado Springs, Colorado	Versus	AFA 35–14	46,692	
September 11	2:00 p.m.	UNLV	No. 20 Utah	Rice-Eccles Stadium • Salt Lake City, Utah	the Mtn.	Utah 38–10	45,102	
September 11	5:00 p.m.	Tennessee Tech	No. 4 TCU	Amon G. Carter Stadium • Fort Worth, Texas		W 62–7	37,117	
September 11	5:00 p.m.	Wyoming	No. 5 Texas	Darrell K Royal–Texas Memorial Stadium • Austin, Texas	Fox Sports Net	L 7–34	101,339	
September 11	6:00 p.m.	Texas Tech	New Mexico	University Stadium • Albuquerque, New Mexico		L 17–52	25,734	
September 11	6:00 p.m.	San Diego State	New Mexico State	Aggie Memorial Stadium • Las Cruces, New Mexico		W 41–21	16,891	
September 11	8:30 p.m.	Colorado State	Nevada	Mackay Stadium • Reno, Nevada	ESPNU	L 6–51	18,098	
^{#}Rankings from AP Poll released prior to game. All times are in Mountain Time.

=== Week three ===
Date	Time	Visiting team	Home team	Site	TV	Result	Attendance	Ref.
September 18	1:30 p.m.	Air Force	No. 7 Oklahoma	Gaylord Family Oklahoma Memorial Stadium • Norman, Oklahoma	Fox Sports Net	L 24–27	84,332	
September 18	1:30 p.m.	BYU	Florida State	Bobby Bowden Field at Doak Campbell Stadium • Tallahassee, Florida	ESPNU	L 10–34	68,795	
September 18	1:30 p.m.	Colorado State	Miami (OH)	Yager Stadium • Oxford, Ohio	ESPN3	L 10–31	16,691	
September 18	2:30 p.m.	Baylor	No. 4 TCU	Amon G. Carter Stadium • Fort Worth, Texas	Versus	W 45–10	47,493	
September 18	5:00 p.m.	San Diego State	Missouri	Faurot Field • Columbia, Missouri	FSN PPV	L 24–27	56,050	
September 18	6:00 p.m.	No. 14 Utah	New Mexico	University Stadium • Albuquerque, New Mexico	the Mtn.	Utah 56–14	23,940	
September 18	6:00 p.m.	No. 3 Boise State	Wyoming	War Memorial Stadium • Laramie, Wyoming	CBS-C	L 6–51	29,014	
September 18	8:30 p.m.	UNLV	Idaho	Kibbie Dome • Moscow, Idaho	ESPNU	L 7–30	15,390	
^{#}Rankings from AP Poll released prior to game. All times are in Mountain Time.

=== Week four ===
Date	Time	Visiting team	Home team	Site	TV	Result	Attendance	Ref.
September 24	6:00 p.m.	No. 4 TCU	SMU	Gerald J. Ford Stadium • University Park, Texas (Battle for the Iron Skillet)	ESPN	W 41–24	35,481	
September 25	12:00 p.m.	Air Force	Wyoming	War Memorial Stadium • Laramie, Wyoming	the Mtn.	AFA 20–14	22,413	
September 25	2:00 p.m.	Idaho	Colorado State	Sonny Lubick Field at Hughes Stadium • Fort Collins, Colorado		W 36–34	23,925	
September 25	4:00 p.m.	Nevada	BYU	LaVell Edwards Stadium • Provo, Utah	the Mtn.	L 13–27	61,471	
September 25	6:00 p.m.	Utah State	San Diego State	Qualcomm Stadium • San Diego		W 41–7	45,682	
September 25†	6:00 p.m.	San Jose State	No. 13 Utah	Rice-Eccles Stadium • Salt Lake City, Utah		W 56–3	45,099	
September 25	8:00 p.m.	New Mexico	UNLV	Sam Boyd Stadium • Whitney, Nevada	the Mtn.	UNLV 45–10	16,961	
^{#}Rankings from AP Poll released prior to game. All times are in Mountain Time.

=== Week five ===
Date	Time	Visiting team	Home team	Site	TV	Result	Attendance	Ref.
October 1	6:00 p.m.	BYU	Utah State	Romney Stadium • Logan, Utah	ESPN	L 16–31	24,152	
October 2	12:00 p.m.	No. 5 TCU	Colorado State	Hughes Stadium • Fort Collins, Colorado	the Mtn.	TCU 27–0	22,553	
October 2	12:30 p.m.	Navy	Air Force	Falcon Stadium • Colorado Springs, Colorado	Versus	W 14–6	47,565	
October 2	4:00 p.m.	UTEP	New Mexico	University Stadium • Albuquerque, New Mexico	the Mtn.	L 20–38	22,511	
October 2	5:00 p.m.	Wyoming	Toledo	Glass Bowl • Toledo, Ohio		W 20–15	20,843	
October 2	8:00 p.m.	No. 25 Nevada	UNLV	Sam Boyd Stadium • Whitney, Nevada (Battle for Nevada)	the Mtn.	L 26–44	28,958	
^{#}Rankings from AP Poll released prior to game. All times are in Mountain Time.

=== Week six ===
Date	Time	Visiting team	Home team	Site	TV	Result	Attendance	Ref.
October 9	12:00 p.m.	Colorado State	No. 25 Air Force	Falcon Stadium • Colorado Springs, Colorado	the Mtn.	AFA 49–27	41,547	
October 9	1:30 p.m.	Wyoming	No. 5 TCU	Amon G. Carter Stadium • Fort Worth, Texas	CBS-C	TCU 45–0	38,081	
October 9	1:30 p.m.	UNLV	West Virginia	Mountaineer Field • Morgantown, West Virginia	ESPN Plus	L 10–49	58,234	
October 9	4:00 p.m.	San Diego State	BYU	LaVell Edwards Stadium • Provo, Utah	the Mtn.	BYU 24–21	62,176	
October 9	5:00 p.m.	No. 10 Utah	Iowa State	Jack Trice Stadium • Ames, Iowa	FCS	W 68–27	43,195	
October 9	6:00 p.m.	New Mexico	New Mexico State	Aggie Memorial Stadium • Las Cruces, New Mexico (Rio Grande Rivalry)		L 14–16	21,437	
^{#}Rankings from AP Poll released prior to game. All times are in Mountain Time.

=== Week seven ===
Date	Time	Visiting team	Home team	Site	TV	Result	Attendance	Ref.
October 16	12:00 p.m.	UNLV	Colorado State	Hughes Stadium • Fort Collins, Colorado	the Mtn.	CSU 43–10	30,753	
October 16	2:00 p.m.	BYU	TCU	Amon G. Carter Stadium • Fort Worth, Texas	Versus	TCU 31–3	40,416	
October 16	4:00 p.m.	Utah	Wyoming	War Memorial Stadium • Laramie, Wyoming	the Mtn.	Utah 30–6	20,014	
October 16	6:00 p.m.	Air Force	San Diego State	Qualcomm Stadium • San Diego	CBS-C	SDSU 27–25	28,178	
^{#}Rankings from AP Poll released prior to game. All times are in Mountain Time.

=== Week eight ===
Date	Time	Visiting team	Home team	Site	TV	Result	Attendance	Ref.
October 23	12:00 p.m.	Wyoming	BYU	LaVell Edwards Stadium • Provo, Utah	the Mtn.	BYU 25–20	60,505	
October 23	4:00 p.m.	Utah	Colorado State	Rice–Eccles Stadium • Salt Lake City, Utah	the Mtn.	Utah 59–6	45,029	
October 23	6:00 p.m.	Air Force	TCU	Amon G. Carter Stadium • Fort Worth, Texas	CBS-C	TCU 38–7	46,096	
October 23	8:00 p.m.	San Diego State	New Mexico	University Stadium • Albuquerque, New Mexico	the Mtn.	SDSU 30–20	16,488	
^{#}Rankings from AP Poll released prior to game. All times are in Mountain Time.

=== Week nine ===
Date	Time	Visiting team	Home team	Site	TV	Result	Attendance	Ref.
October 30	12:00 p.m.	San Diego State	Wyoming	War Memorial Stadium • Laramie, Wyoming	the Mtn.	SDSU 48–38	16,252	
October 30	4:00 p.m.	New Mexico	Colorado State	Hughes Stadium • Fort Collins, Colorado	the Mtn.	CSU 38–14	18,266	
October 30	5:30 p.m.	Utah	Air Force	Falcon Stadium • Colorado Springs, Colorado	CBS-C	Utah 28–23	37,211	
October 30	9:00 p.m.	TCU	UNLV	Sam Boyd Stadium • Whitney, Nevada	CBS-C	TCU 48–6	16,745	
^{#}Rankings from AP Poll released prior to game. All times are in Mountain Time.

=== Week ten ===
Date	Time	Visiting team	Home team	Site	TV	Result	Attendance	Ref.
November 6	10:00 a.m.	Air Force	Army	Michie Stadium • West Point, New York	CBS-C	W 42–22	38,128	
November 6	11:00 a.m.	UNLV	BYU	LaVell Edwards Stadium • Provo, Utah	the Mtn.	BYU 55–7	61,283	
November 6	1:30 p.m.	TCU	Utah	Rice-Eccles Stadium • Salt Lake City, Utah	CBS-C	TCU 47–7	46,522	
November 6	4:00 p.m.	Wyoming	New Mexico	University Stadium • Albuquerque, New Mexico	the Mtn.	NM 34–31	18,017	
November 6	6:00 p.m.	Colorado State	San Diego State	Qualcomm Stadium • San Diego	the Mtn.	SDSU 24–19	34,689	
^{#}Rankings from AP Poll released prior to game. All times are in Mountain Time.

=== Week eleven ===
Date	Time	Visiting team	Home team	Site	TV	Result	Attendance	Ref.
November 13	12:00 p.m.	BYU	Colorado State	Sonny Lubick Field at Hughes Stadium • Fort Collins, Colorado	the Mtn.	BYU 49–10	16,501	
November 13	12:30 p.m.	Utah	Notre Dame	Notre Dame Stadium • Notre Dame, Indiana	NBC	L 3–28	80,795	
November 13	3:00 p.m.	San Diego State	TCU	Amon G. Stadium • Fort Worth, Texas	Versus	TCU 40–35	45,694	
November 13	4:00 p.m.	New Mexico	Air Force	Falcon Stadium • Colorado Springs, Colorado	the Mtn.	AFA 48–23	27,309	
November 13	7:00 p.m.	Wyoming	UNLV	Sam Boyd Stadium • Whitney, Nevada	the Mtn.	UNLV 42–16	16,111	
^{#}Rankings from AP Poll released prior to game. All times are in Mountain Time.

=== Week twelve ===
Date	Time	Visiting team	Home team	Site	TV	Result	Attendance	Ref.
November 18	8:00 p.m.	Air Force	UNLV	Sam Boyd Stadium • Whitney, Nevada	CBC-C	AFA 35–20	13,790	
November 20	12:00 p.m.	Colorado State	Wyoming	War Memorial Stadium • Laramie, Wyoming (The Border War)	the Mtn.	Wyo 44–0	17,011	
November 20	4:00 p.m.	New Mexico	BYU	LaVell Edwards Stadium • Provo, Utah	the Mtn.	BYU 40–7	59,077	
November 20	8:00 p.m.	Utah	San Diego State	Qualcomm Stadium • San Diego	the Mtn.	Utah 38–34	34,951	
^{#}Rankings from AP Poll released prior to game. All times are in Mountain Time.

=== Week thirteen ===
Date	Time	Visiting team	Home team	Site	TV	Result	Attendance	Ref.
November 27	1:30 p.m.	BYU	Utah	Rice–Eccles Stadium • Salt Lake City, Utah (Holy War)	the Mtn.	Utah 17–16	45,272	
November 27	2:00 p.m.	TCU	New Mexico	University Stadium • Albuquerque, New Mexico	Versus	TCU 66–17	18,640	
November 27	4:00 p.m.	UNLV	San Diego State	Qualcomm Stadium • San Diego	the Mtn.	SDSU 48–14	22,091	
^{#}Rankings from AP Poll released prior to game. All times are in Mountain Time.

=== Week fourteen ===
Date	Time	Visiting team	Home team	Site	TV	Result	Attendance	Ref.
December 4	8:30 p.m.	UNLV	No. 25 Hawai'i	Aloha Stadium • Honolulu, HI		L 21–59	37,820	
^{#}Rankings from AP Poll released prior to game. All times are in Mountain Time.

== Statistics ==
Team

- Scoring offense: TCU (520 points, 43.3 average)
- Scoring defense: TCU (137 points, 11.4 average)
- Rushing offense: Air Force (317.9 yards per game)
- Rushing defense: TCU (89.2 yards per game)
- Pass offense: San Diego State (297.0 yards per game)
- Total offense: TCU (491.5 yards per game)

== Bowl games ==
Mountain West teams finished 4–1 in bowl games in 2011, the best record out of all conferences to win the Bowl Challenge Cup for the second consecutive year.

Bowl Game	Date	Stadium	City	Television	Team Matchups	Winning team	Score	Losing team	Score
New Mexico Bowl	December 18	University Stadium	Albuquerque, New Mexico	ESPN	BYU vs. UTEP	BYU	52	UTEP	24
Maaco Bowl Las Vegas	December 22	Sam Boyd Stadium	Whitney, Nevada	ESPN	Utah vs. Boise State	Boise State	26	Utah	3
Poinsettia Bowl	December 23	Qualcomm Stadium	San Diego	ESPN	San Diego State vs. Navy	San Diego State	35	Navy	14
Independence Bowl	December 27	Independence Stadium	Shreveport, Louisiana	ESPN2	Air Force vs. Georgia Tech	Air Force	14	Georgia Tech	7
Rose Bowl	January 1	Rose Bowl	Pasadena, California	ESPN	TCU vs. Wisconsin	TCU	21	Wisconsin	19

== Home attendance ==
Team	Game 1	Game 2	Game 3	Game 4	Game 5	Game 6	Total	Average
Air Force	40,236	46,692	47,565	41,547	37,211	27,309	240,560	40,093
BYU	63,771	61,471	62,176	60,505	61,283	59,077	368,283	61,380
Colorado State	23,925	22,553	30,753	18,266	16,501	—	111,998	22,399
New Mexico	25,734	23,940	22,511	16,488	18,017	18,640	125,330	20,888
San Diego State	25,290	45,682	28,178	34,689	34,951	22,091	190,881	31,814
TCU	37,117	47,493	38,081	40,416	46,096	45,694	254,897	42,483
UNLV	31,107	16,961	28,958	16,745	16,111	13,790	123,672	20,612
Utah	45,730	45,102	45,099	45,029	46,522	45,272	272,754	45,459
Wyoming	20,043	29,014	22,413	20,014	16,252	17,011	124,747	20,791

== Awards and honors ==
=== All Conference teams ===
- Offensive Player of the Year: Andy Dalton, SR., QB, TCU
- Defensive Player of the Year: Tank Carder, JR., LB, TCU
- Special Teams Player of the Year: Jeremy Kerley, SR., KR/PR, TCU
- Freshman of the Year: Ronnie Hillman, RB, San Diego State
- Coach of the Year: Brady Hoke, San Diego State

Offense:

Pos.	Name	Yr.	School	Name	Yr.	School
First Team				Second Team		
QB	Andy Dalton	SR.	TCU	Ryan Lindley	JR.	San Diego State
WR	Vincent Brown	SR.	San Diego State	Jeremy Kerley	SR.	TCU
WR	DeMarco Sampson	SR.	San Diego State	Jereme Brooks	SR.	Utah
RB	Ronnie Hillman	FR.	San Diego State	Asher Clark	JR.	Air Force
RB	Ed Wesley	SO.	TCU	JJ Di Luigi	JR.	BYU
TE	Lucas Reed	SO.	New Mexico	Gavin Escobar	FR.	San Diego State
OL	Matt Reynolds	JR.	BYU	A. J. Wallerstein	JR.	Air Force
OL	Marcus Cannon	SR.	TCU	Chase Darden	SR.	Air Force
OL	Jake Kirkpatrick	SR.	TCU	Paul Madsen	JR.	Colorado State
OL	Caleb Schlauderaff	SR.	Utah	Trask Iosefa	SR.	San Diego State
OL	Zane Taylor	SR.	Utah	Tony Bergstrom	JR.	Utah
PK	Joe Phillips	SR.	Utah	Abel Perez	JR.	San Diego State
PR/KR	Jeremy Kerley	SR.	TCU	Shaky Smithson	SR.	Utah

Defense:

Pos.	Name	Yr.	School	Name	Yr.	School
First Team				Second Team		
DL	Vic So'oto	SR.	BYU	Rick Ricketts	SR.	Air Force
DL	Guy Miller	SR.	Colorado State	Cory Grant	SR.	TCU
DL	Wayne Daniels	SR.	TCU	Stansly Maponga	FR.	TCU
DL	Christian Cox	SR.	Utah	Josh Biezuns	JR.	Wyoming
LB	Miles Burris	JR.	San Diego State	Mychal Sisson	JR.	Colorado State
LB	Tanner Brock	SO.	TCU	Carmen Messina	SO.	New Mexico
LB	Tank Carder	JR.	TCU	Chaz Walker	JR.	Utah
DB	Reggie Rembert	SR.	Air Force	Colin Jones	SR.	TCU
DB	Andrew Rich	SR.	BYU	Jason Teague	SR.	TCU
DB	Leon McFadden	SO.	San Diego State	Brandon Burton	JR.	Utah
DB	Tejay Johnson	SR.	Utah	Chris Prosinski	SR.	Wyoming
P	Brian Stahovich	JR.	San Diego State	Pete Kontodiakos	SO.	Colorado State
