= 2010 Western Athletic Conference football season =

2010 WAC football season
- League: NCAA Division I Football Bowl Subdivision
- Sport: Football
- Duration: September 2, 2010 through January 9, 2011
- Teams: 9
- TV partner(s): ABC, ESPN, WAC Sports Network

2011 NFL Draft
- Top draft pick: QB Colin Kaepernick, Nevada
- Picked by: San Francisco 49ers, 36th overall

Regular Season
- Champions: Boise State, Hawaiʻi, & Nevada (co-champions)
- Season MVP: QB Colin Kaepernick, Nevada; QB Kellen Moore, Boise State; DE Chris Carter, Fresno State

Football seasons
- 2009 2011

2010 Western Athletic Conference football standings
	Conf.			Overall
Team	W		L	W		L
No. 11 Nevada +	7	–	1	13	–	1
No. 9 Boise State +	7	–	1	12	–	1
Hawaii +	7	–	1	10	–	4
Fresno State	5	–	3	8	–	5
Louisiana Tech	4	–	4	5	–	7
Idaho	3	–	5	6	–	7
Utah State	2	–	6	4	–	8
New Mexico State	1	–	7	2	–	10
San Jose State	0	–	8	1	–	12
+ – Conference co-champions; Rankings from AP Poll

The 2010 Western Athletic Conference (WAC) football season was an NCAA football season played from September 2, 2010 – January 9, 2011. The Western Athletic Conference in 2010 consisted of 9 members: Boise State, Fresno State, Hawaiʻi, Idaho, Louisiana Tech, Nevada, New Mexico State, San Jose State, and Utah State.

Boise State, Hawaiʻi, and Nevada all went 7–1 in conference play to share the WAC title. All three teams finished the regular season ranked in the top 25 of all four major polls. Boise State (12–1) was invited to the Maaco Bowl Las Vegas where they defeated Utah 26–3. Hawaiʻi (10–4) was invited to the Hawaiʻi Bowl where they lost to Tulsa 35–62. Nevada (13–1) was invited to the Kraft Fight Hunger Bowl where they defeated Boston College 20–13. The only other WAC team to be bowl eligible was Fresno State (8–5), and they were invited to the Humanitarian Bowl where they lost to Northern Illinois 17–40.

This was Boise State's final season as a WAC member. Amid a realignment of NCAA conferences, the school announced on June 11, 2010 that it would leave the WAC for the Mountain West Conference effective July 1, 2011.

== Spring ball ==
Team	Start of Practice	Spring Game
Boise State	March 8	April 17
Fresno State	March 15	April 16
Hawai'i	April 1	April 30
Idaho	March 23	April 23
Louisiana Tech	March 17	April 10
New Mexico State	April 5	May 1
Nevada	March 5	April 3
San Jose State	March 12	April 22
Utah State	March 23	April 24

== Preseason ==
=== WAC media days ===
During the WAC's football preview on July 26 in Salt Lake City, Boise State was selected by both the coaches and media as favorites to win the conference. They received 42 of a possible 43 first place votes in the media poll with Nevada coming in second and receiving the other first place vote. The Broncos received eight of nine first place votes in the coaches poll, but Boise State head coach Chris Petersen was not allowed to vote for his own team in first place, thus the Broncos received all 8 possible first place votes.

Boise State quarterback Kellen Moore was selected as the preseason offensive player of the year and Nevada defensive end Dontay Moch was selected as the preseason defensive player of the year. Moore and Moch were the 2009 WAC players of the year.

==== Media poll ====
1. Boise State – 386 (42)
2. Nevada – 333 (1)
3. Fresno State – 300
4. Idaho – 207
5. Louisiana Tech – 200
6. Utah State – 196
7. Hawai'i – 166
8. New Mexico State – 81
9. San Jose State – 66

==== Coaches poll ====
1. Boise State – 64 (8)
2. Nevada – 55 (1)
3. Fresno State – 50
4. Utah State – 37
5. Hawai'i – 36
6. Idaho – 33
7. Louisiana Tech – 26
8. New Mexico State – 14
9. San Jose State – 9

== WAC vs. BCS matchups ==
WAC teams finished the season 5–9 against teams from BCS conferences. Boise State and Fresno State defeated two each with Nevada gaining the other win.

Date	Visitor	Home	Notes	Winning team
September 2	USC	Hawaiʻi		USC
September 4	Cincinnati	Fresno State		Fresno State
September 4	San Jose State	No. 1 Alabama		Alabama
September 4	Utah State	No. 8 Oklahoma		Oklahoma
September 6	No. 5 Boise State	No. 6 Virginia Tech	Played at FedExField in Landover, Maryland	Boise State
September 11	Idaho	No. 7 Nebraska		Nebraska
September 11	Louisiana Tech	Texas A&M		Texas A&M
September 11	San Jose State	No. 11 Wisconsin		Wisconsin
September 17	No. 24 California	Nevada		Nevada
September 18	Hawaiʻi	Colorado		Colorado
September 25	Oregon State	No. 3 Boise State	ESPN's College GameDay broadcast from Bronco Stadium	Boise State
September 25	Fresno State	Mississippi		Mississippi
September 25	New Mexico State	Kansas		Kansas
December 3	Illinois	Fresno State		Fresno State

== Regular season ==
Index to colors and formatting
WAC member won
WAC member lost
WAC teams in **bold**

The WAC has teams in 4 different time zones. Times reflect start time in respective time zone of each team (Central-Louisiana Tech, Mountain-New Mexico State, Boise State, Utah State, Pacific-Idaho, Fresno State, San Jose State, Nevada, Hawaiian-Hawaiʻi). Conference games start times are that of the home team.

Rankings reflect that of the USA Today Coaches poll for that week until week eight when the BCS poll will be used.

=== Week one ===
Date	Time	Visiting team	Home team	Site	TV	Result	Attendance
September 2	5:00 pm	USC	**Hawaiʻi**	Aloha Stadium • Honolulu, HI	ESPN	**L** 36–49	44,204
September 2	6:00 pm	North Dakota	**Idaho**	Kibbie Dome • Moscow, Idaho	Altitude	**W** 45–0	11,466
September 2	6:00 pm	Eastern Washington	**Nevada**	Mackay Stadium • Reno, Nevada		**W** 49–24	16,313
September 4	4:00 pm	**San Jose State**	No. 1 Alabama	Bryant–Denny Stadium • Tuscaloosa, Alabama		**L** 3–48	101,821
September 4	5:00 pm	**Utah State**	No. 8 Oklahoma	Oklahoma Memorial Stadium • Norman, Oklahoma	FSN	**L** 24–31	85,151
September 4	6:00 pm	Grambling State	**Louisiana Tech**	Independence Stadium • Shreveport, Louisiana (Port City Classic)		**W** 20–6	34,762
September 4	7:00 pm	Cincinnati	**Fresno State**	Bulldog Stadium • Fresno, California	ESPN2	**W** 28–14	37,238
September 6	6:00 pm	No. 5 **Boise State**	No. 6 Virginia Tech	FedExField • Landover, Maryland (Allstate Kickoff in the Capital)	ESPN/ESPN 3D	**W** 33–30	86,587

Players of the week:

Offensive		Defensive		Special teams	
Player	Team	Player	Team	Player	Team
Kellen Moore	Boise State	Logan Harrell	Fresno State	Kyle Brotzman	Boise State

=== Week two ===
Date	Time	Visiting team	Home team	Site	TV	Result	Attendance
September 11	7:00 am	**Hawaiʻi**	Army	Michie Stadium • West Point, New York	CBSCS	**W** 31–28	30,042
September 11	9:30 am	**Idaho**	No. 7 Nebraska	Memorial Stadium • Lincoln, Nebraska	FSN	**L** 17–38	85,732
September 11	11:00 am	**San Jose State**	No. 11 Wisconsin	Camp Randall Stadium • Madison, Wisconsin	ESPN	**L** 14–27	78,469
September 11	6:00 pm	**Louisiana Tech**	Texas A&M	Kyle Field • College Station, Texas		**L** 16–48	77,579
September 11	6:00 pm	San Diego State	**New Mexico State**	Aggie Memorial Stadium • Las Cruces, New Mexico	Altitude	**L** 21–41	16,891
September 11	6:00 pm	Idaho State	**Utah State**	Romney Stadium • Logan, Utah		**W** 38–17	18,347
September 11	7:30 pm	Colorado State	**Nevada**	Mackay Stadium • Reno, Nevada	ESPNU	**W** 51–6	18,098

Players of the week:

Offensive		Defensive		Special teams	
Player	Team	Player	Team	Player	Team
Bryant Moniz	Hawaiʻi	James-Michael Johnson	Nevada	Anthony Martinez	Nevada

=== Week three ===
Date	Time	Visiting team	Home team	Site	TV	Result	Attendance
September 17	7:00 pm	No. 24 California	**Nevada**	Mackay Stadium • Reno, Nevada	ESPN2	**W** 52–31	28,809
September 18	9:30 am	**Hawaiʻi**	Colorado	Folsom Field • Boulder, Colorado	FCS	**L** 13–31	47,840
September 18	5:00 pm	Southern Utah	**San Jose State**	Spartan Stadium • San Jose, California		**W** 16–11	16,739
September 18	6:00 pm	No. 3 **Boise State**	Wyoming	War Memorial Stadium • Laramie, Wyoming	CBSCS	**W** 51–6	29,014
September 18	6:00 pm	Navy	**Louisiana Tech**	Joe Aillet Stadium • Ruston, Louisiana	ESPN3	**L** 23–37	23,122
September 18	6:00 pm	**Fresno State**	**Utah State**	Romney Stadium • Logan, Utah	WAC Sports Network	**FRES** 41–24	19,059
September 18	7:00 pm	**New Mexico State**	UTEP	Sun Bowl Stadium • El Paso, Texas (The Battle of I-10)		**L** 10–42	39,214
September 18	7:30 pm	UNLV	**Idaho**	Kibbie Dome • Moscow, Idaho	ESPNU	**W** 30–7	15,390

Players of the week:

Offensive		Defensive		Special teams	
Player	Team	Player	Team	Player	Team
Colin Kaepernick	Nevada	Aaron Lavarias	Idaho	Trey Farquhar	Idaho

=== Week four ===
ESPN's College GameDay broadcast from inside Bronco Stadium on the blue turf for the No. 3 Boise State vs Oregon State game. This is the first time that College Gameday was broadcast from a WAC school.

Date	Time	Visiting team	Home team	Site	TV	Result	Attendance
September 25	1:00 pm	**Idaho**	Colorado State	Hughes Stadium • Fort Collins, Colorado		**L** 34–36	23,925
September 25	3:00 pm	**Nevada**	BYU	LaVell Edwards Stadium • Provo, Utah	The Mtn.	**W** 24–13	61,471
September 25	4:30 pm	**Fresno State**	Mississippi	Vaught–Hemingway Stadium • Oxford, Mississippi	CSS	**L** 38–55	55,267
September 25	5:00 pm	**New Mexico State**	Kansas	Memorial Stadium • Lawrence, Kansas	FCS	**L** 16–42	46,719
September 25	5:00 pm	**San Jose State**	No. 13 Utah	Rice-Eccles Stadium • Salt Lake City		**L** 3–56	45,099
September 25	5:30 pm	Charleston Southern	**Hawaiʻi**	Aloha Stadium • Honolulu, HI	Oceanic PPV	**W** 66–7	30,300
September 25	6:00 pm	Oregon State	No. 3 **Boise State**	Bronco Stadium • Boise, Idaho	ABC	**W** 37–24	34,137
September 25	6:00 pm	Southern Mississippi	**Louisiana Tech**	Joe Aillet Stadium • Ruston, Louisiana	ESPN3	**L** 12–13	22,344
September 25	6:00 pm	**Utah State**	San Diego State	Qualcomm Stadium • San Diego		**L** 7–41	45,682

Players of the week:

Offensive		Defensive		Special teams	
Player	Team	Player	Team	Player	Team
Kellen Moore (2)	Boise State	James-Michael Johnson (2)	Nevada	Rufus Porter	La Tech

=== Week five ===
Date	Time	Visiting team	Home team	Site	TV	Result	Attendance
October 1	6:00 pm	BYU	**Utah State**	Romney Stadium • Logan, Utah (Beehive Boot)	ESPN	**W** 31–16	24,152
October 2	11:00 am	**Idaho**	Western Michigan	Waldo Stadium • Kalamazoo, Michigan	WAC Sports Network	**W** 33–13	18,508
October 2	5:00 pm	UC Davis	**San Jose State**	Spartan Stadium • San Jose, California		**L** 13–14	17,844
October 2	5:30 pm	**Louisiana Tech**	**Hawaiʻi**	Aloha Stadium • Honolulu, HI	Oceanic PPV	**HAW** 41–21	29,469
October 2	6:00 pm	No. 3 **Boise State**	**New Mexico State**	Aggie Memorial Stadium • Las Cruces, New Mexico	WAC Sports Network	**BSU** 59–0	19,661
October 2	7:00 pm	Cal Poly	**Fresno State**	Bulldog Stadium • Fresno, California		**W** 38–17	37,069
October 2	7:00 pm	No. 25 **Nevada**	UNLV	Sam Boyd Stadium • Whitney, Nevada (Fremont Cannon)	The Mtn.	**W** 44–26	28,958

Players of the week:

Offensive		Defensive		Special teams	
Player	Team	Player	Team	Player	Team
Kealoha Pilares	Hawaiʻi	Robert Siavii	Idaho	Shawn Plummer	Fresno State

=== Week six ===
Date	Time	Visiting team	Home team	Site	TV	Result	Attendance
October 9	3:00 pm	**Utah State**	**Louisiana Tech**	Joe Aillet Stadium • Ruston, Louisiana	Alt/CST	**LT** 24–6	16,073
October 9	6:00 pm	Toledo	No. 4 **Boise State**	Bronco Stadium • Boise, Idaho	WAC Sports Network	**W** 57–14	33,833
October 9	6:00 pm	New Mexico	**New Mexico State**	Aggie Memorial Stadium • Las Cruces, New Mexico (Rio Grande Rivalry)	ESPN3	**W** 16–14	21,437
October 9	7:00 pm	**Hawaiʻi**	**Fresno State**	Bulldog Stadium • Fresno, California	ESPN3	**HAW** 49–27	38,494
October 9	7:30 pm	**San Jose State**	No. 23 **Nevada**	Mackay Stadium • Reno, Nevada	ESPNU	**NEV** 35–13	20,636

Players of the week:

Offensive		Defensive		Special teams	
Player	Team	Player	Team	Player	Team
Vai Taua	Nevada	Donte Savage	New Mexico State	Tyler Stampler	New Mexico State

=== Week seven ===
Date	Time	Visiting team	Home team	Site	TV	Result	Attendance
October 16	3:00 pm	**Idaho**	**Louisiana Tech**	Joe Aillet Stadium • Ruston, Louisiana	Alt/CST	**LT** 48–35	19,750
October 16	5:00 pm	No. 3 **Boise State**	**San Jose State**	Spartan Stadium • San Jose, California	WAC Sports Network	**BSU** 48–20	20,239
October 16	5:30 pm	No. 21 **Nevada**	**Hawaiʻi**	Aloha Stadium • Honolulu, HI	WAC Sports Network	**HAW** 27–21	42,031
October 16	7:00 pm	**New Mexico State**	**Fresno State**	Bulldog Stadium • Fresno, California	ESPNU	**FRES** 33–10	32,334

Players of the week:

Offensive		Defensive		Special teams	
Player	Team	Player	Team	Player	Team
Ross Jenkins	La Tech	Corey Paredes	Hawaiʻi	Chris Potter	Boise State

=== Week eight ===
Date	Time	Visiting team	Home team	Site	TV	Result	Attendance
October 23	2:00 pm	**New Mexico State**	**Idaho**	Kibbie Dome • Moscow, Idaho	SWX	**IDA** 37–14	13,812
October 23	3:00 pm	**Hawaiʻi**	**Utah State**	Romney Stadium • Logan, Utah	Alt	**HAW** 45–7	17,111
October 23	5:00 pm	**Fresno State**	**San Jose State**	Spartan Stadium • San Jose, California (rivalry)	WAC Sports Network	**FRES** 33–18	11,314

Players of the week:

Offensive		Defensive		Special teams	
Player	Team	Player	Team	Player	Team
Alex Green	Hawaiʻi	Corey Paredes (2)	Hawaiʻi	Kevin Goessling	Fresno State

=== Week nine ===
Date	Time	Visiting team	Home team	Site	TV	Result	Attendance
October 26	6:00 pm	**Louisiana Tech**	No. 3 **Boise State**	Bronco Stadium • Boise, Idaho	ESPN2	**BSU** 49–20	32,026
October 30	5:30 pm	**Idaho**	**Hawaiʻi**	Aloha Stadium • Honolulu, HI	ESPN3	**HAW** 45–10	37,466
October 30	6:00 pm	**San Jose State**	**New Mexico State**	Aggie Memorial Stadium • Las Cruces, New Mexico	Altitude	**NMSU** 29–27	13,117
October 30	7:30	**Utah State**	No. 24 **Nevada**	Mackay Stadium • Reno, Nevada	ESPNU	**NEV** 56–42	11,558

Players of the week:

Offensive		Defensive		Special teams	
Player	Team	Player	Team	Player	Team
Bryant Moniz (2)	Hawaiʻi	Mana Silva	Hawaiʻi	Tyler Stampler (2)	New Mexico State

=== Week ten ===
Date	Time	Visiting team	Home team	Site	TV	Result	Attendance
November 6	1:00 pm	**New Mexico State**	**Utah State**	Romney Stadium • Logan, Utah		**USU** 27–22	14,524
November 6	1:30 pm	**Hawaiʻi**	No. 4 **Boise State**	Bronco Stadium • Boise, Idaho	ESPNU/ESPN 3D	**BSU** 42–7	34,060
November 6	2:00 pm	No. 23 **Nevada**	**Idaho**	Kibbie Dome • Moscow, Idaho	WAC Sports Network	**NEV** 63–17	11,247
November 6	3:00 pm	**Fresno State**	**Louisiana Tech**	Joe Aillet Stadium • Ruston, Louisiana (Battle for the Bone)	WAC Sports Network	**FRES** 40–34	17,057

Players of the week:

Offensive		Defensive		Special teams	
Player	Team	Player	Team	Player	Team
Kellen Moore (3)	Boise State	Bobby Wagner	Utah State	Phillip Livas	La Tech

=== Week eleven ===
Date	Time	Visiting team	Home team	Site	TV	Result	Attendance
November 12	6:00 pm	No. 4 **Boise State**	**Idaho**	Kibbie Dome • Moscow, Idaho (Battle for the Governor's Trophy)	ESPN2/ESPN 3D	**BSU** 52–14	16,453
November 13	5:00 pm	**Utah State**	**San Jose State**	Spartan Stadium • San Jose, California		**USU** 38–34	12,239
November 13	6:00 pm	**Louisiana Tech**	**New Mexico State**	Aggie Memorial Stadium • Las Cruces, New Mexico	Alt 2	**LT** 41–20	12,486
November 13	7:30 pm	No. 21 **Nevada**	**Fresno State**	Bulldogs Stadium • Fresno, California	ESPN	**NEV** 35–34	37,116

Players of the week:

Offensive		Defensive		Special teams	
Player	Team	Player	Team	Player	Team
Colin Kaepernick (2)	Nevada	Javontay Crowe	La Tech	Chris Potter (2)	Boise State

=== Week twelve ===
Date	Time	Visiting team	Home team	Site	TV	Result	Attendance
November 19	7:30 pm	**Fresno State**	No. 4 **Boise State**	Bronco Stadium • Boise, Idaho (Battle for the Milk Can)	ESPN2	**BSU** 51–0	33,454
November 20	1:00 pm	**New Mexico State**	No. 18 **Nevada**	Mackay Stadium • Reno, Nevada		**NEV** 52–6	10,906
November 20	5:30 pm	**San Jose State**	**Hawaiʻi**	Aloha Stadium • Honolulu, HI	ESPN3	**HAW** 41–7	30,011
November 20	12:00 pm	**Idaho**	**Utah State**	Romney Stadium • Logan, Utah		**IDA** 28–6	14,072

Players of the week:

Offensive		Defensive		Special teams	
Player	Team	Player	Team	Player	Team
Bryant Moniz (3)	Hawaiʻi	Aaron Brown	Hawaiʻi	Kyle Brotzman (2)	Boise State

=== Week thirteen ===
Date	Time	Visiting team	Home team	Site	TV	Result	Attendance
November 26	7:15 pm	No. 4 **Boise State**	No. 19 **Nevada**	Mackay Stadium • Reno, Nevada	ESPN	**NEV** 34–31 OT	30,712
November 27	5:00 pm	**Louisiana Tech**	**San Jose State**	Spartan Stadium • San Jose, California		**LT** 45–38	8,467
November 27	6:00 pm	**Hawaiʻi**	**New Mexico State**	Aggie Memorial Stadium • Las Cruces, New Mexico	WAC Sports Network	**HAW** 59–24	11,841
November 27	7:00 pm	**Idaho**	**Fresno State**	Bulldog Stadium • Fresno, California	WAC Sports Network	**FRES** 23–20	25,965

Players of the week:

Offensive		Defensive		Special teams	
Player	Team	Player	Team	Player	Team
Alex Green (2)	Hawaiʻi	Travis Brown	Fresno State	Phillip Livas (2)	La Tech

=== Week fourteen ===
Date	Time	Visiting team	Home team	Site	TV	Result	Attendance
December 3	7:15 pm	Illinois	**Fresno State**	Bulldog Stadium • Fresno, California	ESPN2	**W** 25–23	30,625
December 4	1:00 pm	**Utah State**	No. 11 **Boise State**	Bronco Stadium • Boise, Idaho	WAC Sports Network	**BSU** 50–14	32,101
December 4	2:00 pm	**San Jose State**	**Idaho**	Kibbie Dome • Moscow, Idaho		**IDA** 26–23 OT	8,011
December 4	2:00 pm	No. 17 **Nevada**	**Louisiana Tech**	Joe Aillet Stadium • Ruston, Louisiana	WAC Sports Network	**NEV** 35–17	18,562
December 4	5:30 pm	UNLV	**Hawaiʻi**	Aloha Stadium • Honolulu, HI		**W** 59–21	34,746

Players of the week:

Offensive		Defensive		Special teams	
Player	Team	Player	Team	Player	Team
Bryant Moniz (4)	Hawaiʻi	Dontay Moch	Nevada	Kevin Goessling (2)	Fresno State

== All-WAC Teams ==
=== First Team ===
Offense
QB Kellen Moore–Boise State
QB Colin Kaepernick–Nevada
RB Doug Martin–Boise State
RB Vai Taua–Nevada
WR Austin Pettis–Boise State
WR Titus Young–Boise State
WR Greg Salas–Hawaiʻi
TE Virgil Green–Nevada
OL Thomas Byrd–Boise State
OL Nate Potter–Boise State
OL Kenny Wiggins–Fresno State
OL Rob McGill–Louisiana Tech
OL John Bender–Nevada

Defense
DL Shea McClellin–Boise State
DL Ryan Winterswyk–Boise State
DL Chris Carter–Fresno State
DL Logan Harrell–Fresno State
DL Dontay Moch–Nevada
LB Winston Venable–Boise State
LB Ben Jacobs–Fresno State
LB Corey Paredes–Hawaiʻi
LB Bobby Wagner–Utah State
DB George Iloka–Boise State
DB Jeron Johnson–Boise State
DB Mana Silva–Hawaiʻi
DB Davon House–New Mexico State

Specialists
PK Kevin Goessling–Fresno State
P Bobby Cowan–Idaho
ST Phillip Livas–Louisiana Tech

=== Second Team ===
Offense
QB Bryant Moniz–Hawaiʻi
RB Alex Green–Hawaiʻi
RB Lennon Creer–Louisiana Tech
WR Jamel Hamler–Fresno State
WR Kealoha Pilares–Hawaiʻi
WR Eric Greenwood–Idaho
WR Rishard Matthews–Nevada
TE Daniel Hardy–Idaho
OL Bryce Harris–Fresno State
OL Lupepa Letuli–Hawaiʻi
OL Adrian Thomas–Hawaiʻi
OL Chris Barker–Nevada
OL Ailao Eliapo–San Jose State

Defense
DL Billy Winn–Boise State
DL Kaniela Tuipulotu–Hawaiʻi
DL Aaron Lavarias–Idaho
DL Matt Broha–Louisiana Tech
LB Byron Hout–Boise State
LB Travis Brown–Fresno State
LB Adrien Cole–Louisiana Tech
LB James-Michael Johnson–Nevada
LB Kevin Smigh–San Jose State
DB Brandyn Thompson–Boise State
DB Desia Dunn–Fresno State
DB Shiloh Keo–Idaho
DB Isaiah Frey–Nevada
DB Curtis Marsh Jr.–Utah State

Specialists
PK Scott Enos–Hawaiʻi
P Harrison Waid–San Jose State
ST Taveon Rogers–New Mexico State

=== Players of the year ===
Offense
Kellen Moore–Boise State
Colin Kaepernick–Nevada

Defense
Chris Carter–Fresno State

Freshman
Keith Smith–San Jose State

=== Coach of the year ===
Chris Ault–Nevada

== Rankings ==
During the season Boise State, Hawaiʻi, and Nevada were the only WAC teams to be ranked.

Boise State Legend: ██ Increase in ranking. ██ Decrease in ranking. ██ Not ranked the previous week. ( )= First place votes.
Poll	Pre	Wk 1	Wk 2	Wk 3	Wk 4	Wk 5	Wk 6	Wk 7	Wk 8	Wk 9	Wk 10	Wk 11	Wk 12	Wk 13	Wk 14	Final
AP	3 (1)	3 (8)	3 (1)	3 (1)	3 (1)	4 (1)	3 (8)	2 (15)	2 (11)	2 (7)	4 (7)	3 (9)	3 (10)	9	10	9
Coaches	5	3	3	3	3	4	3 (1)	2 (11)	2 (5)	3 (3)	4 (3)	3 (5)	3 (5)	10	10	7
Harris	Not released						3 (10)	2 (29)	2 (14)	3 (12)	4 (9)	3 (11)	3 (14)	10	10	
BCS	Not released							3	3	4	4	4	4	11	10	

Hawaiʻi Legend: ██ Increase in ranking. ██ Decrease in ranking. ██ Not ranked the previous week. RV=receiving votes.
Poll	Pre	Wk 1	Wk 2	Wk 3	Wk 4	Wk 5	Wk 6	Wk 7	Wk 8	Wk 9	Wk 10	Wk 11	Wk 12	Wk 13	Wk 14	Final
AP								RV	RV	RV			RV	25	24	RV
Coaches								RV	RV	RV	RV	RV	RV	RV	25	RV
Harris	Not released							RV	RV	RV	RV	RV	RV	RV	24	
BCS	Not released														24	

Nevada Legend: ██ Increase in ranking. ██ Decrease in ranking. ██ Not ranked the previous week. RV=receiving votes.
Poll	Pre	Wk 1	Wk 2	Wk 3	Wk 4	Wk 5	Wk 6	Wk 7	Wk 8	Wk 9	Wk 10	Wk 11	Wk 12	Wk 13	Wk 14	Final
AP			RV	RV	25	21	19	RV	RV	25	21	19	19	14	13	11
Coaches	RV	RV	RV	RV	25	23	21	RV	RV	23	21	18	19	17	15	13
Harris	Not released						20	25	24	23	21	18	19	15	14	
BCS	Not released								24	23	21	18	19	17	15	

== Bowl games ==
Bowl	Date	Winner*	Score	Loser*	Score	Location	Time^{+}	Network	Notes
UDrove Humanitarian	Dec. 18, 2010	Northern Illinois	40	**Fresno State**	17	Boise, Idaho	2:30 pm	ESPN	
Maaco Bowl Las Vegas	Dec. 22, 2010	**#10 Boise State**	26	No. 19 Utah	3	Whitney, Nevada	5:00 pm	ESPN	
Sheraton Hawaiʻi Bowl	Dec. 24, 2010	Tulsa	62	**#25 Hawaiʻi**	35	Honolulu	5:00 pm	ESPN	
Kraft Fight Hunger	Jan. 9, 2011	**#15 Nevada**	20	Boston College	13	San Francisco	6:00 pm	ESPN	
*WAC team is **bolded**. ^{+}Time given is Pacific Time Rankings reflect Coaches Poll

== Attendance ==
Team	Stadium (Capacity)	Game 1	Game 2	Game 3	Game 4	Game 5	Game 6	Game 7	Total	Average	% of Capacity
Boise State	Bronco Stadium (33,500)	34,137	33,833	32,026	34,060	33,454	32,101		199,611	33,269	99.3%
Fresno State	Bulldog Stadium (41,031)	37,238	37,069	38,494	32,334	37,116	25,965	30,625	238,841	34,120	83.2%
Hawaiʻi	Aloha Stadium (50,000)	44,204	30,300	29,469	42,031	37,466	30,011	34,746	248,227	35,461	70.9%
Idaho	Kibbie Dome (16,000)	11,466	15,390	13,812	11,247	16,453	8,011		76,379	12,730	79.6%
Louisiana Tech	Joe Aillet Stadium (30,600)	23,122	22,344	16,073	19,750	17,057	18,562		116,908	19,485	63.7%
Nevada	Mackay Stadium (29,993)	16,313	18,098	28,809	20,636	11,558	10,906	30,712	136,032	19,433	64.8%
New Mexico State	Aggie Memorial Stadium (30,343)	16,891	19,661	21,437	13,117	12,486	11,841		95,433	15,906	52.4%
San Jose State	Spartan Stadium (31,218)	16,739	17,844	20,239	11,314	12,239	8,467		86,842	14,474	46.4%
Utah State	Romney Stadium (25,513)	18,347	19,059	24,152	17,111	14,524	14,072		107,265	17,878	70.1%

== Expanded WAC standings ==
**Western Athletic Conference**
	Conf		Overall				
Team	W	L	W	L	PF	PA	STREAK
**T1** No. 13 Nevada	7	1	13	1	574	300	W 7
**T1** No. 10 Boise State	7	1	12	1	586	166	W 2
**T1** No. 24 Hawaiʻi	7	1	10	4	554	357	L 1
**4** Fresno State	5	3	8	5	377	390	L 1
**5** Louisiana Tech	4	4	5	7	321	368	L 1
**6** Idaho	3	5	6	7	346	322	W 1
**7** Utah State	2	6	4	8	264	405	L 2
**8** New Mexico State	1	7	2	10	188	474	L 4
**9** San Jose State	0	8	1	12	209	451	L 10

== NFL draft ==
The following list includes all WAC players who were drafted in the 2011 NFL draft.

Round #	Pick #	NFL team	Player	Position	College
2	36	San Francisco 49ers	Colin Kaepernick	QB	Nevada
2	44	Detroit Lions	Titus Young	WR	Boise State
3	66	Cincinnati Bengals	Dontay Moch	LB	Nevada
3	78	St. Louis Rams	Austin Pettis	WR	Boise State
3	90	Philadelphia Eagles	Curtis Marsh Jr.	CB	Utah State
3	96	Green Bay Packers	Alex Green	RB	Hawaii
4	112	St. Louis Rams	Greg Salas	WR	Hawaii
4	131	Green Bay Packers	Davon House	CB	New Mexico State
5	132	Carolina Panthers	Kealoha Pilares	WR	Hawaii
5	144	Houston Texans	Shiloh Keo	S	Idaho
5	160	Chicago Bears	Nathan Enderle	QB	Idaho
5	162	Pittsburgh Steelers	Chris Carter	LB	Fresno State
7	204	Denver Broncos	Virgil Green	TE	Nevada
7	210	Atlanta Falcons	Andrew Jackson	G	Fresno State
7	213	Washington Redskins	Brandyn Thompson	CB	Boise State
7	238	Tampa Bay Buccaneers	Daniel Hardy	TE	Idaho
