= Tejay Johnson =

American football player (born c.1989)

Profile
- Position: Defensive back

Personal information
- Born: c. 1989 (age 36–37); Garland, Texas, U.S.
- Listed height: 6 ft 1 in (1.85 m)
- Listed weight: 212 lb (96 kg)

Career information
- High school: Garland (TX) South
- College: Texas Christian
- NFL draft: 2011: undrafted

Awards and highlights
- Consensus All-American (2010); First-team All-MW (2010); Second-team All-MW (2009)

Tejay Johnson is a former American college football safety for the TCU Horned Frogs football team of Texas Christian University who earned consensus All-American honors.

A native of Garland, Texas, Johnson attended South Garland High School. Regarded as a three-star recruit by Rivals.com, Johnson was listed as the No. 34 safety prospect in the class of 2007.

Johnson attended Texas Christian University, where he played for the TCU Horned Frogs football team from 2007 to 2010. Following his senior season in 2010, he was recognized as a consensus first-team All-American.

Johnson was projected to be a draft choice in the 2011 NFL draft, but decided to pursue a career in helping the deaf and finishing his degree.
