= Rimington Trophy =

American college football award

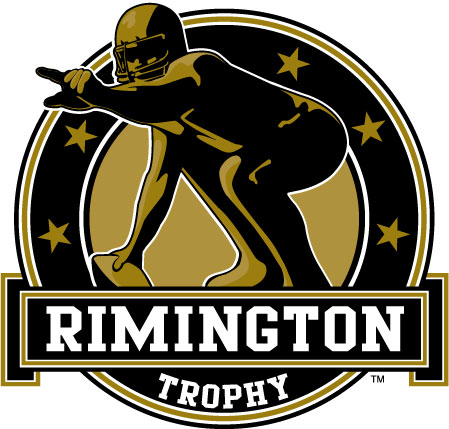
- Awarded for: Most outstanding center in college football
- Country: United States
- Presented by: Boomer Esiason Foundation

History
- First award: 2000
- Most recent: Logan Jones, Iowa
- Website: www.rimingtontrophy.com

The Dave Rimington Trophy is awarded to the player considered to be the best center in college football. Dave Rimington was a center who played at the University of Nebraska from 1979 to 1982.

A member of the National College Football Awards Association, the Rimington Trophy serves as a fundraiser for the Boomer Esiason Foundation's fight against cystic fibrosis. The sculptor of the Dave Rimington Trophy is Marc Mellon, also the sculptor of the NBA MVP Trophy.

== Selection process ==
The winner of the Rimington Trophy is selected by determining the consensus All-American center pick from four existing All-America teams. While more than a dozen All-America football teams are selected annually, the Rimington Trophy committee uses these four prestigious teams to determine a winner:

• American Football Coaches Association
• Walter Camp Foundation
• The Sporting News
• Football Writers Association of America

Because the selectors of these four All-America teams can place centers in a "mix" of offensive linemen that includes guards and tackles, their 11-man first teams can often have two centers. The Rimington Trophy committee's policy is to count all players who play primarily the center position for their respective teams as centers, though they may be listed as guards or tackles on the four All-American teams. The center with the most first-team votes is determined to be the winner. If a tie occurs with first-team votes, then the center with most second-team votes wins. If a tie still exists, the winner is determined by a majority vote from the Rimington Trophy committee.

== Winners ==
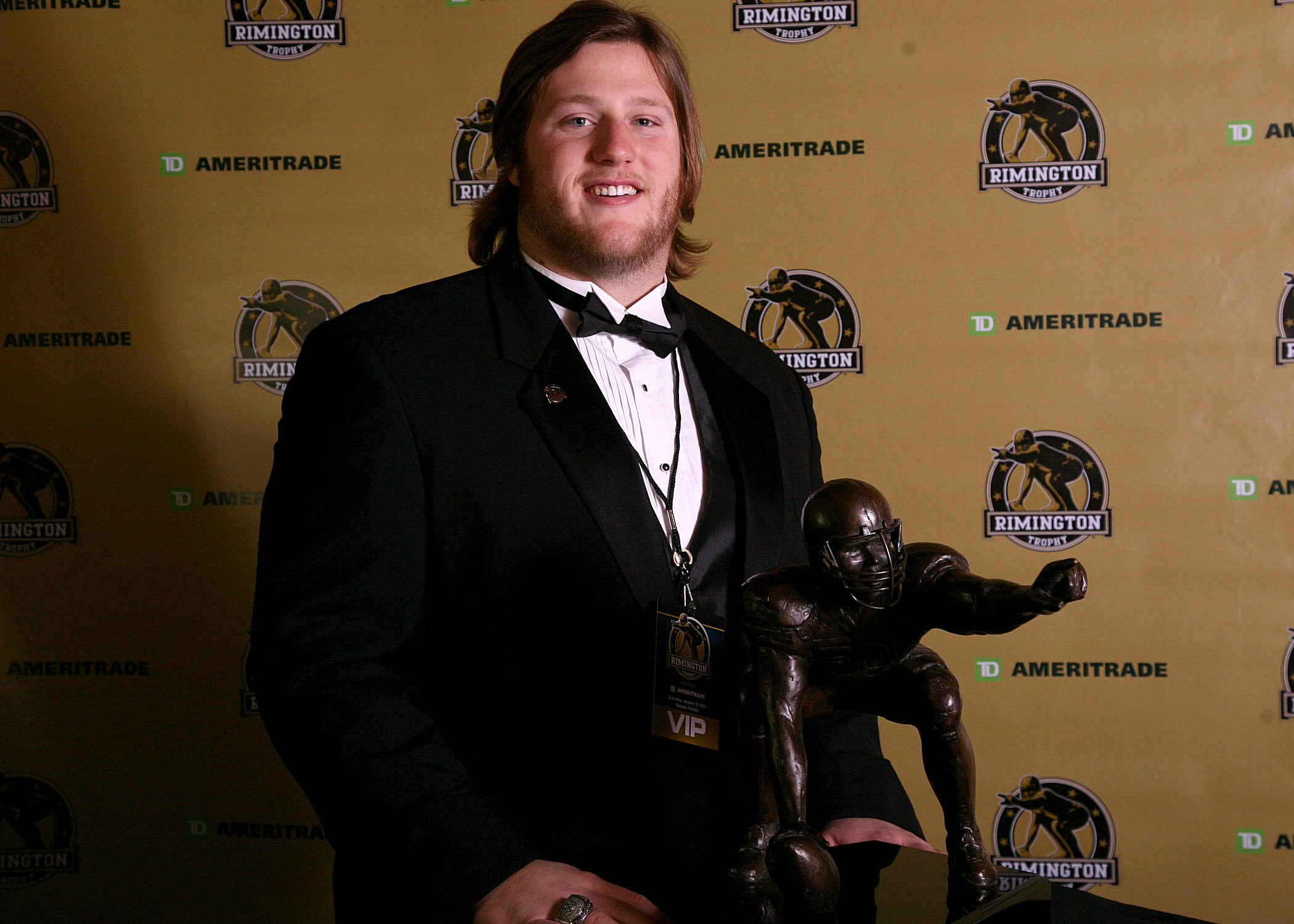
Jake Kirkpatrick of TCU, the 2010 Rimington Trophy winner

Year	Player	School	Ref
2000	Dominic Raiola	Nebraska	
2001	LeCharles Bentley	Ohio State	
2002	Brett Romberg	Miami (FL)	
2003	Jake Grove	Virginia Tech	
2004	David Baas	Michigan	
2004	Ben Wilkerson	LSU	
2005	Greg Eslinger	Minnesota	
2006	Dan Mozes	West Virginia	
2007	Jonathan Luigs	Arkansas	
2008	A. Q. Shipley	Penn State	
2009	Maurkice Pouncey	Florida	
2010	Jake Kirkpatrick	TCU	
2011	David Molk	Michigan (2)	
2012	Barrett Jones	Alabama	
2013	Bryan Stork	Florida State	
2014	Reese Dismukes	Auburn	
2015	Ryan Kelly	Alabama (2)	
2016	Pat Elflein	Ohio State (2)	
2017	Billy Price	Ohio State (3)	
2018	Garrett Bradbury	NC State	
2019	Tyler Biadasz	Wisconsin	
2020	Landon Dickerson	Alabama (3)	
2021	Tyler Linderbaum	Iowa	
2022	Olu Oluwatimi	Michigan (3)	
2023	Jackson Powers-Johnson	Oregon	
2024	Seth McLaughlin	Ohio State (4)	
2025	Logan Jones	Iowa (2)	

== Gerald R. Ford Legends Award ==
Since 2005, the Rimington Trophy also recognizes legendary centers from the past by presenting the President Gerald R. Ford Legendary Center Award, which is named after Gerald Ford. The award is presented annually to a former collegiate or professional center who was either a legend on or off the field by making extraordinary contributions through business, civic, or philanthropic endeavors.

=== Winners ===
Season	Player	School	Tenure
2005	Gerald Ford	Michigan	1932–1934
2006	Jim Otto	Miami (FL)	1957–1959
2007	Alex Kroll	Yale; Rutgers	1956; 1960–1961
2008	Bill Curry	Georgia Tech	1961–1964
2009	Jim Ritcher	NC State	1976–1979
2010	Dwight Stephenson	Alabama	1976–1979
2011	Mick Tingelhoff	Nebraska	1958–1961
2012	Jay Hilgenberg	Iowa	1977–1980
2013	Dermontti Dawson	Kentucky	1984–1987
2014	Courtney Hall	Rice	1985–1988
2015	Jeff Saturday	North Carolina	1993–1997
2016	Carl Mauck	Southern Illinois	1965–1968
2017	Joe Montgomery	William & Mary	1971–1974
2018	Robert Caslen	Army	1972–1975
2019	Dominic Raiola	Nebraska	1997–2000
2020	No winner		
2021	Aaron Graham	Nebraska	1991–1995
2022	Jake Grove	Virginia Tech	2000–2003
2023	Kevin Mawae	LSU	1989–1993
2024	Shaun O'Hara	Rutgers	1995–1999
2025	Kevin Glover	Maryland	1981–1984
