= 2010 Fresno State Bulldogs football team =

American college football season

2010 Fresno State Bulldogs football

Humanitarian Bowl, L 17–40 vs. Northern Illinois
- Conference: Western Athletic Conference
- Record: 8–5 (5–3 WAC)
- Head coach: Pat Hill (14th season)
- Offensive scheme: Pro-style
- Defensive coordinator: Randy Stewart (2nd season)
- Base defense: 4–3
- Home stadium: Bulldog Stadium

2010 Western Athletic Conference football standings
	Conf.			Overall
Team	W		L	W		L
No. 11 Nevada +	7	–	1	13	–	1
No. 9 Boise State +	7	–	1	12	–	1
Hawaii +	7	–	1	10	–	4
Fresno State	5	–	3	8	–	5
Louisiana Tech	4	–	4	5	–	7
Idaho	3	–	5	6	–	7
Utah State	2	–	6	4	–	8
New Mexico State	1	–	7	2	–	10
San Jose State	0	–	8	1	–	12
+ – Conference co-champions; Rankings from AP Poll

The 2010 Fresno State Bulldogs football team represented California State University, Fresno in the 2010 NCAA Division I FBS football season. The Bulldogs, led by 14th-year head coach Pat Hill, were members of the Western Athletic Conference (WAC) and played their home games at Bulldog Stadium in Fresno, California. They finished the season 8–5, 5–3 in WAC play and were invited to the Humanitarian Bowl where they were defeated by Northern Illinois 17–40.

== Personnel ==
=== Coaching staff ===
Name	Position	Seasons at Fresno State	Alma mater
Pat Hill	Head coach	14th as HC; 20th overall	UC Riverside (1973)
Randy Stewart	Defensive coordinator	4th	
Tim Skipper	Linebackers/Run game coordinator	5th	Fresno State (2001)
Keith Williams	Wide receivers	2nd	San Diego State (1996)

== Schedule ==
Date	Time	Opponent	Site	TV	Result	Attendance
September 4	7:00 pm	Cincinnati*	Bulldog Stadium; Fresno, CA	ESPN2	W 28–14	37,238
September 18	5:00 pm	at Utah State	Romney Stadium; Logan, UT	WSN	W 41–24	19,059
September 25	4:30 pm	at Ole Miss*	Vaught–Hemingway Stadium; Oxford, MS	CSS	L 38–55	55,267
October 2	7:00 pm	Cal Poly*	Bulldog Stadium; Fresno, CA		W 38–17	37,069
October 9	7:00 pm	Hawaii	Bulldog Stadium; Fresno, CA (rivalry)	WSN	L 27–49	38,494
October 16	7:00 pm	New Mexico State	Bulldog Stadium; Fresno, CA	ESPNU	W 33–10	32,334
October 23	5:00 pm	at San Jose State	Spartan Stadium; San Jose, CA (rivalry)	WSN	W 33–18	11,314
November 6	1:00 pm	at Louisiana Tech	Joe Aillet Stadium; Ruston, LA	WSN	W 40–34	17,057
November 13	7:30 pm	No. 21 Nevada	Bulldog Stadium; Fresno, CA	ESPN	L 34–35	37,116
November 19	6:30 pm	at No. 3 Boise State	Bronco Stadium; Boise, ID (Battle for the Milk Can)	ESPN2	L 0–51	33,454
November 27	7:00 pm	Idaho	Bulldog Stadium; Fresno, CA	WSN	W 23–20	25,965
December 3	7:15 pm	Illinois*	Bulldog Stadium; Fresno, CA	ESPN2	W 25–23	30,625
December 18	2:30 pm	vs. Northern Illinois*	Bronco Stadium; Boise, ID (Humanitarian Bowl)	ESPN	L 17–40	25,449
*Non-conference game; Rankings from AP Poll released prior to the game; All times are in Pacific time

== Game summaries ==
=== Cincinnati ===
	1	2	3	4	Total
Bearcats	7	7	0	0	14
Bulldogs	0	14	7	7	28

=== At Utah State ===
	1	2	3	4	Total
Bulldogs	3	14	7	17	41
Aggies	7	10	7	0	24

=== At Ole Miss ===
	1	2	3	4	Total
Bulldogs	7	3	14	14	38
Rebels	14	13	14	14	55

=== Cal Poly ===
	1	2	3	4	Total
Mustangs	3	14	0	0	17
Bulldogs	14	7	10	7	38

=== Hawaii ===
	1	2	3	4	Total
Warriors	7	7	21	14	49
Bulldogs	0	10	10	7	27

=== New Mexico State ===
	1	2	3	4	Total
Aggies	3	0	0	7	10
Bulldogs	16	14	0	3	33

=== At San José State ===
	1	2	3	4	Total
Bulldogs	3	7	17	6	33
Spartans	0	0	3	15	18

=== At Louisiana Tech ===
	1	2	3	4	Total
Fresno State Bulldogs	7	3	7	23	40
Louisiana Tech Bulldogs	14	0	7	13	34

=== No. 21 Nevada ===
	1	2	3	4	Total
No. 21 Wolf Pack	7	14	7	7	35
Bulldogs	14	3	14	3	34

=== At No. 3 Boise State ===
	1	2	3	4	Total
Bulldogs	0	0	0	0	0
No. 3 Broncos	3	17	17	14	51

=== Idaho ===
	1	2	3	4	Total
Vandals	0	0	3	17	20
Bulldogs	3	3	7	10	23

=== Illinois ===
	1	2	3	4	Total
Fighting Illini	0	10	7	6	23
Bulldogs	16	3	6	0	25

=== Vs. Northern Illinois (Humanitarian Bowl) ===
	1	2	3	4	Total
Huskies	6	17	10	7	40
Bulldogs	7	3	0	7	17

== Awards ==
=== All-WAC ===
First Team Offense

- OL Kenny Wiggins

First Team Defense

- DL Chris Carter
- DL Logan Harrell
- LB Ben Jacobs

First Team Specialist

- PK Kevin Goessling

Second Team Offense

- WR Jamel Hamler
- OL Bryce Harris

Second Team Defense

- LB Travis Brown
- DB Desia Dunn

=== Player of the Year ===
Defense Chris Carter

== NFL draft ==
5th Round, 162nd Overall Pick by the Pittsburgh Steelers—Sr. LB Chris Carter

7th Round, 210th Overall Pick by the Atlanta Falcons—Sr. G Andrew Jackson
