= 2010 Idaho Vandals football team =

American college football season

2010 Idaho Vandals football
- Conference: Western Athletic Conference
- Record: 6–7 (3–5 WAC)
- Head coach: Robb Akey (4th season)
- Offensive coordinator: Steve Axman (4th season)
- Offensive scheme: Spread
- Defensive coordinator: Mark Criner (4th season)
- Base defense: 4–3
- Home stadium: Kibbie Dome

2010 Western Athletic Conference football standings
	Conf.			Overall
Team	W		L	W		L
No. 11 Nevada +	7	–	1	13	–	1
No. 9 Boise State +	7	–	1	12	–	1
Hawaii +	7	–	1	10	–	4
Fresno State	5	–	3	8	–	5
Louisiana Tech	4	–	4	5	–	7
Idaho	3	–	5	6	–	7
Utah State	2	–	6	4	–	8
New Mexico State	1	–	7	2	–	10
San Jose State	0	–	8	1	–	12
+ – Conference co-champions; Rankings from AP Poll

The 2010 Idaho Vandals football team represented the University of Idaho in the 2010 NCAA Division I FBS football season. The Vandals, led by fourth-year head coach Robb Akey, were members of the Western Athletic Conference (WAC) and played their home games at the Kibbie Dome, an indoor facility on campus in Moscow, Idaho. They finished the season 6–7 overall and 3–5 in WAC play.

== Schedule ==
Date	Time	Opponent	Site	TV	Result	Attendance	Source
September 2	6:00 pm	North Dakota*	Kibbie Dome; Moscow, ID		W 45–0	11,466	
September 11	9:30 am	at No. 6 Nebraska*	Memorial Stadium; Lincoln, NE	FSN PPV	L 17–38	85,732	
September 18	7:30 pm	UNLV*	Kibbie Dome; Moscow, ID	ESPNU	W 30–7	15,390	
September 25	1:00 pm	at Colorado State*	Sonny Lubick Field at Hughes Stadium; Fort Collins, CO		L 34–36	23,925	
October 2	11:00 am	at Western Michigan*	Waldo Stadium; Kalamazoo, MI	WSN	W 33–13	18,508	
October 16	1:00 pm	at Louisiana Tech	Joe Aillet Stadium; Ruston, LA		L 35–48	19,750	
October 23	2:00 pm	New Mexico State^{†}	Kibbie Dome; Moscow, ID	SWX	W 37–14	13,812	
October 30	8:30 pm	at Hawaii	Aloha Stadium; Honolulu, HI		L 10–45	37,466	
November 6	2:00 pm	No. 25 Nevada	Kibbie Dome; Moscow, ID		L 17–63	11,247	
November 12	6:00 pm	No. 4 Boise State	Kibbie Dome; Moscow, ID (rivalry)	ESPN2/ESPN 3D	L 14–52	16,453	
November 20	12:00 pm	at Utah State	Romney Stadium; Logan, UT		W 28–6	14,072	
November 27	7:00 pm	at Fresno State	Bulldog Stadium; Fresno, CA	WSN	L 20–23	25,965	
December 4	2:00 pm	San Jose State	Kibbie Dome; Moscow, ID		W 26–23 ^{OT}	8,011	
*Non-conference game; ^{†}Homecoming; Rankings from AP Poll released prior to the game; All times are in Pacific time

Idaho's home attendance in 2010 was 76,379 for six games, an average of 12,730 per game. The maximum was 16,453 for Boise State on November 12, and the minimum was 8,011 for San Jose State on December 4.

== NFL draft ==
Three Vandals were selected in the 2011 NFL draft, the most taken in one draft since 1972. In that 1972 NFL draft,
which lasted 17 rounds (442 selections), three Vandals were taken from the 1971 Vandal team that went 8-3.
The third Vandal went in the 17th round at #428; the 2011 Draft was just seven rounds (254 selections).

Player	Position	Round	Overall	Franchise
Shiloh Keo	S	5th	144	Houston Texans
Nathan Enderle	QB	5th	160	Chicago Bears
Daniel Hardy	TE	7th	238	Tampa Bay Buccaneers
