= Jake Kirkpatrick =

American college football player (born 1987)

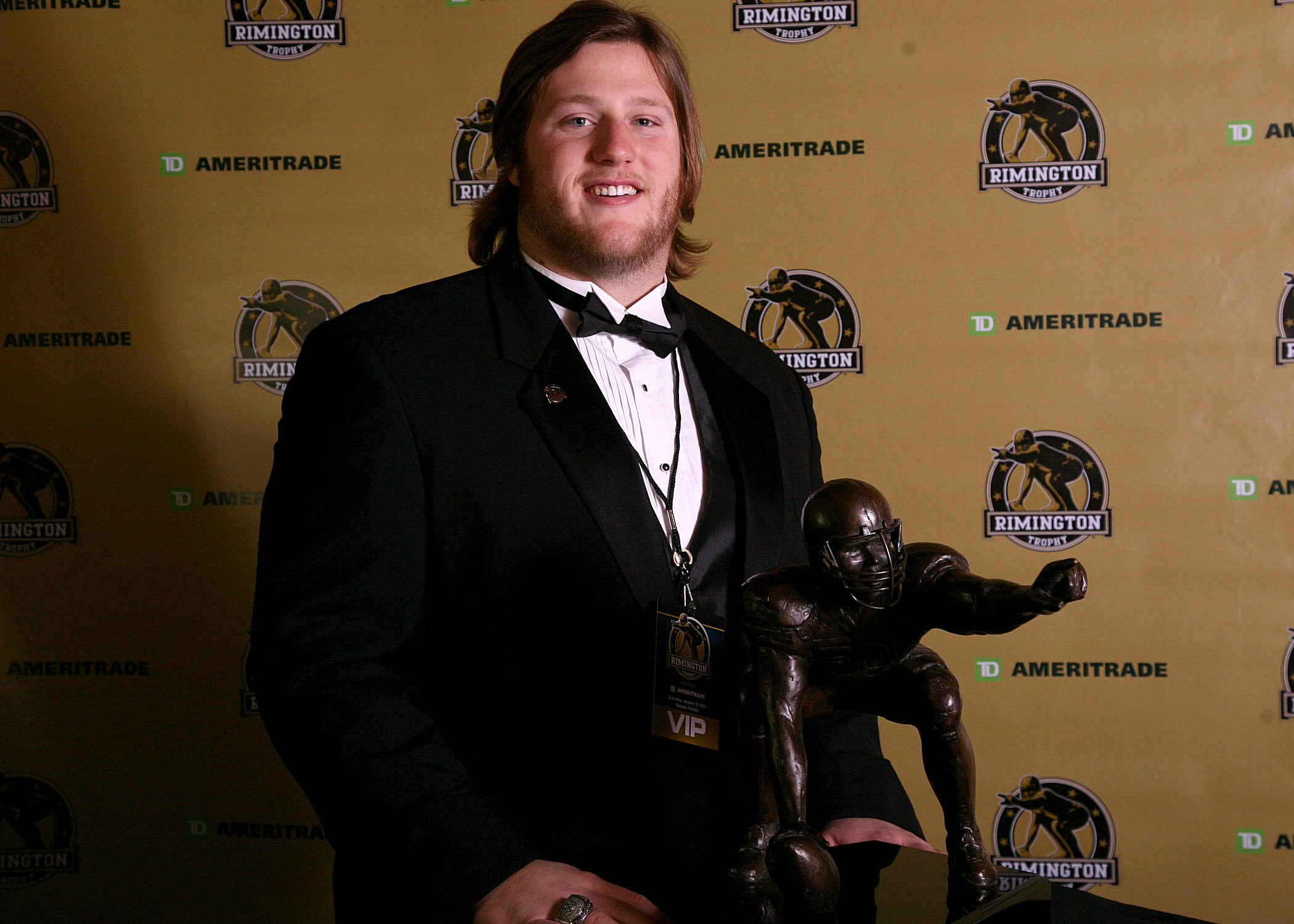
- Kirkpatrick with his Rimington Trophy

No. 76
- Position: Center

Personal information
- Born: July 7, 1987 (age 39); Tyler, Texas, U.S.
- Listed height: 6 ft 3 in (1.91 m)
- Listed weight: 305 lb (138 kg)

Career information
- High school: Robert E. Lee (Tyler, Texas)
- College: TCU (2006–2010)

Awards and highlights
- Rimington Trophy (2010); First-team All-American (2010); First-team All-MW (2010); Second-team All-MW (2009)
- Stats at Pro Football Reference

Jacob Daniel Kirkpatrick (born July 7, 1987) is an American former football center who played college football for the TCU Horned Frogs, where he won the Rimington Trophy in 2010. He was signed by the Indianapolis Colts as an undrafted free agent in 2011, but never played in any NFL game.

== Early life ==
Kirkpatrick attended Robert E. Lee High School in Tyler, Texas, where he started to play football in his senior season, and earned second-team all-district honors at offensive guard. Previously playing basketball, Kirkpatrick was also the 5A District Most Valuable Player in that sport.

Considered only a two-star recruit by Rivals.com, Kirkpatrick was not ranked among the nation's top interior linemen prospects in 2006. In fact, he only drew one scholarship offer, TCU.

== College career ==
After redshirting his initial year at TCU, Kirkpatrick appeared in nine games in 2007 and was also utilized on special teams. In his sophomore year, he was assigned as backup to Blake Schlueter and saw action in 12 of 13 games.

With Schlueter moved on to the NFL, Kirkpatrick took over as starting center for the Horned Frogs in 2009. Calling the blocking scheme on every play, he anchored an offensive line that helped TCU to a perfect 12–0 season, as well as a top-five ranking nationally in scoring offense (40.7 points per game), total offense (469.1 yards per game) and rushing offense (256.5 yards per game).

Kirkpatrick was named a finalist for the 2009 Dave Rimington Trophy, awarded annually to college football's best center, and also received All-American honors by Sports Illustrated. In 2010, Kirkpatrick won the Rimington Trophy.

== Professional career ==
Despite having a stellar career at TCU and being projected a sixth to seventh round pick, Kirkpatrick was not selected in the 2011 NFL draft, which saw only three centers being selected—Stefen Wisniewski, Jason Kelce, and Brandon Fusco.

Pre-draft measurables
Height	Weight	40-yard dash	10-yard split	20-yard split	20-yard shuttle	Three-cone drill	Vertical jump	Broad jump	Bench press
6 ft 1 3/4 in (1.87 m)	300 lb (136 kg)	5.31 s	1.82 s	3.12 s	4.74 s	7.69 s	30 1/2 in (0.77 m)	8 ft 6 in (2.59 m)	25 reps
All values from TCU Pro Day (2011-03-11)

=== Indianapolis Colts ===
Kirkpatrick was signed by the Indianapolis Colts as an undrafted free agent on July 25, 2011. The No. 3 center on the depth chart behind Jeff Saturday and Mike Pollak, he did not see action during the 2011 NFL season. Kirkpatrick was released in June 2012.
