= 2010 Louisiana Tech Bulldogs football team =

American college football season

2010 Louisiana Tech Bulldogs football
- Conference: Western Athletic Conference
- Record: 5–7 (4–4 WAC)
- Head coach: Sonny Dykes (1st season)
- Offensive coordinator: Tony Franklin (1st season)
- Offensive scheme: Air raid
- Defensive coordinator: Tommy Spangler (4th season)
- Base defense: 4–2–5
- Captains: Tank Calais; Adrien Cole; Rob McGill; Josh Victorian
- Home stadium: Joe Aillet Stadium

2010 Western Athletic Conference football standings
	Conf.			Overall
Team	W		L	W		L
No. 11 Nevada +	7	–	1	13	–	1
No. 9 Boise State +	7	–	1	12	–	1
Hawaii +	7	–	1	10	–	4
Fresno State	5	–	3	8	–	5
Louisiana Tech	4	–	4	5	–	7
Idaho	3	–	5	6	–	7
Utah State	2	–	6	4	–	8
New Mexico State	1	–	7	2	–	10
San Jose State	0	–	8	1	–	12
+ – Conference co-champions; Rankings from AP Poll

The 2010 Louisiana Tech Bulldogs football team represented Louisiana Tech University as a member of the Western Athletic Conference (WAC) during the 2010 NCAA Division I FBS football season. Led by first-year head coach Sonny Dykes, the Bulldogs played their home games at Joe Aillet Stadium in Ruston, Louisiana. Louisiana Tech finished the season with a record of 5–7 overall and a mark of 4–4 in conference play, placing fifth in the WAC.

== Schedule ==
Date	Time	Opponent	Site	TV	Result	Attendance
September 4	6:00 pm	vs. Grambling State*	Independence Stadium; Shreveport, LA (Port City Classic)		W 20–6	34,762
September 11	6:00 pm	at Texas A&M*	Kyle Field; College Station, TX		L 16–48	77,579
September 18	6:00 pm	Navy*	Joe Aillet Stadium; Ruston, LA	ESPN3	L 23–37	23,122
September 25	6:00 pm	Southern Miss*	Joe Aillet Stadium; Ruston, LA (Rivalry in Dixie)	ESPN3	L 12–13	22,344
October 2	10:30 pm	at Hawaii	Aloha Stadium; Honolulu, HI	KFVE	L 21–41	29,469
October 9	3:00 pm	Utah State	Joe Aillet Stadium; Ruston, LA	ESPN3, ALT, CST	W 24–6	16,073
October 16	3:00 pm	Idaho^{†}	Joe Aillet Stadium; Ruston, LA	ESPN3, ALT2, CST, MASN	W 48–35	19,750
October 26	7:00 pm	at No. 2 Boise State	Bronco Stadium; Boise, ID	ESPN2	L 20–49	32,026
November 6	3:00 pm	Fresno State	Joe Aillet Stadium; Ruston, LA	ESPN3, WSN	L 34–40	17,057
November 13	7:00 pm	at New Mexico State	Aggie Memorial Stadium; Las Cruces, NM	ESPN3, ALT2, MASN	W 41–20	12,486
November 27	7:00 pm	at San Jose State	Spartan Stadium; San Jose, CA		W 45–38	8,467
December 4	2:00 pm	No. 14 Nevada	Joe Aillet Stadium; Ruston, LA	ESPN3, WSN	L 17–35	18,562
*Non-conference game; ^{†}Homecoming; Rankings from AP Poll released prior to the game; All times are in Central time

== Coaching staff ==
Position	Name	Year at Tech	Alma mater
Head football coach	Sonny Dykes	1st	Texas Tech '93
Offensive coordinator	Tony Franklin	1st	Murray State '77
Defensive coordinator	Tommy Spangler	4th	Georgia '84
Assistant head coach/Wide Receivers	Rob Likens	1st	Mississippi State '90
Linebackers/Recruiting Coordinator	Stan Eggen	3rd	Moorhead State '77
Running backs	Pierre Ingram	1st	Middle Tennessee State '06
Linebackers	Jeff Koonz	1st	Auburn '04
Cornerbacks	Kevin Curtis	1st	Texas Tech
Offensive line	Petey Perot	22nd	Northwestern State '79
Special teams/inside receivers	Mark Tommerdahl	2nd	Concordia '83
Head strength and conditioning coach	Damon Harrington	7th	Louisiana Tech '00
Character education coordinator/ assistant strength and conditioning coach	Ed Jackson	18th	Louisiana Tech '83
Strength and conditioning intern	Jacob Peeler	2nd	Louisiana Tech '06
Graduate assistant (offense)	Zach Yenser	1st	Troy '07
Graduate assistant (defense)	Schirra Fields	2nd	LSU '06
Operations/quality control	Hunter McWilliams	1st	Texas '02
Video operations	David Snyder	3rd	Clemson '05

== Game summaries ==
=== Grambling State ===
	1	2	3	4	Total
Grambling	3	0	3	0	6
LA Tech	7	10	0	3	20

=== Texas A&M ===
	1	2	3	4	Total
LA Tech	3	7	6	0	16
Texas A&M	7	14	17	10	48

=== Navy ===
	1	2	3	4	Total
Navy	7	9	14	7	37
LA Tech	3	20	0	0	23

=== Southern Miss ===
	1	2	3	4	Total
So Miss	3	0	10	0	13
LA Tech	3	0	0	9	12

=== Hawai'i ===
	1	2	3	4	Total
LA Tech	0	7	14	0	21
Hawai'i	10	14	10	7	41

=== Utah State ===
	1	2	3	4	Total
Utah St	0	3	3	0	6
LA Tech	7	10	0	7	24

=== Idaho ===
	1	2	3	4	Total
Idaho	7	7	7	14	35
LA Tech	7	10	21	10	48

=== Boise State ===
	1	2	3	4	Total
LA Tech	7	0	6	7	20
#2 Boise St	14	14	14	7	49

=== Fresno State ===
	1	2	3	4	Total
Fresno St	7	3	7	23	40
LA Tech	14	0	7	13	34

=== New Mexico State ===
	1	2	3	4	Total
LA Tech	14	10	0	17	41
NM State	3	7	7	3	20

=== San Jose State ===
	1	2	3	4	Total
LA Tech	21	10	7	7	45
SJSU	7	14	3	14	38

=== Nevada ===
	1	2	3	4	Total
#17 Nevada	0	14	7	14	35
LA Tech	7	7	3	0	17
