= Aaron Brown (linebacker, born 1988) =

American football player (born 1988)

No. 50
- Position: Linebacker

Personal information
- Born: September 24, 1988 (age 38); Spokane, Washington, U.S.
- Listed height: 6 ft 1 in (1.85 m)
- Listed weight: 225 lb (102 kg)

Career information
- High school: Puyallup (Puyallup, Washington)
- College: Hawaii
- NFL draft: 2012: 7th round, 209th overall pick

Career history
- St. Louis Rams (2012)*
- * Offseason or practice squad member only

Awards and highlights
- First-team All-WAC (2011); 2× First-team All-Mission Conference (2007–2008)

Aaron Brown (born September 24, 1988) is an American former football linebacker. He played college football at the University of Hawaiʻi at Mānoa, and was selected by the St. Louis Rams in the seventh round of the 2012 NFL draft.

== Early life ==
Aaron Brown was born on September 24, 1988, in Spokane, Washington. He played high school football at Puyallup High School in Puyallup, Washington, as a running back and safety. He earned first-team all-league and all-area honors. Brown wrestled in high school as well, and finished third in the state in the 189-pound division his senior year. He graduated in 2007.

Brown played rugby for the local Tsunami's rugby team that finished sixth in the nationals. He was named to the Northwest all-star team in rugby and was also selected to the United States national under-20 rugby union team.

== College career ==
Brown first played college football at Saddleback College from 2007 to 2008. He posted 65 tackles, three forced fumbles, three fumble recoveries, and one interception as a freshman in 2007, earning first-team All-Mission Conference honors. In 2008, he totaled 59 tackles, six sacks, two forced fumbles, six pass breakups, and a team-leading four interceptions. Brown was named first-team All-Mission Conference for the second consecutive season and was also named an honorable mention All-American.

Brown then transferred to the University of Hawaiʻi at Mānoa, where he was a two-year letterman for the Hawaii Rainbow Warriors from 2010 to 2011. He played in the first three games of the 2009 season before being granted a medical hardship due to a hamstring injury. He played in all 14 games, starting ten, at Mac linebacker in 2010, recording 83 tackles, five sacks (tied for the team lead), two forced fumbles, one fumble recovery, six pass breakups, and three interceptions, two of which he returned for touchdowns. Brown was named the Western Athletic Conference (WAC) Defensive Player of the Week for week 12 after intercepting two passes against San Jose State. Brown was suspended for the first game of his senior year after allegedly being involved in a fight at a Waikiki nightclub. He then started the remaining 12 games of the 2011 season, recording 70 solo tackles, 33 assisted tackles, 4.5 sacks, one forced fumble, three fumble recoveries, and three interceptions. He led the team in solo tackles while tying for the team-lead in interceptions and tying for the WAC lead in fumble recoveries. Brown garnered first-team All-WAC recognition for his performance during the 2011 season. In December 2011, he graduated from Hawaii and was also acquitted in the nightclub fight.

== Professional career ==
Brown was not invited to the NFL Combine and ended up pulling his hamstring at Hawaii's pro day. He was selected by the St. Louis Rams in the seventh round, with the 209th overall pick, of the 2012 NFL draft. In regards to Brown being drafted, his agent said "He's probably one of the biggest surprises. I don't know if anybody had him on the (draft) list." Brown officially signed with the Rams on June 1. He was released on August 31 but signed to the team's practice squad on September 2. He was released again on September 14, 2012.

== Post-football career ==
Brown made his amateur mixed martial arts (MMA) debut in 2014. He made his pro MMA debut later that year. He became interested in an MMA career after discussing it with MMA fighter Jake Heun, who was roommates with Brown at Hawaii.
