= 2010 Hawaii Bowl =

2010 Sheraton Hawaii Bowl
Hawaii Warriors	Tulsa Golden Hurricane
(10–3)	(9–3)
WAC	C-USA
35	62
Head coach: Greg McMackin	Head coach: Todd Graham
AP / Coaches / BCS; 24 / 25 / 24	AP / Coaches / BCS; NR / NR / NR
	1	2	3	4	Total
Hawaii	0	14	14	7	35
Tulsa	10	17	21	14	62
- Date: December 24, 2010
- Season: 2010
- Stadium: Aloha Stadium
- Location: Honolulu, Hawaii
- MVP: WR Damaris Johnson, Tulsa; WR Greg Salas, Hawaii
- Favorite: Hawaii by 10
- Referee: Jack Wood (Pac-10)
- Halftime show: Nohelani Cypriano
- Attendance: 43,673
- Payout: US$750,000 per team

United States TV coverage
- Network: ESPN
- Announcers: Ron Franklin, Ed Cunningham and Shelley Smith
- Nielsen ratings: 2.1 / 3.70M

The 2010 Sheraton Hawaii Bowl was the ninth edition of the college football bowl game. The game was played at Aloha Stadium in Honolulu on Friday of Christmas Eve 2010, at 8 p.m. ET. The contest was televised live on ESPN and sponsored by Sheraton Hotels and Resorts. The game featured Tulsa of Conference USA versus Hawai'i of the Western Athletic Conference.

== Teams ==
=== Hawai'i Warriors ===
The game marked Hawai'i's 6th appearance in the Hawai'i Bowl since its inception in 2002. The invitation acceptance marked the earliest acceptance to a bowl game in the school's history. The Warriors finished the regular season with a 10–3 record and a share of the WAC Conference Championship. Although Hawai'i lost to co-champion Boise State they upset Nevada to become co-champions. Hawaii quarterback Bryant Moniz threw for a nation-leading 4,629 yards with 36 touchdowns and 11 interceptions. Top receivers were senior slot receivers Greg Salas and Kealoha Pilares. The Warriors boasted the nation's 8th best team in terms of total offense.

=== Tulsa Golden Hurricane ===
Tulsa made their 3rd bowl appearance in coach Todd Graham's tenure with the team. They entered the game with a 9–3 record which included a key victory over Notre Dame. Overall, the Golden Hurricane won their last six games of the season. Tulsa ranked number 5 in the country in total offense, averaging a total of 503.5 yards per game. Tulsa was 2–0 in bowl games under Graham winning the GMAC Bowl following the 2007 and 2008 seasons. Junior quarterback G.J. Kinne was named offensive Player of the Year and junior Damaris Johnson was named the special teams Player of the Year in the Conference USA.

== Game summary ==
=== Scoring ===
Scoring Play	Score
1st Quarter
Tulsa – Alex Singleton 3-yard run (Kevin Fitzpatrick kick), 12:09	Tulsa 7–0
Tulsa – Kevin Fitzpatrick 42-yard field goal, 1:29	Tulsa 10–0
2nd Quarter
Hawaii – Shane Austin 1-yard run (Scott Enos kick), 12:54	Tulsa 10–7
Tulsa – John Flanders 54-yard interception return from Austin (Fitzpatrick kick), 11:08	Tulsa 17–7
Tulsa – Curnelius Arnick 54-yard interception return from Bryant Moniz (Fitzpatrick kick), 9:34	Tulsa 24–7
Hawaii – Greg Salas 18-yard pass from Moniz (Enos kick), 2:20	Tulsa 24–14
Tulsa – Fitzpatrick 28-yard field goal, 0:16	Tulsa 27–14
3rd Quarter
Hawaii – Salas 5-yard pass from Moniz (Enos kick), 7:28	Tulsa 27–21
Tulsa – Jameel Owens 15-yard pass from G.J. Kinne (Fitzpatrick kick), 6:57	Tulsa 34–21
Hawaii – Alex Green 1-yard run (Enos Kick), 5:47	Tulsa 34–28
Tulsa – Damaris Johnson 67-yard run (Fitzpatrick kick), 4:57	Tulsa 41–28
Tulsa – Thomas Roberson 47-yard pass from Kinne(Fitzpatrick kick), 3:12	Tulsa 48–28
4th Quarter
Hawaii – Royce Pollard 33-yard pass from Moniz(Enos kick), 9:27	Tulsa 48–35
Tulsa – Johnson 3-yard run (Fitzpatrick kick), 7:00	Tulsa 55–35
Tulsa – Johnson 9-yard pass from Kinne (Fitzpatrick kick), 1:16	Tulsa 62–35

=== Statistics ===
Statistics	Hawaii	Tulsa
First downs	27	18
Total offense, plays – yards	57–542	48–534
Rushes-yards (net)	27–71	31–188
Passing yards (net)	471	346
Passes, Comp-Att-Int	30–56–5	17–32–0
Time of Possession	33:30	26:30

== Game notes ==
- The game also marked the first meeting between Tulsa and Hawaii since 2004, the last year Tulsa was in the WAC before leaving for C-USA. Overall Hawaii held a 5–3 advantage in the series. This was the first time the two schools had met in a bowl game.
- Tulsa set a Hawai‘i Bowl record with the 62 points, the most points given up by a UH team since 2005 in a 63–17 loss to then No.1 USC.
