= 2010 Utah State Aggies football team =

American college football season

2010 Utah State Aggies football
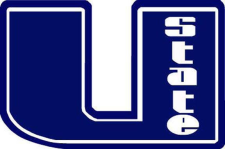

Beehive Boot Winners
- Conference: Western Athletic Conference
- Record: 4–8 (2–6 WAC)
- Head coach: Gary Andersen (2nd season)
- Offensive coordinator: Dave Baldwin (2nd season)
- Defensive coordinator: Bill Busch (2nd season)
- Home stadium: Romney Stadium

2010 Western Athletic Conference football standings
	Conf.			Overall
Team	W		L	W		L
No. 11 Nevada +	7	–	1	13	–	1
No. 9 Boise State +	7	–	1	12	–	1
Hawaii +	7	–	1	10	–	4
Fresno State	5	–	3	8	–	5
Louisiana Tech	4	–	4	5	–	7
Idaho	3	–	5	6	–	7
Utah State	2	–	6	4	–	8
New Mexico State	1	–	7	2	–	10
San Jose State	0	–	8	1	–	12
+ – Conference co-champions; Rankings from AP Poll

The 2010 Utah State Aggies football team represented Utah State University in the 2010 NCAA Division I FBS college football season. The Aggies were led by second-year head coach Gary Andersen and played their home games at the Romney Stadium. They finished the season with a record of 4–8 (2–6 WAC). The Aggies won the Beehive Boot for the first time since 1997.

== Schedule ==
Date	Time	Opponent	Site	TV	Result	Attendance
September 4	5:00 pm	at No. 8 Oklahoma*	Gaylord Family Oklahoma Memorial Stadium; Norman, OK	FSN PPV	L 24–31	85,151
September 11	6:00 pm	Idaho State*	Romney Stadium; Logan, UT		W 38–17	18,347
September 18	6:00 pm	Fresno State	Romney Stadium; Logan, UT	WSN	L 24–41	19,059
September 25	6:00 pm	at San Diego State*	Qualcomm Stadium; San Diego, CA		L 7–41	45,682
October 1	6:00 pm	BYU*	Romney Stadium; Logan, UT (Beehive Boot)	ESPN	W 31–16	24,152
October 9	2:00 pm	at Louisiana Tech	Joe Aillet Stadium; Ruston, LA	Alt	L 6–24	16,073
October 23	3:00 pm	Hawai'i^{†}	Romney Stadium; Logan, UT	Alt	L 7–45	17,111
October 30	7:30 pm	at Nevada	Mackay Stadium; Reno, NV	ESPNU	L 42–56	11,558
November 6	1:00 pm	New Mexico State	Romney Stadium; Logan, UT		W 27–22	14,524
November 13	6:00 pm	at San Jose State	Spartan Stadium; San Jose, CA		W 38–34	12,239
November 20	1:00 pm	Idaho	Romney Stadium; Logan, UT	WSN	L 6–28	14,072
December 4	1:00 pm	at No. 10 Boise State	Bronco Stadium; Boise, ID	WSN	L 14–50	32,101
*Non-conference game; ^{†}Homecoming; Rankings from Coaches' Poll released prior to the game; All times are in Mountain time

== NFL draft ==
3rd Round, 90th Overall Pick by the Philadelphia Eagles—Sr. CB Curtis Marsh
