= 2010 Hawaii Warriors football team =

American college football season

2010 Hawaii Warriors football

WAC co-champion

Hawaii Bowl, L 35–62 vs. Tulsa
- Conference: Western Athletic Conference
- Record: 10–4 (7–1 WAC)
- Head coach: Greg McMackin (3rd season)
- Offensive coordinator: Nick Rolovich (1st season)
- Offensive scheme: Run and shoot, pistol
- Defensive coordinator: Dave Aranda (1st season)
- Base defense: 4–3
- Captains: Vaughn Meatoga; Greg Salas; Corey Paredes
- Home stadium: Aloha Stadium

2010 Western Athletic Conference football standings
	Conf.			Overall
Team	W		L	W		L
No. 11 Nevada +	7	–	1	13	–	1
No. 9 Boise State +	7	–	1	12	–	1
Hawaii +	7	–	1	10	–	4
Fresno State	5	–	3	8	–	5
Louisiana Tech	4	–	4	5	–	7
Idaho	3	–	5	6	–	7
Utah State	2	–	6	4	–	8
New Mexico State	1	–	7	2	–	10
San Jose State	0	–	8	1	–	12
+ – Conference co-champions; Rankings from AP Poll

The 2010 Hawaii Warriors football team represented the University of Hawaii at Manoa in the 2010 NCAA Division I FBS football season. The Warriors, led by third-year head coach Greg McMackin, were members of the Western Athletic Conference (WAC) and played their home games at Aloha Stadium in Halawa, Hawaii. They finished the season 10–4, 7–1 in WAC play to claim a share of the WAC championship with Boise State and Nevada. They were invited to the Hawaii Bowl where they were defeated by Tulsa, 62–35.

== Schedule ==
Date	Time	Opponent	Rank	Site	TV	Result	Attendance	Source
September 2	5:00 pm	No. 14 USC*		Aloha Stadium; Halawa, HI	ESPN	L 36–49	44,204	
September 11	6:00 am	at Army*		Michie Stadium; West Point, NY	CBSCS	W 31–28	30,042	
September 18	9:30 am	at Colorado*		Folsom Field; Boulder, CO	Fox College Sports	L 13–31	47,840	
September 25	5:30 pm	Charleston Southern*		Aloha Stadium; Halawa, HI	Oceanic PPV	W 66–7	30,300	
October 2	5:30 pm	Louisiana Tech		Aloha Stadium; Halawa, HI	Oceanic PPV	W 41–21	29,469	
October 9	4:00 pm	at Fresno State		Bulldog Stadium; Fresno, CA (rivalry)	ESPN3	W 49–27	38,494	
October 16	5:30 pm	No. 19 Nevada		Aloha Stadium; Halawa, HI	ESPN3, WAC Sports Network	W 27–21	42,031	
October 23	11:00 am	at Utah State		Romney Stadium; Logan, UT	ESPN3, Altitude Sports	W 45–7	17,111	
October 30	5:30 pm	Idaho^{†}		Aloha Stadium; Halawa, HI	ESPN3	W 45–10	37,466	
November 6	10:30 am	at No. 2 Boise State		Bronco Stadium; Boise, ID	ESPNU/ESPN 3D	L 7–42	34,060	
November 20	5:30 pm	San Jose State		Aloha Stadium; Halawa, HI (rivalry)	ESPN3	W 41–7	30,011	
November 27	10:00 am	at New Mexico State		Aggie Memorial Stadium; Las Cruces, NM	ESPN3	W 59–24	11,841	
December 4	5:30 pm	UNLV*	No. 25	Aloha Stadium; Halawa, HI	Oceanic PPV	W 59–21	37,820	
December 24	2:00 pm	Tulsa*	No. 24	Aloha Stadium; Halawa, HI (Hawaii Bowl)	ESPN	L 35–62	46,231	
*Non-conference game; ^{†}Homecoming; Rankings from AP Poll released prior to the game; All times are in Hawaii–Aleutian time

== Rankings ==
Ranking movements Legend: ██ Increase in ranking ██ Decrease in ranking — = Not ranked RV = Received votes
	Week															
Poll	Pre	1	2	3	4	5	6	7	8	9	10	11	12	13	14	Final
AP	—	—	—	—	—	—	—	RV	RV	RV	—	—	RV	25	24	RV
Coaches	—	—	—	—	—	—	—	RV	RV	RV	RV	RV	RV	RV	25	RV
Harris	Not released						—	RV	RV	RV	RV	RV	RV	RV	24	Not released
BCS	Not released							—	—	—	—	—	—	—	24	Not released

== Notable players ==
- Bryant Moniz
- Greg Salas
- Alex Green - Achieved school record rushing yard in a single game, 327 against NMSU

== NFL draft ==
3rd Round, 97th Overall Pick by the Green Bay Packers—Sr. RB Alex Green

4th Round, 112th Overall Pick by the St. Louis Rams—Sr. WR Greg Salas

5th Round, 132nd Overall Pick by the Carolina Panthers—Sr. WR Kealoha Pilares
