= Brandyn Thompson =

American football player (born 1989)

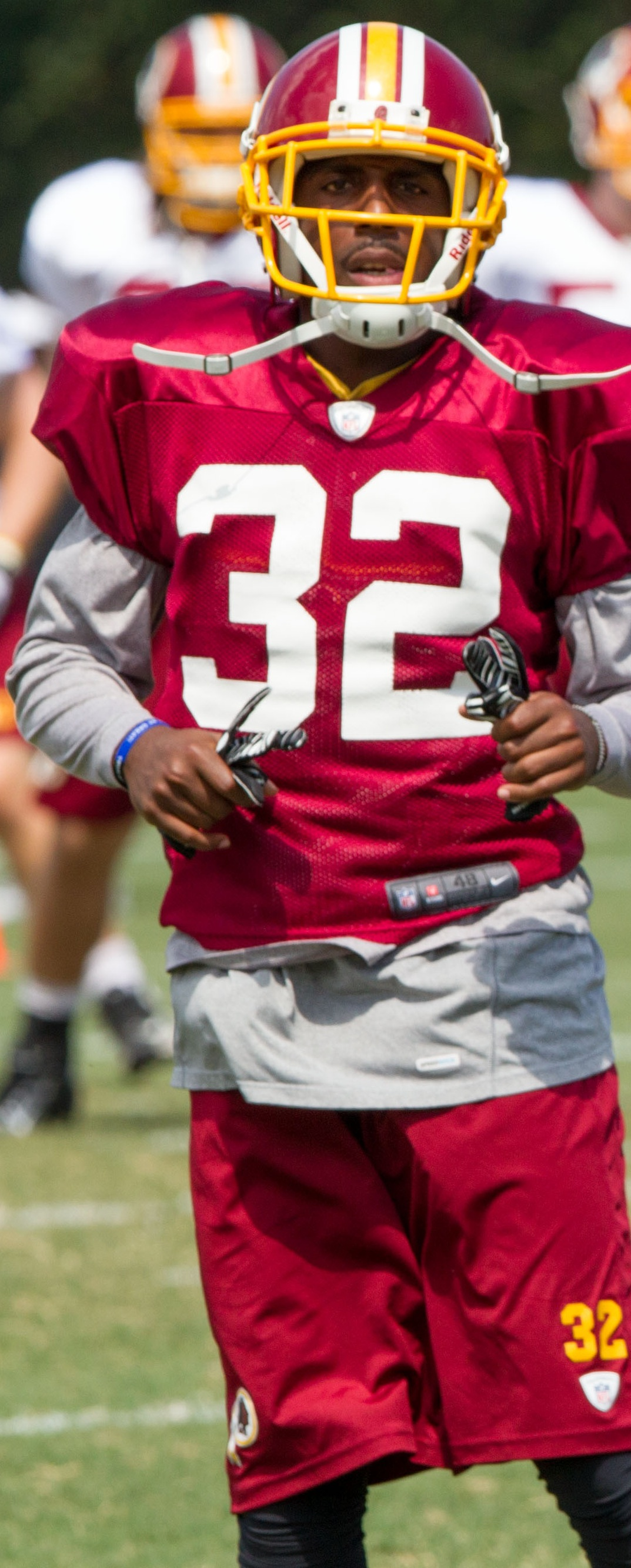
- Thompson with the Washington Redskins in 2012

Cal Poly Mustangs
- Title: Cornerbacks coach

Personal information
- Born: October 30, 1989 (age 37); Elk Grove, California, U.S.
- Listed height: 5 ft 9 in (1.75 m)
- Listed weight: 188 lb (85 kg)

Career information
- High school: Franklin (Elk Grove)
- College: Boise State
- NFL draft: 2011: 7th round, 213th overall pick

Career history

Playing
- Washington Redskins (2011); Toronto Argonauts (2013)*; Ottawa Redblacks (2014–2015); Edmonton Eskimos (2016–2018)
- * Offseason or practice squad member only

Coaching
- Sacramento CC (2022) Defensive backs coach; Cal Poly (2023) Cornerbacks coach; Sacramento State (2024) Cornerbacks coach; Cal Poly (2025-present) Cornerbacks coach

Career NFL statistics
- Total tackles: 2
- Stats at Pro Football Reference

Brandyn Thompson (born October 30, 1989) is an American college football coach and former cornerback. He is the former cornerbacks coach for California State University, Sacramento. He was selected by the Washington Redskins of the National Football League (NFL) in the seventh round of the 2011 NFL draft and was also a member of the Toronto Argonauts, Ottawa Redblacks, and Edmonton Eskimos of the Canadian Football League (CFL). He played college football at Boise State.

== Professional career ==
Pre-draft measurables
Height	Weight	Arm length	Hand span	Wingspan	40-yard dash	10-yard split	20-yard split	20-yard shuttle	Three-cone drill	Vertical jump	Broad jump	Bench press
5 ft 9 1/4 in (1.76 m)	189 lb (86 kg)	29 3/4 in (0.76 m)	9 in (0.23 m)	5 ft 10 5/8 in (1.79 m)	4.45 s	1.58 s	2.53 s	4.12 s	6.66 s	33.5 in (0.85 m)	9 ft 6 in (2.90 m)	13 reps
All values from NFL Combine

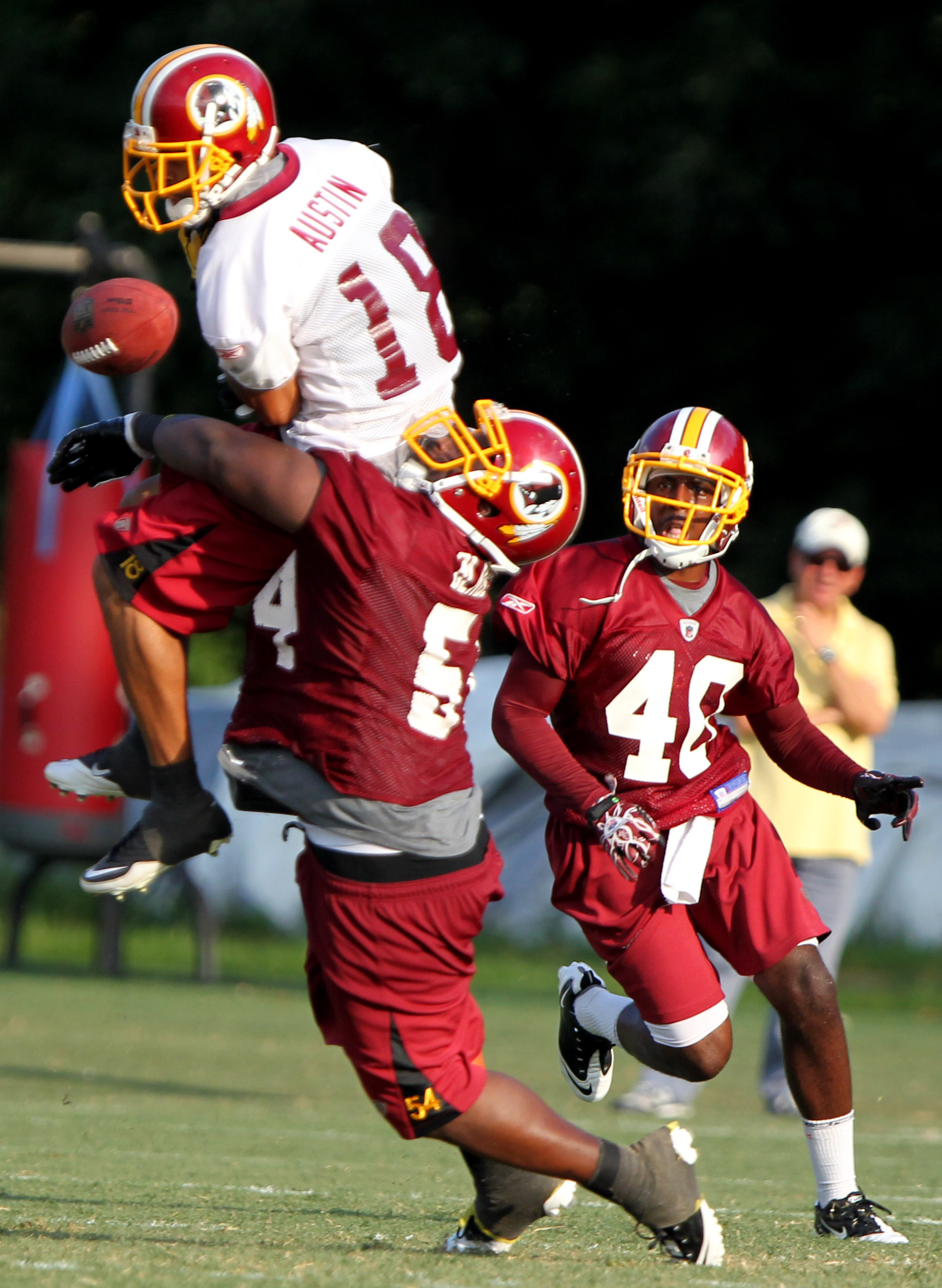
Thompson (right) during Redskins training camp in 2011.

=== Washington Redskins ===
==== 2011 season ====
Thompson was selected by the Washington Redskins in the seventh round of the 2011 NFL draft. Although he made the active 53-man roster at the start of the season, he was waived October 5, to make room for Phillip Buchanon after the latter's suspension ended. On October 6, 2011, Thompson was signed to the Redskins' practice squad. On November 5, 2011, Thompson was promoted back to the active roster after Buchanon was placed on injured reserve. He was waived again on November 8 and placed on the practice squad the next day. After the Redskins cut D.J. Johnson, Thompson was promoted back to active roster on November 30, 2011, to fill the roster spot. At the end of the 2011 NFL season, his rookie season, Thompson played a total of six games and recorded two tackles.

==== 2012 season ====
During the first OTA of the 2012 preseason, Thompson and Pierre Garçon accidentally collided into coach Mike Shanahan. Thompson was cut on August 31, 2012, for final cuts before the start of the 2012 season.

=== Toronto Argonauts ===
On March 8, 2013, Thompson was signed by the Toronto Argonauts of the Canadian Football League. He was released by the Argonauts on May 2, 2013.

=== Ottawa Redblacks ===
On April 23, 2014, Thompson signed a contract with the Ottawa Redblacks of the Canadian Football League. Thompson played two seasons with the Ottawa Redblacks, playing in 17 of the 18 regular season games both years. In his second year in the league Ottawa went all the way to the Grey Cup game where they were defeated by the Edmonton Eskimos. In his two years in Ottawa Thompson totaled 97 tackles, 7 interceptions and 1 forced fumble. Following the 2015 CFL season Thompson became a free-agent on February 9, 2016.

In mid-April 2016, it was reported that Thompson was contemplating whether or not he still wanted to play professional football.

=== Edmonton Eskimos ===
Thompson signed with the Edmonton Eskimos on August 8, 2016. He played for the Eskimos from 2016 to 2018.

== Coaching career ==
=== Sacramento City College ===
In 2022, Thompson was hired as the defensive backs coach for Sacramento City College.

=== Cal Poly ===
In 2023, Thompson was hired as the cornerbacks coach for Cal Poly. With the Mustangs, he helped coach Donovan Saunders to second–team Big Sky honors after Saunders recorded three interceptions and eleven pass breakups.

=== Sacramento State ===
On May 6, 2024, Thompson was hired to serve as the cornerbacks coach at California State University, Sacramento.

== Personal life ==
Thompson's great uncle John Thompson II coached the Georgetown Hoyas basketball team from 1972 to 1999.
