= 2010 New Mexico State Aggies football team =

American college football season

2010 New Mexico State Aggies football
- Conference: Western Athletic Conference
- Record: 2–10 (1–7 WAC)
- Head coach: DeWayne Walker (2nd season)
- Offensive coordinator: Mike Dunbar (1st season)
- Offensive scheme: Spread
- Base defense: 4–3
- Home stadium: Aggie Memorial Stadium

2010 Western Athletic Conference football standings
	Conf.			Overall
Team	W		L	W		L
No. 11 Nevada +	7	–	1	13	–	1
No. 9 Boise State +	7	–	1	12	–	1
Hawaii +	7	–	1	10	–	4
Fresno State	5	–	3	8	–	5
Louisiana Tech	4	–	4	5	–	7
Idaho	3	–	5	6	–	7
Utah State	2	–	6	4	–	8
New Mexico State	1	–	7	2	–	10
San Jose State	0	–	8	1	–	12
+ – Conference co-champions; Rankings from AP Poll

The 2010 New Mexico State Aggies football team represented New Mexico State University as a member of the Western Athletic Conference (WAC) during the 2010 NCAA Division I FBS football season. Led by second-year head coach DeWayne Walker, the Aggies compiled an overall record of 2–10 with a mark of 1–7 in conference play, placing eighth in the WAC. New Mexico State played home games at Aggie Memorial Stadium in Las Cruces, New Mexico.

== Schedule ==
Date	Time	Opponent	Site	TV	Result	Attendance	Source
September 11	6:00 pm	San Diego State*	Aggie Memorial Stadium; Las Cruces, NM		L 21–41	16,891	
September 18	7:00 pm	at UTEP*	Sun Bowl; El Paso, TX (Battle of I-10)		L 10–42	39,214	
September 25	5:00 pm	at Kansas*	Memorial Stadium; Lawrence, KS	FCS	L 16–42	46,719	
October 2	6:00 pm	No. 3 Boise State	Aggie Memorial Stadium; Las Cruces, NM	ESPN3	L 0–59	19,661	
October 9	6:00 pm	New Mexico*	Aggie Memorial Stadium; Las Cruces, NM (Rio Grande Rivalry)	ESPN3	W 16–14	21,437	
October 16	8:00 pm	at Fresno State	Bulldog Stadium; Fresno, CA	ESPNU	L 10–33	32,334	
October 23	3:00 pm	at Idaho	Kibbie Dome; Moscow, ID	AV	L 14–37	13,812	
October 30	2:00 pm	San Jose State^{†}	Aggie Memorial Stadium; Las Cruces, NM	AV	W 29–27	13,117	
November 6	1:00 pm	at Utah State	Romney Stadium; Logan, UT		L 22–27	14,524	
November 13	6:00 pm	Louisiana Tech	Aggie Memorial Stadium; Las Cruces, NM	ESPN Plus	L 20–41	12,486	
November 20	2:00 pm	at No. 19 Nevada	Mackay Stadium; Reno, NV		L 6–52	10,906	
November 27	6:00 pm	Hawaii	Aggie Memorial Stadium; Las Cruces, NM	ESPN Plus	L 24–59	11,841	
*Non-conference game; ^{†}Homecoming; Rankings from AP Poll released prior to the game; All times are in Mountain time

== NFL draft ==
- Davon House, fourth Round, 131 overall pick by the Green Bay Packers
