= 2010 San Jose State Spartans football team =

American college football season

2010 San Jose State Spartans football
- Conference: Western Athletic Conference
- Record: 1–12 (0–8 WAC)
- Head coach: Mike MacIntyre (1st season)
- Offensive coordinator: Tim Landis
- Defensive coordinator: Kent Baer (1st season)
- Home stadium: Spartan Stadium

2010 Western Athletic Conference football standings
| | Conf. | | | Overall |
| Team | W | | L | W | | L |
|---|---|---|---|---|---|---|
| No. 11 Nevada + | 7 | – | 1 | 13 | – | 1 |
| No. 9 Boise State + | 7 | – | 1 | 12 | – | 1 |
| Hawaii + | 7 | – | 1 | 10 | – | 4 |
| Fresno State | 5 | – | 3 | 8 | – | 5 |
| Louisiana Tech | 4 | – | 4 | 5 | – | 7 |
| Idaho | 3 | – | 5 | 6 | – | 7 |
| Utah State | 2 | – | 6 | 4 | – | 8 |
| New Mexico State | 1 | – | 7 | 2 | – | 10 |
| San Jose State | 0 | – | 8 | 1 | – | 12 |
+ – Conference co-champions; Rankings from AP Poll

The 2010 San Jose State Spartans football team represented San Jose State University in the 2010 NCAA Division I FBS football season. The Spartans were led by first year head coach Mike MacIntyre. They played their home games at Spartan Stadium and are members of the Western Athletic Conference. They finished the season 1–12, 0–8 in WAC play.

== Schedule ==
| Date | Time | Opponent | Site | TV | Result | Attendance | Source |
|---|---|---|---|---|---|---|---|
| September 4 | 4:00 pm | at No. 1 Alabama* | Bryant–Denny Stadium; Tuscaloosa, AL | ESPN3, PPV | L 3–48 | 101,821 | |
| September 11 | 9:00 am | at No. 11 Wisconsin* | Camp Randall Stadium; Madison, WI | ESPN | L 14–27 | 78,469 | |
| September 18 | 5:00 pm | Southern Utah* | Spartan Stadium; San Jose, CA | | W 16–11 | 16,739 | |
| September 25 | 5:00 pm | at No. 13 Utah* | Rice–Eccles Stadium; Salt Lake City, UT | | L 3–56 | 45,099 | |
| October 2 | 5:00 pm | UC Davis*^{†} | Spartan Stadium; San Jose, CA | | L 13–14 | 17,844 | |
| October 9 | 6:30 pm | at No. 23 Nevada | Mackay Stadium; Reno, NV | ESPNU | L 13–35 | 20,636 | |
| October 16 | 5:00 pm | No. 3 Boise State | Spartan Stadium; San Jose, CA | ESPN3 | L 0–48 | 20,239 | |
| October 23 | 5:00 pm | Fresno State | Spartan Stadium; San Jose, CA (rivalry) | KOFY, WSN | L 18–33 | 11,314 | |
| October 30 | 1:00 pm | at New Mexico State | Aggie Memorial Stadium; Las Cruces, NM | | L 27–29 | 13,117 | |
| November 13 | 5:00 pm | Utah State | Spartan Stadium; San Jose, CA | | L 34–38 | 12,239 | |
| November 20 | 7:30 pm | at Hawaii | Aloha Stadium; Halawa, HI (Dick Tomey Legacy Game) | Oceanic PPV, KFVE | L 7–41 | 33,523 | |
| November 27 | 5:00 pm | Louisiana Tech | Spartan Stadium; San Jose, CA | KOFY, WSN | L 38–45 | 8,467 | |
| December 4 | 2:00 pm | at Idaho | Kibbie Dome; Moscow, ID | | L 23–26 ^{OT} | 8,011 | |
*Non-conference game; ^{†}Homecoming; Rankings from AP Poll released prior to the game; All times are in Pacific time

== Game summaries ==
=== At No. 1 Alabama ===
| | 1 | 2 | 3 | 4 | Total |
|---|---|---|---|---|---|
| Spartans | 3 | 0 | 0 | 0 | 3 |
| No. 1 Crimson Tide | 14 | 17 | 10 | 7 | 48 |

=== At No. 11 Wisconsin ===
| | 1 | 2 | 3 | 4 | Total |
|---|---|---|---|---|---|
| Spartans | 0 | 0 | 7 | 7 | 14 |
| No. 11 Badgers | 7 | 10 | 3 | 7 | 27 |

=== Southern Utah ===
| | 1 | 2 | 3 | 4 | Total |
|---|---|---|---|---|---|
| Thunderbirds | 0 | 5 | 6 | 0 | 11 |
| Spartans | 3 | 7 | 0 | 6 | 16 |

=== At No. 13 Utah ===
| | 1 | 2 | 3 | 4 | Total |
|---|---|---|---|---|---|
| Spartans | 3 | 0 | 0 | 0 | 3 |
| No. 13 Utes | 7 | 28 | 7 | 14 | 56 |

=== UC Davis ===
| | 1 | 2 | 3 | 4 | Total |
|---|---|---|---|---|---|
| Aggies | 0 | 0 | 14 | 0 | 14 |
| Spartans | 10 | 3 | 0 | 0 | 13 |

=== At No. 23 Nevada ===
| | 1 | 2 | 3 | 4 | Total |
|---|---|---|---|---|---|
| Spartans | 10 | 3 | 0 | 0 | 13 |
| No. 23 Wolf Pack | 14 | 7 | 7 | 7 | 35 |

=== No. 3 Boise State ===
| | 1 | 2 | 3 | 4 | Total |
|---|---|---|---|---|---|
| No. 3 Broncos | 21 | 20 | 7 | 0 | 48 |
| Spartans | 0 | 0 | 0 | 0 | 0 |

=== Fresno State ===
| | 1 | 2 | 3 | 4 | Total |
|---|---|---|---|---|---|
| Bulldogs | 3 | 7 | 17 | 6 | 33 |
| Spartans | 0 | 0 | 3 | 15 | 18 |

=== At New Mexico State ===
| | 1 | 2 | 3 | 4 | Total |
|---|---|---|---|---|---|
| Spartans | | | | | 0 |
| Aggies | | | | | 0 |

=== Utah State ===
| | 1 | 2 | 3 | 4 | Total |
|---|---|---|---|---|---|
| Aggies | 14 | 3 | 7 | 14 | 38 |
| Spartans | 10 | 3 | 7 | 14 | 34 |

=== At Hawaii ===
| | 1 | 2 | 3 | 4 | Total |
|---|---|---|---|---|---|
| Spartans | 0 | 7 | 0 | 0 | 7 |
| Warriors | 10 | 17 | 14 | 0 | 41 |

=== Louisiana Tech ===
| | 1 | 2 | 3 | 4 | Total |
|---|---|---|---|---|---|
| Bulldogs | 21 | 10 | 7 | 7 | 45 |
| Spartans | 7 | 14 | 3 | 14 | 38 |

=== At Idaho ===
| | 1 | 2 | 3 | 4 | OT | Total |
|---|---|---|---|---|---|---|
| Spartans | 0 | 7 | 6 | 7 | 3 | 23 |
| Vandals | 0 | 3 | 7 | 10 | 6 | 26 |

== Personnel ==
=== Coaching staff ===
Following the retirement of head coach Dick Tomey at the end of the 2009 season, San Jose State hired Mike MacIntyre as Tomey's replacement. Athletic director Tom Bowen planned on making a full 85 scholarship athletes available to the football team, as Academic Progress Rate penalties in 2006 limited yearly scholarships to between 67 and 72.

| Name | Position | Seasons at San Jose State | Alma mater |
|---|---|---|---|
| Mike MacIntyre | Head coach | 1 | Georgia Tech (1989) |
| Kent Baer | Defensive coordinator, linebackers | 3 | Utah State (1973) |
| Gary Bernardi | Offensive line | 1 | Cal State Northridge (1976) |
| Brent Brennan | Wide receivers | 6 | UCLA (1996) |
| Charles Clark | Defensive backs | 1 | Mississippi (2007) |
| John DeFilippo | Quarterbacks | 1 | James Madison (2000) |
| Kinji Green | Cornerbacks | 1 | San Jose State (2006) |
| Tim Landis | Offensive coordinator, tight ends | 1 | Randolph–Macon (1986) |
| Terry Malley | Running backs, recruiting coordinator | 2 | Santa Clara (1976) |
| Bryant Young | Defensive line | 1 | Notre Dame (1994) |

=== Roster ===
| No. | Name | Pos. | Ht. | Wt. | Cls. | Hometown (H.S./Prev. Exp.) |
|---|---|---|---|---|---|---|
| 1 | Josh Harrison | WR | 5-11 | 180 | Jr. | Oxnard, Ca. (Rio Mesa HS) |
| 2 | Duke Ihenacho | S | 6-1 | 210 | Sr. | Carson, Ca. (Serra HS) |
| 3 | Chris Bryant | TE | 6-5 | 235 | Sr. | Pasadena, Ca. (Glendale College) (Pasadena HS) |
| 3 | Pompey Festejo | LB | 6-0 | 215 | Sr. | Benicia, Ca. (Benicia HS) |
| 4 | Michael Avila | WR | 5-9 | 175 | Jr. | Seaside, Ca. (Seaside HS) |
| 5 | Alex Germany | CB | 5-9 | 181 | Jr. | Palm Desert, Ca. (Palm Desert HS) |
| 6 | Damon Ogburn, Jr. | ATH | 5-11 | 180 | Fr. | San Bernardino, Ca. (Arroyo Valley HS) |
| 7 | Matt Faulkner | QB | 6-2 | 205 | Jr. | Highland Park, Texas (Mount San Antonio College, Fresno State U.) (Marcus HS) |
| 8 | Brandon Driver | CB | 6-0 | 185 | Jr. | Baltimore, Maryland. (Santa Rosa College) (Parkville HS) |
| 9 | Brandon Rutley | RB | 5-10 | 190 | Jr. | Martinez, Calif. (Alhambra HS) |
| 10 | Harrison Waid | PK | 6-1 | 175 | Fr. | Sunnyvale, Calif. (Fremont HS) |
| 11 | Rashad Gayden | LB | 6-2 | 255 | Jr. | Brooklyn Park, Minnesota. (College of the Sequoias) (Robbinsdale Cooper HS) |
| 12 | Philip Bliss | PK/P | 5-11 | 175 | Jr. | Santa Cruz, Calif. (Cabrillo College) (Scotts Valley HS) |
| 12 | Jordan La Secla | QB | 6-3 | 205 | Sr. | Newbury Park, Calif. (Newbury Park HS) |
| 13 | Kyler O'Neal | LB | 6-0 | 213 | So. | Oakland, Calif. (McClymonds HS) |
| 14 | Blake Jurich | QB | 6-4 | 220 | Fr. | Santa Cruz, Calif. (Scotts Valley HS) |
| 15 | Doug Parris | ATH | 6-2 | 195 | Fr. | San Francisco, Calif. (Sacred Heart Cathedral) |
| 16 | Evan Taylor | S | 6-0 | 192 | So. | San Diego, Calif. (Mission Bay HS) |
| 17 | Terrance Foster | DB | 6-1 | 190 | Jr. | Fullerton, Calif. (Cerritos College) (Sonora HS) |
| 17 | Kyle Nunn | WR | 6-3 | 190 | Fr. | Carson, Calif. (Mira Costa HS) |
| 18 | Dasmen Stewart | QB | 6-3 | 205 | Fr. | Oxnard, Calif. (Oxnard HS) |
| 19 | Peyton Thompson | CB | 5-11 | 180 | Jr. | Granite Bay, Calif. (Granite Bay HS) |
| 20 | David Freeman | RB | 5-8 | 195 | So. | Inglewood, Calif. (University of Washington) (Inglewood HS) |
| 21 | Bené Benwikere | CB | 6-0 | 190 | Fr. | Los Angeles, Calif. (Serra HS) |
| 22 | Lamon Muldrow | RB | 5-9 | 210 | Sr. | Pittsburg, Calif. (Sierra College) (Cordova HS) |
| 22 | Deven Rall | S | 6-1 | 180 | Fr. | Torrance, Calif. (South Torrance HS) |
| 23 | Noel Grigsby | WR | 5-10 | 170 | Fr. | Los Angeles, Calif. (Crenshaw HS) |
| 24 | Devin Newsome | WR | 5-10 | 185 | Sr. | North Highlands, Calif. (Roseville HS) |
| 25 | Ronnie Yell | DB | 5-9 | 175 | So. | San Diego, Calif. (Lincoln HS) |
| 26 | Mohamed Marah | DE | 6-0 | 245 | Sr. | San Jose, Calif. (Oak Grove HS) |
| 27 | Ben Thompson | RB | 6-2 | 220 | Fr. | Temecula, Calif (Temecula Valley HS) |
| 28 | Elijah Shittu | CB | 6-0 | 185 | Sr. | Anchorage, Alaska (West Hills College Coalinga) (Bartlett HS) |
| 29 | Chris Hill | CB | 5-9 | 175 | So. | Carson, Calif. (Carson HS) |
| 30 | Josh Brown | RB | 5-7 | 180 | Jr. | Stockton, Calif. (Edison HS) |
| 30 | Ralph Johnson | CB | 5-10 | 175 | So. | Oakland, Calif. (McClymonds HS) |
| 31 | Keith Smith | LB | 6-2 | 225 | Fr. | Covina, Calif. (Charter Oak HS) |
| 32 | Jason Simpson | LB | 6-0 | 200 | Fr. | Redwood City, Calif. (Woodside HS) |
| 33 | Dominique Hunsucker | RB | 5-9 | 194 | Sr. | San Jose, Calif. (Valley Christian HS) |
| 34 | Derek Muuava | ATH | 6-1 | 215 | Fr. | San Jose, Calif. (Independence HS) |
| 35 | Forrest Hightower | RB | 5-10 | 180 | Fr. | Concord, Calif. (Concord HS) |
| 36 | Vince Buhagiar | TE | 6-4 | 235 | Fr. | Concord, Calif. (Clayton Valley HS) |
| 37 | Courtlin Thompso | S | 6-2 | 195 | Fr. | Lancaster, Calif. (Antelope Valley Christian HS) |
| 37 | Sam Tomlitz | TE | 6-3 | 235 | Fr. | San Jose, Calif. (Archbishop Mitty HS) |
| 38 | Christian Hutchins | WR | 6-2 | 200 | Fr. | Newbury Park, Calif. (Newbury Park HS) |
| 38 | Manu Ngatikaura | S | 5-10 | 185 | Sr. | Laie, Hawaii (San Jose City College) (Kahuku HS) |
| 39 | Cullen Newsome | S | 5-10 | 200 | Jr. | Roseville, Calif. (American River College) (Roseville HS) |
| 40 | Tiuke Tuipulotu | LB | 5-11 | 205 | Jr. | Menlo Park, Calif. (Serra HS) |
| 41 | Nick Grodotzke | LB | 6-1 | 225 | Fr. | Agoura Hills, Calif. (Chaminade Prep) |
| 41 | Jeffrey Telles | LS | 6-1 | 250 | Fr. | Tracy, Calif. (St. Mary's HS) |
| 42 | Ja'Van Hall | DE | 6-2 | 245 | Fr. | Marin City, Calif. (Tamalpais High School) |
| 42 | Ina Liaina | RB | 6-1 | 225 | So. | Oxnard, Calif. (Rio Mesa HS) |
| 43 | Travis Johnson | DE | 6-3 | 235 | So. | Sunnyvale, Calif. (The King's Academy) |
| 44 | Wade O'Neill | RB | 6-1 | 225 | So. | Chino Hills, Calif. (Chino Hills HS) |
| 45 | Matt McCoy | RB | 6-0 | 250 | Jr. | King City, Calif. (Gavilan College) (King City HS) |
| 46 | Ray Rodriguez | TE | 6-1 | 270 | So. | Hacienda Heights, Calif. (Los Altos HS) |
| 48 | Marcos Garces | RB | 5-10 | 176 | Jr. | San Jose, Calif. (Willow Glen HS) |
| 48 | Ryno Gonzalez | LB | 6-1 | 230 | Sr. | Loomis, Calif. (Del Oro HS) |
| 49 | Osa Aigbuza | RB | 5-10 | 185 | So. | San Francisco (Riordan HS) |
| 49 | Anthony Pohahau | LB | 5-11 | 245 | Fr. | Santa Clara, Calif. (Wilcox HS) |
| 50 | Tracy Pugh | DE | 6-4 | 235 | So. | Chino Hills, Calif. (Chino Hills HS) |
| 51 | David Peterson | OL | 6-5 | 275 | Fr. | Redlands, Calif. (East Valley HS) |
| 53 | Vincent Abbott | DE | 6-0 | 230 | So. | Long Beach, Calif. (Lakewood HS) |
| 54 | Reuben Hasani | C | 6-3 | 280 | Fr. | Los Angeles, Calif. (Venice HS) |
| 56 | Braden Storaasli | LB | 6-0 | 213 | Sr. | Kapolei, Hawaii (Damien Memorial HS) |
| 57 | Charles Scicli | LB | 6-0 | 230 | So. | Thousand Palms, Calif. (Palm Desert HS) |
| 59 | Tristan Coleman | LB | 6-2 | 230 | Jr. | Sacramento, Calif. (San Jose City College) (River City HS) |
| 60 | Ben Zorn | OG | 6-3 | 270 | So. | Berkeley, Calif. (George Mason HS) |
| 61 | Amar Pal | OT | 6-5 | 280 | Fr. | Santa Monica, Calif. (Santa Monica HS) |
| 62 | Jeff Grattan | OL | 6-5 | 275 | Fr. | Campbell, Calif. (Gavilan College) (Westmont HS) |
| 63 | Jake Peterson | OL | 6-4 | 300 | Fr. | El Cajon, Calif. (West Hills HS) |
| 64 | Abasi Salimu | DE | 6-5 | 255 | Fr. | Los Angeles, Calif. (Crenshaw HS) |
| 65 | Fred Koloto | OT | 6-3 | 290 | Jr. | Palo Alto, Calif. (Palo Alto HS) |
| 66 | Nick Marini | DT | 6-2 | 250 | Fr. | Mission Viejo, Calif. (Mission Viejo HS) |
| 67 | Norman Romero | OL | 6-0 | 265 | Sr. | South Gate, Calif. (South Gate HS) |
| 68 | Daniel Schroeder | OG | 6-2 | 293 | Jr. | San Jose, Calif. (Foothill College) (Leland HS) |
| 69 | Jacob Orth | OG | 6-3 | 290 | Jr. | Modesto, Calif. (College of San Mateo) (Modsto Central Catholic HS) |
| 70 | Robbie Reed | C | 6-3 | 290 | Sr. | Claremont, Calif. (Cheshire Academy) (Claremont HS) |
| 71 | Keith Bendixen | OL | 6-5 | 258 | Fr. | Santa Maria, Calif. (St. Joseph) |
| 72 | Isaac Leatiota | OG | 6-4 | 305 | Sr. | Sunnyvale, Calif. (Wilcox HS) |
| 73 | Ailao Eliapo | OG | 6-2 | 320 | Sr. | South San Francisco, Calif. (South San Francisco HS) |
| 74 | Ryan Jones | OG | 6-3 | 275 | Fr. | San Francisco, Calif. (Riordan HS) |
| 75 | Nicholas Kaspar | OT | 6-5 | 270 | Fr. | Dana Point, Calif. (Dana Hills HS) |
| 76 | David Quessenberry | OT | 6-6 | 290 | So. | Carlsbad, Calif. (La Costa Canyon HS) |
| 77 | Pierce Burton | OT | 6-6 | 250 | Fr. | Sacramento, CA (Rio Americano HS) |
| 78 | Andres Vargas | OT | 6-4 | 305 | Jr. | San Carlos, Calif. (Saint Francis HS) |
| 80 | Avelino Valencia | TE | 6-5 | 250 | Sr. | Anaheim, Calif. (Fullerton College) (Katella HS) |
| 81 | James Orth | WR | 6-2 | 190 | So. | Modesto, Calif. (Mdesto Central Catholic HS) |
| 82 | Ryan Otten | TE | 6-5 | 230 | So. | Loomis, Calif. (Del Oro HS) |
| 83 | Cedric Lousi | DE | 6-2 | 245 | Fr. | Fremont, Calif. (Washington HS) |
| 84 | Sean Linton | WR | 6-2 | 180 | Fr. | La Mesa, Calif. (Helix HS) |
| 85 | Keenan Brown | TE | 6-4 | 260 | So. | San Bernardino, Calif. (Arroyo Valley HS) |
| 86 | Andrew Reye | WR | 6-1 | 180 | Jr. | Salinas, Calif. (Palma HS) |
| 87 | Akeem King | WR | 6-3 | 190 | Fr. | Nipomo, Calif. (Nipomo HS) |
| 88 | Jalal Beauchman | WR | 6-4 | 220 | Sr. | San Jose, Calif. (Bellarmine Prep) |
| 89 | Chandler Jones | WR | 5-9 | 165 | Fr. | Los Angeles, Calif. (Bishop Montgomery HS) |
| 91 | Joe Nigos | DE | 6-2 | 260 | Jr. | San Jose, Calif. (Oak Grove HS) |
| 92 | Pablo Garcia | DT | 6-2 | 290 | Jr. | San Jose, Calif. (Archbishop Mitty HS) |
| 93 | Foloi Vae | DE/TE | 6-3 | 245 | Fr. | Stockton, Calif. (Edison HS) |
| 94 | JaRodd Watson | DT | 6-2 | 275 | Jr. | San Diego, Calif. (Grossmont College) (La Jolla HS) |
| 95 | Sean Bacon | DE | 6-2 | 215 | Fr. | Inglewood, Calif. (Serra HS) |
| 96 | Marcus Howard | DE | 6-2 | 254 | Fr. | Inglewood, Calif. (Inglewood HS) |
| 97 | Anthony Larceval | DT | 6-1 | 265 | Fr. | Spring Valley, Calif. (Helix HS) |
| 99 | Andrew Moeaki | DT | 6-2 | 290 | Jr. | San Mateo, Calif. (College of San Mateo) (San Mateo HS) |
