= Daniel Hardy (tight end) =

American football player (born 1987)

No. 69
- Position: Tight end

Personal information
- Born: September 7, 1987 (age 39); Anchorage, Alaska, U.S.
- Listed height: 6 ft 4 in (1.93 m)
- Listed weight: 249 lb (113 kg)

Career information
- High school: West Anchorage
- College: Idaho
- NFL draft: 2011: 7th round, 238th overall pick

Career history
- Tampa Bay Buccaneers (2011)*; New Orleans Saints (2011)*; Minnesota Vikings (2012)*
- * Offseason or practice squad member only
- Stats at Pro Football Reference

Daniel Hardy Jr. (born September 7, 1987) is an American former professional football player who was a tight end in the National Football League (NFL). He was selected by the Tampa Bay Buccaneers in the seventh round of the 2011 NFL draft. He played college football at the University of Idaho.

== Early life ==
Daniel Hardy Jr was born September 7, 1987 to Kathleen Leary and Dan Hardy Sr in Anchorage, Alaska.

As a child, he was fascinated with sports and had a childhood dream of becoming a professional athlete in either basketball, football or soccer.

After excelling in all 3 sports and lettering in them on Varsity his senior year, he graduated in 2006 at West High School.

== College career ==
Being lightly recruited out of Anchorage, Daniel had small offers to play basketball, football and soccer at the Community College and Division 2 levels. Having a desire to play Division 1, however, he walked-on at the University of Idaho in the fall of 2006.

Coach Dennis Erickson, who had recruited him, left after one season to become the Head Coach at the Arizona State University. As a result, Hardy had to earn an entire new coaching staffs trust, and was delayed in earning a scholarship.

In 2008, after 2 years on the scout team, the coaching staff asked Hardy to switch from wide receiver to tight end. Hardy finished with 9 catches for 128 yards and 2 touchdowns in 7 games. Against Boise St, the #9 team in the country, Hardy scored an 81 yard touchdown on the first play of the game. At the end of the season, he was awarded a full-ride scholarship.

In 2009, Hardy had a breakout season with 39 catches for 691 yards and 3 touchdowns in 12 games. During his senior year in 2010, Hardy had 32 catches for 545 and 1 touchdown in 8 games of the 2010 season. Up until a broken arm sidelined him for the final 5 games of the year, he was leading the nation in receiving yards for tight ends. He was a semi-finalist for the John Mackey award, given to the nations top college football tight end.

Hardy finished his college career with 80 catches for 1,364 yards and 6 touchdowns over 27 games.

== Professional career ==
Pre-draft measurables
Height	Weight	Arm length	Hand span	Wingspan	40-yard dash	10-yard split	20-yard split	20-yard shuttle	Three-cone drill	Vertical jump	Broad jump	Bench press
6 ft 3 3/4 in (1.92 m)	249 lb (113 kg)	31 3/4 in (0.81 m)	10 in (0.25 m)	6 ft 4 3/4 in (1.95 m)	4.78 s	1.62 s	2.78 s	4.35 s	7.19 s	30.5 in (0.77 m)	8 ft 10 in (2.69 m)	18 reps
All values from NFL Combine/Pro Day

=== Tampa Bay Buccaneers ===
Hardy was selected by the Tampa Bay Buccaneers in the seventh round of the 2011 NFL draft with the 238th overall pick. He was cut on September 3, 2011. He was re-signed to the practice squad 2 days later but was released on September 6, 2011.

=== New Orleans Saints ===
Hardy was signed to the New Orleans Saints practice squad on November 22, 2011. He was with the team through the 2012 playoffs, for a total of 8 weeks.

=== Minnesota Vikings ===
Hardy signed a futures contract with the Minnesota Vikings on January 19, 2012. After tearing cartilage in his right knee, he was released on May 2, 2012.

== Personal life ==
After rehabbing his knee for a year and a half, he had one last workout with the Carolina Panthers. After not being signed, Hardy decided to walk away from the game and retired at age 25.

Hardy now lives in Redding, California, with his wife, Mariah Van Horne. They were married September 2, 2017 in Kennewick, Washington. After serving as a family pastor at Fellowship Monrovia in Monrovia, California, he moved to Redding, CA where he eventually found another passion after football in the theater.

In the fall of 2021, he attended Bethel Conservatory of the Arts in Redding, CA, where he was privileged to play a range of characters from Macbeth in William Shakespeare’s renowned play of the same name, Torvald in A Doll’s House, and Francis Nurse in a production of Arthur Miller’s The Crucible.

After finishing a year at the Conservatory, Daniel played in 3 local theater productions. Marcellus, in Shakespeare’s Hamlet, Eddie Carbone in Sister Act the Musical, and the lead role as Prospero in Shakespeare’s the Tempest. He also performed in 2 commercials, 2 short films and a TV pilot.

In the summer of 2024, Daniel attended the double award-winning Identity School of Acting in LA, continuing to grow his craft.

In 2023, Daniel’s wife Mariah launched a Production Company alongside their friend Kelcy Swanstrum, called Mischief Story House. They developed an original Christmas musical called “Immanuel: A Christmas Story”. Daniel played the lead, Joseph, in the 2nd year it ran.

He continues to develop his skills as an actor while also training others on health and physical fitness in Redding, CA.
