= 2010 Maaco Bowl Las Vegas =

- 19th Las Vegas Bowl
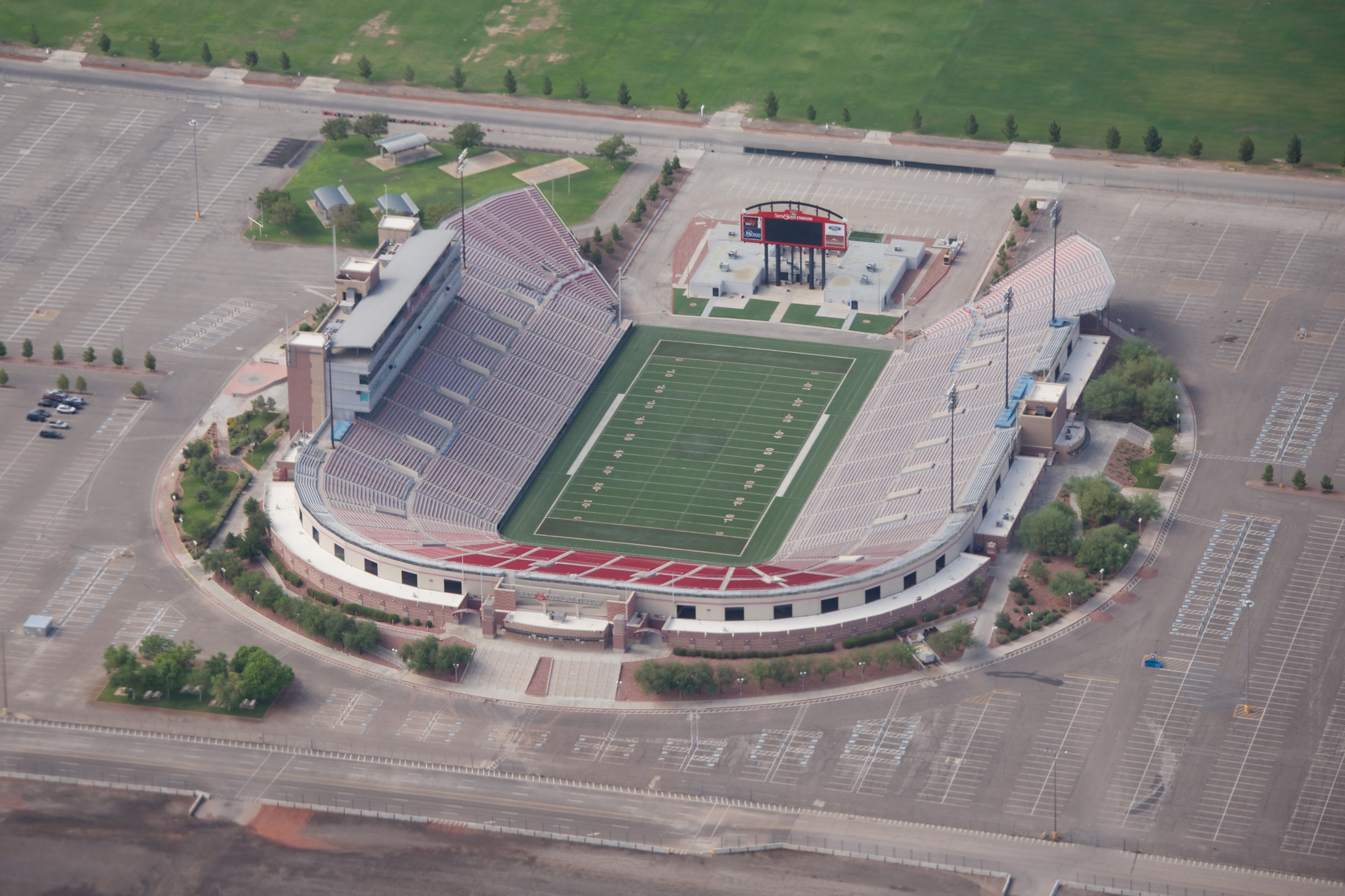
- Sam Boyd Stadium in Whitney, Nevada, hosted the Las Vegas Bowl.
Utah Utes	Boise State Broncos
(10–2)	(11–1)
Mountain West	WAC
3	26
Head coach: Kyle Whittingham	Head coach: Chris Petersen
AP / Coaches / BCS; 20 / 19 / 19	AP / Coaches / BCS; 10 / 10 / 10
	1	2	3	4	Total
Utah	3	0	0	0	3
Boise State	0	16	7	3	26
- Date: December 22, 2010
- Season: 2010
- Stadium: Sam Boyd Stadium
- Location: Whitney, Nevada
- MVP: QB Kellen Moore, Boise State
- Favorite: Boise St. by 16.5
- National anthem: Boyz II Men
- Referee: Jack Folliard (Pac-10)
- Attendance: 41,923
- Payout: US$1 million

United States TV coverage
- Network: ESPN
- Announcers: Brent Musburger (play-by-play); Kirk Herbstreit (color); Tom Rinaldi (sideline)
- Nielsen ratings: 3.3 / 5.36M

The 2010 Maaco Bowl Las Vegas was an NCAA-sanctioned Division I FBS post-season college football bowl game. The game was played Wednesday, December 22, 2010, at 5 p.m. PST at 40,000-seat Sam Boyd Stadium near Las Vegas, broadcast on ESPN. The game featured Utah against Boise State.

== Teams ==
=== Utah Utes ===
Utah was one of the teams participating in the 2010 bowl. The Utes entered the game with the longest current bowl winning streak at nine games and had never lost a bowl game under current head coach Kyle Whittingham. Utah entered the game with a 10–2 overall record and a #19 ranking in the BCS poll. The Utes had played in the Las Vegas bowl twice before, defeating Fresno State 17–16 in 1999 and beating USC 10–6 in 2001. The 1999 victory over Fresno State started the nine game bowl winning streak.

=== Boise State Broncos ===
Boise State was invited to the bowl after not enough Pac-10 teams were bowl-eligible to meet their contractual requirements. The #10 (BCS) Broncos entered the game with an 11–1 record, their only loss coming at Nevada on November 26; BSU split the WAC title with Nevada and Hawai'i. Before the Nevada game, they were in line for a possible at-large selection to a BCS bowl game. Even at 11–1, they were still eligible as an at-large selection but were not taken. The 2010 game marked BSU's first Maaco Bowl Las Vegas appearance. The Broncos entered with an all-time bowl record of 6–4; in their last bowl appearance, they defeated TCU in the 2010 Fiesta Bowl.

== Game summary ==
=== Scoring ===
Scoring Play	Score
1st Quarter
UTAH - Joe Phillips 44-yard kick, 0:56	UTAH 3–0
2nd Quarter
BSU - Doug Martin 84-yard run (Kyle Brotzman kick), 8:39	BSU 7–3
BSU - Kyle Brotzman 29-yard kick, 2:27	BSU 10–3
BSU - Kellen Moore 25-yard pass to Tyler Shoemaker (Two-point conversion failed), 0:18	BSU 16–3
3rd Quarter
BSU - Kellen Moore 18-yard pass to Austin Pettis (Kyle Brotzman kick), 8:18	BSU 23–3
4th Quarter
BSU - Kyle Brotzman 21-yard kick, 8:49	BSU 26–3

=== Statistics ===
Statistics	Utah	Boise State
First downs	8	23
Total offense, plays-yards	53-198	77-543
Rushes-yards (net)	29-107	37-202
Passes, Comp-Att-Yds	10-24-91	29-40-341
Fumbles-Interceptions	3-0	3-1
Time of Possession	23:32	33:15

== Game notes ==
The two schools, which have been considered among the best non-AQ programs in the Football Bowl Subdivision, had previously met on six occasions. Boise State held a 4–2 advantage in prior matchups. The previous meeting between the two schools was a 36–3 win by the Broncos in 2006. That matchup was played in Salt Lake City. The Maaco Bowl Las Vegas marked the first time that the programs met in a bowl game.

Utah left the Mountain West Conference for the Pac-12 Conference after the season, while Boise State joined the MWC from the Western Athletic Conference.
