= 2010 Boise State Broncos football team =

American college football season

2010 Boise State Broncos football

WAC co-champion Maaco Bowl Las Vegas champion

Maaco Bowl Las Vegas, W 26–3 vs. Utah
- Conference: Western Athletic Conference

Ranking
- Coaches: No. 7
- AP: No. 9
- Record: 12–1 (7–1 WAC)
- Head coach: Chris Petersen (5th season)
- Offensive coordinator: Bryan Harsin (5th season)
- Offensive scheme: Multiple
- Defensive coordinator: Pete Kwiatkowski (1st season)
- Base defense: 4–2–5
- Home stadium: Bronco Stadium

2010 Western Athletic Conference football standings
	Conf.			Overall
Team	W		L	W		L
No. 11 Nevada +	7	–	1	13	–	1
No. 9 Boise State +	7	–	1	12	–	1
Hawaii +	7	–	1	10	–	4
Fresno State	5	–	3	8	–	5
Louisiana Tech	4	–	4	5	–	7
Idaho	3	–	5	6	–	7
Utah State	2	–	6	4	–	8
New Mexico State	1	–	7	2	–	10
San Jose State	0	–	8	1	–	12
+ – Conference co-champions; Rankings from AP Poll

The 2010 Boise State Broncos football team represented Boise State University in the 2010 NCAA Division I FBS football season. The Broncos were led by fifth-year head coach Chris Petersen and played their home games at Bronco Stadium. They entered the 2010 season with winning streaks of 14 games overall and 25 games in regular-season play. This was the Broncos' final season as a member of the Western Athletic Conference, as the school announced on June 11, 2010, that it would leave the WAC for the Mountain West Conference effective July 1, 2011.

The Broncos finished the season 12–1, 7–1 in WAC play to claim a share of the WAC title with Nevada and Hawaii. The title was their third straight and eighth in the last nine years. They were invited to the Maaco Bowl Las Vegas where they defeated Utah 26–3.

== Recruiting ==
College recruiting
Name	Hometown	School	Height	Weight	40^{‡}	Commit date
Tyrone Crawford; DE	Bakersfield, California	Bakersfield C.C.	6 ft 5 in (1.96 m)	258 lb (117 kg)	–	Sep 8, 2009
Tyrone Crawford; DE	Recruit ratings: Scout: Rivals: (NR)					
Bryan Douglas; DB	Harbor City, California	Narbonne H.S.	5 ft 10 in (1.78 m)	165 lb (75 kg)	4.6	Jul 12, 2009
Bryan Douglas; DB	Recruit ratings: Scout: Rivals: (73)					
Grant Hedrick; QB	Independence, Oregon	Central H.S.	6 ft 1 in (1.85 m)	180 lb (82 kg)	–	Jun 22, 2009
Grant Hedrick; QB	Recruit ratings: Scout: Rivals: (67)					
Tyler Horn; DE	Meridian, Idaho	Mountain View H.S.	6 ft 4 in (1.93 m)	230 lb (100 kg)	–	Jan 14, 2010
Tyler Horn; DE	Recruit ratings: Scout: Rivals: (40)					
Holden Huff; TE	Rocklin, California	Rocklin H.S.	6 ft 5 in (1.96 m)	205 lb (93 kg)	–	Jan 29, 2010
Holden Huff; TE	Recruit ratings: Scout: Rivals: (40)					
Jeremy Ioane; DB	Honolulu, Hawaii	Punahou School	5 ft 11 in (1.80 m)	190 lb (86 kg)	–	Feb 3, 2010
Jeremy Ioane; DB	Recruit ratings: Scout: Rivals: (40)					
Darren Lee; LB	Susanville, California	Lassen H.S.	6 ft 2 in (1.88 m)	203 lb (92 kg)	–	Feb 3, 2010
Darren Lee; LB	Recruit ratings: Scout: Rivals: (40)					
Matt Miller; ATH	Helena, Montana	Helena Capital H.S.	6 ft 4 in (1.93 m)	205 lb (93 kg)	4.5	Dec 29, 2009
Matt Miller; ATH	Recruit ratings: Scout: Rivals: (76)					
Kyle Sosnowski; DB	Boise, Idaho	Capital H.S.	6 ft 3 in (1.91 m)	203 lb (92 kg)	4.8	Jul 30, 2009
Kyle Sosnowski; DB	Recruit ratings: Scout: Rivals: (40)					
Troy Ware; WR	Vista, California	Vista H.S.	6 ft 1 in (1.85 m)	164 lb (74 kg)	4.6	Oct 12, 2009
Troy Ware; WR	Recruit ratings: Scout: Rivals: (76)					
Overall recruit ranking: Scout: 97 Rivals: 82 ESPN: –
Note: In many cases, Scout, Rivals, 247Sports, On3, and ESPN may conflict in their listings of height and weight.; In these cases, the average was taken. ESPN grades are on a 100-point scale.; Sources: "Boise State Football Commitments". Rivals.; "2010 Boise State Football Commits". Scout.; "ESPN". ESPN.; "Scout.com Team Recruiting Rankings". Scout.; "2010 Team Ranking". Rivals.com.

== Pre-season ==
Expectations for this season's team were arguably the highest in the program's history. The Broncos returned 23 of the 24 players who started in their 2010 Fiesta Bowl win over TCU. The only loss was cornerback Kyle Wilson, who was selected in the first round of the NFL draft by the New York Jets. Before the season, the Broncos were in the top 5 of most publications' early top 25 rankings, including #2 by Mark Schlabach of ESPN and Lindy's. In both polls they were only ranked behind defending BCS National Champions Alabama.

=== Award Watch lists ===
Jeremy Avery Sr. RB – Doak Walker Award.

Kyle Brotzman Sr. PK – Lou Groza Award.

Jeron Johnson Sr. DB – Lott Trophy, Jim Thorpe Award.

Doug Martin Jr. RB – Paul Hornung Award.

Kellen Moore Jr. QB – Davey O'Brien Award, Manning Award, Walter Camp Award, Maxwell Award.

Austin Pettis Sr. WR – Biletnikoff Award.

Nate Potter Jr. OL – Rotary Lombardi Award, Outland Trophy.

Ryan Winterswyk Sr. DE – Rotary Lombardi Award, Bronko Nagurski Award, Chuck Bednarik Award.

Titus Young Sr. WR – Biletnikoff Award.

=== All–American lists ===
Jeron Johnson Sr. DB – Sporting News 3rd team, Nationalchamps.net 3rd team.

Kellen Moore Jr. QB – Sporting News 2nd team, Nationalchamps.net 1st team.

Austin Pettis Sr. WR – Nationalchamps.net 3rd team.

Billy Winn Jr. DE – Nationalchamps.net honorable mention.

Ryan Winterswyk Sr. DE – Nationalchamps.net honorable mention.

Titus Young Sr. WR – Nationalchamps.net 3rd team as kick returner, honorable mention as wide receiver.

=== WAC media days ===
During the WAC's football preview on July 26 in Salt Lake City, Utah, the Broncos were selected by both the coaches and media as favorites to win the conference. They received 42 of a possible 43 first-place votes in the media poll, with Nevada coming in second and receiving the other first-place vote. They were effectively the unanimous choice in the coaches' poll, receiving all eight of the possible first-place votes; because conference rules prohibit coaches from voting for their own teams, Chris Petersen gave Nevada his first-place vote.

Kellen Moore was selected as the preseason offensive player of the year.

==== Media poll ====
1. Boise State – 386 (42)
2. Nevada – 333 (1)
3. Fresno State – 300
4. Idaho – 207
5. Louisiana Tech – 200
6. Utah State – 196
7. Hawaii – 166
8. New Mexico State – 81
9. San Jose State – 66

==== Coaches poll ====
1. Boise State – 64 (8)
2. Nevada – 55 (1)
3. Fresno State – 50
4. Utah State – 37
5. Hawaii – 36
6. Idaho – 33
7. Louisiana Tech – 26
8. New Mexico State – 14
9. San Jose State – 9

=== Pre-season Top 25 polls ===
On August 6 Boise State received 1,215 points to rank 5th in the USA Today preseason poll, one spot ahead their season opening opponent, Virginia Tech. The Broncos were the highest rated non BCS conference school.

On August 21, Boise State received 1,336 points to rank 3rd in the Associated Press preseason. They also received one first place vote from Joe Giglio of The Times & Observer in Raleigh, North Carolina. Just as they were in the Coaches poll, the Broncos were the highest rated non-BCS conference school and the ranking is the highest ranking in any poll in school history.

The Broncos' rankings were by far the highest preseason rankings ever for a non BCS conference school as the previous high to start a season was 14th in the AP poll, also achieved by Boise State in 2009.

== Schedule ==
Date	Time	Opponent	Rank	Site	TV	Result	Attendance
September 6	6:00 p.m.	vs. No. 10 Virginia Tech*	No. 3	FedExField; Landover, MD (Allstate Kickoff in the Capital)	ESPN/ESPN 3D	W 33–30	86,587
September 18	6:00 p.m.	at Wyoming*	No. 3	War Memorial Stadium; Laramie, WY	CBSCS	W 51–6	29,014
September 25	6:00 p.m.	No. 24 Oregon State*	No. 3	Bronco Stadium; Boise, ID (College GameDay)	ABC	W 37–24	34,137^{A}
October 2	6:00 p.m.	at New Mexico State	No. 3	Aggie Memorial Stadium; Las Cruces, NM	KTVB	W 59–0	19,661
October 9	6:00 p.m.	Toledo*^{†}	No. 4	Bronco Stadium; Boise, ID	KTVB	W 57–14	33,833
October 16	6:00 p.m.	at San Jose State	No. 3	Spartan Stadium; San Jose, CA	KTVB	W 48–0	20,239
October 26	6:00 p.m.	Louisiana Tech	No. 2	Bronco Stadium; Boise, ID	ESPN2	W 49–20	32,026
November 6	1:30 p.m.	Hawaii	No. 2	Bronco Stadium; Boise, ID	ESPNU/ESPN 3D	W 42–7	34,060
November 12	7:00 p.m.	at Idaho	No. 4	Kibbie Dome; Moscow, ID (Battle for the Governor's Trophy)	ESPN2/ESPN 3D	W 52–14	16,453
November 19	7:30 p.m.	Fresno State	No. 3	Bronco Stadium; Boise, ID (Battle for the Milk Can)	ESPN2	W 51–0	33,454
November 26	8:15 p.m.	at No. 19 Nevada	No. 3	Mackay Stadium; Reno, NV (rivalry)	ESPN	L 31–34 ^{OT}	30,712
December 4	1:00 p.m.	Utah State	No. 9	Bronco Stadium; Boise, ID	KTVB	W 50–14	32,101
December 22	6:00 p.m.	vs. No. 20 Utah*	No. 10	Sam Boyd Stadium; Whitney, NV (Maaco Bowl Las Vegas)	ESPN	W 26–3	41,923
*Non-conference game; ^{†}Homecoming; Rankings from AP Poll released prior to the game; All times are in Mountain time

- ^ADenotes the largest crowd in Bronco Stadium history to date. Previous high was 34,127 vs Oregon in 2009. The record was broken on October 22, 2011, vs Air Force with 34,196.

== Game results ==
=== Virginia Tech ===
	1	2	3	4	Total
#5 Broncos	17	3	6	7	33
#6 Hokies	0	14	13	3	30

First ever meeting.

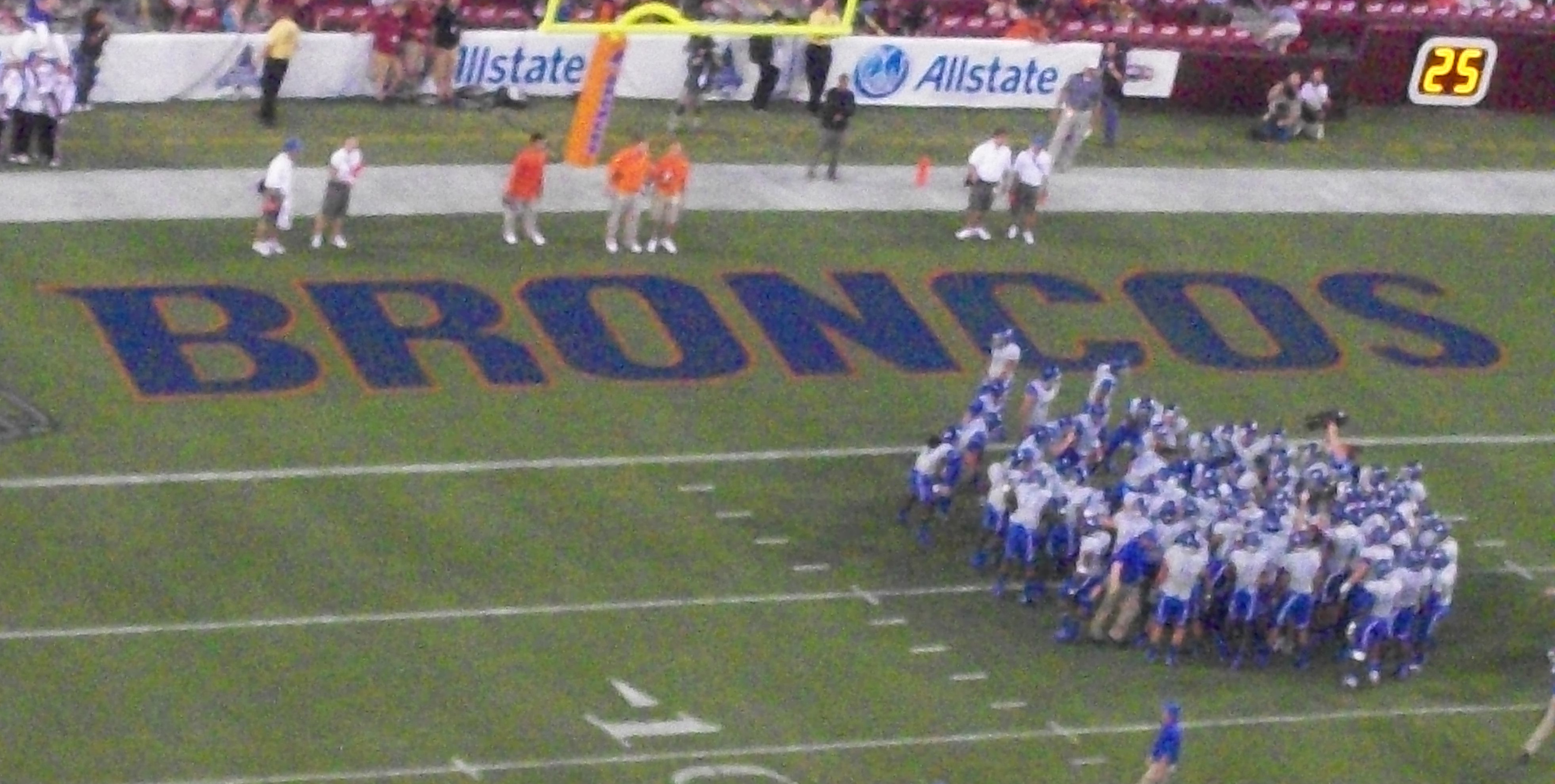
Boise State players during pregame.

Boise State started fast, gave up the lead, and scored in the last two minutes of the game to pull off a win over #6 Virginia Tech in one of the premier matchups of college football's opening weekend. The Broncos recovered a fumble on Tech's second snap of the game which led to a 44-yard Kyle Brotzman FG. Austin Pettis blocked a punt on Tech's next possession then caught an 8-yard TD pass from Kellen Moore 2 plays later to put the Broncos up 10–0. The Broncos extended their lead to 17–0 on their next possession on a diving 2-yard TD catch by Tommy Gallarda. The Hokies countered with 2 TD's in the second quarter while Kyle Brotzman added a 47-yard FG to make the score 20–14 at halftime. Virginia Tech opened the scoring in the second half on Ryan Williams second 1-yard TD run to give the Hokies a 21–20 lead. The Broncos answered quickly on their next possession with a D.J. Harper 71-yard TD run. The PAT would be blocked for a 26–21 Broncos lead. On the ensuing possession, the Broncos forced the Hokies to attempt a 51-yard field goal, which they missed badly. However, the Broncos were called for running into the kicker, gave the Hokies a 4th and 5 situation where they went for it and scored on a 28-yard TD pass yet failed on the 2-point conversion. A 34-yard Hokie FG put them up by 4 late in the fourth. The Broncos got the ball back with 1:47 left and no timeouts, needing a TD to take the lead. The Broncos would march the field in only 38 seconds, with the help of a personal foul penalty, and finished the game-winning drive with a 13-yard TD pass from Moore to Pettis, their second connection of the game, to bring the final score to 33–30.

Passing Leaders	Rushing Leaders	Receiving Leaders	Total Yards
Kellen Moore: 23/38, 215 YDS, 3 TDS	Doug Martin: 12 CAR, 83 YDS, LG of 23	Austin Pettis: 6 REC, 73 YDS, 2 TDS, LG of 16	BSU: 383
	D.J. Harper: 4 CAR, 80 YDS, 1 TD, LG of 71	Titus Young: 6 REC, 80 YDS, LG of 28	VT: 314

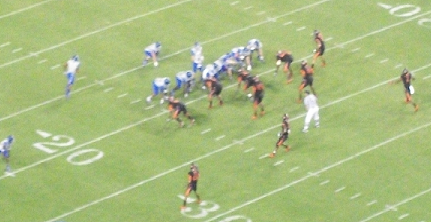
Boise State on offense.

1st Quarter

- 12:44 BSU–Kyle Brotzman 44 YD FG 3–0
- 09:48 BSU–Austin Pettis 8 YD Pass From Kellen Moore (Kyle Brotzman Kick) 10–0
- 01:11 BSU–Tommy Gallarda 2 YD Pass From Kellen Moore (Kyle Brotzman Kick) 17–0

2nd Quarter

- 11:44 VT–Ryan Williams 1 YD Run (Chris Hazley Kick) 17–7
- 10:23 BSU–Kyle Brotzman 47 YD FG 20–7
- 00:57 VT–Ryan Williams 12 YD Pass from Tyrod Taylor (Chris Hazley Kick) 20–14

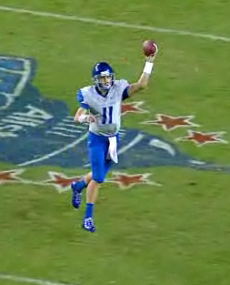
Kellen Moore was named WAC Offensive Player of the Week and Davey O'Brien Award Quarterback of the Week.

3rd Quarter

- 06:34 VT–Ryan Williams 1 YD Run (Chris Hazley Kick) 20–21
- 05:38 BSU–D.J. Harper 71 YD Run (PAT Blocked) 26–21
- 02:40 VT–Jarrett Boykin 28 YD Pass from Tyrod Taylor (Two-Point Conversion Failed) 26–27

4th Quarter

- 07:38 VT–Chris Hazley 34 YD FG 26–30
- 01:09 BSU–Austin Pettis 13 YD Pass from Kellen Moore (Kyle Brotzman Kick) 33–30

Boise State remained at #3 in the AP poll but did gain 7 more first place votes to now have 8. They moved up to #3 in the coaches poll. They were named the Tostitos Fiesta Bowl National Team of the Week and quarterback Kellen Moore was named the Davey O'Brien Award Quarterback of the Week. Moore and kicker Kyle Brotzman were named the WAC offensive and special teams players of the week, respectively. During their bye week they lost 7 first place votes in the AP poll, but did remain at #3 in both polls.

=== Wyoming ===
	1	2	3	4	Total
#3 Broncos	17	17	10	7	51
Cowboys	0	0	6	0	6

5th meeting. 4–0 all time. Last meeting 2007, 24–14 Bronco win in Boise. With Boise State joining the Mountain West in 2011, the Cowboys' scheduled non conference game in Boise in 2011 will become a conference game.

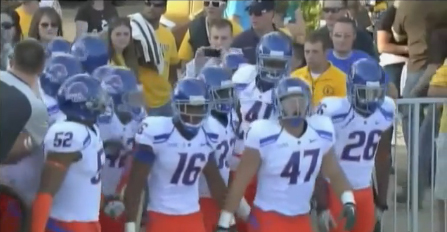
Boise State team about to take the field

Boise State's last trip to Laramie in 2006 saw the Broncos walk away with a hard-fought 17–10 win. This game, however, would never be in doubt as the Broncos scored early and often on their way to a 51–6 win over their future Mountain West Conference counterparts. After an early Kyle Brotzman field goal, Shea McClellin fell on a bad Wyoming snap in the end zone for the Bronco defense's first touchdown of the season and a 10–0 lead. The Broncos next offensive possession only took 4 plays to go 93 yards and finished with a flea-flicker 58-yard touchdown pass from Kellen Moore to Austin Pettis. After Doug Martin's first rushing touchdown of the season, Kellen Moore would find Titus Young for a 49-yard touchdown reception. Another Brotzman field goal brought the score to 34–0 at halftime. The offense added another 17 points after halftime with Brotzman's third field goal, a 2-yard D.J. Harper touchdown run, and an 11-yard Jarvis Hodge touchdown run. Kellen Moore finished 20/30 for 370 yards, 2 TD's and 1 interception. Hunter White and Jeron Johnson recorded the Bronco's first interceptions of the season. The Broncos out gained Wyoming 648 to 135 total yards and held the Cowboy rushing game to −21 yards with the help of 4 sacks. Since the formation of the Mountain West Conference in 1999, Boise State has never lost a regular season game to a Mountain West team (their only loss to a Mountain West school was against TCU in the 2008 Poinsettia Bowl).

Passing Leaders	Rushing Leaders	Receiving Leaders	Total Yards
Kellen Moore: 22/30, 370 YDS, 2 TDS, 1 INT	Doug Martin: 17 CAR, 105 YDS, 1 TD, LG of 15	Titus Young: 4 REC, 94 YDS, 1 TD, LG of 49	BSU: 648
	D.J. Harper: 11 CAR, 59 YDS, 1 TD, LG of 11	Austin Pettis: 3 REC, 88 YDS, 1 TD, LG of 58	WYO: 135

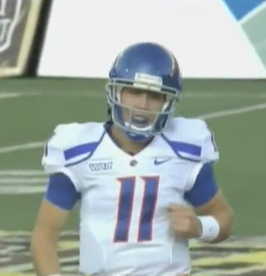
Despite throwing an interception, Kellen Moore had a good game throwing for 370 yards and 2 TDs

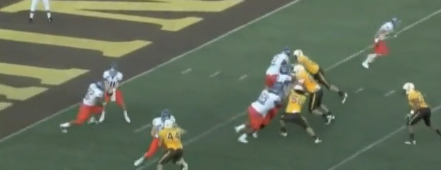
The Broncos offense had 648 total yards

1st Quarter

- 09:54 BSU–Kyle Brotzman 24 YD FG 3–0
- 08:30 BSU–Shea McClellin Recovered Fumble In End Zone (Kyle Brotzman Kick) 10–0
- 05:42 BSU–Austin Pettis 58 YD Pass From Kellen Moore (Kyle Brotzman Kick) 17–0

2nd Quarter

- 13:28 BSU–Doug Martin 7 YD Run (Kyle Brotzman Kick) 24–0
- 11:41 BSU–Titus Young 49 YD Pass From Kellen Moore (Kyle Brotzman Kick) 31–0
- 00:00 BSU–Kyle Brotzman 29 YD FG 34–0

3rd Quarter

- 09:00 BSU–Kyle Brotzman 38 YD FG 37–0
- 06:21 WYO–Greg Saydjari 35 YD Pass From Austyn Carta-Samuels (Pat Failed) 37–6
- 00:14 BSU–D.J. Harper 2 YD Run (Jimmy Pavel Kick) 44–6

4th Quarter

- 00:57 BSU–Jarvis Hodge 11 YD Run (Jimmy Pavel Kick) 51–6

The convincing win helped the Broncos remain at #3 in both major polls and to keep their one first place vote in the AP Poll.

=== Oregon State ===
	1	2	3	4	Total
Beavers	7	3	14	0	24
#3 Broncos	7	17	7	6	37

7th meeting. 2–4 all time. Last meeting 2006, 42–14 Bronco win in Boise. The Broncos will return to Corvallis in 2016.

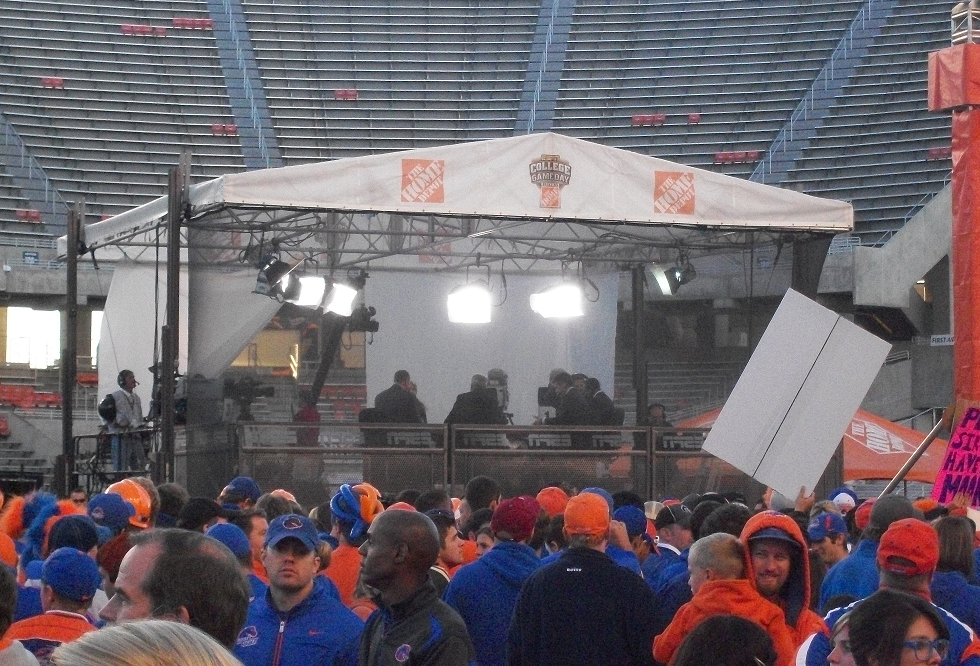
Boise State fans and the GameDay set inside of Bronco Stadium

ESPN's College GameDay broadcast from Bronco Stadium. This was the first time that College Gameday broadcast from a Western Athletic Conference School. The game was broadcast nationwide on ABC, the first ever national network television broadcast of a regular season game in school history.

13,205 fans showed up before sunrise to watch ESPN's College GameDay live from inside Bronco Stadium and 34,137 showed up 11 hours later to break a Bronco Stadium attendance record and see the Broncos extend their winning streak to 17 games with a 37–24 win over Oregon State of the Pac-10. The Broncos went to their bag of tricks for their first score as Austin Pettis took a reverse pitch from QB Kellen Moore and threw a 6-yard touchdown pass to TE Tommy Gallarda. Oregon State tied the game on a 54-yard punt return for a touchdown by James Rodgers. After a Kyle Brotzman field goal, Kellen Moore found Austin Pettis for a 17-yard touchdown to bring the score to 17–7. After an Oregon State field goal, Moore then found Titus Young on a 49-yard touchdown where Young was so wide open that he backed into the endzone for a 24–10 halftime lead. Two personal foul penalties on the Bronco defense helped lead to Oregon State's first touchdown of the second half, but the Broncos offense answered just 2:51 later on Moore's third touchdown pass of 21 yards to Tyler Shoemaker. Oregon State kept the Bronco lead to just 7 with another touchdown when they fumbled in their own endzone but recovered. Another Brotzman field goal pushed the lead back to 10. Boise State got the ball back with 9:31 left to play and ran running back Doug Martin on 8 of the first 9 plays during an 11-play, 67-yard drive that ate up 7:17 off the clock and led to another Bronco field goal. The Bronco defense had 4 sacks on the night, including 2 on back-to-back plays on the Beavers' opening possession. Titus Young now leads the nation in all-purpose yards per game with 208.0 and Kyle Brotzman leads the nation in field goals per game with 2.67 a game.

Passing Leaders	Rushing Leaders	Receiving Leaders	Total Yards
Kellen Moore: 19/27, 288 YDS, 3 TDS	Doug Martin: 19 CAR, 138 YDS, LG of 55	Titus Young: 5 REC, 136 YDS, 1 TD, LG of 49	BSU: 469
Austin Pettis: 1/1, 6 YDS, 1 TD	D.J. Harper: 3 CAR, 21 YDS, LG of 9	Austin Pettis: 4 REC, 62 YDS, 1 TD, LG of 26	ORST: 237

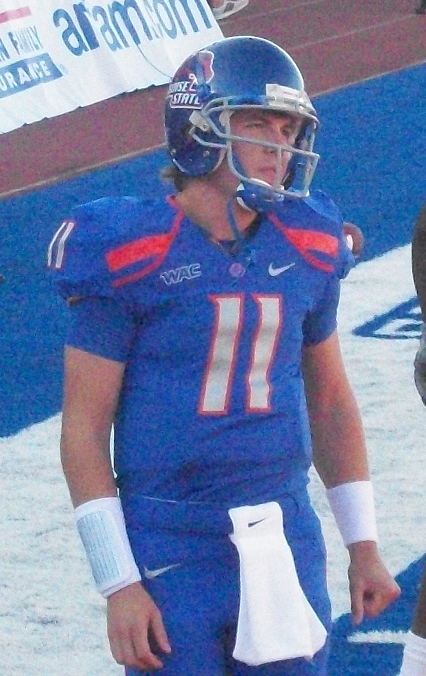
Kellen Moore was named WAC Offensive Player of the Week.

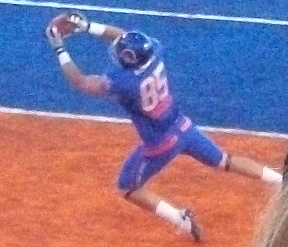
Tommy Gallarda catching BSU's first TD.

1st Quarter

- 10:15 BSU–Tommy Gallarda 6 YD Pass From Austin Pettis (Kyle Brotzman Kick) 0–7
- 04:12 ORST–James Rodgers 54 YD Punt Return (Justin Kahut Kick) 7–7

2nd Quarter

- 13:39 BSU–Kyle Brotzman 21 YD FG 7–10
- 08:10 BSU–Austin Pettis 17 YD Pass From Kellen Moore (Kyle Brotzman Kick) 7–17
- 06:08 ORST–Justin Kahut 41 YD FG 10–17
- 03:30 BSU–Titus Young 49 YD Pass From Kellen Moore (Kyle Brotzman Kick) 10–24

3rd Quarter

- 05:28 ORST–Jacquizz Rodgers 4 YD Run (Justin Kahut Kick) 17–24
- 02:37 BSU–Tyler Shoemaker 21 YD Pass From Kellen Moore (Kyle Brotzman Kick) 17–31
- 00:42 ORST–Joe Halahuni 0 YD Pass From Ryan Katz (Justin Kahut Kick) 24–31

4th Quarter

- 12:27 BSU–Kyle Brotzman 33 YD FG 24–34
- 02:14 BSU–Kyle Brotzman 30 YD FG 24–37

Kellen Moore was named WAC Player of the Week for the second time this season after going 19 of 27 for 288 yards and 3 touchdowns. The Broncos once again stayed at #3 in both major polls and still have 1 first place vote in the AP poll.

RB D.J. Harper, who in the 3rd game of the year in 2009 tore his ACL and missed the rest of the season, again tore the same ACL and will miss the rest of the season.

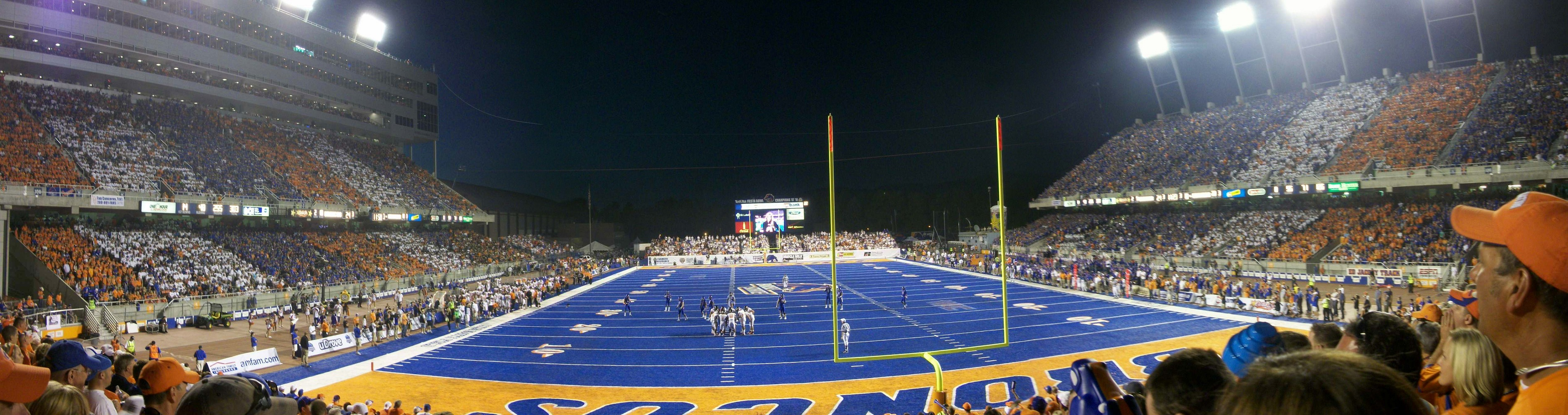
Panoramic view from the south endzone with a record attendance of 34,137.

=== New Mexico State ===
	1	2	3	4	Total
#3 Broncos	24	14	14	7	59
Aggies	0	0	0	0	0

11th meeting. 10–0 all time. Last meeting 2009, 42–7 Bronco win in Boise. With Boise State leaving the WAC, they are not currently scheduled to play each other again.

Boise State stayed undefeated all time against the Aggies of New Mexico State with a dominating 59–0 win. The scores came early and often for the Broncos as they scored 24 first quarter points on a Kyle Brotzman field goal and 3 rushing touchdowns (backup QB Mike Coughlin-15 yards, RB Doug Martin 1 yard, RB Jeremy Avery 18 yards). Kellen Moore added 2 2nd-quarter touchdown passes to Kyle Efaw (41 yards) and Doug Martin (28 yards) for a 38–0 halftime lead. Moore connected with Efaw again early in the 3rd quarter for a 26-yard touchdown. Backup QB Joe Southwick would take over for Moore and throw a 78-yard touchdown to Chris Potter for Southwick and Potter's first career touchdown. Jarvis Hodge's 54-yard touchdown run late in the game was his second touchdown on the season. Boise State recovered 2 fumbles and Ryan Winterswyk had an interception. Since New Mexico State joined the WAC in 2005, the Broncos have outscored the Aggies 304–41 in 6 meetings and have shutout the Aggies 3 of the last 4 years.

Passing Leaders	Rushing Leaders	Receiving Leaders	Total Yards
Kellen Moore: 13/18, 196 YDS, 3 TDS	Doug Martin: 10 CAR, 94 YDS, 1 TD, LG of 36	Kyle Efaw: 2 REC, 67 YDS, 2 TD, LG of 41	BSU: 608
Joe Southwick: 4/5, 102 YDS, 1 TD	Jeremy Avery: 8 CAR, 69 YDS, 1 TD, LG of 18	Titus Young: 5 REC, 69 YDS, LG of 17	NMSU: 208

1st Quarter

- 11:13 BSU–Mike Coughlin 15 YD Run (Kyle Brotzman Kick) 7–0
- 08:16 BSU–Doug Martin 1 YD Run (Kyle Brotzman Kick) 14–0
- 04:56 BSU–Kyle Brotzman 35 YD FG 17–0
- 02:19 BSU–Jeremy Avery 18 YD Run (Kyle Brotzman Kick) 24–0

2nd Quarter

- 14:52 BSU–Kyle Efaw 41 YD Pass From Kellen Moore (Kyle Brotzman Kick) 31–0
- 04:22 BSU–Doug Martin 28 YD Pass From Kellen Moore (Kyle Brotzman Kick) 38–0

3rd Quarter

- 12:45 BSU–Kyle Efaw 26 YD Pass From Kellen Moore (Kyle Brotzman Kick) 45–0
- 02:00 BSU–Chris Potter 78 YD Pass From Joe Southwick (Kyle Brotzman Kick) 52–0

4th Quarter

- 01:19 BSU–Jarvis Hodge 54 YD Run (Trevor Harman Kick) 59–0

Despite the dominating win, Boise State was jumped in both polls by Oregon, falling to #4. They still have 1 first place vote in the AP poll.

=== Toledo ===
First ever meeting. The Broncos will go to Toledo in 2011.

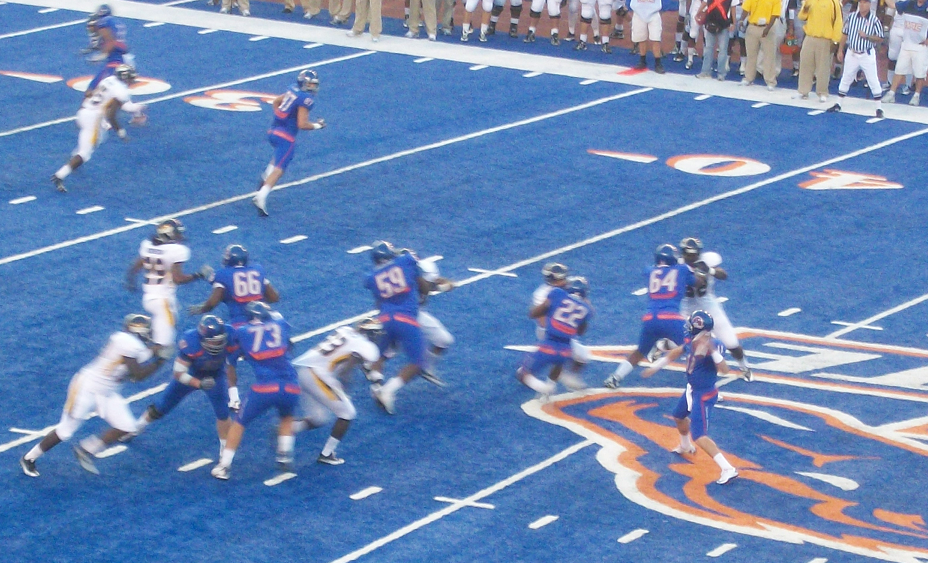
Boise State offense finished the game with 500 total yards.

	1	2	3	4	Total
Rockets	7	0	0	7	14
#4 Broncos	15	21	21	0	57

The Broncos turned five Toledo turnovers into 28 points en route to a 57–14 blowout for their 58th straight regular-season home win. Jeremy Avery ran for 3 first half touchdowns (4, 12, 5) and Kellen Moore threw for two first-half touchdowns (2 yards to Kyle Efaw, 51 yards to Titus Young) for a 36–7 halftime lead. On Toledo's first possession of the second half, Shea McClellin took an interception back 36 yards for his second defensive touchdown of the season. Moore added his third touchdown of the game on a 33-yard pass to Tyler Shoemaker. Matt Kaiserman's 1-yard touchdown run ended the Bronco's scoring. Kellen Moore's 3 touchdown passes puts him at 14 for the season to only one interception and has 3 touchdown passes in 4 of 5 games this season. Boise State's defense racked up 4 sacks, 2 by Billy Winn, and gave up less than 100 yards rushing for the third time this season. Cornerback Brandyn Thompson recovered a fumble and had an interception, the 10th of his career. With Alabama's loss to South Carolina, Boise State now has the nation's longest winning streak at 19 games.

Passing Leaders	Rushing Leaders	Receiving Leaders	Total Yards
Kellen Moore: 16/27, 267 YDS, 3 TDS	Doug Martin: 8 CAR, 56 YDS, LG of 29	Titus Young: 6 REC, 97 YDS, 1 TD, LG of 51	BSU: 500
	Jeremy Avery: 7 CAR, 42 YDS, 3 TDS, LG of 12	Austin Pettis: 4 REC, 81 YDS, LG of 28	TOL: 287

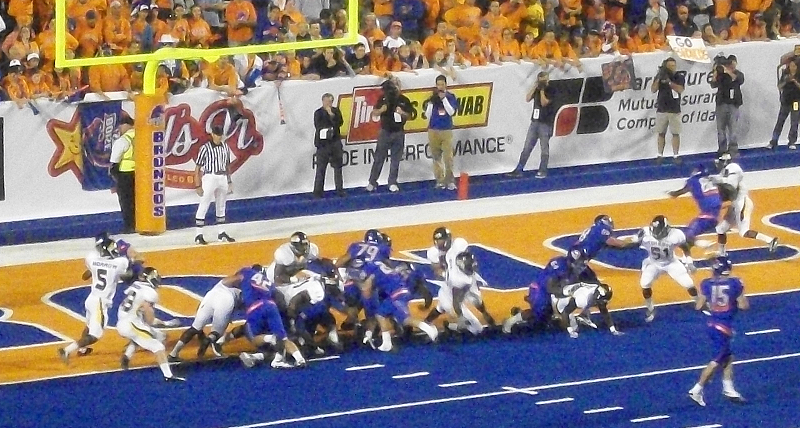
Matt Kaiserman scoring the Broncos final touchdown.

1st Quarter

- 12:47 BSU–Jeremy Avery 4 YD Run (Austin Pettis Run For Two-point conversion) 0–8
- 07:42 BSU–Kyle Efaw 2 YD Pass From Kellen Moore (Kyle Brotzman Kick) 0–15
- 04:41 TOL–Austin Dantin 4 YD Run (Bill Claus Kick) 7–15

2nd Quarter

- 14:29 BSU–Jeremy Avery 12 YD Run (Kyle Brotzman Kick) 7–22
- 03:38 BSU–Titus Young 51 YD Pass From Kellen Moore (Kyle Brotzman Kick) 7–29
- 00:30 BSU–Jeremy Avery 5 YD Run (Kyle Brotzman Kick) 7–36

3rd Quarter

- 12:51 BSU–Shea McClellin 36 YD Interception Return (Kyle Brotzman Kick) 7–43
- 07:21 BSU–Tyler Shoemaker 33 YD Pass From Kellen Moore (Kyle Brotzman Kick) 7–50
- 02:03 BSU–Matt Kaiserman 1 YD run (Kyle Brotzman kick) 7–57

4th Quarter

- 10:55 TOL–Danny Noble 7 YD pass from Terrance Owens (Bill Claus Kick) 14–57

The Broncos moved back to #3 in both polls with 8 first-place votes in the AP and 1 first place vote in the Coaches poll. They also debuted at #3 in the first Harris poll of the season and received 10 first-place votes.

=== San Jose State ===
	1	2	3	4	Total
#3 Broncos	21	20	7	0	48
Spartans	0	0	0	0	0

11th meeting. 10–0 all time. Last meeting 2009, 45–7 Bronco win in Boise. With Boise State leaving the WAC, they are not currently scheduled to play each other again.

Boise State only played their starters for the first half, but that was enough to dominate the depleted Spartans 48–0 to extend the nations longest winning streak to 20 games. Kellen Moore threw 2 touchdown passes of 17 and 43 yards while going 14 of 16 for 231 and now has 16 touchdowns to just 1 interception on the year. Titus Young added 2 touchdowns, one each receiving and rushing. Doug Martin ran for 2 touchdowns on only 8 carries. Aaron Tevis made a one handed interception in the second quarter and returned it 43 yards for a touchdown, the defenses 3rd TD of the season. The Broncos offensive reserves lost 2 fumbles in the second half. Punt returner Chris Potter returned 4 punts for 76 yards with a long of 33 in rout to being named WAC Special Teams Player of the Week. The Broncos held their second opponent this season to negative yards rushing (Wyoming being the other) and recorded 4 more sacks to now have 20 on the season. The Broncos outgained the Spartans, who started 7 freshman, 535 to 80.

Passing Leaders	Rushing Leaders	Receiving Leaders	Total Yards
Kellen Moore: 14/16, 231 YDS, 2 TDS	Doug Martin: 8 CAR, 68 YDS, 2 TDS, LG of 14	Titus Young: 7 REC, 105 YDS, 1 TD, LG of 43	BSU: 535
Joe Southwick: 8/13, 83 YDS	Matt Kaiserman: 15 CAR, 49 YDS, LG of 11	Austin Pettis: 3 REC, 53 YDS, LG of 24	SJSU: 80

1st Quarter

- 12:19 BSU–Doug Martin 6 YD Run (Kyle Brotzman Kick) 7–0
- 06:48 BSU–Tommy Gallarda 17 YD Pass From Kellen Moore (Kyle Brotzman Kick) 14–0
- 01:19 BSU–Titus Young 17 YD Run (Kyle Brotzman Kick) 21–0

2nd Quarter

- 05:16 BSU–Titus Young 43 YD Pass From Kellen Moore (Pat Failed) 27–0
- 04:14 BSU–Aaron Tevis 43 YD Interception Return (Kyle Brotzman Kick) 34–0
- 00:42 BSU–Jeremy Avery 2 YD Run (Kyle Brotzman Kick) 41–0

3rd Quarter

- 10:53 BSU–Doug Martin 4 YD Run (Trevor Harman Kick) 48–0

After #1 Ohio State's loss to #16 Wisconsin, Boise State rose to #2 in the three human polls and received 15 first place votes in the AP, 11 in the Coaches, and 29 in the Harris poll. The #2 ranking is the highest ranking in school history in any poll. The Broncos also debuted at #3 in the initial BCS poll of the season, their highest ranking ever in the BCS poll.

Following a bye week, the Broncos stayed at #2 in the human polls, but got fewer first place votes in all three (11 in the AP, 5 in the Coaches, 14 in the Harris). They did remain at #3 in the BCS poll.

=== Louisiana Tech ===
	1	2	3	4	Total
Bulldogs	7	0	6	7	20
#2 Broncos	14	14	14	7	49

13th meeting. 8–4 all time. Last meeting 2009, 45–35 Bronco win in Ruston. With Boise State leaving the WAC, they are not currently scheduled to play each other again.

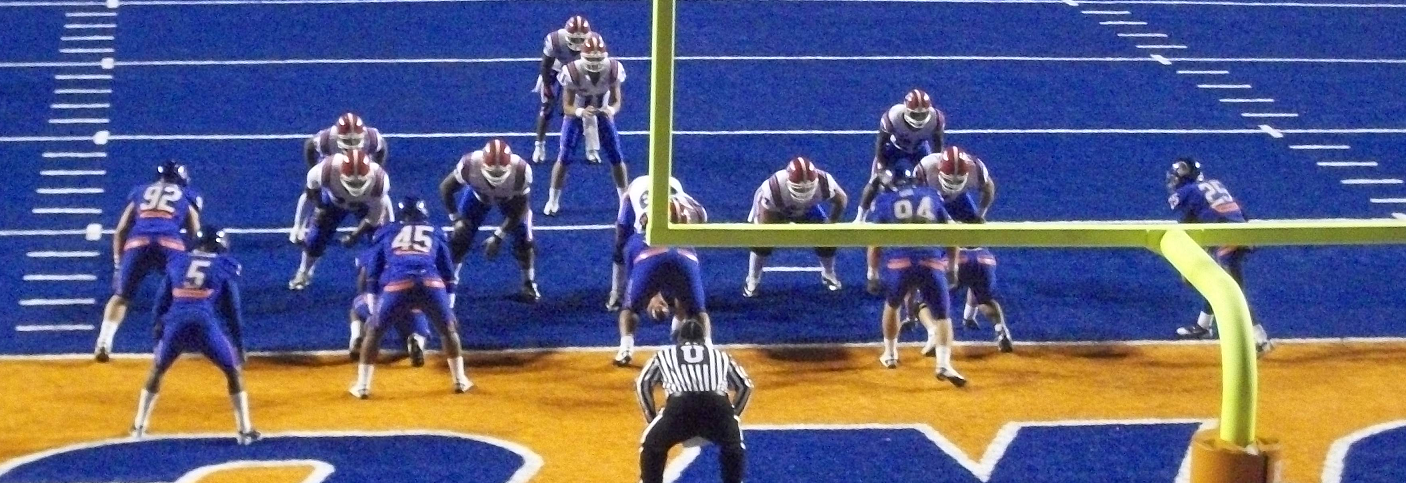
Boise State defense during a 4th quarter goal line stand.

Despite giving up 394 total yards, the most they have given up this season thus far, the Broncos rolled to their 21st straight win and 9th straight over Louisiana Tech 49–20. Kellen Moore, who threw only his second interception of the season, threw 2 touchdowns to tie him with Ryan Dinwiddie (2001–2003) for the most career touchdown passes in school history with 82. Moore also caught a touchdown from wide receiver Austin Pettis, Pettis' second touchdown pass of the year. Doug Martin had his best game of the season 150 yards and 2 touchdowns. He would have had a third touchdown, but he fumbled on the goal line, which was recovered by tight end Kyle Efaw for a Bronco Touchdown. Louisiana Tech consistently drove the ball down the field but turned the ball over on downs 4 times, including 3 times inside the Broncos 10-yard line and twice inside the 5.

Passing Leaders	Rushing Leaders	Receiving Leaders	Total Yards
Kellen Moore: 20/28, 298 YDS, 2 TDS, 1 INT	Doug Martin: 21 CAR, 150 YDS, 2 TDS, LG of 38	Tyler Shoemaker: 6 REC, 124 YDS, 1 TD, LG of 34	BSU: 468
Austin Pettis: 1/1, 7 YDS, 1 TD	Jeremy Avery: 7 CAR, 29 YDS, LG of 26	Austin Pettis: 5 REC, 55 YDS, 1 TD, LG of 20	LT: 394

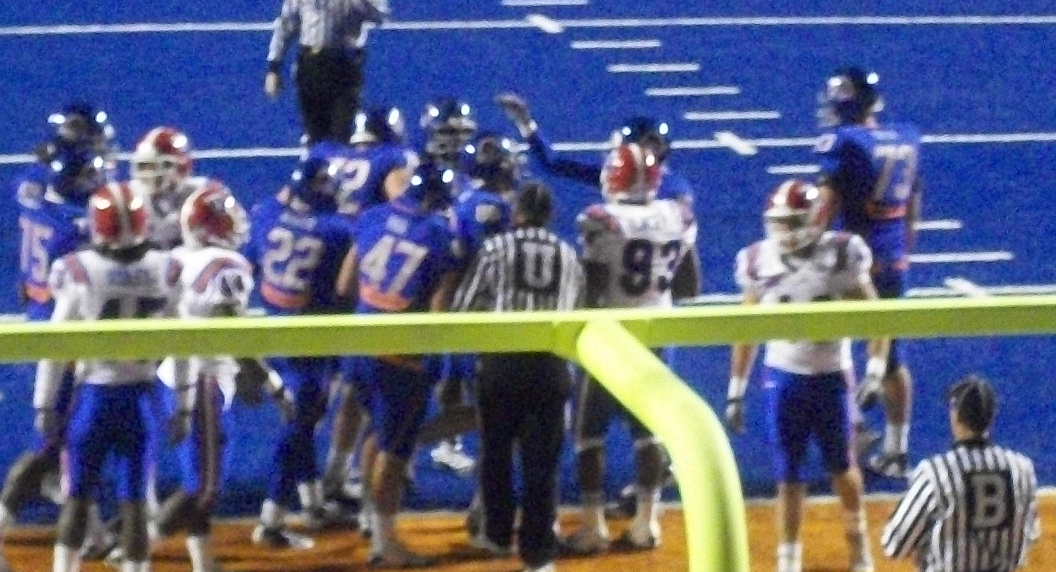
Bronco offense celebrating Kyle Efaw's fumble recovery for a touchdown.

1st Quarter

- 07:08–Doug Martin 2 YD Run (Jimmy Pavel Kick) 0–7
- 03:29–Lennon Creer 1 YD Run (Matt Nelson Kick) 7–7
- 01:33–Austin Pettis 6 YD Pass From Kellen Moore (Jimmy Pavel Kick) 7–14

2nd Quarter

- 07:56–Tyler Shoemaker 32 YD Pass From Kellen Moore (Jimmy Pavel Kick) 7–21
- 00:56–Kyle Efaw Recovered Fumble In End Zone (Jimmy Pavel Kick) 7–28

3rd Quarter

- 09:37–Phillip Livas 23 YD Pass From Ross Jenkins (Pat Failed) 13–28
- 03:40–Jeremy Avery 26 YD Run (Jimmy Pavel Kick) 13–35
- 00:40–Kellen Moore 7 YD Pass From Austin Pettis (Jimmy Pavel Kick) 13–42

4th Quarter

- 07:18–Doug Martin 20 YD Run (Jimmy Pavel Kick) 13–49
- 00:44–Lennon Creer 25 YD Run (Matt Nelson Kick) 20–49

The Broncos remained at #2 in the AP poll but lost 4 first place votes to now have 7. They fell one spot in every other poll to #3 in the Coaches with 3 first place votes, #3 in the Harris with 12 first place votes, and #4 in the BCS. TCU, who Boise State has played in bowl games the last two seasons, jumped over Boise State to #3 in the BCS to put them in position to gain an automatic bid to the BCS over Boise State.

=== Hawaii ===
	1	2	3	4	Total
Warriors	0	0	0	7	7
#3 Broncos	6	15	14	7	42

12th meeting. 8–3 all time. Last meeting 2009, 54–9 Bronco win in Honolulu. With Boise State leaving the WAC, they will not play in 2011 but Hawaii will join the Mountain West as a football only member in 2012 and the series will continue as a conference game.

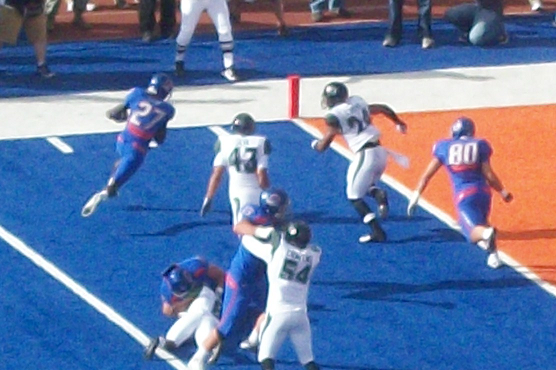
Jeremy Avery (27) scoring a 2nd-quarter TD.

Three school records were set and Kellen Moore picked apart the Hawaii defense in rout to a 42–7 in front of the third largest overall and largest crowd ever to see a conference game at Bronco Stadium. Kellen Moore threw for a career-high 507 yards going 30 of 37 with three touchdowns and 2 INTs. His three touchdown passes gives him the school record for touchdown passes in a career, now with 85. Moore also completed the longest pass of his career with a third quarter 83-yard TD pass to Titus Young. Austin Pettis caught 8 passes, including one touchdown of 43 yards, and now holds the record for career receptions in school history, currently with 196, breaking Don Hutt's record set 37 years ago. Jeremy Avery had 3 touchdown runs and now has 9 TDs on the season and has scored a TD in 5 straight games. The Bronco offense racked up a total of 737 total yards for the most total yards in school history. The Bronco defense held the nations leading passing attack to only 151 yards and recorded 7 sacks, the most in a game this season. Shea McClellin's two sacks gives him a team high 6.5 on the season.

Passing Leaders	Rushing Leaders	Receiving Leaders	Total Yards
Kellen Moore: 30/37, 507 YDS, 3 TDS, 2 INTS	Jeremy Avery: 10 CAR, 92 YDS, 3 TDS, LG of 35	Austin Pettis: 8 REC, 122 YDS, 1 TD, LG of 43	BSU: 737
	Doug Martin: 17 CAR, 55 YDS, LG of 11	Tyler Shoemaker: 5 REC, 117 YDS, 1 TD, LG of 35	HAW: 196

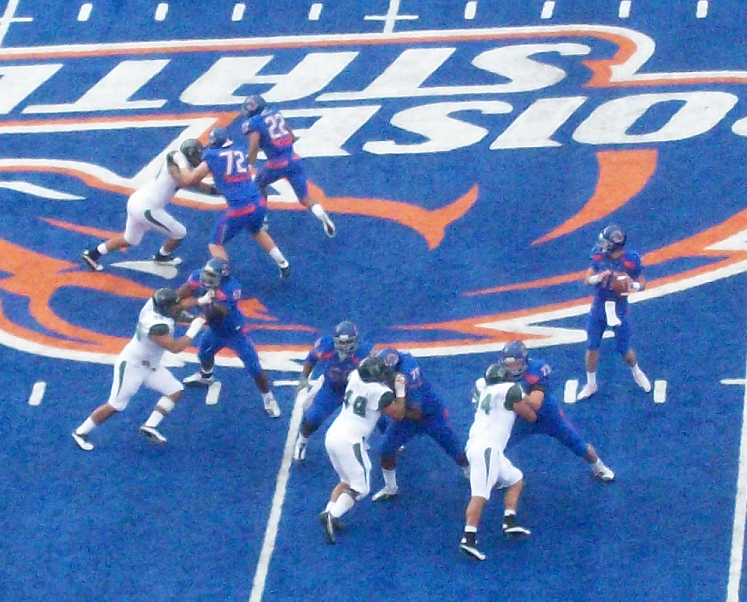
Kellen Moore threw for 507 yards and the offense had a school record 737 yards.

1st Quarter

- 05:31 BSU–Jeremy Avery 14 YD Run (Two-Point Conversion Failed) 0–6

2nd Quarter

- 14:23 BSU–Tyler Shoemaker 12 YD Pass From Kellen Moore (Kyle Brotzman Kick) 0–13
- 09:26 BSU–Jeremy Avery 4 YD Run (Austin Pettis Run For Two-Point Conversion) 0–21

3rd Quarter

- 12:14 BSU–Austin Pettis 43 YD Pass From Kellen Moore (Kyle Brotzman Kick) 0–28
- 08:47 BSU–Titus Young 83 YD Pass From Kellen Moore (Kyle Brotzman Kick) 0–35

4th Quarter

- 14:52 BSU–Jeremy Avery 19 YD Run (Kyle Brotzman Kick) 0–42
- 13:16 HAW–Alex Green 54 YD Run (Scott Enos Kick) 7–42

For his record-breaking performance Kellen Moore was named the WAC offensive player of the week for the third time this season. Despite the win, the Broncos would fall in the polls again and are now ranked #4 in every major poll. They are still receiving first place votes in all 3 human polls with 7 in the AP, 3 in the Coaches, and 9 in the Harris poll.

=== Idaho ===
	1	2	3	4	Total
#4 Broncos	28	10	14	0	52
Vandals	0	0	7	7	14

40th meeting. 21–17–1 all time. Last meeting 2009, 63–25 Broncos win in Boise. Despite a 40-year rivalry, there are currently no future plans to meet again.

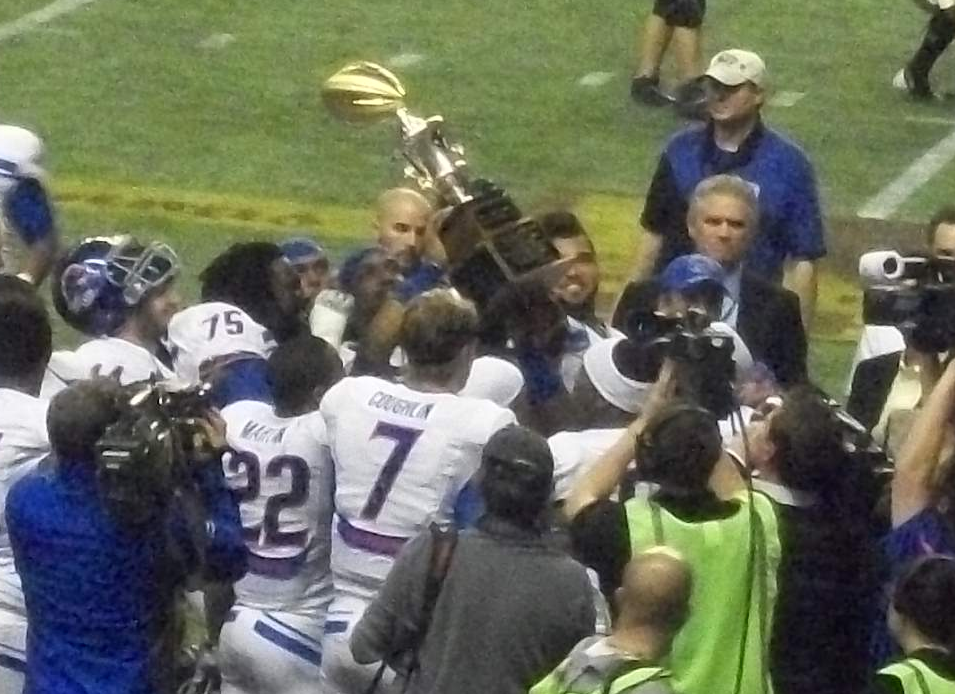
Boise State players celebrate with the Governor's Trophy

Boise State set a school record for consecutive wins (23) with their 12th straight win over their in-state rival in potentially their final meeting after games for 40 straight years. Boise State got on the board within the first minute of the game on a 76-yard punt return for a touchdown by Chris Potter. The Broncos added three more first-quarter touchdowns, including a 58-yard TD pass from Kellen Moore to Titus Young. A Kyle Brotzman field goal and Moore's second TD pass (17 yards to Jeremy Avery) brought the score to 38–0 at halftime. As they did in the first quarter, the Broncos again scored in the first minute of the third quarter when Doug Martin broke away for a 39-yard TD run. Later in the third Kellen Moore found Gabe Linehan from 21 yards out for his third TD pass of the game. Kicker Kyle Brotzman scored 10 points and set the WAC record for points in a career, now with 403, passing Jason Elam (395 at Hawaii from 1989 to 1992). The Broncos defense recorded three interceptions, two by Brandyn Thompson to give him 12 for his career. Jeron Johnson blocked a Vandal punt, the first block of his career and second on the season for the Broncos. Boise State has not trailed since their final drive against Virginia Tech in the season opener, a streak of 481:09.

Passing leaders	Rushing leaders	Receiving leaders	Total yards
Kellen Moore: 19/26, 216 YDS, 3 TDS	Doug Martin: 16 CAR, 117 YDS, 2 TDS, LG of 39	Titus Young: 5 REC, 75 YDS, 1 TD, LG of 58	BSU: 424
Joe Southwick: 3/4, 9 YDS	Jarvis Hodge: 8 CAR, 52 YDS, LG of 22	Jeremy Avery: 3 REC, 34 YDS, 1 TD, LG of 17	IDA: 316

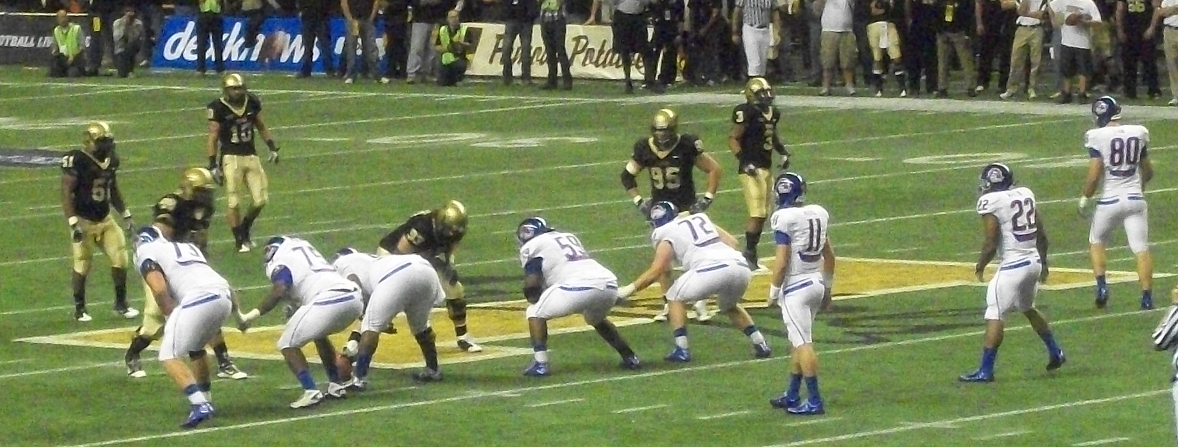
Boise State offense scored six touchdowns.

1st Quarter

- 14:19 BSU–Chris Potter 76 YD Punt Return (Kyle Brotzman Kick) 7–0
- 08:58 BSU–Doug Martin 8 YD Run (Kyle Brotzman Kick) 14–0
- 04:01 BSU–Jeremy Avery 1 Yd Run (Kyle Brotzman Kick) 21–0
- 00:56 BSU–Titus Young 58 YD pass From Kellen Moore (Kyle Brotzman Kick) 28–0

2nd Quarter

- 08:57 BSU–Kyle Brotzman 41 YD FG 31–0
- 00:12 BSU–Jeremy Avery 17 YD pass From Kellen Moore (Kyle Brotzman kick) 38–0

3rd Quarter

- 14:05 BSU–Doug Martin 39 YD Run (Kyle Brotzman Kick) 45–0
- 10:30 IDA–Eric Greenwood 17 YD Pass From Nathan Enderle (Trey Farquhar kick) 45–7
- 07:11 BSU–Gabe Linehan 21 YD Pass From Kellen Moore (Kyle Brotzman Kick) 52–7

4th Quarter

- 09:26 IDA–Aaron Lavarias 0 YD Fumble Return (Trey Farquhar Kick) 52–14

Punt returner Chris Potter was named the WAC special teams player of the week for the second time this season. The Broncos climbed back up to #3 in the AP, Coaches, and Harris polls and remained at #4 in the BCS. They did receive more first-place votes in all three polls (9 AP, 5 Coaches, 11 Harris).

=== Fresno State ===
	1	2	3	4	Total
Bulldogs	0	0	0	0	0
#3 Broncos	3	17	17	14	51

13th meeting. 8–4 all time. Last meeting 2009, 51–34 Bronco win in Fresno. The Broncos will play a non-conference game in Fresno in 2011 before the rivalry becomes a conference game again in 2012 in the Mountain West.

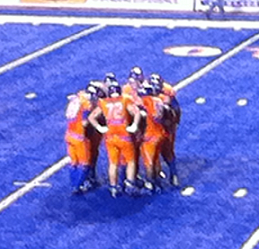
The BSU offense generated 516 total yards.

Boise State once again rewrote the record book in a dominating performance against their rival Fresno State to once again win the Milk Can. Despite a slow start that included an interception and a fumble on their first two possessions, Kellen Moore rallied to have a spectacular game, going 27 of 38 for 333 yards and four touchdowns and passed Ryan Dinwiddie for the most passing yards in school history, currently at 9,943. Moore connected with Titus Young eight times for two touchdowns and 164 yards, a career-high, to help Young break a school record for career receiving yards, currently with 2,836. Austin Pettis also caught two touchdowns to increase his school record for career receiving touchdowns to 37. One week after breaking the WAC scoring record, kicker Kyle Brotzman broke Brock Forsey's school record for career points, currently with 418. The Bronco defense recorded 4 sacks and 2 interceptions to shut out the Bulldogs, the first time Fresno State has been shut out since 1998. Boise State wore all-orange uniforms for the first time.

Passing Leaders	Rushing Leaders	Receiving Leaders	Total Yards
Kellen Moore: 27/38, 333 YDS, 4 TDS, 1 INT	Doug Martin: 24 CAR, 72 YDS, 1 TD, LG of 8	Titus Young: 8 REC, 164 YDS, 2 TDS, LG of 45	BSU: 516
Austin Pettis: 1/1, 50 YDS	Jeremy Avery: 8 CAR, 27 YDS, LG of 8	Austin Pettis: 10 REC, 93 yds, 2 TDs, LG of 18	FRES: 125

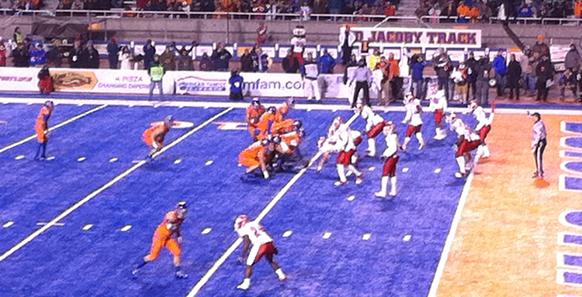
Boise State about to score in the second quarter

1st Quarter

- 00:53 BSU–Kyle Brotzman 20 YD FG 0–3

2nd Quarter

- 08:34 BSU–Doug Martin 1 YD Run (Kyle Brotzman Kick) 0–10
- 06:15 BSU–Titus Young 42 YD Pass From Kellen Moore (Kyle Brotzman Kick) 0–17
- 00:00 BSU–Kyle Brotzman 20 YD FG 0–20

3rd Quarter

- 07:21 BSU–Kyle Brotzman 50 YD FG 0–23
- 03:46 BSU–Austin Pettis 15 YD Pass From Kellen Moore (Kyle Brotzman Kick) 0–30
- 00:02 BSU–Austin Pettis 6 YD Pass From Kellen Moore (Kyle Brotzman Kick) 0–37

4th Quarter

- 12:29 BSU–Titus Young 28 YD Pass From Kellen Moore (Kyle Brotzman Kick) 0–44
- 04:59 BSU–Jarvis Hodge 4 Yd Run (Kyle Brotzman Kick) 0–51

Kyle Brotzman, who connected on a pair of 20-yard field goals and one from 50, was named the WAC special teams player of the week for the second time this season. The Broncos remained the same in every major poll, but did receive one more first-place vote in the AP and three more first-place votes in the Harris. They also closed the gap in the BCS poll with #3 TCU from 0.033 to 0.014.

=== Nevada ===
	1	2	3	4	OT	Total
#3 Broncos	3	21	0	7	0	31
#19 Wolf Pack	0	7	7	17	3	34

37th meeting. 24–12 all time. Last meeting 2009, 44–33 Bronco win in Boise. The Broncos will play a non-conference game against the Wolf Pack in Boise in 2011 before the rivalry becomes a conference game in 2012 in the Mountain West.

The Broncos were shocked by their rival Nevada, ending the Broncos' 24-game winning streak, 35 straight regular season wins, 10 straight wins over the Wolf Pack, and dashed their dreams of going to another BCS game. The Broncos went up big early, scoring on a field goal, a 28-yard touchdown pass from Kellen Moore to Titus Young, and two Doug Martin rushing touchdowns from 4 and 51 yards to put the Broncos up 24–7 at halftime. The Bronco offense went away in the second half and Nevada's pistol attack ran all over the Boise State defense scoring 17 straight points to tie the game at 24 with about 5 minutes to play. On their possession after Nevada tied it up, Boise State answered on their first play with a 79-yard screen pass to Doug Martin to put the Broncos up 31–24. However, the Broncos scored too fast as Nevada would methodically march the ball down the field eating up 4:40 off the clock and tied the game at 31 with 13 seconds to play. After the kickoff, the Broncos had 9 seconds. Kellen Moore went deep and connected on a 53-yard pass to Titus Young to put the Broncos on Nevada's 9 yard line with 2 seconds to play. Kicker Kyle Brotzman had a 26-yard field goal attempt for the win. He missed. The Broncos got the ball first in overtime and were held to a field goal attempt, this time from 29 yards. Brotzman missed again. Nevada Kicker Anthony Martinez connected on a 33-yard field goal on the Wolf Pack possession to give Nevada their first win in the series since 1998.

Passing Leaders	Rushing Leaders	Receiving Leaders	Total Yards
Kellen Moore: 20/31, 348 YDS, 2 TDS	Doug Martin: 24 CAR, 152 YDS, 2 TDS, LG of 51	Titus Young: 6 REC, 129 YDS, 1 TD, LG of 53	BSU: 493
Colin Kaepernick: 19/35, 259 YDS, 1 TD	Vai Taua: 32 CAR, 131 YDS, 1 TD, LG of 26	Rishard Matthews: 10 REC, 172 YDS, 1 TD, LG of 47	NEV: 528

1st Quarter

- 06:28 BSU–Kyle Brotzman 33 YD FG 3–0

2nd Quarter

- 12:38 BSU–Doug Martin 4 YD Run (Kyle Brotzman Kick) 10–0
- 05:47 BSU–Titus Young 26 YD Pass From Kellen Moore (Kyle Brotzman Kick) 17–0
- 04:20 NEV–Vai Taua 5 YD Run (Anthony Martinez Kick) 17–7
- 02:59 BSU–Doug Martin 51 YD Run (Kyle Brotzman Kick) 24–7

3rd Quarter

- 01:23 NEV–Colin Kaepernick 18 YD Run (Anthony Martinez Kick) 24–14

4th Quarter

- 13:01 NEV–Rishard Matthews 44 YD Run (Anthony Martinez Kick) 24–21
- 05:14 NEV–Anthony Martinez 23 YD FG 24–24
- 04:53 BSU–Doug Martin 79 YD Pass From Kellen Moore (Kyle Brotzman Kick) 31–24
- 00:13 NEV–Rishard Matthews 7 YD Pass From Colin Kaepernick (Anthony Martinez Kick) 31–31

Overtime

- NEV–Anthony Martinez 34 YD FG 31–34

After the loss, Boise State fell in every major poll to #9 in the AP, #10 in the Coaches and Harris, and #11 in the BCS.

=== Utah State ===
	1	2	3	4	Total
Aggies	7	0	0	7	14
#10 Broncos	15	14	14	7	50

17th meeting. 12–4 all time. Last meeting 2009, 52–21 Bronco win in Logan. With Boise State leaving the WAC, they are not currently scheduled to play each other again.

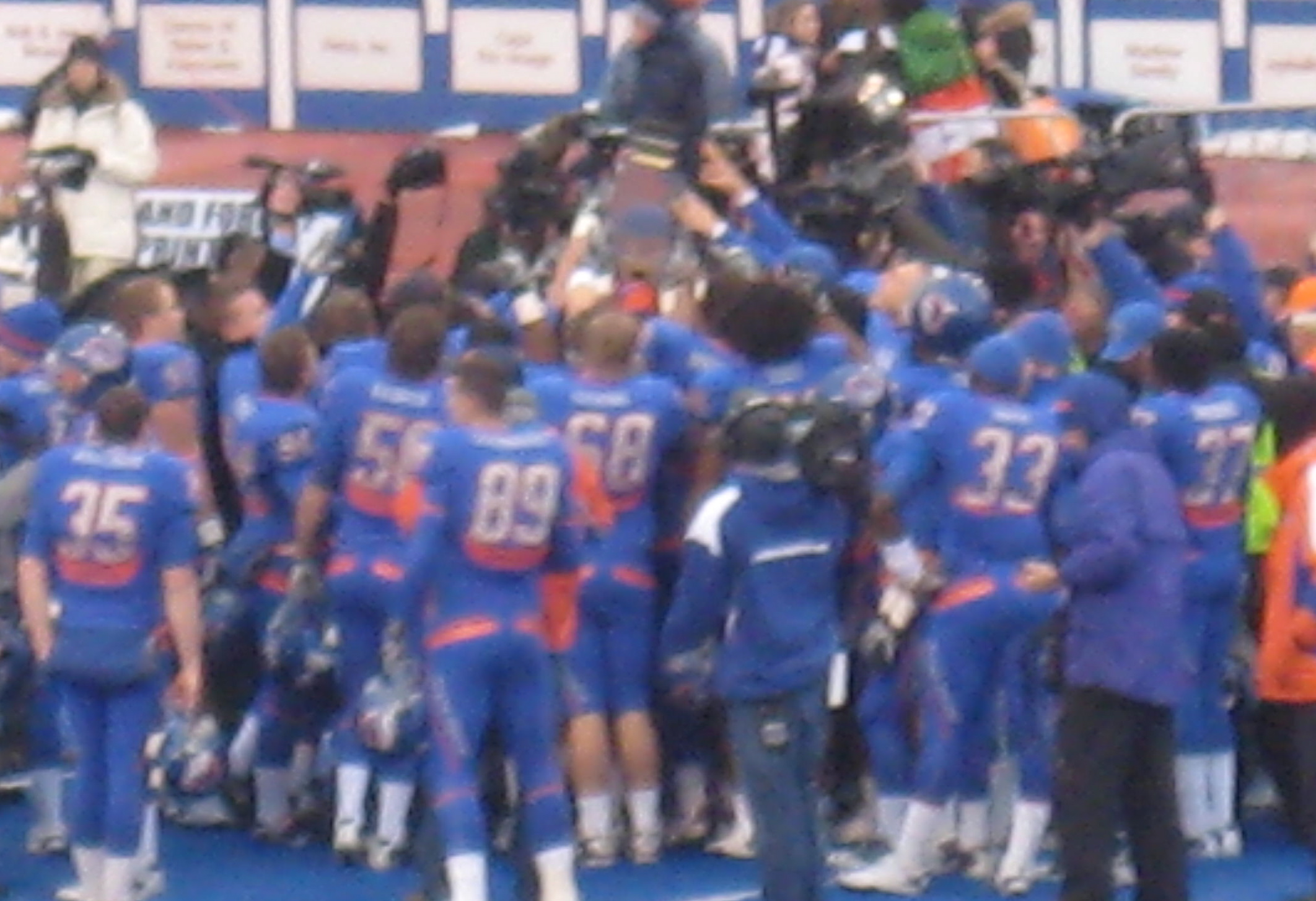
BSU players with the schools 8th WAC championship trophy.

In Boise State's last conference game as a member of the WAC, they secured a share of their 8th conference title in 10 years and finished 75–5 all time in WAC games, including going 40–0 at home. The Broncos got on the board very early when Sr. linebacker Derrell Acrey picked off the Aggies first play of the game and took it back 31 yards for the score just 14 seconds into the game. Kellen Moore supplied the rest of the first half offense with three touchdown passes (12, 2, 4) with a pair to tight end Kyle Efaw for a halftime score of 29–7. The ground game took over in the second half with Jeremy Avery, Kellen Moore, and Michael Coughlin all with rushing touchdowns. The Bronco defense kept Utah State to only 41 yards passing and forced 2 interceptions and 4 sacks.

Passing Leaders	Rushing Leaders	Receiving Leaders	Total Yards
Kellen Moore: 24/34, 237 YDS, 3 TDS	Jeremy Avery: 10 CAR, 71 YDS, 1 TD, LG of 20	Kyle Efaw: 5 REC, 76 YDS, 2 TDS, LG of 30	BSU: 453
Mike Coughlin 1/2, 14 YDS	Jarvis Hodge: 8 CAR, 48 YDS, LG of 11	Austin Pettis: 4 REC, 51 YDS, 1 TD, LG of 21	USU: 291

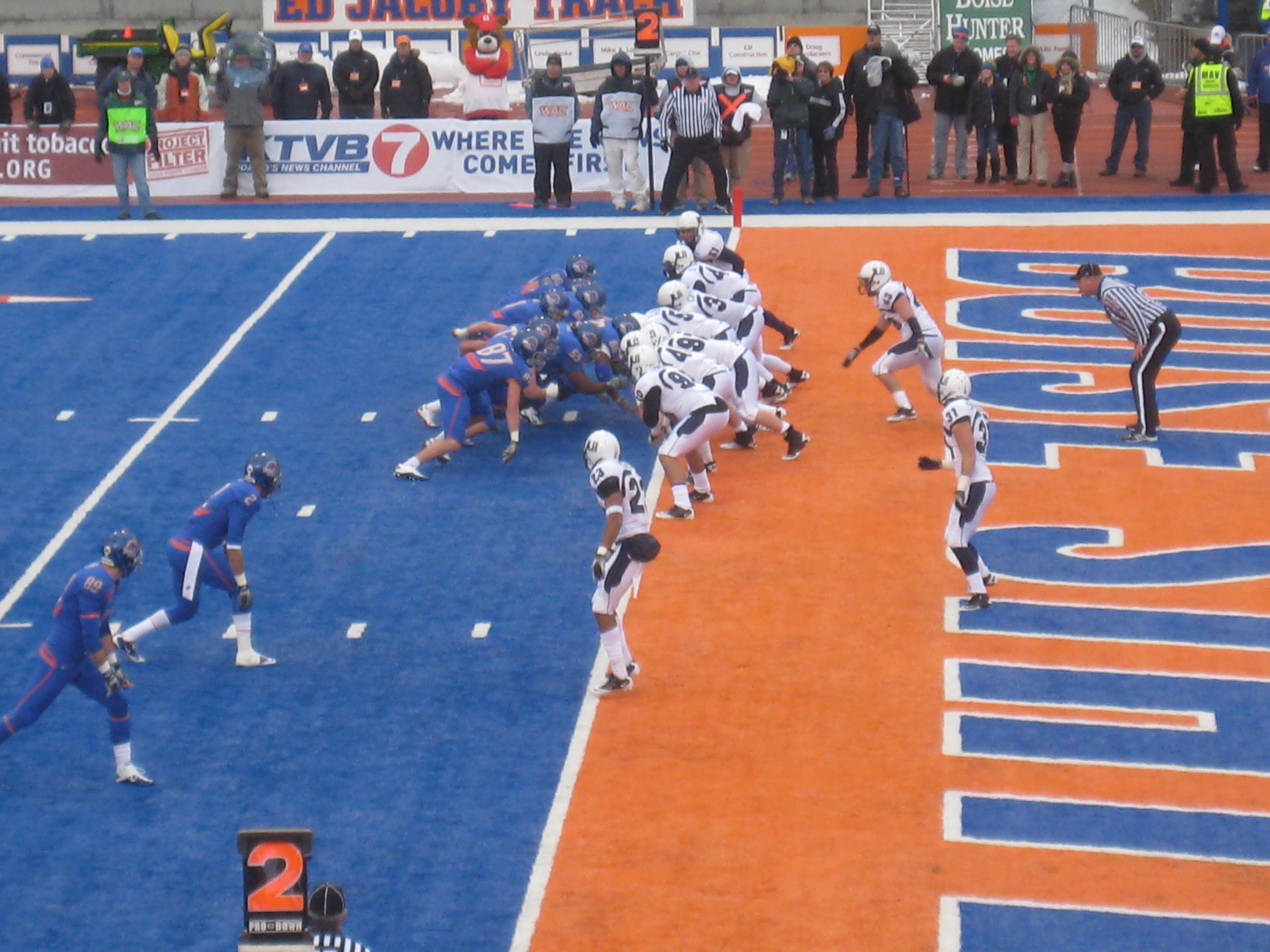
Kellen Moore scoring a rushing TD in the 3rd quarter.

1st Quarter

- 14:46 BSU–Derrell Acrey 31 YD Interception Return (Kyle Brotzman Kick) 0–7
- 08:21 BSU–Kyle Efaw 12 YD Pass From Kellen Moore (Austin Pettis Run For Two-Point Conversion) 0–15
- 01:00 USU–Kerwynn Williams 40 YD Run (Peter Caldwell Kick) 7–15

2nd Quarter

- 13:07 BSU–Kyle Efaw 2 YD Pass From Kellen Moore (Kyle Brotzman Kick) 7–22
- 01:13 BSU–Austin Pettis 4 YD Pass From Kellen Moore (Kyle Brotzman Kick) 7–29

3rd Quarter

- 06:55 BSU–Jeremy Avery 13 YD Run (Kyle Brotzman Kick) 7–36
- 00:17 BSU–Kellen Moore 1 YD Run (Kyle Brotzman Kick) 7–43

4th Quarter

- 11:03 USU–Diondre Borel 1 YD Run (Peter Caldwell Kick) 14–43
- 06:21 BSU–Mike Coughlin 1 YD Run (Kyle Brotzman Kick) 14–50

The Broncos would fall in one poll and gain in another to finish the regular season #10 in every major poll. With the Pac-10 not having enough bowl eligible teams, Boise State was selected to take the Pac-10's spot in the Maaco Bowl Las Vegas to play #19 Utah.

=== Utah–Maaco Bowl Las Vegas ===
	1	2	3	4	Total
#19 Utes	3	0	0	0	3
#10 Broncos	0	16	7	3	26

7th meeting. 4–2 all time. Last meeting 2006, 36–3 Bronco win in Salt Lake City. The Broncos and Utes were scheduled to play in 2011, 2012, and 2013, but Utah bought their way out of the series in order to continue playing their rival BYU since both teams are leaving the Mountain West next season.

In a Matchup of the first two BCS busters, Boise State dominated after a slow start to win their first non BCS bowl game since 2003. The Broncos fumbled on their first possession of the game to give Utah a short field but held the Utes to a field goal attempt which they missed. After a Boise State punt, the Broncos recovered a Utah fumble, but failed to convert on a fake punt on their following possession. The Broncos' next possession also ended with no success when Kellen Moore threw his 6th interception of the season, which led to a Utah field goal, their only score of the game. The Broncos were held scoreless in the first quarter for the first time in 21 games. They turned the ball over again early in the second quarter when Kyle Efaw fumbled while trying to convert on fourth down. All of the Broncos early mistakes seemed to disappear when Doug Martin took the first play of their next possession 84 yards for the Broncos first score. The run was the longest play in the 19-year history of the Maaco/Las Vegas Bowl and the second longest run play in Boise State history. The Broncos scored again on their next two possessions with a 29-yard Kyle Brotzman field goal and 25 yard touchdown pass from Moore to Tyler Shoemaker to lead 16–3 at halftime. The Broncos opened the second half by recovering a fumble on Utah's first possession. The Broncos looked to be about to score a touchdown after Moore found Austin Pettis for 46 yards, but Pettis was stripped near the goal line and the ball went out of the endzone for a touchback. However, Moore and Pettis would connect on an 18-yard touchdown on the Broncos next possession. Another Ute fumble set up a 27-yard Brotzman field goal which was blocked. The Broncos added a 4th quarter 21 yard Brotzman field goal to bring the final score to 26–3. Despite turning the ball over 4 times, the Broncos gained 543 total yards. The Bronco defense gave up only 200 total yards and forced 3 turnovers and 4 sacks. Kyle Brotzman's 8 points helped set an NCAA record for most points in a career for a kicker with 439.

Passing Leaders	Rushing Leaders	Receiving Leaders	Total Yards
Kellen Moore: 28/38, 339 YDS, 2 TDS, 1 INT	Doug Martin: 17 CAR, 147 YDS, 1 TD, LG of 84	Austin Pettis: 12 REC, 147 YDS, 1 TD, LG of 46	BSU: 543
Austin Pettis 1/1, 2 YDS	Jeremy Avery: 12 CAR, 55 YDS, LG of 14	Tyler Shoemaker: 5 REC, 89 YDS, 1 TD, LG of 25	UTAH: 200

1st Quarter

- 00:56 UTAH–Joe Phillips 44 YD FG 3–0

2nd Quarter

- 08:39 BSU–Doug Martin 84 YD Run (Kyle Brotzman Kick) 3–7
- 02:27 BSU–Kyle Brotzman 29 YD FG 3–10
- 00:18 BSU–Tyler Shoemaker 25 YD Pass From Kellen Moore (Two-Point Conversion Failed) 3–16

3rd Quarter

- 08:18 BSU–Austin Pettis 18 YD Pass From Kellen Moore (Kyle Brotzman Kick) 3–23

4th Quarter

- 08:49 BSU–Kyle Brotzman 21 YD FG 3–26

Following all the bowl games, the Broncos would finish the season ranked #7 in the Coaches poll and #9 in the AP poll.

== Post-season awards ==
Jr. QB Kellen Moore was a finalist for four national awards.

- Davey O'Brien Award–awarded to Auburn's Cam Newton.
- Maxwell Award–awarded to Auburn's Cam Newton.
- Manning Award–awarded to Auburn's Cam Newton.
- Heisman Trophy–awarded to Cam Newton. Moore finished 4th in voting.

Moore was also honored by the Touchdown Club of Columbus as the nations top quarterback.

Head coach Chris Petersen was named the winner of the Bobby Dodd Coach of the Year Award.

=== WAC first team ===
WAC Co-Offensive Player of the Year

Kellen Moore (2009 WAC Offensive Player of the Year)

Offense

Austin Pettis Sr. WR (2009 1st team, 2008 2nd team)

Titus Young Sr. WR (2009 1st team)

Thomas Byrd Jr. OL

Nate Potter Jr. OL (2009 1st team)

Kellen Moore Jr. QB (2009 1st team, 2008 2nd team)

Doug Martin Jr. RB

Defense

Shea McClellin Jr. DL

Ryan Winterswyk Sr. DL (2009 & 2008 1st team)

Winston Venable Sr. LB (2009 2nd team)

George Iloka Jr. DB

Jeron Johnson Sr. DB (2009 & 2008 2nd team)

=== WAC second team ===
Defense

Billy Wynn Jr. DL (2009 2nd team)

Byron Hout Jr. LB

Brandyn Thompson Sr. DB

=== All-American lists ===
Kellen Moore Jr. QB–Football Writers Association of America All-American, AP 3rd team.

Nate Potter Jr. OL–AP 3rd team.

Titus Young Sr. WR–AP 3rd team.

Billy Wynn Jr. DL–AP 3rd team.

== Rankings ==
Ranking movements Legend: ██ Increase in ranking ██ Decrease in ranking ( ) = First-place votes
	Week															
Poll	Pre	1	2	3	4	5	6	7	8	9	10	11	12	13	14	Final
AP	3 (1)	3 (8)	3 (1)	3 (1)	3 (1)	4 (1)	3 (8)	2 (15)	2 (11)	2 (7)	4 (7)	3 (9)	3 (10)	9	10	9
Coaches	5	3	3	3	3	4	3 (1)	2 (11)	2 (5)	3 (3)	4 (3)	3 (5)	3 (5)	10	10	7
Harris	Not released						3 (10)	2 (29)	2 (14)	3 (12)	4 (9)	3 (11)	3 (14)	10	10	Not released
BCS	Not released							3	3	4	4	4	4	11	10	Not released

== NFL draft ==
2nd Round, 44th Overall Pick by the Detroit Lions—Sr. WR Titus Young

3rd Round, 78th Overall Pick by the St. Louis Rams—Sr. WR Austin Pettis

7th Round, 213th Overall Pick by the Washington Redskins—Sr. CB Brandyn Thompson

== Statistics ==
=== Team ===
	BSU	Opp
Scoring	586	166
Points per game	45.1	12.8
First downs	326	192
Rushing	2,603	1,349
Passing	4,174	1,962
Total offense	6,777	3,311
Avg per game	521.3	254.7
Penalties-Yards	74–711	71–609
Fumbles-Lost	23–13	29–13

	BSU	Opp	Neutral
Punts-Yards	32–1,372	84–3,396	
Avg per punt	42.9	40.4	
Time of possession/Game	30:38	30:31	
3rd down conversions	76/155-49%	54/189-29%	
4th down conversions	6/16-38%	9/24-38%	
Touchdowns scored	77	22	
Field goals-Attempts	16–24	5–12	
PAT-Attempts	70/72-97%	19/21-90%	
Attendance	199,135	116,079	128,510
Games/Avg per Game	6–33,272	5–23,216	2–64,255

==== Scores by quarter ====
	1	2	3	4	OT	Total
Boise State	170	199	145	72	0	586
Opponents	31	24	53	55	3	166

=== Offense ===
==== Rushing ====
Name	GP	Att	Yards	Avg	TD	Long	Avg/G
Doug Martin	13	201	1,260	6.3	12	84	96.9
Jeremy Avery	13	95	495	5.2	11	35	38.1
Jarvis Hodge	13	46	305	6.6	3	54	23.5
D.J. Harper	3	18	160	8.9	2	71	53.3
Matt Kaiserman	13	39	140	3.6	1	17	10.8
Mike Coughlin	8	14	98	7.0	2	17	12.2
Titus Young	13	14	94	6.7	1	38	7.2
Drew Wright	11	12	38	3.2	0	17	3.5
Chris Potter	12	6	33	5.5	0	12	2.8
Joe Southwick	8	9	31	3.4	0	20	3.9
Brenel Myers	12	0	5	0.0	0	5	0.4
Dan Paul	12	1	1	1.0	0	1	0.1
Kyle Efaw	13	0	0	0.0	1	0	0.0
Tyler Shoemaker	13	1	−1	−1.0	0	0	−0.1
Kellen Moore	13	19	−32	−1.7	1	12	−2.5
TEAM	9	11	−24	−2.2	0	0	−2.7
Broncos Total	13	486	2,603	5.4	34	84	200.2
Opponents	13	461	1,349	2.9	12	54	103.8

==== Passing ====
Name	GP	Cmp–Att	Pct	Yds	TD	INT	Lng	Avg/G	RAT
Kellen Moore	13	273–383	71.3	3,845	35	6	83	295.8	182.6
Joe Southwick	8	17–24	70.8	202	1	0	78	25.2	155.3
Mike Coughlin	8	4–9	44.4	36	0	0	14	4.5	78.0
Austin Pettis	13	4–4	100.0	65	2	0	48	5.0	401.5
Chris Potter	12	1–2	50.0	26	0	0	26	2.2	159.2
Broncos Total	13	299–424	70.5	4,174	38	6	83	321.1	180.0
Opponents	13	190–371	51.2	1,962	8	14	47	150.9	95.2

==== Receiving ====
Name	GP	Rec	Yds	Avg	TD	Long	Avg/G
Titus Young	13	71	1,215	17.1	9	83	93.5
Austin Pettis	13	71	951	13.4	10	58	73.2
Tyler Shoemaker	13	32	582	18.2	5	48	44.8
Doug Martin	13	28	338	12.1	2	79	26.0
Kyle Efaw	13	24	299	12.5	5	41	23.0
Jeremy Avery	13	14	154	11.0	1	26	11.8
Geraldo Hiwat	13	11	160	14.5	0	48	12.3
Chris Potter	12	8	125	15.6	1	78	10.4
Tommy Gallarda	7	7	63	9.0	3	17	9.0
Dan Paul	12	7	30	4.3	0	13	2.5
Gabe Linehan	13	6	59	9.8	1	17	7.4
Mitch Burroughs	8	6	59	9.8	0	17	7.4
Aaron Burks	10	6	58	9.7	0	16	5.8
D.J. Harper	3	4	36	9.0	0	18	12.0
Chandler Koch	11	2	4	2.0	0	4	0.4
Matt Kaiserman	13	1	11	11.0	0	11	0.8
Kellen Moore	13	1	7	7.0	1	7	0.5
Broncos Total	13	299	4,174	14.0	38	83	321.1
Opponents	13	190	1,962	10.3	8	47	150.9

=== Defense ===
Team	GP	Tackles				Sacks	Pass Defense		Interceptions				Fumbles		Blkd Kick	
Team	GP	Solo	Ast	Total	TFL-Yds	No-Yds	BrUp	QBH	No.-Yds	Avg	TD	Long	Rcv-Yds-TD	FF	Blkd Kick	SFT
Total																

=== Special teams ===
Field goals	Made-Att	Pct	01-19	20–29	30–39	40–49	50–60	LNG	BLKD	PAT

Team	Punting								Kickoffs				
Team	No.	Yds	Avg	Long	TB	FC	I20	Blkd	No.	Yds	Avg	TB	OB
Total													

Team	Punt returns					Kick returns				
Team	No.	Yds	Avg	TD	Long	No.	Yds	Avg	TD	Long
Total										

==== Scoring ====
Name	TD	FG	PAT	2PT PAT	SAFETY	TOT PTS
Kyle Brotzman		16–23	59–61			107
Doug Martin	14					84
Jeremy Avery	12					72
Austin Pettis	10			3		66
Titus Young	10					60
Kyle Efaw	6					36
Tyler Shoemaker	5					30
Jarvis Hodge	3					18
Tommy Gallarda	3					18
Kellen Moore	2					12
Mike Coughlin	2					12
Chris Potter	2					12
D.J. Harper	2					12
Shea McClellin	2					12
Jimmy Pavel		0–1	9–9			9
Matt Kaiserman	1					6
Aaron Tevis	1					6
Derrell Acrey	1					6
Gabe Linehan	1					6
Trevor Harman			2–2			2
Broncos Total	77	16–24	70–72	3		586
Opponents	22	5–12	19–21			166

== Roster ==
No.	Name	Pos.	Ht.	Wt.	Cls.	Hometown (H.S./Prev. Exp.)
1	Titus Young	WR	5–10	170	Sr.	Los Angeles, CA (University HS)
2	Austin Pettis	WR	6–3	201	Sr.	Anaheim, CA (Lutheran HS)
3	Chris Potter	WR	5–9	161	So.	Westlake Village, CA (Oaks Christian High School)
4	Jerrell Gavins	CB	5–9	171	Jr.	Miami, FL (El Camino JC) (South Miami Senior HS)
5	Jason Robinson	S	5–11	194	Sr.	Los Angeles, CA (University HS)
6	D.J. Harper	RB	5–9	198	Jr.	Cypress, TX (Cypress Creek HS)
7	Mike Coughlin	QB	6–5	212	Sr.	San Diego, CA (Mira Mesa HS)
8	George Iloka	S	6–3	207	Jr.	Houston, TX (Kempner HS)
9	Mike Tamburo	QB	5–11	183	Fr.	Suwanee, GA (North Gwinnett HS)
11	Kellen Moore	QB	6–0	187	Jr.	Prosser, WA (Prosser HS)
13	Brandyn Thompson	CB	5–10	180	Sr.	Elk Grove, CA (Franklin HS)
14	Trevor Harman	P	6-2	188	Fr.	Beaverton, OR (Southridge HS)
15	Quaylon Ewing	CB	6–0	175	Fr.	Houston, TX (Kempner HS)
15	Joe Southwick	QB	6–1	182	Fr.	Danville, CA (San Ramon Valley HS)
16	Cedric Febis	DB	6–3	197	Jr.	Amsterdam, Netherlands (Bishop Kelly HS in Boise, ID)
17	Winston Venable	S	5–11	223	Sr.	San Rafael, CA (Glendale Community College) (St. Thomas More Prep (Oakdale, CT))
18	Aaron Burks	WR	6–2	186	Fr.	Grand Prairie, TX (Mansfield Timberview HS)
19	Josh Borgman	CB	5–7	169	So.	Boise, ID (Centennial HS)
20	Mitch Burroughs	WR	5–9	188	So.	Meridian, ID (Meridian HS)
21	Carlo Audagnotti	RB	5–7	176	So.	Johannesburg, South Africa (Santa Margarita HS)
21	Jamar Taylor	DB	5–11	193	So.	San Diego, California (Helix HS)
22	Doug Martin	RB	5–9	201	Jr.	Stockton, CA (Saint Mary's HS)
23	Jeron Johnson	S	5–11	194	Sr.	Compton, CA (Dominguez HS)
24	Malcolm Johnson	RB	5–10	181	Fr.	Gresham, OR (Barlow HS)
25	Hunter White	LB	5–11	224	Jr.	Huntington Beach, CA (Edison HS)
26	Matt Kaiserman	RB	6–0	188	So.	Nampa, ID (Skyview HS)
27	Jeremy Avery	RB	5–9	179	Sr.	Bellflower, CA (Bellflower HS)
28	Jarvis Hodge	RB	5–9	203	Sr.	Phoenix, AZ (Mountain Point HS)
28	Dane Turner	S	5–10	170	Fr.	Sutter, CA (Sutter Union HS)
29	Tyler Jackson	S	6–0	203	So.	Castle Rock, Colorado (Douglas County High School)
30	Travis Stanaway	S	5–11	188	Jr.	Clyde Hill, WA (Bellevue HS)
31	Antwon Murray	CB	5–11	177	Jr.	Lakeland, FL (Kathleen HS)
32	Jonathan Brown	S	5–10	204	Fr.	Alameda, CA (Encinal HS)
32	Dave Wilson	LB	6–1	222	Jr.	Powell, WY (Powell HS)
33	Tommy Smith	LB	6–1	218	So.	Atlanta, GA (North Atlanta High School)
34	Kirby Moore	WR	6–2	196	So.	Prosser, WA (Prosser HS)
35	Kyle Brotzman	K/P	5-10	201	Sr.	Meridian, ID (Meridian HS)
36	Aaron Tevis	LB	6–3	228	Jr.	Tucson, AZ (Canyon Del Oro HS)
37	Ebenezer Makinde	CB	5–11	164	Fr.	Phoenix, AZ (Paradise Valley HS)
38	Raphiel Lambert	CB	5–11	200	So.	Portland, Oregon (Jesuit High School)
39	Drew Wright	FB	5–9	188	So.	Nampa, ID (Vallivue HS)
41	Kharyee Marshall	DE	6–1	207	Fr.	Phoenix, AZ (Washington HS)
41	Dan Goodale	K/P	5-9	182	Fr.	Boise, ID (Timberline HS)
42	Matt Wilson	LB	6–1	212	Jr.	Powell, WY (Powell HS)
43	Ricky Tjong-A-Tjoe	DT	6–3	282	Fr.	Netherlands, Amsterdam (Boise HS, in Boise, ID)
44	Allen Mooney	S	5–10	211	Fr.	Maple Valley, WA (O'Dea HS)
45	Daron Mackey	LB	5–11	233	Sr.	Bakersfield, CA (Bakersfield College) (West HS)
47	Dan Paul	LB/FB	6–0	241	Jr.	Boring, OR (Sam Barlow HS)
48	J.C. Percy	LB	6–0	214	So.	Blackfoot, ID (Blackfoot HS)
49	Brad Elkin	P	6-2	201	Sr.	Tacoma, WA (Bellarmine Prep HS)
50	J.P. Nisby	DT	6–1	305	Jr.	Stockton, CA (Saint Mary's HS)
51	James Crawford	LS	6–1	207	So.	Westlake Village, CA (Oaks Christian HS)
52	Derrell Acrey	LB	6–1	235	Sr.	East Highland, CA (Redlands East Valley HS)
54	Michael Ames	OL	6–4	281	So.	Boise, ID (Centennial HS)
55	Chuck Hayes	DT	6–2	290	Jr.	Auroro, CO (Eaglecrest HS)
56	John Michael Davis	LB	6–0	210	Fr.	Santa Margarita, CA (Las Flores HS)
57	Garrett Pendergast	OL	6–4	271	Jr.	Whittier, CA (Servite HS)
59	Will Lawrence	OL	6–2	293	Sr.	Upper Marlboro, MD (CH Flowers HS)
61	Joe Kellogg	OL	6–2	305	So.	Scottsdale, AZ (Saguaro HS)
62	Kevin Sapien	OL	6–4	286	Sr.	Torrance, CA (West Torrance HS)
64	Brenel Myers	OL	6–2	267	So.	Houston, TX (Westfield HS)
65	Matt Paradis	DT	6–1	275	Fr.	Council, ID (Council HS)
66	Thomas Byrd	C	5–11	284	Jr.	San Pablo, CA (McClymond HS)
68	David Cushing	LB	6–1	277	Fr.	Caldwell, ID (Vallivue HS)
70	Zach Waller	OL	6–5	289	Jr.	Elk Grove, CA (Franklin HS)
71	Cory Yriarte	OL	6–1	281	Jr.	Palmdale, CA (Oaks Christian HS)
72	Matt Slater	OT	6–4	290	Sr.	St. Paul, MN (Cretin Derham Hall HS)
73	Nate Potter	OL	6–6	293	Jr.	Boise, ID (Timberline HS)
75	Faraji Wright	OT	6–3	284	So.	Vallejo, CA (Berkeley HS)
76	Jake Broyles	OL	6–4	257	Fr.	Henderson, NV (Foothill HS)
77	Spencer Gerke	OL	6–3	290	Fr.	Boise, ID (Bishop Kelly)
78	Charles Leno	OT	6–3	249	Fr.	Oakland, CA (San Leandro HS)
79	Bronson Durrant	OL	6–3	266	So.	Eugene, OR (Marist)
80	Kyle Efaw	TE	6–4	229	Jr.	Boise, ID (Capital HS)
81	Nick Alexander	DE	6–4	237	Fr.	Los Angeles, CA (Crenshaw HS)
82	Geraldo Hiwat	WR	6–4	189	Fr.	Netherlands, Amsterdam (Capital HS in Boise, ID)
83	Sean King	TE	6–3	240	Sr.	Boise, ID (College of the Redwoods) (Timberline HS)
84	Jimmy Pavel	K	5–9	212	So.	Molalla, OR (Central Catholic HS)
85	Tommy Gallarda	TE	6–5	249	Sr.	Brea, CA (Brea Olinda HS)
87	Gabe Linehan	TE	6–3	213	Fr.	Banks, OR (Banks, OR)
88	Chandler Koch	TE	6–2	244	So.	Flower Mound, TX (Flower Mound HS)
89	Tyler Shoemaker	WR	6–1	207	Jr.	Meridian, ID (Mountain View HS)
90	Billy Winn	DT	6–4	288	Jr.	Las Vegas, NV (Las Vegas HS)
91	Greg Grimes	DT	6–0	271	So.	Sacramento, CA (Inderkum HS)
92	Shea McClellin	DE	6–3	262	Jr.	Caldwell, ID (Marsing HS)
93	Justin Jungblut	DT	6–4	241	Fr.	Scottsdale, AZ (Saguaro HS)
94	Byron Hout	DE	6–0	241	Jr.	Coeur d' Alene, ID (Lake City HS)
95	Darren Koontz	DE	6–3	254	So.	Los Alamitos, CA (Los Alamitos High School)
96	Jarrell Root	DE	6–3	259	Jr.	Boise, ID (Capital HS)
97	Chase Baker	DT	6–1	296	Jr.	Rocklin, CA (Rocklin HS)
98	Ryan Winterswyk	DE	6–4	263	Sr.	La Habra, CA (La Habra HS)
99	Michael Atkinson	DT	6–0	332	So.	Windsor, Ontario, Canada (Catholic Central High School)

== Coaching staff ==
Name	Position	Alma mater	Years at BSU
Chris Petersen	Head Coach	UC Davis ('88)	8 (5 as Head Coach)
Brent Pease	Assistant head coach Wide receivers	Montana ('90)	5
Bryan Harsin	Offensive coordinator Quarterbacks	Boise State ('00)	10 (5 as OC)
Pete Kwiatkowski	Defensive coordinator	Boise State ('90)	13 (first as DC)
Bob Gregory	Assistant coach	Washington State ('87)	2 (first since 2001)
Scott Huff	Offensive lines	Boise State ('02)	5
Marcel Yates	Secondary	Boise State ('00)	8
Chris Strausser	Tight ends Run Game Coordinator	Chico State ('89)	9
Jeff Choate	Special teams Linebackers	Montana-Western ('93)	5
Keith Bhonapha	Running backs	Hawaii ('03)	2
