= 2008 All-Big East Conference football team =

American college football all-star team

The 2008 All-Big East Conference football team consists of American football players from the Big East Conference who were chosen as the best at their respective positions during the 2008 NCAA Division I FBS football season. The official All-Big East teams in 2008 were chosen by votes of the conference's head football coaches. The coaches chose both first- and second-team players. UConn running back Donald Brown was chosen as the Big East offensive player of the year, and Pitt linebacker Scott McKillop was chosen as the Big East defensive player of the year. Cincinnati head coach Brian Kelly was chosen as the Big East coach of the year.

== Honorees by team ==
2008 Big East Conference football standings
	Conf.			Overall
Team	W		L	W		L
No. 17 Cincinnati $	6	–	1	11	–	3
Pittsburgh	5	–	2	9	–	4
No. 23 West Virginia	5	–	2	9	–	4
Rutgers	5	–	2	8	–	5
Connecticut	3	–	4	8	–	5
South Florida	2	–	5	8	–	5
Louisville	1	–	6	5	–	7
Syracuse	1	–	6	3	–	9
$ – BCS representative as conference champion; Rankings from AP Poll

Cincinnati. The Cincinnati Bearcats won the conference championship and compiled an 11–3 record. Five Cincinnati player received first-team All-Big East honors: wide receiver and return specialist Mardy Gilyard (first team at both positions); defensive lineman Connor Barwin; cornerback Mike Mickens; safety Brandon Underwood; and punter Kevin Huber. Gilyard was also selected as the Big East special teams player of the year, and Brian Kelly was chosen as the Big East coach of the year. Four other Cincinnati players, including quarterback Tony Pike, were named to the All-Big East second team. Huber was also a consensus first-team pick on the 2008 All-America college football team.

Pittsburgh. The Pittsburgh Panthers tied for second place and placed five players on the first team: running back LeSean McCoy; tight end Nate Byham; offensive guard C. J. Davis; linebacker Scott McKillop; and kicker Conor Lee. McKillop was also selected as the defensive player of the year. Two other Pitt players, defensive end Greg Romeus and cornerback Aaron Berry, were named to the second team. McKillop also won first-team honors on the 2008 All-America college football team.

West Virginia. The West Virginia Mountaineers tied for second place and placed three players on the first team: quarterback Pat White; offensive tackle Ryan Stanchek; and linebacker Mortty Ivy. Six other West Virginia players, including slotback Jock Sanders, tailback Noel Devine, and kicker Pat McAfee, were named to the second team. McAfee was also chosen by CBS as a first-team All-American.

Rutgers. The Rutgers Scarlet Knights finished in a three-way tie for second place and placed two players on the first team: wide receiver Kenny Britt and free safety Courtney Greene. Britt tallied 81 receptions for 1,252 yards, ranking second nationally with an average of 113.8 receiving yards per game. Greene started a school-record 50 consecutive games. Three Rugers players, including eefensive end Jamaal Westerman, were named to the second team.

Connecticut. The Connecticut Huskies finished in fifth place and placed four players on the first team: running back Donald Brown; offensive tackle Will Beatty; defensive lineman Cody Brown; and cornerback Darius Butler. Brown, who led the nation with 1,822 rushing yards, and was selected as the Big East offensive player of the year. Two additional UConn players were named to the second team. Brown also won first-team honors on the 2008 All-America college football team.

South Florida. The South Florida Bulls finished in sixth place. Two of their players, defensive lineman George Selvie and linebacker Tyrone McKenzie, were selected to the All-Big East first team. Four additional South Florida players were named to the second team.

Louisville. The Louisville Cardinals tied for last place. Two Louisville players, offensive guard George Bussey and center Eric Wood, were named to the first team. Running back Victor Anderson was selected as the Big East rookie of the year.

Syracuse. The Syracuse Orange tied for last place. Defensive lineman Arthur Jones was the only Syracuse player named to the first team. Two others, including tailback Curtis Brinkley, were named to the second team.

== Offensive selections ==
=== Quarterbacks ===
- Pat White, West Virginia (Coaches-1)
- Tony Pike, Cincinnati (Coaches-2)

=== Running backs ===
- Donald Brown, UConn (Coaches-1)
- LeSean McCoy, Pitt (Coaches-1)
- Victor Anderson, Louisville (Coaches-2)
- Curtis Brinkley, Syracuse (Coaches-2)
- Noel Devine, West Virginia (Coaches-2)

=== Wide receivers ===
- Mardy Gilyard, Cincinnati (Coaches-1)
- Kenny Britt, Rutger (Coaches-1)
- Dominick Goodman, Cincinnati (Coaches-2)
- Doug Beaumont, Louisville (Coaches-2)
- Jock Sanders, West Virginia (Coaches-2)

=== Tight ends ===
- Nate Byham, Pitt (Coaches-1)

=== Offensive tackles ===
- Will Beatty, UConn (Coaches-1)
- Ryan Stanchek, West Virginia (Coaches-1)
- Marc Dile, South Florida (Coaches-2)
- Anthony Davis, Rutgers (Coaches-2)
- Trevor Canfield, Cincinnati (Coaches-2)

=== Offensive guard ===
- C. J. Davis, Pitt (Coaches-1)
- George Bussey, Louisville (Coaches-1)
- Matt Huners, South Florida (Coaches-2)
- Ryan Durand, Syracuse (Coaches-2)

=== Centers ===
- Eric Wood, Louisville (Coaches-1)
- Mike Dent, West Virginia (Coaches-2)

== Defensive selections ==
=== Defensive line ===
- Connor Barwin, Cincinnati (Coaches-1)
- Cody Brown, UConn (Coaches-1)
- George Selvie, South Florida (Coaches-1)
- Arthur Jones, Syracuse (Coaches-1)
- Terrill Byrd, Cincinnati (Coaches-2)
- Greg Romeus, Pitt (Coaches-2)
- Jamaal Westerman, Rutgers (Coaches-2)
- Scooter Berry, West Virginia (Coaches-2)

=== Linebackers ===
- Scott McKillop, Pitt (Coaches-1)
- Tyrone McKenzie, South Florida (Coaches-1)
- Mortty Ivy, West Virginia (Coaches-1)
- Scott Lutrus, UConn (Coaches-2)
- Jon Dempsey, Louisville (Coaches-2)
- Ryan D'Imperio, Rutgers (Coaches-2)

=== Cornerbacks ===
- Mike Mickens, Cincinnati (Coaches-1)
- Darius Butler, UConn (Coaches-1)
- Aaron Berry, Pitt (Coaches-2)
- Ellis Lankster, West Virginia (Coaches-2)

=== Safeties ===
- Brandon Underwood, Cincinnati (Coaches-1)
- Courtney Greene, Rutgers (Coaches-1)
- Robert Vaughn, UConn (Coaches-2)
- Carlton Williams, South Florida (Coaches-2)

== Special teams ==
=== Kickers ===
- Conor Lee, Pitt (Coaches-1)
- Pat McAfee, West Virginia (Coaches-2)

=== Punters ===
- Kevin Huber, Cincinnati (Coaches-1)
- Pat McAfee (Coaches-2)

=== Return specialist ===
- Mardy Gilyard, Cincinnati (Coaches-1)
- Trent Guy, Louisville (Coaches-2)

== Individual awards ==
- Offensive player of the year - Donald Brown, UConn, running back
- Defensive player of the year - Scott McKillop, Pitt, linebacker
- Special teams player of the year - Mardy Gilyard, Cincinnati, wide receiver
- Rookie of the year - Victor Anderson, Louisville, running back
- Coach of the year - Brian Kelly

== Key ==
Coaches, selected by the conference coaches

== See also ==
- 2008 All-America college football team
