= Al Blades Jr. =

American football safety (born 1999)

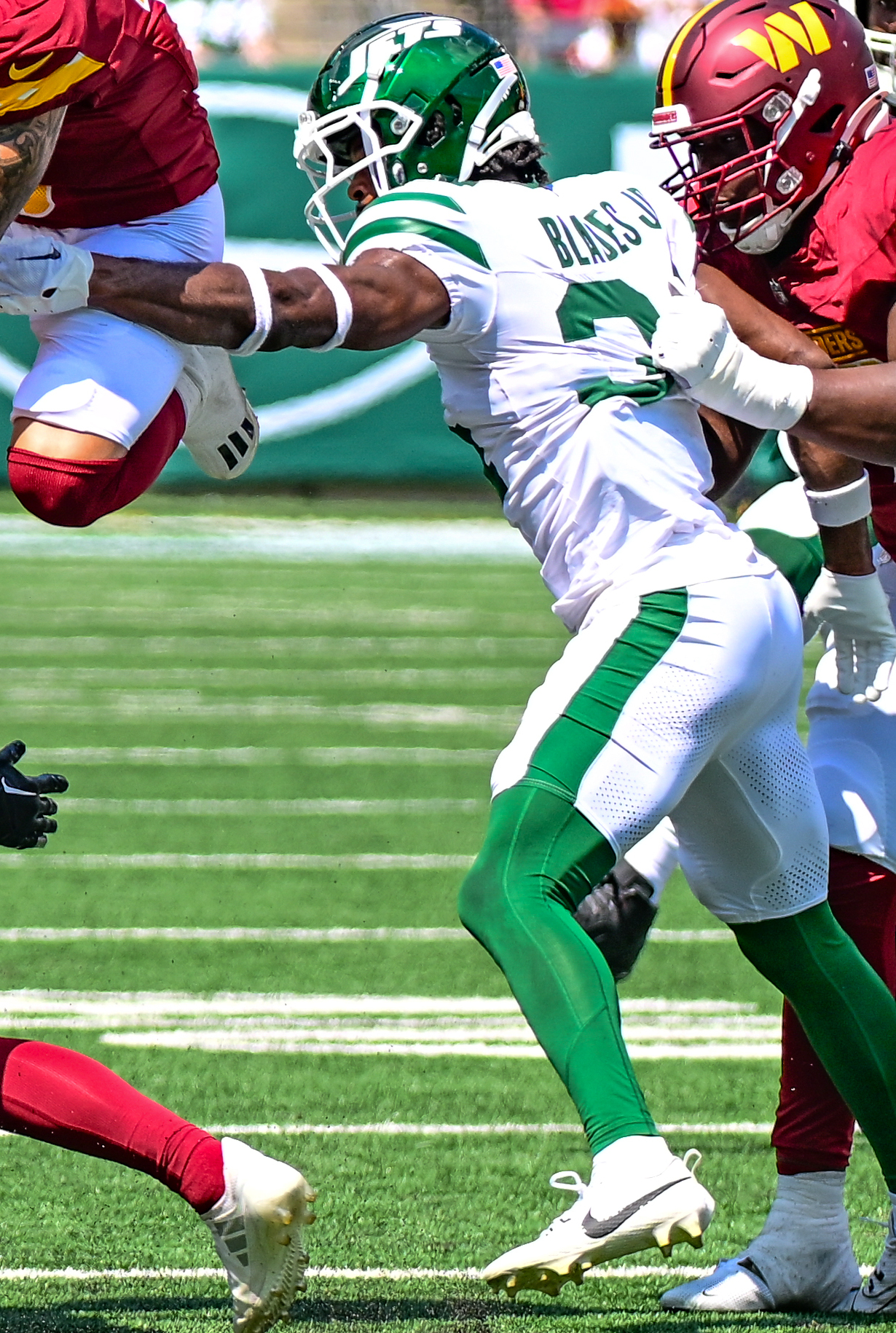
- Blades with the New York Jets in 2024

Profile
- Position: Safety

Personal information
- Born: October 24, 1999 (age 27); Fort Lauderdale, Florida, U.S.
- Listed height: 6 ft 1 in (1.85 m)
- Listed weight: 195 lb (88 kg)

Career information
- High school: St. Thomas Aquinas High School (Fort Lauderdale, Florida)
- College: Miami (FL) (2018–2022); Duke (2023)
- NFL draft: 2024: undrafted

Career history
- New York Jets (2024)*
- * Offseason or practice squad member only

Al Blades Jr. (born October 24, 1999) is an American professional football safety. He played college football for the Miami Hurricanes and Duke Blue Devils.

== Early life ==
Blades Jr attended St. Thomas Aquinas High School in Fort Lauderdale, Florida. He committed to the University of Miami to play college football.

== College career ==
=== Miami ===
As a true freshman in 2018, Blades Jr. recorded 13 tackles in 13 games. He played mainly on special teams.

In 2019, Blades Jr. recorded 36 tackles and 2 interceptions in 13 games in which he started 7 of those.

In 2020, he recorded 29 tackles and two interceptions. At the end of the season, Blades Jr. was diagnosed with myocarditis.

=== Duke ===
On December 12, 2022, Blades had announced that he was transferring to the Duke Blue Devils.

== Professional career ==
Pre-draft measurables
Height	Weight	Arm length	Hand span	40-yard dash	10-yard split	20-yard split	20-yard shuttle	Three-cone drill	Vertical jump	Broad jump	Bench press
6 ft 0 3/8 in (1.84 m)	194 lb (88 kg)	31 7/8 in (0.81 m)	9 1/4 in (0.23 m)	4.57 s	1.56 s	2.57 s	4.17 s	6.86 s	33.5 in (0.85 m)	10 ft 0 in (3.05 m)	8 reps
All values from Pro Day

Blades signed with the New York Jets as an undrafted free agent on May 3, 2024. He was waived on August 27.

== Personal life ==
Blades is the son of the late American football safety Al Blades. He is the nephew of former Seattle Seahawks wide receiver Brian Blades and former Detroit Lions safety Bennie Blades, and cousin of H. B. Blades, who played four seasons for the Washington Redskins in the NFL.
