= Big East Conference football individual awards =

The Big East Conference gave five football awards at the conclusion of every season. The awards were first given in 1991 following the conference's first football season, and last given in 2012 before the conference was restructured as the American Athletic Conference. The five awards included Offensive Player of the Year, Defensive Player of the Year, Special Teams Player of the Year, Rookie of the Year, and Coach of the Year. Recipients were selected by the votes of the conference's eight head coaches.

Award recipients included Heisman Trophy winners, NFL first-round draft picks, and NFL All-Star selections. The Miami Hurricanes were the most successful team through the school's tenure with the conference from 1991 to 2004, winning six awards for offensive players, seven for defense, four for special teams, three for Rookie of the Year, and six for Coach of the Year. Every conference member received at least two awards.

Donovan McNabb of Syracuse is the only player to win more than two awards; he was named Rookie of the Year in 1995 and Offensive Player of the Year in 1996, 1997, and 1998. Frank Beamer of Virginia Tech, Dennis Erickson of Miami, and Brian Kelly of Cincinnati were each Coach of the Year three times.

== Offensive Player of the Year ==
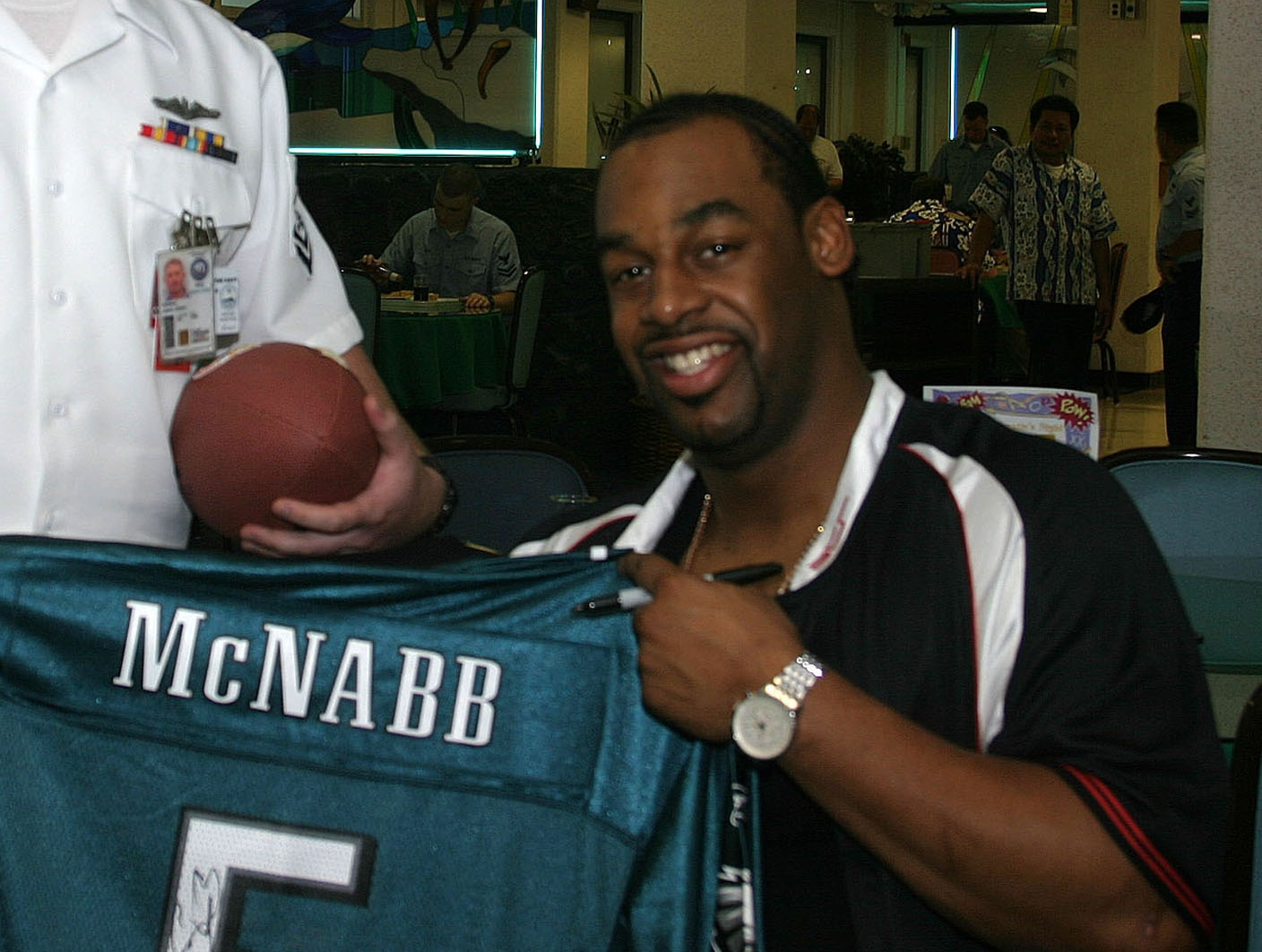
Donovan McNabb is the only player to be awarded three times.

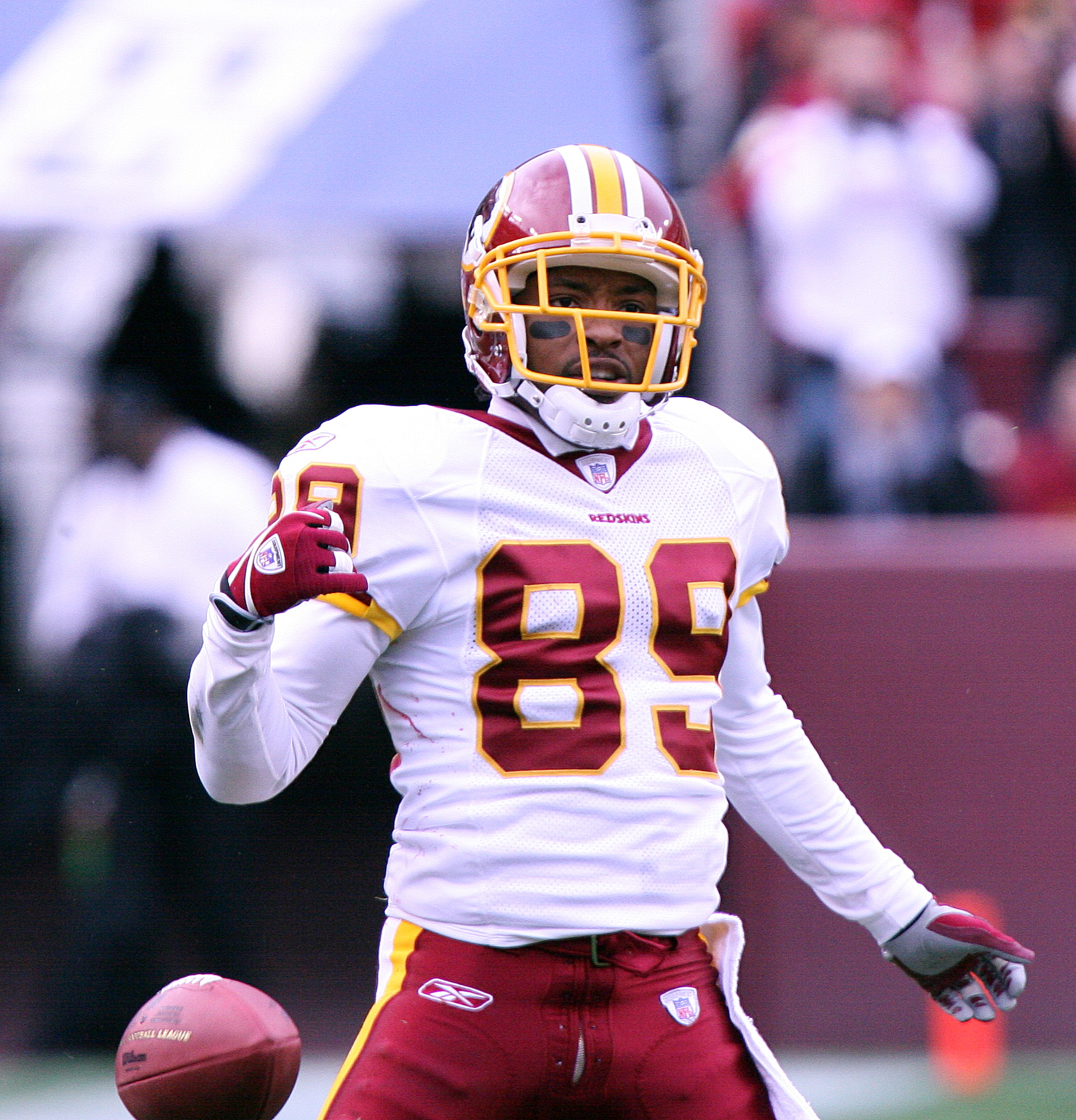
Santana Moss (pictured) and Antonio Bryant in 2000 were the first wide receivers to win.

The Offensive Player of the Year was awarded to the player voted most-outstanding at an offensive position. The first two awards were given to quarterback Gino Torretta of the University of Miami. In 1992, Torretta was a unanimous selection, the first of only two players to receive that distinction as of 2012. The other unanimous selection was running back Jordan Todman of Connecticut in 2010. There have been three ties: in 1996, 2001, and 2002, and a three-way tie in 2001. Besides Torretta, quarterbacks Ken Dorsey of Miami and Pat White of West Virginia have both been awarded twice; Dorsey's awards in 2001 and 2002 were both ties. Donovan McNabb was selected three times and became the second overall pick in the 1999 NFL draft. Miami has received the most awards, six before leaving the conference in 2004. Only South Florida (who joined in 2005) and Temple (which joined in 1991, was expelled after the 2004 season, and returned in 2012) have no offensive winners.

Of the 27 winners, there were 15 quarterbacks, eight running backs, three wide receivers, and one tight end. Nine seniors, seven juniors, nine sophomores, and two freshmen were honored.

=== Winners ===
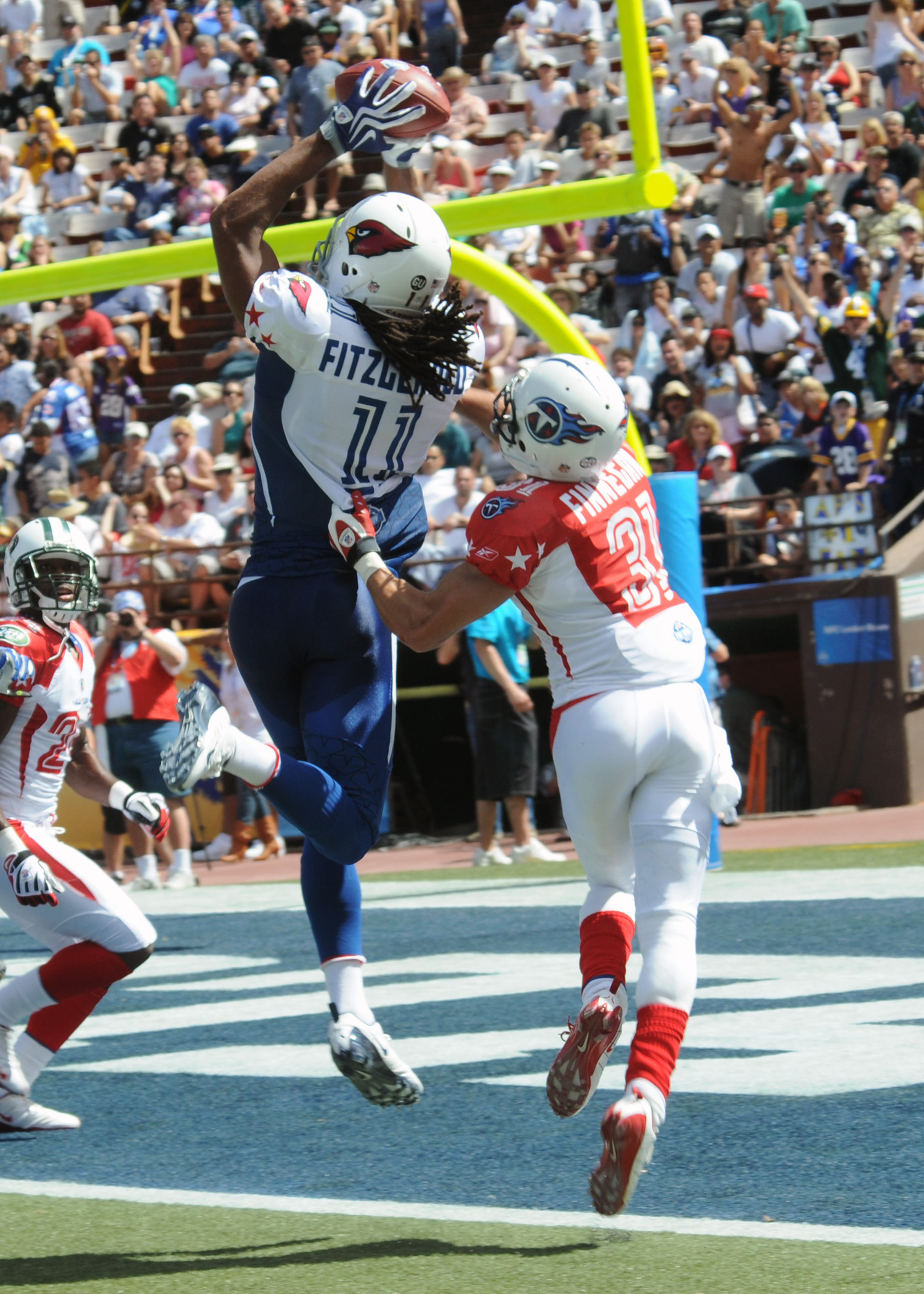
Larry Fitzgerald was the second receiver from Pittsburgh, and third receiver overall to win.

*	Unanimous selection
^{†}	Co-Player of the Year
Player (X)	Denotes the number of times the player has been selected

Positions key
QB	Quarterback	RB	Running back	TE	Tight end	WR	Wide receiver
Class key
Fr	Freshman	So	Sophomore	Jr	Junior	Sr	Senior

Season	Player	School	Position	Class
1991	Gino Torretta	Miami	QB	Jr
1992*	Gino Torretta (2)	Miami	QB	Sr
1993	Glenn Foley	Boston College	QB	Sr
1994	Billy West	Pittsburgh	RB	So
1995	Marco Battaglia	Rutgers	TE	Sr
1996^{†}	Jim Druckenmiller	Virginia Tech	QB	Sr
1996^{†}	Donovan McNabb	Syracuse	QB	So
1997	Donovan McNabb (2)	Syracuse	QB	Jr
1998	Donovan McNabb (3)	Syracuse	QB	Sr
1999	Michael Vick	Virginia Tech	QB	Fr
2000^{†}	Antonio Bryant	Pittsburgh	WR	So
2000^{†}	Santana Moss	Miami	WR	Sr
2000^{†}	Lee Suggs	Virginia Tech	RB	So
2001^{†}	William Green	Boston College	RB	Jr
2001^{†}	Ken Dorsey	Miami	QB	Jr
2002^{†}	Ken Dorsey (2)	Miami	QB	Sr
2002^{†}	Willis McGahee	Miami	RB	So
2003	Larry Fitzgerald	Pittsburgh	WR	So
2004	Rasheed Marshall	West Virginia	QB	Sr
2005	Brian Brohm	Louisville	QB	So
2006	Pat White	West Virginia	QB	So
2007	Pat White (2)	West Virginia	QB	Jr
2008	Donald Brown	Connecticut	RB	Jr
2009	Dion Lewis	Pittsburgh	RB	Fr
2010	Jordan Todman	Connecticut	RB	Jr
2011	Isaiah Pead	Cincinnati	RB	Sr
2012	Teddy Bridgewater	Louisville	QB	So

=== Winners by school ===
School (First season)	Winners	Years
Miami (1991)^{[a]}	6	1991, 1992, 2000^{†}, 2001^{†}, 2002^{†}, 2002^{†}
Pittsburgh (1991)^{[b]}	4	1994, 2000^{†}, 2003, 2009
Syracuse (1991)^{[b]}	3	1996^{†}, 1997, 1998
Virginia Tech (1991)^{[c]}	3	1996^{†}, 1999, 2000^{†}
West Virginia (1991)^{[d]}	3	2004, 2006, 2007
Boston College (1991)^{[e]}	2	1993, 2001^{†}
Connecticut (2004)	2	2008, 2010
Louisville (2005)^{[f]}	2	2005, 2012
Cincinnati (2005)	1	2011
Rutgers (1991)^{[g]}	1	1995
South Florida (2005)	0	
Temple (1991)^{[h]}	0	

== Defensive Player of the Year ==
The Defensive Player of the Year award was given 26 times, with ties in 1991, 2001, 2009, and 2011. Of the 26 winners, 16 were defensive linemen. Seven linebackers and three safeties were honored. Of the recipients, 17 were seniors, eight juniors, and George Selvie the only sophomore.

The first award in 1991 was a tie between Darrin Smith, a Miami linebacker, and George Rooks, a defensive lineman from Syracuse. Miami then won three consecutive awards between 1992 and 1994. Only two players have won the award twice—Corey Moore in 1998 and 1999, and Khaseem Greene, who shared the award in 2011 and won it outright in 2012.

Like Offensive Player of the Year, Miami won the most defensive awards as well, with seven. Pittsburgh follows with the second most awards with five, including the 2009 Co-Defensive Players of the Year, which is the only occasion where two teammates have been co-selected in the same season. During Temple's first tenure in Big East football from 1991 to 2004, its only conference award was when Dan Klecko won Defensive Player of the Year honors in 2002. Of the original 1991 members, Pittsburgh took the longest to win the defensive award, first winning with H.B. Blades in 2006. Pittsburgh won again with another linebacker, Scott McKillop, in 2008. The only member that has failed to win this award is Connecticut, which did not join Big East football until 2004.

=== Winners ===
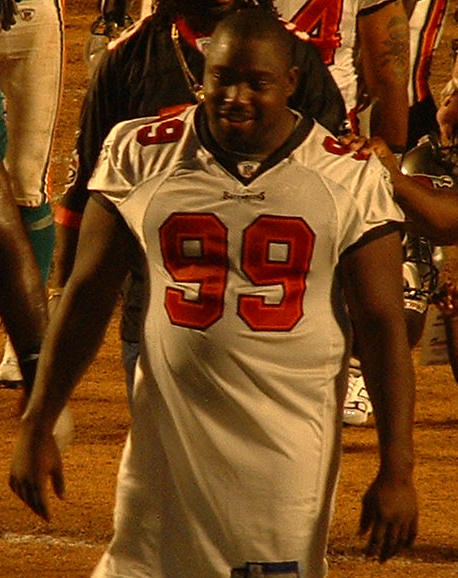
Warren Sapp of Miami won the award in 1994.

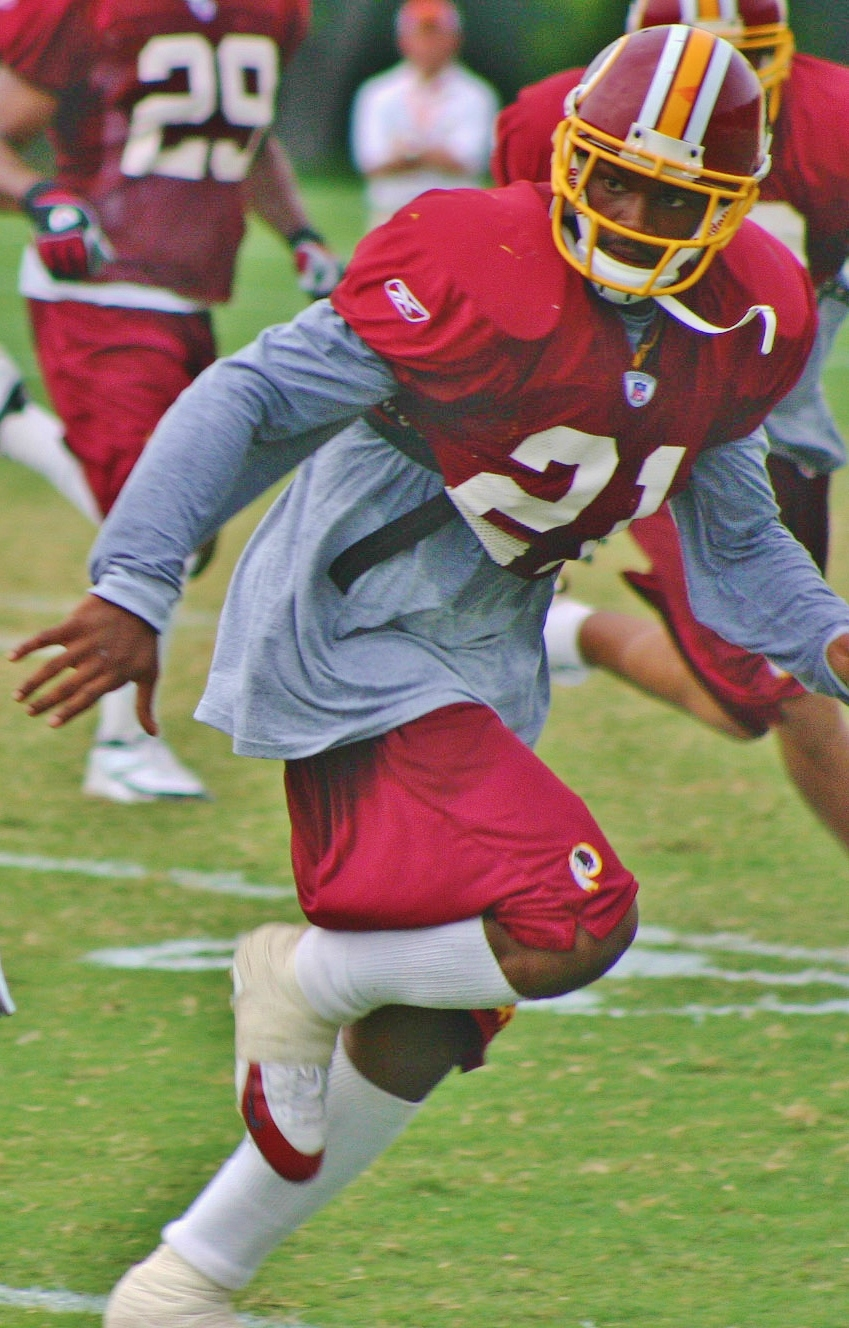
Sean Taylor became the second safety to win in 2003.

*	Unanimous selection
^{†}	Co-Player of the Year
Player (X)	Denotes the number of times the player has been selected

Positions key
DE	Defensive end	DT	Defensive tackle	LB	Linebacker	S	Safety
Class key
Fr	Freshman	So	Sophomore	Jr	Junior	Sr	Senior

Season	Player	School	Position	Class
1991^{†}	Darrin Smith	Miami	LB	Jr
1991^{†}	George Rooks	Syracuse	DT	Sr
1992	Micheal Barrow	Miami	LB	Sr
1993	Kevin Patrick	Miami	DE	Sr
1994	Warren Sapp	Miami	DL	Jr
1995	Cornell Brown	Virginia Tech	DE	Jr
1996	Canute Curtis	West Virginia	DE/DT	Sr
1997	Donovin Darius	Syracuse	S	Sr
1998	Corey Moore	Virginia Tech	DE	Jr
1999*	Corey Moore (2)	Virginia Tech	DE	Sr
2000*	Dan Morgan	Miami	LB	Sr
2001^{†}	Ed Reed	Miami	S	Sr
2001^{†}	Dwight Freeney	Syracuse	DE	Sr
2002	Dan Klecko	Temple	DL	Sr
2003	Sean Taylor	Miami	S	Jr
2004	Mathias Kiwanuka	Boston College	DE	Jr
2005	Elvis Dumervil	Louisville	DE	Sr
2006	H.B. Blades	Pittsburgh	LB	Sr
2007	George Selvie	South Florida	DE	So
2008	Scott McKillop	Pittsburgh	LB	Sr
2009^{†}	Greg Romeus	Pittsburgh	DE	Jr
2009^{†}	Mick Williams	Pittsburgh	DT	Sr
2010	Jabaal Sheard	Pittsburgh	DE	Sr
2011^{†}	Khaseem Greene	Rutgers	LB	Jr
2011^{†}	Derek Wolfe	Cincinnati	DT	Sr
2012	Khaseem Greene (2)	Rutgers	LB	Sr

=== Winners by school ===
School (First season)	Winners	Years
Miami (1991)^{[a]}	7	1991^{†}, 1992, 1993, 1994, 2000, 2001^{†}, 2003
Pittsburgh (1991)^{[b]}|	5	2006, 2008, 2009^{†}, 2009^{†}, 2010
Syracuse (1991)^{[b]}	3	1991^{†}, 1997, 2001^{†}
Virginia Tech (1991)^{[c]}	3	1995, 1998, 1999
Rutgers (1991)^{[g]}	2	2011^{†}, 2012
Boston College (1991)^{[e]}	1	2004
Cincinnati (2005)	1	2011^{†}
Louisville (2005)^{[f]}	1	2005
South Florida (2005)	1	2007
Temple (1991)^{[h]}	1	2002
West Virginia (1991)^{[d]}	1	1996
Connecticut (2004)	0	

== Special Teams Player of the Year ==
The Special Teams Player of the Year award was given to the player voted best on special teams. The recipient was either be a placekicker, punter, returner, or a position known as a gunner. The first winner was Kevin Williams, a returner from Miami. Andy Lee, a Pittsburgh punter, and Cincinnati kick returner Mardy Gilyard were the only players to receive the award more than once.

There were 24 recipients, with ties in 2002 and 2003. Of the award recipients, 12 were seniors, nine juniors, and three sophomores. Three placekickers won the award, most recently Virginia Tech's Shayne Graham in 1999. Todd Sauerbrun was the first punter to win after he was a unanimous selection in 1994.

Notably, Temple players received both the Special Teams Player of the Year and Rookie of the Year (see below) awards in 2012, the first year of the Owls' last Big East tenure. During Temple's previous tenure in Big East football from 1991 to 2004, the Owls received only one conference award.

=== Winners ===
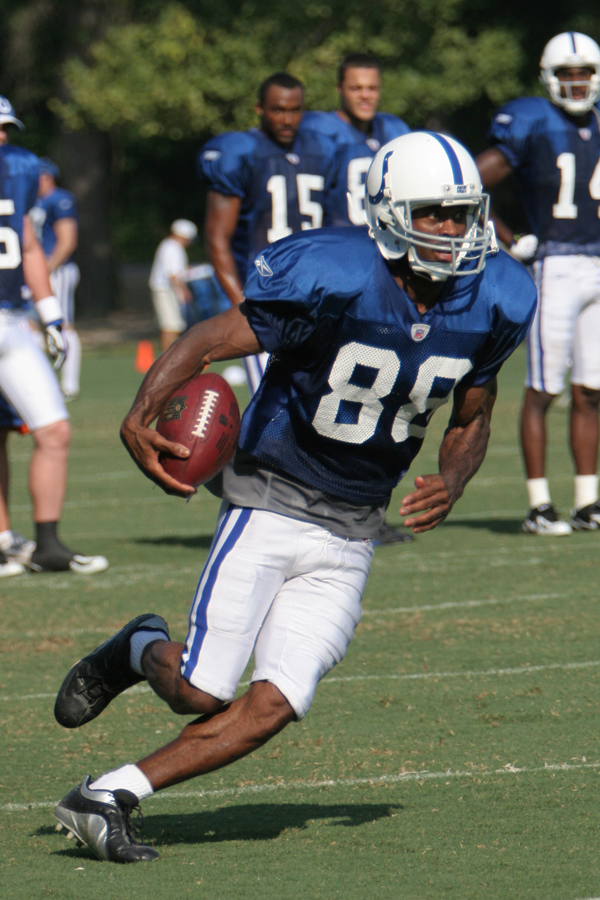
Marvin Harrison won as a returner in 1995.

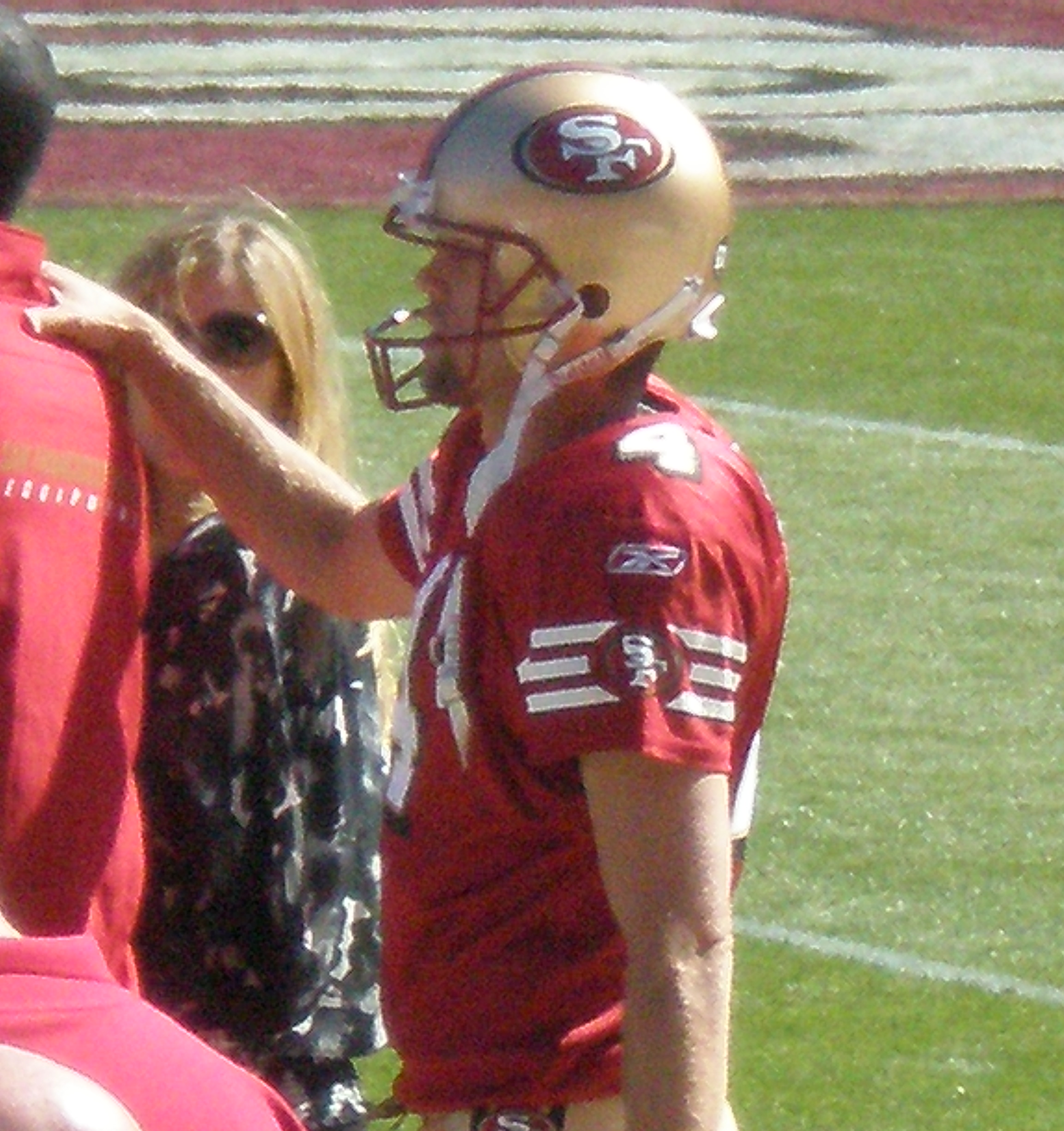
Andy Lee was the first multiple winner, winning in 2002 and 2003.

*	Unanimous selection
^{†}	Co-Player of the Year
Player (X)	Denotes the number of times the player has been selected

Positions key
K	Placekicker	KR	Kick returner	P	Punter	PR	Punt returner	RS	Return specialist
Class key
Fr	Freshman	So	Sophomore	Jr	Junior	Sr	Senior		

Season	Player	School	Position	Class
1991	Kevin Williams	Miami	RS	So
1992	John Biskup	Syracuse	PK	Sr
1993	Pat O'Neill	Syracuse	P/PK	Sr
1994*	Todd Sauerbrun	West Virginia	P	Sr
1995	Marvin Harrison	Syracuse	RS	Sr
1996*	Tremain Mack	Miami	RS	Sr
1997*	Quinton Spotwood	Syracuse	KR	So
1998*	Kevin Johnson	Syracuse	KR	Sr
1999	Shayne Graham	Virginia Tech	PK	Sr
2000*	Santana Moss	Miami	PR	Sr
2001	Phillip Buchanon	Miami	PR/KR	Jr
2002^{†}	Andy Lee	Pittsburgh	P	Jr
2002^{†}	Nate Jones	Rutgers	KR	Jr
2003^{†}	Andy Lee (2)	Pittsburgh	P	Sr
2003^{†}	DeAngelo Hall	Virginia Tech	PR	Jr
2004	Adam Jones	West Virginia	RS	Jr
2005	Willie Foster	Rutgers	RS	Jr
2006	Ean Randolph	South Florida	RS	Sr
2007	Kevin Huber	Cincinnati	P	Jr
2008	Mardy Gilyard	Cincinnati	KR	Jr
2009	Mardy Gilyard (2)	Cincinnati	KR	Sr
2010	Lindsey Lamar	South Florida	KR	So
2011	Tavon Austin	West Virginia	RS	Jr
2012	Matt Brown	Temple	RS	Sr

=== Winners by school ===
School (First season)	Winners	Years
Syracuse (1991)^{[b]}	5	1992, 1993, 1995, 1997, 1998
Miami (1991)^{[a]}	4	1991, 1996, 2000, 2001
Cincinnati (2005)	3	2007, 2008, 2009
West Virginia (1991)^{[d]}	3	1994, 2004, 2011
Pittsburgh (1991)^{[b]}	2	2002^{†}, 2003^{†}
Rutgers (1991)^{[g]}	2	2002^{†}, 2005
Virginia Tech (1991)^{[c]}	2	1999, 2003^{†}
South Florida (2005)	2	2006, 2010
Temple (1991)^{[h]}	1	2012
Louisville (2005)^{[f]}	0	
Connecticut (2004)	0	

== Rookie of the Year ==
The Rookie of the Year award was given to the conference's best freshman. Tom Tumulty from Pittsburgh was the first winner. Donovan McNabb, Michael Vick, Dion Lewis, Larry Fitzgerald, and Teddy Bridgewater also won Offensive Player of the Year honors, with Vick and Lewis winning both awards in the same season.

=== Winners ===
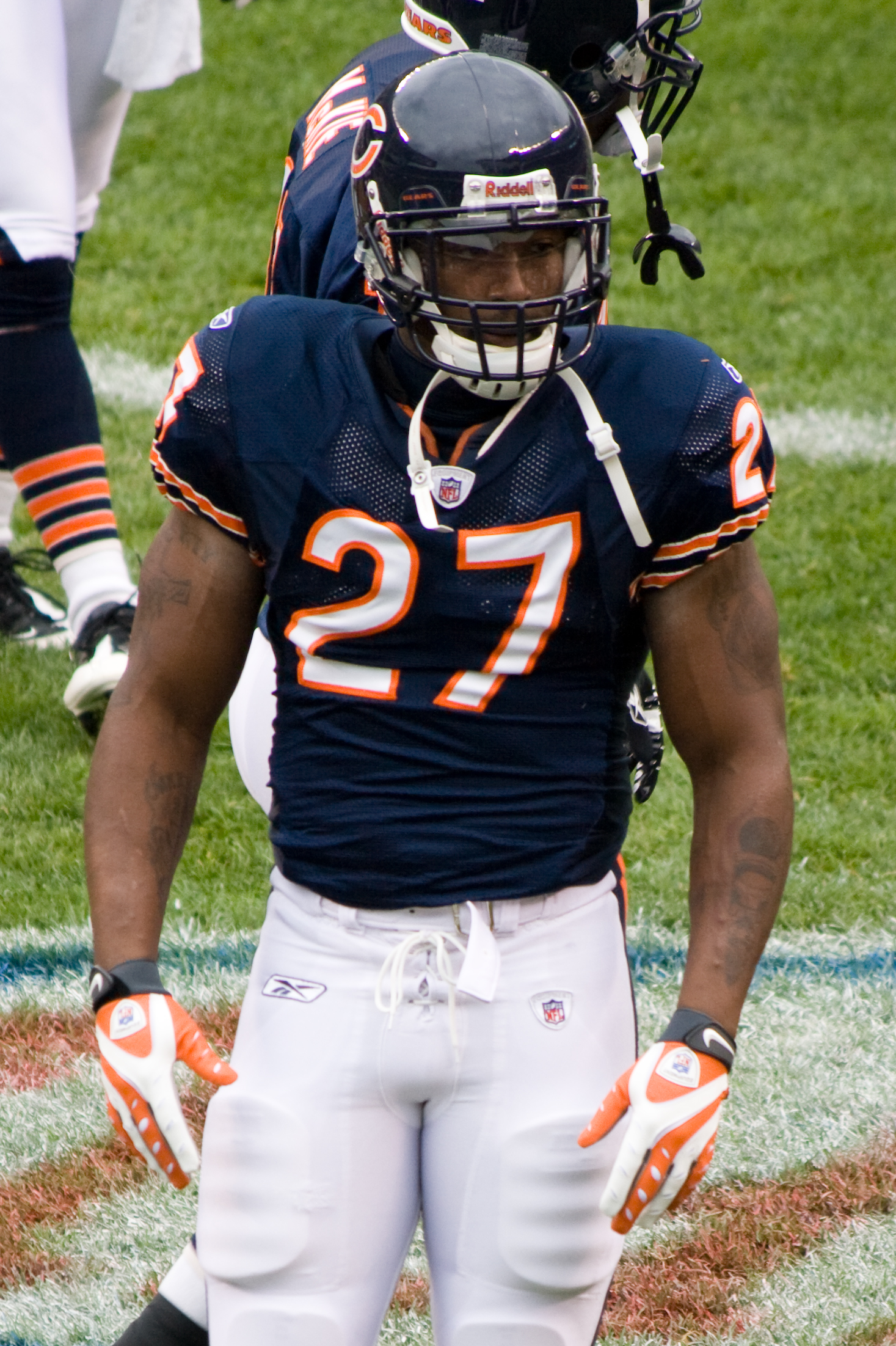
Virginia Tech's Kevin Jones was the 2001 winner.

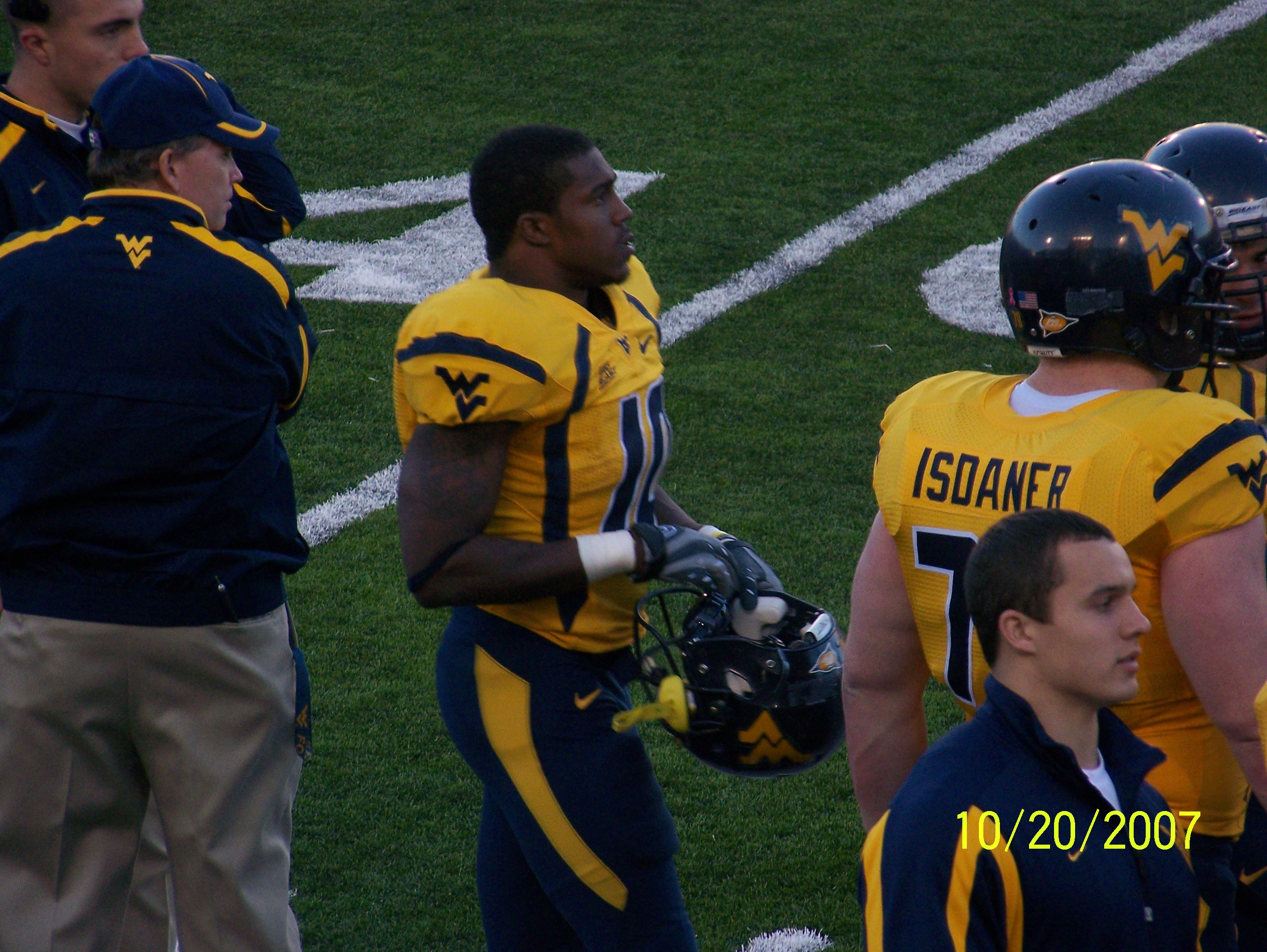
Steve Slaton (center) won in 2005.

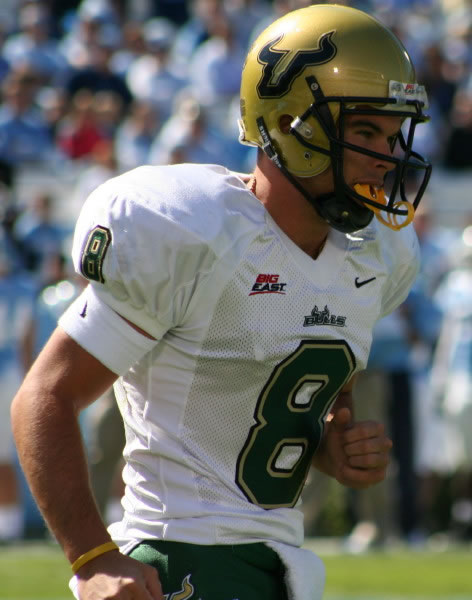
Quarterback Matt Grothe was the 2006 winner.

*	Unanimous selection
Player^{#}	Eventual Player of the Year (Offense, Defense, or Special Teams)

Positions key
DE	Defensive end	LB	Linebacker	OT	Offensive tackle	QB	Quarterback
S	Safety	RB	Running back	WR	Wide receiver		

Season	Player	School	Position
1991	Tom Tumulty	Pittsburgh	LB
1992	Bruce Presley	Rutgers	RB
1993	Terrell Willis	Rutgers	RB
1994	Kenard Lang	Miami	DE
1995*	Donovan McNabb^{#}	Syracuse	QB
1996*	Amos Zereoue	West Virginia	RB
1997	Reggie Wayne	Miami	WR
1998	Joaquin Gonzalez	Miami	OT
1999	Michael Vick^{#}^{[i]}	Virginia Tech	QB
2000	Grant Wiley	West Virginia	LB
2001	Kevin Jones	Virginia Tech	RB
2002	Larry Fitzgerald^{#}	Pittsburgh	WR
2003	Chris Henry	West Virginia	WR
2004	Brian Toal	Boston College	LB
2005	Steve Slaton	West Virginia	RB
2006	Matt Grothe	South Florida	QB
2007*	LeSean McCoy	Pittsburgh	RB
2008	Victor Anderson	Louisville	RB
2009*	Dion Lewis^{#}^{[i]}	Pittsburgh	RB
2010	Hakeem Smith	Louisville	S
2011	Teddy Bridgewater^{#}	Louisville	QB
2012	Tyler Matakevich	Temple	LB

=== Winners by school ===
School (First season)	Winners	Years
West Virginia (1991)^{[d]}	4	1996, 2000, 2003, 2005
Pittsburgh (1991)^{[b]}	4	1991, 2002, 2007, 2009
Louisville (2005)^{[f]}	3	2008, 2010, 2011
Miami (1991)^{[a]}	3	1994, 1997, 1998
Rutgers (1991)^{[g]}	2	1992, 1993
Virginia Tech (1991)^{[c]}	2	1999, 2001
Boston College (1991)^{[e]}	1	2004
Syracuse (1991)^{[b]}	1	1995
South Florida (2005)	1	2006
Temple (1991)^{[h]}	1	2012
Cincinnati (2005)	0	
Connecticut (2004)	0	

== Coach of the Year ==
Dennis Erickson won the first two awards with Miami in 1991 and 1992 after 12–0 and 11–0 seasons, respectively. Erickson, Brian Kelly (then of Cincinnati), and Frank Beamer of Virginia Tech each won the award three times. Larry Coker, Rich Rodriguez, Charlie Strong, and Walt Harris have each won twice. Miami and Rutgers had the most individual winners of the award, with three. Terry Shea of Rutgers is the only winner after a losing season, while Walt Harris was 6–6 in 1997.

The award was shared twice; both times, Strong was one of the recipients. He shared the award with Randy Edsall in 2010 and Kyle Flood in 2012. Five coaches have won the award in their first year at a school—Harris in 1997, Coker in 2001, Kelly in 2007, Strong in 2010, and Flood in 2012.

=== Winners ===
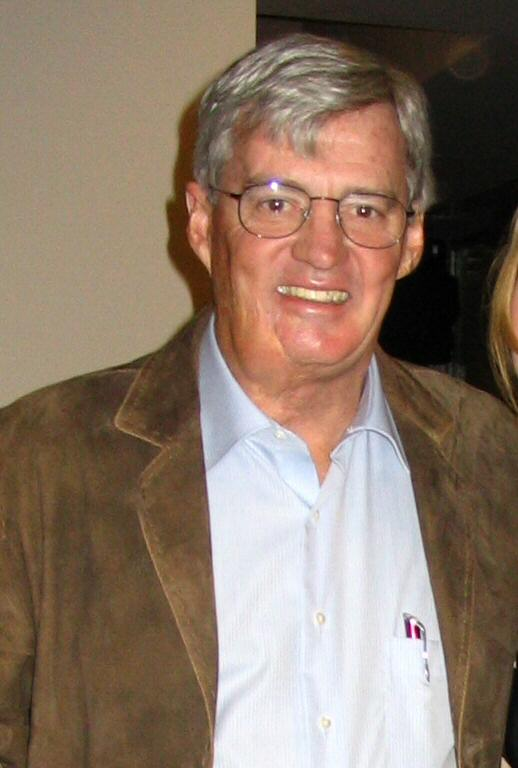
Frank Beamer won three times with Virginia Tech.

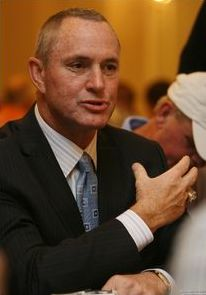
Butch Davis won with Miami in 2000.

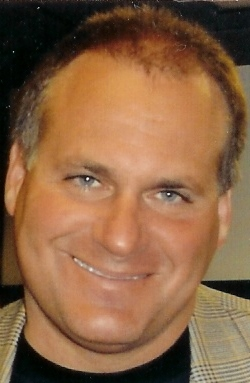
West Virginia coach Rich Rodriguez was the 2003 winner.

*	Unanimous selection
^{†}	Co-Coach of the Year
Coach (X)	Denotes the number of times the coach has been selected

Season	Coach	School	Year with school	Record	Reference
1991*	Dennis Erickson	Miami	3rd	12–0	
1992	Dennis Erickson (2)	Miami	4th	11–1	
1993*	Don Nehlen	West Virginia	14th	11–1	
1994	Dennis Erickson (3)	Miami	6th	10–2	
1995*	Frank Beamer	Virginia Tech	9th	10–2	
1996	Frank Beamer (2)	Virginia Tech	10th	10–2	
1997	Walt Harris	Pittsburgh	1st	6–6	
1998	Terry Shea	Rutgers	3rd	5–6	
1999	Frank Beamer (3)	Virginia Tech	13th	11–1	
2000	Butch Davis	Miami	6th	11–1	
2001	Larry Coker	Miami	1st	12–0	
2002	Larry Coker (2)	Miami	2nd	12–1	
2003*	Rich Rodriguez	West Virginia	3rd	8–5	
2004	Walt Harris (2)	Pittsburgh	8th	8–4	
2005	Rich Rodriguez (2)	West Virginia	5th	11–1	
2006	Greg Schiano	Rutgers	6th	11–2	
2007	Brian Kelly	Cincinnati	1st	10–3	
2008	Brian Kelly (2)	Cincinnati	2nd	11–3	
2009	Brian Kelly (3)	Cincinnati	3rd	12–0	
2010	Randy Edsall	Connecticut	12th	8–4	
2010	Charlie Strong	Louisville	1st	7–6	
2011	Butch Jones	Cincinnati	2nd	10–3	
2012	Kyle Flood	Rutgers	1st	9–4	
2012	Charlie Strong	Louisville	3rd	11–2	

=== Winners by school ===
School (First season)	Winners	Years
Miami (1991)^{[a]}	6	1991, 1992, 1994, 2000, 2001, 2002
Cincinnati (2005)	4	2007, 2008, 2009, 2011
Rutgers (1991)^{[g]}	3	1998, 2006, 2012
Virginia Tech (1991)^{[c]}	3	1995, 1996, 1999
West Virginia (1991)^{[d]}	3	1993, 2003, 2005
Louisville (2005)^{[f]}	2	2010, 2012
Pittsburgh (1991)^{[b]}	2	1997, 2004
Connecticut (2004)	1	2010
South Florida (2005)	0	
Syracuse (1991)^{[b]}	0	
Temple (1991)^{[h]}	0	

== Footnotes ==
- ^{a} Miami left the Big East for the Atlantic Coast Conference (ACC) after 2004.
- ^{b} The 2012 season was the last for Pittsburgh and Syracuse in the Big East. Both schools will join the ACC in July 2013.
- ^{c} Virginia Tech left for the ACC after 2004.
- ^{d} West Virginia left for the Big 12 Conference after 2011.
- ^{e} Boston College left for the ACC after 2005.
- ^{f} Louisville has announced it will leave for the ACC after 2013.
- ^{g} Rutgers has announced it will leave for the Big Ten after 2013.
- ^{h} Temple, then a football-only member, was expelled from the Big East after the 2004 season due to poor attendance and non-competitiveness. They spent the following two seasons as an independent before becoming a football-only member of the Mid-American Conference in 2007. The Owls returned to Big East football in 2012, and became an all-sports member of the renamed Big East in 2013.
- ^{i} Michael Vick and Dion Lewis were selected as both Rookie of the Year and Offensive Player of the Year in the same season, 1999 and 2009, respectively.

== See also ==
- American Athletic Conference football individual awards
