= Scott McKillop =

American football player (born 1986)

No. 56
- Position: Linebacker

Personal information
- Born: March 4, 1986 (age 40); Monroeville, Pennsylvania, U.S.
- Listed height: 6 ft 1 in (1.85 m)
- Listed weight: 244 lb (111 kg)

Career information
- High school: Kiski (Allegheny Township, Pennsylvania)
- College: Pittsburgh
- NFL draft: 2009: 5th round, 146th overall pick

Career history
- San Francisco 49ers (2009–2010); Buffalo Bills (2012)*
- * Offseason or practice squad member only

Awards and highlights
- First-team All-American (2008); Third-team All-American (2007); Big East Defensive Player of the Year (2008); 2× First team All-Big East (2007, 2008)

Career NFL statistics
- Total tackles: 19
- Fumble recoveries: 1
- Defensive touchdowns: 1
- Stats at Pro Football Reference

Scott Kenneth McKillop (born March 4, 1986) is an American former professional football player who was a linebacker in the National Football League (NFL). He played college football for the Pittsburgh Panthers and was selected by the San Francisco 49ers in the fifth round of the 2009 NFL draft.

== Early life ==
McKillop attended Kiski Area High School in Allegheny Township, Pennsylvania, where he was a starter for two-and-a-half seasons on both sides of the ball (linebacker and fullback). He totaled 132 tackles his senior season. At fullback McKillop rushed for 1,121 yards and 14 touchdowns over his final two seasons and helped Kiski Area to three consecutive WPIAL Class AAAA playoff berths.

Considered a three-star recruit by Rivals.com, McKillop was listed as the No. 31 outside linebacker prospects in the nation.

== College career ==
After redshirting his initial year at Pittsburgh, McKillop served as the primary backup at middle linebacker behind All-America H. B. Blades, before seizing the starting role in 2007. Still a relatively unknown player as of the beginning of his junior season, McKillop enjoyed one of the most productive seasons ever by a Pitt defender, finishing with 151 total tackles, the third highest single-season total in Pitt history. The centerpiece of a unit that is seventh nationally in total defense, yielding just 297.67 yards per game, McKillop also compiled 9.0 tackles for loss, three sacks, two fumble recoveries, an interception and seven pass breakups.

McKillop built a national reputation in 2008 and was a leading candidate for the country's top defensive awards. He recorded 126 tackles, 16.5 TFLs, four sacks and one interception, and earned 2008 All-American honors by the Football Writers Association of America and CBS Sports.

== Professional career ==
McKillop was regarded as one of the better linebackers available in the 2009 NFL draft. He was selected in the fifth round (146th overall) by the San Francisco 49ers.

Pre-draft measurables
Height	Weight	40-yard dash	10-yard split	20-yard split	20-yard shuttle	Three-cone drill	Vertical jump	Broad jump	Bench press
6 ft 0 5/8 in (1.84 m)	244 lb (111 kg)	4.70 s	1.56 s	2.75 s	4.39 s	7.00 s	35 1/2 in (0.90 m)	9 ft 11 in (3.02 m)	27 reps
All values from NFL Combine

An inside linebacker in San Francisco's 3-4 defense, McKillop competed with former veteran player Jeff Ulbrich to serve as backup to Patrick Willis and Takeo Spikes. Scott McKillop recorded his first interception in a preseason game against the Oakland Raiders. Scott scored his first NFL touchdown on October 4, 2009 against the St. Louis Rams after recovering a botched punt return in the endzone.

McKillop tore his left ACL and patellar tendon during the 2010 training camp. He was waived by the 49ers on August 30, 2011.
