= Corey Moore =

American football player (born 1979)

No. 54, 57
- Position: Linebacker

Personal information
- Born: March 20, 1979 (age 47); Eads, Tennessee, U.S.
- Listed height: 6 ft 00 in (1.83 m)
- Listed weight: 225 lb (102 kg)

Career information
- High school: Haywood (Brownsville)
- College: Virginia Tech
- NFL draft: 2000: 3rd round, 89th overall pick

Career history
- Buffalo Bills (2000); Miami Dolphins (2001)

Awards and highlights
- Lombardi Award (1999); Bronko Nagurski Trophy (1999); Dudley Award (1999); Unanimous All-American (1999); First-team All-American (1998); 2× First-team All-Big East (1998-1999); 2× Big East Defensive Player of the Year (1998-1999); Virginia Tech Sports Hall of Fame; Virginia Tech #56 retired
- Stats at Pro Football Reference
- College Football Hall of Fame

Corey Moore (born March 20, 1979) is an American former professional football player who was a linebacker in the National Football League (NFL) during the early 2000s. He played college football for the Virginia Tech Hokies, earned unanimous All-American honors and recognition as the outstanding college defensive player. A third-round pick in the 2000 NFL draft, he played professionally for the Buffalo Bills and Miami Dolphins of the NFL.

== College career ==
Moore received an athletic scholarship to attend Virginia Polytechnic Institute and State University, where he played for coach Frank Beamer's Virginia Tech Hokies football team from 1996 to 1999. Following his 1999 season, he won the Lombardi Award and Bronko Nagurski Trophy, recognizing him as college football's defensive player of the year. Moore, who was named the 1998 and 1999 Big East Conference Defensive Player of the Year, becoming the first player to win the award back-to-back. He set a league record with 17 sacks. Moore was also the first unanimous Big East Defensive Player of the Year selection and was a unanimous first-team All-Big East selection. Following the 1999 season, he became Virginia Tech's most honored football player. The senior defensive end earned the Bronko Nagurski Award as college football's defensive player of the year, and won the Lombardi Award as the college football lineman of the year. He was named Football News Defensive Player of the Year, and became just the second Virginia Tech player to be recognized as a unanimous first-team All-American. Moore had 31 sacks during his final two college seasons. He is a member of the Omega Psi Phi fraternity.

Virginia Tech retired his jersey October 23, 2010.

== Professional career ==
The Buffalo Bills selected Moore in the third round (89th pick overall) of the 2000 NFL draft, and he played for the Bills for a single season in 2000. He was later released by the Bills, and the Miami Dolphins signed him to a two-year contract.
