= Brandon McGee =

American football player (born 1990)

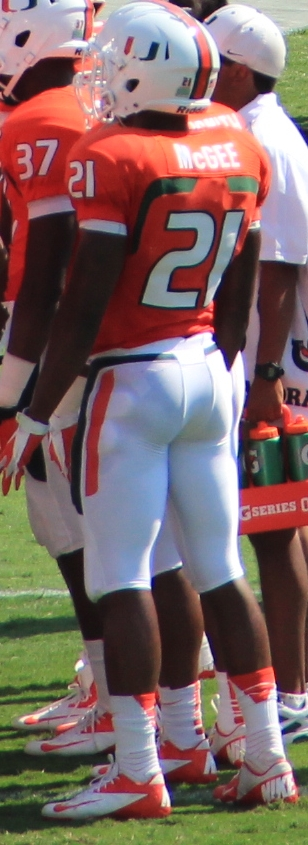
- McGee with the Miami Hurricanes in 2012

No. 32, 33
- Position: Cornerback

Personal information
- Born: December 11, 1990 (age 35); Fort Lauderdale, Florida, U.S.
- Listed height: 5 ft 11 in (1.80 m)
- Listed weight: 193 lb (88 kg)

Career information
- High school: Plantation (FL)
- College: Miami (FL)
- NFL draft: 2013: 5th round, 149th overall pick

Career history
- St. Louis Rams (2013–2015); New York Giants (2015); Dallas Cowboys (2015–2016)*; Detroit Lions (2016)*
- * Offseason or practice squad member only

Career NFL statistics
- Total tackles: 18
- Stats at Pro Football Reference

Brandon McGee (born December 11, 1990) is an American former professional football player who was a cornerback in the National Football League (NFL). He played college football for the Miami Hurricanes and was selected by the St. Louis Rams in the fifth round of the 2013 NFL draft.

== Early life ==
At Plantation High School in Plantation, Florida, McGee finished his senior year with 31 tackles, two interceptions, one sack and one forced fumble and also had 300 receiving yards. As a junior, he played quarterback in seven games, threw for 1,100 passing yards with 13 touchdowns while also rushing for 450 yards. He was named first-team All-Broward County by The Miami Herald.

In track, he placed third in the 100 meters at the 2007 FHSAA 4A District 11 Championships with a time of 10.83 seconds. As a University of Miami collegiate, he joined the track team and recorded a career-best time of 10.73 seconds in the 100 meters at the 2011 Georgia Tech Invitational. He also competed in the 60-meter dash and ran a career-best time of 6.83 seconds in the prelims of the 2011 Rod McCravy Invitational.

== College career ==
McGee attended the University of Miami, and was a member of the Miami Hurricanes football team from 2009 to 2012. He started 25 of 44 games during his career, recording 109 tackles, three interceptions and two sacks. As a senior in 2012, he started all 12 games at defensive back and finished tied for sixth on the team with 54 tackles. He recorded a team-high-tying two interceptions and also notched four tackles-for-loss.

== Professional career ==
Pre-draft measurables
Height	Weight	40-yard dash	10-yard split	20-yard split	20-yard shuttle	Three-cone drill	Vertical jump	Broad jump	Bench press
5 ft 11 in (1.80 m)	193 lb (88 kg)	4.40 s	1.55 s	2.57 s	4.18 s	6.71 s	33 1/2	9 ft 11 in (3.02 m)	14 reps
All values from NFL Combine

=== St. Louis Rams ===
McGee was selected in the fifth round of the 2013 NFL draft as the 149th pick by the St. Louis Rams.

On October 2, 2015, he was cut from the active roster.

=== New York Giants ===
On October 15, 2015, the New York Giants signed McGee to their practice squad. He was promoted to the active roster on October 18, 2015.

On October 31, 2015, the Giants announced they had waived McGee.

=== Dallas Cowboys ===
McGee was signed to the practice squad of the Dallas Cowboys on December 30, 2015. He signed a reserve/future contract with the Cowboys on January 4, 2016. He was waived/injured on June 10, 2016 and reverted to injured reserve. McGee was released on July 13, 2016.

=== Detroit Lions ===
On August 23, 2016, McGee signed with the Detroit Lions. On August 30, 2016, McGee was waived by the Lions.

== Personal life ==
McGee's father was diagnosed with throat cancer in 2000 and his mother with breast cancer in 2002. His mother died of the cancer in 2004.
