= Al Blades =

American football player (1977–2003)

No. 45
- Position: Safety

Personal information
- Born: March 19, 1977
- Died: March 20, 2003 (aged 26); Miami, Florida, U.S.
- Listed height: 6 ft 0 in (1.83 m)
- Listed weight: 207 lb (94 kg)

Career information
- College: Miami (FL)
- NFL draft: 2001: undrafted

Career history
- San Francisco 49ers (2001)

Awards and highlights
- First-team All-Big East (2000); Second-team All-Big East (1999)

Alphonso Blades (March 19, 1977 – March 20, 2003) was an American professional football safety who went to the University of Miami. He was selected as a first-team All-Big East player at Miami. He spent two years with the San Francisco 49ers. In March 2003, he was the passenger of former Plantation High School teammate Martel Johnson who was driving Blades' 1999 Mazda Millenia when it hit another car which they were racing. Both died in the crash.

== Early life and college ==
Blades attended Plantation High School. He accepted a football scholarship from the University of Miami. In 1996, he sat out the season with a medical redshirt. In 1997, he suffered a season-ending knee injury during the first fall practice.

As a sophomore in 1998, he started 7 games and was fourth on the team with 82 tackles. He had a 60-yard interception return for a touchdown against Rutgers University.

As a junior in 1999, he was named the starter at free safety, registering 89 tackles (third on the team). He had 13 tackles against Florida State University. He made 20 tackles against Syracuse University.

As a senior in 2000, he contributed to the team's 11-1 record. He posted 87 tackles (second on the team). He was named the National Defensive Player of the Week for his 16 tackle performance against Virginia Tech. He had 17 tackles in the 2000 Orange Bowl. He finished his career with 258 tackles (125 solos), 2 forced fumbles, 3 interceptions, 10 passes defensed and 4 fumble recoveries.

== Professional career ==
Blades was signed as an undrafted free agent by the San Francisco 49ers after the 2001 NFL draft on April 25. He was waived on September 4. He was signed to the practice squad on September 5. He was promoted to the active roster on September 12. He was released on September 1, 2002.

== Personal life ==
Al Blades was the younger brother of former Seattle Seahawks wide receiver Brian Blades and former Detroit Lions safety Bennie Blades, and uncle of H. B. Blades, who played 4 seasons for the Washington Redskins in the NFL as well. His son, Alphonso Blades II (Al Blades Jr.) is a former defensive back for the Duke Blue Devils, and for the Miami Hurricanes. The younger Blades originally verbally committed to play with the Hurricanes in 2015, then later withdrew his commitment only to later recommit in 2017. He announced his intent to transfer on Dec 1, 2022 after a 5-7 season with first-year coach Mario Cristobal.
