= Plantation High School =

Public high school in Plantation, Florida, United States

Location
- 6901 NW 16th Street; Plantation, Florida 33313; United States; 26.14667°N 80.242051°W

Information
- Type: Public 6–12
- Established: 1963
- School district: Broward County Public Schools
- Superintendent: Peter B. Licata
- Principal: Parinaz Bristol
- Teaching staff: 83.53 (FTE)
- Enrollment: 1,834 (2023–24)
- Student to teacher ratio: 23.48
- Colors: Red, White, and Blue
- Team name: Colonels
- Information: (754) 322-1850
- Website: plantationhigh.browardschools.com

Plantation 6-12 (commonly referred to as PHS) is a public high school located in Plantation, Florida, United States, part of the Broward County Public Schools district. As of 2023, the school served 1,834 students in grades 9 through 12. As of 2026 Plantation 6-12 serves students in grades 6 through 12. It was originally located on the Fort Lauderdale Airport grounds, specifically on the Naval Air Station Fort Lauderdale base. This was used as a temporary location until the new building was ready to open at its present location. Students at Plantation High are called "Colonels." The original school logo was a graphic of a traditional Southern colonel—the equivalent of Colonel Reb, mascot of the University of Mississippi. In the early 1990s, amidst concerns of racial insensitivity, the logo was changed to a large red letter C, similar to the Chicago Bears logo.

Plantation High has an FCAT school grade of "C" since 2014–2023 [2021 not assessed].

The school's attendance zone includes Plantation and a portion of Sunrise.

== Athletics ==
The school's athletic teams are known as the PHS Colonels:

- Baseball
- Basketball
- Cheerleading
- Cross Country
- Flag Football
- Football
- Golf
- Soccer
- Softball
- Swimming & Diving
- Tennis
- Track and Field
- Volleyball
- Water Polo
- Wrestling
- Lacrosse

== Academics ==
In the 2006–2007 school year, Plantation High School was the only school in Broward County to go up a letter grade based on FCAT scores.

Plantation High School has participated in the International Baccalaureate program since April 2010.

== Demographics ==
As of the 2023–24 school year, the total student enrollment was 1,834. The ethnic makeup of the school was 6.5% White, 71.2% Black, 17.7% Hispanic, 1.9% Asian, 2.3% Multiracial, 0.3% Native American or Native Alaskan, and 0.2% Native Hawaiian or Pacific Islander.

== Notable alumni ==
- Melanie Amaro, singer, first season of The X Factor USA winner, Class of 2010
- Neal Avron, record producer/audio engineer and musician, Class of 1983
- Al Blades, former NFL player
- H. B. Blades, former NFL player
- Chris Britton, former MLB player (Baltimore Orioles, New York Yankees), Class of 2001
- Jeremy Cash, former NFL player (Carolina Panthers), Class of 2011
- Steve Curry, former MLB player (Boston Red Sox), Class of 1983
- Jacolby George, college football wide receiver for the Miami Hurricanes, Class of 2021
- Jack Hardy, former MLB player (Chicago White Sox)
- Carl Hiaasen, novelist and columnist, Class of 1970
- Chris Lammons, NFL player, Class of 2014
- Brandon McGee, former NFL player, Class of 2009
- Jeff Owens, former NFL player, Class of 2005
- Charles Partridge, football head coach, Florida Atlantic University, 2014–16
- Josh Robinson, NFL player (Minnesota Vikings), Class of 2009
- Ryan Shazier, NFL player (Pittsburgh Steelers), Class of 2011
- Sojourn Shelton, NFL player (Cincinnati Bengals), Class of 2013
- John Stanier, drummer, Helmet, Class of 1986
- Darrell Strong, former NFL player, Class of 2004
- Mike West, songwriter, rapper, producer, promoter
- Xander Zayas, Professional Boxer
