= Mike West (rapper) =

American musician (born 1978)

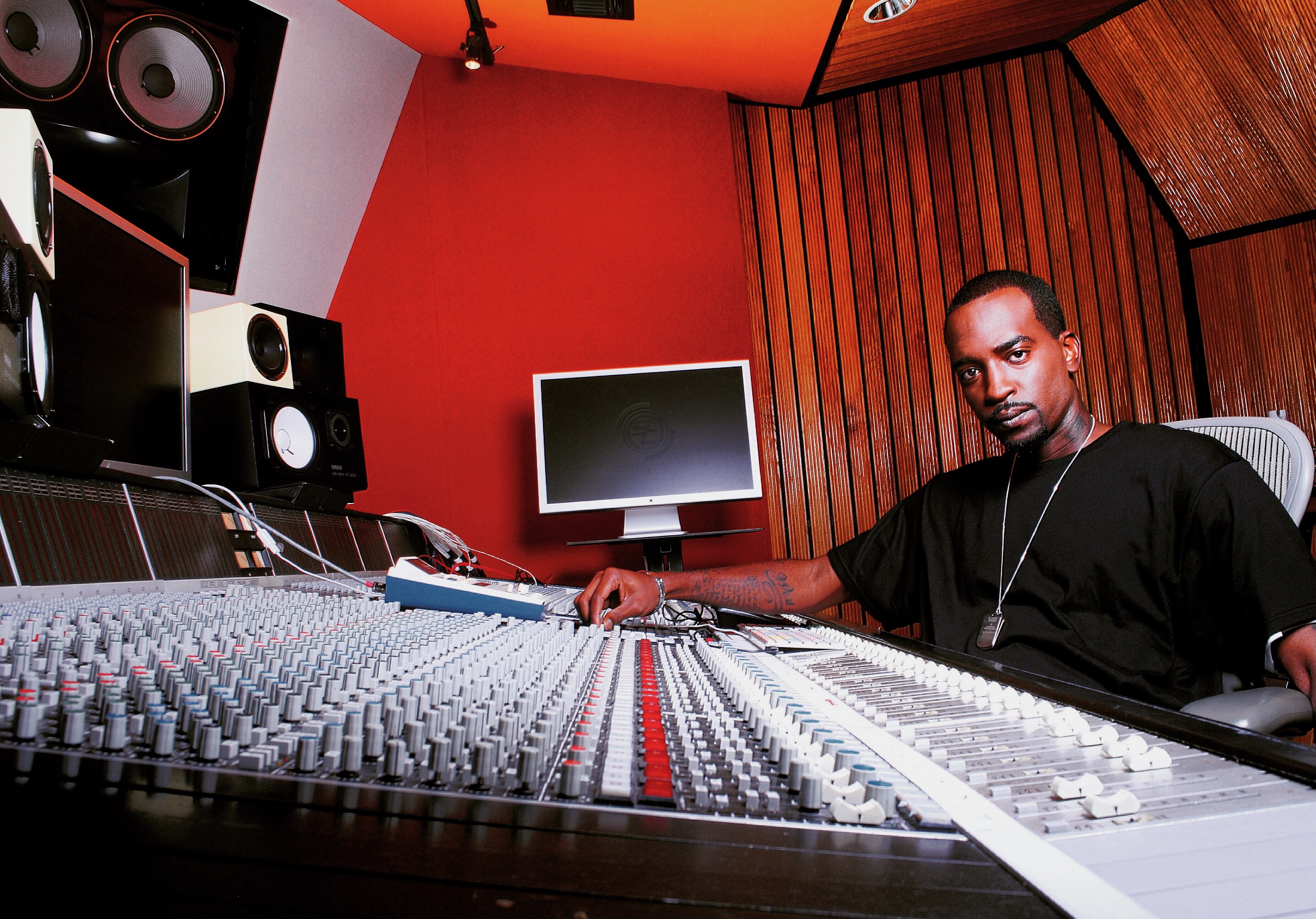
- West at Studio Center, Miami in 2008

Background information
- Also known as: Big Fro
- Born: Michael Quentin West; November 22, 1978 (age 47); Fort Lauderdale, Florida, U.S.
- Genre: Southern hip-hop
- Occupations: Songwriter; recording artist; record executive; producer; promoter
- Years active: 1995–present
- Website: mikewestworldwide.com

Mike West, born Michael Quentin West (born November 22, 1978), is an American songwriter, rapper, producer, promoter and Recording Academy voting member from South Florida. West has been active in the Fort Lauderdale, Broward County and Miami hip-hop scenes since the 1990s. He has collaborated with Uncle Luke, Pitbull, Jason Derulo, 2 Live Crew, Daz Dillinger, Mopreme Shakur, Amil, members of Thug Life and Outlawz, and numerous producers; is the founder of two independent record labels, HangTime Entertainment and Big Fro Music Group; and has released more than a dozen albums, mixtapes and singles, and appeared on hip-hop compilations and soundtracks.

== Musical style ==
West fuses Southern hip-hop rhythms with West Coast production sensibilities, shaped by his upbringing in South Florida and time in Los Angeles. His lyrics focus on resilience, street life, and the evolution of independent hip-hop.

== Early life and background ==
West was born Michael Quentin West on November 22, 1978 in Fort Lauderdale, FL. He was raised in Broward County and South Miami, Florida, and spent summers as a teenager living with relatives in Los Angeles. His father, Ernest West, was a jazz musician, and his mother, Dorothy J. West, was a homemaker. His grandmother, Lillie M. Jackson, gave him his first radio when he was twelve-years-old and encouraged him musically. He is a graduate of Plantation High School.

== Career ==
=== 1990s and 2000s: Luke Records and Thug Life ===
In 1995, West was invited to meet rapper Eazy-E in Los Angeles after a demo West recorded with producer Rod XL reached Eazy’s Ruthless Records label. Although no record deal materialized, West's early immersion in West Coast hip-hop culture helped him make connections with members of Thug Life and Outlawz, rap groups co-founded by Tupac Shakur, that would influence West's sound and lead to future collaborations. He returned to South Florida to finish high school and continue pursuing music.

Back home, West began writing and recording with audio engineer Eddie Miller, and he performed around Fort Lauderdale in the late 1990s. West founded HangTime Entertainment during this period as an outlet for himself and other South Florida artists. His first single, "Sunshine State," caught the attention of Billboard magazine in 1999 with "clever wordplay and a delivery that's, by turns, chilled and aggressive."

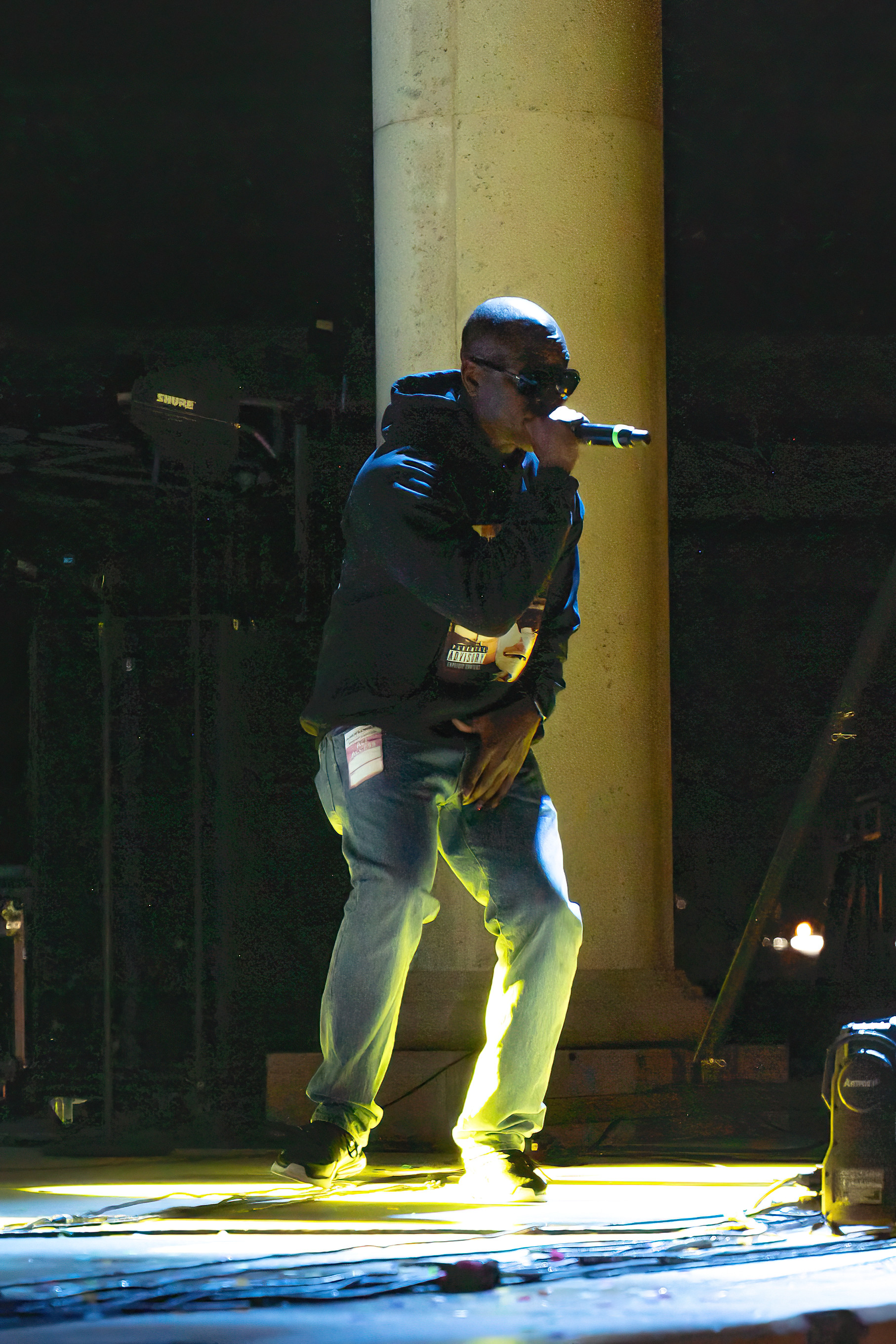
West performing with Digital Underground at MIDFLORIDA Event Center, Port St. Lucie, November 2024

At the same time, West was working for Luke Records, the label founded by 2 Live Crew frontman Luther “Uncle Luke” Campbell. The two met through a cousin of West's, Chico, a member of the Miami-based Ghetto Style DJs crew who were partners with Campbell in Pac Jam Teen Disco, a no-alcohol club for teens Campbell opened in Miami's Liberty City neighborhood.

Campbell hired West to handle front desk duties at the record label, and in 1996 West moved up to radio and promotions. He oversaw the campaign for Campbell's 1997 solo album, Changin' the Game, which included the RIAA gold-certified single, Raise the Roof, a Billboard Hot Rap Singles No. 1 track that also reached No. 26 on Billboard's Hot 100 chart. He traveled with Campbell on tour to help tape two of Campbell's Luke’s Freakshow spring-break party videos in Cancun, Mexico and Daytona Beach, Florida. In 2001, West was named head of Luke Records' artists & repertoire division.

West released his first full-length album, They Never Knew, that summer on his HangTime label. His hometown newspaper, the Sun-Sentinel, praised the LP as "a set of funky tracks and battling raps with cameos that also display the man’s talent for networking." Guest artists included Uncle Luke, Daz Dillinger of the Death Row Records L.A. duo Tha Dogg Pound, DJ Red Alert, and Mopreme, stepbrother of Tupac. At Mopreme's invitation, West became a member of the extended Thug Life family.

West left Luke Records in 2002 to focus on his own music, drawing on both his Miami and Los Angeles connections. His 2002 track, "Grand Finale," featured Miami rapper Pitbull, with production by Writers Block. His 2003 single, “Don’t Know Me,” featured Dillinger and Jamaican rapper Honorebel, and was produced by Trackjunkiez. It landed on the 2003 soundtrack for Voodoo Tailz, an independent horror film directed by Daniel Zirilli, alongside other tracks that featured Kool Keith, Redman and MC Eiht.

In October 2003, the hip-hop magazines The Source and XXL both spotlighted West, The Source in its monthly "Off The Radar" feature on regional artists generating national buzz and XXL in its "Show & Prove" feature on emerging artists. A profile that year in Miami New Times described West as "an anomaly in the South Florida rap game" who "spent most of his adult life bouncing between here and Los Angeles ... "

A 2003 article in New Times Broward-Palm Beach noted the buzz around West and described his music: "Interjecting a small dose of West Coast laissez faire into more typical thug trappings, West’s output — a 2001 album, They Never Knew, and an appearance on the following year’s Thug Lifestyles compilation — reeks of the hard grind of the Dirty South."

In 2005-2007, West released a trio of mixtapes: The Statement (2005) with DJ Hollywood and Teddy T; Divide & Conquer (2006) with DJ Hollywood and DJ King Assassin; and Divide & Conquer II with DJ Thug Life (2007). Divide & Conquer included the T Rich-produced song "I Got History," featuring Chair Krazy and Shakur's cousin, Outlawz member Kastro, while The Statement featured Outlawz members EDIDON and Young Noble on "Come With Me," produced by Casa de Negro. Other West releases from this period include the single "Keep It Going" featuring Derulo with production by Bread & Water, and "I Gotta Get It," featuring Amil, produced by Ace and Gamboa of G Music.

=== 2010s and 2020s: Big Fro, Whisky a Go Go and a Thug Life reunion ===
West's 2011 single, “Where I Stand,” produced by Superstar O, aired out business-related disagreements with Miami’s DJ Khaled and with Miami-based Slip-n-Slide Records. West also stepped away from the music industry that year to focus on his health, wellbeing and fitness. He continues to work as a physical trainer.

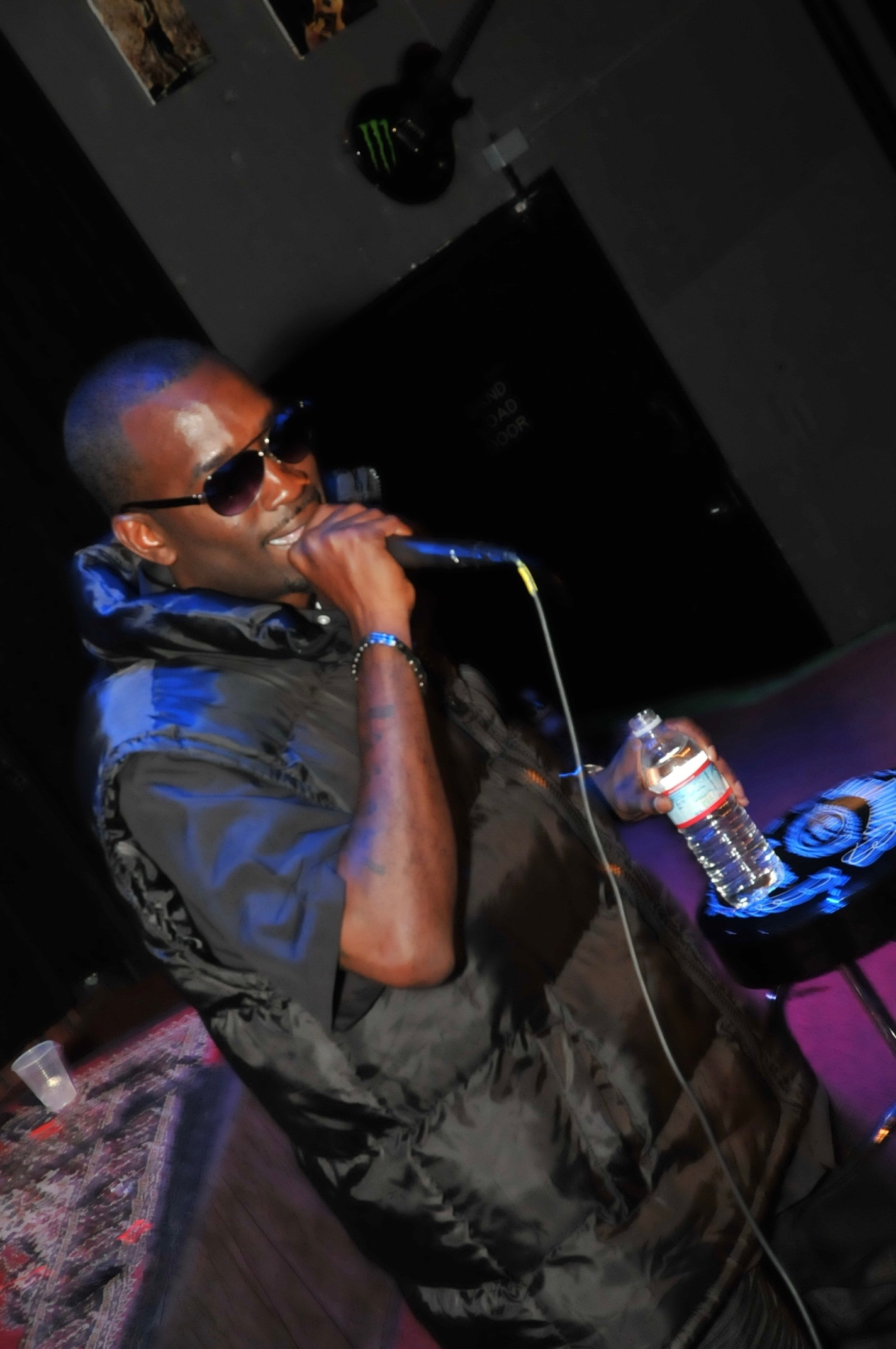
West at the Whisky a Go Go in Hollywood, CA in 2012

He returned to music-making in 2012 with “Till The Morning Rise,” a single featuring West's Broward County neighbor, Urban Mystic, produced by STEM. The track garnered play on outlets including Cox Media Group’s South Florida station 99JAMZ WEDR, the Stevie Wonder-owned Taxi Productions station KJLH in Compton, CA, and public radio station WRFG in Atlanta. That year West also released the third mixtape in his Divide & Conquer series, with DJ Young Cee.

In 2012, West played a headlining set at the Whisky a Go Go in Hollywood, CA, making him the rare Broward County hip-hop artist to perform at the historic Sunset Strip venue. That year West also founded a second independent label, Big Fro Music Group, after the nickname "Fro," given to him as a teen-ager by Father MC, who was briefly signed to Luke Records. West released the single "Me & My Louie Bag" on Big Fro in 2014, produced by Jibba Jawz, and the Ri$e 2 Power mixtape with DJ Cheeks. He was affiliated with Cash Money Records founders Birdman and Ronald "Slim" Williams and the label's Rich Gang rap crew around this time before taking an extended break from music.

West returned in 2022 with the single, "Medusa Head." In 2024 he released a six-track EP, The Journey, with production by Jibba Jawz and TrackPros. The Journey included "Medusa Head" as well as "Let Me Live," featuring Urban Mystic, "Got Away From You," featuring Kory Burns, and "Get Your Money."

Macadoshis, Mike West, and Mopreme at EastWest Studios in Hollywood, CA in 2025

West released a new single, “Still Thug Lawz,” on October 16, 2026 through his Big Fro label, featuring Thug Life members Macadoshis and Mopreme. The trio pays tribute to fallen comrades and the legacy of 2Pac, and trades verses about navigating hip-hop life while staying true to a code of “self-determination and defense,” as West raps. Produced by Trick Daddy and DJ Kahled collaborator Gold Ru$h, the uptempo, bass-forward track features a clipped piano sample, accented by tolling bells in the style of “Hail Mary” by Shakur’s 2Pac alter ego Makaveli. It opens with archival audio of late Thug Life member Big Syke talking about the group’s “no boundaries” belief in putting undsicovered rap talent wherever they found it on their recordings.

“Still Thug Lawz” feat. Thug Life was mixed by Pitbull collaborator Al Burna and Abbey Road Studios engineer Alex Gordon. West, on his Instagram and X accounts, has posted that the single is from a forthcoming album, Famous Timez. The song debuted on streaming services three days after Duane “Keffe D” Davis was sentenced to 40 years to life in prison for the murder of Tupac Shakur.
