= Khaseem Greene =

American football player (born 1989)

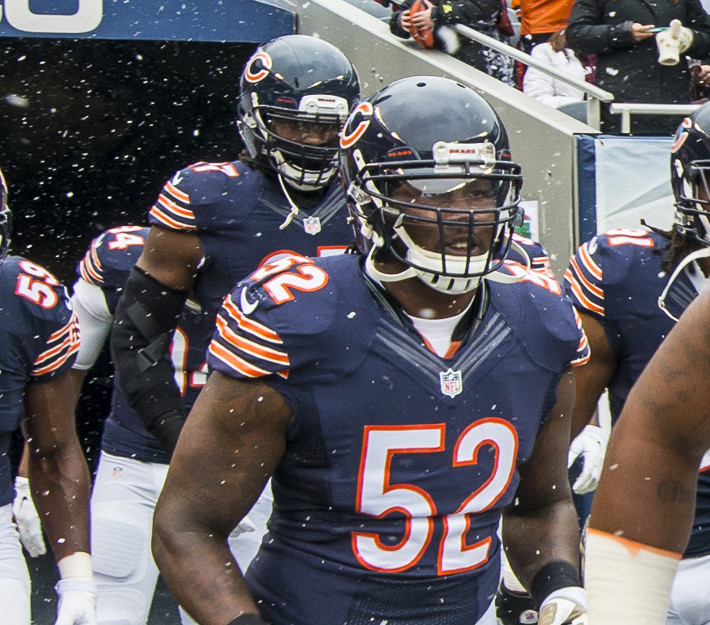
- Greene with the Chicago Bears in 2014

No. 59, 52
- Position: Linebacker

Personal information
- Born: February 4, 1989 (age 37); Elizabeth, New Jersey, U.S.
- Listed height: 6 ft 1 in (1.85 m)
- Listed weight: 241 lb (109 kg)

Career information
- High school: Elizabeth
- College: Rutgers
- NFL draft: 2013: 4th round, 117th overall pick

Career history
- Chicago Bears (2013–2014); Tampa Bay Buccaneers (2015)*; Detroit Lions (2015–2016)*; Kansas City Chiefs (2017)*; Massachusetts Pirates (2019–2020)
- * Offseason or practice squad member only

Awards and highlights
- First-team All-American (2012); 2× Big East Defensive Player of the Year (2011, 2012); 2× First-team All-Big East (2011, 2012)

Career NFL statistics
- Total tackles: 45
- Forced fumbles: 1
- Interceptions: 1
- Stats at Pro Football Reference

Khaseem Greene (born February 4, 1989) is an American former professional football player who was a linebacker in the National Football League (NFL). He played college football for the Rutgers Scarlet Knights and was selected by the Chicago Bears in the fourth round of the 2013 NFL draft.

== Early life ==
Greene was born in Elizabeth, New Jersey. He attended Elizabeth High School, where he played high school football for the Elizabeth Minutemen. He also had a postgraduate year at Avon Old Farms school in Avon Connecticut where he was a standout in basketball, football and track. During his time at Avon Old Farms he was part of the school's first ever New England track championship along with former New York Giants running back Michael Cox.

== College career ==
While attending Rutgers University, Greene played for the Rutgers Scarlet Knights football team from 2008 to 2012. As a junior in 2011, he switched from safety to weakside linebacker. He led the Big East Conference with 141 tackles, 3.5 sacks and two forced fumbles. As a senior in 2012, Greene recorded 136 tackles and six sacks with two interceptions, six forced fumbles and two touchdowns via fumble recoveries, and was named the Big East Defensive Player of the Year and a first-team All-American by ESPN.

== Professional career ==
Pre-draft measurables
Height	Weight	Arm length	Hand span	40-yard dash	10-yard split	20-yard split	20-yard shuttle	Three-cone drill	Vertical jump	Broad jump	Bench press
6 ft 0 3/4 in (1.85 m)	241 lb (109 kg)	32 5/8 in (0.83 m)	9 5/8 in (0.24 m)	4.70 s	1.64 s	2.77 s	4.20 s	7.58 s	34.5 in (0.88 m)	9 ft 8 in (2.95 m)	17 reps
All values from NFL Scouting Combine/Pro Day

=== Chicago Bears ===
Greene was selected in the fourth round (117th pick overall) by the Chicago Bears, the second linebacker taken by the team. He signed a four-year contract with the Bears on May 2, 2013. Greene signed a four-year, $2.592 million contract. The deal included a $432,092 signing bonus.

Greene made his NFL debut in week nine against the Green Bay Packers in place of the injured Lance Briggs, recording four tackles. Greene concluded 2013 with 38.5 tackles, an interception, and a forced fumble. In March 2014, Greene tweeted that he will change his number from #59 to #52, in honor of Rutgers teammate Eric LeGrand. On May 11, 2015, he was waived by the Bears.

=== Tampa Bay Buccaneers ===
Greene was claimed off waivers by the Tampa Bay Buccaneers on May 12, 2015. He was released by the Buccaneers on September 4, 2015.

=== Detroit Lions ===
On November 18, 2015, Greene was signed to the Lions' practice squad. On January 4, 2016, Greene signed a futures contract with the Detroit Lions. On September 3, 2016, he was waived by the Lions.

=== Kansas City Chiefs ===
On January 21, 2017, Greene signed a futures contract with the Chiefs. On May 9, 2017, he was waived by the Chiefs.

=== Massachusetts Pirates ===
He was signed by the Massachusetts Pirates on November 9, 2019.

== Personal life ==
Greene's half-brother, Ray Graham, is a running back who played college football for the Pittsburgh Panthers and who has played in the NFL. Their father is Raymond Graham. Greene has a daughter.
