= Brian Blades =

American football player (born 1965)

No. 89
- Position: Wide receiver

Personal information
- Born: July 24, 1965 (age 61); Fort Lauderdale, Florida, U.S.
- Listed height: 5 ft 11 in (1.80 m)
- Listed weight: 189 lb (86 kg)

Career information
- High school: Piper (Sunrise, Florida)
- College: Miami (FL)
- NFL draft: 1988: 2nd round, 49th overall pick

Career history
- Seattle Seahawks (1988–1998)

Awards and highlights
- Second-team All-Pro (1989); Pro Bowl (1989); PFWA All-Rookie Team (1988); Seattle Seahawks 35th Anniversary team; Seattle Seahawks Top 50 players; 2× National champion (1983, 1987); Second Team All-South Independent (1987)

Career NFL statistics
- Receptions: 581
- Receiving yards: 7,620
- Receiving touchdowns: 34
- Stats at Pro Football Reference

Brian Keith Blades (born July 24, 1965) is an American former professional football player who was a wide receiver for the Seattle Seahawks of the National Football League (NFL).

== Early life ==
Blades graduated from Piper High School in Sunrise, Florida in 1983. He attended the University of Miami.

== College career ==
He finished his college career with 80 catches for 1,493 yards and 15 touchdowns.

== Professional career ==
Pre-draft measurables
Height	Weight	Hand span	40-yard dash	10-yard split	20-yard split	Bench press
5 ft 11 1/8 in (1.81 m)	182 lb (83 kg)	9 1/4 in (0.23 m)	4.48 s	1.59 s	2.61 s	13 reps
All values from NFL Combine

After graduating, he was chosen in the second round (49th overall) of the 1988 NFL draft by the Seattle Seahawks. Blades spent his entire 11-year career with the Seahawks, playing for the team from 1988-1998. He signed a one-year contract with the Seahawks prior to the 1999 season, but was cut on June 5, 1999. In 1989 Blades won the Marcus Nalley MVP award. Also that year (1989) he was voted into the pro bowl after having 1,063 receiving yards and five touchdowns.

== NFL career statistics ==
Legend
**Bold**	Career high

=== Regular season ===
Year	Team	Games		Receiving				
Year	Team	GP	GS	Rec	Yds	Avg	Lng	TD
1988	SEA	16	7	40	682	**17.1**	55	**8**
1989	SEA	16	14	77	1,063	13.8	60	5
1990	SEA	16	16	49	525	10.7	24	3
1991	SEA	16	16	70	1,003	14.3	52	2
1992	SEA	6	5	19	256	13.5	37	1
1993	SEA	16	14	80	945	11.8	41	3
1994	SEA	16	16	**81**	**1,086**	13.4	45	4
1995	SEA	16	16	77	1,001	13.0	49	4
1996	SEA	11	9	43	556	12.9	**80**	2
1997	SEA	11	3	30	319	10.6	27	2
1998	SEA	16	6	15	184	12.3	47	0
Career		156	122	581	7,620	13.1	80	34

== Manslaughter conviction and acquittal ==
Blades was charged with murder in the second degree for the death of his cousin, Charles Blades Jr. Blades initially pleaded "no contest" but later changed his plea to "not guilty" before the trial. Blades claimed the pistol accidentally discharged a round into his cousin during a struggle. During the trial, the prosecuting attorney and a gun expert staged a mock struggle with a blank filled gun, in which the gun accidentally discharged.

After a jury convicted Blades of manslaughter, the presiding Judge Susan Lebow overturned the verdict 72 hours later, citing the prosecution's failure to provide enough evidence for conviction. The case was appealed to the Fourth District Court of Appeal, and the court upheld his acquittal.

== Personal life ==
He is the older brother of former NFL cornerbacks Bennie Blades and Al Blades. He is also the uncle of former Washington Redskins linebacker H. B. Blades. Blades and his wife Tisha, daughters Brittany and Brianne, and son Brian II live in Ft. Lauderdale, Florida.
