= George Selvie =

American football player (born 1987)

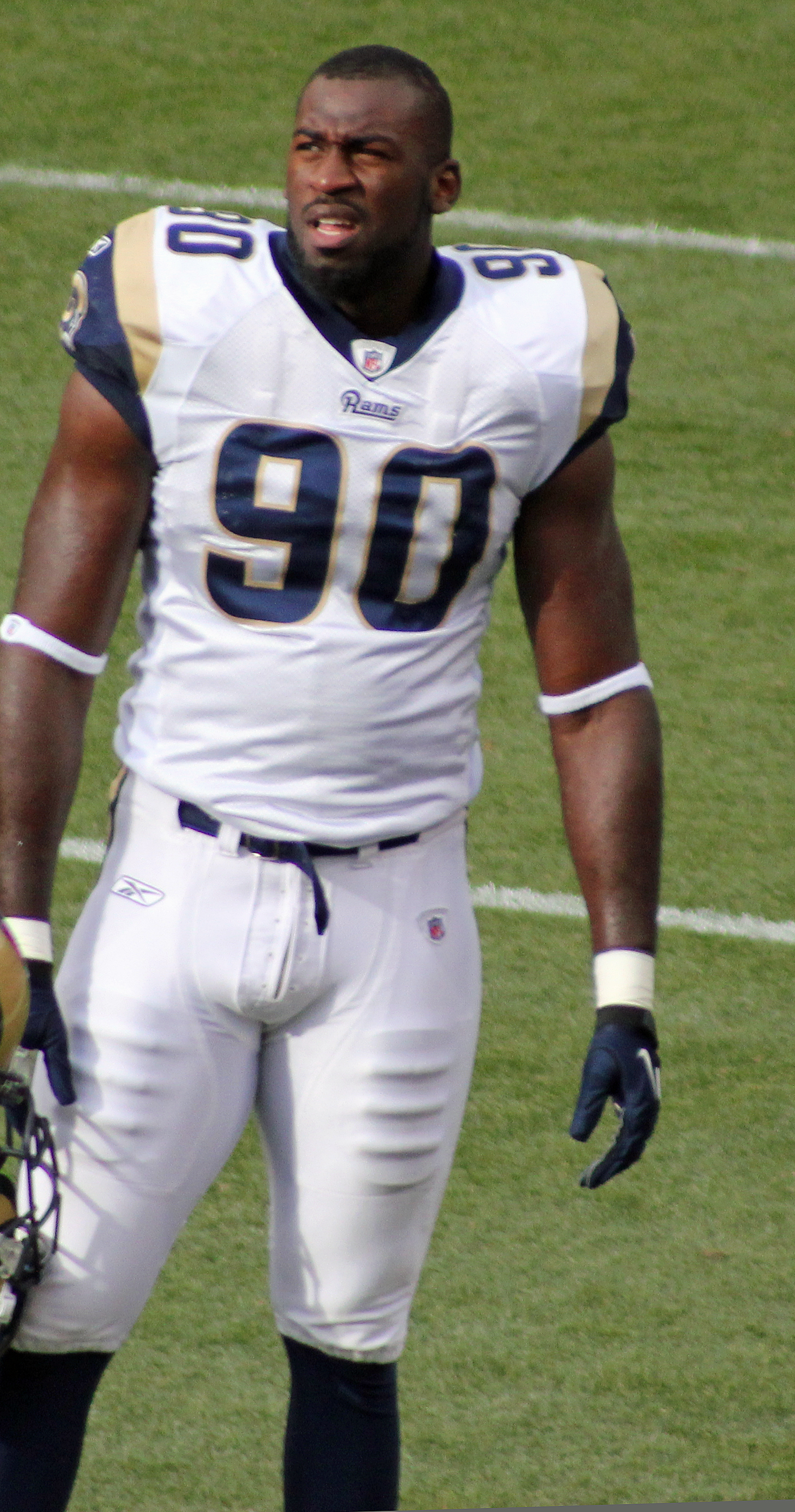
- Selvie with the St. Louis Rams in 2010

No. 90, 91, 99, 93
- Position: Defensive end

Personal information
- Born: March 6, 1987 (age 39); Pensacola, Florida, U.S.
- Listed height: 6 ft 4 in (1.93 m)
- Listed weight: 247 lb (112 kg)

Career information
- High school: Pine Forest (Pensacola)
- College: South Florida
- NFL draft: 2010: 7th round, 226th overall pick

Career history
- St. Louis Rams (2010); Carolina Panthers (2011); Jacksonville Jaguars (2011–2012); Tampa Bay Buccaneers (2013)*; Dallas Cowboys (2013–2014); New York Giants (2015)
- * Offseason or practice squad member only

Awards and highlights
- Bill Willis Trophy (2007); Consensus All-American (2007); First-team All-American (2008); Big East Defensive Player of the Year (2007); 2× First-team All-Big East (2007, 2008); Second-team All-Big East (2009)

Career NFL statistics
- Total tackles: 143
- Sacks: 14
- Forced fumbles: 2
- Fumble recoveries: 4
- Stats at Pro Football Reference

George Selvie (born March 6, 1987) is an American former professional football player who was a defensive end in the National Football League (NFL) for the St. Louis Rams, Carolina Panthers, Jacksonville Jaguars, Dallas Cowboys and New York Giants. He played college football for the South Florida Bulls, earning consensus All-American honors in 2007. He was selected by the St. Louis Rams in the seventh round of the 2010 NFL draft.

== Early life ==
Selvie moved several times during his childhood, while following father's military career. He attended Pine Forest High School in Pensacola, Florida, where he was a two-way player at center and defensive tackle. As a senior, he totaled 55 tackles and 6 sacks.

He received second-team Class 3A and Emerald Coast All-star honors. He was considered only a two-star recruit by Rivals.com and was not ranked nationally. He also competed in weightlifting.

== College career ==
Selvie accepted a football scholarship from the University of South Florida, where he was originally recruited to play center. As a redshirt freshman in 2006, he was moved to the defensive end position. He started all 13 games at right defensive end, tallying 83 tackles (third on the team), 5.5 sacks, 14.5 tackles for loss, 9 quarterback hurries, one pass defensed, 4 forced fumbles and 2 fumble recoveries. He had 8 tackles (3.5 for loss), a 9-yard fumble recovery for a touchdown and one forced fumble against West Virginia University, earning National Defensive Player of the Week honors. He made 10 tackles against the University of Cincinnati. For his efforts, Sporting News named him to its Freshman All-America team.

As a sophomore in 2007, he had a breakout season and was selected as a consensus All-American and the Big East Defensive Player of the Year. He started all 13 games and contributed to the Bulls ranking No. 2 nationally, while collecting 59 tackles (46 solo), 14.5 sacks (second in the NCAA), 31.5 tackles for loss (led the NCAA and second in college history), 13 quarterback hurries, 3 forced fumbles and one blocked kick. He had 4 sacks (tied school record) and 6 tackles for loss (school record) in the season opener against Elon University. He made 5 tackles for loss and 3 sacks against the University of North Carolina. He had 8 tackles (2 for loss) and one sack against West Virginia University. He made 4 tackles for loss against the University of Cincinnati. He played in the 2007 Sun Bowl.

As a junior in 2008, he appeared in 12 games with 11 starts, missing the majority of 3 games with an ankle injury. He recorded 43 tackles (30 solo) with 13.5 of them for loss, 5.5 sacks, 3 quarterback hurries, 5 passes defensed, one forced fumble and 2 fumble recoveries. He had 4 tackles for loss and 2 sacks against the University of Louisville. He became the first two-time, first-team All-American in school history, when he was selected by the American Football Coaches Association (also Walter Camp Foundation second-team All-American).

As a senior in 2009, he started all 13 games, registering 42 tackles (second on the team), 9.5 tackles for loss (second on the team), 3.5 sacks (third on the team), 7 quarterback hurries, 2 passes defensed, one forced fumble and one fumble recovery. He had one sack, 2 tackles for loss, 3 quarterback hurries and one fumble recovery in a 17-7 win against Florida State University. He received first-team All-Big East honors by Phil Steele.

Selvie appeared in 51 games, leaving with the school single-season and career record for starts (50 games), sacks (29), tackles for loss (69.5), forced fumbles (9), sacks in a single-season (14.5) and tackles for loss in a single-season (31.5). He ranked second in NCAA history and set the Big East Conference record with 69.5 career tackles for loss. While Selvie was a student, he was initiated as a member of Phi Beta Sigma fraternity.

In 2019, he was inducted into the University of South Florida Athletic Hall of Fame.

== Professional career ==
=== Pre-draft ===
Pre-draft measurables
Height	Weight	Arm length	Hand span	40-yard dash	10-yard split	20-yard split	20-yard shuttle	Three-cone drill	Vertical jump	Broad jump	Bench press	Wonderlic
6 ft 4 3/8 in (1.94 m)	250 lb (113 kg)	34 1/2 in (0.88 m)	9 3/8 in (0.24 m)	4.93 s	1.67 s	2.78 s	4.63 s	7.48 s	30 1/2 in (0.77 m)	9 ft 1 in (2.77 m)	24 reps	x
All values from NFL Combine

Selvie had "been labeled as a first-round talent with sixth- or seventh-round production". After his consensus All-America year in 2007, his production "tailed off considerably" in 2008 and 2009.

=== St. Louis Rams ===
Selvie was selected by the St. Louis Rams in the seventh round (226th overall) of the 2010 NFL draft. As a rookie, he played in all 16 games as a backup defensive end, finishing with 21 tackles, 1.5 sacks and one special teams tackle. He was waived on September 3, 2011.

=== Carolina Panthers ===
On September 4, 2011, he was claimed off waivers by the Carolina Panthers. He was waived on October 5, after playing four games and recording two tackles.

=== Jacksonville Jaguars ===
On November 15, 2011, he was signed by the Jacksonville Jaguars. He played in the last 7 games, posting 4 tackles, one-half sack, 2 special teams tackles and one fumble recovery.

In 2012, he appeared in 9 games as a backup, making 30 tackles (2 for loss), one sack and 7 quarterback pressures. He missed 4 games with a knee injury and 2 contests with a concussion. He wasn't re-signed after the season.

=== Tampa Bay Buccaneers ===
On April 2, 2013, he signed as a free agent with the Tampa Bay Buccaneers . He was released on May 6.

=== Dallas Cowboys ===
On July 24, 2013, Selvie signed with the Dallas Cowboys for depth purposes, after Anthony Spencer was having problems with his left knee and backup Tyrone Crawford was lost for the year with an Achilles injury. Although he was not expected to make the team, he earned first-team practice reps in his first two weeks and was named the starter at strong defensive end for the Hall of Fame Game against the Miami Dolphins, where he had a notable performance with 2 sacks in a 24-20 win.

He would keep surpassing expectations and on September 8, made his first NFL start. During the season, he had several noteworthy performances, earning the nickname "Bricklayer" from defensive line coach Rod Marinelli. He started all 16 games and was a key player on a defensive line that fought through many injuries. He finished the year with 39 tackles, 7 sacks (second on the team), 7 tackles for loss, 22 quarterback pressures, 2 pass deflections, one forced fumble and one fumble recovery.

In 2014, his numbers were down from his breakout season, starting 13 games at left defensive end, while recording 31 tackles, 20 quarterback pressures, 3 sacks, one forced fumble and one fumble recovery. He wasn't re-signed after the season.

=== New York Giants ===
On March 20, 2015, he signed a one-year contract with the New York Giants, to provide depth after the release of defensive end Mathias Kiwanuka. Although he was expected to be a reserve player and a situational pass rusher, injuries on the defensive line opened the door for him to start 3 contests, before his own injuries forced him to miss 4 games. He finished with 15 tackles, one sack and one fumble recovery. He wasn't re-signed after the season.

== Career statistics ==
=== NFL ===
Legend
**Bold**	Career high

==== Regular season ====
Year	Team	Games		Tackles					Interceptions					Fumbles			
Year	Team	GP	GS	Cmb	Solo	Ast	Sck	TFL	Int	Yds	TD	Lng	PD	FF	FR	Yds	TD
2010	STL	**16**	0	21	15	6	1.5	5	0	0	0	0	0	0	0	0	0
2011	CAR	4	0	2	2	0	0.0	0	0	0	0	0	0	0	0	0	0
2011	JAX	7	0	4	3	1	0.5	1	0	0	0	0	0	0	**1**	0	0
2012	JAX	9	0	15	10	5	1.0	2	0	0	0	0	0	0	0	0	0
2013	DAL	**16**	**16**	**45**	**37**	8	**7.0**	**13**	0	0	0	0	**1**	**1**	**1**	0	0
2014	DAL	**16**	13	30	19	**11**	3.0	3	0	0	0	0	**1**	**1**	**1**	**2**	0
2015	NYG	12	3	26	15	**11**	1.0	1	0	0	0	0	0	0	**1**	0	0
		80	32	143	101	42	14.0	25	0	0	0	0	2	2	4	2	0

==== Playoffs ====
Year	Team	Games		Tackles					Interceptions					Fumbles			
Year	Team	GP	GS	Cmb	Solo	Ast	Sck	TFL	Int	Yds	TD	Lng	PD	FF	FR	Yds	TD
2014	DAL	**2**	**2**	**6**	**4**	**2**	0.0	0	0	0	0	0	0	0	0	0	0
		2	2	6	4	2	0.0	0	0	0	0	0	0	0	0	0	0

=== College ===
Year	Team	GP	GS	TT	Solo	Ast	TFL	Sack	PD	INT	FF	FR	Hurr	TD
2006	USF	13	13	83	55	28	15	5.5	1	0	4	2	9	0
2007	USF	13	13	59	46	13	31.5	14.5	0	0	3	0	13	0
2008	USF	12	11	43	30	13	13.5	5.5	5	0	1	2	3	0
2009	USF	13	13	42	19	23	9.5	3.5	2	0	1	1	7	0
	**Career**	**51**	**50**	**227**	**150**	**77**	**69.5**	**29**	**8**	**0**	**9**	**5**	**32**	**0**

== Career highlights ==
College

- First-team All-American (2008)
- Consensus first-team All-American (2007)
- Big East Defensive Player of the Year (2007)
- 2× First-team All-Big East (2007, 2008)
- Second-team All-Big East (2009)
- Bronko Nagurski Trophy finalist (2007)
- Ted Hendricks Award finalist (2007)
- Bill Willis Trophy (2007)
- Freshman All-American by Sporting News (2006)
- University of South Florida Athletic Hall of Fame (2019)
