= Trevor Canfield =

American football player (born 1986)

No. 69
- Position: Offensive guard

Personal information
- Born: January 10, 1986 (age 40); Cincinnati, Ohio, U.S.
- Listed height: 6 ft 5 in (1.96 m)
- Listed weight: 307 lb (139 kg)

Career information
- College: Cincinnati
- NFL draft: 2009: 7th round, 254th overall pick

Career history
- Arizona Cardinals (2009)*; Seattle Seahawks (2009); Detroit Lions (2010); New York Jets (2011–2012)*
- * Offseason or practice squad member only

Awards and highlights
- Second-team All-American (2008); 2× Second-team All-Big East (2006–2007)
- Stats at Pro Football Reference

Trevor Canfield (born January 10, 1986) is an American former professional football player who was a guard in the National Football League (NFL). He played college football for the Cincinnati Bearcats and was selected by the Arizona Cardinals in the seventh round of the 2009 NFL draft. Canfield was also a member of the Seattle Seahawks, Detroit Lions, and New York Jets.

== Professional career ==
=== Arizona Cardinals ===
Canfield was one of the last picks of the 2009 NFL draft, selected in the seventh round 254th overall by the Arizona Cardinals. He stayed with the Cardinals past the final round of roster cuts and into the regular season as a member of the practice squad before the Seahawks signed him to their active roster.

=== New York Jets ===
On August 5, 2011, Canfield signed with the New York Jets. He was waived on September 2. Canfield was re-signed to the team's practice squad on September 4. Canfield was released from the practice squad on September 19.

Canfield was signed by the Jets to a reserve/future contract on January 21, 2012. He was waived on May 3.
