= Ryan Stanchek =

American football player and coach (born 1986)

UTEP Miners
- Title: Co-offensive coordinator & offensive line coach

Personal information
- Born: June 26, 1986 (age 40); Cincinnati, Ohio, U.S.
- Listed height: 6 ft 3 in (1.91 m)
- Listed weight: 305 lb (138 kg)

Career information
- College: West Virginia
- NFL draft: 2009: undrafted

Career history

Playing
- Atlanta Falcons (2009)*; Cleveland Gladiators (2010)
- * Offseason or practice squad member only

Coaching
- Florida State (2011) Offensive quality control; Indiana (2012–2013) Graduate assistant; Alcorn State (2014–2016) Offensive line coach; Alcorn State (2017) Run game coordinator & offensive line coach; Alcorn State (2018) Offensive coordinator & offensive line coach; Southern Miss (2019–2020) Offensive line coach; Florida A&M (2021) Co-offensive coordinator & offensive line coach; Austin Peay (2022) Co-offensive coordinator & offensive line coach; Tulsa (2023) Offensive line coach; UTEP (2024–present) Co-offensive coordinator & offensive line coach

Awards and highlights
- First-team All-American (2007); Second-team All-American (2008)

Ryan Stanchek (born June 26, 1986) is an American college football coach and former professional guard. He is the co-offensive coordinator and offensive line coach for the University of Texas at El Paso, positions he has held since 2024. He was signed by the Atlanta Falcons as an undrafted free agent in 2009. He played college football at West Virginia.

== Early life ==
Stanchek, the son of John and Debra Stanchek, was a first team all-state, all-GCL, and all-southwest football player at LaSalle High. Along with being the team captain, Stanchek was the conference and Anthony Muñoz Foundation Lineman of the Year. He was also selected as the Big 33 Football Classic as a senior. As a junior, he was an all-league selection and won his team's Iron Man award. He was also a basketball and discus letterman.

== Collegiate career ==
=== Freshman season ===
Stanchek arrived at West Virginia in 2004, but did not see varsity action and was redshirted by head coach Rich Rodriguez. Although not seeing action, he won the Danny Van Etten Award from his coaches as the scout team player of the year.

Stanchek finally saw action in 2005, and earned the starting role four games into the season as an offensive guard. His first start of the season was at the left guard position against Virginia Tech, where he accumulated nine knockdowns. Against Cincinnati, he had eight knockdowns. In the overtime-thriller against Louisville, Stanchek had a reception for five yards along with his nine knockdowns. Stanchek finished the season by being named to the first team freshman All-American team, along with quarterback Patrick White and running back Steve Slaton.

=== Sophomore season ===
In 2006, as a sophomore, Stanchek headed the offensive line at tackle that blocked for two Heisman candidates, White at quarterback and Slaton at running back. Along with Stanchek on the offensive line there was Dan Mozes, the consensus All-American center who won the Rimington Trophy for the nation's best center. Stanchek and the offensive line helped the West Virginia team rise to the nation's second best rushing totals and an 11–2 record.

=== Junior season ===
As a junior, in 2007, Stanchek returned as the most experienced member of the West Virginia offensive line that lost Mozes at center. The offensive line also lost Rick Trickett to Florida State. Stanchek started every game on the season at tackle, but was also backup guard. Stanchek led the offensive line that guided the Mountaineers to 38.9 points per game and 450.5 yards per game. Stanchek was passed up on the all-Big East teams however, but was named a 2007 Walter Camp second-team All-American, Associated Press All-American third-teamer, was named to four other All-American teams, and was awarded the team's John Russell Memorial Award by the coaching staff. Pat White and Steve Slaton both rushed for 1,000 yards for the consecutive season behind Stanchek's 95 knockdown blocks. The offensive line only gave up 13 sacks as a unit and Stanchek was in the top ten nationally in sacks allowed. In the offensive line's finest game, the 2008 Fiesta Bowl victory over the Oklahoma Sooners, West Virginia rushed for 349 yards which was the most ever given up by an Oklahoma team in a bowl game. Stanchek was also named to the 2007 Big East Academic All-American team.

Stanchek finished his junior season by playing in over 800 plays, recording 103 knockdowns over the year.

=== Senior season ===
Stanchek returned for his senior season as the team leader in career starts to the returning squad that featured rushers Pat White, Noel Devine, and Jock Sanders all returning. White and Devine both rushed for over 1,000 yards on the season, led by Stanchek and junior Greg Isdaner on the line. Along with being named a first-team All-Big East selection, Stanchek was a second-team All-American. He finished his career with 48 consecutive starts.

== Professional career ==
=== Atlanta Falcons ===
Stanchek was not drafted in the 2009 NFL draft, instead being signed by the Atlanta Falcons as an undrafted free agent. He was waived on September 4.

=== Cleveland Gladiators ===
Stanchek was signed on February 12, 2010 by the Cleveland Gladiators of the Arena Football 1 League.

== Coaching career ==
=== Indiana ===
Following his playing days, Stanchek joined the Indiana Hoosiers football staff as a graduate assistant working with the offensive line. He re-unite with Hoosiers offensive line coach Greg Frey, whom was the offensive line coach during Stanchek's junior season at West Virginia in 2007.

=== Alcorn State ===
Stanchek was hired by Jay Hopson to be Alcorn State University's Offensive Line coach before the 2014 season. He served in that role for Coach Hopson's replacement, Fred McNair (older brother of Steve) through the 2016 season. He was promoted to be the run game offensive coordinator for the 2017 season. On April 15, 2018 entering his fifth season with the Alcorn State University football program, Ryan Stancheck was elevated to the Offensive Coordinator. During the 2018 football campaign with Stancheck as the offensive coordinator the Alcorn Braves won the SWAC Conference Championship and the offensive led the conference in total yards.

=== Southern Miss ===
On January 24, 2019, Southern Miss University announced that it hired Stanchek to be its new Offensive Line coach. This reunites Stanchek with Head Coach Jay Hopson, who he worked under at Alcorn State for two seasons.

=== Florida A&M ===
In February 2021, Stanchek joined Willie Simmons' staff at Florida A&M as the co-offensive coordinator and offensive line coach. He helped lead the Rattlers to an 9–3 record and an appearance in the FCS playoffs.

=== Austin Peay ===
In January 2022, Stanchek joined Scotty Walden's staff at Austin Peay as the co-offensive coordinator and offensive line coach.
