= 2008 All-America college football team =

Official list of the best college football players of 2008

The 2008 All-America college football team is composed of the following All-American first teams: American Football Coaches Association (AFCA), Associated Press (AP), Football Writers Association of America (FWAA), Walter Camp Football Foundation, The Sporting News, Sports Illustrated, Pro Football Weekly, ESPN, CBS Sports, College Football News, Rivals.com, and Scout.com.

Being selected to the All-America college football team is an honor given annually to the best American college football players at their respective positions. The original All-America team was the 1889 All-America college football team selected by Caspar Whitney. The National Collegiate Athletic Association (NCAA), the governing body of American intercollegiate sports, officially recognizes All-Americans selected by the AFCA, AP, FWAA, Sporting News, and Walter Camp Foundation to determine consensus All-Americans (denoted bold). At least three of these five major selector organizations must select a player in order for him to be recognized as a "consensus" All-American by the NCAA.

== Offense ==
=== Quarterback ===
- Sam Bradford, Oklahoma (AP-1, TSN, CBS, ESPN, Rivals, WCFF-2)
- Colt McCoy, Texas (FWAA, WCFF, SI, AP-2)
- Graham Harrell, Texas Tech (AFCA)
- Matthew Stafford, Georgia (PFW)
- Tim Tebow, Florida (CFN)

=== Running back ===
- Shonn Greene, Iowa (AFCA, AP-1, FWAA, TSN, WCFF, CBS, CFN, ESPN, Rivals, SI)
- Javon Ringer, Michigan State (AP-1, WCFF)
- Donald Brown, Connecticut (TSN, CFN, ESPN, SI, AP-2, WCFF-2)
- Kendall Hunter, Oklahoma State (FWAA, Rivals)
- Knowshon Moreno, Georgia (AFCA, AP-2, WCFF-2)
- Jonathan Dwyer, Georgia Tech (PFW)
- MiQuale Lewis, Ball State (CBS)

=== Fullback ===
- Tony Fiammetta, Syracuse (PFW)

=== Wide receiver ===
- Michael Crabtree, Texas Tech (AFCA, AP-1, FWAA, TSN, WCFF, CBS, CFN, ESPN, PFW, Rivals, SI)
- Dez Bryant, Oklahoma State (AFCA, AP-1, TSN, WCFF, CFN, PFW, SI)
- Jarett Dillard, Rice (FWAA, CBS, ESPN, AP-2, WCFF)
- Austin Collie, BYU (CBS, AP-2)
- Jeremy Maclin, Missouri (Rivals)
- Percy Harvin, Florida (WCFF-2)

=== Tight end ===
- Chase Coffman, Missouri (AFCA, AP-1, FWAA, WCFF, CBS)
- Jermaine Gresham, Oklahoma (TSN, CFN, ESPN, PFW, Rivals, SI, AP-2, WCFF-2)

=== Tackles ===
- Andre Smith, Alabama (AFCA, AP-1, FWAA, TSN, WCFF, CBS, CFN, ESPN, PFW, Rivals, SI)
- Michael Oher, Ole Miss (AFCA, AP-1, FWAA, TSN, WCFF, CBS, CFN, ESPN, Rivals)
- Rylan Reed, Texas Tech (WCFF, SI)
- Jason Smith, Baylor (FWAA)
- Phil Loadholt, Oklahoma (CFN, SI)
- Russell Okung, Oklahoma State (PFW)
- Eugene Monroe, Virginia (AP-2, WCFF-2)
- Ryan Stanchek, West Virginia (WCFF-2)

=== Guards ===
- Duke Robinson, Oklahoma (AP-1, FWAA, TSN, WCFF, CBS, CFN, ESPN, Rivals, SI)
- Brandon Carter, Texas Tech (AFCA, TSN, AP-2)
- Andy Levitre, Oregon State (AFCA, PFW, AP-2)
- Herman Johnson, LSU (AP-1, WCFF-2)
- Mike Johnson, Alabama (PFW)
- Seth Olsen, Iowa (Rivals)
- Kraig Urbik, Wisconsin (ESPN)
- Trevor Canfield, Cincinnati (AP-2)
- Alex Boone, Ohio State (WCFF-2)

=== Center ===
- Antoine Caldwell, Alabama (AFCA, AP-1, TSN, SI)
- A. Q. Shipley, Penn State (FWAA, WCFF, CBS, CFN, ESPN, AP-2)
- Max Unger, Oregon (CBS, PFW)
- Alex Mack, California (Rivals, WCFF-2)

== Defense ==
=== Ends ===
- Brian Orakpo, Texas (AFCA, AP-1, FWAA, WCFF, TSN, ESPN, PFW, SI, CBS, CFN, Rivals)
- Jerry Hughes, TCU (FWAA, WCFF, TSN, ESPN, SI, CBS, CFN, Rivals, AP-2)
- Aaron Maybin, Penn State (AP-1, FWAA, WCFF, CBS, PFW)
- George Selvie, South Florida (AFCA, WCFF-2)
- Michael Johnson, Georgia Tech (AFCA)
- Nick Reed, Oregon (WCFF)
- Everette Brown, Florida State (AP-2, WCFF-2)

=== Tackle ===
- Terrence Cody, Alabama (AFCA, AP-1, FWAA, TSN, CBS, Rivals, SI, WCFF-2)
- Gerald McCoy, Oklahoma (TSN, CFN, PFW, Rivals, SI, AP-2)
- Peria Jerry, Ole Miss (AP-1, PFW, CFN, ESPN)
- Mitch King, Iowa (ESPN, AP-2, WCFF-2)

=== Linebacker ===
- Rey Maualuga, Southern California (AFCA, AP-1, FWAA, TSN, WCFF, CBS, CFN, ESPN, Rivals)
- Brandon Spikes, Florida (AFCA, AP-1, FWAA, TSN, WCFF, CFN, ESPN, Rivals, SI)
- James Laurinaitis, Ohio State (AFCA, AP-1, TSN, WCFF, PFW)
- Aaron Curry, Wake Forest (ESPN, PFW, SI, AP-2)
- Scott McKillop, Pittsburgh (FWAA, CBS, AP-2, WCFF-2)
- Brian Cushing, Southern California (SI, AP-2)
- Mark Herzlich, Boston College (CFN, PFW, Rivals)
- Michael Tauiliili, Duke (WCFF-2)
- Sean Weatherspoon, Missouri (WCFF-2)

=== Cornerback ===
- Malcolm Jenkins, Ohio State (AFCA, AP-1, FWAA, WCFF, CBS, CFN, ESPN, PFW, Rivals)
- Alphonso Smith, Wake Forest (AFCA, AP-1, FWAA, WCFF, CBS, ESPN, PFW)
- D. J. Moore, Vanderbilt (TSN, CFN, Rivals, SI, AP-2)
- Victor Harris, Virginia Tech (TSN, SI, AP-2)

=== Safety ===
- Eric Berry, Tennessee (AFCA, AP-1, FWAA, TSN, WCFF, CBS, CFN, ESPN, Rivals, SI)
- Taylor Mays, Southern California (AP-1, FWAA, TSN, WCFF, CBS, CFN, ESPN, PFW, SI)
- Rashad Johnson, Alabama (AFCA, Rivals, AP-2, WCFF-2)
- Morgan Burnett, Georgia Tech (PFW)
- Trimane Goddard, North Carolina (AP-2, WCFF-2)
- Mike Mickens, Cincinnati (WCFF-2)
- Trevard Lindley, Kentucky (WCFF-2)

== Special teams ==
=== Kicker ===
- Louie Sakoda, Utah (AFCA, AP-1, FWAA, TSN, WCFF, ESPN, PFW, SI)
- Graham Gano, Florida State (CBS, CFN, Rivals, AP-2, WCFF-2)

=== Punter ===
- Kevin Huber, Cincinnati (AFCA, AP-1, FWAA, Rivals, SI)
- T. J. Conley, Idaho (TSN, WCFF, CFN, ESPN, AP-2)
- Pat McAfee, West Virginia (CBS, WCFF-2)

=== All-purpose player / return specialist ===
- Brandon James, Florida (FWAA-RS, TSN, CBS, Rivals-PR)
- Jeremy Maclin, Missouri (AP-1, WCFF-KR, SI-AP)
- Percy Harvin, Florida (AFCA, Rivals-AP, AP-2)
- Joe Burnett, UCF (ESPN, SI-KR/PR, WCFF-2)
- Michael Ray Garvin, Florida State, (TSN-KR)
- Antonio Brown, Central Michigan (CFN)
- Perrish Cox, Oklahoma State (CBS-KR)
- Mardy Gilyard, Cincinnati (Rivals-KR)
- Travis Shelton, Temple (CFN-KR)
- Derrick Williams, Penn State (PFW-RS, WCFF-2)

== See also ==
- 2008 All-Big 12 Conference football team
- 2008 All-Big Ten Conference football team
- 2008 All-Pacific-10 Conference football team
- 2008 All-SEC football team
