= Bennie Blades =

American football player (born 1966)

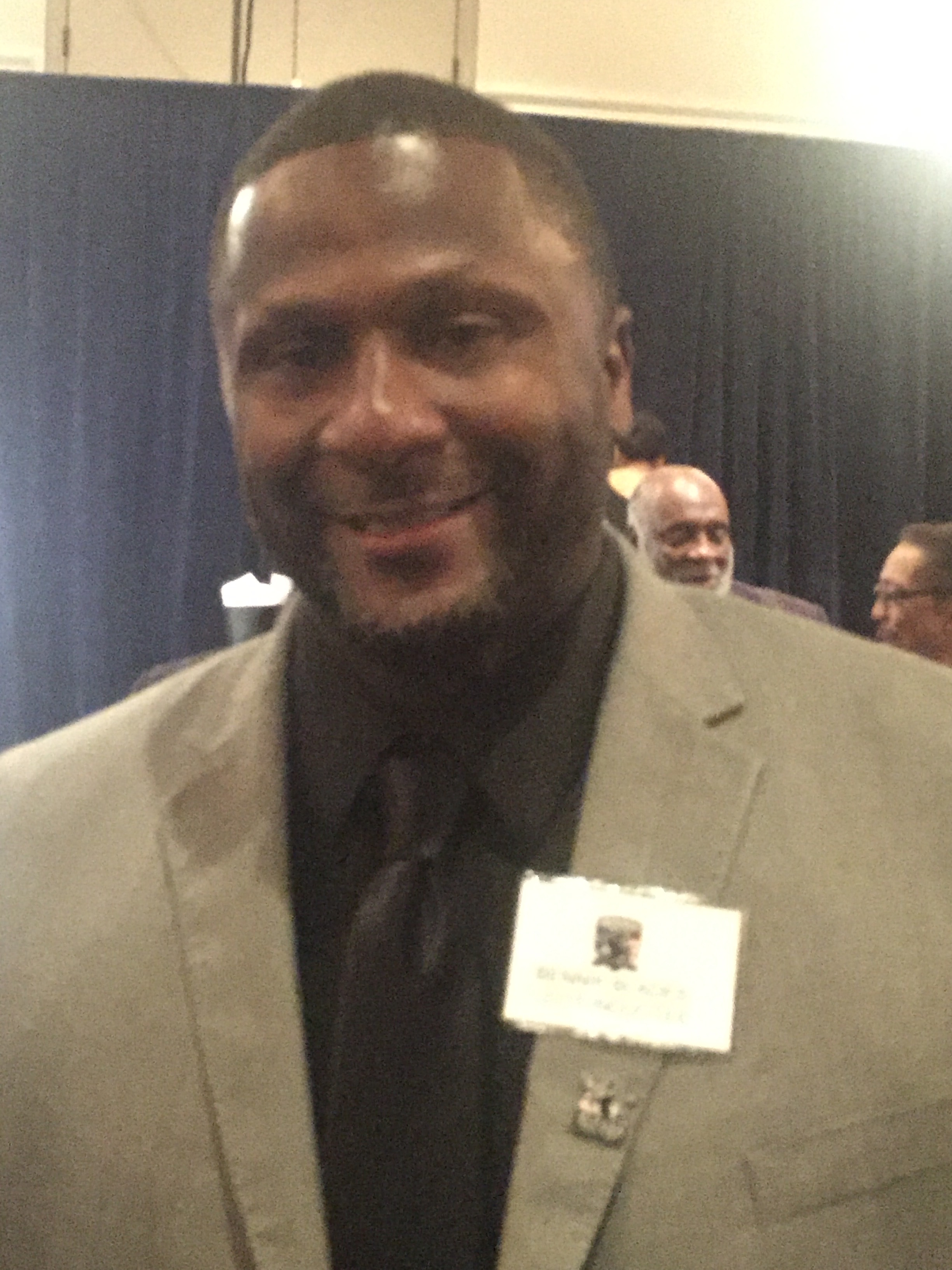
- Blades in 2015

No. 36
- Position: Safety

Personal information
- Born: September 3, 1966 (age 60); Fort Lauderdale, Florida, U.S.
- Listed height: 6 ft 0 in (1.83 m)
- Listed weight: 221 lb (100 kg)

Career information
- High school: Piper (Sunrise, Florida)
- College: Miami (FL) (1984–1987)
- NFL draft: 1988: 1st round, 3rd overall pick

Career history
- Detroit Lions (1988–1996); Seattle Seahawks (1997)

Awards and highlights
- 3× Second-team All-Pro (1988, 1991, 1992); Pro Bowl (1991); PFWA All-Rookie Team (1988); Detroit Lions 75th Anniversary Team; Detroit Lions All-Time Team; National champion (1987); Jim Thorpe Award (1987) (Note: Co-winner with Rickey Dixon); 2× Unanimous All-American (1987, 1986); Second-team AP All-Time All-American (2025)

Career NFL statistics
- Total tackles: 860
- Sacks: 5
- Forced fumbles: 9
- Fumble recoveries: 11
- Interceptions: 14
- Total touchdowns: 2
- Stats at Pro Football Reference
- College Football Hall of Fame

Horatio Benedict Blades Sr. (born September 3, 1966) is an American former professional football player who was a safety in the National Football League (NFL). A three-time All-Pro, Blades was named to both the Detroit Lions 75th Anniversary Team and the Detroit Lions All-Time Team. He played college football for the Miami Hurricanes.

== College career ==
Blades played a big part in the University of Miami's winning the 1987 NCAA National Championship. He also won the Jim Thorpe Award in that year and, in 2006, was named to the College Football Hall of Fame for his play with the Miami Hurricanes. He shares the University of Miami single season interception record with fellow Miami Hurricane Sean Taylor.

During his play at the University of Miami, he and the defensive secondary were nicknamed "Bennie and the Jets," a reference to the song by Elton John, for their speed, power, ability, and stand-out defensive play. Blades also was known for taunting and intimidating opposing players.

Blades was interviewed about his time at the University of Miami for the documentary The U, which premiered December 12, 2009 on ESPN.

== Professional career ==
Pre-draft measurables
Height	Weight	Hand span	40-yard dash	10-yard split	20-yard split	20-yard shuttle	Vertical jump	Broad jump	Bench press
6 ft 0 5/8 in (1.84 m)	216 lb (98 kg)	8 3/4 in (0.22 m)	4.53 s	1.64 s	2.70 s	4.18 s	33.0 in (0.84 m)	10 ft 1 in (3.07 m)	15 reps
All values from NFL Combine

Following his graduation from the University of Miami, Blades entered the 1988 NFL draft and was selected in the first round with the third overall pick. He spent ten seasons in the NFL. He played for the Detroit Lions from 1988 to 1996 and the 1997 season with the Seattle Seahawks, teaming up with his older brother, wide receiver Brian Blades, who also played collegiate football at the University of Miami.

During his time with the Lions, Blades was considered one of the most physical defensive backs in the NFL, even playing as a linebacker in certain passing situations toward the end of his career. Blades is widely considered to be one of the greatest defensive backs in Lions' history.

The Lions selected Blades with the third overall pick in the 1988 NFL Draft, and he went on to earn NFL All-Rookie honors for the 1988 season. He was selected to the Pro Bowl in 1991 - in addition to receiving First-team All-NFL and First-team All-NFC honors. He was the Lions’ Defensive MVP in 1992 and led the team with 78 tackles in 1996. He had two 100-tackle seasons in is first two seasons in Detroit.

An underrated professional player, Blades was a key component to the Lions’ defense that helped the team claim two NFC Central titles, and a berth in the 1991 NFC Championship game. He was a defensive captain for five years in Detroit and his 815 career tackles place him second on the Lions’ all-time list.

			Interception Stats			Defense Stats						
Year	Team	Games	INTs	Yards	TD	FF	FR	Yards	TD	Sacks	Tackles	Safety
1988	Detroit Lions	15	2	12	0	3	4	22	0	1.0	102	0
1989	Detroit Lions	16	0	0	0	2	1	0	0	0.0	100	0
1990	Detroit Lions	12	2	25	0	1	1	0	0	1.0	83	0
1991	Detroit Lions	16	1	14	0	2	3	21	0	0.0	93	0
1992	Detroit Lions	16	3	56	0	1	0	0	0	0.0	95	0
1993	Detroit Lions	4	0	0	0	0	0	0	0	0.0	23	0
1994	Detroit Lions	16	1	0	0	0	2	0	0	1.0	71	0
1995	Detroit Lions	16	1	0	0	0	0	0	0	1.0	69	1
1996	Detroit Lions	15	2	112	1	0	0	0	0	0.0	78	0
1997	Seattle Seahawks	10	2	11	0	0	0	0	0	1.0	58	0
Totals		136	14	230	1	9	11	43	0	5.0	772	1

- Career statistics from Pro Football Reference

== Personal life ==
Blades was the younger brother of former Seattle Seahawks wide receiver Brian Blades and the older brother of former San Francisco 49ers cornerback Al Blades.

Blades' has a blended family of eight children, including three boys: Horatio (H. B.), Jaylen and Tylan, and five girls: Elice, Ashley, Amber, Bianca and Alyssa.

On September 25, 2015, Blades was inducted into GridIron Greats.
