= H. B. Blades =

American football player (born 1984)

No. 54
- Position: Linebacker

Personal information
- Born: September 30, 1984 (age 42); Fort Lauderdale, Florida, U.S.
- Listed height: 5 ft 10 in (1.78 m)
- Listed weight: 242 lb (110 kg)

Career information
- High school: Plantation (Plantation, Florida)
- College: Pittsburgh
- NFL draft: 2007: 6th round, 179th overall pick

Career history
- Washington Redskins (2007–2010)

Awards and highlights
- First-team All-American (2006); Big East Defensive Player of the Year (2006); 3× First-team All-Big East (2004, 2005, 2006)

Career NFL statistics
- Total tackles: 140
- Pass deflections: 1
- Stats at Pro Football Reference

Horatio Benedict Blades Jr. (born September 30, 1984) is an American former professional football player who was a linebacker in the National Football League (NFL). He played college football for the Pittsburgh Panthers and was selected by the Washington Redskins in the sixth round of the 2007 NFL draft.

== Early life ==
Blades attended Plantation High School in Plantation, Florida where he set school records for tackles in a career (409), season (154), and game (21).

== College career ==
Blades became only the fifth player in school history to record over 400 career tackles. He started and played in 12 games during his senior season at Pittsburgh where he was a First-team All-American by the Football Writers Association of America and SportsIllustrated.com and was named Big East Defensive Player of the Year. He was also a First-team All-Big East for the third time. He recorded a career-high 147 tackles (86 solo), 10.5 tackles for a loss, one sack, two fumble recoveries, two interceptions and two blocked field goals as a senior.

== Professional career ==
Pre-draft measurables
Height	Weight	40-yard dash	10-yard split	20-yard split	20-yard shuttle	Three-cone drill	Vertical jump	Broad jump	Bench press
5 ft 10 3/4 in (1.80 m)	236 lb (107 kg)	4.69 s	1.58 s	2.70 s	4.36 s	6.98 s	32.0 in (0.81 m)	9 ft 5 in (2.87 m)	22 reps
All values from NFL Combine/Pro Day

Blades was selected in the sixth round (179th overall) of the 2007 NFL draft by the Washington Redskins. In his rookie season, he played mostly special teams and recorded 21 tackles. In 2008, he played 16 games with 5 starts and recorded 60 tackles for the Redskins.

Blades was re-signed on August 1, 2011. On September 3, the Redskins cut Blades just before the start of the 2011 season.

== NFL career statistics ==
Legend
**Bold**	Career high

=== Regular season ===
Year	Team	Games		Tackles					Interceptions					Fumbles			
Year	Team	GP	GS	Cmb	Solo	Ast	Sck	TFL	Int	Yds	TD	Lng	PD	FF	FR	Yds	TD
2007	WAS	16	0	20	15	5	0.0	0	0	0	0	0	0	0	0	0	0
2008	WAS	16	5	**60**	**40**	**20**	0.0	**1**	0	0	0	0	**1**	0	0	0	0
2009	WAS	16	1	41	32	9	0.0	0	0	0	0	0	0	0	0	0	0
2010	WAS	16	1	19	12	7	0.0	0	0	0	0	0	0	0	0	0	0
		64	7	140	99	41	0.0	1	0	0	0	0	1	0	0	0	0

=== Playoffs ===
Year	Team	Games		Tackles					Interceptions					Fumbles			
Year	Team	GP	GS	Cmb	Solo	Ast	Sck	TFL	Int	Yds	TD	Lng	PD	FF	FR	Yds	TD
2007	WAS	1	0	2	1	1	0.0	1	0	0	0	0	0	0	0	0	0
		1	0	2	1	1	0.0	1	0	0	0	0	0	0	0	0	0

== Personal life ==
Blades is the son of retired Pro Bowl defensive back Bennie Blades. He is also the nephew of retired Seattle Seahawks wide receiver Brian Blades and the late San Francisco 49ers safety Al Blades. He is currently a football coach at Indian Land High School in Indian Land, South Carolina.

On February 28, 2016, the Washington Redskins filed a lawsuit against Blades to recoup $40,000 the team mistakenly paid him in 2013. The Redskins originally paid Blades a $40,000 severance on September 28, 2012, and then mistakenly paid him an additional $40,000 on December 27, 2013. After arbitration, Blades agreed to repay $20,658.88 in 50 installments, taking out taxes and with-holdings, but he failed to make payments. The arbitrator in March 2016 ordered him to repay the full amount. Judge Alvin Hellerstein noted to terminate this case in favor of Blades paying back the NFLPA on August 3, 2016.
