= Bill Stewart (gridiron football) =

American football coach (1952–2012)

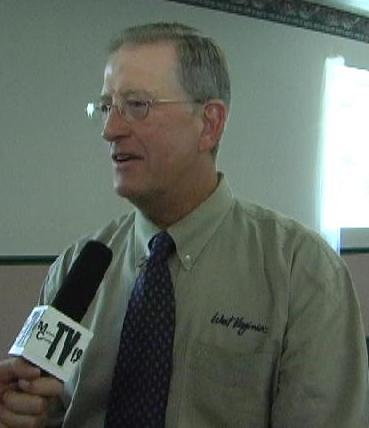

Biographical details
- Born: June 11, 1952; Grafton, West Virginia, U.S.
- Died: May 21, 2012 (aged 59); Roanoke, West Virginia, U.S.

Playing career
- 1972–1974: Fairmont State

Coaching career (HC unless noted)
- 1977–1978: Salem (assistant)
- 1979: North Carolina (assistant)
- 1980: Marshall (OL)
- 1981–1983: William & Mary (OL)
- 1984: Navy (OL)
- 1985–1987: North Carolina (OL)
- 1988–1989: Arizona State (TE/OT)
- 1990–1993: Air Force (DL)
- 1994–1996: VMI
- 1998: Montreal Alouettes (OL)
- 1999: Winnipeg Blue Bombers (OC)
- 2000–2007: West Virginia (QB/TE/ST)
- 2008–2010: West Virginia

Head coaching record
- Overall: 36–37
- Bowls: 2–2

Accomplishments and honors

Championships
- 1 Big East (2010)

William L. Stewart (June 11, 1952 – May 21, 2012), nicknamed "Stew", was an American football coach. He was named interim head coach of the West Virginia Mountaineers after Rich Rodriguez left for Michigan in December 2007. After leading the Mountaineers to a 48–28 victory over the Oklahoma Sooners in the Fiesta Bowl, he was named the school's 32nd head football coach on January 3, 2008. Stewart resigned in the summer of 2011. He was previously the head coach of Virginia Military Institute for three seasons.

== Playing career ==
Stewart was a 1975 education graduate of Fairmont State College, where he was a three-year letterman and team captain for the West Virginia Intercollegiate Athletic Conference (WVIAC) champions in 1974.

== Coaching career ==
=== Early career ===
Stewart's coaching career began at his alma mater of Fairmont State, where he was a student assistant coach for a season. He became an assistant coach at Sistersville High School in Sistersville, West Virginia, in 1975.

In 1977, he moved to Salem College, where he was an assistant football and head track coach for two seasons. In 1979, he was an assistant coach at the University of North Carolina. He was also assistant coach at Marshall University (1980), the College of William & Mary (1981–1983), the United States Naval Academy (1984), North Carolina a second time (1985–1987), Arizona State University (1988–1989), and the United States Air Force Academy (1990–1993).

=== VMI ===
In 1994, Stewart assumed the head coaching position at Virginia Military Institute (VMI). In three years, he compiled an 8–25 record. Stewart gave current Pittsburgh Steelers' head coach Mike Tomlin his first job as an assistant at VMI in 1995. Tomlin returned the favor by vouching for Stewart with the West Virginia University administration.

Stewart resigned in 1996 after making a racially insensitive comment towards a player regarding his on-field behavior. After what he believed to be excessive celebration by one of his players following a play, he told him "Don't let your actions give people reason to call you a n-----." Stewart was forced to resign and later sued VMI for money he thought he was owed. Stewart described the incident as "an isolated incident" that happened while he was "trying to help the kid", and has said he never uttered another slur since.

=== Canadian Football League ===
Stewart served as the offensive line coach for the Montreal Alouettes of the Canadian Football League in 1998. His line blocked for Mike Pringle, the first 2,000-yard rusher in CFL history. In 1999, he moved on to be the offensive coordinator of the Winnipeg Blue Bombers where he coached two all-conference receivers and a one thousand-yard rusher.

=== West Virginia ===
==== 2000–2007 ====
Head coach Don Nehlen hired Stewart at WVU in January, 2000 as the quarterbacks coach. Stewart was retained by Rich Rodriguez when he became the head coach after the 2000 season. Stewart remained the quarterbacks coach and special teams coach until 2007 when he moved to coach the tight ends and served as associate head coach.

==== 2008 season ====
Following Rodriguez's departure to become the head coach at the University of Michigan on December 16, 2007; Stewart was named interim head coach of the Mountaineers for the 2008 Fiesta Bowl. In that game Stewart led the team to a 48–28 upset win over the #3 Oklahoma Sooners. During the press conference following the awards ceremony, Fiesta Bowl MVP and West Virginia quarterback Pat White said of Stewart, "He needs that job. He deserves it, the head coaching job."

WVU booster and co-owner of the Arizona Diamondbacks Ken Kendrick, however, was unhappy with the hiring of Stewart. Kendrick called Stewart "overmatched" and said that he was "very concerned" for the future of WVU football.

On January 3, 2008, a day after the Fiesta Bowl victory, Stewart was announced as West Virginia's 32nd head coach. Stewart agreed to a five-year contract for $800,000 a year, totaling a $4 million base salary. Stewart hired former Mountaineer assistant coaches and players Steve Dunlap, David Lockwood, and Doc Holliday, along with assistant coach Chris Beatty and Dave Johnson. Stewart was also able to keep defensive coordinator Jeff Casteel and defensive line coach Bill Kirelawich.

On February 6, 2008, Stewart's recruiting class signed 23 letters of intent. The class did not include running back Terence Kerns, from Hargrave Military Academy, who later signed. Hawaiian center Benji Kemoeatu signed later in March as well. Jerome Swinton, a cornerback from Florida, was called “The best football player we have...he’s probably the best football player we recruited," by Stewart. The 2008 class, led by 5-star offensive guard Josh Jenkins from Parkersburg, West Virginia, was ranked 37th by Scout.com and 44th by Rivals.com.

West Virginia opened up the 2008 season with a 48–21 victory over Villanova, in which Pat White threw for a career-high 5 touchdowns. However, the Mountaineers were then upset by East Carolina, 24–3. White was held under 100 yards passing and rushing, and running back Noel Devine was held under 100 yards rushing for the second consecutive game. The Mountaineers then traveled to Boulder, Colorado, where they were defeated by the Colorado Buffaloes, 17–14, in overtime. The loss was highlighted by a 23-yard field goal miss in overtime by senior kicker Pat McAfee that allowed Colorado to kick a field goal to win the game. Before conference play opened, the Mountaineers defeated Marshall, 27–3, to even their record at 2–2. Stewart followed up the victory with a 24–17 win over Rutgers, and then a 17–6 win over Syracuse to produce a 4–2 record. Next, the Mountaineers rebounded from being down 17–3 before halftime against the Auburn Tigers, to score 31 unanswered points on the way to a 34–17 victory in Morgantown. The Mountaineers then upset the #25 Connecticut Huskies 35–13 for the Mountaineers' first road victory of the season and to move them into the national polls for the first time since before the loss to Colorado (20 – AP, 23 – USA Today, 25 – BCS). However, they dropped out of the national rankings after a 26–23 overtime loss to Big East champion Cincinnati. After a 35–21 win over Louisville, the Mountaineers dropped the Backyard Brawl, 19–15, to #25 Pittsburgh. The Mountaineers finished out the regular season with a 13–7 victory over USF in a "White-Out" to honor Pat White. The team finished 9–4 in Stewart's inaugural season with a 31–30 victory over #25 North Carolina in the Meineke Car Care Bowl.

==== 2009 season ====
Stewart and the coaching staff at WVU opened up the 2009 football season by signing the #23/#27 (Scout.com/Rivals.com) recruiting class, which included the #3 quarterback Eugene Smith, the #5 running back Tavon Austin, and the #8 receiver Logan Heastie. On the field, the Mountaineers had a perfect record at home, including a 19–16 upset of then-#8 Pittsburgh in the Backyard Brawl. However, the team's record away from home included three regular season losses (at Auburn, at South Florida, and at Cincinnati). The Mountaineers also lost in the Gator Bowl versus Florida State in Bobby Bowden's final game as head football coach of the Seminoles.

==== 2010 season ====
Stewart coached West Virginia to a second-straight 9–3 regular season record and a share of the Big East title (although the BCS bid went to the University of Connecticut due to a tiebreaker edge). However, for the second consecutive season, the Mountaineers played poorly in their bowl game, suffering a 23–7 loss to NC State in the Champs Sports Bowl in Orlando, Florida on December 28. The game marked a season low for points scored by WVU and season highs for points allowed, turnovers, and margin of defeat. After the regular season ended, it was announced that Stewart would coach the team for the 2011 season, after which he would step down and take a position in the WVU Athletic Department. He would be succeeded as head coach by Dana Holgorsen, who would spend 2011 as the team's offensive coordinator.

==== 2011 coaching controversy ====
On June 10, 2011, Stewart resigned and Holgorsen took over as head coach, effective immediately. The relationship between Stewart and Holgorsen had been strained from the beginning, and came to a head in late May when Colin Dunlap, a journalist with KDKA-FM in Pittsburgh, reported that Stewart had asked him while he was a reporter with the Pittsburgh Post-Gazette, and a reporter with The Charleston Gazette to dig up dirt about Holgorsen and smear his name in headlines for their respective papers. These calls were made in December before Holgorsen even came to West Virginia. While athletic director Oliver Luck was unable to fully substantiate the reporters' claims, he determined that Stewart had become too much of a distraction and forced Stewart's immediate resignation. WVU and Stewart subsequently negotiated a buyout of Stewart's contract. It was reported that Stewart was fired for "conduct detrimental to the university," but was allowed to publicly save face by resigning.

== Personal life and death ==
Stewart was a native of New Martinsville, West Virginia. He married the former Karen Kacor on July 1, 1978. He had one son, Blaine. He was a Christian.

Stewart died on May 21, 2012, of an apparent heart attack. After collapsing while playing golf with former WVU athletic director Ed Pastilong at Stonewall Resort near Roanoke, West Virginia, he was taken to a nearby hospital in Weston, where he was pronounced dead.

== Head coaching record ==
Year	Team	Overall	Conference	Standing	Bowl/playoffs	Coaches^{#}	AP^{°}
VMI Keydets (Southern Conference) (1994–1996)
1994	VMI	1–10	1–7	9th			
1995	VMI	4–7	3–5	6th			
1996	VMI	3–8	3–5	6th			
VMI:		8–25	7–17				
West Virginia Mountaineers (Big East Conference) (2007–2011)
2007	West Virginia	1–0 (Note: Stewart served as interim head coach for the Fiesta Bowl after Rich Rodriguez left for Michigan. West Virginia credits the 2007 regular season to Rodriguez and the Fiesta Bowl to Stewart.)			W Fiesta^{†}	6	6
2008	West Virginia	9–4	5–2	T–2nd	W Meineke Car Care		23
2009	West Virginia	9–4	5–2	T–2nd	L Gator	22	25
2010	West Virginia	9–4	5–2	T–1st	L Champs Sports		
West Virginia:		28–12	15–6				
Total:		36–37					
National championship Conference title Conference division title or championship game berth
^{†}Indicates Bowl Coalition, Bowl Alliance, BCS, or CFP / New Years' Six bowl.; ^{#}Rankings from final Coaches Poll.; ^{°}Rankings from final AP Poll.
