= Steve Kragthorpe =

American football coach (1965–2024)

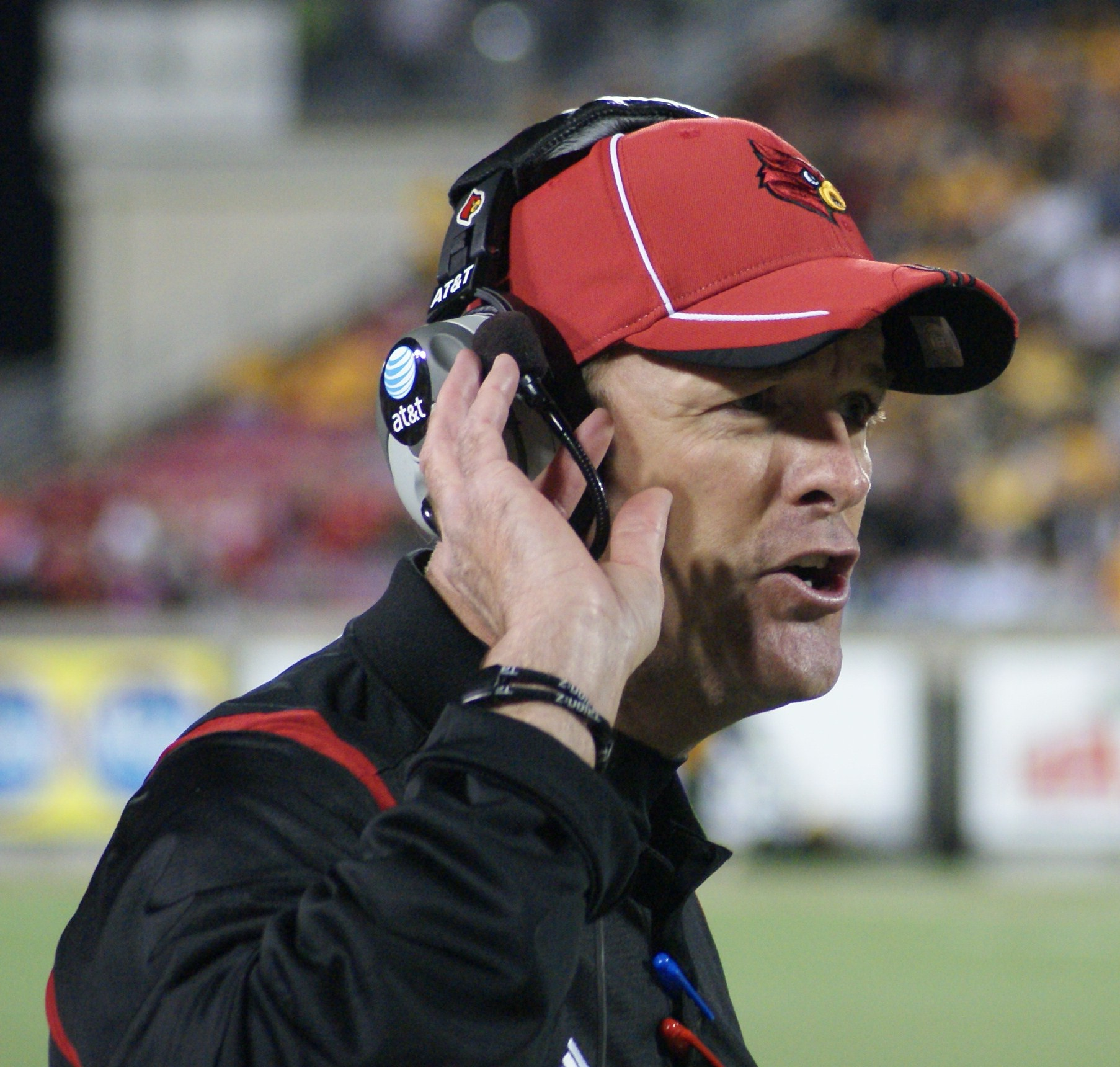
- Kragthorpe as Louisville head coach in 2009

Biographical details
- Born: April 28, 1965; Missoula, Montana, U.S.
- Died: August 4, 2024 (aged 59)

Playing career
- 1983–1984: Eastern New Mexico
- 1985–1987: West Texas
- Position: Quarterback

Coaching career (HC unless noted)
- 1990–1991: Northern Arizona (QB)
- 1992–1993: Northern Arizona (OC)
- 1994–1995: North Texas (OC)
- 1996: Boston College (QB)
- 1997: Texas A&M (QB)
- 1998–2000: Texas A&M (OC)
- 2001–2002: Buffalo Bills (QB)
- 2003–2006: Tulsa
- 2007–2009: Louisville
- 2011–2012: LSU (QB)

Head coaching record
- Overall: 44–43
- Bowls: 1–2

Accomplishments and honors

Championships
- 1 C-USA (2005)

Awards
- WAC Coach of the Year (2003)

Steven Jon Kragthorpe (April 28, 1965 – August 4, 2024) was an American college football head coach. He served as the head coach for the Tulsa Golden Hurricane from 2003 through 2006 and the Louisville Cardinals from 2007 to 2009. After his head coaching career he was an administrative assistant for the Louisiana State University football program after previously serving as quarterbacks coach for the Tigers football team.

== Early career ==
Kragthorpe was born in Missoula, Montana, but attended Highland High School in Pocatello, Idaho. Kragthorpe played high school football with ESPN commentator Merril Hoge. Both graduated from Highland High School in 1983.

He was recruited by Bill Kelly to play at Eastern New Mexico University, where he played quarterback in 1983 and '84. When Kelly left ENMU for West Texas State (now West Texas A&M University), Kragthorpe followed him. After sitting out the 1985 season, he played in 1986 and '87. He started 11 games as a senior and completed 179 of 344 passes for 1,980 yards and nine TDs.

Kragthorpe earned a bachelor's degree in business administration in 1988 from West Texas State and received his MBA in 1989 from Oregon State University. He then spent more than a decade as an assistant coach at several colleges. At age 26, he became offensive coordinator under Steve Axman at Northern Arizona University. He left in 1994 to join Matt Simon's coaching staff at the University of North Texas. After leaving the state of Texas for one year, serving as quarterbacks coach under Dan Henning at Boston College in 1996, Kragthorpe came back to join R. C. Slocum's staff at Texas A&M. He served as quarterbacks coach in 1997 before replacing Steve Marshall as offensive coordinator in 1998. Texas A&M won a Big 12 championship in 1998.

In 2001, Kragthorpe left the collegiate ranks to become quarterback coach under head coach Gregg Williams for the Buffalo Bills. He coached quarterback Drew Bledsoe during one of Bledsoe's better seasons in the NFL. In 2003, Kragthorpe took over his first head coaching position, succeeding Keith Burns at the University of Tulsa.

== Head coaching career ==
=== Tulsa ===
In his first season at Tulsa, Kragthorpe guided a program that had won just two games during the previous two seasons to an 8–5 record and its first bowl game appearance since 1991. In 2005, Tulsa won the Conference USA championship and then went on to beat Fresno State in the AutoZone Liberty Bowl.

=== Louisville ===
Kragthorpe took over the University of Louisville vacancy on January 9, 2007. He replaced former head coach, and fellow Montanan, Bobby Petrino, who agreed to serve as head coach of the Atlanta Falcons. Kragthorpe's contract was a $1.1-million-a-year contract (with bonuses) for five years. Louisville hired Kragthorpe in what many consider to be a "whirlwind courtship," becoming the head coach in less than 48 hours after Petrino submitted his resignation.

In 2007, Kragthorpe carried around a baseball bat in an attempt to motivate his players to become "Better After Today" and placed mousetraps around the locker room in another effort at motivation.

Although Louisville started the 2007 season as #10 in the AP poll and returned the majority of the 2007 Orange Bowl champion team, including Heisman Trophy candidate Brian Brohm at quarterback, the Cards finished the season a disappointing 6–6, including a loss to Syracuse in which the Cardinals were 37-point favorites. Nine consecutive winning seasons and bowl games came to an end under the direction of Kragthorpe, even though he led a team that had enough talent to see five of its players taken in the NFL draft. Rumors swirled on whether Kragthorpe would return for a second season. After days of speculation whether Kragthorpe could leave for the vacant head coaching job at Southern Methodist University, Louisville sports information director Rocco Gasparro confirmed on November 21, that there is a "50–50 chance" Kragthorpe will be at SMU in 2008. In a press conference that same day Kragthorpe ruled out any speculations that he was entertaining an offer from SMU, saying he was "100 percent committed" to Louisville. Following Louisville's dismal 2007 season, Kragthorpe released both offensive coordinator Charlie Stubbs and defensive coordinator Mike Cassity and then hired Michigan defensive coordinator Ron English to guide the Cardinals defense and handed the offensive coordinator duties to Jeff Brohm, who was expected to install an offense similar to that run by former Louisville head coach Bobby Petrino.

==== 2008 ====
Kragthorpe opened his second season at Louisville with very low expectations. A year removed from being a preseason top 10 program, the Cardinals entered the 2008 season picked 7th in the eight-team Big East Conference by members of the media. Louisville hosted in-state rival Kentucky on Sunday, August 31, falling to the Wildcats 27–2 in Louisville's first opening-day loss since 2002. On October 25, 2008, Louisville defeated a ranked South Florida team 24–20. Kragthorpe also lost to Syracuse in back-to-back seasons, giving Syracuse head coach Greg Robinson two of his three Big East wins as a head coach. Following the Syracuse loss, Kragthorpe's Cardinals lost the next four games capped off by a 63–14 loss to Rutgers (Louisville's worst defeat since 1987). This marked the team's first losing season since 1997.

Following a second straight losing season in 2009, Louisville fired Kragthorpe shortly after the conclusion of the season.

== Later coaching positions ==
Following his Louisville stint, Kragthorpe accepted the wide receivers coaching position at Texas A&M in February 2010, but later resigned in July 2010 due to a family member's illness. After spending the 2010 season out of football, on January 20, 2011, he was hired as the new offensive coordinator at LSU.

On August 4, 2011, Kragthorpe stepped down from the offensive coordinator position at LSU, due to Parkinson's disease. He remained as quarterbacks coach through the 2012 season. Following the season, Kragthorpe assumed the role of special assistant to the head coach and chief of staff for the LSU football program.

After LSU lost to Texas A&M 72–74 in seven overtime periods on November 28, 2018, Kragthorpe was reportedly punched in the chest by a Texas A&M team staff member. The punch reportedly hit where Kragthorpe's brain pacemaker is implanted. Kevin Faulk, LSU Director of Player Development, physically retaliated against the Texas A&M staff member. The staff member was identified as Cole Fisher, Jimbo Fisher's nephew. After the game, it was reported that Kragthorpe exaggerated the claim and that he was in fact simply shoved after getting into a verbal altercation with Cole Fisher.

== Personal life and death ==
Kragthorpe and his wife had three sons. His brother, Kurt, is a sports columnist for The Salt Lake Tribune; their father, Dave Kragthorpe, was also a college football coach, most notably at Oregon State. Steve's son, Brad, the current Cincinnati Bengals' quarterback coach, was the quarterback for Holland Hall, a private prep school in Tulsa, where he was rated as one of the top high school quarterbacks in the state.

Kragthorpe was diagnosed with Parkinson's disease in 2011. He died from complications of the disease on August 4, 2024, at the age of 59.

== Head coaching record ==
Year	Team	Overall	Conference	Standing	Bowl/playoffs
Tulsa Golden Hurricane (Western Athletic Conference) (2003–2004)
2003	Tulsa	8–5	6–2	T–2nd	L Humanitarian
2004	Tulsa	4–8	3–5	T–6th	
Tulsa Golden Hurricane (Conference USA) (2005–2006)
2005	Tulsa	9–4	6–2	1st	W Liberty
2006	Tulsa	8–5	5–3	3rd (West)	L Armed Forces
Tulsa:		29–22	20–12		
Louisville Cardinals (Big East Conference) (2007–2009)
2007	Louisville	6–6	3–4	T–5th	
2008	Louisville	5–7	1–6	8th	
2009	Louisville	4–8	1–6	7th	
Louisville:		15–21	5–16		
Total:		44–43			
National championship Conference title Conference division title or championship game berth
