= 2008 West Virginia Mountaineers football team =

American college football season

2008 West Virginia Mountaineers football

Meineke Car Care Bowl champion

Meineke Car Care Bowl, W 31–30 vs. North Carolina
- Conference: Big East Conference

Ranking
- AP: No. 23
- Record: 9–4 (5–2 Big East)
- Head coach: Bill Stewart (1st season)
- Offensive coordinator: Jeff Mullen (1st season)
- Offensive scheme: Spread
- Defensive coordinator: Jeff Casteel (7th season)
- Base defense: 3–3–5
- Home stadium: Milan Puskar Stadium

2008 Big East Conference football standings
	Conf.			Overall
Team	W		L	W		L
No. 17 Cincinnati $	6	–	1	11	–	3
Pittsburgh	5	–	2	9	–	4
No. 23 West Virginia	5	–	2	9	–	4
Rutgers	5	–	2	8	–	5
Connecticut	3	–	4	8	–	5
South Florida	2	–	5	8	–	5
Louisville	1	–	6	5	–	7
Syracuse	1	–	6	3	–	9
$ – BCS representative as conference champion; Rankings from AP Poll

The 2008 West Virginia Mountaineers football team represented West Virginia University as a member of the Big East Conference during the 2008 NCAA Division I FBS football season. Led by first-year head coach Bill Stewart, the Mountaineers compiled an overall record of 9–4 with a mark of 5–2 in conference play, placing in a three-way tie for second in the Big East. West Virginia was invited the Meineke Car Care Bowl, where the Mountaineers defeated North Carolina. The team played home games at Milan Puskar Stadium in Morgantown, West Virginia.

Stewart took over as the interim head coach at the end of the 2007 season after the departure of head coach Rich Rodriguez to the University of Michigan.

== Schedule ==
Date	Time	Opponent	Rank	Site	TV	Result	Attendance	Source
August 30	3:30 p.m.	Villanova*	No. 8	Milan Puskar Stadium; Morgantown, WV	ESPN Plus	W 48–21	60,566	
September 6	4:30 p.m.	at East Carolina*	No. 8	Dowdy–Ficklen Stadium; Greenville, NC	ESPN	L 3–24	43,610	
September 18	8:30 p.m.	at Colorado*	No. 21	Folsom Field; Boulder, CO	ESPN	L 14–17 ^{OT}	51,883	
September 27	3:30 p.m.	Marshall*		Milan Puskar Stadium; Morgantown, WV (Friends of Coal Bowl)	ESPN Plus	W 27–3	60,154	
October 4	12:00 p.m.	Rutgers		Milan Puskar Stadium; Morgantown, WV	ESPN Plus	W 24–17	59,122	
October 11	12:00 p.m.	Syracuse^{†}		Milan Puskar Stadium; Morgantown, WV (rivalry)	ESPNU	W 17–6	58,133	
October 23	7:30 p.m.	Auburn*		Milan Puskar Stadium; Morgantown, WV (Gold Rush)	ESPN	W 34–17	60,765	
November 1	12:00 p.m.	at Connecticut		Rentschler Field; East Hartford, CT	ESPN Plus	W 35–13	40,000	
November 8	7:00 p.m.	Cincinnati	No. 20	Milan Puskar Stadium; Morgantown, WV	ESPNU	L 23–26 ^{OT}	59,834	
November 22	12:00 p.m.	at Louisville		Papa John's Cardinal Stadium; Louisville, KY	ESPN	W 35–21	34,796	
November 28	12:00 p.m.	at Pittsburgh		Heinz Field; Pittsburgh, PA (Backyard Brawl)	ABC	L 15–19	63,019	
December 6	8:00 p.m.	South Florida		Milan Puskar Stadium; Morgantown, WV	ESPN2	W 13–7	48,019	
December 27	1:00 p.m.	vs. North Carolina*		Bank of America Stadium; Charlotte, NC (Meineke Car Care Bowl)	ESPN	W 31–30	73,712	
*Non-conference game; ^{†}Homecoming; Rankings from AP Poll released prior to the game; All times are in Eastern time

== Rankings ==
Ranking movements Legend: ██ Increase in ranking ██ Decrease in ranking — = Not ranked
	Week																
Poll	Pre	1	2	3	4	5	6	7	8	9	10	11	12	13	14	15	Final
AP	8	8	25	21	—	—	—	—	—	—	20	—	—	—	—	—	23
Coaches	8	8	24	22	—	—	—	—	—	—	23	—	—	25	—	—	—
Harris	Not released				—	—	—	—	—	—	22	—	—	—	—	—	Not released
BCS	Not released							—	—	—	25	—	—	—	—	—	Not released

== Spring Game ==
The Gold & Blue Spring Game was held on Saturday, April 19, 2008, at Mountaineer Field. A record crowd of over 25,000 fans attended as the Gold defeated the Blue 59–15. Kicker Pat McAfee was four-for-four on field goals with a long of 47 yards, and starting quarterback Pat White and backup Jarrett Brown both had touchdown passes. Brown also had a four-yard touchdown run and two backup kickers hit a field goal each. The defense recorded six sacks in total, and walk-on defensive back Darnell Christian led all corners with three passes deflected. Sophomore linebacker Pat Lazear had the only interception on the game off of a White pass. Backup running back led all ballcarriers with 54 yards on 17 carries while sophomore Brandon Hogan led all receivers with 49 yards on six catches.

== Game summaries ==
=== Syracuse ===
Team	1	2	3	4	Total
Syracuse	3	3	0	0	6
• West Virginia	0	7	0	10	17

- Date: October 11
- Location: Milan Puskar Stadium, Morgantown, WV
- Game start: Noon EST
- Television network: ESPNU

Scoring summary
Q1	5:11	SYR	Shadle 26 yard field goal	SYR 3–0
Q2	7:39	WVU	Sanders 12 yard pass from Brown (McAfee kick)	WVU 7–3
Q2	1:03	SYR	Shadle 53 yard field goal	WVU 7–6
Q4	11:41	WVU	McAfee 33 yard field goal	WVU 10–6
Q4	4:16	WVU	Devine 92 yard run (McAfee kick)	WVU 17–6

- Noel Devine 18 Rush, 188 Yds

=== Auburn ===
Team	1	2	3	4	Total
Auburn	3	14	0	0	17
• West Virginia	0	10	10	14	34

- Date: October 23
- Location: Milan Puskar Stadium, Morgantown, WV
- Game start: 7:30 p.m. EST
- Television network: ESPN

Scoring summary
Q1	2:05	AUB	Byrum 19 yard field goal	AUB 3–0
Q2	13:25	AUB	Lester 16 yard pass from Burns (Byrum kick)	AUB 10–0
Q2	10:58	WVU	McAfee 23 yard field goal	AUB 10–3
Q2	10:20	AUB	Burns 9 yard run (Byrum kick)	AUB 17–3
Q2	6:37	WVU	Arnett 44 yard pass from White (McAfee kick)	AUB 17–10
Q3	10:45	WVU	McAfee 42 yard field goal	AUB 17–13
Q3	4:06	WVU	Jalloh 2 yard pass from White (McAfee kick)	WVU 20–17
Q4	11:44	WVU	Jalloh 32 yard pass from White (McAfee kick)	WVU 27–17
Q4	2:26	WVU	Devine 30 yard run (McAfee kick)	WVU 34–17

== Personnel ==
=== Coaching staff ===
Head coach Bill Stewart was the Mountaineers 32nd head coach in school history. He returned defensive coordinator Jeff Casteel and defensive line coach Bill Kirelawich. His new hirings were associate head coach, recruiting coordinator, fullback, and tight ends coach Doc Holliday, assistant head coach and safeties coach Steve Dunlap, running backs coach Chris Beatty, offensive line coach Dave Johnson, and cornerbacks coach David Lockwood. Jeff Mullen, former quarterbacks coach at Wake Forest, was announced as the offensive coordinator and quarterbacks coach. The receivers coach was named on January 29, Lonnie Galloway, the receivers coach from Appalachian State.

=== Recruiting class ===
College recruiting information
Name	Hometown	School	Height	Weight	40^{‡}	Commit date
John Bassler; OL	Union Bridge, MD	Francis Scott Key HS	6 ft 4 in (1.93 m)	285 lb (129 kg)	5.40	Jul 3, 2007
John Bassler; OL	Recruit ratings: Scout: Rivals: (40)					
Tyler Bitancurt; K	Springfield, VA	West Springfield HS	6 ft 0 in (1.83 m)	170 lb (77 kg)	N/A	Dec 9, 2007
Tyler Bitancurt; K	Recruit ratings: Scout: Rivals: (40)					
Brantwon Bowser; DB	Phoenix, AZ	Phoenix Community College	6 ft 1 in (1.85 m)	190 lb (86 kg)	4.50	Jan 7, 2008
Brantwon Bowser; DB	Recruit ratings: Scout: Rivals:					
Jeff Braun; DT	Westminster, MD	West Hills HS	6 ft 4 in (1.93 m)	300 lb (140 kg)	5.50	Nov 25, 2006
Jeff Braun; DT	Recruit ratings: Scout: Rivals: (74)					
Ryan Clarke; FB	Hyattsville, MD	Dematha Catholic HS	6 ft 0 in (1.83 m)	235 lb (107 kg)	Feb 3, 2008	
Ryan Clarke; FB	Recruit ratings: Scout: Rivals: (40)					
J.J. Dorsey; ATH	Winchester, VA	John Handley HS	620 ft 1 in (189.00 m)	185 lb (84 kg)	4.60	May 23, 2007
J.J. Dorsey; ATH	Recruit ratings: Scout: Rivals: (40)					
Tevita Finau; DL	Phoenix, AZ	Phoenix Community College	6 ft 5 in (1.96 m)	275 lb (125 kg)	4.80	Feb 1, 2008
Tevita Finau; DL	Recruit ratings: Scout: Rivals:					
Larry Ford; DL	Coffeyville, KS	Coffeyville Community College	6 ft 4 in (1.93 m)	250 lb (110 kg)	4.80	Oct 16, 2007
Larry Ford; DL	Recruit ratings: Scout: Rivals:					
Corey Freeman; DL	University Heights, OH	Cleveland Heights HS	6 ft 3 in (1.91 m)	210 lb (95 kg)	4.52	Jan 24, 2008
Corey Freeman; DL	Recruit ratings: Scout: Rivals: (40)					
Zach Hulce; HB	Puyallup, WA	Glendale Junior College	5 ft 10 in (1.78 m)	200 lb (91 kg)	4.41	Feb 27, 2008
Zach Hulce; HB	Recruit ratings: Scout:					
Josh Jenkins; OL	Parkersburg, WV	Parkersburg HS	6 ft 3 in (1.91 m)	303 lb (137 kg)	Feb 6, 2008	
Josh Jenkins; OL	Recruit ratings: Scout: Rivals: (80)					
Benji Kemoeatu; OL	Kahuku, HI	Kahuku HS	6 ft 3 in (1.91 m)	315 lb (143 kg)	Feb 6, 2008	
Benji Kemoeatu; OL	Recruit ratings: Scout: Rivals: (76)					
Terence Kerns; RB	Chatham, VA	Hargrave Military Academy	6 ft 1 in (1.85 m)	225 lb (102 kg)	4.55	Apr 12, 2006
Terence Kerns; RB	Recruit ratings: Scout: Rivals: (77)					
Joey Madsen; OL	Chardon, OH	Chardon HS	6 ft 4 in (1.93 m)	275 lb (125 kg)	5.00	Jul 12, 2007
Joey Madsen; OL	Recruit ratings: Scout: Rivals: (40)					
Donovan Miles; LB	Stafford, VA	Brooke Point HS	6 ft 1 in (1.85 m)	225 lb (102 kg)	4.50	Jun 5, 2007
Donovan Miles; LB	Recruit ratings: Scout: Rivals: (78)					
Jatavious Miller; LB	Pahokee, FL	Pahokee HS	6 ft 0 in (1.83 m)	203 lb (92 kg)	Feb 6, 2008	
Jatavious Miller; LB	Recruit ratings: Scout: Rivals: (67)					
Chris Palmer; DL	Philadelphia, PA	St. John Neumann HS	6 ft 2 in (1.88 m)	292 lb (132 kg)	5.01	Jun 29, 2007
Chris Palmer; DL	Recruit ratings: Scout: Rivals: (73)					
Mark Rodgers; RB	Lawndale, CA	Leuzinger HS	5 ft 9 in (1.75 m)	180 lb (82 kg)	4.55	Apr 1, 2008
Mark Rodgers; RB	Recruit ratings: Scout: (40)					
Robert Sands; LB	North Bergen, NJ	North Bergen HS	6 ft 6 in (1.98 m)	196 lb (89 kg)	4.59	Feb 6, 2008
Robert Sands; LB	Recruit ratings: Scout: Rivals: (40)					
D.J. Shaw; DL	Wesson, MS	Copiah-Lincoln	6 ft 2 in (1.88 m)	285 lb (129 kg)	Jan 28, 2008	
D.J. Shaw; DL	Recruit ratings: Scout: Rivals:					
Bernard Smith; LB	Atlanta, GA	Mays HS	6 ft 2 in (1.88 m)	220 lb (100 kg)	4.71	Jan 27, 2008
Bernard Smith; LB	Recruit ratings: Scout: Rivals: (75)					
Courtney Stuart; DB	Phoenix, AZ	Phoenix Community College	6 ft 2 in (1.88 m)	220 lb (100 kg)	4.45	Jan 23, 2008
Courtney Stuart; DB	Recruit ratings: Scout: Rivals:					
Jerome Swinton; DB	Daytona Beach, FL	Seabreeze Beach HS	5 ft 8 in (1.73 m)	160 lb (73 kg)	Feb 6, 2008	
Jerome Swinton; DB	Recruit ratings: Scout: Rivals: (78)					
Tyler Urban; FB	North Huntingdon, PA	Norwin SHS	6 ft 4 in (1.93 m)	240 lb (110 kg)	Feb 2, 2008	
Tyler Urban; FB	Recruit ratings: Scout: Rivals: (74)					
Coley White; QB	Daphne, AL	Daphne HS	6 ft 1 in (1.85 m)	170 lb (77 kg)	4.50	Feb 5, 2008
Coley White; QB	Recruit ratings: Scout: Rivals: (40)					
J.D. Woods; WR	Naples, FL	Golden Gate HS	6 ft 2 in (1.88 m)	190 lb (86 kg)	4.50	Feb 5, 2008
J.D. Woods; WR	Recruit ratings: Scout: Rivals: (40)					
Jorge Wright; DL	Miami, FL	Dr. Michael M. Krop HS	6 ft 3 in (1.91 m)	260 lb (120 kg)	Jan 30, 2008	
Jorge Wright; DL	Recruit ratings: Scout: Rivals: (40)					
Overall recruit ranking: Scout: 36 Rivals: 43
‡ Refers to 40-yard dash; Note: In many cases, Scout, Rivals, 247Sports, On3, and ESPN may conflict in their listings of height, weight and 40 time.; In these cases, the average was taken. ESPN grades are on a 100-point scale.; Sources: "West Virginia Commit List for 2008". Rivals.; "Scout.com Football Recruiting". Scout.; "RecruitTracker 2008: West Virginia". ESPN.; "Scout.com Team Recruiting Rankings". Scout.; "2008 Team Ranking". Rivals.com.

== Statistics ==
=== Team ===
	Team	Opp
Scoring		
Points per game		
First downs		
Rushing		
Passing		
Penalty		
Total offense		
Avg per play		
Avg per game		
Fumbles-Lost		
Penalties-Yards		
Avg per game		

	Team	Opp
Punts-Yards		
Avg per punt		
Time of possession/Game		
3rd down conversions		
4th down conversions		
Touchdowns scored		
Field goals-Attempts-Long		
PAT-Attempts		
Attendance		
Games/Avg per Game		

==== Scores by quarter ====
	1	2	3	4	Total
WVU					0
Opponents					0

=== Offense ===
==== Rushing ====
Name	GP-GS	Att	Yards	Avg	TD	Long	Avg/G
Noel Devine	8–8	132	909	6.9	3	92	113.3
Pat White	7–7	102	545	5.3	44	4	77.9
Jock Sanders	8–8	30	168	5.6	19	2	21
Jarrett Brown	5–1	32	157	4.9	35	1	31.4
Mark Rodgers	5–0	12	69	5.8	19	0	13.8
Total							
Opponents							

==== Passing ====
Name	GP-GS	Cmp-Att-Int	Pct	Yds	TD	Lng	Avg/G
Pat White	7–7	99–142–3	69.7	885	13	44	126.4
Jarrett Brown	5–1	22–30–1	73.3	114	1	25	22.8
Total							
Opponents							

==== Receiving ====
Name	GP-GS	Rec.	Yds	Avg	TD	Long	Avg/G
Jock Sanders	8–8	35	263	7.5	6	25	32.9
Alric Arnett	8–8	19	226	11.9	3	44	28.3
Dorrell Jalloh	8–8	17	202	11.9	3	35	25.3
Noel Devine	8–8	22	96	4.4	0	17	12
Wes Lyons	4–0	9	90	10	0	19	22.5
Will Johnson	4–2	7	48	6.9	1	12	12
Tito Gonzales	3–0	4	35	8.8	0	11	11.6
Tyler Urban	2–0	1	25	25	2	25	12.5
Bradley Starks	3–0	4	20	5	0	13	6.6
Total							
Opponents							

=== Defense ===
Name	GP	Tackles				Sacks	Pass Def.	Interceptions			Fumbles		Blkd Kick
Name	GP	Solo	Ast	Total	TFL-Yds	No-Yds	BU	No.-Yds	Avg	TD	Rcv-Yds	FF	No.
Mortty Ivy	8	24	37	61	4.0 – 10	.5 – 3	2	3–48	16	0	1–30	0	0
Quinton Andrews	8	28	26	54	2.0 – 4	0	5	0	0	0	0	0	0
Sidney Glover	8	23	22	45	4.5 – 18	1.0 – 7	2	0	0	0	0	0	0
Ellis Lankster	8	27	17	44	1.5 – 11	0	4	1–31	31	0	0	0	0
Anthony Leonard	8	12	31	43	1.5 – 4	.5 – 3	1	0	0	0	0	1	0
J.T. Thomas	8	12	25	37	3.5 – 24	1.5 – 15	3	0	0	0	0	2	1
Chris Neild	8	9	23	32	2.5 – 6	1.5 – 4	0	0	0	0	0	1	0
Brandon Hogan	8	15	13	28	0	0	3	2–50	25	0	2–0	0	0
Franchot "Boogie" Allen	8	13	13	26	2.5 – 4	1.0 – 2	0	0	0	0	0	0	0
Eain Smith	8	10	15	25	0	0	0	0	0	0	0	0	0
John Holmes	8	7	13	20	3.5 – 25	3.0 – 24	1	1	0	0	0	2	0
Robert Sands	8	8	11	19	0	0	0	0	0	0	0	0	0
Doug Slavonic	8	3	15	18	2.5 – 9	2.5 – 9	1	0	0	0	1–0	1	0
Ovid Goldbourne	8	5	12	17	.5 – 3	.5 – 3	0	0	0	0	0	0	0
Reed Williams	4	6	11	17	2.0 – 4	0	1	1–11	11	0	0	0	0
Pat Lazear	8	4	11	15	1.0 – 3	0	0	0	0	0	0	0	0
Kent Richardson	8	8	5	13	1.0 – 1	0	1	0	0	0	0	0	0
Nate Sowers	7	7	6	13	.5 – 1	0	1	1–0	0	0	0	0	0
Pat Liebig	5	1	10	11	0	0	0	0	0	0	0	0	0
Guesly Dervil	7	4	5	9	0	0	0	0	0	0	0	0	0
Zac Cooper	8	3	5	8	1.0 – 8	1.0 – 8	0	0	0	0	0	0	0
Total													

=== Special teams ===
Name	Kicking								Punting				
Name	XPM	XPA	XP%	FGM	FGA	FG%	LG	No.	Yds	Avg.	TB	-20	LG
Pat McAfee	25	25	100	9	10	90	52	37	1643	44.4	5	18	65
Total													

Name	Punt returns					Kick returns				
Name	No.	Yds	Avg	TD	Long	No.	Yds	Avg	TD	Long
Ellis Lankster	20	171	8.6	0	36	3	67	22.3	0	31
Brandon Hogan	2	17	8.5	11	0					
Mark Rodgers						13	301	23.2	0	44
Jock Sanders	1	0	0	0	0	5	108	21.6	0	32
Total										
