= Ed Pastilong =

American football player, coach, and college athletics administrator

Biographical details
- Born: 1943 (age 82–83); Moundsville, West Virginia, U.S.

Playing career
- 1963–1965: West Virginia
- Position: Quarterback

Coaching career (HC unless noted)
- 1970–1974: Salem
- 1976–1978: West Virginia (RC)

Administrative career (AD unless noted)
- 1979–1987: West Virginia (assistant AD)
- 1987–1989: West Virginia (assoc. AD)
- 1989–2010: West Virginia

Head coaching record
- Overall: 31–14–2

Edward Pastilong (born 1943) is an American former football player, coach, and college athletics administrator. He served as the athletic director at West Virginia University from 1989 to 2010.

== Early life ==
Pastilong was born in Moundsville, West Virginia. He played football as a quarterback at West Virginia University from 1963 to 1965. In those three seasons, Pastilong threw for 728 yards, six touchdowns, and eight interceptions. In 1966, Pastilong received his bachelor's degree from WVU West Virginia physical education and earned a master's degree soon after.

Pastilong then moved on to coach football at Scott High in Madison, West Virginia and then at Salem College from 1970 to 1974. During his football tenure at Salem, his team won more games than any other West Virginia Intercollegiate Athletic Conference team during that period. He was also the school's dean of health and physical education from 1972 to 1975.

== West Virginia University ==
=== 1976–1987 ===
In 1976, Pastilong joined the university as a football recruiting coordinator, and in 1978 he became the scholarship officer.

In 1979, Pastilong was named the assistant athletic director at West Virginia University, his alma mater. Pastilong was important in the building of Mountaineer Field and the maintenance of the WVU Coliseum. Pastilong was also key in the arrival of new head coach, Don Nehlen, from Michigan.

=== 1987–2010 ===
In 1987, Pastilong was promoted to associate athletic director. West Virginia gained a full membership in the Big East in 1995.

During his tenure at West Virginia, Pastilong has overseen the construction of an indoor practice facility for football, stadium luxury boxes, a gymnastics performance center, new soccer fields, an outdoor track surface, lights for the baseball stadium, and new tennis courts. An athletic scholarship endowment fund was established in 1991, and has grown to over 125 endowed scholarships.

Pastilong also established the Athletic Director's Academic Honor Roll for WVU, which recognized the student-athletes who succeed in the classroom as well as the playing field. Academic student support centers were constructed at the Milan Puskar Center and the WVU Coliseum. The centers were complete with study rooms, computer terminals, and even tutors. A program was even established to help athletes with "college life" and life after college. An educational consortium was also established to help former athletes return to school to finish their degrees as well.

Pastilong was also key in the creation of the WVU Sports Hall of Fame and the Red Brown Cup and Fred Schaus Captain's Award to honor the student-athlete of the year.

Pastilong oversaw 17 varsity sports programs, over 500 student-athletes, and an annual budget that exceeds $25 million.

After Don Nehlen retired followed the 2000 football season, former Glenville State College head coach Rich Rodriguez took over the head coaching position in 2001. Rodriguez eventually led the Mountaineers football team to three-consecutive 10-win seasons (unmatched in school history), the highest poll positions in school history (#2 in the BCS poll, #1 in the Coaches' poll), the first consecutive Top 10 finishes in school history, and the school's first ever BCS bowl victory.

Rodriguez, however, left West Virginia to take over the head coaching position at the University of Michigan on December 16, 2007. Controversy arose over Rodriguez' $4 million buyout, a report of Rodriguez shredding football documents before his departure, and reports that Rodriguez called recruits and told of his departure to them before the team and university. However, interim head coach and former quarterbacks coach, Bill Stewart, led the Mountaineers to a 48–28 upset over the University of Oklahoma in the Fiesta Bowl. Stewart was then named the Mountaineer's 32nd football head coach.

However, on February 21, 2008, Pastilong announced he would be retiring in 2010. He will stay with the school until 2012. The West Virginia University athletic program held the honor of being the only school in the nation in 2007 to win a BCS game, an NCAA men's basketball tournament game, and an NCAA women's basketball tournament game.

== Head coaching record ==
Year	Team	Overall	Conference	Standing	Bowl/playoffs	NAIA^{#}
Salem Tigers (West Virginia Intercollegiate Athletic Conference) (1970–1974)
1970	Salem	5–3–1	5–3–1	3rd		
1971	Salem	7–2–1	6–2–1	3rd		
1972	Salem	6–3	6–3	4th		
1973	Salem	6–4	2–2	3rd (Northern)		
1974	Salem	7–2	3–1	2nd (Northern)		15
Salem:		31–14–2	22–11–2			
Total:		31–14–2				
^{#}Rankings from final NAIA Division I poll.
