= 2008 Connecticut Huskies football team =

American college football season

2008 Connecticut Huskies football
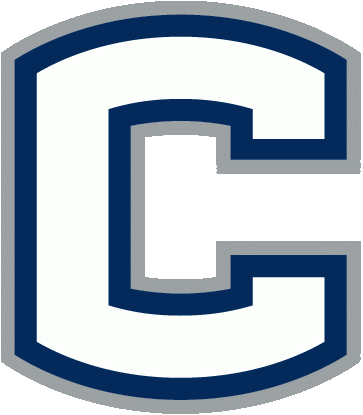

International Bowl champion

International Bowl, W 38–20 vs. Buffalo
- Conference: Big East Conference
- Record: 8–5 (3–4 Big East)
- Head coach: Randy Edsall (10th season)
- Offensive coordinator: Rob Ambrose (3rd season)
- Offensive scheme: Multiple
- Defensive coordinator: Todd Orlando (4th season)
- Base defense: 3–4
- Home stadium: Rentschler Field

2008 Big East Conference football standings
| | Conf. | | | Overall |
| Team | W | | L | W | | L |
|---|---|---|---|---|---|---|
| No. 17 Cincinnati $ | 6 | – | 1 | 11 | – | 3 |
| Pittsburgh | 5 | – | 2 | 9 | – | 4 |
| No. 23 West Virginia | 5 | – | 2 | 9 | – | 4 |
| Rutgers | 5 | – | 2 | 8 | – | 5 |
| Connecticut | 3 | – | 4 | 8 | – | 5 |
| South Florida | 2 | – | 5 | 8 | – | 5 |
| Louisville | 1 | – | 6 | 5 | – | 7 |
| Syracuse | 1 | – | 6 | 3 | – | 9 |
$ – BCS representative as conference champion; Rankings from AP Poll

The 2008 Connecticut Huskies football team represented the University of Connecticut as a member of the Big East Conference during the 2008 NCAA Division I FBS football season. Led by tenth-year head coach Randy Edsall, the Huskies compiled an overall record of 8–5 with a mark of 3–4 in conference play, placing fifth in the Big East. Connecticut was invited to the International Bowl, where the Huskies defeated Buffalo. The team played home games at Rentschler Field in East Hartford, Connecticut.

== Schedule ==
| Date | Time | Opponent | Rank | Site | TV | Result | Attendance |
|---|---|---|---|---|---|---|---|
| August 28 | 7:00 pm | Hofstra* | | Rentschler Field; East Hartford, CT | ESPN Plus | W 35-3 | 37,583 |
| September 6 | 12:00 pm | at Temple* | | Lincoln Financial Field; Philadelphia, PA | ESPNU | W 12–9 ^{OT} | 17,194 |
| September 13 | 7:30 pm | Virginia* | | Rentschler Field; East Hartford, CT | ESPNU | W 45–10 | 40,000 |
| September 19 | 8:00 pm | Baylor* | | Rentschler Field; East Hartford, CT | ESPN2 | W 31–28 | 38,870 |
| September 26 | 8:00 pm | at Louisville | | Papa John's Cardinal Stadium; Louisville, KY | ESPN2 | W 26–21 | 42,523 |
| October 4 | 7:00 pm | at North Carolina* | No. 24 | Kenan Memorial Stadium; Chapel Hill, NC | ESPN2 | L 38–12 | 59,500 |
| October 18 | 12:00 pm | at Rutgers | | Rutgers Stadium; Piscataway, NJ | ESPNU | L 12–10 | 42,491 |
| October 25 | 12:00 pm | Cincinnati^{†} | | Rentschler Field; East Hartford, CT | BEN | W 40–16 | 40,000 |
| November 1 | 12:00 pm | West Virginia | | Rentschler Field; East Hartford, CT | BEN | L 35–13 | 40,000 |
| November 15 | 7:00 pm | at Syracuse | | Carrier Dome; Syracuse, NY (rivalry) | ESPNU | W 39–14 | 28,081 |
| November 23 | 8:00 pm | at South Florida | | Raymond James Stadium; Tampa, FL | ESPN | L 17–13 | 42,422 |
| December 6 | 12:00 pm | No. 23 Pittsburgh | | Rentschler Field; East Hartford, CT | ESPN | L 34–10 | 39,535 |
| January 3 | 12:00 pm | vs. Buffalo* | | Rogers Centre; Toronto, ON (International Bowl) | ESPN | W 38–20 | 40,184 |
*Non-conference game; ^{†}Homecoming; Rankings from AP Poll released prior to the game; All times are in Eastern time

== Rankings ==
Ranking movements Legend: ██ Increase in ranking ██ Decrease in ranking — = Not ranked
| | Week | | | | | | | | | | | | | | | |
| Poll | Pre | 1 | 2 | 3 | 4 | 5 | 6 | 7 | 8 | 9 | 10 | 11 | 12 | 13 | 14 | Final |
|---|---|---|---|---|---|---|---|---|---|---|---|---|---|---|---|---|
| AP | — | — | — | — | — | 24 | — | — | — | — | — | — | — | — | — | — |
| Coaches | — | — | — | — | — | 23 | — | — | — | — | — | — | — | — | — | |
| Harris | Not released | | | | | 24 | — | — | — | — | — | — | — | — | — | Not released |
| BCS | Not released | | | | | | | | — | 25 | — | — | — | — | — | Not released |

== Game summaries ==
=== Hofstra ===
| | 1 | 2 | 3 | 4 | Total |
|---|---|---|---|---|---|
| Hofstra | 0 | 0 | 3 | 0 | 3 |
| Connecticut | 14 | 14 | 0 | 7 | 35 |

Making their 2008 season debut, the Huskies came out strong scoring 14 points in each of the first two quarters en route to a 35–3 victory against FCS opponent Hofstra. In the game, Donald Brown rushed for 150 yards and four touchdowns before giving way to Robbie Frey who added a score of his own. UConn also extended their home winning streak to 8 games extending back to last season.

=== Temple ===
| | 1 | 2 | 3 | 4 | OT | Total |
|---|---|---|---|---|---|---|
| Connecticut | 0 | 0 | 0 | 6 | 6 | 12 |
| Temple | 3 | 3 | 0 | 0 | 3 | 9 |

As UConn took the show on the road, conditions were less than ideal as Hurricane Hanna (in a weakened state) made her presence felt in Philadelphia. The game which was billed by Temple as UConn/Temple II didn't really live up to the hype of the controversial game last year. In a game which was largely played within the 20s, Donald Brown rushed for a career-high 214 yards, and the game-winning touchdown in overtime. Place kicker Tony Ciaravino added two field goals to give UConn their twelve-point total for the day.

=== Virginia ===
| | 1 | 2 | 3 | 4 | Total |
|---|---|---|---|---|---|
| Virginia | 0 | 0 | 3 | 7 | 10 |
| Connecticut | 7 | 21 | 14 | 3 | 45 |

Junior tailback Donald Brown rushed for over 200 yards for the second consecutive week and senior quarterback Tyler Lorenzen had a terrific game running the Connecticut offense as the Huskies manhandled Virginia, 45–10, in a non-conference football game played before a sellout crowd of 40,000 at Rentschler Field.

=== Baylor ===
| | 1 | 2 | 3 | 4 | Total |
|---|---|---|---|---|---|
| Baylor | 7 | 7 | 7 | 7 | 28 |
| Connecticut | 0 | 14 | 10 | 7 | 31 |

Junior tailback Donald Brown scored on a three-yard run with 6:04 remaining in the fourth quarter and the Connecticut defense held Baylor on fourth down with less than a minute to play as the Huskies hung on to defeat the Bears, 31–28, before a crowd of 38,870 at Rentschler Field.

=== Louisville ===
| | 1 | 2 | 3 | 4 | Total |
|---|---|---|---|---|---|
| Connecticut | 3 | 7 | 7 | 9 | 26 |
| Louisville | 0 | 14 | 7 | 0 | 21 |

The Huskies took the show on the road to start a very long, and potentially very rewarding three game road trip. The defense for UConn was less than stellar allowing 508 yards of offense, almost double their own output. The shining light for the Huskies was Donald Brown, who rushed for 190 yards and a touchdown. When he was given the ball, he made things happen time and time again. The injury bug also hit the Huskies and hit them hard. Starting quarterback Tyler Lorenzen suffered a broken foot early in the second quarter paving the way for Notre Dame transfer Zach Frazier to take over the helm. Later in the third quarter, senior tight end Steve Brouse suffered a broken fibula. Despite the injuries to two of their senior offensive leaders, the Huskies rallied late behind Frazier and two way player Darius Butler. Trailing by one point with 2:45 left in the game, Linebacker Lawrence Wilson picked off Cardinal's quarterback Hunter Cantwell and went 45 yards the other way to put UConn up 26–21, with the two-point conversion being unsuccessful. The UConn defense held strong on the ensuing possession, sealing the victory, and the Huskies second consecutive 5–0 start.

== International Bowl ==
The Huskies had a great season and were invited to their third bowl game in school history for the second straight year. On January 3, 2009, they played the University of Buffalo Bulls in the International Bowl in Toronto, Ontario, Canada. The Huskies started off committing sloppy turnovers in the first half but would go on to win the game 38–20. Steve Brouse caught the only touchdown pass of the game while running back Donald Brown rushed for 261 yards on 29 carries and one touchdown. He was named the MVP of the game and after the game he decided to forgo his senior season to enter the 2009 NFL draft.

== Roster ==
UConn Huskies Roster
| Quarterbacks: 12 Cody Endres; 10 Zach Frazer; 4 Tyler Lorenzen; Running backs: 34 Donald Brown; 2 Andre Dixon; 44 Robbie Frey; 23 Jordan Todman; 49 Anthony Sherman FB; Wide receivers: 87 Ellis Gaulden; 82 Kashif Moore; 14 D.J. Hernandez; 3 Brad Kanuch; 1 Darius Butler; 19 Erik Muschette; 29 Marcus Easley; 85 Kevin Poles; Tight ends: 90 Steve Brouse; 91 Martin Bédard; 84 Yianni Apostolakos | Offensive linemen: 64 Will Beatty LT; 73 Dan Ryan LT; 57 Moe Petrus LG; 69 Trey Tonsing LG; 68 Keith Gray C; 70 Gary Bardzak C; 78 Zach Hurd RG; 66 Matheiu Oliver RG; 79 Mike Hicks RT; 72 Mike Ryan RT; Defensive linemen: 45 Julius Williams DE; 9 Lindsey Witten DE; 65 Rob Lunn DT; 4 Twyon Martin DT; 54 Alex Polito DT; 99 Kendall Reyes DT; 50 Cody Brown DE; 26 Marcus Campbell DE; Linebackers: 32 Scott Lutrus Husky LB; 10 Greg Robinson Husky LB; 19 Kijuan Dabney Husky LB; 95 Greg Lloyd Jr. MLB; 31 C.J. Marck MLB; 8 Lawrence Wilson WLB; 18 Aaron Bryant WLB | Defensive backs: 1 Darius Butler CB; 20 Terry Baltimore CB; 33 Robert Vaughn S; 27 Aaron Bagsby S; 36 Dahna Deleston S; 7 Glen Mourning S; 6 Jasper Howard CB; 42 Robert McClain CB; Special teams: 97 Tony Ciaravino K; 38 David Teggart K; 13 Desi Cullen P |

== Team awards ==
The 2008 Connecticut Huskies post season team awards were handed out during their annual team banquet. The award winners were:

- Most Valuable Player: Donald Brown
- Offensive Player of the Year: Donald Brown
- Defensive Player of the Year: Cody Brown
- Special Teams Player of the Year: Robbie Frey
- Joseph M. Giannelli Unsung Hero Award: Will Beatty and Dahna Deleston
- John L. Toner Scholar Athlete Award: Keith Gray
- Football Alumni Award: Tyler Lorenzen and Steve Brouse
- Kendall Madison Award: Darius Butler
- Brian Kozlowski Award: Julius Williams

== Pro drafts ==
Four players on the 2008 UConn football team were selected in the 2009 NFL draft on April 25, 2009. Donald Brown was selected in the first round at No. 27 by the Indianapolis Colts. There Huskies were taken in the second round: Darius Butler at No. 41 by the New England Patriots, Will Beatty at No. 60 by the New York Giants, and Cody Brown at No. 63 by the Arizona Cardinals. After the draft, four other Huskies signed free agent contracts with NFL teams: Julius Williams (Jacksonville Jaguars), Dahna Deleston (Chicago Bears), Tyler Lorenzen (Jacksonville Jaguars), and Keith Gray (Carolina Panthers).

On May 2, 2009, Martin Bédard was taken in the second round of the 2009 CFL draft by the Montreal Alouettes.
