= 2008 Pittsburgh Panthers football team =

American college football season

2008 Pittsburgh Panthers football

Sun Bowl, L 0–3 vs. Oregon State
- Conference: Big East Conference
- Record: 9–4 (5–2 Big East)
- Head coach: Dave Wannstedt (4th season)
- Offensive coordinator: Matt Cavanaugh (4th season)
- Offensive scheme: Pro-style
- Defensive coordinator: Phil Bennett (1st season)
- Base defense: 4–3
- Home stadium: Heinz Field

2008 Big East Conference football standings
| | Conf. | | | Overall |
| Team | W | | L | W | | L |
|---|---|---|---|---|---|---|
| No. 17 Cincinnati $ | 6 | – | 1 | 11 | – | 3 |
| Pittsburgh | 5 | – | 2 | 9 | – | 4 |
| No. 23 West Virginia | 5 | – | 2 | 9 | – | 4 |
| Rutgers | 5 | – | 2 | 8 | – | 5 |
| Connecticut | 3 | – | 4 | 8 | – | 5 |
| South Florida | 2 | – | 5 | 8 | – | 5 |
| Louisville | 1 | – | 6 | 5 | – | 7 |
| Syracuse | 1 | – | 6 | 3 | – | 9 |
$ – BCS representative as conference champion; Rankings from AP Poll

The 2008 Pittsburgh Panthers football team represented the University of Pittsburgh in the 2008 NCAA Division I FBS football season. The season was the fourth under head coach Dave Wannstedt. The 2008 season marked the team's eighth at Heinz Field and the program's 119th season.

The Panthers started the 2008 season with new defensive coordinator Phil Bennett. Ranked in the top 25 for the second time under Wannstedt's leadership, Pitt suffered an early and surprising setback in the opening game against Bowling Green. Pitt rebounded to defeat Buffalo and then Iowa by a score of 21–20. The winning continued when the Panthers upset undefeated and tenth ranked South Florida in a game nationally televised by ESPN. A win at Navy preceded a home upset to Rutgers, Pitt's fourth consecutive loss to the Scarlet Knights. However, Pitt rebounded the following week at Notre Dame with a 36–33 four-overtime victory over the Irish, the longest game ever for both Notre Dame and Pittsburgh. After a 41–7 rout of visiting Louisville, the Panthers improved to 7–2, were bowl-bound for the first time under Wannstedt, and were in contention for a Big East Championship and a BCS bowl bid. However, a loss at Cincinnati in the River City Rivalry eliminated the Panthers from championship contention. Pitt rallied to defeat archrival West Virginia 19–15 on the Friday after Thanksgiving in a nationally televised game on ABC for its second consecutive win in the Backyard Brawl. The following week the Panthers won at UConn to improve to 9–3 and clinched a bid to the Sun Bowl, the first bowl bid under Wannstedt. Pitt lost 3–0 to Oregon State, a team that had previously defeated USC. It was the first time Pitt was held scoreless in twelve years.

== Schedule ==
| Date | Time | Opponent | Rank | Site | TV | Result | Attendance |
|---|---|---|---|---|---|---|---|
| August 30 | 12:00 p.m. | Bowling Green* | No. 25 | Heinz Field; Pittsburgh, PA | ESPNU | L 17–27 | 45,063 |
| September 6 | 6:00 p.m. | Buffalo* | | Heinz Field; Pittsburgh, PA | ESPN GamePlan | W 27–16 | 42,494 |
| September 20 | 12:00 p.m. | Iowa* | | Heinz Field; Pittsburgh, PA | ESPN2 | W 21–20 | 50,321 |
| September 27 | 12:00 p.m. | at Syracuse | | Carrier Dome; Syracuse, NY (rivalry) | ESPN Plus | W 34–24 | 27,549 |
| October 2 | 7:30 p.m. | at No. 10 South Florida | | Raymond James Stadium; Tampa, FL | ESPN | W 26–21 | 50,307 |
| October 18 | 3:30 p.m. | at Navy* | No. 23 | Navy–Marine Corps Memorial Stadium; Annapolis, MD | CBSCS | W 42–21 | 37,970 |
| October 25 | 3:30 p.m. | Rutgers^{†} | No. 17 | Heinz Field; Pittsburgh, PA | ESPN360 | L 34–54 | 51,161 |
| November 1 | 2:30 p.m. | at Notre Dame* | | Notre Dame Stadium; Notre Dame, IN (rivalry) | NBC | W 36–33 ^{4OT} | 80,795 |
| November 8 | 12:00 p.m. | Louisville | No. 25 | Heinz Field; Pittsburgh, PA | ESPN Plus | W 41–7 | 44,055 |
| November 22 | 7:15 p.m. | at No. 19 Cincinnati | No. 20 | Nippert Stadium; Cincinnati, OH | ESPN2 | L 21–28 | 35,098 |
| November 28 | 12:00 p.m. | West Virginia | | Heinz Field; Pittsburgh, PA (Backyard Brawl) | ABC | W 19–15 | 63,019 |
| December 6 | 12:00 p.m. | at Connecticut | No. 23 | Rentschler Field; East Hartford, CT | ESPN | W 34–10 | 39,535 |
| December 31 | 2:00 p.m. | vs. No. 24 Oregon State* | No. 18 | Sun Bowl; El Paso, TX (Sun Bowl) | CBS | L 0–3 | 49,037 |
*Non-conference game; ^{†}Homecoming; Rankings from AP Poll released prior to the game; All times are in Eastern time

== Rankings ==
Pitt began the season ranked at No. 25 in the AP poll. It was the Panthers first appearance in any major polling service since 2005 and first preseason ranking since 2003.

Ranking movements Legend: ██ Increase in ranking ██ Decrease in ranking — = Not ranked RV = Received votes
| | Week | | | | | | | | | | | | | | | | |
| Poll | Pre | 1 | 2 | 3 | 4 | 5 | 6 | 7 | 8 | 9 | 10 | 11 | 12 | 13 | 14 | 15 | Final |
|---|---|---|---|---|---|---|---|---|---|---|---|---|---|---|---|---|---|
| AP | 25 | — | — | — | — | — | 24 | 23 | 17 | RV | 25 | 21 | 20 | RV | 23 | 18 | RV |
| Coaches | RV | — | — | — | — | — | RV | RV | 20 | RV | RV | 21 | 19 | RV | 23 | 21 | RV |
| Harris | Not released | | | | | — | RV | 25 | 18 | RV | RV | 21 | 19 | 25 | 23 | 19 | Not released |
| BCS | Not released | | | | | | | | 17 | — | — | 21 | 20 | 25 | 23 | 20 | Not released |

== Preseason ==
=== Recruits ===
Head coach Dave Wannstedt signed the top recruiting class in the Big East Conference, his third consecutive top-25 recruiting class, to kick off the 2008 football year. Although Wannstedt had been recruiting well since the beginning of his tenure at Pitt, some of that 2008 recruiting power was attributed to the Panthers' season finale win over West Virginia. The highlights of the class were projected to be WR Jon Baldwin, RB Chris Burns, OT Lucas Nix, LB Shayne Hale, and athlete Cameron Saddler.

College recruiting (2008)
| Name | Hometown | School | Height | Weight | 40^{‡} | Commit date |
|---|---|---|---|---|---|---|
| Johnathan Baldwin; WR | Aliquippa, PA | Aliquippa SHS | 6 ft 6 in (1.98 m) | 233 lb (106 kg) | 4.40 | Dec 10, 2007 |
| Johnathan Baldwin; WR | Recruit ratings: Scout: Rivals: (83) | | | | | |
| Chris Burns; RB | New Wilmington, PA | Wilmnington Area HS | 5 ft 10 in (1.78 m) | 185 lb (84 kg) | 4.44 | Apr 2, 2007 |
| Chris Burns; RB | Recruit ratings: Scout: Rivals: (81) | | | | | |
| Greg Cross; QB | Fort Scott, KS | Fort Scott CC | 6 ft 2 in (1.88 m) | 205 lb (93 kg) | 4.55 | Dec 9, 2007 |
| Greg Cross; QB | Recruit ratings: Scout: Rivals: (n/a) | | | | | |
| Mike Cruz; TE | Johnstown, PA | Bishop McCort HS | 6 ft 4 in (1.93 m) | 245 lb (111 kg) | 4.85 | Jan 4, 2008 |
| Mike Cruz; TE | Recruit ratings: Scout: Rivals: (78) | | | | | |
| Shayne Hale; LB | Monroeville, PA | Gateway SHS | 6 ft 3 in (1.91 m) | 235 lb (107 kg) | 4.6 | Jan 5, 2008 |
| Shayne Hale; LB | Recruit ratings: Scout: Rivals: (81) | | | | | |
| Kevin Harper; K | Mentor, OH | Mentor HS | 6 ft 0 in (1.83 m) | 185 lb (84 kg) | n/a | Oct 29, 2007 |
| Kevin Harper; K | Recruit ratings: Scout: Rivals: (40) | | | | | |
| Ronald Hobby; WR | Brandywine, MD | Gwynn Park HS | 5 ft 10 in (1.78 m) | 170 lb (77 kg) | 4.45 | Jul 27, 2007 |
| Ronald Hobby; WR | Recruit ratings: Scout: Rivals: (67) | | | | | |
| Jarred Holley; DB | Easton, PA | Easton Area HS | 5 ft 9 in (1.75 m) | 170 lb (77 kg) | 4.50 | Jan 16, 2008 |
| Jarred Holley; DB | Recruit ratings: Scout: Rivals: (65) | | | | | |
| Robb Houser; OL | Oroville, CA | Butte College | 6 ft 3 in (1.91 m) | 285 lb (129 kg) | n/a | Dec 15, 2007 |
| Robb Houser; OL | Recruit ratings: Scout: Rivals: (n/a) | | | | | |
| Lucas Nix; OL | Clairton, PA | Thomas Jefferson HS | 6 ft 6 in (1.98 m) | 295 lb (134 kg) | 5.5 | Jun 22, 2007 |
| Lucas Nix; OL | Recruit ratings: Scout: Rivals: (81) | | | | | |
| Antwuan Reed; DB | Johnstown, PA | Greater Johnstown SHS | 5 ft 9 in (1.75 m) | 175 lb (79 kg) | 4.40 | Nov 26, 2006 |
| Antwuan Reed; DB | Recruit ratings: Scout: Rivals: (74) | | | | | |
| Cameron Saddler; RB | Monroeville, PA | Gateway SHS | 5 ft 6 in (1.68 m) | 160 lb (73 kg) | 4.40 | Dec 5, 2007 |
| Cameron Saddler; RB | Recruit ratings: Scout: Rivals: (78) | | | | | |
| Mike Shanahan; WR | North Huntingdon Township, PA | Norwin SHS | 6 ft 4 in (1.93 m) | 195 lb (88 kg) | 4.65 | Dec 9, 2007 |
| Mike Shanahan; WR | Recruit ratings: Scout: Rivals: (76) | | | | | |
| Tino Sunseri; QB | Pittsburgh, PA | Central Catholic HS | 6 ft 2 in (1.88 m) | 200 lb (91 kg) | 4.60 | Dec 10, 2007 |
| Tino Sunseri; QB | Recruit ratings: Scout: Rivals: (80) | | | | | |
| Andrew Taglianetti; ATH | Pittsburgh, PA | Central Catholic HS | 5 ft 10 in (1.78 m) | 175 lb (79 kg) | 4.50 | Jan 28, 2008 |
| Andrew Taglianetti; ATH | Recruit ratings: Scout: Rivals: (40) | | | | | |
| Joe Trebitz; LB | Boca Raton, FL | West Boca Raton HS | 6 ft 3 in (1.91 m) | 200 lb (91 kg) | 4.75 | Jan 14, 2008 |
| Joe Trebitz; LB | Recruit ratings: Scout: Rivals: (72) | | | | | |
| Ryan Turnley; OL | Aliquippa, PA | Hopewell SHS | 6 ft 6 in (1.98 m) | 300 lb (140 kg) | n/a | Jun 24, 2007 |
| Ryan Turnley; OL | Recruit ratings: Scout: Rivals: (75) | | | | | |
| Justin Virbitsky; TE | Jermyn, PA | Lakeland JSHS | 6 ft 5 in (1.96 m) | 250 lb (110 kg) | 5.0 | Jan 13, 2008 |
| Justin Virbitsky; TE | Recruit ratings: Scout: Rivals: (76) | | | | | |
| Manny Williams; LB | Clairton, PA | Clairton HS | 6 ft 1 in (1.85 m) | 205 lb (93 kg) | 4.55 | Jun 18, 2007 |
| Manny Williams; LB | Recruit ratings: Scout: Rivals: (75) | | | | | |
Overall recruit ranking: Scout: 25 Rivals: 28
‡ Refers to 40-yard dash; Note: In many cases, Scout, Rivals, 247Sports, On3, and ESPN may conflict in their listings of height, weight and 40 time.; In these cases, the average was taken. ESPN grades are on a 100-point scale.; Sources: "Scout.com Football Recruiting: Pittsburgh". Scout.; "RecruitTracker 2008: Pittsburgh". ESPN.; "Scout.com Team Recruiting Rankings". Scout.; "2008 Team Ranking". Rivals.com.

=== Spring practices ===
Throughout spring practices the defense dominated the offense, but in the annual Blue-Gold Game on April 19 at Heinz Field, the offense got the better of the defense, winning 60-25 under a modified scoring system that favored the offense. The rising stars of the spring practices were defensive tackle Mick Williams, wide receiver Cedric McGee, and newly converted tight end Dorin Dickerson, who all earned the Ed Conway Award given to Pitt's most improved players at spring practices. Other important spring performances included Bill Stull, who re-established himself as the team's top quarterback, and John Malecki, a two-time letterman on defense at nose tackle who earned a starting spot on the offensive line at guard. The Blue-Gold Game was simulcast live locally in Pittsburgh on WPCW and nationally on the NFL Network.

=== Award watchlists ===
Several players on the Panthers were nominated to various award preseason watchlists.

Walter Camp Award:

- LeSean McCoy, RB, sophomore
- Scott McKillop, LB, senior

Outland Trophy:

- Gus Mustakas, DT, senior

John Mackey Award:

- Nate Byham, junior

Bronko Nagurski Trophy:

- Scott McKillop, LB, senior

Lombardi Award:

- Scott McKillop, LB, senior

Dick Butkus Award:

- Scott McKillop, LB, senior

Maxwell Award:

- Derek Kinder, WR, senior
- LeSean McCoy, RB, sophomore

Chuck Bednarik Award:

- Scott McKillop, LB, senior

== Game summaries ==
=== Bowling Green ===
| | 1 | 2 | 3 | 4 | Total |
|---|---|---|---|---|---|
| Falcons | 0 | 14 | 6 | 7 | 27 |
| No. 25 Panthers | 7 | 10 | 0 | 0 | 17 |

The Panthers entered the season in the preseason rankings for the first time since 2005, but their stay did not last long, as they were upset at home by the Falcons. The Panthers, who outgained the Falcons 393–254 on the day, jumped out to an early 14–0 lead in the first half as they outgained Bowling Green 137–6 in the first quarter. After falling behind early the Falcons rallied and took advantage of four costly Pitt turnovers. The Falcons keyed on Panther tailback LeSean McCoy, who fumbled once and was held to 71 yards on 23 carries. The Panthers defense was repeatedly befuddled by some of the odd formations that the Falcons used on offense, such utilizing an imbalanced offensive line or lining up a wide receiver at the quarterback position. However, the following year, defensive coordinator Phil Bennett praised head coach Dave Wannstedt for the way he handled the defeat, saying, "I told many people this: I've seen a lot of head coaches where the whole thing would have toppled after a game like that. I thought the way he handled it – his demeanor not just with the players but with the coaches – was phenomenal." (Game report)

=== Buffalo ===
| | 1 | 2 | 3 | 4 | Total |
|---|---|---|---|---|---|
| Bulls | 6 | 3 | 7 | 0 | 16 |
| Panthers | 0 | 10 | 7 | 10 | 27 |

The Panthers, facing a MAC foe for the second straight game, withstood an early charge by the Bulls, taking the lead in the 2nd quarter and holding off Buffalo every time they made a move. LeSean McCoy scored all three touchdowns for the Panthers, scoring on runs of three, one, and two yards. (Game report)

=== Iowa ===
| | 1 | 2 | 3 | 4 | Total |
|---|---|---|---|---|---|
| Hawkeyes | 3 | 7 | 7 | 3 | 20 |
| Panthers | 7 | 7 | 0 | 7 | 21 |

Pitt went into the Iowa game looking to make a positive statement for themselves against a quality program as well as wipe away some of the stigma attached to themselves due to their earlier loss to Bowling Green. The game was billed as a showdown of two top running backs, Pitt's LeSean McCoy and Iowa's Shonn Greene. Pitt men's basketball coach Jamie Dixon provided a motivational speech for the football team two days before the game against the Hawkeyes in which he described a potential win over Iowa as a "program-building" victory that could help put the Panthers back onto the national radar, propelling them to new heights of success. The Panthers jumped out to an early 14–3 lead when two Pitt quarterbacks, Bill Stull and Gregg Cross, each ran a called draw in for a touchdown in the first half. Greg Cross, an athletic, change-of-pace, junior college transfer quarterback, made his Panthers debut, scoring a touchdown on a 17-yard scramble in his first play as a Panther. The Panthers offense struggled greatly after taking the lead in the second quarter. However, Pitt's defensive line dominated Iowa's offensive line in the fourth quarter as the well-conditioned yet undersized Panthers outlasted the Hawkeyes. The Panthers' depth on the defensive line also played a role as they were able to rotate nine defensive linemen throughout the game. Coach Wannstedt and his staff were noticeably more aggressive in their play-calling; all three Panthers touchdowns resulted from an offensive drive that included a fourth-down conversion. Although the victory was a big one for the team, the offense still showed great inconsistency and need for improvement. Punter Dave Brytus and linkbacker Scott McKillop were named the Big East Player of the Week for special teams and defense, respectively, following their performances against Iowa. Brytus punted eight times for an average of 47.8 yards, including a longest of sixty yards, one touchback, and one downed inside the twenty. McKillop, who broke his nose on a tackle of Shonn Greene when his nose was crushed by his own facemask, finished with ten tackles, including six solo tackles, two and a half tackles for a loss of nine yards, and one sack. (Game report)

=== Syracuse ===
| | 1 | 2 | 3 | 4 | Total |
|---|---|---|---|---|---|
| Panthers | 3 | 10 | 3 | 18 | 34 |
| Orange | 14 | 3 | 7 | 0 | 24 |

(Game report)

=== USF ===
| | 1 | 2 | 3 | 4 | Total |
|---|---|---|---|---|---|
| Panthers | 7 | 10 | 0 | 9 | 26 |
| No. 10 Bulls | 7 | 0 | 7 | 7 | 21 |

(Game report)

=== Navy ===
| | 1 | 2 | 3 | 4 | Total |
|---|---|---|---|---|---|
| No. 23 Panthers | 21 | 14 | 0 | 7 | 42 |
| Midshipmen | 7 | 7 | 0 | 7 | 21 |

(Game report)

=== Rutgers ===
| | 1 | 2 | 3 | 4 | Total |
|---|---|---|---|---|---|
| Scarlet Knights | 14 | 20 | 14 | 6 | 54 |
| No. 17 Panthers | 7 | 17 | 7 | 3 | 34 |

(Game report)

=== Notre Dame ===
| | 1 | 2 | 3 | 4 | OT | 2OT | 3OT | 4OT | Total |
|---|---|---|---|---|---|---|---|---|---|
| Panthers | 3 | 0 | 7 | 14 | 3 | 3 | 3 | 3 | 36 |
| Fighting Irish | 3 | 14 | 0 | 7 | 3 | 3 | 3 | 0 | 33 |

The Panthers came away with a 36–33, four-overtime victory after falling behind Notre Dame by two touchdowns, 17–3, at halftime. Conor Lee made the game-winning field goal, one of four overtime fields goals, during his perfect, 5-for-5 day to help lead the Panthers. His five field goals and 18 points are both Pitt records for a kicker; he also extended his school record of consecutive extra points without a miss to 100. LeSean McCoy led the way on offense with 32 rushing attempts for 169 yards, his 5th straight 100-yard game, and one touchdown as he surpassed 1,000 yards rushing for the season; he also had two catches for 23 yards. The Panthers fell behind in the first half when Notre Dame controlled the clock and took advantage of poor play by Pitt on offense. Quarterbacks Kevan Smith and Pat Bostick, who were playing in place of the injured started Bill Stull, who suffered a concussion in the previous game, were ineffective in the first half, and the running game couldn't get going as McCoy had only 5 yards on 3 carries. In total, the offense only had 71 yards and five first downs in the entire first half. The offense got back on track in the 2nd half as the Panthers scored 10 straight points to tie the game at 17. The Panthers first possession of the 3rd quarter went eight plays and 71 yards, including a converted fourth-and-one pass that Oderick Turner turned into a 37-yard gain. The Panthers next touchdown came on a 15-play, 70-yard drive that used 8:28 of time during the end of the 3rd and beginning of the 4th quarters. Pat Bostick, although he was intercepted three times in the game, persevered and stepped up his play in the second half, leading the Panthers on three critical scoring drives. After the game Bostick, speaking of his own performance, said, "I came out and made some mistakes out there, forced a couple of things, made a couple of plays. We made enough plays to win though and this was a total team win... But the bottom line is we are here to win a football game and when you throw picks, it is not about you, you can't say 'Woe is me.' It is all about, 'What do I have to do on the next drive to take this team down the field to win the game?'" The Panthers defense, led again by linebacker Scott McKillop with 15 tackles, played significantly better than in the week before, allowing only one big play versus the Irish's offense, a 47-yard pass from Jimmy Clausen to Golden Tate. They also held Notre Dame to only 146 yards in the second half and all four overtimes, including just seven yards on three three-and-out possessions in the third quarter. (Game report)

=== Louisville ===
| | 1 | 2 | 3 | 4 | Total |
|---|---|---|---|---|---|
| Cardinals | 0 | 0 | 7 | 0 | 7 |
| Panthers | 10 | 7 | 3 | 21 | 41 |

(Game report)

=== Cincinnati ===
| | 1 | 2 | 3 | 4 | Total |
|---|---|---|---|---|---|
| No. 20 Panthers | 7 | 0 | 0 | 14 | 21 |
| No. 19 Bearcats | 0 | 14 | 7 | 7 | 28 |

(Game report)

=== West Virginia ===
| | 1 | 2 | 3 | 4 | Total |
|---|---|---|---|---|---|
| Mountaineers | 0 | 3 | 9 | 3 | 15 |
| No. 25 Panthers | 7 | 0 | 0 | 12 | 19 |

(Game report)

=== Connecticut ===
| | 1 | 2 | 3 | 4 | Total |
|---|---|---|---|---|---|
| No. 23 Panthers | 0 | 3 | 24 | 7 | 34 |
| Huskies | 0 | 3 | 7 | 0 | 10 |

(Game report)

=== Oregon State (2008 Sun Bowl) ===
| | 1 | 2 | 3 | 4 | Total |
|---|---|---|---|---|---|
| Beavers | 0 | 3 | 0 | 0 | 3 |
| No. 20 Panthers | 0 | 0 | 0 | 0 | 0 |

(Game report)

== Personnel ==
=== Coaching staff ===
2008 Pittsburgh Panthers football staff
| Coaching staff: Dave Wannstedt – Head coach; Greg Gattuso – Assistant head coach/defensive line; Matt Cavanaugh – Offensive coordinator/quarterbacks; Phil Bennett – Defensive coordinator; Brian Angelichio – Tight ends; Bryan Bossard – Wide receivers; Jeff Hafley – Secondary; Joe Tumpkin – Linebackers; David Walker – Running backs; Tony Wise – Offensive line | Support staff: Chris LaSala – Assistant athletic director/football operations; Mike Antonoplos – Assistant director of football operations; Bob Junko – Director of football operations and program enhancement; Scott Turner – Offensive graduate assistant; Greg Williams – Defensive graduate assistant | Strength and conditioning staff: Buddy Morris – Strength and conditioning coach; James Smith – Assistant coach of physical preparation |

=== Roster ===
2008 Pittsburgh Panthers roster
| Quarterbacks: 4 Andrew Janocko – RS Fr; 11 Bill Stull – RS Jr; 12 Kevan Smith – RS Jr; 14 Greg Cross – Jr; 16 Tino Sunseri – (redshirt) Fr; 19 Pat Bostick – So Tailbacks: 24 Kevin Collier – RS So; 25 LeSean McCoy – So; 29 Chris Burns – (redshirt) Fr; 34 LaRod Stephens-Howling – Sr; 43 Shariff Harris – RS Fr Fullbacks: 6 Chris Bova – RS Jr; 27 Henry Hynoski – RS Fr; 30 Conredge Collins – Sr Wide receivers: 1 Cedric McGee – RS Jr; 3 Aaron Smith – RS Fr; 5 (injured) Cameron Saddler – (redshirt) Fr; 9 Tamarcus "T.J." Porter – Jr; 10 Aundre Wright – RS Fr; 81 Derek Kinder – RS Sr; 82 Jon Baldwin – Fr; 85 Francis Johns – RS So; 85 Samson Horne – RS So; 87 Mike Shanahan – (redshirt) Fr; 88 Oderick Turner – RS Jr Tight ends: 2 Dorin Dickerson – Jr; 80 Nate Byham – Jr; 83 John Pelusi – RS Jr; 85 Mike Cruz – (redshirt) Fr; 92 Justin Virbitsky – (redshirt) Fr | Offensive line: 52 Lucas Nix G – Fr; 53 Alex Karabin C – RS So; 54 Chris Jacobson G – RS Fr; 55 C. J. Davis G/C – Sr; 56 Joe Thomas T – Jr; 59 Mark Estermyer LS – RS Sr; 60 Greg Gaskins T – RS Fr; 62 John Bachman G – RS Jr; 63 Wayne Jones G/C – RS Fr; 64 (injured) Robb Houser C – Jr; 66 Scott Corson G – RS So; 67 Dan Matha T– RS Fr; 68 Jordan Gibbs T – RS Fr; 69 Jared Martin C – RS So; 70 Dominic Williams G – RS Sr; 71 John Fieger G – RS Fr; 72 Chase Clowser T – RS Sr; 74 John Malecki G – Jr; 75 Ryan Turnley T – (redshirt) Fr; 76 Frank Kochin T – RS Sr; 77 Jason Pinkston T – RS So; 78 Josh Novotny – RS Jr Defensive line: 45 Tyler Tkach DE – RS So; 48 Doug Fulmer DE – RS Jr; 50 Rashaad Duncan DT – Sr; 51 Tommie Duhart DT – Jr; 57 Craig Bokor DT – RS Jr; 90 Tony Jaye Tucker Jr. DE – RS Fr; 91 Greg Romeus DE – RS So; 93 Gus Mustakas DT – RS Jr; 94 Myles Caragein DT – RS Fr; 95 Mick Williams DT – RS Jr; 95 Justin Hargrove DE – RS Fr; 97 Jabaal Sheard DE – So; 98 Chas Alecxih DT – RS Fr | Linebackers: 6 Steve Dell MLB – RS Jr; 8 (injured) Adam Gunn OLB – RS Sr; 15 (injured) Shane Murray OLB – RS Jr; 16 Brian Kaiser OLB – RS Jr; 32 Tristan Roberts OLB – RS Fr; 35 Brandon Lindsey MLB – RS Fr; 38 Greg Williams OLB – RS Fr; 40 Scott McKillop MLB – RS Sr; 41 Manny Williams – (redshirt) Fr; 44 Nate Nix OLB – RS So; 46 Shayne Hale – (redshirt) Fr; 49 Max Gruder OLB – RS Fr; 53 Joe Trebitz – (redshirt) Fr; 86 Austin Ransom OLB – RS Sr Defensive backs: 4 Elijah Fields SS – RS So; 5 Scott Shrake – Sr; 7 Jovani Chappel CB – Jr; 11 Dan Cafaro – RS Jr; 17 Aaron Berry CB – Jr; 20 Irvan Brown FS – RS Jr; 21 Buddy Jackson CB – RS Fr; 22 Antwuan Reed CB – Fr; 23 Ronald Hobby CB – (redshirt) Fr; 26 Ricky Gary CB – RS So; 28 Eric Thatcher FS – RS Sr; 31 Dom DeCicco SS – So; 36 Michael Toerper S – RS Jr; 36 Andrew Taglianetti – Fr; 39 Jarred Holley CB – (redshirt) Fr Punters: 18 Dave Brytus – RS Sr Kickers: 24 Luke Briggs – RS So; 27 Cody Sawhill – Sr; 31 Dan Hutchins – RS So; 37 Conor Lee – RS Sr; 47 Kevin Harper – (redshirt) Fr |
Classes key: Fr – Freshman; first year player So – Sophomore; second year player Jr – Junior; third year player Sr – Senior; fourth year player RS – Previously used a redshirt season (redshirt) – Redshirted during the 2008 season

== Statistics ==
Regular season totals

=== Team ===
| | Pitt | Opp |
|---|---|---|
| Scoring | 352 | 276 |
| Points/game | 29.3 | 23.0 |
| Total offense | 4274 | 3850 |
| Yards/game | 356.2 | 320.8 |
| Rushing attempts - yards | 455 – 1719 | 421 - 1534 |
| Passing attempts - yards | 353 – 2555 | 353 - 2316 |
| Fumbles - lost | 21 - 12 | 17 – 7 |
| Penalties - yards | 55 – 425 | 66 - 576 |
| Time of possession/game | 31:32 | 28:28 |
| 3rd down conversions | 61/166 (37%) | 61/170 (36%) |
| 4th down conversions | 13/18 (72%) | 7/18 (39%) |
| Touchdowns, total | 42 | 35 |
| Touchdowns, rushing | 29 | 14 |
| Touchdowns, passing | 10 | 19 |
| Touchdowns, other | 3 | 0 |
| Punts - yards/punt | 53 - 39.5 | 62 – 40.0 |
| Field goals/attempts | 20/23 | 12/18 |
| PAT/attempts | 38/38 | 30/34 |

=== Scores by quarter ===
| | 1 | 2 | 3 | 4 | OT | Total |
|---|---|---|---|---|---|---|
| Pitt | 79 | 88 | 51 | 122 | 12 | 352 |
| Opponents | 54 | 88 | 78 | 47 | 9 | 276 |

=== Individual ===
==== Rushing ====
Minimum five attempts or one touchdown

| Name | GP | Att | Yds | Avg | TD | Long | Yds/game |
|---|---|---|---|---|---|---|---|
| McCoy | 12 | 284 | 1403 | 4.9 | 21 | 58 | 116.9 |
| Stephens-Howling | 12 | 70 | 283 | 4.0 | 5 | 27 | 23.6 |
| Collins | 12 | 21 | 85 | 4.0 | 0 | 25 | 7.1 |
| Wright | 12 | 5 | 34 | 6.8 | 1 | 20 | 2.8 |
| Harris | 12 | 12 | 21 | 1.8 | 0 | 4 | 1.8 |
| Cross | 2 | 4 | 15 | 3.8 | 1 | 17 | 7.5 |
| Bostick | 5 | 5 | -27 | -5.4 | 0 | 1 | -5.4 |
| Stull | 11 | 32 | -122 | -3.8 | 1 | 11 | -11.1 |
| Total | 12 | 455 | 1719 | 3.8 | 29 | 58 | 143.2 |
| Opponents | 12 | 421 | 1534 | 3.6 | 14 | 57 | 127.8 |

==== Passing ====
| Name | GP | Rating | Comp | Att | Int | % | Yds | TD | Long | Yds/game |
|---|---|---|---|---|---|---|---|---|---|---|
| Stull | 11 | 126.22 | 181 | 306 | 9 | 59.2 | 2304 | 9 | 64 | 209.5 |
| Bostick | 5 | 91.77 | 20 | 38 | 4 | 52.6 | 233 | 1 | 37 | 46.6 |
| Smith | 1 | 44.53 | 65 | 3 | 0 | 33.3 | 4 | 0 | 4 | 4.0 |
| McCoy | 12 | 108.80 | 1 | 2 | 0 | 50.0 | 14 | 0 | 14 | 1.2 |
| Janocko | 12 | 0.00 | 0 | 1 | 0 | 0.0 | 0 | 0 | 0 | 0.0 |
| Brytus | 12 | 100.00 | 1 | 1 | 0 | 100.0 | 0 | 0 | 0 | 0.0 |
| Total | 12 | 120.57 | 204 | 353 | 13 | 57.8 | 2555 | 10 | 64 | 212.9 |
| Opponents | 12 | 119.90 | 194 | 353 | 14 | 55.0 | 2316 | 19 | 79 | 193.0 |

==== Receiving ====
| Name | GP | Catches | Yds | Avg | TD | Long | Yds/game |
|---|---|---|---|---|---|---|---|
| Kinder | 12 | 35 | 410 | 11.7 | 3 | 61 | 34.2 |
| McCoy | 12 | 31 | 299 | 9.6 | 0 | 34 | 24.9 |
| Porter | 12 | 24 | 352 | 14.7 | 0 | 64 | 29.3 |
| McGee | 12 | 22 | 190 | 8.6 | 0 | 17 | 15.8 |
| Turner | 12 | 21 | 298 | 14.2 | 1 | 38 | 24.8 |
| Baldwin | 12 | 18 | 404 | 22.4 | 3 | 60 | 33.7 |
| Byham | 12 | 18 | 250 | 13.9 | 1 | 34 | 20.8 |
| Dickerson | 12 | 11 | 137 | 12.5 | 2 | 41 | 11.4 |
| Stephens-Howling | 12 | 10 | 101 | 10.1 | 0 | 16 | 8.4 |
| Collins | 12 | 9 | 77 | 8.6 | 0 | 18 | 6.4 |
| Pelusi | 12 | 5 | 37 | 7.4 | 0 | 15 | 3.1 |
| Total | 12 | 204 | 2555 | 12.5 | 10 | 64 | 212.9 |
| Opponents | 12 | 194 | 2316 | 11.9 | 19 | 79 | 193.0 |

== Awards ==
- Aaron Berry – Second team All-Big East
- Nate Byham – First team All-Big East
- C. J. Davis – First team All-Big East
- Connor Lee – First team All-Big East, Big East football Scholar-Athlete of the Year
- LeSean McCoy – First team All-Big East
- Scott McKillop – First team All-American, Big East Defensive Player of the Year, first team All-Big East
- Greg Romeus – Second team All-Big East

== Team players drafted into the NFL ==
| Player | Position | Round | Pick | NFL club |
| LeSean McCoy | Running back | 2 | 53 | Philadelphia Eagles |
| Scott McKillop | Linebacker | 5 | 146 | San Francisco 49ers |
| LaRod Stephens-Howling | Running back | 7 | 240 | Arizona Cardinals |
| Derek Kinder | Wide receiver | 7 | 251 | Chicago Bears |
