= 2008 Louisville Cardinals football team =

American college football season

2008 Louisville Cardinals football
- Conference: Big East Conference
- Record: 5–7 (1–6 Big East)
- Head coach: Steve Kragthorpe (2nd season)
- Offensive coordinator: Jeff Brohm (1st season)
- Offensive scheme: Multiple
- Defensive coordinator: Ron English (1st season)
- Base defense: 4–3
- Home stadium: Papa John's Cardinal Stadium

2008 Big East Conference football standings
	Conf.			Overall
Team	W		L	W		L
No. 17 Cincinnati $	6	–	1	11	–	3
Pittsburgh	5	–	2	9	–	4
No. 23 West Virginia	5	–	2	9	–	4
Rutgers	5	–	2	8	–	5
Connecticut	3	–	4	8	–	5
South Florida	2	–	5	8	–	5
Louisville	1	–	6	5	–	7
Syracuse	1	–	6	3	–	9
$ – BCS representative as conference champion; Rankings from AP Poll

The 2008 Louisville Cardinals football team represented the University of Louisville in the 2008 NCAA Division I FBS football season. The team, led by Steve Kragthorpe in his second year at the school, played their home games in Papa John's Cardinal Stadium and were in their second year as members of the Big East Conference.

== Schedule ==
Date	Time	Opponent	Site	TV	Result	Attendance
August 31	3:30 pm	Kentucky*	Papa John's Cardinal Stadium; Louisville, Kentucky (Governor's Cup)	ESPN	L 2–27	42,696
September 6	3:30 pm	Tennessee Tech*	Papa John's Cardinal Stadium; Louisville, Kentucky	ESPN360/WHAS	W 51–10	38,694
September 17	8:00 pm	Kansas State*	Papa John's Cardinal Stadium; Louisville, Kentucky	ESPN2	W 38–29	42,208
September 26	8:00 pm	Connecticut	Papa John's Cardinal Stadium; Louisville, Kentucky	ESPN2	L 21–26	42,523
October 10	3:30 pm	at Memphis*	Liberty Bowl Memorial Stadium; Memphis, Tennessee (rivalry)	ESPN	W 35–28	40,248
October 18	3:30 pm	Middle Tennessee*^{†}	Papa John's Cardinal Stadium; Louisville, Kentucky		W 42–23	38,319
October 25	3:30 pm	No. 14 South Florida	Papa John's Cardinal Stadium; Louisville, Kentucky	ESPN360	W 24–20	40,384
November 1	7:05 pm	at Syracuse	Carrier Dome; Syracuse, New York	ESPNU	L 21–28	32,917
November 8	12:00 pm	at No. 25 Pittsburgh	Heinz Field; Pittsburgh	ESPN360	L 7–41	44,055
November 14	8:00 pm	No. 22 Cincinnati	Papa John's Cardinal Stadium; Louisville, Kentucky (The Keg of Nails)	ESPN2	L 20–28	37,822
November 22	12:00 pm	West Virginia	Papa John's Cardinal Stadium; Louisville, Kentucky	ESPN	L 21–35	34,796
December 4	7:30 pm	at Rutgers	Rutgers Stadium; Piscataway, New Jersey	ESPN	L 14–63	42,347
*Non-conference game; ^{†}Homecoming; Rankings from Associated Press; All times are in Eastern time

== Game summaries ==
=== Kentucky ===
	1	2	3	4	Total
Wildcats	0	10	0	17	27
Cardinals	0	0	0	2	2

=== Tennessee Tech ===
	1	2	3	4	Total
Golden Eagles	0	3	0	7	10
Cardinals	13	21	17	0	51

=== Kansas State ===
	1	2	3	4	Total
Wildcats	7	0	7	15	29
Cardinals	0	14	14	10	38

=== Connecticut ===
	1	2	3	4	Total
Huskies	3	7	7	9	26
Cardinals	0	14	7	0	21

=== At Memphis ===
	1	2	3	4	Total
Cardinals	0	28	0	7	35
Tigers	7	7	14	0	28

=== Middle Tennessee ===
	1	2	3	4	Total
Blue Raiders	14	3	0	6	23
Cardinals	7	7	7	21	42

=== No. 14 South Florida ===
	1	2	3	4	Total
No. 14 Bulls	0	6	7	7	20
Cardinals	0	14	0	10	24

=== At Syracuse ===
	1	2	3	4	Total
Cardinals	7	0	7	7	21
Orange	7	7	7	7	28

=== At No. 25 Pittsburgh ===
	1	2	3	4	Total
Cardinals	0	0	7	0	7
No. 25 Panthers	10	7	3	21	41

=== No. 22 Cincinnati ===
	1	2	3	4	Total
No. 22 Bearcats	7	7	7	7	28
Cardinals	7	10	3	0	20

=== West Virginia ===
	1	2	3	4	Total
Mountaineers	7	0	21	7	35
Cardinals	7	0	7	7	21

=== At Rutgers ===
	1	2	3	4	Total
Cardinals	0	0	7	7	14
Scarlet Knights	14	35	7	7	63
