= Robert Lunn =

American football player

Robert "Rob" Lunn is a former defensive tackle from University of Connecticut. He earned Academic All Big East accolades in 2005, 2006, 2007, and 2008. Winner of the coveted "Iron Husky" award in 2007 for "Unbreakable Work Ethic" Lunn was a fixture on UConn's talented defensive line. In 2007, Lunn was awarded the Defensive Player of the Game (Game Ball) for his 11 tackle and two sack performance at home against Rutgers.

A member of the 2004 Motor City Bowl, 2007 Meineke Car Care Bowl, and 2008 International Bowl Teams.

He graduated in 2008 and after a professional tryouts with Seattle and Arizona traveled overseas. He played two (2) seasons with the Arizona Cardinals. He played professional football with the Carinthian Black Lions in Portchach, Austria. leading them to their first playoff berth before concluding his on-field career.

He played his high school ball at Penfield High School, setting school records or sacks in a single game (5), season (17), and career (31). He played in the 2004 New York v. New Jersey all-star game known as "The Governor's Cup", in which the top 50 seniors players from both states play against each other.

During his senior season at the University of Connecticut, he started his personal blog "Thoughts From A Fat White Guy." He went on to become a sports blogger and on-air personality for New England Sports Network and ESPN Radio. Also known for his appearances on Chris Cooley, GQ.com, ESPN.com, Maxim.com, Fatpickled.com and Deadspin.

Rob is also a Mansfield, Connecticut YouTube sensation. His famous video features him catching a beer can behind his back that was tossed from above.
