= 2008 North Carolina Tar Heels football team =

American college football season

2008 North Carolina Tar Heels football

Meineke Car Care Bowl, L 30–31 vs. West Virginia
- Conference: Atlantic Coast Conference
- Coastal Division
- Record: 0–5, 8 wins vacated (0–4 ACC, 4 wins vacated)
- Head coach: Butch Davis (2nd season)
- Offensive coordinator: John Shoop (2nd season)
- Offensive scheme: Pro-style
- Defensive coordinator: Everett Withers (1st season)
- Base defense: 4–3
- Captains: Ryan Taylor; Matt Merletti; Garrett Reynolds; Hakeem Nicks; Trimane Goddard; Mark Paschal
- Home stadium: Kenan Memorial Stadium

2008 Atlantic Coast Conference football standings
	Conf.			Overall
Team	W		L	W		L
Atlantic Division
Boston College xy	5	–	3	9	–	5
No. 21 Florida State x	5	–	3	9	–	4
Maryland	4	–	4	8	–	5
Wake Forest	4	–	4	8	–	5
Clemson	4	–	4	7	–	6
NC State	4	–	4	6	–	7
Coastal Division
No. 15 Virginia Tech xy$	5	–	3	10	–	4
No. 22 Georgia Tech x	5	–	3	9	–	4
North Carolina	0	–	4	0	–	5
Miami (FL)	4	–	4	7	–	6
Virginia	3	–	5	5	–	7
Duke	1	–	7	4	–	8
Championship: Virginia Tech 30, Boston College 12
$ – BCS representative as conference champion; x – Division champion/co-champions; y – Championship game participant; North Carolina vacated 8 wins, including 4 ACC wins; Rankings from AP Poll

The 2008 North Carolina Tar Heels football team represented the University of North Carolina at Chapel Hill as a member of Coastal Division of the Atlantic Coast Conference (ACC) during the 2008 NCAA Division I FBS football season. Led by second-year head coach Butch Davis, the Tar Heels played their home games at Kenan Memorial Stadium in Chapel Hill, North Carolina. North Carolina finished the season 8–5 overall and 4–4 in ACC play to tie for third in the Coastal Division. The Tar Heels lost to West Virginia in the Meineke Car Care Bowl. In 2011, North Carolina vacated all its wins from the 2008 and 2009 seasons.

== Recruiting ==
The Tar Heels received 16 letters of intent on National Signing Day, February 6, 2008. One student athlete had already enrolled before National Signing Day and one signed several days later, making this class smaller and less-heralded than the previous year's class.

College recruiting information
Name	Hometown	School	Height	Weight	40^{‡}	Commit date
A. J. Blue; QB	Dallas, North Carolina	North Gaston HS	6 ft 1 in (1.85 m)	208 lb (94 kg)	4.6	Jan 18, 2008
A. J. Blue; QB	Recruit ratings: Scout: Rivals: (75)					
Zach Brown; LB	Columbia, Maryland	Hargrave Military Academy	6 ft 1 in (1.85 m)	213 lb (97 kg)	4.42	Jan 20, 2008
Zach Brown; LB	Recruit ratings: Scout: Rivals: (79)					
Jonathan Cooper; OG	Wilmington, North Carolina	John T. Hoggard HS	6 ft 3 in (1.91 m)	296 lb (134 kg)	5.1	Jan 25, 2008
Jonathan Cooper; OG	Recruit ratings: Scout: Rivals: (78)					
Quinton Coples; DE	Kinston, North Carolina	Hargrave Military Academy	6 ft 6 in (1.98 m)	237 lb (108 kg)	4.65	Feb 6, 2008
Quinton Coples; DE	Recruit ratings: Scout: Rivals: (78)					
Herman Davidson; S	Long Beach, California	Polytechnic HS	6 ft 3 in (1.91 m)	215 lb (98 kg)	4.5	Feb 6, 2008
Herman Davidson; S	Recruit ratings: Scout: Rivals: (40)					
Dion Guy; LB	Washington, D.C.	Woodson HS	6 ft 3 in (1.91 m)	219 lb (99 kg)	4.61	Feb 4, 2008
Dion Guy; LB	Recruit ratings: Scout: Rivals: (40)					
Braden Hanson; QB	Charlotte, North Carolina	Charlotte Latin HS	6 ft 5 in (1.96 m)	197 lb (89 kg)	NA	Jul 10, 2007
Braden Hanson; QB	Recruit ratings: Scout: Rivals: (73)					
Todd Harrelson; WR	Chesapeake, Virginia	Oscar F. Smith HS	6 ft 1 in (1.85 m)	188 lb (85 kg)	4.53	Jun 28, 2007
Todd Harrelson; WR	Recruit ratings: Scout: Rivals: (78)					
Kenneth Harris; LB	Decatur, Georgia	Columbia HS	6 ft 4 in (1.93 m)	206 lb (93 kg)	4.60	Feb 3, 2008
Kenneth Harris; LB	Recruit ratings: Scout: Rivals: (40)					
Dwight Jones; WR	Burlington, North Carolina	Cummings HS	6 ft 4 in (1.93 m)	210 lb (95 kg)	4.61	Jan 26, 2007
Dwight Jones; WR	Recruit ratings: Scout: Rivals: (81)					
Michael McAdoo; DE	Antioch, Tennessee	Antioch HS	6 ft 7 in (2.01 m)	228 lb (103 kg)	4.75	Jan 31, 2008
Michael McAdoo; DE	Recruit ratings: Scout: Rivals: (77)					
Ebele Okakpu; LB	Roswell, Georgia	Roswell HS	6 ft 2 in (1.88 m)	208 lb (94 kg)	4.50	Aug 4, 2007
Ebele Okakpu; LB	Recruit ratings: Scout: Rivals: (75)					
Robert Quinn; DE	North Charleston, South Carolina	Fort Dorchester HS	6 ft 5 in (1.96 m)	250 lb (110 kg)	4.72	Feb 6, 2008
Robert Quinn; DE	Recruit ratings: Scout: Rivals: (80)					
Kevin Reddick; LB	New Bern, North Carolina	New Bern HS	6 ft 2 in (1.88 m)	220 lb (100 kg)	4.57	Jan 13, 2008
Kevin Reddick; LB	Recruit ratings: Scout: Rivals: (78)					
Joseph Townsend; DT	San Jose, California	Foothill College	6 ft 4 in (1.93 m)	290 lb (130 kg)	4.87	Feb 9, 2008
Joseph Townsend; DT	Recruit ratings: Scout: Rivals: (NA)					
Randy White; TE	Bristol, Virginia	Virginia HS	6 ft 5 in (1.96 m)	234 lb (106 kg)	4.79	Jun 15, 2007
Randy White; TE	Recruit ratings: Scout: Rivals: (73)					
Melvin Williams; S	Lebanon, Tennessee	Coffeyville CC	6 ft 0 in (1.83 m)	203 lb (92 kg)	4.55	Oct 23, 2007
Melvin Williams; S	Recruit ratings: Scout: Rivals: (NA)					
Christian Wilson; TE	McKees Rocks, Pennsylvania	Montour HS	6 ft 3 in (1.91 m)	235 lb (107 kg)	4.60	Feb 6, 2008
Christian Wilson; TE	Recruit ratings: Scout: Rivals: (81)					
Jamal Womble; RB	Sierra Vista, Arizona	Buena HS	5 ft 10 in (1.78 m)	221 lb (100 kg)	4.41	Dec 5, 2007
Jamal Womble; RB	Recruit ratings: Scout: Rivals: (78)					
Overall recruit ranking: Scout: 15 Rivals: 16
‡ Refers to 40-yard dash; Note: In many cases, Scout, Rivals, 247Sports, On3, and ESPN may conflict in their listings of height, weight and 40 time.; In these cases, the average was taken. ESPN grades are on a 100-point scale.; Sources: "2007 Team Ranking". Rivals.com.

== Coaching staff ==
After signing a contract extension at the end of the 2007 season, Butch Davis enters his second season as head coach. Chuck Pagano resigned as defensive coordinator and defensive backs coach to become an assistant coach with the Baltimore Ravens in the NFL. He was replaced by Minnesota assistant Everett Withers.

Name	Position	Seasons in Position
Butch Davis	Head coach	2nd
John Blake	Associate head coach / recruiting coordinator / defensive line	2nd
Ken Browning	Running backs	15th
Jeff Connors	Strength and conditioning coordinator	8th
Steve Hagen	Tight Ends	2nd
John Lovett	Special teams coordinator / Defensive Assistant	2nd
Sam Pittman	Offensive Line	2nd
John Shoop	Offensive coordinator / quarterbacks	2nd
Tommy Thigpen	Linebackers	4th
Charlie Williams	Wide Receivers	2nd
Everett Withers	Defensive coordinator / defensive backs	1st

- Brad Davis (graduate assistant)

== Roster ==
Wide Receiver: 1 Brooks Foster – Senior; 2 Cooter Arnold – Senior; 3 Kenton Thornton – Junior; 15 Anthony Parker-Boyd – Sophomore; 19 Josh Washburn – Junior; 23 Quentin Plair – Sophomore; 34 Brett Long – Senior; 82 Todd Harrelson – Freshman; 83 Dwight Jones – Freshman; 85 Rashad Mason – (redshirt) Freshman; 87 Brandon Tate – Senior; 88 Hakeem Nicks – Junior; Offensive lineman: 60 Zack Handerson – Sophomore; 64 Jonathan Cooper – Freshman; 65 Cam Holland – (redshirt) Freshman; 66 Mike Ingersoll – Sophomore; 67 Morgan Randall – Sophomore; 68 Mike Dykes – (redshirt) Freshman; 69 Lowell Dyer – Junior; 70 Alan Pelc – Sophomore; 71 Carl Gaskins – (redshirt) Freshman; 72 Kyle Jolly – Junior; 73 Aaron Stahl – Junior; 74 Sam Ellis – Sophomore; 75 Garrett Reynolds – Senior; 76 Bryon Bishop – Senior; 77 Kevin Bryant – (redshirt) Freshman; 79 Calvin Darity – Senior; Half-back: 17 Zack Pianalto – Sophomore; 33 Christian Wilson – Freshman; Tight End: 80 Ed Barham – Sophomore; 81 B.J. Phillips – Sophomore; 86 Randy White – Freshman; 89 Richard Quinn – Senior	Quarterback: 7 Mike Paulus – (redshirt) Freshman; 11 Cameron Sexton – Junior; 13 T. J. Yates – Sophomore; 14 Braden Hanson – Freshman; Running Back: 5 Jamal Womble – Freshman; 8 Greg Little – Sophomore; 20 Shaun Draughn – Sophomore; 30 Carter Brown – Sophomore; 32 Ryan Houston – Sophomore; 45 Devon Ramsay – (redshirt) Freshman; Fullback: 4 Bobby Rome – Junior; 6 Anthony Elzy – Sophomore; 43 Curtis Byrd – Sophomore; Defensive tackle: 9 Marvin Austin – Sophomore; 91 Tydreke Powell – (redshirt) Freshman; 93 Cam Thomas – Junior; 94 Brian White – Junior; 96 Tavares Brown – Junior; 97 Aleric Mullins – Junior; Defensive End: 40 Darius Powell – Sophomore; 42 Robert Quinn – Freshman; 84 Vince Jacobs – Sophomore; 90 Quinton Coples – Freshman; 92 E. J. Wilson – Junior; 94 Michael McAdoo – Freshman; 95 Greg Elleby – Sophomore; 98 Darrius Massenburg – Sophomore; Cornerback: 12 Charles Brown – Sophomore; 16 Kendric Burney – Sophomore; 23 Jordan Hemby – Junior; 24 Tavorris Jolly – Sophomore; 26 Richie Rich – Junior; 29 Brian Gupton – (redshirt) Freshman; 34 Johnny White – Sophomore; 37 LaCount Fantroy – (redshirt) Freshman	Linebacker: 35 Herman Davidson – Freshman; 36 Kennedy Tinsley – Junior; 41 Mark Paschal – Senior; 44 Chase Rice – Senior; 45 Alex Crisp – Sophomore; 47 Zach Brown – Freshman; 49 Ryan Taylor – Junior; 52 Quan Sturdivant – Sophomore; 53 Kenneth Harris – Freshman; 54 Bruce Carter – Sophomore; 55 Linwan Euwell – (redshirt) Freshman; 57 Dion Guy – Freshman; 57 Hayden Hunter – Sophomore; 58 Ebele Okakpu – Freshman; Safety: 7 Josh Stewart – Sophomore; 10 Melvin Williams – Junior; 21 Da'Norris Searcy – Sophomore; 25 Matt Merletti – Sophomore; 27 Deunta Williams – Sophomore; 28 Jonathan Smith – Sophomore; 31 Trimane Goddard – Senior; 32 Tyler Caldwell – Junior; 32 Jeff Everett – Freshman; 43 Jabir Jones – Senior; Long Snapper: 51 Trevor Stuart – Sophomore; 58 Mark House – Sophomore; Punter / Place Kicker: 11 Casey Barth – Freshman; 16 Trase Jones – Sophomore; 17 Grant Schallock – Sophomore; 18 Jay Wooten – (redshirt) Freshman; 19 Terrence Brown – Senior; 29 Reid Phillips – Sophomore

== Schedule ==
Date	Time	Opponent	Rank	Site	TV	Result	Attendance
August 30	6:05 p.m.	McNeese State*		Kenan Memorial Stadium; Chapel Hill, NC	ESPN360	W 35–27 (vacated)	58,000
September 11	7:45 p.m.	at Rutgers*		Rutgers Stadium; Piscataway, NJ	ESPN	W 44–12 (vacated)	42,502
September 20	3:30 p.m.	Virginia Tech		Kenan Memorial Stadium; Chapel Hill, NC	ABC/ESPN	L 17–20	59,800
September 27	12:00 p.m.	at Miami (FL)		Dolphin Stadium; Miami Gardens, FL	ESPN2	W 28–24 (vacated)	35,830
October 4	7:00 p.m.	No. 24 Connecticut*		Kenan Memorial Stadium; Chapel Hill, NC	ESPN2	W 38–12 (vacated)	59,500
October 11	3:30 p.m.	Notre Dame*	No. 22	Kenan Memorial Stadium; Chapel Hill, NC (rivalry)	ABC/ESPN	W 29–24 (vacated)	60,000
October 18	3:30 p.m.	at Virginia	No. 18	Scott Stadium; Charlottesville, VA (South's Oldest Rivalry)	ABC/ESPN2	L 13–16 ^{OT}	52,342
October 25	12:00 p.m.	No. 23 Boston College		Kenan Memorial Stadium; Chapel Hill, NC	Raycom	W 45–24 (vacated)	48,000
November 8	12:00 p.m.	No. 22 Georgia Tech^{†}	No. 19	Kenan Memorial Stadium; Chapel Hill, NC	Raycom	W 28–7 (vacated)	59,000
November 15	3:30 p.m.	at Maryland	No. 17	Byrd Stadium; College Park, MD	ABC/ESPN	L 15–17	46,113
November 22	12:00 p.m.	North Carolina State	No. 25	Kenan Memorial Stadium; Chapel Hill, NC (rivalry)	Raycom	L 10–41	60,000
November 29	3:30 p.m.	at Duke		Wallace Wade Stadium; Durham, NC (Victory Bell)	ESPNU	W 28–20 (vacated)	30,322
December 27	1:00 p.m.	vs. West Virginia*		Bank of America Stadium; Charlotte, NC (Meineke Car Care Bowl)	ESPN	L 30–31	73,712
*Non-conference game; ^{†}Homecoming; Rankings from AP Poll released prior to the game; All times are in Eastern time

== Game summaries ==
=== McNeese State ===
	1	2	3	4	Total
McNeese State	0	14	6	7	27
North Carolina	7	7	7	14	35

Brandon Tate put on a dazzling one-man show, scoring on an 82-yard punt return and putting North Carolina ahead for good with a 57-yard touchdown catch to help the Tar Heels hold off McNeese State 35-27. Tate finished with a school-record 397 all-purpose yards for the Tar Heels, who showed little else in an unimpressive start to their second season under Butch Davis. In a game suspended nearly two hours due to weather, they blew a 14-0 first-half lead and had to rally from a third-quarter deficit against Football Championship Subdivision McNeese State, who outplayed the Heels much of the way. T. J. Yates had 221 passing yards and 2 touchdowns.

=== Rutgers ===
	1	2	3	4	Total
North Carolina	0	17	21	6	44
Rutgers	3	3	0	6	12

T. J. Yates threw three touchdown passes and the Tar Heels won for the first time outside North Carolina since 2002, beating error-prone Rutgers 44-12 in a nationally televised game that pitted Butch Davis against his former pupil, Greg Schiano. Hakeem Nicks and Brandon Tate combined for 10 catches, 204 receiving yards, and three touchdowns as the Heels offense rolled over Rutgers. Carolina's defense generated 4 Rutgers turnovers (3 INTs and a fumble) and scored off of a 66-yard interception return by Bruce Carter.
