= 2008 Cincinnati Bearcats football team =

American college football season

2008 Cincinnati Bearcats football

Big East champion

Orange Bowl, L 7–20 vs Virginia Tech
- Conference: Big East Conference

Ranking
- Coaches: No. 17
- AP: No. 17
- Record: 11–3 (6–1 Big East)
- Head coach: Brian Kelly (2nd season)
- Offensive coordinator: Jeff Quinn (2nd season)
- Offensive scheme: Multiple
- Defensive coordinator: Joe Tresey (2nd season)
- Base defense: 4–3
- Home stadium: Nippert Stadium

2008 Big East Conference football standings
	Conf.			Overall
Team	W		L	W		L
No. 17 Cincinnati $	6	–	1	11	–	3
Pittsburgh	5	–	2	9	–	4
No. 23 West Virginia	5	–	2	9	–	4
Rutgers	5	–	2	8	–	5
Connecticut	3	–	4	8	–	5
South Florida	2	–	5	8	–	5
Louisville	1	–	6	5	–	7
Syracuse	1	–	6	3	–	9
$ – BCS representative as conference champion; Rankings from AP Poll

The 2008 Cincinnati Bearcats football team represented the University of Cincinnati in the 2008 NCAA Division I FBS football season. The team, coached by Brian Kelly, played its homes game in Nippert Stadium. Kelly was in his second full season with the Bearcats after coaching them to a 31–21 win against Southern Miss in the 2007 PapaJohns.com Bowl. On Friday, November 28, 2008, the Bearcats clinched a share of the Big East Conference title for the first time since joining the Big East in 2005. With a victory over Syracuse on November 29, 2008 the Bearcats became the outright football champions of the Big East and set a record with an average attendance of 31,964. After a disappointing loss to Virginia Tech in the 2009 Orange Bowl, the Bearcats finished 17th in the AP Poll for the second consecutive year.

== Schedule ==
Date	Time	Opponent	Rank	Site	TV	Result	Attendance
August 28	7:30 pm	Eastern Kentucky*		Nippert Stadium; Cincinnati, OH		W 40–7	26,913
September 6	3:30 pm	at No. 4 Oklahoma*		Gaylord Family Oklahoma Memorial Stadium; Norman, OK	ABC	L 26–52	84,476
September 20	7:30 pm	Miami (OH)*		Nippert Stadium; Cincinnati, OH (Victory Bell)	ESPN360	W 45–20	31,629
September 27	7:30 pm	at Akron*		Rubber Bowl; Akron, OH	FSN Ohio	W 17–15	16,927
October 3	8:00 pm	at Marshall*		Joan C. Edwards Stadium; Huntington, WV	ESPN	W 33–10	29,237
October 11	12:00 pm	Rutgers^{†}		Nippert Stadium; Cincinnati, OH	Big East Network	W 13–10	32,370
October 25	12:00 pm	at Connecticut		Rentschler Field; East Hartford, CT	Big East Network	L 16–40	40,000
October 30	7:45 pm	No. 23 South Florida		Nippert Stadium; Cincinnati, OH	ESPN	W 24–10	31,175
November 8	7:00 pm	at No. 20 West Virginia		Milan Puskar Stadium; Morgantown, WV	ESPNU	W 26–23 ^{OT}	59,834
November 14	8:00 pm	at Louisville	No. 22	Papa John's Cardinal Stadium; Louisville, KY (The Keg of Nails)	ESPN2	W 28–20	37,822
November 22	7:15 pm	No. 20 Pittsburgh	No. 19	Nippert Stadium; Cincinnati, OH	ESPN2	W 28–21	35,098
November 29	12:00 pm	Syracuse	No. 16	Nippert Stadium; Cincinnati, OH	Big East Network	W 30–10	34,603
December 6	11:30 pm	at Hawaii*	No. 13	Aloha Stadium; Halawa, HI	ESPN2	W 29–24	40,549
January 1	8:00 pm	No. 19 Virginia Tech*	No. 12	Dolphin Stadium; Miami Gardens, FL (Orange Bowl)	FOX	L 7–20	73,602
*Non-conference game; ^{†}Homecoming; Rankings from AP Poll released prior to the game; All times are in Eastern time

== Rankings ==
Ranking movements Legend: ██ Increase in ranking ██ Decrease in ranking — = Not ranked RV = Received votes
	Week																
Poll	Pre	1	2	3	4	5	6	7	8	9	10	11	12	13	14	15	Final
AP	RV	RV	—	—	—	—	—	RV	RV	—	RV	22	19	16	13	12	17
Coaches Poll	RV	RV	—	—	RV	RV	RV	RV	RV	—	RV	22	20	16	12	12	17
Harris	Not released					RV	RV	RV	RV	—	RV	23	20	16	13	12	Not released
BCS	Not released								—	—	—	22	19	16	13	12	Not released

== Game summaries ==
=== Eastern Kentucky ===
	1	2	3	4	Total
Eastern Kentucky	0	0	7	0	7
Cincinnati	6	20	14	0	40

=== Oklahoma ===
	1	2	3	4	Total
Cincinnati	0	13	7	6	26
#4 Oklahoma	14	7	21	10	52

=== Miami ===
	1	2	3	4	Total
Miami	0	13	7	0	20
Cincinnati	10	14	14	7	45

=== Akron ===
	1	2	3	4	Total
Cincinnati	7	0	7	3	17
Akron	3	6	0	6	15

=== Marshall ===
	1	2	3	4	Total
Cincinnati	2	14	10	7	33
Marshall	0	3	7	0	10

=== Rutgers ===
	1	2	3	4	Total
Rutgers	0	0	10	0	10
Cincinnati	3	7	3	0	13

=== Connecticut ===
	1	2	3	4	Total
Cincinnati	10	3	3	0	16
Connecticut	10	0	10	20	40

=== South Florida ===
	1	2	3	4	Total
#23 South Florida	7	0	3	0	10
Cincinnati	10	7	0	7	24

=== West Virginia ===
	1	2	3	4	OT	Total
Cincinnati	13	7	0	0	6	26
#20 West Virginia	7	0	0	13	3	23

=== Louisville ===
	1	2	3	4	Total
#22 Cincinnati	7	7	7	7	28
Louisville	7	10	3	0	20

=== Pittsburgh ===
	1	2	3	4	Total
#20 Pittsburgh	7	0	0	14	21
#19 Cincinnati	0	14	7	7	28

=== Syracuse ===
	1	2	3	4	Total
Syracuse	0	3	0	7	10
#16 Cincinnati	7	6	10	7	30

=== Hawaii ===
	1	2	3	4	Total
#13 Cincinnati	3	7	0	19	29
Hawaii	0	3	14	7	24

=== Virginia Tech ===
	1	2	3	4	Total
#12 Cincinnati	7	0	0	0	7
#21 Virginia Tech	0	10	3	7	20

== Awards and milestones ==
=== All-Americans ===
- Kevin Huber, P

=== Post-season finalists and winners ===
- Ray Guy Award: Punter of the Year - Kevin Huber (finalist)

=== Big East Conference honors ===
- Special Teams Player of the Year: Mardy Gilyard
- Coach of the Year: Brian Kelly

==== Offensive player of the week ====
- Week 1: Dustin Grutza

==== Defensive player of the week ====
- Week 10: Aaron Webster

==== Special teams player of the week ====
- Week 2: Mardy Gilyard
- Week 6: Connor Barwin
- Week 7: Kevin Huber
- Week 10: Mardy Gillard
- Week 13: Jacob Rogers

==== Big East Conference All-Conference First Team ====
- Mardy Gilyard, WR
- Mardy Gilyard, KR
- Connor Barwin, DL
- Mike Mickens, DB
- Brandon Underwood, DB
- Kevin Huber, P

==== Big East Conference All-Conference Second Team ====
- Dominick Goodman, WR
- Trevor Canfield, OL
- Tony Pike, QB
- Terrill Byrd, DL

== Players in the 2009 NFL draft ==
Player	Position	Round	Pick	NFL club
Connor Barwin	DE	2	46	Houston Texans
Kevin Huber	P	5	142	Cincinnati Bengals
DeAngelo Smith	CB	5	143	Dallas Cowboys
Brandon Underwood	S	6	187	Green Bay Packers
Mike Mickens	CB	7	227	Dallas Cowboys
Trevor Canfield	G	7	254	Arizona Cardinals
