= 2008 South Florida Bulls football team =

American college football season

2008 South Florida Bulls football

St. Petersburg Bowl champion

St. Petersburg Bowl, W 41–14 vs. Memphis
- Conference: Big East Conference
- Record: 8–5 (2–5 Big East)
- Head coach: Jim Leavitt (12th season)
- Offensive coordinator: Greg Gregory (2nd season)
- Offensive scheme: Spread
- Defensive coordinator: Wally Burnham (8th season)
- Base defense: 3–4
- Home stadium: Raymond James Stadium

2008 Big East Conference football standings
	Conf.			Overall
Team	W		L	W		L
No. 17 Cincinnati $	6	–	1	11	–	3
Pittsburgh	5	–	2	9	–	4
No. 23 West Virginia	5	–	2	9	–	4
Rutgers	5	–	2	8	–	5
Connecticut	3	–	4	8	–	5
South Florida	2	–	5	8	–	5
Louisville	1	–	6	5	–	7
Syracuse	1	–	6	3	–	9
$ – BCS representative as conference champion; Rankings from AP Poll

The 2008 South Florida Bulls football team represented the University of South Florida (USF) in the 2008 NCAA Division I FBS football season.

Their head coach was Jim Leavitt, and the USF Bulls played all of their home games at Raymond James Stadium in Tampa, FL. The 2008 college football season was the 12th season overall for the Bulls and also their 12th under Leavitt as head coach. It was their fourth season in the Big East Conference, and eighth in the NCAA Division I Football Bowl Subdivision.

The 2008 season was the first in which the team was ranked in the preseason Associated Press rankings. They started the season ranked 19th and rose as high as 10th. They fell out of the rankings after a string of losses in conference play, and ended the season unranked with an overall 8-5 record (2-5 in Big East conference play). They ended their season with a bowl win over Memphis in the 2008 St. Petersburg Bowl.

== Schedule ==
Date	Time	Opponent	Rank	Site	TV	Result	Attendance
August 30	7:00 p.m.	UT Martin*	No. 19	Raymond James Stadium; Tampa, FL	Big East Network	W 56–7	48,058
September 6	7:00 p.m.	at UCF*	No. 17	Bright House Networks Stadium; Orlando, FL (rivalry)	ESPN2	W 31–24 ^{OT}	46,805
September 12	8:00 p.m.	No. 13 Kansas*	No. 19	Raymond James Stadium; Tampa, FL	ESPN2	W 37–34	58,755
September 20	5:00 p.m.	at FIU*	No. 12	FIU Stadium; Miami, FL	ESPNU	W 17–9	16,717
September 27	7:30 p.m.	at NC State*	No. 13	Carter–Finley Stadium; Raleigh, NC	ESPNU	W 41–10	57,583
October 2	7:30 p.m.	Pittsburgh	No. 10	Raymond James Stadium; Tampa, FL	ESPN	L 21–26	50,307
October 18	12:00 p.m.	Syracuse^{†}	No. 19	Raymond James Stadium; Tampa, FL	Big East Network	W 45–13	51,384
October 25	3:30 p.m.	at Louisville	No. 14	Papa John's Cardinal Stadium; Louisville, KY	Big East Network	L 20–24	40,384
October 30	7:30 p.m.	at Cincinnati	No. 24	Nippert Stadium; Cincinnati, OH	ESPN	L 10–24	31,175
November 15	12:00 p.m.	Rutgers		Raymond James Stadium; Tampa, FL	Big East Network	L 16–49	47,216
November 23	8:00 p.m.	UConn		Raymond James Stadium; Tampa, FL	ESPN	W 17–13	42,422
December 6	8:00 p.m.	at West Virginia		Milan Puskar Stadium; Morgantown, WV	ESPN2	L 7–13	48,019
December 20	4:30 p.m.	vs. Memphis*		Tropicana Field; St. Petersburg, FL (St. Petersburg Bowl)	ESPN2	W 41–14	25,205
*Non-conference game; ^{†}Homecoming; Rankings from AP Poll released prior to the game; All times are in Eastern time

== Rankings ==
Ranking movements Legend: ██ Increase in ranking ██ Decrease in ranking — = Not ranked RV = Received votes
	Week																
Poll	Pre	1	2	3	4	5	6	7	8	9	10	11	12	13	14	15	Final
AP	19	17	19	12	13	10	19	19	14	24	RV	RV	—	—	—	—	—
Coaches	21	18	18	16	14	10	20	20	14	23	RV	—	—	RV	—	—	—
Harris	Not released					12	19	19	14	23	RV	RV	—	—	—	—	Not released
BCS	Not released								16	23	—	—	—	—	—	—	Not released
