= 2008 Syracuse Orange football team =

American college football season

2008 Syracuse Orange football
- Conference: Big East Conference
- Record: 3–9 (1–6 Big East)
- Head coach: Greg Robinson (4th season)
- Offensive coordinator: Mitch Browning (1st season)
- Offensive scheme: Multiple
- Defensive coordinator: Derrick Jackson (1st season)
- Base defense: 4–3
- Home stadium: Carrier Dome

2008 Big East Conference football standings
	Conf.			Overall
Team	W		L	W		L
No. 17 Cincinnati $	6	–	1	11	–	3
Pittsburgh	5	–	2	9	–	4
No. 23 West Virginia	5	–	2	9	–	4
Rutgers	5	–	2	8	–	5
Connecticut	3	–	4	8	–	5
South Florida	2	–	5	8	–	5
Louisville	1	–	6	5	–	7
Syracuse	1	–	6	3	–	9
$ – BCS representative as conference champion; Rankings from AP Poll

The 2008 Syracuse Orange football team represented Syracuse University during the 2008 NCAA Division I FBS football season. The Orange were coached by Greg Robinson and played their home games at the Carrier Dome in Syracuse, New York.

== Before the season ==
The Orange lost its leading receiving from the 2007 season, Mike Williams. Williams was suspended from the team due to academic reasons. The most recent report says that Williams is not enrolled in classes for the fall semester.FB | Leading receiver Williams suspended from school - Sports Williams led the team with 60 catches for 837 yards in 2007. He finished the season on a school-record streak of nine games with a touchdown reception. That mark stands nine short of Larry Fitzgerald's record of 18 consecutive games.

Syracuse's number two receiver, Taj Smith, declared himself eligible for the NFL draft. Smith was not drafted, but did sign as a free agent with the Green Bay Packers. Smith recorded 44 catches for 822 yards in 2007.

=== Recruiting ===
Syracuse landed the nation's No. 50 recruiting class, which featured three 4-star recruits and five 3-star recruits. The class was headlined by Churchville, NY tailback Averin Collier, Syracuse, NY receiver Marcus Sales and New Berlin defensive end Romale Tucker.

== Schedule ==
Date	Time	Opponent	Site	TV	Result	Attendance
August 30	12:00 pm	at Northwestern*	Ryan Field; Evanston, IL	ESPN2	L 10–30	20,015
September 6	3:30 pm	Akron*	Carrier Dome; Syracuse, NY	Time Warner Sports	L 28–42	31,808
September 13	3:30 pm	No. 17 Penn State*	Carrier Dome; Syracuse, NY	ABC	L 13–55	45,745
September 20	3:30 pm	Northeastern*^{†}	Carrier Dome; Syracuse, NY	Time Warner Sports	W 30–21	34,694
September 27	12:00 pm	Pittsburgh	Carrier Dome; Syracuse, NY (rivalry)	Big East Network	L 24–34	27,549
October 11	12:00 pm	at West Virginia	Milan Puskar Stadium; Morgantown, WV (rivalry)	ESPNU	L 6–17	58,133
October 18	12:00 pm	at No. 19 South Florida	Raymond James Stadium; Tampa, FL	Big East Network	L 13–45	51,384
November 1	7:00 pm	Louisville	Carrier Dome; Syracuse, NY	ESPNU	W 28–21	32,917
November 8	12:00 pm	at Rutgers	Rutgers Stadium; Piscataway, NJ	ESPNU	L 17–35	42,172
November 15	7:00 pm	Connecticut	Carrier Dome; Syracuse, NY (rivalry)	ESPNU	L 14–39	28,081
November 22	2:30 pm	at Notre Dame*	Notre Dame Stadium; Notre Dame, IN	NBC	W 24–23	80,795
November 29	12:00 pm	at No. 16 Cincinnati	Nippert Stadium; Cincinnati, OH	Big East Network	L 10–30	34,603
*Non-conference game; ^{†}Homecoming; Rankings from Coaches' Poll released prior to the game

== Game summaries ==
=== Northwestern ===
	1	2	3	4	Total
Orange	3	0	7	0	10
Wildcats	0	9	14	7	30

Syracuse opened the 2008 football season with a 30–10 defeat at the hands of Northwestern. The Orange marched the ball 63 yards on its opening drive, settling for a 36-yard field goal. SU's defense kept Northwestern at bay until late in the second quarter, but the offense provided the Wildcats first points. Syracuse quarterback Andrew Robinson was called for intentional grounding in his own end zone, resulting in a safety. Northwestern closed out the first half with 16-yard touchdown pass.

The Orange took advantage of a Tyrell Sutton fumble to open the second half. The ensuing touchdown run from back Curtis Brinkley gave the Orange its second lead of the game 10–9. Brinkley would finish with 49 yards on nine carries. He was joined by Delone Carter and Doug Hogue in the backfield. Neither broke 50 yards, though Carter's long rush of 32 yards was longer than any carry the Orange had in the 2007 season.

Northwestern closed the game on a 21-point run. One of those touchdowns came off an interception. From the opening drive on, the Orange had only one possession that went longer than 40 yards. The drive resulted in a missed field goal, as kicker Patrick Shadle hit the upright from 51 yards out.

The season opening loss was the Orange's fifth straight.

=== Akron ===
	1	2	3	4	Total
Zips	14	14	0	14	42
Orange	0	14	7	7	28

Syracuse lost its fourth straight home opener and second straight game to a MAC opponent with a 42–28 loss to Akron. The Zips set the pace early, taking the ball 65 yards down the field for a touchdown. Akron scored again in the first quarter. The 79-yard drive was capped off with a 35-yard run by Dennis Kennedy.

The Orange found the endzone for the first time in the second quarter. Quarterback Cam Dantley connected with tight end Mike Owen for a 32-yard touchdown pass, his first career touchdown reception. Akron and Syracuse would then exchange touchdowns on one-yard runs. The Orange's score came from Curtis Brinkley, who set a career-high with 143 yards. The Zips would score again on a one-yard carry heading into halftime.

Syracuse tied the game in the fourth quarter, thanks to two touchdown passes from Dantley. One went for four-yards to Owen; the other was a 15-yard pass to redshirt freshman Nick Provo. Dantley finished 13-of-20 with 135 yards, 3 touchdowns and an interception. Akron put the game out of reach with back-to-back touchdowns.

=== Penn State ===
	1	2	3	4	Total
Nittany Lions	21	17	10	7	55
Orange	0	6	7	0	13

Syracuse renewed its historic rivalry with Penn State with a 55–13 defeat. The teams last played in 1990.

Each of Penn State's three quarterbacks threw touchdown passes. Daryll Clark finished 10 of 21 for 163 yards and two touchdowns, Pat Devlin was 8 of 13 for 130 yards and two touchdowns, and Paul Cianciolo was 2 of 4 for 51 yards and a score. Receivers Jordan Norwood and Deon Butler both had over 100 yards receiving and two touchdowns apiece.

The Nittany Lion defense held the Orange offense without a first down until early in the second quarter.

=== Northeastern ===
	1	2	3	4	Total
Huskies	0	7	0	14	21
Orange	10	0	14	6	30

Syracuse defeated Football Championship Subdivision Northeastern, 30–21, behind a combined 245 yards and two touchdowns from tailbacks Doug Hogue and Curtis Brinkley.

Quarterback Cam Dantley completing 14 of 17 passes for 167 yards and one touchdown in his third straight start for the Orange.

=== Pittsburgh ===
	1	2	3	4	Total
Panthers	3	10	3	18	34
Orange	14	3	7	0	24

Pittsburgh tailback LaRod Stephens-Howling scored two touchdowns in the fourth quarter, Conor Lee kicked four field goals, and Pittsburgh scored 18 unanswered points in the fourth quarter to rally past Syracuse 34–24.

=== West Virginia ===
	1	2	3	4	Total
Orange	3	3	0	0	6
Mountaineers	0	7	0	10	17

Playing without starting quarterback Pat White, West Virginia turned to tailback Noel Devine, who rushed for a career-high 188 yards and a touchdown, in a West Virginia 17–6 win.

Although Syracuse outgained West Virginia 346–268, and SU tailback Curtis Brinkley rushed for 144 yards, the Orange (1–5, 0–2) didn't register a touchdown for the first time in the season.

=== South Florida ===
	1	2	3	4	Total
Orange	3	10	0	0	13
Bulls	14	7	14	10	45

South Florida quarterback Matt Grothe threw three touchdown passes and ran for another as South Florida crushed Syracuse, 45–13. Grothe finished with 72 yards on the ground and went finished 19-for-26 in the air for 248 yards.

=== Louisville ===
	1	2	3	4	Total
Cardinals	7	0	7	7	21
Orange	7	7	7	7	28

Syracuse tailback Curtis Brinkley set a Syracuse single-season record Saturday night with his fifth consecutive 100-yard game as Syracuse upset Louisville for the second year in a row, 28–21.

The win was just head coach Greg Robinson's third Big East Conference win. After the game, Robinson had accumulated a 3–22 overall in four seasons against the Big East.

=== Rutgers ===
	1	2	3	4	Total
Orange	14	0	3	0	17
Scarlet Knights	0	14	14	7	35

Rutgers quarterback Mike Teel threw three touchdown passes and Rutgers overcame a 14-point deficit to beat Syracuse 35–17. The loss made the Orange ineligible to compete in a bowl game for the fourth straight year under coach Robinson.

=== Connecticut ===
	1	2	3	4	Total
Huskies	3	19	17	0	39
Orange	0	14	0	0	14

Connecticut tailback Donald Brown rushed for 131 yards and a touchdown, Jasper Howard scored on a 69-yard punt return and Robert McClain delivered a 37-yard interception return for a score as Connecticut defeated Syracuse 39–14. Connecticut broke the game open after struggling to hold on to a 22–14 second half lead.

=== Notre Dame ===
	1	2	3	4	Total
Orange	3	7	0	14	24
Fighting Irish	3	10	10	0	23

A week after Syracuse announced that it was firing its head coach at the conclusion of the season, Syracuse delivered the biggest win under the Robinson era, stunning the Irish in South Bend, 24–23. QB Cameron Dantley's 11-yard touchdown pass to Donte Davis with 42 seconds left proved to be the game winner, as the Irish lost to an eight-loss team for the first time in its school's storied history.

The victory allowed Syracuse (3–8) to avoid a third 10-loss season in four years under Robinson.

=== Cincinnati ===
	1	2	3	4	Total
Orange	0	3	0	7	10
Bearcats	7	6	10	7	30

The Greg Robinson era came to an end against the Bearcats as the Orange was dominated by the Bearcats. Cincinnati QB Tony Pike threw for 274 yards on 28-of-44 passes while kicker Jake Rogers connected from 45, 38 and 45 yards. Syracuse went 10–47 in coach Greg Robinson's four seasons, including 3–25 in the Big East.

== Rankings ==
Poll	Pre	Wk 1	Wk 2	Wk 3	Wk 4	Wk 5	Wk 6	Wk 7	Wk 8	Wk 9	Wk 10	Wk 11	Wk 12	Wk 13	Wk 14	Final
AP	–	–	–	–	–	–	–	–	–	–	–	–	–	–	–	–
Coaches	–	–	–	–	–	–	–	–	–	–	–	–	–	–	–	–
Harris	Not released				–	–	–	–	–	–	–	–	–	–	–	–
BCS	Not released							–	–	–	–	–	–	–	–	–

== Coaching staff ==
- Greg Robinson – Head Coach/Co-Defensive Coordinator
- Mitch Browning – Offensive Coordinator/Tight Ends & Offensive Tackles
- Derrick Jackson – Co-Defensive Coordinator/Defensive Line
- Phil Earley – Quarterbacks
- Dan Conley – Linebackers
- Jim Salgado – Cornerbacks/Secondary
- Scott Spencer – Safeties
- Randy Trivers – Running Backs
- Chris White – Wide Receivers
- Chris Wiesehan – Offensive Line

== Statistics ==
=== Team ===
	SU	Opp
Scoring	217	392
Points per game	18.1	32.7
First downs	164	270
Rushing	88	127
Passing	64	132
Penalty	12	11
Total offense	3242	4974
Avg per play	4.7	5.9
Avg per game	270.2	414.5
Fumbles-Lost	13–9	13–8
Penalties-Yards	54–460	71–649
Avg per game	38.3	54.1

	SU	Opp
Punts-Yards	66–2898	48–1857
Avg per punt	43.9	38.7
Time of possession/Game	27:15	32:45
3rd down conversions	45/156 29%	85/166 51%
4th down conversions	8/20 40%	9/11 82%
Touchdowns scored	25	48
Field goals-Attempts	14/17 82%	17/21 81%
PAT-Attempts	25/25 100%	47/47 100%
Attendance	200,844	287,102
Games/Avg per Game	33,474	47,850

==== Scores by quarter ====
	1	2	3	4	Total
Syracuse	57	67	52	41	217
Opponents	72	120	99	101	392

=== Offense ===
Note: These lists are not complete. Only the leaders are included.

==== Rushing ====
Name	GP-GS	Att	Gain	Loss	Net	Avg	TD	Long	Avg/G
Curtis Brinkley	12–11	237	1193	29	1164	4.9	7	45	97.0
Doug Hogue	11–2	35	232	0	232	6.6	2	82*	21.1
Antwon Bailey	8–0	33	227	6	221	6.7	2	39	27.6
Delone Carter	4–0	23	141	4	137	6.0	0	32	34.2
Tony Fiammetta	12–10	5	66	0	66	13.2	0	58	5.5
Rob Long	12–0	1	24	0	24	24.0	0	24	2.0
Andrew Robinson	4–1	12	35	28	7	0.6	0	9	1.8
Cam Dantley	11–11	41	98	154	-56	-1.4	0	20	-5.1
Total	12	392	2018	234	1784	4.6	11	82	148.7
Opponents	12	454	2504	231	2273	5.0	18	92	189.4

==== Passing ====
Name	GP-GS	Effic	Att-Cmp-Int	Pct	Yds	TD	Lng	Avg/G
Cam Dantley	11–11	102.12	121–251–5	48.2	1298	11	38	118.0
Andrew Robinson	4–1	51.31	18–45–3	40.0	132	0	18	33.0
Total	12	94.91	141–299–8	47.2	1458	11	38	121.5
Opponents	12	141.14	242–384–8	63.0	2701	27	55	225.1

==== Receiving ====
Note: This is not a complete list.

Name	GP-GS	No.	Yds	Avg	TD	Long	Avg/G
Donte Davis	12–10	29	312	10.8	2	34	26.0
Mike Owen	12–11	19	175	9.2	2	32	14.6
Tony Fiammetta	12–10	16	127	7.9	1	19	10.6
Marcus Sales	11–0	14	160	11.4	1	28	14.5
Curtis Brinkley	12–11	14	81	5.8	0	17	6.8
Lavar Lobdell	12–10	13	165	12.7	0	26	13.8
Doug Hogue	11–2	11	108	9.8	1	37	9.8
Da'Mon Merkerson	12–0	6	95	15.8	1	38	7.9
Nick Provo	7–0	4	70	17.5	1	27	10.0
Van Chew	12–0	4	56	14.0	1	36	4.7
Chaz Cervino	11–1	3	37	12.3	0	23	3.4
Dan Sheeran	2–0	2	31	15.5	1	25	15.5
Grant Mayes	10–2	1	26	26.0	0	26	2.6
Total	12	141	1458	10.3	11	38	121.5
Opponents	12	242	2701	11.2	27	55	225.1

=== Defensive Leaders ===
Note: This list includes only defensive leaders. Click 2009 Football Statistics (0-2) for a complete list.

Name	GP-GS	Tackles				Sacks	Pass defense		Interceptions				Fumbles		Blkd Kick
Name	GP-GS	Solo	Ast	Total	TFL-Yds	No-Yds	BrUp	QBH	No.-Yds	Avg	TD	Long	Rcv-Yds	FF	Blkd Kick
Jake Flaherty	12–12	44	37	81	4.0–9	1.0–5	1	4	1–2	2	0	2	–	1	–
Derrell Smith	12–12	36	37	73	5.0–23	1.0–9	2	1	1–4	4	0	4	–	1	–
Mike Mele	4–4	10	16	26	–	–	–	–	–	–	–	–	–	–	–
Mike Holmes	4–4	16	5	21	–	–	1	–	–	–	–	–	–	1	–
Derrell Smith	4–4	9	12	21	1.5–6	–	1	–	1–4	4.0	0	4	–	1	–
A.J. Brown	4–2	9	7	16	–	–	–	–	1–1	1.0	0	1	–	–	–
Art Jones	4–4	6	7	13	4.0–17	1.0–7	1	–	–	–	–	–	1–0	–	–
Randy McKinnon	3–3	8	5	13	1.5–4	–	1	–	1–0	0.0	0	0	–	–	–
Bruce Williams	4–3	8	4	12	0.5–1	–	–	–	1–9	9.0	0	9	1–0	1	–
Nick Santiago	4–4	5	4	9	2.5–8	1.5–7	–	1	–	–	–	–	–	1	–
Anthony Perkins	4–0	6	3	9	2.5–16	1.0–10	2	1	–	–	–	–	1–0	–	–
Total	4	161	136	297	19–69	4–25	8	3	4–14	3.5	0	9	4–4	5	0
Opponents	4	148	108	256	12–57	5–34	8	6	3–26	8.7	1	–	3–0	4	0

=== Special teams ===
Name	Punting								Kickoffs				
Name	No.	Yds	Avg	Long	TB	FC	I20	Blkd	No.	Yds	Avg	TB	OB
Rob Long	66	2898	43.9	72	5	16	15	0	1	43	43.0	0	1
Nico Rechul	–	–	–	–	–	–	–	–	50	3255	65.1	3	0
Patrick Shadle	–	–	–	–	–	–	–	–	1	40	40.0	0	0
Total	66	2898	43.9	72	5	16	15	0	52	3338	64.2	3	1
Opponents	48	1857	38.7	59	2	22	26	2	76	4745	62.4	2	1

Name	Punt returns					Kick returns				
Name	No.	Yds	Avg	TD	Long	No.	Yds	Avg	TD	Long
Mike Holmes	–	–	–	–	–	41	941	23.0	1	90
Max Suter	1	9	9.0	0	9	26	547	21.0	0	38
Ryan Howard	7	5	0.7	0	4	2	55	27.5	0	29
Bruce Williams	2	12	6.0	0	12	–	–	–	–	–
Total	11	49	4.5	2	12	73	1609	22.0	1	90
Opponents	31	328	10.6	1	69	47	1171	24.9	0	69
