= 2008 Rutgers Scarlet Knights football team =

American college football season

2008 Rutgers Scarlet Knights football
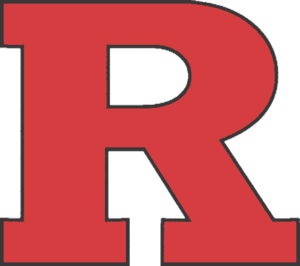

PapaJohns.com Bowl champion

PapaJohns.com Bowl, W 29–23 vs. NC State
- Conference: Big East Conference
- Record: 8–5 (5–2 Big East)
- Head coach: Greg Schiano (8th season)
- Offensive coordinator: John McNulty (3rd season)
- Offensive scheme: Pro-style
- Base defense: 4–3
- Home stadium: Rutgers Stadium

2008 Big East Conference football standings
	Conf.			Overall
Team	W		L	W		L
No. 17 Cincinnati $	6	–	1	11	–	3
Pittsburgh	5	–	2	9	–	4
No. 23 West Virginia	5	–	2	9	–	4
Rutgers	5	–	2	8	–	5
Connecticut	3	–	4	8	–	5
South Florida	2	–	5	8	–	5
Louisville	1	–	6	5	–	7
Syracuse	1	–	6	3	–	9
$ – BCS representative as conference champion; Rankings from AP Poll

The 2008 Rutgers Scarlet Knights football team represented Rutgers University in the 2008 NCAA Division I FBS football season. Their head coach was Greg Schiano and they played their home games at Rutgers Stadium in Piscataway, New Jersey. The Scarlet Knights finished the season 8–5, 5–2 in Big East play and won the PapaJohns.com Bowl, 29–23, over NC State.

After losing star halfback Ray Rice to the NFL Draft, Rutgers faced a rebuilding season. Senior Mike Teel was forced to step up his game at quarterback without being able to rely on Rice so frequently. Rutgers started off very slowly, dropping 5 of the first 6 games, including two to Big East rivals West Virginia and Cincinnati. With dreams of a Big East championship now completely eroded, Rutgers now had to recover to try to at least secure a fourth consecutive bowl berth. Starting with a 12–10 win against Connecticut on homecoming weekend, Rutgers never lost another game. The next week, they posted an impressive 54–34 win over #17 Pittsburgh. They won their next four games, finishing the season 7–5 with a solid 5–2 conference record. Rutgers earned a bowl berth in the PapaJohns.com Bowl, and they won a close game against NC State for their third consecutive bowl win.

== Schedule ==
Date	Time	Opponent	Site	TV	Result	Attendance
September 1	4:00 pm	Fresno State*	Rutgers Stadium; Piscataway, NJ	ESPN	L 7–24	42,508
September 11	7:45 pm	North Carolina*	Rutgers Stadium; Piscataway, NJ	ESPN	L 12–44	42,502
September 20	3:30 pm	at Navy*	Navy–Marine Corps Memorial Stadium; Annapolis, MD	CBSCS	L 21–23	37,821
September 27	3:30 pm	Morgan State*	Rutgers Stadium; Piscataway, NJ	SNY	W 38–0	42,411
October 4	12:00 pm	at West Virginia	Milan Puskar Stadium; Morgantown, WV	SNY	L 17–24	59,122
October 11	12:00 pm	at Cincinnati	Nippert Stadium; Cincinnati, OH	SNY	L 10–13	32,370
October 18	12:00 pm	Connecticut^{†}	Rutgers Stadium; Piscataway, NJ	ESPNU	W 12–10	42,491
October 25	3:30 pm	at No. 17 Pittsburgh	Heinz Field; Pittsburgh, PA	ESPN360	W 54–34	51,161
November 8	12:00 pm	Syracuse	Rutgers Stadium; Piscataway, NJ	ESPNU	W 35–17	42,172
November 15	12:00 pm	at South Florida	Raymond James Stadium; Tampa, FL	SNY	W 49–16	47,216
November 22	12:00 pm	Army*	Rutgers Stadium; Piscataway, NJ	SNY	W 30–3	42,212
December 4	7:45 pm	Louisville	Rutgers Stadium; Piscataway, NJ	ESPN	W 63–14	42,347
December 29	3:00 pm	vs. NC State*	Legion Field; Birmingham, AL (PapaJohns.com Bowl)	ESPN	W 29–23	38,582
*Non-conference game; ^{†}Homecoming; Rankings from AP Poll released prior to the game; All times are in Eastern time
