= 2009 North Carolina Tar Heels football team =

American college football season

2009 North Carolina Tar Heels football

Meineke Car Care Bowl, L 17–19 vs. Pittsburgh
- Conference: Atlantic Coast Conference
- Coastal Division
- Record: 0–5, 8 wins vacated (0–4 ACC, 4 wins vacated)
- Head coach: Butch Davis (3rd season)
- Offensive coordinator: John Shoop (3rd season)
- Offensive scheme: Pro-style
- Defensive coordinator: Everett Withers (2nd season)
- Base defense: 4–3
- Captains: Jordan Hemby; Kyle Jolly; Quan Sturdivant; Cam Thomas; Kennedy Tinsley; E. J. Wilson; T. J. Yates
- Home stadium: Kenan Memorial Stadium

2009 Atlantic Coast Conference football standings
	Conf.			Overall
Team	W		L	W		L
Atlantic Division
No. 24 Clemson x	6	–	2	9	–	5
Boston College	5	–	3	8	–	5
Florida State	4	–	4	7	–	6
Wake Forest	3	–	5	5	–	7
NC State	2	–	6	5	–	7
Maryland	1	–	7	2	–	10
Coastal Division
No. 13 Georgia Tech * x$	7	–	1	11	–	3
No. 10 Virginia Tech	6	–	2	10	–	3
No. 19 Miami (FL)	5	–	3	9	–	4
North Carolina *	0	–	4	0	–	5
Duke	3	–	5	5	–	7
Virginia	2	–	6	3	–	9
Championship: Georgia Tech 39, Clemson 34
$ – BCS representative as conference champion; North Carolina vacated 8 wins, including 4 ACC wins.; Rankings from AP Poll

The 2009 North Carolina Tar Heels football team represented the University of North Carolina at Chapel Hill as a member of Coastal Division of the Atlantic Coast Conference (ACC) during the 2009 NCAA Division I FBS football season. Led by third-year head coach Butch Davis, the Tar Heels played their home games at Kenan Memorial Stadium in Chapel Hill, North Carolina. North Carolina finished the season 8–5 overall and 4–4 in ACC play to place fourth in the Coastal Division. The Tar Heels lost to Pittsburgh in the Meineke Car Care Bowl. In 2011, North Carolina vacated all its wins from the 2008 season and 2009 seasons.

== Preseason ==
=== Key losses ===
On January 5, 2009 starting wide-receiver Hakeem Nicks announced that he would forgo his senior year in order to enter the 2009 NFL draft. In just three years Nicks had set 14 school records, including career receptions (181), career receiving yards (2,580), and career touchdowns (21). In his senior season, Nicks was named first-team All-Atlantic Coast Conference after catching 68 passes for 1,222 yards and 12 touchdowns. He was the only player in UNC history with more than 1,000 yards receiving in a season.

The following are some of the other key players who will no longer play for North Carolina in the 2009 season:

Offense

- James "Cooter" Arnold (WR)
- Bryon Bishop (OG)
- Calvin Darity (OG)
- Brooks Foster (WR)
- Hakeem Nicks (WR)
- Richard Quinn (TE)
- Garrett Reynolds (OT)
- Brandon Tate (WR)

Defense

- Trimane Goddard (S)
- Mark Paschal (LB)
- Chase Rice (LB)

Special teams:

- Terrence Brown (P)

=== Key returns ===
For 2009, the Tar Heels are likely to return numerous starters from the previous season. The following players will maintain their playing eligibility and in all likelihood will return for the season:

Offense

- T. J. Yates (QB), returning leader in passing touchdowns (11)
- Shaun Draughn (RB), returning leader in rushing yards (866)
- Greg Little (WR), returning leader in passing yards (146)

Defense

- Kendric Burney (CB), returning leader in interceptions (3)
- Deunta Williams (S), returning leader in interceptions (3)
- Quan Sturdivant (LB), returning leader in total tackles (122)
- Bruce Carter (LB), returning leader in sacks (5) and tackles for loss (11)

Special teams:

- Casey Barth (K), returning leader in field goals made (10)
- Jay Wooten (K), returning leader in kick-offs (71)

== Recruiting ==
As of February 6, 2009, Scout.com rated North Carolina's 2009 recruiting class as 5th in the nation, Rivals.com ranked North Carolina's recruiting class as 6th, and ESPN ranked 12th. Joshua Adams (WR) and Kevin Reddick (LB) plan to enroll in January 2009 and do not count against the limit of 25 recruits per year. The other following players have offered North Carolina non-binding verbal commitments. These pledges can become binding when recruits sign their National Letters of Intent on February 4, 2009.

College recruiting information (2009)
Name	Hometown	School	Height	Weight	40^{‡}	Commit date
Joshua Adams; WR	Cheshire, CT	Cheshire Academy	6 ft 4 in (1.93 m)	200 lb (91 kg)	4.5	Feb 7, 2008
Joshua Adams; WR	Recruit ratings: Scout: Rivals: (78)					
Hawatha Bell; LB	Matthews, NC	David W. Butler HS	6 ft 1 in (1.85 m)	230 lb (100 kg)	4.49	Nov 22, 2008
Hawatha Bell; LB	Recruit ratings: Scout: Rivals: (78)					
A.J. Blue; ATH	Dallas, NC	Hargrave Military Academy	6 ft 2 in (1.88 m)	205 lb (93 kg)	4.6	Aug 9, 2008
A.J. Blue; ATH	Recruit ratings: Scout: Rivals: (75)					
Travis Bond; OL	Windsor, NC	Bertie HS	6 ft 7 in (2.01 m)	320 lb (150 kg)	5.2	Jan 19, 2009
Travis Bond; OL	Recruit ratings: Scout: Rivals: (80)					
Jheranie Boyd; WR	Gastonia, NC	Ashbrook HS	6 ft 2 in (1.88 m)	185 lb (84 kg)	4.43	Nov 6, 2008
Jheranie Boyd; WR	Recruit ratings: Scout: Rivals: (83)					
Prizell Brown; TE	Brenham, TX	Blinn College	6 ft 4 in (1.93 m)	259 lb (117 kg)	4.65	Nov 25, 2008
Prizell Brown; TE	Recruit ratings: Scout: Rivals: (N/A)					
D.J. Bunn; DB	Smithfield, NC	Smithfield-Selma HS	5 ft 11 in (1.80 m)	190 lb (86 kg)	4.63	Feb 16, 2008
D.J. Bunn; DB	Recruit ratings: Scout: Rivals: (75)					
Curtis Campbell; DB	Chesapeake, VA	Grassfield HS	6 ft 2 in (1.88 m)	205 lb (93 kg)	4.47	Jul 31, 2008
Curtis Campbell; DB	Recruit ratings: Scout: Rivals: (77)					
David Collins; OL	Kernersville, NC	East Forsyth HS	6 ft 7 in (2.01 m)	290 lb (130 kg)	5.3	Mar 6, 2008
David Collins; OL	Recruit ratings: Scout: Rivals: (69)					
Ray Ray Davis; WR	Monroe, NC	Sun Valley HS	6 ft 0 in (1.83 m)	197 lb (89 kg)	4.6	Feb 16, 2008
Ray Ray Davis; WR	Recruit ratings: Scout: Rivals: (77)					
Justin Dixon; LB	Smithfield, NC	Smithfield-Selma HS	6 ft 1 in (1.85 m)	230 lb (100 kg)	4.5	Feb 16, 2008
Justin Dixon; LB	Recruit ratings: Scout: Rivals: (78)					
Johnnie Farms; OL	Perry, GA	Perry HS	6 ft 2 in (1.88 m)	306 lb (139 kg)	5.2	Nov 23, 2008
Johnnie Farms; OL	Recruit ratings: Scout: Rivals: (78)					
C.J. Feagles; P	Ridgewood, NJ	Ridgewood HS	5 ft 11 in (1.80 m)	180 lb (82 kg)	N/A	Jun 27, 2008
C.J. Feagles; P	Recruit ratings: Scout: Rivals: (40)					
Hunter Furr; ATH	Lewisville, NC	Mount Tabor HS	6 ft 0 in (1.83 m)	204 lb (93 kg)	4.4	Feb 16, 2008
Hunter Furr; ATH	Recruit ratings: Scout: Rivals: (76)					
Angelo Hadley; DB	Seffner, FL	Armwood HS	5 ft 11 in (1.80 m)	190 lb (86 kg)	4.5	Dec 18, 2008
Angelo Hadley; DB	Recruit ratings: Scout: Rivals: (74)					
Erik Highsmith; WR	Vanceboro, NC	West Craven HS	6 ft 2 in (1.88 m)	170 lb (77 kg)	4.45	Oct 22, 2008
Erik Highsmith; WR	Recruit ratings: Scout: Rivals: (75)					
Josh Hunter; DB	Charlotte, NC	Mallard Creek HS	6 ft 1 in (1.85 m)	175 lb (79 kg)	4.4	Oct 9, 2008
Josh Hunter; DB	Recruit ratings: Scout: Rivals: (78)					
Mywan Jackson; DB	Seffner, FL	Armwood HS	5 ft 11 in (1.80 m)	170 lb (77 kg)	4.5	Jan 8, 2008
Mywan Jackson; DB	Recruit ratings: Scout: Rivals: (74)					
Jared McAdoo; DT	Chapel Hill, NC	Chapel Hill HS	6 ft 2 in (1.88 m)	290 lb (130 kg)	5.06	Mar 3, 2008
Jared McAdoo; DT	Recruit ratings: Scout: Rivals: (80)					
Josh McKie; ATH	Mauldin, SC	Mauldin HS	6 ft 0 in (1.83 m)	180 lb (82 kg)	4.5	Feb 17, 2008
Josh McKie; ATH	Recruit ratings: Scout: Rivals: (76)					
Donte Paige-Moss; DE	Jacksonville, NC	Northside HS	6 ft 4 in (1.93 m)	235 lb (107 kg)	4.58	Mar 10, 2008
Donte Paige-Moss; DE	Recruit ratings: Scout: Rivals: (82)					
Shane Mularkey; LB	Norcross, GA	Greater Atlanta CS	6 ft 2 in (1.88 m)	210 lb (95 kg)	–	Jul 7, 2008
Shane Mularkey; LB	Recruit ratings: Scout: Rivals: (73)					
Kevin Reddick; LB	New Bern, NC	Hargrave Military Academy	6 ft 2 in (1.88 m)	230 lb (100 kg)	4.65	Aug 9, 2008
Kevin Reddick; LB	Recruit ratings: Scout: Rivals: (78)					
Bryn Renner; QB	West Springfield, VA	West Springfield HS	6 ft 3 in (1.91 m)	185 lb (84 kg)	4.75	Mar 26, 2008
Bryn Renner; QB	Recruit ratings: Scout: Rivals: (81)					
Jerrell Rhodes; RB	Durham, NC	CE Jordan HS	5 ft 9 in (1.75 m)	195 lb (88 kg)	4.48	Sep 29, 2008
Jerrell Rhodes; RB	Recruit ratings: Scout: Rivals: (77)					
Gene Robinson; DB	Memphis, TN	Whitehaven HS	5 ft 10 in (1.78 m)	170 lb (77 kg)	4.5	Jan 19, 2009
Gene Robinson; DB	Recruit ratings: Scout: Rivals: (80)					
Terry Shankle; DB	Norwood, NC	South Stanly HS	5 ft 10 in (1.78 m)	170 lb (77 kg)	4.43	Nov 24, 2008
Terry Shankle; DB	Recruit ratings: Scout: Rivals: (79)					
Donavan Tate; ATH	Cartersville, GA	Cartersville HS	6 ft 2 in (1.88 m)	200 lb (91 kg)	4.5	Dec 3, 2008
Donavan Tate; ATH	Recruit ratings: Scout: Rivals: (82)					
Brennan Williams; OL	West Roxbury, MA	Catholic Memorial	6 ft 6 in (1.98 m)	275 lb (125 kg)	4.97	Jan 3, 2009
Brennan Williams; OL	Recruit ratings: Scout: Rivals: (77)					
Overall recruit ranking: Scout: 5 Rivals: 6
‡ Refers to 40-yard dash; Note: In many cases, Scout, Rivals, 247Sports, On3, and ESPN may conflict in their listings of height, weight and 40 time.; In these cases, the average was taken. ESPN grades are on a 100-point scale.; Sources: "North Carolina Commit List for 2009". Rivals.; "RecruitTracker 2008: North Carolina". ESPN.; "2009 Team Ranking". Rivals.com.

== Coaching staff ==
Name	Position	Seasons in Position
Butch Davis	Head coach	3rd
John Blake	Associate head coach / recruiting coordinator / defensive line	3rd
Ken Browning	Running backs	16th
Jeff Connors	Strength and conditioning coordinator	9th
Steve Hagen	Tight Ends	3rd
John Lovett	Special teams coordinator / Defensive Assistant	3rd
Sam Pittman	Offensive Line	3rd
John Shoop	Offensive coordinator / quarterbacks	3rd
Tommy Thigpen	Linebackers	5th
Charlie Williams	Wide Receivers	3rd
Everett Withers	Defensive coordinator / defensive backs	2nd

== Roster ==
Wide Receiver: 3 Joshua Adams – Freshman; 8 Greg Little – Junior; 11 Joshua McKie – Freshman; 34 Johnny White – Junior; 25 Lee Browne – Freshman; 81 Quentin Plair – Junior; 82 Todd Harrelson – (redshirt) Freshman; 83 Dwight Jones – Sophomore; 85 Rashad Mason – Sophomore; 87 Jheranie Boyd – Freshman; 88 Erik Highsmith – Freshman; 1 Mar'vese Lanier – Junior; Offensive lineman: 55 Trey Strickland – Sophomore; 62 David Collins – Freshman; 64 Jonathan Cooper – (redshirt) Freshman; 65 Cam Holland – Sophomore; 66 Mike Ingersoll – Junior; 67 Greg Elleby – Junior; 69 Lowell Dyer – Senior; 70 Alan Pelc – Junior; 71 Carl Gaskins – Sophomore; 72 Kyle Jolly – Senior; 74 Sam Ellis – Junior; 76 Travis Bond – Freshman; 78 Kevin Bryant – Sophomore; 79 Brennan Williams – Freshman; H-back: 33 Christian Wilson – Sophomore; Tight End: 17 Zack Pianalto – Junior; 80 Ed Barham – Junior; 84 Vince Jacobs – Junior; 86 Randy White – (redshirt) Freshman; 95 Nelson Hurst – Sophomore	Quarterback: 2 Bryn Renner – Freshman; 7 Mike Paulus – Sophomore; 13 T. J. Yates – Sophomore; 14 Braden Hanson – Freshman; Running Back: 5 Jamal Womble – (redshirt) Freshman; 23 Steven Hatley – Sophomore; 30 Carter Brown Sophomore; 40 Hunter Furr – Freshman; 45 Devon Ramsay – Sophomore; Tailback: 6 Anthony Elzy – Junior; 20 Shaun Draughn – Junior; 32 Ryan Houston – Junior; Fullback: 4 Bobby Rome – Senior; 43 Curtis Byrd – Junior; Defensive tackle: 9 Marvin Austin – Junior; 91 Tydreke Powell – Sophomore; 93 Cam Thomas – Senior; 96 Tavares Brown – Senior; 97 Aleric Mullins – Senior; Defensive End: 42 Robert Quinn – Sophomore; 75 Jared McAdoo – Freshman; 78 Jordan Nix – Sophomore; 86 Adam Curry – Sophomore; 90 Quinton Coples – Sophomore; 92 E. J. Wilson – Senior; 94 Michael McAdoo – Sophomore; 98 Donte Paige-Moss – Freshman; Cornerback: 10 Melvin Williams – Senior; 12 Charles Brown – Junior; 16 Kendric Burney – Junior; 23 Jordan Hemby – Senior; 29 Brian Gupton – Sophomore; 37 LeCount Fantroy – Sophomore	Linebacker: 33 Hayden Hunter – Junior; 35 Herman Davidson – Sophomore; 36 Kennedy Tinsley – Senior; 45 Josh Bridges – Sophomore; 47 Zach Brown – Sophomore; 48 Kevin Reddick – Freshman; 49 Ryan Taylor – Senior; 51 Brian Roberts – Sophomore; 52 Quan Sturdivant – Junior; 53 Hawatha Bell – Freshman; 54 Bruce Carter – Junior; 55 Linwan Euwell – Sophomore; 57 Dion Guy – (redshirt) Freshman; 58 Ebele Okakpu – Sophomore; Safety: 7 Josh Stewart – Junior; 21 Da'Norris Searcy – Junior; 25 Matt Merletti – Junior; 27 Deunta Williams – Junior; 28 Jonathan Smith – Junior; 32 Tyler Caldwell – Senior; Deep Snapper: 51 Trevor Stuart – Junior; 61 Mark House – Junior; Punter / Place Kicker: 11 Casey Barth – Sophomore; 30 C.J. Feagles – Freshman; 39 Grant Schallock – Junior; 44 Trase Jones – Junior

== Schedule ==
Date	Time	Opponent	Rank	Site	TV	Result	Attendance	Source
September 5	6:00 p.m.	The Citadel*	No. 21	Kenan Memorial Stadium; Chapel Hill, NC	ESPN360	W 40–6 (vacated)	58,500	
September 12	12:00 p.m.	at Connecticut*	No. 19	Rentschler Field; East Hartford, CT	ESPNU	W 12–10 (vacated)	38,087	
September 19	12:00 p.m.	East Carolina*	No. 24	Kenan Memorial Stadium; Chapel Hill, NC	ESPN2	W 31–17 (vacated)	58,000	
September 26	12:00 p.m.	at Georgia Tech	No. 22	Bobby Dodd Stadium; Atlanta, GA	Raycom	L 7–24	50,114	
October 3	12:00 p.m.	Virginia		Kenan Memorial Stadium; Chapel Hill, NC (South's Oldest Rivalry)	Raycom	L 3–16	57,500	
October 10	3:30 p.m.	Georgia Southern*		Kenan Memorial Stadium; Chapel Hill, NC	ESPN360	W 42–12 (vacated)	47,000	
October 22	8:00 p.m.	Florida State		Kenan Memorial Stadium; Chapel Hill, NC	ESPN	L 27–30	58,000	
October 29	7:30 p.m.	at No. 14 Virginia Tech		Lane Stadium; Blacksburg, VA	ESPN	W 20–17 (vacated)	66,233	
November 7	3:30 p.m.	Duke		Kenan Memorial Stadium; Chapel Hill, NC (Victory Bell)	ESPNU	W 19–6 (vacated)	59,750	
November 14	3:30 p.m.	No. 12 Miami (FL)		Kenan Memorial Stadium; Chapel Hill, NC	ABC/ESPN	W 33–24 (vacated)	57,500	
November 21	12:00 p.m.	at Boston College		Alumni Stadium; Chestnut Hill, MA	ESPN2	W 31–13 (vacated)	41,272	
November 28	12:00 p.m.	at NC State	No. 23	Carter–Finley Stadium; Raleigh, NC (rivalry)	ESPN2	L 27–28	57,583	
December 26	4:30 p.m.	vs. No. 17 Pittsburgh*		Bank of America Stadium; Charlotte, NC (Meineke Car Care Bowl)	ESPN	L 17–19	50,389	
*Non-conference game; Rankings from AP Poll released prior to the game; All times are in Eastern time

== Game summaries ==
=== The Citadel ===
	1	2	3	4	Total
The Citadel	0	0	0	6	6
#20 North Carolina	0	23	7	10	40

North Carolina had its best rushing game under coach Butch Davis with 260 total rushing yards (its most since 2004), and Shaun Draughn rushing for 118 yards, his fourth 100-yard rushing game. T. J. Yates threw two touchdown passes and threw for 114 yards.

=== UConn ===
	1	2	3	4	Total
#19 North Carolina	0	0	0	12	12
UConn	0	3	7	0	10

North Carolina managed to come back by scoring 12 points against Connecticut in the fourth quarter to win the game. North Carolina gained its final two points when Connecticut's senior tackle Dan Ryan was flagged for holding North Carolina's end Robert Quinn in the end zone, which gave North Carolina a safety, with 1:32 left in the fourth quarter.

=== ECU ===
	1	2	3	4	Total
East Carolina	7	7	0	3	17
#19 North Carolina	7	14	3	7	31

=== Georgia Tech ===
	1	2	3	4	Total
#18 North Carolina	0	0	0	7	7
Georgia Tech	7	3	0	14	24

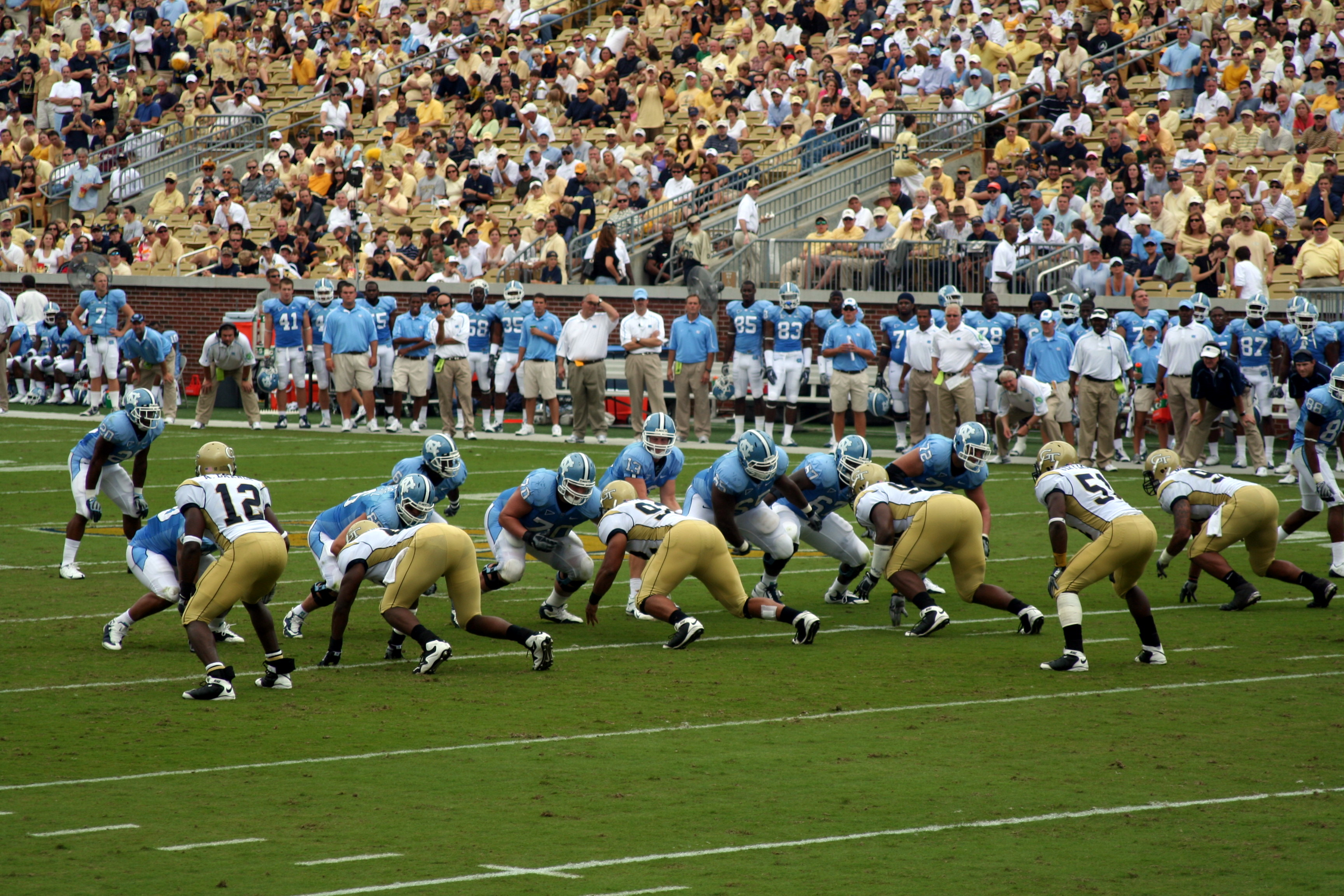

=== Virginia ===
	1	2	3	4	Total
Virginia	0	6	3	7	16
North Carolina	0	0	3	0	3

=== Georgia Southern ===
	1	2	3	4	Total
Georgia Southern	7	0	3	2	12
North Carolina	14	28	0	0	42

=== Florida State ===
	1	2	3	4	Total
Florida State	3	3	14	10	30
North Carolina	14	3	7	3	27

=== Virginia Tech ===
	1	2	3	4	Total
North Carolina	0	7	7	6	20
#14 Virginia Tech	0	0	7	10	17

=== Duke ===
	1	2	3	4	Total
Duke	3	3	0	0	6
North Carolina	3	3	3	10	19

=== Miami ===
	1	2	3	4	Total
#14 Miami	0	7	10	7	24
North Carolina	0	20	3	10	33

Miami and North Carolina last met at Miami on September 27, 2008 in a game won by UNC 28–24. Miami is 5–7 all time versus UNC.

=== Boston College ===
	1	2	3	4	Total
North Carolina	21	0	0	10	31
Boston College	3	10	0	0	13

The Tar Heels defeated a Boston College team that was playing for an outside shot at a trip to the ACC Championship Game. The UNC defense stifled the Eagles offense for much of the game, holding them to 0 conversions on 13 3rd down attempts. Freshman Boston College quarterback David Shinskie threw for more yards to the Tar Heels defenders than to his own team. His four interceptions were returned for a total of 133 yards, while his twelve completions gained only 101 yards. Tar Heels DB Kendric Burney's interception return for a touchdown was his second in as many games. Cam Thomas added another defensive touchdown on a fumble return. UNC's offense had four turnovers of their own (3 T. J. Yates interceptions, 1 fumble by Erik Highsmith), and struggled to move the ball for much of the game. The UNC running attack was slowed due to a lower extremity injury to Ryan Houston who was sidelined for most of the second half. However, he did return for a 1-yard touchdown run. UNC's stout defense once again came up with big plays in the Tar Heel's fourth straight win.

=== North Carolina State ===
	1	2	3	4	Total
North Carolina	3	21	3	0	27
North Carolina State	0	14	7	7	28

=== Pittsburgh–Meineke Car Care Bowl ===
	1	2	3	4	Total
Pittsburgh	0	13	3	3	19
North Carolina	7	3	7	0	17

== Rankings ==
Ranking movements Legend: ██ Increase in ranking ██ Decrease in ranking — = Not ranked RV = Received votes
	Week															
Poll	Pre	1	2	3	4	5	6	7	8	9	10	11	12	13	14	Final
AP	21	19	24	22	RV	—	—	—	—	—	—	RV	23	RV	RV	—
Coaches	20	19	19	18	RV	—	RV	RV	—	RV	RV	25	24	RV	RV	—
Harris	Not released				RV	—	—	—	—	RV	RV	RV	RV	RV	RV	Not released
BCS	Not released							—	—	—	—	—	24	—	—	Not released
