= Butch Davis =

American football player and coach (born 1951)

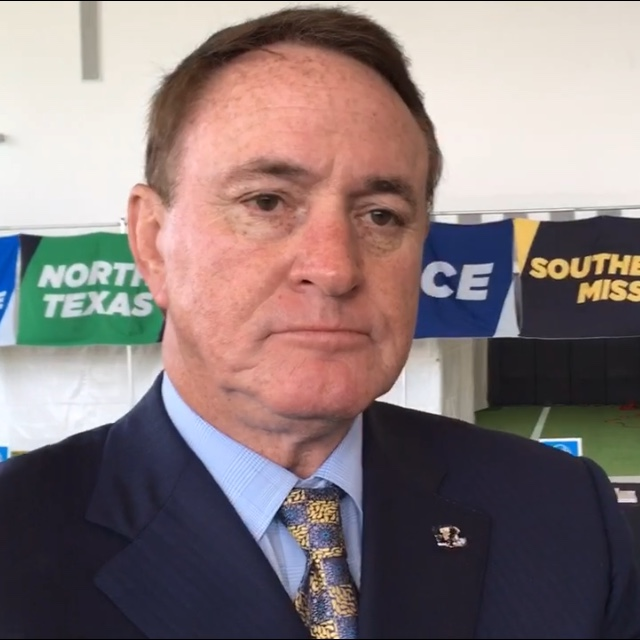
- Davis at 2018 C-USA Kickoff

Biographical details
- Born: November 17, 1951 (age 74); Tahlequah, Oklahoma, U.S.

Playing career
- 1970: Arkansas
- Position: Defensive end

Coaching career (HC unless noted)
- 1973: Fayetteville HS (AR) (DC)
- 1974–1975: Pawhuska HS (OK) (DC)
- 1976–1977: Charles Page HS (OK) (DC)
- 1978: Will Rogers HS (OK)
- 1979–1983: Oklahoma State (TE/WR)
- 1984–1988: Miami (FL) (DL)
- 1989–1992: Dallas Cowboys (DL)
- 1993–1994: Dallas Cowboys (DC)
- 1995–2000: Miami (FL)
- 2001–2004: Cleveland Browns
- 2007–2010: North Carolina
- 2017–2021: FIU

Administrative career (AD unless noted)
- 2002–2004: Cleveland Browns (GM)
- 2012–2013: Tampa Bay Buccaneers (advisor)

Head coaching record
- Overall: 87–75 (college); 24–35 (NFL)
- Bowls: 6–4

Accomplishments and honors

Championships
- 3 Big East (1995–1996, 2000)

Paul Hilton "Butch" Davis Jr. (born November 17, 1951) is an American football coach. He was most recently the head football coach at Florida International University. After graduating from the University of Arkansas, he became an assistant college football coach at Oklahoma State University and the University of Miami before becoming the defensive coordinator for the Dallas Cowboys of the National Football League (NFL). He was head coach of the University of Miami's Hurricanes football team from 1995 to 2000 and the NFL's Cleveland Browns from 2001 to 2004. Davis served as the head coach of the University of North Carolina at Chapel Hill (UNC) Tar Heels football team from 2007 until the summer of 2011, when a series of National Collegiate Athletic Association (NCAA) investigations resulted in his dismissal. He was hired by the NFL's Tampa Bay Buccaneers as an advisor in February 2012.

Davis returned to head coaching duties in 2017 when he assumed the role with Florida International University. He led the team to three consecutive bowl games from 2017 to 2019. Davis had an acrimonious exit from the position in 2021. Shortly before his contract expired, he accused the FIU administration of intentionally undermining the football program.

== Early years ==
Davis was born on November 17, 1951, in Tahlequah, Oklahoma, to Paul and Pat Davis. He attended high school at Bixby High School in Bixby, Oklahoma where he was an all-state fullback and defensive end for the Spartans football team and graduated in 1970. After graduation, he attended the University of Arkansas and played defensive end for the Razorbacks. Due to a knee injury, Davis was sidelined after his freshman year and became a student assistant for the rest of his college career. After graduation from college, he held assistant coaching positions at several high schools, including Fayetteville High School in 1973, Pawhuska High School from 1974 to 1975, and Charles Page High School in Sand Springs, Oklahoma from 1976 to 1977. He held his first head coaching job at Will Rogers High School in 1978.

In 1979, Butch began a successful 15-year association with Jimmy Johnson, first as a receivers and tight ends coach at Oklahoma State University for the Cowboys, then later as defensive line coach at the University of Miami. During that time, the 1987 Miami Hurricanes football team won the NCAA Division I-A national football championship.

== Coaching career ==
=== Dallas Cowboys ===
Davis followed Jimmy Johnson to Dallas, where Davis was promoted to defensive coordinator of the Dallas Cowboys in 1993 after the departure of Dave Wannstedt. As defensive coordinator and coach of the defensive line, he helped Johnson and new owner Jerry Jones win back-to-back Super Bowls with a Dallas Cowboys team that had gone 1–15 in 1989, Johnson's first year as head coach. After Johnson left, Davis continued at Dallas for one more year as assistant coach under Barry Switzer.

=== Miami ===
Davis was hired as the head football coach at the University of Miami in January 1995. Not long after Davis's arrival, the Hurricanes were found to have committed several violations of NCAA rules during the tenure of his predecessor, Dennis Erickson. As a result, the Hurricanes were barred from postseason play in his first year (despite an 8–3 record) and lost 31 football scholarship spots over several years. Davis earned a 51–20 record during his tenure as head coach. During Davis's final year as head coach, the Hurricanes finished 11–1, their best season since coming up one win short of the 1992 national championship. Despite finishing second in both human polls, a quirk in the Bowl Championship Series formula resulted in the Hurricanes being shut out of that year's national championship game, the 2001 Orange Bowl. The Hurricanes were passed over in favor of the Florida State Seminoles, even though the Seminoles had lost to the Hurricanes that year when a last-second field goal attempt sailed wide right. The Seminoles ultimately lost the Orange Bowl to the Oklahoma Sooners 13–2. The Hurricanes used the snub as motivation in the following season for a run to their first undisputed national championship in two decades under Davis's offensive coordinator, Larry Coker.

Ultimately, the BCS added a "quality win" bonus to its formula, which gave extra credit for beating a top-ten team. The Hurricanes earned recognition from the American Football Coaches Association for outstanding graduation rates in each of his six seasons at Miami.

Numerous professional football players were coached or recruited by Davis in his time at Miami, such as Ray Lewis, Ed Reed, Joaquin Gonzalez, Andre Johnson, Clinton Portis, Edgerrin James, Reggie Wayne and Jeremy Shockey.

=== Cleveland Browns ===
Davis became head coach of the Cleveland Browns in 2001, inheriting a team that won five games combined in the previous two years. Davis led the team to a 7–9 record in his first year, missing the playoffs by a game. In his first year, one of the most controversial refereeing moments in NFL history was Bottlegate. His defense that year forced a league leading 33 interceptions. The Browns posted a 9–7 record and got a playoff berth in Davis's second year, getting in after winning two close games in a row against the Baltimore Ravens and the Atlanta Falcons. In 2003, a quarterback controversy erupted between Tim Couch and backup Kelly Holcomb after Holcomb, starting the 2002 playoff game for the injured Couch, threw for 429 yards and three touchdowns. Davis would ultimately give the starting job to Holcomb, though Couch did start a few games. In the 2004 offseason, Davis signed Jeff Garcia and cut Couch. Davis was forced to resign in early December 2004 after a 3–8 start and ended with a 24–35 overall record as coach of the Browns. Davis was the only coach to lead the expansion Browns to the playoffs, until Kevin Stefanski would do so in the 2020 season.

=== North Carolina ===
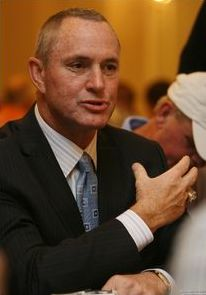
Davis at the 2007 ACC Football Kickoff

On November 13, 2006, University of North Carolina athletic director Dick Baddour announced that Davis had been hired as the school's new head football coach. On November 27, 2006, Davis officially succeeded John Bunting, who was fired in October 2006 after posting one winning season in the previous six seasons as head coach of the Tar Heels. Davis took over a program that had seen three winning seasons in the past eight years, and none since 2001. They had also only notched two winning records in Atlantic Coast Conference play since 2001.

During his first season as head coach, the 2007 Tar Heels finished 4–8. However, the Tar Heels were fairly competitive, with six of those losses coming by a touchdown or less and two coming against teams ranked in the top 15 at the time. They also remained in bowl contention well into November. Despite a losing record in 2007, North Carolina fans averaged over 57,000 fans in Kenan Stadium during the season, the highest average attendance since the Mack Brown era. The 2007 matchup against South Carolina saw a crowd of 61,000, the second-largest in school history. During the season, suspicion mounted that Davis would leave UNC after his first year if the head coaching job at his alma mater, Arkansas, opened up. The rumors grew louder when Houston Nutt was forced to resign at Arkansas, but Davis denied he was leaving. On November 21, 2007, Davis agreed to a one-year contract extension, along with a raise of about $291,000 annually. Davis said in a statement that one year at UNC convinced him that this was where he wanted to be, and that he intended to have "a long and successful career in Chapel Hill." Davis originally signed a seven-year deal worth approximately $1.86 million per season, with a base salary of $286,000. Additionally, he received $25,000 a year in expenses and a supplement from the Educational Foundation (Ram's Club) that ranged from $1 million in 2007 to $1.3 million in 2013. Baddour said he could not release all the details of the contract until it was approved by the school's board of trustees, but did say the base salary would rise $29,000, the expenses would go up $5,000, and Davis's supplemental income would go up $100,000.

==== 2008 ====
The 2008 North Carolina Tar Heels football team were expected to be much improved from the previous year, with most outlets picking them to finish second in the Coastal Division. On October 4, the Heels defeated the then 24th-ranked Connecticut Huskies 38–12 for their first victory over a ranked non-conference opponent in 11 years. As a result, the Tar Heels were ranked 22nd in the weekly Associated Press rankings, their first appearance in a major poll in seven years. The following Saturday, the Tar Heels defeated the Notre Dame Fighting Irish, their first regular-season win as a ranked team in 11 years. A crowd of 60,500, third-largest in school history, watched the Tar Heels play the Fighting Irish. A 16–13 overtime loss at Virginia on October 18 briefly knocked the Heels out of the rankings, but after a 45–24 victory over Boston College on October 25, the team became bowl-eligible for the first time since 2004. The win also resulted in the team being ranked in the Bowl Championship Series rankings for the first time since the BCS began in 1998. A week later, they defeated Georgia Tech to clinch their first winning season since 2001, and only their fourth since Brown left the school after the 1997 season. The Tar Heels lost three of their last four games, including a loss in the Meineke Car Care Bowl to West Virginia.

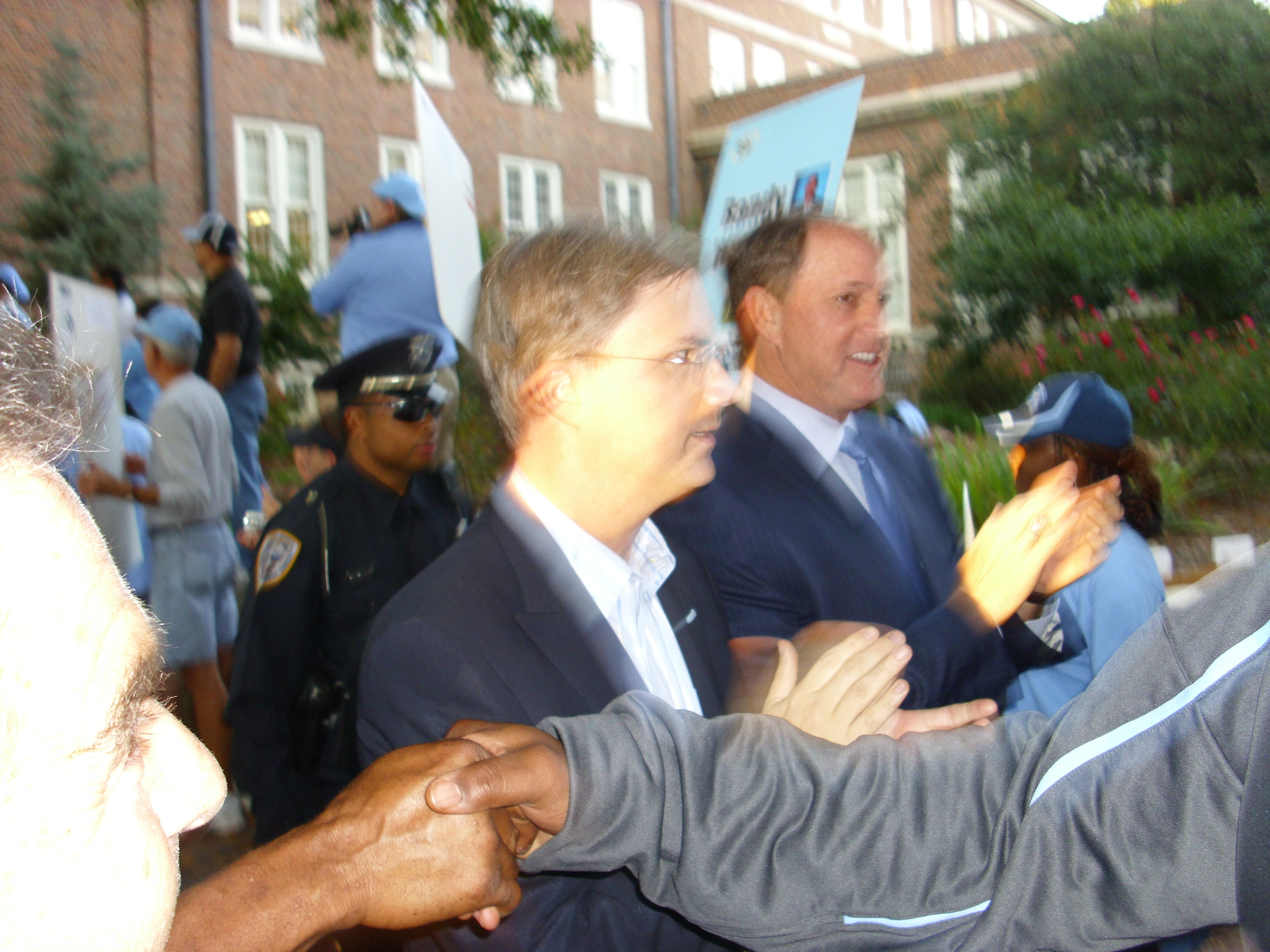
Davis coming through campus before UNC's game against Florida State in 2009

==== 2009 ====
Davis led the 2009 Tar Heels to another 8–4 regular season record and a second straight bowl appearance, the first time since the 1997–1998 seasons that UNC had made consecutive bowl appearances. A loss to North Carolina State in the final game of the season sent them back to the Meineke Car Care Bowl. UNC faced the Pittsburgh Panthers on December 26, 2009, and lost for the second straight year, giving UNC another 8–5 final record. Additionally, Davis led Carolina football to its 6th consecutive year of graduating more than 75% of its football players. The American Football Coaches Association recognized fewer than 30 public universities for superior graduation rates in 2009, with UNC the only such institution in the state of North Carolina and the Atlantic Coast Conference.

==== Academic misconduct ====
In July 2010, the NCAA began investigating violations involving improper benefits provided by agents to current players at UNC. In September 2010, the NCAA opened a second prong of its investigation, this time involving possible improper tutor involvement with UNC student-athletes. In response to the investigation, local and national sports columnists called for Davis's termination, but some North Carolina fans still supported the coach. A survey of UNC fans reflected strong support for Davis despite the ongoing investigation. Thirteen UNC football players were suspended for the team's season opener in Atlanta against the Louisiana State University Tigers, and the Tar Heels lost the game 30–24. The Tar Heels later lost to ACC rivals Miami, Georgia Tech, Virginia Tech, and NC State, but won their first game since 1981 in Virginia's Scott Stadium and gained their first win ever in FSU's Doak Campbell Stadium. In October 2010, wide receiver Greg Little, defensive tackle Marvin Austin, and defensive end Robert Quinn were ruled permanently ineligible after it was discovered they improperly accepted gifts from sports agents. Five other players were found guilty of accepting improper benefits and/or inappropriate academic assistance. On July 27, 2011, Davis was fired by UNC chancellor Holden Thorp amid an NCAA investigation of academic misconduct and allegations players receiving improper benefits from agents. Thorp said the move was necessary to restore confidence in UNC's integrity. On September 19, 2011, in response to an NCAA notice of allegations, Davis was never mentioned in the NCAA inquiry and had no involvement in the investigation.

North Carolina subsequently vacated all of its wins from the 2008 and 2009 seasons after retroactively declaring Austin, Quinn and Little ineligible. As a result, these are "officially" North Carolina's only winless seasons in the modern era.

In 2013, Davis told CBS Sports' Bruce Feldman that he believed his firing was an "overreaction" by Thorp, in the belief that "if he released me, maybe the investigation of the football program would go in a different direction." Around the same time, Baddour told Feldman that firing Davis "was not my recommendation." Baddour added that Thorp was well aware that he wanted Davis to remain as coach.

=== Tampa Bay Buccaneers ===
In February 2012, the Tampa Bay Buccaneers hired Davis as a special assistant to newly hired head coach Greg Schiano. The terms of Davis's settlement with the University of North Carolina prevented him from taking a coaching position, and he was instead hired as an advisor to Schiano, who was the defensive coordinator under Davis at the University of Miami.

=== FIU ===
On November 14, 2016, Davis confirmed he was leaving his analyst position at ESPN and agreed to a five-year contract to take the head coaching job at Florida International. In November 2021, FIU declined to extend Davis beyond the 2021 season, ending his tenure there after five seasons.

A month prior to his contract's expiration, Davis accused the university of "sabotaging" the football program. He claimed that player safety equipment was at least a decade old, thus having to rely on donated equipment from Mississippi State. He also attacked the university for prohibiting the coaching staff from conducting visits with recruits. In October 2021, the university posted a job opening for head football coach while Davis still held the position.

== Head coaching record ==
=== College ===
Year	Team	Overall	Conference	Standing	Bowl/playoffs	Coaches^{#}	AP^{°}
Miami Hurricanes (Big East Conference) (1995–2000)
1995	Miami	8–3	6–1	T–1st			20
1996	Miami	9–3	6–1	T–1st	W Carquest	14	14
1997	Miami	5–6	3–4	T–5th			
1998	Miami	9–3	5–2	T–2nd	W Micron PC	21	20
1999	Miami	9–4	6–1	2nd	W Gator	15	15
2000	Miami	11–1	7–0	1st	W Sugar^{†}	2	2
Miami:		51–20	33–9				
North Carolina Tar Heels (Atlantic Coast Conference) (2007–2010)
2007	North Carolina	4–8	3–5	4th (Coastal)			
2008	North Carolina	0–5*	0–4*	T–3rd (Coastal)	L Meineke Car Care		
2009	North Carolina	0–5*	0–4*	4th (Coastal)	L Meineke Car Care		
2010	North Carolina	8–5	4–4	T–3rd (Coastal)	W Music City		
North Carolina:		12–23**	7–17**				
FIU Panthers (Conference USA) (2017–2021)
2017	FIU	8–5	5–3	2nd (East)	L Gasparilla		
2018	FIU	9–4	6–2	T–2nd (East)	W Bahamas		
2019	FIU	6–7	3–5	T–5th (East)	L Camellia		
2020	FIU	0–5	0–3	6th (East)			
2021	FIU	1–11	0–8	7th (East)			
FIU:		24–32	14–21				
Total:		87–75					
National championship Conference title Conference division title or championship game berth
^{†}Indicates BCS bowl.; ^{#}Rankings from final Coaches Poll.; ^{°}Rankings from final AP Poll.

* North Carolina vacated all 16 wins in the 2008 and 2009 seasons due to NCAA violations. On-field record in 2008 was 8–5 (4–4 ACC); on-field record in 2009 was 8–5 (4–4 ACC).
**Record at North Carolina is 28–23 (15–17 ACC) counting vacated games.

=== NFL ===
Team	Year	Regular season					Postseason			
Team	Year	Won	Lost	Ties	Win %	Finish	Won	Lost	Win %	Result
CLE	2001	7	9	0	.438	3rd in AFC Central	-	-	-	-
CLE	2002	9	7	0	.563	2nd in AFC North	0	1	.000	Lost to Pittsburgh Steelers in AFC Wild Card game
CLE	2003	5	11	0	.313	4th in AFC North	-	-	-	-
CLE	2004	3	8	0	.273	Resigned	-	-	-	-
CLE Total		24	35	0	.407		0	1	.000	-
Total		24	35	0	.407		0	1	.000	-
