= 2009 Meineke Car Care Bowl =

Pittsburgh Panthers	North Carolina Tar Heels
(9–3)	(8–4)
Big East	ACC
19	17
Head coach: Dave Wannstedt	Head coach: Butch Davis
AP / Coaches / BCS; 17 / 16 / 17	AP / Coaches / BCS; NR / NR / NR
	1	2	3	4	Total
Pittsburgh	0	13	3	3	19
North Carolina	7	3	7	0	17
- Date: December 26, 2009
- Season: 2009
- Stadium: Bank of America Stadium
- Location: Charlotte, North Carolina
- MVP: RB Dion Lewis (Pittsburgh)
- Referee: R.G. Detillier (CUSA)
- Attendance: 50,389
- Payout: US$1,000,000 per team

United States TV coverage
- Network: ESPN, ESPN360
- Announcers: Bob Wischusen (Play by Play); Bob Griese (Analyst); Chris Spielman (Analyst); Quint Kessenich (Sideline)
- Nielsen ratings: 3.9

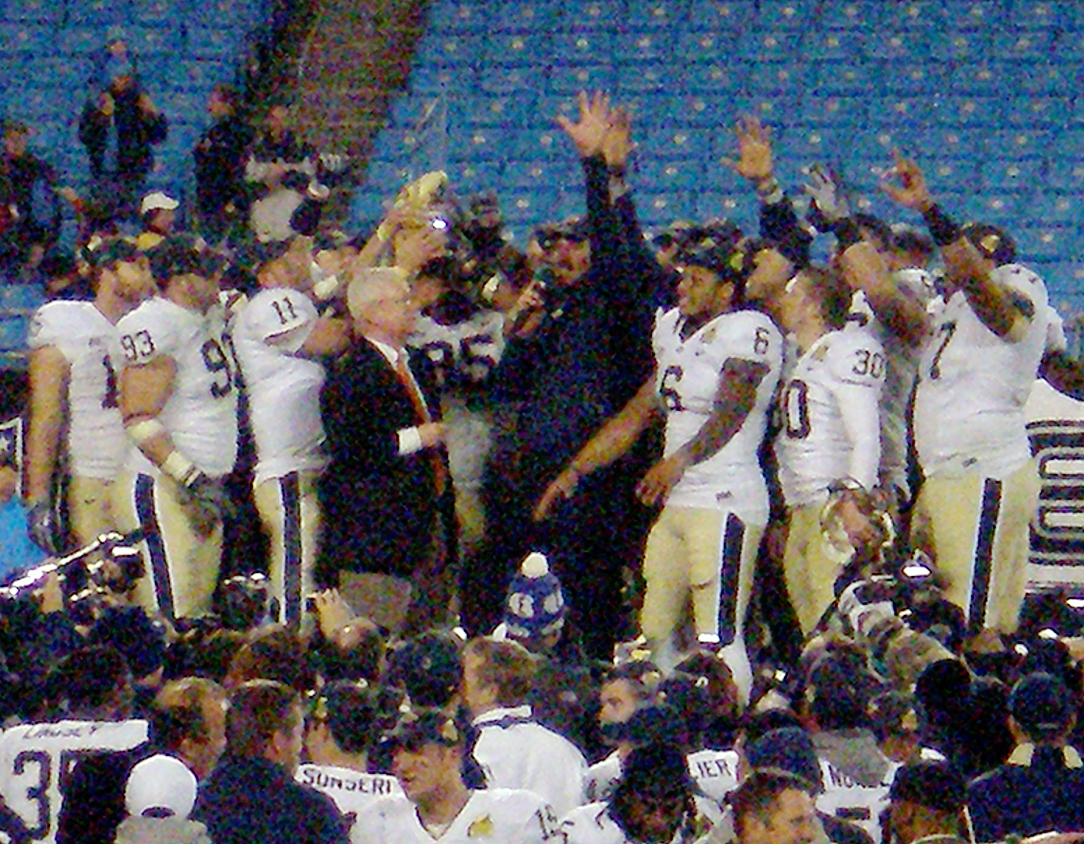
Pitt head coach Dave Wannstedt addresses the crowd during the trophy presentation

The 2009 Meineke Car Care Bowl was the eighth edition of the college football bowl game, and was played at Bank of America Stadium in Charlotte, North Carolina. The game started at 4:30 p.m. US EST on Saturday, December 26, 2009, and was telecasted on ESPN and ESPN360. The Pittsburgh Panthers defeated the North Carolina Tar Heels 19–17 with a 33-yard field goal and .52 seconds remaining in the game.

Pitt (9–3) finished second in the Big East after losing at home to Cincinnati on December 5 in a game decided by a missed extra point. The Panthers played in the Charlotte bowl (then known as the Continental Tire Bowl) in 2003, losing to Virginia 23–16.

North Carolina (8–4) made its third appearance in the bowl game, and its second in a row. They lost to West Virginia in the 2008 game, 31–30. A deal was initially in the works to have UNC play fellow traditional college basketball power Kentucky in the Music City Bowl. However, this came undone when all of the ACC's top-tier bowl selections passed on ACC title game loser Clemson, forcing the Music City Bowl to select the Tigers. The ACC's bowl selection rules at the time did not allow the conference title game loser to fall below the Music City Bowl, which has the fifth pick from ACC bowl-eligible teams. This sent the Tar Heels to the Meineke Car Care Bowl, which has the sixth pick. The game will mark the seventh time that the two schools have played each other and the first time they will meet in the post-season. Entering the game, UNC led the series 4–2 with the last meeting being a 20–17 Tar Heels victory in Pittsburgh.

The Tar Heels' appearances have accounted for two of the game's three sellouts; the 2008 game attracted its largest crowd ever. UNC has a large alumni and fan base in the area, and Charlotte is only two hours south of the UNC campus. However, the 2009 game only attracted a crowd of 50,389, the smallest in the game's eight-year history.

== Game summary ==
North Carolina wore their home blue jerseys, Pitt wore their away white jerseys.

Pitt freshman tailback Dion Lewis rushed for 159 yards and a touchdown on his way to being named the game's MVP. Lewis also broke the Pitt single season rushing record for a freshman, breaking Tony Dorsett's record of 1,686 in the first quarter of the game. Lewis also passed Craig Heyward for second in terms of overall single season rushing. Lewis finished with 1,799 yards on the season. UNC was led by their junior quarterback, T. J. Yates, who passed for 183 yards and two touchdowns. Pitt finished the season with 10 wins. This was their first 10 win season since 1981, when they were led by quarterback Dan Marino.

=== Scoring summary ===
Scoring Play	Score
1st Quarter
UNC – Greg Little 15-yard pass from T.J. Yates (Casey Barth kick), 6:57	UNC 7–0
2nd Quarter
PITT – Dan Hutchins 31 yard field goal, 14:11	UNC 7–3
PITT – Dion Lewis 11-yard run (Dan Hutchins kick), 11:08	PITT 10–7
UNC – Casey Barth 37 yard field goal, 1:05	TIE 10–10
PITT – Dan Hutchins 31 yard field goal, 0:00	PITT 13–10
3rd Quarter
PITT – Dan Hutchins 42 yard field goal, 9:11	PITT 16–10
UNC – Greg Little 14-yard pass from T.J. Yates (Casey Barth kick), 4:00	UNC 17–16
4th Quarter
PITT – Dan Hutchins 33 yard field goal, 0:52	PITT 19–17
