= Dion Lewis =

American football player (born 1990)

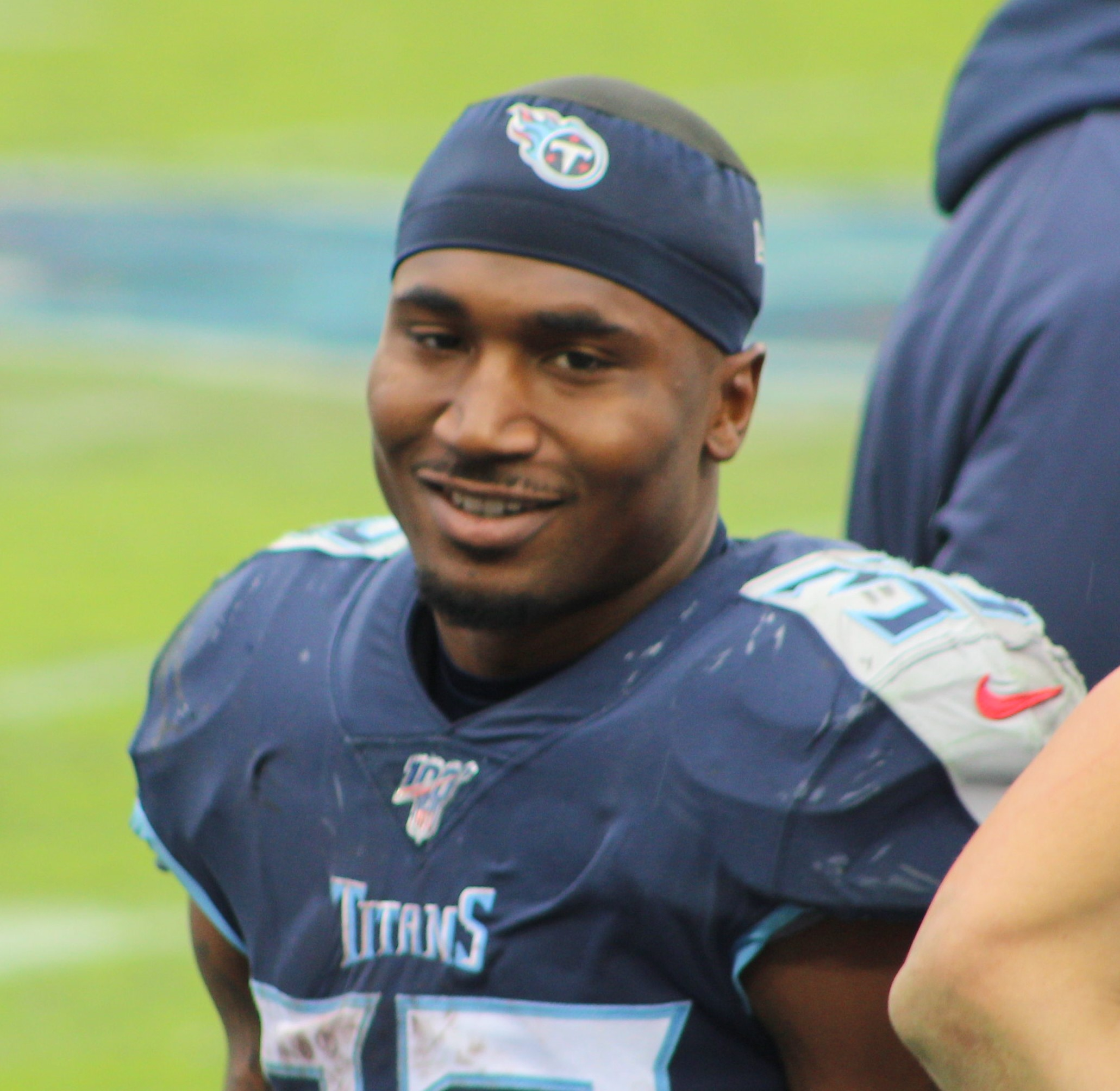
- Lewis with the Tennessee Titans in 2019

Albany Great Danes
- Title: Assistant running backs coach

Personal information
- Born: September 27, 1990 (age 36); Albany, New York, U.S.
- Listed height: 5 ft 8 in (1.73 m)
- Listed weight: 195 lb (88 kg)

Career information
- High school: The Albany Academy
- College: Pittsburgh (2009–2010)
- NFL draft: 2011: 5th round, 149th overall pick

Career history

Playing
- Philadelphia Eagles (2011–2012); Cleveland Browns (2013); Indianapolis Colts (2014); New England Patriots (2015–2017); Tennessee Titans (2018–2019); New York Giants (2020)

Coaching
- Albany (2023–present) Assistant running backs coach

Awards and highlights
- Super Bowl champion (LI); Second-team All-American (2009); Big East Rookie of the Year (2009); Big East Offensive Player of the Year (2009)

Career NFL statistics
- Rushing yards: 2,425
- Rushing average: 4.3
- Receptions: 191
- Receiving yards: 1,408
- Return yards: 1,845
- Total touchdowns: 21
- Stats at Pro Football Reference

Dion John Lewis (born September 27, 1990) is an American football coach and former running back who played in the National Football League (NFL) for 10 seasons. He played college football for the Pittsburgh Panthers, earning second-team All-American honors in 2009. Lewis was selected by the Philadelphia Eagles in the fifth round of the 2011 NFL draft. He is currently the assistant running backs coach for the University of Albany.

After two seasons with the Eagles, Lewis then had stints with the Cleveland Browns and Indianapolis Colts over the next two seasons, but never appeared in a game for either team. He then played three seasons with the New England Patriots and won Super Bowl LI with the team. Lewis then played for the Tennessee Titans for two seasons before playing his final season with the New York Giants.

== Early life ==
A native of Albany, New York, Lewis attended Albany High School, from which he transferred to the Albany Academy and later to Blair Academy, where he led his team to a 17–1 record (.944) his final two seasons, including two MAPL championships and a New Jersey Prep state title. Lewis averaged 12.4 yards per carry as a junior, rushing for 979 yards on 79 carries with 14 touchdowns. As a senior at Blair Academy, he averaged an astounding 14.1 yards per carry, rushing for 1,243 yards on 88 carries. Lewis eclipsed the 250-yard rushing mark four times and scored 26 total touchdowns, including 23 rushing, two on punt returns and one receiving. He was also a three-year letterman in track & field at Blair Academy, competing in sprints (11.09 100m and 23.06 200m), long jump (20′2″), and relays (44.29 4×100).

== College career ==
Lewis attended and played college football for the University of Pittsburgh from 2009 to 2010, but was offered a scholarship from just two other schools, Miami of Ohio and Tulane.

=== 2009 season ===
During 12 regular season games of the 2009 season at the University of Pittsburgh, Lewis accumulated 1,640 rushing yards and 17 touchdowns. He rushed for 180 yards and two touchdowns in an October 2009 victory over Big East rival Rutgers, for which he was named Big East Conference Offensive Player of the Week and featured in Sports Illustrated. Following this and later performances, Lewis was mentioned in several news outlets as a possible Heisman Trophy candidate. He had his sixth 100-yard plus rushing game of the season against Syracuse.

Lewis rushed for more than 1,799 yards during the 2009 season and broke Craig Heyward's record at Pittsburgh for rushes in a single game with 47 against University of Cincinnati in the Big East championship game, totaling 194 rushing yards, three touchdowns, as well as five receptions for 34 yards.

Lewis was the only freshman and one of four running backs named among 15 "Players to Watch" for the 2009 Walter Camp Player of the Year award. He was also among 16 semifinalists for the Maxwell Award, and was one of 10 semifinalists, and the only true freshman, for the Doak Walker Award. Lewis was also honored as a "Midseason All-American" by CBSSports.com and SI.com.

Lewis set the Big East freshman rushing record previously held by Tony Dorsett. The lightly-recruited running back was third nationally in rushing (1,799 yards, 5.5 avg), broke LeSean McCoy's record for most points by a Pitt freshman in the Big East championship against Cincinnati , and Dorsett's record for most rushing yards by a Pitt freshman during the 2009 Meineke Car Care Bowl, after which he was named the game's MVP.

Following the conclusion of the regular season, Lewis was named the National Freshman of the Year by the Sporting News and CBSSports.com, as well as the Offensive Freshman of the Year by College Football News. He was also named a second-team All-American by the Associated Press, Sporting News, CBSSports.com, Sports Illustrated, Rivals.com, and Scout.com. Lewis was the only freshman named to the first or second AP All-American team. Lewis was named both the Big East Conference Rookie of the Year and Offensive Player of the Year as well as the Eastern College Athletic Conference Rookie of the Year.

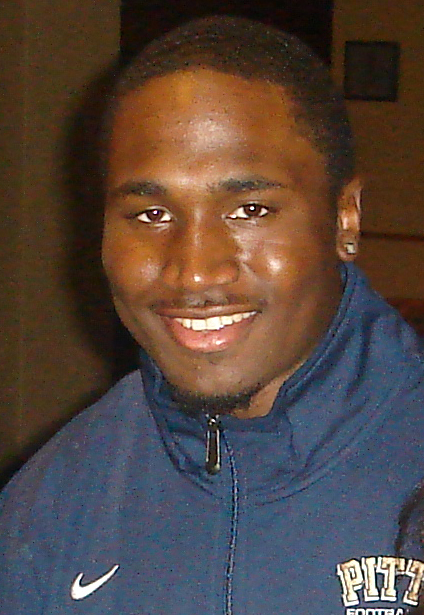
Lewis in college

=== 2010 season ===
Heading into 2010, the Sporting News, in its 2010 College Football Yearbook, called Lewis "the game's most complete runner" and listed him as one of the five leading candidates for the Heisman Trophy. The Sporting News also listed Lewis as a first-team preseason All-American. However, Lewis failed to live up to these lofty expectations. After 75 yards in a disappointing loss to unranked Utah, he struggled with just 27 yards against FCS (formerly Division I-AA) New Hampshire while teammate Ray Graham had 115. Lewis suffered an upper-body injury after compiling 41 yards to Graham's 100 in a loss to Miami (FL), and sat on the bench while Graham compiled the second-most rushing yards in school history against FIU. Though he had more carries than Graham the rest of the season, the two split rushing duties and it was not until the team's seventh game Lewis broke 100 yards rushing against Rutgers. Lewis' best game of the season was the regular season finale, where he had 42 carries for 261 yards and four touchdowns, including a 76-yard touchdown run early in the second quarter against Cincinnati. Lewis also had 105 yards and a touchdown in Pitt's BBVA Compass Bowl victory over Kentucky.

In early January, Lewis declared that he would enter the 2011 NFL draft and forgo his junior and senior seasons.

== Professional career ==
Pre-draft measurables
Height	Weight	Arm length	Hand span	Wingspan	40-yard dash	10-yard split	20-yard split	20-yard shuttle	Three-cone drill	Vertical jump	Broad jump	Bench press
5 ft 6 5/8 in (1.69 m)	193 lb (88 kg)	28 1/8 in (0.71 m)	8 3/4 in (0.22 m)	5 ft 9 3/4 in (1.77 m)	4.47 s	1.51 s	2.54 s	4.18 s	6.90 s	34.5 in (0.88 m)	9 ft 4 in (2.84 m)	17 reps
All values from NFL Combine/Pro Day

=== Philadelphia Eagles ===
==== 2011 season ====
Lewis was selected in the fifth round (149th overall) of the 2011 NFL draft by the Philadelphia Eagles. He was the 19th running back selected in that year's draft. On July 27, 2011, Lewis was signed to a four-year contract worth $2.2 million.

Lewis spent his rookie year as the Eagles' kick returner. He was third on the running back depth chart behind LeSean McCoy and Ronnie Brown and saw little playing time, not carrying the ball more than twice per game until the season-finale against the Washington Redskins, when he had 12 carries for 58 yards and his first NFL touchdown in the 34–10 victory.

Lewis finished his rookie year with 23 carries for 102 yards and a touchdown to go along with 31 kick returns for 669 yards in 15 games and no starts.

==== 2012 season ====
Lewis' role for the Eagles in 2012 was similar to his role in the previous season, as a kick returner primarily. He was once again third on the running back depth chart, behind McCoy and rookie Bryce Brown. Lewis saw no carries prior to Week 12 when the team began giving him some role in the running game, though never touching the ball more than five times in a game. Lewis' lone rushing touchdown came during a Week 16 27–20 loss to the Washington Redskins on a 17-yard rush.

Lewis finished his second professional season with 13 carries for 69 yards and a touchdown to go along with two receptions for 24 yards and a 33-yard kick return in nine games and no starts.

=== Cleveland Browns ===
On April 11, 2013, Lewis was traded to the Cleveland Browns for linebacker Emmanuel Acho. However, Lewis missed the entire season due to a fractured fibula.

Lewis was cut by the Browns on August 30, 2014.

=== Indianapolis Colts ===
Lewis signed with the Indianapolis Colts on September 9, 2014. He was released exactly a week later and did not play again in the 2014 season.

=== New England Patriots ===
==== 2015 season ====
On December 31, 2014, the New England Patriots signed Lewis to a future/reserve contract.

Lewis made the team's 53-man roster and saw his first game action on September 10, 2015, in the Patriots' 28–21 season-opening victory over the Pittsburgh Steelers, after two years of not playing. Starting for the first time in his career in place of a suspended LeGarrette Blount, Lewis recorded 120 yards from scrimmage. Despite facing competition from Blount, Lewis continued a successful start to the season with 138 and 67 total yards respectively in Weeks 2 and 3 against the Buffalo Bills and Jacksonville Jaguars. In the game against the Bills, Lewis scored his first touchdown as a Patriot and recorded six receptions.

On October 8, 2015, after just three games, Lewis signed a two-year contract extension with the Patriots, running through the 2017 season. The contract included a $600,000 signing bonus and $1.8 million in incentives in 2016 and 2017.

In his first game after signing the contract, a 30–6 road victory over the Dallas Cowboys, Lewis had six carries for 34 yards and eight receptions for 59 yards and a touchdown. Two weeks later against the Miami Dolphins, he rushed five times for 19 yards and caught six passes for 93 yards and a touchdown as the Patriots won by a score of 36–7. In the next game against the Washington Redskins, Lewis had four carries for 14 yards and four receptions for 39 yards before leaving the eventual 27–10 victory with a knee injury. It was later revealed that Lewis tore his ACL, prematurely ending his season. Lewis was placed on injured reserve on November 9, 2015.

Lewis finished the 2015 season with 49 carries for 234 yards and two touchdowns to go along with 36 receptions for 388 yards and two touchdowns in seven games and six starts.

==== 2016 season ====
On August 30, 2016, Lewis was placed on the Reserve/PUP list to start the 2016 season after requiring a second knee surgery. He was activated to the active roster on November 12, prior to Week 10 matchup against the Seattle Seahawks.

On January 14, 2017, in the Patriots' 34–16 Divisional Round victory over the Houston Texans, Lewis became the first player in the Super Bowl era to score touchdowns on a run, a reception, and a kickoff return in the same postseason game. In the AFC Championship Game against the Pittsburgh Steelers, he was limited to only 19 scrimmage yards in the 36–17 victory. On February 5, 2017, Lewis was part of the Patriots team that won Super Bowl LI. In the game, he had six carries for 27 yards and a two-yard reception as the Patriots defeated the Atlanta Falcons by a score of 34–28 in overtime. The Patriots trailed 28–3 in the third quarter but rallied all the way back to win the game. The Super Bowl featured the first overtime period and the largest comeback in Super Bowl history.

==== 2017 season ====
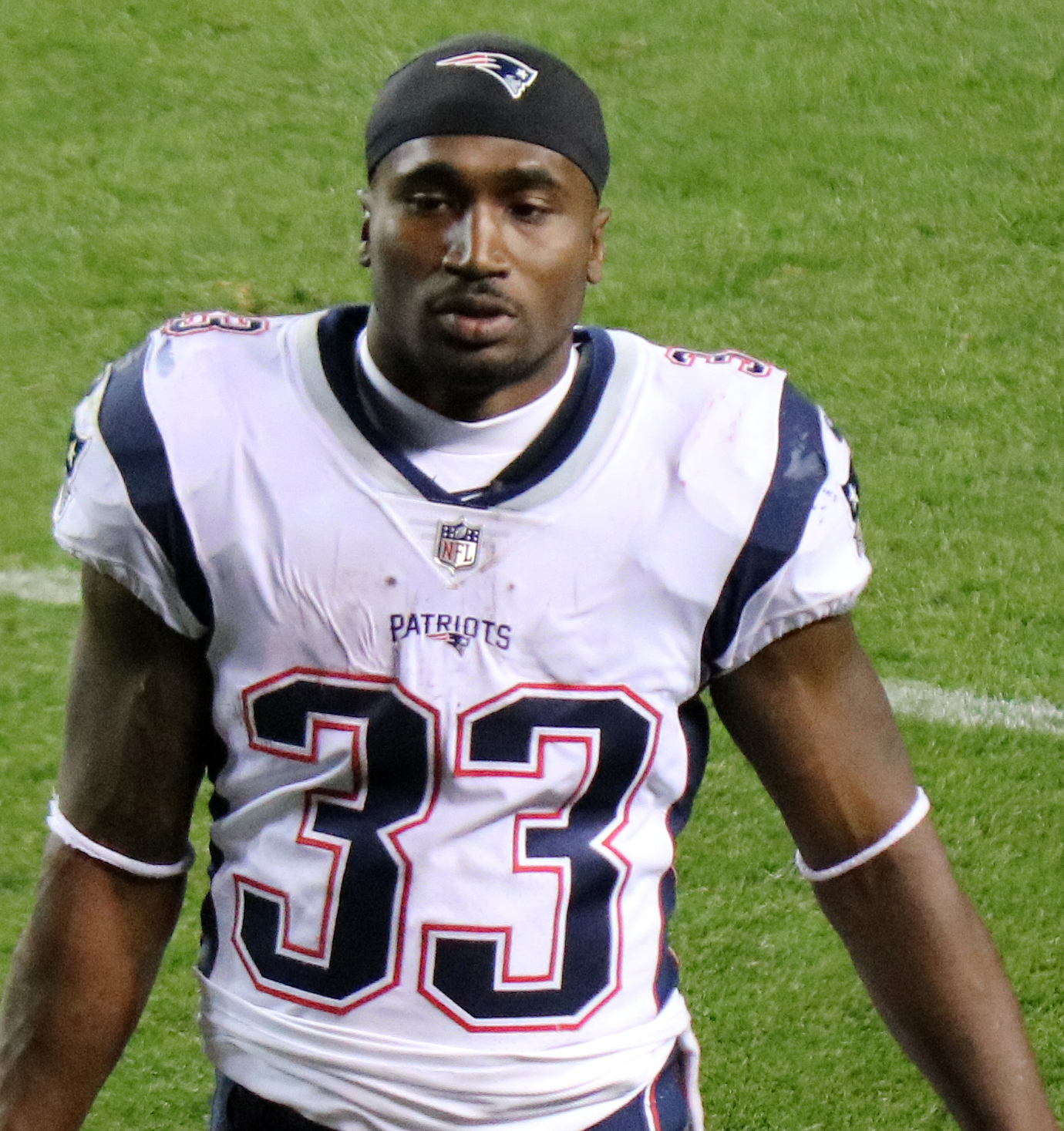
Lewis in 2017

Lewis began the 2017 season as a reserve running back, with new acquisition Mike Gillislee taking the majority of snaps on first and second downs and receiving specialist James White serving as the primary third-down back. With new acquisition Rex Burkhead also getting playing time, the Patriots were deep at running back and frequently distributed carries among all four of them. Lewis was named the team's primary kick returner. During the first four games, Lewis never carried the ball more than four times in a game, and never ran for more than 18 yards. He also caught a smattering of passes, lining up both in the backfield and split wide. His only touchdown in that stretch came during a Week 4 33–30 loss to the Carolina Panthers.

Lewis' role on the team changed starting in Week 5, with Gillislee shifting to a short-yardage specialist role, and Lewis became the primary first- and second-down runner. In each week from Week 5 to 8, he saw his number of carries increase to 15 per game, and his rushing yardage also increased, frequently accumulating more than 50 yards per game. During a Week 10 41–16 road victory over the Denver Broncos on Sunday Night Football, Lewis had 14 carries for 55 yards and a touchdown to go along with 103-yard kickoff return touchdown, earning him AFC Special Teams Player of the Week honors. Two weeks later against the Miami Dolphins, Lewis had 15 carries for a career-high 112 yards in the 35–17 victory. During a Week 15 27–24 road victory over the Pittsburgh Steelers, he recorded 13 carries for 67 yards and a touchdown to go along with a 13-yard reception. In the next game against the Buffalo Bills on Christmas Eve, Lewis had 24 carries for a new career-high 129 yards and two touchdowns to go along with five receptions for 24 yards and a touchdown as the Patriots won by a score of 37–16, marking his first career two rushing touchdown game. His performance in Week 16 earned him AFC Offensive Player of the Week honors. In the regular-season finale against the New York Jets, Lewis had 26 carries for 93 yards and a touchdown to go along with six receptions for 40 yards and a touchdown as the Patriots won by a score of 26–6.

The 2017 regular season was the first time Lewis appeared in all 16 regular season games, and the first time since his rookie year he appeared in more than nine games in a season. In the playoffs leading up to Super Bowl LII, Lewis was the Patriots' top rusher, amassing 101 yards on the ground over the course of two games against the Tennessee Titans and Jacksonville Jaguars. He had a key 18-yard run on third-and-9 late in the fourth quarter of the AFC Championship Game against the Jaguars, gaining a first down and allowing the Patriots to run out the clock to preserve a 24–20 victory. During Super Bowl LII against the Philadelphia Eagles, Lewis had nine carries for 39 yards, but the Patriots lost by a score of 41–33.

=== Tennessee Titans ===
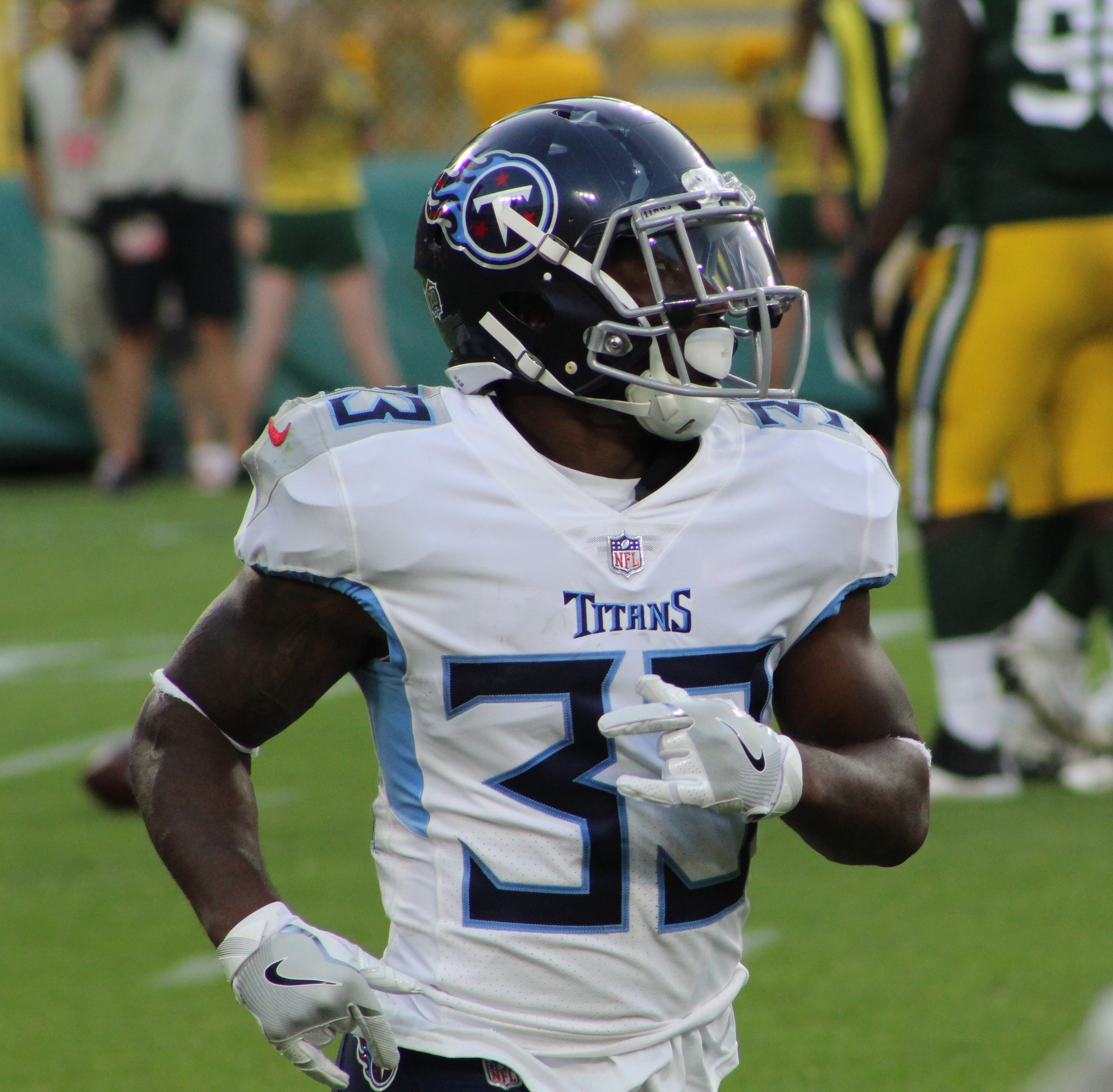
Lewis in 2018

On March 15, 2018, Lewis signed a four-year, $20 million contract, with an additional $3 million in incentives, with the Tennessee Titans.

During the offseason, Matt LaFleur was hired as the Titans' new offensive coordinator. His offensive scheme often used running backs to catch passes out of the backfield, which led to success with Todd Gurley in the previous season and was seen as matching Lewis' pass-catching skillset. This led to speculation that LaFleur would favor Lewis over the Titans' emerging running back Derrick Henry.

==== 2018 season ====
During the Titans' season-opening 27–20 road loss to the Miami Dolphins, Lewis had a solid game with 16 carries for 75 yards and a touchdown to go along with five receptions for 35 yards. During a narrow Week 7 20–19 loss to the Los Angeles Chargers in London, Lewis had 13 carries for 91 yards and six receptions for 64 yards. Following a Week 8 bye, Lewis was both the leading rusher and receiver during a Week 9 28–14 road victory over the Dallas Cowboys on Monday Night Football, rushing for 62 yards on 19 carries and catching four passes for 60 yards and a touchdown. By the end of the season, Lewis' role decreased as Henry emerged as the Titans' main running back.

Lewis finished the 2018 season with 155 carries for 517 yards and a touchdown to go along with 59 receptions for 400 yards and a touchdown in 16 games and seven starts.

==== 2019 season ====
Lewis' role continued to decrease in the 2019 season due to the continuation of Henry's rise. During a Week 15 24–21 loss to the Houston Texans, Lewis scored his only touchdown of the year on an 11-yard reception from Ryan Tannehill. In the next game against the New Orleans Saints, Lewis made his only start of the season in place of Henry, who was out with a hamstring injury. Lewis finished the 38–28 loss with 15 carries for 68 yards and a 19-yard reception.

Lewis finished the 2019 season with 54 carries for 209 yards to go along with 25 receptions for 164 yards and a touchdown in 16 games and one start.

On March 12, 2020, Lewis was released by the Titans.

=== New York Giants ===
On April 1, 2020, Lewis signed with the New York Giants.

Lewis began the season as a backup to Saquon Barkley, who was placed on injured reserve after Week 2. For the rest of the season, Lewis split carries with Alfred Morris as backups to Wayne Gallman.

Lewis finished the season playing in all 16 games, rushing 29 times for 115 yards and two touchdowns to go along with 18 receptions for 127 yards and a touchdown as the Giants finished with a 6–10 record. He also returned 24 kicks for 538 yards.

=== Retirement ===
On August 13, 2021, Lewis announced his retirement from the NFL after 10 seasons.

== Career statistics ==
=== NFL ===
Legend
	Won the Super Bowl
	Led the league
**Bold**	Career high

==== Regular season ====
Year	Team	Games		Rushing					Receiving					Returning					Fumbles	
Year	Team	GP	GS	Att	Yds	Avg	Lng	TD	Rec	Yds	Avg	Lng	TD	Ret	Yds	Avg	Lng	TD	Fum	Lost
2011	PHI	15	0	23	102	4.4	20	1	1	−3	−3.0	−3	0	**31**	**669**	21.6	33	0	1	**1**
2012	PHI	9	0	13	69	**5.3**	17	1	2	24	**12.0**	28	0	1	33	**33.0**	33	0	0	0
2013	CLE	0	0	DNP																
2014	IND	0	0	DNP																
2015	NE	7	6	49	234	4.8	13	2	36	388	10.8	**40**	2	0	0	0.0	0	0	**2**	**1**
2016	NE	7	5	64	283	4.4	15	0	17	94	5.5	16	0	2	35	17.5	23	0	1	0
2017	NE	**16**	**8**	**180**	**896**	5.0	**44**	**6**	32	214	6.7	20	**3**	23	570	24.8	**103T**	**1**	0	0
2018	TEN	**16**	7	155	517	3.3	36	1	**59**	**400**	6.8	37	1	0	0	0.0	0	0	1	1
2019	TEN	16	1	54	209	3.9	17	0	25	164	6.6	24	1	0	0	0.0	0	0	1	1
2020	NYG	16	0	29	115	4.0	19	2	19	127	6.7	17	1	24	538	22.4	0	0	3	0
Career		102	27	567	2,425	4.3	44	13	191	1,408	7.4	40	8	81	1,845	22.8	103T	1	9	4

==== Postseason ====
Year	Team	Games		Rushing					Receiving					Returning					Fumbles	
Year	Team	GP	GS	Att	Yds	Avg	Lng	TD	Rec	Yds	Avg	Lng	TD	Ret	Yds	Avg	Lng	TD	Fum	Lost
2016	NE	**3**	2	25	79	3.2	13	**1**	5	33	6.6	13	**1**	5	**162**	**32.4**	**98T**	**1**	**2**	0
2017	NE	**3**	**3**	**33**	**135**	**4.1**	**18**	0	**16**	**111**	6.9	**31**	0	**6**	106	17.7	27	0	1	**1**
2019	TEN	**3**	0	2	8	4.0	6	0	2	14	**7.0**	8	0	0	0	0.0	0	0	0	0
Career		9	5	60	222	3.7	18	1	23	158	6.9	31	1	11	268	24.4	98T	1	3	1

=== College ===
Season	Team	Rushing				Receiving		
Season	Team	Att	Yds	Avg	TD	Rec	Yds	TD
2009	Pittsburgh	325	1,799	5.5	17	25	189	1
2010	Pittsburgh	219	1,061	4.8	13	27	216	0
Career		544	2,860	5.3	30	52	405	1

== Coaching career ==
Lewis joined the coaching staff at Albany in 2023 as the program's assistant running backs coach.
