= 2009 Pittsburgh Panthers football team =

American college football season

2009 Pittsburgh Panthers football

Meineke Car Care Bowl champion

Meineke Car Care Bowl, W 19–17 vs. North Carolina
- Conference: Big East Conference

Ranking
- Coaches: No. 15
- AP: No. 15
- Record: 10–3 (5–2 Big East)
- Head coach: Dave Wannstedt (5th season)
- Offensive coordinator: Frank Cignetti Jr. (1st season)
- Offensive scheme: Pro-style
- Defensive coordinator: Phil Bennett (2nd season)
- Base defense: 4–3
- Home stadium: Heinz Field

2009 Big East Conference football standings
| | Conf. | | | Overall |
| Team | W | | L | W | | L |
|---|---|---|---|---|---|---|
| No. 8 Cincinnati $ | 7 | – | 0 | 12 | – | 1 |
| No. 25 West Virginia | 5 | – | 2 | 9 | – | 4 |
| No. 15 Pittsburgh | 5 | – | 2 | 10 | – | 3 |
| Rutgers | 3 | – | 4 | 9 | – | 4 |
| Connecticut | 3 | – | 4 | 8 | – | 5 |
| South Florida | 3 | – | 4 | 8 | – | 5 |
| Louisville | 1 | – | 6 | 4 | – | 8 |
| Syracuse | 1 | – | 6 | 4 | – | 8 |
$ – BCS representative as conference champion; Rankings from AP Poll

The 2009 Pittsburgh Panthers football team represented the University of Pittsburgh in the 2009 NCAA Division I FBS football season. The season was the fifth under head coach Dave Wannstedt. The 2009 season marked the team ninth at Heinz Field and the program's 120th season overall. The 2009 season saw the introduction of a new offensive coordinator, Frank Cignetti, Jr. Pitt got off to a 9–1 start with impressive wins over Navy, Notre Dame for the second consecutive year, and Rutgers for the first time since 2004. Pitt was ranked number 9 in the AP and BCS polls and was off to its best start since 1982. However, Pitt lost the final two regular season games, including a last second loss by a field goal at West Virginia and a one-point loss at home for the Big East championship to undefeated Cincinnati, to finish the regular season at 9–3 (5–2 Big East) for the second consecutive year. The Panthers rebounded by winning the Meineke Car Care Bowl over North Carolina, 19–17, to achieve its first ten-win season since 1981. Pitt ranked number 15 in the final 2009 AP rankings with a 10–3 record. In addition, Pitt players garnered many post-season accolades in 2009, including Big East Offensive Player and Rookie of the Year in Dion Lewis, and Big East Co-defensive Players of the Year in Mick Williams and Greg Romeus.

== Schedule ==
The official Big East schedule was released on March 6, and the Panthers' schedule includes five nationally televised games. The times of the two weeknight games on the schedule, at Louisville and at Rutgers, were announced with the initial release schedule. The Panthers' home intraconference games include Cincinnati, Connecticut, South Florida, and Syracuse; the away games include West Virginia, Louisville, and Rutgers. The Panthers nonconference games had been scheduled well in advance of the 2009 season, but the conference games took longer to schedule due to the difficulty some Big East teams had when trying to schedule their own nonconference opponents. The scheduled times for Pitt's first three games of the season were announced on July 7. A month later, on August 7, it was announced that the game against NC State was scheduled for 3:30 pm and to be broadcast nationally by ESPNU.

On October 26, the Syracuse game was announced as a noon kickoff for ESPNU, and on November 2, the Notre Dame game was announced as an 8:00 p.m. prime time telecast on ABC.

| Date | Time | Opponent | Rank | Site | TV | Result | Attendance |
|---|---|---|---|---|---|---|---|
| September 5 | 1:00 p.m. | Youngstown State* | | Heinz Field; Pittsburgh, PA | | W 38–3 | 48,497 |
| September 12 | 12:00 p.m. | at Buffalo* | | University at Buffalo Stadium; Amherst, NY | ESPN Plus (Note: Baltimore, MD (MASN; Tape-delayed to Sunday, September 13 at 11:30 p.m.); Buffalo, NY (WNYO); Chicago (WPWR); Cincinnati (WKRC-DT2); Cleveland (WEWS); Columbus, OH (WWHO); Dayton, OH (WKEF); Detroit (WDIV); Flint-Saginaw, MI (WSMH); Grand Rapids, MI (WZZM); Harrisburg, PA (WHP); Indianapolis (WTTV); Kansas City, MO (Metro Sports); La Crosse-Eau Claire, WI and La Crescent, MN (KQEG); Lansing, MI (WHTV); Madison, WI (WISC-DT); Milwaukee (WMLW-CA); New Orleans (Cox Sports); New York City (SportsNet New York); Philadelphia (WPHL); Pittsburgh (WTAE); Providence, RI and New Bedford, CT (Cox Sports); Roanoke, VA (WDRL-TV); Rockford, IL (WTVO-DT2); Tampa/St. Pete, FL (Bright House); Toledo, OH (WTVG); Wheeling, WV (WTOV-DT); Youngstown, OH (WYTV).) | W 54–27 | 21,870 |
| September 19 | 6:00 p.m. | Navy* | | Heinz Field; Pittsburgh, PA | ESPN360 | W 27–14 | 55,064 |
| September 26 | 3:30 p.m. | at NC State* | | Carter–Finley Stadium; Raleigh, NC | ESPNU | L 31–38 | 57,583 |
| October 2 | 8:00 p.m. | at Louisville | | Papa John's Cardinal Stadium; Louisville, KY | ESPN2 | W 35–10 | 39,948 |
| October 10 | 3:30 p.m. | Connecticut | | Heinz Field; Pittsburgh, PA | ABC/ESPN (Note: The Pitt–UConn game was carried as a split-national broadcast by ESPN in the majority of the United States to the east of the Mississippi River as well as parts of Minnesota, South Dakota, Iowa, Missouri, and Arkansas. The game was not carried by ESPN in the home territories of both Pitt and Connecticut – covering parts of Pennsylvania, West Virginia, Maryland, Connecticut, Rhode Island, and Massachusetts – but was alternately carried on ABC. The ABC affiliates that broadcast the game locally were: Altoona, PA (WATM); Clarksburg, WV (WBOY); Erie, PA (WJET); New Haven, CT (WTNH); Oak Hill, WV (WOAY); Pittsburgh (WTAE); Providence, RI (WLNE); and Springfield, MA (WGGB).) | W 24–21 | 44,839 |
| October 16 | 8:00 p.m. | at Rutgers | | Rutgers Stadium; Piscataway, NJ | ESPN | W 24–17 | 50,296 |
| October 24 | 12:00 p.m. | South Florida^{†} | No. 20 | Heinz Field; Pittsburgh, PA | ESPN Plus (Note: Boston (WCVB); Charleston-Huntington, WV (WCHS); Chicago (WCIU-DT4, Tape-delayed to Sunday, October 25 at 7:30 a.m.); Cincinnati (WKRC); Clarksburg, WV (WVFX); Dayton, OH (WBDT and WRGT); Denver (Altitude); Harrisburg, PA (WLYH-TV); New Haven/Hartford, CT (WCTX); Huntsville-Decatur, AL (WHNT); Kansas City, MO (Metro Sports); La Crosse-Eau Claire, WI and La Crescent, MN (KQEG); Lexington, KY (WTVQ); Louisville, KY (WHAS); Madison, WI (WMSN); Milwaukee (WMLW-CA); New York City (SportsNet New York); New Orleans (Cox Sports); Oak Hill/Beckley/Bluefield, WV (WOAY); Parkersburg, WV (WTAP); Philadelphia (WPVI); Pittsburgh (WTAE); South Bend, IN (WCWW); Tampa-St. Petersburg, FL (WFTS); Toledo, OH (WTVG); Wheeling, WV (WTOV); Wilkes Barre-Scranton, PA (WSWB); Youngstown, OH (WYTV); Cox Sports in Providence, RI and New Bedford, CT; Mid-Atlantic Sports Network in Baltimore and Washington, D.C.; and throughout New York on Time Warner Cable SportsNet in Albany, Binghamton, Buffalo, Elmira, Rochester, Syracuse, Utica, and Watertown.) | W 41–14 | 50,019 |
| November 7 | 12:00 p.m. | Syracuse | No. 14 | Heinz Field; Pittsburgh, PA (rivalry) | ESPNU | W 37–10 | 46,885 |
| November 14 | 8:00 p.m. | Notre Dame* | No. 8 | Heinz Field; Pittsburgh, PA (rivalry) | ABC (Note: The game against Notre Dame was broadcast to a majority-national audience on ABC – 83 percent of television sets – but was available on ESPN Gameplan in the central United States, where Texas Tech–Oklahoma State was aired on ABC in lieu of Pitt–Notre Dame.) | W 27–22 | 65,374 |
| November 27 | 7:00 p.m. | at West Virginia | No. 8 | Milan Puskar Stadium; Morgantown, WV (Backyard Brawl) | ESPN2 | L 16–19 | 56,123 |
| December 5 | 12:00 p.m. | No. 5 Cincinnati | No. 14 | Heinz Field; Pittsburgh, PA | ABC | L 44–45 | 63,387 |
| December 26 | 4:30 p.m. | vs. North Carolina* | No. 17 | Bank of America Stadium; Charlotte, NC (Meineke Car Care Bowl) | ESPN | W 19–17 | 50,389 |
*Non-conference game; ^{†}Homecoming; Rankings from AP Poll released prior to the game; All times are in Eastern time

Television broadcast notes

== Rankings ==
The official preseason rankings are normally released in August of the same season, but various publications annually release early projections throughout the spring and summer. The Panthers have received mixed reviews from such publications. Phil Steele ranked the Panthers at #23. The Sporting News picked the Panthers to win the conference, but Athlon Sports, who left the Panthers out of their early rankings, project them to finish in fourth place. The Congrove Computer Rankings, a computer program that determines a team's ranking based upon projected regular season results, ranked the Panthers at #12 and predicted an 11–1 regular season record. The Panthers began the season unranked and just outside the Top 25 in both the AP Poll and Coaches Poll.

The Panthers found themselves in the "others receiving votes" category of the major polls throughout the first half of the season, and they officially moved into the Top 25 rankings in all four of the major polls following their October 16 victory at Rutgers. The Panthers climbed several move positions in each poll the following week as a result of their victory over South Florida.

Ranking movements Legend: ██ Increase in ranking ██ Decrease in ranking — = Not ranked RV = Received votes
| | Week | | | | | | | | | | | | | | | |
| Poll | Pre | 1 | 2 | 3 | 4 | 5 | 6 | 7 | 8 | 9 | 10 | 11 | 12 | 13 | 14 | Final |
|---|---|---|---|---|---|---|---|---|---|---|---|---|---|---|---|---|
| AP | RV | RV | RV | RV | — | RV | RV | 20 | 16 | 14 | 8 | 8 | 8 | 14 | 17 | 15 |
| Coaches | RV | RV | RV | RV | — | RV | RV | 19 | 17 | 14 | 9 | 9 | 9 | 15 | 16 | 15 |
| Harris | Not released | | | | RV | RV | RV | 20 | 17 | 15 | 9 | 9 | 9 | 15 | 16 | Not released |
| BCS | Not released | | | | | | | 20 | 15 | 13 | 12 | 9 | 9 | 15 | 17 | Not released |

== Preseason ==
On February 5, 2009, the day after National Signing Day, it was made public that offensive coordinator Matt Cavanaugh would be leaving the Panthers to again pursue a career in the NFL. Cavanaugh's move to the Jets to become their new quarterbacks coach was not officially announced until February 9. The Panthers took only two weeks to find their new offensive coordinator, Frank Cignetti, Jr. Cignetti took a pay cut by accepting the offer from Pitt, but he cited the local cost of living and proximity to his own and his wife's families as major reasons for leaving California for Pitt. Cignetti has a reputation for developing quarterbacks and will be expected to do the same at Pitt where senior Bill Stull, Pitt's returning starter, and the passing game increasingly struggled down the stretch last season. The other primary candidates for the Panthers' offensive coordinator position were former Panthers head coach Walt Harris and New York Jets wide receivers coach Noel Mazzone.

Linebacker Adam Gunn was granted a sixth year of eligibility by the NCAA and will play in 2009, medical clearance pending. He was injured in the 3rd quarter of the 2008 season opener against Bowling Green when he collided with fellow linebacker Scott McKillop. Shane Murray, who was injured during the preseason in August 2008 and started at linebacker along with Gunn in 2007, will also be back with the Panthers in 2009. The returns of Gunn and Murray from injuries and Greg Williams, who started in place of Gunn in 2008, give the Panthers a stable of experienced linebackers headed into the 2009 season.

The NCAA released the 2009 Academic Progress Rate (APR) scores, which measure "a school's ability to retain its athletes and keep them eligible from semester to semester," on May 7. The 2009 scores are data from the 2004–05 to 2007–08 academic years. The Panthers football team finished with the fifth best APR scores in the 8-team Big East, with a score of 944 out of a possible 1,000.

=== Recruiting ===
All players who signed with Pitt had verbally committed to the University within the year prior to signing a binding National Letter of Intent on national signing day. The Panthers also added one player who is not designated as a recruit, tight end Andrew Devlin, who transferred to Pitt in May and had been recruited by Coaches Wannstedt and Gattuso two years earlier in 2007 when had initially decided to play for the Virginia Cavaliers. He chose to transfer to Pitt after a change in offensive scheme would have forced him to change position to defensive with the Cavaliers.

Half of the Panthers new signees played high school football in Pennsylvania, and nine of those ten players were first-team all-state selections in 2008. The Panthers were expected to bring in players to add depth to the team – not necessarily an instant impact in 2009 – because the Panthers are no longer a struggling team in need of immediate performers. After signing day this class was not rated as a star-studded class that would be expected to provide an instant impact, but many of the players are viewed as players able to significantly contribute in the future. The players most expected to make an impact in the future are wide receiver Todd Thomas, tight end Brock DeCicco, running back Raymond Graham and linebackers Shane Gordon and Dan Mason. As of February 5, the 2009 recruiting class was ranked as the 47th best class nationally by Rivals.com – much lower than previous Wannstedt recruiting classes – and 28th best by Scout.com. Dave Wannstedt dismissed the criticism of his recruiting class as the low reviews of his class were a result of the low number of scholarships that the Panthers were able to offer due to the low number of graduating Pitt seniors in 2008 as well as a down year for high school seniors in western Pennsylvania.

College recruiting (2009)
| Name | Hometown | School | Height | Weight | 40^{‡} | Commit date |
|---|---|---|---|---|---|---|
| Cory King; OG | Stoneboro, Pennsylvania | Lakeview HS | 6 ft 5 in (1.96 m) | 308 lb (140 kg) | n/a | Jun 4, 2008 |
| Cory King; OG | Recruit ratings: Scout: Rivals: (67) | | | | | |
| Dion Lewis; RB | Blairstown, New Jersey | Blair Academy | 5 ft 7 1/4 in (1.71 m) | 180 lb (82 kg) | 4.43 | Jun 17, 2008 |
| Dion Lewis; RB | Recruit ratings: Scout: Rivals: (75) | | | | | |
| Juantez Hollins; OG | Aliquippa, Pennsylvania | Aliquippa HS | 6 ft 4 in (1.93 m) | 265 lb (120 kg) | n/a | Jun 24, 2008 |
| Juantez Hollins; OG | Recruit ratings: Scout: Rivals: (77) | | | | | |
| Jack Lippert; DE | Harrisburg, Pennsylvania | Central Dauphin HS | 6 ft 3 1/2 in (1.92 m) | 244 lb (111 kg) | 4.65 | Jun 27, 2008 |
| Jack Lippert; DE | Recruit ratings: Scout: Rivals: (78) | | | | | |
| Devin Street; WR | Bethlehem, Pennsylvania | Liberty HS | 6 ft 3 3/4 in (1.92 m) | 178 lb (81 kg) | 4.59 | Jun 29, 2008 |
| Devin Street; WR | Recruit ratings: Scout: Rivals: (40) | | | | | |
| Fernando Diaz; OG | Bronx, New York | Cardinal Hayes HS | 6 ft 2 in (1.88 m) | 277 1/2 lb (125.9 kg) | 5.19 | Jul 21, 2008 |
| Fernando Diaz; OG | Recruit ratings: Scout: Rivals: (40) | | | | | |
| Kevin Adams; RB | Montvale, New Jersey | Saint Joseph Regional HS | 6 ft 0 in (1.83 m) | 208 lb (94 kg) | 4.66 | Aug 1, 2008 |
| Kevin Adams; RB | Recruit ratings: Scout: Rivals: (74) | | | | | |
| Carl Fleming; S | Reisterstown, Maryland | Franklin HS | 6 ft 1 in (1.85 m) | 195 1/2 lb (88.7 kg) | 4.47 | Aug 8, 2008 |
| Carl Fleming; S | Recruit ratings: Scout: Rivals: (40) | | | | | |
| Tyrone Ezell; DT | Homestead, Pennsylvania | Steel Valley HS | 6 ft 4 1/2 in (1.94 m) | 251 1/2 lb (114.1 kg) | 4.75 | Aug 9, 2008 |
| Tyrone Ezell; DT | Recruit ratings: Scout: Rivals: (77) | | | | | |
| Raymond Graham; RB | Elizabeth, New Jersey | Elizabeth HS | 5 ft 9 1/2 in (1.77 m) | 176 lb (80 kg) | 4.5 | Aug 16, 2008 |
| Raymond Graham; RB | Recruit ratings: Scout: Rivals: (77) | | | | | |
| Brock DeCicco; TE | Jefferson Hills, Pennsylvania | Thomas Jefferson HS | 6 ft 5 in (1.96 m) | 223 1/2 lb (101.4 kg) | 4.69 | Oct 12, 2008 |
| Brock DeCicco; TE | Recruit ratings: Scout: Rivals: (78) | | | | | |
| Todd Thomas; WR | Beaver Falls, Pennsylvania | Beaver Falls HS | 6 ft 2 1/2 in (1.89 m) | 201 lb (91 kg) | 4.55 | Oct 17, 2008 |
| Todd Thomas; WR | Recruit ratings: Scout: Rivals: (80) | | | | | |
| Jason Douglas; RB | Weston, Florida | Cypress Bay HS | 5 ft 6 1/2 in (1.69 m) | 164 1/2 lb (74.6 kg) | 4.44 | Nov 10, 2008 |
| Jason Douglas; RB | Recruit ratings: Scout: Rivals: (78) | | | | | |
| Ed Tinker; WR | Pittsburgh, Pennsylvania | North Carolina Tech Prep | 6 ft 2 1/2 in (1.89 m) | 215 lb (98 kg) | 4.5 | Dec 17, 2008 |
| Ed Tinker; WR | Recruit ratings: Scout: Rivals: (77) | | | | | |
| Jason Hendricks; RB | Jersey City, New Jersey | Hudson Catholic Regional HS | 5 ft 11 1/2 in (1.82 m) | 173 1/2 lb (78.7 kg) | 4.5 | Jan 11, 2009 |
| Jason Hendricks; RB | Recruit ratings: Scout: Rivals: (75) | | | | | |
| Kolby Gray; QB | Houston, Texas | Cypress Falls HS | 6 ft 2 in (1.88 m) | 187 1/2 lb (85.0 kg) | 4.53 | Jan 11, 2009 |
| Kolby Gray; QB | Recruit ratings: Scout: Rivals: (76) | | | | | |
| Bernard Nunez; DE | Hoboken, New Jersey | Hoboken HS | 6 ft 3 in (1.91 m) | 233 1/2 lb (105.9 kg) | 4.78 | Jan 20, 2009 |
| Bernard Nunez; DE | Recruit ratings: Scout: Rivals: (78) | | | | | |
| Dan Mason; MLB | Pittsburgh, Pennsylvania | Penn Hills HS | 6 ft 0 in (1.83 m) | 219 lb (99 kg) | 4.70 | Jan 22, 2009 |
| Dan Mason; MLB | Recruit ratings: Scout: Rivals: (76) | | | | | |
| Ryan Schlieper; OT | Wexford, Pennsylvania | North Allegheny SHS | 6 ft 5 1/2 in (1.97 m) | 278 lb (126 kg) | 5.00 | Feb 2, 2009 |
| Ryan Schlieper; OT | Recruit ratings: Scout: Rivals: (72) | | | | | |
Overall recruit ranking:
‡ Refers to 40-yard dash; Note: In many cases, Scout, Rivals, 247Sports, On3, and ESPN may conflict in their listings of height, weight and 40 time.; In these cases, the average was taken. ESPN grades are on a 100-point scale.; Sources: "Pittsburgh 2009 Football Commitments". Rivals.; "Scout.com Football Recruiting: Pittsburgh". Scout.; "Pittsburgh Panthers Football Recruiting 2009". ESPN.; "Scout.com Team Recruiting Rankings". Scout.; "2009 Team Ranking". Rivals.com.

=== Spring practices ===
Spring camp opened for the Panthers on March 19. Coach Wannstedt outlined his priorities heading into camp as determining the starters at running back and quarterback as well as the lineup at the various linebacker positions, most importantly in the middle.

The annual Blue-Gold game, the final scrimmage of spring camp, was played at Heinz Field on April 11. The University wanted to make it into a more appealing event for families and casual fans. As a result, they created various programs at the game, which was titled the "Pitt Spring Football Festival" in order to emphasize the various activities, which included a series of 20-minute "chalk talks" with coaches Wannstedt, Cignetti, and Bennett; an autograph session with former Panthers who went on to the NFL; and on-field drills with current players. Total attendance for the event was announced at 6,160.

“The defense has a lot of depth. One thing we learned today is our defensive line is a little ahead of our offensive line."

— Dave Wannstedt, following the spring blue-gold game

As expected, the defense controlled most of the play throughout, defeating the offense 54–23, using a modified scoring system. The offense scored only one touchdown, a 54-yard, play-action pass from Bill Stull to Jon Baldwin. Bill Stull was the most effective of all the quarterbacks, going 12 of 17 for 132 yards with the touchdown and an interception. Freshman Dion Lewis, who enrolled early in January 2009, led the offense on the ground with thirty-four yards on twelve attempts. The defense, after allowing a touchdown and a field goal on the offense's first and second possessions, respectively, finished with three interceptions and six sacks the rest of the way and didn't allow the offense to score again. The defense held the offense to a net of sixteen rushing yards on thirty-seven carries. The game was broadcast live locally on WPCW in Pittsburgh and was replayed nationally on April 18 on the NFL Network.

The Ed Conway Award, which is given to the most improved players of the spring, was co-awarded to quarterback Pat Bostick and linebacker Max Gruder prior to the Blue-Gold Game.

==== Off-field issues ====
Seniors T.J. Porter, a wide receiver, and Tommie Duhart, a defensive lineman, officially left Pitt's football team at the end of the spring semester; both had been suspended from spring practices and did not participate. Duhart, along with senior cornerback Aaron Berry and sophomore offensive lineman Wayne Jones, was suspended on April 7 from the remainder of spring practices as well as the Blue-Gold game due to an unspecified "violation of team policy". Porter had been suspended from the team indefinitely after being cited for driving on a suspended driver's license and driving while intoxicated, his second DWI in under ten months. According to a statement issued by coach Wannstedt, both Porter and Duhart plan to transfer elsewhere.

“I won't tolerate anything like that. I believe we have some great kids who made some mistakes, but they’ll be dealt with accordingly. And we’ll move forward."

— Dave Wannstedt, speaking about the various
off-field incidents in Spring 2009

A criminal complaint was filed against sophomore wide receiver and Aliquippa native Jon Baldwin on April 19, a day after the incident, in which Baldwin was charged with "indecent assault, harassment and disorderly conduct" following an incident with a female on a university-owned bus. Later in a non-jury trial in January, 2010, Baldwin was found not guilty on all charges.

Sixth year senior Adam Gunn, who only weeks earlier had been granted a sixth year of eligibility by the NCAA, was arrested in an incident that also involved former Panther Austin Ransom following an incident outside of a Pittsburgh night club. As a result of the charges against him – "misdemeanor charges of resisting arrest and failure to disperse, as well as summary offenses of disorderly conduct and public drunkenness" – Gunn was suspended from the team indefinitely pending the result of his hearing. All charges against Gunn were withdrawn at his preliminary hearing on June 16. According to Gunn's attorney, all charges were withdrawn due to the fact that "he employed no weapons, assaulted nobody and simply attempted to flee the scene".

=== Fall practice ===
The first official fall practice will open on Tuesday, August 11.

=== Award watchlists ===
Lombardi Award:

- Nate Byham, TE, Senior

Mackey Award:

- Nate Byham, Senior

Jim Thorpe Award:

- Aaron Berry, Senior

== Game summaries ==
=== Youngstown State ===
| Team | 1 | 2 | 3 | 4 | Total |
|---|---|---|---|---|---|
| Penguins | 0 | 3 | 0 | 0 | 3 |
| • Panthers | 7 | 14 | 10 | 7 | 38 |

- Date: September 5, 2009
- Location: Heinz Field, Pittsburgh, Pennsylvania
- Game start: 1:05 p.m. EST
- Elapsed time: 2:48
- Game attendance: 48,497
- Game weather: Sunny; 79 °F (26 °C); Wind 4 mph (6.4 km/h) NE
- Referee: Pat Garvey

Scoring summary
| Q1 | 7:31 | Pitt | Lewis 16-yd run (Hutchins PAT) | Pitt 7–0 |
| Q2 | 14:04 | YSU | Blose 48-yd FG | Pitt 7–3 |
| Q2 | 11:23 | Pitt | Lewis 1-yd run (Hutchins PAT) | Pitt 14–3 |
| Q2 | 1:05 | Pitt | Lewis 3-yd pass from Stull (Hutchins PAT) | Pitt 21–3 |
| Q3 | 3:42 | Pitt | Hutchins 26-yd FG | Pitt 24–3 |
| Q3 | 0:24 | Pitt | Dickerson 13-yd pass from Stull (Hutchins PAT) | Pitt 31–3 |
| Q4 | 12:05 | Pitt | Wright 6-yd pass from Sunseri (Hutchins PAT) | Pitt 38–3 |

The 2009 season opener against Youngstown State was the Penguins' first trip to Pittsburgh since 2005, when they were defeated by the Panthers by a score of 41–0 in the first-ever meeting between the schools. In this, the second matchup between the schools, the Panthers again won handily, this time by a score of 38–3. The Panthers were led by true freshman running back Dion Lewis, who had fifteen carries for 132 yards in the first half. Their Panthers played both of their top two quarterbacks. Bill Stull, a fifth‑year senior and the returning starter, played for the entire first half and a portion of the third quarter and was booed by the home fans on several occasions, likely because of his on‑field struggles dating back to the previous season. Redshirt freshman Tino Sunseri played the remainder of the game. The Panthers outgained the Penguins 390–159 on the day.

=== Buffalo ===
| Team | 1 | 2 | 3 | 4 | Total |
|---|---|---|---|---|---|
| • Panthers | 20 | 14 | 6 | 14 | 54 |
| Bulls | 7 | 13 | 0 | 7 | 27 |

- Date: September 12, 2009
- Location: UB Stadium, Amherst, New York
- Game start: 12:00 p.m. EST
- Elapsed time: 3:14
- Game attendance: 21,870
- Game weather: Cloudy; 68 °F (20 °C); wind 9 mph (14 km/h) NNE
- Referee: Tom Tomczyk
- TV announcers (ESPN networks): Jim Barbar and Doug Chapman

Scoring summary
| Q1 | 10:06 | Pitt | Dickerson 10-yd pass from Stull (Hutchins PAT) | Pitt 7–0 |
| Q1 | 9:54 | Pitt | Dickerson 23-yd pass from Stull (Hutchins PAT) | Pitt 14–0 |
| Q1 | 5:55 | Pitt | Rack 24-yd pass from Maynard (Principe PAT) | Pitt 14–7 |
| Q1 | 0:21 | UB | Lewis 7-yd run (Hutchins PAT failed) | Pitt 20–7 |
| Q2 | 8:31 | Pitt | Dickerson 9-yd pass from Stull (Hutchins PAT) | Pitt 27–7 |
| Q2 | 5:38 | UB | Roosevelt 54-yd pass from Maynard (Principe PAT) | Pitt 27–14 |
| Q2 | 1:09 | Pitt | Stull 3-yd run (Hutchins PAT) | Pitt 34–14 |
| Q2 | 0:33 | UB | Roosevelt 67-yd pass from Maynard (Principe PAT failed) | Pitt 34–20 |
| Q3 | 8:42 | Pitt | G. Williams 50-yd fumble recovery (Hutchins PAT failed) | Pitt 40–20 |
| Q4 | 11:32 | UB | Thermilus 12-yd pass from Maynard (Principe PAT) | Pitt 40–27 |
| Q4 | 4:44 | Pitt | Lewis 85-yd run (Hutchins PAT) | Pitt 47–27 |
| Q4 | 3:20 | Pitt | Graham 2-yd run (Hutchins PAT) | Pitt 54–27 |

The Panthers traveled to Buffalo to take on the Bulls, who were coming off a 23–17 Week 1 win at UTEP, in a game that was both the Panthers' first-ever trip to Buffalo and first road game of the season. The Panthers defeated the Bulls 54–27 and took advantage of four Bulls turnovers, which led to 27 Panther points, with linebacker Greg Williams returning one fumble 50 yards for a touchdown. The Panther offense gained 381 yards and committed no turnovers. Dion Lewis had his second straight 100-yard rushing game, gaining 236 total yards and scoring two touchdowns, including an 85-yard touchdown run, and Dorin Dickerson finished with eight catches for 71 yards and three touchdowns. The Panthers' 54 points was the highest offensive output during Dave Wannstedt's tenure at Pitt, which began in 2005; it was Pitt's highest output since scoring 55 points against Temple in 1999. However, the Bulls gained 500 yards of total offense on the day, and Buffalo quarterback Zach Maynard, who was making only his second career start, threw for 400 yards, a Buffalo record dating back to their re-ascension to Division I-A/FBS in 1999, and four touchdowns, which tied a Buffalo record during the same time, connecting with wide receiver Naaman Roosevelt on touchdowns of 67 and 54 yards. Pitt was penalized 11 times for 119 yards. Panthers starting free safety Andrew Taglianetti, who recovered a fumble in the first quarter, left the game with a torn ACL in his left knee and is taking a medical redshirt for the season.

=== Navy ===
| Team | 1 | 2 | 3 | 4 | Total |
|---|---|---|---|---|---|
| Midshipmen | 7 | 0 | 0 | 7 | 14 |
| • Panthers | 7 | 14 | 3 | 3 | 27 |

- Date: September 19, 2009
- Location: Heinz Field, Pittsburgh, Pennsylvania
- Game start: 6:05 p.m. EST
- Elapsed time: 2:55
- Game attendance: 55,064
- Game weather: Sunny w/ light clouds; 73 °F (23 °C); wind 5 mph (8.0 km/h) ENE
- Referee: Gary Patterson
- TV announcers (ESPN360): Drew Haddad and John Sanders

Scoring summary
| Q1 | 8:31 | Pitt | Turner 6-yd pass from Stull (Hutchins PAT) | Pitt 7–0 |
| Q1 | 0:19 | Navy | Dobbs 1-yd run (Buckley PAT) | Tied 7–7 |
| Q2 | 13:40 | Pitt | Graham 15-yd run (Hutchins PAT) | Pitt 14–7 |
| Q2 | 1:10 | Pitt | Lewis 6-yd run (Hutchins PAT) | Pitt 21–7 |
| Q3 | 3:22 | Pitt | Hutchins 29-yd FG | Pitt 24–7 |
| Q4 | 11:27 | Navy | Curry 4-yd run (Buckley PAT) | Pitt 24–14 |
| Q4 | 5:02 | Pitt | Hutchins 18-yd FG | Pitt 27–14 |

The Panthers and Midshipmen face one another for the third consecutive season and have traded road victories over the previous two meetings, the Panthers winning 42–21 in Annapolis in 2008 and the Midshipmen winning 48–45 in overtime in Pittsburgh in 2007. The 2009 meeting was much lower scoring, the Panthers coming out on top 27–14. The win saw the Panthers improve their record to 3–0, the team's best start since 2000. The Midshipmen were expected to pass the ball with greater effectiveness under new quarterback Ricky Dobbs, but Navy was held to 89 passing yards. Navy led the nation in rushing yards per game during the previous four seasons as well as through the first three weeks of 2009, but were held to only 129 rushing yards against the Panthers, significantly lower than their 240-yard average coming into the game. The Pitt offense was much more effective than the Midshipmen, outgaining them 369–218.

Bill Stull, who saw limited action in the second half, finished the day 17-for-24 with 245 yards through the air, including 20 to himself when he caught his own tipped pass out of the air and scrambled downfield, almost scoring a touchdown; he almost scored a touchdown on the play but turned the ball over when he fumbled and Navy recovered at their own one yard line. Stull was 12-for-14 with 189 yards and one touchdown in the first half. Dion Lewis didn't quite have the same strong statistical performance, compiling 79 yards and one touchdown on the ground, but Navy linebacker Ross Pospisil complimented Lewis after the game, saying that he "thought Dion Lewis was almost as a good as McCoy", referring to LeSean McCoy's 156-yard, three-touchdown game against Navy in 2008. True freshman middle linebacker Dan Mason made his first start and made 11 tackles, including two sacks, which earned him Big East Defensive Player of the Week honors.

=== NC State ===
| Team | 1 | 2 | 3 | 4 | Total |
|---|---|---|---|---|---|
| Panthers | 10 | 7 | 14 | 0 | 31 |
| • Wolfpack | 7 | 3 | 14 | 14 | 38 |

- Date: September 26, 2009
- Location: Carter–Finley Stadium, Raleigh, North Carolina
- Game start: 3:30 p.m. EST
- Elapsed time: 3:13
- Game attendance: 57,583
- Game weather: Dank and dreary, rain; 67 °F (19 °C); wind 8 mph (13 km/h) ENE
- Referee: John McDaid
- TV announcers (ESPNU): Todd Harris and Charles Arbuckle

Scoring summary
| 1Q | 13:02 | Pitt | Lewis 6-yd run (Hutchins PAT) | Pitt 7–0 |
| 1Q | 9:08 | Pitt | Hutchins 35-yd FG | Pitt 10–0 |
| 1Q | 2:39 | NCS | Gentry 23-yd pass from Wilson (Czajkowski PAT) | Pitt 10–7 |
| 2Q | 12:11 | Pitt | Lewis 7-yd run (Hutchins PAT) | Pitt 17–7 |
| 2Q | 0:00 | NCS | Czajkowski 25-yd FG | Pitt 17–10 |
| 3Q | 12:36 | NCS | Baker 38-yd pass from Wilson (Czajkowski PAT) | Tied 17–17 |
| 3Q | 10:03 | Pitt | Saddler 13-yd pass from Stull (Hutchins PAT) | Pitt 24–17 |
| 3Q | 4:15 | Pitt | Baldwin 79-yd pass from Stull (Hutchins PAT) | Pitt 31–17 |
| 3Q | 2:44 | NCS | Williams 33-yd pass from Wilson (Czajkowski PAT) | Pitt 31–24 |
| 4Q | 12:26 | NCS | Bryan 7-yd pass from Wilson (Czajkowski PAT) | Tied 31–31 |
| 4Q | 6:28 | NCS | Baker 2-yd run (Czajkowski PAT) | NCS 38–31 |

Pitt's trip to NC State was the Panthers' first trip to Raleigh since 1988 when the Panthers lost to the Wolfpack, 14–3, and the first overall matchup between the schools since the 2001 Tangerine Bowl, where the Panthers defeated the Wolfpack 34–19. Coming into the game, Pitt held a 5–2–1 advantage over NC State, dating back to the schools' first matchup in 1952.

The Panthers seized an early advantage in the game, jumping out to a 10–0 lead within the first six minutes of the game. The Panthers received the opening kickoff and were set up just across midfield after a Cameron Saddler return; the Panthers then scored the opening touchdown after only a four-play drive that was aided by a 15-yard personal foul penalty against NC State. The Wolfpack went three-and-out, and the Panthers second possession ended with a 35-yard field goal by Dan Hutchins. Going forward through the third quarter, both teams moved the ball on offense with relative ease and at which point the Panthers offense would fail to continue to produce. The teams ultimately combined for 830 total yards by the end of the game. NC State's Russell Wilson led the way, throwing for 322 yards and four touchdowns while also rushing for 91 yards. Wilson came into the game holding the NCAA record for pass attempts without an interception, and he increased his record by not throwing an interception against the Panthers.

The Panthers had built a 14-point lead near the end of the third quarter after Bill Stull connected with Jon Baldwin for a 79-yard pass, but the Panthers never scored again as NC State scored three consecutive touchdowns for the 38–31 win. The Wolfpack's come-from-behind scores came on drives of 45, 83, and 71 yards.

=== Louisville ===
| Team | 1 | 2 | 3 | 4 | Total |
|---|---|---|---|---|---|
| • Panthers | 7 | 0 | 14 | 14 | 35 |
| Cardinals | 7 | 3 | 0 | 0 | 10 |

- Date: October 10, 2009
- Location: Papa John's Cardinal Stadium, Louisville, Kentucky
- Game start: 8:00 p.m. EST
- Elapsed time: 3:07
- Game attendance: 39,948
- Game weather: Partly Cloudy; 62 °F (17 °C); wind 10 mph (16 km/h) SW
- Referee: G. McGinn
- TV announcers (ESPN2): Joe Tessitore and Rod Gilmore

Scoring summary
| 1Q | 7:15 | UL | Tronzo 1-yd run (Payne PAT) | UL 7–0 |
| 1Q | 3:48 | Pitt | Dickerson 5-yd pass from Stull (Hutchins PAT) | Tied 7–7 |
| 2Q | 0:03 | UL | Payne 32-yd kick | UL 10–7 |
| 3Q | 10:57 | Pitt | Dickerson 37-yd pass from Stull (Hutchins PAT) | Pitt 14–10 |
| 3Q | 6:35 | Pitt | Baldwin 71-yd pass from Stull (Hutchins PAT) | Pitt 21–10 |
| 4Q | 8:47 | Pitt | Graham 5-yd run (Hutchins PAT) | Pitt 28–10 |
| 4Q | 3:17 | Pitt | Hynoski 3-yd run (Hutchins PAT) | Pitt 35–10 |

=== Connecticut ===
| Team | 1 | 2 | 3 | 4 | Total |
|---|---|---|---|---|---|
| Huskies | 0 | 7 | 14 | 0 | 21 |
| • Panthers | 3 | 0 | 10 | 11 | 24 |

- Date: October 10, 2009
- Location: Heinz Field, Pittsburgh, Pennsylvania
- Game start: 3:30 p.m. EST
- Elapsed time: 3:01
- Game attendance: 44,893
- Game weather: Partly Sunny; 57.3 °F (14.1 °C); wind 5 mph (8.0 km/h) WNW
- Referee: Dennis Hennigan
- TV announcers (ABC/ESPN): Mike Patrick and Craig James

Scoring summary
| 1Q | 4:00 | Pitt | Hutchins 42-yd FG | Pitt 3–0 |
| 2Q | 2:46 | Conn | Easley 79-yd pass from Endres (Teggart PAT) | Conn 7–3 |
| 3Q | 11:22 | Conn | Vaughn 20-yd INT return (Teggart PAT) | Conn 14–3 |
| 3Q | 7:49 | Pitt | Hutchins 19-yd FG | Conn 14–6 |
| 3Q | 3:56 | Conn | Dixon 2-yd run (Teggart PAT) | Conn 21–6 |
| 3Q | 0:12 | Pitt | Baldwin 27-yd pass from Stull (Hutchins PAT) | Conn 21–13 |
| 4Q | 7:35 | Pitt | Dickerson 27-yd pass from Stull (McGee 2-pt pass from Stull) | Tied 21–21 |
| 4Q | 0:00 | Pitt | Hutchins 18-yd FG | Pitt 24–21 |

=== Rutgers ===
| Team | 1 | 2 | 3 | 4 | Total |
|---|---|---|---|---|---|
| • Panthers | 7 | 10 | 7 | 0 | 24 |
| Scarlet Knights | 7 | 3 | 0 | 7 | 17 |

- Date: October 16, 2009
- Location: Rutgers Stadium, Piscataway, New Jersey
- Game start: 8:00 p.m. EST
- Elapsed time: 3:22
- Game attendance: 50,296
- Game weather: Overcast w/ showers; 45 °F (7 °C); wind 12 mph (19 km/h) NE
- Referee: Pat Garvey
- TV announcers (ESPN): Joe Tessitore and Rod Gilmore

Scoring summary
| 1Q | 12:36 | RU | Sanu 11-yd run (Te PAT) | RU 7–0 |
| 1Q | 9:41 | Pitt | Dickerson 7-yd pass from Stull (Hutchins PAT) | Tied 7–7 |
| 2Q | 11:29 | Pitt | Hutchins 19-yd FG | Pitt 10–7 |
| 2Q | 3:24 | Pitt | Lewis 1-yd run (Hutchins PAT) | Pitt 17–7 |
| 2Q | 0:00 | RU | Te 23-yd FG | Pitt 17–10 |
| 3Q | 5:19 | Pitt | Lewis 58-yd run (Hutchins PAT) | Pitt 24–10 |
| 4Q | 9:37 | RU | Brown 19-yd pass from Savage (Te PAT) | Pitt 24–17 |

=== South Florida ===
| Team | 1 | 2 | 3 | 4 | Total |
|---|---|---|---|---|---|
| Bulls | 0 | 7 | 0 | 7 | 14 |
| • No. 20 Panthers | 7 | 24 | 3 | 7 | 41 |

- Date: October 24, 2009
- Location: Heinz Field, Pittsburgh, Pennsylvania
- Game start: 12:10 p.m. EST
- Elapsed time: 3:03
- Game attendance: 50,019
- Game weather: Mostly Cloudy; 62 °F (17 °C); wind 9 mph (14 km/h) WSW
- Referee: Jeff Maconaghy
- TV announcers (ESPN networks): Mike Gleason, John Congemi, and Quint Kessenich

Scoring summary
| 1Q | 4:30 | Pitt | Cruz 2-yd pass from Stull (Hutchins PAT) | Pitt 7–0 |
| 2Q | 14:53 | Pitt | Baldwin 40-yd pass from Stull (Hutchins PAT) | Pitt 14–0 |
| 2Q | 10:35 | USF | Ford 3-yd run (Schwartz PAT) | Pitt 14–7 |
| 2Q | 8:01 | Pitt | Lewis 1-yd run (Hutchins PAT) | Pitt 21–7 |
| 2Q | 2:53 | Pitt | Hutchins 36-yd FG | Pitt 24–7 |
| 2Q | 0:19 | Pitt | Lewis 1-yd run (Hutchins PAT) | Pitt 31–7 |
| 3Q | 1:24 | Pitt | Hutchins 32-yd FG | Pitt 34–7 |
| 4Q | 10:37 | Pitt | Dickerson 5-yd pass from Sunseri (Hutchins PAT) | Pitt 41–7 |
| 4Q | 0:10 | USF | Bogan 20-yd pass from Landi (Schwartz PAT) | Pitt 41–14 |

The October 24 game against South Florida was Pitt's homecoming, and the Panthers were seeking their first 7–1 start since 1982. The game was expected to be close and competitive, but the Panthers dominated throughout, winning 41–14. Pitt jumped out to a 31–7 lead by the end of the first half, in which Pitt scored on all five of its offensive possessions – four touchdowns and one field goal. Bill Stull, who finished 18 of 25 for 245 yards and two touchdown passes, wasn't sacked on the day and completed his first 11 passes of the game. Following the game, Stull gave the credit for the team's success on offense to his teammates, citing their ability to both block Bulls defenders as well as get open for passes.

Dion Lewis continued his strong freshman campaign by adding yards and two touchdowns, topping 1,000 for the season in the process.

=== Syracuse ===
| Team | 1 | 2 | 3 | 4 | Total |
|---|---|---|---|---|---|
| Orange | 3 | 0 | 0 | 7 | 10 |
| • No. 13 Panthers | 3 | 10 | 14 | 10 | 37 |

- Date: November 7, 2009
- Location: Heinz Field, Pittsburgh, Pennsylvania
- Game start: 12:00 p.m. EST
- Elapsed time: 3:09
- Game attendance: 46,885
- Game weather: Mostly sunny; 61 °F (16 °C); wind 12 mph (19 km/h) SSW
- Referee: John McDaid
- TV announcers (ESPNU): Clay Matvick and David Diaz-Infante

Scoring summary
| 1Q | 12:21 | SU | Lichtenstein 29-yd FG | SU 3–0 |
| 1Q | 8:05 | Pitt | Hutchins 19-yd FG | Tied 3–3 |
| 2Q | 9:24 | Pitt | Hutchins 45-yd FG | Pitt 6–3 |
| 2Q | 1:20 | Pitt | G. Williams 51-yd INT (Hutchins PAT) | Pitt 13–3 |
| 3Q | 10:38 | Pitt | Lewis 1-yd run (Hutchins PAT) | Pitt 20–3 |
| 3Q | 6:37 | Pitt | Dickerson 14-yd pass from Stull (Hutchins PAT) | Pitt 27–3 |
| 4Q | 11:03 | Pitt | Hutchins 33-yd FG | Pitt 30–3 |
| 4Q | 5:47 | Pitt | McGee 29-yd run (Hutchins PAT) | Pitt 37–3 |
| 4Q | 1:03 | SU | Collier 1-yd run (Lichtenstein PAT) | Pitt 37–10 |

=== Notre Dame ===
| Team | 1 | 2 | 3 | 4 | Total |
|---|---|---|---|---|---|
| Fighting Irish | 0 | 3 | 0 | 19 | 22 |
| • No. 12 Panthers | 3 | 7 | 10 | 7 | 27 |

- Date: November 14, 2009
- Location: Heinz Field, Pittsburgh, Pennsylvania
- Game start: 8:00 p.m. EST
- Elapsed time: 3:11
- Game attendance: 65,374
- Game weather: Mostly clear; 58 °F (14 °C); wind 3 mph (4.8 km/h) WSW
- Referee: Thomas Tomczyk
- TV announcers (ABC): Brent Musburger, Kirk Herbstreit, and Lisa Salters

Scoring summary
| 1Q | 9:40 | Pitt | Hutchins 34-yd FG | Pitt 3–0 |
| 2Q | 5:40 | ND | Ruffer 42-yd FG | Tied 3–3 |
| 2Q | 2:31 | Pitt | Baldwin 38-yd pass from Stull (Hutchins PAT) | Pitt 10–3 |
| 3Q | 9:15 | Pitt | Hutchins 38-yd FG | Pitt 13–3 |
| 3Q | 6:36 | Pitt | Graham 2-yd run (Hutchins PAT) | Pitt 20–3 |
| 4Q | 14:56 | ND | Clausen 1-yd run (Ruffer PAT blocked) | Pitt 20–9 |
| 4Q | 12:44 | Pitt | Lewis 50-yd run (Hutchins PAT) | Pitt 27–9 |
| 4Q | 9:10 | ND | Tate 18-yd pass from Clausen (Ruffer PAT) | Pitt 27–16 |
| 4Q | 7:16 | ND | Tate 87-yd punt return (Clausen 2-point pass incomplete) | Pitt 27–22 |

=== West Virginia ===
Backyard Brawl

| Team | 1 | 2 | 3 | 4 | Total |
|---|---|---|---|---|---|
| No. 9 Panthers | 0 | 3 | 3 | 10 | 16 |
| • Mountaineers | 0 | 3 | 10 | 6 | 19 |

- Date: November 27, 2009
- Location: Milan Puskar Stadium, Morgantown, West Virginia
- Game start: 7:05 p.m. EST
- Elapsed time: 3:10
- Game attendance: 56,123
- Game weather: Cloudy; 36 °F (2 °C); wind 5 mph (8.0 km/h) WSW
- Referee: Dennis Hennigan
- TV announcers (ESPN2): Mark Jones, Bob Davie, and David Amber

Scoring summary
| 2Q | 3:21 | Pitt | Hutchins 37-yd FG | Pitt 3–0 |
| 2Q | 0:05 | WVU | Bitancurt 20-yd FG | Tied 3–3 |
| 3Q | 9:18 | WVU | Bitancurt 43-yd FG | WVU 6–3 |
| 3Q | 4:52 | Pitt | Hutchins 30-yd FG | Tied 6–6 |
| 3Q | 4:34 | WVU | Devine 88-yd run (Bitancurt PAT) | WVU 13–6 |
| 4Q | 10:05 | WVU | Bitancurt 39-yd FG | WVU 16–6 |
| 4Q | 7:37 | Pitt | Hutchins 36-yd FG | WVU 16–9 |
| 4Q | 2:54 | Pitt | Baldwin 50-yd pass from Stull (Hutchins PAT) | Tied 16–16 |
| 4Q | 0:00 | WVU | Bitancurt 43-yd FG | WVU 19–16 |

=== Cincinnati ===
River City Rivalry

| Team | 1 | 2 | 3 | 4 | Total |
|---|---|---|---|---|---|
| • No. 5 Bearcats | 7 | 10 | 7 | 21 | 45 |
| No. 15 Panthers | 7 | 24 | 0 | 13 | 44 |

- Date: December 5, 2009
- Location: Heinz Field, Pittsburgh, Pennsylvania
- Game start: 12:00 p.m. EST
- Elapsed time: 3:34
- Game attendance: 63,387
- Game weather: Cloudy w/ snow flurries; 30 °F (−1 °C); wind 4 mph (6.4 km/h) NNE
- Referee: Gerard McGinn
- TV announcers (ABC): Sean McDonough, Matt Millen, and Holly Rowe

Scoring summary
| 1Q | 7:27 | Pitt | Lewis 4-yd run (Hutchins PAT) | Pitt 7–0 |
| 1Q | 5:17 | UC | Ramsey 2-yd run (Rogers PAT) | Tied 7–7 |
| 2Q | 14:13 | Pitt | Baldwin 22-yd pass from Stull (Hutchins PAT) | Pitt 14–7 |
| 2Q | 11:12 | UC | Rogers 20-yd FG | Pitt 14–10 |
| 2Q | 10:28 | Pitt | Baldwin 40-yd pass from Stull (Hutchins PAT) | Pitt 21–10 |
| 2Q | 4:53 | Pitt | Hutchins 33-yd FG | Pitt 24–10 |
| 2Q | 1:26 | Pitt | Stull 3-yd run (Hutchins PAT) | Pitt 31–10 |
| 2Q | 1:10 | UC | Gilyard 99-yd kickoff return (Rogers PAT) | Pitt 31–17 |
| 3Q | 8:12 | UC | Gilyard 68-yd pass from Pike (Rogers PAT) | Pitt 31–24 |
| 4Q | 12:26 | Pitt | Lewis 15-yd run (Hutchins PAT) | Pitt 38–24 |
| 4Q | 11:09 | UC | Woods 8-yd pass from Pike (Rogers PAT failed) | Pitt 38–30 |
| 4Q | 5:46 | UC | Pead 1-yd run (Gilyard 2-pt pass from Pike) | Tied 38–38 |
| 4Q | 1:36 | Pitt | Lewis 5-yd run (Janocko 2-pt rush failed) | Pitt 44–38 |
| 4Q | 0:33 | UC | Binns 29-yd pass from Pike (Rogers PAT) | UC 45–44 |

The winner of the 2009 River City Rivalry, the Cincinnati Bearcats won the Big East Conference and earned the conference berth in the Bowl Championship Series, while Pitt's loss dropped the team to tie third in the conference with West Virginia after West Virginia defeated Rutgers that same day. After the loss, Pitt lead the all-time series against Cincinnati, 7–2, with the Bearcats winning the previous year.

=== North Carolina ===
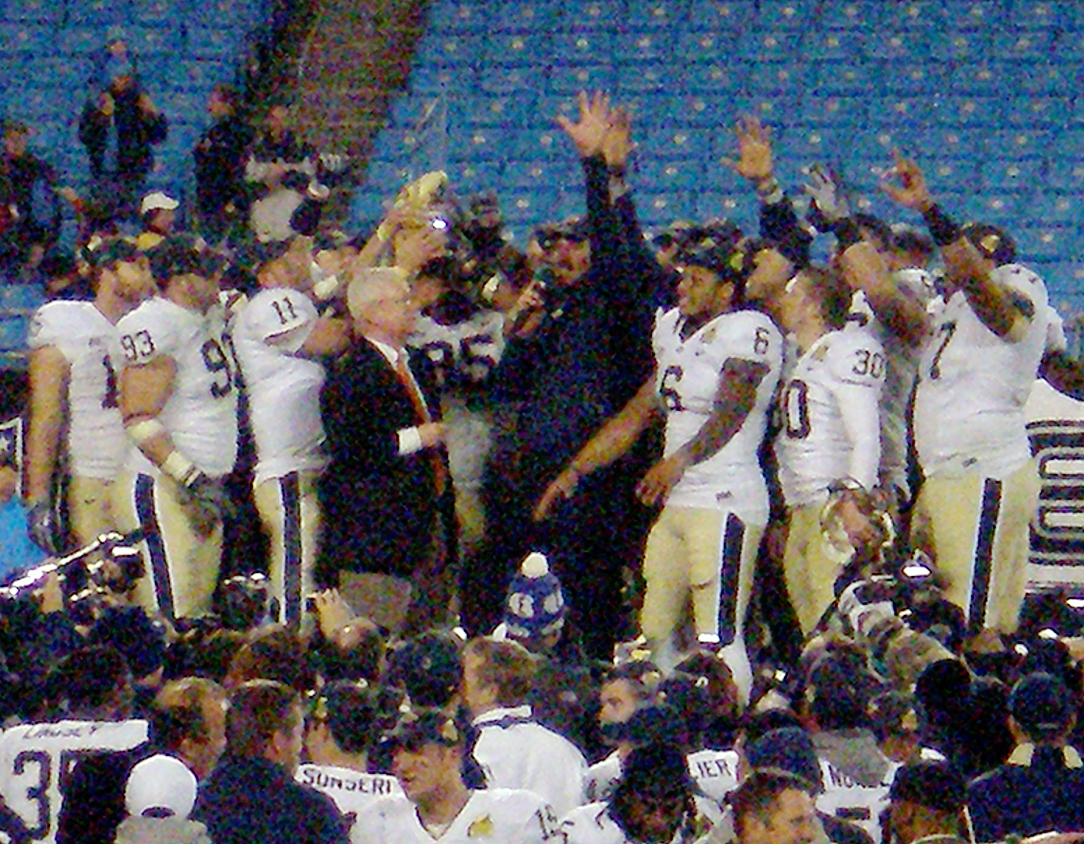
Dave Wannstedt addresses the crowd during the trophy presentation following the 2009 Meineke Car Care Bowl, in which Pitt defeated North Carolina 19-17

2009 Meineke Car Care Bowl

| Team | 1 | 2 | 3 | 4 | Total |
|---|---|---|---|---|---|
| Tar Heels | 7 | 3 | 7 | 0 | 17 |
| • No. 17 Panthers | 0 | 13 | 3 | 3 | 19 |

- Date: December 26, 2009
- Location: Bank of America Stadium, Charlotte, North Carolina
- Game start: 4:35 p.m. EST
- Elapsed time: 3:07
- Game attendance: 50,389
- Game weather: Overcast; 47 °F (8 °C); wind WSW 5 mph (8.0 km/h)
- Referee: RG Detillier (C-USA)
- TV announcers (ESPN/ISP Sports): Bob Wischusen, Bob Griese, Chris Spielman, and Quint Kessenich/Alan York and Sonny Randle

== Personnel ==
=== Coaching staff ===
2009 Pittsburgh Panthers football staff
| Coaching staff: Dave Wannstedt – Head coach; Greg Gattuso – Assistant head coach/defensive line; Frank Cignetti, Jr. – Offensive coordinator/quarterbacks; Phil Bennett – Defensive coordinator; Brian Angelichio – Tight ends; Bryan Bossard – Wide receivers; Jeff Hafley – Secondary; Joe Tumpkin – Linebackers; David Walker – Running backs; Tony Wise – Offensive line | Support staff: Chris Lasala – Assistant athletic director/football operations; Mike Antonoplos – Assistant director of football operations; Bob Junko – Director of football operations and program enhancement; Scott Turner – Offensive assistant; Rod Rutherford – Defensive assistant | Strength and conditioning staff: Buddy Morris – Strength and conditioning coach; James Smith – Assistant strength and conditioning coach; Chad Lee – Assistant strength and conditioning coach |

=== Roster ===
2009 Pittsburgh Panthers roster
| Quarterbacks: 4 Andrew Janocko, RS So; 11 Bill Stull, RS Sr; 12 Tino Sunseri, RS Fr; 14 Greg Cross, (redshirt) Sr; 16 (injured) Kolby Gray, (redshirt) Fr; 19 Pat Bostick, (redshirt) Jr; Tailbacks: 9 Jason Douglas, (redshirt) Fr; 24 Kevin Collier, RS Jr; 28 Dion Lewis, Fr; 29 Chris Burns, RS Fr; 34 Ray Graham, Fr; 43 Shariff Harris, RS So; Fullbacks: 27 Henry Hynoski, RS So; 37 Joe Capp, RS Jr; Wide receivers: 1 Cedric McGee, RS Sr; 5 Cameron Saddler, RS Fr; 10 Aundre Wright, RS So; 35 Caleb Wilson, RS Fr; 82 Jon Baldwin, So; 84 Ed Tinker, (redshirt) Fr; 86 Devin Street, (redshirt) Fr; 87 Mike Shanahan, RS Fr; 88 Oderick Turner, RS Sr; Tight ends: 2 Dorin Dickerson, Sr; 80 Nate Byham, Sr; 81 Brock DeCicco, (redshirt) Fr; 85 Mike Cruz, RS Fr; 92 Justin Virbitsky, RS Fr | Offensive linemen: 52 Lucas Nix, So; 54 Chris Jacobson, RS So; 56 Joe Thomas, Sr; 59 Keith Coleman, RS Fr; 60 Greg Gaskins, RS So; 61 Alex Karabin, RS Jr; 62 Fernando Diaz, (redshirt) Fr; 63 Wayne Jones, RS So; 64 Robb Houser, Sr; 66 Josh Novotny, RS Sr; 67 Dan Matha, RS So; 68 Jordan Gibbs, RS So; 69 Jared Martin, RS Jr; 70 Juantez Hollins, (redshirt) Fr; 71 John Fieger, RS So; 74 John Malecki, Sr; 75 Ryan Turnley, RS Fr; 76 Ryan Schlieper, (redshirt) Fr; 77 Jason Pinkston, RS Jr; 78 Cory King, (redshirt) Fr; Defensive linemen: 44 Nate Nix, RS Jr; 45 Tyler Tkach, RS Jr; 50 Tyrone Ezell, (redshirt) Fr; 51 Bernardo Nunez, (redshirt) Fr; 57 Craig Bokor, RS Sr; 72 Jack Lippert, (redshirt) Fr; 91 Greg Romeus, RS Jr; 93 Gus Mustakas, RS Sr; 94 Myles Caragein, RS So; 95 Mick Williams, RS Sr; 96 Justin Hargrove, RS So; 97 Jabaal Sheard, Jr; 98 Chas Alecxih, RS So | Linebackers: 6 Steve Dell, RS Sr; 8 Adam Gunn, RS Sr †; 15 Shane Murray, RS Sr; 30 Carl Fleming, (redshirt) Fr; 32 Tristan Roberts, RS So; 35 Brandon Lindsey, RS So; 36 Manny Williams, RS Fr; 38 Greg Williams, RS So; 40 Dan Mason, Fr; 43 Jon Taglianetti, RS Fr; 46 Shayne Hale, RS Fr; 49 Nick Tate, RS Fr; 53 Joe Trebitz, RS Fr; 55 Max Gruder, RS So; 58 Shane Gordon, (redshirt) Fr; Defensive backs: 1 Jeremiah Davis, RS Fr; 3 Aaron Smith, RS So; 4 Elijah Fields, RS Jr; 5 Dan Cafaro, RS Sr; 7 Jovani Chappel, Sr; 14 Marco Pecora, (redshirt) Fr; 17 Aaron Berry, Sr; 18 Jarred Holley, RS Fr; 20 Irvan Brown, RS Sr; 21 Buddy Jackson, RS So; 22 Antwuan Reed, So; 23 Kevin Adams, (redshirt) Fr; 25 Jason Hendricks, (redshirt) Fr; 26 Ricky Gary, RS Jr; 31 Dom DeCicco, Jr; 41 (injured) Andrew Taglianetti, (redshirt) So | Special teams: 24 Luke Briggs PK, RS Jr; 26 Aaron Hassett P, RS Fr; 30 Dan Hutchins PK, RS Jr; 38 Pat Costello P, RS Fr; 39 Kevin Harper PK, RS Fr; Classes Key: Fr – Freshman; first year player. So – Sophomore; second year player. Jr – Junior; third year player. Sr – Senior; fourth year player. RS – Previously used a redshirt. (redshirt) – Redshirt during 2009 season. (injured) – Injured for entire or majority of season and is eligible for a medical redshirt. † – 6th year of eligibility Roster |

== Awards ==
Several Panthers earned accolades following the close of the regular season with ten players earning first- or second-team honors in the Big East Conference. Additionally, tight end Dorin Dickerson was one of three finalists for the Mackey Award, which was won by Aaron Hernandez of Florida. Offensive line coach Tony Wise was also named the Offensive Line Coach of the Year by FootballScoop.com.

=== All-Americans ===
Dickerson was also named as a first team 2009 College Football All-American by the Football Writers Association of America and CBS Sports. Dickerson was the third All-American from Pitt in four seasons and the first All-American tight end from Pitt since Mike Ditka in 1960. CBS Sports also named Dion Lewis as their Freshman of the Year and a second-team All-American. Dickerson and several other teammates were also named to various other All-America teams.

| Athlete | Position | All-American accolades |
| Jon Baldwin | Wide receiver | Third team: Rivals.com; Honorable mention: Sports Illustrated |
| Dorin Dickerson | Tight end | First team: FWAA, CBS Sports; Second team: Sporting News, Walter Camp; Third team: Associated Press; Honorable mention: Sports Illustrated |
| Dion Lewis | Running back | Second team: Associated Press, CBS Sports, Rivals.com, Scout.com, Sporting News, Sports Illustrated |
| Jason Pinkston | Offensive tackle | Second team: Rivals.com, Sports Illustrated |
| Greg Romeus | Defensive end | Third team: Rivals.com, Sporting News; Honorable mention: Sports Illustrated |

=== Big East Conference awards ===
The Big East Conference awards were awarded by vote among conference coaches and were announced on December 9. True freshman Dion Lewis won two major conference awards, Offensive Player of the Year and Rookie of the Year, the first player to win two Big East awards since Michael Vick of Virginia Tech in 1999. Additionally, voting for the conference's Defensive Player of the Year award finished in a tie between the Panther duo of Mick Williams and Greg Romeus, who shared the award.

The Panthers on the all-Big East first and second teams are:

| First team | Second team |
|---|---|
| QB – Bill Stull (tied with Tony Pike); RB – Dion Lewis †; TE – Dorin Dickerson; WR – Jon Baldwin; OT – Jason Pinkston; OG – John Malecki; DE – Greg Romeus †; DT – Mick Williams; LB – Adam Gunn; CB – Aaron Berry | TE – Nate Byham; OT – Gus Mustakas; FS – Dom DeCicco; PK – Dan Hutchins |
† – indicates a unanimous selection.

== Team players drafted into the NFL ==
| Player | Position | Round | Pick | NFL club |
| Nate Byham | Tight end | 6 | 182 | San Francisco 49ers |
| Dorin Dickerson | Wide receiver | 7 | 227 | Houston Texans |
