= Brandon Lindsey =

American gridiron football player (born 1989)

No. 56
- Position: Linebacker

Personal information
- Born: January 10, 1989 (age 37); Aliquippa, Pennsylvania, U.S.
- Listed height: 6 ft 2 in (1.88 m)
- Listed weight: 250 lb (113 kg)

Career information
- High school: Aliquippa (PA) Senior
- College: Pittsburgh
- NFL draft: 2012: undrafted

Career history
- Pittsburgh Steelers (2012)*; Toronto Argonauts (2013)*; Sioux Falls Storm (2015)
- * Offseason or practice squad member only

Awards and highlights
- United Bowl champion (2015); Second-team All-Big East (2010)

Brandon Anthony Lindsey (born January 10, 1989) is an American former football linebacker.

== Early life ==
Lindsey attended Aliquippa Senior High School in Aliquippa, Pennsylvania, where he played both linebacker and running back. As a senior, he had 115 tackles on defense and rushed for 743 yards on offense.

== College career ==
Lindsey played collegiate football at the University of Pittsburgh in Pittsburgh, Pennsylvania. He was redshirted as a true freshman in 2007. In 2008, he played special teams and was a backup linebacker. In 2009, as a defensive end, he had 18 tackles and four sacks. He moved back to linebacker in 2010 and was named to the second-team all-Big East squad after recording 51 tackles and 10 sacks.

== Professional career ==
Pre-draft measurables
Height	Weight	40-yard dash	10-yard split	20-yard split	20-yard shuttle	Three-cone drill	Vertical jump	Broad jump	Bench press
6 ft 2 in (1.88 m)	254 lb (115 kg)	4.93 s	1.67 s	2.82 s	4.28 s	7.36 s	33 in (0.84 m)	9 ft 9 in (2.97 m)	23 reps
All values from NFL Combine

Although Lindsey was considered one of the best linebacker prospects in the 2012 NFL draft, he was not drafted. After the draft, he signed a free-agent contract with the Pittsburgh Steelers. On June 28, 2012, Lindsey was released by the Steelers.

Lindsey signed with the Toronto Argonauts of the Canadian Football League on July 15, 2013. He was released by the team on July 29, 2013.
