= E. J. Wilson =

American football player (born 1987)

No. 78, 97
- Position: Defensive tackle

Personal information
- Born: October 28, 1987 (age 39); Emporia, Virginia, U.S.
- Listed height: 6 ft 3 in (1.91 m)
- Listed weight: 289 lb (131 kg)

Career information
- High school: Brunswick (Lawrenceville, Virginia)
- College: North Carolina
- NFL draft: 2010: 4th round, 127th overall pick

Career history
- Seattle Seahawks (2010); Tampa Bay Buccaneers (2010–2011)

Career NFL statistics
- Total tackles: 1
- Stats at Pro Football Reference

Earl Wilson Jr. (born October 28, 1987) is an American former professional football player who was a defensive end in the National Football League (NFL). He played college football for the North Carolina Tar Heels and was selected by the Seattle Seahawks in the fourth round of the 2010 NFL draft.

== Professional career ==
=== Seattle Seahawks ===
Wilson was selected in the fourth round of the 2010 NFL draft by the Seattle Seahawks. He was signed to a four-year contract on June 17, 2010. He was cut on November 23, 2010 after posting one tackle in two games.

=== Tampa Bay Buccaneers ===
Wilson signed with the Tampa Bay Buccaneers for the 2011 NFL Training Camp. During the second preseason game, Wilson was injured after rupturing his Achilles tendon. He was ruled out for the season and was placed on Injured Reserve for the 2011 NFL Season. After being cut in 2012, Wilson retired, in part due to his treatment under new head coach Greg Schiano.
