= Jarrett Brown =

American football player (born 1987)

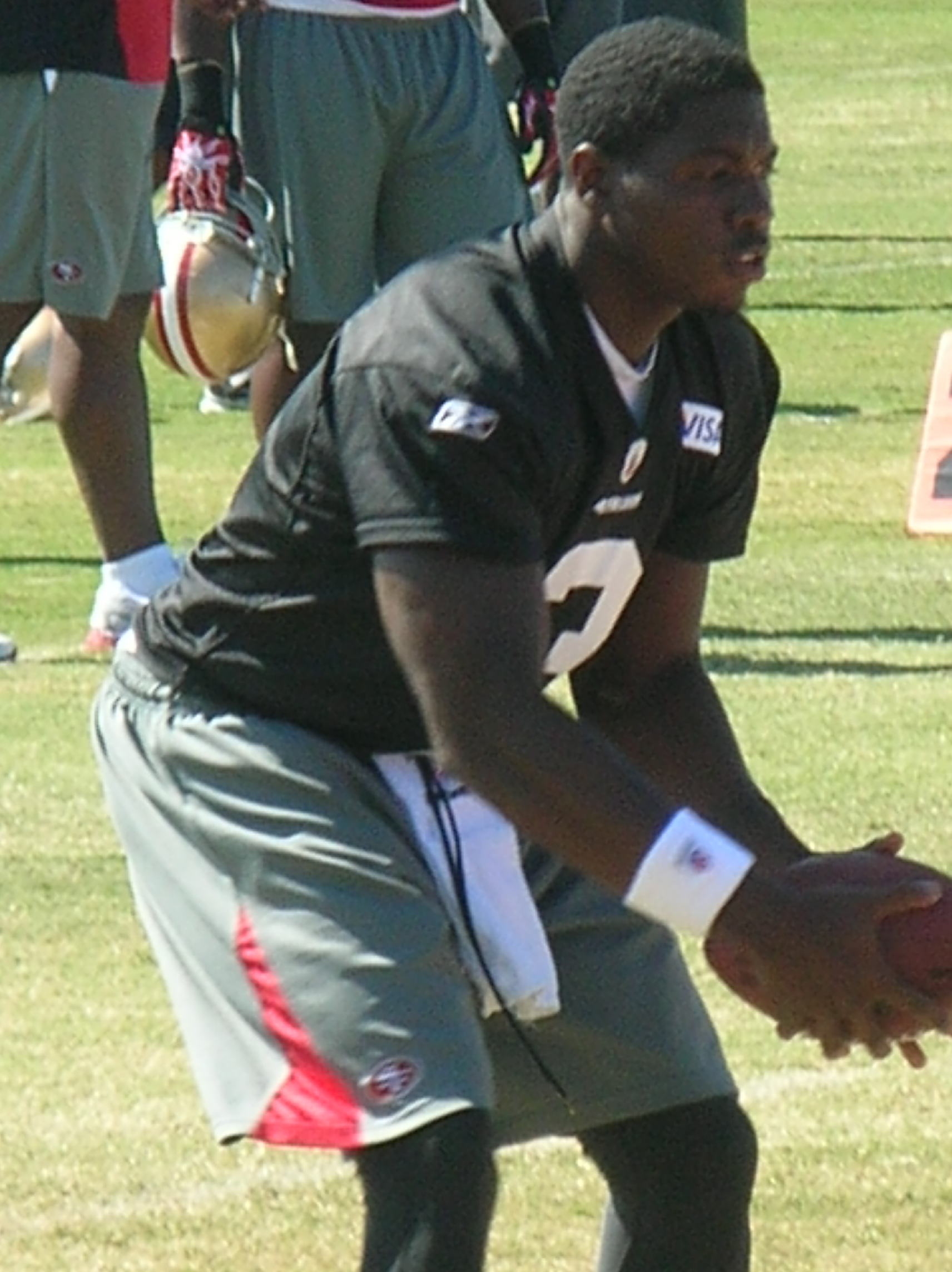
- Brown at 49ers training camp in 2010

No. 16, 3
- Position: Quarterback

Personal information
- Born: January 23, 1987 (age 39); West Palm Beach, Florida, U.S.
- Listed height: 6 ft 4 in (1.93 m)
- Listed weight: 224 lb (102 kg)

Career information
- High school: Palm Beach Lakes (West Palm Beach)
- College: West Virginia (2005–2009)
- NFL draft: 2010: undrafted

Career history
- San Francisco 49ers (2010)*; Cleveland Browns (2011)*; Indianapolis Colts (2011)*; BC Lions (2012–2013)*; Spokane Shock (2014–2015); West Virginia Roughriders (2019)
- * Offseason or practice squad member only

Awards and highlights
- AAL champion (2019)

Career AFL statistics
- Comp. / Att.: 15 / 26
- Passing yards: 173
- TD–INT: 2–3
- QB rating: 57.53
- Rushing touchdowns: 3
- Stats at ArenaFan.com
- Stats at Pro Football Reference
- Stats at CFL.ca (archive)

Jarrett Brown (born January 23, 1987) is an American former football player. A quarterback, he played college football for the West Virginia Mountaineers, and was signed by the San Francisco 49ers as an undrafted free agent in 2010. He served as the starting quarterback for the Mountaineers during the 2009 season after three seasons as the backup to Pat White. Brown was also a member of the Cleveland Browns, Indianapolis Colts, BC Lions, and Spokane Shock. In 2019, he signed with the West Virginia Roughriders.

== Early life ==
Brown was born in West Palm Beach, Florida, to trucking company owner James and mother Sherry Brown. He attended Palm Beach Lakes High School where he played football and basketball. Brown received a letter in basketball all four years. Over the course of his high school football career, Brown compiled more than 7,100 passing yards and 73 touchdowns. As a senior, he recorded 1,800 passing yards for 18 touchdowns, and 485 rushing yards. The Sun-Sentinel named him the player of the year and he was also named the all-state quarterback at the 6-A level. Rivals.com rated him a three-star prospect and the 12th-ranked dual-threat quarterback in the 2005 recruiting class. Brown received scholarship offers from Central Florida, Iowa, Minnesota, NC State, and West Virginia.

== College career ==
=== 2005 season ===
In 2005, Brown enrolled at West Virginia University where he studied athletic coaching education. He sat out his true freshman season on redshirt status after losing the competition for starting quarterback to Pat White. Brown said that he first found out about the decision by reading the team's website. He discussed transferring to another college with his family once but felt loyal to West Virginia, which was the first school to offer him an athletic scholarship and countenance his playing both football and basketball. Brown spent the offseason working out with the linebackers in the weight room and studying head coach Rich Rodriguez's playbook.

=== 2006 season ===
In 2006, Brown played in six games as a backup behind starting quarterback Pat White. Against Marshall, he scored a touchdown on a seven–yard quarterback keeper. Against Eastern Washington, he threw 11 completions on 15 attempts for 129 yards. Brown also saw some action in garbage time against Syracuse, Connecticut, and Cincinnati. Pat White was injured before the regular season finale, so Brown started against Rutgers. Brown completed 14 of 29 passes for 244 yards, one touchdown, and one interception. He also made 17 rushing attempts for 73 yards and one touchdown, and he was sacked twice. Brown threw the game-winning touchdown pass to win the game in triple overtime.

=== 2007 season ===
In 2007, Brown played in ten games as a reserve. He recorded 31 completions on 48 attempts for 341 yards, two touchdowns, and two interceptions. Brown also rushed 49 times for 327 yards and three touchdowns. Against South Florida, Brown was substituted for an injured White, and passed for 149 yards and a touchdown. After the football season, he played basketball for the Mountaineers and scored 13 points in as many games.

=== 2008 season ===
In 2008, Brown played in nine games, starting once. He recorded 22 completions on 30 attempts for 114 yards, one touchdown, and one interception. Brown and White alternated as the quarterback during the Rutgers game, with Brown being utilized often in short-yardage situations. He said, "Whatever gets me on the field and whatever helps this team, I enjoy it, I'm just playing my role." White was eventually knocked out of that game by injury, and Brown replaced him for the remainder and led West Virginia to win, 24–17. After the season, Brown joined the basketball team, but eventually re-dedicated his focus on football.

=== 2009 season ===
With the graduation of Pat White, Brown was promoted to the starting position for the 2009 season. Against East Carolina, Brown led the Mountaineers to a 35–20 victory and completed 24 of 31 pass attempts for 334 yards and four touchdowns. For his performance, the Big East Conference named him the Offensive Player of the Week. The following week, West Virginia lost to Auburn, 41–30. Brown completed 18 of 32 passes for 221 yards and one touchdown, but also threw four interceptions and lost one fumble. After the game, head coach Bill Stewart defended Brown and said, "He's learning, and we've got a lot of football to play. And I'm glad Jarrett Brown is my quarterback." The Charleston Gazette wrote, "Did he take some chances? Yes, and a bunch of them paid off, which is why West Virginia led most of the game." Against Colorado, West Virginia overcame a string of four consecutive fumbles in the first quarter, including one by Brown, to win 35–24. Head coach Stewart credited Brown and running back Noel Devine with keeping the offense's composure.

Brown was injured early in the Marshall game, and replaced by true freshman quarterback Eugene "Geno" Smith. Brown suffered a mild concussion from a helmet-to-helmet hit from two defensive backs, but returned for the next game against Connecticut. Brown completed 19 of 32 passes for 205 yards and one interception in the loss to South Florida, which snapped West Virginia's four-game winning streak. He threw one touchdown pass against Louisville, but the Mountaineers offense struggled to a 17–9 win. Offensive coordinator Jeff Mullen attributed a drop-off in Brown's performance from earlier in the season to a string of minor injuries. Brown scored touchdowns on a three-yard pass and an eight-yard run in a losing 24–21 effort against fifth-ranked Cincinnati. Late in the game against ninth-ranked Pittsburgh, Brown led a 42-yard drive to set up the game-winning field goal. In the regular season finale, Brown ran for a first down on a naked bootleg to clinch a 24–21 victory over Rutgers. West Virginia earned an invitation to the 2010 Gator Bowl, where it faced Florida State, but Brown was replaced by Smith after suffering an ankle injury in the first half.

== Professional career ==
Pre-draft measurables
Height	Weight	Arm length	Hand span	40-yard dash	10-yard split	20-yard split	20-yard shuttle	Three-cone drill	Vertical jump	Broad jump	Wonderlic
6 ft 3 in (1.91 m)	224 lb (102 kg)	34 7/8 in (0.89 m)	10 in (0.25 m)	4.54 s	1.57 s	2.64 s	4.39 s	7.24 s	34 1/2 in (0.88 m)	9 ft 6 in (2.90 m)	15
All values from NFL Combine

Brown played in the 2010 Senior Bowl, in which he was a reserve behind Florida quarterback Tim Tebow; the St. Louis Post-Dispatch considered him the most impressive quarterback of the game. As an NFL draft prospect, The Sporting News praised his "strong arm and quick release". At the NFL Scouting Combine, he ran the 40-yard dash in 4.54 seconds and recorded a 34.5-inch vertical jump and nine-foot, six-inch broad jump. NBC Sports considered him a viable scrambling quarterback in the league. He scored a 15 on the Wonderlic intelligence test. ESPN considered Brown as the best performing in a mediocre crop of quarterbacks during the combine.

After going undrafted in the 2010 NFL draft, the San Francisco 49ers signed Brown to a free agent contract. He was re-signed to the practice squad, but the franchise released him on September 8 when it signed quarterback Troy Smith and moved Nate Davis to the practice squad. Later in September, Brown tried out with the Pittsburgh Steelers alongside quarterbacks Levi Brown and John David Booty in search of a replacement for the injured Dennis Dixon. Brown also worked out with the New York Giants earlier in September and with the Houston Texans in October.

On January 10, 2011, Brown was signed by the Cleveland Browns. He competed for the third-string quarterback job in the preseason. Brown was released by the Browns on September 2, 2011, during final cuts. He was then signed to the Indianapolis Colts' practice squad on November 29. In May 2012, Brown attended the Carolina Panthers' rookie minicamp.

On October 3, 2012, Brown was signed to the practice roster of the BC Lions of the Canadian Football League (CFL). Brown re-signed with the Lions in 2013.

On December 16, 2013, Brown was assigned to the Spokane Shock of the Arena Football League. On May 20, 2014, Brown was placed on reassignment by the Shock. On May 28, 2014, Brown was once again assigned to the Shock. He was placed on recallable reassignment on March 14, 2015. Brown was once again assigned to the Shock on March 26, 2015. Brown made his first career start for the Shock during their Week 2 game against the Philadelphia Soul. Brown was able to lead the Shock to a few scoring plays, but his ineffective play ultimately led to his benching in favor of Matt Bassuener. On April 14, 2015, he was placed on reassignment by the Shock.

Brown played for the West Virginia Roughriders of the American Arena League (AAL) in 2019, leading the team to a 13–0 overall record and an AAL championship game victory. In the title game, Brown completed 14 of 24 passes for 157 yards, five touchdowns, and two pick-sixes while also rushing for 49 yards and two touchdowns as the Roughriders beat the Carolina Energy by a score of 55–29.

== Career statistics ==
=== AFL ===
Year	Team	Passing							Rushing		
Year	Team	Cmp	Att	Pct	Yds	TD	Int	Rtg	Att	Yds	TD
2014	Spokane	0	0	0.0	0	0	0	0.0	1	2	0
2015	Spokane	15	26	57.7	173	2	3	57.53	4	37	3
Career		15	26	57.7	173	2	3	57.53	5	39	3

=== College ===
Year	Team	Passing								Rushing			
Year	Team	Cmp	Att	Pct	Yds	Y/A	TD	Int	Rtg	Att	Yds	Avg	TD
2006	West Virginia	28	47	59.6	384	8.2	2	1	138.0	32	176	5.5	3
2007	West Virginia	31	48	64.6	341	7.1	2	2	129.7	49	327	6.7	3
2008	West Virginia	22	30	73.3	114	3.8	1	1	109.6	36	169	4.7	1
2009	West Virginia	187	296	63.2	2,144	7.2	11	9	130.2	117	466	4.0	6
Career		268	421	63.7	2,983	7.1	16	13	129.5	234	1,138	4.9	13
