= 2009–10 NCAA football bowl games =

College football postseason game series

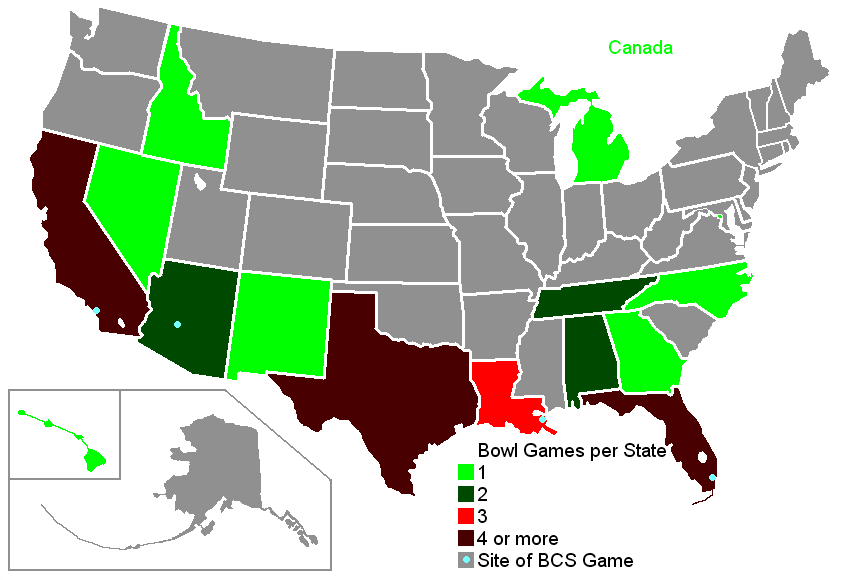
- Bowl sites by state
- Season: 2009
- Number of bowls: 34
- All-star games: 3
- Bowl games: December 19, 2009 – February 6, 2010
- National Championship: 2010 Citi BCS National Championship
- Location of Championship: Rose Bowl Stadium, Pasadena, California
- Champions: Alabama Crimson Tide
- Bowl Challenge Cup winner: Mountain West Conference
Bowl record by conference
| Conference | Bowls | Record | Number of teams in final AP poll |
| SEC | 10 | 6–4 (0.600) | 4 |
| Big 12 | 8 | 4–4 (0.500) | 3 |
| Big Ten | 7 | 4–3 (0.571) | 4 |
| ACC | 7 | 3–4 (0.429) | 4 |
| Pac-10 | 7 | 2–5 (0.286) | 2 |
| Big East | 6 | 4–2 (0.667) | 3 |
| Conference USA | 6 | 2–4 (0.333) | 0 |
| Mountain West | 5 | 4–1 (0.800) | 3 |
| MAC | 5 | 1–4 (0.200) | 1 |
| WAC | 4 | 2–2 (0.500) | 1 |
| Sun Belt | 2 | 1–1 (0.500) | 0 |
| Independents | 1 | 1–0 (1.000) | 0 |

The 2009–10 NCAA football bowl games concluded the 2009 NCAA Division I FBS football season. It comprised 34 team-competitive bowl games, and three all-star games. The games began play on December 19, 2009 and included the 2010 BCS National Championship Game in Pasadena, California, played on January 7 at the Rose Bowl Stadium. The post-season concluded with three all-star games: the East–West Shrine Game on January 23, the Senior Bowl on January 30, and the Texas vs. The Nation Game on February 6.

A total of 34 team-competitive games were played. While bowl games had been the purview of only the very best teams for nearly a century, this was the fourth consecutive year that teams with non-winning seasons participated in bowl games. To fill the 68 available bowl slots, a total of eight teams (12% of all participants) with non-winning seasons participated in bowl games—all eight had a .500 (6-6) season.

== Selection of the teams ==
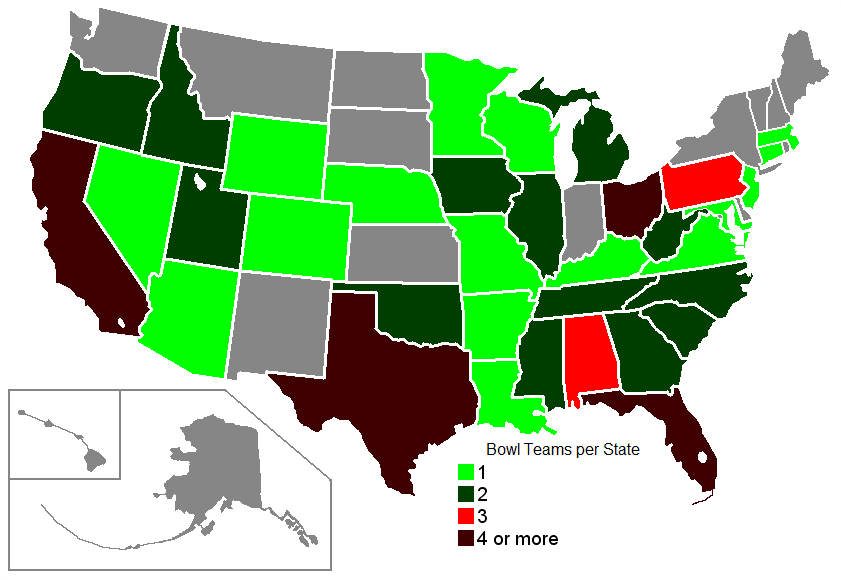
Number of bowl teams per state.

NCAA by-laws state that a school with a record of 6–6 in regular season play is eligible only if conferences cannot fill out available positions for bowl games with teams possessing seven (or more) wins (excluding games played in Hawaii and conference championship games in the ACC, Big 12, Conference USA, Mid-American Conference and the SEC). An example was in 2008 when the Big Ten, the Big 12 and SEC each had two teams selected for the Bowl Championship Series games – Ohio State and Penn State from the Big Ten, Texas and Oklahoma from the Big 12 and Alabama and Florida from the SEC. With each conference sending two teams to the BCS, these three conferences forfeited several bowl game slots due to a lack of teams with a winning record.

As with the 2006 and 2008 seasons, all eligible teams with at least 7 wins made it in to a bowl game. Of the 71 eligible teams, only 68 could play in a game, and all three eligible teams that sat out bowl season were 6-6: Louisiana-Lafayette, Louisiana-Monroe, and Notre Dame, who opted not to play in a bowl game themselves after the firing of head coach Charlie Weis.

For the first time in BCS history, every participant in a BCS bowl was ranked in the top 10 of the final BCS standings.

== Fox ends BCS contract ==
Fox Sports no longer broadcast the Bowl Championship Series following the conclusion of the Orange Bowl on January 5; the network had carried the first three BCS National Championship stand-alone games. ABC telecast this season's contest because of their separate agreement with the Pasadena Tournament of Roses, the organizers of the Rose Bowl Game and the hosts of the 2010 national championship. Beginning in 2011, ABC sibling company ESPN will begin carrying all of the BCS bowls, in an agreement that will last through 2014. Fox has signed a long-term contract extension with the AT&T Cotton Bowl Classic through 2014, with a new prime-time Friday night date starting in 2011.

== Sponsorship and stadium changes ==
Maaco became the new title sponsor of the Las Vegas Bowl replacing Pioneer Corporation, and the game was rebranded as the Maaco Bowl Las Vegas. In another change, the Motor City Bowl thanks to Little Caesars now carries the name of the Little Caesars Pizza Bowl. Advocare became the title sponsor of the Independence Bowl. In a stadium shift, the Cotton Bowl Classic moves from its self-named home for 73 years at the grounds of Fair Park to Jerry Jones's new Cowboys Stadium in Arlington. The St. Petersburg Bowl was initially to be played without a sponsor after being sponsored by MagicJack in 2008, but just a few weeks before the Bowl, Beef O'Brady's agreed to be the sponsor, so the game became the "St. Petersburg Bowl presented by Beef O'Brady's".

== New bowls in 2010–11 ==
The Cotton Bowl in Fair Park will be the site of a new bowl game, the TicketCity Bowl, on New Years Day 2011, with the Big Ten and Conference USA providing opponents, and Yankee Stadium will host a game dubbed the Pinstripe Bowl in December 2010, pitting teams from the Big East and Big 12. This contest would be the first bowl game in the Metropolitan New York area since the now defunct Garden State Bowl, and the first in New York City since the now defunct Gotham Bowl was played in the original Yankee Stadium, while a third bowl, called the Cure Bowl benefiting Susan G. Komen for the Cure would pit members of the Sun Belt Conference and C-USA at Bright House Networks Stadium on the campus of the University of Central Florida in Orlando, Florida. The NCAA Football Issues Committee must approve of these games in the spring of 2010 to make them official.

== Coaching changes ==
As a result of head coaching changes between the regular season and the bowl season, the following teams played their postseason contests with interim head coaches:

| Team | Bowl | Season coach | Interim head coach | Result | 2010 head coach |
|---|---|---|---|---|---|
| Central Michigan | GMAC | Butch Jones | Steve Stripling | Won 44-41 over Troy | Dan Enos |
| Cincinnati | Sugar | Brian Kelly | Jeff Quinn | Lost 51–24 to Florida | Butch Jones |
| Marshall | Little Caesars Pizza | Mark Snyder | Rick Minter | Won 21–17 over Ohio | Doc Holliday |
| Texas Tech | Alamo | Mike Leach | Ruffin McNeill | Won 41–31 over Michigan State | Tommy Tuberville |

In addition, the following coach retired, but worked his team's bowl game:

| Team | Bowl | Season coach | Result | 2010 head coach |
|---|---|---|---|---|
| Florida State | Gator | Bobby Bowden | Won 33–21 over West Virginia | Jimbo Fisher |

=== Notes ===
- Kelly left Cincinnati to take the same job at Notre Dame.
- Jones left Central Michigan to fill the Cincinnati vacancy.
- Leach was suspended by Texas Tech on December 28 when redshirt sophomore wide receiver Adam James, son of ESPN analyst Craig James, and his family filed a complaint alleging mistreatment by Leach after the younger James had suffered a concussion. Two days later, Leach was fired.
- On December 26, Florida head coach Urban Meyer announced his resignation due to health concerns, effective after the Gators' Sugar Bowl appearance. However, Meyer had a change of heart and announced the following day that he would instead take an indefinite leave of absence, and expected to be back coaching by the start of the 2010 season. Offensive coordinator Steve Addazio took over Meyer's duties during his leave. Meyer returned to his job in time to lead the Gators' 2010 spring practice.

== Bowl schedule ==
All dates and game times for the 34 2009–10 season bowl games were announced on April 30, 2009, and are subject to change. They received licenses from the NCAA Football Issues Committee.
NOTE: Rankings from final BCS Standings of December 6, 2009.

Non-BCS Contests
| Date | Bowl | Location | Teams | Affiliations | Results |
|---|---|---|---|---|---|
| 12/19 | New Mexico Bowl | University Stadium; University of New Mexico; Albuquerque, New Mexico | Wyoming (6–6); Fresno State (8–4) | MWC; WAC | Wyoming 35; Fresno State 28 |
| 12/19 | St. Petersburg Bowl | Tropicana Field; St. Petersburg, Florida | Rutgers (8–4); UCF (8–4) | Big East; C-USA | Rutgers 45; UCF 24 |
| 12/20 | New Orleans Bowl | Louisiana Superdome; New Orleans | Middle Tennessee (9–3) (Note: Troy finished their regular season with a perfect 8–0 conference record, earning the Sun Belt title and the conference's lone automatic bowl bid; however, the New Orleans Bowl opted for Middle Tennessee, a Sun Belt team guaranteed an at-large, because Troy and Southern Miss had played each other in the 2008 New Orleans Bowl.); Southern Miss (7–5) | Sun Belt; C-USA | Middle Tennessee 42; Southern Miss 32 |
| 12/22 | Maaco Bowl Las Vegas | Sam Boyd Stadium; University of Nevada, Las Vegas; Whitney, Nevada | #14 BYU (10–2) #18 Oregon State (8–4) | MWC; Pac-10 | BYU 44; Oregon State 20 |
| 12/23 | Poinsettia Bowl | Qualcomm Stadium; San Diego | #23 Utah (9–3); California (8–4) | MWC; Pac-10 | Utah 37; California 27 |
| 12/24 | Hawaii Bowl | Aloha Stadium; Honolulu, HI | SMU (7–5); Nevada (8–4) (Note: Hawaii played a 13-game schedule this season, and lost to Wisconsin on December 5 to finish the season at 6–7, rendering them ineligible for a bowl game. As a result, the berth passed to another WAC team, Nevada.) | C-USA; WAC | SMU 45; Nevada 10 |
| 12/26 | Little Caesars Pizza Bowl | Ford Field; Detroit | Marshall (6–6) (Note: Because the Big Ten received two bids into the BCS, the spot normally filled by the #7 Big Ten team was instead be filled by the at-large Thundering Herd.); Ohio (9–4) | C-USA; MAC | Marshall 21; Ohio 17 |
| 12/26 | Meineke Car Care Bowl | Bank of America Stadium; Charlotte, North Carolina | #17 Pittsburgh (9–3); North Carolina (8–4) | Big East; ACC | Pittsburgh 19; North Carolina 17 |
| 12/26 | Emerald Bowl | AT&T Park; San Francisco | #24 USC (8–4); Boston College (8–4) | Pac-10; ACC | USC 24; Boston College 13 |
| 12/27 | Music City Bowl | LP Field; Nashville, Tennessee | Clemson (8–5); Kentucky (7–5) | ACC; SEC | Clemson 21; Kentucky 13 |
| 12/28 | Independence Bowl | Independence Stadium; Shreveport, Louisiana | Georgia (7–5); Texas A&M (6–6) | SEC; Big 12 | Georgia 44; Texas A&M 20 |
| 12/29 | EagleBank Bowl | RFK Stadium; Washington, D.C. | UCLA (6–6) (Note: Army, had to defeat Navy in its final game to be bowl-eligible, but lost 17–3 December 12. Conference USA has a contingency contract for this slot if Army fails to beat Navy; however, all bowl-eligible C-USA teams were already in bowls.); Temple (9–3) (Note: The ACC had only seven bowl-eligible teams this season. The MAC has a contingency slot with this bowl if the ACC does not produce eight bowl-eligible teams, and all five of its bowl-eligible teams have at least 7 wins, so Temple received this berth.) | Pac-10; MAC | UCLA 30; Temple 21 |
| 12/29 | Champs Sports Bowl | Citrus Bowl; Orlando, Florida | #25 Wisconsin (9–3) #15 Miami (FL) (9–3) | Big Ten; ACC | Wisconsin 20; Miami (FL) 14 |
| 12/30 | Humanitarian Bowl | Bronco Stadium; Boise State University; Boise, Idaho | Idaho (7–5); Bowling Green (7–5) (Note: The MWC did not qualify enough teams to fill all of its bowl bids as a result of TCU receiving a BCS bid.) | WAC; MAC | Idaho 43; Bowling Green 42 |
| 12/30 | Holiday Bowl | Qualcomm Stadium; San Diego | #22 Nebraska (9–4) #20 Arizona (8–4) | Big 12; Pac-10 | Nebraska 33; Arizona 0 |
| 12/31 | Armed Forces Bowl | Amon G. Carter Stadium; Texas Christian University; Fort Worth, Texas | Air Force (7–5); Houston (10–3) | MWC; C-USA | Air Force 47; Houston 20 |
| 12/31 | Sun Bowl | Sun Bowl Stadium; University of Texas at El Paso; El Paso, Texas | Oklahoma (7–5) #21 Stanford (8–4) | Big 12; Pac-10 | Oklahoma 31; Stanford 27 |
| 12/31 | Texas Bowl | Reliant Stadium; Houston | Navy (9–4) (Note: Navy won seven games to be bowl-eligible, as they are playing a 13-game schedule. They secured the bid on November 7 with a 23–21 win over Notre Dame.); Missouri (8–4) | Independent; Big 12 | Navy 35; Missouri 13 |
| 12/31 | Insight Bowl | Sun Devil Stadium; Arizona State University; Tempe, Arizona | Iowa State (6–6); Minnesota (6–6) | Big 12; Big Ten | Iowa State 14; Minnesota 13 |
| 12/31 | Chick-fil-A Bowl | Georgia Dome; Atlanta | #11 Virginia Tech (9–3); Tennessee (7–5) | ACC; SEC | Virginia Tech 37; Tennessee 14 |
| 1/1 | Outback Bowl | Raymond James Stadium; Tampa, Florida | Auburn (7–5); Northwestern (8–4) | SEC; Big Ten | Auburn 38; Northwestern 35 (OT) |
| 1/1 | Gator Bowl | Jacksonville Municipal Stadium; Jacksonville, Florida | Florida State (6–6) #16 West Virginia (9–3) | ACC; Big East | Florida State 33; West Virginia 21 |
| 1/1 | Capital One Bowl | Citrus Bowl; Orlando, Florida | #13 Penn State (10–2) #12 LSU (9–3) | Big Ten; SEC | Penn State 19; LSU 17 |
| 1/2 | International Bowl | Rogers Centre; Toronto, Ontario, Canada | South Florida (7–5); NIU (7–5) | Big East; MAC | South Florida 27; NIU 3 |
| 1/2 | PapaJohns.com Bowl | Legion Field; Birmingham, Alabama | UConn (7–5); South Carolina (7–5) | Big East; SEC | UConn 20; South Carolina 7 |
| 1/2 | Cotton Bowl Classic | Cowboys Stadium; Arlington, Texas | Ole Miss (8–4) #19 Oklahoma State (9–3) | SEC; Big 12 | Ole Miss 21; Oklahoma State 7 |
| 1/2 | Liberty Bowl | Liberty Bowl Memorial Stadium; Memphis, Tennessee | Arkansas (7–5); East Carolina (9–4) | SEC; C-USA | Arkansas 20; East Carolina 17 (OT) |
| 1/2 | Alamo Bowl | Alamodome; San Antonio | Texas Tech (8–4); Michigan State (6–6) | Big 12; Big Ten | Texas Tech 41; Michigan State 31 |
| 1/6 | GMAC Bowl | Ladd–Peebles Stadium; Mobile, Alabama | Central Michigan (11–2); Troy (9–3) (Note: This slot became an at-large slot after the ACC produced only seven bowl-eligible teams.) | MAC; Sun Belt | Central Michigan 44; Troy 41 (2 OT) |
Bowl Championship Series 2010 Schedule
| Date | Bowl | Location | Teams | Affiliations | Results |
| 1/1 | Rose Bowl | Rose Bowl; Pasadena, California | #8 Ohio State (10–2) #7 Oregon (10–2) | Big Ten; Pac-10 | Ohio State 26; Oregon 17 |
| 1/1 | Sugar Bowl | Louisiana Superdome; New Orleans | #5 Florida (12–1) #3 Cincinnati (12–0) | SEC; Big East | Florida 51; Cincinnati 24 |
| 1/4 | Fiesta Bowl | University of Phoenix Stadium; Glendale, Arizona | #6 Boise State (13–0) #4 TCU (12–0) | WAC; MWC | Boise State 17; TCU 10 |
| 1/5 | Orange Bowl | Land Shark Stadium; Miami Gardens, Florida | #10 Iowa (10–2) #9 Georgia Tech (11–2) | Big Ten; ACC | Iowa 24; Georgia Tech 14 |
| 1/7 | BCS National Championship Game | Rose Bowl; Pasadena, California | #1 Alabama (13–0) #2 Texas (13–0) | SEC; Big 12 | Alabama 37; Texas 21 |

== Post-BCS all-star games ==
| Date | All-Star Game | Location | Score | Ref. |
|---|---|---|---|---|
| January 23 | East–West Shrine Game | Citrus Bowl; Orlando, Florida | East 13, West 10 | |
| January 31 | Under Armour Senior Bowl | Ladd-Peebles Stadium, Mobile, Alabama | North 31, South 13 | |
| February 6 | Texas vs The Nation | Sun Bowl Stadium; University of Texas at El Paso; El Paso, Texas | Texas 36, The Nation 17 | |

=== Bowl Challenge Cup standings ===
| Conference | Wins | Losses | Pct. |
|---|---|---|---|
| Independents • | 1 | 0 | 1.000 |
| Mountain West † | 4 | 1 | .800 |
| Big East | 4 | 2 | .667 |
| SEC | 6 | 4 | .600 |
| Big Ten | 4 | 3 | .571 |
| Big 12 | 4 | 4 | .500 |
| WAC | 2 | 2 | .500 |
| Sun Belt • | 1 | 1 | .500 |
| ACC | 3 | 4 | .429 |
| Conference USA | 2 | 4 | .333 |
| Pac-10 | 2 | 5 | .286 |
| MAC | 1 | 4 | .200 |

• – Does not meet minimum game requirement of three teams needed for a conference to be eligible.
† – Bowl Challenge Cup winner.
