= 2009 Big East Conference football season =

- League: NCAA Division I FBS (Football Bowl Subdivision)
- Sport: football
- Duration: September 3, 2009 through January 2, 2010
- Teams: 8
- TV partner: ESPN-Big East Network

Regular season
- Champion: Cincinnati

Football seasons
- 2008 2010

2009 Big East Conference football standings
	Conf.			Overall
Team	W		L	W		L
No. 8 Cincinnati $	7	–	0	12	–	1
No. 25 West Virginia	5	–	2	9	–	4
No. 15 Pittsburgh	5	–	2	10	–	3
Rutgers	3	–	4	9	–	4
Connecticut	3	–	4	8	–	5
South Florida	3	–	4	8	–	5
Louisville	1	–	6	4	–	8
Syracuse	1	–	6	4	–	8
$ – BCS representative as conference champion; Rankings from AP Poll

The 2009 Big East football season was an NCAA football season that was played from September 5, 2009, to January 2, 2010. The Big East Conference consists of 8 football members: Cincinnati, Connecticut, Louisville, Pittsburgh, Rutgers, South Florida, Syracuse, and West Virginia. Cincinnati won the Big East Championship for the second consecutive year and was invited to the Allstate Sugar Bowl where they lost to Florida 51–24. Overall, the Big East went 4–2 in Bowl Games.

== Previous season ==
Cincinnati (11–3) was the Big East champions and got the conference's automatic bid into the BCS and went to the FedEx Orange Bowl, losing to ACC champion Virginia Tech 20–7.

Five other Big East teams went to bowl games in 2008, finishing bowl play with a record of 4–2 as a conference. Connecticut (8–5) beat Buffalo 38–20 in the International Bowl. Pittsburgh (9–4) lost to Oregon State 3–0 in the Brut Sun Bowl. Rutgers (8–5) beat North Carolina State 29–23 in the PapaJohns.com Bowl. South Florida (8–5) beat Memphis 41–14 in the magicJack St. Petersburg Bowl. And West Virginia (9–4) beat North Carolina 31–30 in the Meineke Car Care Bowl. The only two teams not to go to a bowl game were Louisville (5–7) and Syracuse (3–9).

== Preseason ==
=== Preseason poll ===
The 2009 Big East preseason poll was announced at the Big East Media Day in Newport, RI on August 4. Pittsburgh was chosen as the favorite to win the conference.

==== Big East Media Poll ====
1. Pittsburgh – 161 (8)
2. West Virginia – 151 (5)
3. Cincinnati – 144 (8)
4. South Florida – 130 (3)
5. Rutgers – 126
6. Connecticut – 74
7. Louisville – 51
8. Syracuse – 27

=== Award watch lists ===
Award	School	Player
Bronko Nagurski Trophy	South Florida	Jerome Murphy
Bronko Nagurski Trophy	South Florida	George Selvie
Bronko Nagurski Trophy	Syracuse	Arthur Jones
Dave Rimington Trophy	Rutgers	Ryan Blaszczyk
Dave Rimington Trophy	Syracuse	Jim McKenzie
Lombardi Award	Pittsburgh	Nate Byham
Lombardi Award	Rutgers	Anthony Davis
Lombardi Award	South Florida	George Selvie
Lombardi Award	Syracuse	Arthur Jones
Lombardi Award	West Virginia	Scooter Berry
Lombardi Award	West Virginia	Chris Neild
Lombardi Award	West Virginia	J.T. Thomas
Lombardi Award	West Virginia	Reed Williams
Manning Award	Cincinnati	Tony Pike
Manning Award	South Florida	Matt Grothe
Maxwell Award	Cincinnati	Mardy Gilyard
Maxwell Award	Cincinnati	Tony Pike
Maxwell Award	South Florida	Matt Grothe
Maxwell Award	West Virginia	Noel Devine
Lou Groza Award	Cincinnati	Jake Rogers
Lou Groza Award	UConn	Dave Teggart
Outland Trophy	Rutgers	Anthony Davis
Outland Trophy	Syracuse	Arthur Jones
Fred Biletnikoff Award	Cincinnati	Mardy Gilyard
Fred Biletnikoff Award	Louisville	Doug Beaumont
Walter Camp Award	Cincinnati	Mardy Gilyard
Walter Camp Award	South Florida	George Selvie
Jim Thorpe Award	Pittsburgh	Aaron Berry
Bednarik Award	Uconn	Scott Lutrus
Bednarik Award	Pittsburgh	Greg Romeus
Bednarik Award	Rutgers	Ryan D'Imperio
Bednarik Award	South Florida	George Selvie
Bednarik Award	Syracuse	Arthur Jones
Bednarik Award	West Virginia	Reed Williams
Doak Walker Award	UConn	Andre Dixon
Doak Walker Award	Uconn	Jordan Todman
Doak Walker Award	West Virginia	Noel Devine
Davey O'Brien Award	West Virginia	Jarrett Brown
Davey O'Brien Award	South Florida	Matt Grothe
Davey O'Brien Award	Cincinnati	Tony Pike

== Regular season ==
Index to colors and formatting
Big East member won
Big East member lost
Big East teams in **bold**

All times Eastern time.

Rankings reflect that of the USA Today Coaches poll for that week until week eight when the BCS rankings will be used.

=== Week One ===
Date	Time	Visiting team	Home team	Site	TV	Result	Attendance
September 5	12:00 p.m.	Minnesota	**Syracuse**	Carrier Dome • Syracuse, NY	ESPN2	**L** 23–20 in OT	48,617
September 5	12:00 p.m.	Liberty	**West Virginia**	Mountaineer Field • Morgantown, WV		**W** 33–20	57,950
September 5	1:00 p.m.	Youngstown State	**Pittsburgh**	Heinz Field • Pittsburgh, PA		**W** 38–3	48,497
September 5	7:00 p.m.	**UConn**	Ohio	Peden Stadium • Athens, OH		**W** 23–16	24,617
September 5	7:00 p.m.	Wofford	**South Florida**	Raymond James Stadium • Tampa, FL		**W** 40–7	40,360
September 5	7:30 p.m.	Indiana State	**Louisville**	Papa John's Cardinal Stadium • Louisville, KY		**W** 30–10	39,344
September 7	1:00 p.m.	**Cincinnati**	**Rutgers**	Rutgers Stadium • Piscataway, NJ	ESPN	**CIN** 47–15	53,737

Players of the week:

Offensive		Defensive		Special teams	
Player	Team	Player	Team	Player	Team
Tony Pike	Cincinnati	Lindsey Witten	UConn	Tyler Bitancurt	West Virginia

=== Week Two ===
Date	Time	Visiting team	Home team	Site	TV	Result	Attendance
September 12	12:00 p.m.	#19 North Carolina	**UConn**	Rentschler Field • East Hartford, CT	ESPNU	**L** 12–10	38,087
September 12	12:00 p.m.	**Pittsburgh**	Buffalo	University at Buffalo Stadium • Amherst, NY	ESPN2	**W** 54–27	21,870
September 12	12:00 p.m.	**Syracuse**	#5 Penn State	Beaver Stadium • University Park, PA	Big Ten Network	**L** 28–7	106,387
September 12	3:30 p.m.	Howard	**Rutgers**	Rutgers Stadium • Piscataway, NJ		**W** 45–7	43,722
September 12	3:30 p.m.	East Carolina	**West Virginia**	Mountaineer Field • Morgantown, WV		**W** 35–20	59,216
September 12	7:30 p.m.	Southeast Missouri State	#23 **Cincinnati**	Nippert Stadium • Cincinnati, OH	FSN-Ohio	**W** 70–3	30,421
September 12	7:30 p.m.	**South Florida**	Western Kentucky	Houchens Industries–L. T. Smith Stadium • Bowling Green, KY		**W** 35–13	20,568

Players of the week:

Offensive		Defensive		Special teams	
Player	Team	Player	Team	Player	Team
Jarrett Brown	West Virginia	Adam Gunn	Pittsburgh	Mardy Gilyard	Cincinnati

=== Week Three ===
Date	Time	Visiting team	Home team	Site	TV	Result	Attendance
September 19	12:00 p.m.	**Louisville**	Kentucky	Commonwealth Stadium • Lexington, KY	ESPNU	**L** 31–27	70,988
September 19	5:00 p.m.	**UConn**	Baylor	Floyd Casey Stadium • Waco, TX		**W** 30–22	40,147
September 19	5:00 p.m.	Florida International	**Rutgers**	Rutgers Stadium • Piscataway, NJ		**W** 23–15	45,273
September 19	6:00 p.m.	Navy	**Pittsburgh**	Heinz Field • Pittsburgh, PA		**W** 27–14	55,064
September 19	6:45 p.m.	#21 **Cincinnati**	#24 Oregon State	Reser Stadium • Corvallis, OR	FSN	**W** 28–18	41,909
September 19	7:00 p.m.	Charleston Southern	**South Florida**	Raymond James Stadium • Tampa, FL		**W** 59–0	38,798
September 19	7:00 p.m.	Northwestern	**Syracuse**	Carrier Dome • Syracuse, NY		**W** 37–34	40,251
September 19	7:45 p.m.	**West Virginia**	Auburn	Jordan–Hare Stadium • Auburn, AL	ESPN2	**L** 41–30	87,451

Players of the week:

Offensive		Defensive		Special teams	
Player	Team	Player	Team	Player	Team
Mike Williams	Syracuse	Dan Mason	Pittsburgh	Ryan Lichtenstein	Syracuse

=== Week Four ===
Date	Time	Visiting team	Home team	Site	TV	Result	Attendance
September 26	12:00 p.m.	Fresno State	#15 **Cincinnati**	Nippert Stadium • Cincinnati, OH		**W** 28–20	32,910
September 26	12:00 p.m.	Rhode Island	**UConn**	Rentschler Field • East Hartford, CT		**W** 52–10	38,620
September 26	12:00 p.m.	**South Florida**	#25 Florida State	Doak Campbell Stadium • Tallahassee, FL	ESPNU	**W** 17–7	83,542
September 26	3:30 p.m.	**Rutgers**	Maryland	Byrd Stadium • College Park, MD		**W** 34–13	43,848
September 26	3:30 p.m.	**Pittsburgh**	North Carolina State	Carter–Finley Stadium • Raleigh, NC	ESPNU	**L** 38–31	57,583
September 26	7:00 p.m.	Maine	**Syracuse**	Carrier Dome • Syracuse, NY		**W** 41–24	35,632
September 26	7:30 p.m.	**Louisville**	Utah	Rice-Eccles Stadium • Salt Lake City, UT	CBS College Sports	**L** 30–14	45,588

Players of the week:

Offensive		Defensive		Special teams	
Player	Team	Player	Team	Player	Team
Mardy Gilyard	Cincinnati	Jason Pierre-Paul	South Florida	Teddy Dellaganna	Rutgers

=== Week Five ===
Date	Time	Visiting team	Home team	Site	TV	Result	Attendance
October 1	7:30 p.m.	Colorado	**West Virginia**	Mountaineer Field • Morgantown, WV	ESPN	**W** 35–24	60,055
October 2	8:00 p.m.	**Pittsburgh**	**Louisville**	Papa John's Cardinal Stadium • Louisville, KY	ESPN2	**PITT** 35–10	39,948
October 3	12:00 p.m.	#23 **South Florida**	**Syracuse**	Carrier Dome • Syracuse, NY	Big East Network	**USF** 34–20	40,147
October 3	1:00 p.m.	#11 **Cincinnati**	Miami (OH)	Yager Stadium • Oxford, OH		**W** 37–13	23,493

Players of the week:

Offensive		Defensive		Special teams	
Player	Team	Player	Team	Player	Team
Bill Stull	Pittsburgh	Nate Allen	South Florida	Scott Kozlowski	West Virginia

=== Week Six ===
Date	Time	Visiting team	Home team	Site	TV	Result	Attendance
October 10	12:00 p.m.	**West Virginia**	**Syracuse**	Carrier Dome • Syracuse, NY	Big East Network	**WVU** 34–13	40,144
October 10	3:30 p.m.	**UConn**	**Pittsburgh**	Heinz Field • Pittsburgh, PA	ABC	**PITT** 24–21	44,839
October 10	3:30 p.m.	Texas Southern	**Rutgers**	Rutgers Stadium • Piscataway, NJ		**W** 42–0	50,169
October 10	7:30 p.m.	Southern Mississippi	**Louisville**	Papa John's Cardinal Stadium • Louisville, KY	ESPNU	**W** 25–23	37,268

Players of the week:

Offensive		Defensive		Special teams	
Player	Team	Player	Team	Player	Team
Noel Devine	West Virginia	Robert Vaughn	UConn	Dan Hutchins	Pittsburgh

=== Week Seven ===
Date	Time	Visiting team	Home team	Site	TV	Result	Attendance
October 15	7:30 p.m.	#9 **Cincinnati**	#21 **South Florida**	Raymond James Stadium • Tampa, FL	ESPN	**CIN** 34–17	63,976
October 16	8:00 p.m.	**Pittsburgh**	**Rutgers**	Rutgers Stadium • Piscataway, NJ	ESPN	**PITT** 24–17	50,296
October 17	12:00 p.m.	**Louisville**	**UConn**	Rentschler Field • East Hartford, CT	Big East Network	**UCONN** 38–25	40,000
October 17	3:30 p.m.	Marshall	**West Virginia**	Mountaineer Field • Morgantown, WV	Big East Network	**W** 24–7	54,432

On October 18, UConn cornerback Jasper Howard was stabbed to death during a fight at an on campus dance. Howard had a career-high 11 tackles and forced a 3rd-quarter fumble to earn the game ball just hours before his death.

Players of the week:

Offensive		Defensive		Special teams	
Player	Team	Player	Team	Player	Team
Dion Lewis	Pittsburgh	Lawrence Wilson	UConn	Jacob Rogers	Cincinnati

=== Week Eight ===
Date	Time	Visiting team	Home team	Site	TV	Result	Attendance
October 23	8:00 p.m.	**Rutgers**	Army	Michie Stadium • West Point, NY	ESPN2	**W** 27–10	24,098
October 24	12:00 p.m.	**UConn**	#23 **West Virginia**	Mountaineer Field • Morgantown, WV	ESPNU	**WVU** 28–24	58,106
October 24	12:00 p.m.	**South Florida**	#20 **Pittsburgh**	Heinz Field • Pittsburgh, PA	Big East Network	**PITT** 41–14	50,019
October 24	3:30 p.m.	**Louisville**	#5 **Cincinnati**	Nippert Stadium • Cincinnati, OH	ESPNU	**CIN** 41–10	35,099
October 24	3:30 p.m.	Akron	**Syracuse**	Carrier Dome • Syracuse, NY		**W** 28–14	36,991

Players of the week:

Offensive		Defensive		Special teams	
Player	Team	Player	Team	Player	Team
Noel Devine	West Virginia	Dom DeCicco	Pittsburgh	Tavon Austin	West Virginia

=== Week Nine ===
Date	Time	Visiting team	Home team	Site	TV	Result	Attendance
October 30	8:00 p.m.	#21 **West Virginia**	**South Florida**	Raymond James Stadium • Tampa, FL	ESPN2	**USF** 30–19	56,328
October 31	12:00 p.m.	#8 **Cincinnati**	**Syracuse**	Carrier Dome • Syracuse, NY	ESPNU	**CIN** 28–7	33,802
October 31	12:00 p.m.	**Rutgers**	**UConn**	Rentschler Field • East Hartford, CT	Big East Network	**RUTG** 28–24	37,045
October 31	3:30 p.m.	Arkansas State	**Louisville**	Papa John's Cardinal Stadium • Louisville, KY		**W** 21–13	21,497

Players of the week:

Offensive		Defensive		Special teams	
Player	Team	Player	Team	Player	Team
Tim Brown	Rutgers	Kion Wilson	South Florida	Devin McCourty	Rutgers

=== Week Ten ===
Date	Time	Visiting team	Home team	Site	TV	Result	Attendance
November 7	12:00 p.m.	**Louisville**	**West Virginia**	Mountaineer Field • Morgantown, WV	Big East Network	**WVU** 17–9	55,334
November 7	12:00 p.m.	**Syracuse**	#13 **Pittsburgh**	Heinz Field • Pittsburgh, PA	ESPNU	**PITT** 37–10	46,855
November 7	8:00 p.m.	**UConn**	#5 **Cincinnati**	Nippert Stadium • Cincinnati, OH	ABC	**CIN** 47–45	35,100

Players of the week:

Offensive		Defensive		Special teams	
Player	Team	Player	Team	Player	Team
Zach Collaros	Cincinnati	Julian Miller	West Virginia	Jacob Rogers	Cincinnati

=== Week Eleven ===
Date	Time	Visiting team	Home team	Site	TV	Result	Attendance
November 12	7:30 p.m.	#24 **South Florida**	**Rutgers**	Rutgers Stadium • Piscataway, NJ	ESPN	**RUTG** 31–0	48,057
November 13	8:00 p.m.	#25 **West Virginia**	#5 **Cincinnati**	Nippert Stadium • Cincinnati, OH	ESPN2	**CIN** 24–21	35,105
November 14	12:00 p.m.	**Syracuse**	**Louisville**	Papa John's Cardinal Stadium • Louisville, KY	Big East Network	**LOU** 10–9	33,223
November 14	8:00 p.m.	Notre Dame	#12 **Pittsburgh**	Heinz Field • Pittsburgh, PA	ABC	**W** 27–22	65,374

Players of the week:

Offensive		Defensive		Special teams	
Player	Team	Player	Team	Player	Team
Jonathan Baldwin	Pittsburgh	Chris Campa	Louisville	Devin McCourty	Rutgers

=== Week Twelve ===
Date	Time	Visiting team	Home team	Site	TV	Result	Attendance
November 21	12:00 p.m.	**Louisville**	**South Florida**	Raymond James Stadium • Tampa, FL	Big East Network	**USF** 34–22	49,388
November 21	2:30 p.m.	**UConn**	Notre Dame	Notre Dame Stadium • Notre Dame, IN	NBC	**W** 33–30 in 2OT	80,795
November 21	3:00 p.m.	**Rutgers**	**Syracuse**	Carrier Dome • Syracuse, NY		**SYR** 31–13	36,759

Players of the week:

Offensive		Defensive		Special teams	
Player	Team	Player	Team	Player	Team
B.J. Daniels	South Florida	Doug Hogue	Syracuse	Jordan Todman	UConn

=== Week Thirteen ===
Date	Time	Visiting team	Home team	Site	TV	Result	Attendance
November 27	11:00 a.m.	**Rutgers**	**Louisville**	Papa John's Cardinal Stadium • Louisville, KY	ESPN2	**RUTG** 34–14	23,422
November 27	12:00 p.m.	Illinois	#5 **Cincinnati**	Nippert Stadium • Cincinnati, OH	ABC	**W** 49–36	35,106
November 27	7:00 p.m.	#9 **Pittsburgh**	**West Virginia**	Mountaineer Field • Morgantown, WV	ESPN2	**WVU** 19–16	56,123
November 28	12:00 p.m.	**Syracuse**	**UConn**	Rentschler Field • East Hartford, CT	Big East Network	**UCONN** 56–31	40,000
November 28	3:30 p.m.	#17 Miami	**South Florida**	Raymond James Stadium • Tampa, FL	ABC	**L** 31–10	66,469

Players of the week:

Offensive		Defensive		Special teams	
Player	Team	Player	Team	Player	Team
Tony Pike	Cincinnati	Robert Sands	West Virginia	Tyler Bitancurt	West Virginia

=== Week Fourteen ===
Date	Time	Visiting team	Home team	Site	TV	Result	Attendance
December 5	12:00 p.m.	#5 **Cincinnati**	#15 **Pittsburgh**	Heinz Field • Pittsburgh, PA	ABC	**CIN** 45–44	63,387
December 5	12:00 p.m.	#23 **West Virginia**	**Rutgers**	Rutgers Stadium • Piscataway, NJ	ESPN	**WVU** 24–21	52,534
December 5	8:00 p.m.	**South Florida**	**UConn**	Rentschler Field • East Hartford, CT	ESPN2	**UCONN** 29–27	35,624

Players of the week:

Offensive		Defensive		Special teams	
Player	Team	Player	Team	Player	Team
Tony Pike	Cincinnati	Reed Williams	West Virginia	Mardy Gilyard	Cincinnati

== Rankings ==
Legend
	Improvement in ranking
	Drop in ranking
	Not ranked previous week
RV	Received votes but were not ranked in Top 25 of poll

Ranking Movement
		Pre	Wk 1	Wk 2	Wk 3	Wk 4	Wk 5	Wk 6	Wk 7	Wk 8	Wk 9	Wk 10	Wk 11	Wk 12	Wk 13	Wk 14	Final
Cincinnati	AP	RV	23	17	14	10	8	8	5	5	4	5	5	5	5	4	8
Cincinnati	C	RV	23	21	15	11	10	9	6	7	7	5	5	5	5	4	9
Cincinnati	BCS	Not released							5	8	5	5	5	5	5	3	
Connecticut	AP																RV
Connecticut	C																RV
Connecticut	BCS	Not released															
Louisville	AP																
Louisville	C																
Louisville	BCS	Not released															
Pittsburgh	AP	RV	RV	RV	RV		RV	RV	20	16	14	8	8	8	15	17	15
Pittsburgh	C	RV	RV	RV	RV		RV	RV	19	17	14	9	9	9	14	16	15
Pittsburgh	BCS	Not released							20	15	13	12	9	9	15	17	
Rutgers	AP	RV								RV	RV	RV	25		RV		
Rutgers	C	RV									RV	RV	RV	RV	RV		
Rutgers	BCS	Not released															
South Florida	AP	RV	RV	RV	RV	RV	23	21	RV		RV	23					
South Florida	C	RV	RV	RV	RV	RV	24	21	RV		RV	24		RV			
South Florida	BCS	Not released									25	24					
Syracuse	AP																
Syracuse	C																
Syracuse	BCS	Not released															
West Virginia	AP	RV	RV	RV			RV	RV	22	20	RV	RV	RV	RV	24	18	25
West Virginia	C	RV	RV	RV			RV	RV	22	20	RV	23	RV	RV	23	17	22
West Virginia	BCS	Not released							23	21		25			23	16	

== Records against other conferences ==
As of games through week 13

Conference	Wins	Losses
ACC	2	3
Big 12	2	0
Big Ten	2	2
CUSA	3	0
Independents	4	0
MAC	4	0
Mountain West	0	1
Pac-10	1	0
SEC	0	2
Sun Belt	3	0
WAC	1	0
All FCS	10	0
Overall	32	8

== Bowl games ==
Bowl Game	Date	Stadium	City	Television	Matchups/Results	Attendance	Payout (US$)
St. Petersburg Bowl	December 19, 2009	Tropicana Field	St. Petersburg, FL	ESPN	Rutgers 45, UCF 24	29,763	$1,000,000
Meineke Car Care Bowl	December 26, 2009	Bank of America Stadium	Charlotte, NC	ESPN	Pittsburgh 19, North Carolina 17	50,389	$1,000,000
Konica Minolta Gator Bowl	January 1, 2010	Jacksonville Municipal Stadium	Jacksonville, FL	CBS	Florida State 33, West Virginia 21	84,129	$2,500,000
Sugar Bowl	January 1, 2010	Louisiana Superdome	New Orleans, Louisiana	FOX	Florida 51, Cincinnati 24	65,207	$18,000,000
International Bowl	January 2, 2010	Rogers Centre	Toronto, ON	ESPN2	South Florida 27, Northern Illinois 3	22,185	$750,000
PapaJohns.com Bowl	January 2, 2010	Legion Field	Birmingham, AL	ESPN	UConn 20, South Carolina 7	45,254	$900,000

== Attendance ==
Team	Stadium (Capacity)	Game 1	Game 2	Game 3	Game 4	Game 5	Game 6	Game 7	Game 8	Total	Average	% of Capacity
Cincinnati	Nippert Stadium (35,098)	30,421	32,910	35,099	35,100	35,105	35,106			203,651	33,942	96.7
Connecticut	Rentschler Field (40,000)	38,087	38,620	40,000	37,045	40,000	35,624			229,376	38,229	95.6
Louisville	Papa John's Cardinal Stadium (42,000)	39,344	39,948	37,268	21,497	33,223	23,422			194702	32,450	77.3
Pittsburgh	Heinz Field (65,050)	48,497	55,064	44,839	50,019	46,855	65,374	63,387		374,035	53,434	82.1
Rutgers	Rutgers Stadium (52,454)	53,737	43,722	45,273	50,169	50,296	48,057	52,534		343,788	49,113	93.6
South Florida	Raymond James Stadium (65,857)	40,360	38,798	63,976	56,328	49,388	66,469			315,319	52,553	79.8
Syracuse	Carrier Dome (49,250)	48,617	40,251	35,632	40,147	40,144	36,991	33,802	36,759	312,343	39,043	79.3
West Virginia	Mountaineer Field (60,000)	57,950	59,216	60,055	54,432	58,106	55,334	56,123		401,216	57,316	95.5

== Awards and honors ==
=== Big East Conference Awards ===
The following individuals received postseason honors as voted by the Big East Conference football coaches.

2009 Big East Football Individual Awards
Award	Recipient(s)
Offensive Player of the Year	Dion Lewis, RB, PITTSBURGH
Defensive Player of the Year	Greg Romeus, DE, PITTSBURGH; Mick Williams, DL, PITTSBURGH
Special Teams Player of the Year	Mardy Gilyard, KR, CINCINNATI
Rookie of the Year	Dion Lewis, RB, PITTSBURGH
Coach of the Year	Brian Kelly, CINCINNATI
