= 2009 NCAA football bowl games =

In college football, 2009 NCAA football bowl games may refer to:

- 2008-09 NCAA football bowl games, for games played in January 2009 as part of the 2008 season
- 2009-10 NCAA football bowl games, for games played in December 2009 as part of the 2009 season
