= 2010 NCAA football bowl games =

In college football, 2010 NCAA football bowl games may refer to:

- 2009–10 NCAA football bowl games, for games played in January 2010 as part of the 2009 season.
- 2010–11 NCAA football bowl games, for games played in December 2010 as part of the 2010 season.
