= Jasper Howard =

American football player (1989–2009)

No. 6
- Position: Cornerback
- Class: Junior

Personal information
- Born: January 28, 1989; Miami, Florida, U.S.
- Died: October 18, 2009 (aged 20); Mansfield, Connecticut, U.S.
- Listed height: 5 ft 10 in (1.78 m)
- Listed weight: 180 lb (82 kg)

Career information
- High school: Miami Edison High School
- College: Connecticut (2007–2009)

Awards and highlights
- 2007 Big East Conference co-Champion

Jasper Tyrone "Jazz" Howard (January 28, 1989 – October 18, 2009) was an American football cornerback for the University of Connecticut Huskies from 2007 to 2009. He was fatally stabbed on October 18, 2009, hours after UConn's win over the Louisville Cardinals.

== Early life ==
Howard grew up in the Little Haiti neighborhood of Miami, an area known for its poverty and violence. His mother JoAngila Howard worked numerous jobs to support Howard and his two younger sisters. His youngest sister had health issues after a severe case of meningitis. His plan was to get a football scholarship and go to the NFL to get money and get his family out of the violent streets of Miami. At Miami Edison High School, Howard was an All-Dade County pick as a senior, and named MVP of the annual Nike Dade-Broward All-Star Game after returning a punt 70 yards for a touchdown and making a 45-yard touchdown catch. He was also the team captain.

== University of Connecticut ==
Howard became the first person in his family to go to college when he enrolled at the University of Connecticut. In his freshman season he played in seven games as a reserve defensive back and on special teams but had no starts. Howard played as a freshman and started as a sophomore, leading the Big East in punt returns. He continued as a starter in his junior year, playing the first six regular season games. His last game with the Huskies was their homecoming game on October 17, 2009; Howard achieved a career-high 11 tackles (7 solo, 4 assisted) in addition to making a fumble recovery, in the Huskies win over the Louisville Cardinals.

== Death ==
On the night of October 17–18, Howard and some of his teammates were at an on-campus dance to celebrate the 38–25 homecoming win over Louisville. Just after midnight, he was stabbed to death outside the Student Union Center where the dance was held. On Monday, October 19, 2009, police arrested Johnny Hood, 21, of Hartford, Connecticut. Police said that Hood had been charged with interfering with an officer and with breaching the peace, but that he had not been charged in the stabbing death of Howard.

Arrests were subsequently made in connection with Howard's murder. John William Lomax III, 21, who was not a student at UConn, was scheduled to appear in court on Wednesday, October 28, 2009, on charges of murder and conspiracy to commit assault in the death of Jasper Howard and his bond was set at $2 million. Police also arrested two other people in connection with the fight that led to Howard's death. Hakim Muhammad, 20, was charged with conspiracy to commit assault and Jamal Todd, 21, faced a felony charge of falsely reporting an incident and a misdemeanor charge of reckless endangerment for pulling a fire alarm that emptied the dance early that Sunday morning.

On January 14, 2011, Lomax – who had gone to his vehicle with Muhammad to retrieve weapons after an initial incident, then sought out Howard and his friends for the deadly follow-up – pleaded no contest to first degree manslaughter and on March 25, 2011, he was sentenced to 18 years in prison.

== Memorials ==
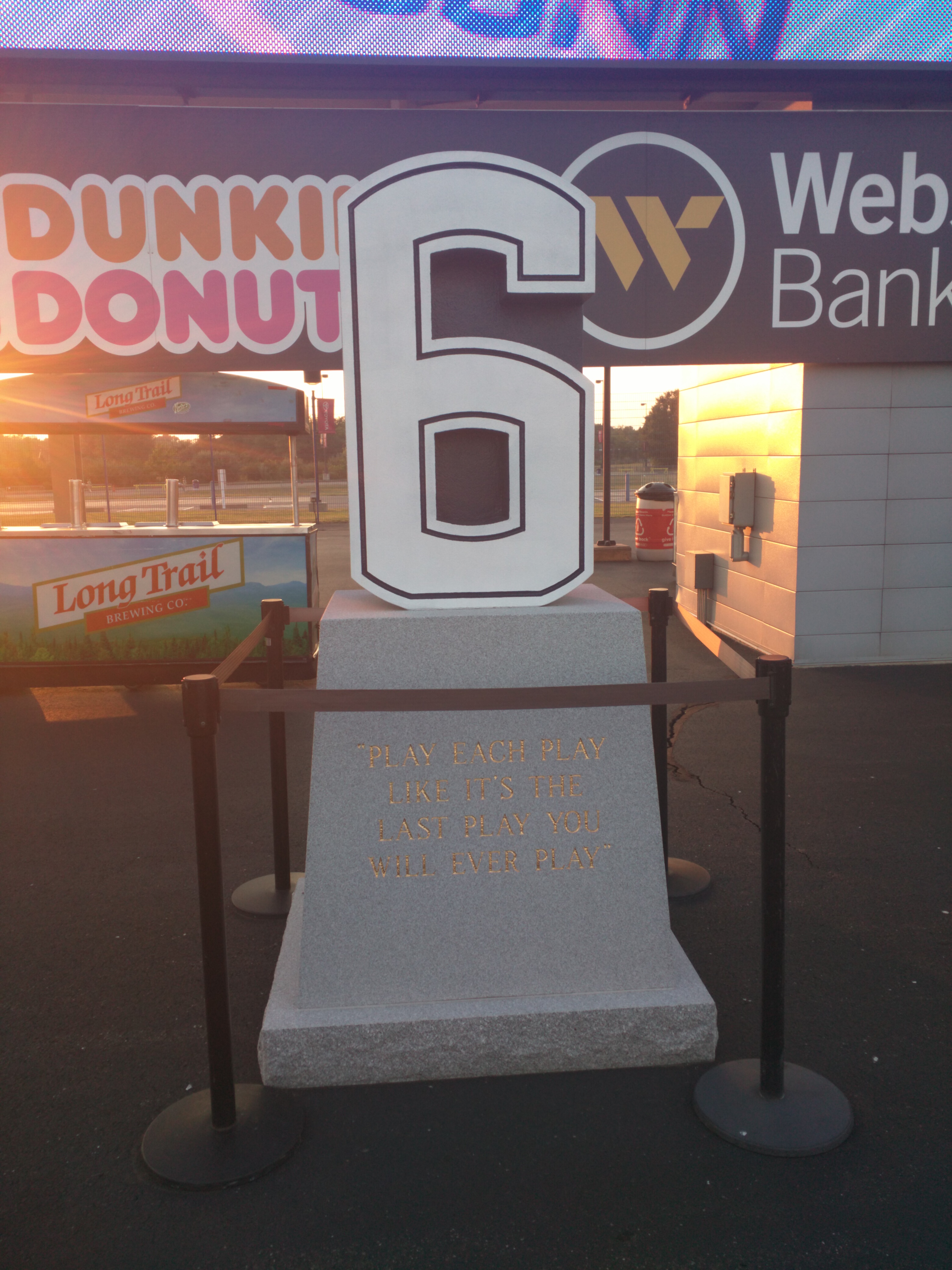
Jasper Howard monument displaying his jersey number 6. The memorial is at Rentschler Field

On Tuesday, October 20, Connecticut students held a Day of Silence in memory of Jasper, during which the community wore dark clothes to indicate that they are united in mourning. The next day there was a candlelight vigil held on campus. The UConn Huskies football team chose to pay tribute to Howard by wearing decals bearing his initials on their helmets which they brought to the sidelines through the end of the 2010 season when Howard would have graduated. A mural in the lobby of the Burton Family Football Complex that features former linebacker Alfred Fincher was replaced with a photo of Howard and a plaque commemorating his life and accomplishments along with the quote said by Jasper after the October 18 win over Louisville, "Play each play like it's the last play you'll ever play." Additionally, Edsall established a foundation that will help urban kids pay for college and also aid families of terminally ill players, something that Howard believed was important. Within days of Howard's death, former Miami Edison Senior High School teammate Chris Chancellor, then playing cornerback for the Clemson Tigers, paid tribute to Howard by changing his number from 38 to 6. During the Fiesta Bowl on January 1, 2011 against the Oklahoma Sooners, teammate Kashif Moore wore Jasper's number six jersey in tribute. Tribute songs were made by Little Haiti rapper Hollywoodyo, entitled "For The Dead".

On November 1, 2014, during that year's Homecoming, UConn unveiled a monument dedicated to Howard at Rentschler Field in front of the scoreboard on the concourse level. The monument was funded in part by a donation from Howard's former coach Randy Edsall, then head coach at the University of Maryland, who made an appearance at the ceremony via a recorded message played on the video board. More than 30 former teammates of Howard were present at the ceremony – including his best friends on the team, Andre Dixon and Kashif Moore – as well as greater than 30 members of Howard's extended family including his fiancée Daneisha Freeman and daughter Ja’Miya. Freeman later wrote a book titled Miya’s Guardian Angel about what she described as an “angel concept”.

== See also ==
- List of gridiron football players who died during their careers
