= 2009 Syracuse Orange football team =

American college football season

2009 Syracuse Orange football
- Conference: Big East Conference
- Record: 4–8 (1–6 Big East)
- Head coach: Doug Marrone (1st season)
- Offensive coordinator: Rob Spence (1st season)
- Offensive scheme: Multiple pro-style
- Defensive coordinator: Scott Shafer (1st season)
- Base defense: 4–3
- Home stadium: Carrier Dome

2009 Big East Conference football standings
	Conf.			Overall
Team	W		L	W		L
No. 8 Cincinnati $	7	–	0	12	–	1
No. 25 West Virginia	5	–	2	9	–	4
No. 15 Pittsburgh	5	–	2	10	–	3
Rutgers	3	–	4	9	–	4
Connecticut	3	–	4	8	–	5
South Florida	3	–	4	8	–	5
Louisville	1	–	6	4	–	8
Syracuse	1	–	6	4	–	8
$ – BCS representative as conference champion; Rankings from AP Poll

The 2009 Syracuse Orange football team represented Syracuse University during the 2009 NCAA Division I FBS football season. The Orange were coached by Doug Marrone and played their home games at the Carrier Dome in Syracuse, New York. The Orange finished the season 4–8 and 1–6 in Big East play.

== Schedule ==
Date	Time	Opponent	Site	TV	Result	Attendance	Source
September 5	12:00 pm	Minnesota*	Carrier Dome; Syracuse, NY	ESPN2	L 20–23 ^{OT}	48,617	
September 12	12:00 pm	at No. 5 Penn State*	Beaver Stadium; State College, PA (rivalry)	BTN	L 7–28	106,387	
September 19	7:00 pm	Northwestern*	Carrier Dome; Syracuse, NY	TWCSN	W 37–34	40,251	
September 26	7:00 pm	Maine*	Carrier Dome; Syracuse, NY	TWCSN	W 41–24	35,632	
October 3	12:00 pm	South Florida	Carrier Dome; Syracuse, NY	Big East Network	L 20–34	40,147	
October 10	12:00 pm	West Virginia	Carrier Dome; Syracuse, NY (rivalry)	Big East Network	L 13–34	40,144	
October 24	3:30 pm	Akron*	Carrier Dome; Syracuse, NY	TWCSN	W 28–14	36,991	
October 31	12:00 pm	No. 7 Cincinnati	Carrier Dome; Syracuse, NY	ESPNU	L 7–28	33,802	
November 7	12:00 pm	at No. 14 Pittsburgh	Heinz Field; Pittsburgh, PA (rivalry)	ESPNU	L 10–37	46,885	
November 14	12:00 pm	at Louisville	Papa John's Cardinal Stadium; Louisville, KY	Big East Network	L 9–10	33,223	
November 21	3:30 pm	No. 25 Rutgers	Carrier Dome; Syracuse, NY	ESPN360	W 31–13	36,759	
November 28	12:00 pm	at Connecticut	Rentschler Field; East Hartford, CT (rivalry)	Big East Network	L 31–56	40,000	
*Non-conference game; Rankings from Coaches' Poll released prior to the game

== Roster ==
2009 Syracuse Orange football team roster
Players
Coaches
Offense

Pos.	#	Name	Class
WR	1	Mike Williams	Sr
QB	2	Greg Paulus	Sr
RB	3	Delone Carter	Sr
QB	12	Ryan Nassib	Fr
G	66	Andrew Tiller	Jr
G	68	Justin Pugh	Fr

Defense

Pos.	#	Name	Class
LB	32	Doug Hogue	Jr
DT	97	Arthur Jones	Sr
DE	99	Chandler Jones	So

Special teams

Pos.	#	Name	Class
LS	57	Maximilian Leo	Sr

Head coach

- Doug Marrone (Syracuse)

Coordinators/assistant coaches

- John Anselmo (SUNY Cortland)
  1st year – (Secondary)

Legend

- (C) Team captain
- (S) Suspended
- (I) Ineligible
- Injured
- Redshirt

Roster
