= 2009 Connecticut Huskies football team =

American college football season

2009 Connecticut Huskies football
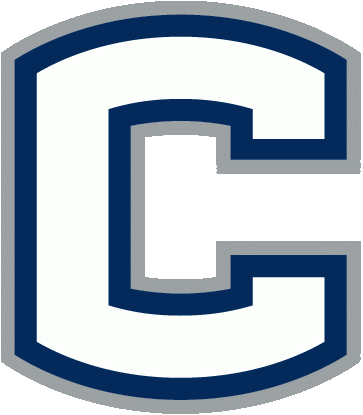

PapaJohns.com Bowl champion

PapaJohns.com Bowl, W 20–7 vs. South Carolina
- Conference: Big East Conference
- Record: 8–5 (3–4 Big East)
- Head coach: Randy Edsall (11th season)
- Offensive coordinator: Joe Moorhead (1st season)
- Offensive scheme: Spread
- Defensive coordinator: Todd Orlando (5th season)
- Base defense: 3–4
- Home stadium: Rentschler Field

2009 Big East Conference football standings
	Conf.			Overall
Team	W		L	W		L
No. 8 Cincinnati $	7	–	0	12	–	1
No. 25 West Virginia	5	–	2	9	–	4
No. 15 Pittsburgh	5	–	2	10	–	3
Rutgers	3	–	4	9	–	4
Connecticut	3	–	4	8	–	5
South Florida	3	–	4	8	–	5
Louisville	1	–	6	4	–	8
Syracuse	1	–	6	4	–	8
$ – BCS representative as conference champion; Rankings from AP Poll

The 2009 Connecticut Huskies football team represented the University of Connecticut as a member of the Big East Conference during the 2009 NCAA Division I FBS football season. Led by 11th-year head coach Randy Edsall, the Huskies compiled an overall record of 8–5 with a mark of 3–4 in conference play, placing in a three-way tie for fourth in the Big East. Connecticut was invited to the PapaJohns.com Bowl, where the Huskies defeated South Carolina. The team played home games at Rentschler Field in East Hartford, Connecticut.

== Schedule ==
Date	Time	Opponent	Site	TV	Result	Attendance
September 5	7:00 p.m.	at Ohio*	Peden Stadium; Athens, OH	ESPN360	W 23–16	24,617
September 12	12:00 p.m.	No. 19 North Carolina*	Rentschler Field; East Hartford, CT	ESPNU	L 10–12	38,087
September 19	5:00 p.m.	at Baylor*	Floyd Casey Stadium; Waco, TX		W 30–22	40,147
September 26	12:00 p.m.	Rhode Island*	Rentschler Field; East Hartford, CT (rivalry)	ESPN360	W 52–10	38,620
October 10	3:30 p.m.	at Pittsburgh	Heinz Field; Pittsburgh, PA	ABC, ESPN	L 21–24	44,893
October 17	12:00 p.m.	Louisville^{†}	Rentschler Field; East Hartford, CT	Big East Network	W 38–25	40,000
October 24	12:00 p.m.	at West Virginia	Milan Puskar Stadium; Morgantown, WV	ESPNU	L 24–28	58,106
October 31	12:00 p.m.	Rutgers	Rentschler Field; East Hartford, CT	Big East Network	L 24–28	37,045
November 7	8:00 p.m.	at No. 4 Cincinnati	Nippert Stadium; Cincinnati, OH	ABC	L 45–47	35,100
November 21	2:30 p.m.	at Notre Dame*	Notre Dame Stadium; Notre Dame, IN	NBC	W 33–30 ^{2OT}	80,795
November 28	12:00 p.m.	Syracuse	Rentschler Field; East Hartford, CT (rivalry)	Big East Network	W 56–31	40,000
December 5	8:00 p.m.	South Florida	Rentschler Field; East Hartford, CT	ESPN2	W 29–27	35,624
January 2	2:00 p.m.	vs. South Carolina*	Legion Field; Birmingham, AL (PapaJohns.com Bowl)	ESPN	W 20–7	45,254
*Non-conference game; ^{†}Homecoming; Rankings from AP Poll released prior to the game; All times are in Eastern time

== Preseason ==
=== Coaching changes ===
Connecticut lost its offensive coordinator of the previous three years when Rob Ambrose left the school to become the head coach at Towson. He will be replaced by Joe Moorhead, who was hired from Akron, where he held the same position.

=== Key losses ===
Four players on the 2008 UConn football team were selected in the 2009 NFL draft on April 25, 2009. Donald Brown was selected in the first round at No. 27 by the Indianapolis Colts. There Huskies were taken in the second round: Darius Butler at No. 41 by the New England Patriots, Will Beatty at No. 60 by the New York Giants, and Cody Brown at No. 63 by the Arizona Cardinals. After the draft, four other Huskies signed free agent contracts with NFL teams: Julius Williams (Jacksonville Jaguars), Dahna Deleston (Chicago Bears), Tyler Lorenzen (Jacksonville Jaguars), and Keith Gray (Carolina Panthers).

On May 2, 2009, Martin Bédard was taken in the second round of the 2009 CFL draft by the Montreal Alouettes.

=== Recruiting ===
On February 4, 2009, Randy Edsall announced that 21 student-athletes had signed a National Letter of Intent to attend Connecticut. Three— Keensen Chambers, Jesse Joseph and Trevardo Williams—entered Connecticut in January to participate in spring practice.

College recruiting information (2009)
Name	Hometown	School	Height	Weight	40^{‡}	Commit date
Marcus Aiken; WR	Bristol, CT	St. Paul Catholic HS	6 ft 1 in (1.85 m)	175 lb (79 kg)	4.52	Apr 2, 2008
Marcus Aiken; WR	Recruit ratings: Scout: Rivals:					
Michael Box; QB	Suwanee, GA	Collins Hill HS	6 ft 3 in (1.91 m)	190 lb (86 kg)	4.7	Aug 2, 2008
Michael Box; QB	Recruit ratings: Scout: Rivals:					
Tevrin Brandon; DB	Bethlehem, PA	Bethlehem Catholic HS	5 ft 10 in (1.78 m)	168 lb (76 kg)	4.43	Jul 2, 2008
Tevrin Brandon; DB	Recruit ratings: Scout: Rivals:					
Tyler Bullock; DE	Mechanicsburg, PA	Mechanicsburg Area HS	6 ft 4 in (1.93 m)	255 lb (116 kg)	n/a	Jun 28, 2008
Tyler Bullock; DE	Recruit ratings: Scout: Rivals:					
Keensen Chambers; DE	Worcester, MA	Worcester Academy	6 ft 6 in (1.98 m)	232 lb (105 kg)	n/a	Dec 14, 2008
Keensen Chambers; DE	Recruit ratings: Scout: Rivals:					
Chad Christen; K	Lewisberry, PA	Red Land SHS	6 ft 1 in (1.85 m)	190 lb (86 kg)	4.7	Dec 6, 2008
Chad Christen; K	Recruit ratings: Scout: Rivals:					
Dwayne Difton; WR	Fort Lauderdale, FL	St. Thomas Aquinas HS	6 ft 0 in (1.83 m)	176 lb (80 kg)	4.59	Jan 23, 2009
Dwayne Difton; WR	Recruit ratings: Scout: Rivals:					
Kevin Friend; OL	Warrenton, VA	Farquier HS	6 ft 4 in (1.93 m)	250 lb (110 kg)	5.2	Jan 18, 2009
Kevin Friend; OL	Recruit ratings: Scout: Rivals:					
Malik Generett; WR	York, PA	William Penn SHS	6 ft 5 in (1.96 m)	205 lb (93 kg)	4.5	May 30, 2008
Malik Generett; WR	Recruit ratings: Scout: Rivals:					
Steve Green; OL	Ebensburg, PA	Bishop Carroll HS	6 ft 4 in (1.93 m)	289 lb (131 kg)	5.38	Oct 28, 2008
Steve Green; OL	Recruit ratings: Scout: Rivals:					
Martin Hyppolite; RB	Wakefield, MA	Wakefield Memorial HS	6 ft 1 in (1.85 m)	215 lb (98 kg)	4.55	Jan 18, 2009
Martin Hyppolite; RB	Recruit ratings: Scout: Rivals:					
Jesse Joseph; DE	Saint Laurent, PQ	Vanier College	6 ft 4 in (1.93 m)	230 lb (100 kg)	n/a	Oct 25, 2008
Jesse Joseph; DE	Recruit ratings: Scout: Rivals:					
David Kenney; DB	Hightstown, NJ	The Peddie School	6 ft 1 in (1.85 m)	209 lb (95 kg)	4.40	Jul 23, 2008
David Kenney; DB	Recruit ratings: Scout: Rivals:					
Leon Kinnard; ATH	Baltimore, MD	Loyola HS	5 ft 9 in (1.75 m)	182 lb (83 kg)	4.43	Mar 27, 2008
Leon Kinnard; ATH	Recruit ratings: Scout: Rivals:					
Mike Lang; WR	Largo, FL	Largo HS	6 ft 0 in (1.83 m)	180 lb (82 kg)	4.4	Jan 29, 2009
Mike Lang; WR	Recruit ratings: Scout: Rivals:					
Chris Lopes; DB	Tilton, NH	Tilton School	5 ft 10 in (1.78 m)	181 lb (82 kg)	4.44	Jun 28, 2008
Chris Lopes; DB	Recruit ratings: Scout: Rivals:					
Mike Osiecki; LB	Seymour, CT	Seymour HS	6 ft 2 in (1.88 m)	225 lb (102 kg)	4.7	Mar 1, 2008
Mike Osiecki; LB	Recruit ratings: Scout: Rivals:					
Shamar Stephen; DT	Brookville, NY	Long Island Lutheran	6 ft 4 in (1.93 m)	260 lb (120 kg)	n/a	Jul 16, 2008
Shamar Stephen; DT	Recruit ratings: Scout: Rivals:					
Nick Williams; ATH	Princeton, NJ	The Hun School	5 ft 10 in (1.78 m)	179 lb (81 kg)	4.48	Jan 18, 2008
Nick Williams; ATH	Recruit ratings: Scout: Rivals:					
Trevardo Williams; DE	New Milford, CT	Canterbury School	6 ft 3 in (1.91 m)	210 lb (95 kg)	n/a	Aug 9, 2008
Trevardo Williams; DE	Recruit ratings: Scout: Rivals:					
Tim Willman; DE	Fulton, MD	Reservoir HS	6 ft 4 in (1.93 m)	255 lb (116 kg)	4.95	Dec 5, 2008
Tim Willman; DE	Recruit ratings: Scout: Rivals:					
Overall recruit ranking: Scout: 76 Rivals: 75
‡ Refers to 40-yard dash; Note: In many cases, Scout, Rivals, 247Sports, On3, and ESPN may conflict in their listings of height, weight and 40 time.; In these cases, the average was taken. ESPN grades are on a 100-point scale.; Sources: "Connecticut Commit List for 2009". Rivals.; "Connecticut: Commits". Scout.; "Scout.com Team Recruiting Rankings". Scout.; "2009 Team Ranking". Rivals.com.

=== Spring practice ===
Connecticut kicked off spring practice with the first of fifteen practices on March 17, 2009. Among the priorities set by the coaching staff are to have the team learn the newly installed up-tempo offensive game plan, determine how the running backs would replace Donald Brown, and take steps in determining who would replace Tyler Lorenzen as the starting quarterback.

The annual Blue-White Spring Game, which concludes spring practice, was held on April 18, 2009 at Rentschler Field in East Hartford, CT. The game featured a modified scoring system, which would pit the offense directly against the defense. The offense prevailed, 83–57.

=== Awards watchlists ===
The players listed below have been named to the following preseason award watch lists.

Doak Walker Award:

- Andre Dixon, Senior
- Jordan Todman, Sophomore

Ted Hendricks Award:

- Lindsey Witten, Senior

Lou Groza Award:

- David Teggart, Sophomore

Chuck Bednarik Award:

- Scott Lutrus, Junior

== Game summaries ==
=== Ohio ===
	1	2	3	4	Total
Huskies	7	7	2	7	23
Bobcats	0	7	0	9	16

The Huskies were led by 157 yards rushing from Jordan Todman, as they defeated the Ohio Bobcats 23–16 in front of a record crowd at Peden Stadium. They were able to overcome four turnovers and a missed field goal with a solid running game and stout defense.

UConn opened the scoring with a four-yard touchdown pass from Zach Frazer to fullback Anthony Davis in the first quarter. The score culminated a 91-yard drive which began following an Ohio turnover. The Bobcats found the scoreboard for the first time in the second quarter when quarterback Boo Jackson found Taylor Price for a 43-yard touchdown. The Huskies, however, answered with a 35-yard touchdown pass from Frazer to Brad Kanuch on the subsequent drive. Lindsey Witten sacked new Ohio quarterback, Theo Scott in the endzone for a safety to provide the only scoring in the third quarter. A four-yard touchdown run from Todman increased the Huskies lead to 23–7. The Bobcats attempted to make a fourth quarter comeback with a touchdown pass from Scott to Riley Dunlop, and a 50-yard field goal from Matt Weller. However, the comeback was thwarted when the Huskies recovered an onside kick with under three minutes in the game.

Andre Dixon joined Todman by also rushing for 100 yards. It was the first time that two Huskies rushed for 100 yards in the same game since November 11, 2006, in a double overtime win against Pittsburgh.

After the victory, game balls were awarded to Dixon (offense), Witten (defense) and Robbie Frey (special teams).

For his performance, Lindsey Witten was awarded the Big East Defensive Player of the Week. Jordan Todman was named to the weekly honor roll.

The game was the second and final in a two-game series between the two schools. The first game of the series was played on September 21, 2002 at Memorial Stadium in Storrs, Connecticut. Connecticut is 2–0 all time against Ohio.

=== North Carolina ===
	1	2	3	4	Total
#19 Tar Heels	0	0	0	12	12
Huskies	0	3	7	0	10

Aided by a late holding penalty which resulted in a safety, the North Carolina Tar Heels escaped their first visit to Rentschler Field with a narrow 12–10 victory. Both teams were powered by stout defenses and provided rough going for both offenses.

The Huskies reached the scoreboard first when David Teggart kicked a 47-yard field goal at the end of the first half. Following Twyon Martin's first career interception, the Huskies scored the game's first touchdown on a four-yard run by Jordan Todman. However, North Carolina quickly responded in the fourth quarter with a 22-yard field goal, and, after a Huskies punt, followed with a two-yard touchdown pass from T. J. Yates to Zack Pianalto, which tied the game at 10.

Facing a third and long from their own eight-yard line, the Huskies' Dan Ryan was called for a holding penalty in the end zone, resulting in a safety, and a two-point Tar Heel lead. UConn's Alex Molina recovered the ensuing on-side kick, but the Huskies were unable to score.

The Huskies' Lindsey Witten recorded four sacks, bringing his season total to seven through two games and placing him first in the FBS in that category. He was named to the Big East weekly honor roll for his performance.

Injuries played a large role in the game for the Huskies. They played without starting linebacker, Scott Lutrus, who was out with a shoulder injury. During the game, starting quarterback, Zach Frazer, and starting tight end, Ryan Griffin were both lost to injuries.

The game was the second and final in a two-game series between the two schools. The first game of the series was played on October 4, 2008 at Kenan Memorial Stadium in Chapel Hill, North Carolina. Connecticut is 0–3 all time against North Carolina.

=== Baylor ===
	1	2	3	4	Total
Huskies	3	10	14	3	30
Bears	7	0	7	8	22

The Huskies overcame multiple injuries to defeat the Baylor Bears 30–22. They were led by a strong rushing game, led by the tandem of Andre Dixon and Jordan Todman, and a stout defense. Dixon scored his first touchdown since 2007, and had his first multi touchdown game as he rushed for 149 yards and 3 touchdowns. The UConn defense was able to force three Bear turnovers, and held vaunted Baylor quarterback Robert Griffin in check for most of the game.

For the second time in three games in 2009, the Huskies had two rushers eclipse the 100-yard mark, as Todman gained 103 yards.

UConn played the game without starting quarterback Zach Frazer, tight end Ryan Griffin and linebacker, Scott Lutrus missed his second consecutive game with a shoulder injury.

After the victory, game balls were awarded to Dixon, Lawrence Wilson, Desi Cullen and Jasper Howard. Dixon was also named to the Big East's weekly honor roll.

The game was the second and final in a two-game series between the two schools. The first game of the series was played on September 19, 2008 at Rentschler Field in East Hartford, Connecticut. Connecticut is 2–0 all time against Baylor.

=== Rhode Island ===
	1	2	3	4	Total
Rams	7	0	0	3	10
Huskies	14	10	14	14	52

The Huskies overcame seven fumbles to beat Rhode Island 52–10 before a crowd of 38,620 at Rentschler Field. The game was the 1000th played in Connecticut football history, which dates back to 1896.

Three Huskies set career highs in the game – Redshirt sophomore quarterback Cody Endres (Washington, Pa.) set career-highs in completions and passing yards and threw the first two touchdowns of his career. Sophomore wide receiver Michael Smith (Houston, Texas), who set career standards with eight catches and 82 receiving yards. Sophomore running back Jordan Todman, who rushed for 70 yards on 15 carries and registered a career-best three rushing touchdowns.

For his performance, Lawrence Wilson was named to the Big East Weekly Honor Roll. The Huskies improved to 3–1 on the season, while the Rams dropped to 1–2 with the loss.

=== Pittsburgh ===
	1	2	3	4	Total
Huskies	0	7	14	0	21
Panthers	3	0	10	11	24

UConn took a 21–6 lead with 3:56 to go in the third quarter after Andre Dixon scored on a two-yard run that capped an eight-play, 61-yard drive. The Panthers then came right back to make it 21–13 as they had an eight-play 74-yard TD drive in the final moments of third quarter. Stull completed a 26-yard TD pass to Jonathan Baldwin for the score. Pittsburgh tied the game at 21–21 with 7:35 to go on a 27-yard TD pass by Stull to Dorin Dickerson. In the final seconds of the game, University of Pittsburgh kicker Dan Hutchins knocked in an 18-yard field goal to give the Panthers the 24–21 comeback lead and the victory in front of 44,893 at Heinz Field.

Despite the loss, and largely due to his two interceptions and one touchdown, Robert Vaughn was named the Big East Defensive Player of the Week. Connecticut dropped to 3–3 all time against Pittsburgh.

=== Louisville ===
	1	2	3	4	Total
Cardinals	0	13	0	12	25
Huskies	7	7	17	7	38

In the homecoming game the Huskies scored in every quarter to win the game 38–25. Senior running back Andre Dixon ran for 153 yards and three touchdowns and Connecticut beat Louisville for the Huskies first Big East win of the season. Another Husky who had a great game was junior cornerback Jasper Howard, who had 11 tackles and recovered a fumble.

It would prove to be Howard's last game. He was stabbed to death at an official function in UConn's Student Union just after 12:30 am the next morning.

With a season high 16 tackles, Lawrence Wilson was named Big East Defensive Player of the Week, the second consecutive recognition for a Husky. Andre Dixon was named to the weekly honor roll. Connecticut improved to 3–3 all-time against Louisville and 3–2 in Big East Conference contests against the Cardinals.

=== West Virginia ===
	1	2	3	4	Total
Huskies	7	10	0	7	24
Mountaineers	7	7	7	7	28

The game had an emotional start as there was a moment of silence for Connecticut junior cornerback Jasper Howard. Following the moment of silence both teams had a pregame handshake at midfield. The Huskies had a sticker of Jasper's initials put on each of their helmets to honor him. West Virginia got off to a quick 7–0 lead as Tavon Austin returned the opening kickoff 98 yards for a touchdown in the fastest score against the Huskies in the FBS era. UConn then scored the next 10 points of the game as Jordan Todman scored his seventh TD of the season on a five-yard run that wrapped up a nine-play, 67-yard drive with 5:46 left in the first quarter. UConn took a 17–14 lead into halftime. A 56-yard touchdown run by Noel Devine with 2:10 remaining in the game gave West Virginia a 28–24 lead and the victory over the University of Connecticut football team before a crowd of 58,106 at Mountaineer Field at Milan Puskar Stadium.

=== Rutgers ===
	1	2	3	4	Total
Scarlet Knights	7	14	0	7	28
Huskies	3	7	0	14	24

Just like in the previous game against West Virginia, UConn had the lead in the fourth quarter but with 22 seconds left in the game Tim Brown scored on an 81-yard pass from Tom Savage to give Rutgers a 28–24 victory. The loss drops the Huskies to 4–4 on the season, 1–3 in conference play. The Scarlet Knights improve to 6–2, 1–2 in league action.

Robbie Frey was named to the Big East Weekly Honor Roll after the game.

=== Cincinnati ===
	1	2	3	4	Total
Huskies	7	3	14	21	45
#4 Bearcats	10	20	7	10	47

Both teams used their backup quarterbacks due to injuries to the starting quarterbacks. Zach Frazer for the Huskies and Zach Collaros for the Bearcats. The two teams traded touchdowns on their opening possessions as the Bearcats drove down the field 80 yards on eight plays to score on a one-yard run by Isaiah Pead less than three minutes into the game. The Huskies came right back and moved the ball 79 yards in 11 plays as Todman had his first score of the night on a six-yard run to tie the game at 7–7. Cincinnati scored the next 10 points on a 41-yard field goal by Jacob Roberts with 4:57 to go in the first quarter and a four-yard TD run by Collaros to complete a 10-play, 87-yard drive 48 second into the second quarter. Cincy took a 30–10 score into the half. UConn scored two touchdowns coming out of the half to cut the Cincinnati lead down to eight. On a fourth and one with a little more than five minutes remaining in the game, Todman recorded his career best fourth touchdown run of the game to pull the Huskies within two points. Frazer dropped back to pass on the two-point conversion but was knocked down by Curtis Young as Cincy kept their lead heading into the final minutes of the fourth quarter. It looked like the Huskies had stopped Cincinnati on their final drive of the game when junior Lawrence Wilson (Tuscaloosa, Ala.) put pressure on the running game to force a fourth down. But the Bearcats went for it and Isaiah Pead broke free from the UConn defense to run in a 14-yard score putting Cincy back up by nine with just 1:52 remaining in the game. Easley brought the Huskies within three points with 13 seconds remaining in the game scoring his first touchdown of the night on a nine-yard pass from Frazer. Teggart tacked on the extra point to bring the Huskies within two. UConn's on side kick attempt was fielded by Charley Howard to seal the Cincinnati victory. UConn fell to 4–5 on the season and 1–4 in the BIG EAST while the fifth-ranked Bearcats improved to 9–0 and 5–0 in the BIG EAST.

With 162 rushing yards and four touchdowns, Jordan Todman was named to the Big East Weekly Honor Roll. The Huskies dropped to 1–5 against the Bearcats.

=== Notre Dame ===
	1	2	3	4	OT	2OT	Total
Huskies	0	10	7	3	7	6	33
Fighting Irish	7	7	3	3	7	3	30

Clausen got the Irish on the board first with an eight-yard touchdown pass to Tate with 10:59 to play in the opening quarter. The score would remain 7–0 until the 14:32 mark of the second quarter, when Clausen capped an 11-play, 80-yard scoring drive with a one-yard scoring plunge to put Notre Dame on top, 14–0. The Huskies cut the deficit to 14–7 on their next possession, when Todman broke free for a 43-yard touchdown run. UConn made it a 14–10 game late in the second quarter on a 39-yard field goal by Dave Teggart. The Irish pushed their lead back to seven after David Ruffer kicked a 20-yard field goal at the 9:29 mark of the third quarter. But Todman returned the ensuing kickoff 96 yards for a touchdown to make it a 17–17 game. After the teams traded field goals in the fourth quarter, the UConn defense recovered a fumble at the Notre Dame 41 with 49 seconds to play. Teggart had a chance to give UConn the victory at the end of regulation, but his 37-yard field goal sailed wide left as time expired. Each team scored a touchdown in the first overtime and at the end of the OT the teams were tied and went to a second OT. The Irish were not able to move the chains to open the second overtime, and they had to settle for a Ruffer field goal. Andre Dixon scored on a four-yard touchdown run in the second overtime, as the Connecticut Huskies finally pulled out a close game and beat Notre Dame, 33–30 at Notre Dame Stadium.

Jordan Todman was named the Big East Conference Special Teams Player of the Week. Andre Dixon and Lawrence Wilson were also named to the Weekly Honor Roll. Connecticut is 1–0 against Notre Dame.

After the victory, Randy Edsall sent the game ball to the family of Jasper Howard.

=== Syracuse ===
	1	2	3	4	Total
Orange	3	14	0	14	31
Huskies	14	14	7	21	56

The Huskies became bowl eligible for the third consecutive season with a 56–31 win over Big East foe Syracuse. The Huskies scored on their first possession after holding Syracuse to a three-and-out on the game's opening possession and Orange punter Rob Long's punt got caught up in the brisk wind that plagued the contest and went just 13 yards. Eight plays later, Dixon scored from the four to put the Huskies in front and give them a lead they would never relinquish. After a Syracuse field goal, Mike Lang returned the ensuing kickoff 80 yards for the Huskies' third kickoff return for a touchdown of the season. Syracuse then scored a touchdown to make the score 14–10. Later in the second quarter, Twyon Martin recovered a Delone Carter fumble setting up the Huskies at the Syracuse 43. One play later, sophomore running back Jordan Todman rambled in from the 37 to put the Huskies ahead, 21–10. The run gave Todman exactly 1,000 rushing yards this season and the score was Todman's 15th touchdown on the season. The Huskies took a 28–17 lead into the locker room. The Huskies continued their offensive domination in the second half when they marched 80 yards in 15 plays that saw Frazer hit Easley with an 8-yard touchdown pass. Paulus hit Lavar Lobdell with a 12-yard touchdown pass on the first play of the fourth quarter, but Connecticut answered right back when Dixon scurried in from the 45 to give the Huskies a 42–24 lead. Carter capped an 84-yard drive with a 10-yard scoring run, but late in the game, with Huskies facing a fourth-and-11 from the Syracuse 28, Frazer connected again with Easley on a touchdown pass to put the Huskies back safely ahead, 49–31. Syracuse wide receiver Antwon Bailey caught a pass from Paulus and tried to lateral to Lemon, but the ball was fumbled and Connecticut's Dwayne Gratz scooped up the errant ball and took it to the end zone with the recovery.

With 17 tackles, Lawrence Wilson was named to the Big East's Weekly Honor Roll. Connecticut improved to 4–2 against the Orange.

=== South Florida ===
	1	2	3	4	Total
Bulls	0	7	7	13	27
Huskies	6	7	7	9	29

South Florida came from warm and sunny Tampa, Florida to cold and snowy East Hartford, Connecticut, but that did not stop the Bulls as they marched down the snowy field and were up 27–26 with 40 seconds left to go in the game. After the Bulls failed to make the 2-point conversion the Huskies were still in the game. Quarterback Zach Frazer made completions to Ryan Griffin, Andre Dixon and Kashif Moore put the Huskies at the USF 26, and Dixon ran the ball to the middle of the field to set up kicker Dave Teggart's winning attempt. By then the snow slowed down and Teggart who missed a 46-yard field goal earlier in the game made a 42-yard field goal as time expired to give Connecticut a 29–27 football victory over South Florida before a crowd of 35,624 at Rentschler Field. The game was Senior Night for 16 Huskies who played their final game for Connecticut.

After the victory, game balls were awarded to Zach Frazer (offense), Scott Lutrus (defense) and Dave Teggart (special teams). The three were also named to the Big East's weekly honor roll. Connecticut is 3–4 all time against South Florida.

=== South Carolina ===
	1	2	3	4	Total
Gamecocks	0	0	0	7	7
Huskies	10	3	0	7	20

Andre Dixon rushed for 126 yards and one touchdown as the Huskies defeated the South Carolina Gamecocks in the fourth annual PapaJohns.com Bowl in Birmingham, Alabama. It was the Huskies third bowl victory in four attempts, and their first ever win over an opponent from the Southeastern Conference. The UConn defense came up strong by forcing two Gamecock turnovers, and holding the South Carolina offence to 205 yards.

Dixon, who was awarded the Fred Sington Most Valuable Player trophy, eclipsed 1000 rushing yards for the year during the game, joining Jordan Todman. The Huskies joined Georgia Tech and Nevada as the only Football Bowl Subdivision teams with two runners with at least 1000 rushing yards. It was also the first time that UConn accomplished the feat.

== October stabbing ==
On October 18, the morning after the Louisville game starting cornerback Jasper Howard was killed after being stabbed during a fight on the university's campus.

== Roster ==
2009 Connecticut Huskies roster
**Quarterbacks**: 4 Michael Box, (redshirt) Fr; 10 Zach Frazer, RS Jr; 12 Cody Endres, RS So; 16 Casey Turner, RS Fr; 18 Johnny Mcentee, RS Fr; **Tailbacks**: 2 Andre Dixon, RS Sr; 22 Kelmetrus Wylie, RS So; 23 Jordan Todman, So; 37 Joss Tillard, Jr; 39 Brett Manning, RS Jr; 44 Robbie Frey, RS So; 45 Martin Hyppolite, (redshirt) Fr; **Fullbacks**: 47 Anthony Davis, RS Jr; 49 **Anthony Sherman**, Jr; **Wide receivers**: 1 Dwayne Difton, Fr; 3 Brad Kanuch, Sr; 7 Mike Lang, Fr; 29 Marcus Easley, RS Sr; 29 Eric Sawicki, Fr; 31 Nick Williams, Fr; 80 Michael Smith, So; 82 Kashif Moore, RS So; 83 Isiah Moore, RS So; 85 Kevin Poles, RS Jr; 86 Cole Wagner, (redshirt) Fr; 86 Alex Molina, RS Jr; 87 Malik Gennerett, (redshirt) Fr; 88 Gerrard Sheppard, RS Fr; 89 Brandon Banks, Fr; **Tight ends**: 81 Corey Manning, RS Fr; 89 John Delahunt, RS Fr; 90 Alex Kaiser, Jr; 93 Derek Chard, Jr; 94 Ryan Griffin, RS Fr	**Offensive linemen**: 50 Tyler Bullock, (redshirt) Fr; 57 Muhammed Petrus, So; 60 Erik Kuraczea, RS Fr; 61 Stephen Brown, (redshirt) Fr; 62 Ben Chapman, RS Fr; 62 Glenn Kolbrenner; 63 Adam Masters, RS Fr; 65 Scott Schultz, RS So; 66 Matthieu Olivier, RS Jr; 67 Clark Maturo, RS Fr; 69 Steve Greene, (redshirt) Fr; 70 Gary Bardzak, RS So; 71 Mike Ryan, RS So; 72 Jimmy Bennett, RS Fr; 73 Dan Ryan, RS Sr; 74 Alex LaMagdelaine, RS Sr; 76 Zac Zielinski, RS Fr; 77 Kevin Friend, (redshirt) Fr; 78 Zach Hurd, RS Jr; 78 Mike Hicks, RS Sr; **Defensive linemen**: 4 Twyon Martin, RS So; 9 Lindsey Witten, Sr; 48 Trevardo Williams, Fr; 51 Tim Willman, (redshirt) Fr; 52 Brandon Dillon, RS Sr; 53 Ryan Wirth, RS Fr; 54 Alex Polito, RS Jr; 56 Mike Cox, RS Jr; 59 Shamar Stephen, (redshirt) Fr; 75 Beau Brunelli, RS Fr; 91 Jesse Joseph, Fr; 96 A.J. Portee, RS Fr; 98 Ted Jennings, RS Fr; 99 Kendall Reyes, RS So	**Linebackers**: 8 Lawrence Wilson, RS Jr; 10 Greg Robinson, RS Jr; 19 Kijuan Dabney, (injured) Jr; 26 Alex Folson, RS Jr; 28 Jory Johnson, RS Fr; 32 **Scott Lutrus**, RS Jr; 34 David Kenney, (redshirt) Fr; 37 Jonathan Jean-Louis, RS So; 39 Mark Hinkley, RS Fr; 41 James Healey, RS Fr; 46 Sio Moore, RS Fr; 55 Jerome Williams, RS Fr; 95 Greg Lloyd, Jr; **Defensive backs**: 5 Blidi Wreh-Wilson, RS Fr; 6 Jasper Howard, Jr; 15 Jerome Junior, RS Fr; 17 Joshua Massey, Jr; 17 Markeith Cirenna, Fr; 18 Marcus Aiken, (redshirt) Fr; 20 Tevrin Brandon, (redshirt) Fr; 21 Gary Wilburn, RS So; 24 Dwayne Gratz, RS Fr; 25 Harris Agbor, RS So; 27 Aaron Bagsby, RS So; 28 Emmanuel Omokaro, RS So; 30 Matt Edwards, RS Fr; 33 Robert Vaughn, Sr; 35 Chris Lopes, (redshirt) Fr; 40 John Yurek, RS So; 42 **Robert McClain**, Sr	**Kickers**: 13 Chad Christen **P**, (redshirt) Fr; 13 **Desi Cullen** **K/P**, Sr; 38 David Teggart **K**, RS So; Classes Key: Fr – Freshman; first year player. So – Sophomore; second year player. Jr – Junior; third year player. Sr – Senior; fourth year player. **Bold** – Team captain. RS – Previously used a redshirt. – Redshirt during 2009 season. – Injured for entire or majority of season and is eligible for a medical redshirt. Roster

== NFL draft ==
The following Huskies were selected in the 2010 NFL draft following the season.

Round	Pick	Player	Position	NFL club
4	107	Marcus Easley	Wide receiver	Buffalo Bills
7	249	Robert McClain	Defensive back	Carolina Panthers
