= 2009 West Virginia Mountaineers football team =

American college football season

2009 West Virginia Mountaineers football

Gator Bowl, L 21–33 vs. Florida State
- Conference: Big East Conference

Ranking
- Coaches: No. 22
- AP: No. 25
- Record: 9–4 (5–2 Big East)
- Head coach: Bill Stewart (2nd season)
- Offensive coordinator: Jeff Mullen (2nd season)
- Offensive scheme: Spread
- Defensive coordinator: Jeff Casteel (8th season)
- Base defense: 3–3–5
- Home stadium: Milan Puskar Stadium

2009 Big East Conference football standings
	Conf.			Overall
Team	W		L	W		L
No. 8 Cincinnati $	7	–	0	12	–	1
No. 25 West Virginia	5	–	2	9	–	4
No. 15 Pittsburgh	5	–	2	10	–	3
Rutgers	3	–	4	9	–	4
Connecticut	3	–	4	8	–	5
South Florida	3	–	4	8	–	5
Louisville	1	–	6	4	–	8
Syracuse	1	–	6	4	–	8
$ – BCS representative as conference champion; Rankings from AP Poll

The 2009 West Virginia Mountaineers football team represented West Virginia University as a member of the Big East Conference during the 2009 NCAA Division I FBS football season. Led by second-year head coach Bill Stewart, the Mountaineers compiled an overall record of 9–4 with a mark of 5–2 in conference play, tying for second place in the Big East. West Virginia was invited the Gator Bowl, where the Mountaineers lost to Florida State. The team played home games at Milan Puskar Stadium in Morgantown, West Virginia.

== Schedule ==
Date	Time	Opponent	Rank	Site	TV	Result	Attendance	Source
September 5	12:00 p.m.	Liberty*		Milan Puskar Stadium; Morgantown, WV	ESPN Plus	W 33–20	57,950	
September 12	3:30 p.m.	East Carolina*		Milan Puskar Stadium; Morgantown, WV	ESPN360	W 35–20	59,216	
September 19	7:45 p.m.	at Auburn*		Jordan–Hare Stadium; Auburn, AL	ESPN2	L 30–41	87,451	
October 1	7:30 p.m.	Colorado*		Milan Puskar Stadium; Morgantown, WV (Gold Rush)	ESPN	W 35–24	60,055	
October 10	12:00 p.m.	at Syracuse		Carrier Dome; Syracuse, NY (rivalry)	ESPN Plus	W 34–13	40,144	
October 17	3:30 p.m.	Marshall*		Milan Puskar Stadium; Morgantown, WV (Friends of Coal Bowl)	ESPN Plus	W 24–7	54,432	
October 24	12:00 p.m.	Connecticut^{†}	No. 22	Milan Puskar Stadium; Morgantown, WV	ESPNU	W 28–24	58,106	
October 30	8:00 p.m.	at South Florida	No. 20	Raymond James Stadium; Tampa, Florida	ESPN2	L 19–30	56,328	
November 7	12:00 p.m.	Louisville		Milan Puskar Stadium; Morgantown, WV	ESPN Plus	W 17–9	55,334	
November 13	8:00 p.m.	at No. 5 Cincinnati		Nippert Stadium; Cincinnati, OH	ESPN2	L 21–24	35,105	
November 27	7:00 p.m.	No. 8 Pittsburgh		Milan Puskar Stadium; Morgantown, WV (Backyard Brawl)	ESPN2	W 19–16	56,123	
December 5	12:00 p.m.	at Rutgers	No. 24	Rutgers Stadium; Piscataway, NJ	ESPN	W 24–21	52,534	
January 1	1:00 p.m.	vs. Florida State*	No. 18	Jacksonville Municipal Stadium; Jacksonville, FL (Gator Bowl)	CBS	L 21–33	84,129	
*Non-conference game; ^{†}Homecoming; Rankings from AP Poll released prior to the game; All times are in Eastern time

== Rankings ==
Ranking movements Legend: ██ Increase in ranking ██ Decrease in ranking — = Not ranked
	Week															
Poll	Pre	1	2	3	4	5	6	7	8	9	10	11	12	13	14	Final
AP	—	—	—	—	—	—	—	22	20	—	—	—	—	24	18	25
Coaches	—	—	—	—	—	—	—	22	20	—	23	—	—	23	17	22
Harris	Not released					—	—	23	20	—	24	—	—	25	18	Not released
BCS	Not released							23	21	—	25	—	—	23	16	Not released

== Game summaries ==
=== Liberty ===
	1	2	3	4	Total
Flames	3	7	3	7	20
Mountaineers	10	13	3	7	33

Jarrett Brown completed 19 of 26 passes for 243 yards and ran for a 22-yard touchdown, and redshirt freshman Tyler Bitancurt kicked four field goals to lead West Virginia to a 33–20 season-opening victory over Liberty.

=== East Carolina ===
	1	2	3	4	Total
Pirates	10	10	0	0	20
Mountaineers	7	14	7	7	35

West Virginia was able to overcome a mistake filled day to gain some payback on the East Carolina Pirates. Quarterback Jarrett Brown had a career day completing 24 of 31 passes for 334 yards and 4 touchdowns, including a 58-yard bomb to freshman Tavon Austin. Brown also picked up 73 yards on the ground.

=== Auburn ===
	1	2	3	4	Total
Mountaineers	21	0	9	0	30
Tigers	10	10	7	14	41

All-time record: Tied 1–1

This was the second meeting between West Virginia and Auburn, with the Mountaineers winning the first game 34–17 during the 2008 season.

=== Colorado ===
	1	2	3	4	Total
Buffaloes	7	3	7	7	24
Mountaineers	7	7	7	14	35

All-time record: Tied 1–1

This was the second meeting between West Virginia and Colorado, with the Buffaloes winning the first game 17–14 in overtime during the 2008 season. The game was designated a Gold Rush, meaning that fans attended the game wearing all gold. West Virginia scored early with a Noel Devine 77-yard touchdown run on the second play from scrimmage. Colorado responded with a 36-yard run from tailback Rodney Stewart. They then took the lead by making a 39-yard field goal.(He had missed 2 field goals earlier in the game.)West Virginia responded with a 6-yard touchdown pass from Jarrett Brown to Jock Sanders. Despite 4 fumbles lost in the first half for West Virginia, they still led 14–10 at halftime. The second half started with a 48-yard touchdown pass to receiver Bradley Starks to put the Mountaineers up 21–10, Colorado responded by converting on 4th and 10 for a 26-yard touchdown to trim the lead to 4. In the 4th quarter, freshmen fullback Ryan Clarke rumbled for a 1-yard touchdown run, and later ran for an 8-yard run putting the Mountaineers up 35–17 with 2 minutes to play. Colorado scored the final touchdown of the night with 3 seconds left, but it was too late for any sort of comeback as the Mountaineers won 35–24. Noel Devine had a career-high 220 yards rushing with an average of 10 yards per carry.

=== Syracuse ===
	1	2	3	4	Total
Mountaineers	14	13	0	7	34
Orange	0	0	6	7	13

WVU jumped out to a 27–0 halftime lead en route to beating the Orange for an 8th straight time. Jarrett Brown completed 22–30 passing for 244 yards and a touchdown pass to Noel Devine, who also had 97 yards on the ground with a touchdown.

=== Marshall ===
	1	2	3	4	Total
Thundering Herd	7	0	0	0	7
Mountaineers	0	3	7	14	24

Starting QB Jarrett Brown was knocked out of the game on the Mountaineer's opening drive, forcing true freshman Geno Smith to step in. The emotional punch of having Brown out of the game showed as Marshall was able to head into the half with a 7–3 lead. WVU responded by scoring on its first possession of the second half, on the way to 21 second half points. Smith finished 15–21 passing for 147 yards and a touchdown, Noel Devine added 103 yards on the ground scoring 2 touchdowns

=== Connecticut ===
	1	2	3	4	Total
Huskies	7	10	0	7	24
#22 Mountaineers	7	7	7	7	28

=== South Florida ===
	1	2	3	4	Total
#20 Mountaineers	9	3	7	0	19
Bulls	10	10	7	3	30

=== Louisville ===
	1	2	3	4	Total
Cardinals	0	6	0	3	9
Mountaineers	0	7	10	0	17

=== Cincinnati ===
	1	2	3	4	Total
Mountaineers	7	7	0	7	21
#5 Bearcats	7	7	7	3	24

=== Pittsburgh ===
	1	2	3	4	Total
#8 Panthers	0	3	3	10	16
Mountaineers	0	3	10	6	19

West Virginia's Tyler Bitancurt kicked a 43-yard field goal as time expired to give WVU a win in the 102nd Backyard Brawl. The 2009 Backyard Brawl, broadcast by ESPN2, was the most watched college football game in the history of ESPN2.

=== Rutgers ===
	1	2	3	4	Total
#24 Mountaineers	14	0	7	3	24
Scarlet Knights	3	0	11	7	21

=== Florida State ===
	1	2	3	4	Total
#18 Mountaineers	14	0	0	7	21
Seminoles	3	10	10	10	33

2010 Konica Minolta Gator Bowl marked the final game for legendary Florida State coach Bobby Bowden, who also spent six seasons as head coach at West Virginia.

== Statistics ==
=== Team statistics through six games (October 18) ===
	WVU	OPP
SCORING	191	125
Points per Game	31.8	20.8
FIRST DOWNS	121	95
Rushing	55	29
Passing	60	57
Penalty	6	9
RUSHING YARDAGE	1,108	481
Rushing Yards Gained	1,279	661
Rushing Yards Lost	171	180
Rushing Attempts	223	182
Average Per Rush	5.0	2.6
Average Per Game	184.7	80.2
Rushing TDs	16	4
PASSING YARDAGE	1,451	1,276
Comp-Att-Int	120–174–6	111–220–9
Average Per Pass	8.3	5.8
Average Per Catch	12.1	11.5
Average Per Game	241.1	212.7
Passing TDs	9	10
TOTAL OFFENSE	2,559	1,757
Total Plays	397	402
Avg per Play	6.4	4.4
Avg per Game	426.5	292.8

	WVU	OPP				
KICK RETURNS: #-Yards-TD	24–518–0	34–736–0				
KICK RETURN AVERAGE	21.6	21.6				
PUNT RETURNS: #-Yards-TD	13–160–0	11–111–0				
PUNT RETURN AVERAGE	12.3	10.1				
FUMBLES-LOST	16–11	8–3				
PENALTIES-Yards	36–337	37–305	−0	Avg per Game	56.2	50.8
PUNTS-Yards	23–1,065	34–1,410				
Avg Per Punt	46.3	41.5				
Net Punt Average	38.9	35.0				
TIME OF POSSESSION/Game	31:32	28:28				
3RD DOWN CONVERSIONS	35/76	32/95				
3rd Down Pct	46%	34%				
4TH DOWN CONVERSIONS	1/4	4/9				
4th Down Pct	25%	44%				
SACKS BY-Yards	14–88	9–89				
TOUCHDOWNS SCORED	25	15				
RED-ZONE SCORING	20–23 87%	9–12 75%				
FIELD GOALS-ATTEMPTS	6–6	7–11				
PAT-ATTEMPTS	23–24 96%	14–15 93%				
ATTENDANCE	231,653	127,595				
Games/Avg per Game	3/59,074	2/63,798				

==== Scores by quarter ====
	1	2	3	4	Total
West Virginia	59	50	33	49	191
Opponents	37	30	23	35	125

=== Offense ===
==== Rushing ====
Name	GP	Att	Net	Avg	TD	Long	Avg/G
Noel Devine	6	114	734	6.4	9	77	122.3
Jarrett Brown	6	50	209	4.2	1	26	34.8
Jock Sanders	6	11	62	5.9	1	12	10.8
Ryan Clarke	5	19	61	3.2	5	4	12.2
Shawne Alston	5	6	18	3.0	0	8	3.6
Geno Smith	3	7	15	2.1	0	13	5.0
Tavon Austin	6	2	8	4.0	0	4	1.3
Coley White	1	3	7	2.3	0	13	7.0
Mark Rodgers	6	4	5	1.2	0	4	0.8
Brad Starks	5	2	−3	−1.5	0	2	−0.5
TEAM	5	5	−11	−2.2	0	0	−2.2
Total	6	223	1,108	5.0	16	77	184.7
Opponents	6	182	481	2.6	4	36	80.2

==== Passing ====
Name	GP	Att-Comp	Pct	Yds	TD	INT	Lng	Avg/G
Jarrett Brown	6	96–140	68.6	1,209	8	5	58	201.5
Geno Smith	3	23–33	69.7	211	1	1	33	70.0
Brad Starks	6	1–1	100	31	0	0	31	5.2
Total	6	120–174	69.0	1,451	9	6	58	241.0
Opponents	6	111–220	50.5	1,279	10	9	82	212.7

==== Receiving ====
Name	GP	No.	Yds	Avg	TD	Long	Avg/G
Jock Sanders	5	41	394	9.6	2	38	78.8
Brad Starks	5	14	296	21.1	1	58	59.2
Alric Arnett	5	14	194	13.9	2	46	38.8
Noel Devine	5	11	72	6.5	1	17	14.4
Tavon Austin	5	8	103	12.9	1	58	20.6
Wes Lyons	5	6	76	12.7	0	16	15.2
Tyler Urban	5	4	72	18.0	0	33	14.4
Will Johnson	5	4	63	15.8	1	33	12.6
Ryan Clark	5	2	15	7.5	0	9	3.0
Total	5	104	1,285	12.4	8	58	257.0
Opponents	5	94	1,127	12.0	10	82	225.4

=== Special teams ===
Name	Punting								Kickoffs				
Name	No.	Yds	Avg	Long	TB	FC	I20	Blkd	No.	Yds	Avg	TB	OB
Total													

Name	Punt returns					Kick returns				
Name	No.	Yds	Avg	TD	Long	No.	Yds	Avg	TD	Long
Total										
