= Lindsey Witten =

American gridiron football player (born 1988)

No. 91
- Position: Defensive end

Personal information
- Born: April 28, 1988 (age 38)
- Listed height: 6 ft 4 in (1.93 m)
- Listed weight: 250 lb (113 kg)

Career information
- High school: Glenville (Cleveland, Ohio)
- College: Connecticut
- NFL draft: 2010: undrafted

Career history
- Pittsburgh Steelers (2010)*; Hartford Colonials (2010); Calgary Stampeders (2011); Chicago Rush (2012); Cleveland Gladiators (2013)*; Edmonton Eskimos (2013)*
- * Offseason or practice squad member only

Career AFL statistics
- Total tackles: 3
- Stats at ArenaFan.com

Lindsey Rashaun Witten (born April 28, 1988) is an American former football defensive end. He was signed by the Pittsburgh Steelers as an undrafted free agent in 2010. He was cut at the end of camp and signed by the Hartford Colonials of the United Football League (UFL). He played college football at the University of Connecticut.

== Early life ==
Witten was an All-State honorable mention pick from Ohio who made 98 tackles and had 22 sacks in his senior year. High school is one of the top programs in the state of Ohio as the Tarblooders had 15 Division I signees in Witten's senior class. Glenville advanced to the 2004 state Division 1 semifinals.

== College career ==
Witten played his career at the University of Connecticut Witten was a First Team All-Big East selection in 2009. He was considered one of the top defensive end prospects available for the 2010 NFL draft.

== Professional career ==
=== Pittsburgh Steelers ===
Witten went undrafted in the 2010 NFL draft. The Pittsburgh Steelers signed him as a free agent after the draft. Witten was released by the Steelers during July 2010 training camp.

=== Hartford Colonials ===
The Hartford Colonials signed Witten as a free agent on August 5, 2010. Witten never played a down for Hartford.

=== Calgary Stampeders ===
The Calgary Stampeders signed Witten as a free agent on May 16, 2011.

=== United States Navy ===
Currently serving in United States Navy, as 3rd Class Petty Officer. Rated Aviation Administrationman.

== Personal life ==
He is the younger brother of former NFL safety Donte Whitner.
