= 2009 Louisville Cardinals football team =

American college football season

2009 Louisville Cardinals football
- Conference: Big East Conference
- Record: 4–8 (1–6 Big East)
- Head coach: Steve Kragthorpe (3rd season)
- Offensive scheme: Multiple
- Defensive coordinator: Brent Guy (1st season)
- Base defense: 4–3
- Home stadium: Papa John's Cardinal Stadium

2009 Big East Conference football standings
	Conf.			Overall
Team	W		L	W		L
No. 8 Cincinnati $	7	–	0	12	–	1
No. 25 West Virginia	5	–	2	9	–	4
No. 15 Pittsburgh	5	–	2	10	–	3
Rutgers	3	–	4	9	–	4
Connecticut	3	–	4	8	–	5
South Florida	3	–	4	8	–	5
Louisville	1	–	6	4	–	8
Syracuse	1	–	6	4	–	8
$ – BCS representative as conference champion; Rankings from AP Poll

The 2009 Louisville Cardinals football team represented the University of Louisville in the 2009 NCAA Division I FBS football season. The Cardinals were coached by Steve Kragthorpe, who was in his third season at Louisville. The Cardinals played their home games at Papa John's Cardinal Stadium. The Cardinals finished the season with a record 4–8 and 1–6 in Big East play. Kragthorpe was fired at the end of the season.

== Schedule ==
Date	Time	Opponent	Site	TV	Result	Attendance	Source
September 5	7:30 pm	Indiana State*	Papa John's Cardinal Stadium; Louisville, KY	WHAS	W 30–10	39,344	
September 19	12:00 pm	at Kentucky*	Commonwealth Stadium; Lexington, KY (Governor's Cup)	ESPNU	L 27–31	70,988	
September 26	7:30 pm	at Utah*	Rice–Eccles Stadium; Salt Lake City, UT	CBSCS	L 14–30	45,588	
October 2	8:00 pm	Pittsburgh	Papa John's Cardinal Stadium; Louisville, KY	ESPN2	L 10–35	39,948	
October 10	7:30 pm	Southern Miss*^{†}	Papa John's Cardinal Stadium; Louisville, KY	ESPNU	W 25–23	37,268	
October 17	12:00 pm	at Connecticut	Rentschler Field; East Hartford, CT	Big East Network	L 25–38	40,000	
October 24	3:30 pm	at No. 6 Cincinnati	Nippert Stadium; Cincinnati, OH (The Keg of Nails)	ESPNU	L 10–41	35,099	
October 31	3:30 pm	Arkansas State*	Papa John's Cardinal Stadium; Louisville, KY	WHAS	W 21–13	21,497	
November 7	12:00 pm	at West Virginia	Milan Puskar Stadium; Morgantown, WV	Big East Network	L 9–17	55,334	
November 14	12:00 pm	Syracuse	Papa John's Cardinal Stadium; Louisville, KY	Big East Network	W 10–9	33,223	
November 21	12:00 pm	at South Florida	Raymond James Stadium; Tampa, FL	Big East Network	L 22–34	49,388	
November 27	11:00 am	Rutgers	Papa John's Cardinal Stadium; Louisville, KY	ESPN2	L 14–34	23,422	
*Non-conference game; ^{†}Homecoming; Rankings from Coaches' Poll released prior to the game; All times are in Eastern time

== Roster ==
2009 Louisville Cardinals football team roster
Players
Coaches
Offense

Pos.	#	Name	Class
QB	2	Will Stein	Fr
WR	3	Trent Guy	Sr
WR	4	Maurice Clark	Sr
RB	5	Boogie McCray	Fr
WR	6	Sean Farr	Fr
WR	7	Damian Copeland	Fr
RB	8	Darius Ashley	Fr
QB	9	Adam Froman	Jr
WR	10	Jahmal Lawson	So
WR	11	Josh Chichester	So
QB	13	Justin Burke	Jr
WR	14	Andrell Smith	Fr
RB	15	Bilal Powell	Jr
WR	17	DeMarcus Topp	Fr
QB	18	Zack Stoudt	Fr
RB	20	Victor Anderson	So
WR	21	Troy Pascley	Jr
WR	23	Mike Hayes
RB	25	Malik Curtley	Fr
WR	26	John King
WR	27	Doug Beaumont	Jr
RB	28	Jeremy Wright
RB	34	James Miller	Fr
P	35	Jon Payne	Jr
WR	37	Lincoln Carr	So
FB	39	Marcus Roberts
RB	41	Eugene Sowell
RB	45	Blayne Donnell	Jr
FB	48	Joe Tronzo	Sr
C	55	Mario Benavides	Fr
OL	62	John Clark	So
G/C	65	Josh Byrom	Jr
OL	66	Alex Kupper
OL	67	Nick Egart	So
OL	70	Conrad Thomas
G	71	Abdul Kuyateh
OL	72	Hunter Stout
OL	73	Hector Hernandez	So
OT	74	Jeff Adams	Jr
OT	75	Ryan Kessling
OT	76	Greg Tomczyk
OL	77	Joe Evinger	Jr
OT	78	Byron Stingily
G	79	Mark Wetterer
TE	80	Mike Fennerty	So
TE	81	Rock Keys
TE	82	Pete Nochta
TE	83	Cameron Graham
WR	84	Scott Long	Sr
TE	85	Nate Nord
FB	86	Zach Meagher
TE	87	Stephon Ball	Fr
WR	88	Andrew Robinson
WR	89	Damion Dixon	Fr

Defense

Pos.	#	Name	Class
S	2	Richard Raglin	Sr
S	3	Isaac Geffrad	Fr
S	4	Chaz Thompson	Sr
LB	5	Brandon Heath	Jr
S	6	Justin Mathews	Sr
CB	7	Karldell Dunning	So
S	8	Hakeem Smith	Fr
CB	9	Preston Pace	Jr
DE	10	Malcolm Mitchell	Fr
DE	11	Greg Scruggs	So
LB	13	Jacob Geffrad	Fr
DB	14	Shenard Holton	Fr
CB	18	Titus Teague	Fr
CB	19	Johnny Patrick	Jr
CB	22	Jacques Caldwell	Fr
LB	23	Stephen Garr	Sr
LB	24	Daniel Brown	Fr
S	25	CJ Peake	So
CB	26	Zed Evans	Fr
CB	28	Ravelle Sadler	So
S	29	Daniel Covington	Sr
CB	31	Champ Lee	Fr
DT	32	Roy Philon	Fr
LB	33	Horace Miller	Fr
CB	35	Anthony Conner	Jr
S	36	Josh Wiley	Sr
LB	38	Jon Dempsey	Sr
CB	42	Bobby Burns	Jr
LB	43	Chris Campa	Sr
LB	44	Bo Eggers	Fr
LB	46	Dexter Heyman	So
S	49	Jon Mattingly	Fr
LB	50	Joshua McDonald	Sr
LB	51	Mike Privott	Fr
LB	52	Antwon Canady	Jr
LB	54	Reinhold Leicht	Jr
DT	56	Tyler Jessen	Sr
LB	57	Mozell Axson	Sr
DE	58	Rodney Gnat	So
DE	61	William Savoy	So
DE	90	Malcolm Tatum	Jr
DT	91	LT Walker	Sr
DT	92	Dominic Langone	Fr
DE	93	LD Scott	Sr
DT	94	Joe Townsend	Jr
DE	96	Patrick Grant	So
DT	97	Tim High	Jr
DT	98	Drew Davis	Fr
DT	99	Zach Kiernan	So

Special teams

Pos.	#	Name	Class
K	12	Chris Philpott	So
K	17	Tim Dougherty	Jr
K	19	Ryan Payne	Sr
P	29	Cory Goettsche
LS	47	Paul Belshoff
LS	60	Daniel Weedman	Jr

Head coach

- Steve Kragthorpe

Coordinators/assistant coaches

- Brent Guy (Defensive coordinator)
- Jay Johnson (Tight ends coach)

Legend

- (C) Team captain
- (S) Suspended
- (I) Ineligible
- Injured
- Redshirt
