= 2009 South Florida Bulls football team =

American college football season

2009 South Florida Bulls football

International Bowl champion

International Bowl, W 27–3 vs. Northern Illinois
- Conference: Big East Conference
- Record: 8–5 (3–4 Big East)
- Head coach: Jim Leavitt (13th season)
- Offensive coordinator: Mike Canales (1st season)
- Offensive scheme: Pro-style
- Defensive coordinator: Joe Tresey (1st season)
- Co-defensive coordinator: David Blackwell (1st season)
- Base defense: 3–4
- Home stadium: Raymond James Stadium

2009 Big East Conference football standings
	Conf.			Overall
Team	W		L	W		L
No. 8 Cincinnati $	7	–	0	12	–	1
No. 25 West Virginia	5	–	2	9	–	4
No. 15 Pittsburgh	5	–	2	10	–	3
Rutgers	3	–	4	9	–	4
Connecticut	3	–	4	8	–	5
South Florida	3	–	4	8	–	5
Louisville	1	–	6	4	–	8
Syracuse	1	–	6	4	–	8
$ – BCS representative as conference champion; Rankings from AP Poll

The 2009 South Florida Bulls football team represented the University of South Florida (USF) in the 2009 NCAA Division I FBS football season. Their head coach was Jim Leavitt, and they played their home games at Raymond James Stadium in Tampa, Florida. The 2009 season was the 13th season overall for the Bulls, and their fifth season in the Big East Conference. The Bulls finished the season 8–5 (3–4 Big East) and won the International Bowl, 27–3, against Northern Illinois. The roster had 11 eventual NFL draft picks and a total of 14 players would go on to play in the NFL.

== Schedule ==
Date	Time	Opponent	Rank	Site	TV	Result	Attendance
September 5	7:00 p.m.	Wofford*		Raymond James Stadium; Tampa, FL	BHSN	W 40–7	40,360
September 12	7:30 p.m.	at Western Kentucky*		Houchens Industries Smith Stadium; Bowling Green, KY	Big East Network	W 35–13	20,568
September 19	7:00 p.m.	Charleston Southern*		Raymond James Stadium; Tampa, FL		W 59–0	38,798
September 26	12:00 p.m.	at No. 18 Florida State*		Doak Campbell Stadium; Tallahassee, FL	ESPNU	W 17–7	83,524
October 3	12:00 p.m.	at Syracuse		Carrier Dome; Syracuse, NY	Big East Network	W 34–20	40,147
October 15	7:30 p.m.	No. 8 Cincinnati	No. 21	Raymond James Stadium; Tampa, FL	ESPN	L 17–34	63,976
October 24	12:00 p.m.	at No. 20 Pittsburgh		Heinz Field; Pittsburgh, PA	Big East Network	L 14–41	50,019
October 30	8:00 p.m.	No. 20 West Virginia		Raymond James Stadium; Tampa, FL	ESPN2	W 30–19	56,328
November 12	7:30 p.m.	at Rutgers	No. 23	Rutgers Stadium; Piscataway, NJ	ESPN	L 0–31	48,057
November 21	12:00 p.m.	Louisville^{†}		Raymond James Stadium; Tampa, FL	Big East Network	W 34–22	49,388
November 28	3:30 p.m.	No. 19 Miami (FL)*		Raymond James Stadium; Tampa, FL	ABC/ESPN	L 10–31	66,469
December 5	8:00 p.m.	at Connecticut		Rentschler Field; East Hartford, CT	ESPN2	L 27–29	35,624
January 2, 2010	12:00 p.m.	vs. Northern Illinois		Rogers Centre; Toronto, ON, Canada (International Bowl)	ESPN2	W 27–3	22,185
*Non-conference game; ^{†}Homecoming; Rankings from AP Poll released prior to the game; All times are in Eastern time

== Rankings ==
Ranking movements Legend: ██ Increase in ranking ██ Decrease in ranking — = Not ranked RV = Received votes
	Week															
Poll	Pre	1	2	3	4	5	6	7	8	9	10	11	12	13	14	Final
AP	RV	RV	RV	RV	RV	23	21	RV	—	RV	23	—	—	—	—	—
Coaches	RV	RV	RV	RV	RV	24	21	RV	—	RV	24	—	RV	—	—	—
Harris	Not released				RV	24	21	24	RV	RV	23	RV	RV	—	—	Not released
BCS	Not released							—	—	25	24	—	—	—	—	Not released

== Roster ==
2009 South Florida Bulls football team roster
Players
Coaches
Offense

Pos.	#	Name	Class
WR	2	Carlton Mitchell	Jr
RB	3	Moise Plancher	Sr
QB	7	B. J. Daniels	Fr
QB	8	Matt Grothe	Sr
WR	9	Theo Wilson	Sr

Defense

Pos.	#	Name	Class
S	5	Nate Allen	Sr
LB	36	Sam Barrington	Fr
DE	90	Jason Pierre-Paul	Jr

Special teams

Pos.	#	Name	Class

Head coach

- Jim Leavitt

Coordinators/assistant coaches

- Mike Canales (OC)
- Joe Tresey (DC)
- David Blackwell (co-DC)
- Kevin Patrick (DL)

Legend

- (C) Team captain
- (S) Suspended
- (I) Ineligible
- Injured
- Redshirt

Roster
