= 2009 Cincinnati Bearcats football team =

American college football season

2009 Cincinnati Bearcats football

Big East champion

Sugar Bowl, L 24–51 vs. Florida
- Conference: Big East Conference

Ranking
- Coaches: No. 9
- AP: No. 8
- Record: 12–1 (7–0 Big East)
- Head coach: Brian Kelly (3rd season; regular season); Jeff Quinn (bowl game)
- Offensive coordinator: Jeff Quinn (3rd season)
- Offensive scheme: Multiple
- Defensive coordinator: Bob Diaco (1st season)
- Base defense: 4–3
- Home stadium: Nippert Stadium

2009 Big East Conference football standings
	Conf.			Overall
Team	W		L	W		L
No. 8 Cincinnati $	7	–	0	12	–	1
No. 25 West Virginia	5	–	2	9	–	4
No. 15 Pittsburgh	5	–	2	10	–	3
Rutgers	3	–	4	9	–	4
Connecticut	3	–	4	8	–	5
South Florida	3	–	4	8	–	5
Louisville	1	–	6	4	–	8
Syracuse	1	–	6	4	–	8
$ – BCS representative as conference champion; Rankings from AP Poll

The 2009 Cincinnati Bearcats football team represented the University of Cincinnati in the 2009 NCAA Division I FBS football season. The team, coached by Brian Kelly, played its home games in Nippert Stadium.

They won their second consecutive Big East Conference championship and played in their second consecutive Bowl Championship Series game, the Sugar Bowl vs Florida. It was also the second BCS bowl appearance in school history.

The Bearcats finished third in the 2009 Bowl Championship Series rankings. The Bearcats became the first team from a BCS conference to finish the regular season unbeaten and be left out of the BCS Championship Game since Auburn in 2004. However, had Texas lost the 2009 Big 12 Championship Game, the Bearcats would have had a realistic shot at playing in the BCS National Championship Game, since they would have been one of only two undefeated teams left from an AQ conference.

Head coach Brian Kelly resigned at the end of the regular season to take the head coaching job at Notre Dame. Offensive coordinator Jeff Quinn coached the Bearcats in the Sugar Bowl. Butch Jones began coaching the team in 2010.

The Bearcats were defeated by Florida 51–24 in the Sugar Bowl to end their undefeated season.

An element of the 2009 team was their adoption of Mitch Stone, a 12-year-old cancer patient, called "a key to this special season".

== Schedule ==
Date	Time	Opponent	Rank	Site	TV	Result	Attendance	Source
September 7	4:00 pm	at Rutgers		Rutgers Stadium; Piscataway, NJ	ESPN	W 47–15	53,737	
September 12	7:30 pm	Southeast Missouri State*	No. 23	Nippert Stadium; Cincinnati, OH	FSN Ohio	W 70–3	30,421	
September 19	6:45 pm	at Oregon State*	No. 17	Reser Stadium; Corvallis, OR	FSN	W 28–18	41,909	
September 26	12:00 pm	Fresno State*	No. 14	Nippert Stadium; Cincinnati, OH (Whiteout Game)	ESPN+	W 28–20	32,910	
October 3	1:00 pm	at Miami (OH)*	No. 10	Yager Stadium; Oxford, OH (Victory Bell)	ESPN360	W 37–13	23,493	
October 15	7:30 pm	at No. 21 South Florida	No. 8	Raymond James Stadium; Tampa, FL	ESPN	W 34–17	63,976	
October 24	3:30 pm	Louisville^{†}	No. 5	Nippert Stadium; Cincinnati, OH (Keg of Nails)	ESPNU	W 41–10	35,099	
October 31	12:00 pm	at Syracuse	No. 5	Carrier Dome; Syracuse, NY	ESPNU	W 28–7	33,802	
November 7	8:00 pm	Connecticut	No. 4	Nippert Stadium; Cincinnati, OH (Blackout Game)	ABC	W 47–45	35,100	
November 13	8:00 pm	West Virginia	No. 5	Nippert Stadium; Cincinnati, OH (Ring of Red Game)	ESPN2	W 24–21	35,105	
November 27	12:00 pm	Illinois*	No. 5	Nippert Stadium; Cincinnati, OH	ABC	W 49–36	35,106	
December 5	12:00 pm	at No. 14 Pittsburgh	No. 5	Heinz Field; Pittsburgh, PA (River City Rivalry)	ABC	W 45–44	63,387	
January 1	8:30 pm	vs. No. 5 Florida	No. 4	Louisiana Superdome; New Orleans, LA (Sugar Bowl)	FOX	L 24–51	65,207	
*Non-conference game; ^{†}Homecoming; Rankings from AP Poll released prior to the game; All times are in Eastern time

== Rankings ==
Ranking movements Legend: ██ Increase in ranking ██ Decrease in ranking — = Not ranked
	Week															
Poll	Pre	1	2	3	4	5	6	7	8	9	10	11	12	13	14	Final
AP	—	23	17	14	10	8	8	5	5	4	5	5	5	5	4	8
Coaches	—	23	21	15	11	10	9	6	7	7	5	5	5	5	4	9
Harris	Not released				10	9	8	6	6	5	5	5	5	5	4	Not released
BCS	Not released							5	8	5	5	5	5	5	3	Not released

== Game summaries ==
Cincinnati successfully defended its Big East title with a thrilling come from behind in win in Pittsburgh. While the game was the regular season finale for both teams it was seen as a de facto conference title game as the winner would have either the best outright conference record (Cincinnati) or the head to head tiebreaker (Pittsburgh) and be award the BCS bowl game slot in the Sugar Bowl. The 15th ranked Panthers started strong taking the opening kickoff and driving right down field to score with Dion Lewis scoring from 4 yards out. The Bearcats responded with a quick touchdown drive to tie the game, Jacob Ramsey bulling in from 2 yards out. The teams ended the first quarter tied at 7. The Panthers pounded the Bearcats with 24 second quarter points as they utilized the pinpoint passing of Bill Stull to score seemingly at will. Stull found Jon Baldwin twice for scores, Dan Hutchins added a 33-yard field goal and Stull run a QB sneak in from 3 yards out and the Panthers were up 31-10 and looking to put the game out of reach but on the ensuing kickoff after the Stull TD run. Mardy Gilyard took the kickoff at the one found a crease and raced 99 yards for a touchdown. That score seemed to stunt the Panthers title hopes. Though the Bearcats would only score once in the 3rd quarter on another long Gilyard score, this time on a 68-yard pass from Tony Pike, the Bearcats held the Panthers scoreless in the 3rd and would head to the decisive 4th down only 31–24. The deficit ballooned back to 14 on another scoring run from Lewis, the Bearcats got yet another long kick return from Gilyard and DJ Woods snagged an 8-yard touchdown pass from Pike. The extra point missed and the Bearcats trailed 38-30 The Bearcats tied the game on a short run by Isaiah Pead and a successful 2 point conversion and the Bearcats had fought back to level the game at 38. The Panthers were not done, though. Driving 67 yards in 4:10, Dion Lewis scored his 3rd touchdown of the game. Hutchins missed the extra point but the Panthers had a 44–38 lead with 1:36 left and dreams of crashing the Bearcats Big East title and BCS hopes in the snowy afternoon. But Pike and the Bearcats had other ideas. Racing back down field in just 63 seconds, the Bearcats were at the Panther 29. Pike dropped back to pass and found Armon Binns streaking down the sideline. His perfectly lobbed pass found a tumbling Binns in the end zone for the Bearcats first lead of the day with a scant 33 seconds left. The Panthers could do nothing with the time they had left and the Bearcats would celebrate its 2nd consecutive Big East Title and BCS Bowl berth. The Bearcats would finish the regular season with unbeaten for the first time in school history and its 12 wins would be a school record. The Bearcats would head to the bowl without Brian Kelly as it was announced just days after the game that he had accepted the head coaching position at Notre Dame. Jeff Quinn would coach the Bearcats in the Sugar Bowl and then he too would depart as he had accepted the head coaching position at Buffalo.

=== Pittsburgh ===
Pittsburgh

Quarter	1	2	3	4	Total
Cincinnati	7	10	7	21	45
Pittsburgh	7	24	0	13	44

at Heinz Field, Pittsburgh

- Date: December 5
- Game time: 12:00 p.m.
- Game weather: Flurries, 30 °F (−1 °C)
- Game attendance: 63,387
- Referee: Gerard McGinn
- TV announcers (ABC): Sean McDonough (Play-by-play), Matt Millen (Color) & Holly Rowe (Sideline)
- Recap

Scoring summary

Quarter	Time	Drive			Team	Scoring information	Score	
Quarter	Time	Plays	Yards	TOP	Team	Scoring information	Cincinnati	Pittsburgh
1	7:27		56	6:29	Pittsburgh	Dion Lewis 4-yard touchdown run, Dan Hutchins kick good	0	7
1	5:17		66	2:10	Cincinnati	Jacob Ramsey 2-yard touchdown run, Jacob Rogers kick good	7	7
2	14:13		68	6:04	Pittsburgh	Jon Baldwin 22-yard touchdown reception from Bill Stull, Dan Hutchins kick good	7	14
2	11:12		76	3:01	Cincinnati	20-yard field goal by Jacob Rogers	10	14
2	10:28		63	:44	Pittsburgh	Jon Baldwin 40-yard touchdown reception from Bill Stull, Dan Hutchins kick good	10	21
2	4:53		33	4:32	Pittsburgh	33-yard field goal by Dan Hutchins	10	24
2	1:26		5	1:23	Pittsburgh	Bill Stull 3-yard touchdown run, Dan Hutchins kick good	10	31
2	1:10				Cincinnati	Mardy Gilyard 99 yard kickoff return, Jacob Rogers kick good	17	31
3	8:12		78	1:38	Cincinnati	Mardy Gilyard 68-yard touchdown reception from Tony Pike, Jacob Rogers kick good	24	31
4	12:26		32	1:51	Pittsburgh	Dion Lewis 15-yard touchdown run, Dan Hutchins kick good	24	38
4	11:09		23	1:17	Cincinnati	DJ Woods 8-yard touchdown reception from Tony Pike, Jacob Rogers kick failed	30	38
4	5:46		68	3:08	Cincinnati	Isaiah Pead 1-yard touchdown run, 2-point pass good	38	38
4	1:36		67	4:10	Pittsburgh	Dion Lewis 5-yard touchdown run, 2-point run failed	38	44
4	:33		61	1:03	Cincinnati	Armon Binns 29-yard touchdown reception from Tony Pike, Jacob Rogers kick good	45	44
"TOP" = time of possession. For other American football terms, see Glossary of American football.							45	44

== Roster ==
2009 Cincinnati Bearcats football team roster
Players
Coaches
Offense

Pos.	#	Name	Class
QB	14	Chazz Anderson	Jr
TE	86	Blake Annen	Fr
WR	80	Armon Binns	Jr
WR	1	Mardy Gilyard	Sr
C	60	Jason Kelce	Jr
TE	18	Travis Kelce	Fr
OT	71	Jeff Linkenbach	Sr
RB	23	Isaiah Pead	So
QB	15	Tony Pike	Sr
TE	88	Adrien Robinson	So

Defense

Pos.	#	Name	Class
DT	40	John Hughes	So
DE	90	Ricardo Mathews	Sr
LB	37	J. K. Schaffer	So
DT	78	Derek Wolfe	So
LB	27	Jeremy Matthews	So

Special teams

Pos.	#	Name	Class
LS	93	Mike Windt	Sr

Head coach

- Brian Kelly

Coordinators/assistant coaches

- Bill Ennis-Inge – Linebackers

Legend

- (C) Team captain
- (S) Suspended
- (I) Ineligible
- Injured
- Redshirt

Roster

== Awards and milestones ==
=== All-Americans ===
- Mardy Gilyard, WR
- Andre Revels, LB 3rd Team Sporting News All American

=== Post-season finalists and winners ===
- Home Depot Coach of the Year Award - Brian Kelly
- Eddie Robinson Coach of the Year Award - Brian Kelly (finalist)
- Paul "Bear" Bryant Award - Brian Kelly (finalist)
- Liberty Mutual Coach of the Year Award - Brian Kelly (finalist)
- George Munger Award - Brian Kelly (finalist)

=== Big East Conference honors ===
- Special Teams Player of the Year: Mardy Gilyard
- Coach of the Year: Brian Kelly

==== Offensive player of the week ====
- Week 1: Tony Pike
- Week 4: Mardy Gilyard
- Week 9: Zach Collaros
- Week 12: Tony Pike
- Week 13: Tony Pike

==== Special teams player of the week ====
- Week 2: Mardy Gilyard
- Week 6: Jacob Rodgers
- Week 9: Jacob Rodgers
- Week 13: Mardy Gilyard

==== Big East Conference All-Conference First Team ====
- Mardy Gilyard, WR
- Chris Jurek, OL
- Tony Pike, QB
- Mardy Gilyard, KR
- Aaron Webster, DB

==== Big East Conference All-Conference Second Team ====
- Armon Binns, WR
- Jason Kelce, OL
- Alex Hoffman, OL
- Jeff Linkenbach, OL
- Ben Guidugli, TE
- Ricardo Mathews, DL

== Players in the 2010 NFL draft ==
Player	Position	Round	Pick	NFL club
Mardy Gilyard	WR	4	99	St. Louis Rams
Tony Pike	QB	6	204	Carolina Panthers
Ricardo Mathews	DT	7	238	Indianapolis Colts
