= 2009 Rutgers Scarlet Knights football team =

American college football season

2009 Rutgers Scarlet Knights football
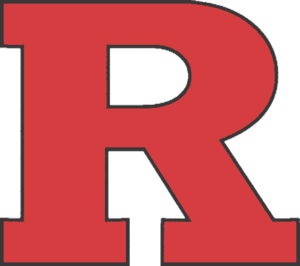

St. Petersburg Bowl champion

St. Petersburg Bowl, W 45–24 vs. UCF
- Conference: Big East Conference
- Record: 9–4 (3–4 Big East)
- Head coach: Greg Schiano (9th season)
- Co-offensive coordinators: Kirk Ciarrocca (1st season); Kyle Flood (1st season)
- Offensive scheme: Pro spread
- Co-defensive coordinators: Bob Fraser (1st season); Ed Pinkham (1st season)
- Base defense: 4–3
- Home stadium: Rutgers Stadium

2009 Big East Conference football standings
	Conf.			Overall
Team	W		L	W		L
No. 8 Cincinnati $	7	–	0	12	–	1
No. 25 West Virginia	5	–	2	9	–	4
No. 15 Pittsburgh	5	–	2	10	–	3
Rutgers	3	–	4	9	–	4
Connecticut	3	–	4	8	–	5
South Florida	3	–	4	8	–	5
Louisville	1	–	6	4	–	8
Syracuse	1	–	6	4	–	8
$ – BCS representative as conference champion; Rankings from AP Poll

The 2009 Rutgers Scarlet Knights football team represented Rutgers University in the 2009 NCAA Division I FBS football season. Their head coach was Greg Schiano and they played their home games at Rutgers Stadium in Piscataway, New Jersey. The Scarlet Knights finished the season 9–4, 3–4 in Big East play and won the St. Petersburg Bowl, 45–24, over UCF.

== Schedule ==
Date	Time	Opponent	Rank	Site	TV	Result	Attendance	Source
September 7	4:00 pm	Cincinnati		Rutgers Stadium; Piscataway, NJ	ESPN	L 15–47	53,737	
September 12	3:30 pm	Howard*		Rutgers Stadium; Piscataway, NJ	Big East Network	W 45–7	43,722	
September 19	5:00 pm	FIU*		Rutgers Stadium; Piscataway, NJ	Big East Network	W 23–15	45,273	
September 26	3:30 pm	at Maryland*		Byrd Stadium; College Park, MD	ESPN360	W 34–13	43,848	
October 10	3:30 pm	Texas Southern*^{†}		Rutgers Stadium; Piscataway, NJ		W 42–0	50,169	
October 16	8:00 pm	Pittsburgh		Rutgers Stadium; Piscataway, NJ	ESPN	L 17–24	50,296	
October 23	8:00 pm	at Army*		Michie Stadium; West Point, NY	ESPN2	W 27–10	24,098	
October 31	12:00 pm	at Connecticut		Rentschler Field; East Hartford, CT	Big East Network	W 28–24	37,045	
November 12	7:30 pm	No. 23 South Florida		Rutgers Stadium; Piscataway, NJ	ESPN	W 31–0	48,057	
November 21	3:30 pm	at Syracuse	No. 25	Carrier Dome; Syracuse, NY	ESPN360	L 13–31	36,759	
November 27	11:00 am	at Louisville		Papa John's Cardinal Stadium; Louisville, KY	ESPN2	W 34–14	23,422	
December 5	12:00 pm	No. 24 West Virginia		Rutgers Stadium; Piscataway, NJ	ESPN	L 21–24	52,534	
December 19	8:00 pm	vs. UCF		Tropicana Field; St. Petersburg, FL (St. Petersburg Bowl)	ESPN	W 45–24	29,763	
*Non-conference game; ^{†}Homecoming; Rankings from AP Poll released prior to the game; All times are in Eastern time

Note: All Big East Network games were produced by ESPN Plus and shown locally on SNY.
