= 1984 Major League Baseball draft =

Baseball draft of amateur players by Major League Baseball

General information
- Date(s): June 1984
- Location: Madison Square Garden, New York, New York, United States

Overview
- 839 total selections
- First selection: Shawn Abner; New York Mets
- First round selections: 28
- Hall of Famers: 2: P Greg Maddux; P Tom Glavine

The 1984 Major League Baseball draft took place in June 1984. The draft saw the New York Mets select Shawn Abner first overall.

== First round selections ==
= All-Star	= Baseball Hall of Famer

The following are the first round picks in the 1984 Major League Baseball draft.

Pick	Player	Team	Position	Hometown/School
1	Shawn Abner	New York Mets	Outfield	Mechanicsburg Area Senior High School (PA)
2	Bill Swift	Seattle Mariners	Pitcher	Maine
3	Drew Hall	Chicago Cubs	Pitcher	Morehead State
4	Cory Snyder	Cleveland Indians	Shortstop	BYU
5	Pat Pacillo	Cincinnati Reds	Pitcher	Seton Hall
6	Erik Pappas	California Angels	Catcher	Mount Carmel High School (IL)
7	Mike Dunne	St. Louis Cardinals	Pitcher	Bradley
8	Jay Bell	Minnesota Twins	Shortstop	Gonzalez Tate High School
9	Alan Cockrell	San Francisco Giants	Outfield	Tennessee
10	Mark McGwire	Oakland Athletics	First Base	USC
11	Shane Mack	San Diego Padres	Outfield	UCLA
12	Oddibe McDowell	Texas Rangers	Outfield	Arizona State
13	Bob Caffrey	Montreal Expos	Catcher	Cal State Fullerton
14	John Marzano	Boston Red Sox	Catcher	Temple
15	Kevin Andersh	Pittsburgh Pirates	Pitcher	New Mexico
16	Scott Bankhead	Kansas City Royals	Pitcher	North Carolina
17	Don August	Houston Astros	Pitcher	Chapman University
18	Isaiah Clark	Milwaukee Brewers	Shortstop	Crockett High School
19	Drew Denson	Atlanta Braves	First Base	Purcell Marian High School
20	Tony Menéndez	Chicago White Sox	Pitcher	American High School (FL)
21	Pete Smith	Philadelphia Phillies	Pitcher	Burlington High School (MA)
22	Jeff Pries	New York Yankees	Pitcher	UCLA
23	Dennis Livingston	Los Angeles Dodgers	Pitcher	Oklahoma State
24	Terry Mulholland	San Francisco Giants	Pitcher	Marietta College
25	John Hoover	Baltimore Orioles	Pitcher	Fresno State
26	David Jerore	Cincinnati Reds	Pitcher	Aquinas High School (MI)
27	Gary Green	San Diego Padres	Shortstop	Oklahoma State
28	Norm Charlton	Montreal Expos	Pitcher	Rice

== Other notable players ==
- Jeff Blauser†, 1st round (secondary phase), 4th overall by the Atlanta Braves
- Greg Maddux‡, 2nd round, 31st overall by the Chicago Cubs
- John Farrell, 2nd round, 32nd overall by the Cleveland Indians
- Tom Glavine‡, 2nd round, 47th overall by the Atlanta Braves
- Marvin Freeman, 2nd round, 49th overall by the Philadelphia Phillies
- Al Leiter†, 2nd round, 50th overall by the New York Yankees
- Ken Caminiti†, 3rd round, 71st overall by the Houston Astros
- Greg Myers, 3rd round, 74th overall by the Toronto Blue Jays
- Dwight Smith, 3rd round (secondary phase), 62nd overall by the Chicago Cubs
- Mike Henneman†, 4th round, 104th overall by the Detroit Tigers
- Jamie Moyer†, 6th round, 135th overall by the Chicago Cubs
- Lance Johnson†, 6th round, 139th overall by the St. Louis Cardinals
- Todd Burns, 7th round, 168th overall by the Oakland Athletics
- Jody Reed, 8th round, 198th overall by the Boston Red Sox
- John Vander Wal, 8th round, 201st overall by the Houston Astros, but did not sign
- Rich Rodriguez, 9th round, 211th overall by the New York Mets
- John Wetteland†, 12th round, 289th overall by the New York Mets, but did not sign
- Jeff Brantley†, 13th round, 327th overall by the Montreal Expos, but did not sign
- John Jaha†, 14th round, 358th overall by the Milwaukee Brewers
- Chuck Finley†, 15th round, 372nd overall by the California Angels, but did not sign
- Darren Holmes, 16th round, 415th overall by the Los Angeles Dodgers
- Dante Bichette†, 17th round, 424th overall by the California Angels
- Gene Larkin, 20th round, 504th overall by the Minnesota Twins
- Jack McDowell†, 20th round, 510th overall by the Boston Red Sox, but did not sign
- Jeff Fassero, 22nd round, 554th overall by the St. Louis Cardinals
- Eric Bolling, 22nd round, 561st overall by the Pittsburgh Pirates
- Jeff Nelson†, 22nd round, 569th overall by the Los Angeles Dodgers
- Mike Devereaux, 26th round, 644th overall by the Cleveland Indians, but did not sign
- Don Wakamatsu, 51st round, 839th overall by the New York Yankees, but did not sign

† All-Star
‡ Hall of Famer

=== NFL/CFL players drafted ===
- Damon Allen, 7th round, 182nd overall by the Detroit Tigers, but did not sign
- Mike Prior, 18th round, 469th overall by the Baltimore Orioles, but did not sign
- Rodney Peete, 30th round, 722nd overall by the Toronto Blue Jays, but did not sign

Preceded by Tim Belcher	1st Overall Picks; Shawn Abner	Succeeded by B.J. Surhoff
