= List of first overall Major League Baseball draft picks =

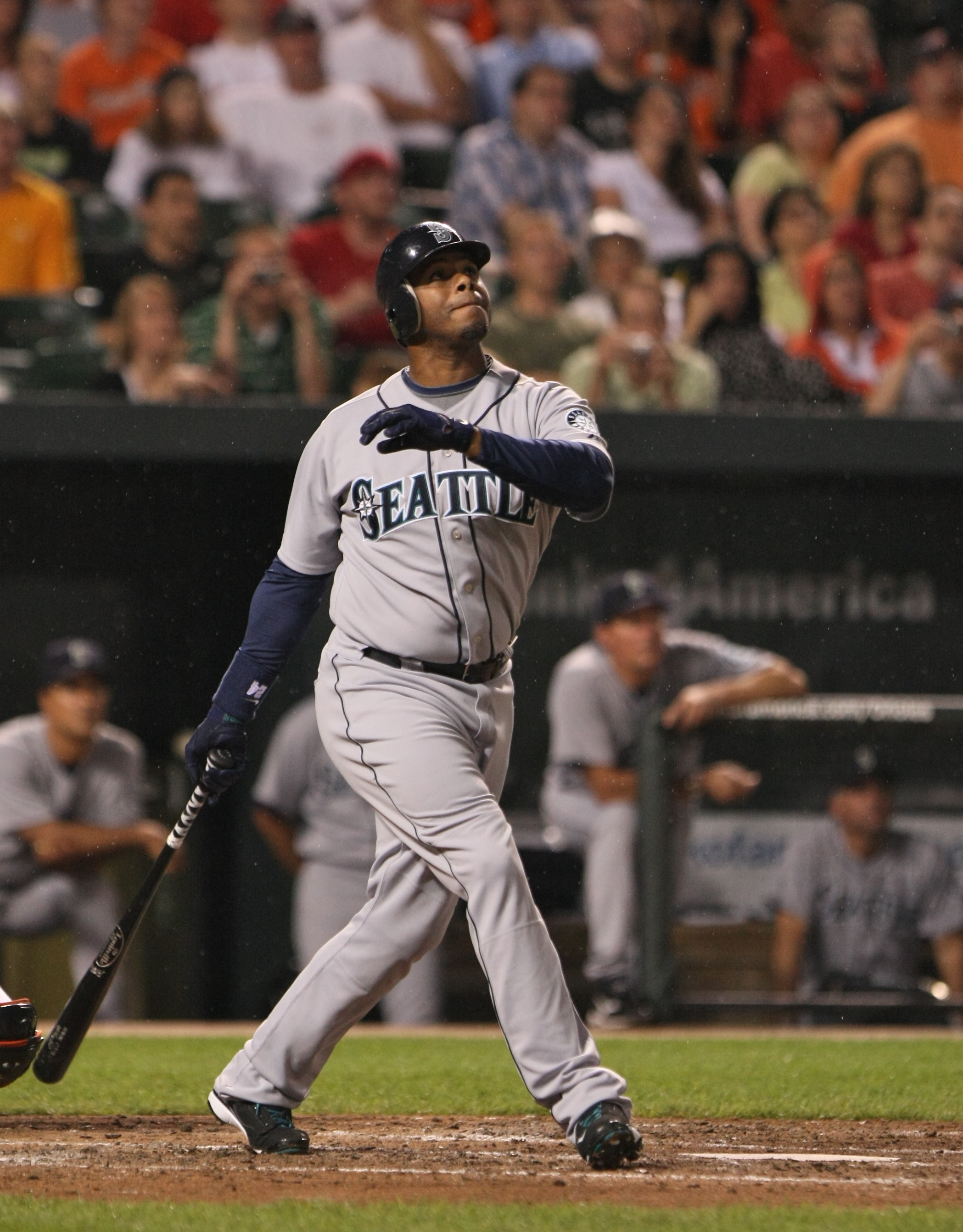
Ken Griffey Jr., the 1987 first overall draft pick

The first-year player draft, also known as the Rule 4 Draft, is the primary mechanism for assigning amateur baseball players from high schools, colleges, and other amateur baseball clubs to Major League Baseball (MLB) teams. Unlike most professional sports, MLB does not permit the trading of draft picks. Since 2023, the first six selections are determined by a lottery; the previous season's standings determine the remaining selections. If two teams have identical records, the team with the worse record in the previous season will receive the higher pick. In addition, teams that lost free agents in the previous off-season may be awarded "compensatory" picks. The first draft took place in 1965; it was introduced to prevent richer teams from negotiating wealthier contracts with top-level prospects and therefore, monopolizing the player market. Originally, three drafts were held each year. The first draft took place in June and involved high-school graduates and college seniors who had just finished their seasons. The second draft took place in January for high school and college players who had graduated in December. The third draft took place in August and was for players who participated in American amateur summer leagues. The August draft was eliminated after two years, and the January draft lasted until 1986.

In 1965, Rick Monday became MLB's first draft pick after being selected by the Kansas City Athletics. Roch Cholowsky is the most recent first overall pick; he was drafted by the Chicago White Sox in 2026. Overall, 23 of the 50 picks before 2015 have participated in the All-Star Game, and four (Bob Horner, Darryl Strawberry, Bryce Harper, and Carlos Correa) have won the Rookie of the Year Award. Twenty-five of the fifty picks before 2015 have been drafted from high schools, one has been drafted out of the Independent American Association, and the others were drafted from universities. To date, Arizona State University, Vanderbilt University, Louisiana State University, and Oregon State University are the only schools from which multiple number-one overall draft picks have been chosen. No first overall pick was inducted into the National Baseball Hall of Fame until 2016, when Ken Griffey Jr. was inducted with a record 99.3 percent of votes cast. Griffey has since been joined by three other top picks: Chipper Jones, inducted in 2018; Harold Baines, elected in December 2018 and inducted in July 2019, and Joe Mauer, inducted in 2024.

In the 60 drafts that have taken place through 2024, 23 of the 30 MLB franchises have had the first pick at least once. The Toronto Blue Jays, St. Louis Cardinals, Los Angeles Dodgers, San Francisco Giants, Cincinnati Reds, Boston Red Sox, and Colorado Rockies have never had the first pick. The Montreal Expos never had the first pick, but the Nationals, their successor, have had it three times. The Athletics have never had the first pick, but the Kansas City Athletics, one of their predecessors, had the first pick in MLB draft history. The Pittsburgh Pirates have had the first overall pick a record six times, while the New York Mets, San Diego Padres, and Houston Astros have each had the first overall pick five times.

== Key ==
‡	Member of the National Baseball Hall of Fame
*	All-Star
^{៛}	Rookie of the Year and All-Star
^{#}	Retired without playing a game in MLB
^{°}	Player did not sign
Italics	Active player

== First overall picks ==
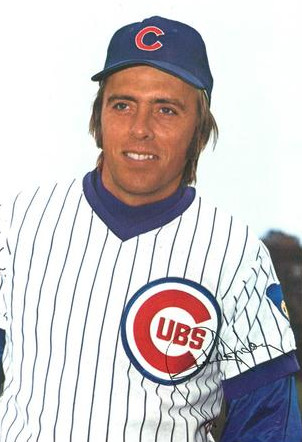
Rick Monday, the 1965 first overall pick

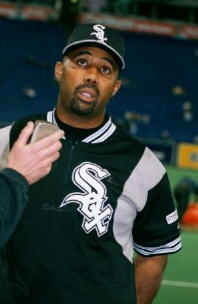
Harold Baines, the 1977 first overall pick

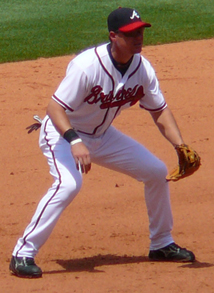
Chipper Jones, the 1990 first overall pick

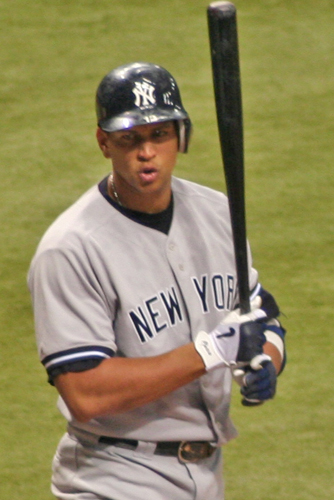
Alex Rodriguez, the 1993 first overall pick

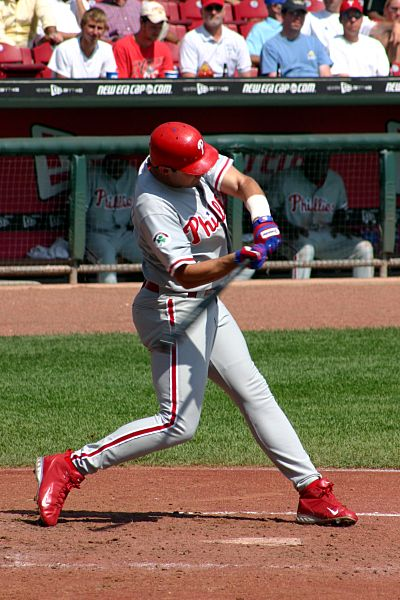
Pat Burrell, the 1998 first overall pick

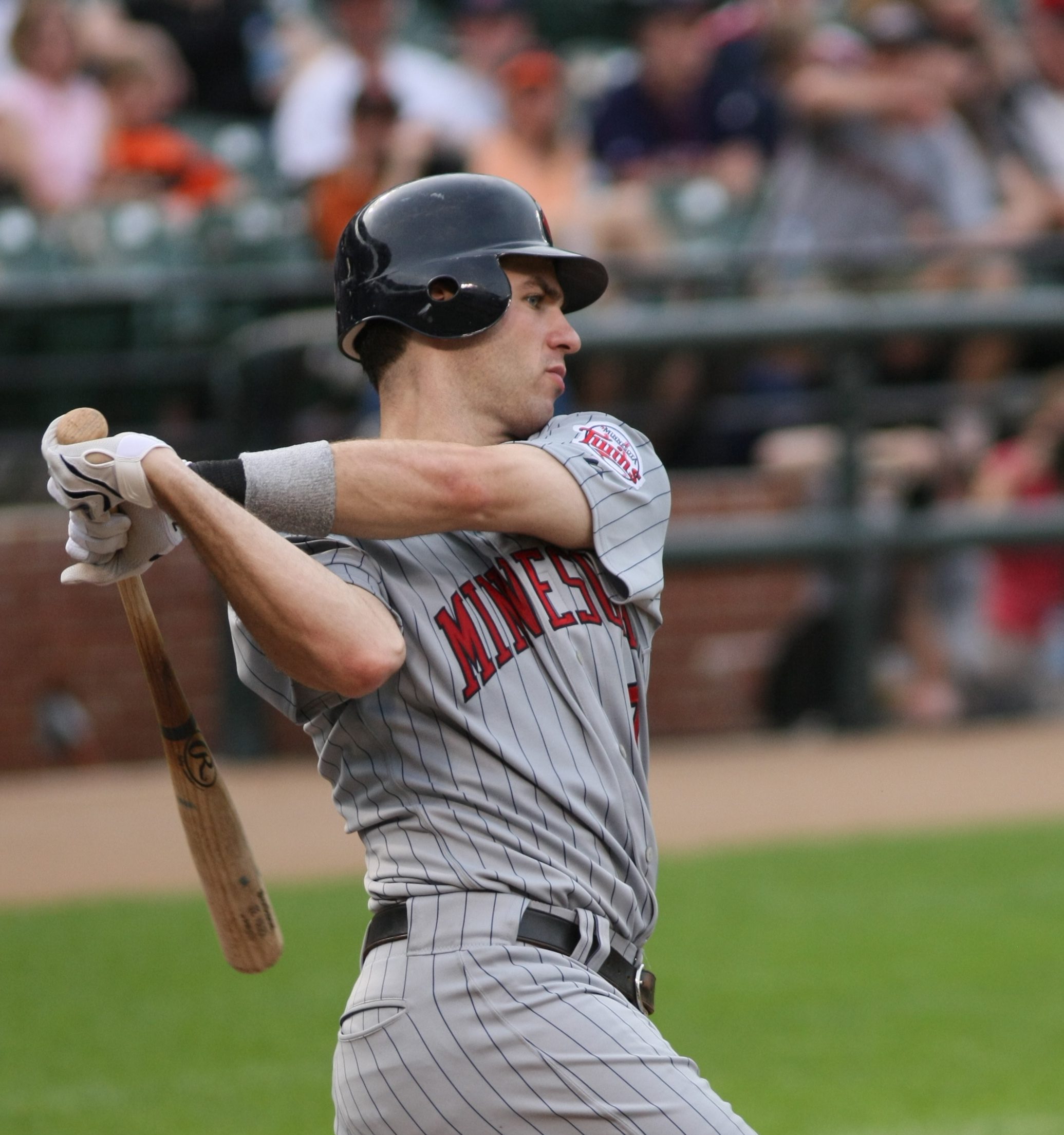
Joe Mauer, the 2001 first overall pick

Year	Player	Team	Position	Club/School
1965	Rick Monday*	Kansas City Athletics	Outfielder	Arizona State University
1966	Steve Chilcott^{#}	New York Mets	Catcher	Antelope Valley High School (Lancaster, California)
1967	Ron Blomberg	New York Yankees	First baseman	Druid Hills High School (Druid Hills, Georgia)
1968	Tim Foli	New York Mets	Shortstop	Notre Dame High School (Sherman Oaks, California)
1969	Jeff Burroughs*	Washington Senators	Outfielder	Woodrow Wilson Classical High School (Long Beach, California)
1970	Mike Ivie	San Diego Padres	Catcher	Walker High School (Atlanta, Georgia)
1971	Danny Goodwin°	Chicago White Sox	Catcher	Peoria High School (Peoria, Illinois)
1972	Dave Roberts	San Diego Padres	Third baseman	University of Oregon
1973	David Clyde	Texas Rangers	Left-handed pitcher	Westchester High School (Houston, Texas)
1974	Bill Almon	San Diego Padres	Shortstop	Brown University
1975	Danny Goodwin ^{[a]}	California Angels	Catcher	Southern University
1976	Floyd Bannister*	Houston Astros	Left-handed pitcher	Arizona State University
1977	Harold Baines^{‡}*	Chicago White Sox	Outfielder	St. Michaels Middle/High School (St. Michaels, Maryland)
1978	Bob Horner^{៛}	Atlanta Braves	Third baseman	Arizona State University
1979	Al Chambers	Seattle Mariners	Outfielder	John Harris High School (Harrisburg, Pennsylvania)
1980	Darryl Strawberry^{៛}	New York Mets	Outfielder	Crenshaw High School (Los Angeles, California)
1981	Mike Moore*	Seattle Mariners	Right-handed pitcher	Oral Roberts University
1982	Shawon Dunston*	Chicago Cubs	Shortstop	Thomas Jefferson High School (Brooklyn, New York)
1983	Tim Belcher°	Minnesota Twins	Right-handed pitcher	Mount Vernon Nazarene University
1984	Shawn Abner	New York Mets	Outfielder	Mechanicsburg Area Senior High School (Mechanicsburg, Pennsylvania)
1985	B.J. Surhoff*	Milwaukee Brewers	Catcher	University of North Carolina
1986	Jeff King	Pittsburgh Pirates	Third baseman	University of Arkansas
1987	Ken Griffey Jr.^{‡}*	Seattle Mariners	Outfielder	Moeller High School (Cincinnati, Ohio)
1988	Andy Benes*	San Diego Padres	Right-handed pitcher	University of Evansville
1989	Ben McDonald	Baltimore Orioles	Right-handed pitcher	Louisiana State University
1990	Chipper Jones^{‡}*	Atlanta Braves	Shortstop	Bolles High School (Jacksonville, Florida)
1991	Brien Taylor^{#}	New York Yankees	Left-handed pitcher	East Carteret High School (Beaufort, North Carolina)
1992	Phil Nevin*	Houston Astros	Third baseman	California State University, Fullerton
1993	Alex Rodriguez*	Seattle Mariners	Shortstop	Westminster Christian High School (Palmetto Bay, Florida)
1994	Paul Wilson	New York Mets	Right-handed pitcher	Florida State University
1995	Darin Erstad*	California Angels	Outfielder	University of Nebraska–Lincoln
1996	Kris Benson	Pittsburgh Pirates	Right-handed pitcher	Clemson University
1997	Matt Anderson	Detroit Tigers	Right-handed pitcher	Rice University
1998	Pat Burrell	Philadelphia Phillies	Outfielder	University of Miami
1999	Josh Hamilton*	Tampa Bay Devil Rays	Outfielder	Athens Drive High School (Raleigh, North Carolina)
2000	Adrián González*	Florida Marlins	First baseman	Eastlake High School (Chula Vista, California)
2001	Joe Mauer^{‡}*	Minnesota Twins	Catcher	Cretin-Derham Hall High School (St. Paul, Minnesota)
2002	Bryan Bullington	Pittsburgh Pirates	Right-handed pitcher	Ball State University
2003	Delmon Young	Tampa Bay Devil Rays	Outfielder	Adolfo Camarillo High School (Camarillo, California)
2004	Matt Bush	San Diego Padres	Shortstop	Mission Bay Senior High School (San Diego, California)
2005	Justin Upton*	Arizona Diamondbacks	Shortstop	Great Bridge High School (Chesapeake, Virginia)
2006	Luke Hochevar	Kansas City Royals	Right-handed pitcher	Fort Worth Cats ^{[b]}
2007	David Price*	Tampa Bay Devil Rays	Left-handed pitcher	Vanderbilt University
2008	Tim Beckham	Tampa Bay Rays	Shortstop	Griffin High School (Griffin, Georgia)
2009	Stephen Strasburg*	Washington Nationals	Right-handed pitcher	San Diego State University
2010	Bryce Harper^{៛}	Washington Nationals	Outfielder/Catcher	College of Southern Nevada
2011	Gerrit Cole*	Pittsburgh Pirates	Right-handed pitcher	University of California, Los Angeles
2012	Carlos Correa^{៛}	Houston Astros	Shortstop	Puerto Rico Baseball Academy and High School
2013	Mark Appel	Houston Astros	Right-handed pitcher	Stanford University
2014	Brady Aiken°^{#}	Houston Astros	Left-handed pitcher	Cathedral Catholic High School (San Diego, California)
2015	Dansby Swanson*	Arizona Diamondbacks	Shortstop	Vanderbilt University
2016	Mickey Moniak	Philadelphia Phillies	Outfielder	La Costa Canyon High School (Carlsbad, California)
2017	Royce Lewis	Minnesota Twins	Shortstop	JSerra Catholic High School (San Juan Capistrano, California)
2018	Casey Mize*	Detroit Tigers	Right-handed pitcher	Auburn University
2019	Adley Rutschman*	Baltimore Orioles	Catcher	Oregon State University
2020	Spencer Torkelson	Detroit Tigers	Third baseman	Arizona State University
2021	Henry Davis	Pittsburgh Pirates	Catcher	University of Louisville
2022	Jackson Holliday	Baltimore Orioles	Shortstop	Stillwater High School (Stillwater, Oklahoma)
2023	Paul Skenes^{៛}	Pittsburgh Pirates	Right-handed pitcher	Louisiana State University
2024	Travis Bazzana	Cleveland Guardians	Second baseman	Oregon State University
2025	Eli Willits	Washington Nationals	Shortstop	Fort Cobb-Broxton High School (Fort Cobb, Oklahoma)
2026	Roch Cholowsky	Chicago White Sox	Shortstop	University of California, Los Angeles

== By franchise ==
Franchise	Total picks	Most recent year
Arizona Diamondbacks	2	2015
Atlanta Braves	2	1990
Baltimore Orioles	3	2022
Boston Red Sox	0	—
Chicago Cubs	1	1982
Chicago White Sox	3	2026
Cincinnati Reds	0	—
Cleveland Guardians	1	2024
Colorado Rockies	0	—
Detroit Tigers	3	2020
Houston Astros	5	2014
Kansas City Royals	1	2006
Los Angeles Dodgers	0	—
Los Angeles Angels	2	1995
Miami Marlins	1	2000
Milwaukee Brewers	1	1985
Minnesota Twins	3	2017
New York Mets	5	1994
New York Yankees	2	1991
Oakland Athletics	1	1965
Philadelphia Phillies	2	2016
Pittsburgh Pirates	6	2023
San Diego Padres	5	2004
San Francisco Giants	0	—
Seattle Mariners	4	1993
St. Louis Cardinals	0	—
Tampa Bay Rays	4	2008
Texas Rangers	2	1973
Toronto Blue Jays	0	—
Washington Nationals	3	2025

== Footnotes ==
^{a} Goodwin chose to attend university instead of signing with the Chicago White Sox, and re-entered the draft once he graduated in 1975.
^{b} Hochevar played college baseball for the University of Tennessee, and was originally drafted by the Los Angeles Dodgers in 2005, but did not agree to a contract. He re-entered the draft in 2006 after spending the previous year with the independent Fort Worth Cats.

== See also ==
- List of first overall NBA draft picks
- List of first overall National Football League draft picks
- List of first overall NHL draft picks
