= 2010 Connecticut Huskies football team =

American college football season

2010 Connecticut Huskies football
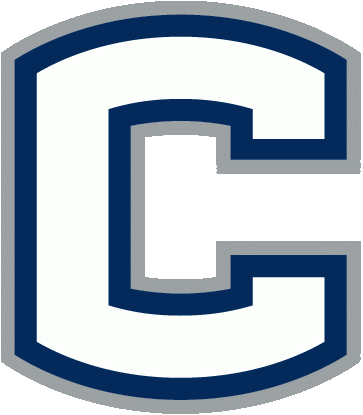

Big East co-champion Lambert-Meadowlands Trophy

Fiesta Bowl, L 20–48 vs. Oklahoma
- Conference: Big East Conference
- Record: 8–5 (5–2 Big East)
- Head coach: Randy Edsall (12th season)
- Offensive coordinator: Joe Moorhead (2nd season)
- Offensive scheme: Spread
- Defensive coordinator: Todd Orlando (6th season)
- Base defense: 3–4
- Home stadium: Rentschler Field

2010 Big East Conference football standings
| | Conf. | | | Overall |
| Team | W | | L | W | | L |
|---|---|---|---|---|---|---|
| Connecticut $+ | 5 | – | 2 | 8 | – | 5 |
| West Virginia + | 5 | – | 2 | 9 | – | 4 |
| Pittsburgh + | 5 | – | 2 | 8 | – | 5 |
| Syracuse | 4 | – | 3 | 8 | – | 5 |
| South Florida | 3 | – | 4 | 8 | – | 5 |
| Louisville | 3 | – | 4 | 7 | – | 6 |
| Cincinnati | 2 | – | 5 | 4 | – | 8 |
| Rutgers | 1 | – | 6 | 4 | – | 8 |
$ – BCS representative as conference champion; + – Conference co-champions; Rankings from AP Poll

The 2010 Connecticut Huskies football team represented the University of Connecticut as a member of the Big East Conference during the 2010 NCAA Division I FBS football season. Led by Randy Edsall in his 12th and final season of his first stint as head coach, the Huskies compiled an overall record of 8–5 with a mark of 5–2 in conference play, sharing the Big East title with Pittsburgh and West Virginia. Due to victories against the other two co-champions, Connecticut earned the Big East's automatic bid to a Bowl Championship Series (BCS) game. The Huskies were invited to the Fiesta Bowl, where they lost to Big 12 Conference champion Oklahoma. It was the first major bowl appearance in the program's 115-year history. The team played home games at Rentschler Field in East Hartford, Connecticut.

== Schedule ==
| Date | Time | Opponent | Rank | Site | TV | Result | Attendance | Source |
|---|---|---|---|---|---|---|---|---|
| September 4 | 3:30 pm | at Michigan* | | Michigan Stadium; Ann Arbor, Michigan | ABC, ESPN2 | L 10–30 | 113,090 | |
| September 11 | 12:00 pm | Texas Southern* | | Rentschler Field; East Hartford, CT | BEN | W 62–3 | 37,359 | |
| September 18 | 12:00 pm | at Temple* | | Lincoln Financial Field; Philadelphia, PA | BEN | L 16–30 | 18,702 | |
| September 25 | 12:00 pm | Buffalo* | | Rentschler Field; East Hartford, CT | BEN | W 45–21 | 36,738 | |
| October 2 | 12:00 pm | Vanderbilt*^{†} | | Rentschler Field; East Hartford, CT | BEN | W 40–21 | 40,000 | |
| October 8 | 7:30 pm | at Rutgers | | Rutgers Stadium; Piscataway, New Jersey | ESPN | L 24–27 | 48,431 | |
| October 23 | 3:30 pm | at Louisville | | Papa John's Cardinal Stadium; Louisville, KY | ESPNU | L 0–26 | 48,591 | |
| October 29 | 8:00 pm | West Virginia | | Rentschler Field; East Hartford, CT | ESPN2 | W 16–13 ^{OT} | 40,000 | |
| November 11 | 7:30 pm | Pittsburgh | | Rentschler Field; East Hartford, CT | ESPN | W 30–28 | 35,391 | |
| November 20 | 7:00 pm | at Syracuse | | Carrier Dome; Syracuse, NY (rivalry) | ESPNU | W 23–6 | 41,46 | 5 |
| November 27 | 12:00 pm | Cincinnati | | Rentschler Field; East Hartford, CT | BEN | W 38–17 | 40,000 | |
| December 4 | 8:00 pm | at South Florida | | Raymond James Stadium; Tampa, FL | ESPN2 | W 19–16 | 41,809 | |
| January 1, 2011 | 8:30 pm | vs. No. 9 Oklahoma* | No. 25 | University of Phoenix Stadium; Glendale, AZ (Fiesta Bowl) | ESPN | L 20–48 | 67,232 | |
*Non-conference game; ^{†}Homecoming; Rankings from AP Poll released prior to the game; All times are in Eastern time

== Before the season ==
=== Coaching changes ===
Connecticut lost two assistant coaches in January, when the tight ends coach, Dave McMichael left to accept the same position at West Virginia, and defensive backs coach, Scott Lakatos, left for the same position at Georgia.

On February 4, UConn announced that Jon Wholley would return to the coaching staff as the tight ends coach, and Darrell Perkins would assume the defensive backs coaching position.

=== Roster changes ===
The Huskies lost eight starters from the 2009 team to graduation. Among them, Marcus Easley and Robert McClain were drafted into the NFL. In addition to the graduation losses, quarterback Casey Turner, and offensive linemen Scott Schultz and Zac Zielinski, all backups, transferred out of UConn. On July 1, Randy Edsall announced that safety, Marcus Aiken had been dismissed from the University for academic reasons, and that wide receiver, Malik Generett was ineligible for the 2010 season, also for academic reasons. Generett remained enrolled at the university and could practice with the team, but is not able to play in games.

On July 9, former USC fullback, D.J. Shoemate announced that he was transferring to UConn from the scandal-plagued Trojan program, which earned a two-year postseason ban. Due to an NCAA ruling that states any USC junior or senior can transfer without sitting out for a year, Shoemate was eligible to play in 2010.

=== Recruiting ===
On February 3, 2010, Randy Edsall announced that 20 student-athletes had signed a National Letter of Intent to attend Connecticut. Four; Jonathan Louis, Greg McKee, Andrew Opoku and Gilbert St. Louis; entered school in January to participate in spring practice. In addition to the 20 high school student athletes, two members from the 2009 recruiting class; Leon Kinnard and Michael Osiecki, also enrolled in school in January.

College recruiting (2010)
| Name | Hometown | School | Height | Weight | 40^{‡} | Commit date |
|---|---|---|---|---|---|---|
| Josh Alexander; DE | Waldorf, Maryland | Westlake HS | 6 ft 3 in (1.91 m) | 200 lb (91 kg) | 4.6 | Jan 8, 2010 |
| Josh Alexander; DE | Recruit ratings: Scout: Rivals: | | | | | |
| Ty-Meer Brown; ATH | McKeesport, Pennsylvania | McKeesport HS | 6 ft 1 in (1.85 m) | 180 lb (82 kg) | 4.5 | Jan 7, 2010 |
| Ty-Meer Brown; ATH | Recruit ratings: Scout: Rivals: | | | | | |
| Gus Cruz; OL | Meriden, New Hampshire | Kimball Union Academy | 6 ft 3 1/2 in (1.92 m) | 265 lb (120 kg) | -- | Aug 1, 2009 |
| Gus Cruz; OL | Recruit ratings: Scout: Rivals: | | | | | |
| Geremy Davis; WR | Norcross, Georgia | Norcross HS | 6 ft 1 1/2 in (1.87 m) | 191 lb (87 kg) | 4.6 | Dec 17, 2009 |
| Geremy Davis; WR | Recruit ratings: Scout: Rivals: | | | | | |
| Reuben Frank; FB | Poughkeepsie, New York | Poughkeepsie HS | 6 ft 2 in (1.88 m) | 230 lb (100 kg) | 4.7 | Jul 2, 2009 |
| Reuben Frank; FB | Recruit ratings: Scout: Rivals: | | | | | |
| Mark Hansson; OL | Palm Harbor, Florida | Palm Harbor University HS | 6 ft 6 in (1.98 m) | 260 lb (120 kg) | 5.0 | Jan 23, 2010 |
| Mark Hansson; OL | Recruit ratings: Scout: Rivals: | | | | | |
| Byron Jones; WR | Bristol, Connecticut | St. Paul Catholic HS | 6 ft 0 in (1.83 m) | 175 lb (79 kg) | 4.6 | Jun 29, 2009 |
| Byron Jones; WR | Recruit ratings: Scout: Rivals: | | | | | |
| Tebucky Jones, Jr; WR | New Britain, Connecticut | Net Britain HS | 6 ft 1 in (1.85 m) | 179 lb (81 kg) | 4.5 | Aug 7, 2009 |
| Tebucky Jones, Jr; WR | Recruit ratings: Scout: Rivals: | | | | | |
| Jonathan Louis; DE | Kingston, Pennsylvania | Wyoming Seminary Upper School | 6 ft 5 in (1.96 m) | 240 lb (110 kg) | -- | Dec 20, 2009 |
| Jonathan Louis; DE | Recruit ratings: Scout: Rivals: | | | | | |
| Taylor Mack; DB | Atlanta, Georgia | Lovett School | 5 ft 9 in (1.75 m) | 161 1/2 lb (73.3 kg) | 4.6 | Dec 20, 2009 |
| Taylor Mack; DB | Recruit ratings: Scout: Rivals: | | | | | |
| Joel Kosinski; LB | Beaver Falls, Pennsylvania | Beaver Falls Area SHS | 6 ft 5 in (1.96 m) | 250 lb (110 kg) | 4.8 | Jan 29, 2010 |
| Joel Kosinski; LB | Recruit ratings: Scout: Rivals: | | | | | |
| Lyle McCombs; RB | Staten Island, New York | St. Joseph By The Sea HS | 5 ft 8 in (1.73 m) | 180 lb (82 kg) | -- | Nov 16, 2009 |
| Lyle McCombs; RB | Recruit ratings: Scout: Rivals: | | | | | |
| Scott McCummings; QB | Milford, Massachusetts | Milford HS | 6 ft 2 in (1.88 m) | 213 lb (97 kg) | 4.7 | Aug 17, 2009 |
| Scott McCummings; QB | Recruit ratings: Scout: Rivals: | | | | | |
| Gregory McKee; OL | Chicago, Illinois | King College Prep | 6 ft 7 in (2.01 m) | 290 lb (130 kg) | -- | Jan 8, 2010 |
| Gregory McKee; OL | Recruit ratings: Scout: Rivals: | | | | | |
| Andrew Opoku; DB | Fork Union, Virginia | Fork Union Military Academy | 6 ft 4 in (1.93 m) | 209 1/2 lb (95.0 kg) | -- | Nov 26, 2009 |
| Andrew Opoku; DB | Recruit ratings: Scout: Rivals: | | | | | |
| Bryan Paull; OL | Parkland, Florida | Stoneman Douglas HS | 6 ft 4 in (1.93 m) | 290 lb (130 kg) | 5.2 | Dec 13, 2009 |
| Bryan Paull; OL | Recruit ratings: Scout: Rivals: | | | | | |
| Angelo Pruitt; DE | Cincinnati, Ohio | North College Hill HS | 6 ft 3 in (1.91 m) | 275 lb (125 kg) | -- | Dec 20, 2009 |
| Angelo Pruitt; DE | Recruit ratings: Scout: Rivals: | | | | | |
| Yawin Smallwood; LB | Worcester, Massachusetts | Doherty Memorial HS | 6 ft 4 in (1.93 m) | 225 lb (102 kg) | 4.6 | Jul 1, 2009 |
| Yawin Smallwood; LB | Recruit ratings: Scout: Rivals: | | | | | |
| Gilbert St. Louis; DB | Plantation, Florida | Plantation HS | 5 ft 10 in (1.78 m) | 175 lb (79 kg) | 4.5 | Oct 4, 2009 |
| Gilbert St. Louis; DB | Recruit ratings: Scout: Rivals: | | | | | |
| Brandon Steg; LB | Coral Springs, Florida | Taravella HS | 6 ft 3 in (1.91 m) | 224 lb (102 kg) | -- | Jul 30, 2009 |
| Brandon Steg; LB | Recruit ratings: Scout: Rivals: | | | | | |
Overall recruit ranking: Scout: 69 Rivals: 83
‡ Refers to 40-yard dash; Note: In many cases, Scout, Rivals, 247Sports, On3, and ESPN may conflict in their listings of height, weight and 40 time.; In these cases, the average was taken. ESPN grades are on a 100-point scale.; Sources: "UConn College Football Recruiting Commits". Scout.; "Scout.com Team Recruiting Rankings". Scout.; "2010 Team Ranking". Rivals.com.

=== Awards watchlists ===
The players listed below have been named to the following preseason award watch lists.

Johnny Unitas Golden Arm Award:

- Zach Frazer

Lombardi Award:

- Lawrence Wilson

Outland Trophy:

- Zach Hurd

Rimington Trophy:

- Moe Petrus

Bednarik Award:

- Lawrence Wilson

Maxwell Award:

- Jordan Todman

Butkus Award:

- Greg Lloyd
- Scott Lutrus
- Lawrence Wilson

John Mackey Award:

- Ryan Griffin

Doak Walker Award:

- Jordan Todman

== Game summaries ==
=== Michigan ===
| Team | 1 | 2 | 3 | 4 | Total |
|---|---|---|---|---|---|
| Huskies | 0 | 10 | 0 | 0 | 10 |
| • Wolverines | 14 | 7 | 3 | 6 | 30 |

- Date: September 4
- Location: Michigan Stadium
  Ann Arbor, Michigan
- Game start: 3:30 p.m. EST
- Elapsed time: 3:15
- Game attendance: 113,090
- Game weather: 57 °F (14 °C), Overcast
- Referee: A. Kemp
- TV announcers (ABC/ESPN2): Sean McDonough, Matt Millen, & Holly Rowe

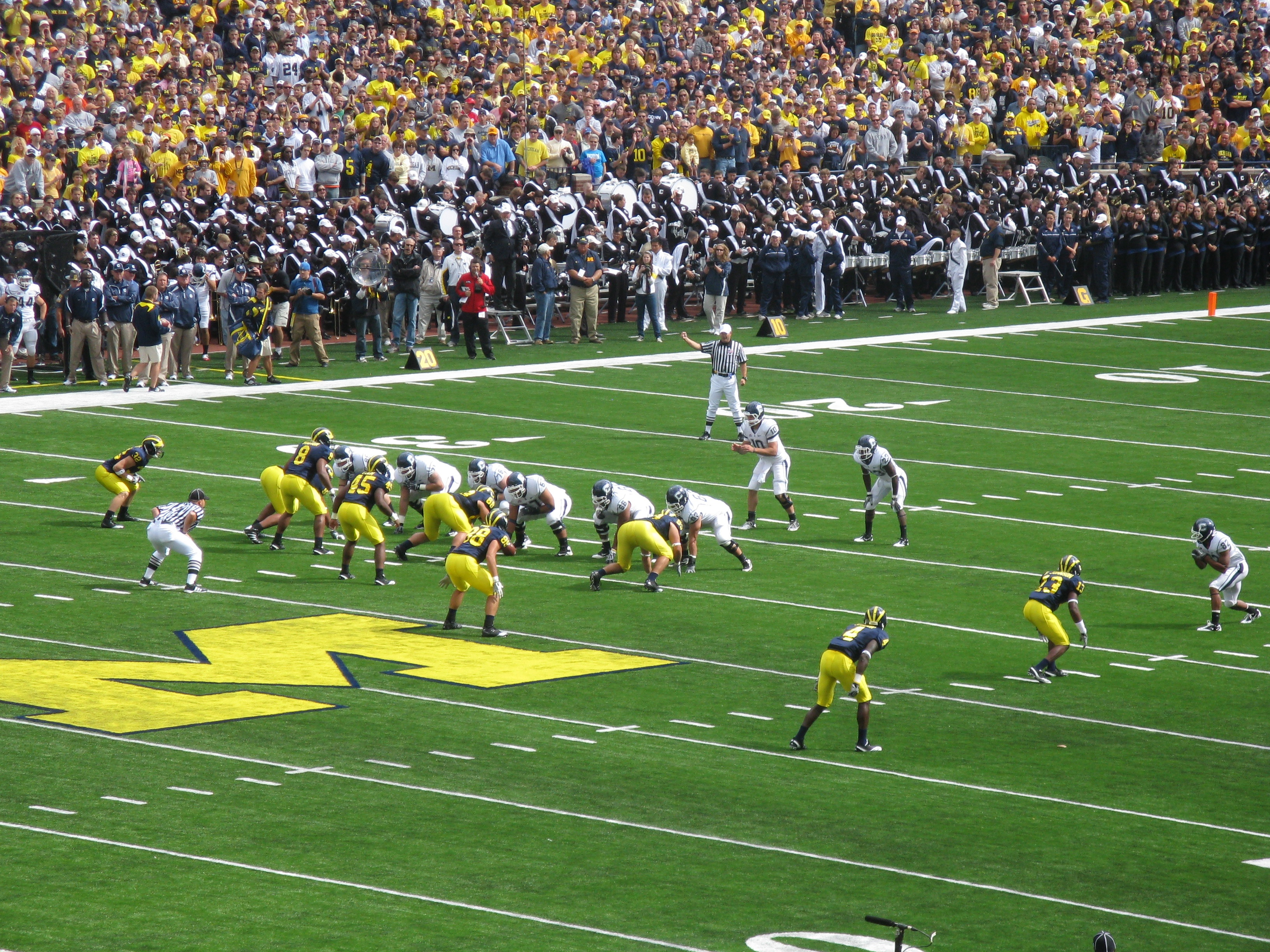
at Michigan Stadium vs. the 2010 Michigan Wolverines football team

Recap: Connecticut opened the season on the road against the Michigan Wolverines in the first meeting between the two schools. Total attendance for the game was 113,090 at Michigan Stadium. This was the largest crowd ever to attend a college football game.

The first quarter was all Michigan. First a 12-yard touchdown run by Vincent Smith. A few minutes later came a 32-yard TD run by quarterback Denard Robinson. Michigan started the second quarter with another touchdown, this time with a 3-yard run by Michael Shaw. The only scoring by Connecticut came in the second quarter: first a 32-yard field goal by Dave Teggert, and later a 2-yard run by Jordan Todman. In the third quarter Michigan's only points was a 24-yard field goal by Brendan Gibbons. In the fourth quarter Michigan's Vincent Smith ran in another touchdown, this time from 11 yards out. The extra point attempt was no good, however. Robinson ran for 197 yards, setting a school record for a quarterback.

=== Texas Southern ===
| Team | 1 | 2 | 3 | 4 | Total |
|---|---|---|---|---|---|
| Tigers | 0 | 0 | 0 | 3 | 3 |
| • Huskies | 24 | 21 | 10 | 7 | 62 |

- Date: September 11
- Location: Rentschler Field
  East Hartford, Connecticut
- Game start: 12:00 p.m. EST
- Elapsed time: 3:02
- Game attendance: 37,359
- Game weather: 72 °F (22 °C), Sunny
- Referee: Jeff Maconaghy
- TV announcers (Big East Network): Bob Picozzi & Jay Taylor

Recap: Jordan Todman rushed for 151 yards on 15 carries and 3 touchdowns, all in the first half, as Connecticut dominated an overmatched Texas Southern team, 62–3. Robbie Frey also eclipsed the 100-yard rushing mark with 101 yards on 12 carries and 2 touchdowns. It was the first time the Huskies produced two 100-yard rushers in the same game since November 21, 2009 against Notre Dame. The 59 point margin of victory tied the largest for UConn in their FBS era. The 62 points scored is a Rentschler Field record, and the second most tallied in UConn's FBS years.

After the victory, game balls were awarded to Jordan Todman (offense), Lawrence Wilson (defense) and Anthony Sherman (special teams).

=== Temple ===
| Team | 1 | 2 | 3 | 4 | Total |
|---|---|---|---|---|---|
| Huskies | 3 | 3 | 10 | 0 | 16 |
| • Owls | 0 | 7 | 7 | 16 | 30 |

- Date: September 18
- Location: Lincoln Financial Field
  Philadelphia
- Game start: 12:00 p.m. EST
- Elapsed time: 3:29
- Game attendance: 18,702
- Game weather: 70 °F (21 °C), Sunny
- Referee: John McDaid
- TV announcers (Big East Network): Michael Reghi & Doug Graber

Recap: Jordan Todman rushed for a career-high 192 yards, but had a costly fourth-quarter fumble that led to Temple's go-ahead touchdown as the Huskies lost to the Owls 30–16. Bernard Pierce ran for 179 yards and scored three touchdowns to lead the Owls to their first victory over Connecticut since 2002.

Despite outgaining Temple by over 100 yards in the first half, UConn could only muster two field goals, and trailed at halftime, 7–6. Todman scored the Huskies only touchdown on the opening series of the second half, when he ran 63 yards for the score. Temple answered with a touchdown scoring of their own, when Pierce scored from one yard out. David Teggart gave the lead back to the Huskies, with a 47-yard field goal late in the third quarter.

With a 16–14 lead, Todman, who earlier briefly left the game with an injured elbow, was stripped by Adrian Robinson while fighting for extra yards. Robinson returned the fumble for a touchdown. After a Huskies three-and-out series, Temple's Delano Green returned the ensuing punt to the Huskies two-yard line. Pierce later scored his third touchdown. The Owls added a late field goal to make the final score 30–16.

After the game, Todman was named to the Big East Conference's weekly honor roll.

=== Buffalo ===
| Team | 1 | 2 | 3 | 4 | Total |
|---|---|---|---|---|---|
| Bulls | 0 | 14 | 7 | 0 | 21 |
| • Huskies | 14 | 0 | 17 | 14 | 45 |

- Date: September 26
- Location: Rentschler Field
  East Hartford, Connecticut
- Game start: 12:00 p.m. EST
- Elapsed time: 3:36
- Game attendance: 36,738
- Game weather: 80 °F (27 °C), overcast
- Referee: Stan Evans
- TV announcers (Big East Network): Mike Gleason, John Congemi, & Eamon McAnaney

Recap: Connecticut returned home to face the University at Buffalo Bulls. It was the first time the teams met since the 2009 International Bowl. The Huskies started the scoring early when Jerome Junior intercepted a pass by Bulls quarterback Jerry Davis for a touchdown. D.J. Shoemate, who started for the injured Jordan Todman, would later add a first-quarter touchdown and a 14–0 UConn lead. Buffalo responded by scoring two touchdowns in the second quarter, both on passes from Davis to Ed Young, and the score was tied 14–14 at halftime.

Cody Endres, in his first game back from suspension, replaced UConn's starting quarterback, Zach Frazer, in the second half, and led the Huskies to two quick scores, including a 56-yard touchdown pass to Michael Smith. Robbie Frey, who replaced Shoemate late in the first half, added a touchdown, and finished with 112 rushing yards on 13 carries. Endres threw a second touchdown pass and finished with 139 passing yards while completing 7 of his 11 passing attempts. Blidi Wreh-Wilson completed the scoring for Connecticut when he returned an intercepted pass 46 yards for a touchdown.

Sio Moore, who was making his first career start, had 16 tackles and an interception, and was named the Big East Defensive Player of the Week. Robbie Frey was also named to the weekly honor roll.

Game balls: Robbie Frey (offense), Jerome Junior (defense) and Anthony Sherman (special teams)

=== Vanderbilt ===
| Team | 1 | 2 | 3 | 4 | Total |
|---|---|---|---|---|---|
| Commodores | 0 | 21 | 0 | 0 | 21 |
| • Huskies | 7 | 14 | 10 | 9 | 40 |

- Date: October 2
- Location: Rentschler Field
  East Hartford, Connecticut
- Game start: 12:00 p.m. EST
- Elapsed time: 3:16
- Game attendance: 40,000
- Game weather: 60 °F (16 °C), Sunny
- Referee: Steve Shaw
- TV announcers (Big East Network): Mike Gleason, John Congemi, & Eamon McAnaney

Recap: Jordan Todman rushed for 190 yards and scored 2 touchdowns as Connecticut defeated Vanderbilt, 40–21. Both of Todman's touchdowns were in the first half when the Huskies took a 14–0 lead. Vanderbilt scored game's next three touchdowns, all in the span of 3 minutes and 38 seconds to take a 21–14 lead late in the first half. Cody Endres, making his first start of the year, threw a touchdown pass to Kashif Moore to tie the game at 21 going into halftime.

The Huskies took the lead when they scored on the opening drive of the second half with a touchdown pass from Endres to Corey Manning. It was Manning's first reception and touchdown of his career. UConn would add a field goal and a defensive touchdown from Blidi Wreh-Wilson later in the second half. Wreh-Wilson's interception return for a touchdown was his second in as many weeks. Late in the game, Vanderbilt snapped the ball through the end zone for a safety to make the final score, 40–21. It was Connecticut's second win ever against an opponent from the SEC.

Wreh-Wilson, who also recovered a fumble in addition to his interception and touchdown, was named the Big East's Defensive Player of the Week. Todman was named to the weekly honor roll.

=== Rutgers ===
| Team | 1 | 2 | 3 | 4 | Total |
|---|---|---|---|---|---|
| Huskies | 7 | 17 | 0 | 0 | 24 |
| • Scarlet Knights | 14 | 3 | 0 | 10 | 27 |

- Date: October 8
- Location: Rutgers Stadium
  Piscataway, New Jersey
- Game start: 7:30 p.m. EST
- Elapsed time: 3:33
- Game attendance: 48,431
- Game weather: 68 °F (20 °C), Clear
- Referee: Dan Hennigan
- TV announcers (ESPN): Brad Nessler & Rod Gilmore

Recap: Chas Dodd threw for 322 yards and led Rutgers to 10 fourth quarter points as the Scarlet Knights defeated UConn, 27–24. The Huskies led by 7 with less than 4 minutes remaining in the game when Dodd completed a 52-yard touchdown pass to Jeremy Deering to tie the game. San San Te later kicked the game-winning field goal with 13 seconds left in the game.

Jordan Todman led the Huskies with 123 yards rushing, including a 66-yard touchdown run in the second quarter. The run was a career long for Todman. Quarterback Cody Endres made his second consecutive start, and threw for 153 yards and a touchdown. Nick Williams scored his first career touchdown when he returned a kickoff 100 yards for a touchdown.

=== Louisville ===
| Team | 1 | 2 | 3 | 4 | Total |
|---|---|---|---|---|---|
| Huskies | 0 | 0 | 0 | 0 | 0 |
| • Cardinals | 0 | 13 | 10 | 3 | 26 |

- Date: October 23
- Location: Papa John's Cardinal Stadium
  Louisville, Kentucky
- Game start: 3:30 p.m. EST
- Elapsed time: 2:44
- Game attendance: 48,591
- Game weather: 79 °F (26 °C), Cloudy
- Referee: Tom Tomczyk
- TV announcers (ESPNU): Pam Ward & Danny Kanell

Recap: The Huskies travelled to Louisville after their first bye week of the season to play the Cardinals. During the week off, two starters were lost from the team when offensive guard, Erik Kuraczea withdrew from the university, and quarterback, Cody Endres was suspended for the remainder of the season. Head coach Randy Edsall later announced that Endres would not return to the team for his senior season in 2011. Endres's suspension meant that freshman, Mike Box would make his first career start. He would only complete 4 of 12 passes for 35 yards, and would eventually leave the game with a concussion.

Louisville scored 13 points in each half and was led by Bilal Powell, who had 105 yards rushing. They earned two touchdowns, one on a pass from Adam Froman to Cameron in the first quarter, and the second on a 75-yard punt return from Doug Beaumont. Kicker Chris Philpott added 4 field goals. The Huskies were led by 80 rushing yards from Jordan Todman. Their only venture into the red zone resulted in a missed field goal by Dave Teggart. It was the first time UConn was shut out since November 2005, when they lost at Pittsburgh, 24–0.

=== West Virginia ===
| Team | 1 | 2 | 3 | 4 | OT | Total |
|---|---|---|---|---|---|---|
| Mountaineers | 10 | 0 | 3 | 0 | 0 | 13 |
| • Huskies | 0 | 3 | 7 | 3 | 3 | 16 |

- Date: October 29
- Location: Rentschler Field
  East Hartford, Connecticut
- Game start: 8:00 p.m. EST
- Elapsed time: 3:18
- Game attendance: 40,000
- Game weather: 48 °F (9 °C), Brisk
- Referee: Jerry McGinn
- TV announcers (ESPN2): Joe Tessitore & Rod Gilmore

Recap: Jordan Todman had a career-high 33 carries for 113 yards and a touchdown as UConn earned its first victory ever over West Virginia. Despite being outgained, 414−278, the Huskies were beneficiaries of 4 Mountaineer lost fumbles, including one by Ryan Clarke in overtime.

West Virginia scored first when wide receiver Brad Starks took an end-around handoff 53 yards for a touchdown just under 5 minutes into the game. Kicker Tyler Bitancurt added a 43-yard field goal to make the score 10−0 at the end of the first quarter. The Huskies did not gain a first down until the second quarter, and punted on each of their first 6 possessions. However, Zach Frazer, who started in place of an injured Mike Box, led them on a 12-play, 63-yard drive, culminating with a 39-yard field goal from Dave Teggart to end the first half. It was the first point that they had scored in nearly 8 quarters.<

West Virginia opened the second half with a drive to UConn's 26-yard line, before they were stopped on fourth down. Todman scored on a 24-yard run on the ensuing drive, making the score 10−10. Tyler Bitancurt added a 42-yard field goal to give the Mountaineers a 13−10 lead at the end of the third quarter. Following a Huskies punt, West Virginia drove into UConn territory when Sio Moore forced Geno Smith to fumble. Lawrence Wilson recovered the ball for UConn. The next play after the turnover, Frazer completed a 40-yard pass to Kashif Moore to put the ball at the West Virginia 15-yard line. Teggart later kicked a 26-yard field goal to tie the score at 13. The score remained 13−13 until the end of regulation.

In overtime, UConn won the coin toss and elected to play defense on the first possession. West Virginia moved the ball to the one-yard line when Clarke fumbled and Wilson recovered for the Huskies. With the Mountaineers failing to score a point on their possession, the Huskies would only need to kick a field goal to win the game. UConn took the ball at West Virginia's 25-yard line, and Todman ran 4 times for 16 yards before Teggart kicked the game winning 27-yard field goal.

In the week following the game, UConn swept the Big East weekly honors when Jordan Todman was named the Big East Offensive Player of the Week, Sio Moore won the Defensive award, and Dave Teggart, the Special Teams honoree. Moore, who had 17 tackles, forced 2 fumbles and recovered 2 fumbles, was also awarded the Walter Camp Defensive Player of the Week.

=== Pittsburgh ===
| Team | 1 | 2 | 3 | 4 | Total |
|---|---|---|---|---|---|
| Panthers | 7 | 0 | 14 | 7 | 28 |
| • Huskies | 7 | 3 | 10 | 10 | 30 |

- Date: November 11
- Location: Rentschler Field
  East Hartford, Connecticut
- Game start: 7:30 p.m. EST
- Elapsed time: 3:08
- Game attendance: 35,391
- Game weather: 42 °F (6 °C), Clear and cold
- Referee: Thomas Tomczyk
- TV announcers (ESPN): Rece Davis, Craig James, Jesse Palmer, and Jenn Brown

Recap: Jordan Todman set new career highs with 222 yards rushing on 37 carries as the Huskies defeated Pittsburgh 30–28. Zach Frazer made his second consecutive start and completed 9 of 20 passes for 100 yards. He threw an interception on the first play of the game, and Pittsburgh responded with a 4-yard touchdown run by Dion Lewis. UConn scored on the ensuing drive on a 36-yard pass from Frazer to Kashif Moore to tie the game at 7. Dave Teggart added 2 field goals to give the Huskies a 13–7 lead in the third quarter. Later in the third quarter, Pittsburgh was able to get its offense going when Tino Sunseri completed a 42-yard pass to Jon Baldwin. The Panthers scored on the drive with a one-yard run from Lewis. After a Connecticut punt, Pitt extended its lead to 21–13 on a Ray Graham touchdown run. Nick Williams returned the ensuing kickoff 95 yards for a touchdown to make the score 21–20 at the end of the third quarter. It was Williams' second kick-off return for a touchdown of the year.

After trading punts to begin the fourth quarter, the Huskies took a 23–21 lead on a 25-yard field goal from Teggart. Robbie Frey recovered a Graham fumble on the following kick-off for the Huskies. Two plays later, Frazer threw a 14-yard touchdown pass to Isiah Moore to extend the lead to 30–21. Pitt scored on their next possession when they went 70 yards in only 1 minute and 50 seconds on a 20-yard touchdown catch by Baldwin. UConn got the ball back at their ten-yard line and 4:29 left in the game. With 2:50 left in the game, and the ball on their own 19-yard line, the Huskies faced a fourth down with one yard to gain. Instead of punting the ball back to Pitt, they handed the ball to Todman, who gained 4 yards and the first down. If they had failed to get the first down, Pittsburgh would have been given the ball within range to kick a go-ahead field goal. Todman gained 41 yards on the final drive, and the Huskies ran the remaining time off the clock to give them a 30–28 victory.

Lawrence Wilson had 11 tackles and a sack, and was named the Big East's Defensive Player of the Week. Todman was also named to the weekly honor roll.

=== Syracuse ===
| Team | 1 | 2 | 3 | 4 | Total |
|---|---|---|---|---|---|
| • Huskies | 7 | 3 | 7 | 6 | 23 |
| Orange | 3 | 0 | 3 | 0 | 6 |

- Date: November 20
- Location: Carrier Dome
  Syracuse, New York
- Game start: 7:00 p.m. EST
- Elapsed time: 3:16
- Game attendance: 41,465
- Game weather: N/A (Indoor stadium)
- Referee: Jeff Maconaghy
- TV announcers (ESPNU): Clay Matvick & Herm Edwards

Recap: Connecticut then travelled to upstate New York to take on the Syracuse Orange. Coming into the game, the Huskies had defeated the Orange on 3 straight occasions. Syracuse entered the game with a victory over Rutgers which made the Orange bowl-eligible for the first time since 2004. Although refuted by coach, Doug Marrone, there were some in the Syracuse organization who felt that UConn had run up the score on the Orange the previous year, possibly adding motivation to the game. A win for the Huskies would make them bowl eligible for the fourth consecutive season, while a loss would eliminate them from a chance to win the Big East Conference.

Connecticut scored a touchdown on their first possession of the game on a one-yard run by Jordan Todman. Syracuse responded on the next drive with a 42-yard field goal from Ross Krautman to make the score 7–3. Later in the first half, following a Huskies interception by Kendall Reyes, Dave Teggart kicked a 35-yard field goal to make the score at half-time, 10–3.

Syracuse scored first in the second half with a second field goal from Krautman. Connecticut went three and out on the next drive and punted the ball back to Syracuse. After a couple of short runs by Delone Carter, Reyes sacked quarterback Ryan Nassib on the Orange 8-yard line, forcing him to fumble. UConn's Trevardo Williams recovered the fumble at the 4-yard line. Todman scored a touchdown on the following play to extend the Huskies lead to 17–6. Teggart added two fourth-quarter field goals to make the final score 23–6.

Todman finished the game with 130 rushing yards to go with his two touchdowns. Both he and Reyes were named to the Big East Conference's weekly honor roll.

After the victory, game balls were given to Todman on offense, Reyes on defense and Cole Wagner for special teams.<

=== Cincinnati ===
| Team | 1 | 2 | 3 | 4 | Total |
|---|---|---|---|---|---|
| Bearcats | 3 | 7 | 0 | 7 | 17 |
| • Huskies | 7 | 17 | 0 | 14 | 38 |

- Date: November 27
- Location: Rentschler Field
  East Hartford, Connecticut
- Game start: 12:00 p.m. EST
- Elapsed time: 3:25
- Game attendance: 40,000
- Game weather: 42 °F (6 °C), Sunny and Brisk
- Referee: Patrick Garvey
- TV announcers (Big East Network): Mike Gleason, John Congemi, & Eamon McAnaney

Recap: Connecticut returned home to Rentschler Field to honor the graduating seniors and to play the Cincinnati Bearcats. The previous day, West Virginia defeated Pittsburgh, meaning UConn would win the Big East conference with wins in their last two games of the season.

The Huskies opened the scoring when Zach Frazer threw a 16-yard touchdown pass to Anthony Sherman. It was the first career touchdown for Sherman, who, as a senior, was playing in his last home game. Cincinnati's Jacob Rogers kicked a field goal to make the score 7–3 at the end of the first quarter. UConn extended their lead to 14–3 on a Robbie Frey touchdown, which followed a fumble by Cincinnati running back, Isiah Pead. The Bearcats responded with a 78-yard drive that ended with a touchdown catch by Armon Binns. Following a Dave Teggart field goal to make the score 17–10, the Bearcats drove into the Huskies red zone with less than 2 minutes remaining in the first half. A touchdown would have tied the score at halftime, however, for the second consecutive week, Kendall Reyes intercepted a deflected pass. This time, he returned it for an apparent touchdown. The score was called back due to an illegal block in the back penalty against UConn's Lawrence Wilson. The Huskies kept possession, and were given the ball at Cincinnati's 15-yard line. Five plays later, Jordan Todman scored a touchdown to make the score at halftime 24–10.

After a scoreless third quarter, Cincinnati scored a touchdown on a run by Zach Collaros to make the score 24–17. Robbie Frey returned the ensuing kickoff to the Cincinnati 36-yard line. Five plays later, Todman scored his second touchdown to extend the lead to 31–17. Collaros threw an interception to Blidi Wreh-Wilson on the next possession, and Wreh-Wilson returned it to the Bearcats 14-yard line. Todman added his third touchdown to make the final score 38–17. In all, the Huskies intercepted four Collaros passes.

Todman rushed for 175 yards and three touchdowns, and was named the Big East Player of the Week for the second time. Kendall Reyes was also named to the weekly honor roll.

=== South Florida ===
| Team | 1 | 2 | 3 | 4 | Total |
|---|---|---|---|---|---|
| • Huskies | 3 | 7 | 3 | 6 | 19 |
| Bulls | 3 | 0 | 3 | 10 | 16 |

- Date: December 4
- Location: Raymond James Stadium
  Tampa, Florida
- Game start: 8:00 p.m. EST
- Elapsed time: 3:10
- Game attendance: 41,809
- Game weather: 60 °F (16 °C), Clear
- Referee: Jerry McGinn
- TV announcers (ESPN2): Mark Jones, Bob Davie, & Quint Kessenich

Recap: The Huskies travelled to Tampa to conclude the regular season to take on the South Florida Bulls. With a victory, they would share the Big East title with West Virginia and Pittsburgh, and due to victories over each, would claim the conference's BCS bowl bid.

South Florida opened the scoring with a 42-yard field goal from Maikon Bonani on their first possession of the game. UConn tied the game on their next possession with a 40-yard field goal from Dave Teggart. The teams traded punts for most of the remainder of the first half until South Florida's Jon Legiste intercepted a Zach Frazer pass at the Bulls seven-yard line. Legiste returned the interception to the South Florida 49-yard line. On the next play, Bulls quarterback Bobby Eveld, who was making his first career start in place of an injured B.J. Daniels, was intercepted by UConn linebacker Lawrence Wilson. Wilson, who caught the ball off of a deflection, returned the interception for a touchdown and giving the Huskies a 10–3 lead at halftime.

The teams traded field goals in the third quarter to make the score 13–6 going into the fourth quarter. Teggart opened the fourth quarter with a 50-yard field goal to give UConn a 16–6 lead. The field goal was the longest of his career to that point. Later in the quarter, South Florida recovered a Jordan Todman fumble at the Huskies 30-yard line. Two plays later, Eveld threw a 28-yard touchdown pass to Dontavia Bogan to cut the Huskies' lead to 16–13. Later in the fourth quarter, the Bulls drove the field to the Huskies 5-yard line with under 2 minutes in the game. They were unable to score a touchdown, but Bonani kicked his third field goal of the game to tie the game at 16 with 1:16 remaining in the fourth quarter. Robbie Frey returned the following kickoff to the Huskies 40-yard line. Zach Frazer then threw completions to Kashif Moore and Michael Smith to set up Teggart to kick the game winning 52-yard field goal with only 17 seconds left in the game. A last second hail mary pass by the Bulls was knocked down, giving the Huskies a 19–16 victory.

With the victory, Connecticut clinched a spot in a BCS bowl game. The following day, it was announced that they would play in the 2011 Fiesta Bowl against the Big 12 champion Oklahoma Sooners.

Dave Teggart, who successfully made 4 field goals in 4 attempts, including 2 of over 50 yards, was named the Big East Conference's Special Teams Player of the Week. Linebacker Lawrence Wilson was also named to the weekly honor roll.

=== Oklahoma–Fiesta Bowl ===
2011 Fiesta Bowl

| Team | 1 | 2 | 3 | 4 | Total |
|---|---|---|---|---|---|
| Huskies | 0 | 10 | 10 | 0 | 20 |
| • No. 7 Sooners | 14 | 6 | 14 | 14 | 48 |

- Date: January 1
- Location: University of Phoenix Stadium
  Glendale, Arizona
- Game start: 8:30 p.m. EST
- Elapsed time: 3:34
- Game attendance: 67,232
- Game weather: N/A (Indoor Stadium)
- Referee: Jay Stricherz
- TV announcers (ESPN/ESPN 3D/ESPN Radio): Sean McDonough, Matt Millen, & Heather Cox/Joe Tessitore, Tim Brown, & Ray Bentley/Dave LaMont, Ed Cunningham, & Jeannine Edwards

== Roster ==
2010 Connecticut Huskies roster
| **Quarterbacks**: 4 Michael Box, RS Fr; 10 Zach Frazer, RS Sr; 11 Scott McCummings, (redshirt) Fr; 12 Cody Endres, RS Jr; 17 Blaise Driscoll, (redshirt) Fr; 18 Johnny McEntee, RS So; **Tailbacks**: 22 Kelmetrus Wylie, RS Jr; 23 Jordan Todman, Jr; 24 D.J. Shoemate, Jr; 42 Jordan Huxtable, Fr; 43 Lyle McCombs, (redshirt) Fr; 44 Robbie Frey, RS Jr; 45 Martin Hyppolite, RS Fr; **Fullbacks**: 39 Bret Manning, Sr; 47 Reuben Frank, (redshirt) Fr; 49 **Anthony Sherman**, Sr; **Wide receivers**: 1 Dwayne Difton, So; 14 Leon Kinnard, Fr; 31 Nick Williams, So; 80 Michael Smith, Jr; 82 Kashif Moore, RS Jr; 83 Isiah Moore, RS Jr; 84 Tebucky Jones, (redshirt) Fr; 85 Geremy Davis, (injured) (redshirt) Fr; 86 Nasir Abudu, (redshirt) Fr; 88 Gerrard Sheppard, RS So; 89 Brandon Banks, So; **Tight ends**: 9 Andrew Opoku, (redshirt) Fr; 81 Corey Manning, RS So; 89 John Delahunt, RS So; 90 Alex Kaiser, Sr; 93 Derek Chard, Sr; 94 Ryan Griffin, RS So | **Offensive linemen**: 50 Tyler Bullock, RS Fr; 57 Muhammed Petrus, Jr; 60 Erik Kuraczea, RS So; 61 Stephen Brown, RS Fr; 62 Ben Chapman, RS So; 63 Adam Masters, RS So; 64 Teddy Baker, (redshirt) Fr; 65 Gus Cruz, (redshirt) Fr; 66 Matthieu Olivier, RS Sr; 68 Bryan Paull, (redshirt) Fr; 69 Steve Greene, RS Fr; 70 Gary Bardzak, RS Jr; 71 Mike Ryan, RS Jr; 72 Jimmy Bennett, RS So; 76 Mark Hansson, (redshirt) Fr; 77 Kevin Friend, RS Fr; 78 **Zach Hurd**, RS Sr; 79 Greg McKee, (redshirt) Fr; **Defensive linemen**: 4 Twyon Martin, RS Jr; 26 Marcus Campbell, (injured) Jr; 48 Trevardo Williams, So; 51 Tim Willman, RS Fr; 52 Patrick Wilson, (redshirt) Fr; 53 Ryan Wirth, RS So; 54 Alex Polito, RS Sr; 56 Angelo Pruitt, (redshirt) Fr; 58 Jonathan Louis, (redshirt) Fr; 59 Shamar Stephen, RS Fr; 91 Jesse Joseph, So; 96 A.J. Portee, RS So; 97 B.J. McBryde, (redshirt) Fr; 98 Ted Jennings, RS So; 99 **Kendall Reyes**, RS Jr | **Linebackers**: 8 Lawrence Wilson, RS Sr; 28 Jory Johnson, RS So; 28 Emmanuel Omokaro, RS Jr; 30 Matt Edwards, RS So; 32 **Scott Lutrus**, RS Sr; 33 Yawin Smallwood, (injured) (redshirt) Fr; 34 David Kenney, RS Fr; 36 Michael Osiecki, (redshirt) Fr; 37 Jonathan Jean-Louis, RS Jr; 39 Mark Hinkley, RS So; 41 Brandon Steg, (redshirt) Fr; 46 Sio Moore, RS So; 55 Jerome Williams, RS So; 95 Greg Lloyd, Sr; **Defensive backs**: 2 Gilbert Stlouis, Fr; 5 Blidi Wreh-Wilson, RS So; 7 Mike Lang, So; 15 Jerome Junior, RS So; 16 Byron Jones, (redshirt) Fr; 19 Kijuan Dabney, RS Jr; 20 Tevrin Brandon, RS Fr; 21 Gary Wilburn, RS Jr; 24 Dwayne Gratz, RS So; 25 Harris Agbor, RS Jr; 29 Taylor Mack, Fr; 35 Chris Lopes, RS Fr; 38 Alex Kantor, (redshirt) Fr; 40 Ty-Meer Brown, (redshirt) Fr; 40 John Yurek, RS Jr; **Kickers**: 13 Chad Christen **P**, RS Fr; 38 David Teggart **K**, RS Jr; 86 Joel Kosinski, **P**, RS Fr | **Coaching staff**: Randy Edsall, Head coach; Hank Hughes, Assistant head coach for defense/defensive line; Joe Moorhead, Offensive coordinator/quarterbacks; Todd Orlando, Defensive coordinator/inside linebackers; Matt Cersosimo, Wide receivers/recruiting coordinator; Mike Foley, Offensive line; Lyndon Johnson, Outside linebackers/special teams coordinator; Darrell Perkins, Defensive backs; Terry Richardson, Running backs; Jon Wholley, Tight ends; Andrew Breiner, Offensive graduate assistant; Shane Fogerty, Defensive graduate assistant; Tim Pendergast, Directory of football operations; Andy Baylock, Director of UConn football alumni/community affairs; Classes Key: Fr – Freshman; first year player. So – Sophomore; second year player. Jr – Junior; third year player. Sr – Senior; fourth year player. **Bold** – Team captain. Italics – Left team during the season. RS – Previously used a redshirt. – Redshirt during 2010 season. – Injured for entire or majority of season and is eligible for a medical redshirt. Roster |

== After the season ==
On January 2, reports surfaced that head coach Randy Edsall did not accompany the team on the chartered flight from Phoenix back to Hartford, instead flying to Baltimore to interview for the vacant Maryland head coaching position. Later that day, Maryland issued a press release stating that they had hired Edsall to replace Ralph Friedgen as head coach.

=== NFL draft ===
Shortly after the completion of the Fiesta Bowl, Jordan Todman announced that he would forgo his senior season and enter the 2011 NFL draft. The following Huskies were selected in the NFL draft following the season

| Round | Pick | Player | Position | NFL team |
|---|---|---|---|---|
| 5 | 136 | Anthony Sherman | Fullback | Arizona Cardinals |
| 6 | 166 | Lawrence Wilson | Linebacker | Carolina Panthers |
| 6 | 183 | Jordan Todman | Running back | San Diego Chargers |
| 7 | 237 | Greg Lloyd | Linebacker | Philadelphia Eagles |
