= Mike Edwards (third baseman) =

American baseball player (born 1976)

- Third baseman / Left fielder
- Born: November 24, 1976 (age 49); Goshen, New York, U.S.
- Batted: Right Threw: Right

MLB debut
- September 20, 2003, for the Oakland Athletics

Last MLB appearance
- July 1, 2006, for the Pittsburgh Pirates

MLB statistics
- Batting average: .243
- Home runs: 3
- Runs batted in: 15
- Stats at Baseball Reference

Teams
- Oakland Athletics (2003); Los Angeles Dodgers (2005); Pittsburgh Pirates (2006)

Michael Donald Edwards (born November 24, 1976) is an American former Major League Baseball utility player.

Edwards attended high school at Mechanicsburg Area Senior High in Mechanicsburg, Pennsylvania. He holds the MASH records for assists, walks, and saves and is second place in home runs, doubles, RBI, and hits, all to 1984 #1 pick Shawn Abner. Mike was a three-sport athlete at Mechanicsburg, and led the Wildcats to their first District Basketball Title. Mike's number 7 is currently retired for baseball by the school. Drafted by the Cleveland Indians in the 9th round of the 1995 MLB amateur draft, Edwards made his Major League Baseball debut with the Oakland Athletics on September 20, 2003. He played for most of 2006 with the Pittsburgh Pirates' Triple-A affiliate, the Indianapolis Indians. After the season, he was removed outright from the 40-man roster, and chose to accept free agency. Edwards graduated from CSUEB and majored in Industrial Engineering alongside Cesar Lafarga. Mike now lives outside of San Francisco with his wife and two kids.
