= 2011 Fiesta Bowl =

2011 Tostitos Fiesta Bowl
- BCS Bowl Game; 40th Fiesta Bowl
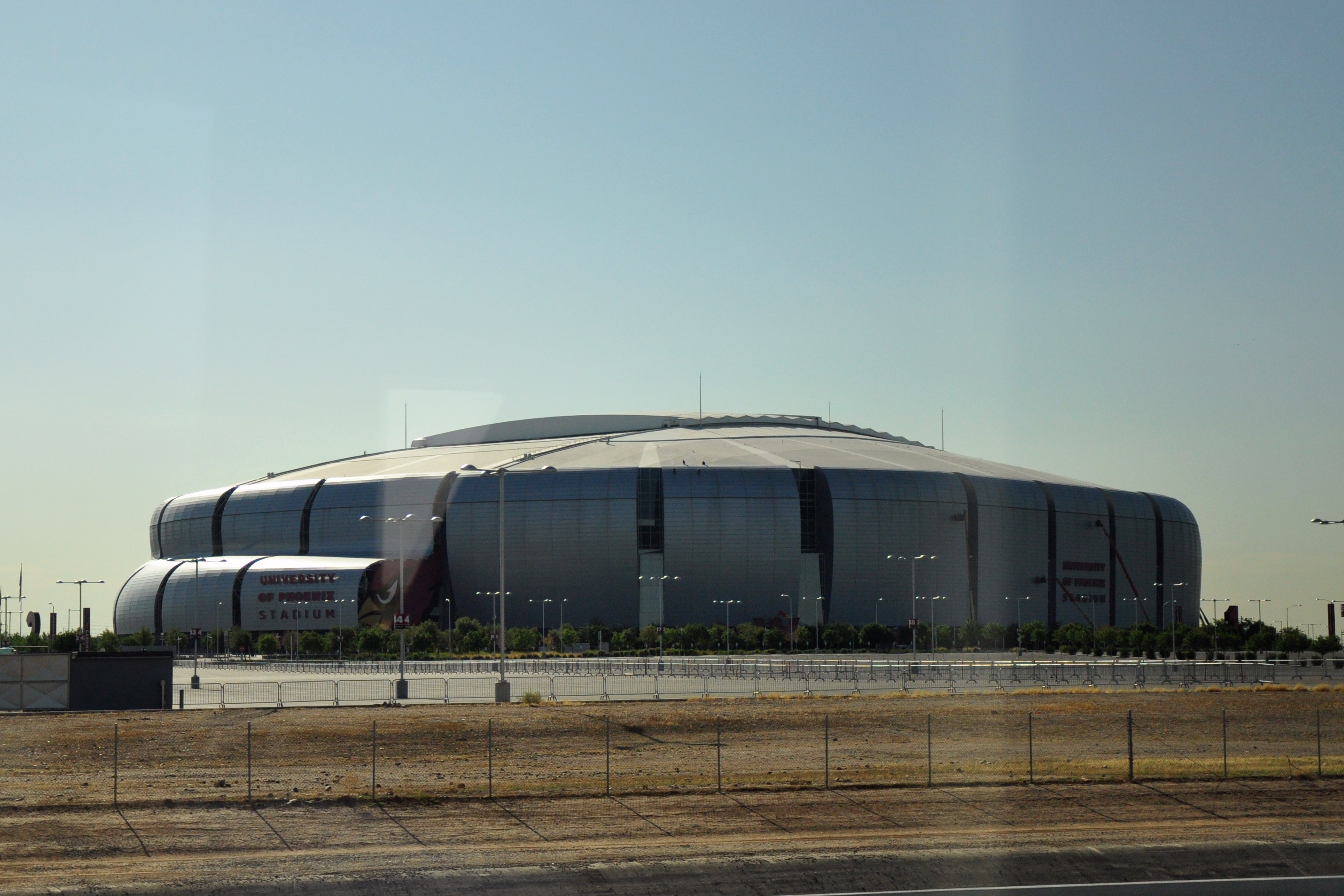
- University of Phoenix Stadium in Glendale, Arizona, hosted the Fiesta Bowl.
Connecticut Huskies	Oklahoma Sooners
(8–4)	(11–2)
Big East	Big 12
20	48
Head coach: Randy Edsall	Head coach: Bob Stoops
AP / Coaches / BCS; 25 / NR / NR	AP / Coaches / BCS; 9 / T-8 / 7
	1	2	3	4	Total
Connecticut	0	10	10	0	20
Oklahoma	14	6	14	14	48
- Date: January 1, 2011
- Season: 2010
- Stadium: University of Phoenix Stadium
- Location: Glendale, Arizona
- MVP: Offensive: Landry Jones; Defensive: Jamell Fleming
- Favorite: Oklahoma by 17
- National anthem: U.S Military Glee Club
- Referee: Jay Stricherz (Pac-10 Conference)
- Attendance: 67,232
- Payout: US$17 million

United States TV coverage
- Network: ESPN
- Announcers: Sean McDonough, Matt Millen and Heather Cox
- Nielsen ratings: 6.7 (10.8 million)

The 2011 Tostitos Fiesta Bowl was a postseason college football bowl game between the Connecticut Huskies (UConn), co-champions of the Big East Conference, and the Oklahoma Sooners, champions of the Big 12 Conference, at University of Phoenix Stadium in Glendale, Arizona, on January 1, 2011. The game, part of the 2011 Bowl Championship Series and the 40th contest in Fiesta Bowl history, was the final game of the 2010 NCAA Division I-Football Bowl Subdivision (Division I-FBS) football season (Note: In August 2006 the NCAA changed the name of Division I-A to Football Bowl Subdivision (FBS) and Division I-AA to Football Championship Subdivision (FCS). In this article the old names are used when referring to events before August 2006; the new names are used when referring to events after August 2006.) for both teams. It ended in a 48–20 victory for Oklahoma.

Oklahoma was selected to participate in the Fiesta Bowl after an 11–2 regular season that culminated with a 23–20 win over Nebraska in the 2010 Big 12 Championship Game. Facing the Sooners were the Connecticut Huskies with a regular season record of 8–4; they earned the Big East's BCS berth by defeating fellow co-champions Pittsburgh and West Virginia in consecutive regular season games. Pregame coverage focused on Oklahoma's struggles in past BCS games dating back to the 2004 Sugar Bowl as well as Connecticut's difficulties in selling their designated ticket allotment from the Fiesta Bowl.

The Sooners scored on their first two possessions and held a 14–0 lead at the end of the first quarter. The Huskies responded with an interception return for a touchdown early in the second quarter; after an exchange of field goals the halftime score was 20–10 in favor of Oklahoma. In the second half, Oklahoma pulled away with multiple passing and interception-return touchdowns. While Connecticut responded with a 95-yard kickoff return for a touchdown, they failed to score a touchdown on offense at any point during the game.

Oklahoma quarterback Landry Jones was named the game's most valuable player on offense; defensive back Jamell Fleming was named the defensive most valuable player. Jones had a school bowl record of 429 passing yards; he completed three passes for touchdowns. Within 24 hours following the game Connecticut suffered two notable defections: running back Jordan Todman announced that he was leaving school early to enter the 2011 NFL draft and head coach Randy Edsall was hired as the new head coach at the University of Maryland. In the wake of the 2011 contest, the Fiesta Bowl released an internal report stating that several members illegally gave campaign contributions and were reimbursed for it.

== Team selection ==
The Fiesta Bowl was one of five Bowl Championship Series (BCS) bowl games that plays at the conclusion of the college football season. As defined by contract, the bowl matches up the champion of the Big 12 Conference against an at-large pick. On December 4, 2010, the Oklahoma Sooners defeated the Nebraska Cornhuskers 23–20 in the 2010 Big 12 Championship Game to earn the automatic bid to the 2011 Fiesta Bowl.

The at-large spot in the Fiesta Bowl was filled via a round-robin selection procedure defined by the other Bowl Championship series games and the automatic bids. The order of at-large selections rotates annually among the BCS bowls. In 2011, the Sugar Bowl picked first, followed by the Orange Bowl, then the Fiesta Bowl. Uniquely in 2011, the Rose Bowl was obligated to choose a non-automatic qualifier in place of the Pac-10 Champion, Oregon. The Sugar Bowl picked Ohio State, while the Orange Bowl selected Stanford. The Fiesta Bowl was thus left to select Big East Conference champion Connecticut.

=== Connecticut ===
The Huskies entered the 2010 season having gone 8–5 in 2009 culminating with a win at the PapaJohns.com Bowl against South Carolina. At the start of the season, Connecticut was picked to finish fourth in the Big East in a media poll with eight starters returning on offense and seven on defense.

The Huskies started the season with a 30–10 loss to Michigan at Ann Arbor. The Huskies returned home and won handily over Texas Southern with a score of 62–3. However, they lost to their next opponent, Temple, by the score of 30–16. Wins over Buffalo and Vanderbilt closed out their non-conference schedule.

At the start of conference play, the Huskies’ record was 3–2. They suffered a close 27–24 loss to Rutgers and a 26–0 shutout loss to Louisville. Returning home, they won an overtime 16–13 match against West Virginia. The Huskies also beat conference favorite Pittsburgh 30–28. The Huskies also won on the road at Syracuse by the score of 23–6. Returning home, they defeated Cincinnati. In their final conference game, the Huskies were able to win a close game 19–16 at South Florida. By winning at South Florida, they won a share of the Big East title with West Virginia and Pittsburgh. Victories over both opponents give Connecticut the conference BCS berth.

This was Connecticut's first Fiesta Bowl appearance, as well as its only BCS bowl.

=== Oklahoma ===
Oklahoma entered the season coming off a disappointing 8–5 season with a Sun Bowl victory against Stanford. At the start of the season, Oklahoma was picked to win the Big 12 South in the preseason media poll as well as being ranked in the #7 in the AP Poll and #8 in the Coaches Poll.

Oklahoma kicked off its season with a win over Utah State. For their next game, the Sooners played host to #17 Florida State, which they won 47–17. Oklahoma had a narrow victory 27–24 win over Air Force. The Sooners' first road game came against Cincinnati, which was also a narrow victory of 31–29.

Oklahoma's first conference game was against rival #21 Texas at the Red River Rivalry in Dallas, which the Sooners won 28–20. Oklahoma then won easily against Iowa State and lost at #11 Missouri, 36–27. Oklahoma won against Colorado, but faced another road loss to Texas A&M. After the loss, the Sooners were able to defeat Texas Tech and Baylor handily before Bedlam at Oklahoma State. Oklahoma defeated Oklahoma State by the score of 47–41 to earn a three-way share of the division title. Since Oklahoma held the higher BCS rank, they were the one to face Nebraska in the Big 12 Championship game.

Oklahoma beat #13 Nebraska in the Big 12 Championship game by the score of 23–20 to win the conference's BCS bid.

== Pregame buildup ==
A majority of the discussion of the before the Fiesta Bowl was about the matchups and the disparity between the two teams. There was also talk of Oklahoma's past Fiesta Bowl woes including past losses to Boise State and West Virginia. Also, there was some discussion of how many unsold tickets there were from each school, especially from Connecticut fans, many of whom would have to travel cross country, and the fact the university may have to absorb the debt from any tickets that they do not sell.

=== Offensive matchups ===
Connecticut's offense was primarily led by Jordan Todman. He had rushed for a total of 1,574 yard prior to the Fiesta Bowl. Todman had averaged 27 carries per game with an average of 5.3 yards per attempt as well averaged 143.1 yards per game.

Connecticut's pass offense was ranked 112th out of 120 teams in the country. Quarterback Zach Frazer had only one 200 yard game in 2010 and had only completed 52.7 percent of his 222 passes for 1,202 yards. For the season, Frazier had five touchdowns.

The Sooners offense was led by Landry Jones. He had completed a school record of 371 completions for 4,289 yards. Jones was also third in the nation with 35 touchdown passes. DeMarco Murray was Oklahoma's all-time leader in all purpose yards with 6,626 yards and 64 touchdowns. For the 2010 season, he had over 1,900 combined yards and scored 19 touchdowns. In receiving, sophomore Ryan Broyles had a school record of 118 receptions gaining 1,452 yards as well as scoring 13 touchdowns.

Oklahoma's offense ran 1,131 plays in the 2010 season, averaged 87 per game, which were 200 more than the next closest team. Oklahoma was fourth in the nation in passing with 336.8 yards per game, 13th in total offense with 478.1 yards per game, and was 17th in scored with 36.4 points per game.

=== Defensive matchups ===
In the last five games before the Fiesta Bowl, Connecticut had intercepted ten passes and recovered seven fumbles. In that span, they had allowed fewer than 20 points, in addition to having a plus 12 turnover ratio. The Huskies defense was ranked 16th in the nation in pass efficiency defense.

Oklahoma was ranked 58th in total defense coming into the Fiesta Bowl. Oklahoma allowed 151.8 yards per rushing per game and was ranked 63rd in the nation.

The Sooners had several stand out players on defense, one being defensive end Jeremy Beal. Beal was the first player in school history to earn 200 yards in lost sacks. In 2010, he had eight and a half sacks and 18 tackles for loss.

== Game summary ==
The 2011 Fiesta Bowl kicked off on January 1, 2011, at 8:30 p.m. ET. The game was nationally televised on ESPN, with a television rating of 6.7 for the broadcast. 67,232 people attended the game in person.

=== First quarter ===
Oklahoma won the coin toss and elected to defer possession until the start of the second half. The Huskies returned the kickoff to their 19-yard line where they started their possession. Connecticut's first possession consisted of three rushing plays for a total gain of 9 yards. Connecticut was forced to punt. Oklahoma started their first possession from their own 30-yard line. The Sooners completed several passes and running plays for a 9 plays, 70-yard drive ending with an 8-yard passing touchdown from Landry Jones to James Hanna.

When Connecticut regained possession after the post-touchdown kickoff, they were able to move down the field for a 15-play, 55-yard drive which included a 14-yard pass to Ryan Griffin and 11-yard pass to Kashif Moore. On the 19-yard line on 4th down with one yard to go, Randy Edsall decided to run for the down instead of kicking for a field goal, which was stopped for no gain.

Oklahoma took over on downs from their 19-yard line. After a 12-yard pass to Cameron Kenney and three rushing gains from DeMarco Murray, the Sooners were already at midfield. On the seventh play Jones passed to Ryan Broyles for a 39-yard gain to end up on the Connecticut 6-yard line. Two plays later, DeMarco Murray rushed for a 3-yard touchdown.

At the end of the first quarter, Oklahoma led Connecticut by the score of 14–0.

=== Second quarter ===
At the start of the second quarter, Connecticut had possession of the ball however they were unable to gain any yards and went three and out and was forced to punt. When Oklahoma regained possession on third down, Landry Jones was intercepted by Dwayne Gratz at Oklahoma's 46-yard line which was returned for a touchdown. The interception touchdown cut Oklahoma's lead to 14–7.

The Sooners gained possession at their own 20-yard line. On the third play Jones completed a 35-yard pass to Broyles to bring them to the Connecticut's 39-yard line. Two plays later Jones competed a pass to Stills, which was fumbled and recovered by Oklahoma. After a four-yard rushing loss to Connecticut 27-yard line, Oklahoma converted a 41-yard field goal.

On Connecticut's next possession, the Huskies were forced to punt after a 6-play, 11-yard drive stalled at their 40-yard line after a costly Substitution Infraction penalty on the offense on third down and four. Punting the ball back to the Sooners, Oklahoma was able to move the ball on a series of short passes and DeMarco Murray runs to drive 67 yards to the Huskies 8-yard line. Unable to connect on third and goal pass, the drive ended with a 24-yard field goal to extend the lead to 20–7.

The Huskies received good field position at their own 44-yard line with a 34-yard kickoff return by Nick Williams. On second down, Jordan Todman rushed for 19 yards to the Oklahoma 37-yard line. Then Zach Frazer, completed a 12 pass to Isiah Moore to reach the Oklahoma 25-yard line. An additional one-yard rush and four-yard pass brought the Huskies to the Oklahoma 20. Unable to convert on third down, they scored a 37-yard field goal.

At halftime, Oklahoma led Connecticut 20–10.

=== Third quarter ===
Oklahoma received the ball at the start of the third quarter; however their drive ended after only three plays. Connecticut's possession didn't fare much better, going only five plays before having to punt back to Oklahoma. On Oklahoma's next possession on third and nine, Landry Jones completed a 20-yard pass to Ryan Broyles to reach their 49-yard line. On the next play, Jones threw a 59-yard touchdown pass to Cameron Kenney.

When Connecticut regained the ball, Zach Frazer completed a 26-yard gain to Kashif Moore to bring them to their 49-yard line. Two plays later, the drive ended when Zach Frazer was intercepted by defensive back Jamell Fleming on Oklahoma's 45-yard line. Fleming ran the ball 55 yards for a touchdown, bringing the score to 34–10.

On the ensuing kick-off, Robbie Frey ran 95 yards for a Connecticut touchdown. Oklahoma's next drive was a short three and out when the Connecticut's defense able to stop two Murray rush attempts and a pass to him on third down. On the Huskies following possession, Jordan Todman was able to rush for 11 and 12 yards to reach the Oklahoma 48. A 19-yard pass to Anthony Sherman help the Huskies to reach the Oklahoma 24-yard line. A three-yard run from Todman and two incomplete passes from Frazer forced the Huskies to settle for a 38-yard field goal.

Oklahoma's next drive was short with only 8 yards gained before having to punt. Connecticut also went three and out, but a Ryan Broyles fumble at the Connecticut 18-yard line gave the ball back to the Huskies. Several Todman rushing attempts brought the Huskies to their 35-yard line, but the drive stalled and they were forced to punt. Nearing the end of quarter, Landry Jones was able to complete a 15-yard pass to Kenny Stills to bring them to their 45-yard line.

At the end of the third quarter, Oklahoma led Connecticut 34–20.

=== Fourth quarter ===
At the start of the fourth quarter Jones was able to complete another first down pass to Ryan Broyles for 12 yards to the Connecticut 43-yard line. A four-yard rush by Murray brought the ball to the Huskies 39-yard line, however several incomplete passes by Jones forced the drive to stall on the Connecticut's 30-yard line. On the fourth down, Bob Stoops called a trick play, a fake field goal pass, which fell incomplete and the possession was turned over on downs. With Connecticut in possession they were able to rush for four yards with Todman and Frazer completed 15-yard pass to bring them to their 49-yard line. Another Frazer pass to Anthony Sherman for 4 yards put the Huskies on the Oklahoma 47-yard line, but the drive was stopped there and they were forced to punt once again.

The next Sooners drive starting on their own 17-yard line, Jones was able to convert on a third and five to Cameron Kenney for 38 yards. On another third and five, Jones was able to convert again to Trey Franks for a 20 yards gain to bring them to the Huskies 20-yard line. Three DeMarco Murray runs brought the ball to the Connecticut five-yard line where Landry Jones threw five-yard passing touchdown to Ryan Broyles.

Halfway through the quarter, Connecticut received excellent field position with an Anthony Sherman return that brought the ball to their 47-yard line. After a Robbie Frey four-yard rushing loss, Zach Frazer passed to Anthony Sherman for 41 yards to bring the Huskies to the Oklahoma 14-yard line. The next play Frazer was sacked by Frank Alexander for an eight-yard loss. On third down, the Oklahoma defense was able to stop the pass for no gain. On fourth down, Frazer's pass was incomplete and Connecticut turned the ball over on downs.

Oklahoma on their 22-yard line, decided to run DeMarco Murray to burn time off the clock. He rushed for 14 yards on first down. A Personal Foul on Connecticut moved the ball 15 yards more to the Connecticut 49-yard line. Two more short Murray runs and an incomplete pass by Jones on third down ended the drive and left 3:01 remaining in the game.

On their own eight-yard line on first down, Zach Frazer was intercepted by Tony Jefferson for a 22-yard interception touchdown. After the kickoff on their 32-yard line and 2:40 left in the game, Todman rushed for 17 yards to get the Huskies to midfield. Frazier was able to complete an 11-yard pass and an 18-yard pass to reach the Oklahoma 22. Frazier's next pass was incomplete. On second down, he passed to Ryan Griffin for a 15-yard gain to reach the Oklahoma 7-yard line. A two-yard rush by Todman inched the Huskies to the five-yard line and a Defensive Offside penalty helped moved the ball to the Oklahoma two-yard line. On third down Todman rushed for 1 yard to reach the Oklahoma one-yard line. On fourth down, Connecticut rushed again with Todman, but was stopped for a yard loss.

With Oklahoma in possession of the ball and 14 seconds left in the game at the Oklahoma 2-yard line, Landry Jones knelt down and the game ended with Oklahoma winning by the score of 48–20.

=== Scoring summary ===
Scoring summary

Quarter	Time	Drive			Team	Scoring information	Score	
Quarter	Time	Plays	Yards	TOP	Team	Scoring information	UCONN	OU
1	10:08	9	70	2:57	OU	James Hanna 8-yard touchdown reception from Landry Jones, Jimmy Stevens kick good	0	7
1	0:24	9	81	3:21	OU	DeMarco Murray 3-yard touchdown run, Jimmy Stevens kick good	0	14
2	12:58	–	–	–	UCONN	Interception returned 46 yards for touchdown by Dwayne Gratz, Dave Teggart kick good	7	14
2	9:57	8	56	3:01	OU	41-yard field goal by Jimmy Stevens	7	17
2	2:05	14	67	4:23	OU	24-yard field goal by Jimmy Stevens	7	20
2	0:26	7	36	1:39	UCONN	37-yard field goal by Dave Teggart	10	20
3	10:55	9	70	2:57	OU	Cameron Kenney 59-yard touchdown reception from Landry Jones, Jimmy Stevens kick good	10	27
3	9:44	–	–	–	OU	Interception returned 55 yards for touchdown by OU, Jimmy Stevens kick good	10	34
3	9:30	–	–	–	UCONN	95-yard kickoff return for a touchdown by Robbie Frey, Dave Teggart kick good	17	34
3	5:04	9	50	2:21	UCONN	38-yard field goal by Dave Teggart	20	34
4	7:49	10	88	3:25	OU	Ryan Broyles 5-yard touchdown reception from Landry Jones, Jimmy Stevens kick good	20	41
4	2:40	–	–	–	OU	Interception returned 22 yards for touchdown by Tony Jefferson, Jimmy Stevens kick good	20	48
"TOP" = time of possession. For other American football terms, see Glossary of American football.							20	48

== Final statistics ==
Statistics	Connecticut	Oklahoma
First downs	19	27
Total offense, plays – yards	60–335	64–524
Rushes-yards (net)	41–112	30–95
Passing yards (net)	223	429
Passes, Comp-Att-Int	19–39–2	34–50–1
Time of Possession	31:49	28:11

In recognition for his performance during the game, Oklahoma quarterback Landry Jones was named the game's offensive most valuable player. Jones passed for a school bowl record of 429 yards which included three touchdown passes. The Sooners had 279 yards of offense in the first half, scoring on four of their five possessions. Connecticut's quarterback Zach Frazer completed 19 out of 39 of his passing attempts for 233 yards. Frazer also had two interceptions in the game; both were off of deflections from his receivers.

Oklahoma's Ryan Broyles lead all receivers with 13 receptions and 170 yards, which also included a touchdown. Oklahoma's Cameron Kenney set career highs with 7 receptions for 154 yards and a touchdown.

On the ground, Connecticut's Jordan Todman led all running backs with 32 carries for 121 yards. Oklahoma's leading rusher DeMarco Murray ran for 93 yards on 25 carries, which included a rushing touchdown.

On defense, Oklahoma's Jamell Fleming was awarded the defensive most valuable player. Fleming had intercepted a pass and returned it for a 55-yard touchdown.

== Postgame events ==
After the bowl game, junior Jordan Todman announced that he would forgo his senior year to enter the 2011 NFL draft. Twelve hours later, Randy Edsall announced that he was leaving Connecticut in order to take the Maryland head coaching job.

Despite receiving more than $2.5 million of the $17 million payout given to the Big East for Connecticut's participation, the Connecticut athletic department estimated it lost $1.8 million by playing in the Fiesta Bowl. Connecticut, which was required to purchase 17,500 tickets to the game, resold only 2,771 of those tickets, resulting in a $2.9 million loss. Travel expenses and other costs comprised the remainder of the deficit.

== See also ==
- Glossary of American football
- American football positions
