= Al Chambers =

American baseball player (born 1961)

- Designated hitter / Outfielder
- Born: March 24, 1961 (age 65); Harrisburg, Pennsylvania, U.S.
- Batted: Left Threw: Left

MLB debut
- July 23, 1983, for the Seattle Mariners

Last MLB appearance
- September 25, 1985, for the Seattle Mariners

MLB statistics
- Batting average: .208
- Home runs: 2
- Runs batted in: 11
- Stats at Baseball Reference

Teams
- Seattle Mariners (1983–1985)

Albert Eugene Chambers (born March 24, 1961), nicknamed "Choo Choo", is an American former professional baseball player from 1983 to 1985 for the Seattle Mariners of Major League Baseball (MLB). Chambers was the first pick overall in the 1979 MLB draft, selected by the Mariners out of high school, but only played in 57 MLB games.

== Playing career ==
=== Amateur career and draft ===
Chambers attended John Harris High School in Harrisburg, Pennsylvania. He had a batting average over .400 for three years of high school baseball, batting .484 his senior season and being named a high school All-American. He received a scholarship offer to play college football for the Arizona State Sun Devils.

The Mariners selected Chambers with the first overall pick in the 1979 MLB draft, praising his swing and comparing him to future Hall of Famer Dave Parker. He signed, receiving an $85,000 signing bonus (equivalent to $377,000 in 2025). In that draft, the Toronto Blue Jays selected catcher Jay Schroeder, who would become a professional football quarterback. That first round also included future MLB award winners Tim Leary, Andy Van Slyke, and Tim Wallach.

=== Seattle Mariners ===
Chambers began his professional career with the Bellingham Mariners, where he hit .247 in 1979. In 1980, he led the California League with 12 triples and was named the "most dangerous hitter" by the league's managers. He led the Eastern League with 91 walks in 1981. The Mariners converted him from a first baseman to an outfielder, where he difficulty fielding and throwing in the minors.

Chambers made his MLB debut with Seattle on July 23, 1983, hitting a single and driving in runs in his first two at bats. He hit his first MLB home run on September 9 off Mike Smithson of the Texas Rangers. He was a September call-up in 1983, 1984, and 1985, playing mostly in Triple-A the rest of the season. He hit his second and final MLB home run off LaMarr Hoyt of the Chicago White Sox on June 26, 1984.

The Mariners released Chambers in March 1986 after he began spring training with a shoulder injury. He would not play again in MLB. Chambers was one the few first overall draft picks to accrue negative wins above replacement in the majors.

=== Later career ===
Chambers had surgery on his shoulder after being released by Seattle. He played in Double-A for the Houston Astros in 1987 and Pittsburgh Pirates in 1988, also playing in the Mexican Baseball League in both seasons.

Chambers was a replacement player in spring training in 1995 for the Chicago White Sox during the ongoing players strike.

== Personal life ==
After his playing career, Chambers worked at a Hershey's chocolate factory in Pennsylvania. He also coached baseball at Harris High School.

Preceded by Bob Horner	First overall pick in the MLB Entry Draft; 1979	Succeeded by Darryl Strawberry
