= Chris Hakel =

American football player and coach (born 1969)

Profile
- Position: Quarterback

Personal information
- Born: August 9, 1969 (age 57); Rand, West Virginia, U.S.
- Listed height: 6 ft 4 in (1.93 m)
- Listed weight: 210 lb (95 kg)

Career information
- High school: Mechanicsburg Area (Mechanicsburg, Pennsylvania)
- College: William & Mary
- NFL draft: 1992: 4th round, 112th overall pick

Career history
- Washington Redskins (1992); Atlanta Falcons (1993)*; Kansas City Chiefs (1994)
- * Offseason or practice squad member only

Chris Hakel (born August 9, 1969) is an American former professional football quarterback and current coach.

Hakel is the former head coach at Mechanicsburg High School, where his coaching record was 35–70 in 10 seasons. He resigned at the end of the 2016 season after leading the Mechanicsburg Wildcats to two consecutive 0–10 seasons. Hakel is now a member of the coaching staff at Red Land High School in nearby Lewisberry, Pennsylvania.

== High school ==
Chris attended Mechanicsburg Area Senior High School. In 1987, he led the team to their first District 3-AAAA Football Championship. Besides playing quarterback, he played safety and punted as well.

== College career ==
As a collegiate quarterback at the William and Mary, he led the leading offense in NCAA Division I-AA. He held the school's single-season passing record of 3,414 yards until Lang Campbell broke it in 2004.

== Professional career ==
In 1992, Chris was drafted in the fourth round (#112) in the NFL draft, by the Washington Redskins. He was put on injured reserves for the season. In the 1993 pre-season Hakel was given a second shot by the Redskins but was cut by the Redskins and was signed by the Atlanta Falcons and was on the practice squad. After being cut by the Falcons, the Kansas City Chiefs signed Hakel to the 1994 53 man roster.
