= 1979 Major League Baseball draft =

Baseball draft of amateur players

General information
- Date: June 5–7, 1979

Overview
- First selection: Al Chambers; Seattle Mariners
- First round selections: 26

The 1979 Major League Baseball draft was held on June 5–7, 1979, via conference call.

== First round selections ==
= All-Star	= Baseball Hall of Famer

The following are the first-round picks in the 1979 Major League Baseball draft.

Pick	Player	Team	Position	Hometown/School
1	Al Chambers	Seattle Mariners	OF	Harrisburg, Pennsylvania
2	Tim Leary	New York Mets	RHP	UCLA
3	Jay Schroeder	Toronto Blue Jays	C	Pacific Palisades, California
4	Brad Komminsk	Atlanta Braves	OF	Lima, Ohio
5	Juan Bustabad *	Oakland Athletics	SS	Hialeah, Florida
6	Andy Van Slyke	St. Louis Cardinals	OF	New Hartford, New York
7	John Bohnet	Cleveland Indians	LHP	Vallejo, California
8	John Mizerock	Houston Astros	C	Punxsutawney, Pennsylvania
9	Steve Buechele *	Chicago White Sox	SS	Fullerton, California
10	Tim Wallach	Montreal Expos	1B	Cal State Fullerton
11	Kevin Brandt	Minnesota Twins	OF	Nekoosa, Wisconsin
12	Jon Perlman	Chicago Cubs	RHP	Baylor
13	Rick Leach	Detroit Tigers	OF	Michigan
14	Joe Lansford	San Diego Padres	1B	San Jose, California
15	Scott Garrelts	San Francisco Giants (Note: Pick from California Angels as compensation for signing of free agent Jim Barr)	RHP	Buckley, Illinois
16	Steve Howe	Los Angeles Dodgers (Note: Pick from Pittsburgh Pirates as compensation for signing of free agent Lee Lacy)	LHP	Michigan
17	Jerry Don Gleaton	Texas Rangers	LHP	Texas
18	Rick Luecken *	San Francisco Giants	RHP	Houston, Texas
19	Rick Seilheimer	Chicago White Sox (Note: Pick from Baltimore Orioles as compensation for signing of free agent Steve Stone)	C	Brenham, Texas
20	Dan Lamar	Cincinnati Reds (Note: Pick from Philadelphia Phillies as compensation for signing of free agent Pete Rose)	C	Houston, Texas
21	Atlee Hammaker	Kansas City Royals	LHP	East Tennessee State
22	Mike Sullivan	Cincinnati Reds	RHP	Clemson
23	Chris Baker	Detroit Tigers (Note: Pick from Milwaukee Brewers as compensation for signing of free agent Jim Slaton)	OF	Dearborn Heights, Michigan
24	Bob Geren	San Diego Padres (Note: Pick from Los Angeles Dodgers as compensation for signing of free agent Derrel Thomas)	C	San Diego, California
25	Steve Perry	Los Angeles Dodgers (Note: Pick from New York Yankees as compensation for signing of free agent Tommy John)	RHP	Michigan
26	Mike Stenhouse *	Oakland Athletics (Note: Pick from Boston Red Sox as compensation for signing of free agent Steve Renko)	OF	Harvard

* Did not sign

== Other notable selections ==
Later rounds of the draft included the following notable players:

- Milt Thompson, 2nd round, 29th overall Atlanta Braves
- Derek Tatsuno, 2nd round, 40th overall San Diego Padres (did not sign)
- Dan Marino, 4th round, 99th overall Kansas City Royals (did not sign)
- Mark Thurmond, 5th round, 118th overall San Diego Padres
- Ron Gardenhire, 6th round, 132nd overall New York Mets
- Bill Doran, 6th round, 138th overall Houston Astros
- Harold Reynolds, 6th round, 144th overall San Diego Padres (did not sign)
- Von Hayes†, 7th round 163rd overall Cleveland Indians
- Johnny Ray, 12th round, 294th overall Houston Astros
- Pete O'Brien, 15th round 381st overall Texas Rangers
- Bud Black, 17th round, 417th overall Seattle Mariners
- Orel Hershiser†, 17th round, 440th overall Los Angeles Dodgers
- John Elway, 18th round, 463rd overall Kansas City Royals (did not sign)
- Don Mattingly†, 19th round, 493rd overall New York Yankees
- Brett Butler†, 23rd round, 573 overall Atlanta Braves
- Curt Warner, 32nd round, 784th overall Philadelphia Phillies

† All-Star
‡ Hall of Famer

A number of future football players were drafted in 1979, including John Elway (Kansas City), Kevin House (St. Louis), Dan Marino (Kansas City), Jay Schroeder (Toronto), Jack Thompson (Seattle), and Curt Warner (Philadelphia).

== See also ==
- Johnson, Lloyd; Wolff, Miles, eds. (1997). The Encyclopedia of Minor League Baseball (2nd ed.). Durham, N.C.: Baseball America. ISBN 978-0-9637189-8-3.

Preceded by Bob Horner	1st Overall Picks; Al Chambers	Succeeded by Darryl Strawberry
