= Shawn Abner =

American baseball player (born 1966)

- Outfielder
- Born: June 17, 1966 (age 60); Hamilton, Ohio, U.S.
- Batted: Right Threw: Right

MLB debut
- September 8, 1987, for the San Diego Padres

Last MLB appearance
- October 3, 1992, for the Chicago White Sox

MLB statistics
- Batting average: .227
- Home runs: 11
- Runs batted in: 71
- Stats at Baseball Reference

Teams
- San Diego Padres (1987–1991); California Angels (1991); Chicago White Sox (1992)

Shawn Wesley Abner (born June 17, 1966) is an American former professional baseball outfielder who played in Major League Baseball (MLB) from 1987 to 1992 for the San Diego Padres, California Angels, and Chicago White Sox. In 392 career games, Abner had a batting average of .227 with 191 hits, 11 home runs, and 71 runs batted in. The New York Mets drafted Abner with the first overall selection in the 1984 MLB draft. He is considered a notable draft bust.

== Early life ==
Shawn Wesley Abner was born on June 17, 1966, in Hamilton, Ohio, to Ben Sr. and Carol. In middle school, Abner played American football as a running back, though in high school he switched positions to quarterback because his mother stated she did not want Abner to get hurt.

Abner attended high school at Mechanicsburg Area Senior High School in Mechanicsburg, Pennsylvania, where he played football, and baseball as a center fielder. In 1981, in football, the Mechanicsburg Wildcats finished as runners up in the Capital Area Conference (CAC) to Red Land High School as Abner was named to the CAC All-Star team, composed of the best players in the conference, as a defensive back.

The Mets selected him first overall in the 1984 MLB draft. When Abner signed with the Mets, his $150,500 (equivalent to $466,000 in 2025) signing bonus was the highest in the history of baseball.

== Professional career ==
On December 11, 1986, the Mets traded Abner, Kevin Mitchell, Stan Jefferson, Kevin Armstrong, and Kevin Brown to the San Diego Padres for Kevin McReynolds, Gene Walter, and Adam Ging. Abner made his debut on September 8, 1987, in a loss to the Atlanta Braves. Abner entered in the top of the eighth inning as a pinch hitter for Lance McCullers and flied out to center field in his first major league at bat.

The light-hitting Abner played sparingly over the next five seasons for San Diego, used mostly as a reserve outfielder. He was traded to the California Angels in 1991 and signed by the Chicago White Sox in 1992. His season with the White Sox was probably his best, as he attained a .279 batting average over 97 games.

Abner injured his knee the following season playing basketball before a Triple-A game for the Omaha Royals, and never played in the majors again. While playing in MLB, Abner stood at 6 feet 1 inch (185 cm) and weighed 190 pounds (86 kg). He batted and threw right-handed. In 392 career games, Abner had a batting average of .227 with 191 hits, 11 home runs, and 71 runs batted in. Abner is widely-considered a draft bust.

== Personal life ==
Abner married his high-school sweetheart Kris in October 1987 at A Little White Wedding Chapel in Las Vegas. During the MLB off-season, Abner enjoyed playing blackjack in casinos in Las Vegas. His son Seth "Scump" Abner, is a former professional Call of Duty player.

On August 28, 2019, Abner was charged with animal cruelty for leaving his 14 year old husky alone at home, for over a month, resulting in the dog's death. Abner failed to ask anyone to care for the dog while he was away. He pleaded guilty to felony aggravated animal cruelty and was sentenced in January 2020 to 4.5–23 months in prison.

Preceded by Tim Belcher	First overall pick in the MLB Entry Draft; 1984	Succeeded by B.J. Surhoff
