= Tim Belcher =

American baseball player and coach (born 1961)

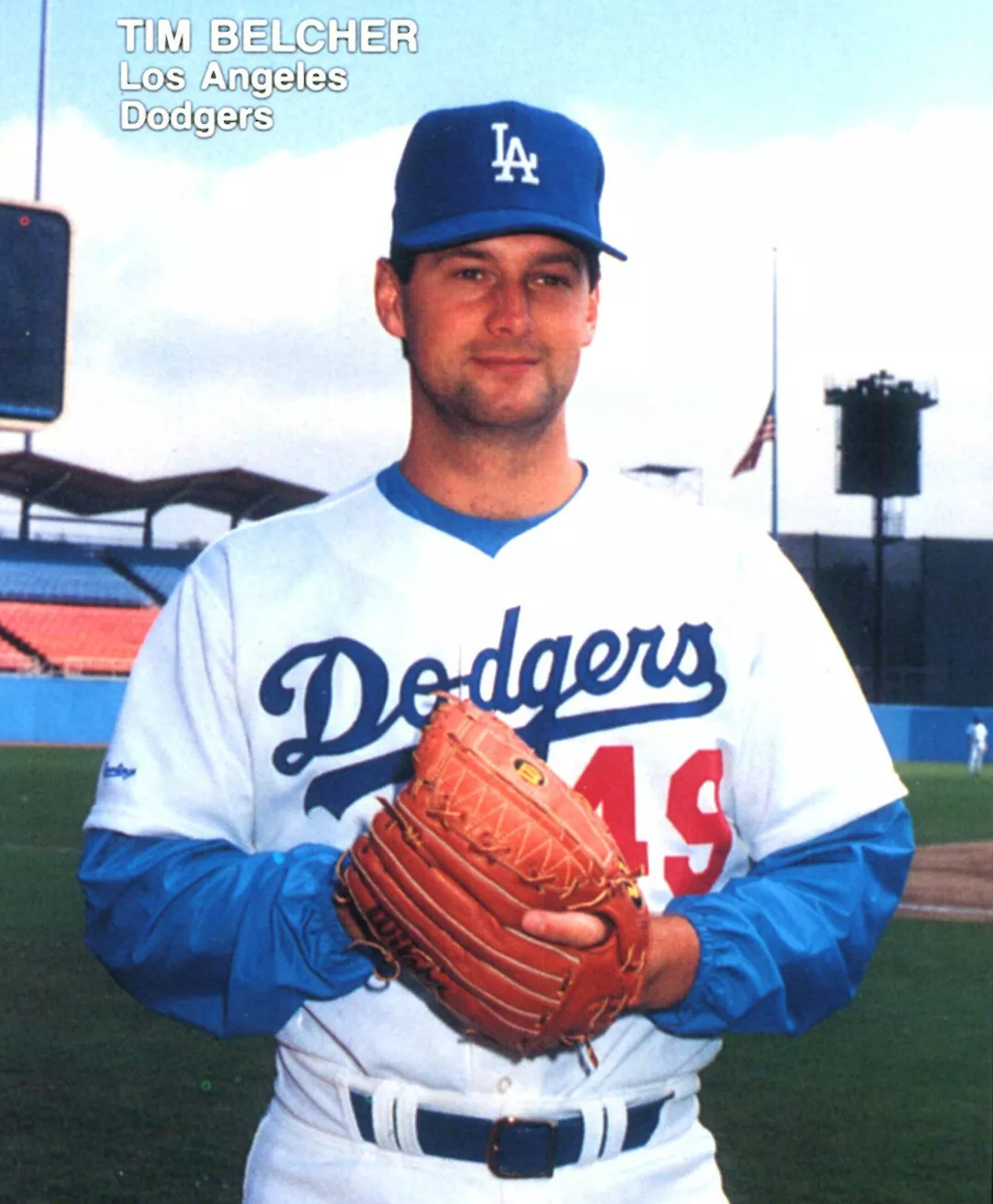
- Belcher with the Los Angeles Dodgers c. 1988
- Pitcher
- Born: October 19, 1961 (age 64); Mount Gilead, Ohio, U.S.
- Batted: Right Threw: Right

MLB debut
- September 6, 1987, for the Los Angeles Dodgers

Last MLB appearance
- September 30, 2000, for the Anaheim Angels

MLB statistics
- Win–loss record: 146–140
- Earned run average: 4.16
- Strikeouts: 1,519
- Stats at Baseball Reference

Teams
- As player: Los Angeles Dodgers (1987–1991); Cincinnati Reds (1992–1993); Chicago White Sox (1993); Detroit Tigers (1994); Seattle Mariners (1995); Kansas City Royals (1996–1998); Anaheim Angels (1999–2000); As coach: Cleveland Indians (2010–2011)

Career highlights and awards
- World Series champion (1988)
Medals
Baseball
Representing the United States
Pan American Games
| Bronze medal – third place | 1983 Caracas | Team |

Timothy Wayne Belcher (born October 19, 1961) is an American former professional baseball pitcher. He played in Major League Baseball (MLB) from 1987 to 2000 for seven different teams. He was named The Sporting News Rookie Pitcher of the Year in 1988 for the National League. After his playing career, he served as pitching coach for the Cleveland Indians in 2010 and 2011.

== Career ==
During his 14-year baseball career, Belcher pitched from 1987 to 2000 for seven different ballclubs: the Los Angeles Dodgers (1987–1991), Cincinnati Reds (1992–1993), Chicago White Sox (1993), Detroit Tigers (1994), Seattle Mariners (1995), Kansas City Royals (1996–1998), and Anaheim Angels (1999–2000).

Belcher played high school baseball at Highland High School and intercollegiate varsity baseball at Mount Vernon Nazarene College in Mount Vernon, Ohio. He was the first draft pick in the 1983 Major League Baseball draft, selected by the Minnesota Twins. However, he refused to sign with the Twins, and instead was selected in the 1984 supplemental draft by the New York Yankees. He was picked up by the Oakland Athletics in the compensation pool.

After climbing through the A's system to Triple-A, he was traded to Los Angeles on September 3, 1987, as the "player to be named later" in the Rick Honeycutt transaction. He made his MLB debut on September 6 as a Dodger. Belcher was a member of the 1988 Dodgers team that won the World Series, defeating the Oakland Athletics. Belcher won one game in the World Series after winning twice in the National League Championship Series. In 1989, he led the National League with 10 complete games and led MLB with eight shutouts, while placing in the top ten in wins and ERA. His 1989 shutout total has not since been equaled in MLB.

Los Angeles traded Belcher to the Reds in 1991 as a part of the Eric Davis multi-player transaction. He tied a career high with 15 wins for the Reds, but was dealt again, this time to the White Sox in the middle of the 1993 season at the trading deadline. He won Game Four of the American League Championship Series in relief against the Toronto Blue Jays. Filing for free agency, he signed with the Tigers for 1994, but led the American League in losses with 15 that strike-shortened year.

He returned in 1995 to the Reds on a one-year minor-league contract, but was soon dealt by them a second time, this time in May to the Mariners. New York Yankees superstar shortstop Derek Jeter got his first major league hit off Belcher in the Kingdome on May 30, 1995. At the end of the regular season, Belcher lost two post-season games, the only two playoff losses he suffered in his career; after Game 2 of the 1995 American League Division Series, he raged in the locker room area and assaulted a cameraman for filming him after giving up a game-winning home run to Yankee catcher Jim Leyritz. Again becoming a free agent, he signed with the Royals for the 1996 season, spending the next three years with Kansas City and leading the team in wins each season.

On June 5, 1999, Belcher was involved in an on-field brawl at Dodger Stadium. At the time a member of the Anaheim Angels, Belcher was involved in an altercation with then-Los Angeles Dodgers pitcher Chan Ho Park. Park claimed that Belcher had tagged him too hard while tagging him out. Park accused Belcher of making racist comments before Park’s attack on Belcher.

Belcher played his final game on September 30, 2000. He retired in spring training in 2001, his effectiveness gone following a series of injuries. He later served as a Special Assistant to Baseball Operations in the Cleveland Indians organization, and was the team's major-league pitching coach during the 2010 and 2011 seasons.

| Preceded by Shawon Dunston | First overall pick in the MLB Entry Draft; 1983 | Succeeded by Shawn Abner |
| Preceded by Fernando Valenzuela; Orel Hershiser | Los Angeles Dodgers Opening Day; Starting pitcher 1989; 1991 | Succeeded by Orel Hershiser; Ramón Martínez |
