= Zach Frazer =

American football player (born 1988)

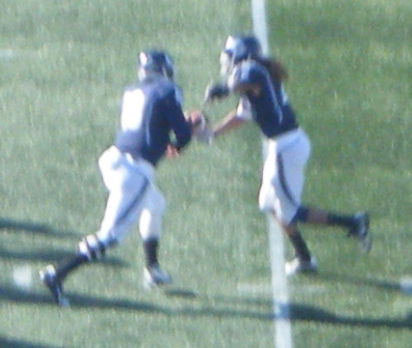
- Frazer handing off to Andre Dixon during the 2010 PapaJohns.com Bowl

No. 9
- Position: Quarterback

Personal information
- Born: February 23, 1988 (age 38); Mechanicsburg, Pennsylvania, U.S.
- Listed height: 6 ft 4 in (1.93 m)
- Listed weight: 231 lb (105 kg)

Career information
- High school: Mechanicsburg Area Senior (Mechanicsburg, PA)
- College: Connecticut
- NFL draft: 2012: undrafted

Career history
- Triangle Razorbacks (2012) National Ligaen; Chicago Rush (2013)*; San Antonio Talons (2013)
- * Offseason or practice squad member only

Career AFL statistics
- Comp. / Att.: 19 / 40
- Passing yards: 225
- TD–INT: 3–3
- QB rating: 52.6
- Stats at ArenaFan.com

Zachary David Frazer (born February 23, 1988) is an American former football quarterback who is now a coach. He played most of his college career for the University of Connecticut Huskies. He originally was a member of the University of Notre Dame Fighting Irish during his freshman year.

Frazer was not drafted coming out of college, but played professionally in Denmark and Arena football. He played football in his high school days at Mechanicsburg Area Senior High School. Frazier was a participant in the 2005 Elite 11 Competition.

== College career ==
Frazer signed a national letter of intent to play quarterback for the Fighting Irish on February 1, 2006. After sitting out his freshman year as a redshirt, Frazer was told that he wouldn't compete for the starting quarterback position after spring practice in 2007. On July 1, 2007, he announced that he was transferring to Connecticut. At Connecticut Frazier was the starting quarterback from 2008 to 2010.

== Professional career ==
Frazer signed with the Danish team Triangle Razorbacks in the National Ligaen after the 2012 NFL Scouting Combine. In October 2012, Triangle Razorbacks became Danish Champions after winning the Mermaid Bowl. Frazer was the starting quarterback for the whole season.

In March 2013, Frazer was assigned with the Chicago Rush of the Arena Football League, Frazer was reassigned in April before playing a game for the Rush.

On April 24, 2013, Frazer was assigned with the San Antonio Talons. On March 10, 2014, he was reassigned by the Talons.

== Coaching ==
Frazier has been a coach in Norway for the Oslo Vikings as well as the high school level and at Ave Maria University in USA.
