= Mechanicsburg Area Senior High School =

Public school in Pennsylvania, United States

Coordinates: 40.2049°N 77.0172°W

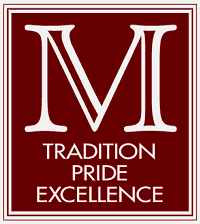

Location
- 500 South Broad Street; Mechanicsburg, Cumberland County, Pennsylvania 17055; United States

Information
- Type: Public
- Motto: "Tradition, Pride, Excellence"
- Established: 1875
- School district: Mechanicsburg Area School District
- Principal: Joseph Reidy
- Grades: 9–12
- Enrollment: 1,371 (2023-2024)
- Student to teacher ratio: 13.56
- Colors: Maroon , steel
- Athletics conference: Mid-Penn Conference, PIAA
- Mascot: Wildcats
- Nickname: Wildcats
- Rivals: Red Land, Northern York
- Newspaper: The Torch
- Yearbook: The Artisan
- Website: highschool.mbgsd.org/o/mashs

Mechanicsburg Area Senior High School is a secondary school located on 500 South Broad Street in the borough of Mechanicsburg, west of Harrisburg, Pennsylvania. The school is part of the Mechanicsburg Area School District.

== Communities ==
Mechanicsburg Area Senior High (MASH), which accepts students ranging from grade 9–12, serves several communities, including the Boroughs of Mechanicsburg and Shiremanstown, Upper Allen Township, and the villages of Grantham and Bowmansdale.

The students begin at the Kindergarten Academy then proceed to one of the elementary schools (grades 1-3): Shepherdstown, Upper Allen, Northside, or Broad Street. All 4th and 5th graders attend Elmwood Academy, which was redesignated as only 4th and 5th graders in 2018. They then progress to Mechanicsburg Middle School (6-8), and then Mechanicsburg High School (9-12).

== School information and history ==
Mechanicsburg High School was founded and held its first commencement in 1875, with one graduate.

Mechanicsburg High School has been located in three different buildings since its foundation. The Simpson Street School (now a luxury apartment complex) was completed in 1872 and was expanded upon in 1929. In 1957, the school had expanded past capacity, and a new building was built along Elmwood Avenue. The Elmwood Avenue school served as the high school for only 12 years, as the current building on 500 South Broad Street was built and completed in 1969. The Elmwood building was converted into Mechanicsburg Area Intermediate School (MAIS), and in 2005 was renovated again to be used as an Elementary School. In the mid-1980s, a wing was added to the current high school building to suit capacity needs. In 2002, the current building underwent extensive renovations. New entrances were constructed to be aesthetically consistent with the then-new middle school's entrance.

In 2019, the Wildcat Activity Center (WAC) replaced the school's outdoor basketball courts.

Two major additions were completed in 2022: a hallway in the front of the school and a 2-story wing in the rear (referred to as the "New Wing") that now houses the weight room. Along with this project, a complete overhaul of the old building changed its layout and left it stylistically consistent with the recent additions. The school's extensive 6-year renovation will be finished with the completion of a new pool and track and field area.

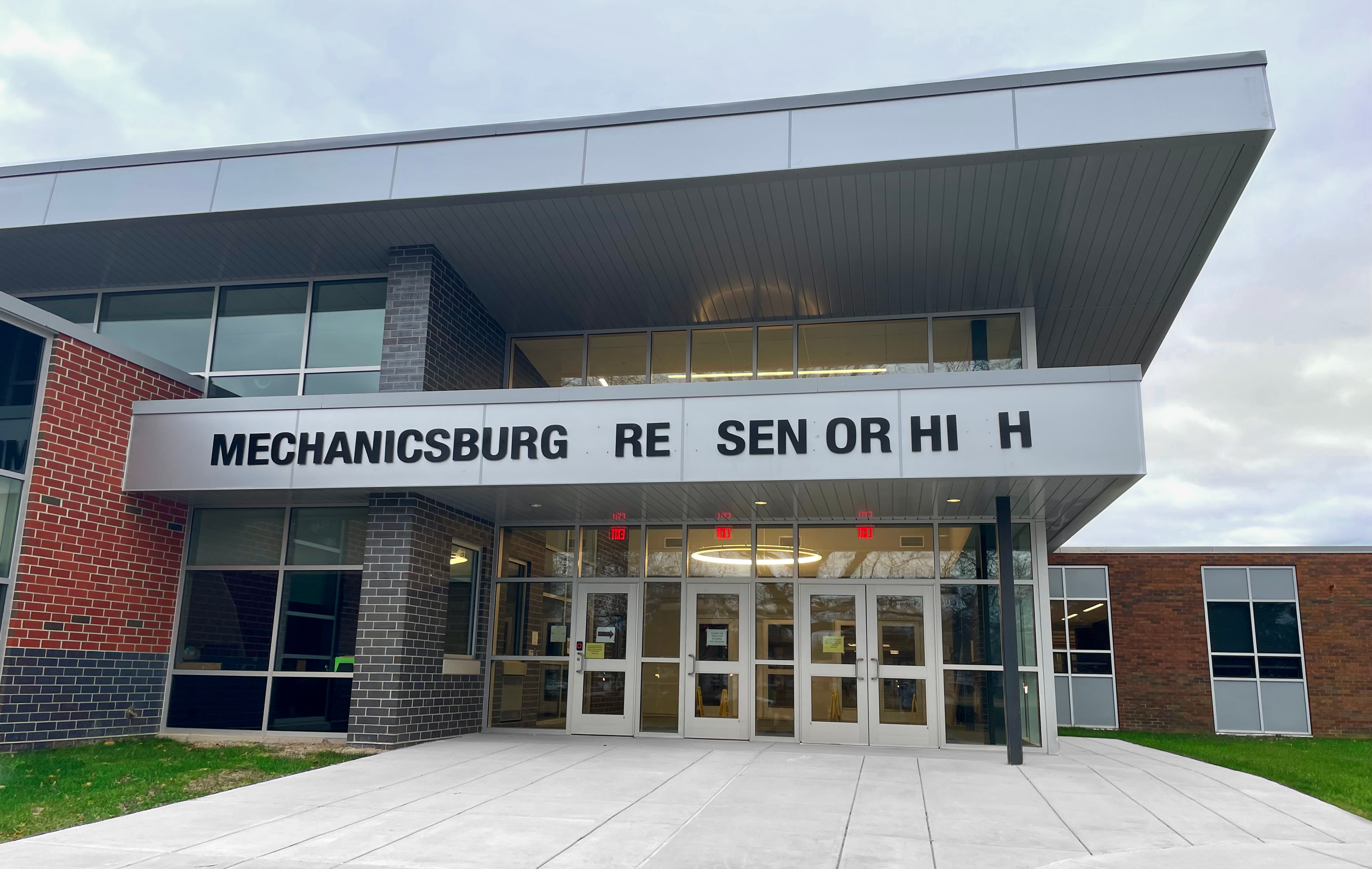
Mechanicsburg Area Senior High's new main entrance built as part of the 2022 addition.

On July 6, 2010, then-Governor Ed Rendell publicly signed Pennsylvania's $28 billion budget at Elmwood Elementary.

The Wildcat

The school's mascot was first referenced as the "Wildcat" in a 1937 edition of the school newspaper, The Torch. Prior to this, Mechanicsburg's athletic teams were referenced as the "Steel-and-Maroon" or the "Maroon-and-Steel". No information is currently known as to why the school chose a wildcat as its mascot or the exact date when it was chosen.

== Extracurriculars ==
=== Clubs ===
Mechanicsburg High School sponsors a variety of extracurricular clubs and teams focusing on academic development. As of the 2012-13 school year, the high school sponsored chapters of the National Honor Society, National Art Honor Society, National French Honor Society, National German Honor Society, National Latin Honor Society, National Spanish Honor Society, and Tri-M. Students also annually publish the Muse literary and arts magazine, the monthly Torch newspaper, and the annual Artisan yearbook. Students can compete with interscholastic academic teams in Quiz Bowl, Speech, Memory, and Math. In 2013, the Memory Team won the High School National Championship of the USA Memory Championship in New York City.

Mechanicsburg hosts a variety of fund-raising and social awareness events throughout the school year. Lift For Life, a charity weightlifting competition is held in early March at the High School to raise money for kidney cancer research, in honor of Don Shirley, a Mechanicsburg High School baseball coach who died of kidney cancer. Mechanicsburg also sponsors a chapter of Key Club.

In the 2018-19 school year, there was a controversy about the school's Bible club passing out Bibles to students during free time, which resulted in a federal lawsuit and an eventually compromise. The story was picked up by the national media.

=== Music program ===
==== Marching band ====
The Mechanicsburg High School Marching Band is the school's marching band . They are called the Wildcats. Local residents, members, and fans associated with the group also refer to them as the "Maroon Machine."

History

Mechanicsburg has a rich marching band tradition going back to 1929. They began competing in the Tournament of Bands in 1988.

- 1988: First win at Tournament of Bands Chapter VI championships.
- 1989: First appearance at Atlantic Coast Championships, placed 2nd in Group 3. The show included music from Aaron Copland's Appalachian Spring, Candide and Niner Two.
- 1992: First win at Atlantic Coast Championships, competing in Group 4. This elaborate show featured songs from Disney's Beauty and the Beast, complete with set pieces, tarps, and dancing characters. Characters included in the show were Mrs. Potts, Lumiere, Cogsworth, and Chip. The band edged out Carlisle High School (Carlisle, Pennsylvania), who finished in 2nd place, to bring home this trophy. The band director at this time was Michael Snyder.
- 2003: This was a successful year for the band which won every competition it entered up to the Tournament of Bands Atlantic Coast championship.
- 2005: The 2005 show was entitled "A Suite For Winter". The band claimed 1st place prize on the night of November 12, 2005 at Lackawanna County Stadium in Moosic, Pennsylvania. The band won first place in Group 3 with a score of 98.80, the highest score ever in TOB history (tying Mechanicsburg's 98.80 Group 4 output in 1994). The show also earned the caption awards for high music, visual, and brass.
- 2006: The band successfully defended its title on November 12, 2006 when they again won the TOB Group 3 Atlantic Coast Championships. Their show, entitled "Flight" earned a score of 98.05. In addition to the first-place finish, they were awarded the trophies for high music, visual, percussion, and auxiliary.
- 2007: On November 10, 2007 the MASH band performed their 2007 show, "An Irish Heritage" and won their third title in a row at the TOB Group 3 Atlantic Coast Championships at the Delaware State University's Alumni Stadium in Dover, DE with a record-tying score of 98.80 (Set by themselves, twice). They were additionally awarded for high music, visual, auxiliary, and brass.
- 2008:On November 16, 2008 at J. Birney Crum Stadium in Allentown, PA, the band performed their show "Above the Clouds" and won their fourth straight Group 3 TOB ACC title with a score of 97.35. The class of 2009 subsequently became the first Mechanicsburg graduates to ever win four straight championships. The band also took home awards for high music, visual, brass and percussion. This was the band's final year under director Dane Hildebrand. Hildebrand finished his 10th year as Mechanicsburg's director on high note, winning for the sixth time.
- 2009: The band won its fifth consecutive Group 3 TOB Atlantic Coast Championship at Hersheypark Stadium in Hershey, PA on November 1, 2009. The Sunday night performance of their field show "Earth" earned them a score of 96.85 along with high music, visual, percussion, and auxiliary. It was their 11th ACC victory in school history, having already won Group IV in 1992, '94, '95, and '96, and Group III in '99, 2000, '05, '06, '07, and '08. They continue to hold the Group III high-score record (98.80 in 2005 and 2007) and the Group IV record (98.80 in 1994). These three 98.80s also stand as the overall highest scores received in the history of Tournament Of Bands. It was the first season with new band director Michael Drobish.
- 2010: Back in Group 4 competition for the first time since 1997, the 2010 MASH band were not able to stretch their winning streak to 6 years. With a score of 95.25, their show "Ice" earned them a 3rd-place finish and high auxiliary at Atlantic Coast Championships at Hersheypark Stadium in Hershey, Pennsylvania.
- 2011: Changing back to Group 3, the MASH band also had a change of director in 2011. Ben Goldsborough, who was previously band director at nearby Cedar Cliff High School, became the new leader of the Mechanicsburg Marching Band program. In a transition year, the band placed 3rd again at Atlantic Coast Championships at Hersheypark Stadium with a score of 94.40 as well as winning the high auxiliary award for the fifth time in six years. 94.40 is the lowest Atlantic Coast Championship score ever in MASH's TOB history.
- 2012: In its second season under Goldsborough's direction, the 2012 MASH band performed their new-look show titled "The Factory" at Atlantic Coast Championships in Hershey, PA and regained their place at the top of TOB's Group 3, earning a score of 97.70 as well as taking home the captions for high visual, percussion, auxiliary, and brass, while sharing the high music award with local rivals Camp Hill High School. In addition to competing in Tournament of Bands, the 2012 MASH band competed in another marching band circuit, USBands (formerly known as USSBA). The band took first place at a USBands competition at Cedar Cliff High School and performed at the USBands National Championships on November 10, 2012 at MetLife Stadium in East Rutherford, New Jersey. The marching band took third place with a score of 96.388.
- 2015: Now at Group 5 Open in the USBands circuit, and Group 4 Open in TOB, the 2015 MASH band performed a new show called "Nightscapes" at the TOB Chapter 6 Championships. It was at Cedar Cliff High School in West Shore Stadium, but they lost to the West Shore Marching Band. They went to USBands National Championships, and placed 1st in Group 5 Open. Not only did the band win the Overall Group 5 Championship, but they also brought home awards for Outstanding Colorguard, High Visual, and High Music. The band was directed by Ben Goldsborough.
- 2016: The band's show in 2016 was entitled "Red Riding Hood." It put a dark twist on the classic fairy tale in which Red is the leader of the wolf pack. They were still in Group 4 Open in TOB and Group 5 Open in USBands. They placed first in TOB Chapter 6 Championships and USBands State Championships, then 2nd in USBands National Championships.
- 2017: In 2017 the band suffered a loss in numbers and was demoted to group 4-Open in USBands. The MASH Marching Band’s 2017 show was titled “The Heist.” It told the story of the Gardner Museum Heist. They placed 8th out of 16 in their MetLife performance.
- 2018: The 2018 show is titled "Into the Deep Unknown". It describes going out to sea and adventure away from home. At USBands State Championships, located at West Chester University, Mechanicsburg won 1st place in Group 5 Open with the title of best percussion. One week later, at Mid-Atlantic Regionals in Ijamsville, Maryland, Mechanicsburg won second in Group 5 during prelims, and went on to win 2nd out of 12 bands at finals with a score of 98.100. They finished their season at the USBands Open Class National Championships at MetLife Stadium, where they were placed 5th in Group 5 with a score of 95.438.
- 2019: The bands 2019 show was entitled "Tipping Point" and was inspired by the Bluecoats 2014 show "Tilt". This show performed well, winning multiple competitions in the Tournament of Bands circuit. The band tied for 2nd at TOB Atlantic Coast Championships with a score of 95.50.
- 2020: The bands 2020 production was entitled "Unhinged". Covid caused a large number of students to leave the band demoting the band to V-USBands (2020's virtual competitive circuit) Division 2. Despite this hardship the band took 1st overall at Nationals.
- 2021: The bands 2021 program was also titled "Unhinged", highlighting topics of isolation and the fear of the outside world post-pandemic. The band competed in multiple circuits, including USBands where they took 2nd in the 3 open class and 4th overall.
- 2022: The bands 2022 program was titled "Fractured" based on the Blue Devils 2010 show "Through a Glass, Darkly". The band competed with USBands and Bands of America this season. The band this season had limited competitive success still recovering from covid, they placed 4th of 4 at State Championships in group 4 open and 6th of 10 at mid atlantic regionals.
- 2023: The bands program was titled "Rule the World" featuring musical selections from Tears for Fears and A-ha. This year the band continued competing with USBands but returned to class 5 Open. This show highlighted the fight between technology and nature as humans tread down a path of technology dependance. Due to multiple rain cancelations the band was only scored twice this season placing 5th of 6 at state championships and 3rd of 10 at mid atlantic regionals.
- 2024: This seasons show was titled "Eleanor Rigby" focusing on the dichotomy of loneliness and community brought by social media. The show featured music from The Beatles and The Cinematic Orchestra. This year was a great success competitively, the band placed 3rd at PA State Championships 2nd at Mid Atlantic Regional Championships and 4th at USBands National Championships.
- 2025: The 2025 show was entitled "The Butterfly Effect," with visual motifs of a butterfly gaining color in its wings and musically showcasing dichotomy between different sections on the field. The band competed in five events including a 1st Place finish at Mid-Atlantic Regionals held at Cedar Cliff Stadium in New Cumberland, Pennsylvania. The season ended with a 1st Place, Group V, Open finish at the USBands Pennsylvania State Championships held at Downingtown West High School in Downingtown, Pennsylvania. The band was awarded a score of 96.0 and won the caption awards for Best Visual, Best Music, Best Percussion, and Best Overall Effect.

Mid-Atlantic regional Championships

Their scores at the Mid-Atlantic regional Championships are:

Year	Group	Score	Place	Caption Awards
1989	Group 3	95.95	2nd	
1990	Group 4	95.15	4th	
1991	Group 3	96.80	3rd	
1992	Group 4	97.25	1st	
1993	Group 4	96.85	2nd	Visual
1994	Group 4	98.80*	1st	
1995	Group 4	97.65	1st	
1996	Group 4	98.05	1st	Music, Visual
1997	Group 4	94.55	9th	
1998	Group 3	95.90	4th	Auxiliary
1999	Group 3	97.25	1st	Percussion, Auxiliary
2000	Group 3	98.55	1st	Music, Visual, Percussion, Auxiliary, Brass
2001	Group 3	94.95	5th	
2002	Group 3	94.55	5th	
2003	Group 3	96.40	2nd	Music, Auxiliary
2004	Group 3	97.45	2nd	
2005	Group 3	98.80*	1st	Music, Visual, Brass
2006	Group 3	98.05	1st	Music, Visual, Percussion, Auxiliary
2007	Group 3	98.80*	1st	Music, Visual, Auxiliary, Brass
2008	Group 3	97.35	1st	Music, Visual, Percussion, Brass
2009	Group 3	96.85	1st	Music, Visual, Percussion, Auxiliary
2010	Group 4	95.25	3rd	Auxiliary
2011	Group 3	94.40	3rd	Auxiliary
2012	Group 3	97.70	1st	Music**, Visual, Percussion, Auxiliary, Brass
2023	Group 5	90.10	3rd	
2024	Group 5	93.95	4th	
2025	Group 5	96.00	1st	Music, Visual, Overall Effect, Percussion

*TOB record high score **Co-winner

==== Indoor Percussion and Winterguard ====
Mechanicsburg is noted for its indoor percussion ensemble, a competitor in the Winter Guard International and TIA Percussion circuit. In 2012, they won 2nd place at the WGI tournament in Dayton, Ohio with a score of 96.10.

In 2006, they won 1st at KIDA Championships, and in 2007, they were promoted to the World class in the WGI circuit. And in 2008, the Percussion Ensemble placed 3rd in the TIA Percussion circuit at Wildwoods, New Jersey.

Mechanicsburg Winterguard was started in 1997 by Kristy Templin and Bart Sword. It started with a handful of kids and has continued to grow from 1 program to 3 indoor color guard programs. The Color Guard program has won 13 out of the 16 years it has been in existence. 2006 Mechanicsburg Scholastic A class guard went to Dayton, Ohio for WGI (Winterguard International) championships, coming out eighth in the world. They were subsequently moved up to Scholastic Open class. The 2007 season ended with the Open guard as semi-finalists at WGI championships. In 2008, the Mechanicsburg Scholastic Open colorguard broke top 15 at world championships, making them a WGI finalist. In 2009, the 14 girls went to South Brunswick, New Jersey and won the WGI Power Regional with a score of 87.6. When the guard competed at world championships, they placed 4th with a 93.3, missing the bronze by three tenths of a point. In 2010, the guard began to compete in Scholastic World, the highest class of competition. Locally, the Color Guard has dominated the Keystone Indoor Drill Association's Blue Class for years, however recently a new Platinum Class has been created for color guards of this caliber. In 2011, Sal Salas, Joe Heininger, Kristy Templin and Jeff Kahley joined together to design the shows. The color guard placed 2nd in the Nation in Scholastic A and brought home the silver medal. As a result of their placement, the color guard was promoted to the Open Class Division. In 2012, they were a semi-finalist in the Scholastic Open Class Division.

==== Musical Theatre ====
MASH is well known in the mid-state area for its musical theatre department, which has been under the leadership of Eric Dundore for more than two decades. Dundore retired at the end of the 2013-14 school year and was replaced by his friend and colleague Gordon Kaslusky, who was the music and chorus teacher at Mechanicsburg Middle School.

=== Athletics ===
Varsity and junior varsity athletic activities are under the Pennsylvania Interscholastic Athletic Association. Currently, the district offers varsity and junior varsity opportunities in girls cheerleading, field hockey, and softball; boys baseball, football, lacrosse and wrestling; and boys and girls basketball, cross country, golf, soccer, swimming, tennis, track and field, volleyball and water polo. All athletics are paid for by the school district and do not require a "pay to play" fee, with the exceptions of boys lacrosse and boys/girls water polo, which were accepted as varsity sports in 2008 under such condition.

=== Retired numbers ===
- 7 - Mike Edwards - baseball, basketball, football (retired for baseball only)
- 8 - Don Shirley - head baseball coach (retired for baseball only)
- 16 - Shawn Abner - baseball, football
- 41 - Dan Lewis - football running back
- 45 - Ryan Priest - football
- 61 - Earl "Bud" Kohlhaas - football

=== Football ===
The football program is currently in the Class AAAA classification of the PIAA, and are members of the Keystone Division of the Mid-Penn Conference (formerly Mid-Penn Division II and South Penn Conference). The Wildcats claim 14 conference championships, with the most recent in 2024. Six of the Wildcats' championships come after the foundation of the Mid-Penn Conference in 1982, including three of the first five in the conference's history. The overall record of the program from 1919 to 2011 is 543-368-49, with only Steelton-Highspire High School having more overall wins in District 3. In addition to being ranked 42nd on the Pennsylvania's all-time winners list, Mechanicsburg is the fourth-youngest program to reach its total. In 1986 Mechanicsburg won its first PIAA District 3-AAAA championship. They were also runners-up in 1983 and 2004. Since the influx of the district playoff system in 1982, the Wildcats have qualified for the District 3 playoffs in 9 times (most recently in 2012) and have an overall record of 7-8 in playoff games. The Wildcats appeared in the PIAA AAA State Tournament in 2004 and 2008. Although the Wildcats have never won a PIAA state championship since its implementation in 1988, the program can claim championships in 1924, 1936, 1941 and 1954. In 1995, Mechanicsburg fielded a female kicker, a rarity in American football. On September 21, 2007, Lichtel died after a lengthy battle with prostate cancer. Due to the timing of his hospitalization and passing, current head coach Chris Hakel, a 1986 graduate of the school, and assistant Jeff Costello were named co-head coaches for the remainder of the 2007 season, in which the Wildcats finished 3-7. In April 2008, Lichtel was posthumously inducted into the Pennsylvania Sports Hall of Fame. Hakel (27-28, 2008- ) was hired as full-time head coach in January 2008. Hakel was named Mid-Penn Coach of the Year in 2008 and has made the playoffs three times in five seasons as of 2012 (2-3). As of 2012, Mechanicsburg has had at least one athlete named all-state since the 2008 season; in 2004, Zach Frazer was named Associated Press Pennsylvania Class AAA Player of the Year as one of three Wildcats named to the AP Class AAA All-State team.

The Wildcats play at John H. Frederick Field at Memorial Park Stadium (located in the back of Soldiers and Sailors Memorial Park). In 2008, an artificial turf surface was installed at the facility, financed entirely through private fundraising efforts by the Wildcat Foundation.

=== Baseball ===
The baseball program is considered one of the most storied scholastic baseball clubs in the Central Pennsylvania region. The program has existed since at least 1914 and has won 20 West Shore, CAC or Mid-Penn Conference Championships, with the most recent being in 2009. Since the influx of the PIAA District III Tournament in 1979, Mechanicsburg has made the playoffs 22 times, was district runner-up in 1984 and 1999, and was PIAA District III Champion in 2011. The team has made 3 PIAA State Tournament appearances, having a career record of 1-3 in state tournament play. The team participates in the AAA classification in the PIAA, and competes in the Mid-Penn Keystone Division. Mechanicsburg won the Cumberland Valley Umpires Association "George Wrightstone Sportsmanship Winner" award in 1990, 1991, 1996 and 2001, making Mechanicsburg the only 4-time winner of the award.

In October 2005, the Wildcat baseball family lost 471 win, 32-year head coach Don Shirley to kidney cancer. The Wildcats play at Shirley-Rickenbach Field at Soldiers and Sailors Memorial Park, named after the late Shirley and Bill Rickenbach, present head coach for the Mechanicsburg Cardinals Semi-Pro Twilight League team.

=== Basketball ===
The boys' basketball program is listed in the AAAA classification in the PIAA, and competes in the Mid-Penn Conference's Keystone Division with rivals Cedar Cliff and Red Land. The program has claimed Mid-Penn championships in 1986, 1987, 1994, 1995, 2005, and 2017 and won the PIAA District 3 AAA title in the 1994-1995 season. The program qualified for the PIAA state tournament under the AAA classification in 1995, 2004, 2005, 2006 and again in 2008 under the AAAA classification. They also qualified in 2017 under the AAAAA classification. In the 2007-2008 season, Mechanicsburg had 20 wins and lost in the second round of the PIAA AAAA Tournament. In the 2016-2017 season, Mechanicsburg had 23 wins and lost in the second round of the PIAA AAAA Tournament

The girls' basketball program won Mid-Penn Conference championships in 2000, 2010, 2014, and 2015.

=== Soccer ===
The school's soccer programs are listed in the AAA classification in the PIAA, and compete in the Mid-Penn Keystone Division. The teams play their home games at Northside Elementary's "Cage" on the north side of town, which is one of the few soccer-only stadiums in the area with the capability to host night games.

The boys' program has won Mid-Penn Conference championships in 2006 and 2010, and the girls' team was champion in 2011. The boys' team has qualified for the PIAA District 3 playoffs 16 times, including every season since 1999. The boys' team was PIAA District 3 runners-up in 1986, 1989 and 2005, and the girls were PIAA District 3 runners-up in 2011. The men's advanced to the PIAA state tournament in the 1986, 1989, 2004, 2005, 2006, 2009, 2010 and 2023 seasons. The girls' team advanced to the state tournament in 2010 and 2011. Mechanicsburg has also trained a two-time PARADE High School All-American in Bobby Warshaw, currently with Ängelholms FF, on loan from FC Dallas, and a former Stanford University player.

Both the boys' and girls' soccer teams have gained recognition for their performance in the classroom. In 2006 and 2007, both teams were awarded the National Soccer Coaches Association of America's Team Academic Award for exemplary performance in the classroom. A total of 332 soccer teams from throughout the USA have earned this award. To qualify, the team must have a minimum GPA of 3.25 for the entire academic year. The team GPA is determined by adding every player's GPA, then dividing by the number of players. Mechanicsburg was one of 46 schools receiving the honor for both teams and one of the two schools in PA.

=== Cross country ===
The boys' and girls' Cross Country programs are listed in the AAA classification in the PIAA, and compete in the Mid-Penn Keystone Division. The boys' team won Mid-Penn Conference championships in 1983, 1986, 1988, 2001 and 2005. The team runs meets at Soldier and Sailor Memorial Park. In 2005, the boys finished with a 19–3 record, repeated as the Big Spring Invitational champions, finished second at the Mid-Penn Cross Country Championships, won the Keystone Division title, and attained the highest team finish at the District 3 Championships in school history.

=== Track and field ===
The boys' and girls' Track programs are listed in the AAA classification in the PIAA, and compete in the Keystone Division of the Mid-Penn Conference. The teams run meets at the High School track facility. The girls' team won Mid-Penn Conference championships in 1983, 1994 and 1995. In 2018, the boys team won the Mid-Penn Keystone Division title and the District III AAA title.

=== Swimming and diving ===
The boys' and girls' swimming teams are listed in the AAA classification of the PIAA, and compete in the Mid-Penn Keystone division.

=== Water polo ===
They also the John Quigley Memorial Water Polo Tournament, in honor of a former player John Quigley who died one year after graduating from the team while attending Penn State.

== Alumni ==
The Mechanicsburg Area School District and Mechanicsburg Area Senior High have both a list of distinguished alumni and an active Alumni Association.

=== Notable alumni ===
- Shawn Abner – former Major League Baseball outfielder
- Mike Edwards – former Major League Baseball utility player
- Zach Frazer – former professional football quarterback
- Alexa Gruschow – former professional women's ice hockey player
- Chris Hakel – former professional football quarterback and current coach
- Bret Michaels – the lead singer of the glam metal band Poison
- Andrew Kevin Walker – screenwriter, producer and script doctor
- Bobby Warshaw – former professional soccer player
- Riley Williams – participant of January 6 United States Capitol attack

=== Alumni Association ===
The Mechanicsburg High School Alumni Association was founded in 1883. Its stated mission is to: "The Alumni Association furthers community educational ideals by requesting, procuring, managing, and distributing the funds deemed necessary to meet the Alumni Association's goals. It meets its objectives by assessing the educational and financial needs of the student scholarship applicants; securing gifts, grants, or donations; and giving grants or scholarships to Mechanicsburg High School graduates." The association operates its Hall of Fame, which honors Mechanicsburg graduates who have excelled in high school and beyond in either Service to Humanity, Loyalty to Mechanicsburg High School, Outstanding Achievement in Athletics, and Outstanding Achievement in a Chosen Profession. Currently, there are over 100 inductees since the Hall's foundation in 1967. In addition to the Hall of Fame, the Alumni Association plans and finances its annual Alumni Dinner, which is in its 119th year and the annual Homecoming Party held before the Homecoming football game. In addition, the association operates the Mechanicsburg Alumni Scholarship Fund, which was established in 1980. Since then, the Fund has grown to a value of over $500,000 via donations from alumni worldwide, and is distributed in the form of several annual merit scholarships given to graduating seniors, and one scholarship given to a Mechanicsburg lineman.
