= Scooter Berry =

American football player (born 1986)

No. 95
- Position: Defensive end

Personal information
- Born: June 28, 1986 (age 40); Bay Shore, New York, U.S.
- Listed height: 6 ft 2 in (1.88 m)
- Listed weight: 275 lb (125 kg)

Career information
- High school: North Babylon (NY)
- College: West Virginia
- NFL draft: 2011: undrafted

Career history
- Houston Texans (2011); Jacksonville Sharks (2012); Montreal Alouettes (2012–2013); Orlando Predators (2015)*; Los Angeles KISS (2015); Jacksonville Sharks (2015)
- * Offseason or practice squad member only

Awards and highlights
- Second Team All-Arena (2012); AFL rookie sack record (13); Second-team All-Big East (2010)

Career CFL statistics
- Total tackles: 13
- Sacks: 1
- Fumble recoveries: 1
- Interceptions: 1
- Stats at CFL.ca (archived)

Career AFL statistics
- Total tackles: 44.5
- Sacks: 14
- Forced fumbles: 5
- Fumble recoveries: 4
- Stats at ArenaFan.com
- Stats at Pro Football Reference

Richard "Scooter" Berry (born June 28, 1986) is a former professional football defensive end. He played college football for the West Virginia Mountaineers. He was originally signed by the Houston Texans of the National Football League (NFL).

== Early life ==
Berry attended North Babylon High School, where he played linebacker and fullback as a senior for the 10-1 team. He was an all-Long Island selection while recording 68 tackles and 7 sacks on defense, then rushing for 1,341 career yards and 20 career touchdowns. He was a three-time all-county and two-time all-state selection.

Berry was recruited primarily as a fullback, due to weighing 245 lbs. (which was too small for a traditional defensive lineman and too big for a linebacker). Berry was being offered by Boston College, Central Florida and Connecticut, but eventually signed his letter of intent with West Virginia University.

== Collegiate career ==
=== Freshman season (2006) ===
Berry redshirted his true freshman season of 2006. That season, he won the Danny Van Etten Award for the scout team player of the year on defense along with J.T. Thomas.

=== Redshirt-Freshman season (2007) ===
Berry earned the starting job on the three-man defensive line, along with Keilen Dykes and Johnny Dingle, from the beginning of the season.

Berry finished his freshman season with 27 total tackles, a sack, and 4.5 tackles for a loss. He also forced a fumble and led the team with three fumble recoveries. Berry was named to the rivals.com and collegefootballnews.com Freshman All-American teams at the end of the season.

=== Redshirt-Sophomore season (2008) ===
Berry returned to the three-man defensive line in 2008 as a three-year sophomore and one of the most experienced players on the defense.

Scooter Berry finished the season as a second-team All-Big East selection - totaling 34 tackles, 3.5 sacks, two fumble recoveries, and a forced fumble.

=== Redshirt-Junior season (2009) ===
Berry's Junior season was broken up by a shoulder injury on September 12 in a game against ECU.

=== Redshirt-Senior season (2010) ===
Scooter Berry underwent shoulder surgery in the offseason, and returned for his senior year to make an immediate impact.

Berry finished the season as a second-team All-Big East selection - totaling 35 tackles, 4.5 for a loss, and 4 sacks.

== Professional career ==
After going undrafted in the 2011 NFL draft Berry signed with the Houston Texans, however he was cut before the season started. He then signed with the Jacksonville Sharks of the Arena Football League. During the 2012 season he recorded an AFL rookie record 13 sacks. After the season, he signed with the Montreal Alouettes on September 20, 2012. On March 21, 2015, Berry was traded to the Los Angeles KISS for future considerations. On April 8, 2015, Berry was traded to the Jacksonville Sharks for James McClinton.
