= 2010 Big East Conference football season =

- League: NCAA Division I FBS (Football Bowl Subdivision)
- Sport: football
- Duration: September 2, 2010 through January 8, 2011
- Teams: 8
- TV partner: ESPN-Big East Network

Regular season
- Champions: Connecticut, West Virginia & Pitt

Football seasons
- 2009 2011

2010 Big East Conference football standings
	Conf.			Overall
Team	W		L	W		L
Connecticut $+	5	–	2	8	–	5
West Virginia +	5	–	2	9	–	4
Pittsburgh +	5	–	2	8	–	5
Syracuse	4	–	3	8	–	5
South Florida	3	–	4	8	–	5
Louisville	3	–	4	7	–	6
Cincinnati	2	–	5	4	–	8
Rutgers	1	–	6	4	–	8
$ – BCS representative as conference champion; + – Conference co-champions; Rankings from AP Poll

The 2010 Big East football season was the NCAA football season of the Big East Conference. Conference members began regular-season play on September 2, but did not begin conference play until October 8; the regular season continued through December 4. Following the regular season, six conference teams played in bowl games; although the bowl season concluded with the BCS National Championship Game on January 10, 2011, the last date on which a Big East team played was January 8, when Pittsburgh defeated Kentucky in the BBVA Compass Bowl in Birmingham, Alabama.

The conference consists of 8 football members: Cincinnati, Connecticut, Louisville, Pittsburgh, Rutgers, South Florida, Syracuse, and West Virginia.

The Big East title race came down to the last minute of the final game of the season on December 4 between UConn and South Florida. West Virginia and Pitt had claimed shares of the conference title with wins earlier that day. A UConn win would leave the Huskies tied with WVU and Pitt for the title, but UConn would claim the automatic Big East BCS berth by virtue of victories over both schools. A field goal in the last minute gave the Huskies a 19–16 win and their first-ever trip to a BCS game.

== Previous season ==
Cincinnati (12–1) was the Big East champions and received the conference's automatic bid into the BCS and went to the Sugar Bowl, losing to SEC runner-up Florida, 51–24.

Five other Big East teams went to bowl games in 2010, finishing bowl play with a record of 4–2 as a conference. Rutgers (9–4) beat Central Florida 45–24 in the St. Petersburg Bowl. Pittsburgh (10–3) defeated North Carolina 19–17 in the Meineke Car Care Bowl. West Virginia (9–4) lost to Florida State 33–21 in the Konica-Minolta Gator Bowl. South Florida (8–5) beat Northern Illinois 27–3 in the International Bowl. And, Connecticut (8–5) beat South Carolina 20–7 in the Papajohns.com Bowl. The only two teams not to go to a bowl game were Louisville (4–8) and Syracuse (4–8).

== Preseason ==
=== Coaching changes ===
Three teams have new head coaches for the 2010 season. Charlie Strong replaces Steve Kragthorpe at Louisville, Butch Jones replaces Brian Kelly at Cincinnati, and Skip Holtz replaces Jim Leavitt at South Florida.

=== Preseason poll ===
The 2010 Big East preseason poll was announced at the Big East Media Day in Newport, RI on August 3. Pittsburgh was chosen as the favorite to win the conference.

==== Big East media poll ====
1. Pittsburgh – 190 (22)
2. West Virginia – 142 (1)
3. Cincinnati – 142
4. Connecticut – 131 (1)
5. Rutgers – 99
6. South Florida – 79
7. Syracuse – 41
8. Louisville – 40

=== Award watch lists ===
The following Big East players listed below have been named to the preseason award watch lists.

Johnny Unitas Golden Arm Award:

- Zach Frazer, Connecticut

Lombardi Award:

- Lawrence Wilson, Connecticut
- Jason Pinkston, Pittsburgh
- Greg Romeus, Pittsburgh
- J.T. Thomas, West Virginia

Outland Trophy:

- Zach Hurd, Connecticut
- Jason Pinkston, Pittsburgh
- Art Forst, Rutgers

Rimington Trophy:

- Moe Petrus, Connecticut
- Mario Benevides, Louisville
- Ryan Bartholomew, Syracuse

Bednarik Award:

- Lawrence Wilson, Connecticut
- Greg Romeus, Pittsburgh
- Derrell Smith, Syracuse
- Robert Sands, West Virginia

Maxwell Award:

- Zach Collaros, Cincinnati
- Isaiah Pead, Cincinnati
- Jordan Todman, Connecticut
- Jon Baldwin, Pittsburgh
- Dion Lewis, Pittsburgh
- Tom Savage, Rutgers
- Noel Devine, West Virginia

Walter Camp Award:

- Dion Lewis, Pittsburgh
- Noel Devine, West Virginia

Davey O'Brien Award:

- Zach Collaros, Cincinnati
- Tom Savage, Rutgers

Biletnikoff Award:

- Armon Binns, Cincinnati
- Jon Baldwin, Pittsburgh

Butkus Award:

- Greg Lloyd, Connecticut
- Scott Lutrus, Connecticut
- Lawrence Wilson, Connecticut
- Doug Hogue, Syracuse
- Derrell Smith, Syracuse

Lou Groza Award:

- Dan Hutchins, Pittsburgh
- Tyler Bitancurt, West Virginia

John Mackey Award:

- Ben Guidulgi, Cincinnati
- Ryan Griffin, Connecticut
- Cameron Graham, Louisville
- D.C. Jefferson, Rutgers

Doak Walker Award:

- Jordan Todman, Connecticut
- Victor Anderson, Louisville
- Bilal Powell, Louisville
- Dion Lewis, Pittsburgh
- Noel Devine, West Virginia

Jim Thorpe Award:

- Johnny Patrick, Louisville
- Dom DeCicco, Pittsburgh
- Brandon Hogan, West Virginia
- Robert Sands, West Virginia

== Regular season ==
Index to colors and formatting
Big East member won
Big East member lost
Big East teams in **bold**

All times Eastern time.

Rankings reflect that of the AP poll for that week until week eight when the BCS rankings will be used.

=== Week One ===
Date	Time	Visiting team	Home team	Site	Broadcast	Result	Attendance
September 2	7:30 pm	Norfolk State	**Rutgers**	Rutgers Stadium • Piscataway, NJ	espn3.com	**W** 31–0	46,311
September 2	7:30 pm	No. 15 **Pittsburgh**	Utah	Rice-Eccles Stadium • Salt Lake City, UT	Versus	**L** 24–27^{OT}	45,730
September 4	3:30 pm	**Connecticut**	Michigan	Michigan Stadium • Ann Arbor, MI	ABC	**L** 10–30	113,090
September 4	3:30 pm	Kentucky	**Louisville**	Papa John's Cardinal Stadium • Louisville, KY	ABC	**L** 16–23	55,327
September 4	3:30 pm	Coastal Carolina	No. 25 **West Virginia**	Mountaineer Field • Morgantown, WV	Big East Network	**W** 31–0	57,867
September 4	6:00 pm	**Syracuse**	Akron	InfoCision Stadium • Akron, OH	ESPN3	**W** 29–3	15,969
September 4	7:05 pm	Stony Brook	**South Florida**	Raymond James Stadium • Tampa, FL	ESPN3	**W** 59–14	40,201
September 4	10:00 pm	**Cincinnati**	Fresno State	Bulldog Stadium • Fresno, CA	ESPN2	**L** 14–28	37,238

Players of the week:

Offensive		Defensive		Special teams	
Player	Team	Player	Team	Player	Team
Ryan Nassib	Syracuse	Mike Holmes	Syracuse	Brandon Bing	Rutgers

=== Week Two ===
Date	Time	Visiting team	Home team	Site	Broadcast	Result	Attendance
September 10	7:00 pm	No. 23 **West Virginia**	Marshall	Joan C. Edwards Stadium • Huntington, WV	ESPN2	**W** 24–21^{OT}	41,382
September 11	12:00 pm	**South Florida**	No. 8 Florida	Ben Hill Griffin Stadium • Gainesville, FL	Big East Network	**L** 14–38	90,612
September 11	12:00 pm	Indiana State	**Cincinnati**	Nippert Stadium • Cincinnati, OH	FSOHIO	**W** 40–7	30,807
September 11	12:00 pm	Texas Southern	**Connecticut**	Rentschler Field • East Hartford, CT	Big East Network	**W** 62–3	37,359
September 11	1:00 pm	New Hampshire	**Pittsburgh**	Heinz Field • Pittsburgh, PA	espn3.com	**W** 38–16	50,120
September 11	3:30 pm	Eastern Kentucky	**Louisville**	Papa John's Cardinal Stadium • Louisville, KY	Big East Network	**W** 23–13	51,427
September 11	7:00 pm	**Syracuse**	Washington	Husky Stadium • Seattle, WA	FSN Northwest	**L** 20–41	62,418
September 11	8:00 pm	**Rutgers**	Florida International	FIU Stadium • Miami, FL	Big East Network	**W** 19–14	19,872

Players of the week:

Offensive		Defensive		Special teams	
Player	Team	Player	Team	Player	Team
Noel Devine	West Virginia	Joe Lefeged	Rutgers	Joe Lefeged	Rutgers

=== Week Three ===
Date	Time	Visiting team	Home team	Site	TV	Result	Attendance
September 16	7:30 pm	**Cincinnati**	NC State	Carter–Finley Stadium • Raleigh, NC	ESPN	**L** 19–30	55,934
September 18	12:00 pm	Maryland	**#21 West Virginia**	Mountaineer Field • Morgantown, WV	ESPNU	**W**31–17	60,122
September 18	12:00 pm	**Connecticut**	Temple	Lincoln Financial Field • Philadelphia, PA	Big East Network	**L** 16–30	18,702
September 18	5:30 pm	**Louisville**	No. 25 Oregon State	Reser Stadium • Corvallis, OR	FSN Northwest	**L** 28–35	45,379
September 18	7:15 pm	Maine	**Syracuse**	Carrier Dome • Syracuse, NY		**W** 38–14	37,758

Week off: Pittsburgh, Rutgers, South Florida

Players of the week:

Offensive		Defensive		Special teams	
Player	Team	Player	Team	Player	Team
Geno Smith	West Virginia	Bruce Irvin	West Virginia	Mike Holmes	Syracuse

=== Week Four ===
Date	Time	Visiting team	Home team	Site	TV	Result	Attendance
September 23	7:30 pm	No. 19 Miami	**Pittsburgh**	Heinz Field • Pittsburgh, PA	ESPN	**L** 3–31	58,115
September 25	12:00 pm	Buffalo	**Connecticut**	Rentschler Field • East Hartford, CT	Big East Network	**W** 45–21	36,738
September 25	3:30 pm	Colgate	**Syracuse**	Carrier Dome • Syracuse, NY	Espn3.com	**W** 42–7	38,068
September 25	3:30 pm	North Carolina	**Rutgers**	Rutgers Stadium • Piscataway, NJ	ESPNU	**L** 13–17	52,038
September 25	6:00 pm	No. 8 Oklahoma	**Cincinnati**	Paul Brown Stadium • Cincinnati,	ESPN 2	**L** 29–31	58,253
September 25	7:00 pm	Western Kentucky	**South Florida**	Raymond James Stadium • Tampa, FL	Big East Network	**W** 24–12	40,206
September 25	9:00 pm	No. 22 **West Virginia**	No. 15 LSU	Tiger Stadium • Baton Rouge, LA	ESPN 2	**L** 14–20	92,575

Week off: Louisville

Players of the week:

Offensive		Defensive		Special teams	
Player	Team	Player	Team	Player	Team
Delone Carter	Syracuse	Sio Moore	Connecticut	Terrence Mitchell	South Florida

=== Week Five ===
Date	Time	Visiting team	Home team	Site	TV	Result	Attendance
October 2	12:00 pm	Vanderbilt	**Connecticut**	Rentschler Field • East Hartford, CT	Big East Network	**W** 40–21	40,000
October 2	2:00 pm	Tulane	**Rutgers**	Rutgers Stadium • Piscataway, NJ	Espn3.com	**L** 14–17	47,963
October 2	3:30 pm	Florida International	**Pittsburgh**	Heinz Field • Pittsburgh, PA	Espn3.com	**W** 44–17	45,207
October 2	7:00 pm	**Louisville**	Arkansas State	ASU Stadium • Jonesboro, AR	Espn3.com	**W** 34–24	25,219
October 2	7:05 pm	Florida Atlantic	**South Florida**	Raymond James Stadium • Tampa, FL	Espn3.com	**W** 31–3	38,434

Week off: Cincinnati, Syracuse, West Virginia

Players of the week:

Offensive		Defensive		Special teams	
Player	Team	Player	Team	Player	Team
Ray Graham	Pittsburgh	Blidi Wreh-Wilson	Connecticut	Dan Hutchins	Pittsburgh

=== Week Six ===
Date	Time	Visiting team	Home team	Site	TV	Result	Attendance
October 8	7:30 pm	**Connecticut**	**Rutgers**	Rutgers Stadium • Piscataway, NJ	ESPN	**RUT** 27–24	48,431
October 9	12:00 pm	**Syracuse**	**South Florida**	Raymond James Stadium • Tampa, FL	Big East Network	**SYR** 13–9	41,917
October 9	2:00 pm	Memphis	**Louisville**	Papa John's Cardinal Stadium • Louisville, KY	ESPN3.com	**W** 56–0	48,427
October 9	3:30 pm	**Pittsburgh**	Notre Dame	Notre Dame Stadium • South Bend, IN	NBC	**L** 17–23	80,795
October 9	3:30 pm	UNLV	**West Virginia**	Mountaineer Field • Morgantown, WV	Big East Network	**W** 49–10	58,234
October 9	7:00 pm	Miami (OH)	**Cincinnati**	Nippert Stadium • Cincinnati, OH	ESPN3.com	**W** 45–3	33,909

Players of the week:

Offensive		Defensive		Special teams	
Player	Team	Player	Team	Player	Team
Chas Dodd	Rutgers	Max Suter	Syracuse	San San Te	Rutgers

=== Week Seven ===
Date	Time	Visiting team	Home team	Site	TV	Result	Attendance
October 14	7:30 pm	**South Florida**	No. 25 **West Virginia**	Mountaineer Field • Morgantown, WV	ESPN	**WV** 20–6	54,955
October 15	8:00 pm	**Cincinnati**	**Louisville**	Papa John's Cardinal Stadium • Louisville, KY	ESPN	**CIN** 35–27	55,106
October 16	12:00 pm	**Pittsburgh**	**Syracuse**	Carrier Dome • Syracuse, NY	Big East Network	**PITT** 45–15	40,168
October 16	2:00 pm	Army	**Rutgers**	New Meadowlands Stadium • East Rutherford, N.J.	ESPN3.com	**RUT** 23–20^{OT}	41,292

Week off: Connecticut

Players of the week:

Offensive		Defensive		Special teams	
Player	Team	Player	Team	Player	Team
Armon Binns	Cincinnati	Keith Tandy	West Virginia	Dan Hutchins	Pittsburgh

=== Week Eight ===
Date	Time	Visiting team	Home team	Site	TV	Result	Attendance
October 22	7:30 pm	**South Florida**	**Cincinnati**	Nippert Stadium • Cincinnati, OH	ESPN2	**USF** 38–30	32,670
October 23	12:00 pm	**Rutgers**	**Pittsburgh**	Heinz Field • Pittsburgh, PA	Big East Network	**PITT** 41–21	50,425
October 23	12:00 pm	**Syracuse**	No. 20 **West Virginia**	Mountaineer Field • Morgantown, WV	ESPN2	**SYR** 19–14	58,122
October 23	3:30 pm	**Connecticut**	**Louisville**	Papa John's Cardinal Stadium • Louisville, KY	ESPNU	**LOU** 26–0	48,591

Players of the week:

Offensive		Defensive		Special teams	
Player	Team	Player	Team	Player	Team
B.J. Daniels	South Florida	Doug Hogue	Syracuse	Chris Philpott	Louisville

=== Week Nine ===
Date	Time	Visiting team	Home team	Site	TV	Result	Attendance
October 29	8:00 pm	**West Virginia**	**Connecticut**	Rentschler Field • East Hartford, CT	ESPN2	**CONN** 16–13^{OT}	40,000
October 30	12:00 pm	**Syracuse**	**Cincinnati**	Nippert Stadium • Cincinnati, OH	ESPNU	**SYR** 31–7	32,072
October 30	12:00 pm	**Louisville**	**Pittsburgh**	Heinz Field • Pittsburgh, PA	Big East Network	**PITT** 20–3	48,562

Week off: Rutgers, South Florida

Players of the week:

Offensive		Defensive		Special teams	
Player	Team	Player	Team	Player	Team
Jordan Todman	Connecticut	Sio Moore	Connecticut	Dave Teggart	Connecticut

=== Week Ten ===
Date	Time	Visiting team	Home team	Site	TV	Result	Attendance
November 3	7:00 pm	**Rutgers**	**South Florida**	Raymond James Stadium • Tampa, FL	ESPN2	**USF** 28–27	39,465
November 6	12:00 pm	**Louisville**	**Syracuse**	Carrier Dome • Syracuse, NY	Big East Network	**LOU** 28–20	40,735

Week off: Cincinnati, Connecticut, Pittsburgh, West Virginia

Players of the week:

Offensive		Defensive		Special teams	
Player	Team	Player	Team	Player	Team
Jeremy Wright	Louisville	Jacquain Williams	South Florida	Maikon Bonani	South Florida

=== Week Eleven ===
Date	Time	Visiting team	Home team	Site	TV	Result	Attendance
November 11	7:30 pm	**Pittsburgh**	**Connecticut**	Rentschler Field • East Hartford, CT	ESPN	**CONN 30–28**	35,391
November 13	12:00 pm	**Cincinnati**	**West Virginia**	Mountaineer Field • Morgantown, WV	Big East Network	**WVU 37–10**	56,593
November 13	12:00 pm	**South Florida**	**Louisville**	Papa John's Cardinal Stadium • Louisville, KY	ESPNU	**USF 24–21**^{OT}	43,887
November 13	3:30 pm	**Syracuse**	**Rutgers**	Rutgers Stadium • Piscataway, NJ	ESPNU	**SYR 13–10**	49,911

Players of the week:

Offensive		Defensive		Special teams	
Player	Team	Player	Team	Player	Team
Geno Smith	West Virginia	Lawrence Wilson	Connecticut	Ross Krautman	Syracuse

=== Week Twelve ===
Date	Time	Visiting team	Home team	Site	TV	Result	Attendance
November 20	12:00 pm	**West Virginia**	**Louisville**	Papa John's Cardinal Stadium • Louisville, KY	Big East Network	**WVU 17–10**	51,772
November 20	12:00 pm	**Pittsburgh**	**South Florida**	Raymond James Stadium • Tampa, FL	ESPN2	**PITT 17–10**	43,844
November 20	7:00 pm	**Connecticut**	**Syracuse**	Carrier Dome • Syracuse, NY	ESPNU	**CONN 23–6**	41,465
November 20	7:30 pm	**Rutgers**	**Cincinnati**	Nippert Stadium • Cincinnati, OH	Big East Network	**CIN 69–38**	30,265

Players of the week:

Offensive		Defensive		Special teams	
Player	Team	Player	Team	Player	Team
Isaiah Pead	Cincinnati	Brandon Mills	Cincinnati	Gregg Pugnetti	West Virginia

=== Week Thirteen ===
Date	Time	Visiting team	Home team	Site	TV	Result	Attendance
November 26	11:00 am	**Louisville**	**Rutgers**	Rutgers Stadium • Piscataway, NJ	ESPN2	**LOU 40–13**	37,422
November 26	12:00 pm	**West Virginia**	**Pittsburgh**	Heinz Field • Pittsburgh, PA	ABC	**WVU 35–10**	60,562
November 27	12:00 pm	**Cincinnati**	**Connecticut**	Rentschler Field • East Hartford, CT	Big East Network	**CONN 38–14**	40,000
November 27	12:00 pm	Boston College	**Syracuse**	Carrier Dome • Syracuse, NY	ESPN2	**L 7–16**	42,191
November 27	12:00 pm	**South Florida**	Miami (FL)	Sun Life Stadium • Miami Gardens, FL	ESPNU	**W 23–20**^{OT}	41,148

Players of the week:

Offensive		Defensive		Special teams	
Player	Team	Player	Team	Player	Team
Jordan Todman	Connecticut	Brandon Hogan	West Virginia	Justin Brockhaus-Kann	South Florida

=== Week Fourteen ===
Last week's results set up a wild final week in the Big East, with three teams—UConn, WVU, and Pitt—still in contention for the league's BCS berth, and a possibility that as many as five teams (the three aforementioned teams plus South Florida and Syracuse) could claim a share of the conference title. The conference noted in a November 29 press release, "There could be an outright winner, three different two-way ties, a three-way tie, or even a five-way tie for the title."

Under Big East rules, the first tiebreaker is head-to-head results. In a multi-team tie, the first tiebreaker is record in games between the teams involved in the tie.

Going into the final games, the scenarios were:

- If UConn defeated South Florida, it would claim the BCS berth regardless of any other results. The Huskies held the tiebreaker in any potential two-way or three-way tie with wins over both Pitt and WVU.
- If the Huskies lost, WVU would claim the BCS berth with a win over Rutgers, as the Mountaineers held the tiebreaker over Pitt due to their win last week.
- Pitt could only claim the BCS berth with a win over Cincinnati plus losses by UConn and WVU.
- If all three teams lost, it would have created a five-way tie for the conference crown between them, USF, and Syracuse. In that event, UConn would have claimed the BCS berth as the only team with a 3–1 record in games between the five teams.

With Pitt and WVU both winning, they assured themselves a share of the Big East title. The BCS berth came down to the UConn-South Florida game, which itself went down to the final minute. Dave Teggart's 52-yard field goal, the longest of his career, with 17 seconds remaining gave the Huskies their first-ever BCS berth.

Date	Time	Visiting team	Home team	Site	TV	Result	Attendance
December 4	12:00 pm	**Pittsburgh**	**Cincinnati**	Nippert Stadium • Cincinnati, OH		**PITT 28–10**	
December 4	8:00 pm	**Connecticut**	**South Florida**	Raymond James Stadium • Tampa, FL	ESPN2	**UCONN 19–16**	
December 4	12:00 pm	**Rutgers**	No. 24 **West Virginia**	Mountaineer Field • Morgantown, WV	ABC	**WVU 35–14**	

Week off: Louisville, Syracuse

Players of the week:

Offensive		Defensive		Special teams	
Player	Team	Player	Team	Player	Team
Dion Lewis	Pittsburgh	J.T. Thomas	West Virginia	David Teggart	Connecticut

== Rankings ==
Legend
	Improvement in ranking
	Drop in ranking
	Not ranked previous week
RV	Received votes but were not ranked in Top 25 of poll

Ranking Movement
		Pre	Wk 1	Wk 2	Wk 3	Wk 4	Wk 5	Wk 6	Wk 7	Wk 8	Wk 9	Wk 10	Wk 11	Wk 12	Wk 13	Wk 14	Wk 15	Final
Cincinnati	AP	RV	RV	–	–	–	–	–	–	–	–	–	–	–	–	–	–	
Cincinnati	C	RV	RV	RV	–	–	–	–	–	–	–	–	–	–	–	–	–	
Cincinnati	BCS	Not released								–	–	–	–	–	–	–	–	
Connecticut	AP	RV	–	–	–	–	–	–	–	–	–	–	–	–	–	RV	25	
Connecticut	C	RV	RV	RV	–	–	–	–	–	–	–	–	–	–	–	–	RV	
Connecticut	BCS	Not released								–	–	–	–	–	–	–	–	
Louisville	AP	–	–	–	–	–	–	–	–	–	–	–	–	–	–	–	–	
Louisville	C	–	–	–	–	–	–	–	–	–	–	–	–	–	–	–	–	
Louisville	BCS	Not released								–	–	–	–	–	–	–	–	
Pittsburgh	AP	15	RV	RV	RV	–	–	–	–	–	–	RV	RV	–	–	–	RV	
Pittsburgh	C	15	RV	RV	RV	–	–	–	–	–	–	–	RV	–	RV	–	–	
Pittsburgh	BCS	Not released								–	–	–	–	–	–	–	–	
Rutgers	AP	–	–	–	–	–	–	–	–	–	–	–	–	–	–	–	–	
Rutgers	C	–	–	–	–	–	–	–	–	–	–	–	–	–	–	–	–	
Rutgers	BCS	Not released								–	–	–	–	–	–	–	–	
South Florida	AP	–	–	–	–	–	–	–	–	–	–	–	–	–	–	–	–	
South Florida	C	RV	RV	–	–	–	–	–	–	–	–	–	–	–	–	RV	–	
South Florida	BCS	Not released								–	–	–	–	–	–	–	–	
Syracuse	AP	–	–	–	–	–	–	–	–	–	RV	RV	RV	RV	–	–	–	
Syracuse	C	–	–	–	–	–	–	–	–	–	RV	RV	–	RV	–	–	–	
Syracuse	BCS	Not released								–	–	–	–	–	–	–	–	
West Virginia	AP	25	23	21	22	RV	25	20	25	20	RV	–	–	–	RV	23	22	
West Virginia	C	24	22	21	21	RV	25	19	25	20	RV	–	–	–	RV	24	21	
West Virginia	BCS	Not released								20	–	–	–	–	–	24	22	

== Records against other conferences ==
Conference	Wins	Losses
ACC	2	4
Big 12	0	1
Big Ten	0	1
CUSA	3	1
Independents	1	1
MAC	3	1
Mountain West	1	1
Pac-10	0	2
SEC	1	3
Sun Belt	5	0
WAC	0	1
All FCS	9	0
Against BCS	3	11
Against FBS	16	16
Overall	25	16

== Bowl games ==
Bowl Game	Date	Stadium	City	Television	Matchups/Results	Attendance	Payout (US$)
Beef 'O' Brady's Bowl	December 21, 2010	Tropicana Field	St. Petersburg, FL	ESPN	Louisville 31, Southern Miss 28	20,017	$1,000,000
Champs Sports Bowl	December 28, 2010	Florida Citrus Bowl	Orlando, FL	ESPN	NC State 23, West Virginia 7	48,962	$2,125,000
Pinstripe Bowl	December 30, 2010	Yankee Stadium	Bronx, NY	ESPN	Syracuse 36, Kansas State 34	38,274	$2,000,000
Meineke Car Care Bowl	December 31, 2010	Bank of America Stadium	Charlotte, NC	ESPN	South Florida 31, Clemson 26	41,122	$1,000,000
BBVA Compass Bowl	January 8, 2011	Legion Field	Birmingham, AL	ESPN	Pittsburgh 27, Kentucky 10		$900,000
Fiesta Bowl	January 1, 2011	University of Phoenix Stadium	Glendale, AZ	ESPN	Oklahoma 48, Connecticut 20	67,232	$17,000,000

== Attendance ==
Team	Stadium (Capacity)	Game 1	Game 2	Game 3	Game 4	Game 5	Game 6	Game 7	Total	Average	% of Capacity
Cincinnati	Nippert Stadium (35,098)	30,807	58,253^{§}	33,909	32,670	32,072	30,265	27,496	245,472	35,067	88.9
Connecticut	Rentschler Field (40,000)	37,359	36,738	40,000	40,000	35,391	40,000	–	229,488	38,248	95.6
Louisville	Papa John's Cardinal Stadium (57,000)	55,327	51,427	48,427	55,106	48,591	43,887	51,772	354,537	50,648	88.9
Pittsburgh	Heinz Field (65,050)	50,120	58,115	45,207	50,425	48,562	60,562	–	312,911	52,165	80.2
Rutgers	Rutgers Stadium (52,454)	46,311	52,038	47,963	48,431	41,292^{†}	49,911	37,422	323,368	46,195	88.1
South Florida	Raymond James Stadium (65,857)	40,201	40,206	38,434	41,917	39,465	43,844	41,809	285,876	40,839	62.0
Syracuse	Carrier Dome (49,250)	37,758	38,068	40,168	40,735	41,465	42,191	–	240,385	40,064	81.3
West Virginia	Mountaineer Field (60,000)	57,867	60,122	58,234	54,955	58,122	56,593	48,386	394,279	56,326	93.9

^{§}Played at Paul Brown Stadium
^{†}Played at New Meadowlands Stadium

== Awards and honors ==
=== Big East Conference awards ===
The following individuals received postseason honors as voted by the Big East Conference football coaches.

2010 Big East football individual awards
Award	Recipient(s)
Offensive Player of the Year	Jordan Todman^{†}, RB, CONNECTICUT
Defensive Player of the Year	Jabaal Sheard, DE, PITTSBURGH
Special Teams Player of the Year	Lindsey Lamar, KR, SOUTH FLORIDA
Rookie of the Year	Hakeem Smith, S, LOUISVILLE
Coach of the Year	Randy Edsall, CONNECTICUT; Charlie Strong, LOUISVILLE
^{†} - denotes unanimous selection

Todman, who became the second Connecticut running back to win the award in three years, was the unanimous choice for Offensive Player of the Year. He was the first unanimous winner of the award since Gino Torretta in 1992. Sheard marked the third consecutive year, and fourth time in five years, that a Pittsburgh player has won the defensive player award.

2010 All-Big East Conference football teams
First-team		Second-team	
Offense	Defense	Offense	Defense
QB – Zach Collaros^{†}, JR, CINCINNATI; RB – Jordan Todman^{†}, JR, CONNECTICUT; RB – Bilal Powell, SR, LOUISVILLE; WR – Armon Binns, SR, CINCINNATI; WR – Jon Baldwin, JR, PITTSBURGH; TE – Cameron Graham, JR, LOUISVILLE; OT – Mike Ryan, JR, CONNECTICUT; OT – Jason Pinkston, SR, PITTSBURGH; OG – Zach Hurd^{†}, SR, CONNECTICUT; OG – Mark Wetterer^{†}, SR, LOUISVILLE; C – Sampson Genus, SR, SOUTH FLORIDA; K – Dave Teggart, JR, CONNECTICUT; RS – Lindsey Lamar, SO, SOUTH FLORIDA	DL – Kendall Reyes, JR, CONNECTICUT; DL – Jabaal Sheard^{†}, SR, PITTSBURGH; DL – Terrell McClain, SR, SOUTH FLORIDA; DL – Chris Neild, SR, WEST VIRGINIA; LB – Lawrence Wilson, SR, CONNECTICUT; LB – Doug Hogue, SR, SYRACUSE; LB – J. T. Thomas, SR, WEST VIRGINIA; CB – Johnny Patrick, SR, LOUISVILLE; CB – Keith Tandy, JR, WEST VIRGINIA; S – Dom DeCicco, SR, PITTSBURGH; S – Robert Sands, JR, WEST VIRGINIA; P – Dan Hutchins, SR, PITTSBURGH	QB – Geno Smith, SO, WEST VIRGINIA; RB – Isaiah Pead, JR, CINCINNATI; RB – Delone Carter, SR, SYRACUSE; WR – D. J. Woods, JR, CINCINNATI; WR – Dontavia Bogan, SR, SOUTH FLORIDA; WR – Tavon Austin, SO, WEST VIRGINIA; WR – Jock Sanders, SR, WEST VIRGINIA; TE – Benjamin Guidugli, SR, CINCINNATI; OT – Justin Pugh, SO, SYRACUSE; OT – Don Barclay, JR, WEST VIRGINIA; OL – Jason Kelce, JR, CINCINNATI; OL – Byron Stingily, SR, LOUISVILLE; OL – Jacob Sims, SR, SOUTH FLORIDA; C – Moe Petrus, JR, CONNECTICUT; K – Ross Krautman, FR, SYRACUSE; RS – Nick Williams, SO, CONNECTICUT	DL – Brandon Lindsey, JR, PITTSBURGH; DL – Chandler Jones, JR, SYRACUSE; DL – Scooter Berry, SR, WEST VIRGINIA; DL – Bruce Irvin, JR, WEST VIRGINIA; LB – J. K. Schaffer, JR, CINCINNATI; LB – Jacquian Williams, SR, SOUTH FLORIDA; LB – Derrell Smith, SR, SYRACUSE; CB – Mistral Raymond, SR, SOUTH FLORIDA; CB – Brandon Hogan, SR, WEST VIRGINIA; S – Hakeem Smith, FR, LOUISVILLE; S – Jared Holley, SO, PITTSBURGH; S – Joe Lefeged, SR, RUTGERS; P – Rob Long, SR, SYRACUSE
^{†} - denotes unanimous selection
