= Robert Sands (American football) =

American gridiron football player (born 1989)

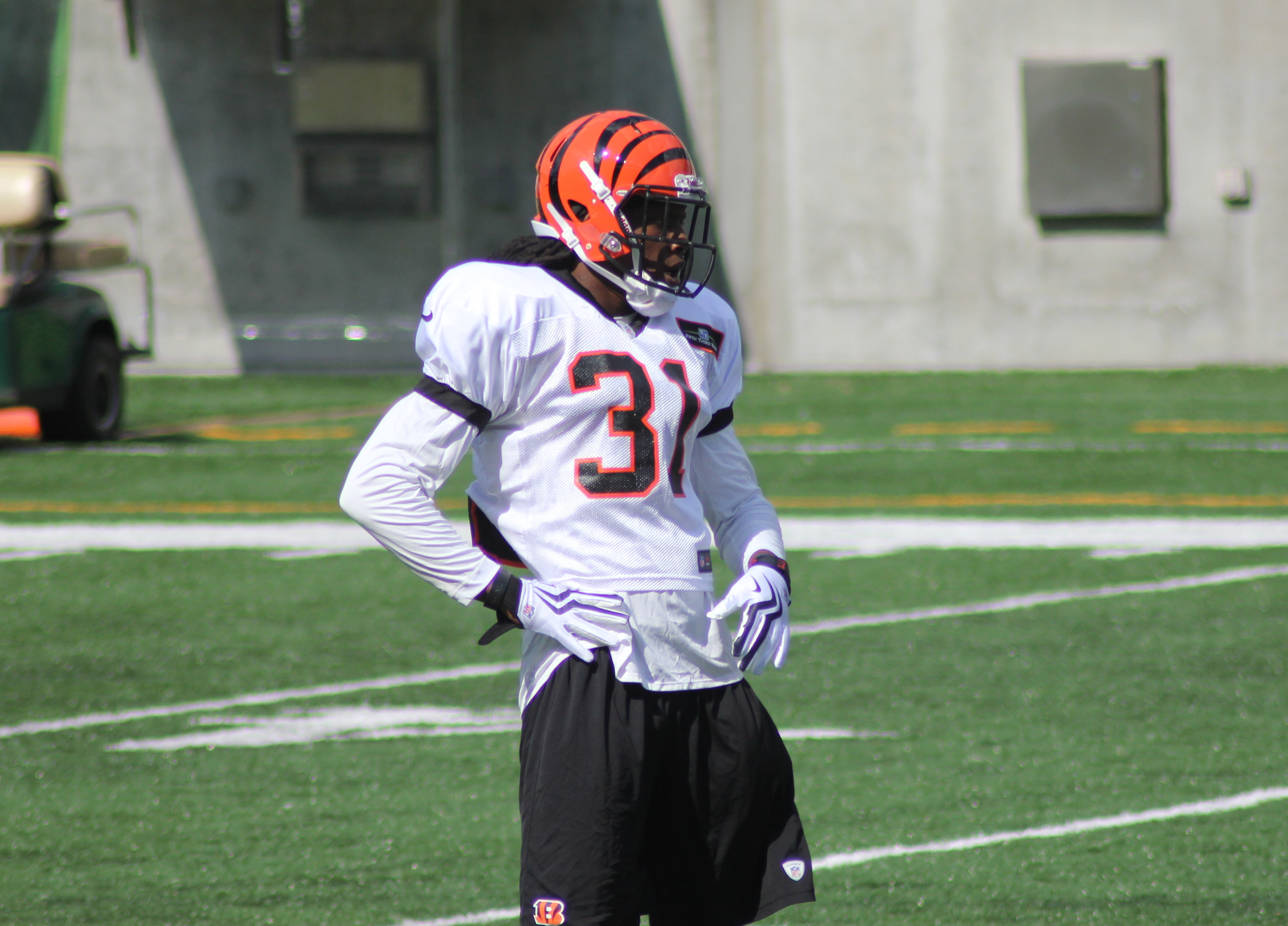
- Sands with the Cincinnati Bengals in 2012

No. 29, 31, 4
- Position: Safety

Personal information
- Born: November 3, 1989 (age 37); Jacksonville, Florida, U.S.
- Listed height: 6 ft 4 in (1.93 m)
- Listed weight: 215 lb (98 kg)

Career information
- High school: Miami Carol City (Miami Gardens, Florida)
- College: West Virginia
- NFL draft: 2011: 5th round, 134th overall pick

Career history
- Cincinnati Bengals (2011–2012); Edmonton Eskimos (2014); Saskatchewan Roughriders (2016)*; Los Angeles KISS (2016)*; Columbus Lions (2018); West Virginia Roughriders (2019)
- * Offseason or practice squad member only

Awards and highlights
- First-team All-American (2010); First-team All-Big East (2010)
- Stats at Pro Football Reference
- Stats at CFL.ca (archive)

Robert Sands (born November 3, 1989) is an American former professional football player who was a safety in the National Football League (NFL). He was selected by the Cincinnati Bengals in the fifth round of the 2011 NFL draft. He played college football for the West Virginia Mountaineers.

== College career ==
Sands played college football for the West Virginia Mountaineers. After his junior season, Sands announced that he would forgo his senior season and enter the 2011 NFL draft.

== Professional career ==
Pre-draft measurables
Height	Weight	Arm length	Hand span	Wingspan	40-yard dash	10-yard split	20-yard split	20-yard shuttle	Three-cone drill	Vertical jump	Broad jump	Bench press
6 ft 4 3/8 in (1.94 m)	217 lb (98 kg)	33 3/8 in (0.85 m)	9 3/4 in (0.25 m)	6 ft 7 1/2 in (2.02 m)	4.61 s	1.61 s	2.69 s	4.06 s	7.03 s	35.0 in (0.89 m)	10 ft 4 in (3.15 m)	12 reps
All values from NFL Combine

=== Cincinnati Bengals ===
Sands was selected by the Cincinnati Bengals in the fifth round with the 134th overall pick in the 2011 NFL draft. He agreed to terms on a rookie contract on July 29. On December 4, 2011, Sands made his debut against the Pittsburgh Steelers but did not record any stats. He was placed on injured reserve on August 24, 2012, due to a chest injury. The Bengals released him on June 12, 2013.

=== Saskatchewan Roughriders ===
On January 29, 2016, Sands signed with the Saskatchewan Roughriders of the Canadian Football League. On April 19, 2016, Sands was released.

=== Los Angeles KISS ===
On May 26, 2016, Sands was assigned to the Los Angeles KISS. On June 14, 2016, Sands was placed on reassignment.

=== Columbus Lions ===
On August 30, 2017, Sands signed with the Columbus Lions.

=== West Virginia Roughriders ===
On November 13, 2018, Sands signed with the West Virginia Roughriders of the American Arena League.

== Arrest ==
In January 2013, Sands was arrested and charged with assault in the fourth degree in a domestic violence incident against his 8 month pregnant wife.
