= Jason Pinkston =

American football player (born 1987)

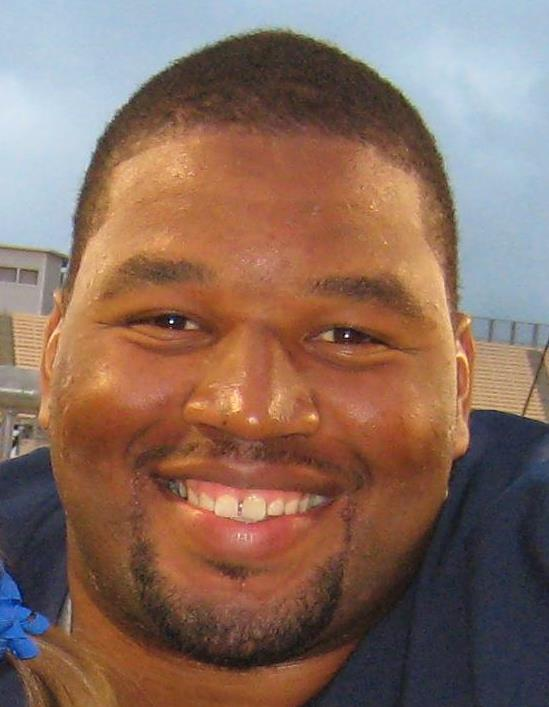
- Pinkston at Pitt in 2010

No. 62
- Position: Offensive guard

Personal information
- Born: September 5, 1987 (age 39); Pittsburgh, Pennsylvania, U.S.
- Listed height: 6 ft 4 in (1.93 m)
- Listed weight: 305 lb (138 kg)

Career information
- High school: Baldwin (Pittsburgh)
- College: Pittsburgh
- NFL draft: 2011: 5th round, 150th overall pick

Career history
- Cleveland Browns (2011–2013)

Awards and highlights
- Second-team All-American (2009); First-team All-Big East (2010)

Career NFL statistics
- Games played: 25
- Games started: 24
- Stats at Pro Football Reference

Jason R. Pinkston (born September 5, 1987) is an American former professional football player who played his entire career as an offensive guard for the Cleveland Browns of the National Football League (NFL). He played college football for the Pittsburgh Panthers. He is also the cousin of Todd Pinkston, a former NFL wide receiver.

== College career ==
During his junior year at the University of Pittsburgh season in 2009, Pinkston was named first-team All-Big East and a second-team All-American by SI.com and Rivals.com. During his senior season in 2010, he was named to the Lombardi Award and Outland Trophy watch lists. As a 2011 NFL draft prospect, Pinkston was considered one of the best offensive linemen in the 2010 senior class.

== Professional career ==
Pre-draft measurables
| Height | Weight | Arm length | Hand span | Wingspan | 40-yard dash | 10-yard split | 20-yard split | 20-yard shuttle | Three-cone drill | Vertical jump | Broad jump | Bench press |
|---|---|---|---|---|---|---|---|---|---|---|---|---|
| 6 ft 3 3/8 in (1.91 m) | 317 lb (144 kg) | 34 in (0.86 m) | 10 1/4 in (0.26 m) | 6 ft 9 7/8 in (2.08 m) | 5.28 s | 1.82 s | 3.03 s | 4.91 s | 7.88 s | 26.5 in (0.67 m) | 8 ft 2 in (2.49 m) | 22 reps |
All values from NFL Combine/Pro Day

Pinkston was selected in the fifth round (150th overall) of the 2011 NFL draft by the Cleveland Browns. Pinkston started all 16 games for the Cleveland Browns as a rookie after guard Eric Steinbach was injured in training camp. Pinkston started the 2012 season as the Browns starting left guard, but was injured during the regular season and was found to have a blood clot in his lung, the Browns placed him on injured reserve. He reached an injury settlement with the Browns on August 5, 2014, stating his intention to retire because of recent health issues.
