= Gavin Heslop =

American gridiron football player (born 1997)

Profile
- Position: Defensive back

Personal information
- Born: November 13, 1997 (age 28); Yonkers, New York, U.S.
- Listed height: 6 ft 0 in (1.83 m)
- Listed weight: 197 lb (89 kg)

Career information
- High school: Archbishop Stepinac (White Plains, New York)
- College: Stony Brook (2015–2019)
- NFL draft: 2020: undrafted

Career history
- Seattle Seahawks (2020–2021); New York Giants (2022)*; Carolina Panthers (2022)*; Cleveland Browns (2023)*; Houston Roughnecks (2024)*; San Antonio Brahmas (2024); Ottawa Redblacks (2025)
- * Offseason or practice squad member only

Awards and highlights
- Second-team All-CAA (2018); Third-team All-CAA (2019)

Career NFL statistics
- Games played: 3
- Total tackles: 1
- Stats at Pro Football Reference
- Stats at CFL.ca

Gavin Heslop (born November 13, 1997) is an American professional football defensive back. Heslop played college football at Stony Brook.

== Early life ==
Heslop was born in Yonkers, New York. He attended Archbishop Stepinac High School in White Plains, New York, the same high school as his future college teammates including quarterback Tyquell Fields and cornerback TJ Morrison. Heslop was named to the NYSSWA First-team All-New York State, as well as the USA Today All-New York team. Heslop played a large role in Stepinac's 2014 CHSFL AAA championship team, the school's first since 1955, recording 60 tackles, three interceptions and three sacks a senior while rushing for 440 yards and six touchdowns. In 2014, Heslop also had a 68-yard interception returned for a touchdown to help Stepinac defeat rival St. Anthony's High School for the first time since 1983.

== College career ==
Heslop redshirted during the 2015 season. During his freshman season in 2016, he played in eight games and recorded 13 total tackles. In his college debut on September 1 against No. 19 North Dakota, Heslop blocked a punt in the fourth quarter that was returned for a touchdown, giving Stony Brook the 13–9 victory. Heslop also recorded six tackles in a 42–14 upset of No. 2 Richmond.

In his 2017 sophomore season, Heslop started all 13 games at cornerback. He set career highs with 72 tackles, including 8.5 tackles for loss. Heslop recorded his first career sack and forced fumble on October 14 against No. 12 New Hampshire. Heslop recorded a career-high 12 tackles in a 59–29 victory over Lehigh in the first round of the 2017 FCS Playoffs. The following week against James Madison in the second round, Heslop recorded another 10 tackles in a 26–7 loss.

Heslop again started all 12 games at cornerback as a junior in 2018. He was named to the Second-team All-Colonial Athletic Association (CAA) after a season with 59 tackles, 38 of which being solo tackles. On September 22 against Richmond, Heslop recovered a fumble and returned it 87 yards for a touchdown. It was Heslop's first career touchdown and Stony Brook's first fumble recovery for a touchdown since 2016.

Prior to his senior season, Heslop was named one of three Stony Brook team captains. Heslop started all 12 games in 2019, ending his Stony Brook career having started 37 consecutive games. He was named to the Third-team All-CAA with 52 tackles, 8.5 tackles for loss, two blocked kicks, three forced fumbles, three fumble recoveries and one fumble recovery for a touchdown.

== Professional career ==
Pre-draft measurables
Height	Weight	Arm length	Hand span	40-yard dash	10-yard split	20-yard split	20-yard shuttle	Three-cone drill	Vertical jump	Broad jump	Bench press
6 ft 0 3/8 in (1.84 m)	197 lb (89 kg)	32 in (0.81 m)	9 1/4 in (0.23 m)	4.58 s	1.53 s	2.57 s	4.18 s	6.88 s	34.5 in (0.88 m)	10 ft 7 in (3.23 m)	12 reps
All values from Pro Day

=== Seattle Seahawks ===
==== 2020 ====
Heslop signed with the Seattle Seahawks following the 2020 NFL draft as an undrafted free agent. He missed most of training camp with an injury. He was waived during final roster cuts on September 5, 2020, and signed to the practice squad the next day. Heslop was elevated to the active roster on October 3 for the team's week 4 game against the Miami Dolphins, and reverted to the practice squad after the game. On January 11, 2021, Heslop signed a reserve/futures contract with the Seahawks.

==== 2021 ====
In the first week of preseason during the 2021 season, Heslop played 33 snaps, including 12 on special teams. He was waived on August 31, 2021 and re-signed to the practice squad. Heslop was elevated to the active roster on November 20 and made his NFL debut on November 21 against the Arizona Cardinals, playing four snaps on special teams. On Monday Night Football against the Washington Football Team on November 29, Heslop recovered an onside kick with Seattle down 17–15, but the play was called back due to an illegal formation penalty on another Seahawks player. He was signed to the active roster on December 10 after Jamal Adams was ruled out for the season.

On December 12 against the Houston Texans, Heslop suffered a broken fibula and tibia in the final minute of the game after coming in to take his first career regular season defensive snaps. He remained in Houston to receive surgery the next day, which head coach Pete Carroll described as "successful". He was placed on injured reserve on December 15.

=== New York Giants ===
On July 22, 2022, the New York Giants signed Heslop. He was released on August 16.

=== Carolina Panthers ===
On October 19, 2022, the Carolina Panthers signed Heslop to their practice squad.

=== Cleveland Browns ===
On August 5, 2023, Heslop signed with the Cleveland Browns. He was waived on August 27.

=== Houston Roughnecks ===
On October 24, 2023, Heslop signed with the Houston Roughnecks of the XFL. The Roughnecks brand was transferred to the Houston Gamblers when the XFL and United States Football League merged to create the United Football League (UFL).

=== San Antonio Brahmas ===
On January 19, 2024, Heslop signed with the San Antonio Brahmas of the UFL. He was placed on injured reserve on March 22. Heslop was activated on April 30. He was released by the Brahmas on May 14.

=== Ottawa Redblacks ===
Heslop was signed by the Ottawa Redblacks on November 18, 2024. He was part of the final training camp cuts on May 31, 2025. Heslop was later re-signed on June 17, to the team's practice roster. Heslop dressed in his first CFL game on June 29, against the Toronto Argonauts, where he had one special teams tackle. He was released on January 23, 2026.

== Personal life ==
Heslop is cousins with former NFL player Doug Hogue, who played for the Detroit Lions and the Carolina Panthers from 2011 to 2012.
