= Doug Hogue =

American football player (born 1989)

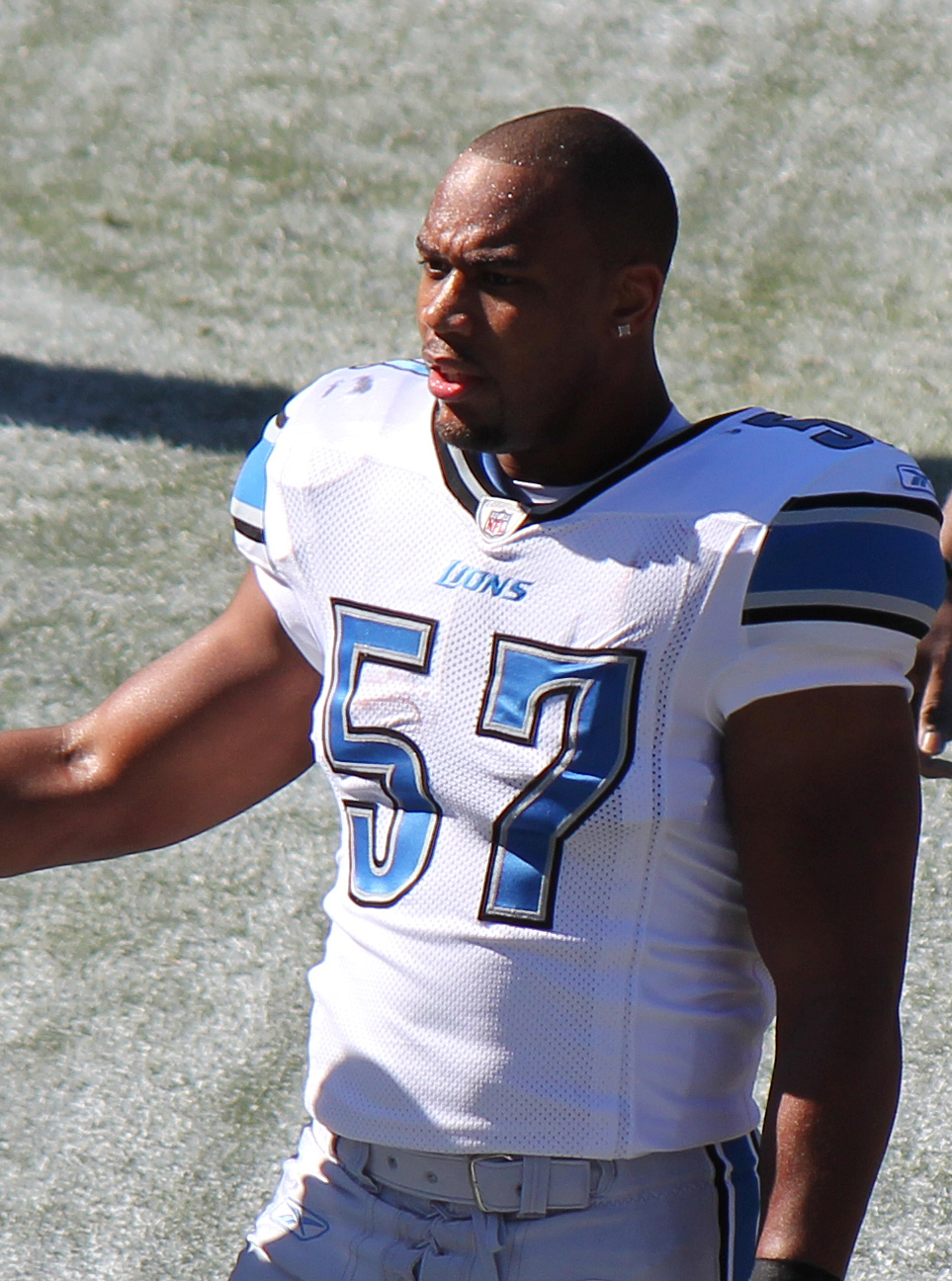
- Hogue with the Detroit Lions in 2011

No. 57, 55
- Position: Linebacker

Personal information
- Born: February 1, 1989 (age 37); Yonkers, New York, U.S.
- Listed height: 6 ft 2 in (1.88 m)
- Listed weight: 226 lb (103 kg)

Career information
- High school: Roosevelt (Yonkers)
- College: Syracuse
- NFL draft: 2011: 5th round, 157th overall pick

Career history
- Detroit Lions (2011–2012); Carolina Panthers (2012); Winnipeg Blue Bombers (2014)*
- * Offseason or practice squad member only

Awards and highlights
- First-team All-Big East (2010)

Career NFL statistics
- Total tackles: 14
- Stats at Pro Football Reference

Douglas K. Hogue (born February 1, 1989) is an American former professional football player who was a linebacker in the National Football League (NFL). He played college football for the Syracuse Orange. He was selected by the Detroit Lions in the fifth round of the 2011 NFL draft.

== Professional career ==
Pre-draft measurables
Height	Weight	Arm length	Hand span	Wingspan	40-yard dash	10-yard split	20-yard split	20-yard shuttle	Three-cone drill	Vertical jump	Broad jump	Bench press
6 ft 2 1/2 in (1.89 m)	235 lb (107 kg)	32 5/8 in (0.83 m)	9 3/8 in (0.24 m)	6 ft 4 in (1.93 m)	4.61 s	1.66 s	2.65 s	4.57 s	7.09 s	36.0 in (0.91 m)	10 ft 1 in (3.07 m)	18 reps
All values from NFL Combine/Pro Day

=== Detroit Lions ===
Hogue was selected by the Detroit Lions in the fifth round of the 2011 NFL draft with the 157th overall pick., He spent his rookie season primarily playing special teams.

=== Carolina Panthers ===
After Week 7 of the 2012 season, Hogue was waived by the Lions and subsequently claimed by the Carolina Panthers. He attended the Panthers' training camp in 2013, but was released during final cuts.

=== Winnipeg Blue Bombers ===
Hogue was later signed by the Winnipeg Blue Bombers on January 17, 2014, but was cut during training camp on April 17.

== Coaching career ==
On July 14, 2026, Hogue was announced as the coach of the Yonkers Guardians, a high school varsity football team representing all the schools in the Yonkers School District. The Guardians were formed due to the remaining two Yonkers high schools that offered varsity football incurring a lack of players to field individual teams.

== Personal life ==
Hogue's younger brother, Dustin, is a professional basketball player. He played college basketball for Iowa State. He now plays internationally for BC Enisey of the VTB United League.

Hogue's cousin Gavin Heslop was previously a cornerback for the Seattle Seahawks.
