= Cheta Ozougwu =

American football player (born 1988)

- Ozougwu with the Bears in 2013

No. 95
- Position: Linebacker

Personal information
- Born: January 4, 1988 (age 38); Houston, Texas, U.S.
- Listed height: 6 ft 2 in (1.88 m)
- Listed weight: 255 lb (116 kg)

Career information
- High school: Alief Taylor (Houston)
- College: Rice
- NFL draft: 2011: 7th round, 254th overall pick

Career history
- Houston Texans (2011); Chicago Bears (2012–2013); New Orleans Saints (2014)

Awards and highlights
- First-team All-C USA (2010, 2011)

Career NFL statistics
- Total tackles: 9
- Sacks: 1.0
- Forced fumbles: 1
- Stats at Pro Football Reference

Chetachi Ozougwu // (born January 4, 1988) is an American former professional football player who was a linebacker in the National Football League (NFL). He played college football for the Rice Owls and was selected with the final pick of the seventh round of the 2011 NFL draft by the Houston Texans. He was also a member of the New Orleans Saints and Chicago Bears.

== Early life ==
Ozougwu graduated from Alief Taylor High School. Ozougwu was selected to the All-District 18-5A and All Greater Houston teams, All-Academic District and Texas top 100 list. Ozougwu finished his senior year with 117 tackles, 19 tackles for a loss and 5 sacks. Ozougwu was selected to the 2007 Texas vs Louisiana All-Star game. Also lettered in track and basketball.

== College career ==
He played college football for the Rice Owls while amassing 197 total tackles and 11 sacks. In 2007, he earned Freshman All-American honors from The Sporting News and C-USA Honors. He received numerous athletic and academic awards during his time at Rice University. He was named to the ESPN Academic All-District VI Football Team in 2010, after posting a 3.41 GPA while majoring in Economics. He was one of 30 student-athletes in the country selected for the Lowe’s Senior CLASS Award. He was named to the Arthur Ashe Sports Scholar Award 2nd Team and the Allstate AFCA Good Works Team in 2010. He was also named to the Commissioners Honor Roll each year at Rice. As a senior at Rice University, he received the Outstanding Senior Award presented by the Rice Student Association for service, leadership, and academic achievement.

== Professional career ==
Pre-draft measurables
Height	Weight	Arm length	Hand span	Wingspan	40-yard dash	10-yard split	20-yard split	20-yard shuttle	Three-cone drill	Vertical jump	Broad jump	Bench press
6 ft 1 5/8 in (1.87 m)	247 lb (112 kg)	31 in (0.79 m)	9 3/8 in (0.24 m)	6 ft 2 7/8 in (1.90 m)	4.90 s	1.69 s	2.80 s	4.31 s	7.06 s	34.5 in (0.88 m)	9 ft 11 in (3.02 m)	26 reps
All values from NFL Combine

=== Houston Texans ===
He was selected with the last pick in the seventh round of the 2011 NFL draft by the Houston Texans, making him Mr. Irrelevant. On August 15, 2011, he made his first appearance in an NFL preseason game against the New York Jets on Monday Night Football.

=== Chicago Bears ===
On April 11, 2012, Ozougwu signed with the Bears. During his preseason debut against the Denver Broncos, Ozougwu sacked former Bear Caleb Hanie, though the Broncos would go on to win 31–3. Ozougwu had an impressive preseason by leading the Bears in sacks during the 2012 preseason with three making the 53 man roster. On April 15, 2014, Ozougwu was waived. He appeared in nine games over the past two seasons, recording 9 tackles, one sack, one tackle-for-loss, one forced fumble and five special teams tackles. Ozougwu registered 6 tackles, 1 sack and 1 forced fumble during the 2013 season.

=== New Orleans Saints ===
On May 18, 2014, Ozougwu signed a contract with the New Orleans Saints. On July 23, 2014, the Saints placed Ozougwu on injured reserve with an undisclosed injury. In March 2015, the Saints decided to part ways with Ozougwu after he failed his season ending physical with an undisclosed injury.
