= Johnny Patrick =

American gridiron football player (born 1988)

No. 32, 26
- Position: Cornerback

Personal information
- Born: August 17, 1988 (age 38); DeLand, Florida, U.S.
- Listed height: 5 ft 11 in (1.80 m)
- Listed weight: 190 lb (86 kg)

Career information
- High school: DeLand (FL)
- College: Louisville
- NFL draft: 2011: 3rd round, 88th overall pick

Career history
- New Orleans Saints (2011−2012); San Diego Chargers (2013); New York Jets (2014)*; Winnipeg Blue Bombers (2016)*
- * Offseason or practice squad member only

Awards and highlights
- First-team All-Big East (2010)

Career NFL statistics
- Total tackles: 68
- Sacks: 1.5
- Forced fumbles: 1
- Pass deflections: 4
- Interceptions: 1
- Stats at Pro Football Reference

Johnny Patrick (born August 17, 1988) is an American former professional football player who was a cornerback in the National Football League (NFL). He was selected by the New Orleans Saints in the third round of the 2011 NFL draft. He played college football for the Louisville Cardinals.

== Early life ==
Patrick was born in DeLand, Florida and attended DeLand High School.

== College career ==
Patrick played college football for the Louisville Cardinals from 2007–2010. He was the starting cornerback from 2008 to 2010. In 2009 Patrick recorded 53 tackles and two interceptions. In the 2010 Beef 'O' Brady's Bowl, Patrick forced a fumble and blocked a field goal to help the Cardinals win against Southern Miss.

== Professional career ==
=== Pre-draft ===
Pre-draft measurables
Height	Weight	Arm length	Hand span	Wingspan	40-yard dash	10-yard split	20-yard split	20-yard shuttle	Vertical jump	Broad jump	Bench press
5 ft 10 5/8 in (1.79 m)	191 lb (87 kg)	30 in (0.76 m)	8 1/4 in (0.21 m)	6 ft 1 1/8 in (1.86 m)	4.48 s	1.57 s	2.62 s	4.16 s	32.0 in (0.81 m)	9 ft 2 in (2.79 m)	13 reps
All values from NFL Combine/Pro Day

Patrick was projected to be a second-third round pick in the 2011 NFL draft.

=== New Orleans Saints ===
Patrick was selected by the New Orleans Saints in the third round (88th overall) of the 2011 NFL draft. He was cut by the Saints on February 19, 2013.

=== San Diego Chargers ===
Patrick was signed by the San Diego Chargers on February 20, 2013. He eventually played in 13 games, playing the nickel and slot, while starting 4. He set career highs with 38 total tackles, 1 interception, 1.5 sack, along with a forced fumble and 2 passes defended. He was released on March 4, 2014.

=== New York Jets ===
Patrick was acquired off waivers by the New York Jets on March 5, 2014. He was released on August 30, 2014.

=== Winnipeg Blue Bombers ===
On March 22, 2016, the Winnipeg Blue Bombers of the Canadian Football League signed Patrick to a contract. He was released before the start of the season on June 15, 2016.
