= Mistral Raymond =

American football player (born 1987)

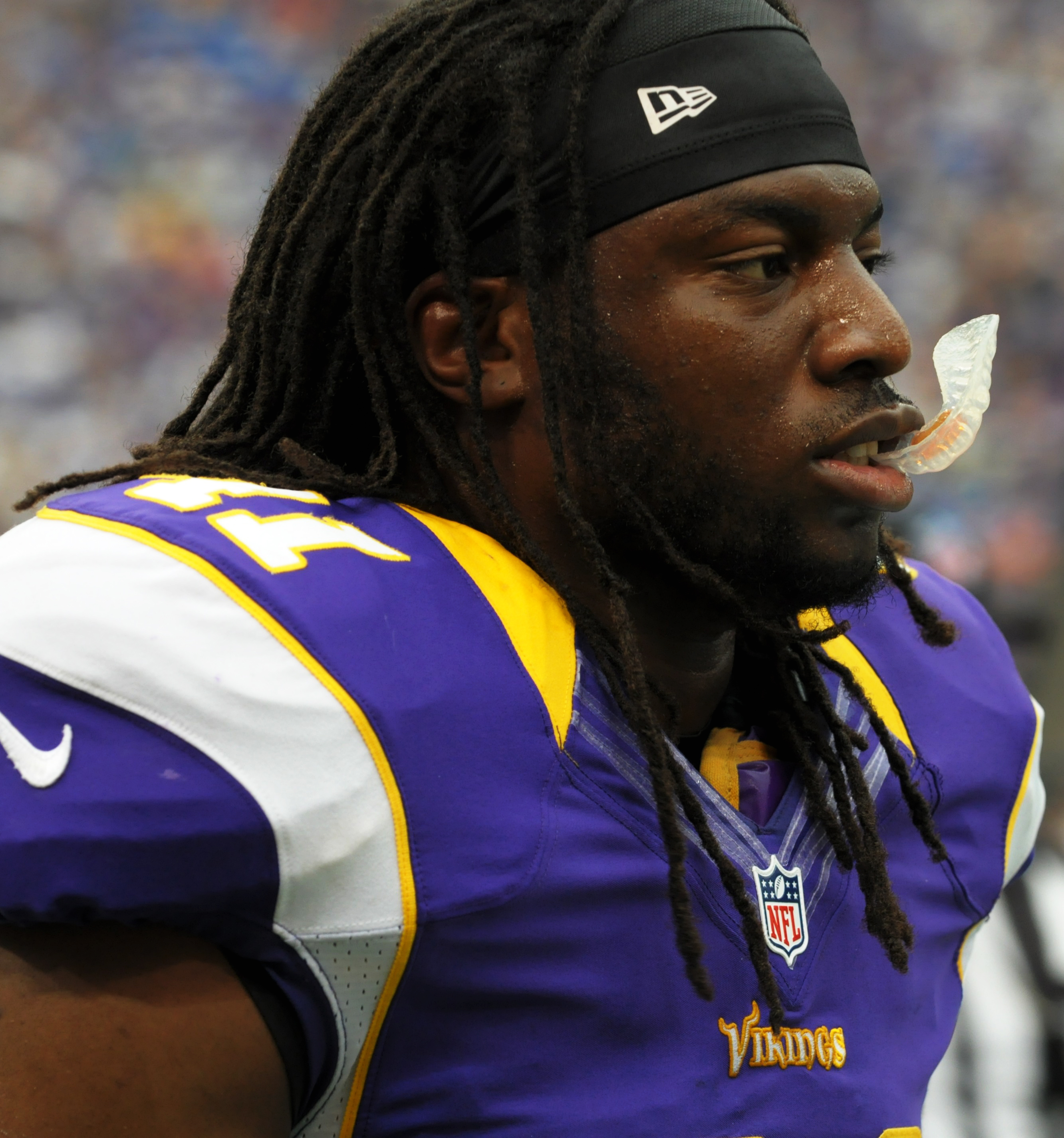
- Raymond with the Minnesota Vikings in 2012

No. 41
- Position: Safety

Personal information
- Born: September 7, 1987 (age 39); Palmetto, Florida, U.S.
- Listed height: 6 ft 1 in (1.85 m)
- Listed weight: 202 lb (92 kg)

Career information
- High school: Palmetto
- College: South Florida
- NFL draft: 2011: 6th round, 170th overall pick

Career history
- Minnesota Vikings (2011–2014)

Awards and highlights
- Second-team All-Big East (2010)

Career NFL statistics
- Total tackles: 53
- Fumble recoveries: 1
- Pass deflections: 6
- Interceptions: 1
- Stats at Pro Football Reference

Mistral Raymond (born September 7, 1987) is an American former professional football player who was a safety in the National Football League (NFL). He played college football for the South Florida Bulls and was selected by the Minnesota Vikings in the sixth round of the 2011 NFL draft.

== College career ==
Raymond began his collegiate career at Ellsworth Community College in Iowa Falls, Iowa. In the 2010 season, he was selected to the All-BIG East second-team while at the University of South Florida.

== Professional career ==
Pre-draft measurables
| Height | Weight | 40-yard dash | 10-yard split | 20-yard split | 20-yard shuttle | Three-cone drill | Vertical jump | Broad jump | Bench press |
|---|---|---|---|---|---|---|---|---|---|
| 6 ft 1 1/4 in (1.86 m) | 194 lb (88 kg) | 4.64 s | 1.59 s | 2.59 s | 4.51 s | 7.14 s | 32.5 in (0.83 m) | 10 ft 2 in (3.10 m) | 8 reps |
All values from Pro Day

Raymond was selected by the Minnesota Vikings with the 170th overall pick in the sixth round of the 2011 NFL draft.
