= 2011 NFL draft =

2011 American football draft

2011 NFL Draft

General information
- Date: April 28–30, 2011
- Time: 8:00 pm EDT (April 28); 6:00 pm EDT (April 29); Noon EDT (April 30)
- Location: Radio City Music Hall in New York City, New York
- Networks: ESPN, NFL Network

Overview
- 254 total selections in 7 rounds
- League: NFL
- First selection: Cam Newton, QB; Carolina Panthers
- Mr. Irrelevant: Cheta Ozougwu, DE; Houston Texans
- Most selections (12): Washington Redskins
- Fewest selections (5): Chicago Bears; Detroit Lions; Indianapolis Colts; Jacksonville Jaguars

The 2011 NFL draft was the 76th annual NFL draft, where the franchises of the National Football League select newly eligible football players. Like the 2010 draft, the 2011 draft was held at Radio City Music Hall in New York City, New York, over three days: this year, the first round took place on Thursday, April 28, 2011; the second and third rounds took place on Friday, April 29; with the final four rounds on Saturday, April 30, 2011. The Carolina Panthers, who had the worst record for the 2010 NFL season at 2–14, had the right to the first selection in the draft, where they selected Auburn University quarterback Cam Newton, who was the 2010 Heisman Trophy winner. The 2011 draft is regarded as one of the most talented draft classes in NFL history, as 12 of the first 16 players have been selected to at least one Pro Bowl.

A second Heisman Trophy winner, running back Mark Ingram II from Alabama was selected by New Orleans late in the first round. This was the eleventh draft which included multiple Heisman winners, and the first time ever that it has occurred in consecutive drafts (Sam Bradford and Tim Tebow in 2010). Five of the first six picks played college football in the Southeastern Conference (SEC). For the second consecutive year—and the third time in NFL history—the top two selections of the draft won Offensive and Defensive Rookie of the Year awards, respectively. The top two picks in the draft, Cam Newton and Denver linebacker Von Miller, played against each other in Super Bowl 50 on the teams that drafted them. This marked the first time that the top two picks in a single draft faced each other in the Super Bowl. The Broncos won, with Miller winning Super Bowl MVP.

Teams were allowed ten minutes to make each selection in the first round, seven minutes per selection in the second round and five minutes in each of the subsequent rounds. The time allotment ran out for the Baltimore Ravens on their first-round pick, allowing the Kansas City Chiefs to move up to the 26th pick and dropping the Ravens to the 27th. Numerous draft prospects displayed Hall of Fame level talent throughout their careers, including three-time Defensive Player of the Year J. J. Watt, 2015 NFL MVP Cam Newton, Super Bowl 50 MVP Von Miller, 2015 and 2018 receiving yards leader Julio Jones, and perennial All-Pro players such as Richard Sherman, A. J. Green, Tyron Smith, Jason Kelce, Cameron Jordan, Cameron Heyward and Patrick Peterson.

As of 2025, the only remaining active players from the 2011 class in the NFL are the aforementioned Miller, Jordan, and Heyward, as well as Eagles quarterback Andy Dalton and Packers quarterback Tyrod Taylor.

The following is the breakdown of the 254 players selected by position:

- 39 cornerbacks
- 32 linebackers
- 28 wide receivers
- 27 defensive ends
- 24 running backs
- 22 offensive tackles
- 17 defensive tackles
- 14 safeties
- 13 guards
- 12 quarterbacks
- 12 tight ends
- 6 centers
- 6 fullbacks
- 1 placekicker
- 1 punter

== Impact of labor situation ==
Despite an ongoing labor dispute between league owners and players over a new collective bargaining agreement (CBA), a provision in the expired CBA ensured that this draft would still take place, despite the fact that the owners had imposed a lockout to prevent the start of the league year. Fans in attendance at the draft expressed their displeasure with the lockout by booing NFL commissioner Roger Goodell during the event and chanting "We want football."

Due to the labor situation and the lockout, franchises were not able to trade players for draft selections (trades involving only selections were permitted), and were unable to sign or even contact drafted or undrafted players until the lockout was lifted. Because of the lockout, the Panthers could not sign or even negotiate with their first draft pick before the draft began, as other teams have done in years past.

The restriction on trading players extended to players selected in this draft—teams were unable to swap any player once selected, e.g. as happened in 2004 when the San Diego Chargers and New York Giants completed a draft day trade involving Eli Manning and Philip Rivers who had been selected first and fourth respectively. In addition, with no agreement in place between owners and players mandating future drafts, teams were advised by the league that any trades involving future draft picks would be made at the teams' "own risk". This warning did not dissuade several teams from making trades involving future selections.

The National Football League Players Association (NFLPA) considered plans to dissuade potential prospects from attending the draft, but a record 25 potential draftees attended the event, including Von Miller, who was one of the named plaintiffs in the players' antitrust lawsuit against the league.

The 2011 CBA reduced salaries for first-round picks by implementing a rookie wage scale. The rookie contracts for first-round picks were set for four years each, with a fifth-year option available after the 2013 season.

== Early entrants ==
A record 56 underclassmen announced their intention to forgo their remaining NCAA eligibility and declare themselves eligible to be selected in the draft. Of the 56 eligible underclassmen, 43 (or 76.8%) were drafted.

The selection of Newton, a junior, marked the third straight draft where the first overall selection was an underclassman. Since non-seniors were first eligible to be drafted in 1990, fourteen first overall picks (including six of the last seven) have been players who have entered the draft early. Eight of the first ten players chosen in this draft were non-seniors, which broke the record of six set in 1997 and matched in 2006. Jake Locker and Von Miller were the only two seniors among the first ten draftees.

== Determination of draft order ==
The draft order is based generally on each team's record from the previous season, with teams which qualified for the postseason selecting after those which failed to make the playoffs.

== Player selections ==
*	compensatory selection
^	supplemental compensatory selection
†	Pro Bowler (Note: Players are identified as a Pro Bowler if they were selected for the Pro Bowl at any time in their career.)

Positions key
Offense	Defense	Special teams
QB — Quarterback; RB — Running back; FB — Fullback; WR — Wide receiver; TE — Tight end; OL — Offensive lineman; T — Tackle; G — Guard; C — Center	DL — Defensive lineman; DT — Defensive tackle (Note: Includes nose tackle (NT)); DE — Defensive end; EDGE — Edge rusher; LB — Linebacker (Note: Includes middle linebacker (MLB/MIKE), weakside linebacker (WILL), strongside linebacker (SAM), off-ball linebacker, and outside linebacker (OLB)); DB — Defensive back; CB — Cornerback; S — Safety (Note: Includes free safety (FS) and strong safety (SS))	K — Kicker (Note: Also known as a placekicker (PK)); P — Punter; LS — Long snapper; RS — Return specialist (Note: Includes kickoff and punt returners)

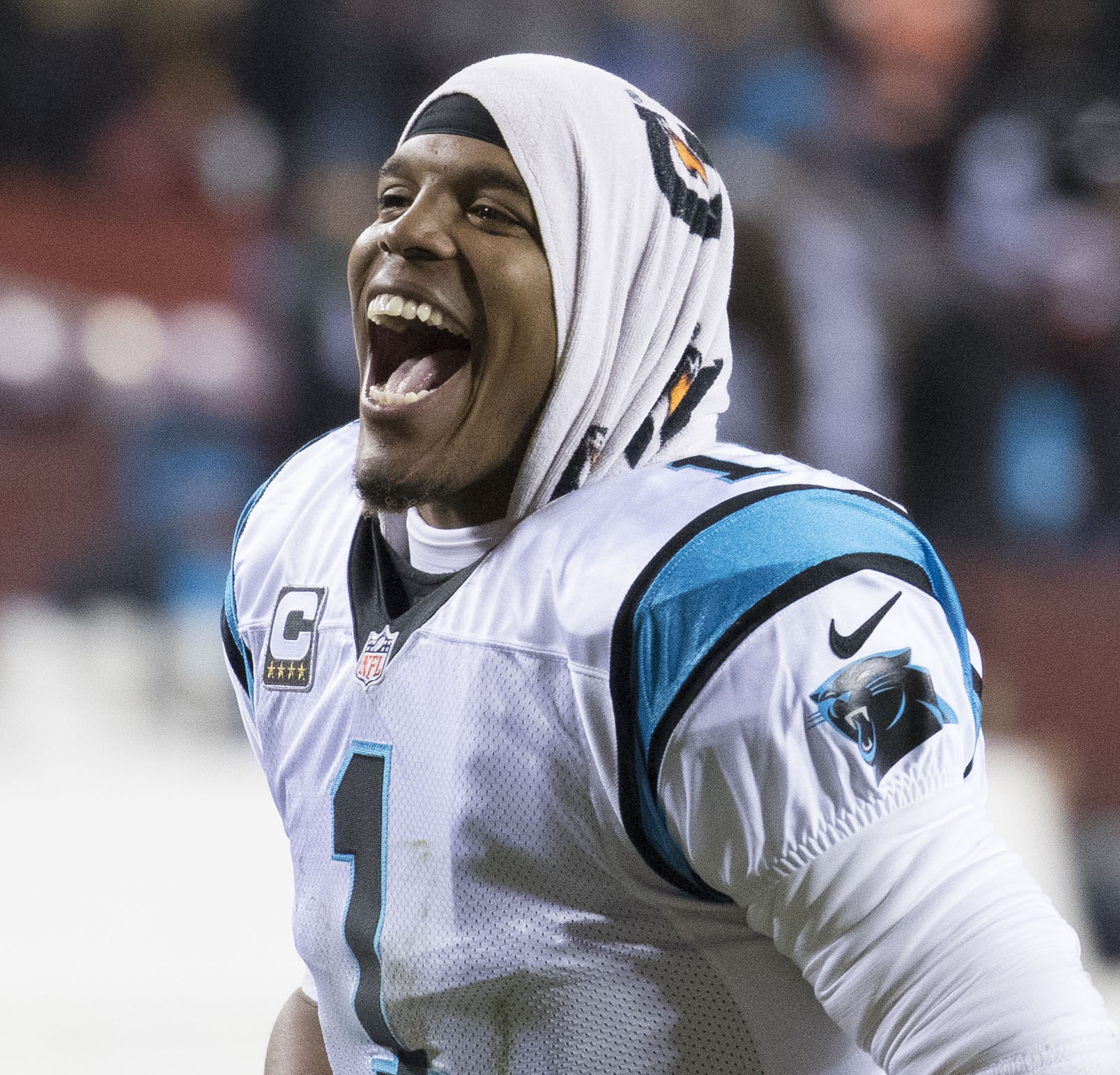
The 2015 MVP Cam Newton was drafted first overall by the Carolina Panthers.

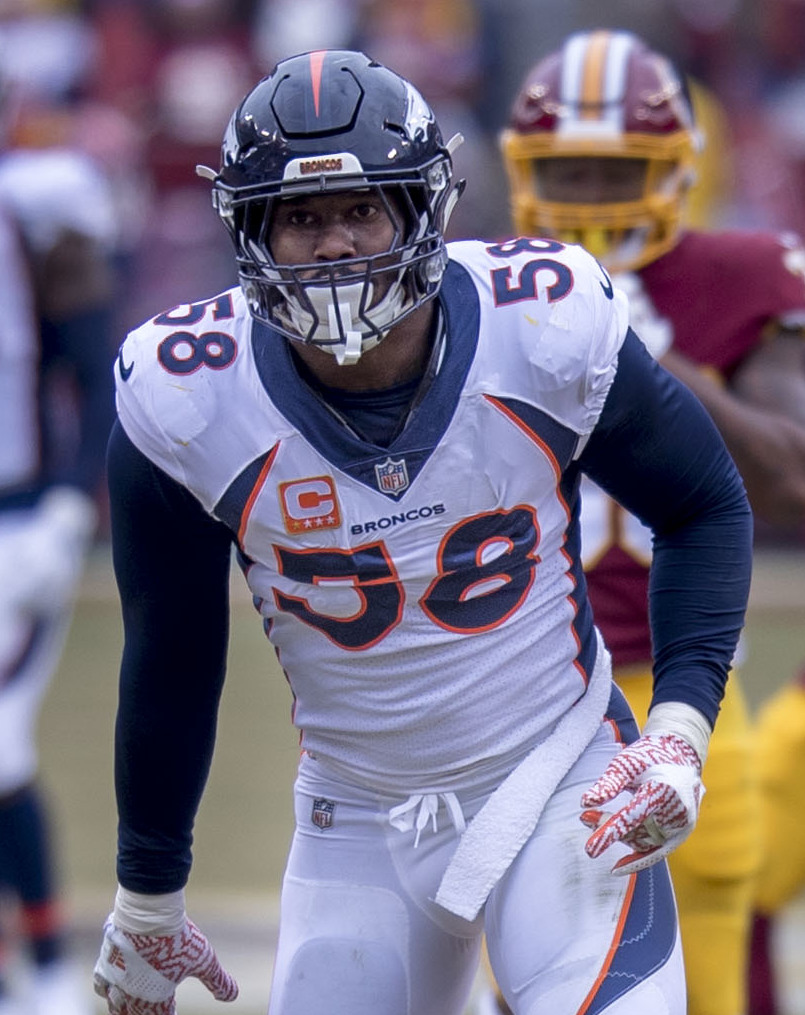
Super Bowl 50 MVP Von Miller, who also led all players in sacks during the 2010s, was drafted second

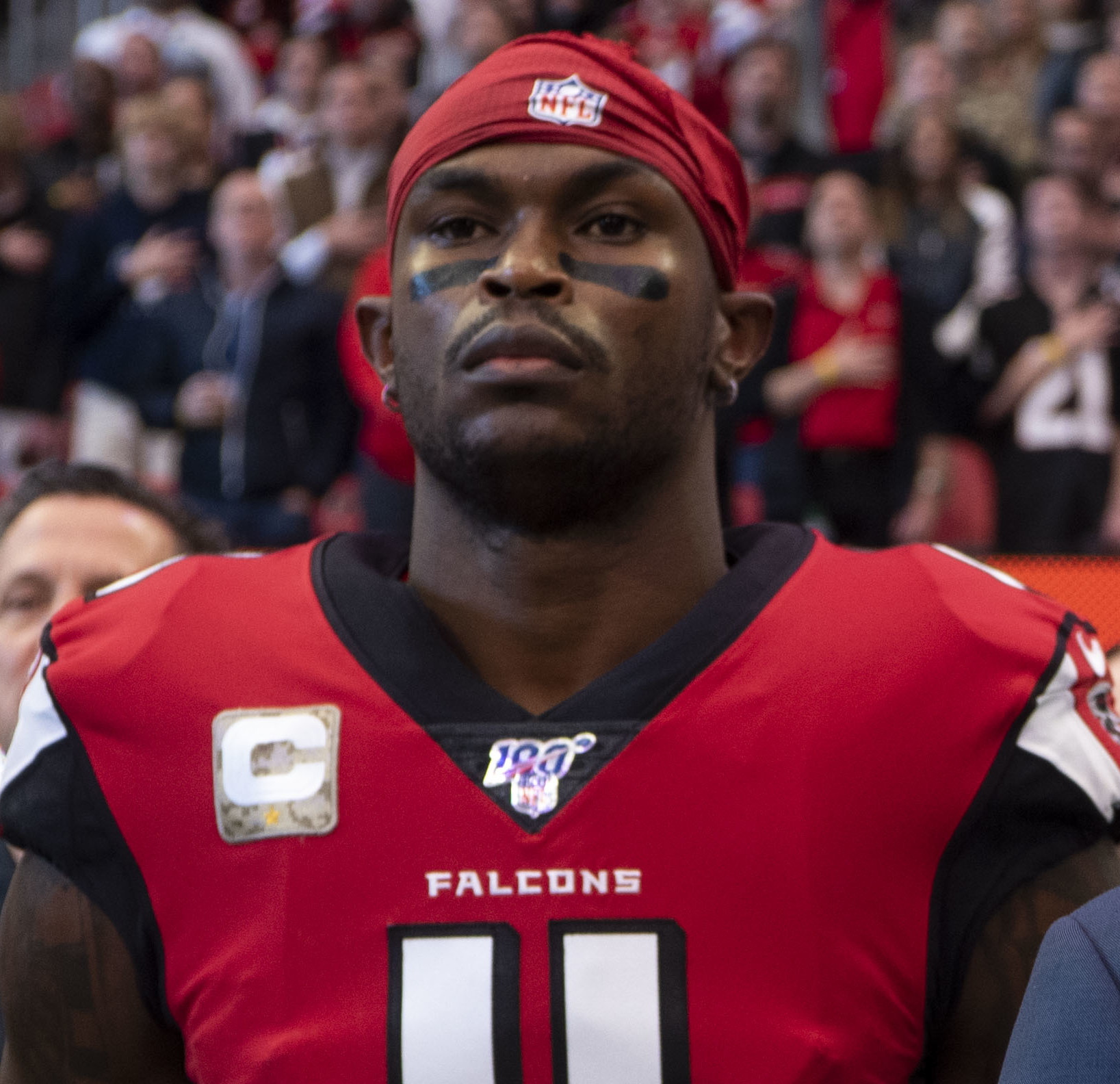
Julio Jones led the league in receiving yards twice and was selected to seven Pro Bowls.

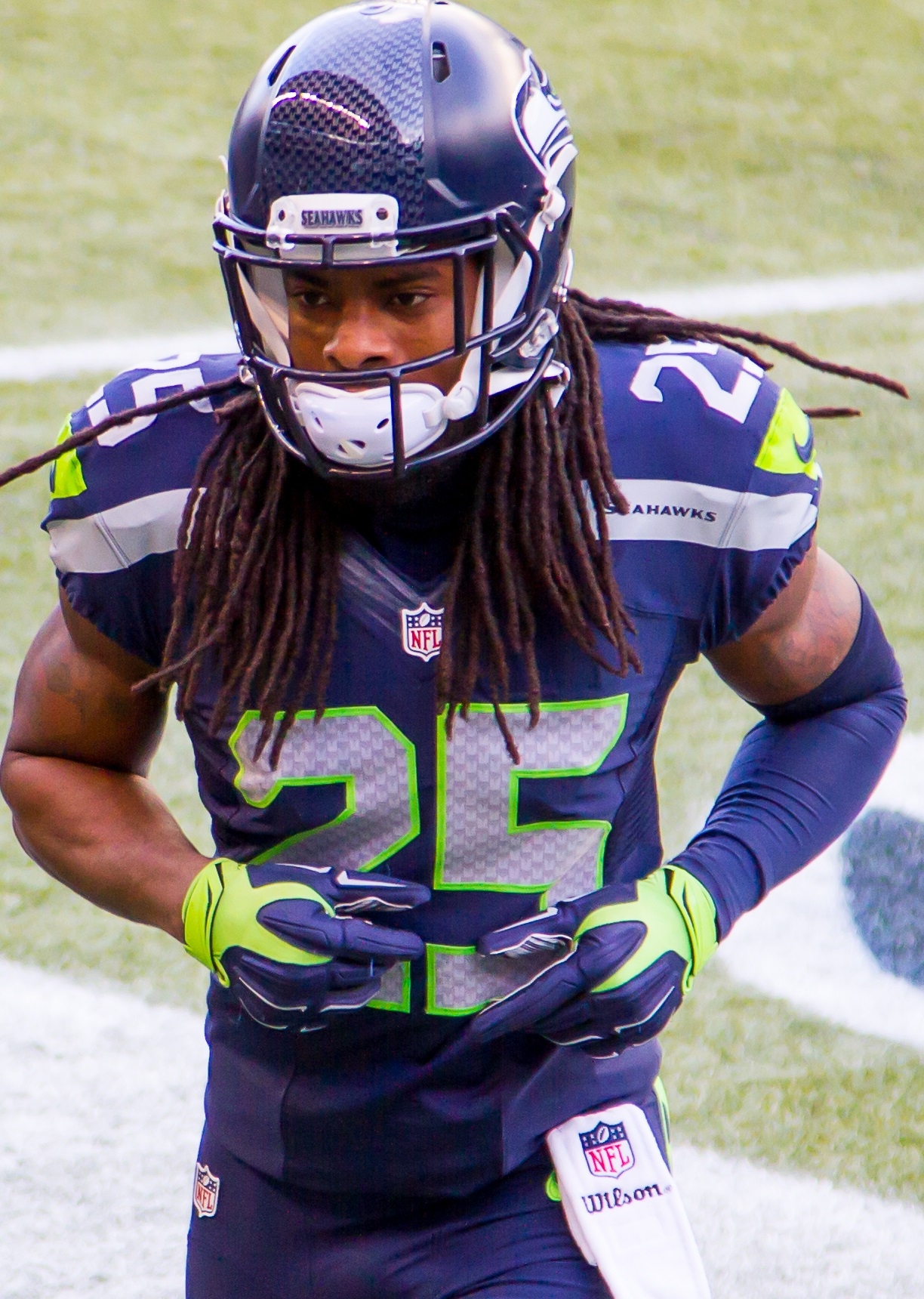
Drafted in the fifth round, Richard Sherman was an integral member of the Seattle Seahawks' "Legion of Boom" secondary that contributed to their Super Bowl XLVIII victory

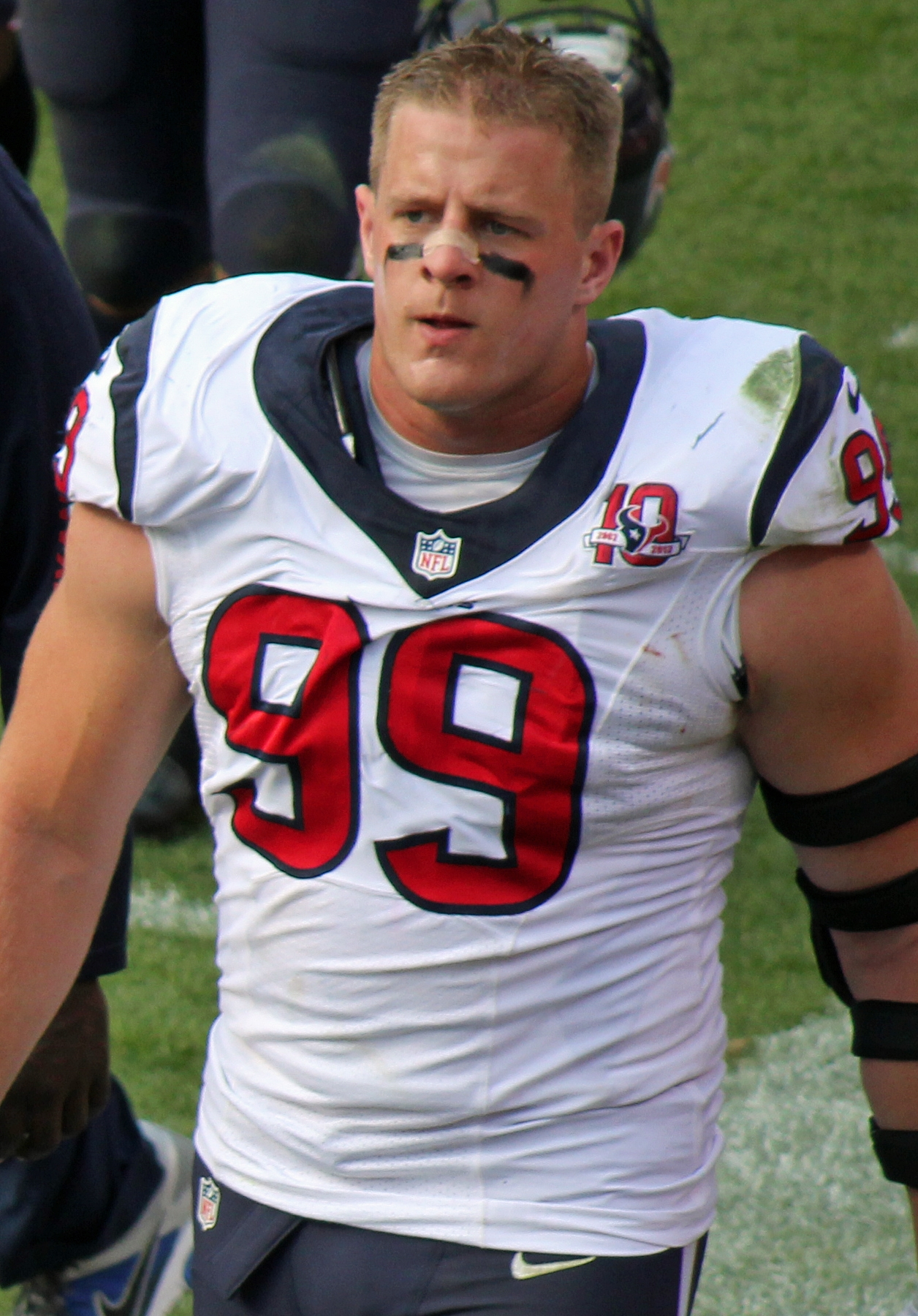
J. J. Watt was drafted by the Houston Texans and was named Defensive Player of the Year three times in his career

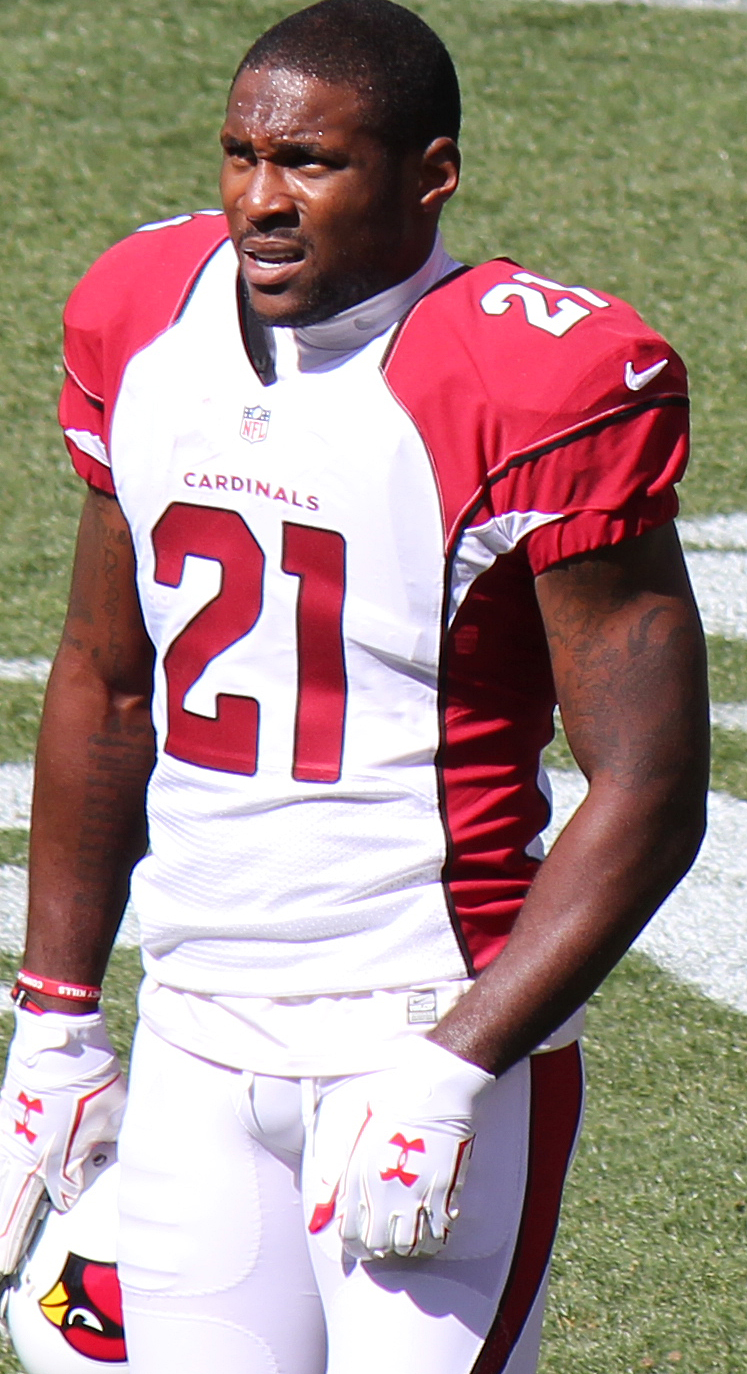
Patrick Peterson made eight straight Pro Bowls and was considered a top cornerback in the NFL during that time

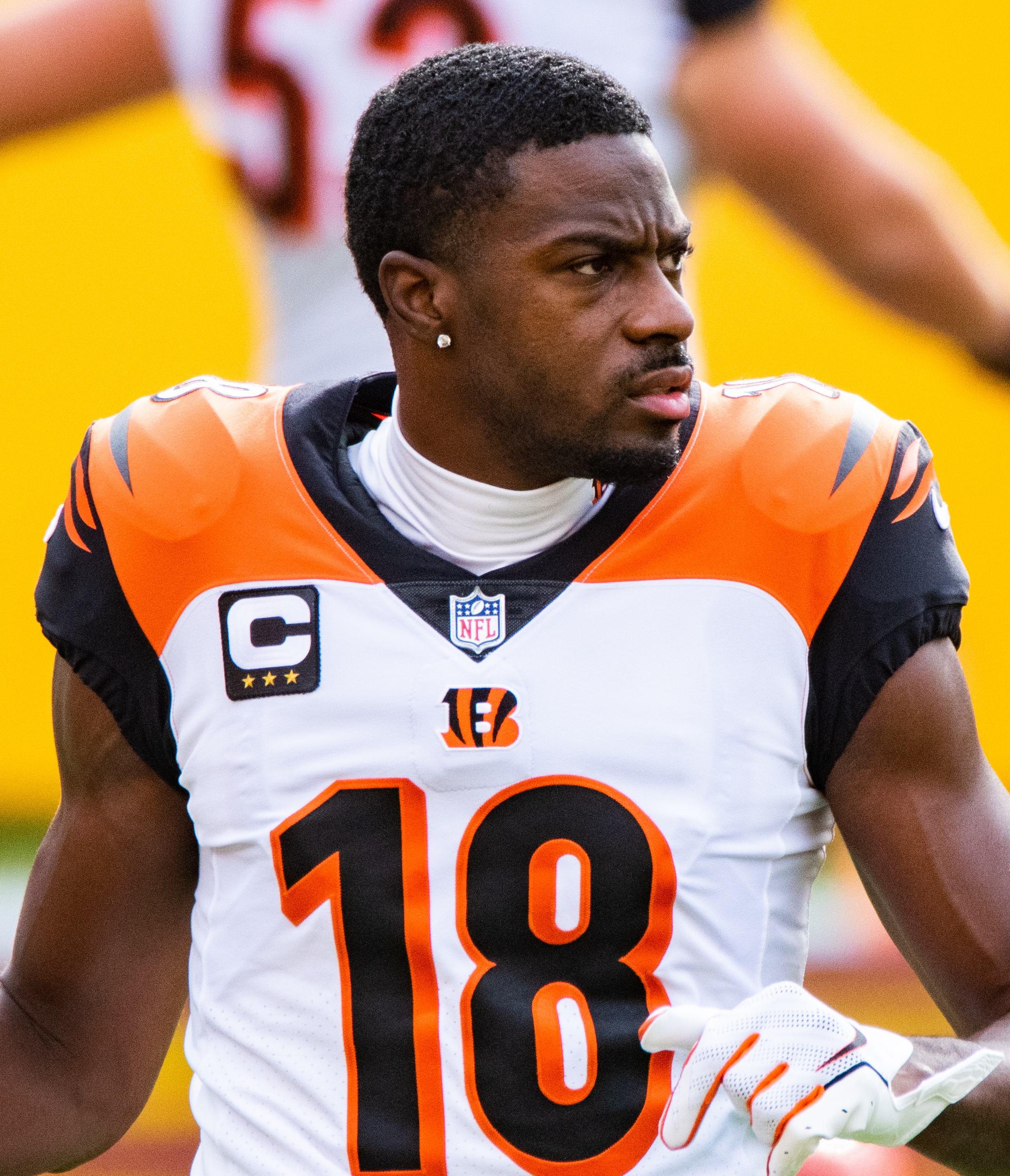
A. J. Green, drafted 4th overall by the Cincinnati Bengals, made 7 straight Pro Bowls since being drafted.

Rnd.	Pick	Team	Player	Pos.	College	Notes
1	1	Carolina Panthers	Cam Newton ^{†}	QB	Auburn	2010 Heisman Trophy winner (Note: Cam Newton was the 2010 winner of the Heisman Trophy which is awarded annually to the player deemed the most outstanding player in collegiate football.)
1	2	Denver Broncos	Von Miller ^{†}	LB	Texas A&M	Super Bowl 50 MVP
1	3	Buffalo Bills	Marcell Dareus ^{†}	DT	Alabama	
1	4	Cincinnati Bengals	A. J. Green ^{†}	WR	Georgia	
1	5	Arizona Cardinals	Patrick Peterson ^{†}	CB	LSU	
1	6	Atlanta Falcons	Julio Jones ^{†}	WR	Alabama	from Cleveland (Note: No. 6: Cleveland → Atlanta (D). Cleveland traded a first-round selection (6th overall) to Atlanta in exchange for first-, second- and fourth-round selections (27th, 59th and 124th overall), and 2012 first- and fourth-round selections.)
1	7	San Francisco 49ers	Aldon Smith ^{†}	LB	Missouri	
1	8	Tennessee Titans	Jake Locker	QB	Washington	
1	9	Dallas Cowboys	Tyron Smith ^{†}	T	USC	
1	10	Jacksonville Jaguars	Blaine Gabbert	QB	Missouri	from Washington (Note: No. 10: Washington → Jacksonville (D). Washington traded a first-round selection (10th overall) to Jacksonville in exchange for first- and second-round selections (16th and 49th overall).)
1	11	Houston Texans	J. J. Watt ^{†}	DE	Wisconsin	
1	12	Minnesota Vikings	Christian Ponder	QB	Florida State	
1	13	Detroit Lions	Nick Fairley	DT	Auburn	
1	14	St. Louis Rams	Robert Quinn ^{†}	DE	North Carolina	
1	15	Miami Dolphins	Mike Pouncey ^{†}	C	Florida	
1	16	Washington Redskins	Ryan Kerrigan ^{†}	DE	Purdue	from Jacksonville (Note: No. 16: Jacksonville → Washington (D). See Round 1: Washington → Jacksonville.)
1	17	New England Patriots	Nate Solder	T	Colorado	from Oakland (Note: No. 17: Oakland → New England (PD). Oakland traded a first-round selection (17th overall) to New England in exchange for DE Richard Seymour.)
1	18	San Diego Chargers	Corey Liuget	DT	Illinois	
1	19	New York Giants	Prince Amukamara	CB	Nebraska	
1	20	Tampa Bay Buccaneers	Adrian Clayborn	DE	Iowa	
1	21	Cleveland Browns	Phil Taylor	DT	Baylor	from Kansas City (Note: No. 21: Kansas City → Cleveland (D). Kansas City traded a first-round selection (21st overall) to Cleveland in exchange for first- and third-round selections (27th and 70th overall).)
1	22	Indianapolis Colts	Anthony Castonzo	T	Boston College	
1	23	Philadelphia Eagles	Danny Watkins	G	Baylor	
1	24	New Orleans Saints	Cameron Jordan ^{†}	DE	California	
1	25	Seattle Seahawks	James Carpenter	T	Alabama	
1	26	Kansas City Chiefs	Jonathan Baldwin	WR	Pittsburgh	from Atlanta via Cleveland (Note: No. 26: Atlanta → Cleveland → Kansas City. Multiple trades: Atlanta → Cleveland (D). See Round 1: Cleveland → Atlanta. Cleveland → Kansas City (D). See Round 1: Kansas City → Cleveland. Baltimore Ravens → Kansas City (time expired). Baltimore originally held the 26th pick, but did not submit their selection in the allotted 10 minutes, which allowed Kansas City to jump in front of them. Baltimore had an agreement to trade the selection to Chicago in exchange for first- and fourth-round selections, but Chicago failed to call in the trade to the league office and thus the trade was not completed. Baltimore recovered to make its selection after Kansas City submitted its pick.)
1	27	Baltimore Ravens	Jimmy Smith	CB	Colorado	in lieu of pick 26 (time expired) (Note: No. 27: Kansas City → Baltimore (D). See Round 1: Baltimore Ravens.)
1	28	New Orleans Saints	Mark Ingram II ^{†}	RB	Alabama	from New England; (Note: No. 28: New England → New Orleans (D). New England traded a first-round selection (28th overall) to New Orleans in exchange for a second-round selection (56th overall) and a 2012 first-round selection.) 2009 Heisman Trophy winner (Note: Mark Ingram was the 2009 winner of the Heisman Trophy which is awarded annually to the player deemed the most outstanding player in collegiate football.)
1	29	Chicago Bears	Gabe Carimi	T	Wisconsin	
1	30	New York Jets	Muhammad Wilkerson ^{†}	DE	Temple	
1	31	Pittsburgh Steelers	Cameron Heyward ^{†}	DE	Ohio State	
1	32	Green Bay Packers	Derek Sherrod	T	Mississippi State	
2	33	New England Patriots	Ras-I Dowling	CB	Virginia	from Carolina (Note: No. 33: Carolina → New England (PD). Carolina traded a second-round selection (33rd overall) to New England in exchange for a 2010 third-round selection.)
2	34	Buffalo Bills	Aaron Williams	CB	Texas	
2	35	Cincinnati Bengals	Andy Dalton ^{†}	QB	TCU	
2	36	San Francisco 49ers	Colin Kaepernick	QB	Nevada	from Denver (Note: No. 36: Denver → San Francisco (D). Denver traded a second-round selection (36th overall) to San Francisco in exchange for second-, fourth- and fifth-round selections (45th, 108th and 141st overall).)
2	37	Cleveland Browns	Jabaal Sheard	DE	Pittsburgh	
2	38	Arizona Cardinals	Ryan Williams	RB	Virginia Tech	
2	39	Tennessee Titans	Akeem Ayers	LB	UCLA	
2	40	Dallas Cowboys	Bruce Carter	LB	North Carolina	
2	41	Washington Redskins	Jarvis Jenkins	DT	Clemson	
2	42	Houston Texans	Brooks Reed	DE	Arizona	
2	43	Minnesota Vikings	Kyle Rudolph ^{†}	TE	Notre Dame	
2	44	Detroit Lions	Titus Young	WR	Boise State	
2	45	Denver Broncos	Rahim Moore	S	UCLA	from San Francisco (Note: No. 45: San Francisco → San Diego → Denver Broncos (SD). See Round 2: Denver → San Francisco.)
2	46	Denver Broncos	Orlando Franklin	T	Miami (FL)	from Miami (Note: No. 46: Miami → Denver (PD). Miami traded a second-round selection (46th overall) and a 2010 second-round selection to Denver in exchange for WR Brandon Marshall.)
2	47	St. Louis Rams	Lance Kendricks	TE	Wisconsin	
2	48	Oakland Raiders	Stefen Wisniewski	C	Penn State	
2	49	Indianapolis Colts	Ben Ijalana	T	Villanova	from Jacksonville via Washington (Note: No. 49: Jacksonville → Washington → Indianapolis. Multiple trades: Jacksonville → Washington (D). See Round 1: Washington → Jacksonville. Washington → Indianapolis (D). Washington traded a second-round selection (49th overall) to Indianapolis in exchange for second- and fifth-round selections (53rd and 152nd overall).)
2	50	San Diego Chargers	Marcus Gilchrist	CB	Clemson	
2	51	Tampa Bay Buccaneers	Da'Quan Bowers	DE	Clemson	
2	52	New York Giants	Marvin Austin	DT	North Carolina	
2	53	Chicago Bears	Stephen Paea	DT	Oregon State	from Indianapolis via Washington (Note: No. 53: Indianapolis → Washington → Chicago. Multiple trades: Indianapolis → Washington (D). See Round 2: Washington → Indianapolis. Washington → Chicago (D). Washington traded a second-round selection (53rd overall) to Chicago in exchange for second- and fourth-round selections (62nd and 127th overall).)
2	54	Philadelphia Eagles	Jaiquawn Jarrett	S	Temple	
2	55	Kansas City Chiefs	Rodney Hudson ^{†}	G	Florida State	
2	56	New England Patriots	Shane Vereen	RB	California	from New Orleans (Note: No. 56: New Orleans → New England (D). See Round 1: New England → New Orleans.)
2	57	Detroit Lions	Mikel Leshoure	RB	Illinois	from Seattle (Note: No. 57: Seattle → Detroit (D). Seattle traded second-, fifth- and seventh-round selections (57th, 157th and 209th overall) to Detroit in exchange for third-, fourth-, fifth- and seventh-round selections (75th, 107th, 154th and 205th overall).)
2	58	Baltimore Ravens	Torrey Smith	WR	Maryland	
2	59	Cleveland Browns	Greg Little	WR	North Carolina	from Atlanta (Note: No. 59: Atlanta → Cleveland (D). See Round 1: Cleveland → Atlanta.)
2	60	Houston Texans	Brandon Harris	CB	Miami (FL)	from New England (Note: No. 60: New England → Houston (D). New England traded a second-round selection (60th overall) to Houston in exchange for third- and fifth-round selections (73rd and 138th overall).)
2	61	San Diego Chargers	Jonas Mouton	LB	Michigan	from NY Jets (Note: No. 61: NY Jets → San Diego (PD). The Jets traded a conditional second-round selection (61st overall) to San Diego in exchange for CB Antonio Cromartie.)
2	62	Miami Dolphins	Daniel Thomas	RB	Kansas State	from Chicago via Washington (Note: No. 62: Chicago → Washington → Miami. Multiple trades: Chicago → Washington (D). See Round 2: Washington → Chicago. Washington → Miami (D). Washington traded a second-round selection (62nd overall) to Miami in exchange for third-, fifth- and seventh-round selections (79th, 146th and 217th overall).)
2	63	Pittsburgh Steelers	Marcus Gilbert	T	Florida	
2	64	Green Bay Packers	Randall Cobb ^{†}	WR	Kentucky	
3	65	Carolina Panthers	Terrell McClain	DT	South Florida	
3	66	Cincinnati Bengals	Dontay Moch	LB	Nevada	
3	67	Denver Broncos	Nate Irving	LB	NC State	
3	68	Buffalo Bills	Kelvin Sheppard	LB	LSU	
3	69	Arizona Cardinals	Rob Housler	TE	Florida Atlantic	
3	70	Kansas City Chiefs	Justin Houston ^{†}	LB	Georgia	from Cleveland (Note: No. 70: Cleveland → Kansas City (D). See Round 1: Kansas City → Cleveland.)
3	71	Dallas Cowboys	DeMarco Murray ^{†}	RB	Oklahoma	
3	72	New Orleans Saints	Martez Wilson	LB	Illinois	from Washington (Note: No. 72: Washington → New Orleans (PD). Washington traded a third-round selection (72nd overall) and a conditional 2012 sixth-round selection to New Orleans in exchange for a fifth-round selection (155th overall) and OT Jammal Brown.)
3	73	New England Patriots	Stevan Ridley	RB	LSU	from Houston (Note: No. 73: Houston → New England (D). See Round 2: New England → Houston.)
3	74	New England Patriots	Ryan Mallett	QB	Arkansas	from Minnesota (Note: No. 74: Minnesota → New England (PD). Minnesota traded a third-round selection (74th overall) to New England in exchange for a 2012 seventh-round selection and WR Randy Moss.)
3	75	Seattle Seahawks	John Moffitt	G	Wisconsin	from Detroit (Note: No. 75: Detroit → Seattle (D). See Round 2: Seattle → Detroit.)
3	76	Jacksonville Jaguars	Will Rackley	G	Lehigh	from San Francisco (Note: No. 76: San Francisco → Jacksonville (D). San Francisco traded a third-round selection (76th overall) to Jacksonville in exchange for third- and sixth-round selections (80th and 182nd overall).)
3	77	Tennessee Titans	Jurrell Casey ^{†}	DT	USC	
3	78	St. Louis Rams	Austin Pettis	WR	Boise State	
3	79	Washington Redskins	Leonard Hankerson	WR	Miami (FL)	from Miami (Note: No. 79: Miami → Washington (D). See Round 2: Washington → Miami.)
3	80	San Francisco 49ers	Chris Culliver	CB	South Carolina	from Jacksonville (Note: No. 80: Jacksonville → San Francisco (D). See Round 3: San Francisco → Jacksonville.)
3	81	Oakland Raiders	DeMarcus Van Dyke	CB	Miami (FL)	
3	82	San Diego Chargers	Vincent Brown	WR	San Diego State	
3	83	New York Giants	Jerrel Jernigan	WR	Troy	
3	84	Tampa Bay Buccaneers	Mason Foster	LB	Washington	
3	85	Baltimore Ravens	Jah Reid	T	UCF	from Philadelphia (Note: No. 85: Philadelphia → Baltimore (D). Philadelphia traded a third-round selection to Baltimore in exchange for third- and sixth-round selections (90th and 191st overall).)
3	86	Kansas City Chiefs	Allen Bailey	DE	Miami (FL)	
3	87	Indianapolis Colts	Drake Nevis	DT	LSU	
3	88	New Orleans Saints	Johnny Patrick	CB	Louisville	
3	89	San Diego Chargers	Shareece Wright	CB	USC	from Seattle (Note: No. 89: Seattle → San Diego (PD). Seattle traded a third-round selection (89th overall) and a 2010 second-round selection to San Diego in exchange for a 2010 second-round selection (60th overall) and QB Charlie Whitehurst.)
3	90	Philadelphia Eagles	Curtis Marsh	CB	Utah State	from Baltimore (Note: No. 85: Baltimore → Philadelphia (D). See Round 3: Philadelphia → Baltimore.)
3	91	Atlanta Falcons	Akeem Dent	LB	Georgia	
3	92	Oakland Raiders	Joseph Barksdale	T	LSU	from New England (Note: No. 92: New England → Oakland (D). New England traded third- and fourth-round selections (125th overall) to Oakland in exchange for a seventh-round selection (219th overall) and a 2012 second-round selection.)
3	93	Chicago Bears	Chris Conte	S	California	
3	94	New York Jets	Kenrick Ellis	DT	Hampton	
3	95	Pittsburgh Steelers	Curtis Brown	CB	Texas	
3	96	Green Bay Packers	Alex Green	RB	Hawaii	
3*	97	Carolina Panthers	Sione Fua	DT	Stanford	
4	98	Carolina Panthers	Brandon Hogan	CB	West Virginia	
4	99	Seattle Seahawks	K. J. Wright ^{†}	LB	Mississippi State	from Denver via New England (Note: No. 99: Denver → New England → Seattle. Multiple trades: Denver → New England (PD). Denver traded a fourth-round selection (99th overall) to New England in exchange for a sixth-round selection (189th overall) and RB Laurence Maroney. New England → Seattle (PD). New England traded a fourth-round selection (99th overall) to Seattle in exchange for WR Deion Branch.)
4	100	Buffalo Bills	Da'Norris Searcy	S	North Carolina	
4	101	Cincinnati Bengals	Clint Boling	G	Georgia	
4	102	Cleveland Browns	Jordan Cameron ^{†}	TE	USC	
4	103	Arizona Cardinals	Sam Acho	DE	Texas	
4	104	Tampa Bay Buccaneers	Luke Stocker	TE	Tennessee	from Washington via Philadelphia (Note: No. 104: Washington → Philadelphia → Tampa Bay. Multiple trades: Washington → Philadelphia (PD). Washington traded a fourth-round selection (104th overall) and a 2010 second-round selection to Philadelphia in exchange for QB Donovan McNabb. Philadelphia → Tampa Bay (D). Philadelphia traded a fourth-round selection (104th overall) to Tampa Bay in exchange for a fourth-round selection (116th overall) and a 2012 fourth-round selection.)
4	105	Washington Redskins	Roy Helu	RB	Nebraska	from Houston (Note: No. 105: Houston → Washington (D). Houston traded fourth- and sixth-round selections (105th and 178th overall) to Houston in exchange for a fourth-round selection and two fifth-round selections (127th, 144th and 152nd overall).)
4	106	Minnesota Vikings	Christian Ballard	DE	Iowa	
4	107	Seattle Seahawks	Kris Durham	WR	Georgia	from Detroit (Note: No. 107: Detroit → Seattle (D). See Round 3: Seattle → Detroit.)
4	108	Denver Broncos	Quinton Carter	S	Oklahoma	from San Francisco (Note: No. 108: San Francisco → Denver (D). See Round 2: Denver → San Francisco.)
4	109	Tennessee Titans	Colin McCarthy	LB	Miami (FL)	
4	110	Dallas Cowboys	David Arkin	G	Missouri State	
4	111	Miami Dolphins	Clyde Gates	WR	Abilene Christian	
4	112	St. Louis Rams	Greg Salas	WR	Hawaii	
4	113	Oakland Raiders	Chimdi Chekwa	CB	Ohio State	
4	114	Jacksonville Jaguars	Cecil Shorts	WR	Mount Union	
4	115	San Francisco 49ers	Kendall Hunter	RB	Oklahoma State	from San Diego (Note: No. 115: San Diego → San Francisco (PD). San Diego traded a fourth-round selection (115th overall), and 2010 third- and sixth-round selections to San Francisco in exchange for a 2010 third-round selection.)
4	116	Philadelphia Eagles	Casey Matthews	LB	Oregon	from Tampa Bay (Note: No. 116: Tampa Bay → Philadelphia (D). See Round 4: Philadelphia → Tampa Bay.)
4	117	New York Giants	James Brewer	T	Indiana	
4	118	Kansas City Chiefs	Jalil Brown	CB	Colorado	
4	119	Indianapolis Colts	Delone Carter	RB	Syracuse	
4	120	Philadelphia Eagles	Alex Henery	K	Nebraska	
4	121	Jacksonville Jaguars	Chris Prosinski	S	Wyoming	from New Orleans (Note: No. 121: New Orleans → Jacksonville (PD). New Orleans traded a fourth-round selection (121st overall) to Jacksonville in exchange for a 2010 fifth-round selection.)
4	122	Buffalo Bills	Chris Hairston	T	Clemson	from Seattle (Note: No. 122: Seattle → Buffalo (PD). Seattle traded a fourth-round selection (122nd overall) and a conditional 2012 selection to Buffalo in exchange for RB Marshawn Lynch.)
4	123	Baltimore Ravens	Tandon Doss	WR	Indiana	
4	124	Cleveland Browns	Owen Marecic	FB	Stanford	from Atlanta (Note: No. 124: Atlanta → Cleveland (D). See Round 1: Cleveland → Atlanta.)
4	125	Oakland Raiders	Taiwan Jones	RB	Eastern Washington	from New England (Note: No. 125: New England → Oakland (D). See Round 3: New England → Oakland.)
4	126	New York Jets	Bilal Powell	RB	Louisville	
4	127	Houston Texans	Rashad Carmichael	CB	Virginia Tech	from Chicago via Washington (Note: No. 127: Chicago → Washington → Houston. Multiple trades: Chicago → Washington (D). See Round 2: Washington → Chicago. Washington → Houston (D). See Round 4: Houston → Washington.)
4	128	Pittsburgh Steelers	Cortez Allen	CB	The Citadel	
4	129	Denver Broncos	Julius Thomas ^{†}	TE	Portland State	from Green Bay (Note: No. 129: Green Bay → Denver (D). Green Bay traded fourth- and seventh-round selections (129th and 204th overall) to Denver in exchange for fifth- and sixth-round selections (141st and 186th overall).)
4*	130	Tennessee Titans	Jamie Harper	RB	Clemson	
4*	131	Green Bay Packers	Davon House	CB	New Mexico State	
5	132	Carolina Panthers	Kealoha Pilares	WR	Hawaii	
5	133	Buffalo Bills	Johnny White	RB	North Carolina	
5	134	Cincinnati Bengals	Robert Sands	S	West Virginia	
5	135	Kansas City Chiefs	Ricky Stanzi	QB	Iowa	from Denver via Tampa Bay (Note: No. 135: Denver → Tampa Bay → Kansas City. Multiple trades: Denver → Tampa Bay (PD). Denver traded a fifth-round selection (135th overall) to Tampa Bay in exchange for two 2010 seventh-round selections (225th and 232nd overall). Tampa Bay → Kansas City (PD). Tampa Bay traded a fifth-round selection (135th overall) to Kansas City in exchange for a sixth-round selection (187th overall) and DT Alex Magee.)
5	136	Arizona Cardinals	Anthony Sherman ^{†}	FB	Connecticut	
5	137	Cleveland Browns	Buster Skrine	CB	Chattanooga	
5	138	New England Patriots	Marcus Cannon	T	TCU	from Houston (Note: No. 138: Houston → New England (D). See Round 2: New England → Houston.)
5	139	Minnesota Vikings	Brandon Burton	CB	Utah	
5	140	Kansas City Chiefs	Gabe Miller	LB	Oregon State	from Detroit (Note: No. 140: Detroit → Kansas City. As a penalty for tampering with Kansas City players, Detroit was forced to swap its fifth-round selection with Kansas City's, and to forfeit its 2012 seventh-round selection, or sixth round if they make the playoffs. (Note: Lions Nailed by NFL for Tampering, Will Lose Draft Pick Archived March 23, 2011, at the Wayback Machine AOL News February 20, 2011))
5	141	Green Bay Packers	D. J. Williams	TE	Arkansas	from San Francisco via Denver (Note: No. 141: San Francisco → Denver → Green Bay. Multiple trades: San Francisco → Denver (D). See Round 2: Denver → San Francisco. Denver → Green Bay (D). See Round 4: Green Bay → Denver.)
5	142	Tennessee Titans	Karl Klug	DE	Iowa	
5	143	Dallas Cowboys	Josh Thomas	CB	Buffalo	
5	144	Houston Texans	Shiloh Keo	S	Idaho	from Washington (Note: No. 144: Washington → Houston (D). See Round 4: Houston → Washington.)
5	145	Atlanta Falcons	Jacquizz Rodgers	RB	Oregon State	from St. Louis (Note: No. 145: St. Louis → Atlanta (D). St. Louis traded a fifth-round selection (145th overall) to Atlanta in exchange for fifth- and seventh-round selections (158th and 229th overall).)
5	146	Washington Redskins	Dejon Gomes	S	Nebraska	from Miami (Note: No. 146: Miami → Washington (D). See Round 2: Washington → Miami.)
5	147	Jacksonville Jaguars	Rod Issac	CB	Middle Tennessee	
5	148	Oakland Raiders	Denarius Moore	WR	Tennessee	
5	149	Philadelphia Eagles	Dion Lewis	RB	Pittsburgh	from San Diego (Note: No. 149: San Diego → Philadelphia (PD). San Diego traded a fifth-round selection (149th overall) and a 2010 fifth-round selection to Philadelphia in exchange for a 2010 fifth-round selection.)
5	150	Cleveland Browns	Jason Pinkston	T	Pittsburgh	from NY Giants via Minnesota (Note: No. 150: NY Giants → Minnesota → Cleveland. Multiple trades: NY Giants → Minnesota (PD). The NY Giants traded a fifth-round selection (150th overall) and a conditional 2012 selection to Minnesota in exchange for RB Darius Reynaud and QB Sage Rosenfels. Minnesota → Cleveland (D). Minnesota traded a fifth-round selection (150th overall) to Cleveland in exchange for two sixth-round selections (168th and 170th overall))
5	151	Tampa Bay Buccaneers	Ahmad Black	S	Florida	
5	152	Houston Texans	T. J. Yates	QB	North Carolina	from Indianapolis via Washington (Note: No. 152: Indianapolis → Washington → Houston. Multiple trades: Indianapolis → Washington (D). See Round 2: Washington → Indianapolis. Washington → Houston (D). See Round 4: Houston → Washington.)
5	153	New York Jets	Jeremy Kerley	WR	TCU	from Philadelphia (Note: No. 153: Philadelphia → NY Jets (D). Philadelphia traded fifth- and seventh-round selections (153rd and 227th overall) to the NY Jets in exchange for fifth- and sixth-round selections (161st and 194th overall).)
5	154	Seattle Seahawks	Richard Sherman ^{†}	CB	Stanford	from Kansas City via Detroit (Note: No. 154: Kansas City → Detroit → Seattle. Multiple trades: Kansas City → Detroit. See Round 5: Detroit → Kansas City. Detroit → Seattle (D). See Round 2: Seattle → Detroit.)
5	155	Washington Redskins	Niles Paul	WR	Nebraska	from New Orleans (Note: No. 155: New Orleans → Washington (PD). See Round 3: Washington → New Orleans.)
5	156	Seattle Seahawks	Mark LeGree	S	Appalachian State	
5	157	Detroit Lions	Doug Hogue	LB	Syracuse	from Baltimore via Seattle (Note: No. 157: Baltimore → Seattle → Detroit. Multiple trades: Baltimore → Seattle (PD). Baltimore traded a conditional fifth-round selection (157th overall) to Seattle in exchange for CB Josh Wilson. Seattle → Detroit (D). See Round 2: Seattle → Detroit.)
5	158	St. Louis Rams	Jermale Hines	S	Ohio State	from Atlanta (Note: No. 158: Atlanta → St. Louis (D). See Round 5: St. Louis → Atlanta.)
5	159	New England Patriots	Lee Smith	TE	Marshall	
5	160	Chicago Bears	Nathan Enderle	QB	Idaho	
5	161	Philadelphia Eagles	Julian Vandervelde	G	Iowa	from NY Jets (Note: No. 161: NY Jets → Philadelphia (D). See Round 5: Philadelphia → NY Jets.)
5	162	Pittsburgh Steelers	Chris Carter	LB	Fresno State	
5	163	San Francisco 49ers	Daniel Kilgore	G	Appalachian State	from Green Bay (Note: No. 163: Green Bay → San Francisco (D). Green Bay traded a fifth-round selection (163rd overall) to San Francisco in exchange for sixth- and seventh-round selections (174th and 231st overall).)
5*	164	Baltimore Ravens	Chykie Brown	CB	Texas	
5*	165	Baltimore Ravens	Pernell McPhee	DE	Mississippi State	
6	166	Carolina Panthers	Lawrence Wilson	LB	Connecticut	
6	167	Cincinnati Bengals	Ryan Whalen	WR	Stanford	
6	168	Minnesota Vikings	DeMarcus Love	T	Arkansas	from Denver via Cleveland (Note: No. 168: Denver → Cleveland → Minnesota. Multiple trades: Denver → Cleveland (PD). Denver traded a sixth-round selection (168th overall), a conditional 2012 selection and RB Peyton Hillis to Cleveland in exchange for QB Brady Quinn. Cleveland → Minnesota (D). See Round 5: Minnesota → Cleveland.)
6	169	Buffalo Bills	Chris White	LB	Mississippi State	
6	170	Minnesota Vikings	Mistral Raymond	S	South Florida	from Cleveland (Note: No. 170: Cleveland → Minnesota (D). See Round 5: Minnesota → Cleveland.)
6	171	Arizona Cardinals	Quan Sturdivant	LB	North Carolina	
6	172	Minnesota Vikings	Brandon Fusco	C	Slippery Rock	
6	173	Seattle Seahawks	Byron Maxwell	CB	Clemson	from Detroit (Note: No. 173: Detroit → Seattle (PD). Detroit traded a sixth-round selection (173rd overall) to Seattle in exchange for DE Lawrence Jackson.)
6	174	Miami Dolphins	Charles Clay	FB	Tulsa	from San Francisco via Green Bay (Note: No. 174: San Francisco → Green Bay → Miami. Multiple trades: San Francisco → Green Bay (D). See Round 5: Green Bay → San Francisco. Green Bay → Miami (D). Green Bay traded sixth- and seventh-round selections (174th and 231st overall) to Miami in exchange for sixth- and seventh-round selections (179th and 218th overall).)
6	175	Tennessee Titans	Byron Stingily	T	Louisville	
6	176	Dallas Cowboys	Dwayne Harris ^{†}	WR	East Carolina	
6	177	Washington Redskins	Evan Royster	RB	Penn State	
6	178	Washington Redskins	Aldrick Robinson	WR	SMU	from Houston (Note: No. 178: Houston → Washington (D). See Round 4: Houston → Washington.)
6	179	Green Bay Packers	Caleb Schlauderaff	G	Utah	from Miami (Note: No. 179: Miami → Green Bay (D). See Round 6: Green Bay → Miami.)
6	180	Baltimore Ravens	Tyrod Taylor ^{†}	QB	Virginia Tech	from St. Louis (Note: No. 180: St. Louis → Baltimore (PD). St. Louis traded a sixth-round selection (180th overall) to Baltimore in exchange for a seventh-round selection (228th overall) and WR Mark Clayton.)
6	181	Oakland Raiders	Richard Gordon	TE	Miami (FL)	
6	182	San Francisco 49ers	Ronald Johnson	WR	USC	from Jacksonville (Note: No. 182: Jacksonville → San Francisco (D). See Round 3: San Francisco → Jacksonville.)
6	183	San Diego Chargers	Jordan Todman	RB	Connecticut	
6	184	Arizona Cardinals	David Carter	DT	UCLA	from Tampa Bay via Philadelphia (Note: No. 184: Tampa Bay → Philadelphia → Arizona. Multiple trades: Tampa Bay → Philadelphia (PD). Tampa Bay traded a sixth-round selection (184th overall) to Philadelphia in exchange for WR Reggie Brown. Philadelphia → Arizona (PD). Philadelphia traded a sixth-round selection (184th overall) to Arizona in exchange for G Reggie Wells.)
6	185	New York Giants	Greg Jones	LB	Michigan State	
6	186	Green Bay Packers	D. J. Smith	OLB	Appalachian State	from Philadelphia via Detroit and Denver (Note: No. 186: Philadelphia → Detroit → Denver → Green Bay. Multiple trades: Philadelphia → Detroit (PD). Philadelphia traded a sixth-round selection (186th overall) to Detroit in exchange for a 2010 seventh-round selection. Detroit → Denver (PD). Detroit traded a sixth-round selection (186th overall) and TE Dan Gronkowski to Denver in exchange for a seventh-round selection (205th overall) and CB Alphonso Smith. Denver → Green Bay (D). See Round 4: Green Bay → Denver)
6	187	Tampa Bay Buccaneers	Allen Bradford	RB	USC	from Kansas City (Note: No. 187: Kansas City → Tampa Bay (PD). See Round 5: Tampa Bay → Kansas City (PD).)
6	188	Indianapolis Colts	Chris L. Rucker	CB	Michigan State	
6	189	Denver Broncos	Mike Mohamed	LB	California	from New Orleans via New England (Note: No. 189: New Orleans → New England → Denver. Multiple trades: New Orleans → New England (PD). New Orleans traded a sixth-round selection (189th overall) to New England in exchange for TE David Thomas. New England → Denver (PD). See Round 4: Denver → New England.)
6	190	San Francisco 49ers	Colin Jones	S	TCU	from Seattle (Note: No. 190: Seattle → San Francisco (PD). Seattle traded a sixth-round selection (190th overall) to San Francisco in exchange for DE Kentwan Balmer. (Note: "Report: Niners Trade Balmer to Seattle". csncalifornia.com. CSNBayArea.com Staff. August 16, 2010.))
6	191	Philadelphia Eagles	Jason Kelce ^{†}	C	Cincinnati	from Baltimore (Note: No. 191: Baltimore → Philadelphia (D). See Round 3: Philadelphia → Baltimore.)
6	192	Atlanta Falcons	Matt Bosher	P	Miami (FL)	
6	193	Philadelphia Eagles	Brian Rolle	LB	Ohio State	from New England (Note: No. 193: New England → Philadelphia (D). New England traded a sixth-round selection (193rd overall) to Philadelphia in exchange for a sixth-round selection (194th overall). The trade was reportedly made "just for fun".)
6	194	New England Patriots	Markell Carter	DE	Central Arkansas	from NY Jets via Philadelphia (Note: No. 194: NY Jets → Philadelphia → New England. Multiple trades: NY Jets → Philadelphia (D). See Round 5: Philadelphia → NY Jets. Philadelphia → New England (D). See Round 6: New England → Philadelphia.)
6	195	Chicago Bears	J. T. Thomas	LB	West Virginia	
6	196	Pittsburgh Steelers	Keith Williams	G	Nebraska	
6	197	Green Bay Packers	Ricky Elmore	DE	Arizona	
6*	198	New York Giants	Tyler Sash	S	Iowa	
6*	199	Kansas City Chiefs	Jerrell Powe	DT	Ole Miss	
6*	200	Minnesota Vikings	Ross Homan	LB	Ohio State	
6*	201	San Diego Chargers	Stephen Schilling	G	Michigan	
6*	202	New York Giants	Jacquian Williams	LB	South Florida	
6*	203	Carolina Panthers	Zack Williams	C	Washington State	
7	204	Denver Broncos	Virgil Green	TE	Nevada	from Carolina via Green Bay (Note: No. 204: Carolina → Green Bay → Denver. Multiple trades: Carolina → Green Bay (PD). Carolina traded a conditional seventh-round selection (204th overall) to Green Bay in exchange for LS J. J. Jansen. Green Bay → Denver (D). See Round 4: Green Bay → Denver.)
7	205	Seattle Seahawks	Lazarius Levingston	DE	LSU	from Denver via Detroit (Note: No. 205: Denver → Detroit → Seattle. Multiple trades: Denver → Detroit (PD). See Round 6: Detroit → Denver (PD). Detroit → Seattle (D). See Round 2: Seattle → Detroit.)
7	206	Buffalo Bills	Justin Rogers	CB	Richmond	
7	207	Cincinnati Bengals	Korey Lindsey	CB	Southern Illinois	
7	208	New York Jets	Greg McElroy	QB	Alabama	from Arizona (Note: No. 208: Arizona → NY Jets (PD). Arizona traded a seventh-round selection (208th overall) and a 2010 fourth-round selection to the NY Jets in exchange for S Kerry Rhodes.)
7	209	Detroit Lions	Johnny Culbreath	T	South Carolina State	from Cleveland via Seattle (Note: No. 209: Cleveland → Seattle → Detroit. Multiple trades: Cleveland → Seattle (PD). Cleveland traded a conditional seventh-round selection (209th overall) to Seattle in exchange for QB Seneca Wallace. Seattle → Detroit (D). See Round 2: Seattle → Detroit.)
7	210	Atlanta Falcons	Andrew Jackson	G	Fresno State	from Detroit (Note: No. 210: Detroit → Atlanta (PD). Detroit traded a conditional seventh-round selection (210th overall) and a 2010 sixth-round selection to Atlanta in exchange for CB Chris Houston.)
7	211	San Francisco 49ers	Bruce Miller	FB	UCF	
7	212	Tennessee Titans	Zach Clayton	DT	Auburn	
7	–	Dallas Cowboys	selection forfeited in 2010 Supplemental draft (Note: Dallas forfeited its seventh-round selection to take DT Josh Brent in the 2010 Supplemental Draft.)			
7	213	Washington Redskins	Brandyn Thompson	CB	Boise State	
7	214	Houston Texans	Derek Newton	T	Arkansas State	
7	215	Minnesota Vikings	D'Aundre Reed	DE	Arizona	
7	216	St. Louis Rams	Mikail Baker	CB	Baylor	
7	217	Washington Redskins	Maurice Hurt	T	Florida	from Miami (Note: No. 217: Miami → Washington (D). See Round 2: Washington → Miami.)
7	218	Green Bay Packers	Ryan Taylor	TE	North Carolina	from Jacksonville via Miami (Note: No. 218: Jacksonville → Miami → Green Bay. Multiple trades: Jacksonville → Miami. Jacksonville traded a conditional seventh-round selection (218th overall) to Miami for G Justin Smiley. Miami → Green Bay (D). See Round 6: Green Bay → Miami.)
7	219	New England Patriots	Malcolm Williams	CB	TCU	from Oakland (Note: No. 219: Oakland → New England (D). See Round 3: New England → Oakland.)
7	220	Dallas Cowboys	Shaun Chapas	FB	Georgia	from San Diego (Note: No. 220: San Diego → Dallas (PD). San Diego traded a conditional seventh-round selection (220th overall) to Dallas in exchange for WR Patrick Crayton.)
7	221	New York Giants	Da'Rel Scott	RB	Maryland	
7	222	Tampa Bay Buccaneers	Anthony Gaitor	CB	FIU	
7	223	Kansas City Chiefs	Shane Bannon	FB	Yale	
7	224	Washington Redskins	Markus White	DE	Florida State	from Indianapolis (Note: No. 224: Indianapolis → Washington (PD). Indianapolis traded a seventh-round selection (224th overall) to Washington in exchange for CB Justin Tryon.)
7	225	Baltimore Ravens	Anthony Allen	RB	Georgia Tech	from Philadelphia (Note: No. 225: Philadelphia → Baltimore (PD). Philadelphia traded a seventh-round selection (225th overall) to Baltimore in exchange for DE Antwan Barnes.)
7	226	New Orleans Saints	Greg Romeus	DE	Pittsburgh	
7	227	New York Jets	Scotty McKnight	WR	Colorado	from Seattle via Philadelphia (Note: No. 227: Seattle → Philadelphia → NY Jets. Multiple trades: Seattle → Philadelphia (PD). Seattle traded a seventh-round selection (227th overall) to Philadelphia in exchange for OT Stacy Andrews. Philadelphia → NY Jets (D). See Round 5: Philadelphia → NY Jets.)
7	228	St. Louis Rams	Jabara Williams	LB	Stephen F. Austin	from Baltimore (Note: No. 228: Baltimore → St. Louis (PD). See Round 6: St. Louis → Baltimore (PD).)
7	229	St. Louis Rams	Jonathan Nelson	CB	Oklahoma	from Atlanta (Note: No. 229: Atlanta → St. Louis (D). See Round 5: St. Louis → Atlanta.)
7	230	Atlanta Falcons	Cliff Matthews	DE	South Carolina	from New England (Note: No. 230: New England → Atlanta (PD). New England traded a seventh-round selection (230th overall) to Atlanta in exchange for OL Quinn Ojinnaka.)
7	–	Chicago Bears	selection forfeited in 2010 Supplemental draft (Note: Chicago forfeited its seventh-round selection to take RB Harvey Unga in the 2010 Supplemental Draft.)			
7	231	Miami Dolphins	Frank Kearse	DT	Alabama A&M	from NY Jets via Detroit, San Francisco and Green Bay (Note: No. 231: NY Jets → Detroit → San Francisco → Green Bay → Miami. Multiple trades: NY Jets → Detroit (PD). The NY Jets traded a seventh-round selection (231st overall) to Detroit in exchange for QB Kevin O'Connell. Detroit → San Francisco (PD). Detroit traded a seventh-round selection (231st overall) to San Francisco in exchange for QB Shaun Hill. San Francisco → Green Bay (D). See Round 5: Green Bay → San Francisco. Green Bay → Miami (D). See Round 6: Green Bay → Miami.)
7	232	Pittsburgh Steelers	Baron Batch	RB	Texas Tech	
7	233	Green Bay Packers	Lawrence Guy	DT	Arizona State	
7*	234	San Diego Chargers	Andrew Gachkar	LB	Missouri	
7*	235	Miami Dolphins	Jimmy Wilson	CB	Montana	
7*	236	Minnesota Vikings	Stephen Burton	WR	West Texas A&M	
7*	237	Philadelphia Eagles	Greg Lloyd Jr.	LB	Connecticut	
7*	238	Tampa Bay Buccaneers	Daniel Hardy	TE	Idaho	
7*	239	San Francisco 49ers	Mike Person	T	Montana State	
7*	240	Philadelphia Eagles	Stanley Havili	FB	USC	
7*	241	Oakland Raiders	David Ausberry	WR	USC	
7*	242	Seattle Seahawks	Malcolm Smith	LB	USC	Super Bowl XLVIII MVP
7*	243	New Orleans Saints	Nate Bussey	LB	Illinois	
7^	244	Carolina Panthers	Lee Ziemba	T	Auburn	
7^	245	Buffalo Bills	Michael Jasper	G	Bethel (TN)	
7^	246	Cincinnati Bengals	Jay Finley	RB	Baylor	
7^	247	Denver Broncos	Jeremy Beal	LB	Oklahoma	
7^	248	Cleveland Browns	Eric Hagg	CB	Nebraska	
7^	249	Arizona Cardinals	DeMarco Sampson	WR	San Diego State	
7^	250	San Francisco 49ers	Curtis Holcomb	CB	Florida A&M	
7^	251	Tennessee Titans	Tommie Campbell	CB	California (PA)	
7^	252	Dallas Cowboys	Bill Nagy	C	Wisconsin	
7^	253	Washington Redskins	Chris Neild	DT	West Virginia	
7^	254	Houston Texans	Cheta Ozougwu	DE	Rice	

== Supplemental draft ==
A supplemental draft was held on August 22, 2011. For each player selected in the supplemental draft, the team forfeits its pick in that round in the draft of the following season. Six players were available in the supplemental draft, but only one was selected.

Rnd.	Pick	Team	Player	Pos.	College	Notes
3	—	Oakland Raiders	Terrelle Pryor	QB	Ohio State	

== Notable undrafted players ==
Original NFL team	Player	Pos.	College	Notes
Baltimore Ravens	Tim Barnes	C	Missouri	
Baltimore Ravens	Josh Bynes	LB	Auburn	
Baltimore Ravens	Ryan Mahaffey	FB	Northern Iowa	
Baltimore Ravens	Patrick Scales	LS	Utah State	
Buffalo Bills	Danny Aiken	LS	Virginia	
Buffalo Bills	Kamar Aiken	WR	UCF	
Carolina Panthers	Byron Bell	T	New Mexico	
Chicago Bears	Mario Addison	DE	Troy	
Chicago Bears	Corbin Bryant	DT	Northwestern	
Chicago Bears	Dom DeCicco	LB	Pittsburgh	
Chicago Bears	Dane Sanzenbacher	WR	Ohio State	
Cleveland Browns	Ben Jacobs	LB	Fresno State	
Cleveland Browns	Craig Robertson	LB	North Texas	
Dallas Cowboys	Alex Albright	LB	Boston College	
Dallas Cowboys	Dan Bailey ^{†}	K	Oklahoma State	
Dallas Cowboys	Kai Forbath	K	UCLA	
Dallas Cowboys	Chris Jones	P	Carson–Newman	
Dallas Cowboys	Kevin Kowalski	C	Toledo	
Denver Broncos	Chris Harris Jr. ^{†}	CB	Kansas	
Green Bay Packers	M. D. Jennings	S	Arkansas State	
Green Bay Packers	Jamari Lattimore	LB	Middle Tennessee	
Green Bay Packers	Brandian Ross	S	Youngstown State	
Houston Texans	Bryan Braman	LB	West Texas A&M	
Houston Texans	Lestar Jean	WR	Florida Atlantic	
Houston Texans	Jeff Maehl	WR	Oregon	
Indianapolis Colts	Josh McNary	LB	Army	
Indianapolis Colts	Joe Young	S	Rutgers	
Jacksonville Jaguars	Cameron Bradfield	T	Grand Valley State	
Jacksonville Jaguars	DuJuan Harris	RB	Troy	
Jacksonville Jaguars	Dontrelle Inman	WR	Virginia	
Minnesota Vikings	Matt Asiata	RB	Utah	
Minnesota Vikings	Andre Holmes	WR	Hillsdale	
New England Patriots	Jeremy Ross	WR	California	
New Orleans Saints	Isa Abdul-Quddus	FS	Fordham	
New York Giants	Larry Donnell	TE	Grambling State	
New York Giants	Henry Hynoski	FB	Pittsburgh	
New York Giants	Spencer Paysinger	LB	Oregon	
New York Giants	Justin Trattou	DE	Florida	
New York Jets	Josh Baker	TE/FB	Northwest Missouri State	
New York Jets	Nick Bellore ^{†}	LB	Central Michigan	
New York Jets	Julian Posey	CB	Ohio	
Oakland Raiders	Sterling Moore	CB	SMU	
Pittsburgh Steelers	Will Johnson	FB	West Virginia	
Pittsburgh Steelers	Weslye Saunders	TE	South Carolina	
Philadelphia Eagles	Chas Henry	P	Florida	
Philadelphia Eagles	Cedric Thornton	DE	Southern Arkansas	
San Diego Chargers	Patrick DiMarco ^{†}	FB	South Carolina	
San Diego Chargers	Scott Tolzien	QB	Wisconsin	
San Francisco 49ers	Chris Hogan	WR	Monmouth	
San Francisco 49ers	Ian Williams	DT	Notre Dame	
Seattle Seahawks	Doug Baldwin ^{†}	WR	Stanford	
Seattle Seahawks	Mike Morgan	LB	USC	
Seattle Seahawks	Ron Parker	S	Newberry	
St. Louis Rams	Jake McQuaide ^{†}	LS	Ohio State	
Tampa Bay Buccaneers	Mossis Madu	RB	Oklahoma	
Washington Redskins	Shaun Draughn	RB	North Carolina	
Washington Redskins	Willie Smith	T	East Carolina	

== Trades ==
In the explanations below, (D) denotes trades that took place during the draft, while (PD) indicates trades completed pre-draft.

Round 1

Round 2

Round 3

Round 4

Round 5

Round 6

Round 7

== Forfeited picks ==
Two picks were forfeited in the 2011 draft:

== Selections by college conference ==
The players selected in this draft played in the following college football athletic conferences (Division I FBS or FCS unless otherwise indicated):

Rank	Conference	# of players selected
1	Southeastern Conference	38
2	Atlantic Coast Conference	35
3	Pac-10 Conference	31
4	Big 12 Conference	30
5	Big Ten Conference	29
6	Big East Conference	22
7	Western Athletic Conference	16
8	Mountain West Conference	10
9	Conference USA	7
10	Southern Conference	5
10	Sun Belt Conference	5
12	Big Sky Conference	4
13	Mid-American Conference	3
13	Mid-Eastern Athletic Conference	3
15	Colonial Athletic Association	2
15	Lone Star Conference (Division II)	2
15	Missouri Valley Football Conference	2
15	Pennsylvania State Athletic Conference (Division II)	2
15	Southland Conference	2
20	Ivy League	1
20	Mid-South Conference (NAIA)	1
20	Ohio Athletic Conference (Division III)	1
20	Patriot League	1
20	Southwestern Athletic Conference	1
20	Independent	1

== See also ==
- List of first overall National Football League draft picks
- Mr. Irrelevant – last overall National Football League draft picks
