= J. T. Thomas (linebacker) =

American football player (born 1988)

No. 97, 52, 55
- Position: Linebacker

Personal information
- Born: August 15, 1988 (age 38); Fort Lauderdale, Florida, U.S.
- Listed height: 6 ft 1 in (1.85 m)
- Listed weight: 230 lb (104 kg)

Career information
- High school: Blanche Ely (Pompano Beach, Florida)
- College: West Virginia
- NFL draft: 2011: 6th round, 195th overall pick

Career history
- Chicago Bears (2011–2012); Jacksonville Jaguars (2013–2014); New York Giants (2015–2017)

Awards and highlights
- First-team All-Big East (2010)

Career NFL statistics
- Total tackles: 159
- Forced fumbles: 4
- Fumble recoveries: 1
- Interceptions: 2
- Defensive touchdowns: 1
- Stats at Pro Football Reference

J.T. Thomas III (born August 15, 1988) is an American former professional football player who was a linebacker in the National Football League (NFL). He was selected by the Chicago Bears in the sixth round of the 2011 NFL draft. He played college football for the West Virginia Mountaineers.

== Professional career ==
Pre-draft measurables
Height	Weight	Arm length	Hand span	Wingspan	40-yard dash	10-yard split	20-yard split	20-yard shuttle	Three-cone drill	Vertical jump	Broad jump	Bench press
6 ft 1 in (1.85 m)	241 lb (109 kg)	30 1/2 in (0.77 m)	9 1/2 in (0.24 m)	6 ft 2 1/2 in (1.89 m)	4.68 s	1.55 s	2.71 s	4.18 s	7.01 s	33.0 in (0.84 m)	9 ft 6 in (2.90 m)	23 reps
All values from NFL Combine/Pro Day

=== Chicago Bears ===
On July 27, 2011, the Bears signed Thomas to a 4-year contract. Thomas was eventually placed on injured reserve due to a hip problem. In the 2012 season opener against the Indianapolis Colts, Thomas forced LaVon Brazill to fumble, and Kelvin Hayden recovered the loose ball.

On August 31, 2013, Thomas was among the final cuts by the Bears.

=== Jacksonville Jaguars ===
Thomas was claimed off waivers by the Jacksonville Jaguars on September 1, 2013.

=== New York Giants ===
On March 10, 2015, Thomas signed a three-year, $12 million contract with the New York Giants. On December 31, 2015, Thomas was placed on injured reserve.

On September 12, 2016, Thomas was placed on injured reserve after he suffered torn ligaments in his left knee in Week 1 against the Dallas Cowboys.

On September 28, 2017, Thomas was once again placed on injured reserve after suffering a groin injury in Week 2. He was released with an injury settlement on November 28, 2017.

== NFL career statistics ==
Legend
	Led the league
**Bold**	Career high

Year	Team	Games		Tackles					Interceptions					Fumbles			
Year	Team	GP	GS	Cmb	Solo	Ast	Sck	TFL	Int	Yds	TD	Lng	PD	FF	FR	Yds	TD
2012	CHI	**16**	0	5	3	2	0.0	0	0	0	0	0	0	1	0	0	0
2013	JAX	15	2	23	18	5	0.0	**2**	0	0	0	0	0	1	0	0	0
2014	JAX	**16**	10	**85**	**51**	**34**	0.0	**2**	**2**	**10**	0	**10**	**5**	**2**	**1**	0	**1**
2015	NYG	12	**11**	46	30	16	**0.5**	0	0	0	0	0	0	0	0	0	0
2016	NYG	1	0	0	0	0	0.0	0	0	0	0	0	0	0	0	0	0
2017	NYG	2	0	0	0	0	0.0	0	0	0	0	0	0	0	0	0	0
		62	23	159	102	57	0.5	4	2	10	0	10	5	4	1	0	1

== Personal life ==
Thomas has a brother named Jared who has autism. Thomas is a member of Omega Psi Phi fraternity and was initiated through the Nu Zeta chapter at WVU. Thomas attended Blanche Ely High School, where he was teammates with Patrick Peterson.

He gained some national media attention for taking a disabled eighth grade girl in Morgantown, West Virginia to her 8th grade dance on Friday, May 20, 2011. He received more national attention after he gave a 14-year-old boy with epilepsy tickets to Super Bowl XLVI, with Thomas also attending the game.
