= D. C. Jefferson =

American football player (born 1989)

No. 86
- Position: Tight end

Personal information
- Born: May 7, 1989 (age 37); Winter Haven, Florida, U.S.
- Listed height: 6 ft 6 in (1.98 m)
- Listed weight: 255 lb (116 kg)

Career information
- High school: Winter Haven
- College: Rutgers
- NFL draft: 2013: 7th round, 219th overall pick

Career history
- Arizona Cardinals (2013); Carolina Panthers (2014)
- Stats at Pro Football Reference

D. C. Jefferson (born May 7, 1989) is an American former professional football player who was a tight end in the National Football League (NFL). He played college football for the Rutgers Scarlet Knights. He was selected by the Arizona Cardinals in the seventh round of the 2013 NFL draft. Jefferson was released on November 4, 2013, after he was arrested on suspicion of driving under the influence.
