= Bilal Powell =

American football player (born 1988)

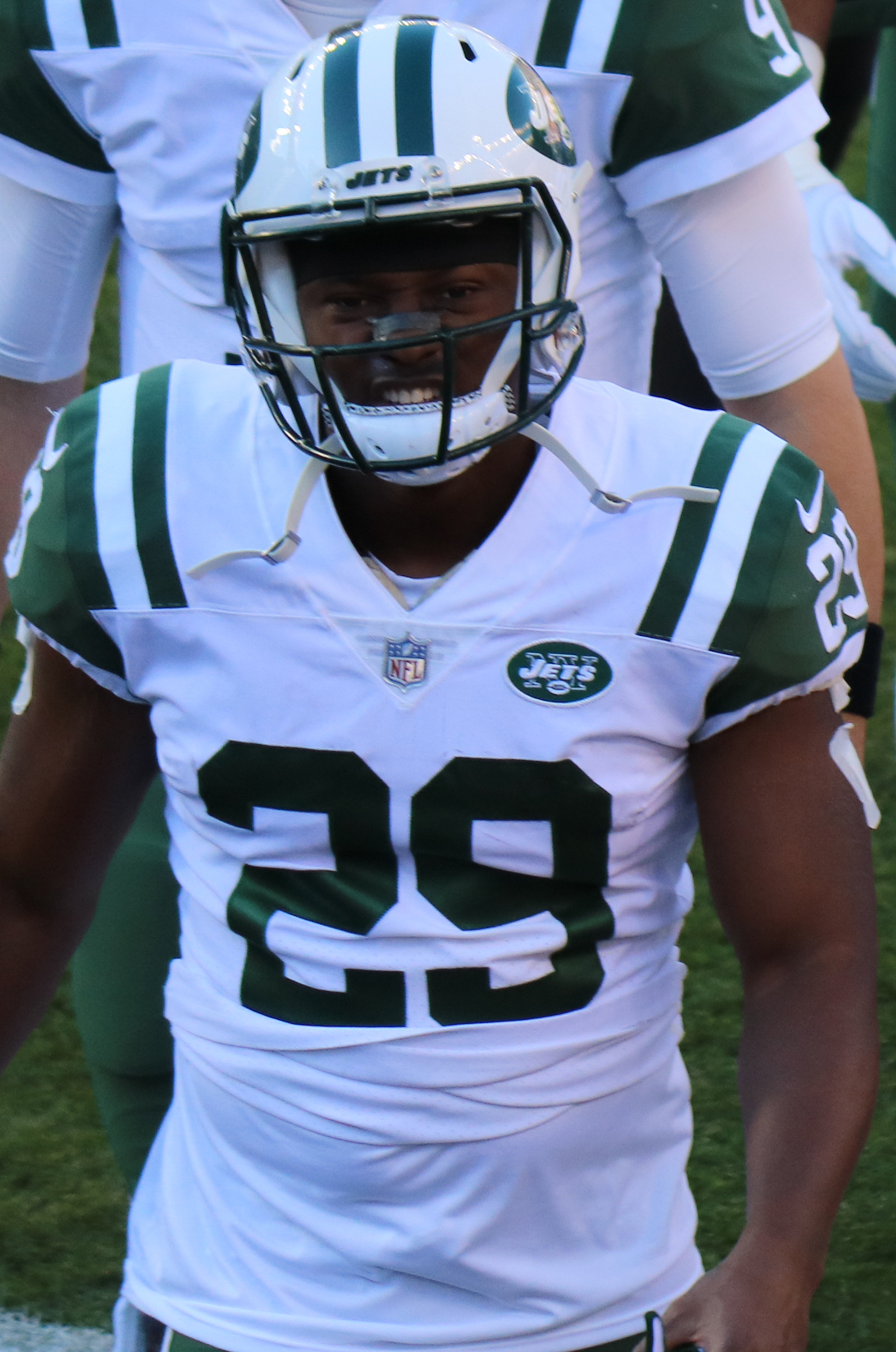
- Powell with the New York Jets in 2017

No. 29
- Position: Running back

Personal information
- Born: October 27, 1988 (age 38); Lakeland, Florida, U.S.
- Listed height: 5 ft 10 in (1.78 m)
- Listed weight: 204 lb (93 kg)

Career information
- High school: Lake Gibson (Lakeland, Florida)
- College: Louisville (2007–2010)
- NFL draft: 2011: 4th round, 126th overall pick

Career history
- New York Jets (2011–2019)

Awards and highlights
- Fourth-team Phil Steele All-American (2010); First-team All-Big East (2010)

Career NFL statistics
- Rushing yards: 3,675
- Rushing average: 4.3
- Rushing touchdowns: 15
- Receptions: 211
- Receiving yards: 1,600
- Receiving touchdowns: 5
- Stats at Pro Football Reference

Bilal Matan Powell (born October 27, 1988) is an American former professional football player who was a running back in the National Football League (NFL). He played college football for the Louisville Cardinals. Selected by the New York Jets in the fourth round of the 2011 NFL draft, Powell played his entire NFL career with the Jets from 2011 to 2019 and ranks among the top running backs in Jets history.

Powell grew up in Lakeland, Florida, where he was an all-state football player at Lake Gibson High School. At the University of Louisville, Powell played for the Louisville Cardinals from 2007 to 2010, completing his college career with 2,338 yards and 19 touchdowns on 436 carries. In his senior season of 2010, Powell earned All-Big East and Phil Steele All-American honors and set a school record at Louisville with 1,405 single-season rushing yards, while helping Louisville win the 2010 Beef 'O' Brady's Bowl.

In 109 games played for the Jets from 2011 to 2019, Powell had 38 starts and rushed for 3,675 yards and 15 touchdowns. In 2016, Powell averaged 5.5 yards per carry, second best league-wide in that category. His most productive season was in 2017, with 772 yards and five touchdowns as a rusher.

== Early life ==
Powell attended and played football for Lake Gibson High School in Lakeland, Florida. A second-team all-state honoree, he received offers from Michigan State and Southern Miss and chose to attend Louisville.

== College career ==
Powell attended and played college football for the University of Louisville from 2007 to 2010. Powell completed his Bachelor of Science degree at Louisville in the summer of 2017.

=== 2007 season ===
As a freshman, Powell contributed on offense and special teams. He was part of a shared backfield that included Anthony Allen, Brock Bolen, George Striping, and Sergio Spencer. On October 27, he had 25 rushing yards and ten receiving yards against Pitt. His role expanded in the game against South Florida with 70 rushing yards, one rushing touchdown, two receptions, 15 receiving yards, and six returns for 141 net yards. In his final appearance of his freshman season, he had 91 rushing yards, one rushing touchdown, and seven kick returns for 178 net yards against Rutgers.

=== 2008 season ===
As a sophomore, Powell continued to contribute for the Cardinals. He became the third running back behind Vic Anderson and Brock Bolen. On September 26, he had 112 rushing yards and a touchdown against Connecticut. On November 22, against West Virginia, he had 77 rushing yards and a rushing touchdown.

=== 2009 season ===
As a junior, Powell led the team in rushes. He, Darius Ashley, and Vic Anderson dominated the share of carries for the Cardinals. In the season opener against Indiana State, he had 76 rushing yards and a rushing touchdown. On October 17, against Connecticut, he had 87 rushing yards and two rushing touchdowns to go along with three receptions for 15 yards. On Halloween, against Arkansas State, he had season-highs with 93 rushing yards and 31 receiving yards.

=== 2010 season ===
As a senior, Powell dominated the carries for the Cardinals. In the season opener against Kentucky, he had 153 rushing yards and a rushing touchdown. He followed that up with 92 rushing yards and two rushing touchdowns against Eastern Kentucky. In the next game, he had 83 rushing yards, a rushing touchdown, and 21 receiving yards against Oregon State. In the following game against Arkansas State, he had 157 rushing yards, one rushing touchdown, 65 receiving yards, and one receiving touchdown. On October 9, against Memphis, he had 204 rushing yards and two rushing touchdowns. On October 15, he ran for a season-high of 209 yards and 2 touchdowns against Cincinnati. He followed that up with 105 rushing yards against Connecticut in the next game. On November 13, against South Florida, he had 140 rushing yards. On November 26, against Rutgers, he had 123 rushing yards, one rushing touchdown, 28 receiving yards, and two receiving touchdowns in the victory. In the final game of his collegiate career, he had 75 rushing yards and a rushing touchdown in the victory over Southern Miss in the 2010 Beef 'O' Brady's Bowl. He was named to the All-Big East Conference first-team and Phil Steele All-American fourth team after rushing for 1,405 yards and 10 touchdowns in 11 games for the Cardinals. His 1,405 single season rushing yards set a new school record for second all time. Prior to the 2011 NFL draft, Powell was invited to the 2011 Senior Bowl.

== Professional career ==
Pre-draft measurables
Height	Weight	Arm length	Hand span	Wingspan	40-yard dash	10-yard split	20-yard split	Bench press
5 ft 10 1/2 in (1.79 m)	207 lb (94 kg)	30 7/8 in (0.78 m)	8 3/4 in (0.22 m)	6 ft 0 3/8 in (1.84 m)	4.51 s	1.53 s	2.64 s	18 reps
All values from NFL Combine/Pro Day

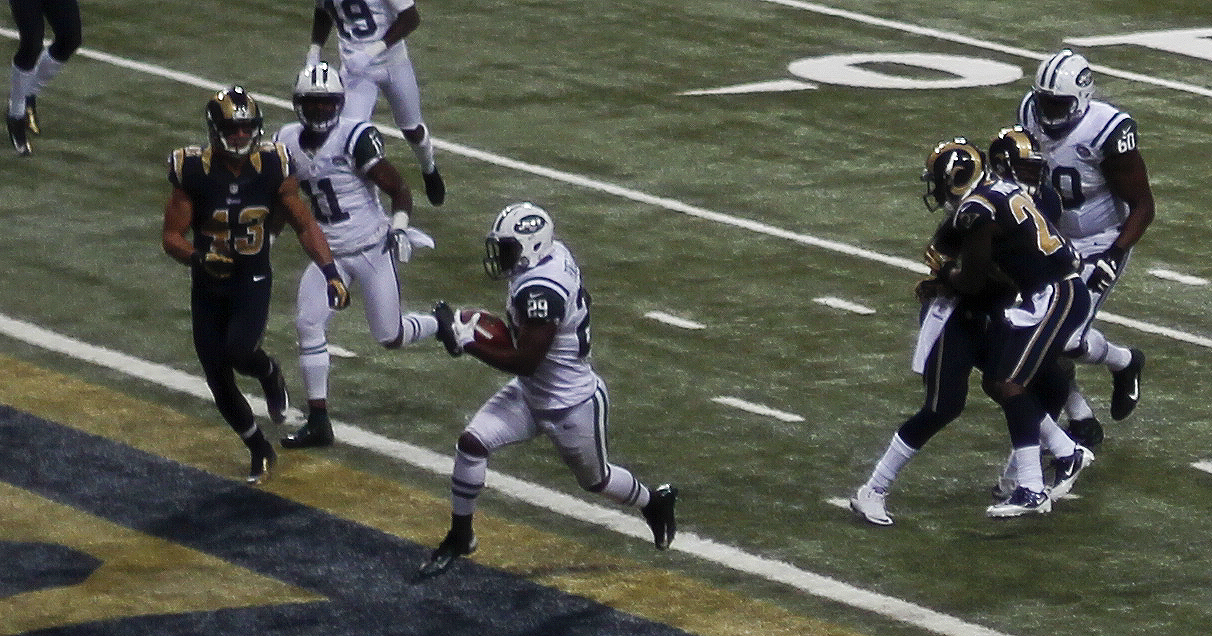
Powell running against the St. Louis Rams in 2012

=== 2011 season ===
Powell was selected by the New York Jets in the fourth round with the 126th overall selection in the 2011 NFL Draft. He was the 14th running back to be selected that year.

On July 29, 2011, Powell signed a 4-year rookie contract worth $3,226,500 with $400,500 guaranteed.

Powell made his NFL debut on November 17, 2011, against the Denver Broncos. Powell would finish the 2011 season by playing in only two games. In those two games, Powell ran for 21 yards on 13 attempts and had one reception for 7 yards.

=== 2012 season ===
On November 18, 2012, Powell ran for 42 yards on 11 carries and a season-high two touchdowns against the St. Louis Rams, his first multiple-touchdown game of his career. On November 22, 2012, Powell ran for 40 yards on 12 carries and a touchdown against the New England Patriots. On December 2, 2012, Powell ran for 58 yards on 12 carries against the Arizona Cardinals. On December 9, 2012, Powell ran for a season-high 78 yards on 19 carries and a touchdown against the Jacksonville Jaguars. Powell scored his fourth touchdown of the season, and also had a season-high in carries. Powell finished his second professional season running for 437 yards on 110 carries and 4 touchdowns and catching 17 passes for 140 yards.

=== 2013 season ===
On September 22, 2013, Powell ran for 149 yards on 27 carries and a touchdown against the Buffalo Bills. On September 29, Powell ran for 66 yards on 14 carries against the Tennessee Titans. On December 22, 2013, Powell recorded a 39-yard run against the Cleveland Browns. On December 29, 2013, Powell ran for 76 yards on 21 carries against the Miami Dolphins. Powell also threw a pass to tight end Jeff Cumberland for 30 yards. Powell finished the 2013 season with 697 rushing yards on 176 carries and a touchdown and 272 receiving yards on 36 passes.

=== 2014 season ===
On October 26, 2014, Powell ran for his only touchdown of the season against the Buffalo Bills. Powell finished the 2014 season with 141 rushing yards on 33 carries and 92 receiving yards on 11 catches.

=== 2015 season ===
On March 14, 2015, Powell signed a one-year, $2 million contract with the New York Jets.

In Week 13, Powell had 108 scrimmage yards in a 23–20 win over the New York Giants. He finished the 2015 season with 313 rushing yards on 70 carries and a touchdown and 388 receiving yards on 47 catches and two touchdowns.

=== 2016 season ===
On March 10, 2016, Powell signed a three-year, $11,250,000 contract with the New York Jets.

On September 11, 2016, Powell ran for 41 yards on 4 carries in the season-opener against the Cincinnati Bengals. On September 25, Powell caught 6 passes for 41 yards against the Kansas City Chiefs. On October 2, Powell caught six passes for 54 yards against the Seattle Seahawks. On October 30, he ran for 76 yards on 6 carries and a touchdown against the Cleveland Browns. His 35-yard touchdown was the longest Jets touchdown run since Chris Ivory ran 71-yards in 2014 against the Oakland Raiders,. On November 13, Powell caught seven passes for 52 yards and a touchdown against the Los Angeles Rams. He was able to score the touchdown on a lateral trick play. On December 11, he ran for a season-high 145 yards on 29 carries and two touchdowns against the San Francisco 49ers. His two touchdowns were a 5-yard score and a 19-yard score, which was the game-winning touchdown in overtime. This was his first 100-yard game of the season, and the second of his career while he also became only the second Jets player since 1975 to rush for at least 145 yards and at least two touchdowns in a road game. Powell's 19-yard touchdown in overtime was the first rushing touchdown in overtime in team history. Overall, in the 2016 season, he finished with 722 rushing yards, three rushing touchdowns, 58 receptions, 388 receiving yards, and two receiving touchdowns. His 5.5 yards per carry ranked second in the NFL.

=== 2017 season ===
During Week 4 against the Jacksonville Jaguars, Powell rushed for 163 yards, including one for a 75-yard touchdown, as the Jets won 23–20 in overtime. In Week 16, against the Los Angeles Chargers, he had 145 rushing yards and a rushing touchdown. Overall, in the 2017 season, he finished with a career-high 772 rushing yards, five rushing touchdowns, 23 receptions, and 170 receiving yards.

=== 2018 season ===
Powell started the first seven games of the season, recording 343 rushing yards with no touchdowns along with 11 receptions for 110 yards and one touchdown. He suffered a neck injury in Week 7 and was placed on injured reserve on October 24, 2018.

=== 2019 season ===
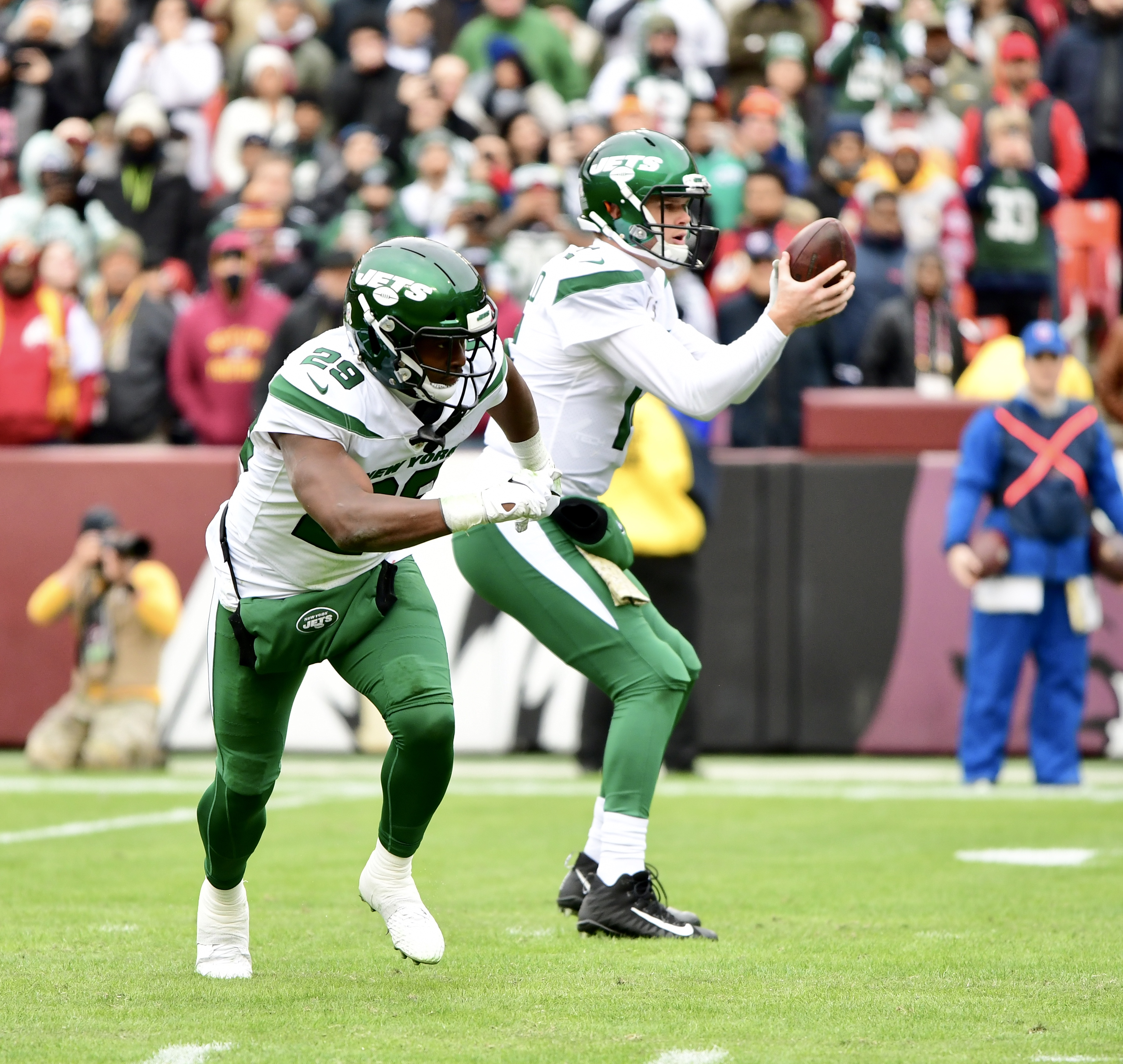
Powell in a game against the Washington Redskins

On June 7, 2019, Powell re-signed with the Jets. In the 2019 season, Powell appeared in 13 games, of which he started one, and recorded 59 carries for 229 rushing yards. In November 2019, Powell was the longest-tenured active member of the New York Jets. Powell became a free agent in 2020; he expressed a desire to stay with the team through the end of his NFL career. He left the Jets with a career total of 3,675 rushing yards with 15 touchdowns, the eighth most rushing yards in team history.

After being unsigned in 2020 and 2021, Powell signed a one-day contract on April 26, 2022, to retire with the Jets.

== Career statistics ==
=== NFL ===
Year	Team	Games		Rushing						Receiving				Fumbles	
Year	Team	GP	GS	Att	Yds	Avg	Y/G	Lng	TD	Rec	Yds	Lng	TD	Fum	Lost
2011	NYJ	2	0	13	21	1.6	10.5	6	0	1	7	7	0	1	0
2012	NYJ	14	2	110	437	4.0	31.2	18	4	17	140	16	0	0	0
2013	NYJ	16	11	176	697	4.0	43.6	39	1	36	272	36	0	1	0
2014	NYJ	15	1	33	141	4.3	9.4	15	1	11	92	20	0	0	0
2015	NYJ	11	2	70	313	4.5	28.5	24	1	47	388	25	2	2	0
2016	NYJ	16	4	131	722	5.5	45.1	35	3	58	388	22	2	1	1
2017	NYJ	15	10	178	772	4.3	51.5	75	5	23	170	31	0	1	1
2018	NYJ	7	7	80	343	4.3	49.0	38	0	11	110	28	1	2	1
2019	NYJ	13	1	59	229	3.9	17.6	17	0	7	33	9	0	0	0
Career		109	38	850	3,675	4.3	33.7	75	15	211	1,600	36	5	8	3

=== College ===
Season	Team	Rushing				Receiving		
Season	Team	Att	Yds	Avg	TD	Rec	Yds	TD
2007	Louisville	24	187	7.8	2	3	25	0
2008	Louisville	75	354	4.7	2	12	58	0
2009	Louisville	108	392	3.6	4	12	103	0
2010	Louisville	229	1,405	6.1	11	18	158	3
Total		436	2,338	5.4	19	45	344	3

== Personal life ==
Powell is a Christian. Powell is married and has three children.

Powell currently is an assistant football coach at Trinity High School in Louisville, KY.
