= 2010 Beef 'O' Brady's Bowl =

- 3rd Beef 'O' Brady's Bowl
Southern Miss Golden Eagles	Louisville Cardinals
(8–4)	(6–6)
C-USA	Big East
28	31
Head coach: Larry Fedora	Head coach: Charlie Strong
	1	2	3	4	Total
Southern Miss	14	7	0	7	28
Louisville	0	21	0	10	31
- Date: December 21, 2010
- Season: 2010
- Stadium: Tropicana Field
- Location: St. Petersburg, Florida
- MVP: KR Jeremy Wright, Louisville
- Favorite: Louisville by 2.5
- Referee: Charles Lewis (Sun Belt)
- Attendance: 20,017
- Payout: US$1 million

United States TV coverage
- Network: ESPN
- Announcers: Rece Davis, Lou Holtz, Mark May and Rob Stone
- Nielsen ratings: 2.0 / 2.99M

The 2010 Beef 'O' Brady's Bowl was the third edition of the college football bowl game formerly known as the St. Petersburg Bowl. This was the first edition of the bowl named after the Beef O'Brady's restaurant franchise. It was played at Tropicana Field in St. Petersburg, Florida, on Tuesday, December 21, 2010 at 8 p.m. (ET). The game was telecast on ESPN and featured the Southern Miss Golden Eagles from Conference USA (C-USA) versus the Louisville Cardinals from the Big East Conference.

== Teams ==
The two teams were not strangers to one another, having both played in the same conference, as Louisville was a member of C-USA from 1996 through 2004. Southern Miss entered the game with an 18–9–1 series lead. The teams had played each other in a non-conference matchup during the 2009 season, with Louisville winning at home, 25–23. This was the first time that the two schools had played each other in a bowl game.

=== Southern Miss ===
The Golden Eagles went to their ninth straight bowl game, the league's second longest active bowl streak. This was their first bowl trip to Florida in 29 years since playing Missouri in the 1981 Tangerine Bowl in Orlando. Although the 2010 season proved to be a successful one on the field for the Golden Eagles, the most memorable public event was when three players were shot after a fight at a club spilled outside to the parking lot. Linebacker Martez Smith suffered the most serious injury, and is paralyzed from the waist down. The Golden Eagles went 1–1 following the tragic events, winning over Houston but losing a shootout to Tulsa.

=== Louisville ===
Under first year coach Charlie Strong the Cardinals returned to their first bowl game since the end of the 2006 season when they appeared in the Orange Bowl. Louisville entered the contest with a 6–6 record after defeating Rutgers to become bowl eligible. The Cardinals' defense ranked 12th in the nation in total defense during the regular season. Louisville had gone to eight bowl games in nine years but had been absent from bowl play for the three seasons immediately preceding 2010.

== Game summary ==
=== Scoring ===
Scoring Play	Score
1st Quarter
USM – Austin Davis 32-yard pass to Quentin Pierce (Danny Hrapmann kick), 12:06	USM 7–0
USM – Desmond Johnson 62-yard run (Danny Hrapmann kick), 10:12	USM 14–0
2nd Quarter
LOU – Justin Burke 11-yard pass to Cameron Graham (Chris Philpott kick), 11:21	USM 14–7
USM – Quentin Pierce 17-yard pass to Austin Davis (Danny Hrapmann kick), 9:15	USM 21–7
LOU – Justin Burke 10-yard pass to Josh Chichester (Chris Philpott kick), 4:24	USM 21–14
LOU – Bilal Powell 6-yard run (Chris Philpott kick), 1:18	TIE 21–21
3rd Quarter
No scoring	TIE 21–21
4th Quarter
USM – Austin Davis 8-yard pass to Zeke Walters (Danny Hrapmann kick), 14:55	USM 28–21
LOU – Jeremy Wright 94-yard kickoff return (Chris Philpott kick), 14:40	TIE 28–28
LOU – Chris Philpott 36-yard field goal, 6:30	LOU 31–28

=== Statistics ===
Statistics	Southern Miss	Louisville
First downs	24	15
Total offense, plays – yards	74-386	61-286
Rushes-yards (net)	41-159	29-110
Passing yards (net)	227	176
Passes, Comp-Att-Int	21-33-0	20-32-0
Time of Possession	28:47	31:13
