= 2010 West Virginia Mountaineers football team =

American college football season

2010 West Virginia Mountaineers football

Big East co-champion

Champs Sports Bowl, L 7–23 vs. NC State
- Conference: Big East Conference
- Record: 9–4 (5–2 Big East)
- Head coach: Bill Stewart (3rd season)
- Offensive coordinator: Jeff Mullen (3rd season)
- Offensive scheme: Spread
- Defensive coordinator: Jeff Casteel (9th season)
- Base defense: 3–3–5
- MVPs: Jock Sanders (offense); Chris Neild (defense); Brandon Hogan (defense)
- Captains: Noel Devine; Jock Sanders; Chris Neild; J. T. Thomas
- Home stadium: Milan Puskar Stadium

2010 Big East Conference football standings
	Conf.			Overall
Team	W		L	W		L
Connecticut $+	5	–	2	8	–	5
West Virginia +	5	–	2	9	–	4
Pittsburgh +	5	–	2	8	–	5
Syracuse	4	–	3	8	–	5
South Florida	3	–	4	8	–	5
Louisville	3	–	4	7	–	6
Cincinnati	2	–	5	4	–	8
Rutgers	1	–	6	4	–	8
$ – BCS representative as conference champion; + – Conference co-champions; Rankings from AP Poll

The 2010 West Virginia Mountaineers football team represented West Virginia University as a member of the Big East Conference during the 2010 NCAA Division I FBS football season. Led by Bill Stewart in his third and final season as head coach, the Mountaineers compiled an overall record of 9–4 with a mark of 5–2 in conference play, sharing the Big East title with Connecticut and Pittsburgh. Connecticut earned the conference's Bowl Championship Series (BCS) berth via a tiebreaker. West Virginia was invited the Champs Sports Bowl, where the Mountaineers lost to NC State. The team played home games at Milan Puskar Stadium in Morgantown, West Virginia.

== Schedule ==
Date	Time	Opponent	Rank	Site	TV	Result	Attendance	Source
September 4	3:30 p.m.	Coastal Carolina*	No. 25	Milan Puskar Stadium; Morgantown, WV	ESPN Plus	W 31–0	57,867	
September 10	7:00 p.m.	at Marshall*	No. 23	Joan C. Edwards Stadium; Huntington, WV (Friends of Coal Bowl)	ESPN	W 24–21 ^{OT}	41,382	
September 18	12:00 p.m.	Maryland*	No. 21	Milan Puskar Stadium; Morgantown, WV	ESPNU	W 31–17	60,122	
September 25	9:15 p.m.	at No. 15 LSU*	No. 22	Tiger Stadium; Baton Rouge, LA	ESPN2	L 14–20	92,575	
October 9	3:30 p.m.	UNLV*		Milan Puskar Stadium; Morgantown, WV	ESPN Plus	W 49–10	58,234	
October 14	7:30 p.m.	South Florida	No. 25	Milan Puskar Stadium; Morgantown, WV (Gold Rush)	ESPN	W 20–6	54,955	
October 23	12:00 p.m.	Syracuse^{†}	No. 20	Milan Puskar Stadium; Morgantown, WV (rivalry)	ESPN2	L 14–19	58,122	
October 29	8:00 p.m.	at Connecticut		Rentschler Field; East Hartford, CT	ESPN2	L 13–16 ^{OT}	40,000	
November 13	12:00 p.m.	Cincinnati		Milan Puskar Stadium; Morgantown, WV	ESPN Plus	W 37–10	56,593	
November 20	12:00 p.m.	at Louisville		Papa John's Cardinal Stadium; Louisville, KY	ESPN Plus	W 17–10	51,772	
November 26	12:00 p.m.	at Pittsburgh		Heinz Field; Pittsburgh, PA (Backyard Brawl)	ABC	W 35–10	60,562	
December 4	12:00 p.m.	Rutgers	No. 23	Milan Puskar Stadium; Morgantown, WV	ABC	W 35–14	48,386	
December 28	6:30 p.m.	NC State*	No. 22	Florida Citrus Bowl; Orlando, FL (Champs Sports Bowl)	ESPN	L 7–23	48,962	
*Non-conference game; ^{†}Homecoming; Rankings from AP Poll released prior to the game; All times are in Eastern time

== Rankings ==
Ranking movements Legend: ██ Increase in ranking ██ Decrease in ranking — = Not ranked RV = Received votes
	Week															
Poll	Pre	1	2	3	4	5	6	7	8	9	10	11	12	13	14	Final
AP	25	23	21	22	RV	RV	25	20	RV	—	—	—	RV	23	22	RV
Coaches	24	22	21	21	RV	RV	25	19	RV	—	—	—	RV	24	22	RV
Harris	Not released						25	19	RV	—	—	—	RV	23	21	Not released
BCS	Not released							20	—	—	—	—	—	24	22	Not released

== Game summaries ==
=== Coastal Carolina ===
	1	2	3	4	Total
Chanticleers	0	0	0	0	0
No. 25 Mountaineers	7	3	14	7	31

=== Marshall ===
	1	2	3	4	OT	Total
No. 23 Mountaineers	3	0	3	15	3	24
Thundering Herd	7	7	0	7	0	21

Facing a 21–6 fourth-quarter deficit, West Virginia outscored Marshall 15–0 on drives of 96 and 98 yards in the final 8:28 of the game. In overtime WVU took the lead with a field goal and won 24–21 when Marshall's kicker Tyler Warner missed a 39-yard field goal attempt. The comeback win was significant because the loss would have marked Marshall's first-ever win in the series.

=== Maryland ===
	1	2	3	4	Total
Terrapins	0	0	14	3	17
No. 21 Mountaineers	14	7	7	3	31

=== LSU ===
	1	2	3	4	Total
No. 22 Mountaineers	0	7	7	0	14
No. 15 Tigers	7	10	0	3	20

=== UNLV ===
	1	2	3	4	Total
Rebels	0	0	3	7	10
Mountaineers	21	14	7	7	49

=== South Florida ===
	1	2	3	4	Total
Bulls	0	3	3	0	6
No. 25 Mountaineers	10	7	3	0	20

=== Syracuse ===
	1	2	3	4	Total
Orange	10	9	0	0	19
No. 20 Mountaineers	14	0	0	0	14

WVU lost their homecoming game to Syracuse after winning eight straight in the series. The loss, which saw Geno Smith throw three interceptions (after throwing only two all season), broke the Mountaineers' 12-game home winning streak and dropped the team out of the BCS standings. Coming into the game, West Virginia was the only ranked team in the Big East.

=== Connecticut ===
	1	2	3	4	OT	Total
Mountaineers	10	0	3	0	0	13
Huskies	0	3	7	3	3	16

West Virginia lost to Connecticut for the first time in history after WVU's Ryan Clarke fumbled at the UConn one yard line and Connecticut's Dave Teggart kicked the game-winning, 27-yard field goal in overtime. After the loss, the WVU coaching staff received criticism from fans and the media over the team's offensive struggles in two consecutive Big East conference games against Syracuse and the Huskies.

=== Cincinnati ===
	1	2	3	4	Total
Bearcats	0	3	7	0	10
Mountaineers	14	16	7	0	37

After losing two consecutive conference games, the Mountaineers needed to win against the Bearcats to stay in the Big East race. The Mountaineers snapped a two-game losing skid against Cincinnati by getting off to a quick start behind Geno Smith's four first-half touchdown passes.

=== Louisville ===
	1	2	3	4	Total
Mountaineers	7	7	3	0	17
Cardinals	3	7	0	0	10

The Mountaineers stayed in contention for the Big East title by winning 17–10 on the road in a contest highlighted by defensive performances. The West Virginia defense, at the time ranked 4th in the country and first in the Big East Conference, held the Big East's best rushing team (averaging 192 yards per game) to a total of 26 yards on the ground. The defense allowed only 3 offensive points—the other 7 coming off a Louisville fumble recovery in the end zone—and held the Cardinals to 2 of 13 on 3rd-down conversions. However, the WVU offense failed to score a second-half touchdown for the fourth time in its five conference games. The Mountaineers also remained scoreless in the fourth quarter in Big East play.

=== Pittsburgh ===
	1	2	3	4	Total
Mountaineers	7	7	14	7	35
Panthers	7	0	3	0	10

In the 103rd edition of the Backyard Brawl, the Mountaineers remained in contention for the Big East's BCS Bowl bid by winning 35–10 at Heinz Field. Pittsburgh controlled its own destiny, and needed to win its last two games to claim the Big East title and BCS bowl berth outright, but the West Virginia defense forced 4 turnovers off of 6 Panther fumbles and an interception to defeat Pitt for the second year in a row. The West Virginia offense, plagued by poor performances in the second half of its previous Big East games, showed improvement by totaling 21 points in the second half and breaking its scoreless streak in the fourth quarter of conference games. The momentum heavily favored the Mountaineers after Geno Smith threw a 71-yard touchdown pass to Tavon Austin to make the score 21–7 in the third quarter. Following the win, the Mountaineers appeared in the top 25 rankings, listed 24 in the BCS and 23 in the AP, for the first time since their home loss to Syracuse over a month earlier.

=== Rutgers ===
	1	2	3	4	Total
Scarlet Knights	0	7	0	7	14
No. 24 Mountaineers	7	7	7	14	35

Geno Smith threw for a career-high 352 yards, Ryan Clarke had three short touchdown runs, and No. 23 West Virginia overcame turnover problems to beat the Scarlet Knights 35–14 to clinch a share of the Big East title. It marked the fifth shared or outright Big East title for the Mountaineers since 2003. Smith finished the season with 2,567 passing yards and 22 TDs. Both are the second most in school history behind Marc Bulger's 3,607 yards and 31 TDs in 1998. WVU extended its winning streak over Rutgers to 15, and have never lost to the Scarlet Knights in Morgantown. After defeating Rutgers in the regular season finale, WVU needed a UCONN loss to obtain berth in a BCS bowl. The Huskies defeated South Florida later that evening, and despite winning a share of the Big East title, the Mountaineers lost the head-to-head tiebreaker with Connecticut, who received the conference's BCS bowl bid.
