= 2010 South Florida Bulls football team =

American college football season

2010 South Florida Bulls football

Meineke Car Care Bowl champion

Meineke Car Care Bowl, W 31–26 vs. Clemson
- Conference: Big East Conference
- Record: 8–5 (3–4 Big East)
- Head coach: Skip Holtz (1st season)
- Offensive coordinator: Todd Fitch (1st season)
- Offensive scheme: Multiple
- Defensive coordinator: Mark Snyder (1st season)
- Base defense: 3–4
- Home stadium: Raymond James Stadium

2010 Big East Conference football standings
	Conf.			Overall
Team	W		L	W		L
Connecticut $+	5	–	2	8	–	5
West Virginia +	5	–	2	9	–	4
Pittsburgh +	5	–	2	8	–	5
Syracuse	4	–	3	8	–	5
South Florida	3	–	4	8	–	5
Louisville	3	–	4	7	–	6
Cincinnati	2	–	5	4	–	8
Rutgers	1	–	6	4	–	8
$ – BCS representative as conference champion; + – Conference co-champions; Rankings from AP Poll

The 2010 South Florida Bulls football team represented the University of South Florida (USF) as a member of the Big East Conference during the 2010 NCAA Division I FBS football season. Led by first-year head coach Skip Holtz, the Bulls compiled an overall record of 8–5 with a mark of 3–4 in conference play, tying for fifth place in the Big East. South Florida invited to the Meineke Car Care Bowl to face the Clemson Tigers. This was the sixth consecutive season that the Bulls had gone to a postseason bowl game. South Florida defeated Clemson, 31–26, securing a third straight bowl victory for the Bulls. Quarterback BJ Daniels was named the MVP of the game. The Bulls played home games at Raymond James Stadium in Tampa, Florida.

This was the first season without the program's first head coach, Jim Leavitt, who was fired January 8, 2010. On April 17, 2010, South Florida held its annual intrasquad spring football game at Raymond James Stadium. 'Team South Florida' defeated 'Team Bulls' by a score of 49–31, in front of a record crowd of 6,357. On November 3, South Florida defeated Rutgers, 28–27, for the 100th victory in program history.

== Schedule ==
Date	Time	Opponent	Site	TV	Result	Attendance	Source
September 4	7:00 p.m.	Stony Brook*	Raymond James Stadium; Tampa, FL	BHSN	W 59–14	40,201	
September 11	12:21 p.m.	at No. 8 Florida*	Ben Hill Griffin Stadium; Gainesville, FL	SEC Network	L 14–38	90,612	
September 25	7:00 p.m.	Western Kentucky*	Raymond James Stadium; Tampa, FL	Big East Network	W 24–12	40,206	
October 2	7:00 p.m.	Florida Atlantic*	Raymond James Stadium; Tampa, FL (rivalry)	Big East Network	W 31–3	38,434	
October 9	12:00 p.m.	Syracuse^{†}	Raymond James Stadium; Tampa, FL	Big East Network	L 9–13	41,917	
October 14	7:30 p.m.	at No. 25 West Virginia	Milan Puskar Stadium; Morgantown, WV	ESPN	L 6–20	54,955	
October 22	8:00 p.m.	at Cincinnati	Nippert Stadium; Cincinnati, OH	ESPN2	W 38–30	32,670	
November 3	7:00 p.m.	Rutgers	Raymond James Stadium; Tampa, FL	ESPN2	W 28–27	39,465	
November 13	12:00 p.m.	at Louisville	Papa John's Cardinal Stadium; Louisville, KY	ESPNU	W 24–21 ^{OT}	43,887	
November 20	12:00 p.m.	Pittsburgh	Raymond James Stadium; Tampa, FL	ESPN2	L 10–17	43,844	
November 27	12:00 p.m.	at Miami (FL)*	Sun Life Stadium; Miami Gardens, FL	ESPNU	W 23–20 ^{OT}	41,148	
December 4	8:00 p.m.	Connecticut	Raymond James Stadium; Tampa, FL	ESPN2	L 16–19	41,809	
December 31	12:00 p.m.	vs. Clemson*	Bank of America Stadium; Charlotte, NC (Meineke Car Care Bowl)	ESPN	W 31–26	41,122	
*Non-conference game; ^{†}Homecoming; Rankings from AP Poll released prior to the game; All times are in Eastern time
