= 2010 Syracuse Orange football team =

American college football season

2010 Syracuse Orange football

Pinstripe Bowl champion

Pinstripe Bowl, W 36–34 vs. Kansas State
- Conference: Big East Conference
- Record: 8–5 (4–3 Big East)
- Head coach: Doug Marrone (2nd season)
- Offensive scheme: Pro-style
- Defensive coordinator: Scott Shafer (2nd season)
- Base defense: 4–3
- Home stadium: Carrier Dome

2010 Big East Conference football standings
	Conf.			Overall
Team	W		L	W		L
Connecticut $+	5	–	2	8	–	5
West Virginia +	5	–	2	9	–	4
Pittsburgh +	5	–	2	8	–	5
Syracuse	4	–	3	8	–	5
South Florida	3	–	4	8	–	5
Louisville	3	–	4	7	–	6
Cincinnati	2	–	5	4	–	8
Rutgers	1	–	6	4	–	8
$ – BCS representative as conference champion; + – Conference co-champions; Rankings from AP Poll

The 2010 Syracuse Orange football team represented Syracuse University in the 2010 NCAA Division I FBS football season. The Orange were led by head coach Doug Marrone in his second season. They played their home games at Carrier Dome and were members of the Big East Conference. For the first time since Paul Pasqualoni was fired following the 2004 season, the Orange won enough games to become bowl eligible. Syracuse played Kansas State in the Inaugural Pinstripe Bowl at Yankee Stadium where they won 36–34 to finish the season 8–5, 4–3 in Big East play.

== Schedule ==
Date	Time	Opponent	Site	TV	Result	Attendance
September 4	6:00 pm	at Akron*	InfoCision Stadium–Summa Field; Akron, OH	ESPN3	W 29–3	15,969
September 11	7:00 pm	at Washington*	Husky Stadium; Seattle, WA	FSNNW	L 20–41	62,418
September 18	7:15 pm	Maine*	Carrier Dome; Syracuse, NY	TWCSN	W 38–14	37,758
September 25	3:30 pm	Colgate*	Carrier Dome; Syracuse, Y	ESPN3	W 42–7	38,068
October 9	12:00 pm	at South Florida	Raymond James Stadium; Tampa, FL	Big East Network	W 13–9	41,917
October 16	12:00 pm	Pittsburgh^{†}	Carrier Dome; Syracuse, NY (rivalry)	Big East Network	L 14–45	40,168
October 23	12:00 pm	at No. 20 West Virginia	Milan Puskar Stadium; Morgantown, WV (rivalry)	ESPN2	W 19–14	58,122
October 30	12:00 pm	at Cincinnati	Nippert Stadium; Cincinnati, OH	ESPNU	W 31–7	32,072
November 6	12:00 pm	Louisville	Carrier Dome; Syracuse, NT	Big East Network	L 20–28	40,735
November 13	3:30 pm	at Rutgers	Rutgers Stadium; Piscataway, NJ	ESPNU	W 13–10	49,911
November 20	7:00 pm	Connecticut	Carrier Dome; Syracuse, NY (rivalry)	ESPNU	L 6–23	41,635
November 27	12:00 pm	Boston College*	Carrier Dome; Syracuse, NY	ESPN	L 7–16	42,191
December 30	3:00 pm	vs. Kansas State*	Yankee Stadium; Bronx, NY (Pinstripe Bowl)	ESPN	W 36–34	38,274
*Non-conference game; ^{†}Homecoming; Rankings from AP Poll released prior to the game; All times are in Eastern time
