= 2011 BBVA Compass Bowl =

Pittsburgh Panthers	Kentucky Wildcats
(7–5)	(6–6)
Big East	SEC
27	10
Head coach: Phil Bennett (interim)	Head coach: Joker Phillips
	1	2	3	4	Total
Pittsburgh	0	13	7	7	27
Kentucky	3	0	7	0	10
- Date: January 8, 2011
- Season: 2010
- Stadium: Legion Field
- Location: Birmingham, Alabama
- Favorite: Pitt by 3
- Referee: Tom DeJoseph (ACC)
- Attendance: 41,207
- Payout: US$1 million (SEC); $900,000 (Big East)

United States TV coverage
- Network: ESPN
- Announcers: Mike Gleason and John Congemi

The 2011 BBVA Compass Bowl (formerly known as the Papajohns.com Bowl and the Birmingham Bowl) was a postseason college football bowl game between a team from the Big East Conference and a team from the SEC played at Legion Field in Birmingham, Alabama on January 8, 2011 (12 p.m. ET). ESPN provided television coverage.

The game was initially renamed "The Birmingham Bowl" after previous title sponsor PapaJohns.com decided not to renew their sponsorship of the game. However, on November 4, 2010, the Bowl officially changed its name to the BBVA Compass Bowl after an agreement with Spanish bank Banco Bilbao Vizcaya Argentaria was signed.

Scoring 13 points in the second quarter, Pittsburgh defeated Kentucky 27–10.

== Teams ==
Pittsburgh (7-5, 5-2 Big East) was selected to play Kentucky (6-6, 2-6 SEC) in the game.

=== Pittsburgh ===
Pitt started the season 2-3, which came as a surprise to many after Pitt was listed as the favorite to win the 2010 Big East Football Conference championship. The Panthers received 22 of 24 possible first-place votes, and 2 second-place votes. After their slow start, the Panthers rebounded, winning 4 out of their next 5 games, improving their record to 6-4. The Panthers ended the season at 8-5 and finished as Big East Co-Champions, along with West Virginia and Connecticut. However, because of the Panthers' losses to both schools, they were not eligible for the conference's bid to a BCS Bowl Game.

=== Kentucky ===
The Wildcats began the season by winning their first 3 games, all against non-conference teams. Over the span of the next 6 games, the Wildcats won only a single game, reducing their record to 4-5. They then split the last 4 games of the season, finishing it at 6-6, good for 5th in the Eastern Division of the Southeastern Conference.

== Game summary ==
=== Scoring summary ===
Scoring play	Score
1st quarter
UK – Craig McIntosh 50-yard field goal, 03:15	UK 3–0
2nd quarter
PITT - Dan Hutchins 21-yard field goal, 11:29	TIE 3-3
PITT - Hutchins 33-yard field goal, 03:30	PITT 6-3
PITT - Tino Sunseri 1-yard run (Hutchins Kick), 00:34	PITT 13-3
3rd quarter
PITT - Brock DeCicco 13-yard pass from Sunseri (Hutchins kick), 10:47	PITT 20-3
UK - Moncell Allen 1-yard run (Mcintosh Kick), 00:41	PITT 20-10
4th quarter
PITT - Dion Lewis 2-yard run (Hutchins kick), 10:26	PITT 27-10

=== Statistics ===
Statistics	Pittsburgh	Kentucky
First downs	20	20
Total offense, plays - yards	65-357	68-315
Rushes-yards (net)	46-261	32-104
Passing yards (net)	96	211
Passes, Comp-Att-Int	9-19-1	21-36-0
Possession	32:38	27:22

== Notes ==
- Dave Wannstedt, who was forced to resign after the regular season, was expected to coach Pitt in the bowl game, however on January 3, 2011, he declined to coach in the game. Instead defensive coordinator Phil Bennett stepped in as interim head coach.
