= 2010 Pittsburgh Panthers football team =

American college football season

2010 Pittsburgh Panthers football

Big East co-champion BBVA Compass Bowl champion

BBVA Compass Bowl, W 27–10 vs. Kentucky
- Conference: Big East Conference
- Record: 8–5 (5–2 Big East)
- Head coach: Dave Wannstedt (6th season; regular season); Phil Bennett (interim, bowl game)
- Offensive coordinator: Frank Cignetti Jr. (2nd season); Brian Angelichio (interim)
- Offensive scheme: Pro-style
- Defensive coordinator: Phil Bennett (3rd season)
- Base defense: 4–3
- Home stadium: Heinz Field

2010 Big East Conference football standings
	Conf.			Overall
Team	W		L	W		L
Connecticut $+	5	–	2	8	–	5
West Virginia +	5	–	2	9	–	4
Pittsburgh +	5	–	2	8	–	5
Syracuse	4	–	3	8	–	5
South Florida	3	–	4	8	–	5
Louisville	3	–	4	7	–	6
Cincinnati	2	–	5	4	–	8
Rutgers	1	–	6	4	–	8
$ – BCS representative as conference champion; + – Conference co-champions; Rankings from AP Poll

The 2010 Pittsburgh Panthers football team represented the University of Pittsburgh in the 2010 NCAA Division I FBS football season. The Panthers were members of the Big East Conference. They were led by the sixth-year head coach Dave Wannstedt and played their home games at Heinz Field. 2010 marked the university's 121st season overall. They finished the season 8–5, 5–2 in Big East play to be champions of the Big East with Connecticut and West Virginia. However, due to losses to both schools, Pitt did not earn the conference's bid to a Bowl Championship Series (BCS) game. They were invited to the BBVA Compass Bowl where they defeated Kentucky, 27–10. Wannstedt was forced to resign on December 7, 2010.

== Schedule ==
The Panthers schedule was released February 10, 2010.

Date	Time	Opponent	Rank	Site	TV	Result	Attendance
September 2	8:30 p.m.	at No. 24 Utah*	No. 15	Rice-Eccles Stadium; Salt Lake City, UT	Versus	L 24–27 ^{OT}	45,730
September 11	1:00 p.m.	No. 6 (FCS) New Hampshire*		Heinz Field; Pittsburgh, PA	ESPN3	W 38–16	50,120
September 23	7:30 p.m.	No. 19 Miami (FL)*		Heinz Field; Pittsburgh, PA	ESPN	L 3–31	58,115
October 2	3:30 p.m.	FIU*		Heinz Field; Pittsburgh, PA	ESPN3	W 44–17	45,207
October 9	3:30 p.m.	at Notre Dame*		Notre Dame Stadium; Notre Dame, IN (rivalry)	NBC	L 17–23	80,795
October 16	12:00 p.m.	at Syracuse		Carrier Dome; Syracuse, NY (rivalry)	Big East Network	W 45–14	40,168
October 23	12:00 p.m.	Rutgers		Heinz Field; Pittsburgh, PA	Big East Network	W 41–21	50,425
October 30	12:00 p.m.	Louisville^{†}		Heinz Field; Pittsburgh, PA	Big East Network	W 20–3	48,562
November 11	7:30 p.m.	at Connecticut		Rentschler Field; East Hartford, CT	ESPN	L 28–30	35,391
November 20	12:00 p.m.	at South Florida		Raymond James Stadium; Tampa, FL	ESPN2	W 17–10	43,844
November 26	12:00 p.m.	West Virginia		Heinz Field; Pittsburgh, PA (Backyard Brawl)	ABC	L 10–35	60,562
December 4	12:00 p.m.	at Cincinnati		Nippert Stadium; Cincinnati, OH (River City Rivalry)	ESPN	W 28–10	27,496
January 8	12:00 p.m.	vs. Kentucky*		Legion Field; Birmingham, AL (BBVA Compass Bowl)	ESPN	W 27–10	41,207
*Non-conference game; ^{†}Homecoming; Rankings from AP Poll released prior to the game; All times are in Eastern time

== Rankings ==
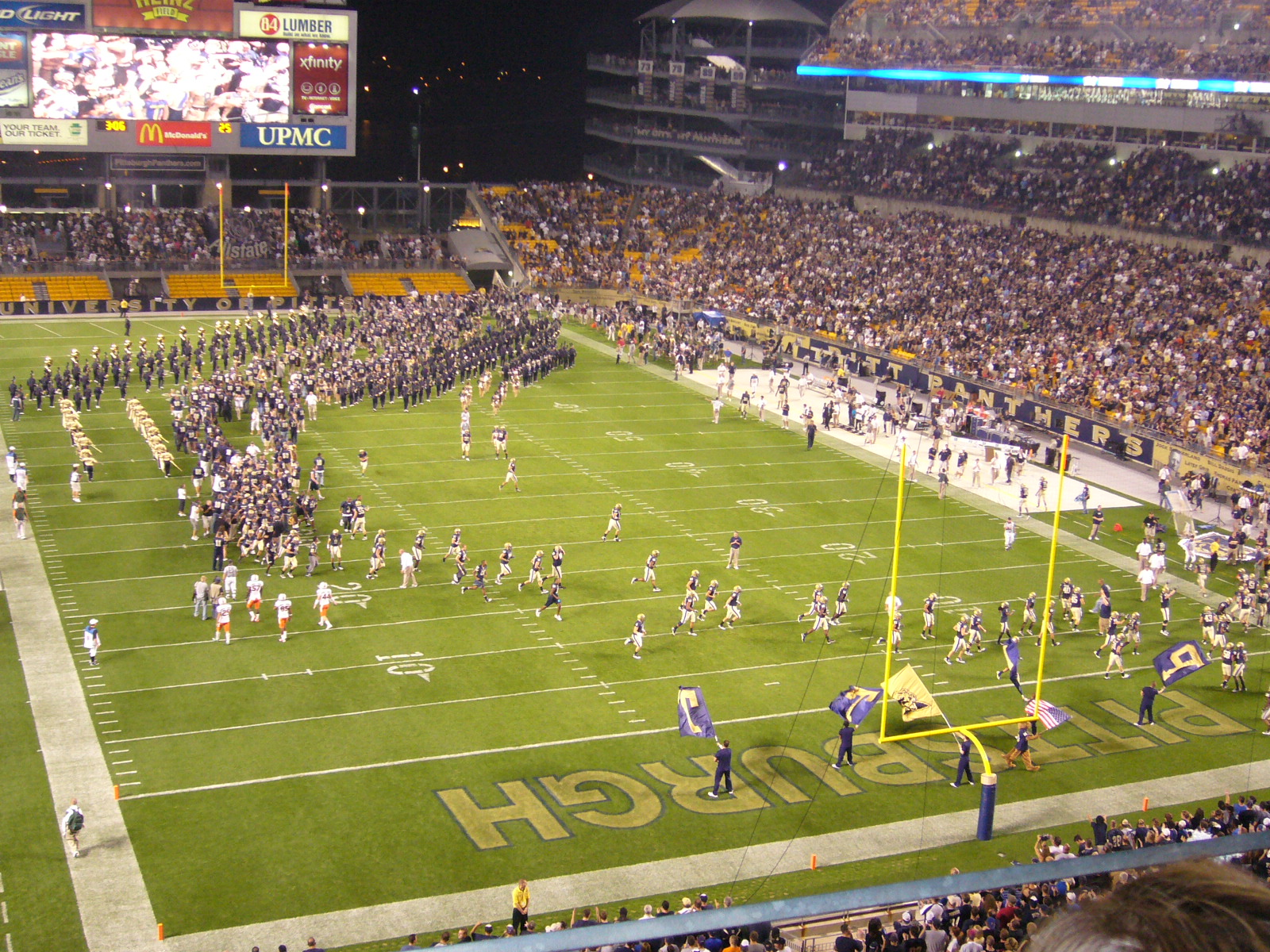
Pregame of the September 23rd game versus Miami

The Panthers debuted at #15 in the preseason Coaches' Poll. and in the preseason Associated Press (AP) Poll.

Sports Illustrated ranked Pitt #16 in the annual College Football Preview issue on August 16, 2010.

Rivals.com listed Pitt at #14 in their preseason picks on August 20, 2010.

CBSSports.com ranked Pitt #13 in the preseason rankings of all 120 FBS teams on August 30, 2010.

Ranking movements Legend: ██ Increase in ranking ██ Decrease in ranking — = Not ranked RV = Received votes
	Week															
Poll	Pre	1	2	3	4	5	6	7	8	9	10	11	12	13	14	Final
AP	15	RV	RV	RV	—	—	—	—	—	RV	RV	—	—	—	RV	—
Coaches	15	RV	RV	RV	—	—	—	—	—	—	RV	—	RV	—	—	—
Harris	Not released						—	—	RV	RV	RV	—	—	—	—	Not released
BCS	Not released							—	—	—	—	—	—	—	—	Not released

== Preseason ==
=== Preseason player honors ===
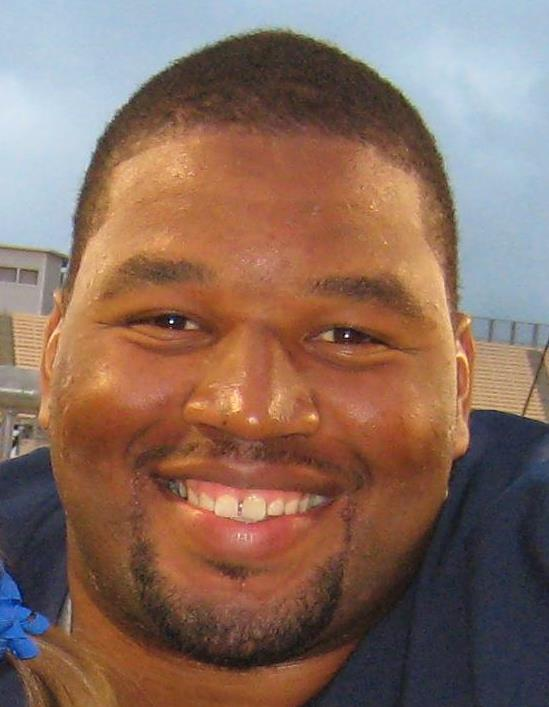
Jason Pinkston was named to both the Lombardi and Outland Trophy watch lists in 2010

Six Panthers have been named to a combined total of 14 preseason award watch lists:

Senior defensive end Greg Romeus has been named to the Lombardi Award (down linemen), Chuck Bednarik Award (defensive player), Ted Hendricks Award (defensive end), Lott Trophy (defensive player of the year) and Bronko Nagurski Trophy (top defensive player) watch lists.

Senior offensive tackle Jason Pinkston was named to the Lombardi Award (down linemen) and Outland Trophy (interior linemen) watch lists.

Senior safety Dom DeCicco has been named to the Jim Thorpe Award (defensive back) watch list.

Senior kicker Dan Hutchins was named to the Lou Groza Award (top placekicker) watch list.

Junior receiver Jon Baldwin was named to the Maxwell Award (outstanding collegiate football player) and Biletnikoff Award (wide receiver) watch lists.

Sophomore running back Dion Lewis has been named to the Maxwell Award (outstanding collegiate football player), Walter Camp Player of the Year Award and Doak Walker Award (top running back) watch lists.

=== Preseason Big East Media Poll ===
On August 3, 2010, representatives of the media serving the eight Big East football markets voted Pitt as the favorite to win the 2010 Big East Football Conference championship. The Panthers received 22 of 24 possible first-place votes, and 2 second-place votes.

== Game summaries ==
=== Utah ===
Team	1	2	3	4	OT	Total
#15 Panthers	0	7	3	14	0	24
• #24 Utah	0	14	3	7	3	27

- Date: September 2, 2010
- Location: Rice–Eccles Stadium, Salt Lake City, Utah
- Game start: 8:33 p.m. EST
- Elapsed time: 3:22
- Game attendance: 45,730
- Game weather: Sunny and clear; 77 °F (25 °C); Wind 7 mph (11 km/h) NNW
- Referee: John McDaid
- TV announcers (Versus): Joe Beninati, Kelly Stouffer, and Lindsay Soto

Scoring summary
Q2	12:00	Pitt	Lewis 3 yd run (Hutchins PAT)	Pitt 7–0
Q2	6:27	Utah	Brooks 19 yd pass from Wynn (Phillips PAT)	Tied 7–7
Q2	5:39	Utah	Brooks 3 yd pass from Wynn (Phillips PAT)	Utah 14–7
Q3	11:52	Utah	Phillips 26 yd FG	Utah 17–7
Q3	3:51	Pitt	Hutchins 37 yd FG	Utah 17–10
Q4	9:48	Pitt	Hutchins 28 yd FG	Utah 17–13
Q4	7:59	Utah	Christopher 61 yd pass from Wynn (Phillips PAT)	Utah 24–13
Q4	7:11	Pitt	Baldwin 44 yd pass from Sunseri (Baldwin 2-pt pass from Sunseri)	Utah 24–21
Q4	0:00	Pitt	Hutchins 30 yd FG	Tied 24–24
OT1		Utah	Phillips 21 yd FG	Utah 27–24

Sophomore Tino Sunseri made his first career start at quarterback. Pitt trailed 24–13 halfway through the fourth quarter. With 7:11 left, Sunseri completed a 44-yard touchdown pass to Jon Baldwin, and a two-point conversion made it 24–21. Dan Hutchins kicked a 30-yard field goal to tie the game and end regulation. In overtime, Utah won the toss and elected to play defense. On the first play of overtime, Sunseri was intercepted by Utah freshman Brian Blechen. A few plays later Joe Phillips made a 21-yard field goal to give the Utes the 27–24 victory.

Sunseri finished 16 of 28 with 184 yards, Dion Lewis carried 25 times for 75 yards and one touchdown, and Baldwin led receivers with four receptions for 71 yards and a touchdown.

=== New Hampshire ===
Team	1	2	3	4	Total
New Hampshire	0	3	7	6	16
• Panthers	10	7	14	7	38

- Date: September 11, 2010
- Location: Heinz Field, Pittsburgh, Pennsylvania
- Game start: 1:00 p.m. EST
- TV announcers (ESPN3): Jim Barber and Je'Rod Cherry

Scoring summary
Q1	13:45	Pitt	Hutchins 32 yd FG	Pitt 3–0
Q1	3:52	Pitt	Lewis 2 yd run (Hutchins PAT)	Pitt 10–0
Q2	11:54	UNH	DeLajo 22 yd FG	Pitt 10–3
Q2	0:18	Pitt	Saddler 2 yd pass from Sunseri (Hutchins PAT)	Pitt 17–3
Q3	10:18	Pitt	Badlwin 56 yd pass from Sunseri (Hutchins PAT)	Pitt 24–3
Q3	7:10	UNH	Peters 2 yd run (DeLajo PAT)	Pitt 24–10
Q3	2:20	Pitt	Graham 8 yrd run (Hutchins PAT)	Pitt 31–10
Q4	10:43	Pitt	Graham 64 yd run (Hutchins PAT)	Pitt 38–10
Q4	1:13	UNH	Cullen 11 yd pass from Decker (DeLajo PAT failed)	Pitt 38–16

Pitt's first home game of the season was against the New Hampshire Wildcats, who at the time of the game were ranked as the #6 team in Division I FCS (I-AA). The Wildcats were able to contain Dion Lewis, who finished the game with 27 yards on 10 carries. However, sophomore Ray Graham had 9 carries for 116 yards and two touchdowns. Tino Sunseri improved in his second career start, completing 24 of 34 passes for 275 yards, 2 touchdowns, and 1 interception. The receiving touchdowns went to Cameron Saddler for 2 yards and Jon Baldwin for 56; Baldwin led receivers with 6 for 100 yards. Defensive end Greg Romeus sat out his second consecutive game due to injury, in hopes of returning against the Miami Hurricanes on September 23. However, Romeus underwent back surgery to relieve a herniated disc and will miss up to 6 weeks. Pitt improved its record against FCS teams to 9–0.

=== Miami ===
	1	2	3	4	Total
#19 Miami	7	3	7	14	31
Panthers	0	0	0	3	3

Miami and Pittsburgh last met in 2003 at Pittsburgh in a game won by Miami 28–14. Pittsburgh is 9–21–1 all time against Miami.

=== Florida International ===
	1	2	3	4	Total
Florida International	0	10	0	7	17
Panthers	0	3	13	28	44

=== Notre Dame ===
	1	2	3	4	Total
Panthers	3	0	7	7	17
Notre Dame	7	10	3	3	23

=== Syracuse ===
	1	2	3	4	Total
Panthers	14	14	7	10	45
Syracuse	7	0	0	7	14

=== Rutgers ===
	1	2	3	4	Total
Rutgers	7	7	0	7	21
Panthers	7	7	10	17	41

=== Louisville ===
	1	2	3	4	Total
Louisville	3	0	0	0	3
Panthers	3	3	7	7	20

=== Connecticut ===
Team	1	2	3	4	Total
Panthers	7	0	14	7	28
• Connecticut	7	3	10	10	30

- Date: November 11
- Location: Rentschler Field
  East Hartford, CT
- Game start: 7:30 p.m. EST
- Elapsed time: 3:08
- Game attendance: 35,391
- Game weather: 42 °F (6 °C), Clear and cold
- Referee: Thomas Tomczyk
- TV announcers (ESPN): Rece Davis, Craig James, Jesse Palmer, and Jenn Brown

The Panthers lost this tight conference contest to the Connecticut Huskies 30–28. After UConn's Zach Frazer threw an interception on the first play of the game, the Panthers responded with a 4-yard touchdown run by Dion Lewis. UConn scored on the ensuing drive on a 36-yard pass from Frazer to Kashif Moore to tie the game at 7. Dave Teggart added 2 field goals to give Connecticut a 13–7 lead in the third quarter.
Later in the third quarter, the Panthers were able to get their offense going when Tino Sunseri completed a 42-yard pass to Jon Baldwin. The Panthers scored on the drive with a one-yard run from Lewis. After a Connecticut punt, Pitt extended its lead to 21–13 on a Ray Graham touchdown run. On the ensuing kickoff, UConn's Nick Williams returned the kick 95 yards for a touchdown to make the score 21–20 in favor of the Panthers at the end of the third quarter.
After trading punts to begin the fourth quarter, Connecticut took a 23–21 lead on a 25-yard field goal from Teggart. Then UConn's Robbie Frey recovered a Graham fumble on the following kick-off for UConn. Two plays later, Frazer threw a 14-yard touchdown pass to Isiah Moore to extend the Connecticut lead to 30–21. The Panthers scored on their next possession when they went 70 yards in only 1 minute and 50 seconds on a 20-yard touchdown catch by Baldwin. UConn got the ball back at their ten-yard line with 4:29 left in the game and a 2-point lead. With 2:50 left in the game, and the ball on their own 19-yard line, Connecticut faced a fourth down with one yard to gain. Instead of punting the ball back to the Panthers, they handed the ball to Todman, who gained 4 yards and the first down. If UConn had failed to get the first down, the Panthers would have been given the ball within range to kick a go-ahead field goal. Todman gained 41 yards on the final drive, and UConn ran the remaining time off the clock to give the Panthers their first conference loss of the season.

=== South Florida ===
	1	2	3	4	Total
Panthers	3	0	7	7	17
South Florida	0	3	7	0	10

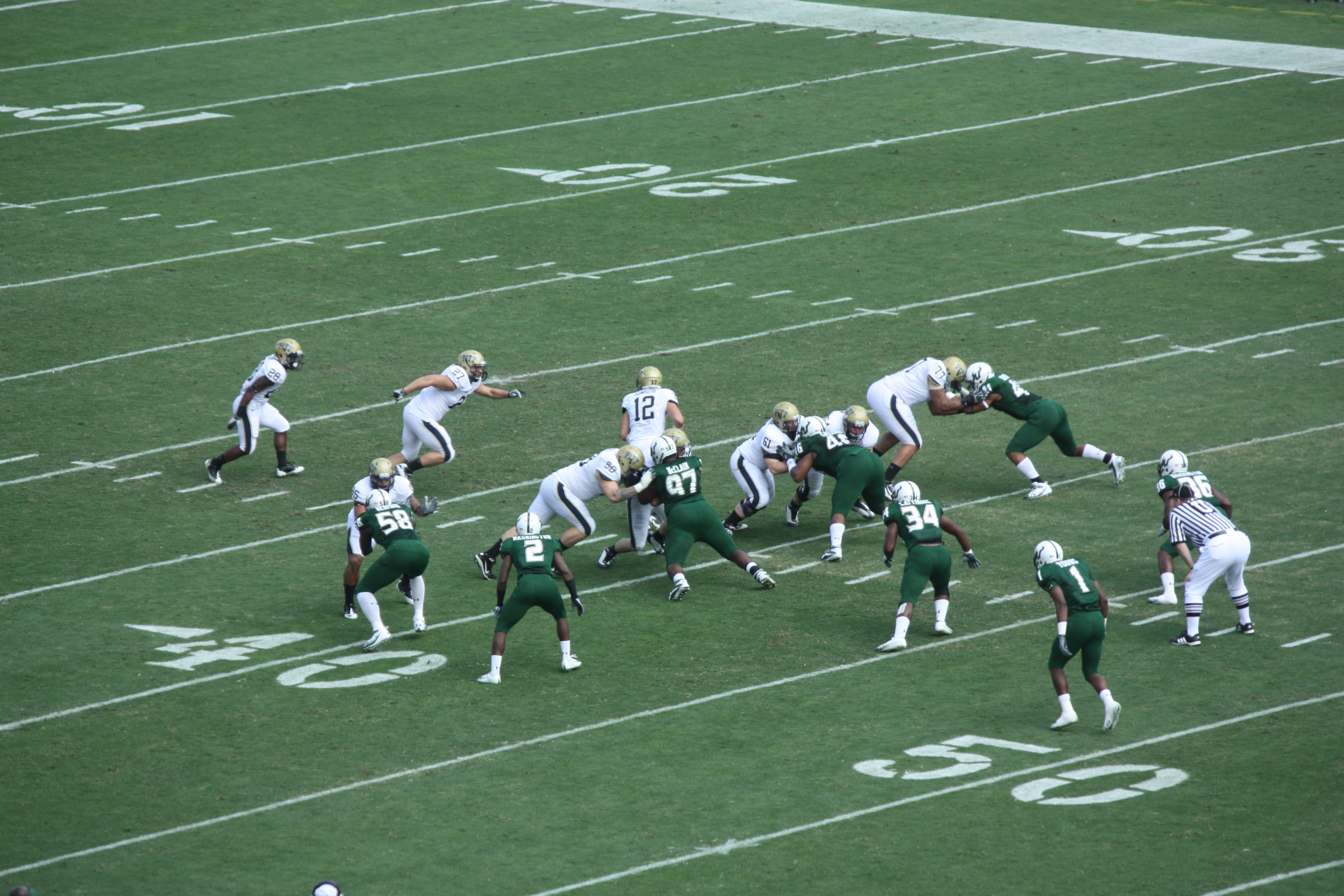
Pittsburgh vs. South Florida

=== West Virginia ===
Backyard Brawl

Team	1	2	3	4	Total
• West Virginia	7	7	14	7	35
Panthers	7	0	3	0	10

- Date: November 26, 2010
- Location: Heinz Field, Pittsburgh, Pennsylvania
- Game start: 12:00
- TV announcers (ABC): Beth Mowins, Ray Bentley, Quint Kessenich

In the 103rd edition of the Backyard Brawl, West Virginia defeated the Panthers 35–10 at Heinz Field. The Panthers controlled their own destiny coming into the game, and likely needed to win their last two games to claim the Big East title and BCS bowl berth outright, but West Virginia would defeat Pitt for the second year in a row, giving Pitt a shot at at least a share of the Big East title with a win in their final game of the season against Cincinnati.

=== Cincinnati ===
River City Rivalry

Team	1	2	3	4	Total
• Panthers	7	14	0	7	28
Cincinnati	0	10	0	0	10

- Date: December 4, 2010
- Location: Nippert Stadium, Cincinnati, Ohio
- Game start: 12:00
- TV announcers (ABC): Dave Pasch, Bob Griese, Chris Spielman

Scoring summary
Q1	3:07	Pitt	Lewis 2 yd run (Hutchins PAT)	Pitt 7–0
Q2	14:48	Pitt	Lewis 76 yd run (Hutchins PAT)	Pitt 14–0
Q2	11:41	Cincy	McClung 3 yd pass from Collaros (Rogers PAT)	Pitt 14–7
Q2	5:18	Pitt	Lewis 7 yd run (Hutchins PAT)	Pitt 21–7
Q2	0:29	Cincy	Rogers 33 yd FG	Pitt 21–10
Q4	3:15	Pitt	Lewis 21 yd run	Pitt 28–10

In the 10th edition of the River City Rivalry, the Panthers defeated the Cincinnati Bearcats 28–10 at Nippert Stadium. The Panthers were led by sophomore running back Dion Lewis who rushed for a career-high 261 yards against Cincinnati, 6th most in a single game in Pitt history, and 4 touchdowns. With their win over Cincinnati, Pitt won a share of the Big East title along with West Virginia and Connecticut. This title would be Pitt's second and last shared title in the Big East (they never won a Big East Title outright). The Panthers would go on to play in the BBVA Compass Bowl with UConn representing the Big East in its BCS bowl due to UConn's wins over the two other Big East co-champions Pitt and West Virginia. This was also the last game for coach Dave Wannstedt who resigned December 7, 2010.

=== BBVA Compass Bowl ===
2011 BBVA Compass Bowl

Team	1	2	3	4	Total
• Panthers	0	13	7	7	27
Kentucky	3	0	7	0	10

- Location: Birmingham, Alabama
- Game start: 12:00 p.m.
- Game attendance: 41,207
- TV announcers (ESPN/ESPN Radio): Mike Gleason, John Congemi, Cara Capuano/Clay Matvick, Herm Edwards, Elizabeth Moreau

== Coaching staff ==
2010 Pittsburgh Panthers football staff
Coaching staff: Dave Wannstedt – Head coach; Greg Gattuso – Assistant head coach/defensive line; Phil Bennett – Defensive coordinator; Frank Cignetti, Jr. – Offensive coordinator/quarterbacks; Brian Angelichio – Tight ends; Bernard Clark, Jr. – Linebackers; Jeff Hafley – Secondary; Scott Turner – Wide receivers; David Walker – Running backs; Tony Wise – Offensive line	Support staff: Chris LaSala – Assistant Athletic Director/football operations; Bob Junko – Director of Football Relations and Program Enhancement; Matt Dudek - Recruiting Coordinator; Eric Thatcher – Defensive assistant; Luke Getsy – Offensive assistant	Strength and conditioning staff: Buddy Morris – Strength and conditioning coach; James Smith – Assistant strength and conditioning coach

== After the season ==
On December 7, 2010, Wannstedt resigned as head coach, reportedly under pressure following a disappointing 7–5 regular season and having failed to advance to a BCS bowl during his tenure. Wannstedt accepted a position as special assistant to the athletic director at the university.

Following this, Michael Haywood, the former coach of the Miami University Redhawks, was hired as Pitt's new head coach on December 16, 2010. Haywood was arrested on December 31, 2010, on a charge of domestic battery, which was later upgraded to a felony. Pitt chancellor Mark Nordenberg announced Haywood's firing the next day, on January 1, 2011.

Wannstedt announced on January 3 that he would not coach the bowl game and defensive coordinator Phil Bennett would take over the team on an interim basis for the BBVA Compass Bowl against Kentucky, which Pitt won 27–10.

Controversy also arose when an investigation by Sports Illustrated revealed that the university's 2010 football team had 22 players with criminal records, the most by any team ranked in the magazine's pre-season top 25 rankings. Athletic Director Steve Pederson called the number of incidents "totally unacceptable", stating that the athletic department was "addressing the situation" including having already instituted more intense "background research". Ousted coach Dave Wannstedt defended his past "body of work" but acknowledged "an unfortunate stretch of incidents" the previous summer stating that "every player and each incident was evaluated on an individual basis" and that "we did our due diligence to make sure that we treated each player fair". The Sports Illustrated report received criticism for its lack of context, methodology, and sensationalism.

== Team players drafted into the NFL ==
Player	Position	Round	Pick	NFL club
Jon Baldwin	Wide receiver	1	26	Kansas City Chiefs
Jabaal Sheard	Defensive line	2	37	Cleveland Browns
Dion Lewis	Running back	5	149	Philadelphia Eagles
Jason Pinkston	Offensive line	5	150	Cleveland Browns
Greg Romeus	Defensive line	7	226	New Orleans Saints

Notable undrafted players: Henry Hynoski signed with the Giants shortly after the 2011 NFL lockout ended. Started all 16 games and in the playoffs during his rookie season, in which the Giants won the Super Bowl.
