= 2010 Kentucky Wildcats football team =

American college football season

2010 Kentucky Wildcats football

BBVA Compass Bowl, L 10–27 vs. Pittsburgh
- Conference: Southeastern Conference
- Eastern Division
- Record: 6–7 (2–6 SEC)
- Head coach: Joker Phillips (1st season)
- Offensive coordinator: Randy Sanders (1st season)
- Offensive scheme: Pro-style
- Defensive coordinator: Steve Brown (5th season)
- Base defense: 4–3
- Captains: Randall Cobb; DeQuin Evans
- Home stadium: Commonwealth Stadium

2010 Southeastern Conference football standings
	Conf.			Overall
Team	W		L	W		L
Eastern Division
No. 22 South Carolina x	5	–	3	9	–	5
Florida	4	–	4	8	–	5
Georgia	3	–	5	6	–	7
Tennessee	3	–	5	6	–	7
Kentucky	2	–	6	6	–	7
Vanderbilt	1	–	7	2	–	10
Western Division
No. 1 Auburn x$#	8	–	0	14	–	0
No. 12 Arkansas %	6	–	2	10	–	3
No. 8 LSU	6	–	2	11	–	2
No. 10 Alabama	5	–	3	10	–	3
No. 15 Mississippi State	4	–	4	9	–	4
Ole Miss*	1	–	7	4	–	8
Championship: Auburn 56, South Carolina 17
# – BCS National Champion; $ – BCS representative as conference champion; % – BCS at-large representative; x – Division champion/co-champions; * Ole Miss vacated all wins due to NCAA violations.; Rankings from AP Poll

The 2010 Kentucky Wildcats football team represented the University of Kentucky during the 2010 NCAA Division I FBS football season. The Wildcats, led by first-year head coach Joker Phillips, competed in the Eastern Division of the Southeastern Conference and played their home games at Commonwealth Stadium. They finished the season 6–7, 2–6 in SEC play and were invited to the BBVA Compass Bowl where they were defeated by Pittsburgh 10–27.

== Schedule ==
Date	Time	Opponent	Site	TV	Result	Attendance
September 4	3:30 pm	at Louisville*	Papa John's Cardinal Stadium; Louisville, KY (Governor's Cup)	ABC	W 23–16	55,327
September 11	7:30 pm	Western Kentucky*	Commonwealth Stadium; Lexington, KY	CSS	W 63–28	66,584
September 18	7:00 pm	Akron*	Commonwealth Stadium; Lexington, KY	SECRN	W 47–10	64,014
September 25	7:00 pm	at No. 9 Florida	Ben Hill Griffin Stadium; Gainesville, FL (rivalry)	ESPNU	L 14–48	90,547
October 2	12:21 pm	at Ole Miss	Vaught–Hemingway Stadium; Oxford, MS	SECN	L 35–42	55,344
October 9	7:30 pm	No. 8 Auburn	Commonwealth Stadium; Lexington, KY	ESPN2	L 34–37	70,776
October 16	6:00 pm	No. 10 South Carolina	Commonwealth Stadium; Lexington, KY	ESPN2	W 31–28	67,955
October 23	7:30 pm	Georgia	Commonwealth Stadium; Lexington, KY	CSS	L 31–44	70,884
October 30	7:00 pm	at No. 23 Mississippi State	Davis Wade Stadium; Starkville, MS	ESPNU	L 17–24	54,168
November 6	12:30 pm	Charleston Southern*	Commonwealth Stadium; Lexington, KY	BBSN	W 49–21	61,884
November 13	12:21 pm	Vanderbilt	Commonwealth Stadium; Lexington, KY (rivalry)	SECN	W 38–20	60,391
November 27	12:21 pm	at Tennessee	Neyland Stadium; Knoxville, TN (Battle for the Barrel)	SECN	L 14–24	101,170
January 8	12:00 pm	vs. Pittsburgh*	Legion Field; Birmingham, AL (BBVA Compass Bowl)	ESPN	L 10–27	41,207
*Non-conference game; Rankings from AP Poll released prior to the game; All times are in Eastern time

== Game summaries ==
=== Louisville ===
2010 Governor's Cup

Team	1	2	3	4	Total
Kentucky	7	7	3	0	17
• Louisville	3	10	7	3	23

- Location: Louisville, Kentucky
- Game start: 3:30 p.m.
- Elapsed time: 3:00
- Game attendance: 55,320
- Game weather: 77 degrees, Sunny
- Referee: Matt Moore
- TV announcers (ABC): Dave Lamont (play-by-play), JC Pearson (color)

=== Western Kentucky ===
Team	1	2	3	4	Total
Western Kentucky	7	7	7	3	24
• Kentucky	7	24	0	14	45

- Location: Lexington, Kentucky
- Game start: 7:30 p.m.
- Elapsed time: 3:15
- Game attendance: 66,584
- Game weather: 76 degrees, Partly Cloudy
- Referee: Penn Wagers
- Television network: CSS

=== Akron ===
Team	1	2	3	4	Total
Akron	0	3	0	7	10
• Kentucky	3	17	14	7	41

- Location: Lexington, Kentucky
- Game start: 7:08 p.m.
- Elapsed time: 3:04
- Game attendance: 64,000
- Game weather: 84 degrees, partly cloudy
- Referee: Matt Monroe
- Television network: FSN

=== Florida ===
Team	1	2	3	4	Total
Kentucky	3	7	7	0	17
• #9 Florida	3	7	14	7	31

- Location: Gainesville, Florida
- Game start: 7:00 p.m.
- Game attendance: 90,545
- Game weather: 82 degrees and partly cloudy
- Referee: Steve Shaw
- TV announcers (ESPNU): Clay Matvick (play-by-play) and Mark Schlereth (color)

=== Ole Miss ===
Team	1	2	3	4	Total
• Kentucky	7	10	3	22	42
Ole Miss	7	7	14	7	35

- Location: Oxford, Mississippi
- Game start: 11:21 a.m.
- Elapsed time: 3:54
- Game attendance: 55,330
- Game weather: 64, Calm
- Referee: Hubert Owens
- TV announcers (SEC Network): Dave Neal (play-by-play), Andre Ware (color), Cara Capuano (sideline)

=== Auburn ===
Team	1	2	3	4	Total
• #7 Auburn	14	0	10	9	33
Kentucky	7	7	7	7	28

- Location: Lexington, Kentucky
- Game start: 7:37 p.m.
- Elapsed time: 3:12
- Game attendance: 70,777
- Game weather: 79, Fair
- Referee: Marc Curles
- TV announcers (ESPN2): Mark Jones (play-by-play), Bob Davie (color), Quint Kessenich (sideline)

=== South Carolina ===
Team	1	2	3	4	Total
#10 South Carolina	14	14	0	0	28
• Kentucky	7	17	6	14	44

- Location: Lexington, Kentucky
- Game start: 6:00 p.m.
- Elapsed time: 6:15
- Game attendance: 67,954
- Game weather: 68, Sunny
- Referee: Hubert Owens
- TV announcers (ESPN2): Mark Jones (play-by-play), Bob Davie (color)

=== Georgia ===
Team	1	2	3	4	Total
• Georgia	7	14	7	6	34
Kentucky	3	7	7	0	17

- Location: Lexington, Kentucky
- Game start: 7:35 p.m.
- Elapsed time: 3:05
- Game attendance: 70,862
- Game weather: 71, Fair
- Referee: Marc Curles
- Television network: CSS

=== Mississippi State ===
Team	1	2	3	4	Total
Kentucky	7	3	14	0	24
• #22 Mississippi State	17	7	7	7	38

- Location: Starkville, Mississippi
- Game start: 7:00 p.m.
- Elapsed time: 3:36
- Game attendance: 54,168
- Game weather: Partly Cloudy
- TV announcers (ESPNU): Clay Mavtick (play-by-play), Herman Edwards (color)

=== Charleston Southern ===
Team	1	2	3	4	Total
Charleston Southern	7	7	7	0	21
• Kentucky	14	14	7	14	49

- Location: Lexington, Kentucky
- Game start: 12:38
- Elapsed time: 2:59
- Game attendance: 61,884
- Game weather: Partly Cloudy
- Referee: Jeff Hilyer
- TV announcers (Big Blue Sports Network): Rob Bromley

=== Vanderbilt ===
Team	1	2	3	4	Total
Vanderbilt	3	10	0	7	20
• Kentucky	3	7	14	14	38

- Location: Lexington, Kentucky
- Game start: 12:21
- Elapsed time: 3:09
- Game weather: 72, Partly Cloudy
- Referee: Steve Shaw
- TV announcers (SEC Network): Dave Neal (play-by-play), Andre Ware (color), Cara Capuano (sideline)

=== Tennessee ===
Team	1	2	3	4	Total
• Kentucky	7	10	10	7	34
Tennessee	3	13	10	3	29

- Location: Knoxville, Tennessee
- Game start: 12:21 p.m.
- Game attendance: 97,170
- TV announcers (SEC Network): Dave Neal (play-by-play), Andre Ware (color), Cara Capuano (sideline)

=== BBVA Compass Bowl ===
Team	1	2	3	4	Total
Syracuse	0	14	7	7	28
• Kentucky	3	14	14	7	38

- Location: Birmingham, Alabama
- Game start: 12:00 p.m.
- Game attendance: 41,207
- TV announcers (ESPN): Mike Gleason and John Congemi

== Statistics ==
=== Team ===
	UK	Opp
Scoring	382	318
Points per game	34.7	28.9
First downs	243	193
Rushing	91	103
Passing	134	78
Penalty	18	12
Total offense	4857	3817
Avg per play	6.4	5.5
Avg per game	441.5	347.0
Fumbles-Lost	13-8	15-7
Penalties-Yards	61-503	68-558
Avg per game	45.7	50.7

	UK	Opp
Punts-Yards	41-1823	63-2502
Avg Net Punt	36.9	36.0
Time of possession/Game	30:14	29:46
3rd down conversions	67/150	55/141
4th down conversions	14/23	5/6
Touchdowns scored	50	41
Field goals-Attempts	11/15	11/12
PAT-Attempts	48/50	40/41
Attendance	462,488	255,386
Games/Avg per Game	7/66,070	4/63,846
Neutral Site Games	0	0

==== Scores by quarter ====
	1	2	3	4	Total
Kentucky	71	120	96	95	382
Opponents	90	106	54	68	318

=== Offense ===
==== Rushing ====
Name	GP-GS	Att	Gain	Loss	Net	Avg	TD	Long	Avg/G
Derrick Locke	7-7	130	748	29	719	5.5	9	83	102.7
Randall Cobb	11-0	47	398	22	376	8.0	5	73	34.2
Donald Russell	11-3	64	308	15	293	4.6	0	25	26.6
Raymond Sanders	10-1	62	277	31	246	4.0	3	28	24.6
CoShik Williams	9-0	24	140	4	136	5.7	4	41	15.1
Moncell Allen	11-0	11	39	0	39	3.5	0	7	3.5
Morgan Newton	4-0	4	38	6	32	8.0	0	18	8.0
Jonathan George	9-0	9	31	6	25	2.8	0	8	2.8
Tyler Sargent	3-0	1	2	0	2	2.0	0	2	0.7
Greg Meisner	3-0	1	0	1	-1	-1.0	0	2	-0.3
Mike Hartline	11-0	28	67	93	-26	-0.9	1	13	-2.4
TEAM	5-0	3	0	2	-2	-0.7	0	0	-0.4
Total	11	384	2048	209	1839	4.8	24	83	167.2
Opponents	11	429	2245	280	1965	4.6	27	80	178.6

==== Passing ====
Name	GP-GS	Effic	Att-Cmp	Pct	Yds	TD-INT	Lng	Avg/G
Mike Hartline	11-11	148.9	237-361	65.7%	2906	22-8	55	264.2
Randall Cobb	11-0	247.1	5-8	62.5%	58	3-0	19	5.3
Morgan Newton	4-0	121.9	4-7	57.1%	54	0-0	40	13.5
Total	11	150.5	246-376	65.4%	3018	25-8	55	274.4
Opponents	11	123.2	143-262	54.6%	1852	11-6	52	168.4

==== Receiving ====
Name	GP-GS	Receptions	Yds	Avg	TD	Long	Avg/G
Randall Cobb	11-11	66	839	12.7	7	48	76.3
Chris Matthews	11-11	51	812	15.9	9	55	73.8
La'Rod King	11-5	32	427	13.3	5	47	38.8
Derrick Locke	7-0	26	251	9.7	0	32	35.9
Donald Russell	11-0	14	134	9.6	0	37	12.2
Jordan Aumiller	11-7	18	193	10.7	1	35	17.5
Matt Roark	10-0	12	170	14.2	0	40	17.0
Raymond Sanders	10-0	11	88	8.0	1	27	8.8
Tyler Robinson	9-0	7	55	7.9	0	14	6.1
Brian Adams	10-0	3	23	7.7	0	13	2.3
Moncell Allen	11-0	3	16	5.3	2	15	1.5
CoShik Williams	9	2	0	0	0.0	3	0.0
Nick Melillo	6-0	1	10	10.0	0	10	1.7
Total	11	246	3018	12.3	25	55	274.4
Opponents	11	143	1852	13.0	11	52	168.4

=== Defense ===
Name	GP-GS	Tackles				Sacks	Pass defense		Interceptions				Fumbles		Blkd Kick
Name	GP-GS	Solo	Ast	Total	TFL-Yds	No-Yds	BrUp	QBH	No.-Yds	Avg	TD	Long	No.-Yds	FF	Blkd Kick
Danny Trevathan	11-10	68	52	94.0	15.0-55	2.0-16	2	1	0	0	0	0	0	4	0
Winston Guy	11-11	43	48	67.0	3.0-4	0-0	0	0	2-(-2)	0	0	0	0	0	0
Mychal Bailey	11-11	39	13	45.5	1.0-3	0-0	2	0	1-0	0	0	0	0	0	0
Martavious Neloms	9-8	33	15	40.5	5.5-36	2.0-20	2	1	0	0	0	0	0	1	0
Ronnie Sneed	11-10	26	24	38.0	2.5-6	0-0	1	3	0	0	0	0	0	0	0
Randall Burden	11-11	18	12	24.0	3.5-7	0-0	4	0	0	0	0	0	0	0	0
Anthony Mosley	11-1	13	16	21.0	0.5-1	0-0	5	0	1-0	0	0	0	1-0	0	0
Taylor Wyndham	11-7	15	11	20.5	6.0-25	2.5-22	1	2	0	0	0	0	0	1	0
Mark Crawford	10-6	15	8	19.0	4.0-21	2.0-14	0	0	0	0	0	0	0	0	0
Collins Ukwu	11-11	13	10	18.0	1.5-8	1.0-8	3	2	0	0	0	0	0	1	0
Ridge Wilson	11-0	14	7	17.5	3.0-9	1.5-7	0	0	1-0	0	0	0	1-0	0	0
Ricky Lumpkin	11-11	11	8	15.0	5.5-17	1.0-8	0	3	0	0	0	0	0	0	0
Luke McDermott	11-6	11	6	14.0	5.0-17	3.0-15	0	0	1-6	6.0	0	0	0	0	0
Qua Huzzie	8-1	7	9	11.5	1.0-2	0-0	0	0	0	0	0	0	0	0	0
Dakotah Tyler	9-0	8	3	9.5	0-0	0-0	1	0	0	0	0	0	0	0	0
Jacob Dufrene	11-4	6	6	9.0	0.5-1	0-0	0	0	0	0	0	0	0	0	0
DeQuin Evans	10-4	6	5	8.5	4.0-14	1.5-10	1	0	0	0	0	0	0	0	0
Josh Gibbs	11-0	6	3	7.5	0-0	0-0	0	0	0	0	0	0	0	0	0
Cartier Rice	7-0	5	4	7.0	0.5-1	0-0	1	0	0	0	0	0	0	0	0
Donte Rumph	10-0	5	3	6.5	0-0	0-0	0	0	0	0	0	0	1-0	0	0
EJ Fields	9-0	5	2	6.0	0-0	0-0	0	0	0	0	0	0	0	0	0
Shane McCord	11-0	2	6	5.0	0.5-2	0-0	0	1	0	0	0	0	0	0	0
Avery Williamson	10-0	3	4	5.0	0-0	0-0	1	0	0	0	0	0	0	0	0
Jerrell Priester	8-0	4	0	4.0	2.0-8	0-0	0	0	0	0	0	0	0	0	0
Taiedo Smith	3-0	3	2	4.0	0-0	0-0	0	0	0	0	0	0	0	0	0
Raymond Sanders	10-0	4	0	4.0	0-0	0-0	0	0	0	0	0	0	0	0	0
Antwane Glenn	11-0	3	1	3.5	0-0	0-0	0	0	0	0	0	0	0	0	0
Gabe Correll	9-0	2	3	3.5	0-0	0-0	0	0	0	0	0	0	0	0	0
Nermin Delic	6-0	2	3	3.5	1.5-13	1.5-13	0	0	0	0	0	0	0	1	0
J.J. Helton	11-0	2	2	3.0	0-0	0-0	0	0	0	0	0	0	0	0	0
Matt Roark	10-0	2	2	3.0	0-0	0-0	0	0	0	0	0	0	0	0	1
Jewell Ratliff	10-0	2	0	2.0	0-0	0-0	0	0	0	0	0	0	0	0	0
CoShik Williams	9-0	1	1	1.5	0-0	0-0	1	0	0	0	0	0	0	0	0
Craig McIntosh	10-0	1	1	1.5	0-0	0-0	1	0	0	0	0	0	0	0	0
Pat Simmons	2-0	1	0	1.0	0-0	0-0	0	0	0	0	0	0	0	0	0
Greg Meisner	3-0	1	0	1.0	0-0	0-0	0	0	0	0	0	0	0	0	0
Jacob Lewellen	2-0	1	0	1.0	1.0-1	0-0	0	0	0	0	0	0	0	0	0
Derrick Locke	7-0	1	0	1.0	0-0	0-0	0	0	0	0	0	0	0	0	0
Ryan Tydlacka	11-0	1	0	1.0	0-0	0-0	0	0	0	0	0	0	0	0	0
Joe Mansour	9-0	1	0	1.0	0-0	0-0	0	0	0	0	0	0	0	0	0
Moncell Allen	11-0	1	0	1.0	0-0	0-0	0	0	0	0	0	0	0	0	0
Donald Russell	11-0	0	1	0.5	0-0	0-0	1	0	0	0	0	0	0	0	0
Tyler Robinson	9-0	0	1	0.5	0-0	0-0	1	0	0	0	0	0	0	0	0
Brian Adams	10-0	0	1	0.5	0-0	0-0	1	0	0	0	0	0	0	0	0
Patrick Ligon	3-0	0	0	0.0	0-0	0-0	0	0	0	0	0	0	0	0	0
Tristian Johnson	7-0	0	0.0	0	0-0	0-0	0	0	0	0	0	0	0	0	0
Total	11	408	293	554.5	67-253	18-133	25	13	6-4.0	2.0	0	3	4-0	9	1
Opponents	11	461	332	627.0	69-214.0	13-91	28	22	8-115.0	14.4	0	0	6-0	9	1

=== Special teams ===
Name	Punting								Field goals				Kickoffs				
Name	No.	Yds	Avg	Long	TB	FC	I20	Blkd	Att.-Made	Pct.	Long	Blkd	No.	Yds	Avg	TB	OB
Ryan Tydlacka	41	1823	44.5	73	6	11	12	0	1-3	33.3%	41	0	0	0	0	0	0
Joe Mansour	0	0	0	0	0	0	0	0	0	0	0	0	48	3190	66.5	15	3
Craig McIntosh	0	0	0	0	0	0	0	0	10-12	83.3%	50	0	18	1159	64.4	3	2
Pat Simmons	0	0	0	0	0	0	0	0	0	0	0	0	1	63	63.0	0	0
Total	41	1823	44.5	73	6	11	12	0	11-15	73.3%	50	0	67	4412	65.9	18	5
Opponents	63	2502	39.7	63	2	12	13	0	11-12	91.6%	44	0	62	3754	60.5	9	4

Name	Punt returns					Kick returns				
Name	No.	Yds	Avg	TD	Long	No.	Yds	Avg	TD	Long
Randall Cobb	25	197	7.9	1	50.0	27	635	23.5	0	36.0
Derrick Locke	1	8	8.0	0	8.0	9	241	26.8	0	40.0
Raymond Sanders	1	12	12.0	0	12	4	86	21.5	0	25.0
Qua Huzzie	0	0	0	0	0	1	23	23.0	0	23.0
Jerrell Priester	0	0	0	0	0	2	55	27.5	0	33.0
Raymond Sanders	1	12	12.0	0	12	3	71	23.7	0	25.0
Moncell Allen	0	0	0	0	0	1	17	17.0	0	17.0
Ridge Wilson	0	0	0	0	0	2	14	7.0	0	8.0
Jewell Ratliff	0	0	0	0	0	1	10	10.0	0	10.0
Jonathan George	0	0	0	0	0	1	7	7.0	0	7.0
Total	28	197	7.0	1	50.0	48	1088	22.7	0	40.0
Opponents	17	190	11.2	0	73.0	45	1042	23.2	2	100.0

=== Starters per game ===
Offense

	QB	RB	FB/TE/WR	WR	WR	TE/WR	OT	OG	C	OG	OT
Louisville	Hartline	Locke	King	Cobb	Matthews	Aumiller	C. Burden	Hines	M. Smith	Warford	Murphy
Western Kentucky	Hartline	Locke	Robinson	Cobb	Matthews	Aumiller	C. Burden	Hines	M. Smith	Warford	Durham
Akron	Hartline	Locke	Allen	Cobb	Matthews	Aumiller	C. Burden	Hines	M. Smith	Warford	Durham
Florida	Hartline	Locke	Robinson	Cobb	Matthews	Aumiller	C. Burden	Murphy	M. Smith	Warford	Durham
Ole Miss	Hartline	Locke	Roark	Cobb	Matthews	Aumiller	C. Burden	Murphy	M. Smith	Warford	Durham
Auburn	Hartline	Locke	King	Cobb	Matthews	Aumiller	C. Burden	Hines	M. Smith	Warford	Durham
South Carolina	Hartline	Russell	Allen	Cobb	Matthews	King	C. Burden	Hines	M. Smith	Warford	Durham
Georgia	Hartline	Russell	Allen	Cobb	Matthews	King	C. Burden	Hines	M. Smith	Warford	Durham
Mississippi State	Hartline	Russell	Cobb	Matthews	King	Aumiller	C. Burden	Hines	M. Smith	Warford	Durham
Charleston Southern	Hartline	Russell	Cobb	Matthews	King	Aumiller	C. Burden	Hines	M. Smith	Warford	Durham
Vanderbilt	Hartline	Locke	Allen	Cobb	Matthews	King	C. Burden	Hines	M. Smith	Warford	Durham
Tennessee	Hartline	Locke	Allen	Cobb	Matthews	King	Murphy	Hines	M. Smith	Warford	Durham
Pittsburgh	Newton	Locke	Allen	Cobb	Matthews	King	Murphy	Hines	M. Smith	Warford	Durham

Defense

	DE	DT	DT	DE	LB	LB	LB/DB	DB	DB	S	S
Louisville	Wyndham	McDermott	Lumpkin	Ukwu	Trevathan	Sneed	Mosley	R. Burden	Neloms	T. Smith	Bailey
Western Kentucky	Evans	McDermott	Lumpkin	Ukwu	Trevathan	Sneed	Dufrene	R. Burden	Mosley	Guy	Bailey
Akron	Evans	McDermott	Lumpkin	Ukwu	Trevathan	Sneed	Dufrene	R. Burden	Neloms	Guy	Bailey
Florida	Evans	McDermott	Lumpkin	Ukwu	Huzzie	Sneed	Mosley	R. Burden	Neloms	Guy	Bailey
Ole Miss	Evans	McDermott	Lumpkin	Ukwu	Trevathan	Huzzie	Mosley	R. Burden	Neloms	Guy	Bailey
Auburn	Wyndham	Crawford	Lumpkin	Ukwu	Trevathan	Sneed	Mosley	R. Burden	Neloms	Guy	Bailey
South Carolina	Wyndham	Crawford	Lumpkin	Ukwu	Trevathan	Sneed	Mosley	R. Burden	Neloms	Guy	Bailey
Georgia	Wyndham	Crawford	Lumpkin	Ukwu	Trevathan	Sneed	Dufrene	R. Burden	Neloms	Guy	Bailey
Mississippi State	Wyndham	Crawford	Lumpkin	Ukwu	Trevathan	Sneed	Dufrene	R. Burden	Neloms	Guy	Bailey
Charleston Southern	Wyndham	Crawford	Lumpkin	Ukwu	Trevathan	Sneed	Wilson	R. Burden	Neloms	Guy	Bailey
Vanderbilt	Wyndham	Crawford	Lumpkin	Ukwu	Trevathan	Sneed	Wilson	R. Burden	Neloms	Guy	Bailey
Tennessee	Wyndham	McDermott	Lumpkin	Ukwu	Trevathan	Sneed	Wilson	R. Burden	Neloms	Guy	Bailey
Pittsburgh	Evans	McCord	Lumpkin	Ukwu	Trevathan	Sneed	Wilson	R. Burden	Mosley	Guy	Bailey

== Personnel ==
=== Coaching staff ===
Name	Position	Seasons at Kentucky	Alma mater
Joker Phillips	Head coach	1	Kentucky (1986)
Larry Brinson	Running backs	4	Florida (1983)
Steve Brown	Defensive coordinator	8	Oregon (1983)
Tee Martin	Wide receivers	1	Tennessee/United States Sports Academy (2004)
Greg Nord	Special teams, tight ends	1	Kentucky (1979)
Randy Sanders	Offensive coordinator, quarterbacks	5	Tennessee (1987)
Chuck Smith	Linebackers, recruiting coordinator	6	Kentucky (1981)
Mike Summers	Offensive line	3	Georgetown (KY) (1978)
Chris Thurmond	Secondary	3	Tulsa (1975)
David Turner	Assistant head coach, defensive line	2	Davidson (1985)

=== Roster ===
2010 Kentucky Wildcats football team roster
Players
Coaches
Offense

Pos.	#	Name	Class
QB	5	Mike Hartline	Sr
QB	7	Ryan Mossakowski	Fr
QB	10	Tyler Brause	Fr
QB	12	Morgan Newton	So
QB	14	Ryan Phillipi (*)	So
QB	15	Tyler Sargeant (*)	Jr
RB	4	Raymond Sanders	Fr
RB	20	Derrick Locke	Sr
RB	23	Donald Russell	So
RB	25	Jonathan George	Fr
RB	25	CoShick Williams (*)	So
RB	29	Brandon Gainer	Fr
FB	30	Moncell Allen	Sr
RB	32	Miles Simpson	Fr
RB	35	Chris Thomas (*)	Fr
RB	36	Andrew Joseph (*)	Fr
FB	37	Greg Meisner	Jr
FB	41	Brian Murphy (*)	Jr
FB	43	Stephen Ball (*)	Sr
FB	45	Tatum Lewis (*)	So
WR	3	Matt Roark	Jr
WR	8	Chris Matthews	Sr
WR	13	Gene McCaskill (injured)	Jr
WR	13	E. J. Jones (*)	Sr
WR	16	La'Rod King	So
WR	18	Randall Cobb	Jr
WR	19	EJ Fields	So
WR	22	Aaron Boyd	So
WR	31	Michael Harper (*)	Sr
WR	34	Ed Berry (*)	Fr
WR	48	Alex Dutton (*)	So
WR	49	Nathan Dutton (*)	So
WR	87	Brian Adams	Fr
WR	88	Nik Brazley (*)	Jr
TE	17	Jordan Aumiller	Fr
TE	42	Nick Melilo (*)	Jr
TE	80	Ronnie Shields	Fr
TE	82	Anthony Kendrick	Fr
TE	84	Gabe Correll	So
TE	85	Alex Smith	Fr
TE	89	Tyler Robinson	Fr
OT	52	Billy Joe Murphy	Jr
C	56	Sam Simpson	Fr
G	59	Dave Ulinski	So
C	63	Jake Lanefski	Jr
OT	66	Chandler Burden	Jr
G	67	Larry Warford	So
C	69	Matt Smith	So
G	70	Stuart Hines	Sr
G	71	Ian Anderson (*)	Fr
G	73	Stephen Duff (*)	Fr
OT	74	Trevino Woods	So
G	75	Brad Durham	Sr
OT	76	Teven Eatmon-Nared	Fr
C	77	Marcus Davis (*)	Sr
OT	79	Kevin Mitchell	Fr
OT	83	Ryan Wallace	So
G	89	Sean Stackhouse	So

Defense

Pos.	#	Name	Class
DE	45	Antwane Glenn	Jr
DE	51	Tristian Johnson	Fr
DT	53	Ricky Lumpkin	Sr
DE	55	DeQuin Evans	Sr
DT	60	Nermin Delic	Fr
DE	61	Alvin Davis	Fr
DT	65	Luke McDermott (*)	Jr
DT	78	Jacob Lewellen (*)	So
DT	86	Terrell Combs	Jr
DE	90	Justin Henderson	Fr
DT	91	Brice Laughlin	Fr
DT	92	Shane McCord	Sr
DT	93	Elliot Porter	Fr
DE	94	Taylor Wyndham	So
DE	95	Patrick Ligon	Fr
DE	96	Collins Ukwu	So
DT	97	Mister Cobble (I)	Fr
DT	98	Mark Crawford	Jr
DT	99	Donte Rumph	Fr
LB	2	Qua Huzzie	Fr
LB	39	Jewel Ratliff	Fr
LB	40	Avery Williamson	Fr
LB	41	Danny Trevathan	Jr
LB	46	Ronnie Sneed	Jr
LB	48	Ridge Wilson	So
LB	49	Antonio Thomas (*)	Jr
LB	54	Malcolm McDuffen	Fr
LB	57	Jacob Dufrene	Sr
LB	60	Chris Agomuo (*)	So
CB	1	Jerrell Priester	Fr
S	6	Taiedo Smith	Jr
CB	14	Anthony Mosley	Jr
S	11	Greg Wilson (*)	Jr
CB	15	Martavious Neloms	So
S	21	Winston Guy	Jr
CB	24	Randall Burden	Jr
S	28	Dakotah Tyler	Fr
CB	30	Zach Severance (*)	So
S	33	Josh Gibbs	Jr
CB	34	Dale Trimble	Fr
CB	35	Cartier Rice	So
CB	37	Christian Hudnell (*)	Fr
CB	38	Eric Simmons	Fr
S	41	Mychal Bailey	Jr
S	42	Will Letton (*)	Fr

Special teams

Pos.	#	Name	Class
P	9	Ryan Tydlacka	Jr
LS	59	Jon Thomas (*)	Jr
K	88	Joseph Mansour	Fr
K	93	Craig McIntosh (*)	So

Head coach

Joker Phillips

Coordinators/assistant coaches

See coaching staff

Legend

- (C) Team captain
- (S) Suspended
- (I) Ineligible
- (*) Walk-on
- Injured
- Redshirt

=== Depth chart ===
Vanderbilt game, November 8, 2010

Defense
2010 Kentucky Wildcats Football Depth Chart

FS
21 Winston Guy
6 Taiedo Smith

WLB	MLB	SLB
⋅	46 Ronnie Sneed	⋅
39 Jewell Ratliff	2 Qua Huzzie	⋅

SS
41 Mychal Bailey
33 Josh Gibbs

CB
15 Martavious Neloms
35 Cartier Rice

DE	DT	DT	DE
96 Collins Ukwu	68 Luke McDermott	53 Ricky Lumpkin	52 DeQuin Evans
90 Ronald Flemons	99 Donte Rumph	92 Shane McCord	94 Taylor Wyndham

CB
24 Randall Burden
14 Anthony Mosely

Offense
2010 Kentucky Wildcats Football Depth Chart

WR
8 Chris Matthews
3 Matt Roark

WR
16 La'Rod King
87 Brian Adams

LT	LG	C	RG	RT
66 Chandler Burden	70 Stuart Hines	69 Matt Smith	67 Larry Warford	75 Brad Durham
74 Trevino Woods	52 BJ Murphy	63 Jake Lanefski	77 Marcus Davis	52 BJ Murphy

TE
89 Tyler Robinson
86 Jordan Aumiller

WR
18 Randall Cobb
19 EJ Fields

QB
5 Mike Hartline
12 Morgan Newton

Special teams
PK 9 Ryan Tydlacka
PK 93 Craig McIntosh
P 9 Ryan Tydlacka
P 88 Joseph Mansour
KR 18 Randall Cobb
PR 18 Randall Cobb
LS 66 JJ Helton
H 18 Randall Cobb

RB
20 Derrick Locke
4 Raymond Sanders

== Class of 2011 commitments ==
College recruiting information
Name	Hometown	School	Height	Weight	40^{‡}	Commit date
Marcus Caffey; RB	Atlanta, Georgia	Grady	6 ft 0 in (1.83 m)	190 lb (86 kg)	N/A	Jan 13, 2011
Marcus Caffey; RB	Recruit ratings: Scout: Rivals: (77)					
Josh Clemons; RB	Fayetteville, Georgia	Whitewater	5 ft 10 in (1.78 m)	202 lb (92 kg)	N/A	Dec 24, 2010
Josh Clemons; RB	Recruit ratings: Scout: Rivals: (76)					
Theltus Cobbins; ATH	New Orleans, Louisiana	McDonough 35	6 ft 2 in (1.88 m)	190 lb (86 kg)	N/A	May 21, 2010
Theltus Cobbins; ATH	Recruit ratings: Scout: Rivals: (77)					
Christian Coleman; DE	Milan, Tennessee	Milan	6 ft 4 in (1.93 m)	255 lb (116 kg)	N/A	Jun 23, 2010
Christian Coleman; DE	Recruit ratings: Scout: Rivals: (76)					
Daryl Collins; WR	Gadsden, Alabama	Gadsden	6 ft 4 in (1.93 m)	200 lb (91 kg)	N/A	Feb 2, 2011
Daryl Collins; WR	Recruit ratings: Scout: Rivals: (79)					
Rashad Cunningham; WR	Mobile, Alabama	Davidson	6 ft 4 in (1.93 m)	200 lb (91 kg)	4.4	Aug 31, 2010
Rashad Cunningham; WR	Recruit ratings: Scout: Rivals: (74)					
Nile Daniel; WR	Griffin, Georgia	Griffin	6 ft 0 in (1.83 m)	185 lb (84 kg)	4.4	Jul 28, 2010
Nile Daniel; WR	Recruit ratings: Scout: Rivals: (74)					
Eric Dixon; S	Mobile, Alabama	Prichard	5 ft 11 in (1.80 m)	175 lb (79 kg)	4.5	Nov 19, 2010
Eric Dixon; S	Recruit ratings: Scout: Rivals: (78)					
Alvin Dupree; ATH	Irwinton, Georgia	Wilkinson County	6 ft 5 in (1.96 m)	220 lb (100 kg)	4.6	Jan 19, 2011
Alvin Dupree; ATH	Recruit ratings: Scout: Rivals: (77)					
James Elliot; OG	Pensacola, Florida	Pensacola Catholic	6 ft 4 in (1.93 m)	305 lb (138 kg)	N/A	Feb 2, 2011
James Elliot; OG	Recruit ratings: Scout: Rivals: (79)					
Glen Faulkner; S	East St. Louis, Illinois	East St. Louis	6 ft 2 in (1.88 m)	195 lb (88 kg)	N/A	Mar 4, 2010
Glen Faulkner; S	Recruit ratings: Scout: Rivals: (79)					
Josh Forrest; WR	Paducah, Kentucky	Paducah Tilghman	6 ft 4 in (1.93 m)	190 lb (86 kg)	N/A	May 17, 2010
Josh Forrest; WR	Recruit ratings: Scout: Rivals: (75)					
Daylen Hall; DB	Louisville, Kentucky	St. Xavier	5 ft 10 in (1.78 m)	170 lb (77 kg)	4.3	Jun 25, 2010
Daylen Hall; DB	Recruit ratings: Scout: Rivals: (71)					
Farrington Huguenin; DE	Columbia, South Carolina	Dreher	6 ft 4 in (1.93 m)	240 lb (110 kg)	N/A	Jan 29, 2010
Farrington Huguenin; DE	Recruit ratings: Scout: Rivals: (40)					
Jabari Johnson; LB	Stone Mountain, Georgia	Stephenson	6 ft 2 in (1.88 m)	220 lb (100 kg)	N/A	Oct 30, 2009
Jabari Johnson; LB	Recruit ratings: Scout: Rivals: (77)					
Ashely Lowery; S	Cleveland, Georgia	White County	6 ft 1 in (1.85 m)	190 lb (86 kg)	4.62	Aug 1, 2010
Ashely Lowery; S	Recruit ratings: Scout: Rivals: (75)					
Shaquille Love; DT	Harriman, Tennessee	Harriman	6 ft 5 in (1.96 m)	275 lb (125 kg)	N/A	Sep 28, 2010
Shaquille Love; DT	Recruit ratings: Scout: Rivals: (75)					
Darrian Miller; OT	Lexington, Kentucky	Bryan Station	6 ft 6 in (1.98 m)	265 lb (120 kg)	4.87	Dec 20, 2009
Darrian Miller; OT	Recruit ratings: Scout: Rivals: (79)					
Tim Patterson; LB	Louisville, Kentucky	Bryan Station	6 ft 4 in (1.93 m)	225 lb (102 kg)	4.6	Feb 3, 2009
Tim Patterson; LB	Recruit ratings: Scout: Rivals: (75)					
Demarius Rancifer; LB	Pensacola, Florida	Pensacola Catholic	6 ft 3 in (1.91 m)	220 lb (100 kg)	N/A	Jan 23, 2011
Demarius Rancifer; LB	Recruit ratings: Scout: Rivals: (77)					
Demarco Robinson; WR	Lithonia, Georgia	Martin Luther King	5 ft 10 in (1.78 m)	170 lb (77 kg)	4.5	Nov 25, 2010
Demarco Robinson; WR	Recruit ratings: Scout: Rivals: (77)					
Max Smith; QB	Van Nuys, California	Birmingham	6 ft 5 in (1.96 m)	220 lb (100 kg)	N/A	Apr 20, 2010
Max Smith; QB	Recruit ratings: Scout: Rivals: (74)					
Marcoreyon "Bubba" Tandy; ATH	Hopkinsville, Kentucky	Christian County	6 ft 1 in (1.85 m)	185 lb (84 kg)	N/A	Feb 2, 2011
Marcoreyon "Bubba" Tandy; ATH	Recruit ratings: Scout: Rivals: (45)					
Darrell Warren; DE	Alcoa, Tennessee	Alcoa	6 ft 2 in (1.88 m)	215 lb (98 kg)	N/A	Feb 1, 2011
Darrell Warren; DE	Recruit ratings: (40)					
David Washington; DE	Hampton, Georgia	Lovejoy	6 ft 3 in (1.91 m)	270 lb (120 kg)	N/A	Oct 20, 2010
David Washington; DE	Recruit ratings: Scout: Rivals: (74)					
Zach West; OT	Lexington, Kentucky	Lexington Christian	6 ft 5 in (1.96 m)	305 lb (138 kg)	N/A	Aug 25, 2010
Zach West; OT	Recruit ratings: Scout: Rivals: (79)					
Overall recruit ranking:
Note: In many cases, Scout, Rivals, 247Sports, On3, and ESPN may conflict in their listings of height and weight.; In these cases, the average was taken. ESPN grades are on a 100-point scale.; Sources: "Kentucky 2011 Football Commitments". Rivals.; "2011 Kentucky Football Commits". Scout.; "ESPN". ESPN.; "Scout.com Team Recruiting Rankings". Scout.; "2011 Team Ranking". Rivals.com.
