= 2010 Meineke Car Care Bowl =

South Florida Bulls	Clemson Tigers
(7–5)	(6–6)
Big East	ACC
31	26
Head coach: Skip Holtz	Head coach: Dabo Swinney
	1	2	3	4	Total
South Florida	7	10	7	7	31
Clemson	3	10	0	13	26
- Date: December 31, 2010
- Season: 2010
- Stadium: Bank of America Stadium
- Location: Charlotte, North Carolina
- MVP: BJ Daniels (USF)
- Favorite: Clemson by 5
- Referee: Tom Ritter (SEC)
- Attendance: 41,122
- Payout: US$1,000,000 per team

United States TV coverage
- Network: ESPN, ESPN3
- Announcers: Joe Tessitore, Brock Huard, Mike Bellotti and Shannon Spake

The 2010 Meineke Car Care Bowl was the ninth edition of the college football bowl game, and was played at Bank of America Stadium in Charlotte, North Carolina. The game started at 12:00 p.m. US EST on Friday, December 31, 2010, and featured the South Florida Bulls of the Big East Conference against the Clemson Tigers of the ACC. The bowl was telecasted on ESPN and ESPN3. This game was the last game of the series to be called the "Meineke Car Care Bowl", as the bowl organizers terminated their title sponsorship agreement with the parent company of Meineke, effective in 2011.

== Teams ==
=== South Florida ===
For the third straight season South Florida entered its bowl game with a 7–5 record. The 2010 Meineke Car Care Bowl marked the 6th straight season that the Bulls played in the postseason. After some struggles early on, the Bulls took off late. They won four of their final six, including an overtime victory at Miami, and nearly knocked off league champion Connecticut. This was South Florida's second appearance in the Meineke Car Care Bowl. They were a 14–0 loser to NC State in the 2005 game, the school's first ever bowl appearance.

=== Clemson ===
The Tigers came into the game with a 6–6 record following a 2009 season in which they were the ACC Atlantic Division Champions. Clemson ranked No. 9 nationally in scoring defense, allowing just 17.75 points per game, but lost three of their final five, including the season finale to rival South Carolina. This was the Tigers first appearance in the Meineke Car Care Bowl.

== Notes ==
The bowl game marked the first ever meeting between the two schools.
