= Mark Crawford =

American football player (born 1989)

No. 77, 99
- Position: Defensive lineman

Personal information
- Born: May 11, 1989 (age 37); Indianapolis, Indiana, U.S.
- Listed height: 6 ft 1 in (1.85 m)
- Listed weight: 325 lb (147 kg)

Career information
- High school: Indianapolis (IN) Ben Davis
- College: Kentucky
- NFL draft: 2012: undrafted

Career history
- Arizona Rattlers (2013); Jacksonville Sharks (2013); Los Angeles Kiss (2014)*; San Antonio Talons (2014); Nebraska Danger (2016)*; Iowa Barnstormers (2017–?)
- * Offseason or practice squad member only

Career AFL statistics
- Tackles: 4
- Stats at ArenaFan.com

Mark Randall Crawford (born May 11, 1989) is an American former football defensive lineman. He played college football at University of Kentucky and attended Ben Davis High School in Indianapolis, Indiana. He was a member of the Arizona Rattlers, Jacksonville Sharks, Los Angeles Kiss, San Antonio Talons, Nebraska Danger, and Iowa Barnstormers.

== College career ==
Crawford played for the Coffeyville Community College Red Ravens in 2007 and the Kentucky Wildcats from 2008 to 2011. He was the team's starter his final two years.

== Professional career ==
Pre-draft measurables
| Height | Weight | 40-yard dash | 10-yard split | 20-yard split | 20-yard shuttle | Three-cone drill | Vertical jump | Broad jump | Bench press |
|---|---|---|---|---|---|---|---|---|---|
| 6 ft 0 5/8 in (1.84 m) | 318 lb (144 kg) | 5.53 s | 1.89 s | 3.19 s | 5.19 s | 8.15 s | 21.5 in (0.55 m) | 7 ft 3 in (2.21 m) | 18 reps |
All values from Kentucky Pro Day

=== Arizona Rattlers ===
In 2013, Crawford was assigned to the Arizona Rattlers of the Arena Football League.

=== Jacksonville Sharks ===
On June 21, 2013, the Jacksonville Sharks claimed Crawford. Crawford played in the final 4 game for the Sharks.

=== Los Angeles KISS ===
On December 20, 2013, Crawford was selected by the Los Angeles KISS in the expansion draft.

=== San Antonio Talons ===
On February 23, 2014, Crawford and Jeremy Lewis were traded to the San Antonio Talons for Andre Jones, Joe Madsen, Jason Shirley, Darius Smith and Shawn Asiata. Crawford recorded just an assisted tackle during his time with the Talons. He was placed on recallable reassignment on March 27, 2014. Crawford appeared in two games for the Talons, including one start.

=== Nebraska Danger ===
On August 26, 2015, Crawford signed with the Nebraska Danger. He was released on February 23, 2016.

=== Iowa Barnstormers ===
On September 14, 2016, Crawford signed with the Iowa Barnstormers.
