= 2010 Cincinnati Bearcats football team =

American college football season

2010 Cincinnati Bearcats football
- Conference: Big East Conference
- Record: 4–8 (2–5 Big East)
- Head coach: Butch Jones (1st season)
- Offensive coordinator: Mike Bajakian (1st season)
- Offensive scheme: Multiple
- Co-defensive coordinators: Tim Banks (1st season); John Jancek (1st season)
- Base defense: 4–3
- Home stadium: Nippert Stadium; Paul Brown Stadium

2010 Big East Conference football standings
	Conf.			Overall
Team	W		L	W		L
Connecticut $+	5	–	2	8	–	5
West Virginia +	5	–	2	9	–	4
Pittsburgh +	5	–	2	8	–	5
Syracuse	4	–	3	8	–	5
South Florida	3	–	4	8	–	5
Louisville	3	–	4	7	–	6
Cincinnati	2	–	5	4	–	8
Rutgers	1	–	6	4	–	8
$ – BCS representative as conference champion; + – Conference co-champions; Rankings from AP Poll

The 2010 Cincinnati Bearcats football team represented the University of Cincinnati as a member of the Big East Conference during the 2010 NCAA Division I FBS football season. Led by first-year head coach Butch Jones, the Bearcats were compiled an overall record of 4–8 with a mark of 2–5 in conference play, placing seventh in the Big East. Cincinnati played six home games at Nippert Stadium and one at Paul Brown Stadium.

== Schedule ==
Date	Time	Opponent	Site	TV	Result	Attendance	Source
September 4	10:00 pm	at Fresno State*	Bulldog Stadium; Fresno, CA	ESPN2	L 14–28	37,238	
September 11	12:00 pm	Indiana State*	Nippert Stadium; Cincinnati, OH	FSN Ohio	W 40–7	30,807	
September 16	7:30 pm	at NC State*	Carter–Finley Stadium; Raleigh, NC	ESPN	L 19–30	55,934	
September 25	6:00 pm	No. 8 Oklahoma*	Paul Brown Stadium; Cincinnati, OH	ESPN2	L 29–31	58,253	
October 9	7:00 pm	Miami (OH)*	Nippert Stadium; Cincinnati, OH (Victory Bell)	ESPN3	W 45–3	33,909	
October 15	8:00 pm	at Louisville	Papa John's Cardinal Stadium; Louisville, KY (The Keg of Nails)	ESPN	W 35–27	55,106	
October 22	8:00 pm	South Florida	Nippert Stadium; Cincinnati, OH	ESPN2	L 30–38	32,670	
October 30	12:00 pm	Syracuse^{†}	Nippert Stadium; Cincinnati, OH	ESPNU	L 7–31	32,072	
November 13	12:00 pm	at West Virginia	Milan Puskar Stadium; Morgantown, WV	Big East Network	L 10–37	56,593	
November 20	7:30 pm	Rutgers	Nippert Stadium; Cincinnati, OH	Big East Network	W 69–38	30,265	
November 27	12:00 pm	at Connecticut	Rentschler Field; East Hartford, CT	Big East Network	L 17–38	40,000	
December 4	12:00 pm	Pittsburgh	Nippert Stadium; Cincinnati, OH (River City Rivalry)	ESPN	L 10–28	27,496	
*Non-conference game; ^{†}Homecoming; Rankings from AP Poll released prior to the game; All times are in Eastern time

== Game summaries ==
=== Fresno State ===
	1	2	3	4	Total
Cincinnati	7	7	0	0	14
Fresno State	0	14	7	7	28

=== Indiana State ===
	1	2	3	4	Total
Indiana State	0	7	0	0	7
Cincinnati	3	9	28	0	40

=== NC State ===
	1	2	3	4	Total
Cincinnati	0	7	0	12	19
NC State	14	6	3	7	30

=== Oklahoma ===
	1	2	3	4	Total
#9 Oklahoma	14	3	7	7	31
Cincinnati	3	6	3	17	29

=== Miami (Ohio) ===
	1	2	3	4	Total
Miami	0	3	0	0	3
Cincinnati	28	17	0	0	45

=== Louisville ===
	1	2	3	4	Total
Cincinnati	14	7	7	7	35
Louisville	14	10	0	3	27

=== South Florida ===
	1	2	3	4	Total
South Florida	0	17	14	7	38
Cincinnati	3	10	3	14	30

=== Syracuse ===
	1	2	3	4	Total
Syracuse	0	17	7	7	31
Cincinnati	0	7	0	0	7

=== West Virginia ===
	1	2	3	4	Total
Cincinnati	0	3	7	0	10
West Virginia	14	16	7	0	37

=== Rutgers ===
	1	2	3	4	Total
Rutgers	10	14	7	7	38
Cincinnati	20	21	14	14	69

=== Connecticut ===
	1	2	3	4	Total
Cincinnati	3	7	0	7	17
Connecticut	7	14	0	17	38

=== Pittsburgh ===
	1	2	3	4	Total
Pittsburgh	7	14	0	7	28
Cincinnati	0	10	0	0	10

== Awards and milestones ==
=== Big East Conference honors ===
==== Offensive player of the week ====
- Week 6: Armon Binns

==== Big East Conference All-Conference First Team ====
- Armon Binns, WR
- Zach Collaros, QB

==== Big East Conference All-Conference Second Team ====
- D.J. Woods, WR
- Jason Kelce, OL
- Ben Guidugli, TE
- Isaiah Pead, RB
- J.K. Schaffer, LB

== Players in the 2011 NFL draft ==
Player	Position	Round	Pick	NFL club
Jason Kelce	C	6	191	Philadelphia Eagles
