= 2010 Louisville Cardinals football team =

American college football season

2010 Louisville Cardinals football

Beef 'O' Brady's Bowl champion

Beef 'O' Brady's Bowl, W 31–28 vs. Southern Miss
- Conference: Big East Conference
- Record: 7–6 (3–4 Big East)
- Head coach: Charlie Strong (1st season)
- Offensive coordinator: Mike Sanford (1st season)
- Offensive scheme: Spread
- Defensive coordinator: Vance Bedford (1st season)
- Base defense: 4–3
- Home stadium: Papa John's Cardinal Stadium

2010 Big East Conference football standings
	Conf.			Overall
Team	W		L	W		L
Connecticut $+	5	–	2	8	–	5
West Virginia +	5	–	2	9	–	4
Pittsburgh +	5	–	2	8	–	5
Syracuse	4	–	3	8	–	5
South Florida	3	–	4	8	–	5
Louisville	3	–	4	7	–	6
Cincinnati	2	–	5	4	–	8
Rutgers	1	–	6	4	–	8
$ – BCS representative as conference champion; + – Conference co-champions; Rankings from AP Poll

The 2010 Louisville Cardinals football team represented the University of Louisville in the 2010 NCAA Division I FBS football season. The Cardinals were led by head coach Charlie Strong, who was in his first season. They played their home games at Papa John's Cardinal Stadium and were members of the Big East Conference. They finished the season 7–6, 3–4 in Big East play and were invited to the Beef 'O' Brady's Bowl, where they defeated Southern Miss, 31–28.

== Schedule ==
Date	Time	Opponent	Site	TV	Result	Attendance
September 4	3:30 p.m.	Kentucky*	Papa John's Cardinal Stadium; Louisville, Kentucky (Governor's Cup)	ABC	L 16–23	55,327
September 11	3:30 p.m.	Eastern Kentucky*	Papa John's Cardinal Stadium; Louisville, Kentucky	WHAS	W 23–13	51,427
September 18	5:30 p.m.	at Oregon State*	Reser Stadium; Corvallis, Oregon	FSNNW	L 28–35	45,379
October 2	7:00 p.m.	at Arkansas State*	ASU Stadium; Jonesboro, Arkansas	ESPN3	W 34–24	25,219
October 9	2:00 p.m.	Memphis*^{†}	Papa John's Cardinal Stadium; Louisville, Kentucky (rivalry)	ESPN3	W 56–0	48,427
October 15	8:00 p.m.	Cincinnati	Papa John's Cardinal Stadium; Louisville, Kentucky (Keg of Nails)	ESPN	L 27–35	55,106
October 23	3:30 p.m.	Connecticut	Papa John's Cardinal Stadium; Louisville, Kentucky	ESPNU	W 26–0	48,591
October 30	12:00 p.m.	at Pittsburgh	Heinz Field; Pittsburgh, Pennsylvania	ESPN3	L 3–20	48,562
November 6	12:00 p.m.	at Syracuse	Carrier Dome; Syracuse, New York	ESPN3	W 28–20	40,735
November 13	12:00 p.m.	South Florida	Papa John's Cardinal Stadium; Louisville, Kentucky	ESPNU	L 21–24 ^{OT}	43,887
November 20	12:00 p.m.	West Virginia	Papa John's Cardinal Stadium; Louisville, Kentucky	ESPN3	L 10–17	51,772
November 26	11:00 a.m.	at Rutgers	Rutgers Stadium; Piscataway, New Jersey	ESPN2	W 40–13	37,422
December 21	8:00 pm	vs. Southern Miss*	Tropicana Field; St. Petersburg, Florida (Beef 'O' Brady's Bowl)	ESPN	W 31–28	20,017
*Non-conference game; ^{†}Homecoming; All times are in Eastern time
