= 2010 Rutgers Scarlet Knights football team =

American college football season

2010 Rutgers Scarlet Knights football
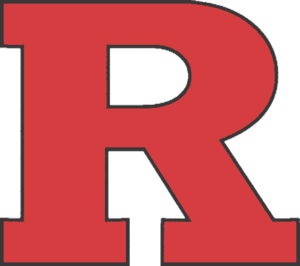
- Conference: Big East Conference
- Record: 4–8 (1–6 Big East)
- Head coach: Greg Schiano (10th season)
- Co-offensive coordinators: Kirk Ciarrocca (2nd season); Kyle Flood (2nd season)
- Offensive scheme: Pro spread
- Co-defensive coordinators: Bob Fraser (2nd season); Ed Pinkham (2nd season)
- Base defense: 4–3
- Home stadium: Rutgers Stadium

2010 Big East Conference football standings
	Conf.			Overall
Team	W		L	W		L
Connecticut $+	5	–	2	8	–	5
West Virginia +	5	–	2	9	–	4
Pittsburgh +	5	–	2	8	–	5
Syracuse	4	–	3	8	–	5
South Florida	3	–	4	8	–	5
Louisville	3	–	4	7	–	6
Cincinnati	2	–	5	4	–	8
Rutgers	1	–	6	4	–	8
$ – BCS representative as conference champion; + – Conference co-champions; Rankings from AP Poll

The 2010 Rutgers Scarlet Knights football team represented Rutgers University in the 2010 NCAA Division I FBS college football season. The Scarlet Knights were led by head coach Greg Schiano in his 10th season. They played their home games at Rutgers Stadium and are members of the Big East Conference. They finished the season 4–8, 1–6 in Big East play.

== Schedule ==
Date	Time	Opponent	Site	TV	Result	Attendance	Source
September 2	7:30 pm	Norfolk State*	Rutgers Stadium; Piscataway, NJ	ESPN3	W 31–0	46,311	
September 11	8:00 pm	at FIU *	FIU Stadium; Miami, FL	Big East Network	W 19–14	19,872	
September 25	3:30 pm	North Carolina*	Rutgers Stadium; Piscataway, NJ	ESPNU	L 13–17	52,038	
October 2	2:00 pm	Tulane*	Rutgers Stadium; Piscataway, NJ	ESPN3	L 14–17	47,963	
October 8	7:30 pm	Connecticut	Rutgers Stadium; Piscataway, NJ	ESPN	W 27–24	48,431	
October 16	2:00 pm	vs. Army*	Meadowlands Stadium; East Rutherford, NJ	ESPN3	W 23–20 ^{OT}	41,292	
October 23	12:00 pm	at Pittsburgh	Heinz Field; Pittsburgh, PA	Big East Network	L 21–41	50,425	
November 3	7:00 pm	at South Florida	Raymond James Stadium; Tampa, FL	ESPN2	L 27–28	39,465	
November 13	3:30 pm	Syracuse	Rutgers Stadium; Piscataway, NJ	ESPNU	L 10–13	49,911	
November 20	7:30 pm	at Cincinnati	Nippert Stadium; Cincinnati, OH	Big East Network	L 38–69	30,265	
November 26	11:00 am	Louisville	Rutgers Stadium; Piscataway, NJ	ESPN2	L 13–40	37,422	
December 4	12:00 pm	at West Virginia	Milan Puskar Stadium; Morgantown, WV	ABC	L 14–35	48,386	
*Non-conference game; All times are in Eastern time

== During the season ==
During the October 16 game vs Army, defensive tackle Eric LeGrand suffered a spinal cord injury. He underwent emergency surgery to stabilize his spine at Hackensack University Medical Center. He is paralyzed from the neck down, but has regained sensation throughout his body, which might lead to a more complete recovery.

This tragedy clearly affected the team's play: While they held on to defeat Army and raise their record to 4-2, when in the aftermath of that game the extent of LeGrand's injury became apparent, it contributed to sending RU into a funk that resulted in a six-game losing streak to end the season.
