= L&N Federal Credit Union Stadium =

Stadium at the University of Louisville

- Cardinal Stadium
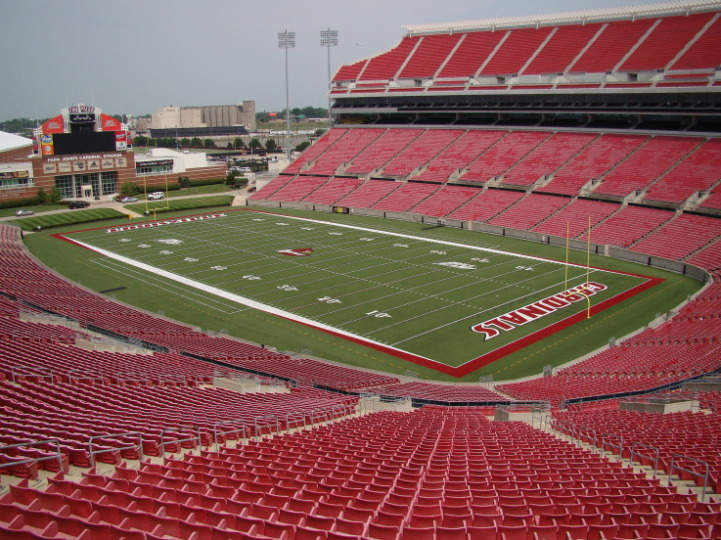
- The stadium after its expansion in 2010
- Interactive map of L&N Federal Credit Union Stadium
- Former names: Papa John's Cardinal Stadium (1998–2018); Cardinal Stadium (2018–2023)
- Location: 2800 South Floyd Street; Louisville, Kentucky 40209
- Coordinates: 38°12′21″N 85°45′32″W
- Owner: University of Louisville
- Operator: University of Louisville
- Capacity: 60,800
- Surface: FieldTurf Revolution
- Record attendance: 59,225 (November 25, 2023)

Construction
- Groundbreaking: June 19, 1996
- Opened: September 5, 1998
- Expanded: 2010, 2018
- Cost: $135 million ($267 million in 2025 dollars)
- Architects: Rosser International; Luckett & Farley
- General contractor: Huber, Hunt & Nichols

Tenant
- Louisville Cardinals (NCAA) (1998–present)

Website
- landnstadium.com

L&N Federal Credit Union Stadium, also known as L&N Stadium and formerly known as Cardinal Stadium and Papa John's Cardinal Stadium, is a football stadium located in Louisville, Kentucky, United States, on the southern end of the campus of the University of Louisville. Debuting in 1998, it serves as the home of the Louisville Cardinals football program. The official seating capacity in the quasi-horseshoe-shaped facility was 42,000 through the 2008 season. An expansion project that started after the 2008 season was completed in time for the 2010 season and brought the official capacity to 55,000. An additional expansion project aiming to close the open end of the horseshoe to add 6,000 additional seats was announced on August 28, 2015, and was completed in 2019.

== History and fundraising ==
Due to the Kentucky General Assembly being unable to provide any public funding, construction of the stadium began with private funds, which included the reclamation of the land upon which the South Louisville Rail Yard was situated. The soils of the 92-acre (37 ha) brownfield site contained 47 different contaminants of concern before the project began. The rail yard's shift horn was saved and installed in the stadium's north end zone scoreboard and is sounded whenever the Cardinals score.

The new parking at the stadium allowed many commuting students more parking access. This ultimately led to more redevelopment of on-campus parking lots, turning them into various athletic facilities.

In 2000, Central Avenue was widened and extended from Taylor Boulevard to Crittenden Drive, a major redevelopment project. Because the road connected Churchill Downs, an entrance to the Kentucky Exposition Center (which is home to Freedom Hall) and the university's new baseball venue, Jim Patterson Stadium, all located within a mile of each other, the road has now been dubbed as "Louisville's Sports Corridor".

The stadium was named for old Cardinal Stadium, which was located at the Kentucky Exposition Center, but with corporate naming rights formerly providing a prefix to the main name. John Schnatter, a native of nearby Jeffersonville, Indiana, donated $5 million for the naming rights to the stadium, which he used to christen the venue for his Papa John's Pizza chain. Schnatter made a further $10 million donation for the stadium's expansion, and extended the naming rights to the year 2040.

The stadium was christened on September 5, 1998; the Cardinals lost the opening game to the Kentucky Wildcats 68–34 but won all other home games that year.

On July 13, 2018, the stadium was renamed Cardinal Stadium by University of Louisville President Neeli Bendapudi. The change was a reaction to Schnatter using a racial slur on a Papa John's conference call.

On January 30, 2023, the stadium was renamed L&N Federal Credit Union Stadium. A 20-year, $41.3 million naming rights agreement between the university and financial institution was officially announced during a U of L board of trustees meeting. The stadium site of the former South Louisville Rail Yard is also the original site of the credit union, founded in 1954 to serve L&N Railroad workers but now serving the Louisville metropolitan area, as well as the Cincinnati–Northern Kentucky area and several counties in southeast Kentucky.

=== Stadium expansion ===
==== Flight Deck and Norton's Terrace ====
In October 2006, an official rendering and details were released of what an expanded stadium would look like and cost. The ambitious original plan called for an additional 21,600 seats and 70 suites added via a new upper deck on the side opposite the main press box area, all for an estimated price tag of $63 million, which is almost identical to the cost to build the original stadium.

On August 27, 2007, John Schnatter donated $10 million in support of the expansion, and extended naming rights through 2040. The Kentucky General Assembly, the state legislature, provided the balance of funding for the project. The stadium is therefore about 46% state-funded in total.

On December 1, 2008, construction started on the east side of the stadium, and the expansion was finished in Fall 2010. The expansion was scaled down from the original plans with about 13,000 additional seats (1,725 of which are higher-priced club seats) and 33 suites instead of the originally planned 70. There is also a 100-yard-long luxury room called the PNC Club, which is similar to the west-side Brown & Williamson Club but has a glassed-in view of the field. There is also standing space for 2,500 people on the new Norton Healthcare Terrace located on the south end (closed end) of the horseshoe-shaped stadium. The expansion, which eventually cost $72 million, also included 20 new rest rooms, two new 345' x 3' LED ribbon boards located on the fascia of the east and west sides of the stadium, a new 60' x 20' LED video board on the south end of the stadium, matching in size the existing board on the north end, and a new 13 x 9 LED board facing outside the stadium to the south.

==== North End Zone ====
In November 2013, the University of Louisville announced it was accepting bids from organizations looking to study the possibility of adding seats to the North end zone of Cardinal Stadium. Former head coach Charlie Strong stated in September 2013 that he would like to see the stadium enclosed at the North end zone. The Stadium was originally designed with the ability to expand up to 80,000 seats.

The University of Louisville announced on December 1, 2014, that supporters matched a $3 million gift given by Thorntons Inc. to construct a new academic center underneath the Norton Terrace. Construction of the facility began in spring 2016 and the facility opened in August 2016. It houses all academic functions for the university's athletic department and place classes for student-athletes under one roof. The 40,000-square-foot (3,700 m^{2}) facility includes tutorial space, laboratories, and offices and classrooms to serve more than 750 student-athletes across the university's 23 sports.

The University of Louisville announced on August 28, 2015, that a new planned expansion would add 10,000 additional seats to the stadium at the north end zone, which would have brought the total number of seats in the stadium to 65,000; however, the university later decided to allocate seating space to other amenities so that only about 6,000 seats would be added in this project. The football team continued playing in the stadium during construction, and the project was completed in 2019. The expansion added 10 field-level suites, 65 box seats at the club level, and 1,000 club seats with a VIP gathering area.

== Football attendance records ==
The single-game attendance record of 59,225 spectators was set on November 25, 2023, in a loss to rival Kentucky.

The following is a list of the ten highest single-game attendance figures in the venue's history, as of the 2024 season.

No.	Opponent	Date	Attendance	Event
1.	Kentucky	November 25, 2023	59,225	2023 Regular Season
2.	Miami	October 19, 2024	59,115	2024 Regular Season
3.	Notre Dame	October 7, 2023	59,081	2023 Regular Season
4.	Notre Dame	September 2, 2019	58,187	2019 Regular Season
5.	Florida State	September 17, 2016	55,632	2016 Regular Season
6.	Clemson	September 16, 2017	55,588	2017 Regular Season
7.	Miami	September 1, 2014	55,428	2014 Regular Season
8.	Florida State	October 30, 2014	55,414	2014 Regular Season
9.	Clemson	September 17, 2015	55,396	2015 Regular Season
10.	Kentucky	September 2, 2012	55,386	2012 Regular Season

The following is a list of additional single-game attendance figures in the venue's history, as of the 2024 season. Some of these figures previously held the single-game attendance record.

1. 55,332 vs. Ohio, September 1, 2013
2. 55,327 vs. Kentucky, September 4, 2010
3. 55,218 vs. NC State, October 22, 2016
4. 55,215 vs. UCF, October 18, 2013
5. 55,168 vs. Rutgers, October 10, 2013
6. 55,121 vs. Duke, October 14, 2016
7. 55,118 vs. Kentucky, November 29, 2014
8. 55,106 vs. Cincinnati, October 15, 2010
9. 55,018 vs. Kentucky, November 27, 2021
10. 54,923 vs. Western Kentucky, September 15, 2018
11. 54,075 vs. Kentucky, November 26, 2016
12. 53,647 vs. Eastern Kentucky, September 7, 2013
13. 53,334 vs. North Carolina, September 15, 2012

== Physical features ==
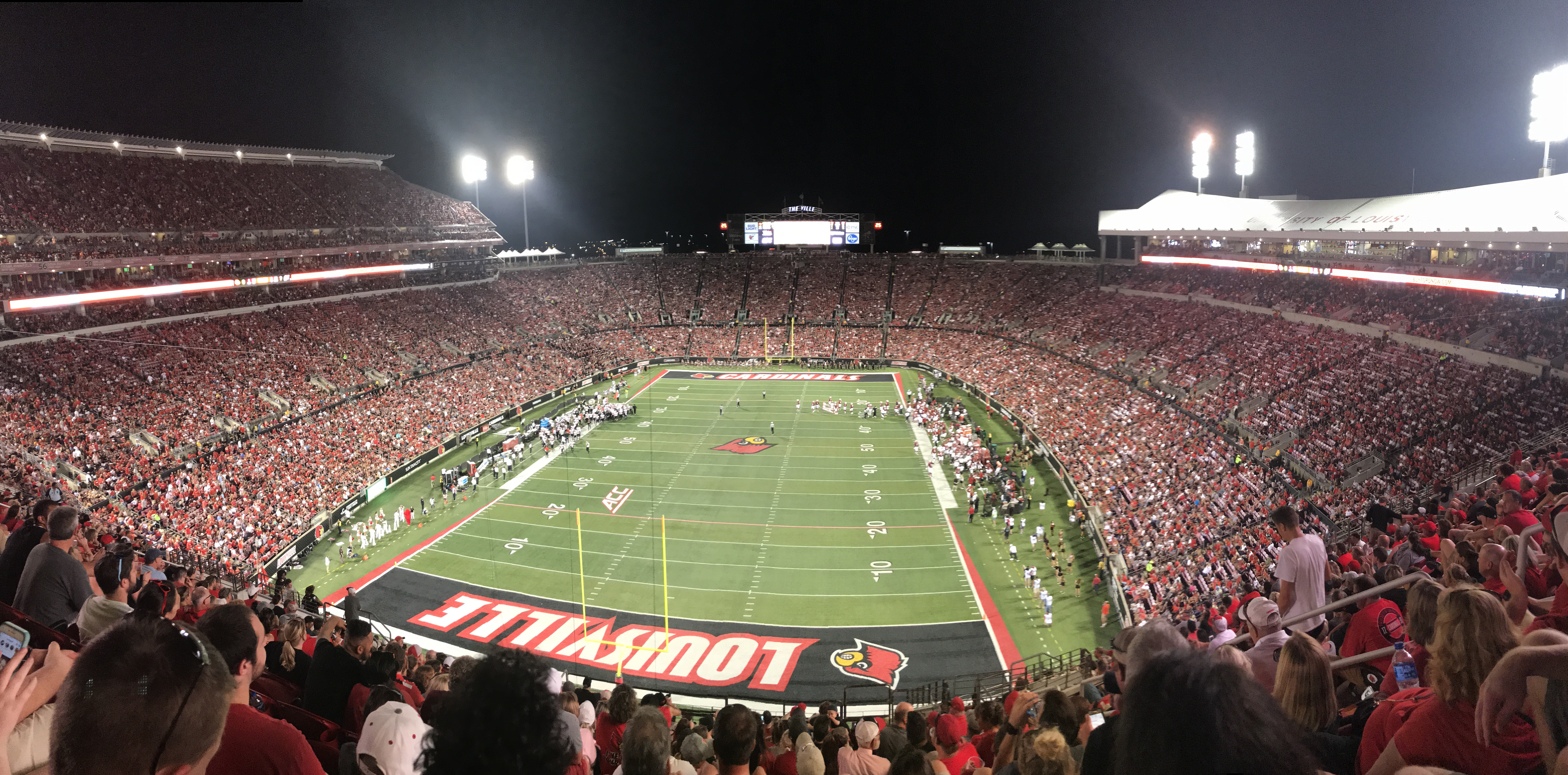
A game at Cardinal Stadium in October 2018

At the north end of the stadium is the Howard Schnellenberger Football Complex, which houses the football offices and the conditioning center for the football team. The seating expansion in the North end zone is loosely based on the North end zone seating structure of the NFL's Seattle Seahawks Lumen Field. In 2006 the $10 million Trager Center, an indoor practice facility opened just north of the Schnellenberger Complex, providing a dry and warm area to allow undisrupted practices in Louisville's highly variable weather.

An interesting feature is the Brown and Williamson Club located at the rear of the stadium's press box. It contains several large ball rooms and is rented out for receptions to bring in additional revenue. It is also often used by the school to host prominent visiting speakers. The venue overlooks the school's new Jim Patterson Stadium and Jewish Hospital Sports Medicine complex, which was completed in 2005.

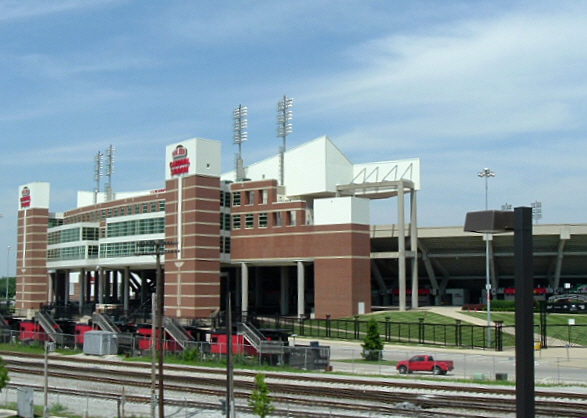
Entrance to the stadium in 2006

At the start of the 2006 football season, a new state-of-the-art HD scoreboard was installed in the north end zone. It is three times as large as the previous scoreboard. A new red LED scoreboard was also installed in the south end zone, as was a lighted "University of Louisville" sign around the upper rim of the exterior of the east stands, which increases the stadium's visibility from Interstate 65.

Also at the sound end is a bronze statue of Johnny Unitas, NFL great and the most famous football alumnus of the university. The statue, now standing in front of the scoreboard and above the seats, was moved from the north end in 2017 during a construction project. Prior to the move, as a tradition, Louisville players would touch the statue on their way from the Howard Schnellenberger Football Complex to the field.

== Uses other than Louisville football ==
The stadium has hosted many events apart from U of L football, among them soccer matches, including fixtures for the US women's national team; concerts; auto shows; and the annual DCI Louisville drum & bugle corps competition, hosting several corps from the midwest.

=== High school football ===
In high school football, it has hosted a local event known as the Ray Adams Charger Classic, plus various other games. Most notably, Cardinal Stadium is the regular host of two major city rivalries—the Catholic rivalry between St. Xavier and Trinity, which regularly draws crowds in the 35,000 range; and the Male-Manual game, a public-school battle which is the longest running, continuously played high school football rivalry in America. It was also the annual site of the Kentucky state high school football championship games until the 2009 season, when the games were moved to Houchens Industries–L. T. Smith Stadium at Western Kentucky University in Bowling Green. Eventually, they were moved to Kroger Field at the University of Kentucky.

=== Soccer ===
The Stadium has hosted multiple US Women's National Soccer Team fixtures.

=== Other events ===
The venue has also seen use for large religious events. Evangelist Billy Graham held one of his crusades at the stadium. The Bands of America Louisville Regional Championships, have also been held at the stadium numerous times, since 2004, hosting marching bands from Indiana, Ohio, Illinois, Kentucky, and other states around the region.

The stadium hosted Nitro Circus Live on July 9, 2016.

== See also ==
- List of NCAA Division I FBS football stadiums
- List of attractions and events in the Louisville metropolitan area
- List of American football stadiums by capacity
- Lists of stadiums
