= 2011 Minnesota Vikings season =

51st season in franchise history

- Owner: Zygi Wilf
- Head coach: Leslie Frazier
- Home stadium: Mall of America Field at Hubert H. Humphrey Metrodome

Results
- Record: 3–13
- Division place: 4th NFC North
- Playoffs: Did not qualify
- Pro Bowlers: DE Jared Allen; LB Chad Greenway (alternate)

Uniform
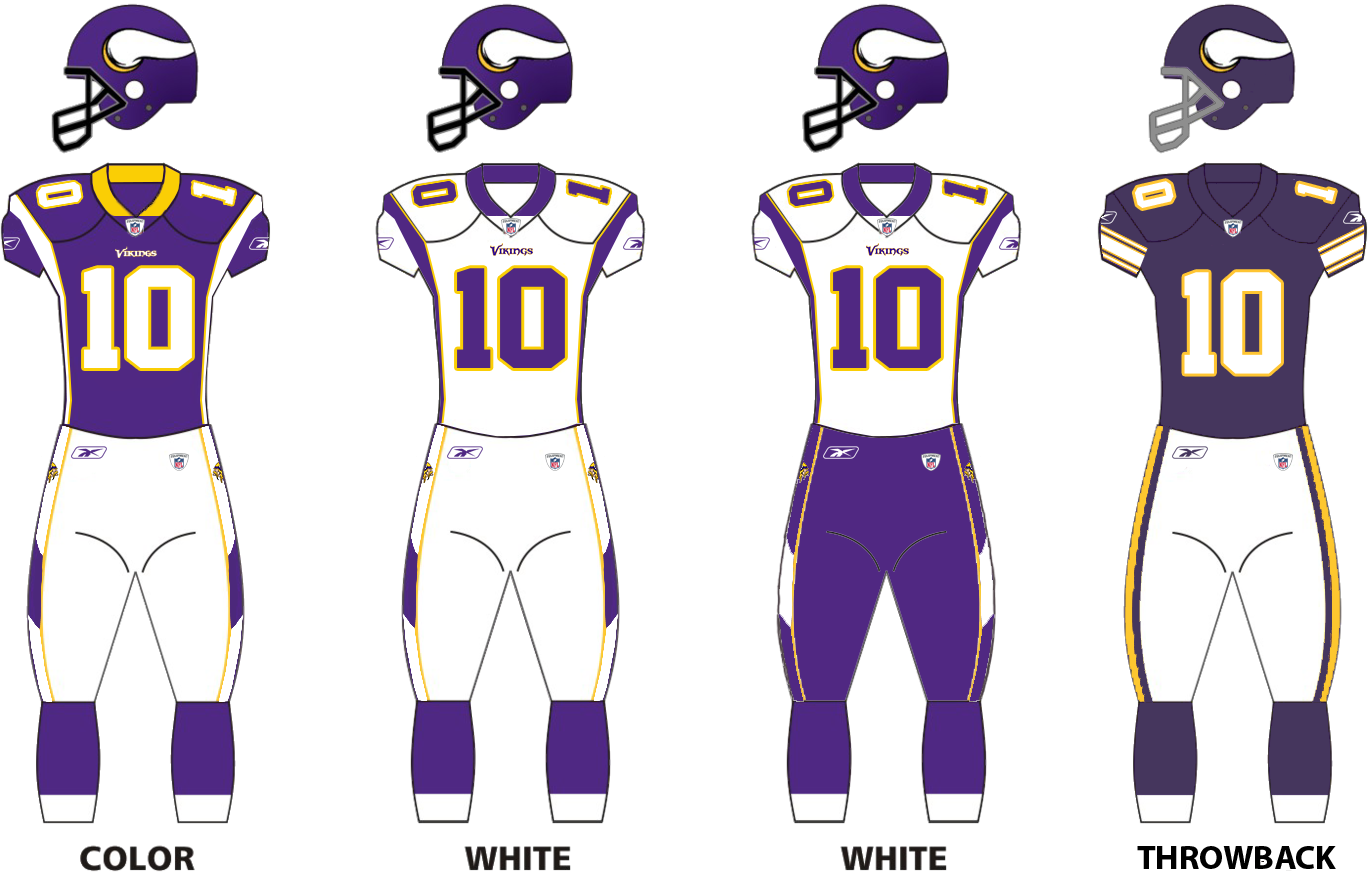

The 2011 season was the Minnesota Vikings' 51st in the National Football League (NFL), and the first full season under head coach Leslie Frazier, who served as the team's interim head coach for the final six games of the 2010 season. The team failed to improve on their 6–10 record from 2010, going 2–6 before their bye week, before being eliminated from playoff contention in week 12 with a 2–9 record. The team also suffered its first six-game losing streak since the 1984 season.

The team started the season with a new starting quarterback, Donovan McNabb, who had enjoyed great success with the Eagles but had a subpar year with the Redskins in 2010. McNabb played respectably, having a passer rating of 82.9 and only turning the ball over twice, but his 1–5 record as starter led to him being benched in favor of rookie Christian Ponder in Week 6, and McNabb was later waived on December 1, 2011. Despite a poor year for the team as a whole, Jared Allen set a franchise record for most sacks in a season with 22. The team led the league in sacks with 50, but also tied a team record for fewest interceptions caught in a season with only eight.

== Offseason ==
=== Players Additions ===
- Michael Jenkins-signed from the Atlanta Falcons.
- Scott Kooistra-signed from the Baltimore Ravens.
- Donovan McNabb-signed from the Washington Redskins.

=== Players lost ===
- Ryan Cook-signed with the Miami Dolphins.
- Ray Edwards-signed with the Atlanta Falcons.
- Brett Favre-Announced to retire.
- Heath Farwell-signed with the Seattle Seahawks.
- Tarvaris Jackson-signed with the Seattle Seahawks.
- Jimmy Kennedy-signed with the New York Giants.
- Ben Leber-signed with the St. Louis Rams.
- Bryant McKinnie-signed with the Baltimore Ravens.
- Sidney Rice-signed with the Seattle Seahawks.
- Lito Sheppard-signed with the Oakland Raiders.
- Frank Walker-signed with the Tennessee Titans.
- Madieu Williams-signed with the San Francisco 49ers.
- Pat Williams-Announced to retire.

=== 2011 draft ===
After finishing with a 6–10 record in the 2010 season, the Vikings were allocated the 12th pick in the 2011 NFL Draft.

Pro Bowler

2011 Minnesota Vikings Draft
Draft order		Player name	Position	College	Contract	Notes
Round	Overall	Player name	Position	College	Contract	Notes
1	12	Christian Ponder	QB	Florida State	4 years	
2	43	Kyle Rudolph	TE	Notre Dame	4 years	
3	74	Traded to the New England Patriots (Note: The Vikings traded their third-round selection (74th overall) to the Patriots in exchange for WR Randy Moss and a 2012 seventh-round selection (223rd overall).)				
4	106	Christian Ballard	DE	Iowa	4 years	
5	139	Brandon Burton	CB	Utah	4 years	
5	150	Traded to the Cleveland Browns (Note: The Vikings traded their fifth-round selection (150th overall) to the Browns in exchange for two sixth-round selections (168th and 170th overall).)				From Giants (Note: The Vikings traded RB Darius Reynaud and QB Sage Rosenfels to the Giants in exchange for the a fifth-round selection (150th overall) and a conditional 2012 seventh-round selection, which was not exercised.)
6	168	DeMarcus Love	OT	Arkansas	4 years	From Broncos, via Browns
6	170	Mistral Raymond	S	South Florida	4 years	From Browns
6	172	Brandon Fusco	C	Slippery Rock	4 years	
6	200	Ross Homan	LB	Ohio State	4 years	Compensatory pick (Note: The Vikings were awarded two compensatory picks for the loss of free agent G Artis Hicks and RB Chester Taylor.)
7	215	D'Aundre Reed	DE	Arizona	4 years	
7	236	Stephen Burton	WR	West Texas A&M	4 years	Compensatory pick

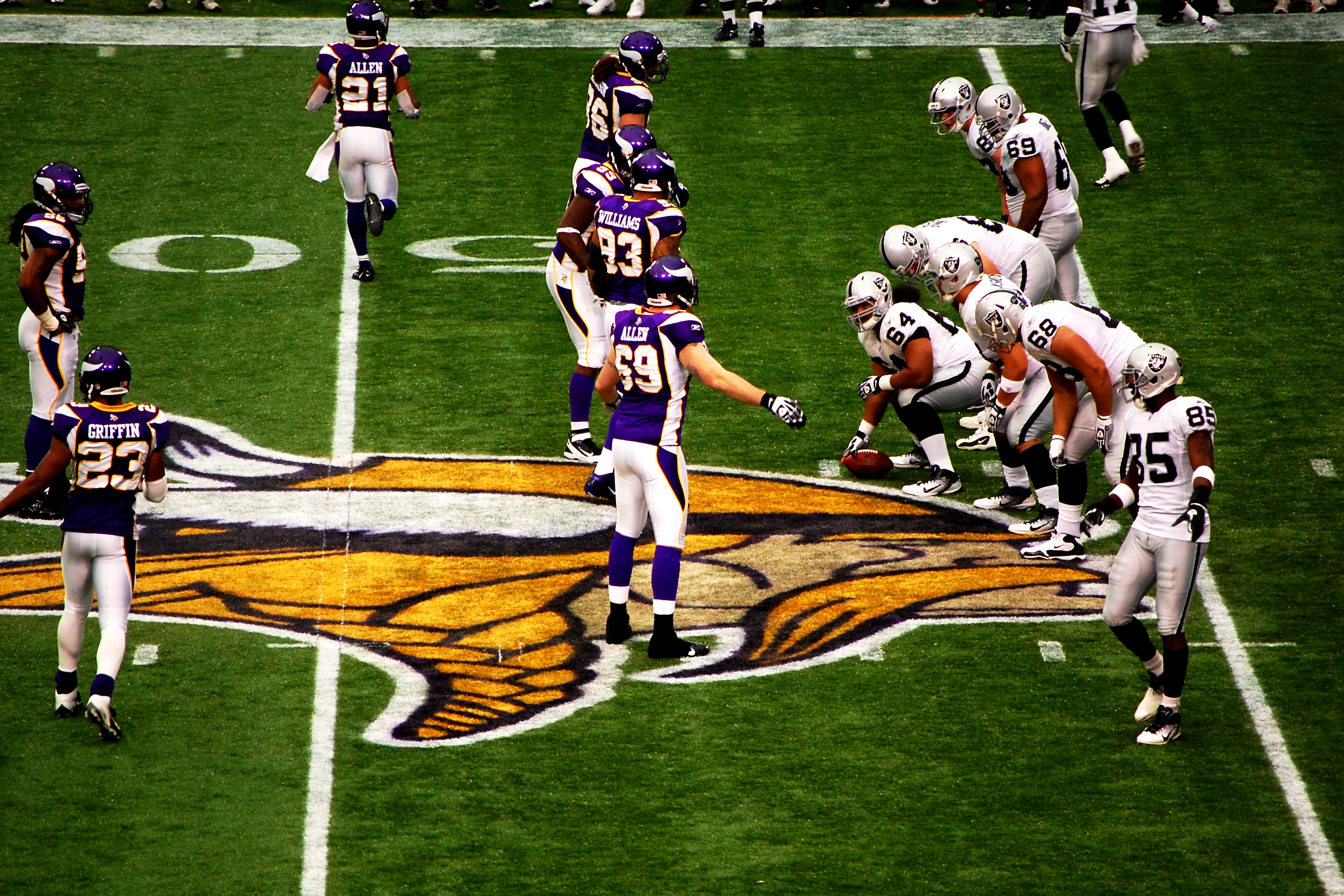
Oakland at Minnesota in week 11

=== Undrafted free agents ===
Player	Position	College
Chris Adingupu	Safety	Prairie View A&M
David Akinniyi	Defensive end	North Carolina State
Conan Amituiana	Guard	Arizona
Matt Asiata	Running back	Utah
Larry Dean	Linebacker	Valdosta State
Marcell Gipson	Cornerback	Wyoming
Ryan Hill	Safety	Miami (FL)
Andre Holmes	Wide receiver	Hillsdale
Rod Huntley	Guard	Texas-El Paso
Byron Isom	Guard	Auburn
Dominique Johnson	Wide receiver	Cal Poly
Allen Reisner	Tight end	Iowa
Devon Torrance	Cornerback/Safety	Ohio State
Nathan Whitaker	Kicker	Stanford

== Staff ==
Minnesota Vikings 2011 staff
Front office: Owner/chairman – Zygi Wilf; Owner/president – Mark Wilf; Owner/vice chairman – Leonard Wilf; Vice president of football operations – Rob Brzezinski; Vice president of player personnel – Rick Spielman; Director of player personnel – George Paton; Director of college scouting – Scott Studwell; Assistant director of college scouting – Jamaal Stephenson; Head coaches: Head coach – Leslie Frazier; Assistant to the head coach – Cameron Turner; Offensive coaches: Offensive coordinator – Bill Musgrave; Quarterbacks – Craig Johnson; Assistant quarterbacks – Kevin Stefanski; Running backs – James Saxon; Wide receivers – George Stewart; Assistant wide receivers – Ryan Ficken; Tight ends – Jimmie Johnson; Offensive line – Jeff Davidson; Assistant offensive line – Ryan Silverfield	Defensive coaches: Defensive coordinator – Fred Pagac; Defensive line – Karl Dunbar; Assistant defensive line – Diron Reynolds; Linebackers – Mike Singletary; Defensive backs/secondary – Joe Woods; Assistant defensive backs/secondary – Matt Sheldon; Defensive assistant – Jeff Imamura; Special teams coaches: Special teams coordinator – Mike Priefer; Assistant special teams – Chris White; Strength and conditioning: Head athletic trainer/director of sports medicine – Eric Sugarman; Strength and conditioning – Tom Kanavy; Assistant strength and conditioning – Juney Barnett; Assistant strength and conditioning – Martin Streight; Assistant strength and conditioning – Chaz Mahle

== Roster ==
2011 Minnesota Vikings roster
Quarterbacks (QB): 7 Christian Ponder; 18 Sage Rosenfels; 14 Joe Webb; Running backs (RB): 27 Lorenzo Booker KR; 44 Ryan D'Imperio FB; 32 Toby Gerhart; 38 Caleb King; 29 Jordan Todman; Wide receivers (WR): 16 Emmanuel Arceneaux; 19 Devin Aromashodu; 85 Greg Camarillo; 12 Percy Harvin KR; Tight ends (TE): 40 Jim Kleinsasser; 82 Kyle Rudolph; 81 Visanthe Shiancoe; 86 Mickey Shuler	Offensive linemen (OL): 61 Joe Berger C/G; 79 Patrick Brown T; 63 Brandon Fusco G; 64 Anthony Herrera G; 74 Charlie Johnson T; 71 Phil Loadholt T; 75 DeMarcus Love T; 65 John Sullivan C; Defensive linemen (DL): 69 Jared Allen DE; 92 Remi Ayodele DT; 99 Christian Ballard DT; 90 Fred Evans DT; 97 Everson Griffen DE; 98 Letroy Guion DT; 91 D'Aundre Reed DE; 96 Brian Robison DE; 93 Kevin Williams DT	Linebackers (LB): 57 Xavier Adibi MLB; 51 Larry Dean OLB; 52 Chad Greenway OLB; 56 E. J. Henderson MLB; 50 Erin Henderson OLB; 55 Kenny Onatolu OLB; Defensive backs (DB): 21 Asher Allen CB; 36 Brandon Burton CB; 31 Chris Cook CB; 37 Eric Frampton SS; 23 Cedric Griffin CB; 24 Jarrad Page FS; 41 Mistral Raymond FS; 33 Jamarca Sanford SS; 22 Benny Sapp CB; 34 Andrew Sendejo FS; 35 Marcus Sherels CB/PR; Special teams (ST): 48 Matt Katula LS; 4 Chris Kluwe P; 8 Ryan Longwell K	Practice squad: 17 Kris Adams WR; 72 Chris DeGeare G; 20 Reggie Jones CB; 68 Butch Lewis T; 59 Tyrone McKenzie LB; 89 Allen Reisner TE; 15 Kerry Taylor WR; Reserve: 39 Husain Abdullah FS (IR); 54 Jasper Brinkley MLB (IR); 11 Stephen Burton WR (IR); 76 Steve Hutchinson G (IR); 84 Michael Jenkins WR (IR); 25 Tyrell Johnson S (IR); 73 Scott Kooistra T (IR); 46 Cullen Loeffler LS (IR); 28 Adrian Peterson RB (IR); 26 Antoine Winfield CB (IR); Rookies in italics 53 active, 10 reserve, 7 practice squad

== Preseason ==
=== Schedule ===
The Vikings' preseason schedule was announced on April 12, 2011.

Week	Date	Opponent	Result	Record	Game site	NFL.com recap
1	August 13	at Tennessee Titans	L 3–14	0–1	LP Field	Recap
2	August 20	at Seattle Seahawks	W 20–7	1–1	CenturyLink Field	Recap
3	August 27	Dallas Cowboys	L 17–23	1–2	Mall of America Field	Recap
4	September 1	Houston Texans	W 28–0	2–2	Mall of America Field	Recap

=== Game summaries ===
==== Week 1: at Tennessee Titans ====
Preseason Week 1: Minnesota Vikings at Tennessee Titans – Game summary

Quarter	1	2	3	4	Total
Vikings	0	0	3	0	3
Titans	0	14	0	0	14

at LP Field, Nashville, Tennessee

- Date: August 13
- Game time: 19:00
- Game weather: Sunny, 82 °F (28 °C)
- Game attendance: 69,143
- Referee: Scott Green (19)
- TV announcers (KARE-11): Ari Wolfe, Mike Mayock and Randy Shaver
- Recap, Game Book

Game information

First quarter

- No scoring plays

Second quarter

- TEN – Yamon Figurs 45-yard pass from Jake Locker (Rob Bironas kick), 4:55. Titans 7–0. Drive: 1 play, 45 yards, 0:08.
- TEN – Jamie Harper 2-yard run (Rob Bironas kick), 1:47. Titans 14–0. Drive: 4 plays, 37 yards, 1:36.

Third quarter

- MIN – Ryan Longwell 37-yard field goal, 9:32. Titans 14–3. Drive: 11 plays, 59 yards, 5:28.

Fourth quarter

- No scoring plays

Top passers

- MIN – Christian Ponder – 8/13, 84 yards
- TEN – Jake Locker – 7/10, 89 yards, TD

Top rushers

- MIN – Lorenzo Booker – 9 rushes, 47 yards
- TEN – Jamie Harper – 8 rushes, 27 yards, TD

Top receivers

- MIN – Lorenzo Booker – 3 rec, 32 yards
- TEN – Yamon Figurs – 1 rec, 45 yards, TD

==== Week 2: at Seattle Seahawks ====
Preseason Week 2: Minnesota Vikings at Seattle Seahawks – Game summary

Quarter	1	2	3	4	Total
Vikings	7	6	0	7	20
Seahawks	0	0	0	7	7

at CenturyLink Field, Seattle, Washington

- Date: August 20
- Game time: 21:00
- Game weather: Sunny, 82 °F (28 °C)
- Game attendance: 65,599
- Referee: Clete Blakeman (34)
- TV announcers (KARE-11): Ari Wolfe, Mike Mayock and Randy Shaver
- Recap, Game Book

Game information

First quarter

- MIN – Marcus Sherels 64-yard interception return (Ryan Longwell kick), 5:35. Vikings 7–0.

Second quarter

- MIN – Ryan Longwell 36-yard field goal, 6:33. Vikings 10–0. Drive: 13 plays, 81 yards, 7:19.
- MIN – Ryan Longwell 34-yard field goal, 1:47. Vikings 13–0. Drive: 8 plays, 47 yards, 2:25.

Third quarter

- No scoring plays

Fourth quarter

- SEA – Anthony McCoy 3-yard pass from Charlie Whitehurst (Jeff Reed kick), 14:54. Vikings 13–7. Drive: 16 plays, 89 yards, 8:40.
- MIN – Tristan Davis 35-yard run (Ryan Longwell kick), 2:09. Vikings 20–7. Drive: 2 plays, 39 yards, 0:15.

Top passers

- MIN – Donovan McNabb – 6/8, 81 yards
- SEA – Charlie Whitehurst – 14/19, 97 yards, TD

Top rushers

- MIN – Lorenzo Booker – 7 rushes, 37 yards
- SEA – Josh Portis – 4 rushes, 46 yards

Top receivers

- MIN – Devin Aromashodu – 2 rec, 30 yards
- SEA – Dominique Byrd – 4 rec, 32 yards

==== Week 3: vs. Dallas Cowboys ====
Preseason Week 3: Dallas Cowboys at Minnesota Vikings – Game summary

Quarter	1	2	3	4	Total
Cowboys	3	14	3	3	23
Vikings	7	3	7	0	17

at Mall of America Field at Hubert H. Humphrey Metrodome, Minneapolis, Minnesota

- Date: August 27
- Game time: 19:00
- Game weather: None (domed stadium)
- Game attendance: 62,800
- Referee: John Parry (132)
- TV announcers (KARE-11): Ari Wolfe, Mike Mayock and Randy Shaver
- Recap, Game Book

Game information

First quarter

- MIN – Bernard Berrian 49-yard pass from Donovan McNabb (Ryan Longwell kick), 7:58. Vikings 7–0. Drive: 7 plays, 83 yards, 3:47.
- DAL – Dan Bailey 37-yard field goal, 2:52. Vikings 7–3. 'Drive:

Second quarter

- DAL – Alan Ball 20-yard return of blocked field goal (Shayne Graham kick), 14:36. Cowboys 10–7.
- DAL – Felix Jones 5-yard run (Dan Bailey kick), 6:53. Cowboys 17–7. Drive: 11 plays, 77 yards, 4:10.
- MIN – Ryan Longwell 44-yard field goal, 3:43. Cowboys 17–10. Drive: 7 plays, 16 yards, 3:10.

Third quarter

- DAL – Dan Bailey 38-yard field goal, 8:05. Cowboys 20–10. Drive: 7 plays, 38 yards, 3:11.
- MIN – Joe Webb 10-yard run (Ryan Longwell kick), 5:06. Cowboys 20–17. Drive: 7 plays, 81 yards, 2:59.

Fourth quarter

- DAL – Dan Bailey 41-yard field goal, 1:07. Cowboys 23–17. Drive: 8 plays, 58 yards, 2:49.

Top passers

- DAL – Tony Romo – 15/20, 141 yards
- MIN – Donovan McNabb – 12/18, 164 yards, TD

Top rushers

- DAL – DeMarco Murray – 7 rushes, 32 yards
- MIN – Adrian Peterson – 14 rushes, 81 yards

Top receivers

- DAL – Dez Bryant – 5 rec, 67 yards
- MIN – Bernard Berrian – 2 rec, 64 yards, TD

==== Week 4: vs. Houston Texans ====
Preseason Week 4: Houston Texans at Minnesota Vikings – Game summary

Quarter	1	2	3	4	Total
Texans	0	0	0	0	0
Vikings	0	7	7	14	28

at Mall of America Field at Hubert H. Humphrey Metrodome, Minneapolis, Minnesota

- Date: September 1
- Game time: 19:00
- Game weather: None (domed stadium)
- Game attendance: 62,148
- Referee: Walt Coleman (65)
- TV announcers (KARE-11): Ari Wolfe, Mike Mayock and Randy Shaver
- Recap, Game Book

Game information

First quarter

- No scoring plays

Second quarter

- MIN – Kyle Rudolph 5-yard pass from Christian Ponder (Ryan Longwell kick), 6:25. Vikings 7–0. Drive: 8 plays, 86 yards, 4:39.

Third quarter

- MIN – Alexander Robinson 4-yard run (Ryan Longwell kick), 10:19. Vikings 14–0. Drive: 6 plays, 42 yards, 2:16.

Fourth quarter

- MIN – Caleb King 7-yard run (Ryan Longwell kick), 13:47. Vikings 21–0. Drive: 11 plays, 59 yards, 5:53.
- MIN – Caleb King 2-yard run (Ryan Longwell kick), 0:47. Vikings 28–0. Drive: 11 plays, 54 yards, 6:26.

Top passers

- HOU – Matt Leinart – 13/16, 145 yards
- MIN – Christian Ponder – 10/16, 83 yards, TD

Top rushers

- HOU – Chris Ogbonnaya – 14 rushes, 62 yards
- MIN – Caleb King – 19 rushes, 62 yards, 2 TD

Top receivers

- HOU – Garrett Graham – 6 rec, 71 yards
- MIN – Jaymar Johnson – 2 rec, 28 yards

== Regular season ==
=== Schedule ===
Week	Date	Opponent	Result	Record	Game site	NFL.com recap
1	September 11	at San Diego Chargers	**L** 17–24	0–1	Qualcomm Stadium	Recap
2	September 18	**Tampa Bay Buccaneers**	**L** 20–24	0–2	Mall of America Field	Recap
3	September 25	**Detroit Lions**	**L** 23–26 (OT)	0–3	Mall of America Field	Recap
4	October 2	at Kansas City Chiefs	**L** 17–22	0–4	Arrowhead Stadium	Recap
5	October 9	**Arizona Cardinals**	**W** 34–10	1–4	Mall of America Field	Recap
6	October 16	at Chicago Bears	**L** 10–39	1–5	Soldier Field	Recap
7	October 23	**Green Bay Packers**	**L** 27–33	1–6	Mall of America Field	Recap
8	October 30	at Carolina Panthers	**W** 24–21	2–6	Bank of America Stadium	Recap
9	Bye					
10	November 14	at Green Bay Packers	**L** 7–45	2–7	Lambeau Field	Recap
11	November 20	**Oakland Raiders**	**L** 21–27	2–8	Mall of America Field	Recap
12	November 27	at Atlanta Falcons	**L** 14–24	2–9	Georgia Dome	Recap
13	December 4	**Denver Broncos**	**L** 32–35	2–10	Mall of America Field	Recap
14	December 11	at Detroit Lions	**L** 28–34	2–11	Ford Field	Recap
15	December 18	**New Orleans Saints**	**L** 20–42	2–12	Mall of America Field	Recap
16	December 24	at Washington Redskins	**W** 33–26	3–12	FedExField	Recap
17	January 1	**Chicago Bears**	**L** 13–17	3–13	Mall of America Field	Recap

LEGEND
Team names in bold indicate Vikings' home games.

=== Game summaries ===
==== Week 1: at San Diego Chargers ====
Week 1: Minnesota Vikings at San Diego Chargers – Game summary

Quarter	1	2	3	4	Total
Vikings	7	10	0	0	**17**
**Chargers**	7	0	7	10	**24**

at Qualcomm Stadium, San Diego, California

- Date: September 11
- Game time: 3:15 p.m. CDT
- Game weather: 74 °F (23 °C) Sunny
- Game attendance: 66,716
- Referee: Terry McAulay (77)
- TV announcers (Fox): Ron Pitts, Jim Mora, Jr. and Drea Avent
- Recap, Game Book

Game information

**First quarter**

- MIN – Percy Harvin 103-yard kickoff return (Ryan Longwell kick), 14:45. Vikings 7–0. **Drive: 0 plays, 0 yards, 0:15.**
- SD – Mike Tolbert 1-yard pass from Philip Rivers (Mike Scifres kick), 11:38. Tied 7–7. **Drive: 3 plays, 6 yards, 1:21.**

**Second quarter**

- MIN – Ryan Longwell 33-yard field goal, 12:56. Vikings 10–7. **Drive: 14 plays, 77 yards, 7:34.**
- MIN – Michael Jenkins 3-yard pass from Donovan McNabb (Ryan Longwell kick), 9:44. Vikings 17–7. **Drive: 3 plays, 51 yards, 1:28.**

**Third quarter**

- SD – Mike Tolbert 7-yard run (Mike Scifres kick), 10:43. Vikings 17–14. **Drive: 7 plays, 69 yards, 4:17.**

**Fourth quarter**

- SD – Mike Scifres 40-yard field goal, 10:05. Tied 17–17. **Drive: 9 plays, 46 yards, 4:45.**
- SD – Mike Tolbert 19-yard pass from Philip Rivers (Mike Scifres kick), 5:01. Chargers 24–17. **Drive: 6 plays, 64 yards, 3:10.**

**Top passers**

- MIN – Donovan McNabb – 7/15, 39 yards, TD
- SD – Philip Rivers – 33/48, 335 yards, 2 TD

**Top rushers**

- MIN – Adrian Peterson – 16 rushes, 98 yards
- SD – Ryan Mathews – 12 rushes, 45 yards

**Top receivers**

- MIN – Michael Jenkins – 3 rec, 26 yards, TD
- SD – Antonio Gates – 8 rec, 74 yards

==== Week 2: vs. Tampa Bay Buccaneers ====
Week 2: Tampa Bay Buccaneers at Minnesota Vikings – Game summary

Quarter	1	2	3	4	Total
**Buccaneers**	0	0	10	14	**24**
Vikings	7	10	0	3	**20**

at Mall of America Field at Hubert H. Humphrey Metrodome, Minneapolis, Minnesota

- Date: September 18
- Game time: 12:00 p.m. CDT
- Game weather: None (domed stadium)
- Game attendance: 62,461
- Referee: Jeff Triplette (42)
- TV announcers (Fox): Dick Stockton and John Lynch
- Recap, Game Book

Game information

**First quarter**

- MIN – Adrian Peterson 1-yard run (Ryan Longwell kick), 0:02. Vikings 7–0. **Drive: 12 plays, 90 yards, 6:41.**

**Second quarter**

- MIN – Ryan Longwell 22-yard field goal, 5:06. Vikings 10–0. **Drive: 14 plays, 72 yards, 7:45.**
- MIN – Adrian Peterson 9-yard run (Ryan Longwell kick), 0:52. Vikings 17–0. **Drive: 8 plays, 75 yards, 2:47.**

**Third quarter**

- TB – LeGarrette Blount 27-yard run (Connor Barth kick), 10:59. Vikings 17–7. **Drive: 2 plays, 44 yards, 0:40.**
- TB – Connor Barth 36-yard field goal, 0:29. Vikings 17–10. **Drive: 7 plays, 52 yards, 4:59.**

**Fourth quarter**

- MIN – Ryan Longwell 29-yard field goal, 9:41. Vikings 20–10. **Drive: 12 plays, 69 yards, 5:48.**
- TB – Arrelious Benn 25-yard pass from Josh Freeman (Connor Barth kick), 6:39. Vikings 20–17. **Drive: 8 plays, 80 yards, 3:02.**
- TB – LeGarrette Blount 4-yard run (Connor Barth kick), 0:31. Buccaneers 24–20. **Drive: 9 plays, 61 yards, 3:41.**

**Top passers**

- TB – Josh Freeman – 22/31, 243 yards, TD
- MIN – Donovan McNabb – 18/30, 228 yards

**Top rushers**

- TB – LeGarrette Blount – 13 rushes, 71 yards, 2 TD
- MIN – Adrian Peterson – 25 rushes, 120 yards, 2 TD

**Top receivers**

- TB – Preston Parker – 6 rec, 98 yards
- MIN – Percy Harvin – 7 rec, 76 yards

==== Week 3: vs. Detroit Lions ====
Week 3: Detroit Lions at Minnesota Vikings – Game summary

Quarter	1	2	3	4	OT	Total
**Lions**	0	0	10	13	3	**26**
Vikings	6	14	0	3	0	**23**

at Mall of America Field at Hubert H. Humphrey Metrodome, Minneapolis, Minnesota

- Date: September 25
- Game time: 12:00 p.m. CDT
- Game weather: None (domed stadium)
- Game attendance: 62,466
- Referee: Ron Winter (14)
- TV announcers (Fox): Dick Stockton and John Lynch
- Recap, Game Book

Game information

**First quarter**

- MIN – Ryan Longwell 33-yard field goal, 9:38. Vikings 3–0. **Drive: 12 plays, 63 yards, 5:22.**
- MIN – Ryan Longwell 41-yard field goal, 5:19. Vikings 6–0. **Drive: 8 plays, 30 yards, 2:36.**

**Second quarter**

- MIN – Adrian Peterson 6-yard run (Ryan Longwell kick), 6:01. Vikings 13–0. **Drive: 6 plays, 67 yards, 3:04.**
- MIN – Visanthe Shiancoe 8-yard pass from Donovan McNabb (Ryan Longwell kick), 0:09. Vikings 20–0. **Drive: 3 plays, 13 yards, 0:41.**

**Third quarter**

- DET – Calvin Johnson 32-yard pass from Matthew Stafford (Jason Hanson kick), 9:22. Vikings 20–7. **Drive: 4 plays, 52 yards, 1:39.**
- DET – Jason Hanson 28-yard field goal, 3:14. Vikings 20–10. **Drive: 9 plays, 41 yards, 4:58.**

**Fourth quarter**

- DET – Calvin Johnson 5-yard pass from Matthew Stafford (Jason Hanson kick), 14:55. Vikings 20–17. **Drive: 5 plays, 89 yards, 1:53.**
- DET – Jason Hanson 50-yard field goal, 5:20. Tied 20–20. **Drive: 12 plays, 51 yards, 6:13.**
- DET – Jason Hanson 40-yard field goal, 2:30. Lions 23–20. **Drive: 5 plays, 25 yards, 1:43.**
- MIN – Ryan Longwell 49-yard field goal, 1:11. Tied 23–23. **Drive: 9 plays, 52 yards, 1:19.**

**Overtime**

- DET – Jason Hanson 32-yard field goal, 13:01. Lions 26–23. **Drive: 5 plays, 59 yards, 1:59.**

**Top passers**

- DET – Matthew Stafford – 32/46, 378 yards, 2 TD
- MIN – Donovan McNabb – 22/36, 211 yards, TD

**Top rushers**

- DET – Jahvid Best – 12 rushes, 14 yards
- MIN – Adrian Peterson – 17 rushes, 78 yards, 1 TD

**Top receivers**

- DET – Brandon Pettigrew – 11 rec, 112 yards
- MIN – Michael Jenkins – 9 rec, 88 yards

==== Week 4: at Kansas City Chiefs ====
Week 4: Minnesota Vikings at Kansas City Chiefs – Game summary

Quarter	1	2	3	4	Total
Vikings	7	0	3	7	**17**
**Chiefs**	3	6	6	7	**22**

at Arrowhead Stadium, Kansas City, Missouri

- Date: October 2
- Game time: 12:00 p.m. CDT
- Game weather: 65 °F (18 °C) Sunny
- Game attendance: 72,931
- Referee: Bill Leavy (127)
- TV announcers (Fox): Gus Johnson, Charles Davis and Tim Brewster
- Recap, Game Book

Game information

**First quarter**

- KC – Ryan Succop 40-yard field goal, 7:16. Chiefs 3–0. **Drive: 12 plays, 21 yards, 5:56.**
- MIN – Devin Aromashodu 34-yard pass from Donovan McNabb (Ryan Longwell kick), 1:47. Vikings 7–3. **Drive: 9 plays, 80 yards, 5:29.**

**Second quarter**

- KC – Ryan Succop 24-yard field goal, 5:15. Vikings 7–6. **Drive: 7 plays, 59 yards, 2:32.**
- KC – Ryan Succop 51-yard field goal, 0:00. Chiefs 9–7. **Drive: 12 plays, 47 yards, 2:22.**

**Third quarter**

- MIN – Ryan Longwell 33-yard field goal, 9:15. Vikings 10–9. **Drive: 8 plays, 31 yards, 3:50.**
- KC – Ryan Succop 54-yard field goal, 5:18. Chiefs 12–10. **Drive: 9 plays, 57 yards, 3:57.**
- KC – Ryan Succop 22-yard field goal, 0:09. Chiefs 15–10. **Drive: 7 plays, 41 yards, 3:52.**

**Fourth quarter**

- KC – Dwayne Bowe 52-yard pass from Matt Cassel (Ryan Succop kick), 13:51. Chiefs 22–10. **Drive: 2 plays, 59 yards, 0:46.**
- MIN – Michael Jenkins 1-yard pass from Donovan McNabb (Ryan Longwell kick), 5:50. Chiefs 22–17. **Drive: 13 plays, 70 yards, 8:01.**

**Top passers**

- MIN – Donovan McNabb – 18/30, 202 yards, 2 TD
- KC – Matt Cassel – 18/29, 260 yards, TD

**Top rushers**

- MIN – Adrian Peterson – 23 rushes, 80 yards
- KC – Thomas Jones – 11 rushes, 37 yards

**Top receivers**

- MIN – Visanthe Shiancoe – 6 rec, 58 yards
- KC – Dwayne Bowe – 5 rec, 107 yards, TD

==== Week 5: vs. Arizona Cardinals ====
Week 5: Arizona Cardinals at Minnesota Vikings – Game summary

Quarter	1	2	3	4	Total
Cardinals	0	3	7	0	**10**
**Vikings**	28	0	3	3	**34**

at Mall of America Field at Hubert H. Humphrey Metrodome, Minneapolis, Minnesota

- Date: October 9
- Game time: 12:00 p.m. CDT
- Game weather: None (domed stadium)
- Game attendance: 62,479
- Referee: Scott Green (19)
- TV announcers (Fox): Chris Myers and Tim Ryan
- Recap, Game Book

Game information

**First quarter**

- MIN – Adrian Peterson 4-yard run (Ryan Longwell kick), 9:18. Vikings 7–0. **Drive: 4 plays, 18 yards, 1:35.**
- MIN – Adrian Peterson 24-yard run (Ryan Longwell kick), 8:55. Vikings 14–0. **Drive: 1 play, 24 yards, 0:07.**
- MIN – Donovan McNabb 4-yard run (Ryan Longwell kick), 6:25. Vikings 21–0. **Drive: 5 plays, 25 yards, 1:50.**
- MIN – Adrian Peterson 14-yard run (Ryan Longwell kick), 2:41. Vikings 28–0. **Drive: 4 plays, 73 yards, 2:01.**

**Second quarter**

- ARI – Jay Feely 51-yard field goal, 10:29. Vikings 28–3. **Drive: 7 plays, 20 yards, 3:25.**

**Third quarter**

- ARI – Beanie Wells 2-yard run (Jay Feely kick), 8:23. Vikings 28–10. **Drive: 9 plays, 59 yards, 3:41.**
- MIN – Ryan Longwell 26-yard field goal, 3:35. Vikings 31–10. **Drive: 8 plays, 82 yards, 4:48.**

**Fourth quarter**

- MIN – Ryan Longwell 53-yard field goal, 2:09. Vikings 34–10. **Drive: 7 plays, 12 yards, 4:33.**

**Top passers**

- ARI – Kevin Kolb – 21/42, 232 yards
- MIN – Donovan McNabb – 10/21, 169 yards

**Top rushers**

- ARI – Beanie Wells – 20 rushes, 60 yards, TD
- MIN – Adrian Peterson – 29 rushes, 122 yards, 3 TD

**Top receivers**

- ARI – Early Doucet – 8 rec, 92 yards
- MIN – Devin Aromashodu – 2 rec, 81 yards

==== Week 6: at Chicago Bears ====
Week 6: Minnesota Vikings at Chicago Bears – Game summary

Quarter	1	2	3	4	Total
Vikings	0	3	7	0	**10**
**Bears**	16	10	10	3	**39**

at Soldier Field, Chicago, Illinois

- Date: October 16
- Game time: 7:20 p.m. CDT
- Game weather: 56 °F (13 °C) Clear
- Game attendance: 62,322
- Referee: Walt Anderson (66)
- TV announcers (NBC): Al Michaels, Cris Collinsworth and Michele Tafoya
- Recap, Game Book

Game information

**First quarter**

- CHI – Devin Hester 48-yard pass from Jay Cutler (Robbie Gould kick), 12:17. Bears 7–0. **Drive: 3 plays, 68 yards, 1:13.**
- CHI – Donovan McNabb sacked in the end zone by Stephen Paea for a safety, 6:52. Bears 9–0.
- CHI – Marion Barber 3-yard run (Robbie Gould kick), 3:39. Bears 16–0. **Drive: 6 plays, 56 yards, 3:13.**

**Second quarter**

- MIN – Ryan Longwell 37-yard field goal, 12:37. Bears 16–3. **Drive: 12 plays, 62 yards, 6:02.**
- CHI – Dane Sanzenbacher 13-yard pass from Jay Cutler (Robbie Gould kick), 6:41. Bears 23–3. **Drive: 4 plays, 33 yards, 1:23.**
- CHI – Robbie Gould 51-yard field goal, 0:28. Bears 26–3. **Drive: 7 plays, 39 yards, 1:27.**

**Third quarter**

- MIN – Adrian Peterson 4-yard run (Ryan Longwell kick), 10:23. Bears 26–10. **Drive: 6 plays, 44 yards, 2:24.**
- CHI – Devin Hester 98-yard kickoff return (Robbie Gould kick), 10:09. Bears 33–10. **Drive: 0 plays, 0 yards, 0:14.**
- CHI – Robbie Gould 26-yard field goal, 5:44. Bears 36–10. **Drive: 7 plays, 30 yards, 2:35.**

**Fourth quarter**

- CHI – Robbie Gould 22-yard field goal, 14:50. Bears 39–10. **Drive: 8 plays, 39 yards, 4:13.**

**Top passers**

- MIN – Donovan McNabb – 19/24, 177 yards
- CHI – Jay Cutler – 21/31, 267 yards, 2 TD

**Top rushers**

- MIN – Adrian Peterson – 12 rushes, 39 yards, TD
- CHI – Matt Forté – 17 rushes, 87 yards

**Top receivers**

- MIN – Percy Harvin – 7 rec, 78 yards
- CHI – Devin Hester – 5 rec, 91 yards, TD

==== Week 7: vs. Green Bay Packers ====
Week 7: Green Bay Packers at Minnesota Vikings – Game summary

Quarter	1	2	3	4	Total
**Packers**	7	6	20	0	**33**
Vikings	7	10	0	10	**27**

at Mall of America Field at Hubert H. Humphrey Metrodome, Minneapolis, Minnesota

- Date: October 23
- Game time: 3:15 p.m. CDT
- Game weather: None (domed stadium)
- Game attendance: 63,946
- Referee: Pete Morelli (135)
- TV announcers (Fox): Thom Brennaman, Troy Aikman and Pam Oliver
- Recap, Game Book

Game information

**First quarter**

- MIN – Visanthe Shiancoe 2-yard pass from Christian Ponder (Ryan Longwell kick), 13:58. Vikings 7–0. **Drive: 3 plays, 73 yards, 1:02.**
- GB – John Kuhn 2-yard pass from Aaron Rodgers (Mason Crosby kick), 8:34. Tied 7–7. **Drive: 9 plays, 91 yards, 5:24.**

**Second quarter**

- MIN – Adrian Peterson 1-yard run (Ryan Longwell kick), 11:43. Vikings 14–7. **Drive: 7 plays, 50 yards, 3:39.**
- GB – Mason Crosby 39-yard field goal, 4:55. Vikings 14–10. **Drive: 11 plays, 59 yards, 6:48.**
- MIN – Ryan Longwell 52-yard field goal, 0:55. Vikings 17–10. **Drive: 11 plays, 46 yards, 4:00.**
- GB – Mason Crosby 45-yard field goal, 0:00. Vikings 17–13. **Drive: 7 plays, 53 yards, 0:55.**

**Third quarter**

- GB – Greg Jennings 79-yard pass from Aaron Rodgers (Mason Crosby kick), 14:09. Packers 20–17. **Drive: 2 plays, 80 yards, 0:51.**
- GB – Jermichael Finley 2-yard pass from Aaron Rodgers (Mason Crosby kick), 10:29. Packers 27–17. **Drive: 4 plays, 32 yards, 2:19.**
- GB – Mason Crosby 24-yard field goal, 3:18. Packers 30–17. **Drive: 8 plays, 39 yards, 4:44.**
- GB – Mason Crosby 58-yard field goal, 0:18. Packers 33–17. **Drive: 4 plays, −5 yards, 1:59.**

**Fourth quarter**

- MIN – Ryan Longwell 46-yard field goal, 13:48. Packers 33–20. **Drive: 5 plays, 52 yards, 1:30.**
- MIN – Michael Jenkins 24-yard pass from Christian Ponder (Ryan Longwell kick), 7:49. Packers 33–27. **Drive: 10 plays, 93 yards, 4:41.**

**Top passers**

- GB – Aaron Rodgers – 24/30, 335 yards, 3 TD
- MIN – Christian Ponder – 13/32, 219 yards, 2 TD

**Top rushers**

- GB – James Starks – 13 rushes, 75 yards
- MIN – Adrian Peterson – 24 rushes, 175 yards, TD

**Top receivers**

- GB – Greg Jennings – 7 rec, 147 yards, TD
- MIN – Michael Jenkins – 3 rec, 111 yards, TD

==== Week 8: at Carolina Panthers ====
Week 8: Minnesota Vikings at Carolina Panthers – Game summary

Quarter	1	2	3	4	Total
**Vikings**	7	7	7	3	**24**
Panthers	0	14	7	0	**21**

at Bank of America Stadium, Charlotte, North Carolina

- Date: October 30
- Game time: 12:00 p.m. CDT
- Game weather: 54 °F (12 °C) Sunny
- Game attendance: 72,095
- Referee: Ed Hochuli (85)
- TV announcers (Fox): Kenny Albert, Daryl Johnston and Tony Siragusa
- Recap, Game Book

Game information

**First quarter**

- MIN – Percy Harvin 10-yard run (Ryan Longwell kick), 12:34. Vikings 7–0. **Drive: 2 plays, 16 yards, 0:39.**

**Second quarter**

- CAR – Jeremy Shockey 1-yard pass from Cam Newton (Olindo Mare kick), 13:22. Tied 7–7. **Drive: 9 plays, 90 yards, 4:27.**
- CAR – Greg Olsen 39-yard pass from Cam Newton (Olindo Mare kick), 10:18. Panthers 14–7. **Drive: 5 plays, 49 yards, 1:41.**
- MIN – Adrian Peterson 19-yard pass from Christian Ponder (Ryan Longwell kick), 0:42. Tied 14–14. **Drive: 2 plays, 39 yards, 0:21.**

**Third quarter**

- CAR – Steve Smith 22-yard pass from Cam Newton (Olindo Mare kick), 11:07. Panthers 21–14. **Drive: 9 plays, 80 yards, 3:53.**
- MIN – Adrian Peterson 9-yard run (Ryan Longwell kick), 1:58. Tied 21–21. **Drive: 12 plays, 90 yards, 5:41.**

**Fourth quarter**

- MIN – Ryan Longwell 31-yard field goal, 2:43. Vikings 24–21. **Drive: 13 plays, 72 yards, 7:10.**

**Top passers**

- MIN – Christian Ponder – 18/28, 236 yards, TD
- CAR – Cam Newton – 22/35, 290 yards, 3 TD

**Top rushers**

- MIN – Adrian Peterson – 21 rushes, 86 yards, TD
- CAR – Cam Newton – 6 rushes, 53 yards

**Top receivers**

- MIN – Adrian Peterson – 5 rec, 76 yards, TD
- CAR – Steve Smith – 7 rec, 100 yards, TD

==== Week 10: at Green Bay Packers ====
Week 10: Minnesota Vikings at Green Bay Packers – Game summary

Quarter	1	2	3	4	Total
Vikings	0	0	7	0	**7**
**Packers**	14	3	14	14	**45**

at Lambeau Field, Green Bay, Wisconsin

- Date: November 14
- Game time: 7:30 p.m. CST
- Game weather: 47 °F (8 °C)
- Game attendance: 70,519
- Referee: Mike Carey (94)
- TV announcers (ESPN): Mike Tirico, Ron Jaworski, Jon Gruden and Rachel Nichols
- Recap, Game Book

Game information

**First quarter**

- GB – Randall Cobb 80-yard punt return (Mason Crosby kick), 13:42. Packers 7–0.
- GB – Greg Jennings 24-yard pass from Aaron Rodgers (Mason Crosby kick), 5:02. Packers 14–0. **Drive: 11 plays, 70 yards, 4:53.**

**Second quarter**

- GB – Mason Crosby 25-yard field goal, 12:04. Packers 17–0. **Drive: 9 plays, 51 yards, 4:10.**

**Third quarter**

- GB – Jordy Nelson 17-yard pass from Aaron Rodgers (Mason Crosby kick), 10:45. Packers 24–0. **Drive: 8 plays, 69 yards, 4:15.**
- MIN – Adrian Peterson 3-yard run (Ryan Longwell kick), 8:41. Packers 24–7. **Drive: 2 plays, 14 yards, 0:29.**
- GB – John Kuhn 9-yard pass from Aaron Rodgers (Mason Crosby kick), 6:21. Packers 31–7. **Drive: 5 plays, 50 yards, 2:20**

**Fourth quarter**

- GB – Jordy Nelson 4-yard pass from Aaron Rodgers (Mason Crosby kick), 10:59. Packers 38–7. **Drive: 11 plays, 59 yards, 5:30.**
- GB – Matt Flynn 3-yard run (Mason Crosby kick), 4:27. Packers 45–7. **Drive: 9 plays, 66 yards, 6:03.**

**Top passers**

- MIN – Christian Ponder – 16/34, 190 yards
- GB – Aaron Rodgers – 23/30, 250 yards, 4 TD

**Top rushers**

- MIN – Adrian Peterson – 14 rushes, 51 yards, TD
- GB – James Starks – 13 rushes, 63 yards

**Top receivers**

- MIN – Percy Harvin – 6 rec, 52 yards
- GB – Jermichael Finley – 3 rec, 67 yards

As of 2025, this is the Vikings' most lopsided loss to the Packers.

==== Week 11: vs. Oakland Raiders ====
Week 11: Oakland Raiders at Minnesota Vikings – Game summary

Quarter	1	2	3	4	Total
**Raiders**	3	21	3	0	**27**
Vikings	7	0	0	14	**21**

at Mall of America Field at Hubert H. Humphrey Metrodome, Minneapolis, Minnesota

- Date: November 20
- Game time: 12:00 p.m. CST
- Game weather: None (domed stadium)
- Game attendance: 62,748
- Referee: Jerome Boger (23)
- TV announcers (CBS): Kevin Harlan and Solomon Wilcots
- Recap, Game Book

Game information

**First quarter**

- MIN – Adrian Peterson 12-yard run (Ryan Longwell kick), 5:17. Vikings 7–0. **Drive: 12 plays, 77 yards, 4:24.**
- OAK – Sebastian Janikowski 29-yard field goal, 0:57. Vikings 7–3. **Drive: 9 plays, 44 yards, 4:20.**

**Second quarter**

- OAK – Chaz Schilens 11-yard pass from Carson Palmer (Sebastian Janikowski kick), 9:10. Raiders 10–7. **Drive: 7 plays, 53 yards, 3:50.**
- OAK – Michael Bush 2-yard run (Sebastian Janikowski kick), 1:20. Raiders 17–7. **Drive: 8 plays, 57 yards, 3:22.**
- OAK – Carson Palmer 1-yard run (Sebastian Janikowski kick), 0:08. Raiders 24–7. **Drive: 4 plays, 16 yards, 1:06.**

**Third quarter**

- OAK – Sebastian Janikowski 26-yard field goal, 0:51. Raiders 27–7. **Drive: 7 plays, 16 yards, 3:27.**

**Fourth quarter**

- MIN – Percy Harvin 26-yard pass from Christian Ponder (Ryan Longwell kick), 14:52. Raiders 27–14. **Drive: 4 plays, 72 yards, 0:59.**
- MIN – Kyle Rudolph 1-yard pass from Christian Ponder (Ryan Longwell kick), 5:08. Raiders 27–21. **Drive: 2 plays, 38 yards, 0:50.**

**Top passers**

- OAK – Carson Palmer – 17/23, 164 yards, TD
- MIN – Christian Ponder – 19/33, 211 yards, 2 TD

**Top rushers**

- OAK – Michael Bush – 30 rushes, 109 yards, TD
- MIN – Christian Ponder – 5 rushes, 71 yards

**Top receivers**

- OAK – Darrius Heyward-Bey – 4 rec, 43 yards
- MIN – Percy Harvin – 6 rec, 73 yards, TD

==== Week 12: at Atlanta Falcons ====
Week 12: Minnesota Vikings at Atlanta Falcons – Game summary

Quarter	1	2	3	4	Total
Vikings	0	0	7	7	**14**
**Falcons**	7	10	0	7	**24**

at Georgia Dome, Atlanta, Georgia

- Date: November 27
- Game time: 12:00 p.m. CST
- Game weather: None (domed stadium)
- Game attendance: 68,115
- Referee: Alberto Riveron (57)
- TV announcers (Fox): Thom Brennaman, Brian Billick and Laura Okmin
- Recap, Game Book

Game information

**First quarter**

- ATL – Harry Douglas 27-yard pass from Matt Ryan (Matt Bryant kick), 6:08. Falcons 7–0. **Drive: 9 plays, 80 yards, 5:39.**

**Second quarter**

- ATL – Roddy White 6-yard pass from Matt Ryan (Matt Bryant kick), 4:04. Falcons 14–0. **Drive: 10 plays, 68 yards, 6:01.**
- ATL – Matt Bryant 37-yard field goal, 0:37. Falcons 17–0. **Drive: 6 plays, 17 yards, 1:23.**

**Third quarter**

- MIN – Toby Gerhart 1-yard run (Ryan Longwell kick), 3:58. Falcons 17–7. **Drive: 14 plays, 80 yards, 7:53.**

**Fourth quarter**

- MIN – Percy Harvin 39-yard pass from Christian Ponder (Ryan Longwell kick), 13:13. Falcons 17–14. **Drive: 4 plays, 36 yards, 0:52.**
- ATL – Michael Palmer 3-yard pass from Matt Ryan (Matt Bryant kick), 6:40. Falcons 24–14. **Drive: 9 plays, 73 yards, 3:59.**

**Top passers**

- MIN – Christian Ponder – 17/25, 186 yards, TD
- ATL – Matt Ryan – 27/34, 262 yards, 3 TD

**Top rushers**

- MIN – Toby Gerhart – 17 rushes, 44 yards, TD
- ATL – Michael Turner – 19 rushes, 60 yards

**Top receivers**

- MIN – Percy Harvin – 8 rec, 95 yards, TD
- ATL – Roddy White – 10 rec, 120 yards, TD

==== Week 13: vs. Denver Broncos ====
Week 13: Denver Broncos at Minnesota Vikings – Game summary

Quarter	1	2	3	4	Total
**Broncos**	7	0	14	14	**35**
Vikings	5	10	7	10	**32**

at Mall of America Field at Hubert H. Humphrey Metrodome, Minneapolis, Minnesota

- Date: December 4
- Game time: 12:00 p.m. CST
- Game weather: None (domed stadium)
- Game attendance: 62,939
- Referee: Terry McAulay (77)
- TV announcers (Fox): Thom Brennaman, Brian Billick and Laura Okmin
- Recap, Game Book

Game information

**First quarter**

- MIN – Willis McGahee tackled in end zone by Jared Allen for a safety, 12:39. Vikings 2–0.
- DEN – Mario Haggan 16-yard interception return (Matt Prater kick), 5:42. Broncos 7–2.
- MIN – Ryan Longwell 40-yard field goal, 1:24. Broncos 7–5. **Drive: 6 plays, 14 yards, 2:21.**

**Second quarter**

- MIN – Kyle Rudolph 19-yard pass from Christian Ponder (Ryan Longwell kick), 3:33. Vikings 12–7. **Drive: 12 plays, 96 yards, 5:57.**
- MIN – Ryan Longwell 25-yard field goal, 0:00. Vikings 15–7. **Drive: 4 plays, 15 yards, 0:39.**

**Third quarter**

- DEN – Demaryius Thomas 21-yard pass from Tim Tebow (Matt Prater kick), 11:18. Vikings 15–14. **Drive: 9 plays, 78 yards, 3:42.**
- MIN – Percy Harvin 52-yard pass from Christian Ponder (Ryan Longwell kick), 3:12. Vikings 22–14. **Drive: 6 plays, 85 yards, 3:23.**
- DEN – Demaryius Thomas 41-yard pass from Tim Tebow (Matt Prater kick), 2:48. Vikings 22–21. **Drive: 1 play, 41 yards, 0:24.**

**Fourth quarter**

- MIN – Percy Harvin 48-yard pass from Christian Ponder (Ryan Longwell kick), 9:41. Vikings 29–21. **Drive: 4 plays, 77 yards, 1:36.**
- DEN – Willis McGahee 24-yard run (Tim Tebow run), 8:52. Tied 29–29. **Drive: 2 plays, 66 yards, 0:49.**
- MIN – Ryan Longwell 39-yard field goal, 3:06. Vikings 32–29. **Drive: 13 plays, 59 yards, 5:46.**
- DEN – Matt Prater 46-yard field goal, 1:33. Tied 32–32. **Drive: 7 plays, 52 yards, 1:33.**
- DEN – Matt Prater 23-yard field goal, 0:00. Broncos 35–32. **Drive: 6 plays, 10 yards, 1:25.**

**Top passers**

- DEN – Tim Tebow – 10/15, 202 yards, 2 TD
- MIN – Christian Ponder – 29/47, 381 yards, 3 TD

**Top rushers**

- DEN – Willis McGahee – 20 rushes, 111 yards, TD
- MIN – Toby Gerhart – 21 rushes, 91 yards

**Top receivers**

- DEN – Demaryius Thomas – 4 rec, 144 yards, 2 TD
- MIN – Percy Harvin – 8 rec, 156 yards, 2 TD

This game was notable for being the first NFL on Fox regular season interconference game. It was originally meant to be on CBS. However, because of the Colts-Patriots matchup was flexed out of Sunday Night Football for Lions-Saints, FOX got the rights to air this game since CBS wasn't able to air due to not having enough members to air 7 1PM games involving AFC road teams.

==== Week 14: at Detroit Lions ====
Week 14: Minnesota Vikings at Detroit Lions – Game summary

Quarter	1	2	3	4	Total
Vikings	7	7	7	7	**28**
**Lions**	21	10	0	3	**34**

at Ford Field, Detroit, Michigan

- Date: December 11
- Game time: 12:00 p.m. CST
- Game weather: None (domed stadium)
- Game attendance: 63,988
- Referee: John Parry (132)
- TV announcers (Fox): Thom Brennaman, Brian Billick and Laura Okmin
- Recap, Game Book

Game information

**First quarter**

- DET – Stephen Tulloch fumble recovery in end zone (Jason Hanson kick), 12:56. Lions 7–0.
- DET – Titus Young 57-yard pass from Matthew Stafford (Jason Hanson kick), 9:45. Lions 14–0. **Drive: 3 plays, 53 yards, 1:43.**
- DET – Brandon Pettigrew 12-yard pass from Matthew Stafford (Jason Hanson kick), 5:54. Lions 21–0. **Drive: 4 plays, 34 yards, 1:52.**
- MIN – Visanthe Shiancoe 7-yard pass from Christian Ponder (Ryan Longwell kick), 1:51. Lions 21–7. **Drive: 10 plays, 80 yards, 4:03.**

**Second quarter**

- DET – Alphonso Smith 30-yard interception return (Jason Hanson kick), 12:33. Lions 28–7.
- MIN – Percy Harvin 6-yard pass from Christian Ponder (Ryan Longwell kick), 7:36. Lions 28–14. **Drive: 10 plays, 60 yards, 4:57.**
- DET – Jason Hanson 30-yard field goal, 1:05. Lions 31–14. **Drive: 4 plays, 4 yards, 1:15.**

**Third quarter**

- MIN – Joe Webb 65-yard run (Ryan Longwell kick), 4:21. Lions 31–21. **Drive: 9 plays, 88 yards, 3:41.**

**Fourth quarter**

- DET – Jason Hanson 26-yard field goal, 12:17. Lions 34–21. **Drive: 15 plays, 83 yards, 7:04.**
- MIN – Toby Gerhart 2-yard pass from Joe Webb (Ryan Longwell kick), 7:54. Lions 34–28. **Drive: 12 plays, 60 yards, 4:23.**

**Top passers**

- MIN – Christian Ponder – 11/21, 115 yards, 2 TD
- DET – Matthew Stafford – 20/29, 227 yards, 2 TD

**Top rushers**

- MIN – Joe Webb – 7 rushes, 109 yards, TD
- DET – Keiland Williams – 12 rushes, 43 yards

**Top receivers**

- MIN – Percy Harvin – 10 rec, 69 yards, TD
- DET – Titus Young – 4 rec, 87 yards, TD

This marked the first time the Vikings were swept by the Lions since 1997.

==== Week 15: vs. New Orleans Saints ====
Week 15: New Orleans Saints at Minnesota Vikings – Game summary

Quarter	1	2	3	4	Total
**Saints**	7	14	14	7	**42**
Vikings	3	10	0	7	**20**

at Mall of America Field at Hubert H. Humphrey Metrodome, Minneapolis, Minnesota

- Date: December 18
- Game time: 12:00 p.m. CST
- Game weather: None (domed stadium)
- Game attendance: 62,623
- Referee: Walt Anderson (66)
- TV announcers (Fox): Dick Stockton, John Lynch and Jennifer Hale
- Recap, Game Book

Game information

**First quarter**

- MIN – Ryan Longwell 44-yard field goal, 12:20. Vikings 3–0. **Drive: 4 plays, 0 yards, 1:20.**
- NO – Lance Moore 5-yard pass from Drew Brees (John Kasay kick), 2:51. Saints 7–3. **Drive: 10 plays, 84 yards, 5:36.**

**Second quarter**

- MIN – Ryan Longwell 49-yard field goal, 13:13. Saints 7–6. **Drive: 4 plays, −10 yards, 1:09.**
- NO – Jimmy Graham 1-yard pass from Drew Brees (John Kasay kick), 10:04. Saints 14–6. **Drive: 5 plays, 80 yards, 3:09.**
- MIN – Toby Gerhart 10-yard pass from Christian Ponder (Ryan Longwell kick), 6:59. Saints 14–13. **Drive: 6 plays, 61 yards, 3:05.**
- NO – Darren Sproles 13-yard pass from Drew Brees (John Kasay kick), 1:33. Saints 21–13. **Drive: 13 plays, 76 yards, 5:26.**

**Third quarter**

- NO – John Gilmore 2-yard pass from Drew Brees (John Kasay kick), 12:15. Saints 28–13. **Drive: 4 plays, 44 yards, 1:44.**
- NO – Lance Moore 47-yard pass from Drew Brees (John Kasay kick), 10:18. Saints 35–13. **Drive: 3 plays, 53 yards, 0:56.**

**Fourth quarter**

- NO – Pierre Thomas 1-yard run (John Kasay kick), 12:50. Saints 42–13. **Drive: 19 plays, 87 yards, 10:36.**
- MIN – Toby Gerhart 16-yard pass from Christian Ponder (Ryan Longwell kick), 5:12. Saints 42–20. **Drive: 6 plays, 60 yards, 2:13.**

**Top passers**

- NO – Drew Brees – 32/40, 412 yards, 5 TD
- MIN – Christian Ponder – 14/31, 120 yards, 2 TD

**Top rushers**

- NO – Chris Ivory – 18 rushes, 74 yards
- MIN – Adrian Peterson – 10 rushes, 60 yards

**Top receivers**

- NO – Marques Colston – 8 rec, 91 yards
- MIN – Toby Gerhart – 4 rec, 46 yards, 2 TD

==== Week 16: at Washington Redskins ====
Week 16: Minnesota Vikings at Washington Redskins – Game summary

Quarter	1	2	3	4	Total
**Vikings**	3	7	13	10	**33**
Redskins	0	10	10	6	**26**

at FedExField, Landover, Maryland

- Date: December 24
- Game time: 12:00 p.m. CST
- Game weather: 45 °F (7 °C) Sunny
- Game attendance: 68,370
- Referee: Tony Corrente (99)
- TV announcers (Fox): Chris Myers, Tim Ryan and Jaime Maggio
- Recap, Game Book

Game information

**First quarter**

- MIN – Ryan Longwell 36-yard field goal, 7:11. Vikings 3–0. **Drive: 4 plays, 2 yards, 1:23.**

**Second quarter**

- MIN – Adrian Peterson 1-yard run (Ryan Longwell kick), 14:56. Vikings 10–0. **Drive: 13 plays, 68 yards, 5:52.**
- WAS – Donté Stallworth 5-yard pass from Rex Grossman (Graham Gano kick), 10:46. Vikings 10–7. **Drive: 7 plays, 60 yards, 4:10.**
- WAS – Graham Gano 26-yard field goal, 1:02. Tied 10–10. **Drive: 11 plays, 53 yards, 4:34.**

**Third quarter**

- WAS – Graham Gano 53-yard field goal, 10:40. Redskins 13–10. **Drive: 6 plays, 4 yards, 2:39.**
- MIN – Joe Webb 9-yard run (Ryan Longwell kick), 9:23. Vikings 17–13. **Drive: 3 plays, 75 yards, 1:17.**
- WAS – Jabar Gaffney 4-yard pass from Rex Grossman (Graham Gano kick), 5:57. Redskins 20–17. **Drive: 7 plays, 43 yards, 3:26.**
- MIN – Kyle Rudolph 17-yard pass from Joe Webb (kick missed), 2:41. Vikings 23–20. **Drive: 6 plays, 73 yards, 3:16.**

**Fourth quarter**

- WAS – Graham Gano 25-yard field goal, 12:41. Tied 23–23. **Drive: 10 plays, 79 yards, 5:00.**
- MIN – Percy Harvin 8-yard pass from Joe Webb (Ryan Longwell kick), 10:06. Vikings 30–23. **Drive: 6 plays, 72 yards, 2:35.**
- MIN – Ryan Longwell 23-yard field goal, 4:05. Vikings 33–23. **Drive: 6 plays, 19 yards, 3:27.**
- WAS – Graham Gano 47-yard field goal, 1:25. Vikings 33–26. **Drive: 10 plays, 52 yards, 2:40.**

**Top passers**

- MIN – Joe Webb – 4/5, 84 yards, 2 TD
- WAS – Rex Grossman – 26/41, 284 yards, 2 TD

**Top rushers**

- MIN – Toby Gerhart – 11 rushes, 109 yards
- WAS – Evan Royster – 19 rushes, 132 yards

**Top receivers**

- MIN – Percy Harvin – 5 rec, 65 yards, TD
- WAS – Jabar Gaffney – 6 rec, 77 yards, TD

==== Week 17: vs. Chicago Bears ====
Week 17: Chicago Bears at Minnesota Vikings – Game summary

Quarter	1	2	3	4	Total
**Bears**	0	14	0	3	**17**
Vikings	10	3	0	0	**13**

at Mall of America Field at Hubert H. Humphrey Metrodome, Minneapolis, Minnesota

- Date: January 1
- Game time: 12:00 p.m. CST
- Game weather: None (domed stadium)
- Game attendance: 62,867
- Referee: Mike Carey (94)
- TV announcers (Fox): Kenny Albert, Daryl Johnston and Tony Siragusa
- Recap, Game Book

Game information

**First quarter**

- MIN – Ryan Longwell 26-yard field goal, 8:53. Vikings 3–0. **Drive: 8 plays, 41 yards, 3:38.**
- MIN – Percy Harvin 5-yard run (Ryan Longwell kick), 3:42. Vikings 10–0. **Drive: 3 plays, 18 yards, 0:43.**

**Second quarter**

- CHI – Roy Williams 22-yard pass from Josh McCown (Robbie Gould kick), 14:19. Vikings 10–7. **Drive: 8 plays, 90 yards, 4:23.**
- CHI – Charles Tillman 22-yard interception return (Robbie Gould kick), 13:37. Bears 14–10.
- MIN – Ryan Longwell 26-yard field goal, 0:55. Bears 14–13. **Drive: 9 plays, 71 yards, 3:17.**

**Third quarter**

- No scoring plays

**Fourth quarter**

- CHI – Robbie Gould 27-yard field goal, 10:19. Bears 17–13. **Drive: 15 plays, 65 yards, 7:19.**

**Top passers**

- CHI – Josh McCown – 15/25, 160 yards, TD
- MIN – Joe Webb – 17/32, 200 yards

**Top rushers**

- CHI – Kahlil Bell – 17 rushes, 54 yards
- MIN – Toby Gerhart – 15 rushes, 67 yards

**Top receivers**

- CHI – Roy Williams – 4 rec, 60 yards, TD
- MIN – Percy Harvin – 10 rec, 115 yards

With the loss, the Vikings clinched their worst record since 1984.

=== Standings ===
NFC North
	W	L	T	PCT	DIV	CONF	PF	PA	STK
^{(1)} Green Bay Packers	15	1	0	.938	6–0	12–0	560	359	W2
^{(6)} Detroit Lions	10	6	0	.625	3–3	6–6	474	387	L1
Chicago Bears	8	8	0	.500	3–3	7–5	353	341	W1
Minnesota Vikings	3	13	0	.188	0–6	3–9	340	449	L1

== Statistics ==
=== Team leaders ===
Category	Player(s)	Value
Passing yards	Christian Ponder	1,853
Passing touchdowns	Christian Ponder	13
Rushing yards	Adrian Peterson	970
Rushing touchdowns	Adrian Peterson	12
Receiving yards	Percy Harvin	967
Receiving touchdowns	Percy Harvin	6
Points	Ryan Longwell	104
Kickoff return yards	Percy Harvin	520
Punt return yards	Marcus Sherels	277
Tackles	Chad Greenway	154
Sacks	Jared Allen	22.0 *
Interceptions	Jamarca Sanford	2
Forced fumbles	Jared Allen	4

- *Led the league and a new Vikings single-season record.

=== League rankings ===
Category	Total yards	Yards per game	NFL rank (out of 32)
Passing offense	2,957	184.8	28th
Rushing offense	2,318	144.9	4th
Total offense	5,275	329.7	18th
Passing defense	4,019	251.2	26th
Rushing defense	1,712	107.0	11th
Total defense	5,731	358.2	12th
