= 2010 Arkansas Razorbacks football team =

American college football season

2010 Arkansas Razorbacks football

Sugar Bowl, L 26–31 vs. Ohio State
- Conference: Southeastern Conference
- Western Division

Ranking
- Coaches: No. 12
- AP: No. 12
- Record: 10–3 (6–2 SEC)
- Head coach: Bobby Petrino (3rd season)
- Offensive coordinator: Garrick McGee (1st season)
- Offensive scheme: Multiple
- Defensive coordinator: Willy Robinson (3rd season)
- Base defense: 4–3
- Captains: Jake Bequette; Ramon Broadway; Jerry Franklin; DeMarcus Love; Ryan Mallett; D. J. Williams
- Home stadium: Donald W. Reynolds Razorback Stadium; War Memorial Stadium

2010 Southeastern Conference football standings
	Conf.			Overall
Team	W		L	W		L
Eastern Division
No. 22 South Carolina x	5	–	3	9	–	5
Florida	4	–	4	8	–	5
Georgia	3	–	5	6	–	7
Tennessee	3	–	5	6	–	7
Kentucky	2	–	6	6	–	7
Vanderbilt	1	–	7	2	–	10
Western Division
No. 1 Auburn x$#	8	–	0	14	–	0
No. 12 Arkansas %	6	–	2	10	–	3
No. 8 LSU	6	–	2	11	–	2
No. 10 Alabama	5	–	3	10	–	3
No. 15 Mississippi State	4	–	4	9	–	4
Ole Miss*	1	–	7	4	–	8
Championship: Auburn 56, South Carolina 17
# – BCS National Champion; $ – BCS representative as conference champion; % – BCS at-large representative; x – Division champion/co-champions; * Ole Miss vacated all wins due to NCAA violations.; Rankings from AP Poll

The 2010 Arkansas Razorbacks football team represented the University of Arkansas as a member of the Southeastern Conference (SEC) during the 2010 NCAA Division I FBS football season. Led by third-year head coach Bobby Petrino, the Razorbacks compiled an overall record of 10–3 with a mark of 6–2 in conference play, tying for second place in the SEC's Western Division. Arkansas earned a berth in the Sugar Bowl, the program's first appearance in a Bowl Championship Series (BCS) game. The Razorbacks lost Sugar Bowl to Ohio State. The team played five home games at Donald W. Reynolds Razorback Stadium in Fayetteville, Arkansas and two home games at War Memorial Stadium in Little Rock, Arkansas.

== Schedule ==
Date	Time	Opponent	Rank	Site	TV	Result	Attendance	Source
September 4	6:00 p.m.	Tennessee Tech*	No. 17	Donald W. Reynolds Razorback Stadium; Fayetteville, AR	PPV	W 44–3	69,596	
September 11	6:00 p.m.	Louisiana–Monroe*	No. 14	War Memorial Stadium; Little Rock, AR	SECRN	W 31–7	55,705	
September 18	11:00 a.m.	at Georgia	No. 12	Sanford Stadium; Athens, GA	ESPN	W 31–24	92,746	
September 25	2:30 p.m.	No. 1 Alabama	No. 10	Donald W. Reynolds Razorback Stadium; Fayetteville, AR	CBS	L 20–24	76,808‡	
October 9	2:30 p.m.	vs. Texas A&M*	No. 11	Cowboys Stadium; Arlington, TX (rivalry)	ABC	W 24–17	65,622	
October 16	2:30 p.m.	at No. 7 Auburn	No. 12	Jordan–Hare Stadium; Auburn, AL	CBS	L 43–65	87,451	
October 23	11:21 a.m.	Ole Miss	No. 21	Donald W. Reynolds Razorback Stadium; Fayetteville, AR (rivalry)	SECN	W 38–24	73,619	
October 30	7:00 p.m.	Vanderbilt^{†}	No. 19	Donald W. Reynolds Razorback Stadium; Fayetteville, AR	SECRN	W 49–14	70,430	
November 6	6:00 p.m.	at No. 18 South Carolina	No. 17	Williams–Brice Stadium; Columbia, SC	ESPN	W 41–20	75,136	
November 13	6:00 p.m.	UTEP*	No. 14	Donald W. Reynolds Razorback Stadium; Fayetteville, AR	ESPNU	W 58–21	67,330	
November 20	6:00 p.m.	at No. 22 Mississippi State	No. 13	Davis Wade Stadium; Starkville, MS	ESPN	W 38–31 ^{2OT}	56,406	
November 27	2:30 p.m.	No. 6 LSU	No. 12	War Memorial Stadium; Little Rock, AR (rivalry)	CBS	W 31–23	55,808	
January 4	8:00 p.m.	vs. No. 6 Ohio State*	No. 8	Louisiana Superdome; New Orleans, LA (Sugar Bowl, College GameDay)	ESPN	L 26–31	73,879	
*Non-conference game; ^{†}Homecoming; Rankings from AP Poll released prior to the game; All times are in Central time

- ‡ New Donald W. Reynolds Razorback Stadium attendance record

== Rankings ==
Ranking movements Legend: ██ Increase in ranking ██ Decrease in ranking
	Week															
Poll	Pre	1	2	3	4	5	6	7	8	9	10	11	12	13	14	Final
AP	17	14	12	10	15	11	12	21	19	17	14	13	12	8	8	12
Coaches	19	15	13	11	15	13	13	21	18	19	14	13	12	8	8	12
Harris	Not released						13	20	18	17	14	13	12	8	8	Not released
BCS	Not released							23	19	18	15	13	12	7	8	Not released

== Before the season ==
Quarterback Ryan Mallett had successful offseason surgery on a broken left foot. The injury occurred during a conditioning drill, and kept the Texarkana native out of spring drills. Sophomore defensive backs David Gordon and Hunter Miller were arrested on April 26 for possession of drugs. Offensive tackle DeMarcus Love was named to the Outland Trophy watchlist, and Ryan Mallett was named the frontrunner for the Davey O'Brien Award by The Sporting News. Mallett and tight end D. J. Williams were also named to numerous preseason All-American teams. Joe Adams, Greg Childs, Wade Grayson, DeMarcus Love, Jerry Franklin, Jake Bequette, DeQuinta Jones, and Jerico Nelson earned All-SEC honors. Coach Bobby Petrino, Mallett, Williams, and back-up quarterback Tyler Wilson all appeared on ESPN's College Football Live. Wide receiver Carlton Salters left the football team on July 12 in order to pursue his professional baseball career.

== Game summaries ==
=== Tennessee Tech ===
	1	2	3	4	Total
Golden Eagles	3	0	0	0	3
#17 Razorbacks	0	23	21	0	44

Arkansas met Tennessee Tech for the first time on the gridiron to open the 2010 season of lofty expectations. The Hogs started slowly, with TTU taking a 3–0 lead into the second quarter, but Arkansas was driving to close the first quarter, and running back Dennis Johnson scored from seven yards out for the Hogs' first touchdown of the season. The Arkansas defense recorded a safety on the ensuing TTU possession. Arkansas running back Broderick Green leaped in for another Razorbacks score, making the lead 16–3 for Arkansas. The Razorbacks added an 85-yard scoring pass from quarterback Ryan Mallett to Joe Adams before halftime. The Hogs came out strong in the second half, with Ronnie Wingo scoring another Razorbacks touchdown on the ground. Mallett began to click with his receivers at this point, finding Cobi Hamilton and Joe Adams for passing touchdowns. Arkansas did not punt in the contest, and won easily 44–3. This was the first time under Bobby Petrino that the Hogs kept an opponent without a touchdown.

=== Louisiana–Monroe ===
	1	2	3	4	Total
#14 Razorbacks	7	0	7	17	31
Warhawks	0	0	0	7	7

Ryan Mallett threw for four hundred yards for the third time in his career, and Greg Childs had twelve catches as Arkansas' offense rallied in the second half to finish the Warhawks. The Razorbacks offense looked lethargic in the first half, but the Arkansas defense was stout. The first score of the game came in the first quarter, Greg Childs hauling in a 19-yard touchdown pass From Ryan Mallett. Neither team scored again until the third quarter, when Mallett took a quarterback sneak one yard to paydirt. Rudell Crim of Arkansas intercepted a pass, and the Hogs drove for five minutes resulting Zach Hocker's first career field goal as a Razorback. Childs again caught a Mallett touchdown pass, diving into the end zone to make the score 24–0. At this point, Louisiana-Monroe strung a drive together and connected on a Luther Ambrose 25 yard touchdown reception from Kolton Browning. Razorback sophomore Ronnie Wingo scored on a screen pass to stretch the final margin to 31–7. Arkansas' offense had three turnovers in the contest, but the defense played well; limiting ULM to under 200 yards of total offense.

=== Georgia ===
	1	2	3	4	Total
#12 Razorbacks	7	10	7	7	31
Bulldogs	7	0	3	14	24

The Razorbacks began the SEC season by meeting Georgia in Athens, Georgia. The Hogs looked to answer critics that believe the Razorbacks cannot win an SEC game on the road. Georgia was victorious in Razorback Stadium in 2009 shootout. The Hogs had to play without the services of top running back Dennis Johnson, who suffered a season-ending injury the week previous. The Bulldogs were playing without impact receiver A. J. Green, who was suspended for selling his jersey to an agent.

The Hogs scored first only minutes into the game on a Mallett pass to Chris Gragg for a 57-yard score. Georgia freshman QB Aaron Murray scored on the ground to even the score. The Hogs responded with a Knile Davis rushing score, and a Zach Hocker field goal to take a 17–7 lead into half. After the break, Georgia kicker Blair Walsh recorded a field goal, but Mallett found Ronnie Wingo to reply. Behind by fourteen points, Georgia stormed back with Tavarres King and Washaun Ealey both scoring touchdowns to knot the game in the fourth quarter. Georgia had a chance to win the game, but a sack by Jake Bequette that tore Murry's helmet off ended the drive and forced UGA to punt. Given a chance to win the game, Mallett completed two passes to D. J. Williams to move the Hogs to the UGA 40. Childs caught a perfect pass from Mallett along the left side, and after breaking a tackle, dashed 40 yards for the game-winning score with fifteen seconds remaining. Mallett was 3 of 3 for 73 yards on the final game-winning drive, confirming his status as a Heisman Trophy contender.

=== Alabama ===
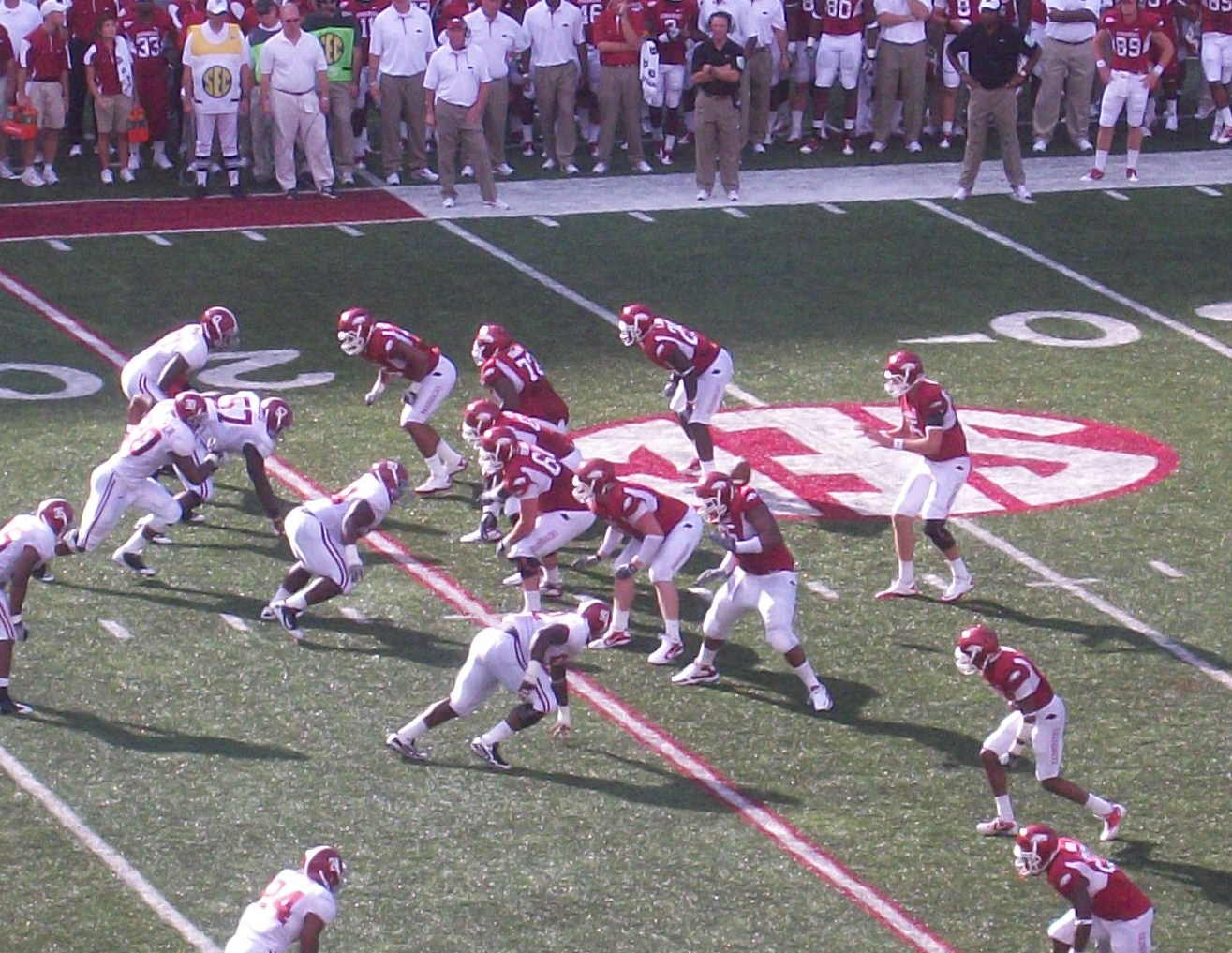
Mallett takes a snap in the shotgun in the third quarter.

	1	2	3	4	Total
#1 Crimson Tide	7	0	7	10	24
#10 Razorbacks	10	7	3	0	20

=== Texas A&M ===
	1	2	3	4	Total
#11 Razorbacks	14	7	3	0	24
Aggies	7	7	3	0	17

The Arkansas offense exploded in the first half by racking up 317 yards in the second annual Southwest Classic. The Hogs were hurt on the scoreboard by penalties and missed kicks, however. Arkansas marched the ball down the field on the opening possession, running well and capping the drive with a Joe Adams touchdown reception. The Hogs defense forced a punt on the following Aggie drive, but Ryan Mallett threw a long interception on the Razorbacks' first play. Texas A&M returned the interception to the 2-yard line, but couldn't score until fourth down. The ensuing Razorbacks possession ended when Mallett threw a 71-yard touchdown pass to Cobi Hamilton, following a very successful play action fake. Arkansas had the potential for six more points, but a Zach Hocker miss and a botched fake attempts cost the Razorbacks more points. Mallett led a 63-second drive before halftime which ended in a Ben Cleveland touchdown reception, but Texas A&M responded with a quick score to make it a 21–14 lead for the Hogs at half.

The game became a defensive affair in the second half. Arkansas sealed the game in the fourth quarter with two run-heavy possessions that ate the clock. Texas A&M had a chance to tie the game with little time left, but failed and instead turned the ball over for the fourth time. The win gave the Hogs a 2–0 edge in Southwest Classic games.

=== Auburn ===
	1	2	3	4	Total
#12 Razorbacks	7	14	14	8	43
#7 Tigers	7	20	10	28	65

Arkansas traveled to Auburn, Alabama for an SEC shootout between Ryan Mallett and Auburn's Cameron Newton. Entering the game, Arkansas and Auburn were the SEC's top two offenses, respectively, with the Razorbacks also ranking third nationally in passing offense. The game provided plenty of points as promised, but changed complexion dramatically when Mallett left the game with a concussion in the second quarter. Razorbacks junior Tyler Wilson came in and threw for over 300 yards and 4 touchdowns, but also throw two costly interceptions late.

The game was also marred by many questionable calls by officials that hindered Arkansas. The primary calls were Mario Fannin's fumble prior crossing the goal line and a fumble by Broderick Green despite being down. A statement by Arkansas' athletic director Jeff Long indicates that the University has "registered our concerns regarding several officiating calls and review decisions made by replay officials".

Arkansas began the scoring on a Mallett pass to Van Stumon, who caught just his second career pass for a seven-yard score. After Auburn responded, Arkansas engineered a twelve play drive that ended with a Broderick Green TD run. On the ensuing Auburn possession, Mario Fannin fumbled the football prior to crossing the plane of the goal line. The call was reviewed but upheld as a touchdown. This was the first of many questionable calls to hurt Arkansas. This call was later explained by the SEC offices that an on-field official had signaled touchdown, despite indisputable video evidence that no official ever indicated touchdown. Auburn also blocked a punt. Tyler Wilson relieved an injured Mallett in the second quarter, throwing a touchdown pass to Greg Childs on his second drive. This made the score 21–27 in favor of Auburn at the half.

Wilson hit Childs for another TD in the second half, but Auburn returned the subsequent kickoff 99 yards to negate the score. Wilson replied with by completing a long flea flicker pass to Childs, followed by two passes to Joe Adams to hit paydirt. Wilson and the Razorbacks drove again, scoring on another Childs touchdown reception and two-point conversion reception. This scoring frenzy gave Arkansas a 43–37 lead. Auburn responded with a passing TD, and controversy ensued on Arkansas' next possession. Running back Broderick Green fumbled the football after being tackled. After a long review period, the play was not overturned and Auburn took possession. This call was heavily questioned by Bobby Petrino and the Razorback coaching staff. Auburn continued to a 65–43 victory.

A positive for the Razorbacks was receiver Greg Childs, who caught nine passes for 164 yards and two touchdowns.

=== Ole Miss ===
	1	2	3	4	Total
Rebels	0	3	7	14	24
#21 Razorbacks	14	7	3	14	38

=== Vanderbilt ===
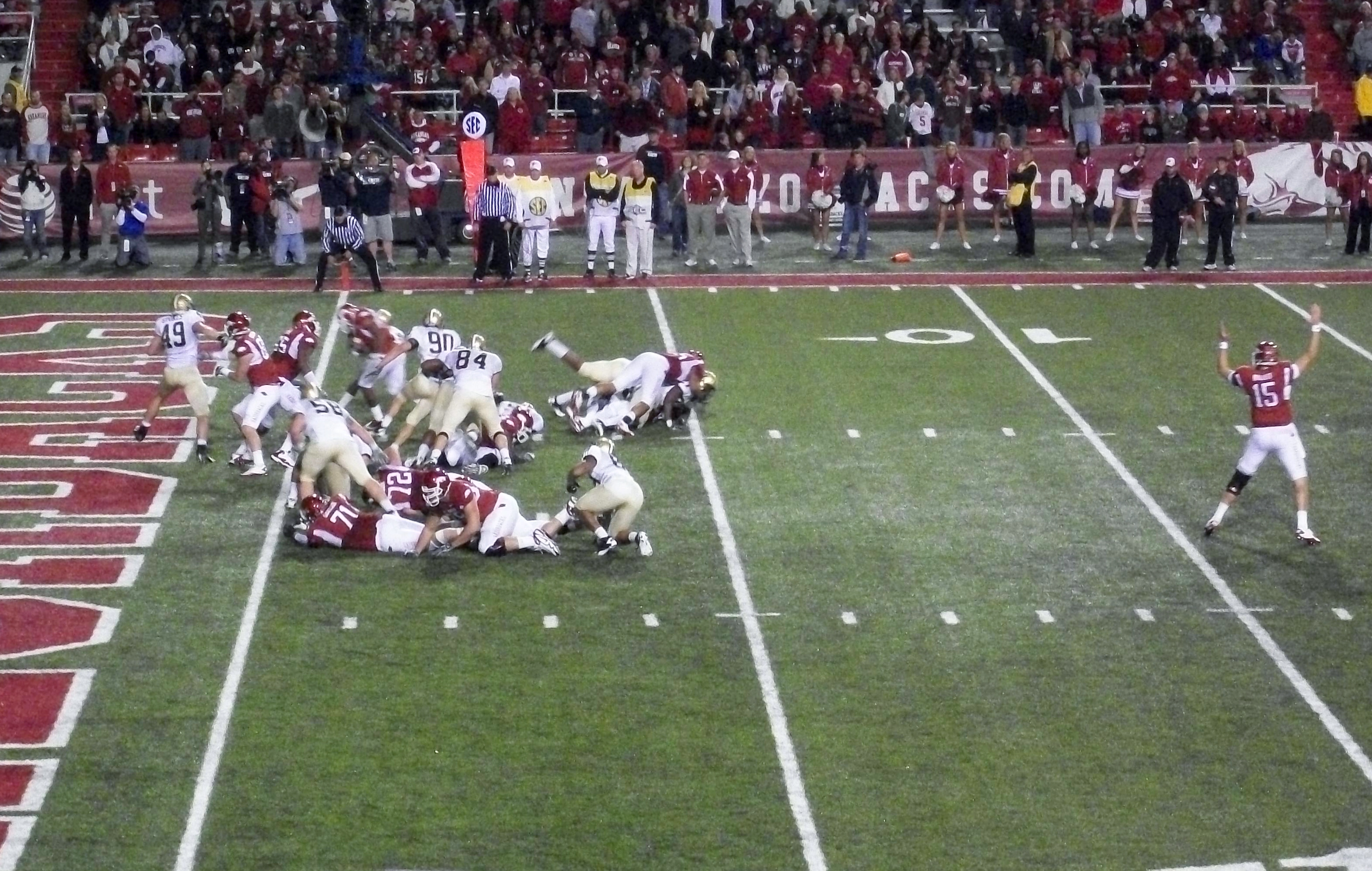
Knile Davis scores a touchdown in the fourth quarter to make the score 42–14 in favor of Arkansas.

	1	2	3	4	Total
Commodores	14	0	0	0	14
#19 Razorbacks	6	26	3	14	49

=== South Carolina ===
	1	2	3	4	Total
#17 Razorbacks	7	17	10	7	41
#18 Gamecocks	7	3	0	10	20

=== UTEP ===
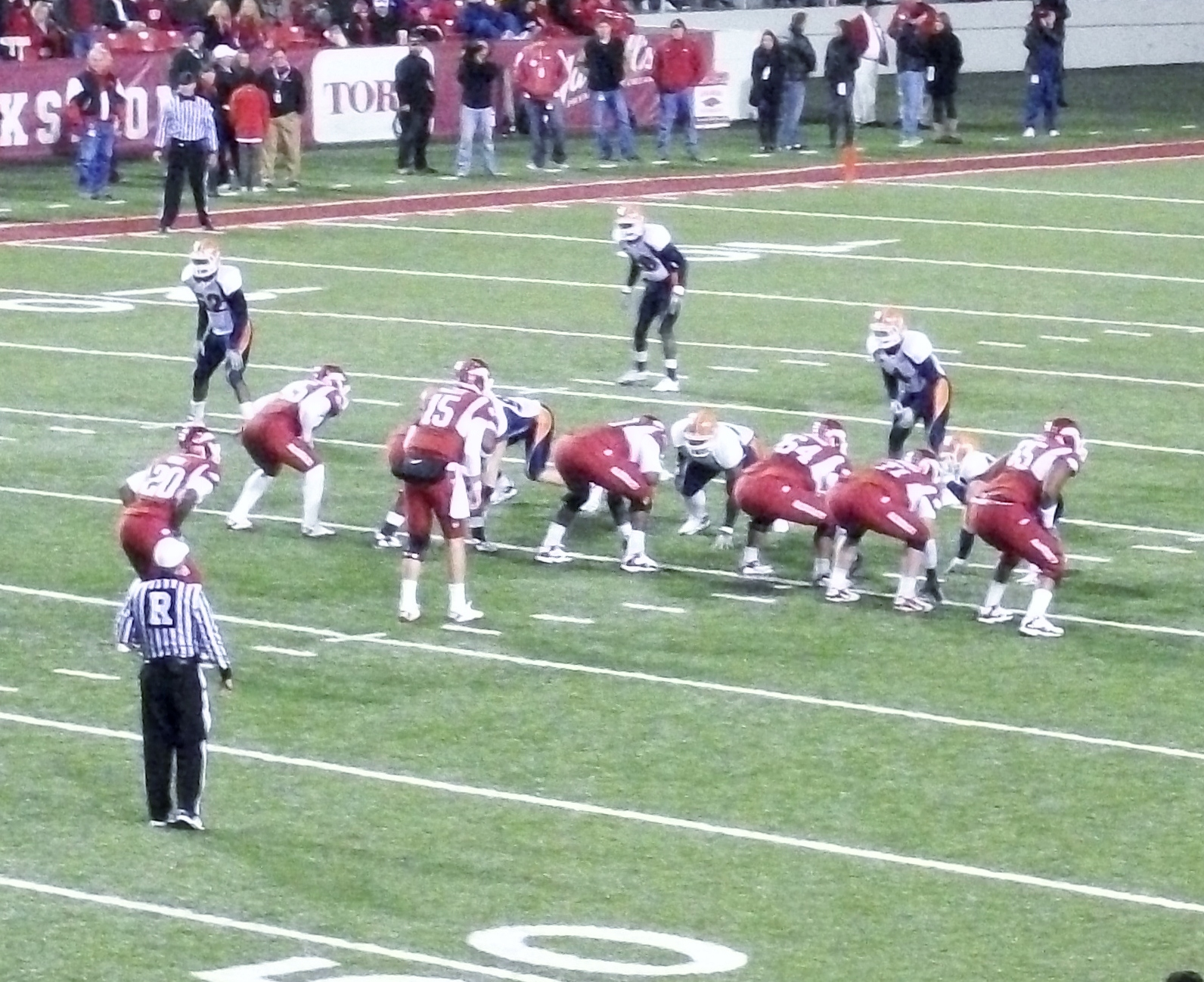
Ronnie Wingo (20) stands behind Mallett in the pistol formation against the Miners.

	1	2	3	4	Total
Miners	14	0	0	7	21
#14 Razorbacks	21	14	14	9	58

=== Mississippi State ===
	1	2	3	4	OT	2OT	Total
#13 Razorbacks	14	3	7	7	0	7	38
#22 Bulldogs	7	14	0	10	0	0	31

=== LSU ===
	1	2	3	4	Total
#6 Tigers	0	14	6	3	23
#12 Razorbacks	7	14	0	10	31

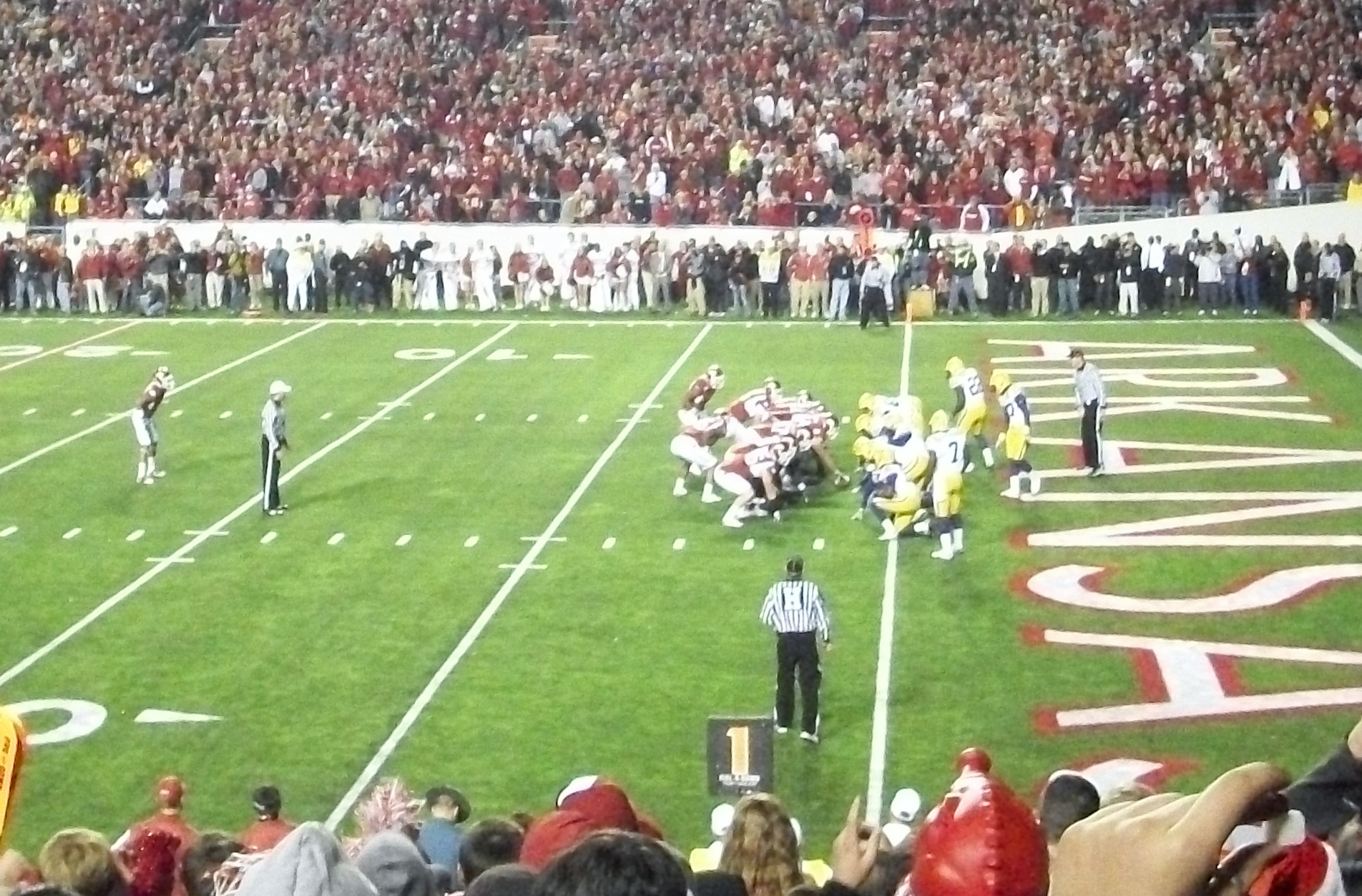
Mallett kneels down on the one-yard line to finish the game. The win is the Hogs' third in four years against their rivals.

Arkansas met LSU in Little Rock, and the Hogs earned a season-defining 31–23 victory. Arkansas' second-ranked offense met the Tigers' top-ranked defense, but the Hogs recorded 464 yards of total offense against the Tigers. Arkansas's sophomore running back Knile Davis rushed for 152 yards, including nine straight rushes on the final Arkansas drive, and Ryan Mallett broke the school record with 60 touchdown passes in the contest. Cobi Hamilton of Arkansas had three catches for 164 yards and two touchdowns of 80+ yards, including a long score with six seconds remaining before halftime. Stevan Ridley had two rushing scores for LSU, and Jordan Jefferson completed 16 of 27 passes for 184 yards. Arkansas and LSU both closed the regular season at 10–2, with Arkansas finishing second in the SEC West behind Auburn. This was the team's last win over LSU until the 2014 season.

On December 5, the Razorbacks were invited to the 2011 Sugar Bowl. This was Arkansas' first ever BCS berth.

=== Ohio State—Sugar Bowl ===
#6 Ohio State at #8 Arkansas

Team	1	2	3	4	Total
• #6 Ohio State	14	14	3	0	31
#8 Arkansas	7	3	11	5	26

- Location: Louisiana Superdome
  New Orleans
- Game start: 8:30 p.m. EST

The Ohio State Buckeyes headed to the Superdome to take on the Arkansas Razorbacks. The Buckeyes came into the game 0–9 against the SEC in bowl games. The Buckeyes struck first, with Dane Sanzenbacher recovering a fumble in the end zone after Terrelle Pryor fumbled on the 3 yard line. Arkansas struck back with Ryan Mallett connecting with Joe Adams on a 17-yard pass. Dan Herron added a 9-yard run, and Sanzenbacher and DeVier Posey caught touchdown passes of 15 and 43 yards respectively to give the Buckeyes a big lead. Zach Hocker hit a 20-yard field goal as time expired and the Razorbacks were down 28–10 at the half.

In the third quarter, the momentum shifted Arkansas' direction. Hocker and Devin Barclay traded field goals, then Mallett connected with Jarius Wright for a touchdown, then made the two-point conversion on a pass to D. J. Williams to pull within ten. The Razorbacks closed the gap further in the fourth, on a safety by Jake Bequette and another field goal by Hocker. With just over a minute left, Arkansas blocked Ohio State's punt and recovered on the 18 yard line. However, Mallett's second pass attempt was intercepted and the Buckeyes ran out the clock and won, 31–26. Initially Ohio State's first bowl win over an SEC opponent, Ohio State's win was subsequently vacated when Ohio State later vacated their entire 2010 football season because of NCAA violations involving improper benefits to some of their players.

== Personnel ==
=== Coaching staff ===
2010 Arkansas Razorbacks coaching staff
Head coaches: Head coach – Bobby Petrino; Offensive coaches: Offensive coordinator/quarterbacks – Garrick McGee; Running backs – Tim Horton; Tight ends – Chip Long; Wide receivers – Kris Cinkovich; Offensive line – Chris Klenakis; Defensive coaches: Defensive coordinator/secondary – Willy Robinson; Inside linebackers – Reggie Johnson; Defensive tackles – Bobby Allen; Defensive ends – Steve Caldwell; Graduate assistant – Marty Biagi	Special teams: Special teams coordinator/outside linebackers – John L. Smith; Administrative staff: Athletic director (AD) – Jeff Long; Director of high school relations – Dean Campbell; Director of on-campus recruiting/eligibility coordinator – Dann Kabala; Director of football operations – Mark Robinson; Strength and conditioning – Jason Veltkamp; Recruiting coordinator – Tim Horton

=== Roster ===
2010 Arkansas Razorbacks roster
2010 Roster from the University of Arkansas Razorbacks Athletics
Quarterbacks: 8 Tyler Wilson – (redshirt) sophomore; 9 Jacoby Walker – freshman; 15 Ryan Mallett – (redshirt) junior; 17 Brandon Mitchell – sophomore; Tailbacks: 7 Knile Davis – sophomore; 10 Braylon Mitchell – freshman; 20 Ronnie Wingo, Jr. – sophomore; 24 Larry Ward, Jr.- "Freshman"; 29 Broderick Green – junior; 33 Dennis Johnson – junior; -- Ronald Watkins – (redshirt) sophomore; Fullbacks: 44 Van Stumon – (redshirt) senior; -- Brandon Pyle – sophomore; Wide receivers: 1 Marquel Wade – freshman; 2 Julian Horton – freshman; 3 Joe Adams – junior; 4 Jarius Wright – junior; 11 Cobi Hamilton – sophomore; 19 Javontee Herndon – freshman; 23 De'Anthony Curtis – junior; 83 Lance Ray – (redshirt) freshman; 84 Price Holmes – sophomore; 85 Greg Childs – junior; 89 Austin Tucker – (redshirt) junior; -- Alvin Chambers – sophomore; -- Ryan Farr – sophomore; -- Telvin Griffin – sophomore; -- Alex Nerney – junior; -- William Seranno – sophomore; -- Justin Wortman – sophomore	Tight ends: 45 D.J. Williams – senior; 48 Brad Hefley – freshman; 80 Chris Gragg – sophomore; 86 Ben Cleveland – (redshirt) senior; 87 Austin Tate – freshman; 88 Garrett Uekman – Freshman; Offensive line: 63 Colby Berna – (redshirt) freshman; 66 Denton Simek – freshman; 67 Alvin Bailey – (redshirt) freshman; -- Blake Gunderson – sophomore; Offensive tackles: 65 DeMarcus Love – (redshirt) senior; 73 Ray Dominguez – (redshirt) senior; 75 Luke Charpentier – freshman; 76 Tyler Deacon – (redshirt) sophomore; 78 Anthony Oden – sophomore; 79 Grant Freeman – (redshirt) junior; Offensive guards: 70 Zhamal Thomas – senior; 71 Wade Grayson – senior; 72 Grant Cook – (redshirt) junior; 74 Cam Feldt – freshman; Centers: 60 Seth Oxner – (redshirt) junior; 64 Travis Swanson – (redshirt) freshman; 68 Clay Bemberg – (redshirt) senior; Defensive ends: 83 Darrick Sullivan – freshman; 43 Tenarius Wright – (redshirt) sophomore; 58 Damario Ambrose – senior; 90 Colton Miles-Nash – sophomore; 91 Jake Bequette – (redshirt) junior; 97 Ryan Calendar – (redshirt) freshman; 98 Caleb Evans – senior; -- Will Coleman – sophomore; -- Brooks Reimer – freshman	Defensive tackles: 51 Alfred Davis – (redshirt) sophomore; 54 Byran Jones – freshman; 61 Zach Stadther – junior; 92 DeQuinta Jones – sophomore; 95 Patrick Jones – senior; 96 Jeremiah Jackson – freshman; -- Jared Green – junior; Linebackers: 1 Anthony Leon – senior; 31 Jerico Nelson – sophomore; 25 Chris Milam – sophomore; 32 Bret Harris – (redshirt) junior; 34 Jerry Franklin – (redshirt) junior; 41 Ryan Powers – (redshirt) senior; 46 Freddy Burton – senior; 50 Stephen Barnett – junior; 53 Jermaine Love – senior; 55 Austin Moss – sophomore; Cornerbacks: 4 Rudell Crim – senior; 6 Isaac Madison – junior; 13 Seth Armbrust – (redshirt) senior; 21 Darius Winston – sophomore; 26 Ramon Broadway – (redshirt) senior; 28 Greg Gatson – sophomore; 36 Andru Stewart – junior; Safeties: 5 Tramain Thomas – junior; 9 Elton Ford – junior; 24 Daunte Carr – freshman; 35 Ross Rasner – freshman; 38 Jerry Mitchell – (redshirt) freshman; -- Dustin Cain – senior	Athletes: 14 Eric Bennett – freshman; 22 Darrell Smith – freshman; 27 Alan Turner – freshman; 39 Jarrett Lake – freshman; 49 Jatashun Beachum – freshman; Punters/Kickers: 2 Alex Tejada – senior; 14 Dylan Breeding – sophomore; 18 Zach Hocker – freshman; 40 Eduardo Camara – freshman; -- Cameron Bryan – (redshirt) sophomore; Long snappers: 59 Rhett Richardson – (redshirt) junior; 62 Nick Brewer – junior; -- Robby Cox – (redshirt) sophomore; -- Derrell Hartwick – (redshirt) junior; Terms: Freshman – A player in his first year.; Sophomore – A player in his second year.; Junior – A player in his third year.; Senior – A player in his fourth year.; Redshirt – A player who sat out a previous season.

=== Recruits ===
College recruiting information (2010)
Name	Hometown	School	Height	Weight	40^{‡}	Commit date
Calvin Barnett; DT	Tulsa, Oklahoma	Booker T. Washington High School	6 ft 3 in (1.91 m)	318 lb (144 kg)	5.1	Feb 3, 2010
Calvin Barnett; DT	Recruit ratings: Scout: Rivals: (79)					
Jatashun Beachum; ATH	Dallas, Texas	A. Maceo Smith High School	6 ft 2 in (1.88 m)	270 lb (120 kg)	4.65	Jan 17, 2010
Jatashun Beachum; ATH	Recruit ratings: Scout: Rivals: (79)					
Eric Bennett; ATH	Tulsa, Oklahoma	Booker T. Washington High School	6 ft 10 in (2.08 m)	230 lb (100 kg)	4.29	Oct 18, 2009
Eric Bennett; ATH	Recruit ratings: Scout: Rivals: (75)					
LaCraig Brown; DT	Monroe, Louisiana	Richwood HS	6 ft 4 in (1.93 m)	268 lb (122 kg)	4.92	Jan 4, 2010
LaCraig Brown; DT	Recruit ratings: Scout: Rivals: (40)					
Eduardo Camara; K	Cedar Hill, Texas	Cedar Hill HS	5 ft 8 in (1.73 m)	157 lb (71 kg)	N/A	Jul 8, 2009
Eduardo Camara; K	Recruit ratings: Scout: Rivals: (77)					
Daunte Carr; DB	Gainesville, Georgia	Gainesville HS	6 ft 2.5 in (1.89 m)	200 lb (91 kg)	4.57	Jan 17, 2010
Daunte Carr; DB	Recruit ratings: Scout: Rivals: (79)					
Luke Charpentier; OL	River Ridge, Louisiana	John Curtis HS	6 ft 4.5 in (1.94 m)	298 lb (135 kg)	5.1	Nov 10, 2009
Luke Charpentier; OL	Recruit ratings: Scout: Rivals: (73)					
Cam Feldt; OL	Pilot Point, Texas	Pilot Point HS	6 ft 4.5 in (1.94 m)	293 lb (133 kg)	5.30	Jul 24, 2008
Cam Feldt; OL	Recruit ratings: Scout: Rivals: (81)					
Courtney Gaston; LB	Fort Gibson, Oklahoma	Fort Gibson HS	6 ft 4 in (1.93 m)	215 lb (98 kg)	4.5	Sep 29, 2009
Courtney Gaston; LB	Recruit ratings: Scout: Rivals: (76)					
Brad Hefley; ATH	Joplin, Missouri	Joplin HS	6 ft 4.5 in (1.94 m)	253 lb (115 kg)	4.75	Jun 16, 2009
Brad Hefley; ATH	Recruit ratings: Scout: Rivals: (76)					
Javontee Herndon; WR	Jacksonville, Florida	Bolles School	6 ft 1 in (1.85 m)	178 lb (81 kg)	4.5	Feb 3, 2010
Javontee Herndon; WR	Recruit ratings: Scout: Rivals: (40)					
Zach Hocker; K	Russellville, Arkansas	Russellville HS	5 ft 11.5 in (1.82 m)	168 lb (76 kg)	N/A	Feb 1, 2010
Zach Hocker; K	Recruit ratings: Scout: Rivals: (76)					
Julian Horton; ATH	Norcross, Georgia	Greater Atlanta Christian	6 ft 1 in (1.85 m)	182 lb (83 kg)	4.50	Jan 17, 2010
Julian Horton; ATH	Recruit ratings: Scout: Rivals: (78)					
Maudrecus Humphrey; WR	Hoover, Alabama	Hoover HS	6 ft 2 in (1.88 m)	185 lb (84 kg)	4.5	Jan 24, 2010
Maudrecus Humphrey; WR	Recruit ratings: Scout: Rivals: (77)					
Jeremiah Jackson; DT	Hoover, Alabama	Spain Park HS	6 ft 2 in (1.88 m)	263 lb (119 kg)	N/A	Jun 13, 2009
Jeremiah Jackson; DT	Recruit ratings: Scout: Rivals: (78)					
Byran Jones; DT	Junction City, Arkansas	Junction City HS	6 ft 2.5 in (1.89 m)	304 lb (138 kg)	5.10	Feb 3, 2010
Byran Jones; DT	Recruit ratings: Scout: Rivals: (78)					
Jarrett Lake; ATH	Jenks, Oklahoma	Jenks HS	6 ft 2 in (1.88 m)	205 lb (93 kg)	N/A	Feb 3, 2010
Jarrett Lake; ATH	Recruit ratings: Scout: Rivals: (79)					
Braylon Mitchell; ATH	Heber Springs, Arkansas	Heber Springs HS	6 ft 2 in (1.88 m)	212 lb (96 kg)	N/A	Jul 8, 2009
Braylon Mitchell; ATH	Recruit ratings: Scout: Rivals: (77)					
Denton Simek; OL	Prague, Oklahoma	Prague HS	6 ft 6 in (1.98 m)	265 lb (120 kg)	4.9	Feb 3, 2010
Denton Simek; OL	Recruit ratings: Scout: Rivals: (77)					
Chris Smith; DE	Mount Ulla, North Carolina	West Rowan HS	6 ft 1.5 in (1.87 m)	225 lb (102 kg)	4.61	Jun 6, 2009
Chris Smith; DE	Recruit ratings: Scout: Rivals: (77)					
Darrell Smith; DB	Port Saint Joe, Florida	Point Saint Joe HS	6 ft 2 in (1.88 m)	185 lb (84 kg)	4.5	Sep 14, 2009
Darrell Smith; DB	Recruit ratings: Scout: Rivals: (76)					
Alan Turner; ATH	Junction City, Arkansas	Junction City HS	5 ft 11 in (1.80 m)	183 lb (83 kg)	4.5	Feb 3, 2010
Alan Turner; ATH	Recruit ratings: Scout: Rivals: (60)					
Garrett Uekman; TE	Little Rock, Arkansas	LR Catholic	6 ft 4 in (1.93 m)	235 lb (107 kg)	4.68	Jun 10, 2009
Garrett Uekman; TE	Recruit ratings: Scout: Rivals: (75)					
Marquel Wade; WR	Jacksonville, Florida	Andrew Jackson HS	5 ft 10.5 in (1.79 m)	180 lb (82 kg)	4.49	Nov 1, 2009
Marquel Wade; WR	Recruit ratings: Scout: Rivals: (74)					
Jacoby Walker; QB	Spring, Texas	Westfield HS	6 ft 1.5 in (1.87 m)	204 lb (93 kg)	4.65	Dec 21, 2009
Jacoby Walker; QB	Recruit ratings: Scout: Rivals: (75)					
Montaque Mack; OLB	Jacksonville, Florida	Andrew Jackson HS	6 ft 2 in (1.88 m)	190 lb (86 kg)	N/A	Nov 1, 2009
Montaque Mack; OLB	Recruit ratings: No ratings found					
Overall recruit ranking: Scout: 35 Rivals: 49
‡ Refers to 40-yard dash; Note: In many cases, Scout, Rivals, 247Sports, On3, and ESPN may conflict in their listings of height, weight and 40 time.; In these cases, the average was taken. ESPN grades are on a 100-point scale.; Sources: "Scout.com Football Recruiting: Arkansas". Scout.; "Scout.com Team Recruiting Rankings". Scout.; "2010 Team Ranking". Rivals.com.

== Statistics ==
=== Team ===
	Team	Opp
Scoring	474	304
Points per game	36.5	23.4
First downs	291	236
Rushing	105	118
Passing	173	102
Penalty	13	16
Total offense	6273	4523
Avg per play	7.1	5.2
Avg per game	482.5	347.9
Fumbles-Lost	23–9	27–14
Penalties-Yards	108–831	92–678
Avg per game	63.9	52.2

	Team	Opp
Punts-Yards	54-2255	72-3034
Avg per punt	41.8	42.1
Time of possession/Game	30:22	29:38
3rd down conversions	68/165	62/185
4th down conversions	9/19	14/21
Touchdowns scored	60	37
Field goals-Attempts-Long	16–19	15–19
PAT-Attempts	56–58	37–37
Attendance	413591	311739
Games/Avg per Game	6/68932	4/77935
Neutral Games/Avg per Game	3/65069	

==== Scores by quarter ====
	1	2	3	4	OT	Total
Opponents	87	75	39	103	0	304
Razorbacks	121	145	103	98	7	474

=== Offense ===
==== Rushing ====
Name	GP-GS	Att	Gain	Loss	Net	Avg	TD	Long	Avg/G
Knile Davis	13–8	204	1362	40	1322	6.5	13	71	101.7
Broderick Green	13–2	104	389	24	365	3.5	3	23	28.1
Ronnie Wingo Jr.	13–5	41	260	7	253	6.2	1	32	19.5
Dennis Johnson	2–0	9	85	2	83	9.2	1	49	41.5
Joe Adams	12–4	6	32	0	32	5.3	0	12	2.7
Jarius Wright	13–13	1	9	0	9	9.0	0	9	0.7
Ronald Watkins	2–0	1	5	0	5	5.0	0	5	2.5
Brandon Mitchell	4–0	2	5	6	−1	−0.5	0	5	−0.2
Austin Tucker	13–0	1	0	6	−6	−6.0	0	0	−0.5
Dylan Breeding	13–0	1	5	12	−7	−7.0	0	0	−0.5
TEAM	8–0	3	0	22	−22	−7.3	0	0	−2.8
Tyler Wilson	6–0	4	0	24	−24	−6.0	0	0	−4.0
Ryan Mallett	13–13	44	59	133	−74	−1.7	4	14	−5.7
Total	13	421	2211	276	1935	4.6	22	71	148.8
Opponents	13	522	2528	414	2114	4.0	21	54	162.6

==== Passing ====
Name	GP-GS	Effic	Att-Cmp-Int	Pct	Yds	TD	Lng	Avg/G
Total								

==== Receiving ====
Name	GP-GS	No.	Yds	Avg	TD	Long	Avg/G
Total							

=== Defense ===
Name	GP	Tackles				Sacks	Pass defense		Interceptions				Fumbles		Blkd Kick
Name	GP	Solo	Ast	Total	TFL-Yds	No-Yds	BrUp	QBH	No.-Yds	Avg	TD	Long	Rcv-Yds	FF	Blkd Kick
Total															

=== Special teams ===
Name	Punting								Kickoffs				
Name	No.	Yds	Avg	Long	TB	FC	I20	Blkd	No.	Yds	Avg	TB	OB
Total													

Name	Punt returns					Kick returns				
Name	No.	Yds	Avg	TD	Long	No.	Yds	Avg	TD	Long
Total										
