= Damario Ambrose =

American football player (born 1989)

No. 50
- Position: Linebacker

Personal information
- Born: September 9, 1989 (age 37); Mobile, Alabama, U.S.
- Listed height: 6 ft 5 in (1.96 m)
- Listed weight: 270 lb (122 kg)

Career information
- High school: Mobile (AL) Davidson
- College: Arkansas
- NFL draft: 2011: undrafted

Career history
- St. Louis Rams (2011)*; New York Jets (2012)*; Iowa Barnstormers (2013)
- * Offseason or practice squad member only

Career AFL statistics
- Total tackles: 8
- Sacks: 1.5
- Stats at ArenaFan.com
- Stats at Pro Football Reference

Damario Ambrose (born September 9, 1989) is an American former football linebacker. He played college football at Arkansas. Ambrose entered the 2011 NFL draft but went undrafted. He was signed by the St. Louis Rams as an undrafted free agent in 2011.

== Early life ==
Ambrose was born in Mobile, Alabama and attended Davidson High School. After his Senior season in high school, Ambrose was selected to the second-team all-region honors. He was ranked the No. 19 prospect in State of Alabama and was ranked the No. 35 strong side defensive end in the nation.

College recruiting
Name	Hometown	School	Height	Weight	40^{‡}	Commit date
Damario Ambrose; Defensive end	Mobile, Alabama	Davidson High School	6 ft 4 in (1.93 m)	240 lb (110 kg)	4.8	Dec 8, 2006
Damario Ambrose; Defensive end	Recruit ratings: Scout: Rivals:					
Overall recruit ranking: Scout: 100 (DE) Rivals: 3 (DE), 19 (AL)
‡ Refers to 40-yard dash; Note: In many cases, Scout, Rivals, 247Sports, On3, and ESPN may conflict in their listings of height, weight and 40 time.; In these cases, the average was taken. ESPN grades are on a 100-point scale.; Sources: "Arkansas Football Commitments". Rivals.; "2007 Arkansas Football Recruiting Commits". Scout.; "Scout.com Team Recruiting Rankings". Scout.; "2007 Team Ranking". Rivals.com.

== College career ==
Ambrose played at the University of Arkansas. He finished college with 79 tackles, 6.5 sacks and a forced fumble.

In his Freshman season, he finished the season with 12 tackles and a sack. In 2007, he received the SEC First-team All-Freshman honors. On October 1, 2007, Ambrose was named the SEC Defensive Lineman of the Week for his performance against North Texas in which Arkansas Razorbacks won the game 66–7.

In his Sophomore season, he finished the season with 21 tackles along with 2 sacks.

In the Junior season, he played and started 13 games in which he had 13 tackles. On November 7, 2009, he recorded 3 tackles against South Carolina in which Arkansas wins the game 33–16.

In his Senior season, he finished the season with 33 tackles, 3.5 sacks, a pass defended and a Forced fumble. On September 18, 2010, he recorded 4 tackles along with 2 sacks and a forced fumble against Georgia as Arkansas wins 31–24.

== Professional career ==
=== St. Louis Rams ===
He was signed by the St. Louis Rams as an undrafted free agent. On September 3, 2011 he was released a couple of days before the 2011 regular season.

=== New York Jets ===
On August 3, 2012 Ambrose signed with the New York Jets. On August 27, 2012, he was released.

=== Iowa Barnstormers ===
On December 3, 2012, he signed with the Iowa Barnstormers of the Arena Football League. On March 16, 2013, he was placed on injured reserve.
