= D'Aundre Reed =

American football player (born 1988)

No. 91
- Position: Defensive end

Personal information
- Born: January 1, 1988 (age 38); Sacramento, California, U.S.
- Listed height: 6 ft 4 in (1.93 m)
- Listed weight: 260 lb (118 kg)

Career information
- High school: Rancho Verde (Moreno Valley, California)
- College: Arizona
- NFL draft: 2011: 7th round, 215th overall pick

Career history
- Minnesota Vikings (2011–2012); San Francisco 49ers (2013)*; Jacksonville Jaguars (2013–2014)*; Los Angeles Kiss (2014); Miami Dolphins (2014)*
- * Offseason or practice squad member only

Career AFL statistics
- Total tackles: 2
- Forced fumbles: 1
- Stats at ArenaFan.com
- Stats at Pro Football Reference

D'Aundre Reed (born January 1, 1988) is an American former professional football defensive end. He was selected by the Minnesota Vikings with the 215th overall pick in the seventh round of the 2011 NFL draft. He was also a member of the San Francisco 49ers, Jacksonville Jaguars, Los Angeles Kiss, and Miami Dolphins.

== Professional career ==
Pre-draft measurables
Height	Weight	Arm length	Hand span	Wingspan	40-yard dash	10-yard split	20-yard split	20-yard shuttle	Three-cone drill	Vertical jump	Broad jump	Bench press
6 ft 3 7/8 in (1.93 m)	261 lb (118 kg)	33 1/2 in (0.85 m)	10 1/4 in (0.26 m)	6 ft 8 3/4 in (2.05 m)	4.75 s	1.66 s	2.76 s	4.32 s	7.24 s	36.0 in (0.91 m)	10 ft 5 in (3.18 m)	30 reps
All values from NFL Scouting Combine/Pro Day

=== Minnesota Vikings ===
Reed was released by the Minnesota Vikings on August 31, 2013 (along with 18 others) to get to their final 53-man roster.

=== San Francisco 49ers ===
Reed was signed to the San Francisco 49ers practice squad on September 24, 2013.

=== Jacksonville Jaguars ===
Reed was signed to the Jacksonville Jaguars' practice squad on December 17, 2013. He was signed to the active roster at the conclusion of the 2013 regular season.

=== Los Angeles KISS ===
Reed was assigned to the Los Angeles KISS of the Arena Football League on May 22, 2014.

=== Miami Dolphins ===
On July 29, 2014, Reed was signed by the Miami Dolphins.
