= Caleb King =

American football player (born 1988)

No. 38
- Position: Running back

Personal information
- Born: January 10, 1988 (age 38); Norcross, Georgia, U.S.
- Listed height: 5 ft 11 in (1.80 m)
- Listed weight: 217 lb (98 kg)

Career information
- High school: Parkview
- College: Georgia
- NFL draft: 2011: undrafted

Career history
- Minnesota Vikings (2011)

Awards and highlights
- Freshman All-SEC (2008)
- Stats at Pro Football Reference

Caleb King (born January 10, 1988) is an American former professional football running back who was a member of the Minnesota Vikings of the National Football League (NFL). He was signed by the Vikings as a rookie free agent in 2011. He played college football at Georgia, redshirting in 2007 and playing from 2008 to 2010.

== College career ==
Despite King's heralded status as a recruit he was redshirted for the 2007 season. In his career at Georgia, he rushed 255 times for 1,271 yards and 10 touchdowns while adding 16 catches for 126 yards and a touchdown. He was ruled academically ineligible for the 2011 football season.

== Professional career ==
After being signed as a free agent, he played in one preseason game in 2011 for the Vikings against the Houston Texans, rushing for 62 yards and two touchdowns on 19 carries. King was activated to the Vikings' roster for Week 17 against the Chicago Bears but did not play.
