= Gregory Gatson =

American football player (born 1989)

No. 31
- Position: Cornerback

Personal information
- Born: March 24, 1989 (age 37); Dallas, Texas, U.S.
- Listed height: 5 ft 11 in (1.80 m)
- Listed weight: 180 lb (82 kg)

Career information
- High school: Germantown (Germantown, Tennessee)
- College: Arkansas
- NFL draft: 2012: undrafted

Career history
- San Diego Chargers (2012); Carolina Panthers (2013)*
- * Offseason or practice squad member only

Career NFL statistics
- Games played: 2
- Stats at Pro Football Reference

Gregory Gatson (born March 24, 1989) is an American former professional football player who was a cornerback for the San Diego Chargers of the National Football League (NFL). He played college football for the Arkansas Razorbacks.
