= DeMarcus Love =

American football player (born 1988)

No. 73
- Position: Offensive tackle

Personal information
- Born: March 7, 1988 (age 38); Heaton Moor, Stockport, England
- Listed height: 6 ft 4 in (1.93 m)
- Listed weight: 315 lb (143 kg)

Career information
- High school: Dallas Carter (Dallas, Texas, U.S.)
- College: Arkansas
- NFL draft: 2011: 6th round, 168th overall pick

Career history
- Minnesota Vikings (2011−2013); Jacksonville Jaguars (2013); New York Giants (2014)*; New Orleans Saints (2014)*; Denver Broncos (2014)*; Atlanta Falcons (2015)*
- * Offseason or practice squad member only

Awards and highlights
- First-team All-SEC (2010)
- Stats at Pro Football Reference

Demarcus Love (born March 7, 1988) is an American former professional football offensive tackle. He played college football at the University of Arkansas. Love was selected with the 168th overall pick in the 2011 NFL draft by the Minnesota Vikings.

== Early life ==
Love attended David W. Carter High School, in Dallas, Texas, where he was a teammate of Michael Crabtree. He was a starter at offensive tackle as a sophomore before being replaced by Curtis Bailey, and moved to offensive guard for his junior and senior seasons for Coach Allen Wilson. As a senior, he helped his team to an 11–1 record and a second-round state playoff berth in the state's largest classification (5A).

Regarded as a three-star recruit by Rivals.com, Love was listed as the No. 57 offensive tackle prospect in the class of 2006. He chose Arkansas over Kansas, Arizona, UTEP and Kansas State.

== College career ==
After redshirting his initial year at Arkansas, Love played in eight games and started the final three contests of the 2007 season at right guard against Mississippi State, LSU and Missouri in the Cotton Bowl. In 2008, he started eight games for the year, all at strong guard, and played in 11.

In his junior season, Love started all 13 games for the Razorbacks and was a member of an offensive line which blocked for a unit that led the SEC in scoring offense (36.0). For his senior season, he was moved to left tackle. He was named Preseason All-SEC First-team in 2010.

== Professional career ==
Pre-draft measurables
Height	Weight	Arm length	Hand span	Wingspan	40-yard dash	10-yard split	20-yard split	20-yard shuttle	Three-cone drill	Vertical jump	Broad jump	Bench press
6 ft 4 3/8 in (1.94 m)	315 lb (143 kg)	35 1/4 in (0.90 m)	9 1/2 in (0.24 m)	6 ft 11 1/2 in (2.12 m)	5.07 s	1.70 s	2.95 s	4.84 s	7.84 s	26.5 in (0.67 m)	8 ft 1 in (2.46 m)	27 reps
All values from NFL Combine/Pro Day

=== Minnesota Vikings ===
Love was selected with the 168th overall pick in the 6th round of the draft by the Minnesota Vikings. He was inactive for all 16 Regular Season games in the 2011 season despite making the team out of training camp.

After the arrival of fellow offensive tackle Matt Kalil, Love made a deal to give Kalil his collegiate number 75 and instead assumed ownership over number 73.

On August 1, 2013, Love was suspended four games for violating the NFL's policy on performance-enhancing substances. Following his return from suspension, Love was released by the Vikings on October 1, 2013.

=== Jacksonville Jaguars ===
On October 3, 2013, Love was signed to the Jacksonville Jaguars practice squad. He was promoted to the active roster on October 9.

Love was waived on November 4, 2013. He was re-signed to the practice squad on November 6. He was signed to a reserve/future contract on December 30, 2013.

Love was released on June 9, 2014.

=== New York Giants ===
Love signed with the New York Giants on June 19, 2014. He was waived on July 28, 2014.

=== New Orleans Saints ===
Love was signed to the practice squad of the New Orleans Saints on October 21, 2014. He was released on December 16, 2014.

=== Denver Broncos ===
Love was signed to the practice squad of the Denver Broncos on December 18, 2014.

=== Atlanta Falcons ===
Love signed with the Atlanta Falcons on July 29, 2015. He was released on August 17, 2015, with injury settlement.
