= 2006 All-Big East Conference football team =

American college football all-star team

The 2006 All-Big East Conference football team consists of American football players from the Big East Conference who were chosen as the best at their respective positions during the 2006 NCAA Division I FBS football season. The official All-Big East teams in 2006 were chosen by votes of the conference's eight head football coaches. The coaches chose both first- and second-team players. Only two players were unanimously selected to the first team: West Virginia's senior safety Eric Wicks and Louisville's senior defensive defensive tackle Amobi Okoye. West Virginia quarterback Patrick White was chosen as the offensive player of the year, and Pittsburgh linebacker H. B. Blades was chosen as the defensive player of the year.

== Honorees by team ==
Louisville. The Louisville Cardinals won the Big East championship, compiled a 12–1 record, and placed six players on the first team: wide receiver Harry Douglas; offensive tackle Renardo Foster; offensive guard Kurt Quarterman; defensive tackle Amobi Okoye; cornerback William Gay; and kicker Art Carmody. Louisville placed another six players on the second team, including quarterback Brian Brohm.

West Virginia. The West Virginia Mountaineers finished second in the Big East with an 11–2 record. The Mountaineers were led by sophomore quarterback Patrick White who won first-team honors and was selected as the Big East offensive player of the year. For the 2006 season, White completed 109 of 164 passes (66.5%) for 1,524 yards and 11 touchdowns and rushed for 1,074 yards and 17 touchdowns. He was the first Big East player to gain over 1,000 yards by way of both passing and rushing in the same season. White was the second West Virginia quarterback in three years to win all-conference honors, following Rasheed Marshall in 2004. A total of six West Virginia players were named to the first team: White; running back Steve Slaton; offensive guard Jeremy Sheffey; center Dan Mozes; defensive lineman Keilen Dykes; and safety Eric Wicks.

Rutgers. Rutgers finished in third place in the Big East with an 11–2 record, and its head coach Greg Schiano was selected as the Big East coach of the year. He led Rutgers to a 10-2record, the program's first 10-win season since 1976. Five Rutgers players received first team honors: running back Ray Rice; tight end Clark Harris; offensive tackle Jeremy Zuttah; defensive tackle Eric Foster; and punter Joe Radigan.

South Florida. The South Florida Bulls tied for fourth place and compiled a 9–4 record. Senior wide receiver and punt returner Ean Randolph was selected as the conference's special teams player of the year. Randolph led the conference with an average of 14.7 yards per punt return. He returned 22 punts for 323 yards and one touchdown. Freshman quarterback Matt Grothe was selected as the Big East rookie of the year. Grothe completed 196 of 307 passes for 2,495 yards and 14 touchdowns and rushed for 607 yards and nine touchdowns. South Florida's other first-team honorees were linebacker Stephen Nicholas and cornerback Trae Williams.

Cincinnati. The Cincinnati Bearcats tied for fourth in the Big East. Three Cincinnati players, all defenders, won first-team honors: defensive tackle Terrill Byrd; middle linebacker Kevin McCullough; and safety Dominic Ross. Three others, including tight end Brent Celek, were named to the second team.

Pittsburgh. Pittsburgh finished sixth in the Big East. Senior linebacker H. B. Blades was selected as the Big East defensive player of the year. He led the Big East, and ranked third nationally, with 147 tackles. In addition to Blades, Pitt's only other first-team honoree was wide receiver Derek Kinder.

Syracuse and Connecticut. Syracuse and Connecticut tied for last place in the conference with identical records of 4–8 (1–6 in conference games). Neither placced any players on the first team. Syracuse placed three defenders on the second team, and Connecticut placed two players, including running back Donald Brown, on the second team.

== Offensive selections ==
=== Quarterbacks ===
- Patrick White, West Virginia (Coaches-1)
- Brian Brohm, Louisville (Coaches-2)

=== Running backs ===
- Ray Rice, Rutgers (Coaches-1)
- Steve Slaton, West Virginia (Coaches-1)
- Donald Brown, UConn (Coaches-2)
- Brian Leonard, Rutgers (Coaches-2)

=== Wide receivers ===
- Harry Douglas, Louisville (Coaches-1)
- Derek Kinder, Pitt (Coaches-1)
- Mario Urrutia, Louisville (Coaches-2)
- Darius Reynaud, West Virginia (Coaches-2)

=== Tight ends ===
- Clark Harris, Rutgers (Coaches-1)
- Brent Celek, Cincinnati (Coaches-2)

=== Offensive tackles ===
- Renardo Foster, Louisville (Coaches-1)
- Jeremy Zuttah, Rutgers (Coaches-1)
- Pedro Sosa, Rutgers (Coaches-2)
- Ryan Stanchek, West Virginia (Coaches-2)

=== Offensive guard ===
- Kurt Quarterman, Louisville (Coaches-1)
- Jeremy Sheffey, West Virginia (Coaches-1)
- Trevor Canfield, Cincinnati (Coaches-2)
- Cameron Stephenson, Rutgers (Coaches-2)

=== Centers ===
- Dan Mozes, West Virginia (Coaches-1)
- Eric Wood, Louisville (Coaches-2)

== Defensive selections ==
=== Defensive line ===
- Terrill Byrd, Cincinnati (Coaches-1)
- Amobi Okoye, Louisville (Coaches-1)
- Eric Foster, Rutgers (Coaches-1)
- Keilen Dykes, West Virginia (Coaches-1)
- Rhema Fuller, UConn (Coaches-2)
- Joe Clermond, Pitt (Coaches-2)
- Ramel Meekins, Rutgers (Coaches-2)
- Jamaal Westerman, Rutgers (Coaches-2)
- Jameel McClain, Syracuse (Coaches-2)

=== Linebackers ===
- Kevin McCullough, Cincinnati (Coaches-1)
- H. B. Blades, Pitt (Coaches-1)
- Stephen Nicholas, South Florida (Coaches-1)
- Malik Jackson, Louisville (Coaches-2)
- Devraun Thompson, Rutgers (Coaches-2)
- Kelvin Smith, Syracuse (Coaches-2)

=== Cornerbacks ===
- William Gay, Louisville (Coaches-1)
- Darrelle Revis, Pitt (Coaches-1)
- Trae Williams, South Florida (Coaches-1)
- Mike Mickens, Cincinnati (Coaches-2)
- Tanard Jackson, Syracuse (Coaches-2)

=== Safeties ===
- Dominic Ross, Cincinnati (Coaches-1)
- Eric Wicks, West Virginia (Coaches-1)
- Brandon Sharp, Louisville (Coaches-2)
- Ron Girault, Rutgers (Coaches-2)
- Courtney Greene, Rutgers (Coaches-2)

== Special teams ==
=== Kickers ===
- Art Carmody, Louisville (Coaches-1)
- Jeremy Ito, Rutgers (Coaches-2)

=== Punters ===
- Joe Radigan, Rutgers (Coaches-1)
- Adam Graessle, Pitt (Coaches-2)

=== Return specialist ===
- Ean Randolph, South Florida (Coaches-1)
- Vaughn Rivers, West Virginia (Coaches-2)

== Individual awards ==
- Offensive player of the year - Patrick White, quarterback, West Virginia
- Defensive player of the year - H. B. Blades, linebacker, Pitt
- Special teams player of the year - Ean Randolph, South Florida
- Rookie of the year - Matt Grothe, quarterback, South Florida
- Coach of the year - Greg Schiano

== Key ==
Coaches, selected by the conference coaches

== See also ==
- 2006 All-America college football team
