= 2005 All-Big East Conference football team =

American college football all-star team

The 2005 All-Big East Conference football team consists of American football players from the Big East Conference who were chosen as the best at their respective positions during the 2005 NCAA Division I-A football season. The organizations selecting All-Big East teams in 2005 included the conference's head football coaches. The coaches chose both first- and second-team players.

== Offensive selections ==
=== Quarterbacks ===
- Brian Brohm, Louisville (Coaches-1)
- Tyler Palko, Pitt (Coaches-2)

=== Running backs ===
- Michael Bush, Louisville (Coaches-1)
- Andre Hall, South Florida (Coaches-1)
- Brian Leonard, Rutgers (Coaches-2)
- Steve Slaton, West Virginia (Coaches-2)

=== Wide receivers ===
- Joshua Tinch, Louisville (Coaches-1)
- Greg Lee, Pitt (Coaches-1)
- Mario Urrutia, Louisville (Coaches-2)
- Tres Moses, Rutgers (Coaches-2)

=== Tight ends ===
- Clark Harris, Rutgers (Coaches-1)
- Dan Murray, UConn (Coaches-1)

=== Offensive tackles ===
- Garin Justice, West Virginia (Coaches-1)
- Travis Leffew, Louisville (Coaches-1)
- Theodoric Watson, South Florida (Coaches-2)
- Charles Spencer, Pitt (Coaches-2)

=== Offensive guard ===
- John Glass, Rutgers (Coaches-1)
- Jason Spitz, Louisville (Coaches-1)
- Jeremy Sheffey, West Virginia (Coaches-2)
- Frank Davis, South Florida (Coaches-2)

=== Centers ===
- Dan Mozes, West Virginia (Coaches-1)
- John Miller, South Florida (Coaches-2)

== Defensive selections ==
=== Defensive line ===
- Elvis Dumervil, Louisville (Coaches-1)
- Ryan Neill, Rutgers (Coaches-1)
- Ryan LaCasse, Syracuse (Coaches-1)
- Ernest Hunter, West Virginia(Coaches-1)
- Rhema Fuller, UConn (Coaches-2)
- Deon McPhee, UConn (Coaches-2)
- Montavious Stanley, Louisville (Coaches-2)
- Terrence Royal, South Florida (Coaches-2)

=== Linebackers ===
- James Hargrave, UConn (Coaches-1)
- H. B. Blades, Pitt (Coaches-1)
- Kevin McLee, West Virginia (Coaches-1)
- Corey Smith, Cincinnati (Coaches-2)
- Brandon Johnson, Louisville (Coaches-2)
- Stephen Nicholas, South Florida (Coaches-2)

=== Cornerbacks ===
- Bernard Lay, Pitt (Coaches-1)
- Darrelle Revis, Pitt (Coaches-1)
- Mike Mickens, Cincinnati (Coaches-2)
- Mike Jenkins, South Florida (Coaches-2)
- Anthony Mims, West Virginia (Coaches-2)

=== Safeties ===
- Anthony Smith, Syracuse (Coaches-1)
- Jahmile Addae, West Virginia (Coaches-1)
- Tez Morris, Pitt (Coaches-2)
- Johnnie Jones, South Florida (Coaches-2)
- Eric Wicks, West Virginia (Coaches-2)

== Special teams ==
=== Kickers ===
- Art Carmody, Louisville (Coaches-1)
- Josh Cummings, Pitt (Coaches-2)

=== Punters ===
- Brendan Carney, Syracuse (Coaches-1)
- Phil Brady, West Virginia (Coaches-2)

=== Return specialist ===
- Willie Foster, Rutgers (Coaches-1)
- Antonio Lewis, West Virginia (Coaches-2)

== Individual awards ==
- Offensive player of the year - Brian Brohm, Louisville
- Defensive player of the year - Elvis Dumervil, Louisville
- Special teams player of the year - Willie Foster, Rutgers
- Rookie of the year - Steve Slaton, West Virginia
- Coach of the year - Rich Rodriguez, West Virginia

== Key ==
Coaches, selected by the conference coaches

== See also ==
- 2005 All-America college football team
