= Keilen Dykes =

American football player (born 1984)

No. 94
- Position: Defensive end

Personal information
- Born: September 6, 1984 (age 42); Youngstown, Ohio, U.S.
- Listed height: 6 ft 3 in (1.91 m)
- Listed weight: 305 lb (138 kg)

Career information
- High school: Chaney (Youngstown)
- College: West Virginia
- NFL draft: 2008: undrafted

Career history
- Arizona Cardinals (2008–2010)

Awards and highlights
- 2× First-team All-Big East (2006–2007)
- Stats at Pro Football Reference

Keilen Lee Dykes (born September 6, 1984) is an American former professional football player who was a defensive end in the National Football League (NFL). He played college football for the West Virginia Mountaineers and was signed as an undrafted free agent in 2008.

== Early life ==
As a senior in high school, Dykes earned All-Ohio, All-city, and All-NEO honors after recording 75 tackles and 9.5 sacks. He was also named the Youngstown Vindicator city defensive player of the year. Dykes had 18 sacks as a junior and was selected for the North-South and Big 33 Football Classic games, while attending Chaney High School.

== Collegiate career ==
Dykes did not play in 2003 after enrolling at West Virginia University, and then was redshirted by Rich Rodriguez.

In 2004, Dykes worked his way into the starting lineup as a redshirt freshman. He recorded 37 tackles, six for a loss, and had two sacks on the season. In 2005, he started all 13 games. He started the season off with three tackles against Syracuse and Wofford, followed by four tackles in the win against Maryland. He had three tackles, two for a loss, and a sack against East Carolina followed by four tackles, 2.5 for a loss, against Rutgers. He then had a pair of sacks in the UConn win, then two tackles against Cincinnati. He finished out the season with three tackles and a tackle for a loss against South Florida. As a junior in 2006, he led a strong Mountaineer rush defense with linebacker Boo McLee and safety Eric Wicks that played poorly on pass coverage during the second half of the season. Dykes had 32 tackles on the season, 5.5 tackles for a loss. He also had 3 sacks on the season. The rush defense, allowed just 93.3 rushing yards per game, but was not helped by a pass defense that let 243.3 passing yards get by per game with 17 passing touchdowns being scored on the defense. He was named First-team All-Big East at the end of the season, along with Wicks and McLee. Going into 2007, Dykes led a Mountaineers defense that was expected to improve dramatically with pass coverage, with the return of senior safety (Eric) Wicks and sophomore star safety Quinton Andrews. Dykes and Wicks were both selected a preseason First-team All-Big East selections, while Dykes was selected as the #7 defensive tackle in the nation by Lindy's and Wicks was selected as the #7 safety. In the second game of the season against Marshall, Dykes recorded 2.5 tackles against Rimington candidate Doug Legursky. Against Syracuse at the Carrier Dome, Dykes had an interception that he took 19 yards for a touchdown. It was the first time a defensive lineman had scored at West Virginia since 1981. In his final game as a Mountaineer, the 48-28 victory in the Fiesta Bowl against Oklahoma, he recorded one tackle. He finished the season with 23 tackles, one sack, one interception, one forced fumble, two fumble recoveries, and a defensive touchdown.

Dykes was named First-team All-Big East for the second consecutive season following the final regular season game and awarded the John Russell Award and Captain Award by head coach Rich Rodriguez. At the end of his career, Dykes was leading the Mountaineer team with 44 starts.

On January 19, 2008, Dykes played in the 2008 East-West Shrine Game.

== Professional career ==
=== Pre-draft ===
After graduating from West Virginia, Dykes entered the 2008 NFL draft. Scott Wright, of NFL Draft Countdown, projected Dykes as the 13th best defensive tackle in the class. On January 14, 2008, it was announced that he had signed with Huntington, West Virginia agent Dave Rich, who also signed Marshall center Doug Legursky and Louisville receiver Harry Douglas.

Dykes was not invited to the 2008 NFL Combine however, and said of it, "I was shocked...I believe they made a mistake. But I'm not going to let it get me down. I still have my pro day."

On March 17, four days after his pro day, Dykes met with the Pittsburgh Steelers, in Pittsburgh. In April, USA Today ranked him the #15 defensive tackle in the class and projected him as a fifth to sixth round selection. The report also expected him to earn a roster spot as a rookie due to his versatility and projected his best fit to be in a 3-4 defensive scheme.

=== Arizona Cardinals ===
After going undrafted in the 2008 NFL draft, Dykes signed with the Arizona Cardinals as a free agent. He was released after the preseason but then re-signed to the team's practice squad. On February 4, 2009, following the end of the season, Dykes was signed to a future contract with the Cardinals. He was waived on September 4, 2009.
