= 2006 West Virginia Mountaineers football team =

American college football season

2006 West Virginia Mountaineers football

Gator Bowl champion

Gator Bowl, W 38–35 vs. Georgia Tech
- Conference: Big East Conference

Ranking
- Coaches: No. 10
- AP: No. 10
- Record: 11–2 (5–2 Big East)
- Head coach: Rich Rodriguez (6th season)
- Offensive coordinator: Calvin Magee (3rd season)
- Offensive scheme: Spread option
- Defensive coordinator: Jeff Casteel (5th season)
- Base defense: 3–3–5
- Home stadium: Milan Puskar Stadium

2006 Big East Conference football standings
	Conf.			Overall
Team	W		L	W		L
No. 6 Louisville $	6	–	1	12	–	1
No. 10 West Virginia	5	–	2	11	–	2
No. 12 Rutgers	5	–	2	11	–	2
South Florida	4	–	3	9	–	4
Cincinnati	4	–	3	8	–	5
Pittsburgh	2	–	5	6	–	6
Connecticut	1	–	6	4	–	8
Syracuse	1	–	6	4	–	8
$ – BCS representative as conference champion; Rankings from AP Poll

The 2006 West Virginia Mountaineers football team represented West Virginia University as a member of the Big East Conference during the 2006 NCAA Division I FBS football season. Led by sixth-year head coach Rich Rodriguez, the Mountaineers compiled an overall record of 11–2 with a mark of 5–2 in conference play, tying for second place in the Big East. West Virginia was invited the Gator Bowl, where the Mountaineers defeated Georgia Tech. The team played home games at Milan Puskar Stadium in Morgantown, West Virginia.

== Schedule ==
Date	Time	Opponent	Rank	Site	TV	Result	Attendance	Source
September 2	3:30 p.m.	Marshall*	No. 5	Milan Puskar Stadium; Morgantown, WV (Friends of Coal Bowl)	ESPN Plus	W 42–10	61,077	
September 9	1:00 p.m.	Eastern Washington*	No. 6	Mountaineer Field; Milan Puskar Stadium		W 52–3	59,504	
September 14	7:45 p.m.	Maryland*	No. 5	Milan Puskar Stadium; Morgantown, WV	ESPN	W 45–24	60,513	
September 23	4:30 p.m.	at East Carolina*	No. 4	Dowdy–Ficklen Stadium; Greenville, NC	ESPN2	W 27–10	40,510	
October 7	2:30 p.m.	at Mississippi State*	No. 4	Davis Wade Stadium; Starkville, MS	PPV	W 42–14	40,327	
October 14	12:00 p.m.	Syracuse^{†}	No. 5	Milan Puskar Stadium; Morgantown, WV (rivalry)	ESPN Plus	W 41–17	60,051	
October 20	8:00 p.m.	at Connecticut	No. 4	Rentschler Field; East Hartford, CT	ESPN	W 37–11	40,000	
November 2	7:30 p.m.	at No. 5 Louisville	No. 3	Papa John's Cardinal Stadium; Louisville, KY	ESPN	L 34–44	43,217	
November 11	12:00 p.m.	Cincinnati	No. 10	Milan Puskar Stadium; Morgantown, WV	ESPN2	W 42–24	57,174	
November 16	7:45 p.m.	at Pittsburgh	No. 8	Heinz Field; Pittsburgh, PA (Backyard Brawl)	ESPN	W 45–27	55,642	
November 25	12:00 p.m.	South Florida	No. 7	Milan Puskar Stadium; Morgantown, WV	ESPN2	L 19–24	52,790	
December 2	7:45 p.m.	No. 13 Rutgers	No. 15	Milan Puskar Stadium; Morgantown, WV	ESPN	W 41–39 ^{3OT}	60,299	
January 1	12:00 p.m.	vs. Georgia Tech*	No. 13	Alltel Stadium; Jacksonville, FL (Gator Bowl)	CBS	W 38–35	67,714	
*Non-conference game; ^{†}Homecoming; Rankings from AP Poll released prior to the game; All times are in Eastern time

== Rankings ==
Ranking movements Legend: ██ Increase in ranking ██ Decrease in ranking
	Week															
Poll	Pre	1	2	3	4	5	6	7	8	9	10	11	12	13	14	Final
AP	5	6	5	4	4	4	5	4	4	3	10	8	7	15	13	10
Coaches	7	5	5	4	4	4	4	4	4	3	10	7	7	15	12	10
Harris	Not released				4	5	5	4	4	3	10	8	7	15	12	Not released
BCS	Not released							5	4	3	10	8	7	15	13	Not released

== Game summaries ==
=== Marshall ===
	1	2	3	4	Total
Marshall	0	7	3	0	10
#7 West Virginia	14	14	7	7	42

Steve Slaton's sophomore season started the same way he ended last year—with a big performance. Slaton ran for 203 yards and scored two touchdowns to lead No. 5 West Virginia past Marshall 42–10. Slaton, the nation's top freshman in 2005 with 19 rushing TDs, had his second straight 200-yard game. Slaton tore up Marshall (0–1) in just the second meeting between the state's two Division I-A schools since 1923. Slaton's 33 carries were one shy of a career-high and Slaton surpassed 100 yards early in the second quarter and had 140 by halftime. He had a 14-yard TD run around right end midway through the first quarter and scored untouched from 16 yards out after making a hard cut to the right late in the half for a 28–7 lead. Slaton also had a 10-yard TD run negated by a holding penalty in the second quarter. West Virginia (1–0), which is 6–0 all-time against Marshall, scored on four of its first five possessions and totaled 312 rushing yards. Pat White completed 10-of-14 passes for 168 yards. He found Brandon Myles with first-half TD tosses of 8 and 18 yards as West Virginia built a 21–0 lead. It was the first career multiple TD game for Myles, a senior. Marshall, limited to just seven first downs in the first half, went to its passing game late in the second quarter for its only touchdown. Freshman tight end Cody Slate caught passes of 26 and 14 yards to give Marshall its best field position at the WVU 25. Matt Morris then made up for a dropped pass in the end zone earlier in the game by grabbing a 21-yard TD toss from Bernard Morris. The pass initially was ruled incomplete but Marshall challenged and the play was overturned for a touchdown. West Virginia fullback Owen Schmitt scored on a 3-yard run midway through the third quarter to cap a 66-yard drive that was set up by an interception by freshman Quinton Andrews. WVU backup quarterback Jarrett Brown closed the scoring on a 7-yard TD run with 1:13 left in the game.

=== Eastern Washington ===
	1	2	3	4	Total
Eastern Washington	0	3	0	0	3
#5 West Virginia	14	14	10	14	52

Steve Slaton ran for 105 yards and two first-quarter scores and called it a day as No. 6 West Virginia went to its bench often in a 52–3 win over Division I-AA Eastern Washington. Pat White directed a second-quarter touchdown drive before the QB parade began. Jarrett Brown threw for a TD and ran for another, while Nate Sowers and Markell Harrison also ran for scores. By the time West Virginia (2–0) built a 21–3 lead early in the second quarter, Slaton and White were done for the day. Slaton followed up a 31-carry, 203-yard effort against Marshall with just eight carries Saturday, the fewest since he had 11 against Virginia Tech as a freshman.. West Virginia beat the Eagles by outgaining them 591–185, including 394 on the ground. Slaton needed just two carries for his first score and he went untouched on TD runs of 49 and 17 yards. He went to the bench afterward and didn't return, removing his uniform after halftime. White soon followed. On West Virginia's third series, he drove the Mountaineers 65 yards with Owen Schmitt covering the final 7 for a score. Jarrett Brown threw a 5-yard TD pass to Brandon Myles just before halftime and scored on a 7-yard run to start the second half for a 35–3 lead. Sowers and Harrison added TD runs of 8 and 1 yards, respectively, in the fourth quarter. The crowd of 59,504 was the largest ever to see Eastern Washington play, topping a 2002 game at Arizona State by more than 20,000.

=== Maryland ===
	1	2	3	4	Total
Maryland	0	10	7	7	24
#5 West Virginia	28	10	7	0	45

Steve Slaton rushed for 167 of his 195 yards in the first half, and the Mountaineers forced two turnovers in a 28–0 first-quarter blitz on their way to a 45–24 victory over Maryland. He scored twice in the opening quarter of his first game against Maryland, the school that offered him a scholarship, then withdrew it because they felt they had enough running backs. He had 149 yards against the Terrapins in the first quarter, when West Virginia scored on all four possessions. Slaton had early TD runs of 38 and 37 yards. Pat White threw for a TD and ran for another while Darius Reynaud scored twice, including a 96-yard kickoff return, for the Mountaineers (3–0), who extended their winning streak to 10 games, second in the nation to TCU's 12 in a row. With scouts from 15 NFL teams in attendance, West Virginia took a 38–10 halftime lead in beating Maryland (2–1) for the third straight year, the first time that has happened since 1996–98. The teams have met every year since 1980. Maryland, which had wins over Division I-AA William & Mary and unheralded Middle Tennessee State, watched as the Mountaineers compiled more than 300 yards rushing for the third straight game. West Virginia's young defense, pressed to force more turnovers, also delivered, finishing with five takeaways. Maryland's Sam Hollenbach was intercepted twice and the Terrapins fumbled the ball away three times, twice by Josh Wilson on kickoffs. After Slaton's early TD runs, a fumble recovery on a kickoff set up Reynaud's 5-yard scoring catch from White and Jay Henry's interception led to another first-quarter score for West Virginia. Lance Ball's 11-yard TD run early in the third quarter pulled Maryland within 38–17, but the Terrapins got no closer.

=== East Carolina ===
	1	2	3	4	Total
#4 West Virginia	7	7	3	10	27
East Carolina	7	0	0	3	10

Patrick White and Steve Slaton tore up their third opponent of the season in a row. White threw for a personal-best 216 yards and two touchdowns and ran for another score, and the No. 4 Mountaineers overcame Slaton's least-productive game of the season and pulled away late in a 27–10 victory over ECU. White was 17-of-24 passing with touchdown passes of 3 yards to Owen Schmitt and 60 yards to Darius Reynaud. The Mountaineers (4–0) shook off some sloppy play—including White's three interceptions—to win their 11th straight game. The Pirates held Slaton, who entered as the nation's third-leading rusher, to 80 yards—less than half of his 168-yard average—and afterward he said he was bothered by cramps blamed on the hot, humid weather. West Virginia led just 17–10 early in the fourth quarter when White flipped a pass to Reynaud, who zigzagged 60 yards back across the field and through the Pirates' defense for the clinching touchdown. Reynaud finished with five catches for 110 yards and became the first West Virginia player with more than 100 yards receiving since November 2004, when Chris Henry had 118 against Boston College. The Mountaineers had just 153 yards rushing though–197 fewer than its nation-leading average of 350; a year ago, East Carolina held West Virginia to just 127 yards rushing. James Pinkney was 20-of-40 for 247 yards with a touchdown for the Pirates (1–3), and Aundrae Allison had four catches for 54 yards and a touchdown. But East Carolina couldn't get its ground game going, either—Brandon Fractious led the Pirates with 13 yards rushing, and the Pirates finished with 41 yards on the ground. West Virginia dominated the first half, holding three-touchdown underdog East Carolina to 2 yards rushing and gaining 221 yards to the Pirates' 87, but led just 14–7 at halftime largely because of two interceptions thrown by White in the end zone. White capped West Virginia's opening drive with a 5-yard touchdown run, then flipped his scoring pass to Schmitt early in the second quarter to snap a 7-all tie. Pinkney found his favorite target—Allison—behind the West Virginia defense for a 47-yard touchdown pass midway through the first, tying it 7–7. The Pirates closed to seven points early in the fourth on Robert Lee's 27-yard field goal.

=== Mississippi State ===
	1	2	3	4	Total
#4 West Virginia	7	7	7	21	42
Mississippi State	0	7	0	7	14

West Virginia committed 11 penalties and allowed a moribund Mississippi State offense to threaten several times in West Virginia's 42–14 win. Steve Slaton bailed out the Mountaineers (5–0) with 185 yards and a touchdown and Pat White rushed for two scores as West Virginia pulled away late to extend the nation's second-longest winning streak to 12 games. But the defense needed two late interceptions deep in Mountaineers territory to secure the win as West Virginia kept three drives by Mississippi State (1–5) alive with penalties. In all, the Mountaineers were flagged for 132 yards. However, the trio of White, Slaton and fullback Owen Schmitt got to work. White and Schmitt scored two touchdowns apiece and Slaton constantly stung what had been considered a stout Bulldogs rush defense with nine runs of 10 yards or more. The Mountaineers gained 406 total yards, including 314 on the ground. White added 76 rushing yards that included a game-clinching 46-yard run midway through the fourth quarter. But Mississippi State finished with an advantage of 7:30 in time of possession, keeping that high-powered rushing game on the bench. Schmitt capped the first with a 5-yard TD dive at 8:11, giving West Virginia a touchdown on its first drive in seven consecutive games. White capped the Mountaineers' second drive with another 5-yard run to make it 14–0 with 14:12 remaining in the second quarter. Mississippi State had no answer for West Virginia's blitz early in the game. But crucial penalties such as roughing the punter and roughing the passer kept the Bulldogs alive and quarterback Omarr Conner got them moving late in the first half with a pair of long passes to Tony Burks. A 45-yarder to Burks pushed Mississippi State deep into West Virginia territory. A 40-yarder to Burks got the Bulldogs to the 2. But he fumbled into the end zone where Lance Long picked it up for the score at 1:01 to cut West Virginia's halftime lead to 14–7. The Mountaineers opened the second half with a commitment to Slaton, who carried the ball five times and capped a 10-play scoring drive with a 10-yard touchdown that made it 21–7 with 10:22 left in the third quarter. Conner was injured late in the third quarter and replaced by Michael Henig, the team's original starter before he broke his collarbone in the season opener. Henig directed two crisp drives but was picked off in the end zone by Eric Wicks and at the 10 by Bobby Hathaway. After the second interception, White scored his second touchdown on a slithering run that put the Mountaineers up 28–7 with 8:02 left. The Bulldogs did manage a late score on a 1-yard dive by Anthony Dixon with 5:31 remaining in the game, but the Mountaineers answered with a long drive and Schmitt's second touchdown from 5 yards out to make it 35–14.

=== Syracuse ===
	1	2	3	4	Total
Syracuse	7	7	0	3	17
#4 West Virginia	7	10	21	3	41

Pat White, the West Virginia quarterback, ran for a career-high 247 yards and four touchdowns as the fifth-ranked Mountaineers defeated Syracuse 41–17. Steve Slaton, who's been the main focus of West Virginia's Heisman hype, was no slouch either. He ran for 163 yards and a touchdown as the Mountaineers (6–0, 1–0 Big East) extended their winning streak to 13 games, matching the school record set in 1952–1953. But White was the star against Syracuse. On 15 carries, he broke his own Big East and school records for rushing by a quarterback and nearly doubled his output for the season. He had 220 yards last year against Pitt. It was the fourth best effort by any back in school history. White scored three times early in the second half to break the game open. Syracuse (3–4, 0–2) trailed 17–14 at halftime but managed only a field goal after that in losing its ninth straight Big East game. West Virginia, the nation's second-best rushing offense, compiled a season-high 457 yards on the ground, the most since a 478-yard effort against ECU in 2004. White, who entered the game with 270 rushing yards for the season, had a 69-yard TD run on West Virginia's opening series of the game. His TD runs of 40, 32 and 12 yards on WVU's first three series of the second half put the Mountaineers ahead 38–14 late in the third quarter. White (105 yards) and Slaton (101) became the first backs to surpass 100 yards against the Orange in the first half since Miami's Frank Gore and Clinton Portis in 2001. White and Slaton also surpassed 100 yards in the same game last year against Pittsburgh. Perry Patterson's 47-yard TD pass to Mike Williams over three defenders on the game's opening drive marked the first time West Virginia trailed in a game since Oct. 15, 2005, against Louisville. Slaton ran 52 yards around right end to put the Mountaineers ahead 17–7 midway through the second quarter. Patterson, who finished 9-of-21 for 146 yards, then found Williams behind the defense again for a 30-yard gain to the West Virginia 16, setting up Patterson's 3-yard TD run on third down late in the first half. The Mountaineers' fifth-straight win over Syracuse is their longest in the 54-game series dating to 1945.

=== Connecticut ===
	1	2	3	4	Total
#4 West Virginia	3	17	10	7	37
Connecticut	0	3	0	8	11

Pat White and the West Virginia Mountaineers ran past UConn to push their winning streak to 14 games. White ran for 102 yards and a touchdown and threw a scoring pass and Steve Slaton rushed for 128 yards rushing to help No. 4 West Virginia beat Connecticut 37–11 in the Mountaineers' final tuneup before their showdown with sixth-ranked Louisville. White led West Virginia (7–0, 2–0 Big East) on two one-play drives, running 45 yards for a touchdown in the second quarter, and throwing a 52-yard scoring pass to Rayshawn Bolden in the third. White, who had 15 carries, was 9-of-14 for 156 yards, with one interception. Steve Slaton scored on a 56-yard run with 5:26 left. Pat McAfee added three field goals, including a career-long 48-yarder, as West Virginia tied Ohio State for the longest winning streak in the nation. UConn (3–4, 0–2), which started six freshmen, including three on the offensive line, trailed 6–3 midway through the second quarter. But a holding penalty and a 30-yard punt into a stiff wind gave West Virginia the ball on the UConn 45. On the next play, White kept the ball on an option and sprinted up the middle of the field for a touchdown. White had a 30-yard scamper on the Mountaineers' next drive, which went 74 yards in 11 plays. Owen Schmitt ran the ball in from a yard out with 20 seconds left in the half to give the Mountaineers a 20–3 lead. Connecticut's Matt Bonislawski completed eight of 20 passes for 58 yards and an interception. He was replaced late in the third quarter by sophomore D.J. Hernandez, who scored the Huskies' touchdown on a 5-yard run with 7:22 left in the game. Terry Caulley ran for the two-point conversion. Caulley, who came into the game averaging 98 yards per game on the ground, ran for 35 yards on 13 carries. Tony Ciaravino, the third kicker the Huskies have used this season, hit a 29-yard field goal to tie it 3–3. That score capped a 15-play, 60-yard drive that used up 5:46.

=== Louisville ===
	1	2	3	4	Total
#3 West Virginia	7	7	7	13	34
#5 Louisville	3	13	14	14	44

The #5 ranked Cardinals beat West Virginia 44–34 and jumped into the National Title hunt. Louisville (8–0, 3–0) snapped West Virginia's (7–1, 2–1) 14-game win streak and moved into a first-place tie with idle Rutgers in Big East Conference play. It was also the first time Louisville won against a top 3 team in school history. Brohm threw for 354 yards and a touchdown, and the Cardinals took advantage of key mistakes by West Virginia to earn a signature win under coach Bobby Petrino and stake their claim as a serious contender for the Bowl Championship Series title game. West Virginia quarterback Pat White ran for 125 yards and four touchdowns and added 222 yards through the air. But he couldn't overcome three WVU turnovers and a relentless Louisville offense that racked up 468 total yards and kept the Mountaineers on their heels all night. The Cardinals avenged 2005's triple-overtime loss to West Virginia (7–1, 2–1) by returning a fumble and a punt for touchdowns during a pivotal three-minute stretch in the third quarter. Then, they delivered on their offseason motto to "finish", born during last year's loss to the Mountaineers, a game Louisville led by 17 in the fourth quarter. Heisman Trophy hopeful Steve Slaton ran for 156 yards and a touchdown for West Virginia, but fumbled on consecutive snaps in the third quarter—bothered by a broken left wrist. Trent Guy added a 40-yard punt return pushing Louisville's advantage to 30–16 with 9:23 left in the third. Though White led the Mountaineers on a pair of touchdown drives, the Cardinals responded each time with a score of their own. Brohm connected with Mario Urrutia on a 7-yard TD pass and Anthony Allen added a 5-yard touchdown run to keep the Cardinals safely in front. Set back by their mistakes, the Mountaineers couldn't keep pace as their school-record 14-game winning streak ended while a packed Papa John's Stadium crowd—clad mostly in black T-shirts that read "Beat WVU" – stormed the field. Urrutia finished with six catches for 113 yards and Harry Douglas caught six passes for 116 yards as Louisville seemingly did whatever it wanted on offense. The Cardinals punted just three times and scored on all but four of their possessions as they extended their home winning streak to 16 straight and beat West Virginia for the first time since 1990.

=== Cincinnati ===
	1	2	3	4	Total
Cincinnati	3	0	7	14	24
#10 West Virginia	0	21	21	0	42

Pat White ran for two touchdowns and threw another and Steve Slaton added two scoring runs as No. 10 West Virginia bounced back from its first loss with a 42–24 victory over Cincinnati. West Virginia (8–1, 3–1 Big East) overcame a sluggish start and scored five of its six TDs on drives of five plays or less. Slaton, who fumbled twice after injuring his elbow and wrist in the loss at Louisville, held onto the ball against the Bearcats. He ran for 148 yards on just 12 carries and had TD runs of 65 and 2 yards. West Virginia, the nation's second leading rushing offense, compiled 313 yards against Cincinnati, one of the best run defenses which had surrendered five TDs entering the game. Cincinnati (5–5, 2–3) lost to a ranked opponent on the road for the fourth time this season. Coach Mark Dantonio had compared West Virginia's offense to top-ranked Ohio State's. The Buckeyes beat the Bearcats 37–7 earlier this season. Cincinnati's Dustin Grutza completed 13 of 24 passes for 143 yards and was intercepted twice. Backup Nick Davila threw a pair of fourth-quarter TDs. Grutza took the Bearcats 75 yards early in the third quarter, hitting Derrick Stewart with a 45-yard TD pass to pull the Bearcats within 21–10. Slaton answered with a 63-yard run on the first play of the next series to the Cincinnati 2, and White finished off the drive with a keeper on the next snap, his 11th rushing TD in the last four games. White went 51 yards on a bootleg on the first play of West Virginia's next drive but fumbled at the Cincinnati 6. Rayshawn Bolden picked up the loose ball and stretched over the goal line for a TD. Quinton Andrews then returned an interception 20 yards to the Cincinnati 10, and Slaton scored from 3 yards out for a 42–10 lead late in the third. White, who rushed for 93 yards on 10 carries, scored from 3 yards out on the first series of the second quarter and lofted a pass that Brandon Myles caught in the left corner of the end zone four minutes later for a 34-yard TD. Slaton slipped through a crack on the right side and went 65 yards up the sideline for a score on the second play of West Virginia's next series. The 21 first-half points were the most allowed by Cincinnati all season.

=== Pittsburgh ===
	1	2	3	4	Total
#7 West Virginia	14	10	14	7	45
Pittsburgh	7	20	0	0	27

West Virginia's Pat White and Steve Slaton crossed up Pitt by teaming as a passing combination in a high-scoring first half, then put away the Panthers for the second season in a row with a string of long runs in a comeback second half to lead No. 8 West Virginia's 45–27. The Mountaineers (9–1, 4–1 Big East) beat their biggest rival for the fourth time in five seasons, though not quite as easily as in last year's 45–13 romp in Morgantown in which White and Slaton combined for 399 of West Virginia's 451 yards rushing. Pittsburgh (6–5, 2–4) led 27–24 at the half before being overwhelmed by West Virginia's playmaking speed in a scoreless second half in which the Mountaineers had 371 of their 438 yards rushing. West Virginia finished with a 641–295 edge in total yardage, outgaining Pitt 373–30 in the second half. White, the sophomore option quarterback whose quickness again was too much for Pitt to handle, threw for 204 yards and hit Slaton on the running back's first two touchdown receptions this season. White ran for touchdowns of 64 and 19 yards on the Mountaineers' first two possessions of the second half. He finished with 220 yards rushing against Pitt for the second season in a row as West Virginia's two stars again turned the rivalry very one-sided. Slaton, the nation's No. 2 rusher, was held to 7 yards on six carries in the first half, but still became the first player in school history to have more than 100 yards rushing (215) and receiving (130) in a game. He had scoring catches of 11 and 67 yards, as well as another 43-yard catch as a slot receiver, and touchdown runs of 15 and 55 yards. Pitt quarterback Tyler Palko tried to keep the Panthers in the game with two touchdown passes, but was sacked eight times and got nothing going in the second half. The 99th edition of the game now known as the Backyard Brawl kicked off one of college football's most awaited weekends. West Virginia's offense was everything it expected to be in the first half, except for its reliance on throwing rather than running. The major surprise was that Pitt, held to 10 points by Rutgers in its last home game, not only kept up but led 27–24 at halftime as Palko threw touchdown passes of 23 yards to Nate Byham and 15 yards to Oderick Turner. The play that Pitt fans will most remember is Darrelle Revis' adventuresome 73-yard punt return down the Panthers sideline that put Pitt up 24–17 with 2:18 remaining in the half. Revis took off after a thunderous block by wide receiver Derek Kinder so leveled West Virginia's Ridwan Malik that Malik took out one of his own teammates. The only problem was Revis' return left West Virginia with plenty enough time to score, with White hitting Slaton for 67 yards on their second pass play touchdown of the half. After West Virginia was held to 67 yards rushing in the first half, White got outside on the second play from scrimmage of the second half for a 64-yard scoring run that give the Mountaineers a 31–27 lead. On West Virginia's next possession, White needed only four plays to drive them 97 yards for a touchdown.

=== South Florida ===
	1	2	3	4	Total
South Florida	0	14	7	3	24
#7 West Virginia	0	6	6	7	19

The Bulls' defense scored on a fumble return and held the nation's second-best rushing and scoring offense to less than half of its averages in a 24–19 win over the No. 7 Mountaineers. Zip Goshboots ran for a touchdown and passed for another as USF (8–4, 4–3 Big East) handed West Virginia (9–2, 4–2) its first home loss in nine games—a loss that could end the Mountaineers' chances for a Bowl Championship Series bid. South Florida coach Jim Leavitt described it as a milestone in the school's 11-year football history, surpassing a win over Louisville last year. West Virginia fell into second place in the conference. Steve Slaton, the nation's No. 2 rusher, had his worst game as a starter. He saw his streak of six straight 100-yard games snapped, finishing with a season-low 43 yards, 115 below his average. The Mountaineers didn't score their first touchdown until midway through the third quarter and were limited to 132 yards rushing. Pat White threw two touchdown passes to Brandon Myles but the Mountaineers squandered several other scoring chances. They had scored touchdowns on 77 percent of their drives inside the 20 entering the game, yet failed to reach the end zone four times from the red zone against South Florida, including their first three drives. Slaton fumbled the ball away at the South Florida 1 on the first drive of the second half. West Virginia got the ball back at the South Florida 28 after a punt and White found a leaping Myles with a 15-yard TD pass in the left corner of the end zone. But White's conversion pass fell incomplete to make it 14–12. Grothe, the redshirt freshman, finished 21-of-29 for 270 yards and helped keep the Mountaineers' offense off the field. He took the Bulls 70 yards on the next series, finding Ean Randolph with a 21-yard TD pass late in the third. He later converted a pair of third-down passes to keep alive a 14-play drive that resulted in an 18-yard field goal by Delbert Alvarado midway through the fourth and a 24–12 lead. Pat White found Myles with a 44-yard scoring pass with 5:16 left to cut the deficit to 24–19. South Florida failed to get a first down on its next drive and West Virginia got the ball back at its 15. But a pass went off Myles' hands and Trae Williams intercepted the tipped ball for South Florida with 1:54 left. White finished 14-of-22 for 178 yards and ran for just 17 yards on 15 carries.

=== Rutgers ===
	1	2	3	4	OT	2OT	3OT	Total
#13 Rutgers	10	0	7	6	3	7	6	39
#15 West Virginia	3	3	14	3	3	7	8	41

No. 15 West Virginia knocked down Mike Teel's 2-point conversion pass in the end zone to preserve the Mountaineers' 41–39 triple-overtime win over No. 13 Rutgers, denying the Scarlet Knights their first BCS berth and handing Louisville the Big East's automatic bid as conference champion. Jarrett Brown ran for one touchdown and threw the go-ahead score in triple overtime to help West Virginia (10–2, 5–2 Big East) cap its second straight 10-win season. Brown started for Pat White, who missed the game because of a sore ankle. Brown, a sophomore, finished 14-of-29 for 244 yards in his first extensive play. The ending was a peculiar finish to an improbable regular season for Rutgers (10–2, 5–2). A loser for so long, the Scarlet Knights started 9–0 before being upset at Cincinnati, then rebounded by beating Syracuse to set the stage for what would have been a historic win against WVU. But while Rutgers produced its best season since going 11–0 in 1976, it wasn't enough to get the BCS berth the Scarlet Knights were hoping for. The Scarlet Knights dropped to 0–15 in Morgantown, dating to 1920. Starting with the third overtime, teams are required to go for 2-point conversions following touchdowns. Brown hit Brandon Myles across the middle from 22 yards out for the go-ahead score against No. 13 Rutgers (10–2, 5–2), then found Dorrell Jalloh with a 2-point pass for a 41–33 lead. Rutgers' Ray Rice then scored from 2 yards out. On the 2-point try, Teel scrambled to his right and threw toward Rice but Vaughn Rivers broke up the pass and several thousand fans in the sellout crowd ran onto the field in celebration. Rice carried 25 times for 129 yards, including 90 yards after halftime. Teel completed 19-of-26 passes for 278 yards and made West Virginia's secondary look susceptible for the second straight game.

=== Gator Bowl – Georgia Tech ===
	1	2	3	4	Total
#12 West Virginia	7	10	21	0	38
#25 Georgia Tech	14	14	7	0	35

Triple coverage even wasn't enough to stop Calvin Johnson. Johnson leapt between two West Virginia defenders and in front of a third for a 32-yard reception in the third quarter of the Gator Bowl, one of his nine catches for 186 yards and two touchdowns in Georgia Tech's 38–35 loss. The All-American junior made the Mountaineers' secondary look helpless all day in what was his collegiate finale. Johnson was considering forgoing his senior year for the NFL, and the 6-foot-5 wideout ended up making the transition. Johnson's yardage total put him fifth in the Gator Bowl record book—and in pretty good company. He finished behind Andre Rison, Javon Walker and Fred Biletnikoff and in front of Marvin Harrison. Johnson won the Biletnikoff Award this year as the nation's top receiver and was named the Atlantic Coast Conference player of the year. Before the bowl game, he had 1,016 yards receiving and 13 touchdowns, fourth-best in the country. West Virginia started the game with a 52-yard run by Owen Schmitt, who ended the drive with a 1-yard run. A TD pass from Taylor Bennett to Johnson and a run by Tashard Choice put the Yellowjackets up 14–7 at the end of the first. With Steve Slaton injured, Owen Schmitt had to fill in for the whole game. Johnson caught another TD pass at the start of the second to make it 21–7 GT. After a WVU FG and a James Johnson TD catch from Bennett, the Mountaineers were down 28–10. But Schmitt ended the second quarter with an 11-yard run to make it 28–17 at halftime. Choice started the third quarter with a five-yard TD run to make it 35–17. Then the Mountaineers, led by Pat White, came back from the 18-point deficit to win the game. A 57-yard pass on a "sleeper" play from White to Tito Gonzales and a 14-yard pass to Brandon Myles in the third quarter made the score 35–31. The "sleeper" play was named so because after an offsides call on the defense was called after the ball had been snapped, the offensive line stayed still after the ball was snapped, while White rolled out and fired to Gonzales who was wide-open. White ended up getting a 15-yard touchdown run at the end of the third, which determined the win 38–35 in the Mountaineers' biggest bowl comeback win in school history. WVU finished the season 11–2 (6–2) and ranked 10th in both polls.
