= 2007 All-Big East Conference football team =

American college football all-star team

The 2007 All-Big East Conference football team consists of American football players from the Big East Conference who were chosen as the best at their respective positions during the 2007 NCAA Division I FBS football season. The official All-Big East teams in 2007 were chosen by votes of the conference's head football coaches. The coaches chose both first- and second-team players. West Virginia quarterback Patrick White was chosen as the offensive player of the year for the second consecutive year, and South Florida defensive end George Selvie was chosen as the defensive player of the year.

== Honorees by team ==
West Virginia. The West Virginia Mountaineers tied for the Big East championship and were ranked No. 6 in the final AP poll. Three West Virginia players were included on the All-Big East first team: quarterback Patrick White; offensive guard Greg Isdaner; and defensive lineman Kellen Dykes. White was selected as the Big East offensive player of the year.

Connecticut. The Connecticut Huskies tied for the Big East championship but were unranked in the AP poll. They placed two players on the All-Big East first team: linebacker Danny Lansanah and offensive guard Donald Thomas.

Cincinnati. The Cincinnati Bearcats compiled a 10–3 record and were ranked No. 17 in the final AP poll. Four Cincinnati players were named to the first team: defensive lineman Terrill Byrd; cornerback Mike Mickens; safety Haruki Nakamura; and punter Kevin Huber. Huber was selected as the Big East special teams player of the year. Head coach Brian Kelly was selected as the Big East coach of the year.

South Florida. The South Florida Bulls tied with Cincinnati for third place in the Big East. They placed three players on the first team: defensive end George Selvie; linebacker Ben Moffitt; and cornerback Mike Jenkins. Selvie was also selected as the Big East defensive player of the year.

Rutgers. The Rutgers Scarlet Knights tied for fifth place and compiled an 8–5 record. Four Rutgers players were named to the first team: running back Ray Rice; wide receiver Tiquan Underwood; offensive tackle and team captain Jeremy Zuttah; and defensive tackle Eric Foster. Rice led the Big East with 1,956 all-purpose yards, 1,732 rushing yards, and 20 touchdowns. Underwood tallied 1,028 receiving yards. Three other Rutgers players were named to the second team.

Louisville. The Louisville Cardinals tied for fifth place and compiled a 6–6 record. They placed four players on the first team: wide receiver Harry Douglas; tight end Gary Barnidge; center Eric Wood; and kicker Art Carmody. Three others, including quarterback Brian Brohm, were named to the second team.

Pittsburgh. The Pittsburgh Panthers placed four on the first team: running back LeSean McCoy; offensive tackle Jeff Otah; linebacker Scott McKillop; and safety Eric Wicks. McCoy, who tallied 1,328 rushing yards, 244 receiving yards, and 15 touchdowns, was also named the Big East rookie of the year.

Syracuse. The Syracuse Orange finished last in the Big East and compiled a 2–10 record. Freshman return specialist and running back Max Suter, who led the Orange with 1,337 all-purpose yards, was the only Syracuse player named to the first team.

== Offensive selections ==
=== Quarterbacks ===
- Patrick White, West Virginia (Coaches-1)
- Brian Brohm, Louisville (Coaches-2)

=== Running backs ===
- Ray Rice, Rutgers (Coaches-1)
- LeSean McCoy, Pitt (Coaches-1)
- Andre Dixon, UConn (Coaches-2)
- Steve Slaton, West Virginia (Coaches-2)

=== Wide receivers ===
- Harry Douglas, Louisville (Coaches-1)
- Tiquan Underwood, Rutgers (Coaches-1)
- Marcus Bennett, Cincinnati (Coaches-2)
- Kenny Britt, Rutgers (Coaches-2)
- Mike Williams, Syracuse (Coaches-2)
- Darius Reynaud, West Virginia (Coaches-2)

=== Tight ends ===
- Gary Barnidge, Louisville (Coaches-1)

=== Offensive tackles ===
- Jeff Otah, Pitt (Coaches-1)
- Jeremy Zuttah, Rutgers (Coaches-1)
- George Bussey, Louisville (Coaches-2)
- Pedro Sosa, Rutgers (Coaches-2)

=== Offensive guard ===
- Donald Thomas, UConn (Coaches-1)
- Greg Isdaner, West Virginia (Coaches-1)
- Trevor Canfield, Cincinnati (Coaches-2)
- Ryan Schmidt, South Florida (Coaches-2)

=== Centers ===
- Eric Wood, Louisville (Coaches-1)
- Mike Dent, West Virginia (Coaches-2)

== Defensive selections ==
=== Defensive line ===
- Terrill Byrd, Cincinnati (Coaches-1)
- Eric Foster, Rutgers (Coaches-1)
- George Selvie, South Florida (Coaches-1)
- Keilen Dykes, West Virginia (Coaches-1)
- Anthony Hoke, Cincinnati (Coaches-2)
- Joe Clermond, Pitt (Coaches-2)
- Arthur Jones, Syracuse (Coaches-2)
- Johnny Dingle, West Virginia (Coaches-2)

=== Linebackers ===
- Danny Lansanah, UConn (Coaches-1)
- Scott McKillop, Pitt (Coaches-1)
- Ben Moffitt, South Florida (Coaches-1)
- Lamar Myles, Louisville (Coaches-2)
- Tyrone McKenzie, South Florida (Coaches-2)
- Marc Magro, West Virginia (Coaches-2)

=== Cornerbacks ===
- Mike Mickens, Cincinnati (Coaches-1)
- Mike Jenkins, South Florida (Coaches-1)
- DeAngelo Smith, Cincinnati (Coaches-2)
- Trae Williams, South Florida (Coaches-2)

=== Safeties ===
- Haruki Nakamura, Cincinnati (Coaches-1)
- Eric Wicks, Pitt (Coaches-1)
- Courtney Greene, Rutgers (Coaches-2)
- Joe Fields, Syracuse (Coaches-2)

== Special teams ==
=== Kickers ===
- Art Carmody, Louisville (Coaches-1)
- Pat McAfee, West Virginia (Coaches-2)

=== Punters ===
- Kevin Huber, Cincinnati (Coaches-1)
- Rob Long, Syracuse (Coaches-2)

=== Return specialist ===
- Max Suter, Syracuse (Coaches-1)
- Tyvon Branch, UConn (Coaches-2)

== Individual awards ==
- Offensive player of the year - Patrick White, West Virginia, quarterback
- Defensive player of the year - George Selvie, South Florida, defensive end
- Special teams player of the year - Kevin Huber, Cincinnati, punter
- Rookie of the year - LeSean McCoy, Pitt, running back
- Coach of the year - Brian Kelly, Cincinnati

== Key ==
Coaches, selected by the conference coaches

== See also ==
- 2007 All-America college football team
