= Sheffey =

Sheffey is a surname. Notable people with the surname include:

- Daniel Sheffey (1770–1830), American politician
- Hugh White Sheffey (1815–1889), American politician, lawyer, and judge
- Jeremy Sheffey (born 1984), American football player
- Robert Sheffey (1820–1902), American Methodist preacher
