= Quinton Andrews =

American football player (born 1987)

No. 21
- Position: Safety

Personal information
- Born: June 23, 1987 (age 39); Opa-locka, Florida, U.S.
- Listed height: 5 ft 11 in (1.80 m)
- Listed weight: 206 lb (93 kg)

Career information
- High school: Monsignor Edward Pace (Miami Gardens, Florida)
- College: North Alabama
- NFL draft: 2010: undrafted

Career history
- Green Bay Blizzard (2010); Utah Blaze (2011); San Jose SaberCats (2011)

Awards and highlights
- Third-team All-Freshman (2006); Third-team All-American (2006); Second-team All-Big East (2007); Sugar Bowl champion (2006); Gator Bowl champion (2007); Fiesta Bowl champion (2008)

Career AFL statistics
- Total tackles: 41
- Pass deflections: 2
- Fumble recoveries: 1
- Stats at ArenaFan.com

Quinton Andrews (born June 23, 1987) is an American former football safety. He played college football at North Alabama. Andrews played the prior three years of his career at West Virginia.

== Early life ==
Andrews is one of the four children of Laurena Andrews and Kelvin Daye. He was part of the state championship basketball team his sophomore year and lettered in track also. The Monsignor Edward Pace High School Spartans won the state title his junior year and he was named to the Dade-Broward All-Star game. During his senior year, he recorded 85 tackles, three interceptions, two forced fumbles, and also recorded 26 receptions for 637 yards and eight touchdowns. He was named to the First-team All-State and All-Dade teams as a senior.

== College career ==
=== Recruitment ===
Measureables
Ht.	Wt.	40 yd.	20 Shut.	Bench Reps.	Bench Max.	Vertical Jump	Broad Jump
5'11"	190 lb.	4.6	4.34	14	265	34"	9'1"

Andrews, a three star recruit, was ranked as the 22nd best safety in the nation by Rivals.com. Also, Rivals had him ranked as the 53rd best prospect coming from Florida in 2005, and future teammate Quarterback Jarrett Brown was ranked 66th on the list. He received offers from schools such as Florida, Miami (Fla.), Georgia, West Virginia, Kansas State, Clemson, and NC State. But was considering being in a "package deal" with his best friend Conredge Collins, whom later went to rival Pitt.

In November 2004, Andrews narrowed his list down to his top five schools, which were: Florida, Miami (Fla.), Georgia, West Virginia, and Kansas State. Then in January 2005 it was announced that he had narrowed his list down to two schools, Florida and West Virginia. On January 14, he visited West Virginia and gave them a verbal commitment, however it was not announced until two weeks later.

=== West Virginia University ===
==== Freshman (2005) ====
In 2005, as a freshman, Andrews redshirt, which meant he would not be on the varsity team, but however the scout team.

==== Redshirt Freshman (2006) ====
During a skeleton drill, a drill in which there is no offensive nor defensive linemen and rushing of the quarterback is not allowed, one day in March, Andrews hit starting quarterback Pat White, which instigated a scuffle between Andrews and several offensive players. Andrews was nicknamed the team's "Hit Man", for being such a hard-hitter in practice. With Mike Lorello and Jahmile Addae having graduated, only Eric Wicks was the certain starting safety.

In 2006, Andrews was named starter for the Friends of Coal Bowl against Marshall, and since that game he started every game for the rest of the year. He recorded 75 tackles, and a team-high five interceptions, returned for 67 yards. He had an interception against Georgia Tech in the Toyota Gator Bowl. The interception was on a goal-line situation and was key in the Mountaineers comeback. He was named to the Third-team Freshman All-American team, along with fellow Mountaineer Greg Isdaner, and named a Third-team All-American by Sporting News.

==== Redshirt Sophomore (2007) ====
In 2007, Andrews missed the Blue-Gold Spring Game due to off-field issues reported by head coach Rich Rodriguez. Andrews was then selected as a preseason Second-team All-Big East selection by Lindy's. On June 2, 2007, he was arrested in West Virginia for obstructing an officer. Coach Rodriguez said he had no comments until he talked to Andrews. Andrews was benched for the season opener against Western Michigan, but returned for the second game of the season against Marshall to record two tackles, one sack, and a pass break-up. In the 21–13 loss at South Florida, he recorded a season-high nine tackles and a pass deflection. He missed the Mississippi State and Rutgers games with a knee injury. he returned for the Louisville victory with four tackles and a pass deflection. The next week against No. 22 Cincinnati, he recorded five tackles and three pass deflections. He finished the regular season in the loss to Pitt with five tackles. In the season finale, the 48–28 win over Oklahoma in the Fiesta Bowl, he recorded seven tackles and an interception of Sam Bradford in the endzone.

Andrews finished the season with 51 tackles, seven pass break-ups and one interception. His tackles were the fifth-best on the team while his pass break-ups led the team.

==== Redshirt Junior (2008) ====
In 2008, before the season, Andrews was named to two lists, the Second-team All-Big East team by Athlon Sports, and the First-team All-Big East by Phil Steele's Football Magazine. He had also decided that he needed to change, because he didn't want people to think that he was a "street thug," and that he would not be as confrontational with coaches as he had been in the past. Also, at the beginning of preseason practices, he did not start at the bandit safety position that he had started at the previous year.

To begin his junior season, he recorded seven tackles in a 48–21 victory over Villanova. In the following 24–3 loss to East Carolina, he finished second on the team with nine tackles. In the 17–14 loss to Colorado, he led the team with 15 tackles and also had a tackle for a loss. In the following victory over Marshall, he had three tackles. Then in the Big East opener against Rutgers, Andrews recorded two tackles and a tackle for a loss. In the 17–6 win over Syracuse, he led the team with nine tackles and two pass break-ups. In the 34–17 win over Auburn, he recorded three tackles. In the following 35–13 win over UConn, Andrews recorded six tackles and a pass break-up. In the 26–23 loss in overtime to Cincinnati, Andrews recorded 5 tackles and a tackle for a four-yard loss.

Andrews finished his junior season with 77 total tackles, 4 for a loss, a sack, one interception, and a fumble recovery. His total tackles were second on the team, only behind Mortty Ivy.

=== North Alabama ===
==== Redshirt Senior (2009) ====
Following the West Virginia Mountaineers' Meineke Car Care Bowl victory over North Carolina, Andrews was dismissed from the team by head coach Bill Stewart. He reported that he wanted to join Terry Bowden's team at North Alabama.

== Professional career ==
After going undrafted in 2010, Andrews played for the Green Bay Blizzard of the Indoor Football League in 2010. He advanced to the Arena Football League in 2011, playing for both the Utah Blaze and San Jose SaberCats.
