= Jeremy Sheffey =

American football player (born 1984)

Profile
- Position: Offensive Lineman / Defensive Lineman

Personal information
- Born: April 5, 1984 (age 42); Baltimore, Maryland
- Listed height: 6 ft 3 in (1.91 m)
- Listed weight: 295 lb (134 kg)

Career information
- High school: Cannonsburg (KY) Boyd County
- College: West Virginia
- NFL draft: 2007: undrafted

Career history
- San Diego Chargers (2007)*; New York Dragons (2008)*; Green Bay Blizzard (2008)
- * Offseason or practice squad member only

Awards and highlights
- 2005 Second-team All-Big East; 2006 First-team All-Big East
- Stats at ArenaFan.com

Jeremy Sheffey (born April 5, 1984) is an American former professional football offensive lineman / defensive lineman. He played collegiately at West Virginia.

In his career Sheffey also played for the San Diego Chargers of the National Football League and the New York Dragons of the Arena Football League and the Green Bay Blizzard of af2.

== Early life ==
Sheffey moved to Catlettsburg, Kentucky after graduating from middle school in Baltimore. He then played high school football at Boyd County High School, where he was a two-time all-area selection and was named to the three-year all-district team. He was also a national champion in ballet and dance in high school.

== Collegiate career ==
Sheffey enrolled at West Virginia University in January 2002, where he began his football career in 2003 as a freshman. He did not see very much playing time his freshman season, sitting behind guard Jeff Berk. He recorded a team-high four knockdowns against East Carolina though, and saw increased playing time at left guard in the second half of the game against Cincinnati. He also started against Miami (Fla.).

In his sophomore season, 2004, Sheffey earned a starting role on the offensive line. He played in every game that season, blocking for quarterback Rasheed Marshall and running back Kay-Jay Harris. He moved into the starting lineup against UConn and recorded 20 knockdowns on the season.

As a junior in 2005, Sheffey headed an offensive line along with future All-American Dan Mozes (who started the season at guard, but moved to center). He earned second-team All-Big East honors, while Mozes earned first-team honors. Although he suffered a chest contusion in the East Carolina win, he came back and recorded seven knockdowns in the win over Louisville in triple-overtime. He also recorded eight knockdowns against Cincinnati and UConn.

In 2006, as a senior, Sheffey led one of the most successful senior classes in Mountaineer history along with Mozes (who was a senior as well). Blocking for All-American running back Steve Slaton and All-Big East quarterback Pat White, he made the list for the Outland Trophy (nation's best lineman) and earned All-Big East honors for the second consecutive year.

== Professional career ==
Before the NFL draft, Sheffey held a Pro Day at West Virginia on March 8, 2007. He ran a 5.11 40 yard dash, recorded 35 225 lb. bench reps, and recorded a 4.78 shuttle time. He was projected to be an undrafted free agent.

Sheffey went unselected in the 2007 NFL draft and became free agent. Shortly after the draft, the same day of the last rounds (April 29), he was the first of the Mountaineers who entered in the draft to be signed as a free agent. He was signed by the San Diego Chargers, who didn't take an offensive lineman in the draft. He was released by the Chargers in August 2007.

On Wednesday February 13, 2008, Sheffey signed with the New York Dragons of the Arena Football League. Eight days later, he was placed on recallable waivers.

After being waived by the Dragons, Sheffey signed with the Green Bay Blizzard of the af2 indoor football league (which is a "minor league" for the Arena Football League).

In late 2008, Sheffey was placed on injured reserve by the Blizzard after he injured his knee against the Quad City Steamwheelers. For the season, he played in five games, he carried the ball 12 times for 26 yards and two touchdowns. He also recorded 2.5 total tackles on defense. After the season, he was released by the Blizzard.

== See also ==
- List of Arena Football League and National Football League players
