= Durant High School (Florida) =

Location
- 4748 Cougar Path; Plant City, Florida, 33567; United States; 27.8883°N 82.1752°W

Information
- Funding type: Public high school
- Established: 1995
- School district: Hillsborough County Public Schools
- Principal: Thomas Snyder
- Teaching staff: 105.38 (FTE)
- Grades: 9–12
- Enrollment: 2,504 (2024–2025)
- Student to teacher ratio: 23.76
- Colors: Dark Blue, Gold, and White
- Mascot: Cougar
- Website: www.hillsboroughschools.org/o/durant

Durant High School is a public high school in Plant City, Florida, United States. The school opened in 1995 and is named for the community in which it is located. The school's first principal, Ron Frost, died of cancer in 1997. The Durant High School football stadium is named in his honor. Principals have included Ron Frost (1995–1997), Sherry Sikes (1997–1999), Joe Perez (1999–2004), Pamela Bowden (2004–2019), Gary Graham (2019–2025), and Thomas Synder (2025–present).

The school mascot is the cougar, and the school newspaper is The PawPrint, which is part of the High School National Ad Network.

== Graduation Rate ==
In 2012 Durant's graduation rate was 86% as compared to a statewide rate of 74.5% and a Hillsborough County rate of 72.6%.

== State of Florida School Grades ==
- 2024 B
- 2023 B
- 2022 B
- 2019 B
- 2018 B
- 2017 C
- 2016 C
- 2012 A
- 2011 B
- 2010 B
- 2009 B
- 2008 B npr

== Notable alumni ==
- Brooke Bennett – Olympic gold medalist
- Tyler Danish – Major League Baseball pitcher
- Adrienne Gang – Below Deck Bravo TV personality
- Sean Hermann – Pitcher in the Seattle Mariners organization
- Ryan Raburn – Former MLB outfielder
- Ean Randolph – American and Canadian football wide receiver
- Jaclyn Raulerson – Miss Florida 2010
- Jeremy Rosado – American singer
- Justin Lee Stanley – Filmmaker (Director of Evil Lives Here)
- Alicia Tirelli – American-born Puerto Rican retired footballer
- Trae Williams – pro football player
