= Boo McLee =

American gridiron football player (1983–2020)

No. 43
- Position: Linebacker

Personal information
- Born: November 24, 1983; Caddo Parish Shreveport, Louisiana, U.S.
- Died: April 12, 2020 (aged 36); Uniontown, Pennsylvania, U.S.
- Listed height: 6 ft 1 in (1.85 m)
- Listed weight: 244 lb (111 kg)

Career information
- College: West Virginia
- NFL draft: 2007: undrafted

Career history
- St. Louis Rams (2007)*; Calgary Stampeders (2008)*; Wheeling Wildcats (2009)
- * Offseason or practice squad member only

Awards and highlights
- 2005 All-Big East First-team; 2005 All-ECAC
- Stats at ArenaFan.com

Cleo Kevin "Boo" McLee Jr. (November 24, 1983 – April 12, 2020) was an American football linebacker. He played collegiately at West Virginia University.

== College career ==
During high school in Uniontown, Pennsylvania (suburban Pittsburgh), McLee rushed for 1,637 yards and led the team in tackles. McLee also lettered in basketball and track.

Following his uncle Billy and cousin Reggie McLee's footsteps, McLee attended West Virginia University. He was interested in Michigan State and Pittsburgh, but neither one gave him offers. McLee redshirted his 2002 freshman year, learning the complex 3-3-5 defensive scheme, but was rookie of the week in practice during the game week against the Miami Hurricanes.

=== Freshman (2002) ===
In 2002, McLee red-shirted his true freshman season.

=== Freshman (2003) ===
In 2003, McLee got more playing time with the graduation of Grant Wiley, 2002's starting linebacker. Behind linebacker Scott Gyorko, McLee totaled 46 tackles for the year and three sacks. McLee recorded two tackles against Wisconsin, three tackles and a sack in the game against the Cincinnati, and six tackles, a sack, and a fumble recovery against the Maryland. McLee also forced fumble against Miami and Virginia Tech. In the Gator Bowl, McLee recorded six tackles.

=== Sophomore (2004) ===
In 2004, McLee played on the Mountaineer team that was expected to be National Championship contenders with Rasheed Marshall, Adam "Pacman" Jones, Chris Henry, and Kay-Jay Harris. Although the Mountaineers ended 8–4, McLee had a good season. McLee shared time with fellow junior Jeff Noechel, but recorded 44 tackles on the year. In an overtime win against Maryland, McLee recorded six tackles and forced a fumble. Against Virginia Tech, McLee led the team with 11 tackles and recorded a 10-yard sack against Boston College. McLee had a team-best eight tackles in the Gator Bowl loss to Florida State.

=== Junior (2005) ===
In 2005, McLee teamed up with a strong defense of Mike Lorello and Jahmile Addae at safeties. McLee earned 2005 first-team All-Big East honors, ESPN All-Conference honors, and All-ECAC honors as the starter. McLee recorded 78 tackles, which was second-best on the team. McLee had a team-high six tackles at Syracuse for the season-opener, a team-best 11 tackles in the East Carolina win, team-best nine tackles and a sack of Marcus Vick against Virginia Tech, 10 tackles and two pass break-ups in overtime win against the Louisville, 30-yard interception against UConn, and was the leading tackler with 11 tackles against Pitt. McLee won Gridiron Gladiator Award from the West Virginia coaches and was the Big East player of the week against Cincinnati. He was also named MVP on defense against Syracuse, Virginia Tech, Cincinnati, and Pitt.

=== Senior (2006) ===
In 2006, McLee finally started the whole season. He finished the season with 79 tackles but no sacks. McLee had his second career interception against Connecticut, which he returned for 10 yards. McLee had 9 tackles against Marshall, six tackles against Maryland, six against Syracuse, six against Connecticut, six against Cincinnati, and eight tackles in the overtime win against Rutgers. McLee finished the season on the Butkus Award list and traveled to the Senior Bowl. In his final game as a Mountaineer, McLee totaled three tackles against Georgia Tech in the Gator Bowl.

== Professional career ==
=== Pre-Draft ===
During the Senior Bowl, McLee was reported to be "looking quick". ESPN ranked McLee as the #14 inside linebacker in the class, out of the 29-ranked inside linebacker prospects. His toughness was praised, while his discipline and learning of schemes were issues. McLee played all three linebacking positions in college, which NFL scouts praised.

=== NFL draft ===
McLee went undrafted in the 2007 NFL draft. A day later, McLee signed with the St. Louis Rams, who did not take any linebackers in the draft, as an undrafted free agent. "It's a slap in the face," McLee said. "Not one of us was drafted. It's very disappointing. We're going to show the league that we can play... They're going to notice us."

On July 18, 2007, McLee's father, Kevin McLee Sr., who was a running back at Georgia, and former Tampa Bay Buccaneer died at the age of 52.

In October 2007, McLee was charged with intent to deliver cocaine and marijuana and several traffic violations. The charges were dropped on February 12, 2008. The charges, however, were refiled on February 18.

=== CFL ===
Following being cut by the St. Louis Rams, McLee was signed by the Calgary Stampeders of the Canadian Football League to a one-year deal. He reported that the Green Bay Packers were interested in him after his season with Calgary. McLee was later released by Calgary.

=== AFL ===
In 2008, he played in the af2 (a sort of "farm league" for the Arena Football League) with the Iowa Barnstormers and the Green Bay Blizzard.

=== UNGL ===
McLee was drafted into the newly created United National Gridiron League by Team Louisiana.

== Personal ==
In 2016, McLee was charged in a string of bank robberies in Pittsburgh and Crafton, Pennsylvania. He pleaded guilty in 2019.

McLee died on April 12, 2020.
