= Renardo Foster =

American football player (born 1984)

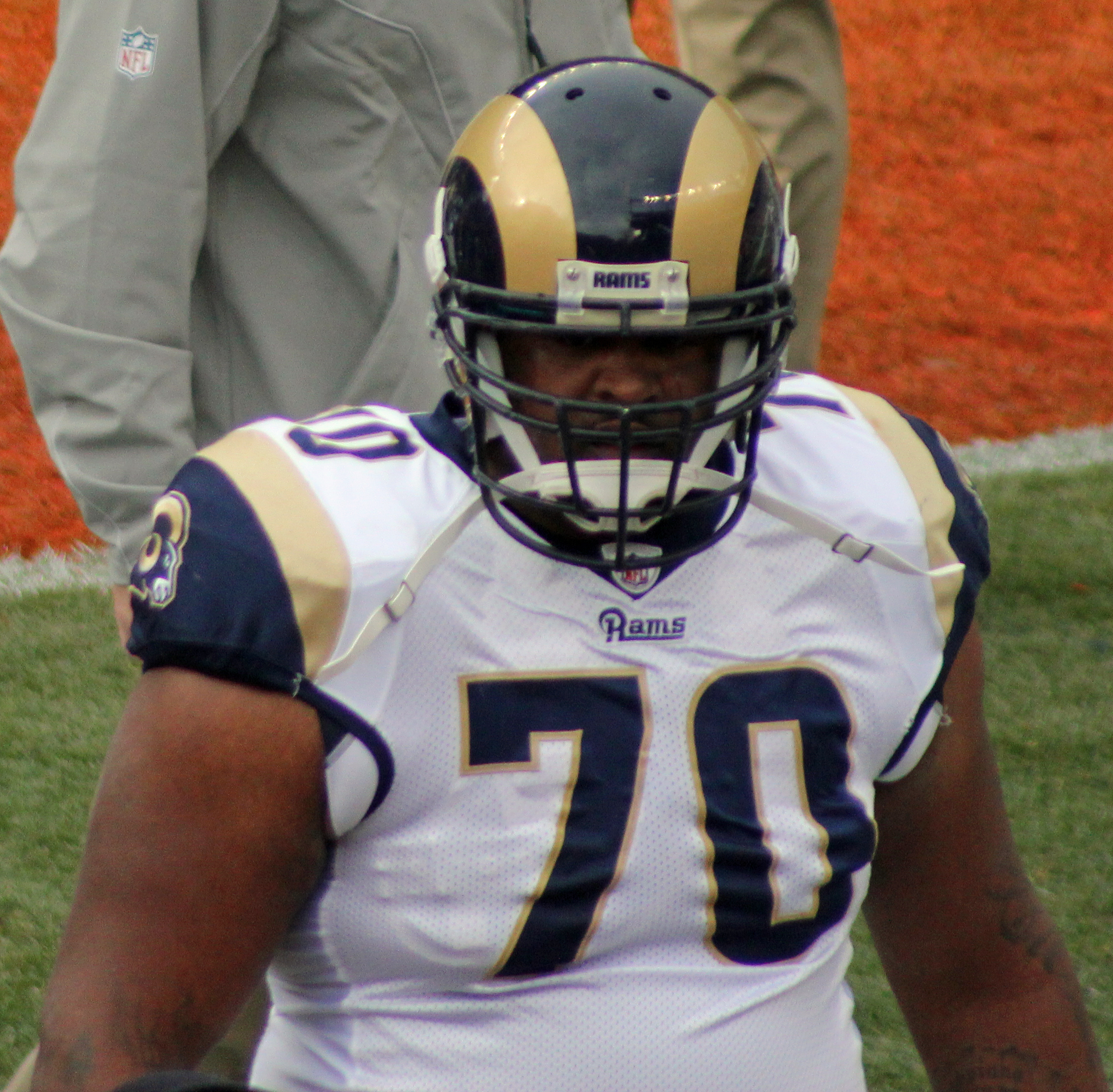
- Foster with the St. Louis Rams in 2010

No. 70, 79
- Position: Offensive tackle

Personal information
- Born: July 15, 1984 (age 42); Ripley, Tennessee, U.S.
- Listed height: 6 ft 7 in (2.01 m)
- Listed weight: 340 lb (154 kg)

Career information
- College: Louisville
- NFL draft: 2007: undrafted

Career history
- Atlanta Falcons (2007–2008); St. Louis Rams (2009)*; New Orleans Saints (2009)*; Florida Tuskers (2010)*; St. Louis Rams (2010)
- * Offseason or practice squad member only

Awards and highlights
- C-USA All-Freshman (2003); First-team All-Big East (2006)

Career NFL statistics
- Games played: 7
- Games started: 2
- Stats at Pro Football Reference

Renardo Sontonio Foster (born July 15, 1984) is an American former professional football player who was an offensive tackle in the National Football League (NFL). He played college football for the Louisville Cardinals and was signed by the Atlanta Falcons as an undrafted free agent in 2007.

Foster was also a member of the St. Louis Rams, New Orleans Saints and Florida Tuskers.

== Professional career ==
As a rookie in 2007, Foster played in seven games with two starts for the Atlanta Falcons. He was placed on injured reserve on October 24, 2007, due to a knee injury. He was placed on the physically-unable-to-perform list on July 25, 2008. He was waived on June 16, 2009.

Foster was claimed off waivers by the St. Louis Rams on June 19, 2009. He was waived on September 4.

Foster was added to the Saints' practice squad on September 30, 2009. He was released on October 13 and re-signed to the practice squad on October 16. He was released again on December 23.

In 2010, Foster had another stint with the Rams, this time playing in 10 games with one start.

== Personal life ==
Foster's younger brother Ramon Foster was a guard for the Pittsburgh Steelers from 2009 to 2019.
