= Willie Foster (gridiron football) =

American gridiron football player (born 1984)

No. 17
- Positions: Wide receiver Kick returner

Personal information
- Born: December 13, 1984 (age 41); Miami, Florida, U.S.
- Listed height: 5 ft 9 in (1.75 m)
- Listed weight: 170 lb (77 kg)

Career information
- College: Rutgers
- NFL draft: 2007: undrafted

Career history
- Winnipeg Blue Bombers (2007)

Awards and highlights
- Big East Special Teams Player of the Year (2005)

Willie Foster (born December 13, 1984) is an American former football wide receiver. He played college football for Rutgers, and professionally for the Winnipeg Blue Bombers of the Canadian Football League (CFL).

== Early life ==
Willie Foster was born on December 13, 1984, in Miami, Florida. He began his football career at Miami Central High School. Although Foster sat out his freshman and sophomore seasons, he was a dual athlete in both football and track and field. As a football player, Foster started every game as a junior and senior as a wide receiver for the Miami Central Rockets, totaling 17 touchdowns in two years. Foster was also part the 2002 Miami Central track and field team, which won the Class 6A state title, led by teammate Bershawn Jackson. After graduating from Miami Central in 2003 he was considered a four-star football prospect by Rivals.com. He eventually accepted a Rutgers University scholarship offer.

== College career ==
As a freshman for the Rutgers Scarlet Knights in 2003, Foster played a total of six games as a wide receiver and kick returner. As a freshman Foster totaled four kickoff returns for 67 yards and four punt returns for 54 yards.

As a sophomore in 2004, Foster scored his first collegiate touchdown on an 80-yard kickoff return against the UConn Huskies.

As a junior in 2006, Foster was one of six Rutgers players who earned All-Big East honors, and he was named the Big East Special Teams Player of the Year. Foster was also named to the All-Big East First Team as a kick returner/punt returner.

== Professional career ==
Foster played for the Winnipeg Blue Bombers of the Canadian Football League (CFL) in 2007.
