= Dan Mozes =

American football player (born 1983)

No. 67
- Position: Center

Personal information
- Born: September 15, 1983 (age 43); Washington, Pennsylvania, U.S.
- Listed height: 6 ft 3 in (1.91 m)
- Listed weight: 293 lb (133 kg)

Career information
- High school: Washington
- College: West Virginia
- NFL draft: 2007: undrafted

Career history
- Minnesota Vikings (2007)

Awards and highlights
- Rimington Trophy (2006); Unanimous All-American (2006); Second-team All-American (2005); First-team All-Big East (2004, 2005, 2006)

Daniel Mozes (born September 15, 1983) is an American former professional football player who was a center for the Minnesota Vikings the National Football League (NFL). He played college football for the West Virginia Mountaineers, earning unanimous All-American honors and was recognized as the best college center, winning the Rimington Trophy. He signed with the NFL's Minnesota Vikings as an undrafted free agent. He is currently an assistant coach.

== College career ==
Mozes attended West Virginia University, where he was a four-year starter for the Mountaineers from 2003 to 2006. For the first two years of his career, he played at left guard on the offensive line. In the middle of his junior year, he moved to center. He was a three-time All-Big East academic all-star (2003–2005).

=== Freshman (2002) ===
Mozes redshirted and saw no action the entire season. However, he still won the Danny Van Etten Award as top offensive rookie performer on WVU's scout teams.

=== Freshman (2003) ===
After redshirting a year, Mozes started every game his redshirt freshman season at left guard. During 2003, he was named first-team All-Big East and became a freshman All-American while starting every game. He recorded 32 knockdowns and was the MVP against the Central Florida and Rutgers. He won the Gridiron Gladiator Award from the WVU coaches for his play on-field. He recorded a team high six knockdowns against the Miami Hurricanes and five against Virginia Tech. He suffered a hip sprain against the Pitt. He won MVP honors against Wisconsin and was named rookie of the week against Cincinnati.

=== Sophomore (2004) ===
Mozes was named First-team All-Big East, and started every game of the season. He also won academic All-Big East accolades.

=== Junior (2005) ===
During his junior year, Mozes started two games at left guard. For the game against Maryland, he was moved to center. Since that game, he started at that position. After recording seven knockdowns, he sprained his left ankle in the game against Cincinnati, which put him in pain for the last three games of the season. He was named Offensive MVP against Virginia Tech and Pitt. He was named 2005 Second-team All-American by the Associated Press. He was also named first-team All-Big East for the second consecutive year, Rimington Trophy finalist, named to the ESPN All-Conference squad, and named to the All-ECAC squad.

=== Senior (2006) ===
As a senior, Mozes was named an NCAA unanimous All-American and won the Rimington Trophy for the nation's best Center. By winning the award, he became the first Mountaineer since 1916 (when awards were first handed out) to win a national award. He was also a finalist for the Outland Trophy, was a semifinalist for the Lombardi Award, and won the Rimington Trophy. He led the way for the Mountaineers team that recorded over 3,600 yards rushing in 2006. His offensive line also was strong in the passing game, where they only gave up 1.17 sacks per game (Mozes gave up no sacks). He, and the back he blocked for, Steve Slaton, were the only Big East players named to first-team All-American team, and they were the first pair of consensus All-Americans in school history. Mozes and Slaton were also the 10th and 11th players in school history to earn the honor.

On May 17, 2007, about a month after signing his deal with the Vikings in the NFL, Mozes won the 2007 Fred Schaus Captain's Award. The award is presented annually to the school's most outstanding varsity team captains.

== Professional career ==
=== Pre-draft ===
Mozes left West Virginia as a senior and was expected to be a second-day pick in the 2007 NFL draft.

After the Senior Bowl, NFL Draft Countdown's Scott Wright reported that Mozes was the ninth prospect whose stock was slipping the most, saying "[He is a] Highly-decorated college player who lacks the physical tools for the next level."

ESPN reported that Mozes was their No. 8 center in the 2007 class. His effort was a big positive, while they worried about his size against NFL defenders. He was compared to Indianapolis Colts center Jeff Saturday. Athlon Sports reported that Mozes was their eighth center in the class as well. They said his "good smarts and instincts" were a positive, while he "struggles to get movement off the ball."

In an April 19 article from Sports Illustrated.com, writer Stewart Mandel picked Mozes as the most underrated offensive lineman in the class. Mandel said,"...Mozes was one of the nation's best. It's hard to believe he's not worthy of a selection somewhere over the course of seven rounds."

=== NFL draft ===
Mozes went unselected in the 2007 NFL draft. He was signed a day after by the Minnesota Vikings.

=== National Football League career ===
Mozes checked into Gage Hall on July 25, for the start of training camp. He completed his physical upon arrival and passed completely for the 2007 season. However, on August 6, 2007, he tore his Anterior cruciate ligament (ACL) on his right knee while making a block in practice. He was then place on Injured Reserve on August 8. And missing the entire 2007 season. He was waived by the Vikings on August 8. However, he returned to the Vikings for their 2008 training camp due to the absence of Matt Birk.

== Coaching career ==
=== University of Michigan ===
Mozes is currently an assistant strength and conditioning coach at the University of Michigan, joining the program in February 2009. His boss at Michigan, Mike Barwis, was his strength coach at West Virginia.
