= Clark Harris =

American football player (born 1984)

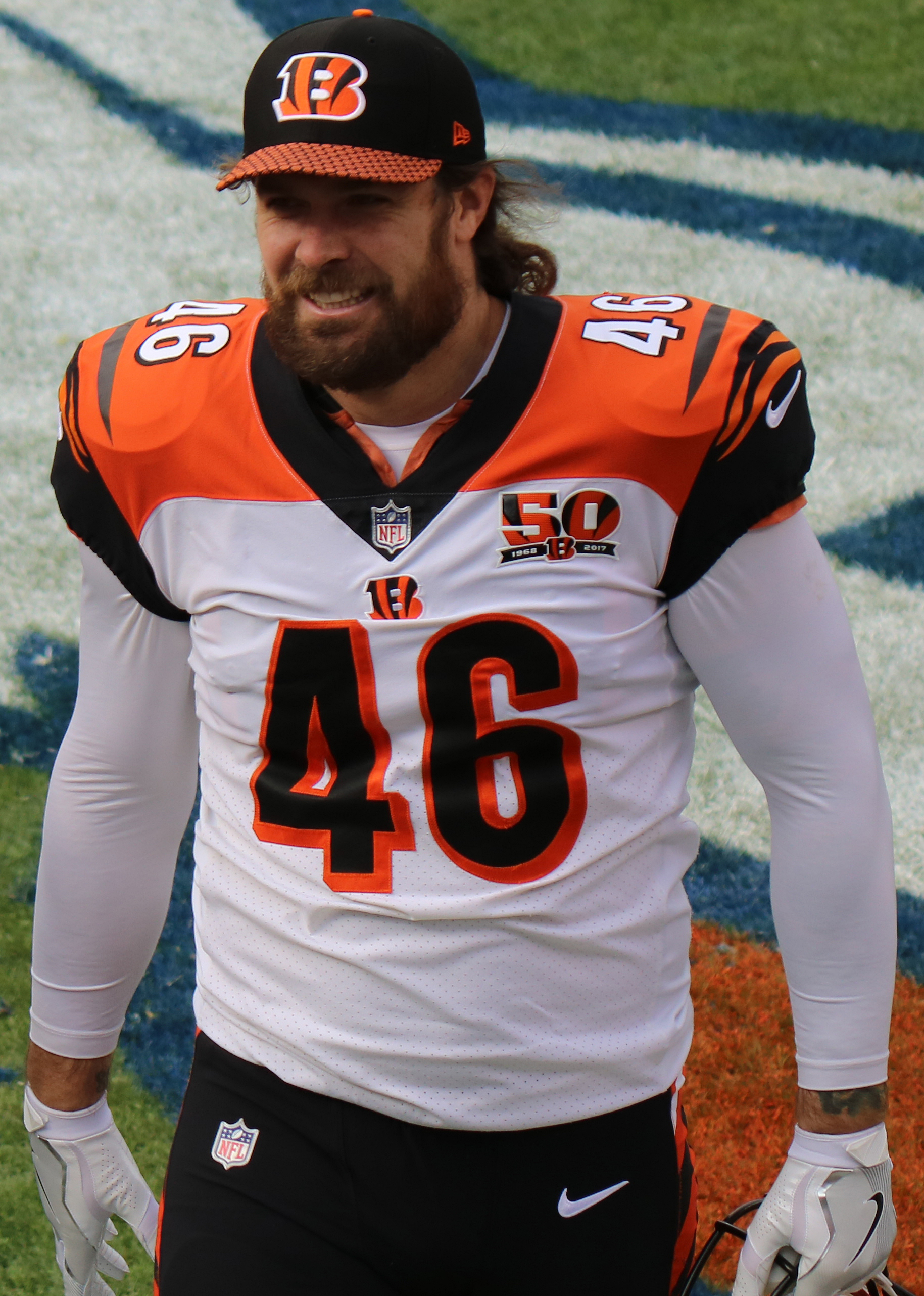
- Harris with the Cincinnati Bengals in 2017

No. 82, 46
- Position: Long snapper

Personal information
- Born: July 10, 1984 (age 42); Manahawkin, New Jersey, U.S.
- Listed height: 6 ft 5 in (1.96 m)
- Listed weight: 252 lb (114 kg)

Career information
- High school: Southern (Manahawkin)
- College: Rutgers (2002–2006)
- NFL draft: 2007: 7th round, 243rd overall pick

Career history
- Green Bay Packers (2007)*; Detroit Lions (2007–2008)*; Houston Texans (2008–2009); Cincinnati Bengals (2009–2022)
- * Offseason or practice squad member only

Awards and highlights
- Pro Bowl (2017); 3× First-team All-Big East (2004–2006)

Career NFL statistics
- Games played: 206
- Total tackles: 33
- Stats at Pro Football Reference

Clark Harris (born July 10, 1984) is an American former professional football player who was a long snapper in the National Football League (NFL). He played college football for the Rutgers Scarlet Knights and was selected by the Green Bay Packers in the seventh round of the 2007 NFL draft. Harris was also a member of the Detroit Lions and Houston Texans before signing with the Cincinnati Bengals, where he played for 14 seasons as a Long snapper.

== Early life ==
Harris played both tight end and defensive end in high school at Southern Regional High School in Manahawkin, New Jersey for Head Coach Chuck Donahue. The Times-Observer and The Star-Ledger named him All-Ocean County, and was an All-Press of Atlantic City choice following his senior season. Rated the 22nd-best tight end in the nation by Student Sports Magazine, adding All-American and all-region honors from PrepStar. Led the team to a berth in the NJSIAA's South Jersey Group IV playoffs; he made 29 tackles, including six sacks and seven stops behind the line of scrimmage while also recovering two fumbles, returning one for a score in 2001. Also caught seven passes for 361 yards and three touchdowns that year. Of his 13 career receptions in a run-oriented offense, five went for scores.

The three-year starter also handled the long-snapping duties, earning a spot on the New Jersey Football Coaches Association Super 100 football team. The versatile athlete also played basketball and competed in track. Harris was selected to compete in the North-South New Jersey All-Star Basketball Game. In track, Harris finished fifth in the Meet of Champions in the javelin with a throw of 180 feet, 3 inches as a junior and placed fourth in the javelin at the Penn Relays as a senior. Graduated as a Rotary Club Scholar-Athlete and played for New Jersey in the 2002 Governor's Bowl.

== College career ==
Harris played college football at Rutgers. He did not see action in 2002. In 2003, he played in all 12 games and caught 18 passes for 213 yards. In 2004, Harris earned First-team All-Big East honors after leading conference tight ends in catches (53), yards (725), and touchdowns (5). In 2005, he earned First-team All-Big East honors for the second consecutive year, catching 38 passes for 584 yards and four touchdowns. He was also the Scarlet Knights long snapper.

== Professional career ==
Pre-draft measurables
Height	Weight	Arm length	Hand span	40-yard dash	10-yard split	20-yard split	20-yard shuttle	Vertical jump	Broad jump	Bench press
6 ft 5 1/2 in (1.97 m)	261 lb (118 kg)	32 1/8 in (0.82 m)	9 3/4 in (0.25 m)	4.83 s	1.70 s	2.81 s	4.40 s	32.0 in (0.81 m)	9 ft 4 in (2.84 m)	21 reps
All values from NFL Combine

=== Green Bay Packers ===
Harris was selected by the Green Bay Packers in the seventh round as the 243rd overall pick of the 2007 NFL draft. He was later cut by the team on September 1, 2007. Harris was re-added to the practice squad the next day but was cut again on September 11.

=== Detroit Lions ===
Harris was then signed by the Detroit Lions to the practice squad on November 28, 2007. He was re-signed by the Lions on August 19, 2008, only to be waived during final cuts on August 30.

=== Houston Texans ===
On September 17, 2008, Harris was signed to the practice squad of the Houston Texans after the team released linebacker Kevis Coley. On September 30, the team released Harris and re-signed Coley. Harris was re-signed to the Texans' practice squad again on November 5. He was promoted to the active roster on December 3 after long snapper Bryan Pittman was suspended four games.

He was waived on September 5 and re-signed to the practice squad the next day. He was released from the practice squad on October 6.

=== Cincinnati Bengals ===
Harris was signed by the Cincinnati Bengals on October 13, 2009, to be the team's long snapper. He played his first game with the Bengals October 18 against his former team, the Houston Texans. He played in the final eleven games of that season, and all sixteen games in the 2010 through 2013 seasons. Harris helped the Bengals win the AFC North Division Championship in 2009, 2013, 2015, and 2021. He also played in the Bengals 2009, 2011, 2012, 2013, 2014, 2015, and 2021 AFC Wild-Card Playoff games.

On October 16, 2017, Harris signed a one-year contract extension with the Bengals through the 2018 season. On January 16, 2018, Harris was named to his first Pro Bowl.

On November 5, 2018, Harris signed a two-year contract extension with the Bengals through the 2020 season.

On March 3, 2021, Harris signed a one-year contract extension. He signed another extension on March 16, 2022.

In Week 1 of the 2022 season, Harris suffered a torn biceps and was placed on injured reserve on September 12, 2022. This was the first time Harris missed time due to injury in his career.
