= Trae Williams =

American football player (born 1985)

No. 37
- Position: Cornerback

Personal information
- Born: January 30, 1985 (age 41); Thomasville, Georgia, U.S.
- Listed height: 5 ft 9 in (1.75 m)
- Listed weight: 193 lb (88 kg)

Career information
- High school: Durant (Plant City, Florida)
- College: South Florida
- NFL draft: 2008: 5th round, 159th overall pick

Career history
- Jacksonville Jaguars (2008)*; Philadelphia Eagles (2008–2009)*; Seattle Seahawks (2009)*; Pittsburgh Steelers (2009); Tampa Bay Buccaneers (2010)*; Buffalo Bills (2010)*
- * Offseason or practice squad member only

Awards and highlights
- First-team All-Big East (2006); Second-team All-Big East (2007)
- Stats at Pro Football Reference

Trae Williams (born January 30, 1985) is an American former professional football cornerback. He was selected by the Jacksonville Jaguars in the fifth round of the 2008 NFL draft. He played college football at South Florida.

Williams was also a member of the Philadelphia Eagles, Seattle Seahawks, Pittsburgh Steelers, Tampa Bay Buccaneers, and Buffalo Bills.

== Early life ==
Williams attended and played high school football at Durant High School in Plant City, Florida.

== College career ==
Williams attended the University of South Florida where he was a first and second-team all-Big East defensive back and a Thorpe Award candidate.

== Professional career ==
=== Jacksonville Jaguars ===
Williams was selected by the Jacksonville Jaguars in the fifth round of the 2008 NFL draft. He was waived prior to the start of the 2008 season.

=== Philadelphia Eagles ===
Williams was signed to the Philadelphia Eagles practice squad where he stayed for the entire 2008 season. He was signed to the active roster on January 20, 2009. He was waived on September 5, 2009.

=== Seattle Seahawks ===
Williams was signed to the Seattle Seahawks practice squad on November 3, 2009.

=== Pittsburgh Steelers ===
Williams was signed off the Seahawks' practice squad by the Pittsburgh Steelers on December 29, 2009. He was waived on June 15, 2010.

=== Tampa Bay Buccaneers ===
Williams signed with the Tampa Bay Buccaneers on August 16, 2010. He was cut by the Buccaneers on September 5, 2010.

=== Buffalo Bills ===
Williams was signed by the Buffalo Bills to the practice squad on November 29, 2010.
