= Ean Randolph =

American gridiron football player (born 1984)

No. 9
- Position: Wide receiver

Personal information
- Born: April 22, 1984 (age 42); Plant City, Florida, U.S.
- Listed height: 5 ft 8 in (1.73 m)
- Listed weight: 173 lb (78 kg)

Career information
- High school: Plant City (FL) Durant
- College: South Florida
- NFL draft: 2007: undrafted

Career history
- Kansas City Chiefs (2007)*; Montreal Alouettes (2008)
- * Offseason or practice squad member only

Awards and highlights
- Big East Special Teams Player of the Year (2006); First-team All-Big East (2006)

Ean Randolph (born April 22, 1984) is a former American and Canadian football wide receiver. He was signed by the Kansas City Chiefs of the National Football League (NFL) as an undrafted free agent in 2007. He played college football at South Florida.

Randolph was also a member of the Montreal Alouettes.

== Early life ==
Randolph was born in Plant City, Florida and attended Durant High School. He later attended Webber International University in 2004 and appeared in all ten games, leading the team with 50 receptions for 713 yards and four touchdowns. In 2005, Randolph transferred to the University of South Florida and majored in communications.

While playing for the South Florida Bulls football team in 2005, Randolph appeared all 13 games, earning Big East Special Teams Player of the Year and first-team All-Big East honors. He led the Bulls with 47 receptions for 479 yards with a team-high four touchdowns. Randolph also led the Big East and finished fourth in the nation with a 14.8-yard punt return average, racking up 370 yards on 25 returns and one touchdown.

== Professional career ==
After playing one season with the Bulls, Randolph intended to enter the NFL draft, but was not selected by any team. The Kansas City Chiefs signed Randolph after the departure of wide receiver and return specialist Dante Hall. The Chiefs released Randolph on September 1, 2007.
