= Derek Kinder =

American football player (born 1986)

No. 83
- Position: Wide receiver

Personal information
- Born: May 25, 1986 (age 40); Albion, New York, U.S.
- Listed height: 6 ft 1 in (1.85 m)
- Listed weight: 210 lb (95 kg)

Career information
- High school: Albion
- College: Pittsburgh
- NFL draft: 2009: 7th round, 251st overall pick

Career history
- Chicago Bears (2009)*
- * Offseason or practice squad member only

Awards and highlights
- First-team All-Big East (2006)

Derek Kinder (born May 25, 1986) is an American former football wide receiver.

He attended Albion High School in Albion, New York, where he was a star athlete in football, baseball, and basketball. As a senior, he scored 33 touchdowns, rushed for 1,705 yards, and intercepted eight passes.

In December 2003, Kinder accepted a football scholarship from the University of Pittsburgh. As a junior in 2006, he tallied 57 receptions for 847 yards and six touchdowns and was selected as a first-team All-Big East player. He was a finalist for the ESPY Award for the "best play" in sports in 2006 for a "devastating hit that leveled two Mountaineer players" on a 73-yard punt return.

Kinder missed the 2007 season due to a knee injury. He made a comeback in 2008 and caught 36 passes for 422 yards.

He was selected in the seventh round of the 2009 NFL draft by the Chicago Bears. On August 31, 2009, he was released by the Bears.
