= Jahmile Addae =

American football player and coach (born 1984)

Miami Dolphins
- Title: Cornerbacks coach

Personal information
- Born: May 30, 1984 (age 42); Valrico, Florida, U.S.
- Listed height: 5 ft 10 in (1.78 m)
- Listed weight: 214 lb (97 kg)

Career information
- Position: Cornerback
- College: West Virginia (2001–2005)
- NFL draft: 2006: undrafted

Career history

Playing
- Tampa Bay Buccaneers (2006)*; Indianapolis Colts (2006)*
- * Offseason or practice squad member only

Coaching
- West Virginia (2007) Graduate assistant; Michigan (2008–2009) Graduate assistant; Cincinnati (2010) Director of player development; Cincinnati (2011–2012) Running backs coach; Arizona (2013–2015) Defensive analyst; Arizona (2016–2017) Defensive backs coach; Minnesota (2018) Defensive backs coach; West Virginia (2019) Secondary coach; West Virginia (2020) Co-defensive coordinator & cornerbacks coach; Georgia (2021) Defensive backs coach; Miami (2022–2023) Secondary coach; Buffalo Bills (2024–2025) Cornerbacks coach; Miami Dolphins (2026–present) Cornerbacks coach

Awards and highlights
- As player: 2× First-team All-Big East; As assistant coach: 1 National (2021)

Jahmile Addae (born May 30, 1984) is an American college and professional football coach who is currently the cornerbacks coach for the Miami Dolphins of the National Football League (NFL). He was a safety during his playing career.

== Playing career ==
Addae played college football at West Virginia, where he was a four-year starter, two-time captain, and two-time All-Big East cornerback.

Pre-draft measurables
Height	Weight	Arm length	Hand span	40-yard dash	10-yard split	20-yard split	Vertical jump	Broad jump
5 ft 10 1/4 in (1.78 m)	214 lb (97 kg)	31 in (0.79 m)	9 in (0.23 m)	4.72 s	1.62 s	2.79 s	38.5 in (0.98 m)	10 ft 2 in (3.10 m)
All values from NFL Combine

Addae was chosen for the 2006 Senior Bowl and participated in the NFL Scouting Combine. He signed as an undrafted free agent with the Tampa Bay Buccaneers but ended up spending the end of the season with the Indianapolis Colts.

== Coaching career ==
=== Graduate Assistant ===
In 2007 Addae got into coaching, working as a graduate assistant for the Mountaineers. In 2008 and 2009 he worked as a graduate assistant for Michigan.

=== Cincinnati ===
In 2010 he joined the Bearcats staff as Cincinnati's director of player development. In 2011 he was given an on the field position as the team's running backs coach which he held until the end of the 2012 season.

=== Arizona ===
Addae coached for five years at Arizona, first serving as an analyst from 2013 to 2015 then coaching the defensive backs in 2016 and 2017.

=== Minnesota ===
In 2018 he worked as the defensive backs coach for Minnesota.

=== West Virginia ===
In 2019 he returned to his alma mater to coach the secondary. He was given the title of cornerbacks coach in 2020.

=== Georgia ===
In 2021, Addae was the defensive backs coach for Georgia. He was part of the staff that won the National Championship over Alabama.

=== Miami ===
In 2022 he left Georgia and joined the Miami Hurricanes as the team's secondary coach.

=== Buffalo Bills ===
On February 7, 2024, Addae was named as cornerbacks coach for the Buffalo Bills under head coach Sean McDermott.

=== Miami Dolphins ===
On January 29, 2026, Addae was named as cornerbacks coach for the Miami Dolphins under new head coach Jeff Hafley.

== Personal life ==
Jahmile, and his wife, Maryann, have three sons.

His younger brother Jahleel Addae played safety in the NFL for the Colts.
