= Eric Wicks =

American football player (born 1985)

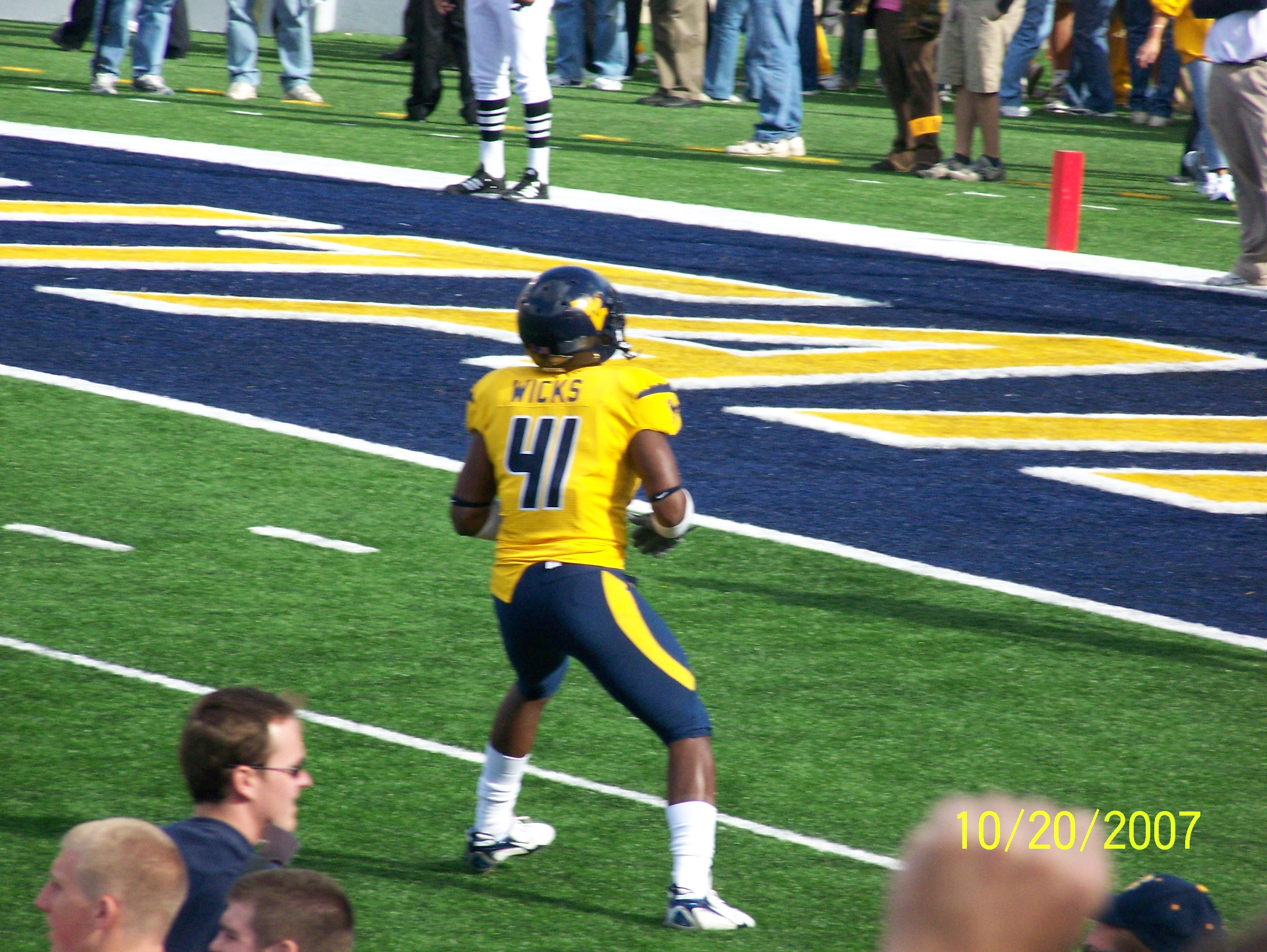
- Eric Wicks before the 2007 Mississippi State game

No. 4
- Position: Safety

Personal information
- Born: March 19, 1985 (age 41); Pittsburgh, Pennsylvania, U.S.
- Listed height: 6 ft 1 in (1.85 m)
- Listed weight: 210 lb (95 kg)

Career information
- College: West Virginia
- NFL draft: 2008: undrafted

Career history
- Seattle Seahawks (2008)*; Wheeling Wildcats (2009); Erie Explosion (2011)
- * Offseason or practice squad member only

Eric Wicks (born March 19, 1985) is an American former football safety. He was signed by the Seattle Seahawks as an undrafted free agent in 2008. He played college football at West Virginia.

== Early life ==
Wicks played high school football at Perry Academy. Wicks earned player of the year honors as a senior and earned first-team and all-state honors as well as totaling 643 yards on 22 receptions for 16 touchdowns. In his career, Wicks totaled four punt returns for scores and 22 interceptions.

== College career ==
Wicks enrolled at West Virginia University in 2003. Wicks played backup spur safety in 2004 as a redshirt freshman. Wicks recorded 14 tackles for the season and a 34-yard interception returned for a touchdown against Virginia Tech. Wicks also earned three tackles in the win against Temple University.

As a redshirt sophomore in 2005, Wicks played backup to all-conference safeties Mike Lorello and Jahmile Addae. Even though playing backup, Wicks earned second-team all-Big East honors. Wicks totaled 61 tackles for the year and scored West Virginia's first score of the year: a 31-yard interception return against Syracuse University, also totaled four tackles and a sack against the Orange. Wicks forced a Wofford fumble and an eight-yard sack. Wicks forced a Maryland fumble, seven tackles against East Carolina University, eight tackles against Virginia Tech, and nine tackles against Louisville. Wicks also won the game for West Virginia against Louisville, by tackling Louisville quarterback Brian Brohm on the two-point conversion in the 3rd overtime. Wicks was the leading tackler against Cincinnati and forced a fumble. Wicks ended the regular season with a key 4th quarter interception against the South Florida Bulls. Wicks recorded three tackles and recovered a fumble against the Georgia Bulldogs in the Sugar Bowl win. Wicks earned the Coaches Contribution Award, Defensive MVP against Syracuse and Cincinnati, and Big East honor roll against Syracuse.

At the beginning of the 2006 season, Eric Wicks and fellow-Mountaineer (as well as fellow Pittsburgh Metro player) Kevin "Boo" McLee made the Bronko Nagurski Trophy watch list. Although neither Wicks nor McLee won the award, both had stellar years. Wicks totaled 67 tackles and a team second-best three interceptions, to Quinton Andrews' four. Wicks' interceptions came to Eastern Washington, Mississippi State, and USF. Eric Wicks' interception against Mississippi State came in the endzone to save a touchdown. Against ECU, Wicks led the team with eight tackles, then eight tackles against Syracuse. In the Gator Bowl against Georgia Tech, Wicks recorded 5 tackles. Wicks was also named to the first-team all-Big East squad at the end of the season.

In the preseason of 2007, Wicks was selected as the #7 safety in the nation by Lindy's, was a second-team All-American selection, and was a preseason first-team all-Big East selection. He was also selected on the Jim Thorpe Award watchlist and Lott Trophy watchlist for defensive backs and defensive players, respectively. Against Marshall in the in-state rivalry game, Wicks recorded eight tackles as the Mountaineers won 48-23. In the third game of the season against Maryland, Wicks has two interceptions in the first half of the ballgame. Against ECU in the next game, Wicks recorded six tackles and a sack in the 48-7 win. In the 21-13 loss to USF, Wicks had five tackles, a pass deflection, and a fumble recovery. Against Mississippi State, Wicks had four tackles and a sack. In the Mountaineers' dramatic 38-31 win over Louisville, Wicks had possibly the greatest game of his career. He had a fumble recovery after John Holmes hit quarterback Brian Brohm, knocking the ball loose, that he took 44 yards for a touchdown. Then in the fourth quarter, Wicks had a diving interception that was key in the final six minutes of the game. Wicks' performance in the Louisville win earned his Big East Defensive Player of the Week honors. In the 66-21 victory over #20 Connecticut to clinch the Big East title, Wicks recorded 4 tackles and two pass deflections. At the end of the regular season, Wicks earned the team's Coaches Contribution Award. In Wick's final collegiate game, the 48-28 victory over Oklahoma in the Fiesta Bowl, Wicks had two tackles and two pass deflections. Wicks totaled 45 tackles on the season and three interceptions, and also a fumble return for a touchdown.

Eric Wicks finished his collegiate career with 187 career tackles, 9 interceptions and 3 Touchdowns.

== Professional career ==
=== Pre-draft ===
After the 2007 season, Wicks graduated and entered the 2008 NFL draft. He was not invited to the NFL Scouting Combine, though he did work out at the West Virginia's Pro Day on March 13, 2008. Wicks went undrafted in the NFL Draft, becoming an undrafted free agent.

=== Seattle Seahawks ===
Wicks was signed by the Seattle Seahawks after being undrafted in the 2008 NFL draft. He was placed on injured reserve on August 14 and was released by the team with an injury settlement four days later.
