= Rasheed Marshall =

American football player (born 1981)

No. 89
- Positions: Wide receiver, return specialist

Personal information
- Born: July 11, 1981 (age 45); Pittsburgh, Pennsylvania, U.S.
- Listed height: 6 ft 1 in (1.85 m)
- Listed weight: 190 lb (86 kg)

Career information
- High school: Brashear (Pittsburgh) VFMA (Wayne, Pennsylvania)
- College: West Virginia (2000–2004)
- NFL draft: 2005: 5th round, 174th overall pick

Career history
- San Francisco 49ers (2005); Pittsburgh Steelers (2007)*; St. Louis Rams (2007)*; Columbus Destroyers (2007–2008)
- * Offseason or practice squad member only

Awards and highlights
- Big East Offensive Player of The Year (2004)

Career NFL statistics
- Receptions: 1
- Receiving yards: -1
- Return yards: 575
- Stats at Pro Football Reference

Rasheed Malik Marshall (born July 11, 1981) is an American former professional football player who was a wide receiver in the National Football League (NFL). He played college football for West Virginia Mountaineers and was selected by the San Francisco 49ers in the fifth round of the 2005 NFL draft.

He was also a member of the Pittsburgh Steelers, St. Louis Rams and the Columbus Destroyers.

== Early life ==
Marshall prepped at Brashear High School in Pittsburgh, Pennsylvania. Marshall threw for over 3,000 yards in 2 years and was rated #10 quarterback in the nation by ESPN in 1998.

After graduation, he attended Valley Forge Military Academy in Wayne, Pennsylvania, where he played quarterback, cornerback, and free safety. He was a team captain in football and basketball.

== College career ==
In 2000, he was redshirted at West Virginia University. He saw action in only five games, missing eight weeks with a broken bone in his wrist. Marshall totaled 327 yards and two touchdowns and rushed for 210 yards.

In 2002, he took over the team's quarterback duties, racking up a 53.7 completion percentage for 1,616 yards, nine scores and five interceptions, also rushing 173 times for 666 yards (3.8 average) and 13 touchdowns.

In 2003, he was injured with a concussion for the season opener against Wisconsin, but ended up with a 50.7 completion percentage for 1,729 yards, 15 touchdowns and nine interceptions, also carrying 101 times for 303 yards (2.3 average) and four scores. He also gained 173 yards on six punt returns. Marshall had his career-high passing game that season, with 271 yards against Syracuse.

He was named Big East Offensive Player of the Year in his senior year, 2004, with a 59.5 percentage. He completed the year with 1,426 yards and 16 TD vs 6 INT passing while running for 684 yards and 4 TD on 130 carries. Marshall played the post-season Gridiron Classic as a receiver, which interested the pro scouts.

Rasheed Marshall totaled 5,558 yards passing with 45 touchdowns and 26 interceptions for his career at West Virginia. Only Marc Bulger, Geno Smith, Pat White, Chad Johnston and Oliver Luck threw for more yards in West Virginia records than Marshall's 5,558 yards, while Marshall's 45 touchdowns are fourth to Marc Bulger's 59, Pat White's 56 and Geno Smith's 56 at West Virginia. Rasheed's 2,040 yards rushing ranks third in school history for rushing yards for a quarterback, second to Major Harris and Pat White, respectively, while his 24 rushing touchdowns ranks second all-time at West Virginia for a quarterback behind Pat White. Marshall's 69 total touchdowns scored in his career was a school record, before Pat White broke it in 2007.

== Professional career ==
=== National Football League ===
Rasheed Marshall was selected in the fifth round, 174 overall by the San Francisco 49ers in the 2005 NFL draft. During training camp, Rasheed Marshall underwent the process of being converted from quarterback, his college position, to receiver. Rasheed Marshall recorded one reception for -1 yards and a rush for -7 yards. He played most of the 2005 NFL season as a kick returner, however. He registered 488 yards on kick returns in 2005, and 87 punt return yards.

He was released by the 49ers on September 2, 2006, and was then signed by his home-town team, the Pittsburgh Steelers on January 12, 2007. He was cut shortly after on August 8, of the same year. On August 15, 2007, Marshall was then picked up by the St. Louis Rams.

=== Arena Football League ===
On November 2, 2007, Rasheed Marshall left the Rams practice squad to join the Columbus Destroyers roster of the Arena Football League. Marshall was listed as a wide receiver. In the first game of the season, a 50–47 loss to the Colorado Crush, Marshall caught five passes for 68 yards and a 33-yard touchdown, his first score coming in his Arena League debut. He also had one rush for five yards. In the third game of the season, a 59–57 loss to the Cleveland Gladiators, Marshall recorded three receptions for 39 yards and two touchdowns. He followed up with three receptions for 36 yards and a touchdown and six kickoff returns for 130 yards and a touchdown in the 52–49 victory over the Utah Blaze. The game saw Marshall's first appearances as the team's kick returner. Marshall finished out the month of March with six receptions for 32 yards and 4 returns for 92 yards in a 44–47 loss to the Orlando Predators.

Marshall and the Destroyers opened up April with a 51–49 victory over the Tampa Bay Storm, where he recorded only three kick returns for 40 yards. In the following 62–44 loss to the New York Dragons, Marshall recorded 6 receptions for 92 yards with a score and six kickoff returns for 159 yards and a 57-yard touchdown return. After the game, Marshall ranked first in the AFL in kickoff return percentage with 21.3 yards per return, second in the league among rookies with 686 all-purpose yards, third among rookies with 42 points, and fourth among rookies with 24 receptions at that point in the season.

After missing the Philadelphia Soul game due to an injury, Marshall returned for the 48–45 loss to the Dallas Desperados, where he had 6 kick returns for 108 yards. Five weeks later in a 63–34 loss to the Georgia Force, Marshall returned eights kickoffs for 116 yards and had 3 receptions for 24 yards. In the following 63–60 loss to the Grand Rapids Rampage, Marshall had only two kick returns for 17 yards but did score a two-point conversion rush. Marshall finished out his rookie season with three kick returns for 57 yards.

Marshall finished out his rookie season with 31 receptions for 336 yards and five touchdowns. He also had seven rushes for 10 yards and a touchdown, and 54 returns for 941 yards and two touchdowns. Following his rookie campaign, Marshall's contract ended with the Destroyers and he entered the free agent market.

== See also ==
- List of Arena Football League and National Football League players
