= Lindy's Sports =

American sports magazine

Lindy’s Sports
- Publisher: Lindy Davis
- Founder: Lindy Davis
- Founded: 1982
- Country: United States
- Based in: Birmingham, Alabama
- Website: lindyssports.com

Lindy's Sports, also known as Lindy's, is a sports magazine. It was established in 1982, and is located in Birmingham, Alabama.

It covers the National Football League, Major League Baseball, the National Basketball Association, college football, the National Collegiate Athletic Association (NCAA) sports, hockey, and fantasy sports.

Lindy Davis is its publisher and founder, having started the magazine when he was a 26-year-old student at Samford University's Cumberland School of Law. In 2003, Lyn Scarbrough was its marketing director.

In October 2025, The Arena Group acquired Lindy’s Sports digital assets.
