= Steve Slaton =

American gridiron football player (born 1986)

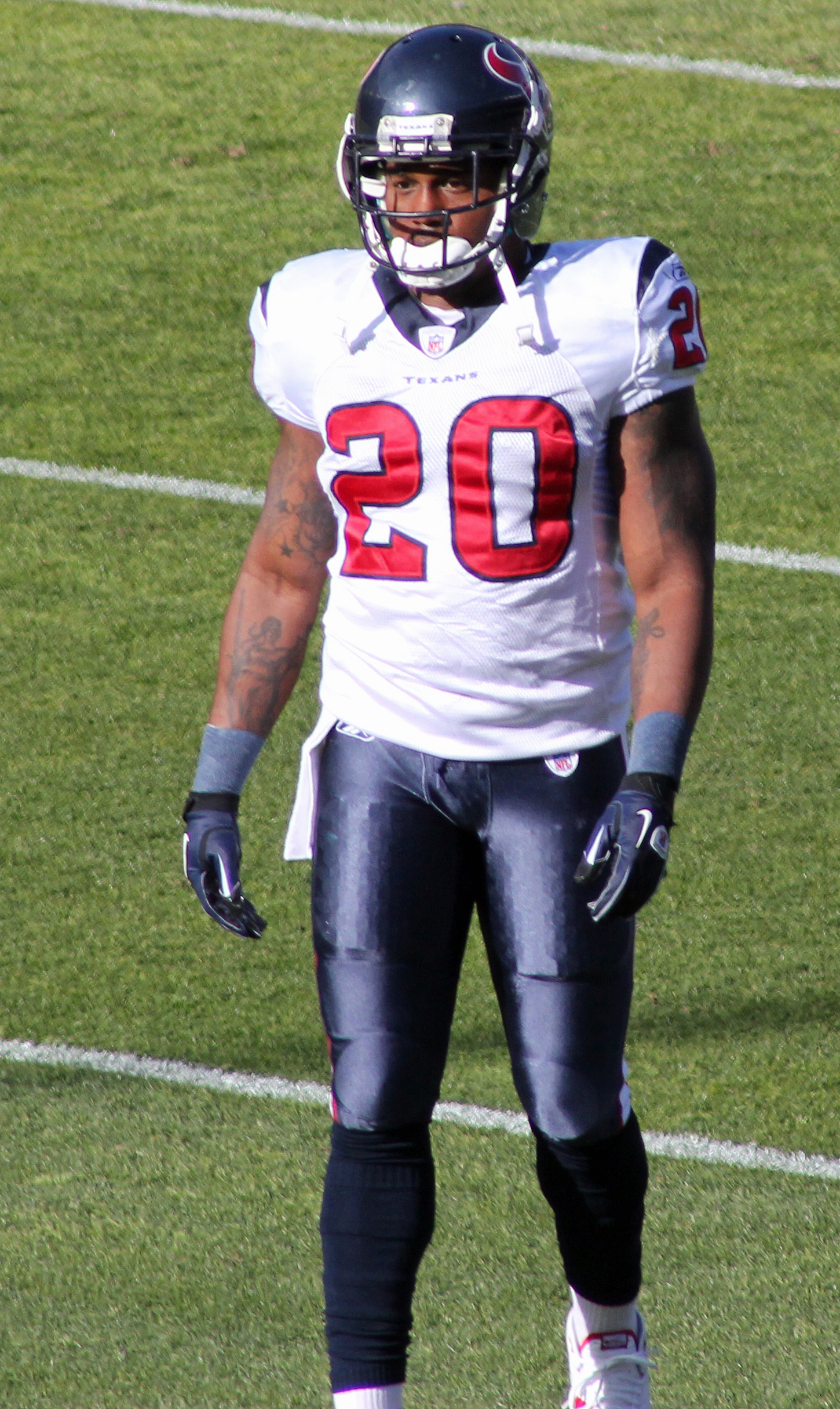
- Slaton with the Houston Texans in 2010

No. 20, 23
- Position: Running back

Personal information
- Born: January 4, 1986 (age 40); Levittown, Pennsylvania, U.S.
- Listed height: 5 ft 9 in (1.75 m)
- Listed weight: 199 lb (90 kg)

Career information
- High school: Conwell–Egan Catholic (Fairless Hills, Pennsylvania)
- College: West Virginia (2005–2007)
- NFL draft: 2008: 3rd round, 89th overall pick

Career history
- Houston Texans (2008–2011); Miami Dolphins (2011); Toronto Argonauts (2014)

Awards and highlights
- Unanimous All-American (2006); 2x First-team All-Big East (2006, 2007); Freshman All-American (2005); Big East Rookie of the Year (2005); Sugar Bowl MVP (2006)

Career NFL statistics
- Rushing yards: 1,896
- Rushing average: 4.3
- Rushing touchdowns: 18
- Receptions: 100
- Receiving yards: 808
- Receiving touchdowns: 5
- Stats at Pro Football Reference

Career CFL statistics
- Rushing yards: 510
- Rushing average: 5.4
- Rushing touchdowns: 1
- Receptions: 46
- Receiving yards: 388
- Receiving touchdowns: 4
- Stats at CFL.ca (archived)
- College Football Hall of Fame

Steve Slaton (born January 4, 1986) is an American former professional football player who was a running back in the National Football League (NFL). He played college football for the West Virginia Mountaineers, earning unanimous All-American honors in 2006. He was chosen by the Houston Texans in the third round of the 2008 NFL draft. Slaton also played for the NFL's Miami Dolphins and the Toronto Argonauts of the Canadian Football League (CFL). He was inducted into the College Football Hall of Fame in 2025.

== Early life ==
Slaton was born in Yardley, Pennsylvania. He was one of six children of Carl Slaton and Juanita Tiggett-Slaton. Until first grade, congestion in his ears rendered Slaton completely deaf at times. In fifth grade, his sister died of leukemia.

Slaton attended Immaculate Conception Elementary School, from kindergarten until eighth grade. During his attendance he was part of the track team.

Playing for Conwell–Egan Catholic High School in Fairless Hills, Pennsylvania, Slaton made the varsity football team as a freshman. He was named captain as a senior, was the most valuable player of the Philadelphia Catholic League, and was a four-year all-conference selection. As a senior, he rushed for 1,836 yards and 26 touchdowns. He was a first team all-state as a junior and senior. He rushed for more than 6,000 career yards and 73 touchdowns, setting five school records. Slaton was invited to, but did not participate in, the annual Big 33 Football Classic.

Slaton was also a track star in high school. He participated in various sprint events, and at one point recorded the sixth-best long jump across all high schools in the United States in 2004.

Slaton received offers to go to college from North Carolina, Maryland and Rutgers, but chose West Virginia, but mainly as a defensive back. Slaton had originally chosen Maryland for his college, but they ended up passing a scholarship on him, instead going with Morgan Green.

== College career ==
Slaton enrolled at West Virginia University, where he played for coach Rich Rodriguez's West Virginia Mountaineer football team from 2005 to 2007.

=== 2005 season ===
Slaton began his true freshman year as the fourth string running back. He saw his first action in the second game of the season, versus Wofford. After not getting any carries the next two games, he led the team with 90 yards rushing on eleven carries against #3 Virginia Tech. Slaton got his first ever start of his career in the next win against Rutgers, rushing for 139 yards and a touchdown.

Slaton had one of the most memorable games in WVU football history in the next game versus Louisville. After trailing 17–0 at Halftime, Slaton and the Mountaineers rallied from a 24-7 4th Quarter deficit to win the game 46–44 in triple overtime. After making an onside kick that led to the tying score, the Mountaineers headed into overtime with the Cardinals. Slaton finished the game with 188 yards on 31 carries and five rushing touchdowns. Slaton also had his first receiving touchdown of the season. His six touchdowns are a WVU and Big East record. He was named the Walter Camp, USA Today, and Rivals.com national player of the week and was also named the Big East player of the week. Slaton added 71 yards on 17 carries in a nationally televised Big East game with Connecticut, but Slaton left the game early after an injury to his wrist.

Slaton had another 100-yard performance, against Cincinnati, gaining 129 yards on 25 carries and scoring four touchdowns. Slaton scored three more touchdowns (two rushing, one receiving) in the next game, against Pitt. Slaton had 179 yards rushing on 34 carries as West Virginia beat Pitt, 45–13. In the final Big East game of the season, Slaton had 86 yards on 28 carries and one touchdown against the South Florida Bulls. West Virginia finished the regular season 10–1 and 7–0 in the Big East, earning the school a bid in the Nokia Sugar Bowl, while Slaton finished the season with 1,128 yards on 205 attempts with 17 touchdowns.

WVU defeated the University of Georgia Bulldogs in the 2005 Nokia Sugar Bowl on January 2, 2006. Slaton was named the Sugar Bowl MVP, gaining a new Sugar Bowl record of 204 yards on 26 carries and scoring three touchdowns. His game was highlighted by a pair of 52-yard touchdown runs. Slaton's 204 yards were not only a Sugar Bowl record, but the second most rushing yards ever in a BCS game. In a May 19, 2008, ranking, ESPN ranked Slaton's performance in the 2006 Sugar Bowl as the #5 best ever in a BCS bowl game.

=== 2006 season ===
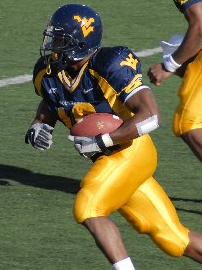
Slaton during the 2006 season

Slaton recorded his second straight 200-yard performance by putting up 203 yards on 33 carries and two touchdowns against instate rival Marshall in the first game of his sophomore season. Playing only the first two series of the Eastern Washington game, Slaton was still able to get 105 yards on only eight carries and scoring two touchdowns. Slaton performed in front of a national audience while gaining 149 yards in the first quarter alone against Maryland, finishing the game with 195 yards on 21 carries and adding another two touchdowns. Slaton helped the highly ranked Mountaineers to their fourth win of the season by gaining 80 yards on 24 carries against East Carolina.

Slaton finished with 185 yards on 26 carries and scored his seventh touchdown of the season, against Mississippi State, as the Mountaineers moved to 5–0 on the season. In the first Big East game of the season, against the Syracuse Orangemen, Slaton carried the ball 20 times for 163 yards, including a 52-yard touchdown run. On a Friday night game in front of a national audience against the Connecticut Huskies, Slaton carried the ball nineteen times for 128 yards, including a career-high 56-yard touchdown run.

Slaton finished with 156 yards and a touchdown on 18 carries in a 44–34 loss to Louisville. Slaton had two costly fumbles on consecutive snaps to start the third quarter. Slaton sat out the rest of the third because he was unable to grip the ball after taking a helmet to his elbow. In the ninth game of the season, Slaton exploded for runs of 65 and 63 yards to help WVU bounce back and beat Cincinnati 42–24, finishing with 148 yards and two touchdowns on just 12 carries. In the 99th meeting of the Backyard Brawl against Pitt, Slaton became the first Mountaineer to ever have more than 100 yards rushing (215) and 100 yards receiving (130) in the same game, also having two rushing and two receiving touchdowns. The 215 yard performance, which was a career-high, came on 23 carries and his 130 yards receiving. In the final regular season game, in front of a national audience, Slaton helped lead the Mountaineers to a 41-39 triple overtime victory against Rutgers. Slaton gained 112 yards on 23 carries and scored two touchdowns, including one in overtime.

Slaton finished the season with 1,744 yards on 248 carries with 16 touchdowns, despite a wrist injury all season. Slaton's 1,744 yards ranked third in the nation, while his average yards per run was ninth and his touchdown total was tied for eighth. His yardage was a West Virginia rushing record for a season, breaking Avon Cobourne's record of 1,710 yards, and was 22nd in West Virginia's record book for most total offense in a season. Slaton's 360 receiving yards are the second most in a season by a running back in school history as well, behind legendary fullback Jim Braxton's 565 yards, while his 27 receptions were tied for third most by a back in a season. Slaton's 2,104 yards from scrimmage is a West Virginia season record as well. In the season, Slaton and quarterback Pat White combined for 2,963 yards and 34 rushing touchdowns. They also combined for 4,978 total yards and 49 total touchdowns together on the season, the second-best output between the two in their three-year career together.

=== 2007 season ===
In the first game of the season against Western Michigan, Slaton struggled rushing early as the Broncos keyed in on him, but ended with 109 rushing yards and three touchdowns and 61 receiving yards on two receptions and a touchdown as the Mountaineers won 62–24. In the second week of the season, Slaton had 146 yards on 24 carries and touchdown runs of one yard and 18 yards while the Mountaineers beat Marshall 48–23 in front of the largest crowd ever at Joan C. Edwards Stadium, in Huntington, West Virginia. In this game, Slaton became the third Mountaineer to surpass 3,000 rushing yards in his career.

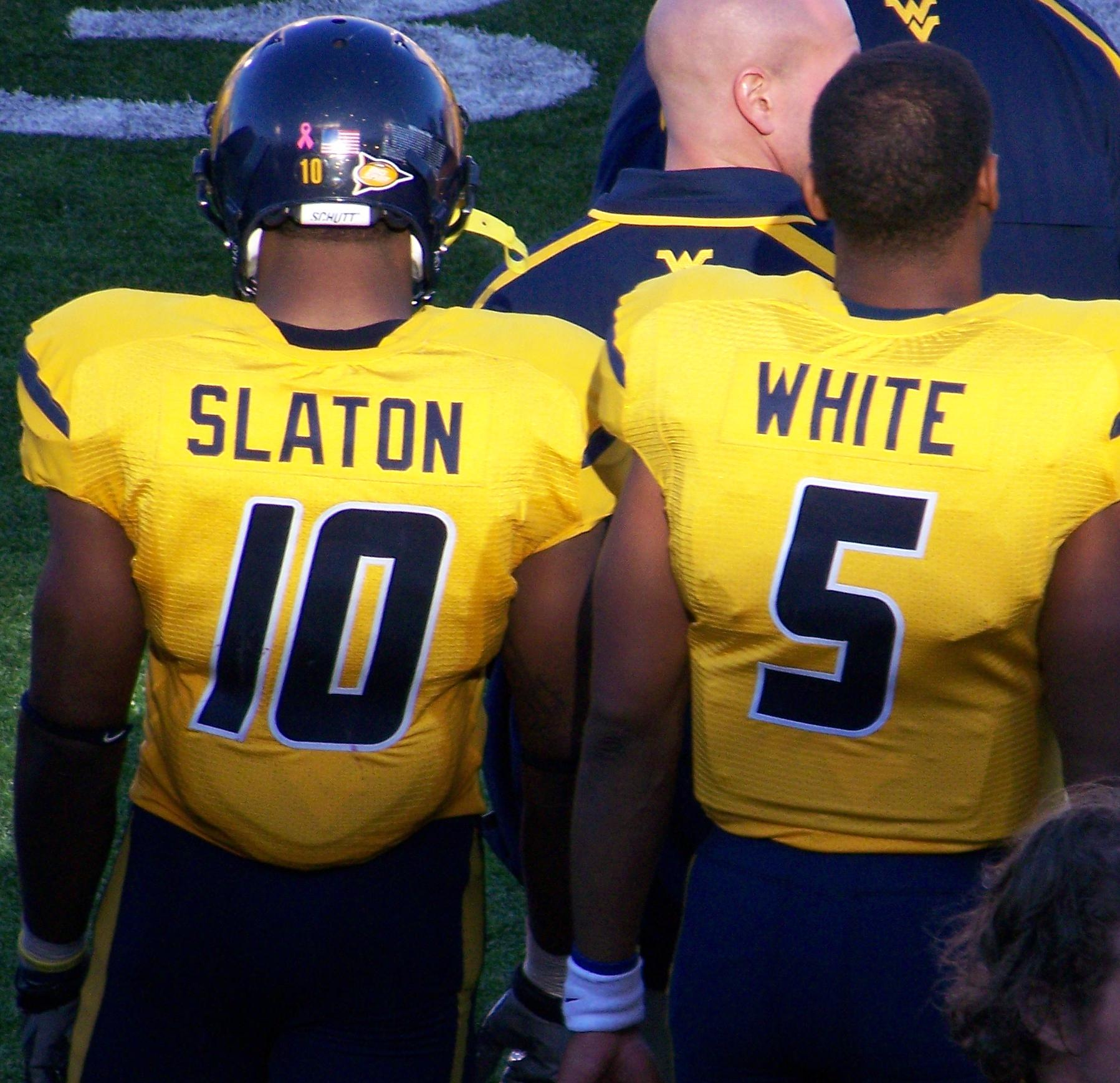
Steve Slaton (left) and Pat White on the sideline in 2007

In the third game of the season against Maryland, Slaton and the Mountaineers beat the Terps 31–14. Slaton finished the game with 26 carries for 137 yards and three touchdowns, including Slaton's longest run which was a 22-yard touchdown. Slaton earned the Wrangler Player of the Game honors presented by ESPN. In the following game against ECU, Slaton tied the school record scoring his 42nd rushing touchdown of his career and finished the game with 18 carries for 110 yards and a touchdown along with three receptions for 42 yards as the Mountaineers won 48–7. In the fifth game of the season, Slaton, for the third year in a row, was held under 100 yards rushing by South Florida—finishing the game with just 55 yards on 13 carries as WVU suffered their first loss of the season. Against Syracuse, Slaton had 69 yards on 15 carries and 51 yards on four receptions in the 55–14 win. The following game against Mississippi State, which was homecoming for the Mountaineers, Slaton rushed for 127 yards on 23 carries for one touchdown in the 38–13 win. Slaton's touchdown put him in the record books as the school's all-time leading scorer on the ground, passing Ira Rodgers and Avon Cobourne with 43 rushing touchdowns.

At #25 Rutgers, Slaton had 16 carries for 73 yards and three touchdowns but also had a reception for 51 yards on a screen pass. Against Louisville, Slaton had 17 carries for 60 yards but a touchdown in the 38–31 win. At that point, Slaton had been held under 100 yards rushing for four of the previous five games. The next week however, in the 28–23 win against #22 Cincinnati, Slaton earned the gameball from ESPN after rushing 23 times for 108 yards and a touchdown, also while catching three passes for a team-high 48 yards. Slaton's rushing touchdown set a school record for most career points scored by non-kickers with 318 points in his career and his 151 all-purpose yards placed him second on the career school list with 4,690 yards.

Slaton and the Mountaineers clinched the 2007 Big East Championship with a 66–21 win over #20 Connecticut. Slaton had a sub-par performance, rushing for 54 yards and two touchdowns on ten carries and grabbing two receptions for 11 yards. However, he surpassed 1,000 yards on the season on a 31-yard touchdown run for the third straight year; and by him surpassing 1,000 yards on the season, Slaton and Patrick White both surpassed 1,000 yards rushing for the second consecutive season, a feat that made them only the third pair in FBS history to ever do so. The next week however, the #2 Mountaineers fell to 5–7 Pitt in the Backyard Brawl 13–9 to end their National Championship hopes. In the loss, Slaton only carried the ball nine times for eleven yards. Slaton was named to second-team all-Big East and was also awarded the team's Coaches Contribution Award by former head coach Rich Rodriguez.

Slaton finished the regular season with 1,053 yards on 210 carries for a tying season-high 17 touchdowns. He also had 25 receptions for 348 yards and a touchdown. Slaton and quarterback Patrick White combined for 43 total touchdowns, more than 67 Division I-A teams that season. They also combined for 5,460 total yards, the best output by the two in their three-year career together. Their three-year career together ended with 13,433 total yards and 106 total touchdowns combined, cementing themselves as one of the greatest duos in NCAA history.

In the 48–28 Fiesta Bowl victory under interim head coach Bill Stewart, Slaton left the game early in the first quarter with a leg injury after rushing one time for -2 yards and catching one pass for two yards.

Slaton was inducted into the College Football Hall of Fame in 2025.

=== Career statistics ===
WVU		Rushing					Receiving					Kickoff returns					Defense
Season	Games	Att	Yds	Avg	Lg	TD	Rec	Yds	Avg	Lg	TD	Ret	Yds	Avg	Lg	TD	Solo	Assist	Tackle
2005	10	205	1,128	5.5	52	17	12	95	7.9	19	2	0	0	0.0	0	0	0	0	0
2006	13	248	1,744	7.0	65	16	27	360	13.3	67	2	0	0	0.0	0	0	2	0	2
2007	12	211	1,051	5.0	58	17	26	350	13.5	51	1	3	47	15.6	26	0	0	0	0
Total	35	644	3,923	5.8	65	50	65	805	11.5	67	5	3	47	15.6	26	0	2	0	2

=== Awards and honors ===
2005

- Named Walter Camp, USA Today, Rivals.com national player of the week and the Big East player of the week for the October 15, 2005, game against Louisville.
- Named first-team freshman All-America by Rivals.com, second team The Sporting News, Collegefootballnews.com, Scout.com.
- Named as the Big East rookie of the year, the ECAC rookie of the year, and second team All-Big East his freshman season.
- Named 2006 Nokia Sugar Bowl MVP after rushing for 204 yards on 26 carries and scoring three touchdowns in a 38–35 WVU victory.

2006

- Slaton, QB Pat White, and FB Owen Schmitt were featured on one of the six regional covers of the 8/21/06 issue of Sports Illustrated, as part of their "Big Men On Campus" article and their 2006-2007 college football season preview. Slaton was named West Virginia's "Big Man On Campus" in the same issue.
- Slaton and White were featured on the cover of an Athlon Sports 2006 magazine.
- Named Big East Player of the Week following the Marshall game on September 2, 2006.
- Slaton was named as a semi-finalist for the 2006 Maxwell Award, which is presented to the Collegiate Player of the Year.
- Slaton was named as one of ten players to watch for the 2006 Walter Camp Foundation Player of the Year.
- Slaton was named as a finalist for the 2006 Doak Walker Award.
- Slaton was named as a Football Writers of America All-American, an American Football Coaches Association All-American, a First Team AP All-American, a The Sporting News All-American, to the Scout.com First Team All-American and All-Big East Team, All Big East First Team, first team Walter Camp All-American, to the ECAC D-I All-Star team, and second team All-American by SI.com for the 2006 season.
- Slaton finished 4th in the 2006 Heisman Trophy race behind Troy Smith, Darren McFadden and Brady Quinn. Slaton finished with 6 1st place votes, 51 2nd place votes, and 94 3rd place votes for 214 total points.
- Finished tied for 4th in the AP Player of the Year in 2006.
- Slaton was named the 2006 Scout.com Big East Offensive Player of the Year.
- Named the Outstanding Amateur Athlete of the Year by the Philadelphia Sports Writers Association.

2007

- Slaton was featured on the cover of a Sporting News Big East and ACC college football magazine.
- Slaton was featured on the cover of a July 10, 2007, USA Today Sports Weekly magazine.
- Slaton was featured on Sports Illustrated's College Football Preview edition before the 2007 season. At the conclusion of the season, SI.com rated his cover the #1 most popular cover of 2007.
- Slaton and Pat White were featured on the cover of a 2007 pre-season Athlon Sports magazine.
- Slaton was selected for the Playboy, Athlon, and Lindy's All-American team for the preseason.
- Slaton was a consensus preseason First-team All-Big East selection.
- SI.com named Slaton one of the most fun athletes to watch, comparing his running style to Walter Payton.
- Slaton started the 2007 season ranked #2 on ESPN's Heisman Watch list posted on August 13, 2007.
- Slaton and teammate Pat White were named to the Maxwell Award watch list.

2025

- College Football Hall of Fame inductee

=== Records ===
Game

- Most touchdowns scored in a single game by a WVU player – 6 (October 15, 2005, vs. Louisville)
- Tied with Willis McGahee with the most touchdowns and points scored by a Big East player – 6 touchdowns, 36 points. (October 15, 2005, vs. Louisville)
- Most rushing yards in a Sugar Bowl game – 204
- First Mountaineer to ever have 100 yards rushing (215) and 100 yards receiving (130) in the same game.
- Slaton and White became only the third tandem in NCAA D-I history to both rush for 200+ yards in the same game. (November 16, 2006, vs. Pittsburgh)
- Second most points scored in a single game by a WVU player – 36 (October 15, 2005, vs. Louisville)

Season

- Most rushing yards in a season in WVU history – 1,744
- Most all purpose yards in a season in WVU history – 2,104
- Tied for most consecutive 100-yard rushing games in WVU history with six.
- Most rushing yards in Big East history by a true freshman (3rd most by any freshman) – 1,128 yards
- Ranks first (19) and third (18) for most touchdowns (rushing and receiving) in a season
- Ranks second in WVU history for most receiving yards by a running back – 360
- Ranks third for freshman rushing in WVU history – 1,128 yards
- Ranks third in WVU history for most receptions by a running back – 27
- Ranks fourth (17) and sixth (16) for most rushing touchdowns in a season.
- Finished fourth in rushing yards per game(134.15), second in all-purpose yards per game (161.85), thirds in rushing yards (1,744), ninth in yards per carry (7.0), eight in rushing touchdowns (16), and seventh in touchdowns scored (18) in the nation during the 2006 season.
- Ranks sixth in WVU history in rushing attempts in a season – 248
- Finished seventh in points scored (144), sixth in touchdowns scored (19), and sixth in rushing touchdowns (17) in the nation during the 2005 season.

Career

- Ranks first all-time in rushing touchdowns in WVU history – 50
- Ranks first all-time in total touchdowns in WVU history – 55
- Ranks first all-time in total points by a non-kicker in WVU history – 318
- Ranks second all-time in total 100-yard rushing games in WVU history – 21
- Ranks second all-time in all purpose yards in WVU history – 4,775
- Ranks second all-time in receiving yards by a running back in WVU history – 805
- Ranks second all-time in Big East history in total touchdowns – 53
- Ranks third all-time in rushing yards in WVU history – 3,923
- Ranks third all-time in rushing attempts in WVU history – 664
- Ranks third all-time in receptions by a running back in WVU history – 61
- Ranks third all-time in rushing yards in Big East history – 3,923
- Ranks third (tied) all-time in total 100-yard rushing games in Big East history – 21
- Third duo (along with Pat White) in FBS history to rush for 1,000 yards in consecutive seasons

Active career leaders at the end of his collegiate career

- First in most touchdowns – 50
- Seventh in most career yards – 3,923
- Seventh in most yards per game – 109
- Eighth in most yards per carry – 5.9
- Tenth in most career carries – 664
- Twelfth in most carries per game – 18.4

== Professional career ==
=== Pre-draft ===
On January 13, 2008, Slaton announced he would forgo his senior season at West Virginia and enter the 2008 NFL draft.

Slaton received an invite to the NFL Scouting Combine in February. His 33.5 vertical jump was 11th best by a running back. Slaton also worked out as a wide receiver in drills at the Combine. Slaton reported meeting with the Tampa Bay Buccaneers and Tennessee Titans at the NFL Combine.

West Virginia's Pro Day was March 13. At the Pro Day he ran a 4.45, despite weighing in at 199 lbs. He also ran a 2.51 20-yard dash and a 1.47 10-yard shuttle. In his three-cone drill, Slaton ran a 6.74, a 4.27 short shuttle, and a 35" vertical jump. Slaton also impressed many scouts with his receiving abilities, highlighted with a one-handed grab behind him on a "go route". Slaton's 6.74 three-cone drill time and 1.47 10-yard shuttle time was one of the best by any draft prospect at their respective Pro Days.

Pre-draft measurables
Height	Weight	Arm length	Hand span	40-yard dash	10-yard split	20-yard split	20-yard shuttle	Three-cone drill	Vertical jump	Broad jump	Bench press
5 ft 9 1/8 in (1.76 m)	197 lb (89 kg)	32 1/4 in (0.82 m)	8 3/4 in (0.22 m)	4.45 s	1.58 s	2.59 s	4.27 s	6.74 s	35.0 in (0.89 m)	9 ft 10 in (3.00 m)	19 reps
All values from NFL Combine/Pro Day

=== Houston Texans ===
Slaton was drafted by the Houston Texans of the National Football League (NFL) in the third round (89th overall) of the 2008 NFL Draft. On July 21, the Texans signed him to a multi-year contract.

In Slaton's first regular season game as a Texan, a 38–17 loss to the Pittsburgh Steelers, Slaton rushed 13 times for 43 yards and caught three passes for six yards. On September 21, 2008, Slaton scored his first touchdown in the NFL with a six-yard run against the Titans. He finished the game with 18 carries for 116 yards (6.4 average), including a 50-yard run, and four receptions for eight yards. Slaton totaled 104 yards in the first half alone, making him the second Texan ever to rush for 100 yards in the first half of a game, while his 50-yard run was the second-longest in franchise history. Following the performance, head coach Gary Kubiak named Slaton the starting running back. Slaton followed-up his first 100-yard rushing performance in his second start of his career, a 30–27 loss to the Jacksonville Jaguars, with 10 rushes for 33 yards and caught 8 passes for 83 yards, including a 30-yard touchdown reception from the wideout spot. Slaton finished the game with 116 total yards in his second career start. In Slaton's third career start, a 31–27 loss to the Indianapolis Colts, Slaton rushed for 93 yards and two touchdowns on 16 carries and also had a reception for three yards. Slaton's performance won him the NFL Rookie of the Week Award from NFLPlayers.com, and was nominated for the Diet Pepsi NFL Rookie of the Week Award for the third consecutive time, dating back to the Titans' game. In the following 29–28 victory over the Miami Dolphins, Slaton rushed 15 times for 58 yards and had a reception for 3 yards. In their consecutive victory against the Detroit Lions, Slaton totaled 80 yards and a touchdown on 17 carries and had three receptions for nine yards. In the 35–6 win over the Cincinnati Bengals, Slaton rushed 15 times for 53 yards with a touchdown. Slaton then had 12 rushes for 62 yards and eight receptions for 56 yards in the 28–21 loss to the Minnesota Vikings. The game marked his second 100-yard all-purpose game of the season with a total of 118 yards.

Slaton and the Texans lost the following game against the Baltimore Ravens 41–13. In the loss, Slaton rushed four times for seven yards and had two receptions for 17 yards in limited touches. However, Slaton rebounded in the following loss to the Colts, in which he posted career-high numbers—finishing the game with 14 carries for 156 yards and a touchdown. Slaton's yardage broke the franchise single-game rookie record, two yards shy of breaking Domanick Williams' all-time franchise record, while his 71-yard touchdown run was the longest rush in Texans' history. Slaton also led all rushers in the league with his performance. After the game, Slaton ranked first in most runs of 40 or more yards among the NFL's top 15 rushers, sixth in rushes of 20+ yards among the top 15, and his 5.1 yard per carry average was tied for second-most with DeAngelo Williams among the top 15. Then Slaton and the Texans defeated the Cleveland Browns 16–6, with Slaton leading the way with 21 rushes for 73 yards. Slaton and the Texans then defeated the Jaguars 30–17 on Monday Night. Slaton led the Texans' offensive assault with 21 carries for 130 yards with two touchdowns and was second on the team with two receptions for 52 yards—including a 46-yard screen reception. Slaton finished his first career Monday Night Football performance with 182 total yards of offense. For Slaton's Monday Night performance, he was awarded AFC Offensive Player of the Week for Week 14. Slaton went over 1,000 yards rushing on the season with his 120-yard, 26-carry performance against the Green Bay Packers in the 13th game of the season. Slaton also had 40 yards off of 3 receptions, totaling 160 yards of total offense. As the Texans then upset the Titans 13–12 the following week, Slaton posted a 100-yard performance off of 24 rushes.

In the following loss to the Oakland Raiders, Slaton rushed 18 times for 66 yards and caught five passes for 36 yards. It marked the first time in four games that he did not rush for over 100 yards (although he totaled 102 yards of offense), however he broke the franchise single-season record for rushing yards with 1,190 yards. In the final week of the season, Slaton's Texans were pitted against the Chicago Bears who had a talented rookie running back of their own in Matt Forte. Slaton rushed for 92 yards and a score to seal Houston's win. He ended his rookie season with 1,282 rushing yards, the most among rookie running backs and sixth in the NFL, behind only Adrian Peterson of the Vikings, Michael Turner of the Atlanta Falcons, DeAngelo Williams of the Carolina Panthers, Clinton Portis of the Washington Redskins, and Thomas Jones of the New York Jets.

Slaton began his sophomore season in the NFL as the starter for the Texans after the success of his rookie season. Behind Slaton were backs Ryan Moats and Chris Brown. In the off season, Slaton added to his frame by bulking up to 215 pounds from his 198 pounds when drafted. However, Slaton lost the short-yardage and goal-line situational carries to backup Chris Brown after the preseason by choice of Gary Kubiak.

In the opening game of the season, the Texans lost to the Jets 24–7 behind Slaton's nine carries for 17 yards (1.9 yard average) and 3 receptions for 35 yards—losing his first fumble of the season on a 17-yard reception. In the following win over the Titans, Slaton rushed for 34 yards on 17 carries and had 25 yards receiving on 3 catches, however Slaton fumbled twice in the game. Kubiak was openly critical of Slaton's play in the first two games of the season. However, in the third game Slaton rebounded with 76 yards rushing on 12 carries and 37 yards receiving on 2 catches.

In the fourth game of the season, a 29–6 victory over the Raiders, Slaton fumbled for the fourth time in four games. He was temporarily benched during the game, but rebounded with a 32-yard touchdown run—his first score of the season, finishing with 65 yards rushing and 24 yards receiving and another touchdown via a reception. In the following game, a loss to the Arizona Cardinals, Slaton rushed for 39 yards on 13 carries and caught 6 passes for 59 yards. In the press conference following the game, Kubiak expressed his displeasure with the running game and Slaton, saying, "If we've got to go out there and throw it all the time, that's what we'll do." On November 8, 2009, Slaton was benched in favor of Ryan Moats. On December 9, Slaton was put on the injured reserve due to a shoulder injury.

On September 27, 2011, Slaton was waived by the Texans.

=== Miami Dolphins ===
The Dolphins claimed him off waivers on September 28, 2011. On September 1, 2012, Slaton was released by the Dolphins.

After Matt Forte went down with an injury, Slaton worked out for the Bears on September 22, 2012, though the Bears ultimately signed Kahlil Bell. The Detroit Lions also expressed interest in Slaton.

=== Toronto Argonauts ===
Slaton signed with the Toronto Argonauts of the Canadian Football League on April 24, 2014. He played in 12 games, starting 6, in 2014, recording 510 rushing yards, one rushing touchdown, 46 receptions, 388 receiving yards, four receiving touchdowns and 71 kick return yards.

Slaton retired from professional football in May 2015.

=== NFL statistics ===
Source: NFL.com

		Rushing						Receiving					Fumbles	
Season	Team	GP	Att	Yds	Avg	Long	TD	Rec	Yds	Avg	Long	TD	Fum	Lost
2008	HOU	16	268	1,282	4.8	71	9	50	377	8.2	46	1	3	2
2009	HOU	11	131	437	3.3	32	3	44	417	9.5	38	4	7	5
2010	HOU	12	19	93	4.9	23	0	3	11	3.7	12	0	0	0
2011	HOU	3	7	20	2.9	13	0	1	6	6.0	6	0	0	0
2011	MIA	3	17	64	3.8	28	1	1	-2	-2.0	-2	0	0	0
Career		45	442	1,896	4.3	71	13	99	809	8.2	46	5	10	7

== Personal life ==
Slaton has two sons, and is married to his high school sweetheart, Kimberly Sierra. Slaton's favorite NFL player is Emmitt Smith, and his favorite musical artist is Jay-Z. His maternal grandmother was originally from the Philippines, and she met his maternal grandfather William while she was selling vegetables during World War II.

After retiring from football, Slaton enrolled in culinary school, where he worked for Houston chef Chris Shepherd at his restaurant, Underbelly (which is now closed). There, he helped prepare nutritious meals for several Houston Texans players.

== See also ==
- List of NCAA Division I FBS running backs with at least 50 career rushing touchdowns
- List of NCAA major college football yearly scoring leaders
