= Patrick White (disambiguation) =

Patrick White (1912–1990) was a Nobel Prize–winning Australian author.

Patrick or Pat White may refer to:

== Politicians ==
- Patrick White (judge) (c.1480–1561), Irish politician and judge
- Patrick White (politician) (1860–1935), Irish Member of Parliament for North Meath, 1900–1918

== Sportspeople ==
- Pat White (born 1986), American professional football and baseball player
- Pat White (rugby league), New Zealand footballer during 1950s and 1960s
- Patrick White (ice hockey) (born 1989), American ice hockey player

== Writers ==
- Pat White (before 1900—after 1937), American songwriter ("It's the Same Old Shillelagh", "I'm Leaving Tipperary")
- Patrick Franklin White (born 1981), Canadian journalist and author

== Others ==
- Patrick H. White (1832–1915), American Civil War Medal of Honor recipient
- Patrick White (bishop) (born 1942), Canadian Bishop of Bermuda

== See also ==
- Patricia White (disambiguation)
- Paddy Whyte (1894–1977), Australian politician in Queensland
