= West Virginia Mountaineers football =

American college football team

2026 West Virginia Mountaineers football team
- First season: 1891; 135 years ago
- Athletic director: Wren Baker
- Head coach: Rich Rodriguez; 2nd season of 2nd stint, 8th overall season, 63–32 (.663)
- Location: Morgantown, West Virginia
- Stadium: Milan Puskar Stadium (capacity: 60,000)
- NCAA division: Division I FBS
- Conference: Big 12
- Colors: Gold and blue
- All-time record: 790–539–45 (.591)
- Bowl record: 17–24 (.415)

National finalist
- Poll era: 1988

Conference championships
- SoCon: 1953, 1954, 1955, 1956, 1958, 1964, 1965, 1967 Big East: 1993, 2003, 2004, 2005, 2007, 2010, 2011
- Consensus All-Americans: 14
- Rivalries: Cincinnati (rivalry); Marshall (rivalry); Maryland (rivalry); Penn State (rivalry); Pittsburgh (rivalry); Syracuse (rivalry); Virginia Tech (rivalry)

Uniforms
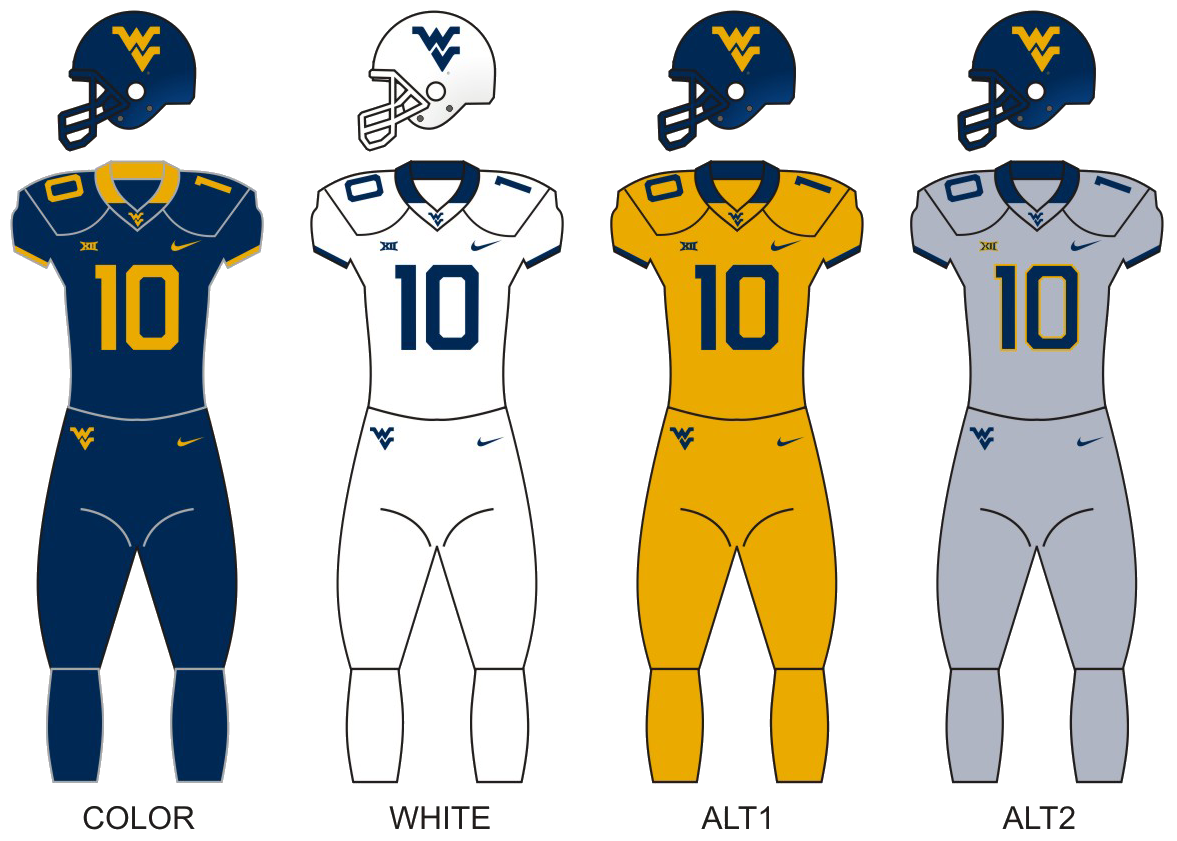
- Fight song: Hail, West Virginia
- Mascot: The Mountaineer
- Marching band: The Pride of West Virginia
- Outfitter: Nike
- Website: wvusports.com

The West Virginia Mountaineers football team represents West Virginia University (WVU) in the NCAA Division I Football Bowl Subdivision (FBS) of college football. West Virginia plays its home games at Milan Puskar Stadium on the campus of West Virginia University in Morgantown, West Virginia. The Mountaineers have won or shared a total of 15 conference championships, including eight Southern Conference titles and seven Big East Conference titles. The Mountaineers compete in the Big 12 Conference.

== History ==
=== Early history (1891–1949) ===
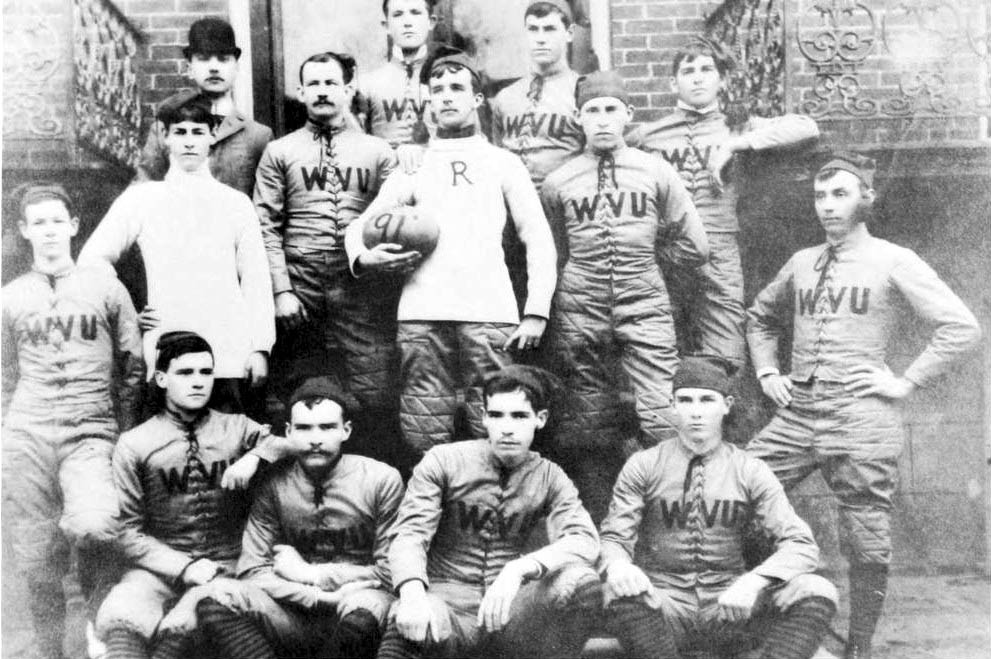
WVU's inaugural football team, 1891

The West Virginia University football program traces its origin back to November 28, 1891, when its first team fell to Washington & Jefferson 72–0 on a converted cow pasture. Despite its humble beginning, West Virginia enjoyed a 25–23–3 overall record prior to 1900, which proved to be a fruitful century of Mountaineer football. The early 1900s brought about early successes for the program, namely during the 1903 and 1905 seasons when WVU posted records of 7–1 and 8–1 respectively. WVU produced a 6–3 record in the 1904 season, despite losing to Penn State, Pitt, and Michigan by a combined score of 217–0. The 1908–20 period produced the four-year head coaching tenures of C.A. Lueder (1908–11) and Mont McIntire (1916–17, 1919–20), representing the longest coaching tenures during this early period of Mountaineer football. Lueder's Mountaineers produced a 17–13–3 record, while McIntire's teams produced the most success of any Mountaineer team prior to 1921, compiling a 24–11–4 record including an 8–2 finish in 1919.

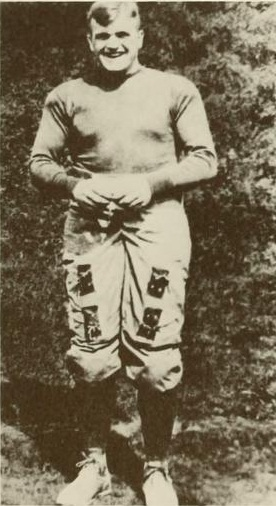
Ira Errett Rodgers, College Football Hall of Fame inductee

That same Mountaineer team also produced West Virginia's first ever Consensus All-American and potential College Football Hall of Fame inductee, Ira Errett Rodgers. Rodgers scored 19 touchdowns and kicked 33 extra points for WVU in 1919 season, leading the nation with 147 total points. Rodgers also threw 11 touchdown passes that season, an unheard of feat at the time and a Mountaineer record until 1949. The Mountaineers enjoyed their first period of success during the 1920s, coinciding with the successful coaching tenures of Clarence Spears (1921–24) and Ira Errett Rodgers (1925–30, 1943–45). Under the tutelage of Spears, West Virginia compiled a 30–6–3 record with its best performance coming in the 1922 season. The 1922 edition of the Mountaineers remains the only team in West Virginia history to produce an unbeaten season, finishing with a 10–0–1 mark. Spears's Mountaineers surrendered only 34 total points in 1922, posting six consecutive shutouts to finish the regular season. The 1922 season also produced notable victories against rival Pitt and against Gonzaga in the East-West Bowl, the program's first bowl game appearance. Offensive tackle Russell Meredith garnered First-Team All-American honors. In homage to the successes of the 1922 season, West Virginia University undertook construction of what became the first incarnation of Mountaineer Field.

The Mountaineers continued their success under Spears in posting subsequent one-loss seasons in 1923 (7–1–1) and in 1924 (8–1), with Spears departing the program for Minnesota thereafter. Ira Errett Rodgers replaced Spears and the Mountaineers posted an 8–1 record in 1925. After a 6–4 finish in 1926 and a 2–4–3 record in 1927, the program produced an 8–2 finish in 1928. Rodgers's first tenure as West Virginia coach ended with records of 4–3–3 in 1929 and 5–5 in 1930. Taking over for Rodgers in 1931 was Earle "Greasy" Neale, but his tenure was short-lived as the Mountaineers failed to produce a single winning season under his guise, going a combined 12–16–3 over Neale's three years as coach. Charles Tallman, an End who achieved All-American status with the Mountaineers in 1923 with the Mountaineers, replaced Neale in 1934 and produced immediate results as the program posted 6–4 records in 1934 and 1936. Although West Virginia posted a 3–4–2 record in 1935, the program produced an All-American in Joe Stydahar, an offensive tackle. "Jumbo Joe" later became both a College Football Hall of Fame and Pro Football Hall of Fame inductee. Despite his winning record, Tallman resigned after the 1936 season to pursue his career in law enforcement as Superintendent of the West Virginia State Police. Marshall Glenn picked up right where Tallman left off, leading West Virginia to an 8–1–1 record in 1937. The season concluded with an upset of Texas Tech in the 1938 Sun Bowl. Running back Harry Clarke led the way for the Mountaineers that season, rushing for a then school record 921 yards and 10 touchdowns. Glenn's success was short-lived, however, as subsequent WVU teams posted losing records of 4–5–1 in 1938 and 2–6–1 in 1939, leading to his ouster. West Virginia experienced a lag in success during much of the 1940s, producing only three winning seasons while witnessing the split coaching tenures of Bill Kern (1940–42, 1946–47) and the second appearance of Ira Errett Rodgers (1943–45). Under the direction of head coach Dudley DeGroot in the 1948 season, the Mountaineers returned to prominence with a 9–3 finish, adding another Sun Bowl victory to its resume with a 21–12 defeat of Texas Western (now known as UTEP). Despite that successful first season at the program's helm, DeGroot resigned after a disappointing 4–6–1 finish in 1949.

=== Art Lewis era (1950–1959) ===
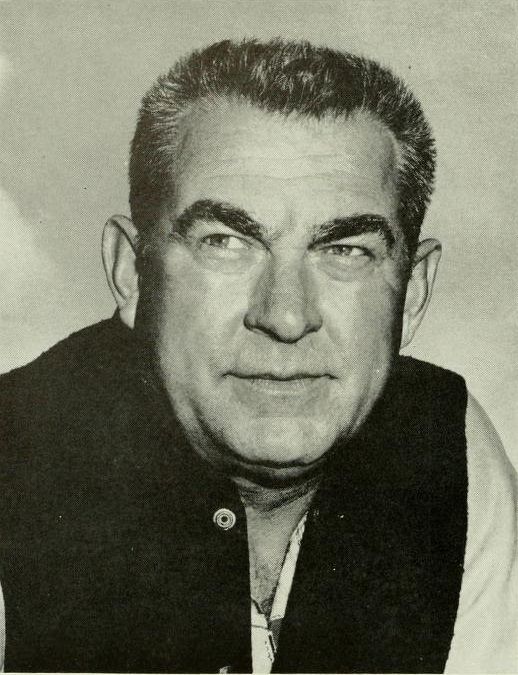
Art Lewis, WVU head coach (1950–59) and the program's 3rd all-time leader in wins (58).

When Art "Pappy" Lewis became West Virginia's head coach in 1950, he remarked that it was the job that he had always wanted. Known by his peers as an exceptional recruiter and by his players as a father figure, Lewis established a family-like atmosphere within the Mountaineer football program. Lewis's Mountaineer teams held true to form, experiencing their most consistent success during the 1950s as it ever had previously. After forgettable campaigns in 1950 and '1951, the 1952 season brought WVU its first winning season since 1948. The Mountaineers finished with a 7–2 record, highlighted by a 16–0 upset victory of No. 18 Pitt in Pittsburgh.

Beginning with the 1953 season, the Mountaineers would reel off three consecutive eight-win seasons and five Southern Conference (SoCon) championships in six seasons. In 1953, the Mountaineers finished with an 8–2 record, their first SoCon championship, a No. 10 ranking in the Associated Press (AP) Poll, and a berth in the Sugar Bowl with Georgia Tech. The 1954 edition of the Mountaineers also finished the regular season with an 8–1 mark, losing their only game to Pitt by a 13–10 score. The Mountaineers did not earn a bowl bid, however, despite winning their second consecutive SoCon title and earning a No. 12 ranking in the AP Poll. In 1955, the Mountaineers engineered yet another eight-win season and SoCon championship, but upset losses to Pitt and Syracuse doomed West Virginia's shot at a bowl bid. Despite its disappointing finish, WVU produced two All-American offensive linemen and future College Football Hall of Fame inductees in Bruce Bosley and Sam Huff. Bosley earned Consensus All-American status that season, becoming the first Mountaineer to do so since Ira Errett Rodgers in 1919.

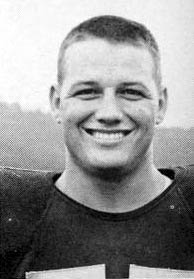
Sam Huff, WVU offensive guard (1952–55) and College Football Hall of Fame and Pro Football Hall of Fame inductee.

Despite finishing with a modest 6–4 record in 1956, West Virginia won its fourth consecutive SoCon title with a 5–0 record in conference play. The 1957 season resulted in a 7–2–1 record and a 3–0 mark in Southern Conference play. Although the Mountaineers once again compiled an undefeated SoCon record, they were not awarded the conference championship, as VMI earned the title with a 9–0–1 overall record and 6–0 record in SoCon play. In 1958, the Mountaineers had their first losing season in eight years, but their 4–0 record in SoCon play earned them a 5th conference title in six seasons. The 1958 season was the final season that West Virginia would win a conference championship under Lewis's tenure. The Mountaineers finished 3–7 in 1959, losing the final five games of the season by a combined score of 24–140. Lewis resigned as head coach afterward. Despite the program's drop off in success in his final two seasons as coach, Lewis produced 58 victories overall during his tenure at West Virginia, placing him fourth overall in the program's history.

=== Gene Corum era (1960–1965) ===
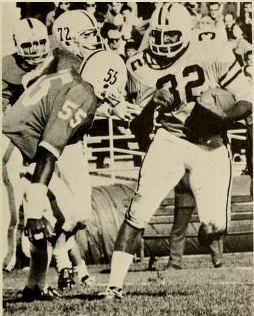
In 1966, Garrett Ford Sr. became the first Mountaineer to rush for 1,000 yards.

After Lewis's departure, the program hit an all-time low in 1960 under first-year head coach Gene Corum, posting its worst season to date: 0–8–2. The Mountaineers were simply outclassed by their opponents, being outscored 40–259 on the season. The Mountaineers rebounded, however, and by 1962 were back to their winning ways, posting an 8–2 record and 4–0 conference record. Despite their undefeated conference record, once again the SoCon crown eluded the Mountaineers in favor of the VMI Keydets and their 6–0 record in conference play. West Virginia did not have to wait long for its next SoCon title, however, as the program won the title in the 1964 and 1965 seasons consecutively. The Mountaineers finished 7–4 in 1964 and participated in the Liberty Bowl against Utah, West Virginia's first bowl game in 11 years as well as the first major college football bowl game ever played indoors and to be broadcast nationwide in the United States. Corum's tenure ended thereafter, posting a 29–30–2 record over his six seasons as head coach. Corum's legacy went well beyond wins and losses, however, as he integrated WVU football in 1963 with the program's first African-American recruits in Roger Alford and Dick Leftridge.

=== Jim Carlen era (1966–1969) ===
Following the 1965 season, Jim Carlen took over for Corum as head coach. After a 3–5–2 finish in 1966, Carlen guided the Mountaineers to their 8th and final SoCon championship in 1967. West Virginia left the Southern Conference thereafter, participating as an independent until 1991. Carlen's Mountaineers would produce subsequent winning seasons in 1968 and 1969, posting records of 7–3 and 10–1, respectively. The 1969 edition of the Mountaineers was the most successful West Virginia team since the 1922 season. Not only did the Mountaineers win 10 games, but they earned their first bowl game victory since 1948 with a Peach Bowl victory over No. 19 South Carolina, as well as a No. 18 final ranking in the Coaches Poll. The dynamic rushing tandem of running back Bob Gresham (1,155 yards and 9 touchdowns) and fullback Jim Braxton (843 yards, 12 touchdowns) led the Mountaineers. Gresham became the second Mountaineer to ever rush for more than 1,000 yards (Garrett Ford, Sr. was the first with 1,068 yards in 1966). At the conclusion of the 1969 season, Carlen departed West Virginia for Texas Tech. The Mountaineers responded by hiring Bobby Bowden.

=== Bobby Bowden era (1970–1975) ===
Jim Braxton (No. 44), WVU fullback (1968–70) and 1970 First-Team All-American.

It appeared that the Bobby Bowden era of Mountaineer football could not have begun more smoothly early in the 1970 season, or so it seemed. The Mountaineers were 4–1 to start the season and led arch rival Pitt 35–8 at halftime in week six. What transpired was one of the most infamous collapses in Backyard Brawl and West Virginia football history. The Mountaineers surrendered 28 unanswered points, losing to the Panthers 36–35 and leading Bowden to remark that he had "embarrassed the whole state of West Virginia" in the process. Despite the disappointment of the Pitt defeat, West Virginia went on to finish the 1970 season with an 8–3 record. Fullback Jim Braxton and linebacker Dale Farley earned All-American honors.

The Mountaineers continued their winning ways under Bowden in 1971 and 1972, posting records of 7–4 and 8–4 respectively. The 1972 West Virginia team earned the program's first trip back to a bowl game in three years, participating once again in the Peach Bowl against North Carolina State. The season also witnessed the offensive prowess of running back Kerry Marbury and wide receiver Danny Buggs. Marbury ran for 16 touchdowns in 1972, a record that remained unbroken until 2002. Buggs recorded 35 receptions for 791 yards and eight touchdowns, ran for four touchdowns, and returned two punts for touchdowns to amass 14 total touchdowns.

Bobby Bowden, West Virginia head coach (1970–1975)

The 1973 and 1974 seasons, however, were not successful campaigns for the Mountaineers, as they finished with records of 6–5 and 4–7. Despite the disappointment of those seasons, Danny Buggs earned All-American status for his contributions in both campaigns. The 1975 season was successful as the Mountaineers compiled a 9–3 record, a 13–10 Peach Bowl victory over North Carolina State, and a final ranking of No. 17 in the Coaches Poll and No. 20 in the AP Poll. Additionally, the Mountaineers upset the No. 20 Pitt Panthers 17–14 on a game-winning field goal in the closing seconds in yet another memorable chapter of the Backyard Brawl. Bowden later described the victory as one of the most exciting ones of his coaching career. Following the 1975 season, Bowden left WVU to become the head coach at Florida State, where he would become the second winningest coach in NCAA Division I-A/FBS history. In just six seasons with the Mountaineers, Bowden produced a 42–26 record, good for fifth all-time in the program. Bowden's departure not only signaled the end of his tenure at West Virginia, but to the end of WVU's winning ways in the 1970s.

=== Frank Cignetti era (1976–1979) ===
Danny Buggs, First-Team All-American in the 1973 and 1974 seasons.

Under the direction of Frank Cignetti, the Mountaineers endured four consecutive losing seasons. West Virginia completed the 1976 season with a 5–6 record, losing four of its final six games. The disappointment of 1976 was realized again the following season, as the Mountaineers posted another 5–6 finish in 1977. After a promising 4–1 start to the season, including an upset road victory over No. 11 Maryland, WVU lost five of its final six games. The Mountaineers finished 2–9 in 1978, being outscored 364–167. It was later revealed that Cignetti had suffered from a rare form of cancer during the season, nearly losing his life on the operating table during a procedure to remove his spleen in the winter of 1978. The 1979 season was Cignetti's final with the program. The Mountaineers produced another 5–6 finish, losing their first three games and later dropping three out of their final four games.

Despite the program's losing seasons during Cignetti's tenure, Cignetti managed to land prized recruit and future Consensus All-American linebacker Darryl Talley, as well as standout quarterback and future Athletic Director Oliver Luck and running back Robert Alexander. Cignetti's coaching staffs also consisted of some of the best coaches in college football, including Nick Saban, Joe Pendry and Rick Trickett (who, along with Rich Rodriguez, was later credited as an innovator in utilizing the zone blocking scheme in conjunction with the run-based spread offense at WVU). However, with a 17–27 record during his four years with the program, and in having to follow in the footsteps of the great Bobby Bowden (who later became the second all-time leader in victories amongst NCAA FBS coaches), Cignetti's legacy is one of the most conflicted in the program's history.

=== Don Nehlen era (1980–2000) ===
Darryl Talley and Oliver Luck celebrate WVU's 1981 Peach Bowl victory.

In the wake of Frank Cignetti's firing, the West Virginia Athletic Department determined that a full rebuild was in order. On December 10, 1979, West Virginia introduced Don Nehlen as its new head coach, the 30th coach in the program's history. Coinciding with Nehlen's hire was the construction of the second incarnation of Mountaineer Field, the program's current home stadium. Nehlen brought several changes to the Mountaineer football program, including a new logo and color scheme that remains in use to this day. The result was consistency and success for the program during his two-decade tenure at West Virginia. After a 6–6 campaign in 1980, Nehlen's 1981 Mountaineer team produced the first of 15 winning seasons under his direction. It also marked the first of three consecutive nine-win seasons and four consecutive bowl game appearances for the Mountaineers. Led by senior quarterback Oliver Luck's 2,448 yards passing and 16 touchdowns, the 1981 team posted a 9–3 record and earned a trip back to the Peach Bowl, where they defeated the Florida Gators 26–6. WVU also finished ranked in the polls for the first time since 1975, coming in at No. 17 and No. 18 in the AP and Coaches Polls, respectively.

The 1982 Mountaineers experienced similar success. Sparked by their come-from-behind upset victory over No. 9 Oklahoma to open the season, the Mountaineers finished with a 9–2 record, remaining ranked in the AP poll throughout the season en route to a Gator Bowl berth with Bobby Bowden and Florida State. Despite its Gator Bowl loss, West Virginia once again finished the season 9–3 and ranked 19th in both final polls. The team also produced the program's first Consensus All-American since 1955 in senior linebacker Darryl Talley. The Mountaineers won their first six games at the outset of the 1983 season, attaining a No. 4 ranking in the AP Poll. With a 41–23 upset loss to 1983 in week 8, however, West Virginia's hopes of an undefeated season collapsed. WVU lost three of its final five regular season games before defeating Kentucky in the Hall of Fame Classic to finish the season at 9–3. It was the third consecutive season for WVU to finish ranked, coming in at No. 16 in both the AP and Coaches Polls. Quarterback Jeff Hostetler led the offensive attack with 2,345 yards passing and 16 touchdowns, while Kicker Paul Woodside received All-American honors in converting 21 of 25 field goal attempts and all 37 of his extra point attempts en route to a team-leading 100 points.

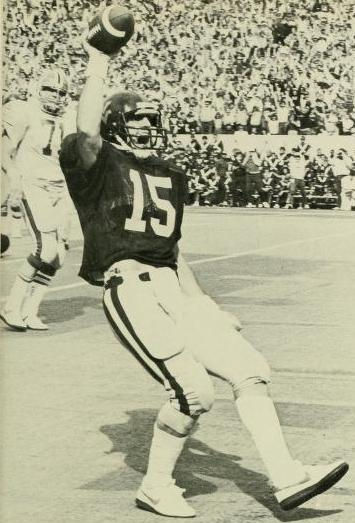
Jeff Hostetler, WVU quarterback (1982–83) and 1983 Heisman Trophy candidate.

Although the 1984 season had all off the makings of a memorable one for West Virginia, the Mountaineers experienced another letdown. WVU started the season with a 7–1 record, posting an upset victory over No. 4 Boston College and its first victory over Penn State in 25 meetings along the way. The Mountaineers were upset in each of their final three regular season games, however, losing to Virginia, Rutgers and Temple. WVU rebounded to defeat Texas Christian in the Bluebonnet Bowl, finishing the season at 8–4 with a No. 21 ranking in the final Coaches poll. The Mountaineers also produced three All-Americans in return specialist Willie Drewrey, kicker Paul Woodside, and tight end Rob Bennett. After four consecutive seasons of bowl berths and finishes in at least one of the polls, West Virginia went on a two-year drought in 1985 and 1986, finishing those seasons with records of 7–3–1 and 4–7 (Nehlen's first of only four losing seasons) respectively. The shortcomings of those seasons came to a head in 1987, where the Mountaineers endured a season of growing pains and near-misses. Despite a 1–3 start, West Virginia rallied to finish the regular season at 6–5 with four of its five losses coming by deficits of 5 points or less. Freshman quarterback Major Harris led the way for the Mountaineers, compiling 16 total touchdowns and providing glimpses of what was to come in his illustrious collegiate career. The season culminated in a 35–33 loss to No. 11 Oklahoma State in the Sun Bowl, a game in which the Mountaineers led 24–14 at halftime and lost on a failed two-point conversion attempt with 1:13 remaining.

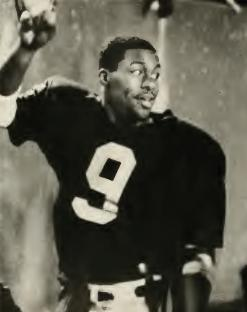
Major Harris, WVU quarterback (1987–89), two-time Heisman Trophy candidate and College Football Hall of Fame inductee.

The 1988 edition of the Mountaineers achieved an undefeated regular season, compiling 11 wins for the first time in its history. The success of the regular season culminated in West Virginia's first and only trip to a National Championship Game in its history, where the No. 3 Mountaineers met No. 1 Notre Dame in the Fiesta Bowl. Notre Dame went on to win 34–21 and claimed the national championship. West Virginia finished the 1988 campaign ranked No. 5 in both the AP and Coaches Polls. Major Harris compiled 610 yards rushing, 1,915 yards passing, and 20 total touchdowns on the season. Coming off of its first ever 11-win season and with junior Major Harris returning to lead a potent offense, West Virginia entered the 1989 season with high expectations and a No. 17 ranking in the AP Poll. The Mountaineers raced to a 4–0 record and to No. 9 in the AP Poll. In Week 5 against No. 10 Pitt, however, West Virginia fell victim to another memorable collapse in the Backyard Brawl. Trailing 31–9 in the 4th quarter, Pitt scored 22 unanswered points and kicked a game-tying field goal as time expired to force a 31–31 tie. The Mountaineers suffered another defeat the following week with a 12–10 home loss to Virginia Tech, followed by a 19–9 loss to No. 16 Penn State in State College. Despite those defeats, WVU finished the regular season at 8–2–1, a No. 17 ranking in the AP Poll, and a trip to the Gator Bowl to face No. 14 Clemson. The Mountaineers lost 27–7 and finished the season at 8–3–1 with a No. 21 ranking in the final AP Poll. The 1990 season, West Virginia's final as an NCAA Division I-A Independent, coincided with a 4–7 finish.

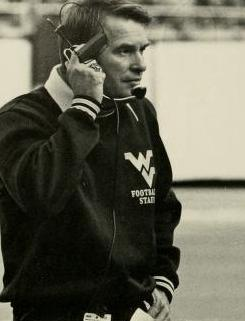
Don Nehlen, WVU's all-time leader in victories (149) and College Football Hall of Fame inductee.

West Virginia entered the 1991 season as new members of the Big East in what became a 20-year affiliation with the conference. After finishes of 6–5 in 1991 and 5–4–2 in 1992, the Mountaineers returned to ranks of the college football elite in the 1993 season. For the second time in six seasons, West Virginia produced an undefeated, 11-win regular season in 1993. The Mountaineers engineered several close victories, beginning with a 36–34 upset of No. 17 Louisville at home in Morgantown. In its final two regular season games, WVU twice erased 4th quarter deficits to defeat No. 4 Miami and No. 11 Boston College. Despite finishing the regular season undefeated and ranked No. 2 in the Coaches Poll and No. 3 in the AP Poll, West Virginia was not selected to play in the Orange Bowl for a possible national championship. The Bowl Coalition system, designed to place the top two ranked teams in a bowl to determine the National Champion, slotted the Mountaineers at No. 3 behind 11–1 Florida State. The Seminoles were selected to play No. 1 Nebraska in the Orange Bowl for the national championship, while West Virginia settled for a Sugar Bowl berth against SEC Champion Florida. The Gators routed the Mountaineers 41–7, denying West Virginia its perfect season. WVU finished the season at 11–1, ranked No. 6 in the Coaches Poll and No. 7 in the AP Poll. Robert Walker amassed a then-school record 1,250 rushing yards, along with 11 touchdowns on the season.

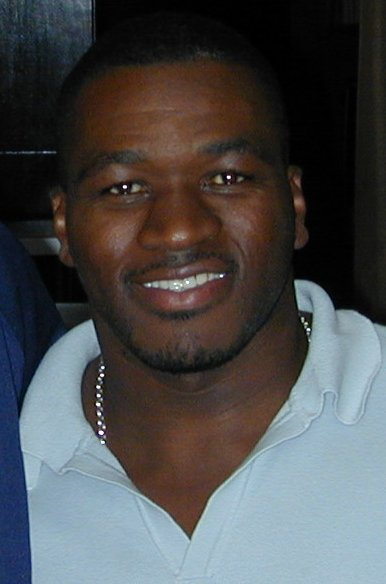
Amos Zereoué, WVU's fourth all-time leading rusher (4,086 yards).

The 1993 season was WVU's final season with double-digit victories during Nehlen's tenure as subsequent Mountaineer teams failed to recapture that level of success. After posting a 7–6 record in 1994 and a 5–6 mark in 1995, the 1996 Mountaineers showed promise of returning the program to national prominence. West Virginia began the 1996 season with a 7–0 record, only to lose three of its final four regular season games en route to an 8–3 record and a 20–13 defeat in the Gator Bowl at the hands of No. 12 North Carolina to finish 8–4. The Mountaineers put together another strong start in 1997, taking a 7–2 record into the final two weeks of the season. Once again, the Mountaineers faltered as they lost 21–14 at Notre Dame and 41–38 in triple overtime to a 5–5 Pitt team to finish the regular season at 7–4. The late season collapse culminated in another bowl game defeat, this time to Georgia Tech in the Carquest Bowl. Despite the disappointing conclusion to the season, quarterback Marc Bulger emerged as a capable leader throwing for 2,465 yards and 14 touchdowns. Running back Amos Zereoué shattered Robert Walker's rushing record with 1,589 yards, and his 18 rushing touchdowns are the second most in a single season at WVU.

The 1998 season brought high expectations for the Mountaineers, as WVU entered the season ranked No. 11 in the AP Poll. Despite dropping its opening game to No. 1 Ohio State, West Virginia rebounded to win its next four games and went on to finish the season with an 8–3 record and 5–2 mark in Big East conference play. The Mountaineers failed to attain nine wins, however, as they lost their 8th consecutive bowl game in the Insight.com Bowl to Missouri. Bulger set two WVU records with 3,607 yards passing and 31 touchdown passes, while Zereoué amassed 1,462 yards rushing and 13 touchdowns in his final season as a Mountaineer. Receivers Shawn Foreman and David Saunders finished with eight touchdown receptions each. After a 4–7 finish in 1999, Don Nehlen's final season with the Mountaineers in 2000 culminated in a 7–5 record with a victory in the Music City Bowl over Ole Miss, ending West Virginia's streak of futility in bowl games. Overall, Nehlen posted a 149–93–4 record during his tenure at West Virginia, making him both the longest-serving and most successful head coach in Mountaineer history. While his coaching tenure contained numerous successes, Nehlen's time at WVU also included its share of shortcomings as his Mountaineer teams often struggled against ranked opponents and in bowl games. (Note: From 1980 to 2000, WVU compiled a 14–41–1 record against ranked opponents and a 4–9 record in bowl games, including eight consecutive bowl game defeats between 1987 and 1998.) However, as the man responsible for shaping the Mountaineer football program and bringing it to national relevancy in his 21 seasons in Morgantown, Nehlen was inducted into the College Football Hall of Fame in 2005. Most importantly, his tenure laid the foundation for the program's most successful and prominent era.

=== Rich Rodriguez era (2001–2007) ===
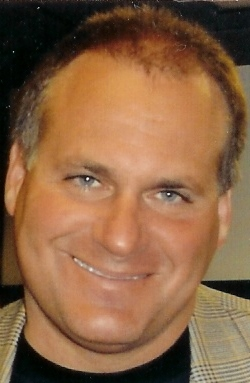
Rich Rodriguez, WVU head coach (2001–07) and the program's third all-time leader in wins (60).

After Nehlen's retirement, WVU named then-Clemson offensive coordinator and West Virginia native Rich Rodriguez as its first new head coach in 20 years. Rodriguez's tenure began ignominiously, as the 2001 edition of the Mountaineers finished 3–8, its worst record since 1978. The failures of 2001, however, set the stage for the emergence of the most successful era in Mountaineer football history. The 2002 season represented the biggest single-season turnaround in program history. Despite a 5–3 record through the season's first eight games, the Mountaineers reeled off four consecutive victories, including upset road wins over then-ranked rivals Virginia Tech (No. 13) and Pitt (No. 17). West Virginia finished the regular season at 9–3 overall, with a 6–1 conference record for second place in the Big East, and a berth in the Continental Tire Bowl with Virginia. Despite losing its bowl game, West Virginia finished with a 9–4 record and was ranked in both the final Coaches (No. 20) and AP (No. 25) polls for the first time since 1993. The momentum generated from the 2002 campaign was short-lived as the Mountaineers stumbled to a 1–4 record early in the 2003 season. In similar fashion to the previous season, West Virginia rebounded and recorded seven wins in a row, including upsets of No. 3 Virginia Tech and No. 16 Pitt. The Mountaineers ended the regular season at 8–4 with a 6–1 conference mark, earning them a share of their first Big East title since 1993. West Virginia earned a trip to the Gator Bowl for a rematch with rival Maryland. The result for the Mountaineers was a near duplicate of their 34–7 defeat to the Terrapins earlier in the season, as they fell 41–7 and finished the season 8–5. In contrast to 2002 and 2003, the 2004 season may best be remembered for what the Mountaineers failed to accomplish. West Virginia, ranked No. 10 in the AP Poll to begin the season, carried an 8–1 record through its first nine games. The Mountaineers collapsed in the final two games of the regular season, however, losing to No. 21 Boston College and to Pitt. West Virginia squandered its opportunity to win the Big East outright, leading to a four-way tie for first place and the BCS Fiesta Bowl nomination going to Pitt by tiebreaker. The disappointing season drew to a close with 30–18 loss to Florida State in the Gator Bowl, giving WVU an 8–4 record.

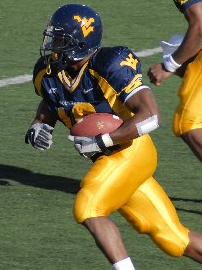
Steve Slaton, WVU's fifth all-time leading rusher and record holder for single-season rushing yards (1,744)

The 2005 season was a noteworthy one for the Mountaineers. After a 5–1 (albeit offensively sluggish) start to the season, the Mountaineers came alive in Week 7 against No. 19 Louisville. Quarterback Pat White and running back Steve Slaton helped to erase a 24–7 4th-quarter deficit en route to a thrilling 46–44 triple overtime victory. From that point forward, the Mountaineers outscored their opponents 156–39 en route to a 10–1 finish and a 7–0 record in conference play for their second outright Big East championship. The Mountaineers also earned their first ever BCS bowl game berth, facing No. 8 Georgia in the Sugar Bowl. West Virginia scored 21 points in the 1st quarter, holding on for a 38–35 upset victory. The Mountaineers finished the 2005 season with their third 11-win season and achieved rankings of No. 5 and No. 6 in the AP and Coaches Polls, respectively. The Mountaineers once again posted 11 wins in the 2006 season, narrowly missing out on another Big East championship after losses to Louisville and South Florida. West Virginia remained ranked in the top 15 in both polls throughout the season, earning another New Year's Day bowl game as they met Georgia Tech in the Gator Bowl. The Mountaineers came away with another 38–35 victory, winning consecutive bowl games for the first time since the 1983 and 1984 seasons. Additionally, center Dan Mozes and running back Steve Slaton earned Consensus All-American honors. Slaton's 1,744 yards rushing set the WVU single-season rushing record.

The 2007 season may well be regarded as the most infamous season in West Virginia football history. The Mountaineers attained a preseason ranking of No. 3 and had national championship aspirations. WVU raced to a 10–1 record, including a 66–21 victory over UConn to secure its fifth Big East title and its second BCS bowl appearance. The Mountaineers rose to as high as No. 2 in the AP Poll and No. 1 in the Coaches Poll, needing only a victory at home over a 4–7, 28-point underdog Pitt team in the 100th installment of the Backyard Brawl to secure its second ever National Championship Game appearance. That victory did not come, as the Mountaineers suffered a devastating 13–9 defeat. The fallout of the Pitt defeat reached beyond national championship implications for the program, as it culminated in the departure of Rich Rodriguez to Michigan. Rodriguez left prior to West Virginia's meeting with No. 3 Oklahoma in the Fiesta Bowl. The Mountaineers rebounded, posting a 48–28 victory over the heavily favored Sooners.

=== Bill Stewart era (2007–2010) ===
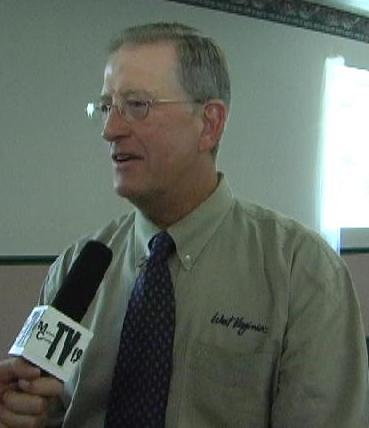
Bill Stewart

"Leave no doubt tonight. Leave no...doubt...tonight. No doubt they shouldn’t have played the 'Old Gold and Blue.' Not. This. Night."

— Bill Stewart's locker room speech prior to the 2008 Fiesta Bowl.

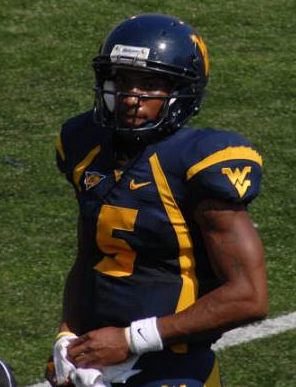
Pat White, the NCAA's second all-time rushing leader amongst Quarterbacks (4,480 yards).

Long-time assistant coach Bill Stewart, named as interim head coach for the game, received a five-year contract to become West Virginia's 32nd head coach. The Mountaineers concluded the 2007 season with an 11–2 record and were ranked at No. 6 in both of the final AP and Coaches Polls. The Mountaineers transitioned into the Bill Stewart era in the 2008 season. WVU amassed a 9–4 record and a second-place finish in the Big East, closing the season Meineke Car Care Bowl victory over North Carolina and a No. 23 ranking in the AP Poll. The bowl victory was West Virginia's fourth in a row, giving Pat White a postseason record of 4–0 as a starting quarterback. During Week 13 of the 2008 season, White set the NCAA rushing yardage record for quarterbacks with a 200-yard performance in a 35–21 win over Louisville.

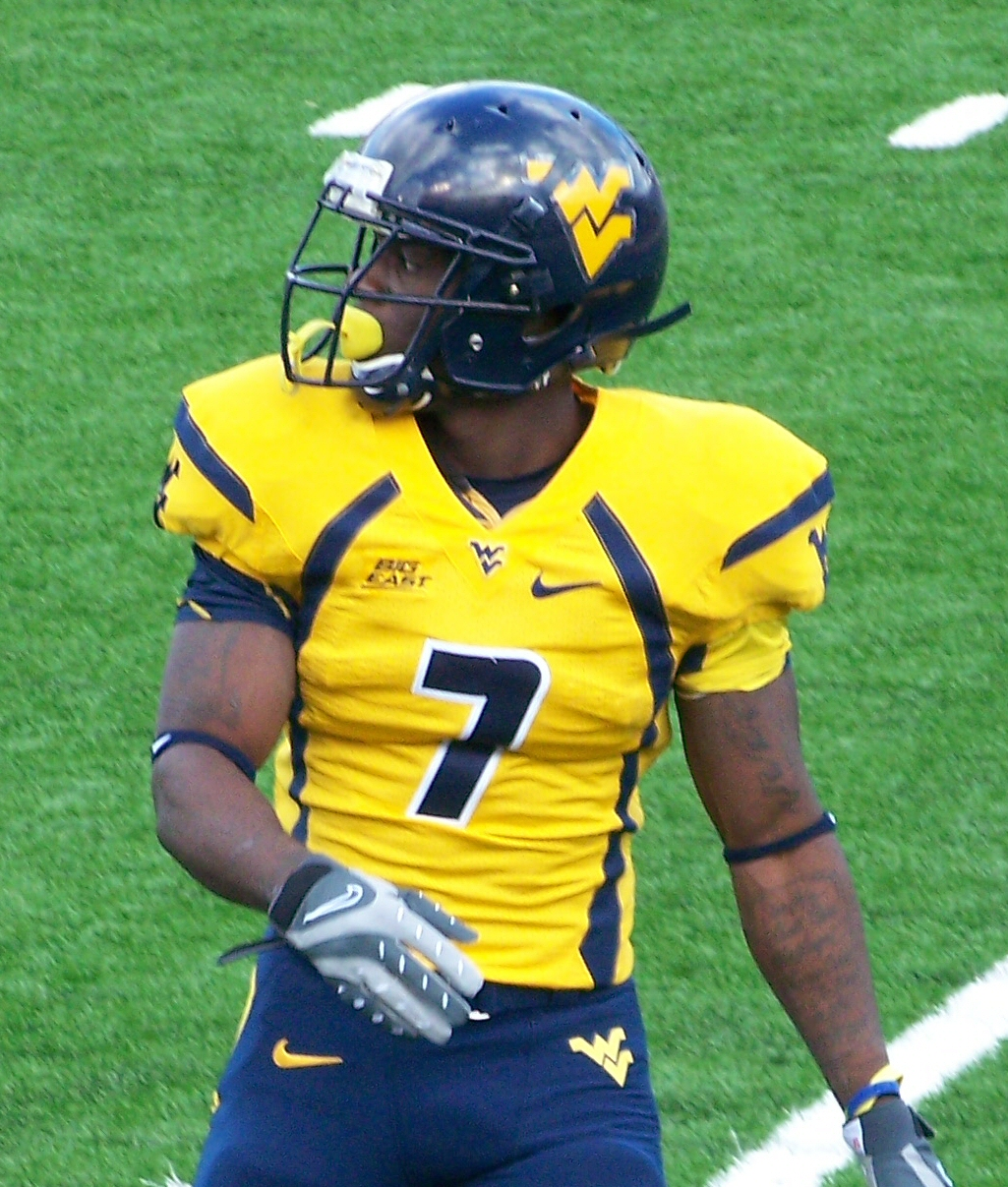
Noel Devine, WVU's third all-time leading rusher (4,315 yards).

The 2009 season culminated in another nine-win campaign and second-place finish in the Big East for the Mountaineers. WVU ended its two-year losing streak in the Backyard Brawl with an upset victory over No. 8 Pitt. West Virginia's season concluded with a loss in the Gator Bowl to Florida State in Bobby Bowden's final game as a head coach. The 2010 season brought the program its third consecutive nine-win season. Nonetheless, the season was ultimately a disappointment for the Mountaineers. Despite assembling arguably the strongest defense in program history (surrendering only 176 total points, an average of 13.5 per game) and having a talented offense, West Virginia struggled with consistency all season. The Mountaineers lost to No. 15 LSU, Syracuse and UConn by a combined 14 points, while the Mountaineer defense did not surrender more than 23 points scored against in a single game throughout the season. WVU's loss to Connecticut in Week 9 came back to haunt the Mountaineers as they lost out on a BCS Bowl bid by virtue of a tiebreaker to the Huskies.

=== Dana Holgorsen era (2011–2018) ===
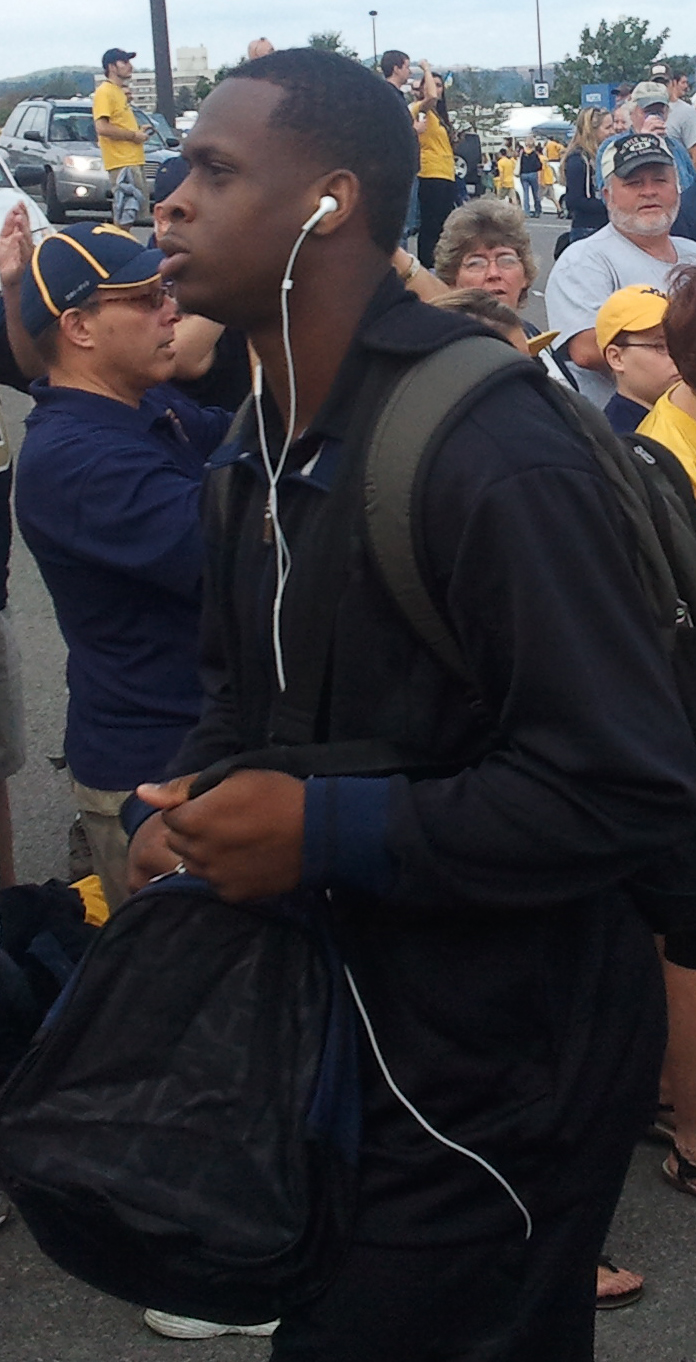
Geno Smith, WVU Quarterback (2009–2012) and the program's all-time leading passer.

Prior to West Virginia's Champs Sports Bowl match up with North Carolina State, Dana Holgorsen was hired as the "coach-in-waiting," serving as offensive coordinator during the 2011 season and replacing Stewart as head coach in 2012. Luck didn't believe Stewart was capable of leading the Mountaineers to a national championship, and was also concerned about declining season ticket sales. The relationship between Stewart and Holgorsen imploded just months later. Colin Dunlap of KDKA-FM in Pittsburgh claimed that Stewart had asked him to dig up dirt on Holgorsen while Dunlap was a reporter at the Pittsburgh Post-Gazette. While athletic director Luck was unable to substantiate the claims, he decided that the coach-in-waiting arrangement was untenable, leading to Stewart's resignation and Holgorsen becoming head coach.

The Mountaineers finished the 2011 regular season with a 9–3 record (5–2 in Big East play) and a share of its 7th Big East title. The Mountaineers were the only Big East team ranked in the final BCS standings (No. 23), earning the BCS bid by tiebreaker and an Orange Bowl berth against ACC champion No. 14 Clemson. In its first Orange Bowl appearance, the Mountaineers soundly defeated Clemson 70–33 and set an NCAA record for points scored in a bowl game. The Mountaineers finished the season at 10–3 and ranked No. 17 in the AP Poll and No. 18 in the Coaches Poll. From 2002 to 2011, the Mountaineer football program yielded its most prolific era to date, producing a 95–33 record. During that span WVU participated in ten bowl games, finished ranked in at least one of the AP or Coaches Polls on seven occasions, won six Big East Conference titles, and produced three BCS bowl game victories.

In the midst of continued college football conference realignment, WVU joined the Big 12 Conference as of July 1, 2012. Despite starting the 2012 season at 5–0 and climbing into the top 5 in the AP and Coaches Polls, WVU lost six of its final eight games en route to a 7–6 finish. The season culminated in a loss to rival Syracuse in the Pinstripe Bowl. The 2013 season brought WVU's first losing campaign since 2001. After a 4–5 start and an opportunity to secure bowl eligibility with two victories, WVU faltered in its final three games to finish 4–8. The Mountaineers rebounded in the 2014 season, posting a 7–6 record against a schedule featuring five opponents ranked in the top 15. WVU raced to a 6–2 start, only to lose four of its final five games. The Mountaineers returned to a bowl game in 2014, losing in the Liberty Bowl. WVU returned to the eight-win plateau in 2015 season, posting a 7–5 record during the regular season and winning the Cactus Bowl. In the 2016 season, the Mountaineers finished in second place in the Big 12 and finished the season with a 10–3 record, the ninth season in the program's history with at least ten victories. The season culminated in a loss to Miami in the Russell Athletic Bowl. Prior to the conclusion of the regular season, Holgorsen and WVU agreed to a five-year contract extension. In 2017, WVU finished 7–6. The season concluded with a loss in the Heart of Dallas Bowl. The Mountaineers started the season 7–3, only to lose their final three games after a season-ending hand injury to quarterback Will Grier. The 2018 season saw the Mountaineers start with an 8–1 record, earning top 10 rankings in the polls and in the College Football Playoff. WVU faltered in its final two regular season games, however, and failed to earn a berth in the Big 12 Championship Game. WVU finished 8–4 with a loss in the Camping World Bowl. Soon thereafter, Dana Holgorsen left the program to take the head coaching position at Houston.

=== Neal Brown era (2019–2024) ===
On January 5, 2019, Troy head coach Neal Brown was named the 34th head coach of the program. Brown brought with him an exciting, up-tempo- pass-oriented offense known as the Air raid. WVU finished the 2019 season with a 5–7 record, failing to qualify for a bowl game for the first time since 2013. The Mountaineers rebounded in 2020, posting 6–4 record culminating in a Liberty Bowl victory against Army in their first meeting since the 1961 season.

In 2021, the Mountaineers were looking for improvement, but were met with more of the same, finishing with a 6–6 record through the regular season. They began the season with a rivalry loss to Maryland, and then defeated LIU and won back the Black Diamond Trophy from Virginia Tech. The team finished the season in the Guaranteed Rate Bowl at Chase Field in Phoenix, resulting in an 18–6 loss to the Minnesota Golden Gophers. The Mountaineer's 2022 season was looked at with much excitement after the team was able to successfully sign former five-star quarterback JT Daniels in the offseason, and the anticipation of the renewal of the Backyard Brawl for the first time since 2011. The season kicked off with the Mountaineers traveling to Pittsburgh to play the Panthers at Acrisure Stadium. However, the Mountaineers failed to start the season with a win, losing the game 38–31. A few weeks later, after losing to Kansas at home in overtime and defeating Towson, the team successfully defended the Black Diamond Trophy at Virginia Tech, winning 33–10. The Mountaineers went on to lose four out of the five conference games. The season ended with optimism after Sophomore Backup-QB Garrett Greene defeated the Oklahoma Sooners 23–20 for the first time since entering the Big 12 Conference. After this game, Greene was named the Mountaineer's starter. The Mountaineers finished the season 5–7 (3–6 conference), failing to qualify for a bowl game for the 2nd time in the Neal Brown Era.

The 2023 season started with the renewal of another West Virginia rival. The team was set to play the Penn State Nittany Lions for the first time since 1992. After the Mountaineers lost the season opener 38–15, the team rallied to win four games in a row, including a 17–6 win against Pitt at home. After dropping the next two games to Houston and Oklahoma State, they were able to string together four wins in the last five games to give them a regular season record of 8–4, the best of Neal Brown's WVU tenure. They went on to defeat the North Carolina Tar Heels in the 2023 Duke's Mayo Bowl by a score of 30–10. However, the success of the 2023 season was unable to continue through the 2024 season. The Mountaineers dropped to a 1–2 record in non-conference play with losses to rivals Penn State and Pitt. Conference play wasn't a success either, and the team finished the season with a 6–6 record. On December 1, 2024, the day after losing to Texas Tech in the regular season finale 52–15, West Virginia University fired Neal Brown. He went 37–35 during his tenure in Morgantown. Offensive coordinator Chad Scott took over as interim head coach until the conclusion of the Frisco Bowl against the Memphis Tigers, which the Mountaineers would go on to lose by a score of 37–42.

=== Return of Rich Rodriguez (2025–present) ===
On December 11, 2024, it was reported that Rodriguez and West Virginia University had agreed in principle that he would become the next head football coach of the West Virginia Mountaineers with contract terms and language yet to be finalized. On December 12, 2024, he was officially named the 36th head football coach in the history of the West Virginia Mountaineers.

== Conference affiliations ==
- Independent (1891–1924, 1928–1949, 1968–1990)
- West Virginia Athletic Conference (1925–1927)
- Southern Conference (1950–1967)
- Big East Conference (1991–2011)
- Big 12 Conference (2012–present)

== Championships ==
=== Conference championships ===
West Virginia has won or shared a conference championship on 15 occasions, ten outright and five shared, including eight Southern Conference (SoCon) titles and seven Big East Conference titles.

Year	Coach	Conference	Overall record	Conference record
1953	Art Lewis	Southern Conference	8–2	4–0
1954	Art Lewis	Southern Conference	8–1	3–0
1955	Art Lewis	Southern Conference	8–2	4–0
1956	Art Lewis	Southern Conference	6–4	5–0
1958	Art Lewis	Southern Conference	4–5–1	4–0
1964	Gene Corum	Southern Conference	7–4	5–0
1965	Gene Corum	Southern Conference	6–4	4–0
1967	Jim Carlen	Southern Conference	5–4–1	4–0–1
1993	Don Nehlen	Big East Conference	11–1	7–0
2003†	Rich Rodriguez	Big East Conference	8–5	6–1
2004†	Rich Rodriguez	Big East Conference	8–4	4–2
2005	Rich Rodriguez	Big East Conference	11–1	7–0
2007†	Rich Rodriguez	Big East Conference	11–2	5–2
2010†	Bill Stewart	Big East Conference	9–4	5–2
2011†	Dana Holgorsen	Big East Conference	10–3	5–2

† Co-champion

=== Regional championships ===
The ECAC Lambert-Meadowlands Trophy is an annual award given to the best team in the Eastern Region of FBS-level college football. West Virginia has received the award as Eastern Champion on four occasions.

Season	Coach	Region	Record
1988	Don Nehlen	Eastern	11–1
1993	Don Nehlen	Eastern	11–1
2007	Rich Rodriguez	Eastern	11–2
2011	Dana Holgorsen	Eastern	10–3

== Bowl games ==
West Virginia has participated in 41 bowl games throughout its history, compiling a 17–24 record through the 2024 season. The Mountaineers endured a dubious string of post-season futility from 1987 to 2004, losing 11 of 12 bowl games including eight consecutive losses between 1987 and 1998. However, West Virginia won four straight bowl games from 2005 to 2008 with Pat White, who became the first ever quarterback to win all four bowl games as a starter in Division I college football. These are West Virginia's last ten bowl games.

Season	Bowl	Opponent	Result
2012	Pinstripe Bowl	Syracuse	L 14–38
2014	Liberty Bowl	Texas A&M	L 37–45
2015	Cactus Bowl	Arizona State	W 43–42
2016	Russell Athletic Bowl	Miami	L 14–31
2017	Heart of Dallas Bowl	Utah	L 14–30
2018	Camping World Bowl	Syracuse	L 18–34
2020	Liberty Bowl	Army	W 24–21
2021	Guaranteed Rate Bowl	Minnesota	L 6–18
2023	Duke's Mayo Bowl	North Carolina	W 30–10
2024	Frisco Bowl	Memphis	L 37–42

== Head coaches ==
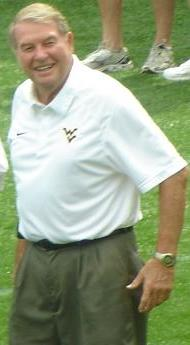
Don Nehlen, winner of four Coach of the Year awards at WVU.

The West Virginia Mountaineers have had 34 head coaches throughout the program's history. With 149 victories, Don Nehlen is first overall in the program's history, followed by Dana Holgorsen and Rich Rodriguez tied with 61 each.

Name	Seasons	Record	Pct.
Frederick Lincoln Emory	1891	0–1	.000
F. William Rane	1893–94	4–3	.571
Harry McCrory	1895	5–1	.833
Thomas Trenchard	1896	3–7–2	.333
George Krebs	1897	5–4–1	.550
Harry Anderson	1898	6–1	.857
Lewis Yeager	1899, 1901	5–5	.500
John E. Hill	1900	4–3	.571
Harold J. Davall	1902	7–4	.636
Harry E. Trout	1903	7–1	.875
Anthony Chez	1904	6–3	.667
Carl Forkum	1905–1906	13–6	.684
Clarence W. Russell	1907	6–4	.600
Charles A. Lueder	1908–1911	17–13–3	.561
William P. Edmunds	1912	6–3	.667
Edwin Sweetland	1913	3–4–2	.444
Sol Metzger	1914–1915	10–6–1	.618
Mont McIntire	1916–1920	24–11–4	.667
Clarence Spears	1921–1924	30–6–3	.808
Ira Errett Rodgers	1925–1930, 1943–1945	41–31–8	.563
Greasy Neale	1931–1933	12–16–3	.435
Charles Tallman	1934–1936	15–12–2	.552
Marshall Glenn	1937–1939	14–12–3	.534
Bill Kern	1940–1942, 1946–1947	24–23–1	.510
Dudley DeGroot	1948–1949	13–9–1	.587
Art Lewis	1950–1959	58–38–2	.602
Gene Corum	1960–1965	29–30–2	.492
Jim Carlen	1966–1969	25–13–3	.616
Bobby Bowden	1970–1975	42–26	.618
Frank Cignetti, Sr.	1976–1979	17–27	.386
Don Nehlen	1980–2000	149–93–4	.614
Rich Rodriguez	2001–2007, 2025–present	62–27	.697
Bill Stewart	2007–2010	28–12	.700
Dana Holgorsen	2011–2018	61–41	.598
Neal Brown	2019–2024	37–35	.514

== Rankings ==
West Virginia has finished a season ranked in at least one of the Associated Press (AP) or Coaches polls on 22 occasions. The Mountaineers have finished ranked amongst the top 10 in college football on five occasions. West Virginia attained its highest-ever ranking in the polls during week 14 of the 2007 season, when they were ranked No. 1 in the Coaches Poll and No. 2 in the AP Poll.

The Mountaineers have concluded the regular season ranked in the final rankings of the College Football Playoff (CFP) on two occasions. West Virginia finished the regular season ranked seven times in the final rankings of the Bowl Championship Series (BCS), a predecessor to the CFP. The Bowl Coalition, a predecessor to the CFP and BCS systems, ranked WVU 3rd in its final standings at the conclusion of the 1993 regular season. As of the end of the 2020 season, the Mountaineers were 49–122–2 against opponents ranked in the AP Poll.

WVU Final Rankings

Season	AP	Coaches	BCS/CFP	Record	Final NCAA Rankings
1953	10	13	-	8–2	1953 Final Rankings
1954	12	-	-	8–1	1954 Final Rankings
1955	19	17	-	8–2	1955 Final Rankings
1969	17	18	-	10–1	1969 Final Rankings
1975	20	17	-	9–3	1975 Final Rankings
1981	17	18	-	9–3	1981 Final Rankings
1982	19	19	-	9–3	1982 Final Rankings
1983	16	16	-	9–3	1983 Final Rankings
1984	-	18	-	8–4	1984 Final Rankings
1988	5	5	-	11–1	1988 Final Rankings
1989	21	-	-	8–3–1	1989 Final Rankings

Season	AP	Coaches	BCS/CFP	Record	Final NCAA Rankings
1993	7	6	-	11–1	1993 Final Rankings
2002	25	20	15	9–4	2002 Final Rankings
2005	5	6	11	11–1	2005 Final Rankings
2006	10	10	13	11–2	2006 Final Rankings
2007	6	6	9	11–2	2007 Final Rankings
2008	23	-	-	9–4	2008 Final Rankings
2009	25	22	16	9–4	2009 Final Rankings
2010	-	-	22	9–4	2010 Final Rankings
2011	17	18	23	10–3	2011 Final Rankings
2016	18	17	16	10–3	2016 Final Rankings
2018	20	22	16	8–4	2018 Final Rankings
2023	-	25	-	9-4	2023 Final Rankings

== Facilities ==
=== Mountaineer Field ===
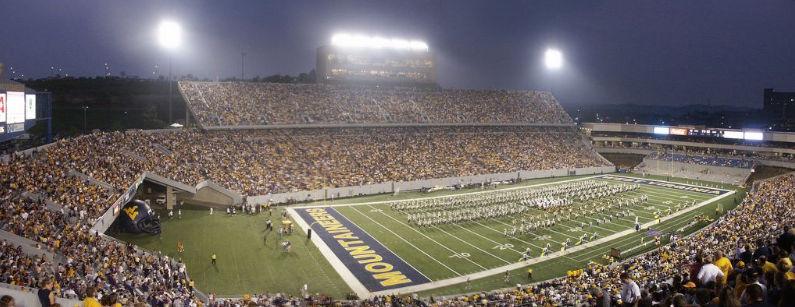
Panoramic view inside of Mountaineer Field in 2004.

Since 1891, the Mountaineers have played their home games in Morgantown, West Virginia along with neutral-site games at numerous locations throughout West Virginia, most notably in Charleston, Clarksburg, Fairmont, Parkersburg and Wheeling. The construction of Old Mountaineer Field in 1924 gave WVU its first permanent home facility. Located next to Woodburn Hall in what is now considered the Downtown portion of the WVU campus, the first incarnation of Mountaineer Field consisted of a horseshoe-type seating arrangement. The stadium eventually grew in capacity to its peak of 38,000 by 1979. The physical location of the stadium made it impossible for further expansion to take place, however, and led to the relocation of the football program to the new Mountaineer Field in 1980. The old stadium was razed in 1987. At the southwest corner where the stadium once stood, there is a horseshoe-shaped monument commemorating the stadium. From 1924 to 1979 the Mountaineers played 267 games at Old Mountaineer Field, compiling a 171–82–14 record.

The Mountaineers have played their home games at the second incarnation of Mountaineer Field since 1980. The bowl-shaped stadium is located on the Evansdale section of the WVU campus. Originally constructed with an east–west configuration of the seating areas and a capacity of 50,000, subsequent seating additions at the north and south ends of the facility increased the capacity to over 63,000 by 1986 through the 2003 season. Suites were first introduced to Mountaineer Field in 1994, with 12 suites being constructed in the first row of the press box on the stadium's west end. General admission seating in the north end zone was replaced with 18 suites in 2004 to create the "Touchdown Terrace" section, while four additional suites were added in the south end zone in 2007. The construction of Touchdown Terrace in 2004 brought the stadium's capacity to 60,000.

As of November 29, 2003, the stadium has been named "Milan Puskar Stadium" in honor of Milan Puskar, the founder of Morgantown-based Mylan Pharmaceuticals, in recognition of his $20 million donation to the university.

Due to Mountaineer Field's capacity and the relatively smaller populations of West Virginia's largest cities, it has been suggested that Morgantown becomes the largest "city" in the state on game days due to the influx of spectators at the stadium. Crowds at Mountaineer Field have earned the reputation of being loud and boisterous, creating a hostile atmosphere for opposing teams.

The largest crowd to ever attend a game at the stadium was 70,222, set on November 20, 1993, when West Virginia defeated #4 Miami 17–14.

=== Milan Puskar Center ===
Also constructed in 1980 was the "Facilities Building" (now the Milan Puskar Center) to house the program's football offices. Originally located south of Mountaineer Field, in 1985 the facility was connected to the stadium when an 11,000-seat expansion enclosed the South end zone bowl. The 39,000-square-foot facility houses the team's locker room and training facilities, including a 23,000-square-foot weight training facility on the first floor of the complex. The second floor of the Puskar Center houses the offensive and defensive wings for the coaching staffs, the team meeting room, player position rooms, the football staff conference room, and the Reynolds Family Academic Performance Center. Also located on the second floor of the Puskar Center is the Donald J. Brohard Hall of Traditions. Made possible through a gift by WVU alumnus and Datatel, Inc. founder Ken Kendrick, the Hall of Traditions opened in 2006 to honor the history of the WVU football program. The Hall of Traditions houses interactive displays, videos, photos, records and information on the program. The Hall is open to the public on weekdays throughout the year.

The Puskar Center underwent significant renovations in 2012 and 2013, aimed specifically at improving the weight room, the aesthetics of the facility's interior, lounge space for the football players and upgrading the coaches' meeting areas. Further renovation of the Puskar Center in 2015 culminated with the construction of a new team meeting room for the players and coaches. The structure has 162 theater-style chairs to seat an entire football team, as well as support staff and personnel. The room is also utilized for the head coach's weekly news conferences during the season, as well as media interviews with players and other coaches.

Further renovations to the Puskar Center are planned for the future as part of WVU's master plan for athletic facilities.

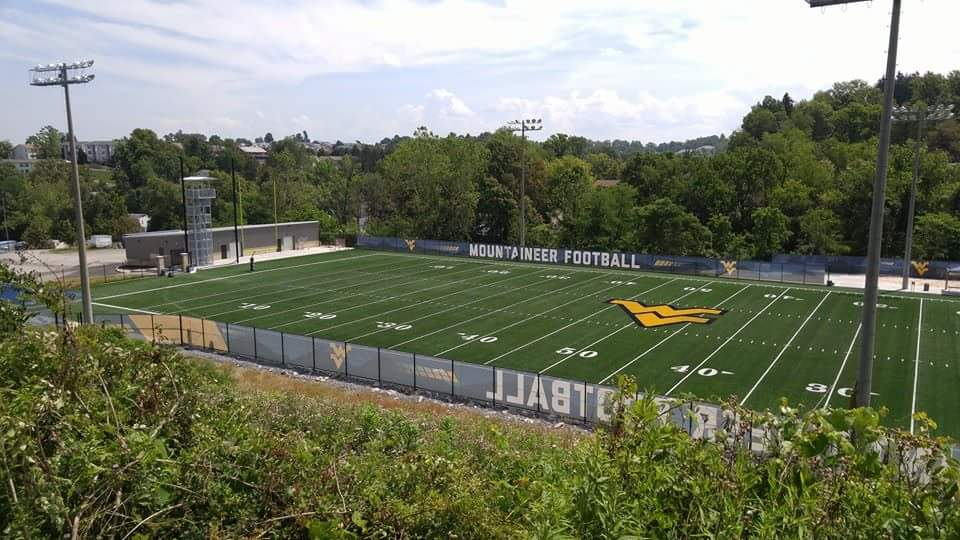
The Steve Antoline Family football practice field at West Virginia University.

=== Practice fields ===
The Mountaineers utilize two facilities for indoor and outdoor football practices, the Caperton Indoor Practice Facility and the Steve Antoline Family Football Practice Field.

The Caperton facility opened in August 1998. The indoor space is equipped with a 90-yard FieldTurf playing surface with seven yards of safety zone surrounding the entire field. Total length from wall to wall is 105 yards, with more than 75,000 square feet of practice room. Located behind the Caperton facility is the Steve Antoline Family Practice Field, a FieldTurf facility previously consisting of two grass fields. The Antoline facility consists of a full-length 120-yard field along with an adjacent 60-yard field.

== Traditions ==
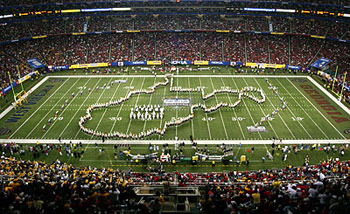
Formation of the state by the Pride of West Virginia marching band during the 2006 Sugar Bowl.

=== "Take Me Home, Country Roads" ===
The theme song of West Virginia University, John Denver's "Take Me Home, Country Roads" has been performed at every home football game pregame show since 1972. In 1980, John Denver performed his hit song during pregame festivities to a sold-out crowd at Mountaineer Field. His performance marked the dedication of the second incarnation of Mountaineer Field and the first game for head coach Don Nehlen. After every home win, WVU players and fans link arm-in-arm and sing along to a recording of the song.

=== Pregame show ===
Performed by the Pride of West Virginia marching band, the pregame show includes such traditions as the 220-beat per minute run-on introductory drum cadence, the formation of the "Flying WV" logo to the tune of "Fight Mountaineers," and the forming of the state of West Virginia while playing the university fight song "Hail, West Virginia." The band also performs "Take Me Home, Country Roads" as well as Aaron Copland's "Simple Gifts." The fans participate in several cheers during the pregame show, notably chanting "W-V-U" to the roll of the band's drum line prior to the playing of "Fight Mountaineers," as well as chanting "Let's Go Mountaineers" in between playings of "Hail, West Virginia."

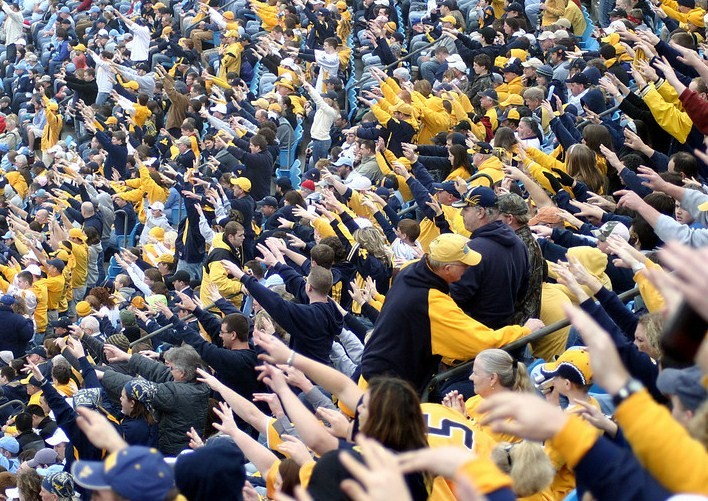
Mountaineer fans perform the "1st Down" cheer

=== Stadium chants ===
WVU students encompassing the "Mountaineer Maniacs" section and fans alike participate in several chants during WVU home games. The "Let's Go...Mountaineers" chant, with the east end of the stadium shouting "Let's Go..." and the west end responding with "Mountaineers," is the most popular amongst those in attendance. Since the mid-2000s, West Virginia fans also participate in the "1st Down" and "3rd Down" cheers. The "1st Down" cheer was originated by multi-year season ticket holders Harold Tate and family in section 105 around the 1985 to 1988 seasons. The "1st Down" cheer can be heard at both home and away games prior to the announcement of a Mountaineer first down. Mountaineer fans raise their hands and hold a cheer of "OH!" in unison until the first down call is made by the public address announcer. Following the call, the fans pump their arms up and down three times to a chant of "W-V-U," clap and then signal to the end zone chanting "first down!" The "3rd Down" cheer is similar, with Mountaineer fans raising their arms and waving three fingers upon the announcement of "third down" by the public address.

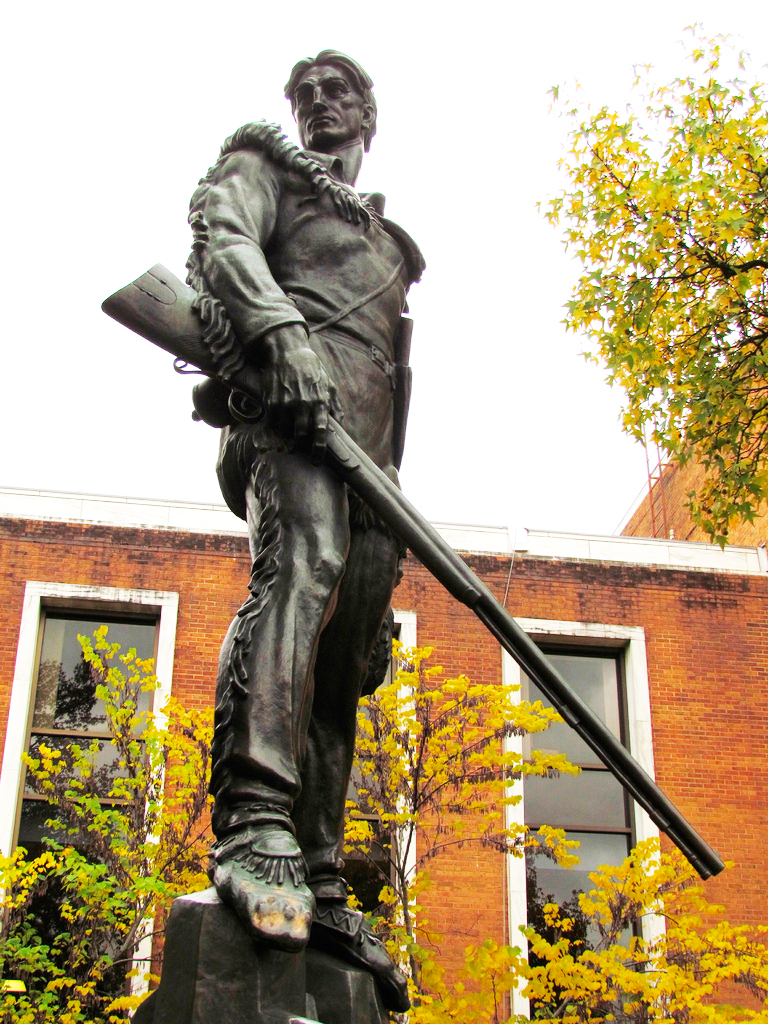
The Mountaineer statue located on the West Virginia University campus.

=== The Mountaineer ===
WVU incorporated the Mountaineers nickname in 1905 after the coining of West Virginia's state motto, "Mountaineers are Always Free." Prior to 1905, the team was referred to as the "Snakes." The Mountaineer mascot first appeared at WVU sporting events during the 1934–35 school year and has been a fixture ever since. The Mountaineer is selected each year by the Mountain Honorary, composed of members of West Virginia University's senior class. The Mountaineer's costume is tailored to fit each winner, and male Mountaineers customarily grow beards during their tenure to go along with the coonskin cap and rifle, although the beard is not a requirement for the mascot position. The mascot is modeled after the Mountaineer bronze statue located in front of the Mountainlair student union building on the WVU campus. During football games, the Mountaineer mascot will fire his musket upon the team's entrance prior to kickoff, at the conclusion of each quarter and following every score.

=== Gold Rush, True Blue and Stripe the Stadium ===
Introduced by head coach Rich Rodriguez during the 2007 season, the "Gold Rush" is an ongoing tradition with WVU fans at Mountaineer Field. Partially inspired by the Penn State "White Out" tradition, as well as the "black-out" effect created by Louisville Cardinals fans dressed in black during their game against WVU in 2006, Rodriguez encouraged Mountaineer fans to dress entirely in gold for the rematch between WVU and Louisville in 2007. WVU's home schedule has featured a Gold Rush home game in each of its subsequent seasons. Since 2008, West Virginia University has worked in conjunction with the United Way to promote the event, selling gold T-shirts to fans with the proceeds benefiting the WVU United Way Campaign.

In contrast, WVU designates one home game per season as a "True Blue" game where the fans in attendance are encouraged to wear blue throughout the stadium. The Mountaineer players wear their all-blue uniform sets for these particular games.

The fan tradition of "Stripe the Stadium" has been in place since the Mountaineers joined the Big 12 Conference in 2012. Fans are encouraged to wear a designated color for their respective seating section. Fans in even sections of the stadium and students in the lower section of the student section are asked to wear blue. Fans in odd sections and students in the upper section of the student section are asked to wear gold. The result is the stadium appearing to be "striped" in blue and gold".

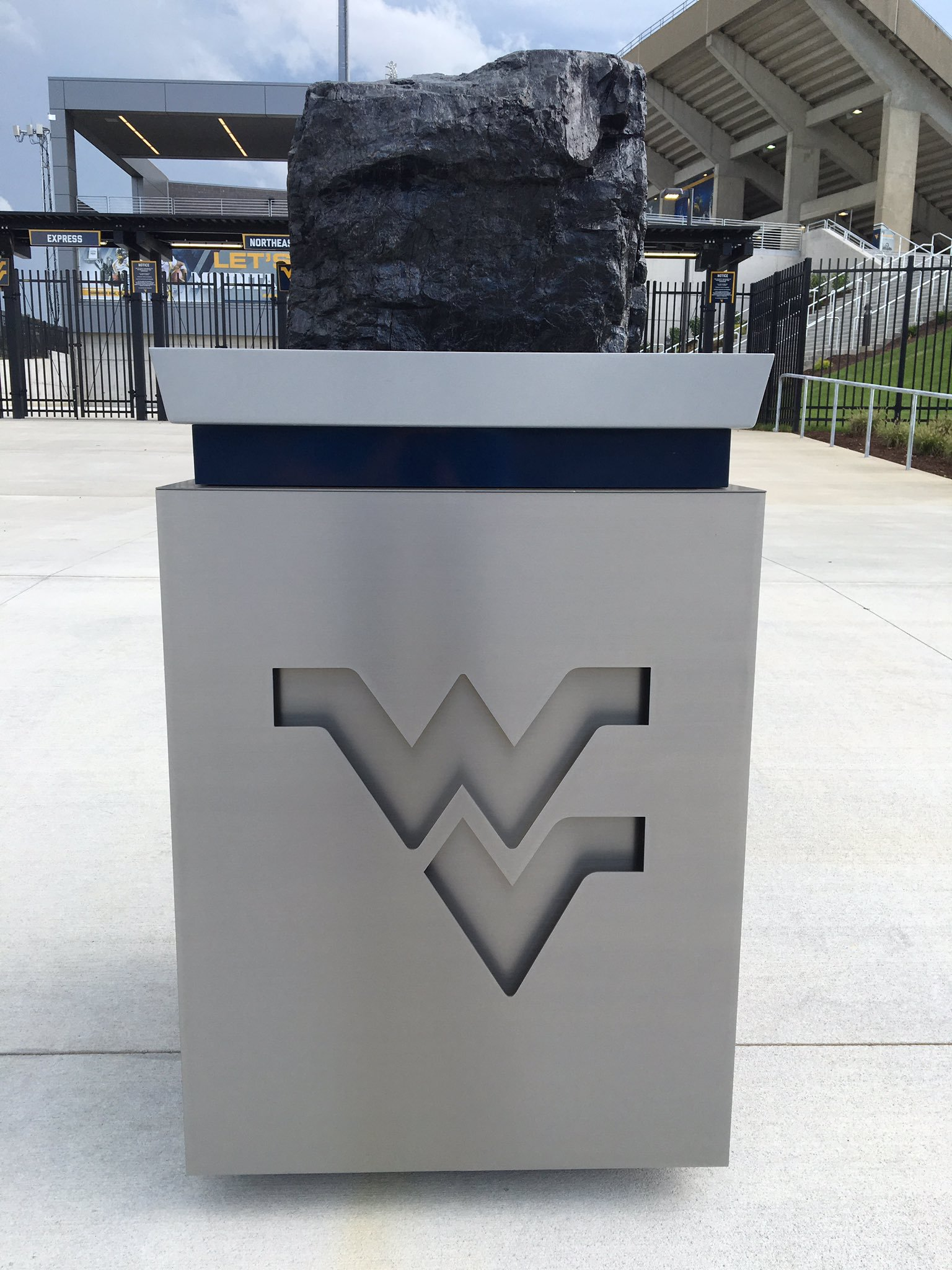
The piece of coal at the completion of the "Mountaineer Mantrip" route.

=== Mountaineer Mantrip ===
Instituted during the 2011 season by head coach Dana Holgorsen, the Mountaineer Mantrip is a part of West Virginia's gameday traditions and a recognition of the significance of West Virginia's coal industry. The event is named for the shuttle that transports coalminers into and out of an underground mine at the start and end of their shift and takes place at every home game.

The walk begins when the team is dropped off at the corner of the WVU Medical Center and Don Nehlen Drive prior to game time. They are accompanied by the Mountaineer mascot, the Pride of West Virginia Marching Band, and the Mountaineer cheerleaders. WVU students and fans line the path to create a tunnel-like effect for the passing team members. When the team reaches the east end of Mountaineer Field, they stop to rub a 350-pound mounted chunk of coal donated by Alpha Natural Resources from the Upper Big Branch coal mine.

A new feature at the completion of the Mantrip was introduced during the 2018 season. After players and coaches have reached Mountaineer Field and touched the mounted piece of coal, they turn and wave toward the parents and patients inside WVU Medicine Children's Hospital adjacent to Mountaineer Field. Dana Holgorsen added this portion of the festivity having drawn inspiration from the Kinnick Stadium "Wave".

== Logos and uniforms ==
The "Flying WV" logo.

Beginning in 1970, the Mountaineers donned the program's first official logo—the WVU "state outline"—on their helmets through the 1979 season and have reintroduced the logo as part of a "throwback" helmet since 2013. West Virginia used a white helmet with the state outline logo from 1970 to 1972, a gold helmet with the same logo from 1973 to 1978, and reverted to the white helmet and state outline logo in 1979 and again in 2013.

The "Flying WV" is the trademark logo for West Virginia Mountaineer football, adorning the team's helmet and uniform. It debuted in 1980 along with the current gold and blue color scheme as a part of a football uniform redesign by head coach Don Nehlen, and has since become one of the most widely recognized logos in collegiate athletics. In adopting the Flying WV logo on the team's helmets, Nehlen wanted to create a distinct image for the football program that could be easily identified. When Nehlen began his tenure as head coach in 1980, he initially had difficulty in distinguishing between WVU and its opponents while watching game film. The logo itself was created by sports artist John Martin, brother of then-Athletic Director Dick Martin. John Martin's primary inspiration for the logo was the depiction of mountains created with the combination of the state initials 'W' and 'V'. The surge in the logo's popularity led to its adoption as the official logo of West Virginia University in 1985.

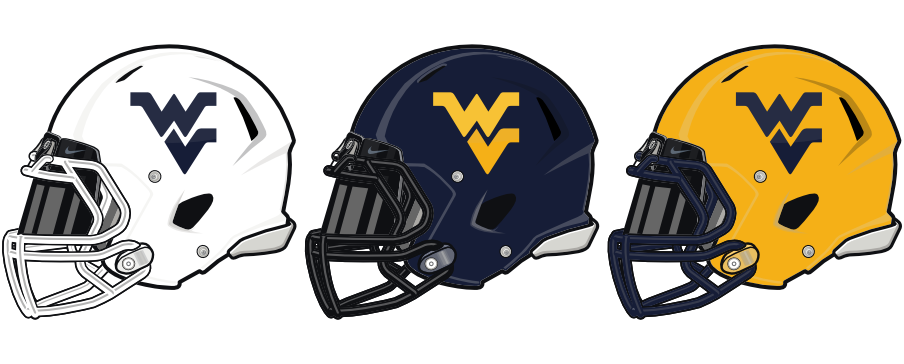
WVU's football helmets.

Since 1980, West Virginia's standard uniform has consisted of a dark blue jersey (home) or a white jersey (away) with gold pants and a dark blue helmet adorned by the gold "Flying WV" logo on both sides. West Virginia's uniform scheme has also included a gold helmet, white helmet, gold jersey, dark blue pants, and white pants at various stages throughout its history. WVU also added a gray uniform and helmet combination to its rotation for the 2012 season.

"State outline" logo, used from 1970 to 1979.

The Mountaineers wore a Nike Pro Combat uniform or the 2010 season edition of the Backyard Brawl. The uniform was specifically designed to pay tribute to West Virginia's coal mining industry. The jersey and pants consisted of a shade of white accented by a layer of coal dust, along with accents of university gold that referenced canaries utilized in coal mining. The helmet also implemented the coal dust accent, along with a yellow line down the center designed to embody the beam of light emitted by a miner's headlamp. West Virginia also donned the Pro Combat uniforms later that season for the Champs Sports Bowl.

WVU introduced new uniforms for the 2013 season. The helmets, jerseys, and pants featured blue, gold, and white primary color sets, creating 27 different possible uniform combinations. The reintroduction of the gold and white helmets to the uniform scheme marked the first time each have been used since the late 1970s. All of the helmets featured a matte, non-glossy paint finish and the "Flying WV" logo adorned on each side. WVU introduced a white "throwback" helmet during the 2013 season, utilizing the 1970s "state outline" logo. The West Virginia state motto, Montani Semper Liberi, (“Mountaineers are Always Free”), was stitched inside the back collar of all three jerseys. A canary image was stitched inside the front collar, representative of West Virginia's coal mining heritage for their use in testing toxicity levels in the mines. The jerseys had a unique number style exclusive to WVU, featuring sharp points and edges inspired by a miner's pickaxe.

As of the 2019 season and as part of a larger re-branding of all WVU sports teams, the Mountaineers incorporated new Nike Vapor Untouchable football uniforms. The all-gray alternate uniform also returned to the rotation. West Virginia debuted "Country Roads" uniforms on September 1, 2022, against longtime rival Pitt. The uniforms are inspired by West Virginia's roadways, with interstate maps on the shoulders and yellow striping that resembles center line markings on the helmet.

== Rivalries ==
=== Cincinnati ===
The football rivalry between West Virginia University and the Cincinnati Bearcats is a regional and conference-driven series that has seen several memorable moments over the decades. The two programs first met in 1921 and played occasionally throughout much of the 20th century, but the rivalry truly gained significance when Cincinnati joined the Big East Conference in 2005. From 2005 to 2011, they faced each other annually, often with conference title implications. WVU dominated the early Big East-era meetings, including a 38–0 shutout in 2005, but Cincinnati turned the tide in 2008 with a 26–23 overtime win. The most notable game came in 2009 when undefeated, fifth-ranked Cincinnati edged WVU 24–21 on their way to a Big East championship and BCS berth. The annual series paused after WVU left for the Big 12 Conference in 2012, while Cincinnati joined the American Athletic Conference. The rivalry was renewed in 2023 when Cincinnati joined the Big 12. Since its renewal, WVU has won both the 2023 and 2024 matchups. The Mountaineers currently lead the series all-time with a 18–3–1 record.

=== Marshall ===
West Virginia played in-state opponent Marshall in the annual Friends of Coal Bowl until 2012. Marshall and WVU first played in 1911, but it wasn't until 2006 before the two schools from the "Mountain State" faced off annually for the Governor's Cup. Some believe the rivalry began due to political pressure from the state government. The two last played in 2012, and there are no immediate plans to renew the rivalry. West Virginia holds a 12–0 lead in the series as of 2012. West Virginia has won all 12 meetings against Marshall.

=== Maryland ===
The Mountaineers and Maryland Terrapins have met on a semi-annual basis since 1919, recently rekindling a cross-border rivalry that was once the longest continuous non-conference series for these geographical neighbors. The Mountaineers lead the series 28–23–2 through the 2021 season.

=== Penn State ===
The series between West Virginia and Penn State has been historically one-sided. The teams met annually from 1947 to 1992. From 1959 to 1983, Penn State had won 25 consecutive meetings between the two. The series ended in 1992 with Penn State commencing Big Ten Conference play in 1993. On September 19, 2013, the schools announced that they would renew the series with two games in 2023 and 2024. Penn State leads the series 48–9–2 through the 2017 season.

=== Pittsburgh ===
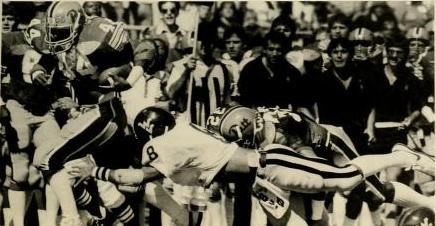
The Backyard Brawl with Pitt is WVU's fiercest rivalry.

In terms of competitiveness, intensity and longevity, the Backyard Brawl with the Pittsburgh Panthers is West Virginia's most fierce and storied rivalry. Separated by only 70 miles, the two universities have competed on a mostly annual basis since 1895 (beginning in 1920 and resuming again in 1943 after World War II). Although Pitt holds a 63–41–3 series lead, more than half of its victories in the Backyard Brawl came prior to 1952 when the Panthers dominated the series 34–9–1. The Mountaineers hold a 26–22–2 edge over the Panthers since 1962 when the series began to interchange annually between Morgantown and Pittsburgh. West Virginia has also won seven of the last ten meetings. After being put on hiatus following the 2011 season due to conference realignment, the series was renewed with four games running from 2022 to 2025 and 2029–2032.

In the first game of the restored Brawl, the Mountaineers lost to the Pittsburgh Panthers by a final score of 38 to 31. The 2024 version of the Brawl was held on Saturday, September 24, 2024, and was won by Pittsburgh with a final score of 38–34. The most recent Brawl occurred on Sept 13, 2025 a significant date calling back to an upset victory by Pittsburgh in the 2007 contest where an unranked Pitt team defeated a hopeful National Championship bound NO. 2 ranked WVU team 13–9. In the coaching return of Rich Rodriguez to the WVU program beginning the 2025 season, the Mountaineers gained some redemption in the rivalry with a win in the 2025 contest by a score of 31–24 in a thrilling overtime game. On September 12, 2025, it was announced both schools had agreed to an extension of the Backyard Brawl beginning in the 2029 season going through the 2036 campaign.

=== Syracuse ===
West Virginia also enjoyed a long-standing rivalry with the Syracuse Orange. The schools competed annually from 1955 to 2012, with the 1993 addition of the Ben Schwartzwalder Trophy being awarded to the victor. The significance of the trophy resides in the fact that Ben Schwartzwalder was a West Virginia native, former WVU player, and head coach at Syracuse. While Syracuse holds a 34–27 lead in the series, WVU won eight of the last ten games between the schools. Much like the status of the Backyard Brawl, Syracuse's departure from the Big East for the Atlantic Coast Conference and WVU's joining of the Big 12 Conference casts doubt over the future of the series.

=== Virginia Tech ===
The Mountaineers also enjoy a fierce rivalry with their Appalachia counterparts, the Virginia Tech Hokies. The schools once competed on an annual basis from 1973 to 2005, doing so as Big East Conference rivals starting in 1991. Beginning in 1997, West Virginia and Virginia Tech competed for the Black Diamond Trophy, symbolizing the Appalachian region's rich coal heritage. While West Virginia held a 28–22–1 advantage in the series, Virginia Tech won nine of the last 12 meetings between the schools. Since the Hokies departed the Big East for the ACC in 2004 and ended the series in 2006, the rivalry has been dormant. The rivalry was renewed with a neutral-site game in 2017, then was played in Morgantown in 2021 and was played in Blacksburg in the 2022 season. West Virginia leads the series with Virginia Tech 30–23–1 through the 2022 season.

== Individual awards ==
=== Heisman Trophy candidates ===
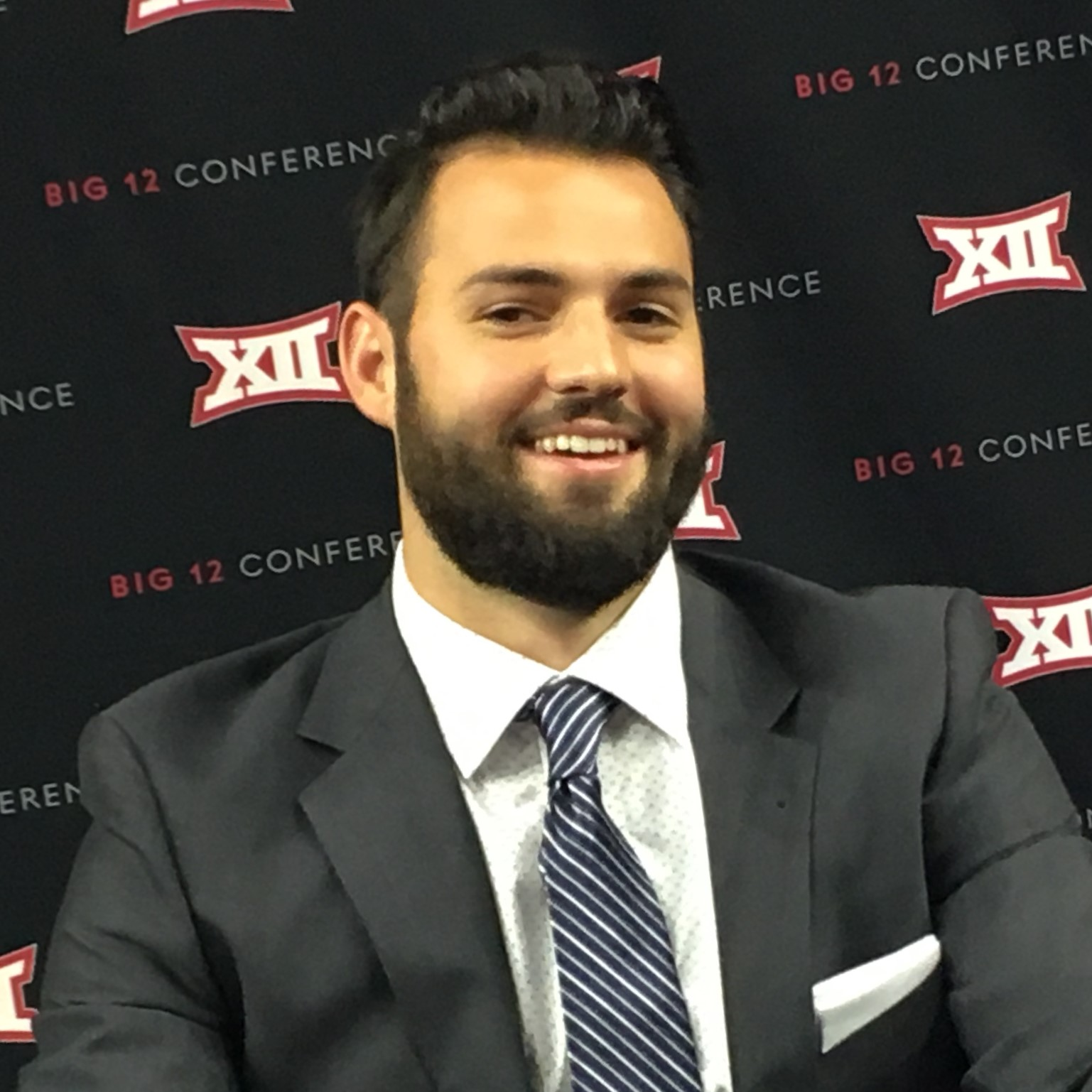
Will Grier, WVU quarterback (2017–2018) 4th place in Heisman Trophy voting in the 2018 season and the program's 3rd all-time leading passer.

West Virginia has produced seven Heisman Trophy candidates. Major Harris is the only Mountaineer to be considered as a finalist for the award, garnering consideration in the 1988 and 1989 seasons.

- Tavon Austin- WR/RS
  8th place (2012)
- Major Harris – QB
  3rd place (1989)
  5th place (1988)
- Will Grier – QB
  4th place (2018)
- Jeff Hostetler – QB
  7th place (1983)
- Steve Slaton – RB
  4th place (2006)
- Pat White – QB
  6th place (2007)
  7th place (2008)
- Amos Zereoué – RB
  10th place (1997)

=== National award winners and finalists ===
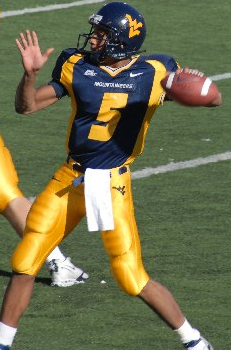
Pat White, two-time Heisman Trophy candidate and 2007 Archie Griffin Award recipient.

A total of 20 Mountaineer players and coaches have been finalists for numerous college football awards. Don Nehlen and Calvin Magee have won awards as coaches, while Dan Mozes, Pat White, and Tavon Austin have earned awards as players.

WVU Award Winners and Finalists

Season	Name	Pos.	Award
1985	Brian Jozwiak	OT	Lombardi
1985	Brian Jozwiak	OT	Outland
1988	Don Nehlen^{#}	HC	AFCA COY
1988	Don Nehlen^{#}	HC	Bobby Dodd
1988	Don Nehlen^{#}	HC	Walter Camp COY
1988	Major Harris	QB	Heisman
1989	Major Harris	QB	Heisman
1992	Mike Compton	G	Lombardi
1993	Don Nehlen^{#}	HC	Woody Hayes
1995	Aaron Beasley	CB	Jim Thorpe
1996	Canute Curtis	LB	Butkus
1996	Canute Curtis	LB	Nagurski

Season	Name	Pos.	Award
1996	Steve Dunlap	DC	Broyles
1998	Eric de Groh	C	Draddy
2003	Grant Wiley	LB	Nagurski
2004	Jeffrey Berk	OL	Draddy
2005	Jahmile Addae	S	Lott
2005	Dan Mozes	C	Rimington
2006	Jay Henry	LB	Draddy
2006	Dan Mozes	C	Outland
2006	Dan Mozes^{#}	C	Rimington
2006	Steve Slaton	RB	Doak Walker
2007	Calvin Magee^{#}	OC	AFCA Asst. COY
2007	Calvin Magee	OC	Broyles
2007	Rich Rodriguez	HC	Liberty Mutual COY
2007	Pat White^{#}	QB	Archie Griffin

Season	Name	Pos.	Award
2008	Pat McAfee	P	Ray Guy
2008	Pat White	QB	Unitas
2009	Reed Williams	LB	William V. Campbell
2012	Tavon Austin^{#}	WR/RS	Hornung
2012	Tavon Austin^{#}	RS	Rodgers
2012	Stedman Bailey	WR	Biletnikoff
2012	Geno Smith	QB	Unitas
2014	Kevin White	WR	Biletnikoff
2014	Josh Lambert	K	Groza
2016	Tyler Orlosky	C	Rimington
2016	Dana Holgorsen	HC	Bryant
2017	David Sills V	WR	Biletnikoff
2018	Will Grier	QB	Manning
2018	Will Grier	QB	Maxwell

Season	Name	Pos.	Award
2018	Will Grier	QB	Unitas
2018	Will Grier	QB	Walter Camp
2021	Sean Mahone	S	William V. Campbell
2023	Zach Frazier	C	William V. Campbell

# – Award winners

=== All-Americans ===
Forty-Seven Mountaineers have been recognized as First-Team All-Americans by various media selectors. Among those selections, 14 have achieved Consensus All-American status. Of those consensus All-Americans, four were unanimous selections.

WVU First-Team All-Americans

Season	Name	Pos.
1916	Ira Errett Rodgers	FB
1917	Russ Bailey	C
1917	Ira Errett Rodgers	FB
1919	Russ Bailey	C
1919	Ira Errett Rodgers*	FB
1922	Russ Meredith	OT
1924	Fred Graham	End
1924	Walter Mahan	G
1952	Paul Bischoff	End
1953	Bob Orders	C
1955	Bruce Bosley*	OT
1955	Sam Huff	OT
1969	Carl Crennel	OG

Season	Name	Pos.
1970	Jim Braxton	FB
1970	Dale Farley	LB
1973	Danny Buggs	WR
1974	Danny Buggs	WR
1982	Darryl Talley^{#}	LB
1983	Paul Woodside	K
1984	Rob Bennett	TE
1984	Willie Drewrey	RS
1984	Paul Woodside	K
1985	Brian Jozwiak*	OT
1988	Chris Haering	LB
1988	Bo Orlando	S
1988	Rick Phillips	OT

Season	Name	Pos.
1989	Major Harris	QB
1992	Mike Compton*	C
1993	Rich Braham	OT
1994	Todd Sauerbrun^{#}	P
1995	Aaron Beasley*	CB
1996	Canute Curtis*	LB
1998	John Thornton	DT
2003	Grant Wiley*	LB
2004	Adam Jones	CB
2006	Dan Mozes^{#}	C
2006	Steve Slaton^{#}	RB
2007	Steve Slaton	RB
2007	Ryan Stanchek	G

Season	Name	Pos.
2008	Pat McAfee	P
2008	Pat White	QB
2010	Robert Sands	S
2012	Tavon Austin	WR/RS
2012	Stedman Bailey	WR
2014	Kevin White	WR
2014	Mario Alford	RS
2015	Nick Kwiatkoski	LB
2017	David Sills V	WR
2020	Tykee Smith	S
2020	Darius Stills^{*}	DL
2023	Beanie Bishop^{*}	CB
2023	Zach Frazier	OL
2024	Wyatt Milum^{*}	OL

* – Consensus All-Americans
# – Unanimous All-Americans

=== Conference award winners ===
During WVU's 18-season tenure in the Southern Conference, a total of seven Mountaineers were recognized with superlative conference honors. Art Lewis received Coach of the Year distinction on consecutive occasions (1953 & 1954) while Bruce Bosley was named the SoCon Player of the Year and Jacobs Blocking Award winner in 1955. During WVU's 21 seasons in the Big East, a total of 12 Mountaineers were recognized with superlative conference honors. Don Nehlen (1993) and Rich Rodriguez (2003) were unanimous selections for Big East Coach of the Year, while Todd Sauerbrun was the unanimous selection for Big East Special Teams Player of the Year in 1994 and Amos Zereoué was the unanimous selection for Big East Rookie of the Year in 1996. Tavon Austin was WVU's first Big 12 Conference award recipient, garnering Co-Special Teams Player of the Year honors in 2012.

WVU Conference Award Winners

Season	Name	Pos.	Conference	Award
1953	Tommy Allman	RB	SoCon	Jacobs Blocking Award
1953	Art Lewis	Coach	SoCon	Coach of the Year
1954	Gene Lamone	G	SoCon	Jacobs Blocking Award
1954	Art Lewis	Coach	SoCon	Coach of the Year
1954	Fred Wyant	QB	SoCon	Player of the Year
1955	Bruce Bosley	OT	SoCon	Jacobs Blocking Award
1955	Bruce Bosley	OT	SoCon	Player of the Year
1957	Chuck Howley	C	SoCon	Jacobs Blocking Award
1966	Garrett Ford, Sr.	RB	SoCon	Player of the Year
1993	Don Nehlen	Coach	Big East	Coach of the Year^{#}
1994	Todd Sauerbrun	P	Big East	Special Teams Player of the Year^{#}
1996	Canute Curtis	LB	Big East	Defensive Player of the Year
1996	Amos Zereoué	RB	Big East	Rookie of the Year^{#}
2000	Grant Wiley	LB	Big East	Rookie of the Year
2003	Chris Henry	WR	Big East	Rookie of the Year
2003	Rich Rodriguez	Coach	Big East	Coach of the Year^{#}
2004	Adam Jones	RS	Big East	Special Teams Player of the Year
2004	Rasheed Marshall	QB	Big East	Offensive Player of the Year
2005	Rich Rodriguez	Coach	Big East	Coach of the Year
2005	Steve Slaton	RB	Big East	Rookie of the Year

Season	Name	Pos.	Conference	Award
2006	Pat White	QB	Big East	Offensive Player of the Year
2007	Pat White	QB	Big East	Offensive Player of the Year
2011	Tavon Austin	RS	Big East	Special Teams Player of the Year
2012	Tavon Austin	RS	Big 12	Co-Special Teams Player of the Year
2013	Charles Sims	RB	Big 12	Offensive Newcomer of the Year
2014	Shaq Riddick	DE	Big 12	Defensive Newcomer of the Year
2016	Justin Crawford	RB	Big 12	Offensive Newcomer of the Year
2017	Will Grier	QB	Big 12	Offensive Newcomer of the Year
2018	Yodny Cajuste	OL	Big 12	Offensive lineman of the Year
2018	David Long Jr.	LB	Big 12	Defensive Player of the Year
2019	Colton McKivitz	OL	Big 12	co-Offensive Lineman of the Year
2020	Tony Fields II	LB	Big 12	Defensive Newcomer of the Year
2020	Darius Stills	DL	Big 12	Defensive Lineman of the Year
2024	Wyatt Milum	OL	Big 12	Offensive Lineman of the Year
2024	Josiah Trotter	LB	Big 12	Defensive Freshman of the Year
# – Unanimous selection

=== All-Conference selections ===
==== Southern Conference ====
Bruce Bosley, 1955 Consensus All-American, three-time All-SoCon selection and College Football Hall of Fame inductee.

From 1950 to 1967, West Virginia competed in the Southern Conference. During their 18 seasons in the SoCon, a total of 35 Mountaineers were recognized as First-Team All-Southern Conference selections.

- 1952
  Ben Dunkerley – OT
- 1953
  Tommy Allman – RB
  Bruce Bosley – OT
  Gene Lamone – G
  Bill Marker – End
  Fred Wyant – QB
- 1954
  Bruce Bosley – OT
  Chick Donaldson – C
  Bill Hillen – End
  Gene Lamone – G
  Joe Marconi – FB
  Fred Wyant – QB
- 1955
  Bruce Bosley – OT
  Gene Lathey – G
  Bobby Moss – RB
  Fred Wyant – QB
- 1956
  Chuck Howley – C
  Larry Krutko – RB
  Gene Lathey – G
  Joe Nicely – G
  Bill Underdonk – OT
- 1957
  Chuck Howley – C
- 1958
  Dick Longfellow – RB
- 1959
  Bill Lopasky – G
- 1961
  Keith Melenyzer – G
  Bill Winter – DT
- 1962
  Pete Golmarac – C
  Gene Heeter – WR
  Glenn Holton – FB
  Jerry Yost – QB
- 1963
  Pete Golmarac – C
- 1964
  Gary Barnette – C
  Bill Sullivan – DE
  Donnie Young – LB
- 1965
  Bob Dunlevy – WR
  Garrett Ford, Sr. – RB
  Dick Leftridge – FB
  Stan Lysick – OT
  Bill Sullivan – DE
- 1966
  Baker Brown – LB
  Garrett Ford, Sr. – RB
  John Mallory – DB
  Danny Williamson – OT
- 1967
  Carl Crennel – LB
  George Henshaw – DT
  John Mallory – DB
  Danny Williamson – DE

==== Big East ====
The Mountaineers competed in the Big East Conference from 1991 to 2011. During their 21 seasons in the Big East, a total of 61 Mountaineers were recognized as First-Team All-Big East selections. Among those players, Tavon Austin (as a Return Specialist, 2011), Noel Devine, Pat White (2007), Eric Wicks (2006), Adam "Pac-Man" Jones (as a Cornerback, 2004), Grant Wiley (2003), Barrett Green, Canute Curtis, Aaron Beasley (1995), Todd Sauerbrun (1994) and Adrian Murrell (1992) were unanimous selections by the conference.

- 1991
  Mike Compton – C
  Adrian Murrell – RB
- 1992
  Mike Collins – S
  Mike Compton – C
  Adrian Murrell – RB*
  Todd Sauerbrun – P
  Lorenzo Styles – G
- 1993
  Rich Braham – OT
  Mike Baker – RS
  Tim Brown – LB
  Tom Robsock – G
  Todd Sauerbrun – P
- 1994
  Aaron Beasley – CB
  Barry Hawkins – DE
  Tom Robsock – G
  Todd Sauerbrun – P*
- 1995
  Aaron Beasley – CB*
- 1996
  Canute Curtis – LB*
  Mike Logan – CB
  David Saunders – WR
  Amos Zereoué – RB
  Vann Washington – S
- 1997
  Shawn Foreman – WR
  Solomon Page – OT
  Henry Slay – DE
  Gary Stills – LB
  Nate Terry – CB
  John Thornton – DT
  Amos Zereoué – RB
- 1998
  Shawn Foreman – WR
  Eric de Groh – C
  Solomon Page – OT
  Gary Stills – LB
  John Thornton – DT
  Amos Zereoué – RB
- 1999
  Avon Cobourne – RB
  Barrett Green – LB*
- 2002
  Avon Cobourne – RB
  Lance Nimmo – OT
  Grant Wiley – LB
- 2003
  Brian King – S
  Grant Wiley – LB*
  Quincy Wilson – RB
- 2004
  Jahmile Addae – S
  Jeff Berk – G
  Tim Brown – C
  Chris Henry – WR
  Adam Jones – CB*, RS
  Ben Lynch – DT
  Rasheed Marshall – QB
  Dan Mozes – G
- 2005
  Jahmile Addae – S
  Ernest Hunter – DT
  Garin Justice – OT
  Mike Lorello – S
  Kevin "Boo" McLee – LB
  Dan Mozes – C
- 2006
  Keilen Dykes – DT
  Dan Mozes – C
  Jeremy Sheffey – G
  Steve Slaton – RB
  Pat White – QB
  Eric Wicks – S*
- 2007
  Keilen Dykes – DT
  Greg Isdaner – G
  Pat White – QB*
  Eric Wicks – S
- 2008
  Mortty Ivy – LB
  Ryan Stanchek – OT
  Pat White – QB
- 2009
  Tyler Bitancurt – K
  Noel Devine – RB*
  Brandon Hogan – CB
  Robert Sands – S
  J. T. Thomas – LB
- 2010
  Chris Neild – DT
  Robert Sands – S
  Keith Tandy – CB
  J. T. Thomas – LB
- 2011
  Tavon Austin – WR, RS*
  Don Barclay – OT
  Najee Goode – LB
  Bruce Irvin – DE
  Geno Smith – QB
  Keith Tandy – CB

==== Big 12 ====
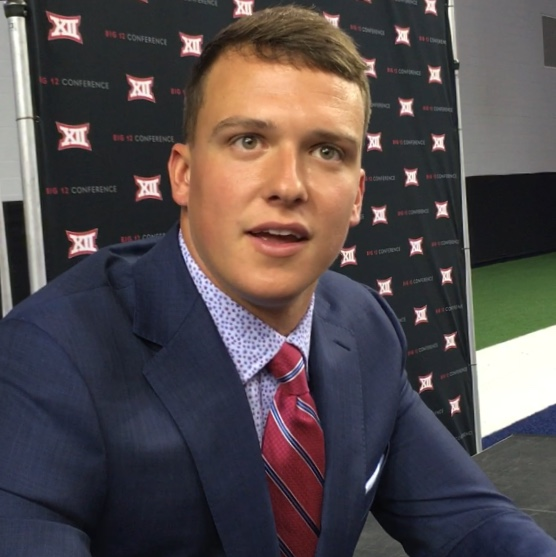
Wide receiver David Sills V, two-time first-team All-Big 12 selection.

Since joining the Big 12 Conference in 2012, 24 Mountaineers have been recognized as First-Team All-Big 12 selections.

- 2012
  Tavon Austin – WR, RS
  Stedman Bailey – WR
- 2013
  Charles Sims – RB
- 2014
  Kevin White – WR
  Karl Joseph – S
- 2015
  Nick Kwiatkoski – LB
  Nick O'Toole – P
  Daryl Worley – CB
- 2016
  Rasul Douglas – CB
  Tyler Orlosky – C
- 2017
  David Sills V – WR
- 2018
  Yodny Cajuste – OL
  David Long Jr. – LB
  Kenny Robinson Jr. – S
  David Sills V – WR
  Trevon Wesco – TE
- 2019
  Colton McKivitz – OL
  Darius Stills – DL
- 2020
  Leddie Brown – RB
  Tony Fields II – LB
  Darius Stills – DL
- 2021
  Dante Stills – DL
- 2022
  Zach Frazier – OL
  Dante Stills – DL
- 2023
  Zach Frazier – OL
  Beanie Bishop – DB
- 2024
  Wyatt Milum – OL
  TJ Jackson II – DL

=== Awards from within the program ===
==== Retired numbers ====
West Virginia has retired six jersey numbers. It is the highest possible accolade to achieve within the Mountaineer football program.

West Virginia Mountaineers retired numbers
No.	Player	Pos.	Tenure	No. ret.	Ref.
5	Pat White	QB	2004–2008	2026	
9	Major Harris	QB	1987–1989	2021	
21	Ira Errett Rodgers	QB/FB	1915–1917, 1919	2010	
66	Chuck Howley	G/C	1954–1957	2023	
75	Sam Huff	G/T	1952–1955	2005	
77	Bruce Bosley	T	1952–1955	2016	
90	Darryl Talley	LB	1979–1982	2021	

==== Mountaineer Legends Society ====
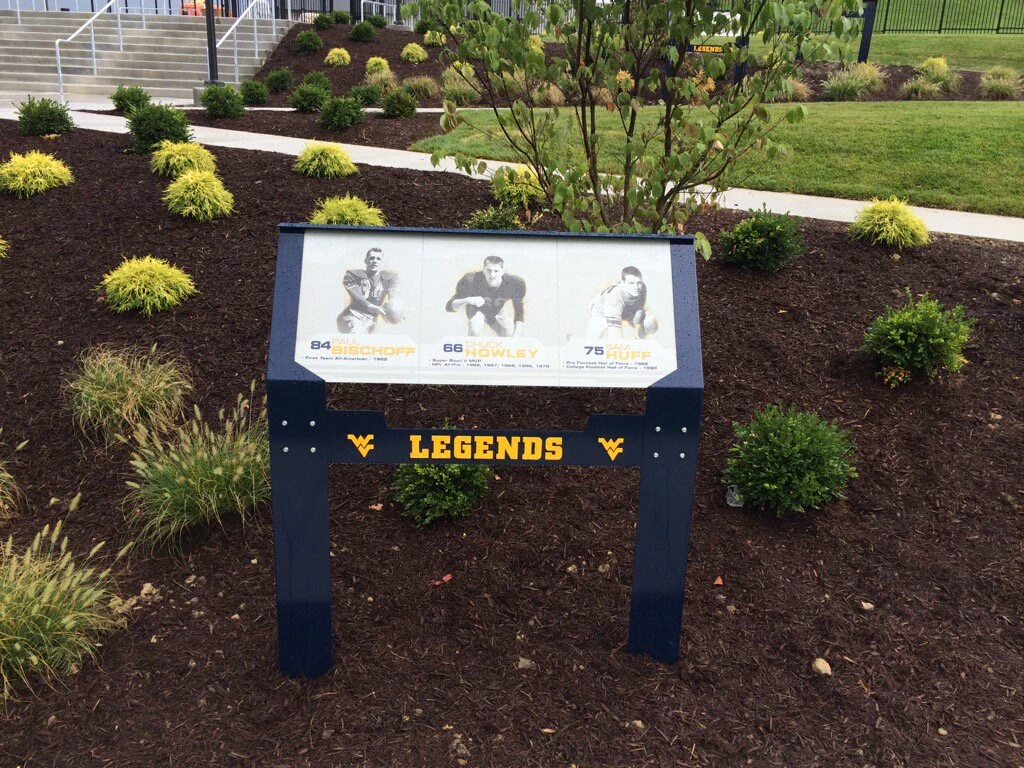
A plaque dedicated to Mountaineer Legends Society members Paul Bischoff, Chuck Howley and Sam Huff in the Legends Park area located on the north end of Mountaineer Field.

Introduced in 2016, the West Virginia University Mountaineer Legends Society is the second level of recognition for the WVU football program. The Legends Society program replaced the retirement of a jersey number, which had previously served as the second form of recognition. Jersey number retirement remains the highest attainable honor for the WVU football program.

Honors include addition into the team's Legends Park outside of Mountaineer Field and in graphics on column wraps around the stadium's concourse in a "ring of honor" configuration.

To be eligible, a coach, player or administrator must meet the following criteria:

- The individual must have demonstrated consistent and unique national excellence in his collegiate football career, his accomplishments must be significant on an individual and team basis and, in general, must have made a noteworthy contribution to the history of the football program.
- The individual must first be inducted into the WVU Sports Hall of Fame.
- If the individual is a former player or coach, he must accomplish one of a certain set of milestones.

The following individuals have been inducted into the Mountaineer Legends Society for their contributions to the Mountaineer football program:

- Russ Bailey
- Aaron Beasley
- Paul Bischoff
- Bruce Bosley
- Bobby Bowden
- Rich Braham
- Jim Braxton
- Danny Buggs
- Marc Bulger
- Harry Clarke
- Avon Cobourne
- Mike Compton
- Canute Curtis
- Willie Drewrey
- Garrett Ford, Sr.
- Fred Graham
- Major Harris
- Ken Herock
- Jeff Hostetler
- Chuck Howley
- Sam Huff
- Brian Jozwiak
- Oliver Luck
- Walter "Red" Mahan
- Joe Marconi
- Russ Meredith
- Dan Mozes
- Don Nehlen
- Bob Orders
- Bo Orlando
- Ira Errett Rodgers
- Clarence Spears
- Steve Slaton
- Joe Stydahar
- Darryl Talley
- Pat White
- Grant Wiley
- Tom Woodeshick
- Paul Woodside
- Fred Wyant
- Amos Zereoué

==== WVU Sports Hall of Fame ====
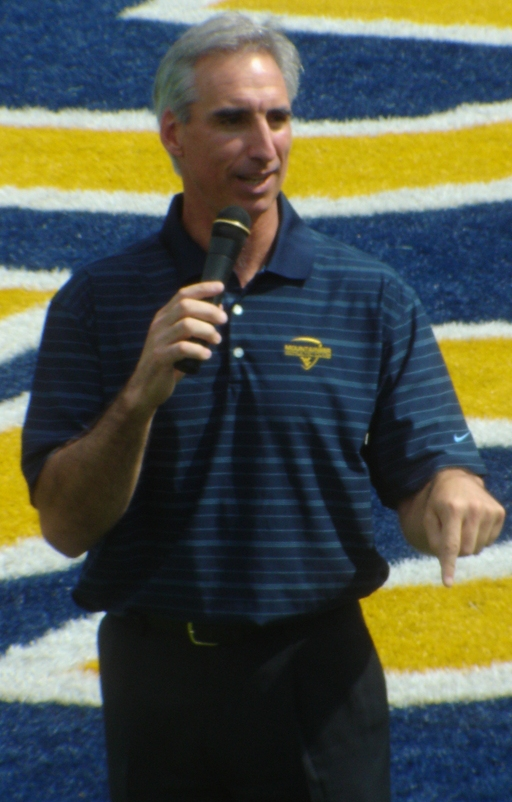
Oliver Luck, WVU Sports Hall of Fame inductee and Mountaineer Legends Society member.

The West Virginia University Sports Hall of Fame is the first level of recognition for past members of the Mountaineer football program. Former athletes, coaches and administrators are eligible for selection 10 years following their association with WVU athletics. It is the first step of recognition for former players, coaches and administrators. The following individuals have been inducted into the WVU Sports Hall of Fame for their contributions to the Mountaineer football program:

- Roger Alford
- Tommy Allman
- Russ Bailey
- Babe Barna
- Quentin Barnette
- Eddie Bartrug
- Aaron Beasley
- Paul Bischoff
- Bruce Bosley
- Rich Braham
- Jim Braxton
- Bobby Bowden
- Danny Buggs
- Marc Bulger
- Harry Clarke
- Avon Cobourne
- Mike Compton
- Gene Corum
- Carl Crennel
- Canute Curtis
- Noel Devine
- Dr. John Doyle
- Willie Drewrey
- Ben Dunkerley
- Garnet Edwards
- Garrett Ford, Sr.
- Marshall Glenn
- Jack Gocke
- Fred Graham
- Bob Gresham
- Floyd Hamilton
- Joseph Harrick
- Steve Harrick
- Major Harris
- George "Duke" Henshaw
- Ken Herock
- Charley Hockenberry
- Jerry Holmes
- Jeff Hostetler
- Chuck Howley
- Sam Huff
- James Jett
- Brian Jozwiak
- Bill Karr
- Tom Keane
- Larry Krutko
- Bruce Irvin
- Gene Lamone
- Gene Lathey
- E. Roy Lester
- Art "Pappy" Lewis
- Mike Logan
- Oliver Luck
- Walter "Red" Mahan
- John Mallory
- Joe Marconi
- Homer Martin
- Ross McHenry
- Russ Meredith
- Jeff Merrow
- Bobby Moss
- Dan Mozes
- Don Nehlen
- Steve Newberry
- Bob Orders
- Bo Orlando
- Artie Owens
- Tom Pridemore
- Ira Errett Rodgers
- Ben Schwartzwalder
- Charley Seabright
- Mike Sherwood
- Steve Slaton
- Jack Simons
- Clarence Spears
- Joe Stydahar
- Darryl Talley
- Jim Walthall
- Pat White
- Grant Wiley
- Tom Woodeshick
- Paul Woodside
- Fred Wyant
- Donnie Young
- Amos Zereoué

=== College Football Hall of Fame inductees ===
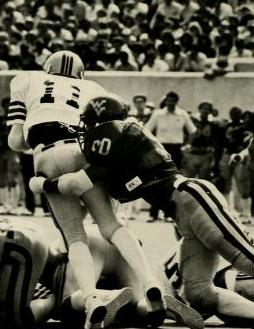
Darryl Talley, College Football Hall of Fame member from the Class of 2011.

The National Football Foundation, overseer of the College Football Hall of Fame, recognizes eleven individuals as WVU inductees. Conversely, the Mountaineer football program recognizes 14 individuals as inductees. (Note: The National Football Foundation inducted Spears as a player, and Yost and Schwartzwalder as coaches. Spears did not play for WVU, while Yost and Schwartzwalder never coached for WVU.)

Name	Position	Years at WVU	Inducted
Bruce Bosley ^{†}	OT	1952–1955	1982
Bobby Bowden ^{†}	Coach	1970–1975	2006
Frank Cignetti, Sr. ^{†}	Coach	1976–1979	2013
Major Harris ^{†}	QB	1987–1989	2009
Sam Huff ^{†}	LB	1952–1955	1980
Greasy Neale ^{†}	Coach	1931–1933	1967
Don Nehlen ^{†}	Coach	1980–2000	2005
Ira Errett Rodgers ^{†}	FB	1915–1919	1957
Ben Schwartzwalder ^{‡}	Coach	1930–1932 (player)	1982
Steve Slaton ^{†}	RB	2005-2007	2025
Clarence "Doc" Spears ^{‡}	G	1921–1924 (coach)	1982
Joe Stydahar ^{†}	OT	1933–1935	1972
Darryl Talley ^{†}	LB	1979–1982	2011
Fielding H. Yost ^{‡}	Coach	1895–1896 (player)	1951

† – Recognition by the National Football Foundation and WVU

‡ – Recognition by WVU

=== Pro Football Hall of Fame inductees ===
Joe Stydahar, one of three Mountaineers to be inducted in the Pro Football Hall of Fame.

Three Mountaineers hold the distinguished title of Pro Football Hall of Fame inductees.

Joe Stydahar, an offensive tackle, was inducted in 1967. Despite Stydahar's collegiate career, Chicago Bears owner/coach George Halas took a chance in selecting the little-known tackle with the Bears' first ever draft selection in the 1936 NFL draft. Halas's gamble paid off as "Jumbo Joe" produced a great playing career with the Bears, earning four NFL All-Star selections, six All-Pro selections, three NFL championships, and an induction into the NFL's All-Decade Team for the 1930s. Stydahar also served as head coach of the Los Angeles Rams and the Chicago Cardinals, winning the 1951 NFL Championship with the Rams. During his Hall of Fame enshrinement speech, Stydahar thanked his family and friends from his "dear state, West Virginia."

Sam Huff, a linebacker, was inducted in 1982. Originally a third round selection by the New York Giants in the 1956 NFL draft, Huff played for the Giants from 1956 to 1963 and later for the Washington Redskins from 1964 to 1969. Huff's football career, let alone his future in the NFL, almost never came to pass, however. When Huff was a junior in high school, WVU head coach Art Lewis came to his town to look at another prospect and recruited Huff instead. At the end of Huff's collegiate career Giants scout Al DeRogatis came to Morgantown to look at All-American guard Bruce Bosley. DeRogatis instead discovered Huff, proclaiming that "there's another guard here who will be even greater. His name is Sam Huff." Huff became a five-time Pro Bowl selection, a four-time First-Team All-Pro selection, an inductee in the NFL 1950s All-Decade Team, and was named as one of the 70 Greatest Redskins of all time. Huff was also recognized as the NFL's Top Linebacker in 1959.

Chuck Howley, a linebacker, was inducted in 2023. Selected by the Chicago Bears seventh overall in the 1958 NFL draft, he played for the Bears from 1958 to 1959, before briefly retiring from football, then returning to play for the Dallas Cowboys and played the remainder of his career for them. An original member of the Doomsday Defense, Howley received six Pro Bowl and five first-team All-Pro selections with the Cowboys, while appearing in two consecutive Super Bowls and winning Super Bowl VI. Howley was also named the MVP of Super Bowl V and is the only player on a losing team to receive the award.

== Mountaineers in the National Football League ==
=== NFL first round draft selections ===
WVU has produced a total of 198 NFL Draft selections.

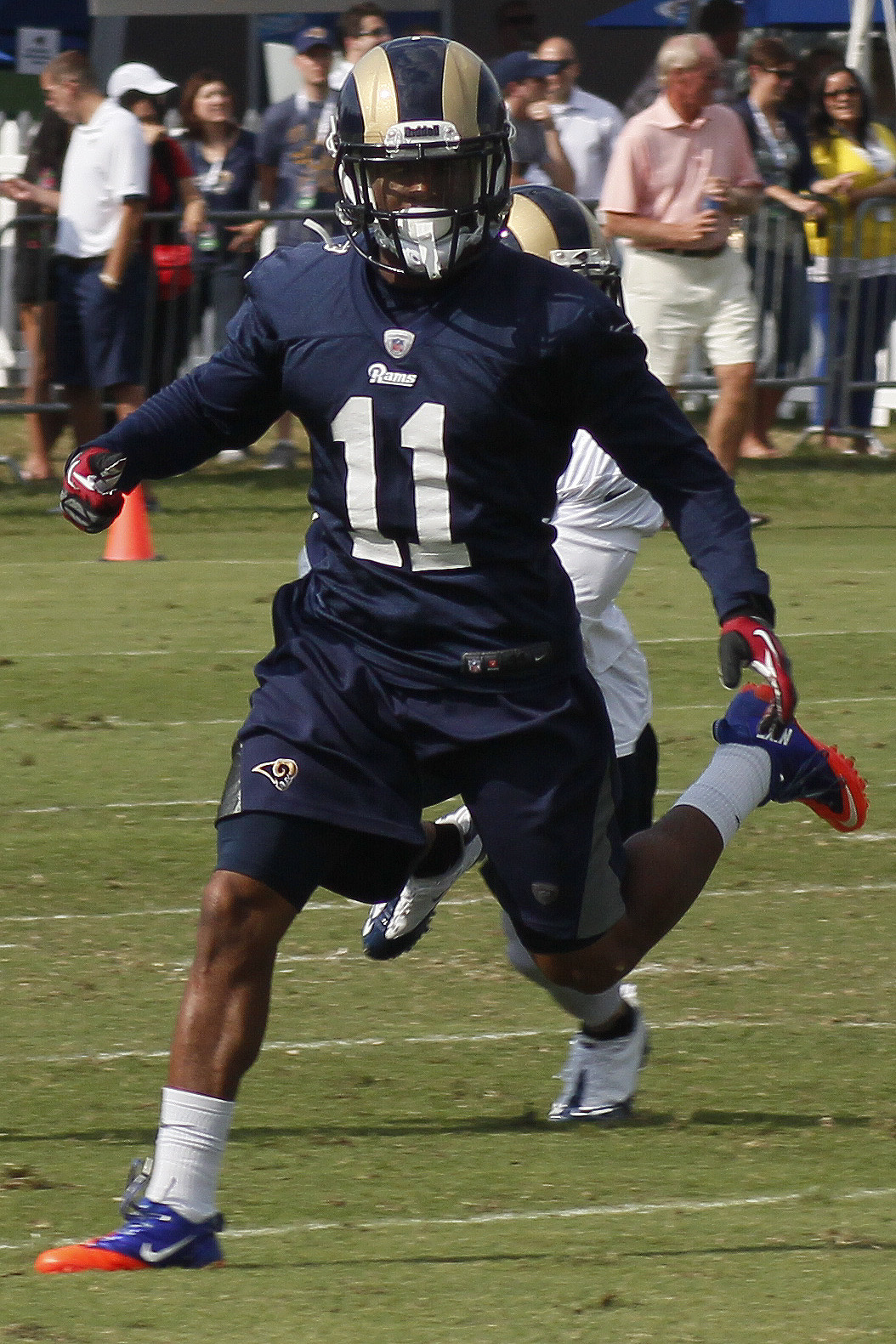
Tavon Austin, holder of multiple WVU records and 8th overall selection in the 2013 NFL draft.

Of those players selected in the draft, 12 Mountaineers have been selected in the first round.

- Joe Stydahar – OT
  1936: 6th overall, Chicago Bears
- Joe Marconi – RB
  1956: 6th overall, Los Angeles Rams
- Chuck Howley – G
  1958: 7th overall, Chicago Bears
- Dick Leftridge – RB
  1966, 3rd overall, Pittsburgh Steelers
- Brian Jozwiak – OT
  1986: 7th overall, Kansas City Chiefs
- Renaldo Turnbull – LB
  1990: 14th overall, New Orleans Saints
- Anthony Becht – TE
  2000: 27th overall, New York Jets
- Adam Jones – CB
  2005: 6th overall, Tennessee Titans
- Bruce Irvin – DE
  2012: 15th overall, Seattle Seahawks
- Tavon Austin – WR
  2013: 8th overall, St. Louis Rams
- Kevin White – WR
  2015: 7th overall, Chicago Bears
- Karl Joseph – S
  2016: 14th overall, Oakland Raiders

=== All-star and Pro Bowl honorees ===
Among the numerous Mountaineers that have participated in the NFL, a total of 32 have received all-star or Pro Bowl recognition.

- Al Baisi – T
  NFL All-Star (1940, 1941)
- Bruce Bosley – OL
  NFL Pro Bowl (1960, 1965, 1966, 1967)
  NFL All-Pro (1959, 1961)
- Marc Bulger – QB
  NFL Pro Bowl (2003, 2006)
- Harry Clarke – RB
  NFL All-Star (1940, 1941)
  NFL All-Pro (1943)
- Jeff Hostetler – QB
  NFL Pro Bowl (1994)
- Chuck Howley – LB
  NFL Pro Bowl (1965, 1966, 1967, 1968, 1969, 1971)
  NFL All-Pro (1966, 1967, 1968, 1969, 1970)
  Super Bowl V MVP
  Pro Football Hall of Fame inductee
- Sam Huff – LB
  NFL Pro Bowl (1958, 1959, 1960, 1961, 1964)
  NFL All-Pro (1957, 1958, 1959, 1960)
  NFL 1950s All-Decade Team
  Pro Football Hall of Fame inductee
- Adam Jones – CB/RS
  NFL All-Pro (2014)
- Tom Keane – CB
  NFL Pro Bowl (1953)
  NFL All-Pro (1953)
- Andy "Rip" King – RB
  NFL All-Pro (1920, 1921)
- Joe Marconi – FB
  NFL Pro Bowl (1963)
- Pat McAfee – P
  NFL Pro Bowl (2014)
  NFL All-Pro (2014)
- Todd Sauerbrun – P
  NFL Pro Bowl (2001, 2002, 2003)
  NFL All-Pro (2001, 2002, 2003)
- Geno Smith – QB
  NFL Pro Bowl (2022, 2023)
  NFL Comeback Player of the Year (2022)
- Gary Stills – LB
  NFL Pro Bowl (2003)
- Joe Stydahar – OT
  NFL All-Star (1938, 1939, 1940, 1941)
  NFL All-Pro (1937, 1938, 1939, 1940)
  NFL 1930s All-Decade Team
  Pro Football Hall of Fame inductee
- Darryl Talley – LB
  NFL Pro Bowl (1990, 1991)
  NFL All-Pro (1990, 1993)
- Renaldo Turnbull – LB
  NFL Pro Bowl (1993)
  NFL All-Pro (1993)
- Mike Vanderjagt – K
  NFL Pro Bowl (2003)
  NFL All-Pro (2003)
- Ron Wolfley – FB
  NFL Pro Bowl (1986, 1987, 1988, 1989)
  NFL All-Pro (1987)
- Tom Woodeshick – RB
  NFL Pro Bowl (1968)

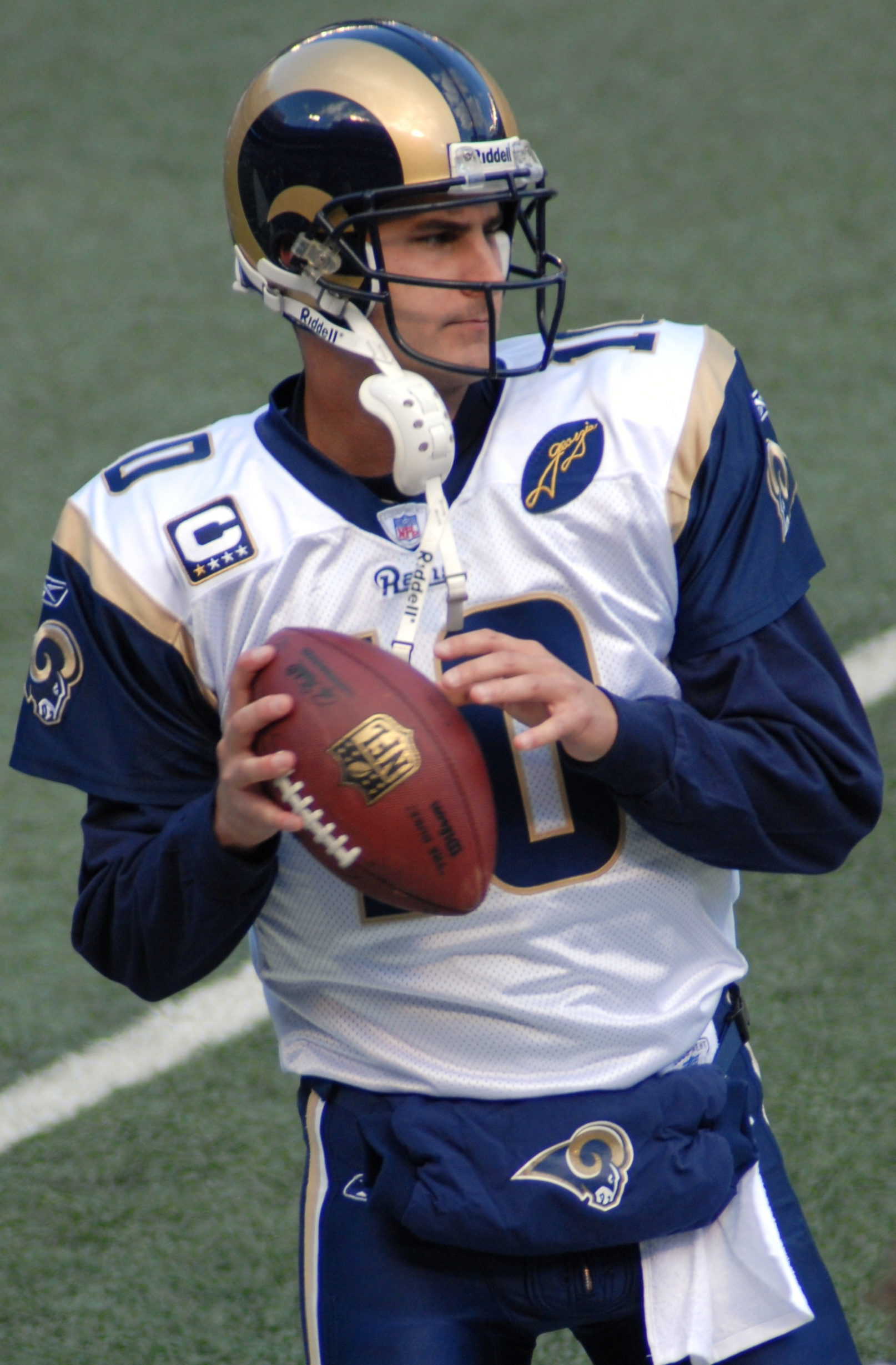
Marc Bulger, WVU's second all-time leading passer and two-time NFL Pro Bowl selection.

== Future conference opponents ==
2026	2027
at Utah	at Colorado
at Texas Tech	at Baylor
at TCU	at Oklahoma State
at Iowa State	at Kansas State
Arizona	at Cincinnati
Houston	Arizona State
Oklahoma State	BYU
Kansas	Iowa State
Cincinnati	UCF

== Future non-conference opponents ==
Announced schedules as of November 3, 2026.

2027	2028	2029	2030	2031	2032	2033	2034	2035	2036
Ohio	vs Tennessee^{2}	Ohio	Rhode Island	VMI	vs Virginia^{1}	at Pittsburgh	Pittsburgh	at Pittsburgh	Pittsburgh
Southern Miss	Youngstown State	at Pittsburgh	Pittsburgh	at Pittsburgh	Pittsburgh				
VMI	Akron	Robert Morris	Akron						

1. Neutral-site matchup with Virginia in 2032 will be played in Charlotte, North Carolina
2. Neutral-site matchup with Tennessee in 2028 will be played in Charlotte, North Carolina
- West Virginia will host Purdue in 2027. One of previous scheduled games (Ohio, Southern Miss, or VMI) will be canceled or rescheduled.
