= Walter Mahan =

American football player (1902–1990)

- Mahan from The Monticola West Virginia University Yearbook, 1926

Profile
- Position: Guard

Personal information
- Born: June 23, 1902; Follansbee, West Virginia, U.S.
- Died: May 10, 1990 (aged 87); Wheeling, West Virginia, U.S.
- Listed height: 5 ft 10 in (1.78 m)
- Listed weight: 210 lb (95 kg)

Career information
- College: West Virginia

Career history
- Frankford Yellow Jackets (1926)

Awards and highlights
- NFL champion (1926); 2× Third-team All-American (1924, 1925)
- Stats at Pro Football Reference

Walter Everett "Red" Mahan (June 23, 1902 – May 10, 1990) was an American football player. He played in the National Football League (NFL) for the Frankford Yellow Jackets in 1926 NFL season. Mahan won the 1926 NFL championship with the Yellow Jackets.

Prior to playing in the NFL, Mahan played college football at West Virginia University. While at West Virginia he was a four-year letterman during which time the Mountaineers lost only three games. In 1922, Mahan helped West Virginia to a 10–0–1 record. This earned the Mountaineers a trip to their first ever bowl game the San Diego East-West Christmas Classic. The game was held on December 22, 1922, in San Diego, California. West Virginia defeated Gonzaga, 21–13.

In 1924 Mahan, as a junior, helped the Mountaineers post an 8–1 overall record, totaling 302 points in nine contests, the most of any Eastern squad, and outscored the opposition by nearly a 7–1 margin. Mahan was a first-team All-American pick by Midweek Pictorial and Metropolitan News. Mahan was also named as a third-team All-American right guard by Walter Camp, and was selected to the all-Eastern team.

In 1925, Mahan captained the Mountaineers to another 8–1 mark. Mahan is also a member of the West Virginia all-time team for 1919 to 1929. He was inducted into the West Virginia University Sports Hall of Fame in 1999.

After his year with the Yellow Jackets, Mahan went on to a career as a prosecuting attorney in Brooke County, West Virginia. He died in 1990.
