= The Pride of West Virginia =

Marching band of West Virginia University

The Pride of West Virginia The Mountaineer Marching Band
- School: West Virginia University
- Location: Morgantown, West Virginia
- Conference: Big 12
- Founded: 1901
- Director: Dr. Cheldon Williams
- Members: 340 (varies)
- Fight song: "Hail West Virginia, Fight Mountaineers, "Mountaineer March", "On West Virginia""

Uniform
- Gold, Blue, and White. White jacket with flying WV embroidery. Blue pants with gold stripe and white shoes. Blue and white helmet with choice of white, gold, or blue feather plumes. Gold and blue double-sided cape with flying WV.

The Mountaineer Marching Band, known as The Pride of West Virginia, is the marching band of West Virginia University located in Morgantown, West Virginia. The band was awarded the prestigious Sudler Trophy by the John Philip Sousa Foundation in 1997.

== History ==
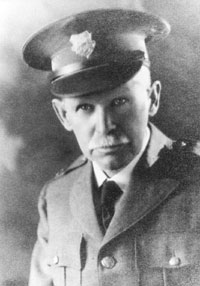
Walter Mestrezat led West Virginia University's marching band for 37 years as its founding director.

The band was formed in 1901 as an all-male ROTC Band with only eight members. The founding director, Walter Mestrezat, was a band leader during the Spanish–American War who led the First West Virginia Regiment in Cuba. The band's membership was exclusive to male ROTC members from its founding until 1925, when eleven non-ROTC males were allowed to join the band with limited benefits. Citing the favorable bias toward military band members the eleven formed a "rebel" band. To gain recognition as an official student organization, the group formed WVU's initial Omicron Chapter of Kappa Kappa Psi. Through the efforts of WVU president Frank Trotter, the rebel and ROTC bands were successfully merged into the University Marching Band.

WVU's Military Department soon reached an agreement with the School of Music, allowing the band to be recognized as an official WVU music organization. Mestrezat increased the band's membership to approximately 70 members during his 37-year reign as the founding director. He retired in 1938, when Bernard McGregor became the band's second director.

The 1950s and 1960s began a new era in the marching band's history where it flourished largely under the direction of Larry Intravaia and Budd Udell. WVU's fight songs, "Fight Mountaineers" and "Hail West Virginia" were arranged for the band by Budd Udell during this era. They are the same arrangements the band plays today. The new songs and performances garnered the group significantly more attention than it had received in the past.

1971 began the 34-year era of Don Wilcox, who served as Director of Bands from 1971 to 2005 and Director of the Marching Band from 1971 to 1997. During Wilcox's inaugural year the band was still limited to all-male membership and consisted of 88 members. The following year Wilcox endorsed women to become official members, marking the first time in the band's history (other than the World War II era) that woman were allowed to join the band. The 1970s saw one of the greatest periods of growth for the program through the efforts of its leadership and the band's association with the Mountaineer football team. As the football team became more renowned, the band garnered more exposure as well. The band performed at NFL games and two Peach Bowls in Atlanta. During the 1975 Peach Bowl, an announcer coined the phrase "The Pride of West Virginia", a term that would eventually become the band's official nickname.

After Don Wilcox's retirement in 2005, John Hendricks became WVU's Director of Bands and Jay Drury, then assistant director, was named the 11th director of the WVU Marching Band. In 2008 the band grew to over 390 members, becoming the largest WVU Marching Band since 1986, when the band fielded 400. In 2017, Scott Tobias was announced to be the 12th director of the WVU Marching band, while holding the position of Director of Bands. In 2018 Dr. Stephen Lytle was named the Associate Director of Bands at WVU which made him the 13th director of The Pride of West Virginia. On May 28, 2020, Dr. Cheldon Williams was announced as Dr. Lytle's replacement as Associate Director of Bands and, accordingly, Director of the WVU Marching Band.

== Traditions ==
During its traditional pre-game performance, the WVU drumline enters Mountaineer Field through the home-side tunnel and performs the "Tunnel" and "Boogie" cadences. When complete, the remaining band members emerge from the south end-zone tunnels to a spirited, 220-beats per minute run-on cadence. The band forms several iconic images during its pre-game show including the Flying WV, the initials WVU, expanding circles, and an outline of the state of West Virginia. The band plays several university songs and favorites including "The West Virginia Hills","Country Roads", "Hail, West Virginia", "Simple Gifts" (from Appalachian Spring), "Fight, Mountaineers", "Mountain Dew", and the "West Virginia University Alma Mater".

=== Formation of the State ===
The band forms the outline of the state of West Virginia during the pregame show of all home Mountaineer football games. The outline moves down the field during the playing of "Hail West Virginia", and the shape inverts to face the student side of the stadium when the crowd begins the "Let's Go...Mountaineers" chant.

West Virginia is one of only two U.S. states with two panhandles, the other is Alaska. West Virginia features an irregular oval body formed mostly by the Ohio River and a straight northern border formed by the Mason–Dixon line. The unique shape creates a complex formation on the football field. Adding to the difficulty of the performance is the inversion of the formation, the motion of the band members around the border of the state, and the movement of the outline across the field.

=== Simple Gifts ===
While the song was originally performed by the band during the 1973 halftime show, Aaron Copland's Simple Gifts has become a pregame tradition. Soon after its debut as a pregame selection, then band director Don Wilcox decided to exclude the song from the show for one year. However, the high demand for Simple Gifts to be reinstated caused Wilcox to add the performance into the very next pregame show.

The highlight of the performance begins when the band gathers in a circular formation in the center of the field. After a drum roll the colorguard thrust gold and blue flags into the air, raising and lowering them for emphasis, as the outer circle kneels, creating a two tiers of instruments for maximum sound during the fanfare of the arrangement. The formation then expands in concentric circles as the band begins the reprise.

Simple Gifts..	Initials.	State outline..	Football team..
Circles formed during "Simple Gifts".	WVU initials formed during pregame.	State outline during "Hail, West Virginia".	Football team enters the field.

== Composition ==
Any student at West Virginia University is eligible for membership pending an audition. The band currently has 302 members.

=== Direction ===
Dr. Cheldon Williams is currently the director of the Mountaineer Marching Band and holds the position of Associate Director of Bands. He also directs the Symphonic Band and other athletic pep bands, while Director of Bands Dr. Scott Tobias serves as the conductor of the WVU Wind Symphony. Don Wilcox, who served as Director of Bands for 34 years at WVU, a tenure that included 28 years as director of the marching band, currently holds the title of Director of Bands Emeritus.

== Performances ==
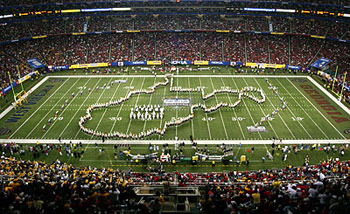
The Pride of West Virginia at the 2006 Nokia Sugar Bowl

The band performs at every home football game and makes several local and national appearances throughout the year. When traveling the band requires nine charter buses, or equivalently two charter planes, to accommodate the band membership, faculty, and equipment needed for performances. "The Pride Travel Fund" was created before the 2008 season to help offset these costs. In the past decade alone the band has traveled to the states of Alabama, Arizona, Connecticut, Florida, Georgia, Indiana, Kentucky, Louisiana, Maryland, North Carolina, New York, Ohio, Oklahoma, Pennsylvania, Tennessee, Virginia and the District of Columbia.

The band is sometimes referred to as an ambassador of the state of West Virginia, often being selected to represent the state at political events. The band was invited to the Inaugural Parades of Richard Nixon in 1969 and Ronald Reagan in 1985. In the fall of 2005 the band celebrated Constitution Day with a performance on the National Mall that was attended by Robert C. Byrd, one of West Virginia's two representatives in the US Senate. In 2008 the band performed at the inauguration of West Virginia Governor Joe Manchin in Charleston.

The band has performed at many bowl games due to its close association to the Mountaineer football team. The band performed at WVU's first BCS Bowl Game, the 2006 Nokia Sugar Bowl, in Atlanta, Georgia. Significant national television coverage was provided for the band's pregame and halftime performances during the 2008 Tostitos Fiesta Bowl in Glendale, Arizona. The Pride also performed at the 2012 Discover Orange Bowl in Miami, Florida as the Mountaineers blew out the Clemson Tigers 70-33. The band has recently traveled to Atlanta, Georgia for the 2014 Chick-fil-A Kickoff Game as the Mountaineers played against the University of Alabama. In November 2016, and again in November 2024, the band went to New York City for the annual Macy's Thanksgiving Day Parade.

== Accolades ==
In 1997, the WVU band was awarded the Sudler Trophy by the John Philip Sousa Foundation.
