= Patricia White =

Patricia White may refer to:

- Patricia White (actress) (1922–2016), American performer, a.k.a. Patricia Barry
- Patricia Lorrain-Ann White (born 1928), Canadian-American ballerina, a.k.a. Patricia Wilde
- Patricia Lynne White (born 1964), Australian politician and business executive, a.k.a. Trish White
- Pat White (politician) (1948–2024), American politician for West Virginia
