= Patrick Franklin White =

Canadian journalist (born 1981)

Patrick White (born 1981, in Sechelt, British Columbia, Canada) is a prize-winning Canadian journalist and author. White worked in his parents' publishing firm, Harbour Publishing during his high school years in Pender Harbour and attended the University of Victoria, graduating in 2003 with a BA in history followed by a masters in journalism at Columbia University in 2006. He has worked for Newsweek, The New York Post, Toro, The Walrus and currently serves as National Correspondent for The Globe and Mail in Toronto, Ontario. In 2004 he published the book Mountie in Mukluks, an irreverent look at the work of the Royal Canadian Mounted Police in the Canadian Arctic during the 1930s., In 2007 he received a National Magazine Awards Gold Medal for his feature "Red Rush," published in The Walrus. In 2009 White served as an embedded journalist with the Canadian Armed Forces in Kandahar, Afghanistan. In April 2012 he won the 2011 National Newspaper Award for best Long Feature for an anniversary piece on the founding of Nunavut., followed in 2015 by another NNA award for his expose of Canada's overuse of solitary confinement, "Who Killed Eddie Snowshoe?" In 2016 he won his third NNA in the category of Beat Reporting and has since added a fourth NNA.

== Bibliography ==
- White, Patrick (2004) Mountie in Mukluks (Harbour Publishing) ISBN 978-1-55017-352-9
- White, Patrick (2007) "Red Rush", The Walrus, April, 2007
- White. Patrick (2015) , The Globe and Mail, December 5, 2014
