= West Virginia Mountaineers football statistical leaders =

The West Virginia Mountaineers Football Statistical Leaders are individual statistical leaders of the West Virginia Mountaineers Football program in various categories, including passing, rushing, receiving, total offense, all-purpose yardage, defensive stats, and kicking. Within those areas, the lists identify single-game, single-season, and career leaders. The Mountaineers represent West Virginia University in the NCAA's Big 12 Conference.

Although West Virginia began competing in intercollegiate football in 1891, the school's official record book considers the "modern era" to have begun in 1933. Records from before this year are often incomplete and inconsistent, and they are generally not included in these lists. However, the West Virginia Football Media Guide does include the touchdown statistics, although not the yards, of Ira Errett Rodgers, who played for the Mountaineers from 1915 to 1919.

These lists are dominated by more recent players for several reasons:

- Since 1933, seasons have increased from 10 games to 11 and then 12 games in length.
- The NCAA didn't allow freshmen to play varsity football until 1972 (with the exception of the World War II years), allowing players to have four-year careers.
- Bowl games only began counting toward single-season and career statistics in 2002. The Mountaineers have played in 14 bowl games since the decision, with a 15th now assured in 2018, giving players an extra game to accumulate statistics.
- The Mountaineers ran a high-octane spread option offense under head coaches Rich Rodriguez (2001-2007) and Bill Stewart (2008-2010), which emphasized mobile quarterbacks and no huddling, allowing the teams to rack up very large numbers of yards. Since Dana Holgorsen took over in 2011, the Mountaineers have run more of an air raid spread attack, emphasizing passing on most plays. This has led to many school passing and receiving records being set. In particular, a 70–63 win over Baylor in 2012 saw more than 1,500 offensive yards between the two teams combined, and 10 single-game entries on the lists below.

These lists are updated through Week 12 of the 2026 season. Active players are listed in bold.

== Passing ==
=== Passing yards ===
Career
Rank	Player	Yards	Years
1	Geno Smith	11,662	2009 2010 2011 2012
2	Marc Bulger	8,153	1996 1997 1998 1999
3	Will Grier	7,354 (Note: Grier began his college career at Florida, playing there in 2015 before transferring to WVU after that season.)	2017 2018
4	Skyler Howard	7,302	2014 2015 2016
5	Jarret Doege	6,453	2019 2020 2021
6	Pat White	6,049	2005 2006 2007 2008
7	Chad Johnston	5,954	1993 1994 1995 1996
8	Oliver Luck	5,765	1978 1979 1980 1981
9	Rasheed Marshall	5,558	2001 2002 2003 2004
10	Garrett Greene	5,370	2020 2021 2022 2023 2024

Single season
Rank	Player	Yards	Year
1	Geno Smith	4,385	2011
2	Geno Smith	4,205	2012
3	Will Grier	3,864	2018
4	Marc Bulger	3,607	1998
5	Will Grier	3,490	2017
6	Skyler Howard	3,328	2016
7	Clint Trickett	3,285	2014
8	Skyler Howard	3,145	2015
9	Jarret Doege	3,048	2021
10	Geno Smith	2,763	2010

Single game
Rank	Player	Yards	Year	Opponent
1	Geno Smith	656	2012	Baylor
2	Will Grier	539	2018	Oklahoma
3	Skyler Howard	532	2015	Arizona State (Cactus Bowl)
4	Clint Trickett	511	2014	Maryland
5	Michael Hawkins Jr.	464	2026	Cincinnati
6	Geno Smith	463	2011	LSU
7	Geno Smith	450	2011	Connecticut
8	Marc Bulger	429	1998	Missouri
	Will Grier	429	2018	Tennessee
10	Mike Sherwood	416	1968	Pittsburgh

=== Passing touchdowns ===
Career
Rank	Player	TDs	Years
1	Geno Smith	98	2009 2010 2011 2012
2	Will Grier	71	2017 2018
3	Skyler Howard	60	2014 2015 2016
4	Marc Bulger	59	1996 1997 1998 1999
5	Pat White	56	2005 2006 2007 2008
6	Rasheed Marshall	45	2001 2002 2003 2004
7	Oliver Luck	43	1978 1979 1980 1981
	Chad Johnston	43	1993 1994 1995 1996
9	Major Harris	41	1987 1988 1989
10	Jarret Doege	40	2019 2020 2021

Single season
Rank	Player	TDs	Year
1	Geno Smith	42	2012
2	Will Grier	37	2018
3	Will Grier	34	2017
4	Marc Bulger	31	1998
	Geno Smith	31	2011
6	Skyler Howard	26	2015
	Skyler Howard	26	2016
8	Geno Smith	24	2010
9	Pat White	21	2008
10	Oliver Luck	19	1980
	Rasheed Marshall	19	2004
	Jarret Doege	19	2021

Single game
Rank	Player	TDs	Year	Opponent
1	Geno Smith	8	2012	Baylor
2	Marc Bulger	6	1998	Pittsburgh
	Geno Smith	6	2011	Clemson (Orange Bowl)
4	Allen McCune	5	1965	Pittsburgh
	Brad Lewis	5	2000	Ole Miss (Music City Bowl)
	Pat White	5	2008	Villanova
	Geno Smith	5	2012	James Madison
	Skyler Howard	5	2015	Arizona State (Cactus Bowl)
	Skyler Howard	5	2016	Youngstown State
	Will Grier	5	2017	East Carolina
	Will Grier	5	2017	Texas Tech
	Will Grier	5	2017	Baylor
	Will Grier	5	2018	Tennessee
	Will Grier	5	2018	Kansas State

== Rushing ==
=== Rushing yards ===
Career
Rank	Player	Yards	Years
1	Avon Cobourne	5,164	1999 2000 2001 2002
2	Pat White	4,480	2005 2006 2007 2008
3	Noel Devine	4,315	2007 2008 2009 2010
4	Amos Zereoué	4,086	1996 1997 1998
5	Steve Slaton	3,923	2005 2006 2007
6	Leddie Brown	2,888	2018 2019 2020 2021
7	Arthur Owens	2,648	1972 1973 1974 1975
8	Robert Walker	2,620	1993 1994 1995
9	Quincy Wilson	2,608	1999 2001 2002 2003
10	Wendell Smallwood	2,462	2013 2014 2015

Single season
Rank	Player	Yards	Year
1	Steve Slaton	1,744	2006
2	Avon Cobourne	1,710	2002
3	Amos Zereoué	1,589	1997
4	Wendell Smallwood	1,519	2015
5	Noel Devine	1,465	2009
6	Amos Zereoué	1,462	1998
7	Quincy Wilson	1,380	2003
8	Pat White	1,335	2007
9	Avon Cobourne	1,298	2001
10	Robert Walker	1,250	1993

Single game
Rank	Player	Yards	Year	Opponent
1	Tavon Austin	344	2012	Oklahoma
2	Kay-Jay Harris	337	2004	East Carolina
3	Justin Crawford	331	2016	Oklahoma
4	Dustin Garrison	291	2011	Bowling Green
5	Kerry Marbury	291	1971	Temple
6	Avon Cobourne	260	2002	East Carolina
7	Pat White	247	2006	Syracuse
8	Amos Zereoué	234	1997	Notre Dame
9	Amos Zereoué	228	1998	Rutgers
10	Pat White	220	2005	Pittsburgh
	Pat White	220	2006	Pittsburgh
	Noel Devine	220	2009	Colorado

=== Rushing touchdowns ===
Career
Rank	Player	TDs	Years
1	Steve Slaton	50	2005 2006 2007
2	Pat White	47	2005 2006 2007 2008
3	Ira Errett Rodgers	42	1915 1916 1917 1918 1919
	Avon Cobourne	42	1999 2000 2001 2002
5	Amos Zereoué	40	1996 1997 1998
6	CJ Donaldson Jr.	30	2022 2023 2024
7	Noel Devine	29	2007 2008 2009 2010
8	Garrett Greene	28	2020 2021 2022 2023 2024
9	Leddie Brown	27	2018 2019 2020 2021
10	Rasheed Marshall	24	2001 2002 2003 2004

Single season
Rank	Player	TDs	Year
1	Ira Errett Rodgers	19	1919
2	Amos Zereoué	18	1997
	Steve Slaton	18	2006
4	Avon Cobourne	17	2002
	Steve Slaton	17	2005
	Steve Slaton	17	2007
7	Kerry Marbury	16	1972
	Pat White	16	2006
9	Pat White	14	2007
10	Amos Zereoué	13	1998
	Rasheed Marshall	13	2002
	Noel Devine	13	2009
	Leddie Brown	13	2021
	Garrett Greene	13	2023

Single game
Rank	Player	TDs	Year	Opponent
1	George Allen	5	1932	Marquette
	Steve Slaton	5	2005	Louisville

== Receiving ==
=== Receptions ===
Career
Rank	Player	Rec	Years
1	Tavon Austin	288	2009 2010 2011 2012
2	Stedman Bailey	210	2010 2011 2012
3	Jock Sanders	206	2007 2008 2009 2010
4	David Saunders	191	1995 1996 1997 1998
5	Sam James	190	2018 2019 2020 2021 2022
6	Daikiel Shorts	177	2013 2014 2015 2016
7	Shawn Foreman	169	1995 1996 1997 1998
8	Gary Jennings Jr.	168	2015 2016 2017 2018
9	Khori Ivy	160	1997 1998 1999 2000
10	Antonio Brown	155	1998 1999 2000 2001

Single season
Rank	Player	Rec	Year
1	Stedman Bailey	114	2012
	Tavon Austin	114	2012
3	Kevin White	109	2014
4	Tavon Austin	101	2011
5	Gary Jennings Jr.	97	2017
6	Shawn Foreman	77	1997
	David Saunders	77	1998
8	David Saunders	76	1996
9	Jock Sanders	72	2009
	Stedman Bailey	72	2011

Single game
Rank	Player	Rec	Year	Opponent
1	Kevin White	16	2014	Texas
2	Tavon Austin	14	2012	Baylor
	Stedman Bailey	14	2012	Oklahoma State
	Sam James	14	2019	Texas Tech
5	Stedman Bailey	13	2012	Oklahoma
	Stedman Bailey	13	2012	Baylor
	J.D. Woods	13	2012	Baylor
	Stedman Bailey	13	2012	James Madison
	Tavon Austin	13	2012	Maryland
	Kevin White	13	2014	Maryland
	Kevin White	13	2014	Texas Tech

=== Receiving yards ===
Career
Rank	Player	Yards	Years
1	Tavon Austin	3,413	2009 2010 2011 2012
2	Stedman Bailey	3,218	2010 2011 2012
3	David Saunders	2,608	1995 1996 1997 1998
4	Khori Ivy	2,402	1997 1998 1999 2000
5	Shawn Foreman	2,347	1995 1996 1997 1998
6	Gary Jennings Jr.	2,294	2015 2016 2017 2018
7	Daikiel Shorts	2,263	2013 2014 2015 2016
8	Sam James	2,229	2018 2019 2020 2021 2022
9	Rahsaan Vanterpool	2,022	1993 1994 1995 1996
10	Jock Sanders	1,980	2007 2008 2009 2010

Single season
Rank	Player	Yards	Year
1	Stedman Bailey	1,622	2012
2	Kevin White	1,447	2014
3	Tavon Austin	1,289	2012
4	Stedman Bailey	1,279	2011
5	Tavon Austin	1,186	2011
6	Gary Jennings Jr.	1,096	2017
7	David Saunders	1,043	1996
8	Chris Henry	1,006	2003
9	Ka'Raun White	1,004	2017
10	David Sills V	980	2017

Single game
Rank	Player	Yards	Year	Opponent
1	Stedman Bailey	303	2012	Baylor
2	Stedman Bailey	225	2012	Oklahoma State
	Gary Jennings Jr.	225	2018	Oklahoma
4	Sam James	223	2019	Texas Tech
5	Kevin White	216	2014	Maryland
6	Mario Alford	215	2013	Iowa State
	Tavon Austin	215	2012	Baylor
8	Chris Henry	209	2003	Syracuse
9	Stedman Bailey	205	2012	Oklahoma
	Pat Greene	205	1997	Pittsburgh
	Rahsaan Vanterpool	205	1994	Pittsburgh

=== Receiving touchdowns ===
Career
Rank	Player	TDs	Years
1	Stedman Bailey	41	2010 2011 2012
2	David Sills V	35	2015 2017 2018
3	Tavon Austin	29	2009 2010 2011 2012
4	Cedric Thomas	23	1976 1977 1978 1979 1980
5	Chris Henry	22	2003 2004
6	Khori Ivy	19	1997 1998 1999 2000
	Darius Reynaud	19	2005 2006 2007
8	Reggie Rembert	18	1988 1989
	David Saunders	18	1995 1996 1997 1998
10	Shelton Gibson	17	2014 2015 2016
	Gary Jennings Jr.	17	2015 2016 2017 2018

Single season
Rank	Player	TDs	Year
1	Stedman Bailey	25	2012
2	David Sills V	18	2017
3	David Sills V	15	2018
4	Gary Jennings Jr.	13	2018
5	Chris Henry	12	2004
	Darius Reynaud	12	2007
	Stedman Bailey	12	2011
	Tavon Austin	12	2012
	Ka'Raun White	12	2017
10	Reggie Rembert	11	1989
	Mario Alford	11	2014

Single game
Rank	Player	TDs	Year	Opponent
1	Stedman Bailey	5	2012	Baylor

== Total offense ==
Total offense is the sum of passing and rushing statistics. It does not include receiving or returns.

=== Total offense yards ===
Career
Rank	Player	Yards	Years
1	Geno Smith	12,004	2009 2010 2011 2012
2	Pat White	10,529	2005 2006 2007 2008
3	Skyler Howard	8,407	2014 2015 2016
4	Marc Bulger	7,827	1996 1997 1998 1999
5	Rasheed Marshall	7,598	2001 2002 2003 2004
6	Garrett Greene	7,506	2020 2021 2022 2023 2024
7	Will Grier	7,386	2017 2018
8	Major Harris	7,334	1987 1988 1989
9	Oliver Luck	6,282	1978 1979 1980 1981
10	Jarret Doege	6,170	2019 2020 2021

Single season
Rank	Player	Yards	Year
1	Geno Smith	4,356	2012
2	Geno Smith	4,352	2011
3	Skyler Howard	3,791	2016
4	Will Grier	3,774	2018
5	Skyler Howard	3,647	2015
6	Will Grier	3,612	2017
7	Marc Bulger	3,515	1998
8	**Michael Hawkins Jr.**	3,313	2026
9	Clint Trickett	3,179	2014
10	Garrett Greene	3,178	2023

Single game
Rank	Player	Yards	Year	Opponent
1	Geno Smith	687	2012	Baylor
2	Skyler Howard	555	2015	Arizona State (Cactus Bowl)
3	Michael Hawkins Jr.	541	2026	Cincinnati
4	Will Grier	517	2018	Oklahoma
5	Clint Trickett	507	2014	Maryland
6	Geno Smith	468	2011	LSU
7	Skyler Howard	439	2016	Youngstown State
8	Garrett Greene	438	2023	Houston
9	Geno Smith	433	2011	Clemson (Orange Bowl)
10	Geno Smith	431	2011	Connecticut

=== Touchdowns responsible for ===
"Touchdowns responsible for" is the NCAA's official term for combined passing and rushing touchdowns.

Career
Rank	Player	TDs	Years
1	Pat White	103	2005 2006 2007 2008
2	Geno Smith	102	2009 2010 2011 2012
3	Skyler Howard	76	2014 2015 2016
	Will Grier	76	2017 2018
5	Rasheed Marshall	69	2001 2002 2003 2004
6	Ira Errett Rodgers	66	1915 1916 1917 1918 1919
7	Garrett Greene	64	2020 2021 2022 2023 2024
8	Marc Bulger	61	1996 1997 1998
9	Major Harris	59	1987 1988 1989
10	Oliver Luck	54	1978 1979 1980 1981

Single season
Rank	Player	TDs	Year
1	Geno Smith	44	2012
2	Will Grier	40	2018
3	Skyler Howard	36	2016
4	Will Grier	35	2017
	**Michael Hawkins Jr.**	35	2026
6	Geno Smith	33	2011
7	Skyler Howard	32	2015
8	Marc Bulger	31	1998
	Pat White	31	2006
10	Ira Errett Rodgers	30	1919

Single game
Rank	Player	TDs	Year	Opponent
1	Geno Smith	8	2012	Baylor

== All-purpose yardage ==
All-purpose yardage is the sum of all yards credited to a player who is in possession of the ball. It includes rushing, receiving, and returns, but does not include passing.

West Virginia's 2018 media guide fully lists single-game all-purpose yardage records, but does not break them down by individual statistics.

Career
Rank	Player	Yards	Years
1	Tavon Austin	7,286	2009 2010 2011 2012
2	Noel Devine	5,761	2007 2008 2009 2010
3	Avon Cobourne	5,623	1999 2000 2001 2002
4	Steve Slaton	4,775	2005 2006 2007
5	Amos Zereoué	4,628	1996 1997 1998
6	Pat White	4,480	2005 2006 2007 2008
7	Arthur Owens	3,971	1969 1970 1971
8	Rahsaan Vanterpool	3,850	1993 1994 1995 1996
9	Wendell Smallwood	3,630	2013 2014 2015
10	Robert Alexander	3,575	1978 1979 1980

Single season
Rank	Player	Yards	Year
1	Tavon Austin	2,910	2012
2	Tavon Austin	2,574	2011
3	Steve Slaton	2,104	2006
4	Avon Cobourne	1,856	2002
5	Amos Zereoué	1,814	1998
6	Stedman Bailey	1,781	2012
7	Noel Devine	1,742	2009
8	Amos Zereoué	1,720	1997
9	Mario Alford	1,691	2014
10	Wendell Smallwood	1,679	2015

Single game
Rk	Player	Yards	Year	Opponent
1	Tavon Austin	572	2012	Oklahoma
2	Steve Slaton	345	2006	Pittsburgh
3	Garrett Ford Sr.	341	1965	Pittsburgh
4	Kay-Jay Harris	337	2004	East Carolina
5	Justin Crawford	331	2016	Oklahoma
6	Kerry Marbury	323	1971	Temple
7	Robert Gresham	312	1969	Richmond
8	Mario Alford	311	2013	Iowa State
9	Stedman Bailey	303	2012	Baylor
10	Tavon Austin	287	2011	LSU

== Defense ==
Note: Recent West Virginia football media guides have not generally listed a top 10 in the defensive categories. This has been confirmed true for both the 2014 and 2018 editions.

=== Interceptions ===
Career
Rank	Player	Ints	Years
1	Steve Newberry	20	1980 1981 1982 1983
2	Aaron Beasley	20	1992 1993 1994
3	Bob Snider	15	1951 1953 1956
4	Tom Pridemore	15	1975 1976 1977
5	Tim Agee	15	1980 1981 1982 1983

Single season
Rank	Player	Ints	Year
1	Aaron Beasley	10	1994
2	Rasul Douglas	8	2016
3	Bob Snider	7	1952
	Mike Slater	7	1969
	Tom Geishauser	7	1972
	Tim Agee	7	1983
	Preston Waters	7	1989

Single game
Rank	Player	Ints	Year	Opponent
1	Andrew King	4	1915	Marietta
	Francis Fairley	4	1925	Pittsburgh
	Mike Slater	4	1969	Kentucky

=== Tackles ===
Career
Rank	Player	Tackles	Years
1	Grant Wiley	492	2000 2001 2002 2003
2	Darryl Talley	484	1979 1980 1981 1982
3	Dennis Fowlkes	459	1979 1980 1981 1982
4	Steve Grant	445	1988 1989 1990 1991
5	Jeff Macerelli	432	1975 1976 1977 1978

Single season
Rank	Player	Tackles	Year
1	Steve Dunlap	190	1974
2	Chris Haering	185	1989
3	Ray Marshall	175	1975
4	Jeff Macerelli	172	1977
5	Charles Smith	170	1975

Single game
Rank	Player	Tackles	Year	Opponent
1	Steve Dunlap	28	1974	Boston College
2	Chris Haering	23	1989	Rutgers
3	Rick Sherrod	22	2001	Syracuse
	Grant Wiley	22	2001	Syracuse

=== Sacks ===
Career
Rank	Player	Sacks	Years
1	Canute Curtis	34.5	1993 1994 1995 1996
2	Julian Miller	27.5	2008 2009 2010 2011
3	Gary Stills	26.0	1996 1997 1998
4	Dante Stills	23.5	2018 2019 2020 2021 2022
5	Bruce Irvin	22.5	2010 2011
6	Renaldo Turnbull	22.0	1986 1987 1988 1989
7	Steve Hathaway	20.0	1980 1981 1982 1983
8	Darryl Talley	19.0	1979 1980 1981 1982

Single season
Rank	Player	Sacks	Year
1	Canute Curtis	16.5	1996
2	Steve Hathaway	15.0	1983
3	Bruce Irvin	14.0	2010
4	Renaldo Turnbull	12.0	1988
	Gary Stills	12.0	1997
6	Mike Fox	10.0	1989
	Canute Curtis	10.0	1995
	Gary Stills	10.0	1998
9	Julian Miller	9.0	2009
	Julian Miller	9.0	2010

Single game
Rank	Player	Sacks	Year	Opponent
1	Steve Hathaway	4.0	1983	Virginia Tech
	Gary Stills	4.0	1997	Marshall
	James Davis	4.0	2000	East Carolina
	Julian Miller	4.0	2011	Pittsburgh

== Kicking ==
=== Field goals made ===
Career
Rank	Player	FGs	Years
1	Paul Woodside	74	1981 1982 1983 1984
2	Josh Lambert	69	2013 2014 2015 2016
3	Pat McAfee	58	2005 2006 2007 2008
4	Jay Taylor	53	1996 1997 1998 1999
5	Charlie Baumann	52	1985 1986 1987 1988
6	Tyler Bitancurt	50	2009 2010 2011 2012
7	Casey Legg	40	2018 2019 2020 2021 2022
8	Evan Staley	39	2017 2018 2019 2020 2021
9	Michael Hayes	30	2023 2024
10	Frank Nester	25	1971 1972 1973
	Bill McKenzie	25	1974 1975 1976 1977

Single season
Rank	Player	FGs	Year
1	Josh Lambert	30	2014
2	Paul Woodside	28	1982
3	Paul Woodside	21	1983
	Josh Lambert	21	2015
5	Charlie Baumann	20	1988
6	Casey Legg	19	2021
7	Pat McAfee	17	2006
	Pat McAfee	17	2008
	Josh Lambert	17	2013
	Michael Hayes	17	2023

Single game
Rank	Player	FGs	Year	Opponent
1	Paul Woodside	4	1982	Syracuse
	Paul Woodside	4	1982	Maryland
	Pat McAfee	4	2006	Rutgers
	Tyler Bitancurt	4	2009	Liberty
	Tyler Bitancurt	4	2009	Pittsburgh
	Evan Staley	4	2018	Syracuse (Camping World Bowl)
	Casey Legg	4	2022	Virginia Tech

=== Field goal percentage ===
Career
Rank	Player	FG%	Years
1	Brenden Rauh	88.9%	1998 1999 2000 2001
2	Michael Hayes	85.7%	2023 2024
3	Kade Hensley	83.3%	2025
4	Casey Legg	81.6%	2018 2019 2020 2021 2022
5	Paul Woodside	79.6%	1981 1982 1983 1984
6	Mike Vanderjagt	75.0%	1991 1992
7	Josh Lambert	75.0%	2013 2014 2015 2016
8	Charlie Baumann	74.3%	1985 1986 1987 1988
9	Jay Taylor	73.6%	1996 1997 1998 1999
10	Evan Staley	73.6%	2017 2018 2019 2020 2021

Single season
Rank	Player	FG%	Year
1	Casey Legg	93.3%	2022
2	Charlie Baumann	92.9%	1987
	Michael Hayes	92.9%	2024
4	Paul Woodside	90.3%	1982
5	Jay Taylor	86.7%	1999
	Brenden Rauh	86.7%	2001
	Tyler Bitancurt	86.7%	2009
8	Pat McAfee	85.0%	2008
9	Paul Woodside	84.0%	1983
10	Jay Taylor	83.3%	1997
	Kade Hensley	83.3%	2025
