= List of West Virginia Mountaineers in the NFL draft =

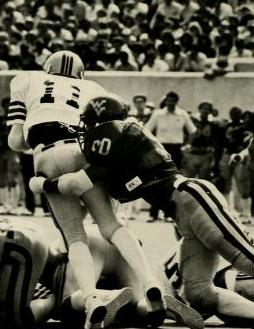
Darryl Talley was selected in the 2nd round (39th overall) by the Buffalo Bills in the 1983 NFL draft

The West Virginia Mountaineers football team, representing West Virginia University (WVU), has had 199 players selected in the National Football League (NFL) since the league began holding drafts in 1936. This includes nine players selected in the first round. The Philadelphia Eagles and Detroit Lions have drafted the most Mountaineers overall, 16 and 15, respectively. The Baltimore Ravens are the only current franchise to not have drafted a player from WVU. Fifteen Mountaineer draft choices have been selected to a Pro Bowl and eleven have won a league championship.

Each NFL franchise seeks to add new players through the annual NFL draft. The draft rules were last updated in 2009. The team with the worst record from the previous year picks first, the next-worst team second, and so on. Teams that did not make the playoffs are ordered by their regular-season record with any remaining ties broken by strength of schedule. Playoff participants are sequenced after non-playoff teams, based on their round of elimination (wild card, division, conference, and Super Bowl).

== Key ==
B	Back (Note: In American and Canadian football, a back is a player who is lined up behind the linemen, the players who line up closest to the line of scrimmage.)	K	Kicker	NT	Nose tackle
C	Center	LB	Linebacker	FB	Fullback
DB	Defensive back	P	Punter	RB	Running back
DE	Defensive end	QB	Quarterback	WR	Wide receiver
DT	Defensive tackle	RB	Running back	G	Guard
E	End	T	Offensive tackle	TE	Tight end

^{†}	Selected to an all-star game
^{‡}	Won a league championship
^{#}	Selected to an all-star game and won a league championship

== National Football League Draft ==
Year	Round	Pick	Overall	Player	Team (Note: This is the team that drafted the player, not their most recent team.)	Position	Notes
1936	1	6	6	Joe Stydahar^{#}	Chicago Bears	T	NFL All-Star (1938, 1939, 1940, 1941); NFL All-Pro (1937, 1938, 1939, 1940); NFL Champion (1940, 1941, 1946, 1951); NFL 1930s All-Decade Team; Pro Football Hall of Fame inductee
1937	7	1	61	Herb Barna	Philadelphia Eagles	G	—
1938	7	8	58	Kelly Moan	New York Giants	RB	—
1939	18	3	163	Alex Atty	Cleveland Rams	G	—
1940	13	4	114	Mike Gussie	Brooklyn Dodgers	G	—
1940	13	7	117	Harry Clarke^{#}	Chicago Bears	RB	NFL All-Star (1940, 1941); 1943 NFL All-Pro; NFL Champion (1940, 1941, 1943)
1941	19	1	171	John Shonk	Philadelphia Eagles	E	—
1943	17	1	151	Vic Peelish	Detroit Lions	G	—
1943	19	4	174	Quentin Barnette	Brooklyn Dodgers	RB	—
1944	22	4	212	Eddie Kulakowski	Philadelphia Eagles	T	—
1944	28	3	288	Dick McElwee	Detroit Lions	RB	—
1945	29	9	305	Leo Benjamin	Philadelphia Eagles	C	—
1946	17	3	153	Russ Lopez	Pittsburgh Steelers	C	—
1948	3	5	18	Tom Keane^{#}	Los Angeles Rams	DB	1953 NFL Pro Bowl selection 1953 NFL All-Pro selection 1951 NFL Champion
1948	11	10	95	Gene Corum	Chicago Cardinals	G	—
1948	13	9	114	Jim Walthall	Philadelphia Eagles	QB	—
1949	10	10	101	Roy Lester	Philadelphia Eagles	E	—
1949	16	3	154	Gene Remenar	Green Bay Packers	T	—
1949	16	10	161	Frank Reno	Philadelphia Eagles	E	—
1950	9	10	115	Pete Zinach	San Francisco 49ers	B	—
1950	11	11	142	Fred Stuvek	Los Angeles Rams	G	—
1950	13	2	159	Jack Morton	New York Bulldogs	B	—
1950	15	11	194	Dave Stephenson	Los Angeles Rams	C	—
1950	28	5	357	Ralph Shoaf	Washington Redskins	B	—
1951	19	5	224	Jack Bove	Philadelphia Eagles	T	—
1951	26	5	308	Frank Kazmierski	Detroit Lions	C	—
1952	15	10	179	Paul Bischoff	New York Giants	E	—
1953	13	6	151	Bob Orders	Green Bay Packers	C	—
1954	4	3	40	Tommy Allman	Green Bay Packers	B	—
1954	8	4	89	Ralph Starkey	New York Giants	T	—
1954	8	7	92	Bill Marker	Washington Redskins	E	—
1954	12	7	140	Ben Dunkerley	Washington Redskins	E	—
1954	21	9	250	Jerry Cooper	Los Angeles Rams	T	—
1954	24	5	282	Bill Jarrett	Chicago Bears	B	—
1954	24	9	286	Ed Brookman	Los Angeles Rams	T	—
1954	29	8	345	Jack Stone	Philadelphia Eagles	B	—
1955	5	8	57	Gene Lamone	Philadelphia Eagles	G	—
1955	11	7	128	Bill Hillen	New York Giants	E	—
1955	18	6	211	Clyde Sweeney	Los Angeles Rams	T	—
1955	23	3	268	Chuck Donaldson	Washington Redskins	C	—
1956	1	6	6	Joe Marconi^{#}	Los Angeles Rams	FB	1963 NFL Pro Bowl selection 1963 NFL Champion
1956	2	2	15	Bruce Bosley^{†}	San Francisco 49ers	T	NFL Pro Bowl (1960, 1965, 1966, 1967); NFL All-Pro (1959, 1961)
1956	3	5	30	Sam Huff^{#}	New York Giants	LB	NFL Pro Bowl (1958, 1959, 1960, 1961, 1964); NFL All-Pro (1957, 1958, 1959, 1960); 1956 NFL Champion; NFL 1950s All-Decade Team; 70 Greatest Washington Redskins honoree Pro Football Hall of Fame inductee
1956	3	11	36	Fred Wyant	Washington Redskins	QB	—
1956	4	12	49	Bobby Moss	Cleveland Browns	B	—
1956	11	12	133	Bill Underdonk	Cleveland Browns	T	—
1957	15	11	180	Tony Hosek	Chicago Bears	E	—
1957	21	9	250	Joe Kopinsky	Chicago Cardinals	E	—
1957	24	9	286	Ron Klim	Chicago Cardinals	C	—
1957	29	4	341	Bill Trozzo	Cleveland Browns	T	—
1958	1	7	7	Chuck Howley^{#}	Chicago Bears	G	NFL Pro Bowl (1965, 1966, 1967, 1968, 1969, 1971); NFL All-Pro (1966, 1967, 1968, 1969, 1970); Super Bowl V MVP; Super Bowl VI Champion; Dallas Cowboys Ring of Honor honoree
1958	2	7	20	Larry Krutko	Pittsburgh Steelers	B	—
1958	3	10	35	Joe Nicely	Baltimore Colts	G	—
1958	13	3	148	Mickey Trimarki	Philadelphia Eagles	QB	—
1958	19	4	221	Bill Chancey	Chicago Bears	E	—
1959	6	8	67	Dick Guesman	Detroit Lions	T	—
1959	13	6	150	Bill Lopasky	San Francisco 49ers	G	—
1959	21	4	244	Mel Reight	Washington Redskins	B	—
1959	22	3	255	Glenn Shamblin	Chicago Cardinals	B	—
1960	14	7	163	Bill Dumbauld	Cleveland Browns	T	—
1960	14	8	164	Ray Petersen	Philadelphia Eagles	B	—
1962	6	8	78	Bill Winter	San Francisco 49ers	T	—
1962	15	14	210	Roger Holdinsky	Green Bay Packers	B	—
1963	8	4	102	Tom Woodeshick^{†}	Philadelphia Eagles	RB	1968 NFL Pro Bowl selection
1963	13	13	181	Jim Moss	New York Giants	B	—
1963	19	5	257	Steve Berzansky	Baltimore Colts	B	—
1964	7	2	86	Pete Goimarac	Philadelphia Eagles	C	—
1964	10	8	134	Glenn Holton	Detroit Lions	RB	—
1965	15	2	198	Joe Pabian	San Francisco 49ers	T	—
1966	1	3	3	Dick Leftridge	Pittsburgh Steelers	RB	—
1966	6	6	86	Bob Dunlevy	Dallas Cowboys	WR	—
1966	15	10	225	Bill Sullivan	Detroit Lions	DE	—
1968	3	3	58	Garrett Ford	Denver Broncos	RB	—
1968	10	12	258	John Mallory	Philadelphia Eagles	DB	—
1968	14	12	366	Dan Williamson	Philadelphia Eagles	LB	—
1968	14	19	373	Ron Williams	Dallas Cowboys	DB	—
1970	9	1	209	Carl Crennel	Pittsburgh Steelers	LB	—
1971	3	5	57	Jim Braxton	Buffalo Bills	FB	—
1971	3	22	74	Dale Farley	Miami Dolphins	LB	—
1971	8	19	201	Bob Gresham	New Orleans Saints	RB	—
1972	16	15	405	Leon Jenkins	Detroit Lions	DB	—
1973	14	9	347	Ed Williams	Baltimore Colts	RB	—
1975	3	10	62	Danny Buggs	New York Giants	WR	—
1975	6	20	150	Charles Miller	Cleveland Browns	DB	—
1975	8	6	188	John Adams	Cleveland Browns	DT	—
1975	10	3	237	Marshall Mills	Atlanta Falcons	WR	—
1975	11	3	263	Jeff Merrow	Atlanta Falcons	DT	—
1975	16	13	403	Kerry Marbury	New England Patriots	RB	—
1976	3	30	90	Ron Lee	Baltimore Colts	RB	—
1976	4	23	115	Artie Owens	San Diego Chargers	WR	—
1976	8	16	225	Charles Braswell	Detroit Lions	DB	—
1976	14	5	380	Al Gluchoski	New York Jets	C	—
1976	17	3	462	Scott MacDonald	New Orleans Saints	TE	—
1976	17	25	484	Dick Lukowski	Minnesota Vikings	DT	—
1978	9	14	236	Tom Pridemore	Atlanta Falcons	DB	—
1978	11	7	285	Dave Riley	New Orleans Saints	RB	—
1981	5	22	133	Delbert Fowler	Houston Oilers	LB	—
1981	6	16	154	Fulton Walker	Miami Dolphins	DB	—
1981	10	21	269	Robert Alexander	Los Angeles Rams	RB	—
1982	2	17	44	Oliver Luck	Houston Oilers	QB	—
1983	2	11	39	Darryl Talley^{†}	Buffalo Bills	LB	NFL Pro Bowl (1990, 1991); NFL All-Pro (1990, 1993)
1983	11	23	302	Mark Raugh	Pittsburgh Steelers	TE	—
1984	3	3	59	Jeff Hostetler^{#}	New York Giants	QB	1994 NFL Pro Bowl selection NFL Super Bowl Champion (XXI, XXV)
1984	9	22	246	Rich Hollins	Detroit Lions	WR	—
1984	12	9	317	Steve Hathaway	Indianapolis Colts	DE	—
1985	4	20	104	Ron Wolfley^{†}	St. Louis Cardinals	FB	NFL Pro Bowl (1986, 1987, 1988, 1989); 1987 NFL All-Pro selection
1985	11	1	281	Willie Drewrey	Houston Oilers	WR	—
1985	12	25	333	Paul Woodside	Buffalo Bills	K	—
1986	1	7	7	Brian Jozwiak	Kansas City Chiefs	T	—
1986	7	16	182	Fred Smalls	San Diego Chargers	LB	—
1987	12	21	328	John Holifield	Cincinnati Bengals	RB	—
1988	4	2	84	David Grant	Cincinnati Bengals	DE	—
1989	6	18	157	Bo Orlando	Houston Oilers	DB	—
1989	6	27	166	Craig Taylor	Cincinnati Bengals	RB	—
1989	7	5	172	Undra Johnson	Atlanta Falcons	RB	—
1989	8	2	197	Chris Parker	Detroit Lions	DT	—
1989	8	14	209	A. B. Brown	New York Jets	RB	—
1989	8	22	217	Alvoid Mays^{‡}	Houston Oilers	DB	Super Bowl XXVI Champion
1989	9	14	237	Pat Marlatt	New York Jets	DT	—
1989	11	19	298	Brian Smider	Houston Oilers	T	—
1990	1	14	14	Renaldo Turnbull^{†}	New Orleans Saints	DE	1993 NFL Pro Bowl selection 1993 NFL All-Pro selection
1990	2	3	28	Reggie Rembert	New York Jets	WR	—
1990	2	3	51	Mike Fox^{‡}	New York Giants	DE	Super Bowl XXV Champion
1990	7	3	168	Basil Proctor	New York Jets	LB	—
1990	9	9	229	Jack Linn	Detroit Lions	T	—
1990	9	16	236	Lonnie Brockman	New Orleans Saints	T	—
1990	12	13	317	Major Harris	Los Angeles Raiders	QB	—
1992	7	26	194	Jim Gray	New England Patriots	DT	—
1992	10	1	253	Steve Grant	Indianapolis Colts	LB	—
1993	3	12	68	Mike Compton^{‡}	Detroit Lions	C	NFL Super Bowl Champion (XXXVI, XXXVIII)
1993	5	8	120	Adrian Murrell	New York Jets	RB	—
1994	3	11	76	Rich Braham	Arizona Cardinals	G	—
1994	6	8	169	Jay Kearney	Green Bay Packers	WR	—
1994	6	30	191	Darren Studstill	Dallas Cowboys	WR	—
1995	2	24	56	Todd Sauerbrun^{†}	Chicago Bears	P	NFL Pro Bowl (2001, 2002, 2003); NFL All-Pro (2001, 2002, 2003)
1996	3	2	63	Aaron Beasley	Jacksonville Jaguars	DB	—
1996	3	7	68	John Browning	Kansas City Chiefs	DE	—
1996	4	29	124	Kantroy Barber	New England Patriots	RB	—
1996	7	7	216	Lovett Purnell	New England Patriots	TE	—
1997	2	20	50	Mike Logan^{‡}	Jacksonville Jaguars	DB	Super Bowl XL Champion
1997	6	13	176	Canute Curtis	Cincinnati Bengals	LB	—
1998	7	14	203	Henry Slay	Atlanta Falcons	DT	—
1999	2	2	33	Charles Fisher	Cincinnati Bengals	DB	—
1999	2	21	52	John Thornton	Tennessee Titans	DT	—
1999	2	24	55	Solomon Page	Dallas Cowboys	G	—
1999	3	14	75	Gary Stills^{†}	Kansas City Chiefs	DE	2003 NFL Pro Bowl selection
1999	3	34	95	Amos Zereoue	Pittsburgh Steelers	RB	—
1999	4	26	121	Kevin Landolt	Jacksonville Jaguars	T	—
2000	1	27	27	Anthony Becht	New York Jets	TE	—
2000	2	16	47	Jerry Porter	Oakland Raiders	WR	—
2000	2	19	50	Barrett Green	Detroit Lions	LB	—
2000	6	2	168	Marc Bulger^{†}	New Orleans Saints	QB	NFL Pro Bowl (2003, 2006); St. Louis Rams MVP (2002, 2004)
2003	4	33	130	Lance Nimmo	Tampa Bay Buccaneers	T	—
2003	5	9	144	James Davis	Detroit Lions	LB	—
2004	7	18	219	Quincy Wilson	Atlanta Falcons	RB	—
2005	1	6	6	Adam Jones	Tennessee Titans	DB	—
2005	3	19	83	Chris Henry	Cincinnati Bengals	WR	—
2005	5	6	174	Rasheed Marshall	San Francisco 49ers	WR	—
2006	6	10	179	Dee McCann	Detroit Lions	DB	—
2008	3	26	89	Steve Slaton	Houston Texans	RB	—
2008	5	28	163	Owen Schmitt	Seattle Seahawks	FB	—
2008	6	28	194	Ryan Mundy	Pittsburgh Steelers	DB	—
2009	2	12	44	Pat White	Miami Dolphins	QB	—
2009	7	11	220	Ellis Lankster	Buffalo Bills	DB	—
2009	7	13	222	Pat McAfee^{†}	Indianapolis Colts	P	NFL Pro Bowl Pro Bowl (2014); 2× First-team All-Pro (2014, 2015)
2010	7	24	231	Selvish Capers	Washington Redskins	T	—
2011	4	1	98	Brandon Hogan	Carolina Panthers	DB	—
2011	5	3	134	Robert Sands	Cincinnati Bengals	DB	—
2011	6	30	195	J. T. Thomas	Chicago Bears	LB	—
2011	7	50	253	Chris Neild	Washington Redskins	DT	—
2012	1	15	15	Bruce Irvin	Seattle Seahawks	DE	—
2012	5	5	140	Najee Goode	Tampa Bay Buccaneers	LB	—
2012	6	4	174	Keith Tandy	Tampa Bay Buccaneers	DB	—
2013	1	8	8	Tavon Austin	St. Louis Rams	WR	—
2013	2	7	39	Geno Smith	New York Jets	QB	—
2013	3	30	92	Stedman Bailey	St. Louis Rams	WR	—
2014	3	5	69	Charles Sims	Tampa Bay Buccaneers	RB	—
2014	3	24	88	Will Clarke	Cincinnati Bengals	DE	—
2015	1	7	7	Kevin White	Chicago Bears	WR	—
2015	4	35	134	Mark Glowinski	Seattle Seahawks	G	—
2015	5	22	158	Shaquille Riddick	Arizona Cardinals	DE	—
2015	7	21	238	Mario Alford	Cincinnati Bengals	WR	—
2016	1	14	14	Karl Joseph	Oakland Raiders	DB	—
2016	3	14	77	Daryl Worley	Carolina Panthers	DB	—
2016	4	15	113	Nick Kwiatkoski	Chicago Bears	LB	—
2016	5	14	153	Wendell Smallwood	Philadelphia Eagles	RB	—
2016	5	22	159	K. J. Dillon	Houston Texans	DB	—
2017	3	35	99	Rasul Douglas	Philadelphia Eagles	DB	—
2017	5	22	166	Shelton Gibson	Philadelphia Eagles	WR	—
2018	4	19	119	Kyzir White	Los Angeles Chargers	DB	—
2019	3	36	100	Will Grier	Carolina Panthers	QB	—
2019	3	37	101	Yodny Cajuste	New England Patriots	T	—
2019	4	18	120	Gary Jennings Jr.	Seattle Seahawks	WR	—
2019	4	19	121	Trevon Wesco	New York Jets	TE	—
2019	6	15	188	David Long Jr.	Tennessee Titans	LB	—
2020	5	6	152	Kenny Robinson	Carolina Panthers	DB	—
2020	5	7	153	Colton McKivitz	San Francisco 49ers	T	—
2021	5	9	153	Tony Fields II	Cleveland Browns	LB	—
2023	6	36	213	Dante Stills	Arizona Cardinals	DT	–
2024	2	19	51	Zach Frazier	Pittsburgh Steelers	C	–
2025	3	25	89	Wyatt Milum	Jacksonville Jaguars	G	–

== Notable undrafted players ==
Note: No drafts held before 1936

Year	Player	Debut Team	Position	Notes
1965	Milt Clegg	Washington Redskins	LB	—
1973	Billy Joe Mantooth	Philadelphia Eagles	LB	—
1976	Mark Burke	Philadelphia Eagles	DB	—
1979	Dan Kendra	Los Angeles Rams	QB	—
1980	Jerry Holmes	New York Jets	S	—
1982	Mike Durrette	Los Angeles Raiders	DT	—
1985	Scott Barrows	Detroit Lions	G	—
1985	Gary Mullen	Detroit Lions	WR	—
1987	Jeff Lucas	Pittsburgh Steelers	OT	—
1989	Bob Kovach	Pittsburgh Steelers	G	—
1989	John Stroia	Pittsburgh Steelers	OT	—
1990	Scott Parker	Detroit Lions	G	—
1993	James Jett	Los Angeles Raiders	WR	—
1997	Bernard Russ	New England Patriots	LB	—
1998	Mike Vanderjagt	Indianapolis Colts	K	—
1999	Shawn Foreman	New York Jets	WR	—
2000	Jay Taylor	Miami Dolphins	K	—
2001	Chris Edmonds	Cincinnati Bengals	FB	—
2001	Khori Ivy	New England Patriots	WR	—
2001	Wes Ours	Indianapolis Colts	FB	—
2002	Antwan Lake	Detroit Lions	DT	—
2002	Corey McIntyre	Philadelphia Eagles	FB	—
2003	Antonio Brown	Buffalo Bills	WR	—
2003	Avon Cobourne	Detroit Lions	RB	—
2004	Lance Frazier	Baltimore Ravens	CB	—
2004	Grant Wiley	Minnesota Vikings	LB	—
2005	Kay-Jay Harris	Miami Dolphins	RB	
2006	Jahmile Addae	Tampa Bay Buccaneers	DB	—
2007	Dan Mozes	Minnesota Vikings	C	—
2008	Johnny Dingle	Kansas City Chiefs	DE	—
2008	Keilen Dykes	Kansas City Chiefs	WR	—
2009	Mortty Ivy	Carolina Panthers	LB	—
2011	Noel Devine	Philadelphia Eagles	RB	—
2011	Jock Sanders	Tampa Bay Buccaneers	LB	—
2012	Don Barclay	Green Bay Packers	T	—
2013	Terence Garvin	Pittsburgh Steelers	LB	—
2015	Quinton Spain	Tennessee Titans	G	—
2017	Skyler Howard	Seattle Seahawks	QB	—
2017	Adam Pankey	Green Bay Packers	OT	—
2017	Rushel Shell III	Pittsburgh Steelers	RB	—
2018	Justin Crawford	Atlanta Falcons	RB	—
2018	Ka'Raun White	Seattle Seahawks	WR	—
2019	David Sills	Buffalo Bills	WR	—
2019	Marcus Simms	Jacksonville Jaguars	WR	—
2020	George Campbell	New York Jets	WR	—
2023	Bryce Ford-Wheaton	New York Giants	WR	—
2026	Reid Carrico	Cleveland Browns	LB	—
2026	Michael Coats Jr.	Cleveland Browns	CB	—
