= Kerry Marbury =

American gridiron football player (1952–2019)

Kerry Marbury (March 21, 1952 – June 23, 2019) was a Canadian football running back in the Canadian Football League (CFL) who played for the Toronto Argonauts and Ottawa Rough Riders. He played college football for the West Virginia Mountaineers.

He was a high school football teammate and lifelong friend of Alabama head coach Nick Saban. After his playing days were over, he served as a professor of humanities, Race, Class and Gender at Fairmont State University.
