= 2012 Orange Bowl =

2012 Discover Orange Bowl
- BCS Bowl Game; 78th Orange Bowl
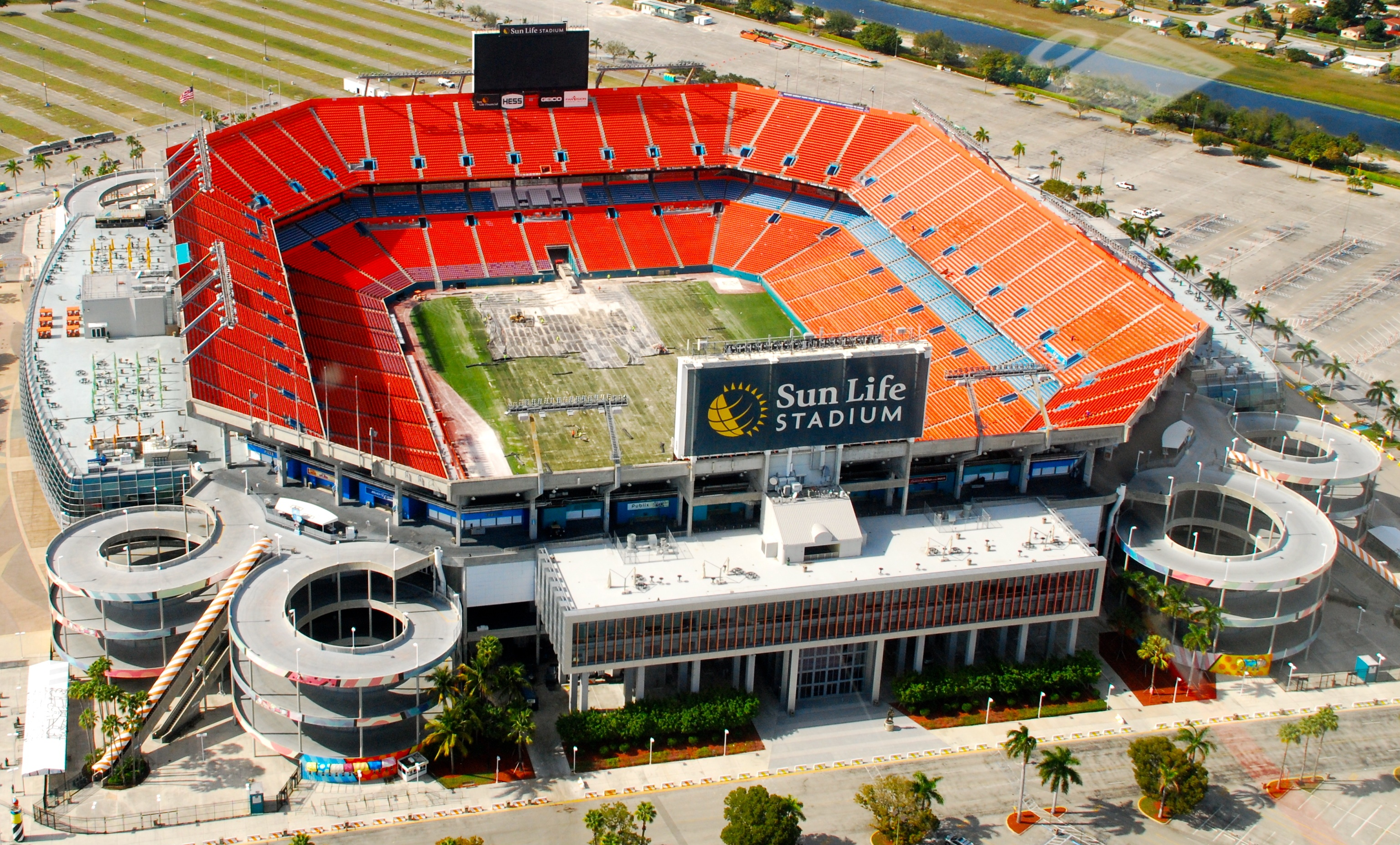
- Sun Life Stadium in Miami Gardens, Florida, hosted the Orange Bowl.
West Virginia Mountaineers	Clemson Tigers
(9–3)	(10–3)
Big East	ACC
70	33
Head coach: Dana Holgorsen	Head coach: Dabo Swinney
AP / Coaches / BCS; 23 / 22 / 23	AP / Coaches / BCS; 14 / 14 / 15
	1	2	3	4	Total
West Virginia	14	35	14	7	70
Clemson	17	3	6	7	33
- Date: January 4, 2012
- Season: 2011
- Stadium: Sun Life Stadium
- Location: Miami Gardens, Florida
- MVP: Geno Smith (QB, West Virginia)
- Favorite: Clemson by 3 (64)
- National anthem: Javier Colon
- Referee: David Witvoet (Big Ten Conference)
- Halftime show: Train, Metuchen High School Marching Band
- Attendance: 67,563
- Payout: US$17,000,000 per team

United States TV coverage
- Network: ESPN
- Announcers: Mike Tirico (Play-by-Play); Ron Jaworski and Jon Gruden (Analysts); Lisa Salters (Sidelines)
- Nielsen ratings: 4.5 rating

The 2012 Discover Orange Bowl was a postseason college football bowl game on Wednesday, January 4, 2012, at Sun Life Stadium, now known as Hard Rock Stadium, in Miami Gardens, Florida. The West Virginia Mountaineers defeated the Clemson Tigers by a score of 70–33. West Virginia tied or broke eight separate team and individual bowl game records, while the combined 69 points West Virginia and Clemson scored in the first half set another new record. The game was part of the 2011–2012 Bowl Championship Series of the 2011 NCAA Division I FBS football season and was the concluding game of the season for both teams.

== Teams ==
The two schools were meeting for the second time. Coming into the game, Clemson had a 1–0 record over WVU, with a 27–7 victory in the 1989 Gator Bowl. This was Clemson's fourth appearance in the Orange Bowl, while it marked the first time WVU had been invited. Both teams averaged at least 33 points and over 440 yards per game.

=== West Virginia ===
West Virginia finished the season in a three-way tie for the Big East Conference title, but earned the conference's BCS bid since it was the highest-ranked team in the final BCS rankings. The team scored 419 points (34.9 per game) this season, fourth highest average in school history. The Mountaineers scored 30 or more points in eight games, 40 or more points in four games and 50 or more points in two games during 2011. This year's team set a new school mark in the passing game (4,102 yards) with receiver Stedman Bailey accounting for 1,197 yards (a school record) and scoring 11 touchdowns.

=== Clemson ===
Clemson won its first ACC championship in twenty years and appeared in its first major bowl since the 1982 Orange Bowl, when they won the national championship. The Tigers were 21st in the nation in passing with 285 yards per game. The team was led by quarterback Tajh Boyd, who was 18th in total offense, and by wide receiver Sammy Watkins, who was fourth in the nation with 173 yards per game. Watkins was also rated top-25 in receptions per game and kickoff returns.

== Records ==
West Virginia and Clemson together set or tied nine separate bowl records at the Orange Bowl:

1. Team touchdowns: West Virginia's ten touchdowns tied the record.
2. Combined points in a half: The 69 points between West Virginia and Clemson at halftime set a new record.
3. Total points: West Virginia's 70 points broke the record set one week earlier by Baylor in the 2011 Alamo Bowl. This particular record would be tied by Army in the 2018 Armed Forces Bowl.
4. Points in a quarter: West Virginia's 35 points in the second quarter set a new record.
5. Points in a half: West Virginia's 49 points in the first half set a new record. The previous record was 45, held by Colorado at the 1999 Insight.com Bowl and Oklahoma State at the 1988 Holiday Bowl. This record stood until the 2018 Music City Bowl, when Auburn led Purdue 56–7 at halftime, going on to win 63–14.
6. Individual passing touchdowns: Geno Smith's six touchdowns tied Chuck Long's record in the 1984 Freedom Bowl.
7. Individual total touchdowns: Smith also rushed for a touchdown, giving him seven overall which tied another record.
8. Individual total points: Smith's seven touchdowns scored 42 points, also tying a record.
9. Individual receiving touchdowns: Tavon Austin's four touchdown receptions, becoming the fourth player to do so in a bowl game.

== Game summary ==
2012 Capital One Orange Bowl
No. 23 West Virginia Mountaineers vs. No. 14 Clemson Tigers

Quarter	1	2	3	4	Total
No. 23 Mountaineers	14	35	14	7	70
No. 14 Tigers	17	3	6	7	33

at Sun Life Stadium • Miami Gardens, Florida

- Date: Wednesday January 4, 2012
- Game time: 8:30 p.m. EST
- Game attendance: 67,563
- Referee: David Witvoet
- TV announcers (ESPN): Mike Tirico, Ron Jaworski, Jon Gruden, and Lisa Salters
- Box score

Game information
First quarter
- CLEM – Andre Ellington 68-yard run (Chandler Catanzaro kick), 9:33. Tigers 7–0. Drive: 6 plays, 96 yards, 1:39.
- WVU – Shawne Alston 4-yard run (Tyler Bitancurt kick), 6:54. Tied 7–7. Drive: 8 plays, 72 yards, 2:39.
- CLEM – Sammy Watkins 27-yard pass from Tahj Boyd (Chandler Catanzaro kick), 4:38. Tigers 14–7. Drive: 9 plays, 62 yards, 2:16.
- WVU – Tavon Austin 8-yard pass from Geno Smith (Tyler Bitancurt kick), 2:49. Tied 14–14. Drive: 6 plays, 57 yards, 1:49.
- CLEM – Chandler Catanzaro 42-yard field goal, 0:45. Tigers 17–14. Drive: 6 plays, 40 yards, 2:04.

Second quarter

- WVU – Tavon Austin 27-yard pass from Geno Smith (Tyler Bitancurt kick), 13:25. Mountaineers 21–17. Drive: 9 plays, 80 yards, 2:20.
- WVU – Darwin Cook 99-yard fumble return (Tyler Bitancurt kick), 10:28. Mountaineers 28–17.
- CLEM – Chandler Catanzaro 43-yard field goal, 4:49. Mountaineers 28–20. Drive: 8 plays, 56 yards, 1:36.
- WVU – Geno Smith 7-yard run (Tyler Bitancurt kick), 2:29. Mountaineers 35–20. Drive: 6 plays, 64 yards, 2:20.
- WVU – Tavon Austin 3-yard pass from Geno Smith (Tyler Bitancurt kick), 1:13. Mountaineers 42–20. Drive: 3 plays, 32 yards, 0:52.
- WVU – Shawn Alston 1-yard run (Tyler Bitancurt kick), 0:04. Mountaineers 49–20. Drive: 5 plays, 18 yards, 0:58.

Third quarter

- WVU – Stedman Bailey 6-yard pass from Geno Smith (Tyler Bitancurt kick), 12:35. Mountaineers 56–20. Drive: 7 plays, 73 yards, 2:25.
- WVU – Tavon Austin 37-yard pass from Geno Smith (Tyler Bitancurt kick), 9:18. Mountaineers 63–20. Drive: 5 plays, 74 yards, 2:25.
- CLEM – DeAndre Hopkins 28-yard pass from Tahj Boyd (pass failed), 1:37. Mountaineers 63–26. Drive: 5 plays, 41 yards, 1:39.

Fourth quarter

- WVU – Willie Milhouse 7-yard pass from Geno Smith (Tyler Bitancurt kick), 6:21. Mountaineers 70–26. Drive: 12 plays, 66 yards, 6:14.
- CLEM – Roderick McDowell 4-yard run (Chandler Catanzaro kick), 1:01. Mountaineers 70–33. Drive: 6 plays, 39 yards, 1:55.

Statistics	WVU	CLEM
First downs	31	24
Total yards	589	443
Rushing yards	182	193
Passing yards	407	250
Passing: comp–att–int	32–46–1	24–47–2
Turnovers	1	4

Team	Category	Player	Statistics
West Virginia	Passing	Geno Smith	32/43, 407 yards, 6 TD
West Virginia	Rushing	Shawne Alston	20 rushes, 77 yards, 2 TD
West Virginia	Receiving	Tavon Austin	12 receptions, 123 yards, 4 TD
Clemson	Passing	Tahj Boyd	24/46, 250 yards, 2 TD, 2 INT
Clemson	Rushing	Andre Ellington	10 rushes, 116 yards, TD
Clemson	Receiving	DeAndre Hopkins	10 receptions, 107 yards, TD

== Gallery ==
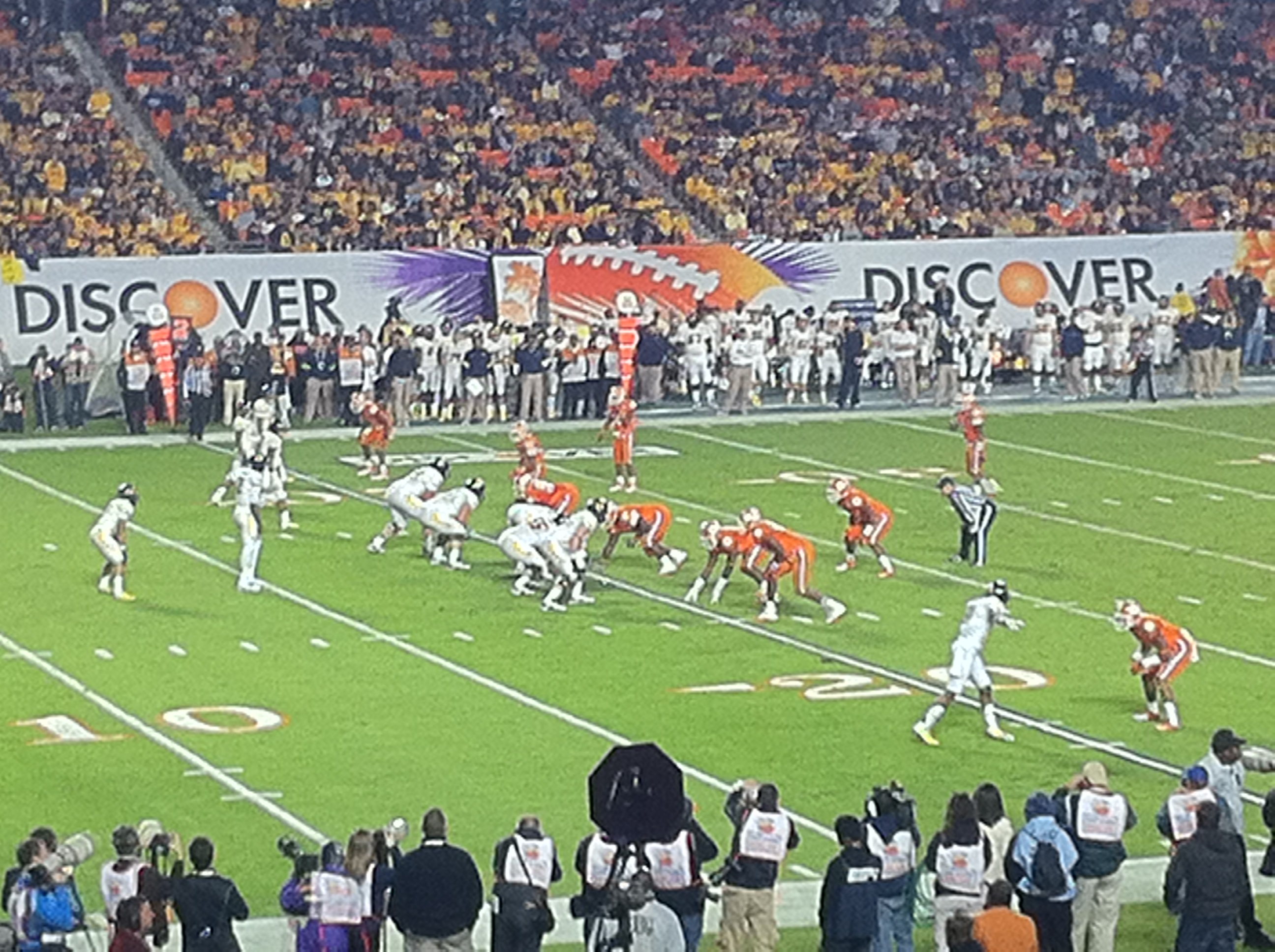
Geno Smith and the West Virginia offense lined up against Clemson's defense.

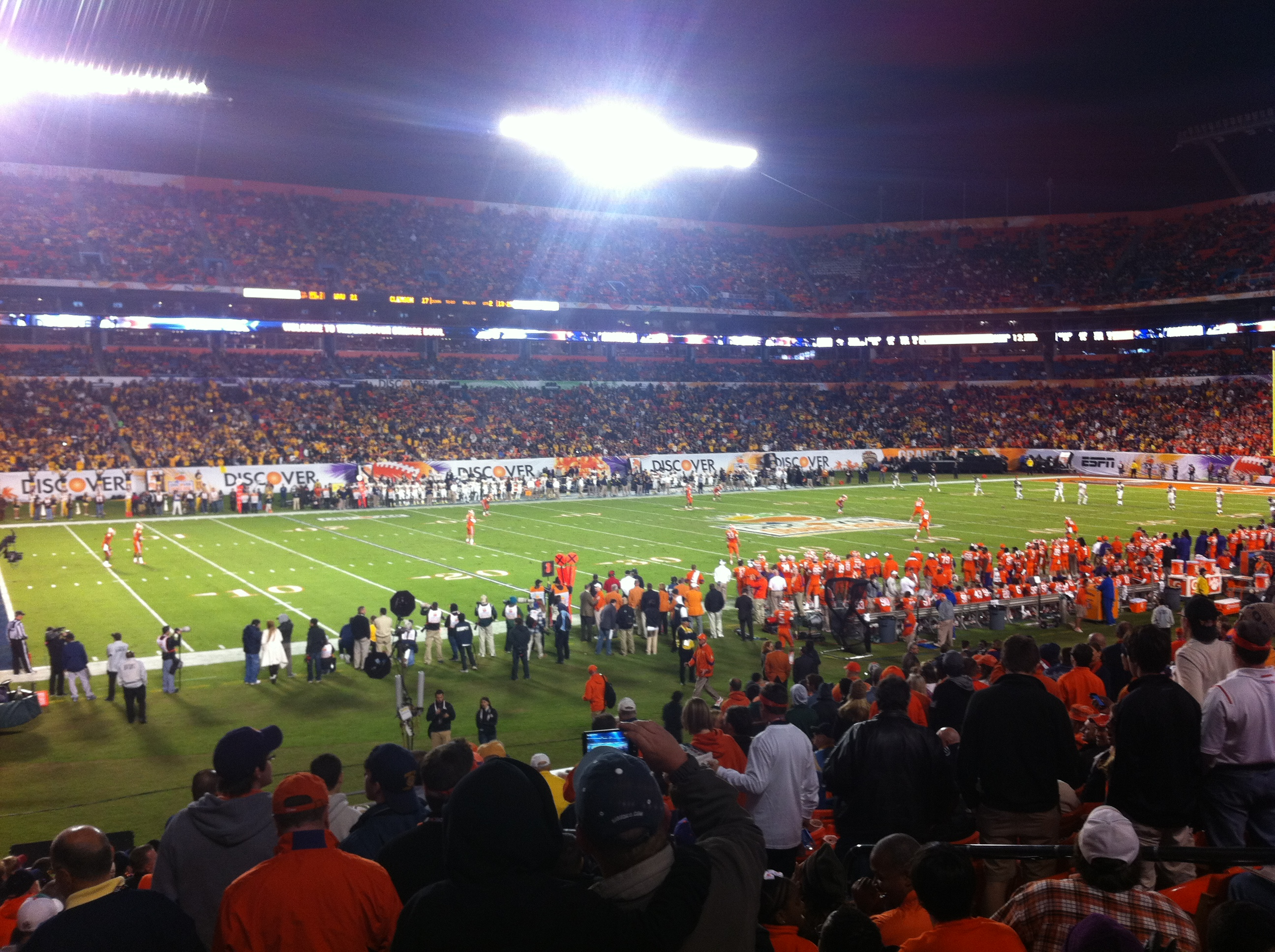
West Virginia lined up to kick off to Clemson.
