= David Saunders (American football player) =

American football player (born 1976)

No. 2
- Positions: Wide receiver, linebacker

Personal information
- Born: January 31, 1976 (age 50); Toledo, Ohio, U.S.
- Listed height: 6 ft 2 in (1.88 m)
- Listed weight: 210 lb (95 kg)

Career information
- High school: Palatine (Palatine, Illinois)
- College: West Virginia
- NFL draft: 1999: undrafted

Career history
- New Jersey Red Dogs/Gladiators (2000–2001); Tampa Bay Storm (2002–2005); Grand Rapids Rampage (2005); Columbus Destroyers (2006–2007); Tampa Bay Storm (2008); Arizona Rattlers (2008)

Awards and highlights
- ArenaBowl champion (2003); First-team All-Big East (1996); Second-team All-Big East (1998); First-team All-ECAC (1998); Tampa Bay Storm Team MVP (2002)

Career AFL statistics
- Receptions: 446
- Receiving yards: 4,999
- Avg.: 11.2
- Touchdowns: 115
- Tackles: 103
- Stats at ArenaFan.com

David Saunders (born January 31, 1976), is an American former professional football wide receiver and linebacker who played in the Arena Football League (AFL). He played collegiate football for West Virginia University.

In his career, Saunders played for the New Jersey Red Dogs, New Jersey Gladiators, Grand Rapids Rampage, Columbus Destroyers and Tampa Bay Storm.

== Early life ==
Saunders began playing football his freshman year. He was a first-team All-State pick in the Illinois big school division by every publication in the state at Palatine High School. He caught 51 passes for 768 yards as a senior & had 108 receptions for 1,807 yards with 28 touchdowns during his career. David also played defensive back and punter. He also played basketball and ran track.

== College career ==
In 1994, as a freshman at West Virginia University, Saunders redshirted and played on the scout team. In 1995, as a redshirt freshman, Saunders earned the starting role at flanker. He ended the season as the team's leading receiver with 38 catches for 682 yards and five touchdowns, setting a school-record for freshman receiving yards and touchdowns. He began his career against Purdue, where he had 130 yards from six receptions. He scored his first career touchdown against East Carolina on a 50-yard reception, finishing the game with five receptions for 99 yards. He also recorded 149 yards against Rutgers, 94 yards against Miami, and 80 yards against Pitt to end the season in the Backyard Brawl. In 1996 season, his sophomore season, Saunders finished the year as a First-team All-Big East selection. He led the conference with an average of 83 yards receiving and 6.1 receptions-per-game. He started every game of the season as a flanker, leading the team with 76 receptions for 1,043 yards and five touchdowns, becoming the first player in school history to gain over 1,000 yards receiving in a season. Against East Carolina, he recorded eight receptions for 105 yards, followed by 191 yards and one touchdown against Boston College, which ranks third on the school's receiving yards in a single game list. He gained 113 yards against Syracuse, followed by 178 yards against Rutgers and 130 yards against North Carolina in the Gator Bowl, which earned him MVP honors. In 1997, his junior year, Saunders did not play, but returned for his senior season. In 1998, he earned Second-team All-Big East and First-team All-ECAC honors. He also led the team with 77 receptions for 883 yards and eight touchdowns while starting all the games at a new position, split end. His 77 receptions is tied for the school record, set the previous year by Shawn Foreman, while his eight touchdowns rank third most ever in a season in school history. Saunders recorded five receptions for 101 yards and two touchdowns against Tulsa, and then tied a school-record of 12 receptions against Miami. He then had 110 yards and a game-winning touchdown reception with three minutes left in the 35–28 win over Syracuse. In the Insight.com Bowl against Missouri, Saunders ended his career with eights receptions for 95 yards and two touchdowns.

Saunders is considered one of the greatest receivers in West Virginia Mountaineers history. He currently has the record for most career receiving yards with 2,608 yards. He also has the record for most career receptions with 191.

== Professional career ==
=== New Jersey Red Dogs (2000) ===
After leaving West Virginia, Saunders was away from football for a year.

In 2000, Saunders moved into the Arena Football League and was signed by the New Jersey Red Dogs. He played in 12 games as a rookie, catching 60 passes for 727 yards and 20 touchdowns. On defense, Saunders had 24 tackles and two interceptions, two that he returned for touchdowns. His best performance, of the season, came in Week 14 against the Carolina Cobras, when he caught 10 receptions for three touchdowns and also added five tackles.

=== New Jersey Gladiators (2001) ===
In 2001, Saunders left the Red Dogs the next season, and was signed by the New Jersey Gladiators. While playing for the Gladiators, he spent most of the season as an offensive specialist. He ended the season with 55 catches for 760 yards and 18 touchdowns.

=== Tampa Bay Storm (2002–2005) ===
In 2002, Saunders was signed by the Tampa Bay Storm. That season, he was named the Team MVP while leading the team in touchdowns, was second on the team in receptions, receiving yards and scoring, and was tied for fifth on the team with tackles while only playing in nine games. Saunders led the Storm in receiving in their two playoff games with a total of 10 passes for 156 yards and four touchdowns. He ended the season with 53 receptions for 610 yards and 14 touchdowns. On defense Saunders finished with 18.5 tackles. In 2003, he returned to the Storm for a second season. In his second season with Tampa, he played in 11 games and recorded 38 receptions for 440 yards and 11 touchdowns after missing the first four games due to an injury. He finished as the Storm's fourth leading receiver. His best performance of the season came against the Indiana Firebirds, when he caught six passes for 60 yards and three touchdowns while also broke up a pass on defense. In 2004, Saunders again played in 11 games for the Storm. He finished the season with 41 receptions for 484 yards and nine touchdowns while recording 17 tackles on defense. Although he missed a month due to a shoulder injury, he was fourth on the team in receptions, yards, and touchdowns. In 2005, Saunders only played the first six games of the season. He finished the season with 29 receptions for 309 yards and five touchdowns. He also recorded 8.5 tackles and an interception on defense.

=== Grand Rapids Rampage (2005) ===
During the 2005 season, Saunders was traded to the Grand Rapids Rampage and played in five more games. He finished his time in Grand Rapids with 15 receptions for 161 yards and two touchdowns.

=== Columbus (2006–2007) ===
In 2006, Saunders joined the Columbus Destroyers. He became a prominent receiver for the Destroyers, catching a touchdown pass in 10 straight games that season. That season, he set career-highs with 837 receiving yards and 20 touchdowns. He was also played well on defense, with 24 tackles on the season. His best game receiving came against the Philadelphia Soul, when he recorded seven receptions for 100 yards and two touchdowns. In that game, he also recorded a solo tackle, an assisted tackle, and two recovered fumbles. In 2007, Saunders also had another solid season for the Destroyers. Playing in eleven games as a two-way starter (missing five weeks due to a broken bone in his back), he ended the season with 68 receptions for 550 yards for 18 touchdowns. He also had a 19-game touchdown streak going, until it was ended against the Kansas City Brigade. He was second on the team in receptions, yards, touchdowns, and scoring. With 11 tackles on defense, Saunders ranked 12th on his team. Against the Georgia Force, he led the Destroyers' receivers with seven receptions for 65 yards and a touchdown. The Destroyers lost in ArenaBowl XXI against the San Jose SaberCats on July 29, 55–33, with Saunders recording three receptions for 21 yards and a touchdown.

=== Return to Tampa Bay (2008) ===
After the ArenaBowl XXI loss with the Destroyers, Saunders returned to the Storm for the 2008 season.

In 2008, Saunders' first game of the season was the week five game against the Soul, in which he recorded two receptions for 13 yards and one touchdown, he also recorded one tackle. During week six against the Destroyers, he recorded six receptions for 90 yards and three touchdowns, and 1.5 tackles, one tackle for loss. In the week seven game against the Arizona Rattlers, he recorded three receptions for 26 yards. During the week eight game against the New York Dragons, he recorded one reception for a three-yard touchdown.

=== Arizona Rattlers (2008) ===
On April 22, 2008, Saunders, along with Khalid Naziruddin and Bryant Tisdale where released by the Storm while they traded for fullback / linebacker Phil Glover. On April 29, 2008, Saunders was signed by the Arizona Rattlers.

In his first career game with the Rattlers, a loss to the San Jose SaberCats, Saunders recorded four receptions for 47 yards and a touchdown. He finished the season with 16 receptions for 179 yards averaging 11.6 yards-per-reception, and six touchdowns. On May 20, 2008, he was released by the Rattlers.

=== Career statistics ===
Career Statistics			Receiving			
Year	Team	G	Rec	Yards	Y/R	TD
2000	New Jersey Red Dogs	12	56	686	12.3	18
2001	New Jersey Gladiators	10	55	760	13.8	18
2002	Tampa Bay Storm	11	52	595	11.4	14
2003	Tampa Bay Storm	14	38	440	11.6	11
2004	Tampa Bay Storm	12	41	484	11.8	9
2005	Tampa Bay Storm	6	29	309	10.7	5
2005	Grand Rapids Rampage	5	15	161	10.7	2
2006	Columbus Destroyers	13	76	835	11.0	19
2007	Columbus Destroyers	15	68	550	8.1	18
2008	Tampa Bay Storm	4	12	132	11.0	0
2008	Arizona Rattlers	6	4	47	11.6	1
Total		108	446	4,999	11.2	115

	Career Defensive Statistics											
Year	Team	G	Tack	Solo	Ast	Sack	FF	FR	Int	Yds	TD	Pass Def.
2000	New Jersey Red Dogs	12	19	13	6	0	0	0	3	56	2	1
2001	New Jersey Gladiators	10	8	2	6	0	0	0	0	0	0	0
2002	Tampa Bay Storm	11	13	2	11	0	0	0	0	0	0	3
2003	Tampa Bay Storm	14	13	8	5	0	1	1	0	0	0	3
2004	Tampa Bay Storm	12	14	6	8	0	1	0	0	0	0	0
2005	Tampa Bay Storm	6	3	0	3	0	0	0	0	0	0	0
2005	Grand Rapids Rampage	5	7	4	3	0	0	0	1	0	0	0
2006	Dallas Desperados	13	14	2	12	0	1	3	0	0	0	3
2007	Dallas Desperados	15	11	0	1	0	0	2	0	0	0	1
2008	Tampa Bay Storm	4	1	0	1	0	0	0	0	0	0	1
2008	Arizona Rattlers	6	0	0	1	0	0	0	0	0	0	0
Total		108	103	48	55	0	3	6	4	56	2	12

== See also ==
- List of Arena Football League and National Football League players
