= Robert Walker (American football) =

American football player (born 1972)

Profile
- Position: Running back

Personal information
- Born: June 26, 1972 (age 54); Huntington, West Virginia, U.S.
- Listed height: 5 ft 11 in (1.80 m)
- Listed weight: 200 lb (91 kg)

Career information
- College: West Virginia (1992–1995)
- NFL draft: 1996: undrafted

Career history
- 1996-1997: New York Giants
- Stats at Pro Football Reference

Robert Walker (born June 26, 1972) is an American former professional football player who was a running back for the New York Giants of the National Football League (NFL). He played college football for the West Virginia Mountaineers. Walker is most remembered for his game-winning run against Miami in 1993.

== Collegiate career ==
Walker came to West Virginia University in 1992 as a freshman. Walker sat as third-string running back most of that season, behind star Adrian Murrell and backup Jon Jones.

His best season came in 1993, his sophomore year. With Murrell graduated and moved on to the pros, Walker assumed the starting role. Walker assumed the role better than anyone expected, as the Mountaineers went undefeated for the second time in school history. Their streak was almost broken on the second to last game of the season, against #4 Miami. The Hurricanes had the lead, 14–10, late in the fourth quarter. In front of a school-record 70,222 fans at home, Robert Walker scored on a run to the sideline to win the game for the Mountaineers and preserve the undefeated season. West Virginia did not make it to the national championship, instead the Sugar Bowl against Florida. The Mountaineers lost to the Gators, 41–7. Walker rushed for 1,250 yards and 11 touchdowns on the season, with a 5.8 average yardage per carry total.

The Mountaineers went 7–6 in Walker's junior season of 1994, with Walker's statistics slowly declining. He rushed for 749 yards, but only one touchdown on the season.

In Walker's final season as a Mountaineer, 1995, his totals began to decrease even more. He did have four touchdowns on the season, but only 508 yards on the year.

He was on the New York Giants practise squad in 1996 and was signed as an emergency free agent late in the season to cover injuries to the first string running backs. He played in one NFL game, but had no carries.
