= 2019 West Virginia Mountaineers football team =

American college football season

2019 West Virginia Mountaineers football
- Conference: Big 12 Conference
- Record: 5–7 (3–6 Big 12)
- Head coach: Neal Brown (1st season)
- Offensive coordinator: Matt Moore (1st season)
- Co-offensive coordinator: Chad Scott (1st season)
- Offensive scheme: Spread
- Defensive coordinator: Vic Koenning (1st season)
- Base defense: 3–3–5
- Home stadium: Mountaineer Field at Milan Puskar Stadium

Uniform
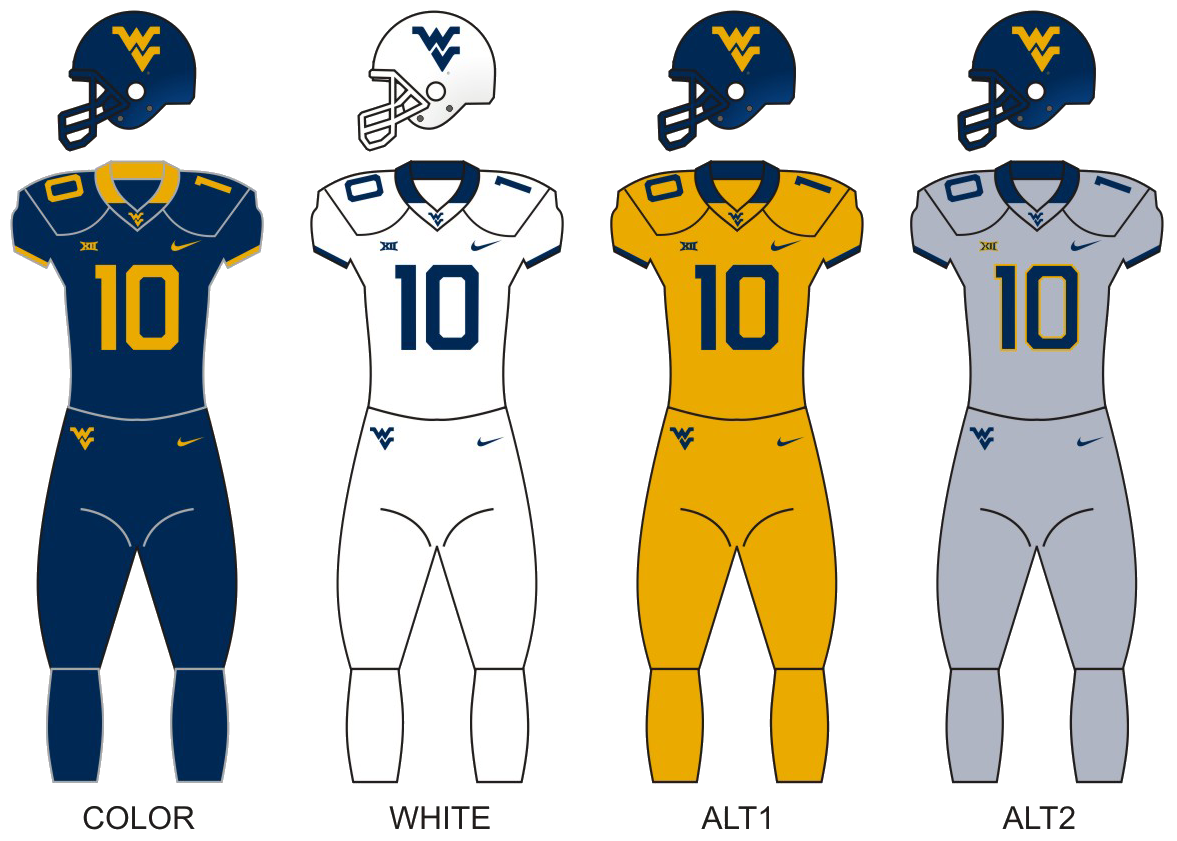

2019 Big 12 Conference football standings
	Conf.			Overall
Team	W		L	W		L
No. 7 Oklahoma y$^	8	–	1	12	–	2
No. 13 Baylor y	8	–	1	11	–	3
No. 25 Texas	5	–	4	8	–	5
Oklahoma State	5	–	4	8	–	5
Kansas State	5	–	4	8	–	5
Iowa State	5	–	4	7	–	6
West Virginia	3	–	6	5	–	7
TCU	3	–	6	5	–	7
Texas Tech	2	–	7	4	–	8
Kansas	1	–	8	3	–	9
Championship: Oklahoma 30, Baylor 23 ^{OT}
^ – College Football Playoff participant; $ – Conference champion; y – Championship game participant; Rankings from AP Poll

The 2019 West Virginia Mountaineers football team represented West Virginia University during the 2019 NCAA Division I FBS football season. The Mountaineers played their home games at the Mountaineer Field at Milan Puskar Stadium, in Morgantown, West Virginia, and competed in the Big 12 Conference. They were led by first-year head coach Neal Brown, who previously coached at Troy University. They finished the season 5–7, 3–6 in Big 12 play to finish in a tie for seventh place.

== Preseason ==
=== Big 12 media poll ===
The 2019 Big 12 media days were held July 15–16, 2019 in Frisco, Texas. In the Big 12 preseason media poll, West Virginia was predicted to finish in eighth in the standings.

== Schedule ==
Date	Time	Opponent	Site	TV	Result	Attendance
August 31	2:00 p.m.	No. 2 (FCS) James Madison*	Milan Puskar Stadium; Morgantown, WV	AT&TSN Pitt	W 20–13	61,891
September 7	12:00 p.m.	at Missouri*	Faurot Field; Columbia, MO	ESPN2	L 7–38	51,215
September 14	12:00 p.m.	NC State*	Milan Puskar Stadium; Morgantown, WV (Gold Rush)	FS1	W 44–27	57,052
September 21	4:30 p.m.	at Kansas	David Booth Kansas Memorial Stadium; Lawrence, KS	ESPN+	W 29–24	35,816
October 5	3:30 p.m.	No. 11 Texas^{†}	Milan Puskar Stadium; Morgantown, WV (Stripe the Stadium)	ABC	L 31–42	62,069
October 12	4:00 p.m.	Iowa State	Milan Puskar Stadium; Morgantown, WV	ESPN	L 14–38	51,836
October 19	12:00 p.m.	at No. 5 Oklahoma	Gaylord Family Oklahoma Memorial Stadium; Norman, OK	FOX	L 14–52	82,620
October 31	8:00 p.m.	at No. 12 Baylor	McLane Stadium; Waco, TX	ESPN	L 14–17	46,379
November 9	12:00 p.m.	Texas Tech	Milan Puskar Stadium; Morgantown, WV (True Blue)	ESPN2	L 17–38	56,573
November 16	2:30 p.m.	at No. 24 Kansas State	Bill Snyder Family Stadium; Manhattan, KS	ESPN	W 24–20	46,332
November 23	12:00 p.m.	No. 21 Oklahoma State	Milan Puskar Stadium; Morgantown, WV	ESPN2	L 13–20	46,022
November 29	4:15 p.m.	at TCU	Amon G. Carter Stadium; Fort Worth, TX	ESPN	W 20–17	40,126
*Non-conference game; ^{†}Homecoming; Rankings from AP Poll and CFP Rankings after November 5 released prior to game; All times are in Eastern time

== Personnel ==
=== Coaching staff ===
- Head coach

Neal Brown

- Assistant coaches

Jahmile Addae– Defensive Backs

Xavier Dye – Wide Receivers

Vic Koenning – Defensive Coordinator

Jordan Lesley – Defensive Line

Matt Moore – Co-Offensive Coordinator, Offensive Line

Al Pogue – Outside Linebackers

Sean Reagan – Quarterbacks

Chad Scott – Co-Offensive Coordinator, Running Backs

Blake Seiler – Inside Linebackers

Travis Trickett – Tight Ends, Inside Receivers

== Game summaries ==
=== James Madison ===
	1	2	3	4	Total
No. 2 (FCS) Dukes	7	0	3	3	13
Mountaineers	0	3	7	10	20

=== At Missouri ===
	1	2	3	4	Total
Mountaineers	0	0	0	7	7
Tigers	10	21	0	7	38

=== NC State ===
	1	2	3	4	Total
Wolfpack	7	14	6	0	27
Mountaineers	14	7	10	13	44

=== At Kansas ===
	1	2	3	4	Total
Mountaineers	7	3	10	9	29
Jayhawks	0	7	10	7	24

West Virginia was expected to take advantage of observing the Jayhawks offensive performance the prior week where Kansas had beaten Boston College. When the game rolled around, the Jayhawk offense made two specific mistakes that impacted the game: A lost fumble and a fourth quarter interception. Kansas averaged 7.4 yards per play on offense. It also appeared that KU kicker Liam Jones faked an injury after a field goal to make way for Jacob Borcila to "replace" him at the next kickoff to execute an onside kick—which they recovered but then lost due to a penalty. West Virginia won the game 29-24.

=== Texas ===
	1	2	3	4	Total
No. 11 Longhorns	7	14	0	21	42
Mountaineers	7	7	3	14	31

=== Iowa State ===
	1	2	3	4	Total
Cyclones	0	14	7	17	38
Mountaineers	7	7	0	0	14

=== At Oklahoma ===
	1	2	3	4	Total
Mountaineers	0	14	0	0	14
No. 5 Sooners	14	14	21	3	52

=== At Baylor ===
	1	2	3	4	Total
Mountaineers	0	0	14	0	14
No. 12 Bears	7	0	7	3	17

=== Texas Tech ===
	1	2	3	4	Total
Red Raiders	21	14	0	3	38
Mountaineers	3	7	0	7	17

=== At Kansas State ===
	1	2	3	4	Total
Mountaineers	14	0	0	10	24
No. 24 Wildcats	10	3	7	0	20

West Virginia's Jarret Doege started at quarterback and threw for 234 yards and three touchdowns. This was the first start at West Virginia for Doege who transferred from Bowling Green, as Austin Kendall had been the starting quarterback all season for the Mountaineers. Doege's biggest throw was a 50-yard touchdown pass on third-and-22 in the fourth quarter to take the lead.

Kansas State started strong, holding West Virginia to "three-and-out" and then Skylar Thompson threw a 68-yard touchdown pass on their first play from scrimmage. Thompson ended up 24 of 39 for 299 yards passing with a touchdown but also gave up two interceptions. On the ground, the Wildcats ran the ball 32 times but averaged only 3.2 yards per attempt.

West Virginia cornerback Hakeem Bailey intercepted Skylar Thompson’s pass toward the end zone in the closing seconds of the game. The Mountaineers left Manhattan with a 24-20 upset of the Wildcats.

=== Oklahoma State ===
	1	2	3	4	Total
No. 21 Cowboys	7	0	3	10	20
Mountaineers	0	10	3	0	13

=== At TCU ===
	1	2	3	4	Total
Mountaineers	7	3	3	7	20
Horned Frogs	7	3	7	0	17

== Players drafted into the NFL ==
Round	Pick	Player	Position	NFL Club
5	152	Kenny Robinson	S	Carolina Panthers
5	153	Colton McKivitz	OT	San Francisco 49ers
