= Kay-Jay Harris =

American football player (born 1979)

No. 33, 36
- Position: Running back

Personal information
- Born: March 27, 1979 (age 47); Tampa, Florida, U.S.
- Listed height: 6 ft 0 in (1.83 m)
- Listed weight: 240 lb (109 kg)

Career information
- High school: Tampa Bay Technical (Tampa)
- College: West Virginia
- NFL draft: 2005: undrafted

Career history
- Miami Dolphins (2005–2006)*; St. Louis Rams (2006); New York Giants (2007–2008)
- * Offseason or practice squad member only

Awards and highlights
- Super Bowl champion (XLII)
- Stats at Pro Football Reference

Kevin Jermaine "Kay-Jay" Harris (born March 27, 1979) is an American former professional football player who was a running back in the National Football League (NFL). He played college football for the West Virginia Mountaineers and was signed by the Miami Dolphins as an undrafted free agent in 2005.

Harris was a member of the St. Louis Rams and New York Giants.

== Early life ==
Harris played football, baseball, basketball, and track at Tampa Bay Technical High School in Tampa, Florida. He was drafted by the Texas Rangers for baseball and played four years of Class A ball before concentrating on football.

== College career ==
Harris attended Garden City Community College in Garden City, Kansas before transferring to West Virginia for his final two years. In two years with the Mountaineers, Harris started six of 23 games played, rushing for 1,483 yards and 14 touchdowns on 256 attempts, and added 25 receptions for 292 yards and three touchdowns. He also earned second-team all-Big East honors as a senior, rushing for 959 yards and 10 touchdowns on 165 carries, adding 20 receptions for 181 yards and three touchdowns.

On September 4, 2004, he set a West Virginia and Big East Conference record for rushing yards in a single game. He ran for 337 yards and four touchdowns on 25 carries against East Carolina despite not starting the game. West Virginia went on to win by a score of 56–23.

== Professional career ==
=== Miami Dolphins ===
Harris went undrafted in the 2005 NFL draft and was later signed with the Miami Dolphins. He spent the 2005 season on the team's practice squad.

=== St. Louis Rams ===
Harris was signed by the St. Louis Rams in 2006, where he backed up Steven Jackson and Stephen Davis.

In the 2007 preseason, Harris had three carries for 25 yards against the Minnesota Vikings. However, he was waived prior to the regular season.

=== New York Giants ===
Harris was signed to the practice squad of the New York Giants during the 2007 season, where he remained during the team's Super Bowl XLII victory over the New England Patriots. He re-signed with the team in the 2008 offseason. However, Harris suffered an ankle injury during a preseason game against the Cleveland Browns on August 18 and was carted off the field. He was waived/injured two days later.
