= Gary Jennings Jr. =

American football player (born 1997)

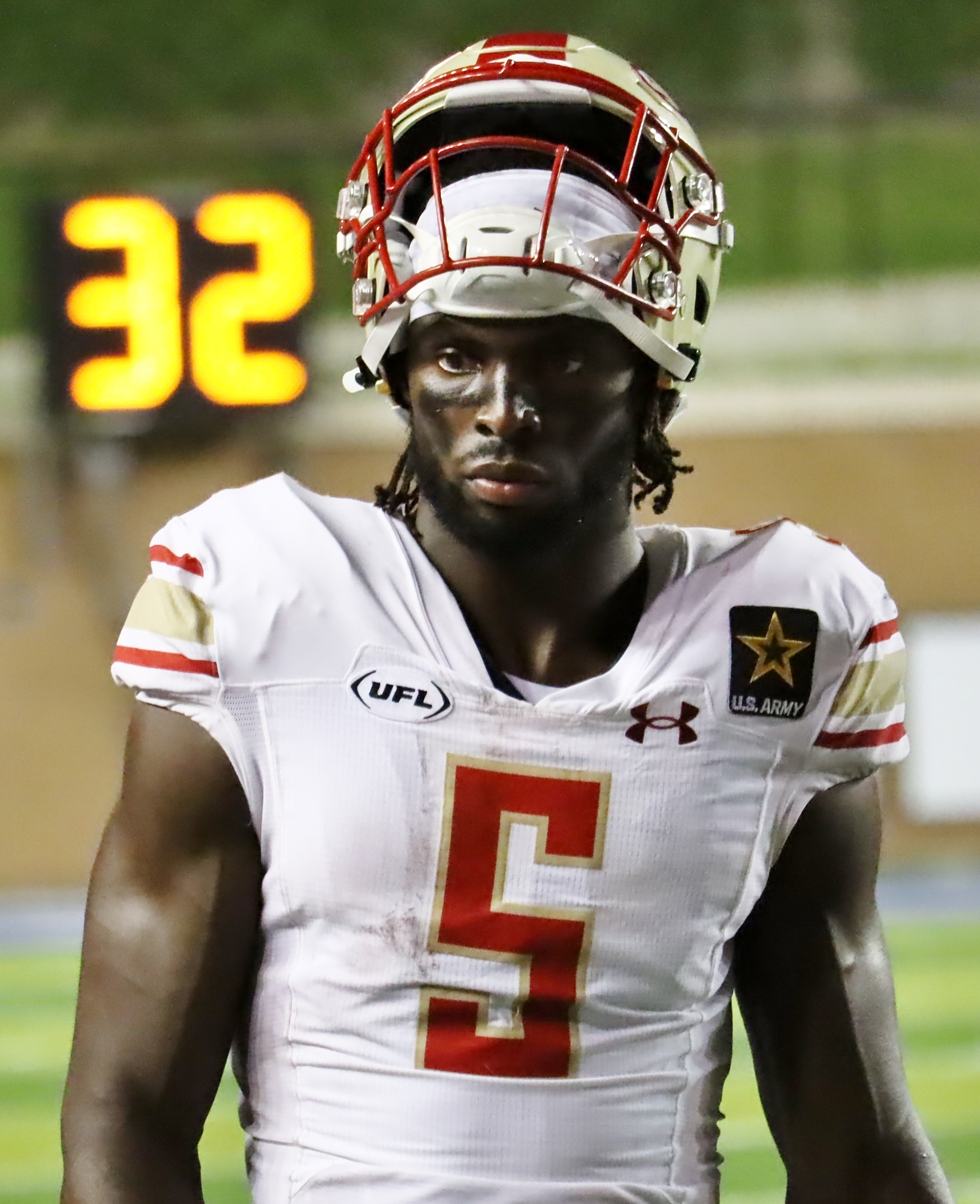
- Jennings with the Birmingham Stallions in 2024

Profile
- Position: Wide receiver

Personal information
- Born: March 7, 1997 (age 29); Stafford, Virginia, U.S.
- Listed height: 6 ft 1 in (1.85 m)
- Listed weight: 219 lb (99 kg)

Career information
- High school: Colonial Forge (Stafford)
- College: West Virginia (2015–2018)
- NFL draft: 2019: 4th round, 120th overall pick

Career history
- Seattle Seahawks (2019); Miami Dolphins (2019); Baltimore Ravens (2020)*; Buffalo Bills (2020)*; Indianapolis Colts (2021)*; Las Vegas Raiders (2021)*; Kansas City Chiefs (2022)*; St. Louis Battlehawks (2023); Carolina Panthers (2023)*; Birmingham Stallions (2024); St. Louis Battlehawks (2025); Los Angeles Chargers (2026)
- * Offseason or practice squad member only

Awards and highlights
- UFL champion (2024); All-UFL Team (2026); Second-team All-Big 12 (2017)
- Stats at Pro Football Reference

Gary Jennings Jr. (born March 7, 1997) is an American professional football wide receiver. He played college football at West Virginia.

== Early life ==
Gary attended Colonial Forge High School in Stafford, Virginia. He played quarterback, wide receiver and safety in high school. He committed to West Virginia University to play college football.

== College career ==
Jennings played at West Virginia from 2015 to 2018. During his career, he played in 50 games with 22 starts and had 168 receptions for 2,294 yards and 17 touchdowns.

== Professional career ==
Pre-draft measurables
Height	Weight	Arm length	Hand span	Wingspan	40-yard dash	10-yard split	20-yard split	20-yard shuttle	Three-cone drill	Vertical jump	Broad jump	Bench press
6 ft 1 in (1.85 m)	214 lb (97 kg)	32 1/2 in (0.83 m)	9 5/8 in (0.24 m)	6 ft 6 1/8 in (1.98 m)	4.42 s	1.55 s	2.67 s	4.15 s	7.32 s	37 in (0.94 m)	10 ft 7 in (3.23 m)	20 reps
All values from NFL Combine

=== Seattle Seahawks ===
Jennings was selected by the Seattle Seahawks in the fourth round (120th overall) of the 2019 NFL draft. He was waived on November 5, 2019, without appearing in a game.

=== Miami Dolphins ===
On November 6, 2019, Jennings was claimed off waivers by the Miami Dolphins. He was placed on injured reserve on November 20.

On September 5, 2020, Jennings was waived by the Dolphins.

=== Baltimore Ravens ===
Jennings was signed to the practice squad of the Baltimore Ravens on December 16, 2020, and released on December 22.

=== Buffalo Bills ===
On December 30, 2020, Jennings was signed to the Buffalo Bills' practice squad. He was released on January 4, 2021.

=== Indianapolis Colts ===
Jennings signed a reserve/future contract with the Indianapolis Colts on January 6, 2021. He was waived/injured by the team on August 8, and placed on injured reserve. On August 12, Jennings was waived from injured reserve with an injury settlement.

=== Las Vegas Raiders ===
On November 11, 2021, Jennings was signed to the Las Vegas Raiders' practice squad, but was released four days later.

=== Kansas City Chiefs ===
On January 11, 2022, Jennings signed a reserve/future contract with the Kansas City Chiefs. He was waived by the Chiefs on May 5, but was re–signed five days later. Jennings was waived by Kansas City on August 15. He was reverted to the Chiefs' injured reserve list a day later. Jennings was released by the team once more on August 24.

=== St. Louis BattleHawks (first stint) ===
Jennings was selected by the St. Louis BattleHawks of the XFL in the eighth round of the Open Phase of the 2023 XFL draft. Jennings finished the 2023 season with 11 catches for 149 yards and three touchdowns. He was released from his contract on May 15, 2023.

=== Carolina Panthers ===
On May 16, 2023, Jennings signed with the Carolina Panthers. He was released by the Panthers on August 26.

=== Birmingham Stallions ===
On December 6, 2023, Jennings signed with the Birmingham Stallions of the United States Football League (USFL). He re-signed with the team on August 27, 2024. Jennings was released on January 22, 2025.

=== St. Louis Battlehawks (second stint) ===
On March 6, 2025, Jennings signed with the St. Louis Battlehawks of the United Football League (UFL), where he played in 2023. He re-signed with the team on March 11, 2026.

=== Los Angeles Chargers ===
On August 23, 2026, Jennings signed with the Los Angeles Chargers. Jennings was waived by Los Angeles as a part of final roster cuts on August 30; he was re-signed to the team's practice squad the following day. He was promoted to the active roster on September 15. On September 22, Jennings was waived and re-signed to the practice squad two days later. On November 11, Jennings was released.
