= Justin Crawford (American football) =

American football player (born 1995)

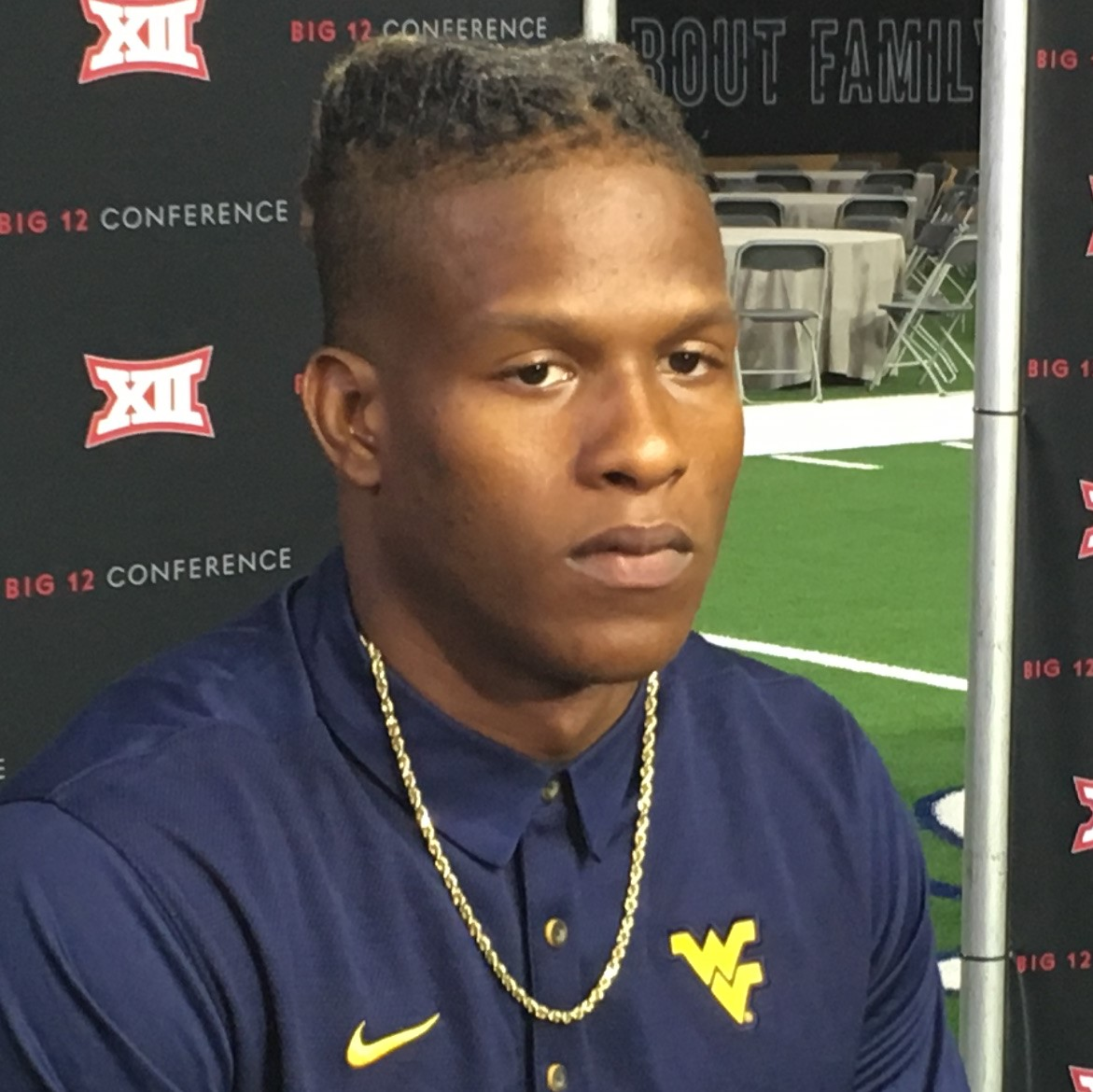
- Crawford at 2017 Big 12 Media Days

Profile
- Position: Running back

Personal information
- Born: February 19, 1995 (age 31); Columbus, Georgia, U.S.
- Listed height: 5 ft 11 in (1.80 m)
- Listed weight: 200 lb (91 kg)

Career information
- High school: Hardaway (Columbus, Georgia)
- College: West Virginia
- NFL draft: 2018: undrafted

Career history
- Atlanta Falcons (2018)*; Atlanta Legends (2019)*
- * Offseason or practice squad member only

Awards and highlights
- Second-team All-Big 12 (2017); Big 12 Offensive Newcomer of the Year (2016)

Justin Kenyuno Crawford (born February 19, 1995) is an American former football running back. He played college football at West Virginia.

Crawford graduated Hardaway High School in Columbus, Georgia. He first attended Northwest Mississippi Community College before transferring to West Virginia. In two seasons at WVU, Crawford ran for 1,184 yards (2016) and 1,061 yards (2017). He skipped the team's bowl game to avoid injury and prepare for the 2018 NFL draft.

== Professional career ==
Crawford signed with the Atlanta Falcons as an undrafted free agent on May 1, 2018. He was waived on September 1, 2018. He had signed with the Atlanta Legends in October 2018, but was waived after his arrest.

== Personal life ==
Crawford was arrested on October 13, 2018, for incest, sodomy, and enticing a child for indecent purpose after his wife found him standing over a minor in their home, naked with an erection. He later admitted to forcing the 12 year old relative to perform oral sex on him and claimed that having intercourse was the child's idea. On September 17, 2019, Crawford was sentenced to twelve years in prison and eight years of probation after pleading guilty to the crimes.
