= Stedman Bailey =

American football player (born 1990)

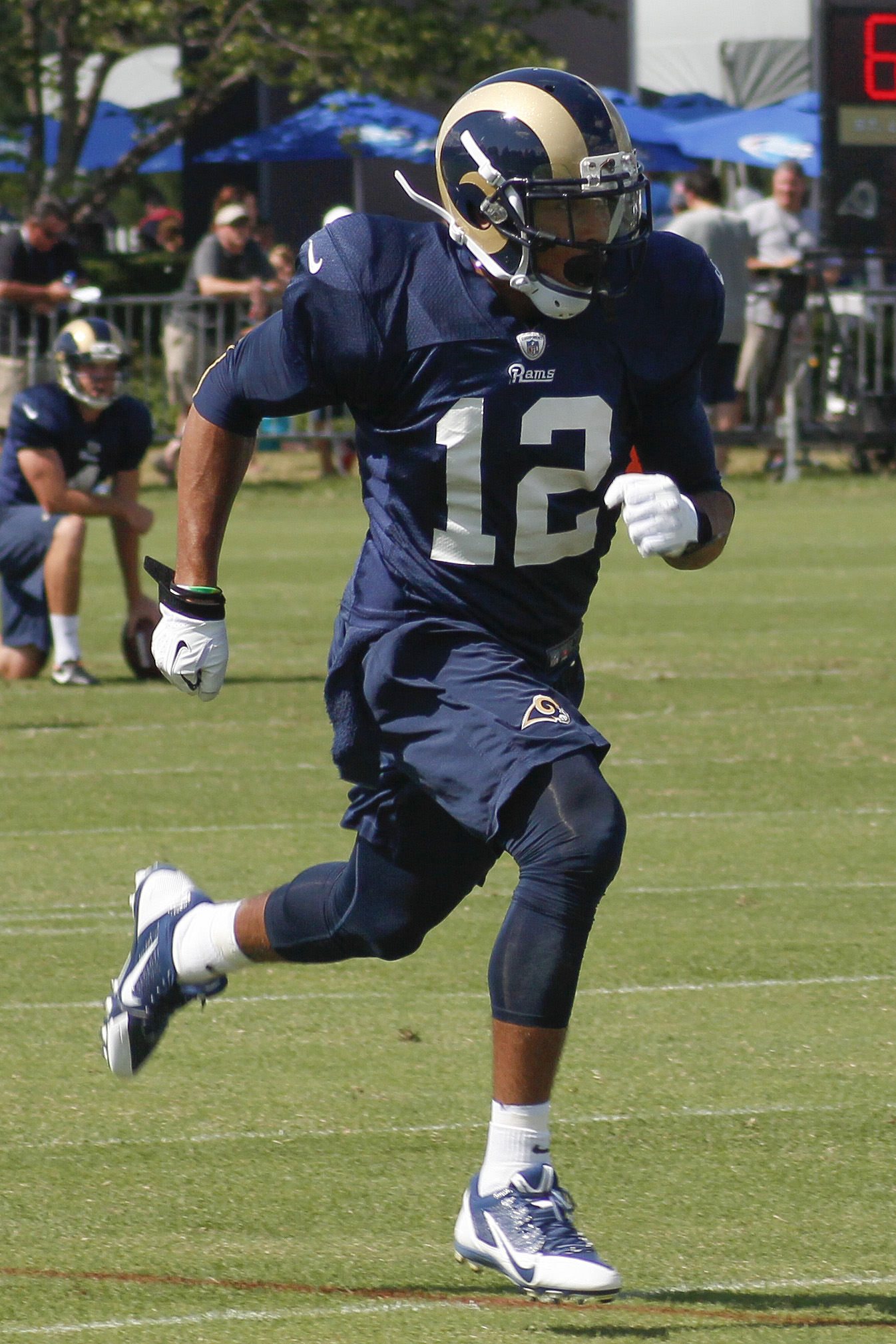
- Bailey with the St. Louis Rams in 2013

No. 12
- Position: Wide receiver

Personal information
- Born: November 11, 1990 (age 35); Miramar, Florida, U.S.
- Listed height: 5 ft 10 in (1.78 m)
- Listed weight: 193 lb (88 kg)

Career information
- High school: Miramar
- College: West Virginia (2010–2012)
- NFL draft: 2013: 3rd round, 92nd overall pick

Career history
- St. Louis Rams (2013–2015)

Awards and highlights
- First-team All-American (2012); First-team All-Big 12 (2012); Second-team All-Big East (2011)

Career NFL statistics
- Receptions: 59
- Receiving yards: 843
- Rushing yards: 46
- Return yards: 127
- Total touchdowns: 4
- Stats at Pro Football Reference

Stedman D. Bailey (born November 11, 1990) is an American former professional football player who was a wide receiver in the National Football League (NFL). He played college football for the West Virginia Mountaineers, earning first-team All-American honors in 2012. Bailey was selected by the St. Louis Rams in the third round of the 2013 NFL draft. He retired in 2015 following life-threatening injuries he sustained from being shot in the head.

== Early life ==
Bailey was born in Miramar, Florida. He attended Miramar High School, and played wide receiver for the Miramar Patriots high school football team. He was a teammate of former Mountaineer quarterback Geno Smith. Bailey caught 68 passes for 1,163 yards and 14 touchdowns in his Miramar career, and was a Class 6A first-team all-state selection as a senior.

== College career ==
Bailey enrolled in West Virginia University, where he played for the West Virginia Mountaineers football team from 2010 to 2012. As a freshman in 2010, he started in nine games for the Mountaineers, playing in 13 total. Earning All-Big East freshman honors from ESPN.com, Bailey was the team's fourth-leading receiver with 24 receptions for 317 yards and four touchdowns. His collegiate debut in week two against Marshall culminated in a season high five receptions for 72 yards, while he produced two touchdown receptions against Maryland in week three. Bailey also produced four catches for 61 yards receiving, including a 32-yard touchdown, against North Carolina State in the Champs Sports Bowl.

Bailey started in all 13 games for the Mountaineers during the 2011 season. He set the Mountaineer single season record for receiving yardage (1,279 yards) and tied the school record for most touchdown receptions (12) in a single season. Bailey's receiving yards ranked 13th in the Division I FBS overall. Bailey's most prolific game of the season came in week six against UConn when he recorded seven receptions for 178 yards and two touchdowns, including a career long 84-yard touchdown reception. Bailey also set a school record with five consecutive 100-yard receiving games, producing seven such performances throughout the season. His season culminated with a five reception, 82 yard and one touchdown performance in the Orange Bowl. Bailey's production in 2011 earned him second-team All-Big East honors from the conference coaches, as well as first-team all-conference honors from Phil Steele and ESPN.com.

=== College statistics ===
Season	GP	Receiving			
Season	GP	Rec	Yds	Avg	TD
2010	13	24	317	13.2	4
2011	13	72	1,279	17.8	12
2012	13	114	1,622	14.2	25
Total	39	210	3,218	15.3	41

== Professional career ==
Pre-draft measurables
Height	Weight	Arm length	Hand span	Wingspan	40-yard dash	10-yard split	20-yard split	20-yard shuttle	Three-cone drill	Vertical jump	Broad jump	Bench press
5 ft 10 1/4 in (1.78 m)	193 lb (88 kg)	32 3/4 in (0.83 m)	9 7/8 in (0.25 m)	6 ft 5 1/8 in (1.96 m)	4.52 s	1.59 s	2.64 s	4.09 s	6.81 s	34.5 in (0.88 m)	9 ft 9 in (2.97 m)	11 reps
All values from NFL Scouting Combine

Bailey decided to forgo his senior season at West Virginia and enter the 2013 NFL draft. He was drafted in the third round, with the 92nd overall pick, by the then St. Louis Rams. He was drafted along with his college teammate Tavon Austin, uniting the two on the Rams.

In May 2014, Stedman was suspended for the first six games of the 2014 season for a violation of the NFL policy on performance-enhancing substances program. He earned NFC Special Teams Player of the Week for Week 7 of the 2014 season on the strength of a punt return for touchdown against the Seattle Seahawks. The play was notable in that Bailey's return was assisted by the Rams' special team selling the punt to one side of the field, while Bailey fielded the ball on the opposite side and returned the ball untouched. In the 2014 season, he had 30 receptions for 435 yards and a touchdown.

In the 2015 season, Bailey appeared in eight games and had 12 receptions for 182 receiving yards and one receiving touchdown.

On June 7, 2016, Bailey was placed on the reserve/non-football injury list to recover from surgery from a serious gunshot wound suffered in November 2015. Bailey worked with the Rams' assistant coaches during the 2016 offseason and later joined the coaching staff of his alma mater West Virginia as a student assistant coach for their football team.

== Shooting ==
On November 24, 2015, Bailey was shot multiple times while sitting in his car with three of his family members in Miami Gardens, Florida. The unknown assailants pulled up alongside them and opened fire before driving off. He survived two gunshot wounds to the head and was in critical condition while his cousin, the driver of the vehicle, sustained life-threatening injuries. Bailey underwent surgery on November 25. At the time of the shooting, Bailey was serving a four-game suspension for violating the league's substance abuse policy on November 9, 2015, and was reinstated by the league on December 7.

== See also ==
- List of NCAA major college football yearly receiving leaders
- List of NCAA Division I FBS career receiving touchdowns leaders
