= Tavon Austin =

American football player (born 1990)

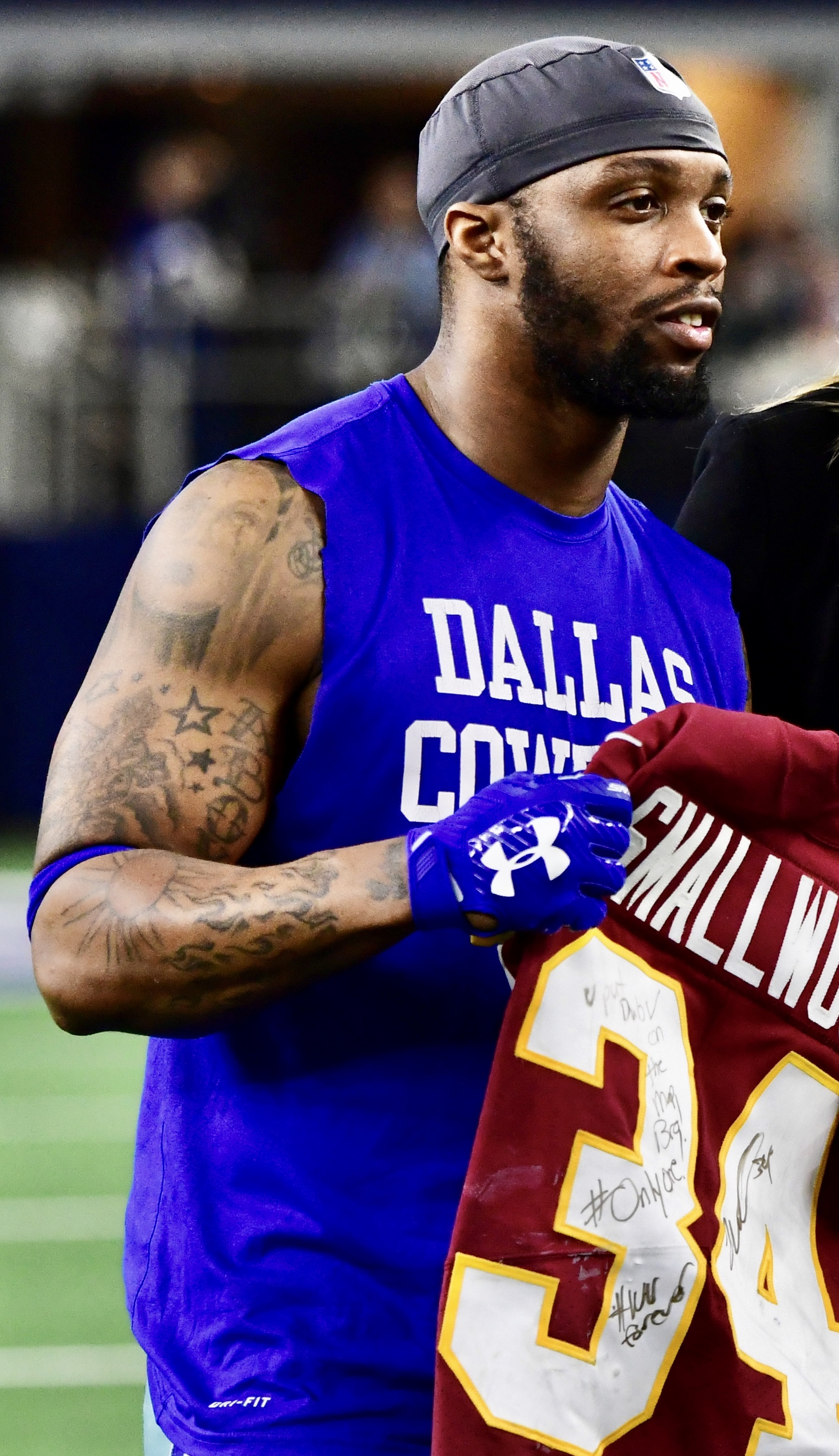
- Austin with the Dallas Cowboys in 2019

No. 11, 10, 16, 7
- Position: Wide receiver

Personal information
- Born: March 15, 1990 (age 36); Baltimore, Maryland, U.S.
- Listed height: 5 ft 8 in (1.73 m)
- Listed weight: 185 lb (84 kg)

Career information
- High school: Dunbar (Baltimore)
- College: West Virginia (2009–2012)
- NFL draft: 2013: 1st round, 8th overall pick

Career history
- St. Louis / Los Angeles Rams (2013–2017); Dallas Cowboys (2018–2019); San Francisco 49ers (2020); Green Bay Packers (2020); Jacksonville Jaguars (2021); Buffalo Bills (2022)*
- * Offseason or practice squad member only

Awards and highlights
- PFWA All-Rookie Team (2013); Paul Hornung Award (2012); Jet Award (2012); 2× First-team All-American (2011, 2012); Big 12 Special Teams Player of the Year (2012); Big East Special Teams Player of the Year (2011); First-team All-Big 12 (2012); First-team All-Big East (2011); Second-team All-Big East (2010)

Career NFL statistics
- Receptions: 244
- Receiving yards: 2,239
- Receiving touchdowns: 16
- Rushing yards: 1,361
- Rushing touchdowns: 10
- Return yards: 1,934
- Return touchdowns: 3
- Stats at Pro Football Reference

Tavon Wesley Austin (born March 15, 1990) is an American former professional football player who was a wide receiver for nine seasons in the National Football League (NFL). He played college football for the West Virginia Mountaineers, receiving first-team All-American honors twice and was selected by the St. Louis Rams in the first round of the 2013 NFL draft.

== Early life ==
Austin was born in Baltimore, Maryland. He attended Dunbar High School in Baltimore, Maryland, where he played football, basketball, and ran track.

In football, he played running back, leading Dunbar High to three consecutive Class 1A state titles. As a senior, he had 2,660 yards rushing on 218 carries with 34 touchdowns, while also returning 12 punts for 446 yards and two scores.

He was a two-time consensus Maryland Offensive Player of the Year and consensus First Team all-state. He set state records for career points (790), touchdowns (123), total offensive yards (9,258) and rushing yards (7,962). In track & field, Austin competed as a sprinter and jumper. He ran a career-best time of 11.47 seconds in the 100 meters at the 2009 1A North Region Meet. He was also a member of the Dunbar 400m relay squad.

== College career ==
Austin accepted a football scholarship from West Virginia University, where he played for the Mountaineers from 2009 to 2012. His primary position was changed to wide receiver as a freshman in 2009, but he still occasionally was used as a running back. During his freshman season, he had 15 receptions for 151 yards with a touchdown and also rushed for 47 yards on six carries with a touchdown and scored a touchdown on a kick return.

As a sophomore in 2010, he had 58 receptions for 787 yards and a team leading eight touchdowns. He also had 15 rushing attempts for 159 yards and a touchdown.

As a junior in 2011, Austin had 100 receptions for 1,180 yards and eight touchdowns. He added 189 rushing yards on 18 carries and another touchdown. He also returned two kicks for touchdowns. He was named a first team All-American by CBS Sports. During the Mountaineers 70–33 win in the 2012 Orange Bowl, he set an Orange Bowl record with four touchdown receptions.

As a senior in 2012, he finished with 114 receptions for 1,289 receiving yards and 12 receiving touchdowns to go along with 643 rushing yards and three rushing touchdowns. In addition, he had 32 kick returns for 813 net return yards and a kick return touchdown and 15 punt returns for 165 net return yards and a punt return touchdown. On November 17, in a game against the Oklahoma Sooners, Austin posted a career-high 572 all-purpose yards - 344 rushing yards, 82 receiving yards, and an additional 146 yards on kick returns. Despite his efforts, West Virginia would lose the game in the final seconds, 50-49. He was the 2012 All-Purpose Performer of the Year as announced by the College Football Performance Awards association.

== Professional career ==
Pre-draft measurables
Height	Weight	Arm length	Hand span	Wingspan	40-yard dash	10-yard split	20-yard split	20-yard shuttle	Vertical jump	Broad jump	Bench press	Wonderlic
5 ft 8 1/2 in (1.74 m)	174 lb (79 kg)	30 in (0.76 m)	9 1/8 in (0.23 m)	5 ft 10 5/8 in (1.79 m)	4.34 s	1.55 s	2.56 s	4.01 s	32 in (0.81 m)	10 ft 0 in (3.05 m)	14 reps	7
All values from NFL Combine

=== St. Louis / Los Angeles Rams ===
==== 2013 season ====
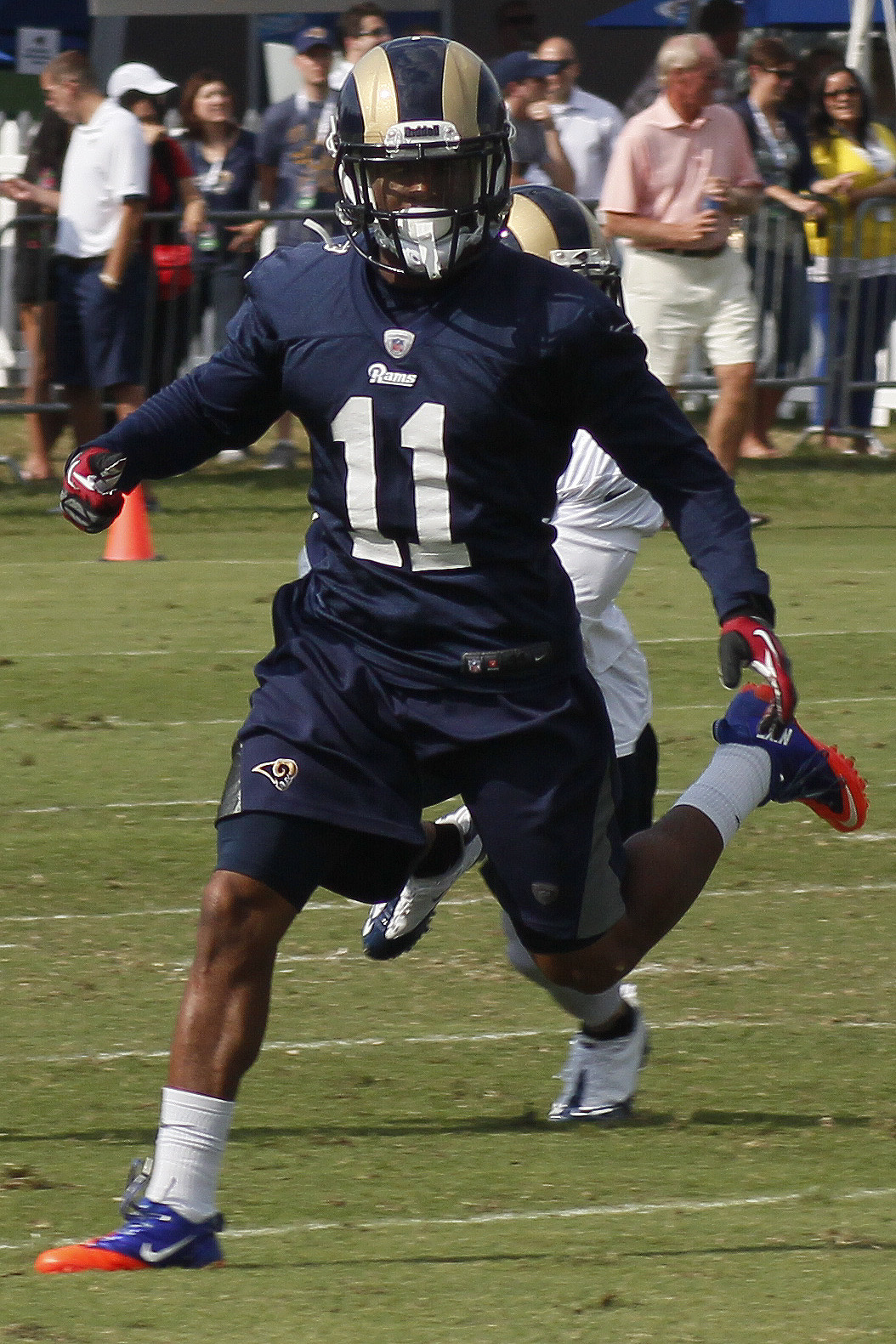
Austin with the St. Louis Rams in 2013

Austin was selected by the St. Louis Rams in the first round (8th overall) of the 2013 NFL draft. The Rams traded up from pick 16 with the Buffalo Bills in order to select Austin. The Rams also selected former West Virginia wide receiver Stedman Bailey later in the third round of the draft with the 92nd overall pick, reuniting the teammates in the National Football League (NFL).

On June 13, 2013, Austin signed a four-year, $12.751 million rookie contract. The deal included a $7.653 million signing bonus. During his first year in the NFL, Austin played 13 games with 151 rushing yards (on nine carries), 418 receiving yards, and 678 return yards on 51 combined return opportunities during kick and punt returns.

In Week 10, against the Indianapolis Colts, Austin had a breakout performance that ended up being the best of his rookie campaign. In a 38–8 rout, Austin only had two receptions, but they totaled 138 receiving yards and were both touchdowns. He also ran the ball once for four yards. Austin also returned five kicks and punts for a total of 172 yards, including a 98-yard punt return touchdown. Austin was named NFC Special Teams Player of the Week, and eventually became the NFC's Special Teams Player of the Month as well. He was named to the PFWA All-Rookie Team.

==== 2014 season ====
Austin's receiving yards in the 2014 season dropped down to 242 yards from his 418 yards in 2013. Austin continued to excel as a returner as he was named a Pro Bowl alternate as a returner behind Devin Hester and Darren Sproles. His 391 punt return yards ranked 3rd in the NFL in 2014—only behind DeAnthony Thomas of the Kansas City Chiefs and Sproles.

Similar to his 98-yard punt return during his rookie season, Austin was part of another huge special teams play during the 2014 season as well. During the second quarter of a Week 7 game against the division rival Seattle Seahawks, a game in which the Rams were already up 14–3, Austin was the designated punt return man on a play. He acted as if he was calling for a fair catch, but the ball had actually been punted to the opposite side of the field, where teammate Stedman Bailey was preparing to return the punt. With the entire Seattle coverage team focused on Austin, Bailey was left with a wide-open field and returned the punt 90 yards for a touchdown. The Rams went on defeat their NFC West rivals 28–26. Austin earned NFC Special Teams Player of the Week for his Week 14 game against Washington. He had a 78-yard punt return for a touchdown in the game.

==== 2015 season ====
Austin was named NFC Special Teams Player of the Week for his Week 1 game against the Seattle Seahawks. He had a 75-yard punt return for a touchdown in the game. Austin had arguably his best season in 2015. He posted career highs in receptions (52), receiving yards (473), and receiving touchdowns (five). Austin further proved to be a dynamic player on offense as he ran the ball 52 times for 434 yards and four touchdowns. After a Thursday Night Football game against the Tampa Bay Buccaneers, Austin became the first player to score at least five receiving touchdowns, four rushing touchdowns, and a punt return touchdown in a single season since Gale Sayers did so for the Chicago Bears in 1965.

==== 2016 season ====
On May 12, 2016, the Los Angeles Rams picked up Austin's fifth-year option along with fellow Rams teammate and linebacker Alec Ogletree. On August 27, 2016, the Rams and Austin agreed to a four-year, $42 million contract extension. Austin finished a 4–12 season with 58 catches for 509 yards and three touchdowns, but on 107 targets (8.8 yards per catch, 4.8 yards per target).

Despite having his first year with over 500 receiving yards, Austin's rushing total of 159 yards and one touchdown on 28 rushes (5.7 yards per carry, at the time a career low for Austin) signaled a drop in his overall production from the previous season. He also failed to return a punt for a touchdown, something he had accomplished every year prior, and tied a career-high for fumbles with five.

==== 2017 season ====
Austin's production took a dramatic drop off in 2017, including numerous statistical career lows. Under new head coach Sean McVay the Rams reached the playoffs for the first time since 2004, but Austin's contributions to the team during the 16 games he played in were almost nonexistent. Austin was targeted mostly with short passes, or was phased out of the passing game altogether, failing to catch a pass in 10 games, and not being targeted for a pass in six of those. Austin predominantly became used as a runner on jet sweeps or during garbage time, and was also removed from his special teams duties after Week 5 due to fumbling issues, as well as his career low 4.4 average return per punt on 12 attempts.

Austin caught 13 passes for 47 yards and rushed a career high 59 runs, but the 270 rushing yards meant a new career low average of 4.6 yards per rush on the year. His 317 total yards from scrimmage was also a new career low. As in 2016, Austin tied his career high for fumbles with five, and set a new career high in lost fumbles, with four. His lone touchdown, from a 27-yard run, marked a low in scoring for Austin; 2017 was the second year of Austin's career without a receiving touchdown, as well as his second consecutive year without a returning score. Through five years as a Ram, Austin had only one game of at least 100 yards receiving, and only five games with at least 100 yards from scrimmage.

==== 2018 season ====
During the 2018 off-season, there were reports that the Rams would be interested in trading or releasing Austin. However on March 15, 2018, Austin agreed to a restructured contract that voided the final three years of his contract while paying him his $5 million in guarantees and an additional $3 million in incentives.

=== Dallas Cowboys ===
==== 2018 season ====
On April 28, 2018, Austin was traded to the Dallas Cowboys in exchange for a 2018 sixth-round draft pick (#192-Jamil Demby), to help replace Cole Beasley as the team's slot wide receiver. In Week 2 of the 2018 season, against the New York Giants, Austin recorded a 64-yard touchdown reception for his first with the Cowboys, and his first since 2017.

Austin suffered a groin injury in the sixth game against the Jacksonville Jaguars, forcing him to miss the last nine contests of the season, which contributed to his third consecutive year with lower output in terms of yards from scrimmage. However in seven games played, Austin's effectiveness as a receiver increased with two receiving touchdowns, as well as the first year since his rookie season averaging at least 10 yards per reception, setting a new career high.

In limited touches as a rusher, Austin failed to score for the first time in his career, but had his highest average per carry since his rookie season. 2018 was the first year of Austin's career without a kickoff return, but his punt returning was slightly improved from the previous season, and for the first time in Austin's career, he did not have a single fumble.

He was able to return for the playoffs, where he caught two passes for five yards, and rushed once for a loss of three yards in two games. In the Wild Card Round against the Seattle Seahawks, he made a 51-yard punt return and had a 75-yard punt return called back because of a holding penalty.

==== 2019 season ====
On March 14, 2019, Austin re-signed with the Cowboys. In Week 15 against his former team, the Los Angeles Rams, Austin caught one pass for a 59-yard touchdown during the 44–21 win. With the addition of Randall Cobb to be the team's slot wide receiver, although Austin was the number 4 wide receiver, he never had a clear role in the offense during the season. He appeared in 14 games and missed two contests with a concussion he suffered in the season opener. He collected 13 receptions for 177 yards, one receiving touchdown, six carries for 47 yards and one rushing touchdown.

=== San Francisco 49ers ===
Austin was signed by the San Francisco 49ers on August 15, 2020. He was placed on injured reserve on September 3, 2020. He was released from injured reserve with an injury settlement on October 27.

=== Green Bay Packers ===
On December 1, 2020, Austin signed with the Green Bay Packers, reuniting with head coach Matt LaFleur, who was his offensive coordinator with the Los Angeles Rams. He appeared in four games as a backup wide receiver and was declared inactive for one contest. He had five receptions for 20 yards.

=== Jacksonville Jaguars ===
Austin signed with the Jacksonville Jaguars on August 6, 2021. He was placed on injured reserve on September 2, 2021. He was activated on September 30. In the 2021 season, Austin appeared in 13 games and recorded 24 receptions for 213 receiving yards and one receiving touchdown.

=== Buffalo Bills ===
Austin signed with the Buffalo Bills on June 2, 2022. He was released on August 22. He was re-signed to the practice squad on August 31. He was released again on October 5.

=== Retirement ===
On August 13, 2024, Austin announced his retirement from professional football.

== Career statistics ==
=== NFL ===
==== Regular season ====
Year	Team	Games		Receiving					Rushing					Punt returning					Fumbles	
Year	Team	GP	GS	Rec	Yds	Avg	Lng	TD	Att	Yds	Avg	Lng	TD	Ret	Yds	Avg	Lng	TD	Fum	Lost
2013	STL	13	3	40	418	10.5	81T	4	9	151	16.8	65T	1	33	280	8.5	98T	1	4	1
2014	STL	15	8	31	242	7.8	28	0	36	224	6.2	19	2	35	391	11.2	78	1	5	0
2015	STL	16	15	52	473	9.1	66T	5	52	434	8.3	60	4	34	268	7.9	75	1	3	2
2016	LAR	15	15	58	509	8.8	43T	3	28	159	5.7	30T	1	44	364	8.3	47	0	5	1
2017	LAR	16	9	13	47	3.6	13	0	59	270	4.6	27T	1	12	53	4.4	12	0	5	4
2018	DAL	7	0	8	140	17.5	64T	2	6	55	9.2	18	0	10	58	5.8	22	0	0	0
2019	DAL	14	0	13	177	13.6	59T	1	6	47	7.8	20T	1	17	84	4.9	15	0	1	0
2020	GB	4	0	5	20	4.0	7	0	0	0	0	0	0	3	14	4.7	7	0	1	1
2021	JAX	13	3	24	213	8.9	25	1	3	21	7.0	8	0	2	3	1.5	3	0	1	1
Total		101	50	221	2,034	9.2	81T	16	196	1,340	6.8	65T	10	188	1,512	8.0	98T	3	24	9

==== Postseason ====
Year	Team	Games		Receiving					Rushing					Returning					Fumbles	
Year	Team	GP	GS	Rec	Yds	Avg	Lng	TD	Att	Yds	Avg	Lng	TD	Ret	Yds	Avg	Lng	TD	Fum	Lost
2017	LAR	1	1	0	0	0.0	0	0	0	0	0.0	0	0	0	0	0.0	0	0	0	0
2018	DAL	2	1	2	5	2.5	7	0	1	−3	−3.0	−3	0	5	73	14.6	51	0	0	0
2020	GB	2	0	0	0	0.0	0	0	0	0	0	0	0	2	17	8.5	9	0	0	0
Total		5	2	2	5	2.5	7	0	1	−3	−3.0	−3	0	7	90	12.9	51	0	0	0

=== College ===
Season	Team	GP	Receiving				Rushing				Punt returning				Kick returning			
Season	Team	GP	Rec	Yds	Avg	TD	Att	Yds	Avg	TD	Att	Yds	Avg	TD	Att	Yds	Avg	TD
2009	West Virginia	13	15	151	10.1	1	6	47	7.8	1	0	0	0.0	0	17	426	25.1	1
2010	West Virginia	13	58	787	13.6	8	16	161	10.1	1	0	0	0.0	0	12	230	19.2	0
2011	West Virginia	13	101	1,186	11.7	8	16	182	11.4	1	19	268	14.1	0	36	938	26.1	2
2012	West Virginia	13	114	1,289	11.3	12	72	643	8.9	3	15	165	11.0	1	32	813	25.4	1
Total		52	288	3,413	11.9	29	110	1,033	9.4	6	34	433	12.7	1	97	2,407	24.8	4
