= Khori Ivy =

American football player (born 1978)

No. 2, 15, 80
- Position: Offensive specialist

Personal information
- Born: March 16, 1978 (age 48); Boca Raton, Florida, U.S.
- Listed height: 6 ft 4 in (1.93 m)
- Listed weight: 218 lb (99 kg)

Career information
- High school: Community (Boca Raton)
- College: West Virginia
- NFL draft: 2001: undrafted

Career history
- New England Patriots (2001)*; Tampa Bay Buccaneers (2001)*; Cincinnati Bengals (2001–2002)*; Barcelona Dragons (2002); Pittsburgh Steelers (2002–2003)*; Detroit Fury (2003); Los Angeles Avengers (2004-2005); Utah Blaze (2006)*
- * Offseason or practice squad member only

Career AFL statistics
- Receptions: 20
- Receiving yards: 200
- Receiving touchdowns: 6
- Stats at ArenaFan.com

Khori Ivy (born March 16, 1978) is an American former professional football offensive specialist who is now a football coach at the Wide Receiver Academy. He is currently teaching at Don Estridge High Tech Middle School as well as Boca Raton Community High School. He attended Boca Raton High School and played football, basketball and track & field. He then attended West Virginia where he played wide receiver.

== Early life ==
Ivy was born in Boca Raton, Florida. He graduated in 1996 from Boca Raton Community High School.

== College career ==
Ivy was a starter for three years at West Virginia. In his freshman season, 1997, Ivy recorded 19 receptions for 282 yards and a touchdown. In 1998, he recorded 41 receptions for 658 yards and six touchdowns in his first season as a starter. As a junior in 1999, he recorded a career-high 53 receptions for 666 yards and five touchdowns. In his final college season, 2000, Ivy recorded 47 receptions for career-highs 806 yards and seven touchdowns. His best game was against Temple, when he recorded 155 yards. He also had a career-high two touchdowns against Mississippi in the same season, while he had a career-long 64-yard reception again Boston College as a senior as well. He also earned the Big East Academic All-Star Award as a senior and was named team MVP.

He finished his collegiate career ranked second in Mountaineer history for receiving yards (2,412) and third in career receptions (160). Ivy graduated with a degree in physical education.

== Professional career ==
After going undrafted in the 2001 NFL draft, Ivy spent time on the practice squads of the New England Patriots and Cincinnati Bengals. He was released by the Bengals on August 27, 2001. Ivy spent time with the Tampa Bay Buccaneers but was released.

In 2002, Ivy played in the NFL Europe with the Barcelona Dragons. He ended the season with the Dragons catching 27 passes for 350 yards and two touchdowns for the season.

Ivy began his career in the Arena Football League playing for the Detroit Fury in 2003, but suffered an injury during training camp. He spent some of 2002 on the Pittsburgh Steelers practice squad. Ivy attended the Cris Carter FAST Program. He went to the Steelers 2003 training camp and suffered a pre-season concussion from a helmet-to-helmet hit by Dallas Cowboys strong safety Darren Woodson. He was cut on September 1, 2003.

On October 22, 2004 Ivy signed a three-year contract with the Los Angeles Avengers. He recorded 200 yards on 20 receptions for 6 touchdowns in 2005.

In 2006, Ivy played for the Utah Blaze, however on January 22, 2006, he was waived.

== Coaching career ==
In 2007, Ivy became the wide receivers coach at Boca Raton Community High School. In 2010, he became the wide receivers coach at Park Vista Community High School in Lake Worth, Florida. In 2011, he became a physical education coach at Don Estridge High Tech Middle School in Boca Raton, Florida.

== See also ==
- List of National Football League and Arena football players
