= Shawn Foreman =

American football player (born 1975)

No. 16
- Position: Wide receiver / linebacker

Personal information
- Born: June 3, 1975 (age 51); Chesapeake, Virginia, U.S.
- Listed height: 6 ft 1 in (1.85 m)
- Listed weight: 205 lb (93 kg)

Career information
- High school: Indian River (Chesapeake, Virginia)
- College: West Virginia
- NFL draft: 1999: undrafted

Career history
- New York Jets (1999)*; Oklahoma Wranglers (2001); Dallas Desperados (2002)*; Indiana Firebirds (2002–2003); Grand Rapids Rampage (2004)
- * Offseason or practice squad member only

Awards and highlights
- 2× All-Big East First-team selection (1997, 1998); 1998 Offensive Co-Captain West Virginia Mountaineers

Career AFL statistics
- Receptions: 68
- Receiving yards: 809
- Receiving TDs: 18
- Tackles: 81
- Interceptions: 6
- Stats at ArenaFan.com

Shawn Foreman (born June 3, 1975) is an American former football wide receiver. He played college football at West Virginia.

In his career, Foreman has played for the New York Jets, the Oklahoma Wranglers, the Indiana Firebirds, and the Grand Rapids Rampage.

== High school career ==
Foreman attended Indian River High School in Chesapeake, Virginia. While there, he was a First-team All-City, All-County, All-Area & All-Tidewater Conference choice as a wide receiver, and also Class AAA All-Virginia honors. Foreman caught a record 62 passes for 1,008 yards as a senior. He was also a standout baseball & basketball player. In 1995 Foreman decided that he wanted to be a school teacher.

== College career ==
While at West Virginia, Foreman majored in Child Development and Family Studies. He was a member of the Athletic Director's Academic Honor Roll and he was also a recipient of the Gail W. Cunningham endowed scholarship.

In 1995 as a freshman, Foreman was a back-up strong safety until switching to Flanker for the last month of the season. He recorded 15 tackles (six solos) with a fumble recovery. In three games on offense, he caught four passes for 56 yards.

Against Virginia Tech, Foreman recorded a blocked punt which he recovered, and recorded four tackles. Against Rutgers, Foreman played both offense and defense, recording one reception for five yards, and three tackles. In the Backyard Brawl, Foreman recorded a season-long 23-yard reception.

In 1996 as a sophomore, Foreman appeared in every game of the season as a back-up wide receiver. He finished the season with 25 catches for 415 yards a 16.6 yards per reception average and three touchdowns. He also served as a back-up strong safety, recording six tackles (two solos).

Against Rutgers, he recorded two touchdown receptions, 23 and 48-yards, as well as six catches for 164 yards.

In 1997 as a junior, Foreman was an All-Big East First-team selection. He led the conference and set a school single-season record with 77 receptions, for 928 yards averaging 12.1 yards per reception, (third-best season total in WVU history) and five touchdowns.

Against Georgia Tech, he recorded 12 receptions, tying a school record, for 110 yards in the Carquest Bowl.

While being a year away from his degree, Foreman said, that he would possibly go to graduate school, and that if the NFL did not interfere, that he had his heart set on going back to school, as an elementary school teacher.

In 1998 as a senior, Foreman was an All-Big East First-team selection once again. He received the Iron Mountaineer Award as the top performer in the winter workout program. He served as an offensive co-captain for the Mountaineers. He started every game of the season at flanker, finishing second on the team with 63 receptions for 948 yards, a 15.0 yards per reception average, and eight touchdowns. Only David Saunders (1,043 in 1996) gained more yards receiving in a single-season for the Mountaineers. Foreman also recorded two tackles.

Against Missouri in the Insight.com Bowl, he ended his college career with a career-high 11 receptions for 189 yards. His 11 receptions ranked fifth on the school’s record books and his 189 yards ranked sixth.

=== Career statistics ===
Career Statistics			Receiving				
Year	Team	G	Rec	Yards	Y/R	TD	LNG
1995	West Virginia Mountaineers	11	4	53	13.3	0	23
1996	West Virginia Mountaineers	12	25	415	16.6	3	65
1997	West Virginia Mountaineers	12	77	928	12.7	5	46
1998	West Virginia Mountaineers	12	63	948	15.0	8	48
Total		47	169	2,347	13.9	16	65

	Career Defensive Statistics														
Year	Team	G	Tack	Solo	Ast	TFL	Sack	FF	FR	Int	Yds	Lng	TD	Pass Def.	Block
1995	West Virginia Mountaineers	11	15	6	9	0	0	0	1	0	0	0	0	0	0
1996	West Virginia Mountaineers	12	6	2	4	0	0	0	0	0	0	0	0	0	0
1997	West Virginia Mountaineers	12	0	0	0	0	0	0	0	0	0	0	0	0	0
1998	West Virginia Mountaineers	12	2	1	1	0	0	0	0	0	0	0	0	0	0
Total		47	23	9	14	0	0	0	1	0	0	0	0	0	0

Foremnas 169 career receptions rank second on the West Virginia all-time receptions list. His 2,347 receiving yards ranks third on the West Virginia all-time receiving yardage list. Foreman's 16 career touchdown receptions is tied for seventh best on the West Virginia all-time touchdown receptions list.

== Professional career ==
=== National Football League (1999) ===
Foreman went unselected in the 1999 NFL draft, though he later signed with the New York Jets on April 20. However, he failed to make the team and was later released. He was out of football in 2000.

=== Arena Football League (2001–2004) ===
==== Oklahoma Wranglers (2001) ====
In 2001, Foreman entered the Arena Football League with the Oklahoma Wranglers. During his rookie season, he finished third on the team in receiving. For the season, he recorded 33 receptions for 406 yards and nine touchdowns. He also finished third on defense, with 24.5 tackles, one pass break up, two forced fumbles, one fumble recovery, and one interception.

==== Dallas Desperados ====
Foreman signed with the Dallas Desperados for 2002. He was waived on March 25, 2002.

==== Indiana Firebirds (2002–2003) ====
On April 12, 2002, Foreman was signed by the Indiana Firebirds. For the season, he finished eight on the team in receiving, only playing in four game. He had five receptions for 29 yards. He also, finished fourth on the team in defense, recording 36 tackles, one pass break up, one fumble recovery, and one interception for 16 yards.

In 2003, Foreman finished 10th on the team in receiving. For the season he recorded five receptions for 78 yards, and three touchdowns. He also finished fifth on the team in defense, recording 41.5 tackles, one pass broken up, one forced fumble, one fumble recovery, and three interceptions for 21 yards, and once again only playing in four games.

In 2004 Foreman joined the Grand Rapids Rampage, he finished sixth on the team in receiving. He recorded 25 receptions for 296 yards, and six touchdowns. He also finished 12th on the team in defense, recording 15 tackles, one pass broken up, one forced fumble, one fumble recovery, and one interception.

During his last appearance of the season, and subsequently his career, week 14 against the Chicago Rush, Foreman recorded one reception for 18 yards.

=== Career statistics ===
Career Statistics			Receiving				
Year	Team	G	Rec	Yards	Y/R	TD	LNG
2001	Oklahoma Wranglers	11	33	406	12.3	9	--
2002	Indiana Firebirds	4	5	29	5.8	0	--
2003	Indiana Firebirds	4	5	78	15.6	3	--
2004	Grand Rapids Rampage	8	25	296	11.8	6	--
Total		27	68	809	11.9	18	--

	Career Defensive Statistics													
Year	Team	G	Tack	Solo	Ast	TFL	Sack	FF	FR	Int	Yds	Lng	TD	Pass Def.
2001	Oklahoma Wranglers	11	17	2	15	0	0	2	1	1	0	0	0	1
2002	Indiana Firebirds	4	29	15	14	0	0	0	1	1	16	16	0	1
2003	Indiana Firebirds	4	29	2	27	0	0	1	1	3	21	--	0	1
2004	Grand Rapids Rampage	8	6	14	8	0	0	1	1	1	0	0	0	1
Total		27	81	9	72	0	0	4	4	6	37	--	0	4
