= 2018 Cincinnati Bengals season =

51st season in franchise history

- Owner: Mike Brown
- Head coach: Marvin Lewis
- Home stadium: Paul Brown Stadium

Results
- Record: 6–10
- Division place: 4th AFC North
- Playoffs: Did not qualify
- Pro Bowlers: DT Geno Atkins

Uniform
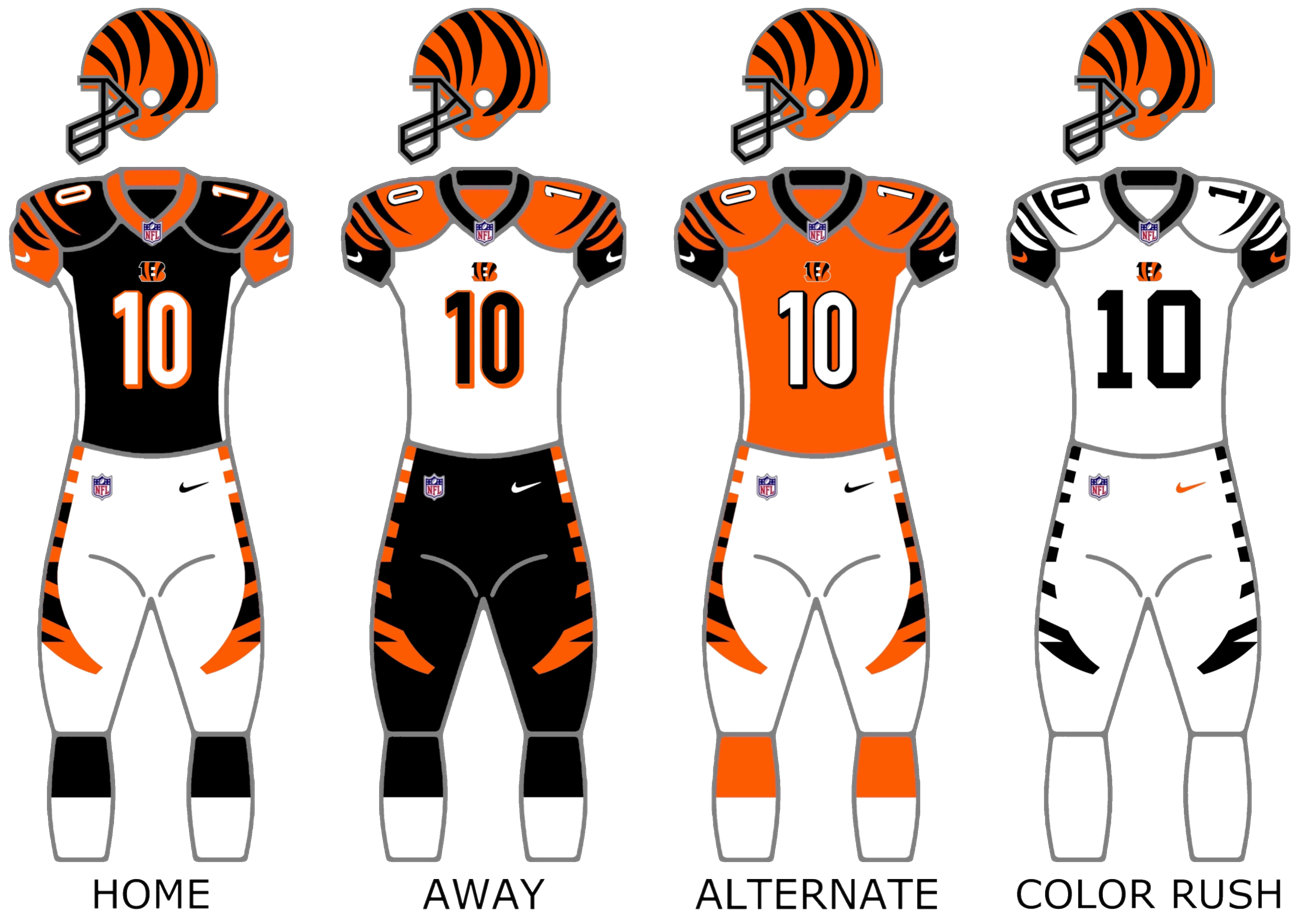

The 2018 season was the Cincinnati Bengals' 49th season in the National Football League (NFL), their 51st overall and their 16th and final under head coach Marvin Lewis. The Bengals failed to improve upon their 2017 campaign as they collapsed to a 6–10 finish (after a 4–1 start) to finish in 4th place in the AFC North. This marked the 3rd consecutive season the Bengals failed to make the playoffs.

Longtime coach Marvin Lewis and team owner Mike Brown announced a mutual parting of ways following this season after 16 seasons. Despite leading the Bengals to 4 division titles, and 7 winning seasons/playoff appearances, Lewis was unable to lead the Bengals to a single playoff win. He holds the record for most wins, seasons, and playoff losses for a head coach without a playoff win.

== Offseason ==
=== Free agents ===
==== Unrestricted ====
| Position | Player | 2018 Team | Date signed | Contract |
|---|---|---|---|---|
| P | Kevin Huber | Cincinnati Bengals | March 15 | 3 years, $7.95 million |
| QB | A. J. McCarron | Buffalo Bills | March 15 | 2 years, $10 million |
| DE | Chris Smith | Cleveland Browns | March 14 | 3 years, $12 million |
| OT | Andre Smith | Arizona Cardinals | March 16 | 2 years, $8 million |
| RB | Jeremy Hill | New England Patriots | March 17 | 1 year, $1.5 million |
| TE | Tyler Eifert | Cincinnati Bengals | March 17 | 1 year, $5.5 million |
| LB | Kevin Minter | New York Jets | April 10 | 1 year, $880K |
| RB | Cedric Peerman | | | |
| OT | Eric Winston | | | |
| DT | Pat Sims | | | |

=== Signings ===
| Position | Player | 2017 team | Date signed | Contract |
|---|---|---|---|---|
| OT | Bobby Hart | New York Giants | February 14 | 1 year, $1 million |
| LB | Preston Brown | Buffalo Bills | March 16 | 1 year, $4 million |
| QB | Matt Barkley | Arizona Cardinals | March 17 | 2 years, $3.1 million |

=== Departures ===
| Position | Player | 2018 team | Contract |
|---|---|---|---|
| WR | Brandon LaFell | Oakland Raiders | 1 year, $1.75 million |
| FS | George Iloka | Minnesota Vikings | 1 year, $880K |
| H-back | Ryan Hewitt | Indianapolis Colts | 1 year, 990K |
| C | T.J. Johnson | | |

== Draft ==
2018 Cincinnati Bengals draft
| Round | Pick | Player | Position | College | Notes |
| 1 | 21 | Billy Price | C | Ohio State | From Buffalo |
| 2 | 54 | Jessie Bates * | S | Wake Forest | From Kansas City |
| 3 | 77 | Sam Hubbard | DE | Ohio State | |
| 3 | 78 | Malik Jefferson | LB | Texas | From Kansas City |
| 4 | 112 | Mark Walton | RB | Miami (FL) | |
| 5 | 151 | Davontae Harris | CB | Illinois State | |
| 5 | 158 | Andrew Brown | DE | Virginia | From Buffalo |
| 5 | 170 | Darius Phillips | CB | Western Michigan | Compensatory pick |
| 7 | 249 | Logan Woodside | QB | Toledo | From New England |
| 7 | 252 | Rod Taylor | G | Ole Miss | Compensatory pick |
| 7 | 253 | Auden Tate | WR | Florida State | Compensatory pick |
Made roster † Pro Football Hall of Fame * Made at least one Pro Bowl during career

Draft trades

- The Bengals traded their first- and sixth-round selections (12th and 187th overall) to Buffalo in exchange for Buffalo's first- and fifth-round selections and tackle Cordy Glenn
- The Bengals traded a conditional selection to Jacksonville in exchange for defensive end Chris Smith. As Smith was on the Bengals' active roster for at least six games during the 2017 season, Jacksonville acquired Cincinnati's seventh-round selection (230th overall).
- The Bengals traded linebacker Marquis Flowers to New England in exchange for New England's seventh-round selection (249th overall).
- The Bengals traded their 2nd-round pick (46th overall) and a 3rd-round pick (100th overall) to the Kansas City Chiefs in exchange for the Chiefs' 2nd-round pick (54th overall) and 3rd-round pick (78th overall).

=== Undrafted free agents ===
| Player | Position | College | Signed | Cut |
|---|---|---|---|---|
| Ka'Raun White | WR | West Virginia | May 8 | September 1 |
| Quinton Flowers | RB | South Florida | May 11 | September 1 |
| Trayvon Henderson | S | Hawaii | May 11 | Placed on IR |
| Chris Worley | LB | Ohio State | May 11 | September 1 |
| Junior Joseph | LB | UConn | May 11 | September 1 |
| Ja'Von Rolland-Jones | DE | Arkansas State | May 11 | August 2 |
| Ray Lawry | RB | Old Dominion | May 11 | August 10 |
| Jordan Franks | TE | UCF | May 11 | September 1 |
| Gaelin Elmore | DE | East Carolina | May 11 | July 17 (Retired) |
| Devonte Boyd | WR | UNLV | May 11 | September 1 |
| Austin Fleer | T | Colorado Mesa | May 11 | August 10 |
| Tyrice Beverette | S | Stony Brook | May 14 | September 1 |
| Brad Lundblade | C | Oklahoma State | May 14 | September 1 |
| Chris Okoye | DT | Ferris State | May 14 | September 1 |
| Jared Murphy | WR | Miami (OH) | July 26 | September 1 |
| Cory Helms | OL | South Carolina | August 4 | August 29 |
| Kayaune Ross | WR | Kentucky | August 4 | September 1 |
| Eddy Wilson | DT | Purdue | August 4 | September 1 |
| Simeyon Robinson | DT | James Madison | August 13 | September 1 |

== Staff ==
2018 Cincinnati Bengals staff
| Front office: President/general manager – Mike Brown; Executive vice president – Katie Blackburn; Vice president of player personnel – Paul H. Brown; Director of player personnel – Duke Tobin; Head coaches: Head coach/defensive coordinator – Marvin Lewis; Special assistant to the Head coach – Hue Jackson; Offensive coaches: Offensive coordinator – Bill Lazor; Quarterbacks – Alex Van Pelt; Running backs – Kyle Caskey; Wide receivers – Bob Bicknell; Tight ends – Jonathan Hayes; Offensive line – Frank Pollack; Offensive assistant/wide receivers – Dan Pitcher; Offensive quality control/offensive line – Robert Couch | Defensive coaches: Defensive line – Jacob Burney; Linebackers – Jim Haslett; Cornerbacks – Daronte Jones; Safeties – Robert Livingston; Defensive assistant – Matt Raich; Defensive quality control/defensive line – Marcus Lewis; Special teams coaches: Special teams coordinator – Darrin Simmons; Assistant special teams/defensive quality control – Brayden Coombs; Strength and conditioning: Head strength and conditioning – Chip Morton; Assistant strength and conditioning – Jeff Friday |

== Final roster ==
2018 Cincinnati Bengals roster
| Quarterbacks (QB): 6 Jeff Driskel; 5 Tom Savage; Running backs (RB): 25 Giovani Bernard; 34 Quinton Flowers; 28 Joe Mixon; 32 Mark Walton; Wide receivers (WR): 16 Cody Core; 12 Alex Erickson; 11 Hunter Sharp; 80 Josh Malone; 15 John Ross; 19 Auden Tate; Tight ends (TE): 88 Jordan Franks; 89 Matt Lengel; 87 C. J. Uzomah | Offensive linemen (OL): 65 Clint Boling G/T; 77 Cordy Glenn T; 68 Bobby Hart T; 66 Trey Hopkins C/G; 70 Cedric Ogbuehi T; 76 Kent Perkins T; 53 Billy Price C; 62 Alex Redmond G; 71 Andre Smith T; 63 Christian Westerman G; Defensive linemen (DL): 97 Geno Atkins DT; 99 Andrew Billings DT; 96 Carlos Dunlap DE; 95 Kasim Edebali DE; 94 Sam Hubbard DE; 90 Michael Johnson DE; 79 Christian Ringo DT; 69 Niles Scott DE; 75 Jordan Willis DE | Linebackers (LB): 51 Brandon Bell OLB; 55 Vontaze Burfict OLB; 56 Hardy Nickerson Jr. MLB; 57 Vincent Rey OLB; 59 Nick Vigil OLB; 47 Chris Worley OLB; Defensive backs (DB): 30 Jessie Bates FS; 21 Darqueze Dennard CB; 42 Clayton Fejedelem FS; 35 Davontae Harris CB; 22 William Jackson CB; 29 Tony McRae CB; 23 Darius Phillips CB; 20 KeiVarae Russell CB; 36 Shawn Williams SS; 40 Brandon Wilson SS; Special teams (ST): 4 Randy Bullock K; 46 Clark Harris LS; 10 Kevin Huber P | Practice squad: 49 Moritz Böhringer TE (IPP); 93 Andrew Brown DT (IR); 7 Connor Cook QB; 43 Chris Cooper CB; 37 Demetrious Cox FS; 61 Brad Lundblade C; 84 Andrew Vollert TE; 17 Kermit Whitfield WR; Reserve: 83 Tyler Boyd WR (IR); 52 Preston Brown MLB (IR); 82 Cethan Carter TE (IR); 14 Andy Dalton QB (IR); 85 Tyler Eifert TE (IR); 50 Jordan Evans OLB (IR); 74 Jake Fisher T (IR); 98 Ryan Glasgow DT (IR); 18 A. J. Green WR (IR); 41 Trayvon Henderson FS (IR); 45 Malik Jefferson OLB (IR); 27 Dre Kirkpatrick CB (IR); 81 Tyler Kroft TE (IR); 58 Carl Lawson OLB (IR); 86 Mason Schreck TE (IR); 64 Rod Taylor G (IR); 91 Josh Tupou DT (IR); 92 Adolphus Washington DT (IR); Rookies in italics 53 active, 19 reserve, 7 practice squad |

=== Roster changes ===
- August 2: Released WR Brandon LaFell after two seasons with the team.
- August 19: Released S George Iloka, who started every game the past two seasons. Iloka spent his first six years in the league with the Bengals.
- August 24: Terminated the contract of DT Chris Baker, who was signed this past offseason as a free agent.

== NFL Top 100 ==
| Rank | Player | Position | Change |
|---|---|---|---|
| 22 | A. J. Green | WR | ▼5 |
| 63 | Geno Atkins | DT | ▲5 |

== Preseason ==
| Week | Date | Opponent | Result | Record | Venue | Recap |
|---|---|---|---|---|---|---|
| 1 | August 9 | Chicago Bears | W 30–27 | 1–0 | Paul Brown Stadium | Recap |
| 2 | August 18 | at Dallas Cowboys | W 21–13 | 2–0 | AT&T Stadium | Recap |
| 3 | August 26 | at Buffalo Bills | W 26–13 | 3–0 | New Era Field | Recap |
| 4 | August 30 | Indianapolis Colts | L 26–27 | 3–1 | Paul Brown Stadium | Recap |

== Regular season ==
=== Schedule ===
| Week | Date | Opponent | Result | Record | Venue | Recap |
|---|---|---|---|---|---|---|
| 1 | September 9 | at Indianapolis Colts | **W** 34–23 | 1–0 | Lucas Oil Stadium | Recap |
| 2 | September 13 | **Baltimore Ravens** | **W** 34–23 | 2–0 | Paul Brown Stadium | Recap |
| 3 | September 23 | at Carolina Panthers | **L** 21–31 | 2–1 | Bank of America Stadium | Recap |
| 4 | September 30 | at Atlanta Falcons | **W** 37–36 | 3–1 | Mercedes-Benz Stadium | Recap |
| 5 | October 7 | Miami Dolphins | **W** 27–17 | 4–1 | Paul Brown Stadium | Recap |
| 6 | October 14 | **Pittsburgh Steelers** | **L** 21–28 | 4–2 | Paul Brown Stadium | Recap |
| 7 | October 21 | at Kansas City Chiefs | **L** 10–45 | 4–3 | Arrowhead Stadium | Recap |
| 8 | October 28 | Tampa Bay Buccaneers | **W** 37–34 | 5–3 | Paul Brown Stadium | Recap |
| 9 | Bye | | | | | |
| 10 | November 11 | New Orleans Saints | **L** 14–51 | 5–4 | Paul Brown Stadium | Recap |
| 11 | November 18 | at **Baltimore Ravens** | **L** 21–24 | 5–5 | M&T Bank Stadium | Recap |
| 12 | November 25 | **Cleveland Browns** | **L** 20–35 | 5–6 | Paul Brown Stadium | Recap |
| 13 | December 2 | Denver Broncos | **L** 10–24 | 5–7 | Paul Brown Stadium | Recap |
| 14 | December 9 | at Los Angeles Chargers | **L** 21–26 | 5–8 | StubHub Center | Recap |
| 15 | December 16 | Oakland Raiders | **W** 30–16 | 6–8 | Paul Brown Stadium | Recap |
| 16 | December 23 | at **Cleveland Browns** | **L** 18–26 | 6–9 | FirstEnergy Stadium | Recap |
| 17 | December 30 | at **Pittsburgh Steelers** | **L** 13–16 | 6–10 | Heinz Field | Recap |

Note: Intra-division opponents are in bold text.

=== Game summaries ===
==== Week 1: at Indianapolis Colts ====
Week One: Cincinnati Bengals at Indianapolis Colts – Game summary

| Quarter | 1 | 2 | 3 | 4 | Total |
|---|---|---|---|---|---|
| **Bengals** | 3 | 7 | 7 | 17 | **34** |
| Colts | 3 | 13 | 7 | 0 | **23** |

at Lucas Oil Stadium, Indianapolis, Indiana

- Date: September 9
- Game time: 1:00 p.m. EDT
- Game weather: Played indoors (retractable roof closed)
- Game attendance: 58,699
- Referee: Pete Morelli
- TV announcers (CBS): Andrew Catalon, James Lofton, and Jane Slater
- Recap, Gamebook

Game information

**First quarter**

- CIN – Randy Bullock 42-yard field goal, 8:20. Bengals 3–0. **Drive: 10 plays, 69 yards, 4:50.**
- IND – Adam Vinatieri 21-yard field goal, 1:23. Tied 3–3. **Drive: 14 plays, 72 yards, 6:57.**

**Second quarter**

- IND – Eric Ebron 26-yard pass from Andrew Luck (Adam Vinatieri kick), 12:02. Colts 10–3. **Drive: 7 plays, 58 yards, 3:02.**
- IND – Adam Vinatieri 38-yard field goal, 3:01. Colts 13–3. **Drive: 12 plays, 58 yards, 6:23.**
- CIN – John Ross 3-yard pass from Andy Dalton (Randy Bullock kick), 1:44. Colts 13–10. **Drive, 5 plays, 75 yards, 1:17.**
- IND – Adam Vinatieri 51-yard field goal, 0:02. Colts 16–10. **Drive, 8 plays, 43 yards, 1:42.**

**Third quarter**

- IND – T. Y. Hilton 5-yard pass from Andrew Luck (Adam Vinatieri kick), 8:13. Colts 23–10. **Drive: 9 plays, 60 yards, 3:17.**
- CIN – A. J. Green 38-yard pass from Andy Dalton (Randy Bullock kick), 4:09. Colts 23–17. **Drive: 8 plays, 75 yards, 4:04.**

**Fourth quarter**

- CIN – Joe Mixon 1-yard run (Randy Bullock kick), 11:07. Bengals 24–23. **Drive: 7 plays, 55 yards, 4:05.**
- CIN – Randy Bullock 39-yard field goal, 3:57. Bengals 27–23. **Drive: 11 plays, 58 yards, 5:56.**
- CIN – Clayton Fejedelem 83-yard fumble return (Randy Bullock kick), 0:24. Bengals 34–23. **Drive: 13 plays, 58 yards, 3:33.**

**Top passers**

- CIN – Andy Dalton – 21/28, 243 yards, 2 TD, INT
- IND – Andrew Luck – 39/53, 319 yards, 2 TD, INT

**Top rushers**

- CIN – Joe Mixon – 17 rusches, 95 yards, TD
- IND – Jordan Wilkins – 14 rushes, 40 yards

**Top receivers**

- CIN – A. J. Green – 6 receptions, 92 yards, TD
- IND – Jack Doyle – 7 receptions, 60 yards

The Bengals opened the 2018 NFL season in Indianapolis. After trading field goals in the first quarter, the Colts took the lead on Andrew Luck's first touchdown pass since Week 17 of the 2016 NFL season to TE Eric Ebron. After Indianapolis added another Adam Vinatieri field goal, Cincinnati trailed 13–3 in the second quarter before WR John Ross caught a 3-yard TD pass from Andy Dalton for his first career NFL catch and touchdown. The Colts took a 23–10 lead in the third quarter after a T. Y. Hilton TD catch, but the Bengals went on to score 17 unanswered points, including touchdowns by A. J. Green and Joe Mixon, and held a 27–23 lead with less than four minutes to go in the fourth quarter. Bengals safety Shawn Williams was ejected earlier in the game on an unnecessary roughness call for a helmet-to-helmet hit on Andrew Luck and was replaced in the secondary by Clayton Fejedelem. With the Colts driving to win the game late in the fourth, Fejedelem hit Colts TE Jack Doyle forcing a fumble and returned it 83-yards for a touchdown, sealing the victory for the Bengals.

The win snapped the Bengals' eight-game road losing streak against the Colts, beating them at Indianapolis for the first time since the 1997 season.

==== Week 2: vs. Baltimore Ravens ====
Week Two: Baltimore Ravens at Cincinnati Bengals – Game summary

| Quarter | 1 | 2 | 3 | 4 | Total |
|---|---|---|---|---|---|
| Ravens | 0 | 14 | 3 | 6 | **23** |
| **Bengals** | 14 | 14 | 0 | 6 | **34** |

at Paul Brown Stadium, Cincinnati, Ohio

- Date: September 13
- Game time: 8:20 pm. EDT
- Game weather: 82 °F (28 °C), clear
- Game attendance: 50,018
- Referee: Walt Anderson
- TV announcers (NFLN/WKRC): Joe Buck, Troy Aikman, Erin Andrews, Kristina Pink, and Mike Pereira
- Recap, Gamebook

Game information

**First quarter**

- CIN – A. J. Green 4-yard pass from Andy Dalton (Randy Bullock kick), 10:35. Bengals 7–0. **Drive: 4 plays, 16 yards, 1:38.**
- CIN – A. J. Green 32-yard pass from Andy Dalton (Randy Bullock kick), 6:33. Bengals 14–0. **Drive: 5 plays, 80 yards, 1:33.**

**Second quarter**

- CIN – A. J. Green 7-yard pass from Andy Dalton (Randy Bullock kick), 13:02. Bengals 21–0. **Drive: 12 plays, 72 yards, 5:53.**
- BAL – Javorius Allen 1-yard run (Justin Tucker kick), 8:20. Bengals 21–7. **Drive: 10 plays, 75 yards, 4:42.**
- CIN – Tyler Boyd 14-yard pass from Andy Dalton (Randy Bullock kick), 2:58. Bengals 28–7. **Drive: 12 plays, 78 yards, 5:22.**
- BAL – Mark Andrews 1-yard pass from Joe Flacco (Justin Tucker kick), 0:08. Bengals 28–14. **Drive: 7 plays, 81 yards, 0:54.**

**Third quarter**

- BAL – Justin Tucker 55-yard field goal, 12:35. Bengals 28–17. **Drive: 5 plays, 28 yards, 1:06.**

**Fourth quarter**

- BAL – John Brown 21-yard pass from Joe Flacco (pass failed), 9:35. Bengals 28–23. **Drive: 12 plays, 87 yards, 5:15.**
- CIN – Randy Bullock 28-yard field goal, 3:03. Bengals 31–23. **Drive: 10 plays, 65 yards, 6:36.**
- CIN – Randy Bullock 40-yard field goal, 2:29. Bengals 34–23. **Drive: 4 plays, 7 yards, 0:17.**

**Top passers**

- BAL – Joe Flacco – 32/55, 376 yards, 2 TD, 2 INT
- CIN – Andy Dalton – 24/42, 265 yards, 4 TD

**Top rushers**

- BAL – Alex Collins – 9 carries, 35 yards
- CIN – Joe Mixon – 21 carries, 84 yards

**Top receivers**

- BAL – John Brown – 4 receptions, 92 yards, TD
- CIN – Tyler Boyd – 6 receptions, 91 yards, TD

The Bengals played their division rival, the Baltimore Ravens, in their home opener on Thursday Night Football and started the night on fire. WR A. J. Green caught three touchdown passes in the first half to give the Bengals an early 21–0 lead. Dalton added another touchdown pass to WR Tyler Boyd, but the Ravens closed the cap with TE Mark Andrews hauling in a Joe Flacco touchdown pass to cut the Ravens deficit to 14 at halftime. After a Justin Tucker field goal closed the gap even further in the third quarter, Ravens WR John Brown caught a 21-yard touchdown pass from Flacco to get the Ravens within five with less than 10 minutes to go in the game. Cincinnati tacked on a field goal to increase the lead to eight with just under three minutes to go in the game. With the Ravens trying to tie the game, Bengals safety Shawn Williams got a strip-sack on Flacco and the Bengals recovered the fumble. Cincinnati added a 40-yard field goal by Randy Bullock to put the game out of reach and start the season 2-0 for the first time since 2015.

==== Week 3: at Carolina Panthers ====
Week Three: Cincinnati Bengals at Carolina Panthers – Game summary

| Quarter | 1 | 2 | 3 | 4 | Total |
|---|---|---|---|---|---|
| Bengals | 7 | 7 | 7 | 0 | **21** |
| **Panthers** | 7 | 14 | 7 | 3 | **31** |

at Bank of America Stadium, Charlotte, North Carolina

- Date: September 23
- Game time: 1:00 pm. EDT
- Game weather: 80 °F (27 °C), cloudy
- Game attendance: 72,161
- Referee: John Parry
- TV announcers (CBS): Kevin Harlan, Rich Gannon, and Steve Tasker
- Recap, Gamebook

Game information

**First quarter**

- CIN – Giovani Bernard 1-yard run (Randy Bullock kick), 7:40. Bengals 7–0. **Drive: 11 plays, 75 yards, 6:03.**
- CAR – Cam Newton 2-yard run (Graham Gano kick), 3:02. Tied 7–7. **Drive: 9 plays, 75 yards, 4:38.**

**Second quarter**

- CAR – Devin Funchess 4-yard pass from Cam Newton (Graham Gano kick), 12:03. Panthers 14–7. **Drive: 9 plays, 67 yards, 4:52.**
- CIN – C. J. Uzomah 1-yard pass from Andy Dalton (Randy Bullock kick), 6:59. Tied 14–14. **Drive: 12 plays, 75 yards, 5:04.**
- CAR – C. J. Anderson 24-yard pass from Cam Newton (Graham Gano kick), 2:47. Panthers 21–14. **Drive: 7 plays, 75 yards, 4:12.**

**Third quarter**

- CAR – Cam Newton 5-yard run (Graham Gano kick), 5:34. Panthers 28–14. **Drive: 6 plays, 26 yards, 3:53.**
- CIN – Tyler Boyd 27-yard pass from Andy Dalton (Randy Bullock kick), 2:53. Panthers 28–21. **Drive: 5 plays, 75 yards, 2:41.**

**Fourth quarter**

- CAR – Graham Gano 40-yard field goal, 1:11. Panthers 31–21. **Drive: 7 plays, 28 yards, 2:22.**

**Top passers**

- CIN – Andy Dalton – 29/46, 352 yards, 2 TD, 4 INT
- CAR – Cam Newton – 15/24, 150 yards, 2 TD

**Top rushers**

- CIN – Giovani Bernard – 12 carries, 61 yards, TD
- CAR – Christian McCaffrey – 28 carries, 184 yards

**Top receivers**

- CIN – Tyler Boyd – 6 receptions, 132 yards, TD
- CAR – Devin Funchess – 4 receptions, 67 yards, TD

The Bengals faced the Panthers in their second road game of the season and took an early lead on a Giovani Bernard TD run, but the Panthers answered back with a Cam Newton TD run. Later in the first quarter Andy Dalton threw his first interception of the day, a pass intended for John Ross, but it was intercepted by Donte Jackson. In the second quarter, WR Devin Funchess and RB C. J. Anderson both caught TD passes from Newton and Carolina took a 21–14 lead into the half. In the third, Dalton was picked off again by Efe Obada and a second Newton TD run extended the Panthers lead to 14. Cincinnati soon followed with a TD by WR Tyler Boyd decreasing the Panthers' lead to seven. With less than four minutes to go in the game, another Dalton pass intended for Ross was once again intercepted by Jackson. A Graham Gano field goal made the score 31–21 and in the last few seconds of the game Dalton threw a pass intended for Tyler Eifert in the end zone, but was picked by Luke Kuechly for Dalton's fourth interception of the game. The loss drops the Bengals to 2–1.

==== Week 4: at Atlanta Falcons ====
Week Four: Cincinnati Bengals at Atlanta Falcons – Game summary

| Quarter | 1 | 2 | 3 | 4 | Total |
|---|---|---|---|---|---|
| **Bengals** | 14 | 14 | 0 | 9 | **37** |
| Falcons | 7 | 17 | 3 | 9 | **36** |

at Mercedes-Benz Stadium, Atlanta, Georgia

- Date: September 30
- Game time: 1:00 pm. EDT
- Game weather: Played indoors (retractable roof closed)
- Game attendance: 71,985
- Referee: Shawn Smith
- TV announcers (CBS): Greg Gumbel, Trent Green, Bruce Arians, and Melanie Collins
- Recap, Gamebook

Game information

**First quarter**

- ATL – Ito Smith 7-yard run (Matt Bryant kick), 10:27. Falcons 7–0. **Drive: 8 plays, 50 yards, 4:43.**
- CIN – Tyler Eifert 15-yard pass from Andy Dalton (Randy Bullock kick), 7:23. Tied 7–7. **Drive: 5 plays, 67 yards, 3:04.**
- CIN – Giovani Bernard 10-yard run (Randy Bullock kick), 0:12. Bengals 14–7. **Drive: 8 plays, 51 yards, 3:29.**

**Second quarter**

- ATL – Logan Paulsen 17-yard pass from Matt Ryan (Matt Bryant kick), 11:03. Tied 14–14. **Drive 10 plays, 75 yards, 4:09.**
- CIN – John Ross 39-yard pass from Andy Dalton (Randy Bullock kick), 8:11. Bengals 21–14. **Drive: 5 plays, 75 yards, 2:52.**
- ATL – Calvin Ridley 11-yard pass from Matt Ryan (Matt Bryant), 2:55. Tied 21–21. **Drive: 10 plays, 79 yards, 5:16.**
- CIN – Giovani Bernard 1-yard run (Randy Bullock kick), 0:44. Bengals 28–21. **Drive: 6 plays, 75 yards, 2:11.**
- ATL – Matt Bryant 55-yard field goal, 0:00. Bengals 28–24. **Drive: 7 plays, 38 yards, 0:44.**

**Third quarter**

- ATL – Matt Bryant 28-yard field goal, 11:22. Bengals 28–27. **Drive: 4 plays, -2 yards, 1:46.**

**Fourth quarter**

- ATL – Calvin Ridley 30-yard pass from Matt Ryan (Two-point conversion failed), 14:25. Falcons 33–28. **Drive: 4 plays, 54 yards, 2:13.**
- CIN – Randy Bullock 36-yard field goal, 8:19. Falcons 33–31. **Drive: 11 plays, 34 yards, 6:06.**
- ATL – Matt Bryant 32-yard field goal, 4:15. Falcons 36–31. 'Drive: 11 plays, 61 yards, 4:04
- CIN A. J. Green 13-yard pass from Andy Dalton (Two-point conversion failed), 0:07. Bengals 37–36. **Drive: 16 plays, 75 yards, 4:08.**

**Top passers**

- CIN – Andy Dalton – 29/41, 337 yards, 3 TD, INT
- ATL – Matt Ryan – 29/39, 419 yards, 3 TD

**Top rushers**

- CIN – Giovani Bernard – 15 rushes, 69 yards, 2 TD
- ATL – Tevin Coleman – 14 rushes, 51 yards

**Top receivers**

- CIN – Tyler Boyd – 11 receptions, 100 yards
- ATL – Julio Jones – 9 receptions, 173 yards

For the second-straight week, the Bengals were on the road against an opponent from the NFC South, the Atlanta Falcons. The scoring started early as Falcons rookie RB Ito Smith scored his first NFL TD on the opening possession of the game. The Bengals started scoring some points of their own in the first quarter with a 15-yard TD pass from Andy Dalton to Tyler Eifert and a Giovani Bernard TD run to give the Bengals a 14–7 lead after one. Points continued to be put on the board in the second quarter with TE Logan Paulsen hauling in a TD pass from Matt Ryan, but Cincinnati answered quickly with John Ross' second TD of the season. Matt Ryan's second TD pass of the game to Calvin Ridley tied the game and the Bengals quickly regained the lead on Giovani Bernard's second TD run. Atlanta was able to get in field goal range at the end of the half and Matt Bryant kicked a 55-yard field goal to put the score at 28–24 in favor of the Bengals. The scoring slowed in the third quarter with a 28-yard Matt Bryant field goal being the only points added to the scoreboard, but the Bengals lost TE Tyler Eifert to a broken ankle. With the Bengals holding a 28–27 lead going into the fourth quarter, WR Calvin Ridley scored his second TD of the game to finally give the Falcons the lead, 33–28. Cincinnati and Atlanta then traded field goals to give the Falcons a 36–31 advantage with just over four minutes to go in the game. QB Andy Dalton led a 16 play, 75-yard drive, including two conversions on fourth down, that ended with a 13-yard TD pass to A. J. Green with seven seconds remaining on the clock. The Bengals failed on their two-point conversion, but kept the Falcons from scoring in the final seconds to improve to 3–1.

==== Week 5: vs. Miami Dolphins ====
Week Five: Miami Dolphins at Cincinnati Bengals – Game summary

| Quarter | 1 | 2 | 3 | 4 | Total |
|---|---|---|---|---|---|
| Dolphins | 0 | 14 | 3 | 0 | **17** |
| **Bengals** | 0 | 0 | 3 | 24 | **27** |

at Paul Brown Stadium, Cincinnati, Ohio

- Date: October 7
- Game time: 1:00 pm. EDT
- Game weather: 82 °F (28 °C), mostly sunny
- Game attendance: 52,708
- Referee: Craig Wrolstad
- TV announcers (CBS): Kevin Harlan, Rich Gannon, and Steve Tasker
- Recap, Gamebook

Game information

**First quarter**

- No scoring plays.

**Second quarter**

- MIA – Kenyan Drake 22-yard pass from Ryan Tannehill (Jason Sanders kick), 7:22. Dolphins 7–0. **Drive: 11 plays, 95 yards, 6:08.**
- MIA – Jakeem Grant 71-yard punt return (Jason Sanders kick), 0:23. Dolphins 14–0.

**Third quarter**

- MIA – Jason Sanders 42-yard field goal, 9:25. Dolphins 17–0. **Drive: 6 plays, 28 yards, 3:25.**
- CIN – Randy Bullock 51-yard field goal, 5:07. Dolphins 17–3. **Drive: 8 plays, 42 yards, 4:18.**

**Fourth quarter**

- CIN – Joe Mixon 18-yard pass from Andy Dalton (Randy Bullock kick), 14:54. Dolphins 17–10. **Drive: 8 plays, 71 yards, 3:30.**
- CIN – Michael Johnson 22-yard interception return (Randy Bullock kick), 11:43. Tied 17–17.
- CIN – Randy Bullock 20-yard field goal, 3:30. Bengals 20–17. **Drive: 9 plays, 62 yards, 4:00.**
- CIN – Sam Hubbard 19-yard fumble return (Randy Bullock kick), 2:37. Bengals 27–17.

**Top passers**

- MIA – Ryan Tannehill – 20/35, 185 yards, 1 TD, 2 INT
- CIN – Andy Dalton – 20/30, 248 yards, 1 TD, 1 INT

**Top rushers**

- MIA – Frank Gore – 12 carries, 63 yards
- CIN – Joe Mixon – 22 carries, 93 yards

**Top receivers**

- MIA – Kenyan Drake – 7 receptions, 69 yards, 1 TD
- CIN – A. J. Green – 6 receptions, 112 yards

In the first Sunday home game of the season, the Bengals (3–1) took on the Miami Dolphins (3–1) and the first score of the game didn't come until midway through the second quarter. A Kenyan Drake TD catch from Ryan Tannehill gave the Dolphins a 7–0 lead and then a punt return by Jakeem Grant put the Dolphins up 14–0 at the half. The Bengals and Dolphins traded field goals in the third quarter as Miami took a 17–3 lead into the fourth quarter. The Bengals cut the deficit to 7 after Joe Mixon caught a TD pass from QB Andy Dalton, who threw the ball up as he was being sacked. Then the Bengals defense took over with DE Michael Johnson intercepting a Ryan Tannehill pass, one that hit his own offensive lineman, and took it 22-yards for a TD. After a Randy Bullock field goal and with the Bengals leading 20–17, DE Carlos Dunlap had a strip-sack on Tannehill and the fumble was recovered by rookie DE Sam Hubbard, who returned 19-yards for a TD. The Bengals would hold on to win 27–17 and remain in first place in the AFC North with a 4–1 record.

==== Week 6: vs. Pittsburgh Steelers ====
Week Six: Pittsburgh Steelers at Cincinnati Bengals – Game summary

| Quarter | 1 | 2 | 3 | 4 | Total |
|---|---|---|---|---|---|
| **Steelers** | 0 | 14 | 3 | 11 | **28** |
| Bengals | 7 | 7 | 0 | 7 | **21** |

at Paul Brown Stadium, Cincinnati, Ohio

- Date: October 14
- Game time: 1:00 pm. EDT
- Game weather: 51 °F (11 °C), mostly cloudy
- Game attendance: 60,594
- Referee: Clete Blakeman
- TV announcers (CBS): Ian Eagle, Dan Fouts, and Evan Washburn
- Recap, Gamebook

Game information

**First quarter**

- CIN – Tyler Boyd 2-yard pass from Andy Dalton (Randy Bullock kick), 4:36. Bengals 7–0. **Drive: 11 plays, 54 yards, 4:24.**

**Second quarter**

- PIT – James Conner 1-yard run (Chris Boswell kick), 14:33. Tied 7–7. **Drive: 10 plays, 75 yards, 5:03.**
- PIT – James Conner 1-yard run (Chris Boswell kick), 1:07. Steelers 14–7. **Drive: 8 plays, 75 yards, 4:18.**
- CIN – Tyler Boyd 14-yard pass from Andy Dalton (Randy Bullock kick), 0:19. Tied 14–14. **Drive: 5 plays, 44 yards, 0:48.**

**Third quarter**

- PIT – Chris Boswell 21-yard field goal, 6:53. Steelers 17–14. **Drive: 12 plays, 85 yards, 6:21.**

**Fourth quarter**

- PIT – Chris Boswell 24-yard field goal, 3:32. Steelers 20–14. **Drive: 10 plays, 82 yards, 5:47.**
- CIN – Joe Mixon 4-yard run (Randy Bullock kick), 1:18. Bengals 21–20. **Drive: 9 plays, 75 yards, 2:14.**
- PIT – Antonio Brown 31-yard pass from Ben Roethlisberger (Ben Roethlisberger pass to JuJu Smith-Schuster for two-point conversion), 0:10. Steelers 28–21. **Drive: 7 plays, 77 yards, 1:08.**

**Top passers**

- PIT – Ben Roethlisberger – 32/46, 369 yards, 1 TD
- CIN – Andy Dalton – 26/42, 229 yards, 2 TD

**Top rushers**

- PIT – James Conner – 19 carries, 111 yards, 2 TD
- CIN – Joe Mixon – 11 carries, 64 yards, 1 TD

**Top receivers**

- PIT – JuJu Smith-Schuster – 7 receptions, 111 yards
- CIN – A. J. Green – 7 receptions, 85 yards

After scoring 27 unanswered points to get the win last week, the Bengals hosted the arch rival Pittsburgh Steelers for the first of two meeting this season. The Bengals scored first when Andy Dalton found Tyler Boyd on a 2-yard pass to make it 7–0 for the only points of the first quarter. In the second quarter, the Steelers took the lead when James Conner ran for two 1-yard touchdowns to make it 7–7 and then 14–7. The Bengals managed to tie the game up at halftime when Dalton found Boyd again on a 14-yard pass to make it 14–14. In the third quarter, the Steelers regained the lead when Chris Boswell kicked a 21-yard field goal to make it 17–14. The Steelers would increase their lead in the fourth quarter when Boswell kicked another field goal from 24 yards out to make it 20–14. The Bengals drove down the field and took the lead when Joe Mixon ran for a 4-yard touchdown to make it 21–20 with just over a minute to go in the game. The Steelers completed the comeback though when Ben Roethlisberger found Antonio Brown on a 31-yard pass (with a successful 2-point conversion) to make the final score 28–21. The Bengals fall to 4–2 and are now tied with the Baltimore Ravens for the AFC North lead. The Steelers now sit only a half game back.

==== Week 7: at Kansas City Chiefs ====
Week Seven: Cincinnati Bengals at Kansas City Chiefs – Game summary

| Quarter | 1 | 2 | 3 | 4 | Total |
|---|---|---|---|---|---|
| Bengals | 0 | 7 | 3 | 0 | **10** |
| **Chiefs** | 7 | 17 | 14 | 7 | **45** |

at Arrowhead Stadium, Kansas City, Missouri

- Date: October 21
- Game time: 8:20 pm. EDT/7:20 p.m. CDT
- Game weather: 59 °F (15 °C), clear
- Game attendance: 75,676
- Referee: Bill Vinovich
- TV announcers (NBC): Al Michaels, Cris Collinsworth, Michele Tafoya, and Terry McAulay
- Recap, Gamebook

Game information

**First quarter**

- KC – Kareem Hunt 6-yard pass from Patrick Mahomes (Harrison Butker kick), 8:08. Chiefs 7–0. **Drive: 10 plays, 95 yards, 5:18.**

**Second quarter**

- KC – Kareem Hunt 15-yard pass from Patrick Mahomes (Harrison Butker kick), 13:18. Chiefs 14–0. **Drive: 4 plays, 32 yards, 1:33.**
- CIN – C. J. Uzomah 4-yard pass from Andy Dalton (Randy Bullock kick), 7:25. Chiefs 14–7. **Drive: 11 plays, 77 yards, 5:53.**
- KC – Demetrius Harris 17-yard pass from Patrick Mahomes (Harrison Butker kick), 1:55. Chiefs 21–7. **Drive: 10 plays, 77 yards, 5:30.**
- KC – Harrison Butker 26-yard field goal, 0:08. Chiefs 24–7. **Drive: 8 plays, 72 yards, 1:05.**

**Third quarter**

- KC – Kareem Hunt 2-yard run (Harrison Butker kick), 11:19. Chiefs 31–7. **Drive: 7 plays, 75 yards, 3:41.**
- KC – Ron Parker 33-yard interception return, 11:10. Chiefs 38–7. **Drive: 1 play, 0 yards, 0:09.**
- CIN – Randy Bullock 33-yard field goal, 6:16. Chiefs 38–10. **Drive: 10 plays, 60 yards, 4:54.**

**Fourth quarter**

- KC – Tyreek Hill 3-yard pass from Patrick Mahomes (Harrison Butker kick), 12:50. Chiefs 45–10. **Drive: 12 plays, 82 yards, 5:09.**

**Top passers**

- CIN – Andy Dalton – 15/29, 148 yards, TD, INT
- KC – Patrick Mahomes – 28/39, 358 yards, 4 TD, INT

**Top rushers**

- CIN – Joe Mixon – 13 carries, 50 yards
- KC – Kareem Hunt – 15 carries, 86 yards, TD

**Top receivers**

- CIN – A. J. Green – 7 receptions, 117 yards
- KC – Travis Kelce – 5 receptions, 95 yards

NBC flexed this game from 1:00 pm. ET to primetime Sunday night and the Bengals came in with just a 1–8 record on Sunday Night under head coach Marvin Lewis. Kansas City took their opening drive 95-yards ending with a Kareem Hunt TD catch from QB Patrick Mahomes. Mahomes found Hunt again at the start of the second quarter to give the Chiefs a 14–0 lead. Andy Dalton and the Bengals responded with a 77-yard drive that ended with a TD catch by TE C. J. Uzomah. The Bengals defense continued to struggle in stopping the Chiefs explosive offense though and Kansas City scored 10 more points to take a 24–7 lead at halftime. The Bengals deficit grew in the third quarter with Kareem Hunt rushing for a TD and then Dalton threw a pick-six on the Bengals first offensive play of the second half to put the Chiefs ahead 38–7. Randy Bullock added a field goal to cut the deficit to 28, but Tyreek Hill's TD catch at the beginning of the fourth quarter put the Chiefs back up 35 where the score stood for the rest of the game. The Cincinnati defense gave up a season high 45 points and 551-yards of offense as the Bengals fell out of first place in the AFC North. Cincinnati is now 1–9 on Sunday night under Lewis while falling to 4–3 on the season.

==== Week 8: vs. Tampa Bay Buccaneers ====
Week Eight: Tampa Bay Buccaneers at Cincinnati Bengals – Game summary

| Quarter | 1 | 2 | 3 | 4 | Total |
|---|---|---|---|---|---|
| Buccaneers | 0 | 9 | 7 | 18 | **34** |
| **Bengals** | 7 | 20 | 7 | 3 | **37** |

at Paul Brown Stadium, Cincinnati, Ohio

- Date: October 28
- Game time: 1:00 pm. EDT
- Game weather: 55 °F (13 °C), cloudy
- Game attendance: 45,134
- Referee: Alex Kemp
- TV announcers (Fox): Chris Myers, Daryl Johnston, and Laura Okmin
- Recap, Gamebook

Game information

**First quarter**

- CIN – Joe Mixon 1-yard run (Randy Bullock kick), 3:04. Bengals 7–0. **Drive: 4 plays, 63 yards, 1:22.**

**Second quarter**

- CIN – Tyler Boyd 9-yard pass from Andy Dalton (Randy Bullock kick), 10:04. Bengals 14–0. **Drive: 12 plays, 58 yards, 4:57.**
- CIN – Joe Mixon 8-yard run (Randy Bullock kick), 5:07. Bengals 21–0. **Drive: 4 plays, 68 yards, 1:31.**
- TB – DeSean Jackson 60-yard pass from Jameis Winston (kick failed), 4:36. Bengals 21–6. **Drive: 2 plays, 75 yards, 0:31.**
- CIN – A. J. Green 17-yard pass from Andy Dalton (kick failed), 2:34. Bengals 27–6. **Drive: 6 plays, 75 yards, 2:02.**
- TB – Chandler Catanzaro 25-yard field goal, 0:03. Bengals 27–9. **Drive: 14 plays, 53 yards, 2:31.**

**Third quarter**

- TB – Peyton Barber 1-yard run (Chandler Catanzaro kick), 9:18. Bengals 27–16. **Drive: 11 plays, 75 yards, 5:42.**
- CIN – Jessie Bates 21-yard interception return (Randy Bullock kick), 2:10. Bengals 34–16.

**Fourth quarter**

- TB – Chandler Catanzaro 38-yard field goal, 12:54. Bengals 34–19. **Drive: 8 plays, 55 yards, 4:16.**
- TB – Mike Evans 72-yard pass from Ryan Fitzpatrick (Chandler Catanzaro kick), 9:57. Bengals 34–26. **Drive: 2 plays, 68 yards, 1:19.**
- TB – O. J. Howard 18-yard pass from Ryan Fitzpatrick (Ryan Fitzpatrick-Chris Godwin pass), 1:05. Tied 34–34. **Drive: 10 plays, 88 yards, 2:11.**
- CIN – Randy Bullock 44-yard field goal, 0:00. Bengals 37–34. **Drive: 8 plays, 50 yards, 1:05.**

**Top passers**

- TB – Jameis Winston – 18/35, 276 yards, 1 TD, 4 INT
- CIN – Andy Dalton – 21/34, 280 yards, 2 TD

**Top rushers**

- TB – Peyton Barber – 19 carries, 85 yards, 1 TD
- CIN – Joe Mixon – 21 carries, 123 yards, 2 TD

**Top receivers**

- TB – Mike Evans – 6 receptions, 179 yards, 1 TD
- CIN – Tyler Boyd – 9 receptions, 138 yards, 1 TD

The Bengals started off strong with two TD runs by Joe Mixon and a TD catch from Tyler Boyd to go up 21–0 with just over five minutes to go in the second quarter. The Bucs answered with a 60-yard pass to DeSean Jackson, but the Bengals answered right back with a 17–yard pass to A. J. Green. Tampa Bay added a field goal at the end of the half to trail 27–9. After Bucs QB Jameis Winston threw his fourth interception of the game, which was returned 21-yards for a TD by Jessie Bates, he was benched and Ryan Fitzpatrick took over for Tampa Bay. Fitzpatrick would orchestrate an 18-point comeback by leading drives that ended in a field goal and TD passes to Mike Evans and O.J. Howard. Fitzpatrick then connected with Chris Godwin on a two-point conversion to tie the game at 34 with 1:05 remaining on the clock. Andy Dalton lead an eight play, 50-yard drive that ended with a 44-yard field goal by Randy Bullock as time expired to win the game for the Bengals. Having held on for the victory, the Bengals have now recorded at least one victory at Paul Brown Stadium against each of the 31 other franchises.

The team improved to 5–3 as they head into their bye week.

==== Week 10: vs. New Orleans Saints ====
Week Ten: New Orleans Saints at Cincinnati Bengals – Game summary

| Quarter | 1 | 2 | 3 | 4 | Total |
|---|---|---|---|---|---|
| **Saints** | 7 | 28 | 10 | 6 | **51** |
| Bengals | 7 | 0 | 0 | 7 | **14** |

at Paul Brown Stadium, Cincinnati, Ohio

- Date: November 11
- Game time: 1:00 pm. EST
- Game weather: 39 °F (4 °C), mostly sunny
- Game attendance: 52,492
- Referee: Tony Corrente
- TV announcers (Fox): Kevin Burkhardt, Charles Davis, and Pam Oliver
- Recap, Gamebook

Game information

First quarter

- NO – Michael Thomas 7-yard pass from Drew Brees (Wil Lutz kick), 6:30. Saints 7–0. **Drive: 15 plays, 75 yards, 8:30.**
- CIN – John Ross 2-yard pass from Andy Dalton (Randy Bullock kick), 1:56. Tied 7–7. **Drive: 8 plays, 75 yards, 4:34.**

Second quarter

- NO – Mark Ingram II 28-yard pass from Drew Brees (Wil Lutz kick), 13:33. Saints 14–7. **Drive: 6 plays, 75 yards, 3:23.**
- NO – Alvin Kamara 4-yard run (Wil Lutz kick), 5:34. Saints 21–7. **Drive: 9 plays, 90 yards, 4:54.**
- NO – Alvin Kamara 1-yard run (Wil Lutz kick), 1:22. Saints 28–7. **Drive: 9 plays, 60 yards, 2:40.**
- NO – Michael Thomas 17-yard pass from Drew Brees (Wil Lutz kick), 0:02. Saints 35–7. **Drive: 1 plays, 17 yards, 0:06.**

Third quarter

- NO – Wil Lutz 29-yard field goal, 9:04. Saints 38–7. **Drive: 8 plays, 61 yards, 4:08.**
- NO – Drew Brees 1-yard run (Wil Lutz kick), 2:25. Saints 45–7. **Drive: 8 plays, 62 yards, 3:56.**

Fourth quarter

- NO – Wil Lutz 42-yard field goal, 10:41. Saints 48–7. **Drive: 9 plays, 35 yards, 5:52.**
- NO – Wil Lutz 41-yard field goal, 7:17. Saints 51–7. **Drive: 4 plays, 4 yards, 1:35.**
- CIN – Jeff Driskel 27-yard run (Randy Bullock kick), 4:42. Saints 51–14. **Drive: 6 plays, 75 yards, 2:35.**

**Top passers**

- NO – Drew Brees – 22/25, 265 yards, 3 TD
- CIN – Andy Dalton – 12/20, 153 yards, TD, 2 INT

**Top rushers**

- NO – Mark Ingram II – 13 carries, 104 yards
- CIN – Joe Mixon – 11 carries, 61 yards

**Top receivers**

- NO – Michael Thomas – 8 receptions, 70 yards, 2 TD
- CIN – Tyler Boyd – 3 receptions, 65 yards

After a tough win at home over the Bucs, the Bengals stayed home for a game against the Saints. In the first quarter, the Saints score first when Drew Brees found Michael Thomas a 7-yard pass to make it 7–0. The Bengals would tie it up as Andy Dalton found John Ross on a 2-yard pass to make it 7-7. In the second quarter, the Saints' offense exploded as they scored 4 touchdowns: Brees found Mark Ingram II on a 28-yard pass. This would be followed up by Alvin Kamara running for 2 touchdowns: from 4 and 1 yards out. Finally, Brees found Thomas again on a 17-yard pass to make it 14–7, 21–7, 28–7, and then 35–7 at halftime. In the third quarter, the Saints continued to dominate as Wil Lutz kicked a 29-yard field goal to make it 38–7. This would be followed by Brees running for a 1-yard touchdown to make it 45–7. Lutz then put up 2 more field goals in the fourth quarter from 42 and 41 yards out to make it 48-7 and then 51–7. The Bengals scored later on in the quarter when backup QB Jeff Driskel ran for a 27-yard touchdown to make the final score 51–14.

With the loss, the Bengals fell to 5–4.

==== Week 11: at Baltimore Ravens ====
Week Eleven: Cincinnati Bengals at Baltimore Ravens – Game summary

| Quarter | 1 | 2 | 3 | 4 | Total |
|---|---|---|---|---|---|
| Bengals | 0 | 7 | 14 | 0 | **21** |
| **Ravens** | 7 | 6 | 8 | 3 | **24** |

at M&T Bank Stadium, Baltimore, Maryland

- Date: November 18
- Game time: 1:00 pm. EST
- Game weather: 48 °F (9 °C), cloudy
- Game attendance: 70,077
- Referee: Walt Coleman
- TV announcers (CBS): Kevin Harlan, Rich Gannon, and Steve Tasker
- Recap, Gamebook

Game information

**First quarter**

- BAL – Alex Collins 7-yard rush (Justin Tucker kick), 7:31. Ravens 7–0. **Drive: 11 plays, 75 yards, 5:23.**

**Second quarter**

- CIN – Joe Mixon 1-yard rush (Randy Bullock kick), 12:57. Tied 7–7. **Drive: 6 plays, 57 yards, 2:06.**
- BAL – Justin Tucker 28-yard field goal, 1:46. Ravens 10–7. **Drive: 7 plays, 34 yards, 3:16.**
- BAL – Justin Tucker 56-yard field goal, 0:00. Ravens 13–7. **Drive: 4 plays, 27 yards, 0:22.**

**Third quarter**

- CIN – Matt Lengel 4-yard pass from Andy Dalton (Randy Bullock kick), 11:46. Bengals 14–13. **Drive: 4 plays, 32 yards, 1:50.**
- CIN – John Ross 22-yard pass from Andy Dalton (Randy Bullock kick), 5:45. Bengals 21–13. **Drive: 7 plays, 45 yards, 3:30.**
- BAL – Gus Edwards 11-yard rush (Gus Edwards run), 1:03. Tied 21–21. **Drive: 10 plays, 80 yards, 4:42.**

**Fourth quarter**

- BAL – Justin Tucker 24-yard field goal, 8:12. Ravens 24–21. **Drive: 13 plays, 55 yards, 6:56.**

**Top passers**

- CIN – Andy Dalton – 19/36, 211 yards, 2 TD
- BAL – Lamar Jackson – 13/19, 150 yards, INT

**Top rushers**

- CIN – Andy Dalton – 2 carries, 29 yards
- BAL – Lamar Jackson – 27 carries, 117 yards

**Top receivers**

- CIN – Tyler Boyd – 4 receptions, 71 yards
- BAL – Willie Snead IV – 5 receptions, 51 yards

After a horrifying loss at home, the Bengals traveled to Baltimore for Game 2 against the Ravens. In the first quarter, the Ravens made it 7–0 after Alex Collins ran for a 7-yard touchdown for the only score. The Bengals however would tie the game up in the second quarter when Joe Mixon ran for a 1-yard touchdown to make it 7-7. Justin Tucker would give his Ravens the lead back when he scored 2 field goals from 28 and 56 yards out to make it 10-7 and then 13–7 at halftime. In the third quarter, the Bengals retook the lead when Andy Dalton found Matt Lengel on a 4-yard pass to make it 14–13. They would increase their lead when Dalton threw another pass: A 22-yard pass to John Ross to make it 21–13. The Ravens however, managed to tie the game back up when Gus Edwards ran for an 11-yard touchdown (with a successful 2-point conversion) to make it 21-21. In the fourth quarter, Tucker kicked his third field goal of the day: A 24-yard field goal to make it 24–21. After that, the Ravens' defense was able to shut down the Bengals' offense and the Ravens held on for the win.

With the loss, the Bengals fell to 5-5.

==== Week 12: vs. Cleveland Browns ====
Week Twelve: Cleveland Browns at Cincinnati Bengals – Game summary

| Quarter | 1 | 2 | 3 | 4 | Total |
|---|---|---|---|---|---|
| **Browns** | 14 | 14 | 7 | 0 | **35** |
| Bengals | 0 | 7 | 7 | 6 | **20** |

at Paul Brown Stadium, Cincinnati, Ohio

- Date: November 25
- Game time: 1:00 pm. EST
- Game weather: 44 °F (7 °C), cloudy
- Game attendance: 56,122
- Referee: Jerome Boger
- TV announcers (CBS): Kevin Harlan, Rich Gannon, and Steve Tasker
- Recap, Gamebook

Game information

**First quarter**

- CLE – Nick Chubb 1-yard rush (Greg Joseph kick), 9:11. Browns 7–0. **Drive: 10 plays, 78 yards, 5:49.**
- CLE – Antonio Callaway 13-yard pass from Baker Mayfield (Greg Joseph kick), 1:37. Browns 14–0. **Drive: 4 plays, 56 yards, 1:24.**

**Second quarter**

- CLE – David Njoku 6-yard pass from Baker Mayfield (Greg Joseph kick), 9:18. Browns 21–0. **Drive: 12 plays, 96 yards, 5:47.**
- CLE – Nick Chubb 14-yard pass from Baker Mayfield (Greg Joseph kick), 2:25. Browns 28–0. **Drive: 11 plays, 59 yards, 6:44.**
- CIN – John Ross 2-yard pass from Andy Dalton (Randy Bullock kick), 0:32. Browns 28–7. **Drive: 8 plays, 75 yards, 1:53.**

**Third quarter**

- CLE – Darren Fells 6-yard pass from Baker Mayfield (Greg Joseph kick), 12:56. Browns 35–7. **Drive: 2 plays, 7 yards, 0:45.**
- CIN – Tyler Boyd 28-yard pass from Jeff Driskel (Randy Bullock kick), 4:56. Browns 35–14. **Drive: 9 plays, 75 yards, 5:39.**

**Fourth quarter**

- CIN – Jeff Driskel 2-yard rush (kick failed), 7:57. Browns 35–20. **Drive: 14 plays, 94 yards, 6:54.**

**Top passers**

- CLE – Baker Mayfield – 19/26, 258 yards, 4 TD
- CIN – Jeff Driskel – 17/29, 155 yards, 1 TD

**Top rushers**

- CLE – Nick Chubb – 28 carries, 84 yards, 1 TD
- CIN – Joe Mixon – 14 carries, 89 yards

**Top receivers**

- CLE – David Njoku – 5 receptions, 63 yards, 1 TD
- CIN – Tyler Boyd – 7 receptions, 85 yards, 1 TD

With their 7-game winning streak against the Browns snapped, the Bengals fell to 5–6. Making matters worse, quarterback Andy Dalton was injured in the third quarter after be tried to recover a fumble. Despite trailing 35–7 in the third quarter, the Bengals made it interesting late, but could not complete the comeback under backup Jeff Driskel. It was later revealed that Dalton would miss the remainder of the season with a broken thumb, ironically the same thumb he broke a few years earlier.

==== Week 13: vs. Denver Broncos ====
Week Thirteen: Denver Broncos at Cincinnati Bengals – Game summary

| Quarter | 1 | 2 | 3 | 4 | Total |
|---|---|---|---|---|---|
| **Broncos** | 0 | 7 | 14 | 3 | **24** |
| Bengals | 0 | 3 | 7 | 0 | **10** |

at Paul Brown Stadium, Cincinnati, Ohio

- Date: December 2
- Game time: 1:00 pm. EST
- Game weather: 63 °F (17 °C), sunny
- Game attendance: 44,392
- Referee: Ronald Torbert
- TV announcers (CBS): Spero Dedes and Adam Archuleta
- Recap, Gamebook

Game information

**First quarter**

- No scoring plays.

**Second quarter**

- DEN – Phillip Lindsay 6-yard run (Brandon McManus kick), 1:56. Broncos 7–0. **Drive: 8 plays, 55 yards, 3:01.**
- CIN – Randy Bullock 35-yard field goal, 0:12. Broncos 7–3. **Drive: 12 plays, 58 yards, 1:44.**

**Third quarter**

- DEN – Courtland Sutton 30-yard pass from Case Keenum (Brandon McManus kick), 11:27. Broncos 14–3. **Drive: 2 plays, 33 yards, 0:40.**
- DEN – Phillip Lindsay 65-yard run (Brandon McManus kick), 7:35. Broncos 21–3. **Drive: 4 plays, 85 yards, 2:01.**
- CIN – Cody Core 30-yard pass from Jeff Driskel (Randy Bullock kick), 2:45. Broncos 21–10. **Drive: 8 plays, 75 yards, 4:50.**

**Fourth quarter**

- DEN – Brandon McManus 29-yard field goal, 0:23. Broncos 24–10. **Drive: 4 plays, 7 yards, 2:16.**

**Top passers**

- DEN – Case Keenum – 12/21, 151 yards, TD
- CIN – Jeff Driskel – 25/38, 236 yards, TD, INT

**Top rushers**

- DEN – Phillip Lindsay – 19 rushes, 157 yards, 2 TD
- CIN – Joe Mixon – 12 rushes, 82 yards

**Top receivers**

- DEN – Courtland Sutton – 4 receptions, 85 yards, TD
- CIN – Tyler Boyd – 6 receptions, 97 yards

With the loss, the Bengals fell to 5–7. Making matters even worse than the week before, star receiver AJ Green was injured in the second quarter and had to be helped off by a cart. He was seen later slamming his helmet to the ground and screaming. It was later revealed that he would miss the rest of the season with a broken toe.

==== Week 14: at Los Angeles Chargers ====
Week Fourteen: Cincinnati Bengals at Los Angeles Chargers – Game summary

| Quarter | 1 | 2 | 3 | 4 | Total |
|---|---|---|---|---|---|
| Bengals | 3 | 9 | 0 | 9 | **21** |
| **Chargers** | 7 | 10 | 3 | 6 | **26** |

at StubHub Center, Carson, California

- Date: December 9
- Game time: 4:05 pm. EST/1:05 p.m. PST
- Game weather: 71 °F (22 °C), clear
- Game attendance: 25,358
- Referee: John Hussey
- TV announcers (CBS): Greg Gumbel, Trent Green, Bruce Arians, and Melanie Collins
- Recap, Gamebook

Game information

**First quarter**

- LAC – Keenan Allen 14-yard pass from Philip Rivers (Michael Badgley kick), 11:39. Chargers 7–0. **Drive: 6 plays, 75 yards, 3:21.**
- CIN – Randy Bullock 47-yard field goal, 6:23. Chargers 7–3. **Drive: 9 plays, 51 yards, 5:16.**

**Second quarter**

- LAC – Austin Ekeler 5-yard rush (Michael Badgley kick), 14:51. Chargers 14–3. **Drive: 13 plays, 75 yards, 6:32.**
- CIN – Randy Bullock 23-yard field goal, 5:01. Chargers 14–6. **Drive: 10 plays, 41 yards, 5:21.**
- CIN – John Ross 6-yard pass from Jeff Driskel (pass failed), 0:20. Chargers 14–12. **Drive: 5 plays, 35 yards, 1:15.**
- LAC – Michael Badgley 59-yard field goal, 0:00. Chargers 17–12. **Drive: 3 plays, 27 yards, 0:20.**

**Third quarter**

- LAC – Michael Badgley 31-yard field goal, 7:38. Chargers 20–12. **Drive: 11 plays, 22 yards, 5:06.**

**Fourth quarter**

- CIN – Randy Bullock 46-yard field goal, 12:12. Chargers 20–15. **Drive: 8 plays, 33 yards, 3:48.**
- LAC – Michael Badgley 32-yard field goal, 7:45. Chargers 23–15. **Drive: 8 plays, 61 yards, 4:27.**
- CIN – Joe Mixon 1-yard rush (pass failed), 1:50. Chargers 23–21. **Drive: 11 plays, 79 yards, 5:55.**
- LAC – Michael Badgley 45-yard field goal, 0:49. Chargers 26–21. **Drive: 4 plays, 7 yards, 1:01.**

**Top passers**

- CIN – Jeff Driskel – 18/27, 170 yards, 1 TD
- LAC – Philip Rivers – 19/29, 220 yards, 1 TD

**Top rushers**

- CIN – Joe Mixon – 26 carries, 111 yards, 1 TD
- LAC – Austin Ekeler – 15 carries, 66 yards, 1 TD

**Top receivers**

- CIN – Tyler Boyd – 3 receptions, 52 yards
- LAC – Keenan Allen – 5 receptions, 78 yards, 1 TD

With the loss, the Bengals dropped to 5–8. The team is also guaranteed their third straight non-winning season. They would 3-peat this process for the first time since the 2006–08 seasons.

==== Week 15: vs. Oakland Raiders ====
Week Fifteen: Oakland Raiders at Cincinnati Bengals – Game summary

| Quarter | 1 | 2 | 3 | 4 | Total |
|---|---|---|---|---|---|
| Raiders | 0 | 7 | 6 | 3 | **16** |
| **Bengals** | 7 | 13 | 0 | 10 | **30** |

at Paul Brown Stadium, Cincinnati, Ohio

- Date: December 16
- Game time: 1:00 pm. EST
- Game weather: 43 °F (6 °C), overcast
- Game attendance: 44,568
- Referee: Alex Kemp
- TV announcers (CBS): Andrew Catalon and James Lofton
- Recap, Gamebook

Game information

**First quarter**

- CIN – Tyler Boyd 7-yard pass from Jeff Driskel (Randy Bullock kick), 3:00. Bengals 7–0. **Drive: 9 plays, 45 yards, 4:42.**

**Second quarter**

- CIN – Joe Mixon 1-yard run (Randy Bullock kick), 10:17. Bengals 14–0. **Drive: 12 plays, 90 yards, 4:53.**
- CIN – Randy Bullock 34-yard field goal, 6:41. Bengals 17–0. **Drive: 7 plays, 18 yards, 2:48.**
- OAK – Lee Smith 1-yard pass from Derek Carr (Daniel Carlson kick), 3:48. Bengals 17–7. **Drive: 5 plays, 75 yards, 2:53.**
- CIN – Randy Bullock 38-yard field goal. Bengals 20–7. **Drive: 7 plays, 26 yards, 2:09.**

**Third quarter**

- OAK – Daniel Carlson 50-yard field goal, 6:27. Bengals 20–10. **Drive: 10 plays, 57 yards, 5:46.**
- OAK – Daniel Carlson 27-yard field goal, 2:38. Bengals 20–13. **Drive: 6 plays, 46 yards, 2:44.**

**Fourth quarter**

- CIN – Randy Bullock 23-yard field goal, 10:45. Bengals 23–13. **Drive: 14 plays, 71 yards, 6:53.**
- OAK – Daniel Carlson 40-yard field goal, 5:05. Bengals 23–16. **Drive: 6 plays, 31 yards, 2:00.**
- CIN – Joe Mixon 15-yard run (Randy Bullock kick), 4:04. Bengals 30–16. **Drive: 2 plays, 21 yards, 1:01.**

**Top passers**

- OAK – Derek Carr – 21/38, 263 yards, 1 TD
- CIN – Jeff Driskel – 14/33, 130 yards, 1 TD, 1 INT

**Top rushers**

- OAK – Doug Martin – 9 carries, 39 yards
- CIN – Joe Mixon – 27 carries, 129 yards, 2 TD

**Top receivers**

- OAK – Jordy Nelson – 6 receptions, 88 yards
- CIN – Tyler Boyd – 4 receptions, 38 yards, 1 TD

With the win, the Bengals improved to 6–8. This was Marvin Lewis's last win with the team. Despite leading 17–0 at one time, the Raiders continued to hang around, but were hurt by turnovers and drops. Despite the win, a Tennessee Titans win over the Washington Redskins eliminated the Bengals from playoff contention

==== Week 16: at Cleveland Browns ====
Week Sixteen: Cincinnati Bengals at Cleveland Browns – Game summary

| Quarter | 1 | 2 | 3 | 4 | Total |
|---|---|---|---|---|---|
| Bengals | 0 | 0 | 0 | 18 | **18** |
| **Browns** | 0 | 16 | 7 | 3 | **26** |

at FirstEnergy Stadium, Cleveland, Ohio

- Date: December 23
- Game time: 1:00 pm. EST
- Game weather: 37 °F (3 °C), cloudy
- Game attendance: 67,431
- Referee: Tony Corrente
- TV announcers (CBS): Spero Dedes and Adam Archuleta
- Recap, Gamebook

Game information

**First quarter**

- No scoring plays.

**Second quarter**

- CLE – David Njoku 3-yard pass from Baker Mayfield (Greg Joseph kick), 10:20. Browns 7–0. **Drive: 13 plays, 74 yards, 7:23.**
- CLE – Darren Fells 1-yard pass from Baker Mayfield (PAT failed), 7:33 Browns 13–0. **Drive: 3 plays, 70 yards, 1:33.**
- CLE – Greg Joseph 37-yard field goal, 0:10 Browns 16–0. **Drive: 10 plays, 61 yards, 4:45.**

**Third quarter**

- CLE – Rashard Higgins 17-yard pass from Baker Mayfield (Greg Joseph kick), 4:53 Browns 23–0. **Drive: 9 plays, 87 yards, 4:58.**

**Fourth quarter**

- CIN – Randy Bullock 51-yard field goal, 14:55 Browns 23–3. **Drive: 10 plays, 36 yards, 4:58.**
- CLE – Greg Joseph 31-yard field goal, 7:26 Browns 26–3. **Drive: 14 plays, 62 yards, 7:29.**
- CIN – C. J. Uzomah 14-yard pass from Jeff Driskel (Randy Bullock kick), 4:56 Browns 26–10. **Drive: 6 plays, 75 yards, 2:30.**
- CIN – John Ross 3-yard pass from Jeff Driskel (Jeff Driskel pass to Cody Core), 2:56 Browns 26–18. **Drive: 3 plays, 23 yards, 0:57.**

**Top passers**

- CIN – Jeff Driskel – 13/19, 133 Yds, 2 TD
- CLE – Baker Mayfield – 27/37, 284 Yds, 3 TD

**Top rushers**

- CIN – Joe Mixon – 17 Rush, 68 Yds
- CLE – Nick Chubb – 19 Rush, 112 Yds

**Top receivers**

- CIN – C. J. Uzomah – 4 Rec, 49 Yds, TD
- CLE – Rashard Higgins – 6 Rec, 60 Yds, TD

With the loss, the Bengals dropped to 6-9 assuring them last place in the AFC North. The team also posted 3 consecutive losing seasons for the first time since the 2000–02 seasons. They were also swept by the Browns for the first time since 2002. The loss also assured that the team would finish last in the AFC North.

==== Week 17: at Pittsburgh Steelers ====
Week Seventeen: Cincinnati Bengals at Pittsburgh Steelers – Game summary

| Quarter | 1 | 2 | 3 | 4 | Total |
|---|---|---|---|---|---|
| Bengals | 0 | 10 | 0 | 3 | **13** |
| **Steelers** | 0 | 3 | 7 | 6 | **16** |

at Heinz Field, Pittsburgh, Pennsylvania

- Date: December 30
- Game time: 4:25 pm. EST
- Game weather: 42 °F (6 °C), partly cloudy
- Game attendance: 63,874
- Referee: Carl Cheffers
- TV announcers (CBS): Kevin Harlan, Rich Gannon, and Steve Tasker
- Recap, Gamebook

Game information

**First quarter**

- No scoring plays.

**Second quarter**

- CIN – Shawn Williams 58-yard interception return (Randy Bullock kick), 12:37. Bengals 7–0.
- CIN – Randy Bullock 49-yard field goal, 2:12. Bengals 10–0. **Drive: 12 plays, 51 yards, 6:31.**
- PIT – Matt McCrane 35-yard field goal, 0:00. Bengals 10–3. **Drive: 9 plays, 34 yards, 2:12.**

**Third quarter**

- PIT – JuJu Smith-Schuster 11-yard pass from Ben Roethlisberger (Matt McCrane kick), 3:50. Tied 10–10. **Drive: 3 plays, 74 yards, 1:25.**

**Fourth quarter**

- PIT – Matt McCrane 47-yard field goal, 8:35. Steelers 13–10. **Drive: 13 plays, 48 yards, 7:19.**
- CIN – Randy Bullock 32-yard field goal, 6:17. Tied 13–13. **Drive: 5 plays, 52 yards, 2:18.**
- PIT – Matt McCrane 35-yard field goal, 1:58. Steelers 16–13. **Drive: 12 plays, 58 yards, 4:21.**

**Top passers**

- CIN – Jeff Driskel – 12/24, 95 yards
- PIT – Ben Roethlisberger – 31/45, 287 yards, TD, INT

**Top rushers**

- CIN – Joe Mixon – 13 carries, 105 yards
- PIT – James Conner – 14 carries, 64 yards

**Top receivers**

- CIN – Alex Erickson – 6 receptions, 63 yards
- PIT – James Washington – 3 receptions, 64 yards

With the loss, the Bengals finished their year with a record of 6–10. In Marvin Lewis's last game with the team, the Bengals lost a sluggish game to the Steelers, their 8th straight loss in the rivalry. Despite taking a 10–0 lead in the second quarter, the Steelers went on a 16–3 run to finish the game.

=== Standings ===
==== Division ====
AFC North
| | W | L | T | PCT | DIV | CONF | PF | PA | STK |
|---|---|---|---|---|---|---|---|---|---|
| ^{(4)} Baltimore Ravens | 10 | 6 | 0 | .625 | 3–3 | 8–4 | 389 | 287 | W3 |
| Pittsburgh Steelers | 9 | 6 | 1 | .594 | 4–1–1 | 6–5–1 | 428 | 360 | W1 |
| Cleveland Browns | 7 | 8 | 1 | .469 | 3–2–1 | 5–6–1 | 359 | 392 | L1 |
| Cincinnati Bengals | 6 | 10 | 0 | .375 | 1–5 | 4–8 | 368 | 455 | L2 |

==== Conference ====
AFC
| # | Team | Division | W | L | T | PCT | DIV | CONF | SOS | SOV | STK |
|---|---|---|---|---|---|---|---|---|---|---|---|
**Division leaders**
| 1 (Note: Kansas City finished ahead of LA Chargers in the AFC West based on division record, claiming the No. 1 seed.) | Kansas City Chiefs | West | 12 | 4 | 0 | .750 | 5–1 | 10–2 | .480 | .401 | W1 |
| 2 (Note: New England claimed the No. 2 seed over Houston based on head-to-head victory.) | New England Patriots | East | 11 | 5 | 0 | .688 | 5–1 | 8–4 | .482 | .494 | W2 |
| 3 | Houston Texans | South | 11 | 5 | 0 | .688 | 4–2 | 9–3 | .471 | .435 | W1 |
| 4 | Baltimore Ravens | North | 10 | 6 | 0 | .625 | 3–3 | 8–4 | .496 | .450 | W3 |
**Wild Cards**
| 5 | Los Angeles Chargers | West | 12 | 4 | 0 | .750 | 4–2 | 9–3 | .477 | .422 | W1 |
| 6 | Indianapolis Colts | South | 10 | 6 | 0 | .625 | 4–2 | 7–5 | .465 | .456 | W4 |
**Did not qualify for the postseason**
| 7 | Pittsburgh Steelers | North | 9 | 6 | 1 | .594 | 4–1–1 | 6–5–1 | .504 | .448 | W1 |
| 8 | Tennessee Titans | South | 9 | 7 | 0 | .563 | 3–3 | 5–7 | .520 | .465 | L1 |
| 9 | Cleveland Browns | North | 7 | 8 | 1 | .469 | 3–2–1 | 5–6–1 | .516 | .411 | L1 |
| 10 | Miami Dolphins | East | 7 | 9 | 0 | .438 | 4–2 | 6–6 | .469 | .446 | L3 |
| 11 (Note: Denver finished ahead of Cincinnati and Buffalo based on strength of victory. Cincinnati finished ahead of Buffalo based on record vs. common opponents. Cincinnati's cumulative record against Baltimore, Indianapolis, the Los Angeles Chargers and Miami was 3–2, compared to Buffalo's 1–4 cumulative record against the same four teams.) | Denver Broncos | West | 6 | 10 | 0 | .375 | 2–4 | 4–8 | .523 | .464 | L4 |
| 12 | Cincinnati Bengals | North | 6 | 10 | 0 | .375 | 1–5 | 4–8 | .535 | .448 | L2 |
| 13 | Buffalo Bills | East | 6 | 10 | 0 | .375 | 2–4 | 4–8 | .523 | .411 | W1 |
| 14 | Jacksonville Jaguars | South | 5 | 11 | 0 | .313 | 1–5 | 4–8 | .549 | .463 | L1 |
| 15 (Note: NY Jets finished ahead of Oakland based on strength of victory.) | New York Jets | East | 4 | 12 | 0 | .250 | 1–5 | 3–9 | .506 | .438 | L3 |
| 16 | Oakland Raiders | West | 4 | 12 | 0 | .250 | 1–5 | 3–9 | .547 | .406 | L1 |
**Tiebreakers** (Note: When breaking ties for three or more teams under the NFL's rules, they are first broken within divisions, then comparing only the highest ranked remaining team from each division.)
