= Kyzir White =

American football player (born 1996)

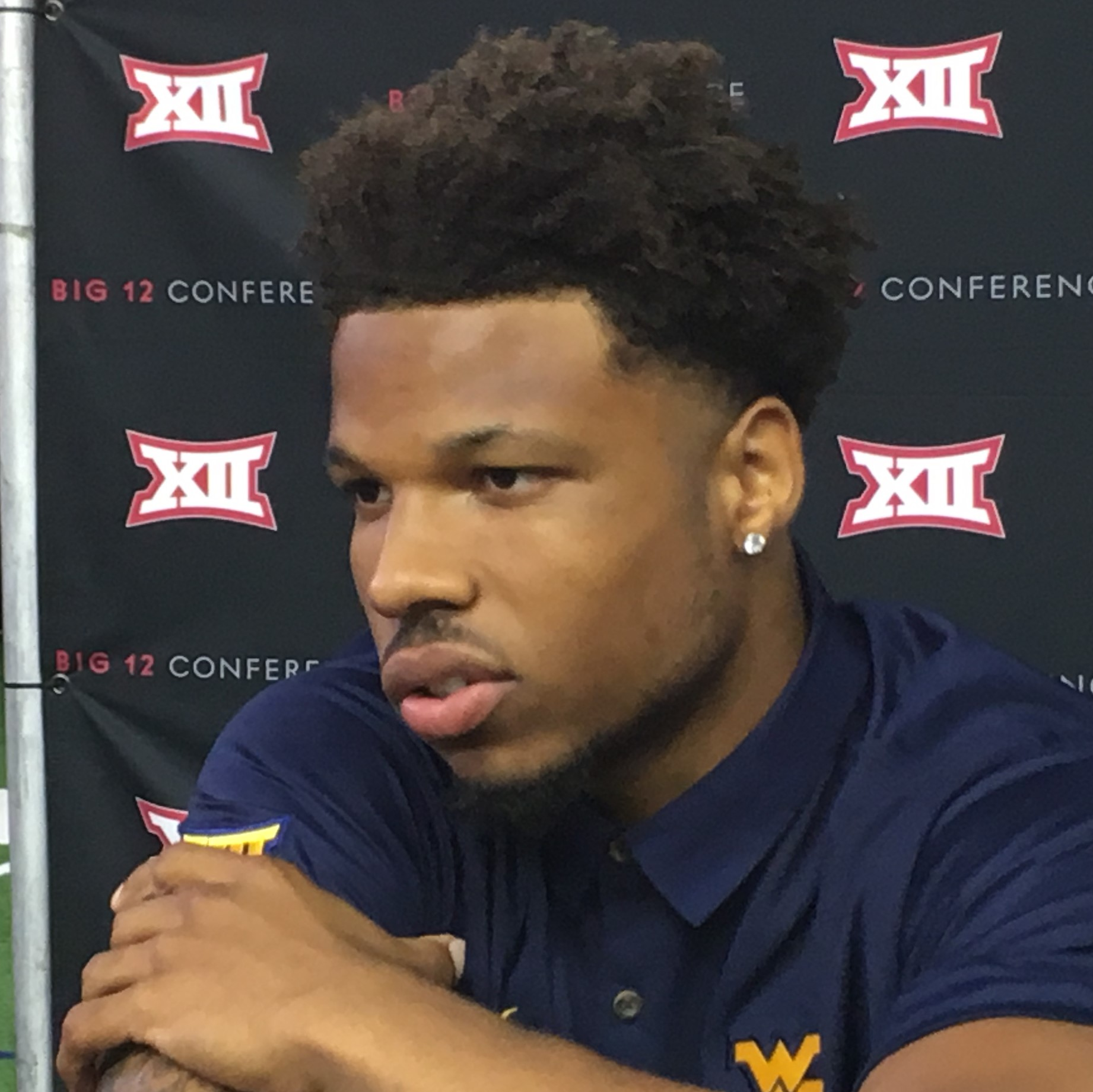
- White in 2017

Profile
- Position: Linebacker

Personal information
- Born: March 24, 1996 (age 30); Macungie, Pennsylvania, U.S.
- Listed height: 6 ft 2 in (1.88 m)
- Listed weight: 234 lb (106 kg)

Career information
- High school: Emmaus (Emmaus, Pennsylvania)
- College: Lackawanna (2014–2015); West Virginia (2016–2017)
- NFL draft: 2018: 4th round, 119th overall pick

Career history
- Los Angeles Chargers (2018–2021); Philadelphia Eagles (2022); Arizona Cardinals (2023–2024); Tennessee Titans (2025); San Francisco 49ers (2025)*
- * Offseason or practice squad member only

Awards and highlights
- Second-team All-Big 12 (2017)

Career NFL statistics as of 2025
- Total tackles: 618
- Sacks: 7.5
- Forced fumbles: 2
- Fumble recoveries: 1
- Interceptions: 6
- Pass deflections: 23
- Stats at Pro Football Reference

Kyzir Rasim White (born March 24, 1996) is an American professional football linebacker. He played college football for the Lackawanna Falcons and West Virginia Mountaineers and was selected by the Los Angeles Chargers in the fourth round of the 2018 NFL draft. He has also played for the Arizona Cardinals, Philadelphia Eagles, and Tennessee Titans.

== Early life ==
White played high school football at Emmaus High School in Pennsylvania's highly-competitive East Penn Conference, where his play was highlighted by MaxPreps and other outlets highlighting top high school prospects.

== College career ==
Following two years as a safety at Lackawanna College, White committed to West Virginia over offers from Pittsburgh, Arizona State, Louisville, and Illinois. In his career at West Virginia, he was a two-year starter at the “spur” position, a hybrid linebacker/safety role. In 25 career starts at WVU, White recorded 152 total tackles, four sacks, three interceptions, nine passes defended, and four forced fumbles. He was named Second-Team All-Big 12 for his success in 2017, recording 94 tackles, two forced fumbles, one sack, seven pass breakups, and three interceptions.

== Professional career ==
External videos
- Kyzir White's NFL Combine Workout
- NFL Draft Profile: Kyzir White

Pre-draft measurables
Height	Weight	Arm length	Hand span	Wingspan	40-yard dash	10-yard split	20-yard split	20-yard shuttle	Three-cone drill	Vertical jump	Broad jump	Bench press
6 ft 1 7/8 in (1.88 m)	218 lb (99 kg)	31 5/8 in (0.80 m)	10 1/8 in (0.26 m)	6 ft 4 3/4 in (1.95 m)	4.69 s	1.55 s	2.67 s	4.26 s	6.96 s	35.5 in (0.90 m)	10 ft 2 in (3.10 m)	21 reps
All values from NFL Combine/West Virginia's Pro Day

=== Los Angeles Chargers ===
==== 2018 ====
External videos
- Chargers select Kyzir White at No. 119

In the 2018 NFL draft, White was drafted by the Los Angeles Chargers in the fourth round (119th overall). White was the 11th safety drafted in 2018.

On May 13, 2018, the Chargers signed White to a four-year, $3.11 million contract that includes a signing bonus of $654,441.

"It's hard for me to talk about Kyzir because I get real excited. I don't want to jump the gun on him. I want to get him in some games and watch him play, but just watching him run around here and some of the things he did in the offseason, I get real excited talking about him. His speed. His attitude. His explosiveness. He just has great instincts as a football player. We had a hammer on him (in the draft)."

— Anthony Lynn, Los Angeles Chargers head coach

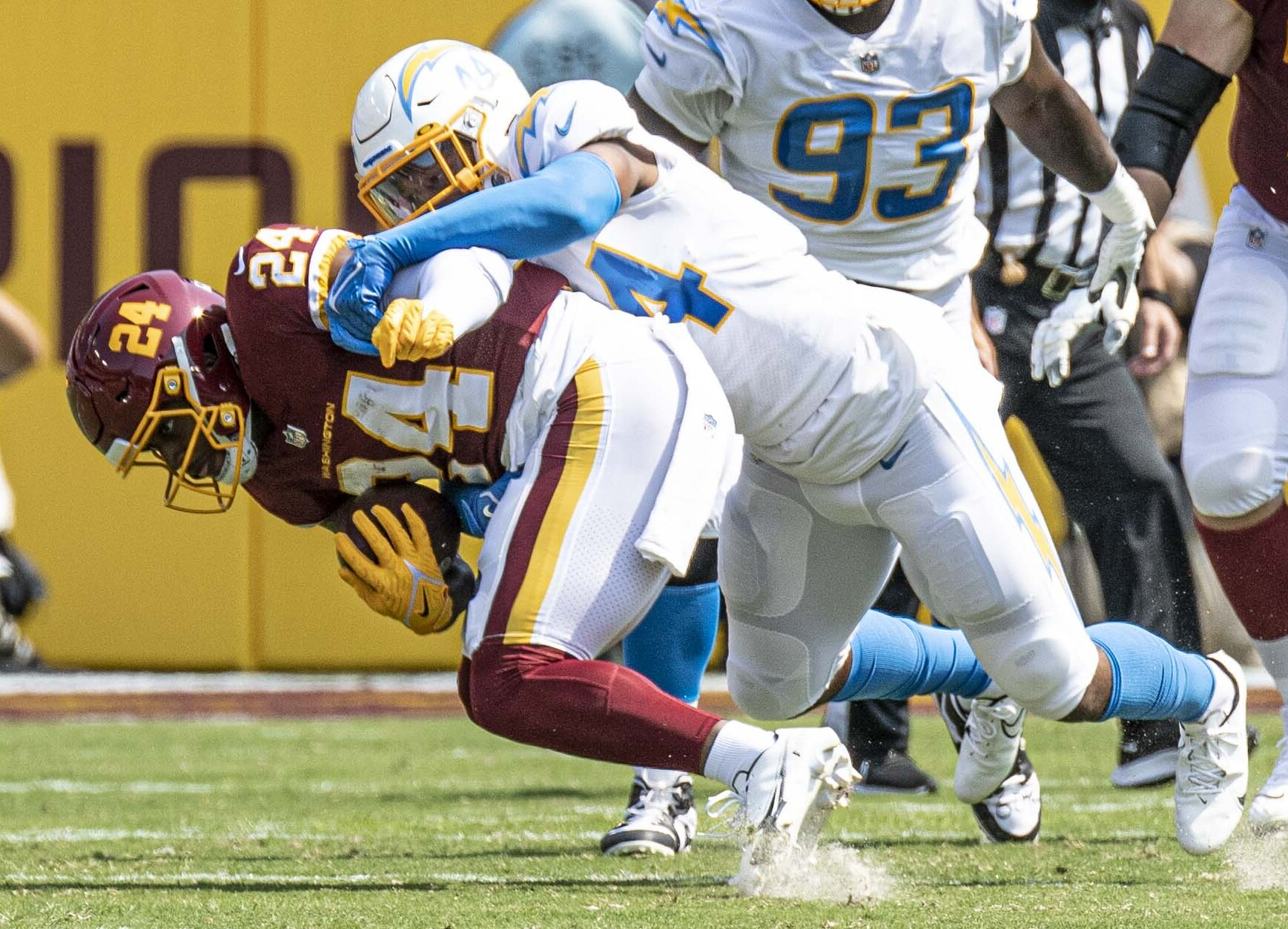
White with the 2021 Los Angeles Chargers tackling Washington Football Team running back Antonio Gibson, September 12, 2021

During rookie minicamp in the 2018 season, Chargers' coaching staff announced their decision to move White to linebacker. White adjusted to the new position quickly and immediately impressed coaching staff. During training camp, he began competing as the Chargers' starting weak side linebacker against Jatavis Brown. Head coach Anthony Lynn named White the backup weakside linebacker behind Brown to start the regular season. But an hour before kickoff in the Chargers' season-opener, it was reported Lynn has instead elected to start White alongside Kyle Emanuel and middle linebacker Denzel Perryman.

White made his professional regular season debut and first career start on September 9, 2018, in the Chargers' season-opener against the Kansas City Chiefs and recorded six combined tackles in their 38–28 loss. On September 16, 2018, White recorded four solo tackles, broke up two passes, and made his first career interception during a 31–20 win at the Buffalo Bills in Week 2. He made his first career interception off a pass thrown by Bills' rookie quarterback Josh Allen intended for tight end Jason Croom, and returned it for a nine-yard gain in the game's fourth quarter. In a Week 3 game at the Los Angeles Rams, White suffered a knee injury that required minor surgery, and he was inactive for the following four games (Weeks 4–8). On November 3, 2018, the Chargers announced he was being placed on injured reserve.

==== 2019 ====
In Week 5 of the 2019 season, White recorded an interception off Denver Broncos quarterback Joe Flacco in the Chargers' 20–13 loss.

==== 2020 ====
White was placed on the reserve/COVID-19 list by the Chargers on November 21, 2020 during the 2020 season, and was reactivated on December 9. On December 23, 2020, White was placed on injured reserve due to a hamstring injury.

==== 2021 ====
White entered the 2021 season as the Chargers' starting linebacker and finished the season as the team's leading tackler with 144 tackles, one sack, two forced fumbles, three passes defensed, and two interceptions.

=== Philadelphia Eagles ===
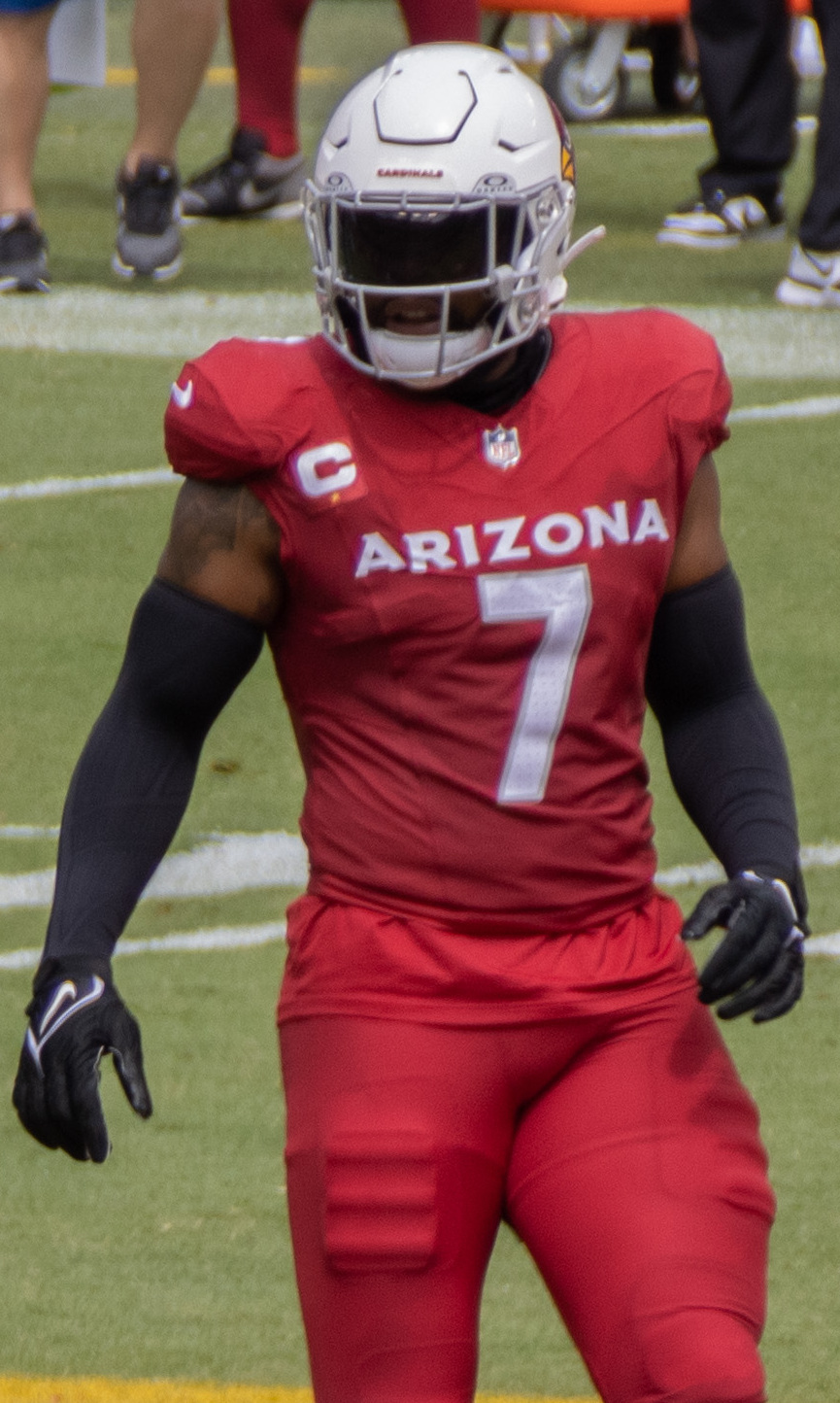
White with the Arizona Cardinals in September 2023

On March 26, 2022, White signed a one-year contract, worth up to $5 million, with the Philadelphia Eagles. In the 2022 season with the Eagles, White and the Eagles reached Super Bowl LVII, where they lost 38–35 to the Chiefs. White had four tackles in Super Bowl LVII.

=== Arizona Cardinals ===
On March 15, 2023, White signed a two-year contract with the Arizona Cardinals. He started 11 games his first year in Arizona, leading the team with 90 tackles, along with two sacks, three passes defensed, and one interception.

In 2024, White finished second on the team with 137 tackles, along with 2.5 sacks, three passes defensed, and one interception through 17 starts.

=== Tennessee Titans ===
On September 3, 2025, White was signed to the Tennessee Titans' practice squad. He was released on December 8.

=== San Francisco 49ers ===
On January 7, 2026, White was signed to the San Francisco 49ers' practice squad.

== Personal life ==
White has two brothers, Kevin and Ka'Raun, both of whom also played college football at Lackawanna before transferring to West Virginia. White's older brother Kevin is a wide receiver who was drafted by the Chicago Bears in the first round in 2015 and later played with the New Orleans Saints and San Francisco 49ers.
