= Kevin White (American football) =

American football player (born 1992)

No. 13, 11, 14, 17
- Position: Wide receiver

Personal information
- Born: June 25, 1992 (age 34); Plainfield, New Jersey, U.S.
- Listed height: 6 ft 3 in (1.91 m)
- Listed weight: 216 lb (98 kg)

Career information
- High school: Emmaus (Emmaus, Pennsylvania)
- College: Lackawanna (2010, 2012); West Virginia (2013–2014)
- NFL draft: 2015: 1st round, 7th overall pick

Career history
- Chicago Bears (2015–2018); Arizona Cardinals (2019)*; San Francisco 49ers (2020); New Orleans Saints (2021–2022)
- * Offseason or practice squad member only

Awards and highlights
- First-team All-American (2014); First-team All-Big 12 (2014)

Career NFL statistics
- Receptions: 28
- Receiving yards: 397
- Stats at Pro Football Reference

Kevin Romone White Jr. (born June 25, 1992) is an American former professional football player who was a wide receiver in the National Football League (NFL). He played college football for the West Virginia Mountaineers, earning first-team All-American honors in 2014.

A highly-rated prospect coming out of college, White was selected by the Chicago Bears in the first round of the 2015 NFL draft with the seventh overall selection. His first three seasons with the Bears were injury plagued, and he was released by the Bears following the 2018 season. He was also a member of the Arizona Cardinals (2019), San Francisco 49ers (2020), and New Orleans Saints (2021–2022).

== Early life ==
White was born on June 25, 1992, in Plainfield, New Jersey. He played high school football at Emmaus High School in Emmaus, Pennsylvania, which competes in the East Penn Conference.

== College career ==
After graduating high school, he attended Lackawanna College for two seasons before attending West Virginia University. In his first season at West Virginia in 2013, he started nine of 11 games and had 35 receptions for 507 yards and five touchdowns. White returned his senior season in 2014 as a starter. He finished the season with 109 receptions for 1,447 yards and 10 touchdowns. He was named an All-American by numerous publications and was a finalist for the Fred Biletnikoff Award.

=== Statistics ===
Year	Team	GP	Receiving		
Year	Team	GP	Rec	Yards	TDs
2013	West Virginia	10	35	507	5
2014	West Virginia	13	109	1,447	10
Career		23	144	1,954	15

== Professional career ==
=== Pre-draft ===
Pre-draft measurables
Height	Weight	Arm length	Hand span	40-yard dash	10-yard split	20-yard split	20-yard shuttle	Three-cone drill	Vertical jump	Broad jump	Bench press
6 ft 2 5/8 in (1.90 m)	215 lb (98 kg)	32 5/8 in (0.83 m)	9 1/4 in (0.23 m)	4.35 s	1.53 s	2.54 s	4.14 s	6.92 s	36.5 in (0.93 m)	10 ft 3 in (3.12 m)	23 reps
All values from NFL Combine

White was considered one of the two best wide receivers of the 2015 class, together with Amari Cooper.

=== Chicago Bears ===
He was drafted by the Chicago Bears with the seventh overall draft pick in the 2015 NFL draft. On May 6, 2015, White signed a four-year, $15 million contract with the team.

While participating in the Bears off-season program, White received a minor injury to his shin that held him out of several training camp practices. Shortly after returning, Bears general manager Ryan Pace announced on August 15, 2015, that White had suffered a stress fracture in his shin while participating in organized team activities that would require surgery. On August 23, 2015, White had a steel rod inserted into his left tibia and was placed on the Bears physically unable to perform (PUP) list. White did not play a single game during his rookie season of 2015.

After playing the first four games in the 2016 season, it was announced on October 5, 2016, that White had fractured the fibula in his left leg, the same leg he had injured the year before, and that he has been placed on injured reserve.

White was a starter in the Bears' 2017 season-opener against the Atlanta Falcons. However, he fractured his left shoulder blade in the game. He recorded only two receptions for six yards during the game. White was placed on injured reserve for the third straight year on September 10, 2017.

On May 2, 2018, the Bears declined White's fifth-year option. On October 21, with the Bears trailing the New England Patriots 38–31 late in the game, White caught a 54-yard Hail Mary pass from quarterback Mitchell Trubisky as time expired. However, he was stopped one yard short, ensuring a Bears loss.

=== Arizona Cardinals ===
On March 15, 2019, White signed a one-year contract with the Arizona Cardinals, but was released by the team prior to the regular season on August 21. After sitting out the 2019 NFL season, White had a tryout with the New York Jets on August 20, 2020.

=== San Francisco 49ers ===
White signed with the San Francisco 49ers on August 27, 2020. He was released by San Francisco on September 5, and was re-signed to their practice squad the following day. White was elevated to the active roster for the team's Weeks 5, 6, and 9 games against the Miami Dolphins, Los Angeles Rams, and Green Bay Packers, and reverted to the practice squad after each game. He was placed on the practice squad/COVID-19 list by the team on December 22, and restored to the practice squad on December 31.

White signed a reserve/future contract with San Francisco on January 4, 2021. He was released by the 49ers on August 11.

=== New Orleans Saints ===
White signed with the New Orleans Saints on August 17, 2021. He was released by New Orleans on August 31, and was subsequently re-signed to the team's practice squad. On October 31, White made his first reception in three years, for 38 yards against the Tampa Bay Buccaneers from quarterback Trevor Siemian. The Saints went on to win the game, 36-27. He was signed to the Saints' active roster on November 13, but was released a week later on November 20. White was once more re-signed three days later, but was released on November 30 and reassigned to the practice squad.

White signed a reserve/future contract with the Saints on January 12, 2022. On August 23, White was placed on injured reserve. He was released by the Saints on August 27. White was re-signed to the team's practice squad on October 5. White was activated from the practice squad and made his season debut for the Saints on October 20, where he recorded a career-long 64-yard reception in a 42–34 loss to the Arizona Cardinals. He was signed to the active roster on November 7. White was released by New Orleans on December 5. He was again re-signed back to the practice squad on December 7. White's practice squad contract with the team expired after the regular season on January 8, 2023.

== Personal life ==
White has two younger brothers, Ka'Raun and Kyzir, who both played football at West Virginia. Kyzir is a linebacker who was drafted in the fourth round of the 2018 NFL draft by the Los Angeles Chargers, where he played for three years. In 2022, he joined the Philadelphia Eagles' Super Bowl team.
