= Rod Taylor (American football) =

American football player (born 1994)

Profile
- Position: Offensive lineman

Personal information
- Born: October 26, 1994 (age 32); Jackson, Mississippi, U.S.
- Listed height: 6 ft 3 in (1.91 m)
- Listed weight: 320 lb (145 kg)

Career information
- High school: Callaway (Jackson, Mississippi)
- College: Ole Miss (2014–2017)
- NFL draft: 2018: 7th round, 252nd overall pick

Career history
- Cincinnati Bengals (2018); Team 9 (2020)*; DC Defenders (2023); Vegas Vipers (2023)
- * Offseason or practice squad member only
- Stats at Pro Football Reference

Roderick Taylor (born October 26, 1994) is an American professional football offensive lineman. Highly recruited out of Callaway High School, he played college football for the Ole Miss Rebels, where he was a part-time starter in his first three years and a full-time starter as a senior. He was selected in the seventh round of the 2018 NFL draft by the Cincinnati Bengals. He has also been a member of the XFL's Team 9, DC Defenders, and Vegas Vipers, although he only saw playing time with the Defenders.

== Early life ==
Roderick Taylor was born on October 26, 1994. He grew up in Jackson, Mississippi and attended Callaway High School, at which he played football, basketball, and ran track. He was a very highly regarded offensive lineman for the school, being ranked as high as the top guard recruit nationally by one source. As a junior he was named The Clarion-Ledger All-Metro and second-team Class 5A All-State, and as a senior Taylor received numerous honors after posting over 100 pancake blocks with no sacks allowed. He was an Under Armour All-American, first-team All-State, MaxPreps All-American, Medium School All-American and All-Metro selection, and helped Callaway win a school-record 14 games while also earning selection to The Clarion-Ledger's Dandy Dozen and Targeted 22 lists, the latter of which he placed first on.

Taylor was the consensus top-ranked player in the state, a five-star prospect, and the 25th-best ranked player nationally according to 247Sports. Although for a while it was believed that he would commit to play college football for the Alabama Crimson Tide, he ended up changing to Ole Miss after coach Jeff Stoutland left.

== College career ==
As a freshman at Ole Miss in 2014, Taylor appeared in all 13 games. He posted his first career start on November 8 against Presbyterian, appearing as their right guard after an injury to Laremy Tunsil. Taylor started one further game on the season, while earning his first varsity letter.

Taylor was expected to become a full-time starter as a sophomore in 2015, but was hampered by an injury suffered in a non-football activity shortly before the season. Despite this, he was still able to appear in 10 games, two of which he started. In 2016, Taylor earned a starting role at left tackle. He was limited by injuries, however, and only started seven out of 13 games, while appearing in a further two.

After going through several injuries in the prior seasons, Taylor remained healthy as a senior in 2017 and started all 12 games at right tackle. He finished his college career with 44 games played, 23 of which he started. Taylor was named an honorable mention on The Clarion-Ledger's Ole Miss 2010s All-Decade team.

== Professional career ==
Pre-draft measurables
Height	Weight	Arm length	Hand span	40-yard dash	10-yard split	20-yard split	20-yard shuttle	Three-cone drill	Vertical jump	Broad jump	Bench press
6 ft 2 7/8 in (1.90 m)	320 lb (145 kg)	34 1/4 in (0.87 m)	9 3/4 in (0.25 m)	5.24 s	1.79 s	3.03 s	4.83 s	8.00 s	30.5 in (0.77 m)	8 ft 3 in (2.51 m)	21 reps
All values from NFL Combine/Pro Day

=== Cincinnati Bengals ===
Taylor was one of four Ole Miss players to be invited to the 2018 NFL Scouting Combine. He was not a highly ranked prospect with scouts citing doubts relating to his maturity, body control, lack of length and motivation, although he improved his draft stock with an impressive combine performance, including a 5.24 second 40-yard dash. The majority of sources projected him to be a 7th-round draft pick or an undrafted free agent. He ended up being selected by the Cincinnati Bengals, in the 7th round, with the 252nd pick of the 2018 NFL draft.

However, Taylor suffered a torn ACL in training camp and ended up missing the entirety of his rookie season. He was waived during the following season's training camp, on June 10, 2019. While a free agent in September, he was suspended for four games by the NFL, believed to be for violating the rules on performance-enhancing drugs (PEDs). On October 19, after the suspension ended, he received another, this time for ten games. At the end of December, Taylor received an indefinite ban from the league.

=== XFL ===
In 2020, Taylor was a member of Team 9, which functioned as the practice squad of the XFL. He had his contract terminated when the league suspended operations on April 10.

After then spending two years out of professional football, Taylor was signed by the DC Defenders of the XFL on January 19, 2023. He made the team's final roster. He was ejected from their game against the St. Louis BattleHawks after being involved in a fight, and was fined by the league for it. After having appeared in three games for the Defenders, one as a starter, he was waived; however, Taylor was claimed off waivers by the Vegas Vipers on March 13. He was released on April 14, without appearing in a game.
