= Ka'Raun White =

American football player (born 1997)

Profile
- Position: Wide receiver

Personal information
- Born: July 4, 1993 (age 33); Macungie, Pennsylvania, U.S.
- Listed height: 6 ft 1 in (1.85 m)
- Listed weight: 206 lb (93 kg)

Career information
- High school: Emmaus (Emmaus, Pennsylvania)
- College: West Virginia
- NFL draft: 2018: undrafted

Career history
- Seattle Seahawks (2018)*; Cincinnati Bengals (2018)*; Pittsburgh Steelers (2019)*
- * Offseason or practice squad member only
- Stats at Pro Football Reference

Ka'Raun White (born July 4, 1993) is an American former football wide receiver. He played college football at West Virginia. In his Mountaineer career, White caught 124 passes for 1,852 yards and 17 touchdowns. After going undrafted in the 2018 NFL draft, White was signed by the Seattle Seahawks.

== High school ==
White played high school football at Emmaus High School in Emmaus, Pennsylvania.

== College ==
On the collegiate level, White played for West Virginia.

== Professional career ==
Pre-draft measurables
Height	Weight	Arm length	Hand span	40-yard dash	10-yard split	20-yard split	20-yard shuttle	Three-cone drill	Vertical jump	Broad jump	Bench press
6 ft 1 in (1.85 m)	206 lb (93 kg)	32 1/4 in (0.82 m)	9 5/8 in (0.24 m)	4.52 s	1.57 s	2.65 s	4.57 s	7.16 s	33.5 in (0.85 m)	9 ft 10 in (3.00 m)	24 reps
All values from NFL Combine

=== Seattle Seahawks ===
White signed with the Seattle Seahawks as an undrafted free agent on May 4, 2018. He was waived three days later.

=== Cincinnati Bengals ===
On May 8, 2018, White was claimed off waivers by the Cincinnati Bengals. He was waived on September 1, 2018.

=== Pittsburgh Steelers ===
On January 3, 2019, the Pittsburgh Steelers signed White to a reserve/future contract. He was waived on May 13, 2019.

== Personal life ==
White's older brother Kevin is a wide receiver who was drafted in the first round by the Chicago Bears in 2015 and later played for the New Orleans Saints and San Francisco 49ers.

White's younger brother Kyzir is a linebacker who was drafted in 2018 by the Los Angeles Chargers, where he played for four seasons, and then joined the Philadelphia Eagles during its 2022 Super Bowl season and now plays for the Tennessee Titans.
