= Dan Pitcher =

American football player and coach (born 1987)

Cincinnati Bengals
- Title: Offensive coordinator

Personal information
- Born: January 13, 1987 (age 39); Cortland, New York, U.S.
- Listed height: 6 ft 0 in (1.83 m)
- Listed weight: 200 lb (91 kg)

Career information
- Position: Quarterback
- High school: Cortland (NY)
- College: Colgate (2006–2008); Cortland (2009–2011)

Career history

Coaching
- Cortland (2012) Wide receivers coach; Cincinnati Bengals (2016–present); Offensive assistant (2016–2018); Assistant quarterbacks coach (2019); Quarterbacks coach (2020–2023); Offensive coordinator (2024–present)

Operations
- Indianapolis Colts (2012–2015); Scouting assistant (2012–2013); Pro scout (2014–2015)
- Coaching profile at Pro Football Reference

Dan Pitcher (born January 13, 1987) is an American professional football coach who is the offensive coordinator for the Cincinnati Bengals of the National Football League (NFL). He previously served as an assistant coach with the Bengals from 2016 to 2023. Pitcher played college football as a quarterback for Colgate and SUNY Cortland.

== Early life and education ==
Born in Cortland, New York, Pitcher attended Cortland High School before playing as a quarterback at Colgate University in Hamilton, New York from 2006 to 2008. Pitcher then transferred to his hometown college SUNY Cortland, starting from 2009 to 2011. As a senior, Pitcher was a finalist for the Gagliardi Trophy, the Division III equivalent of the Heisman Trophy. While at SUNY Cortland, he earned a bachelor's degree in psychology in 2010 and a master's degree in Sport Management in 2011.

== Coaching career ==
=== SUNY Cortland ===
After his playing career at SUNY Cortland ended, Pitcher joined the Red Dragons coaching staff as their wide receivers coach in 2012.

=== Indianapolis Colts ===
In 2012, Pitcher was hired by the Indianapolis Colts as a scouting assistant. Two years later, he was promoted by the Colts to a pro scout.

=== Cincinnati Bengals ===
In 2016, Pitcher was hired by the Cincinnati Bengals as an offensive assistant under head coach Marvin Lewis, working with the wide receivers. Pitcher was shifted to working with the quarterbacks in 2018.

In 2019, Pitcher was promoted to assistant quarterbacks coach and game management specialist under new head coach Zac Taylor.

In 2020, Pitcher was promoted to quarterbacks coach, replacing Alex Van Pelt following his departure to become the offensive coordinator for the Cleveland Browns.

On January 29, 2023, Pitcher signed a contract extension with the Bengals.

On January 25, 2024, Pitcher was promoted to offensive coordinator, replacing Brian Callahan following his departure to become the head coach for the Tennessee Titans.

== Personal life ==
Pitcher and his wife, Marissa, have a son named Oliver.
