= Darius Phillips =

American football player (born 1995)

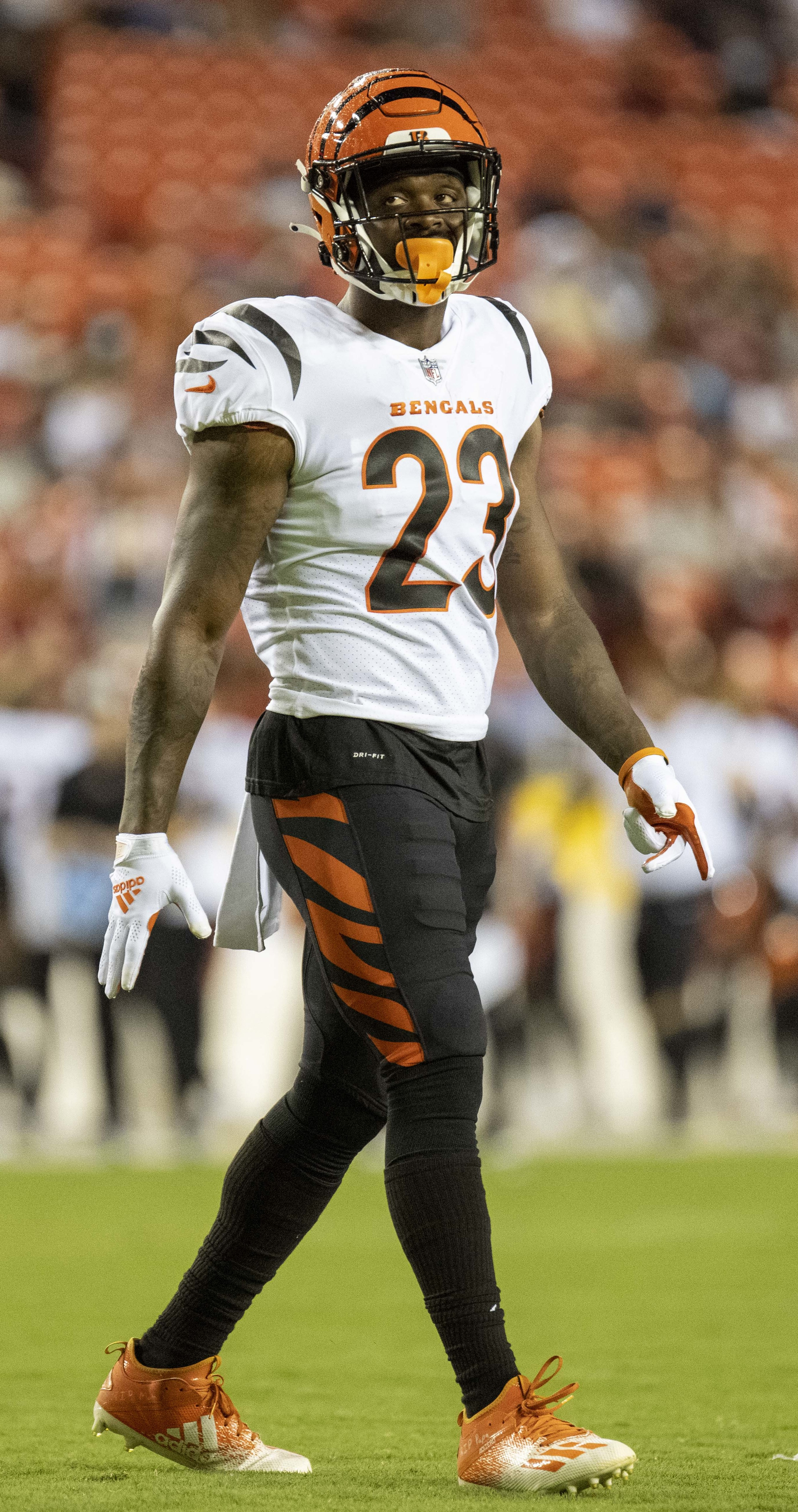
- Phillips with the Cincinnati Bengals in 2021

Profile
- Position: Cornerback

Personal information
- Born: June 26, 1995 (age 31); Detroit, Michigan, U.S.
- Listed height: 5 ft 9 in (1.75 m)
- Listed weight: 190 lb (86 kg)

Career information
- High school: Robichaud (Dearborn Heights, Michigan)
- College: Western Michigan
- NFL draft: 2018: 5th round, 170th overall pick

Career history
- Cincinnati Bengals (2018–2021); Las Vegas Raiders (2022)*; Denver Broncos (2022); Houston Texans (2023)*; Detroit Lions (2023)*; Tennessee Titans (2023)*; San Antonio Brahmas (2024–2025); Memphis Showboats (2025)
- * Offseason or practice squad member only

Awards and highlights
- 2× MAC Special Teams Player of the Year (2016, 2017); 2× First-team All-MAC (2016, 2017); Second-team All-MAC (2015)

Career NFL statistics
- Total tackles: 75
- Forced fumbles: 3
- Fumble recoveries: 1
- Pass deflections: 23
- Interceptions: 6
- Return yards: 751
- Stats at Pro Football Reference

Darius Phillips (born June 26, 1995) is an American professional football cornerback. He played college football at Western Michigan and was selected by the Cincinnati Bengals in the fifth round of the 2018 NFL draft.

== College career ==
Phillips played four seasons at Western Michigan. Starting out as a wide receiver, Phillips caught 32 passes for 479 yards and three touchdowns as a freshman, while also rushing 3 times for 37 yards. He was converted to defensive back as a sophomore. In three years on defense, he recorded 127 tackles, 13 tackles for loss, 2 sacks, and 12 interceptions, which returned for 376 yards and 5 touchdowns. But his primary role was as a kick returner. He led the Mid-American Conference in kickoff return yards in 2014 and 2016, finishing with 130 kickoff returns for a school record 3,193 yards, which ranked 5th all time in NCAA history. He returned five kickoffs for touchdowns, while also returning 32 punts for 327 yards and another score.

== Professional career ==
Pre-draft measurables
Height	Weight	Arm length	Hand span	40-yard dash	10-yard split	20-yard split	20-yard shuttle	Vertical jump	Bench press
5 ft 9 7/8 in (1.77 m)	193 lb (88 kg)	31 1/2 in (0.80 m)	9 1/8 in (0.23 m)	4.40 s	1.57 s	2.51 s	4.18 s	32.5 in (0.83 m)	9 reps
All values from NFL Combine/Pro Day

=== Cincinnati Bengals ===
Phillips played college football at Western Michigan before being selected by the Cincinnati Bengals in the fifth round (170th overall) of the 2018 NFL draft.

In Week 3 of the 2019 season, Phillips recorded his first career interception off Josh Allen in the 21–17 loss. He was placed on injured reserve on September 26, 2019 with a knee injury. He was designated for return from injured reserve on November 21, 2019, and began practicing with the team again. He was activated on November 29, 2019 prior to Week 13. Phillips intercepted a pass thrown by Ryan Fitzpatrick in a Week 16 overtime loss against the Miami Dolphins. He recorded two interceptions during a win against the Cleveland Browns the following week.

Phillips recorded his first interception of the 2020 season during a loss to the Browns in Week 7. He was placed on injured reserve on November 14, 2020; and was activated on December 9, 2020.

On December 14, 2021, Phillips was placed on injured reserve.

=== Las Vegas Raiders ===
Phillips signed a one-year contract with the Las Vegas Raiders on March 17, 2022. He was released on August 30, 2022.

=== Denver Broncos ===
On September 1, 2022, Phillips was signed by the Denver Broncos. He was placed on injured reserve on December 20.

=== Houston Texans ===
On May 4, 2023, Phillips signed with the Houston Texans. He was released on August 25, 2023.

=== Detroit Lions ===
On September 20, 2023, Phillips was signed to the practice squad of the Detroit Lions. He was released on October 10.

=== Tennessee Titans ===
On December 26, 2023, Phillips was signed to the Tennessee Titans practice squad. He was not signed to a reserve/future contract and thus became a free agent when his contract expired at the end of the season.

=== San Antonio Brahmas ===
On January 19, 2024, Phillips signed with the San Antonio Brahmas of the United Football League (UFL). He re-signed with the team on August 29, 2024.

=== Memphis Showboats ===
On May 5, 2025, Phillips was traded to the Memphis Showboats in exchange for wide receiver Dee Anderson. Phillips was released on May 12.
