= Trayvon Henderson =

American football player (born 1995)

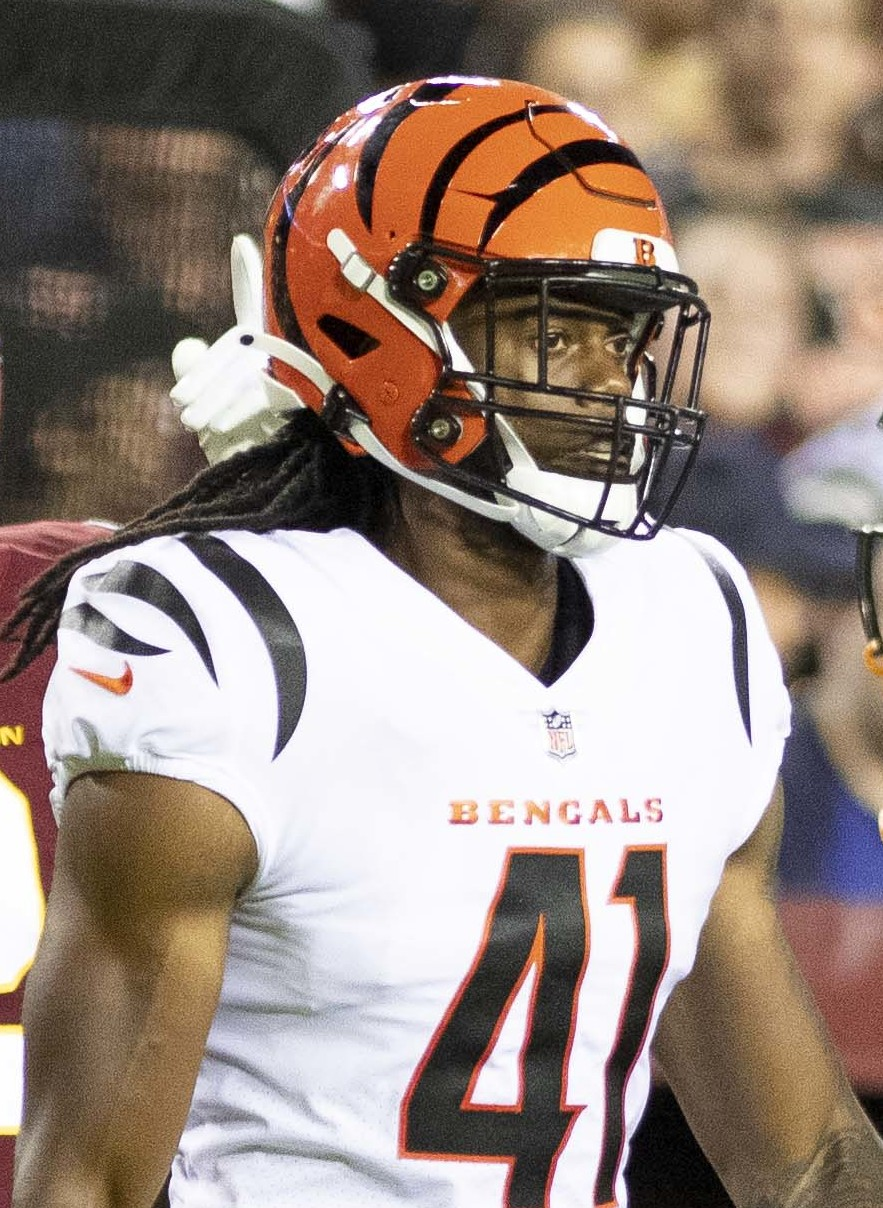
- Henderson with the Cincinnati Bengals in 2021

No. 41
- Position: Safety

Personal information
- Born: August 15, 1995 (age 31); Sacramento, California, U.S.
- Listed height: 6 ft 0 in (1.83 m)
- Listed weight: 205 lb (93 kg)

Career information
- High school: Grant Union (Sacramento)
- College: Hawaii
- NFL draft: 2018: undrafted

Career history
- Cincinnati Bengals (2018–2022)

Career NFL statistics
- Total tackles: 5
- Fumble recoveries: 1
- Defensive touchdowns: 1
- Stats at Pro Football Reference

Trayvon Henderson (born August 15, 1995) is an American former professional football player who was a safety for the Cincinnati Bengals of the National Football League (NFL). He played college football for the Hawaii Rainbow Warriors.

== Professional career ==
Pre-draft measurables
Height	Weight	Arm length	Hand span	40-yard dash	10-yard split	20-yard split	20-yard shuttle	Three-cone drill	Vertical jump	Broad jump	Bench press
6 ft 0 1/8 in (1.83 m)	208 lb (94 kg)	31 1/4 in (0.79 m)	9 1/8 in (0.23 m)	4.58 s	1.59 s	2.65 s	4.15 s	6.88 s	39.5 in (1.00 m)	10 ft 4 in (3.15 m)	10 reps
All values from Pro Day

Henderson signed with the Cincinnati Bengals as an undrafted free agent on May 11, 2018. He was placed on injured reserve on September 1, 2018.

On August 31, 2019, Henderson was waived by the Bengals and was signed to the practice squad the next day. He was promoted to the active roster on December 7, 2019.

On September 5, 2020, Henderson was waived by the Bengals and signed to the practice squad the next day. He was elevated to the active roster for the team's week 1 game against the Los Angeles Chargers, then reverted to the practice squad following the game. He was again elevated to the team's active roster on September 17 for the team's week 2 game against the Cleveland Browns, then returned to the practice squad the next day. On November 18, 2020, he was placed on the practice squad/COVID-19 list by the team, and reinstated to the practice squad three days later. He was signed to the active roster on December 12, 2020. On December 26, 2020, Henderson was waived. On December 29, 2020, Henderson re-signed with Cincinnati's practice squad.

Henderson signed a reserve/future contract on January 4, 2021. He was waived on August 31, 2021, but signed with the practice squad the next day.

On February 15, 2022, Henderson signed a reserve/future contract. He was released during final roster cuts on August 30.
