= UConn Huskies =

College athletic program of the University of Connecticut, US

- University: University of Connecticut
- Nickname: Huskies
- NCAA: Division I (FBS)
- Conference: Big East (primary); Hockey East (ice hockey); Independent (football); CAA (women's rowing)
- Athletic director: David Benedict
- Location: Storrs, Connecticut
- Varsity teams: 21 (8 men's and 13 women's)
- Football stadium: Pratt & Whitney Stadium at Rentschler Field
- Basketball arena: Gampel Pavilion; PeoplesBank Arena
- Ice hockey arena: Toscano Family Ice Forum
- Baseball stadium: Elliot Ballpark
- Soccer stadium: Morrone Stadium
- Colors: National flag blue and white
- Mascot: Jonathan the Husky
- Fight song: "UConn Husky"
- Website: uconnhuskies.com

Team NCAA championships
- 25

Individual and relay NCAA champions
- 2

The UConn Huskies (or Connecticut Huskies) are the intercollegiate athletic teams that represent the University of Connecticut, with its main campus located in Storrs, Connecticut. The school is a member of the NCAA's Division I and the Big East Conference.

The university's athletic teams mainly play at on-campus facilities, but the football team plays at Rentschler Field in East Hartford, and the men's and women's basketball teams share their home court designation at Harry A. Gampel Pavilion on-campus and at the PeoplesBank Arena in Hartford.

== History ==
=== Nickname ===
The university's teams are nicknamed "Huskies", a name adopted following a student poll in The Connecticut Campus in 1934 after the school's name changed from Connecticut Agricultural College to Connecticut State College in 1933; before then, the teams were referred to as the Aggies. Although there is a homophonic relationship between "UConn" and the Yukon, where Huskies are native, the "Huskies" nickname predates the school's 1939 name change to the University of Connecticut; the first recorded use of "UConn" (as "U-Conn", both separately and with "Huskies") was later in 1939. However, in a 1997 interview, the student body president from 1935 claimed the Husky mascot selection was a direct reference to the Yukon / UConn homophone. The university and its athletics programs officially rebranded themselves as "UConn" in the spring of 2013.

=== Conference history ===
UConn's teams participate in the NCAA's Division I and in the Big East Conference for all sports except football and men's and women's ice hockey. UConn's football team participates in the Football Bowl Subdivision.

UConn was a founding member of the Yankee Conference in 1946. The Huskies were then founding members of the original Big East Conference in 1979, and remained in that conference when it reorganized as the American Athletic Conference in 2013. In 2020, UConn joined the new Big East Conference, reuniting it with many of the schools against which it played for over three decades in the original Big East. The football team competes as an FBS independent team.

The club alpine skiing team competes in the United States Collegiate Ski and Snowboard Association because of a stricter limit on NCAA skiing programs.

== Sports teams ==
Men's sports	Women's sports
Baseball	Basketball
Basketball	Cross country
Football	Field hockey
Ice hockey	Lacrosse
Golf	Ice hockey
Soccer	Rowing
Track & field^{1}	Soccer
	Softball
	Swimming & diving
	Tennis
	Track & field^{1}
	Volleyball
^{1} – includes both indoor and outdoor.

=== Men's basketball ===
Before the school gained "Blue Blood" status, UConn's men's basketball was once a regional power, winning 18 Yankee Conference championships between 1947 and 1975, including 12 by Hugh Greer. In 1979, UConn was one of the seven founding schools of the American Athletic Conference (then known as the Big East Conference), which was originally created to focus on basketball, and the last remaining school that signed the charter to remain following the 2013 split. In the early days of the Big East, UConn struggled behind national powers Georgetown and Syracuse. Prior to the 1986–87 season UConn hired Jim Calhoun to be the program's new head coach, but the Huskies difficulties continued and they finished the season with a record of 9–19, their fifth straight losing season. But in 1988, the team showed significant improvement and gained a berth in the NIT. UConn went on a run in the tournament and defeated Ohio State, 72–67, at Madison Square Garden to win the NIT, the school's first national basketball title.

The 1990 "Dream Season" would bring UConn basketball to the national stage. Led by Chris Smith, Nadav Henefeld and Tate George, UConn went from unranked in the preseason to winning the Big East regular season and tournament championships, both for the first time. 1990 also marked the opening of Gampel Pavilion, the program's new on-campus home. In the NCAA Tournament the Huskies garnered a No. 1 seed in the East Region, but trailed Clemson, 70–69, with 1 second remaining in the Sweet 16. Scott Burrell's full-court pass found Tate George on the far baseline. George spun, fired, and hit a buzzer-beater that is known in Connecticut simply as "The Shot". They would be eliminated on a buzzer-beater two days later by Duke, losing in overtime, 79–78.

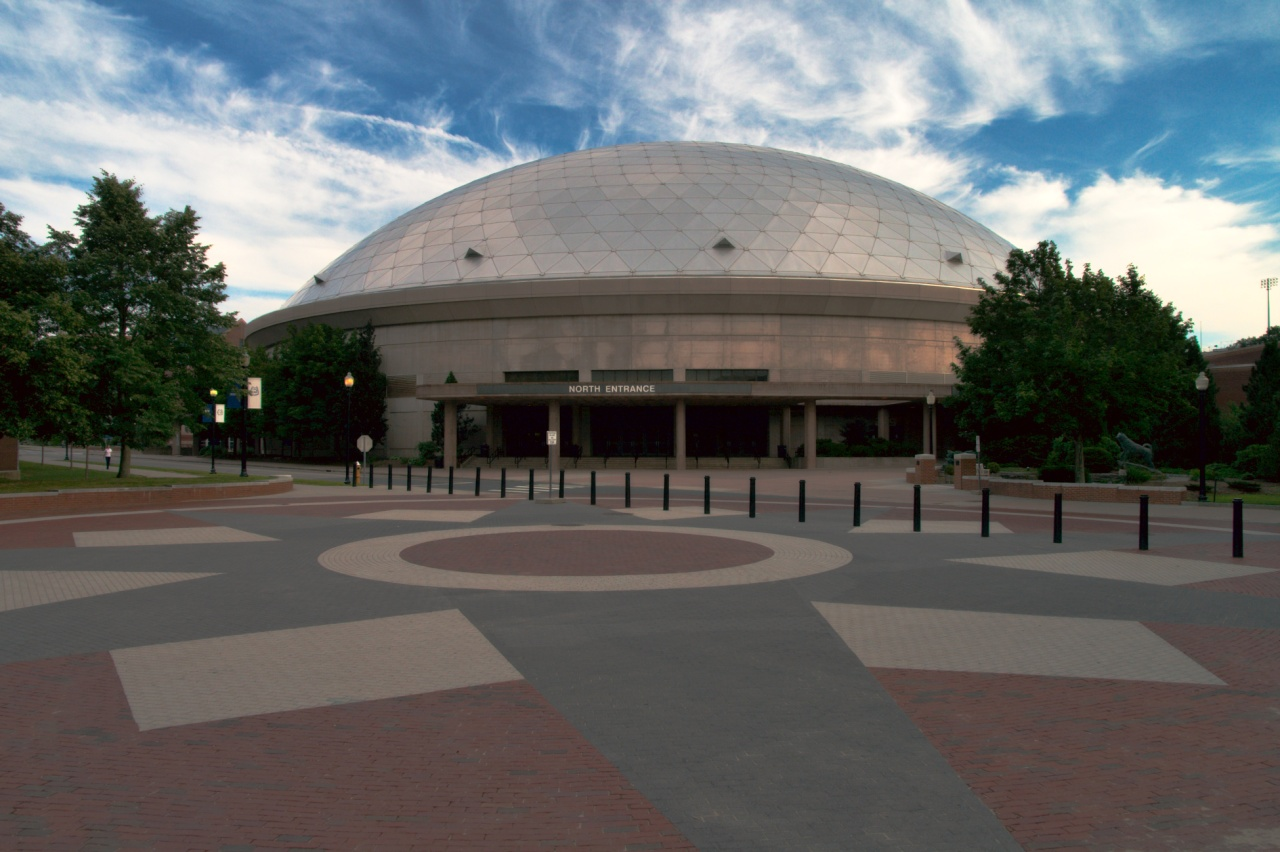
Exterior view of Gampel Pavilion

UConn rose as a national program throughout the 1990s, winning five more Big East Regular Season and three more Big East Tournament Championships, but the Final Four still eluded Calhoun and the program until the 1999 NCAA Tournament. The Huskies were the top seed in the West region and a win over Gonzaga in the regional finals sent UConn to Tropicana Field in Tampa Bay for the Final Four. They defeated Ohio State, 64–58, in the semi-final to face off against Duke in the final. Despite having been ranked No. 1 for half of the year, the Huskies entered the national championship game as 9-point underdogs. The game was tight throughout, and when the final buzzer sounded, UConn had defeated Duke, 77–74.

The 1999 national championship would not be the last. In 2004, the Huskies returned to the Final Four in San Antonio, Texas. Once again, they faced Duke, this time in the National Semifinal, and used a late run to beat the Blue Devils, 79–78. Two nights later, led by Ben Gordon and Emeka Okafor, UConn beat Georgia Tech, 82–73, to win the championship.

In 2006, UConn became the third school ever to have four players drafted in Round One of the NBA draft, and the first school ever to have five players selected in the two-round draft. In the first round, Rudy Gay, Hilton Armstrong, Marcus Williams and Josh Boone were selected. In the second round, Denham Brown was selected. Rashad Anderson also entered the NBA draft and has played for several European, Middle Eastern and NBA-D League teams since then.

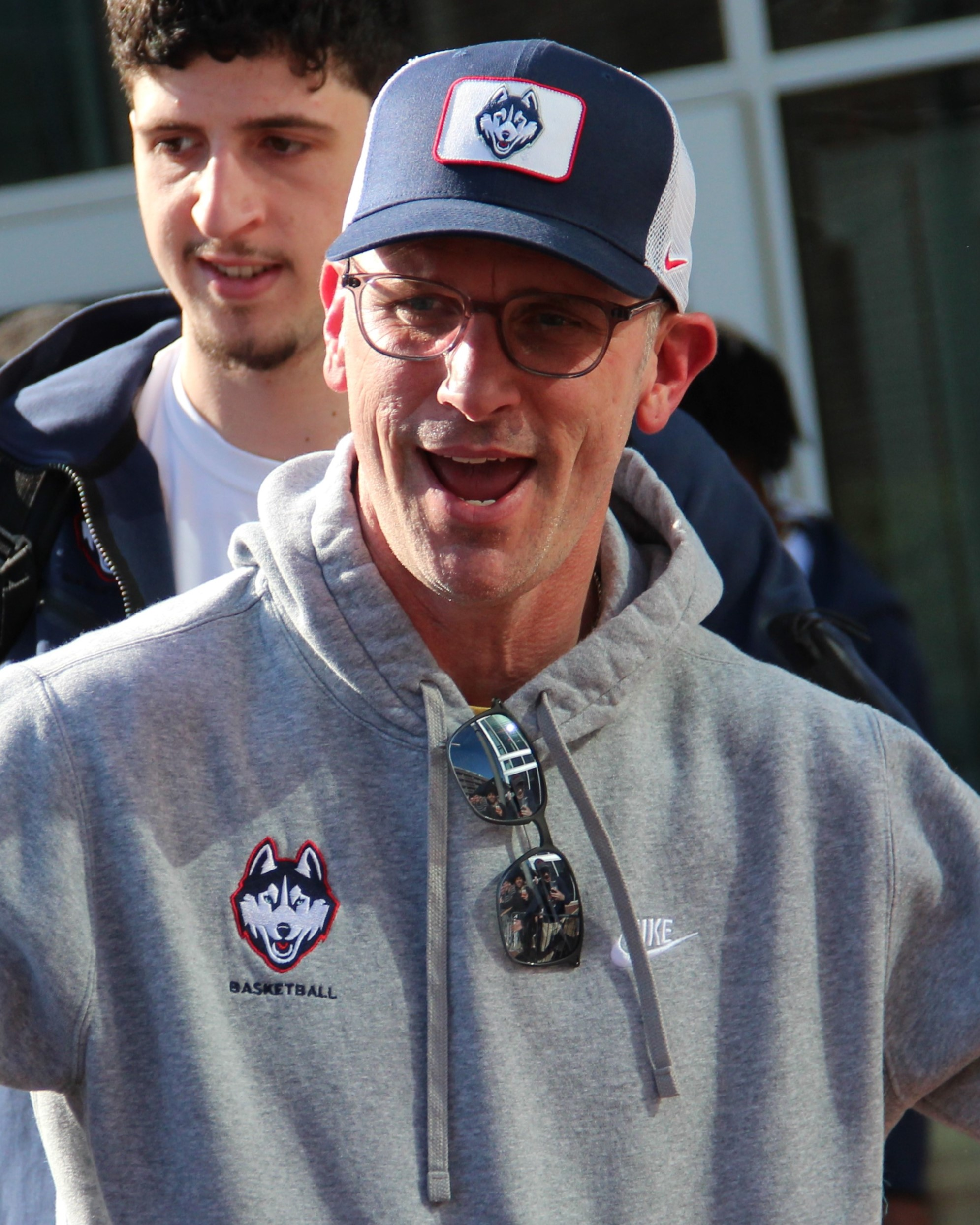
UConn coach Dan Hurley 2024.

In the 2009 NCAA Tournament, UConn was awarded the No. 1 seed in the West. Led by AJ Price, Hasheem Thabeet and Jeff Adrien, the Huskies reached the Final Four by defeating No. 16 seed Chattanooga in the 1st round, No. 9 seed Texas A&M in the 2nd round, No. 5 seed Purdue in the Sweet 16 and No. 3 seed Missouri in the Elite Eight. This marked the third time in the program's history to reach the Final Four. In the two other occurrences, UConn also came out of the West region and won the national championship on both occasions.

Connecticut returned to the NCAA tournament in 2011 after an off year. Under the leadership of Kemba Walker UConn won five consecutive games in five nights to earn the Big East Tournament championship in New York City. They headed to the NCAA as a No. 3 seed, and completed one of the most improbable runs to the Championship game, defeating Butler to earn their third National championship in a 53–41 defensive affair in Houston, Texas.

In 2014 led by American Athletic Conference Player of the Year Shabazz Napier, UConn become the first #7 seed to win the NCAA Championship, getting past No. 1 seed Florida, No. 2 seed Villanova, No. 3 seed Iowa State, and No. 4 seed Michigan State, before defeating the Kentucky Wildcats, 60–54, in the championship game in Arlington, Texas.

After returning to the Big East for the 2020–21 season, UConn won its fifth and sixth NCAA Championships in 2022–23 and 2023–24, becoming the first program to win back-to-back championships since the University of Florida in 2005–06 and 2006–07.

=== Women's basketball ===
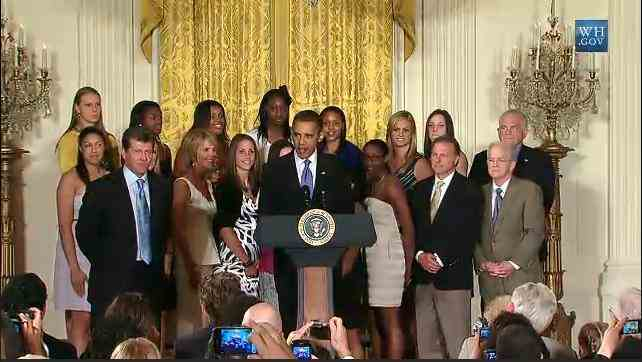
2010 NCAA National Champions Connecticut Huskies at the White House

Strong alumni, student, and fan support for UConn's men's basketball teams helped the Huskies' women's basketball program attract Geno Auriemma as head coach. Under the tutelage of Auriemma, UConn has become one of the few schools that consistently competes for the national title in women's basketball.

The Huskies were also part of one of the fiercest rivalries in all of women's college sports. In the rivalry between UConn and the University of Tennessee, there was no love lost between Auriemma and Tennessee coach Pat Summitt. The two schools have faced each other seven times in the NCAA Tournament, and four times in the NCAA Championship Game. UConn leads 5–2 in those games including a 4–0 record in the finals. UConn leads the all-time series 13–8. Summitt ended the regular season series in the summer of 2007. It is unknown why the series was ended, but media outlets reported that Tennessee reported to the NCAA that UConn committed minor recruiting infractions with the recruitment of Maya Moore which included a tour of ESPN while Moore was a junior in high school.

Rebecca Lobo, Jennifer Rizzotti, Svetlana Abrosimova, Shea Ralph, Nykesha Sales, Kelly Schumacher, Swin Cash, Kara Wolters, Tamika Williams, Diana Taurasi, Asjha Jones, Sue Bird, Ann Strother, Barbara Turner, Jessica Moore, Ashley Battle, Ketia Swanier, Charde Houston, Tina Charles, Kalana Greene, Renee Montgomery, Maya Moore, Tiffany Hayes, Bria Hartley, Stefanie Dolson, Kaleena Mosqueda-Lewis, Moriah Jefferson, Kiah Stokes, Breanna Stewart, Morgan Tuck, Kia Nurse, Gabby Williams, Azurá Stevens, Napheesa Collier, Katie Lou Samuelson, Crystal Dangerfield, Olivia Nelson-Ododa, Evina Westbrook, Christyn Williams, Dorka Juhász, Lou Lopez Sénéchal, Aaliyah Edwards, Nika Mühl, Paige Bueckers, and Kaitlyn Chen are among the women's professional basketball players or WNBA draftees who attended UConn.

In 2002, UConn became the only school ever to have four women drafted among the top 10 of the first round of the 2002 WNBA draft, with National Player of the Year Sue Bird drafted 1st, Swin Cash drafted 2nd, Asjha Jones drafted 4th, and Tamika Williams Raymond drafted 6th. The 5th starter on the UConn 2002 NCAA championship team was future No. 1 WNBA draft choice and future two-time National Player of the Year Diana Taurasi. A total of 11 UConn alumnae played in the WNBA in the 2010 season.

In 2004, UConn became the second school ever, and the first in Division I, to win the men's NCAA National Championship and the women's basketball title in the same season and did it again in 2014. It was also the first school to ever have both teams ranked number 1 in the nation at the same time (during the 1994–95 season), and has also spent the most weeks by far with both teams holding the number one spot, with Duke being the only other team ever to achieve the feat, for a short period during the 2003–04 season.

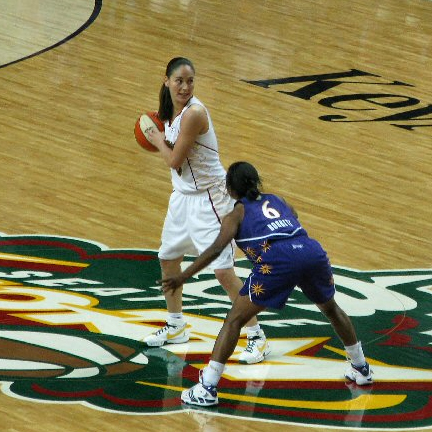
Sue Bird, on offense

In 2008, freshman Maya Moore made history by being named Big East Player of the Year, the first time a freshman was so honored in either men's or women's basketball. She was named Big East Player of the Year again in 2009.

UConn women entered the 2008–09 season ranked No. 1 in all national polls. They finished the season ranked as No. 1 as well, winning the national championship, finishing the season with a perfect 39–0 record, while winning every game by 10 points or more. At the end of the year, Maya Moore swept the National Player of the Year honors, receiving the Wooden, Wade and Naismith Awards, and she, Renee Montgomery and Tina Charles were named to various All-America teams. Coach Geno Auriemma received his record sixth recognition as the National Coach of the Year.

UConn women entered the 2009–10 season ranked No. 1 in all the national polls, and remained ranked No. 1 every week for the entire season. They finished the season as the first back-to-back undefeated National Champions, beating No. 2 Stanford at the San Antonio Alamodome. UConn also set the national consecutive victory record at 78 when it won its seventh National Championship at the Alamodome.

UConn women entered the 2010–11 season ranked No. 1 in all the national polls. On December 19, 2010, the UConn Huskies beat No. 10 ranked Ohio State at Madison Square Garden's annual Maggie Dixon Classic to tie the NCAA consecutive win streak to 88 games, and on December 21, 2010, they beat No. 20 ranked Florida State at the XL Center in Hartford to set a new NCAA consecutive win record at 89 games, the streak ended at 90 on December 30, 2010, with a 71–59 loss at Stanford.

UConn is not only a pipeline to both the NBA and the WNBA, but to coaching ranks throughout the sport of basketball. UConn alumnae in the coaching ranks include head coaches Jennifer Rizzotti at the University of Hartford, Jamelle Elliott at the University of Cincinnati, Tonya Cardoza at Temple University, Carla Berube at Princeton University, Shea Ralph at Vanderbilt University, and Tamika Williams-Jeter at University of Dayton, and assistant coaches Stacy Hansmeyer at the University of Oklahoma, Morgan Valley at the University of Washington and Willnett Crockett at Temple. Mel Thomas is the Director of Basketball Operations at Florida Gulf Coast University.

Eight American female basketball players have attained the Triple Crown "plus one" — an NCAA national title, a WNBA title, a World Cup gold medal, and an Olympic gold medal. Of those eight, six are UConn alumnae: Sue Bird, Swin Cash, Kara Wolters, Diana Taurasi, Tina Charles, and Breanna Stewart.

=== Football ===
UConn football started in 1896. The program's progression lead to an undefeated season in 1924. Four players who attended UConn that year went on to play in the NFL, with one winning a world title with the Providence Steamrollers in 1928. Two played for the Hartford Blues alongside the Four Horsemen, former members of 1924 national champions, the University of Notre Dame.

UConn football reached Division I-A status in 2000, was included in official Division I-A statistics for the first time in 2002, and became a full Big East member in 2004. UConn has been recognized as having the fastest progression out of I-AA in NCAA history, as it was invited into a BCS conference only two years after becoming a full I-A member, was bowl-eligible in its first season in I-A, and was invited to a bowl game in its first season as a conference member. The Huskies defeated the University of Toledo in the 2004 Motor City Bowl by a score of 39–10, with quarterback Dan Orlovsky being named Most Valuable Player. In 2003, the team was also honored for being one of only 7 schools in the U.S. to graduate 80% or better of its members; it was the only public school on the list. In 2007, the Huskies had their best year as they went 9–3, finished 7–0 at home and earned a berth in the 2007 Meineke Car Care Bowl, where they were defeated by Wake Forest, 24–10. In 2008, the Huskies finished 7–5 and defeated Buffalo in the 2009 International Bowl in Toronto.

During the 2009–2010 football season, cornerback Jasper Howard was stabbed to death on campus after celebrating the win early that day against the Louisville Cardinals. UConn honored Jasper for the remainder of 2009 and 2010, which would have been his senior year. The Huskies would defeat SEC opponent South Carolina in the 2010 PapaJohns.com Bowl. The next year, Connecticut made its first major bowl by winning the Big East Conference and going to the 2011 Fiesta Bowl, though it struggled after the move to the AAC and became an independent school in the sport in 2019 as the school transitioned to the current Big East (which does not sponsor football) in most sports. In 2020, UConn canceled its 2020 football season due to the COVID-19 pandemic.

=== Baseball ===
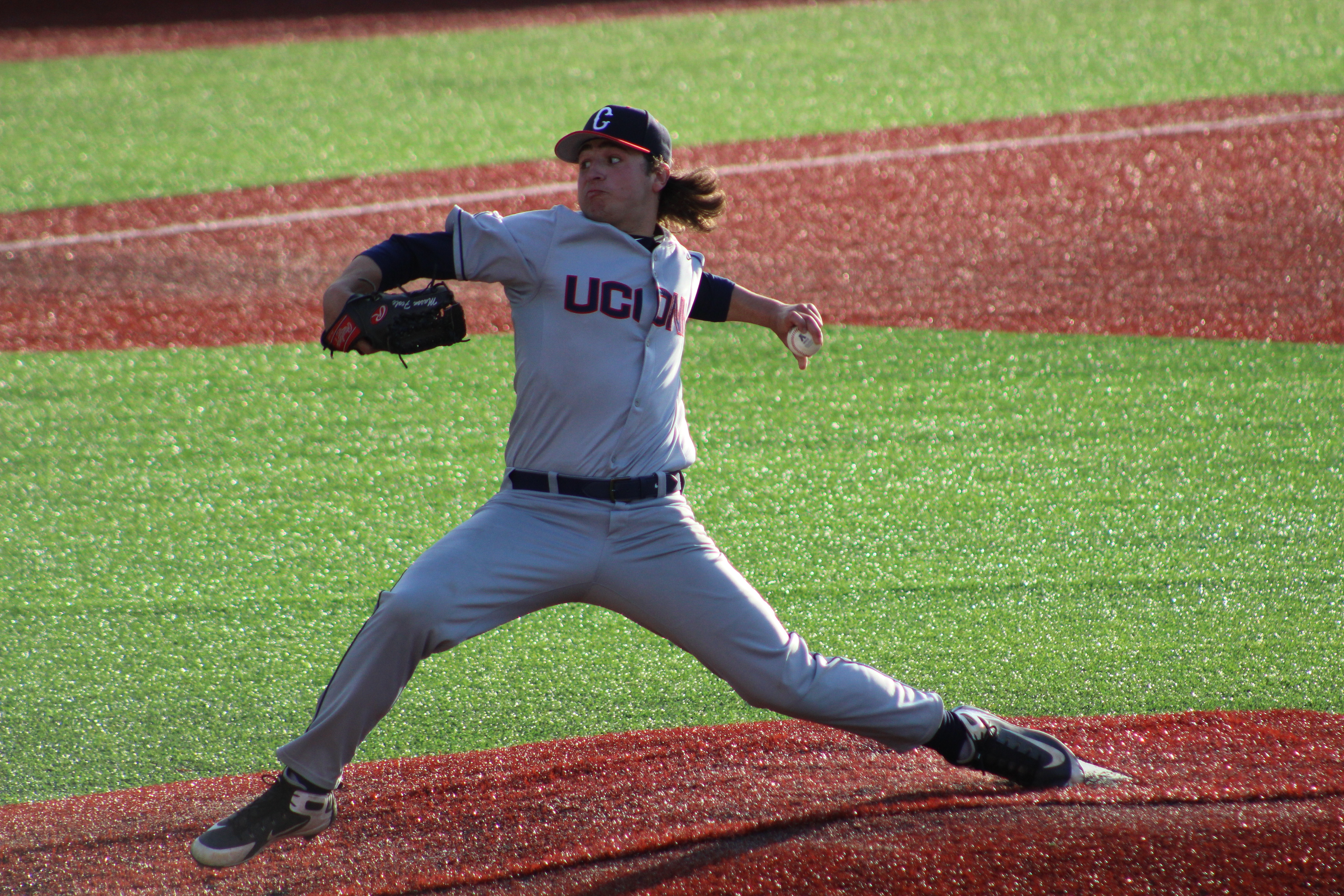
Mason Feole pitching for UConn in 2018

The UConn baseball team is coached by Jim Penders and plays home games at Elliot Ballpark.

In 2010, the UConn baseball team set a program record for wins in a season with 48. This eclipsed the previous mark of 39. The team played as the No. 2 seed alongside No. 1 Florida State (ACC), No. 3 Oregon (Pac-10), and No. 4 Central Connecticut State (NEC). The Huskies placed third in the regional with a 1–2 and played in front of 5,684 fans in their Friday opener against Oregon. The team finished the season ranked 22nd in the National Collegiate Baseball Writers Association poll, 23rd in the USA Today/ESPN Coaches poll and 28th in the Collegiate Baseball Newspaper poll.

In the summer of 2010, Huskies George Springer and Matt Barnes were named to the Collegiate USA National Team. Also, four players were named to their respective collegiate summer league All-Star teams- John Sulzicki of the Butler BlueSox (Prospect League), Greg Nappo of the Haymarket Senators (Valley Baseball League), Billy Ferriter of the North Fork Ospreys (Hamptons Collegiate Baseball), and Michael Zaccardo of the Riverhead Tomcats (Hamptons Collegiate Baseball).

In 2011, UConn baseball was ranked 1st in the Big East Conference preseason poll. George Springer and Matt Barnes were named preseason Big East Player and Pitcher of the Year, respectively. The team advanced to the first Super Regional in program history, spoiling a potential Super Regional derby by defeating ACC powerhouse Clemson at Doug Kingsmore Stadium in winning the Clemson regional. In the Super Regional, the chances of a Palmetto Double Sweep were ended by eventual champion South Carolina.

In 2013, UConn baseball became the first 8 seed to win the Big East Tournament. UConn knocked off the 1 seed Louisville 3–2 in ten innings in the opening game, came back from a 7–0 deficit to beat South Florida 8–7, beat Rutgers 2–1 in the semifinals, and beat Notre Dame 8–1 for the championship.

=== Men's cross country/track and field ===
Head Coach: Beth Alford-Sullivan
American Athletic Conference Indoor Track and Field Championships: (1) 2014
American Athletic Conference Outdoor Track and Field Championships: (1) 2015
Penn Relays Championship of America Titles: (1) 2000
Big East Indoor Track and Field Championships: (9) 1987, 1997, 2002, 2004, 2006, 2008, 2009, 2011, 2013
Big East Outdoor Track and Field Championships: (4) 1982, 2002, 2011, 2013
Big East Relay Championships: 2
All-Americans: 32

=== Women's cross country/track and field ===
Head Coach: JJ Clark
Olympians: 1 (in women's bobsled)
Big East Indoor Track and Field Championships: (2) 2008, 2009
Big East Outdoor Track and Field Championships: (1) 1995
NCAA All-Americans: 9

=== Field hockey ===
Playing facility: George J. Sherman Sports Complex
Head Coach: Paul Caddy
Most victories: 23 in 1999, 23 in 2017.
NCAA Tournament appearances: 26
NCAA National Championships: (5) 1981, 1985, 2013, 2014, 2017
NCAA Runner-Up: (2) 1982, 1983
Final Fours: (15) 1981, 1982, 1983, 1984, 1985, 1998, 1999, 2006, 2007, 2011, 2013, 2014, 2015, 2016, 2017
Big East Regular Season Championships: (18) 1996, 1997, 1998, 1999, 2000, 2002, 2003, 2004, 2005, 2007, 2008, 2011, 2013, 2014, 2015, 2016, 2020, 2021, 2024
Big East Tournament Championships: (17) 1992, 1996, 1998, 1999, 2000, 2002, 2004, 2005, 2006, 2007, 2009, 2012, 2013, 2014, 2015, 2016, 2020, 2024
All-Americans: 46
Olympians: 2

=== Men's golf ===
Head Coach: Dave Pezzino
NCAA appearances: (1) 1980
Big East Championships: (1) 1994, 2021

=== Men's ice hockey ===
On June 21, 2012, Connecticut announced the program would join Hockey East as the conference's 12th member beginning in the 2014–15 season. As part of the move from Atlantic Hockey to Hockey East, the university added 18 scholarships for the men's ice hockey team and additional scholarships to existing women's sports programs to meet Title IX gender equity requirements. The university was also investigating options to build a new, larger ice arena on-campus as its then-current venue, the Freitas Ice Forum, has a seating capacity of only 2,000 and was too small for the jump up to Hockey East. Since then, UConn has used the PeoplesBank Arena, a former NHL venue in downtown Hartford, as its primary men's home. While the arena has a hockey capacity of 15,635, UConn has capped ticket sales at 8,089. Select home games have also been played at the Total Mortgage Arena in Bridgeport.

UConn opened a new on-campus arena for the 2023–24 season. The new facility, known as the Toscano Family Ice Forum, is adjacent to the former Freitas Forum. Both the men's and women's teams moved to the new arena, which seats 2,600 and meets all NCAA Division I requirements. In 2024–25, the Huskies clinched a spot in the NCAA Tournament for the first in program history.

=== Women's ice hockey ===
Playing facility: Toscano Family Ice Forum
Head Coach: Christopher MacKenzie
Most wins: 22 in 2007–08
NCAA Tournament Appearances (1): 2024
Hockey East Regular Season Championships (2): 2024, 2025
Hockey East Tournament Championships (2): 2024, 2026

=== Women's lacrosse ===
Playing facility: Joseph J. Morrone Stadium at the Rizza Performance Center
Head Coach: Katie Woods
Most wins: 13 in 2013
NCAA Tournament appearances: (4) 2013, 2021, 2022, 2023
ECAC Championships: (1) 2006
All-Americans: 9

=== Women's rowing ===
Home surface: Coventry Lake
Head Coach: Jennifer Sanford

=== Men's soccer ===
In addition to its basketball success, UConn is known for its championship soccer teams. The men's team has won two NCAA national championships, in 1981 and 2000, and the National Soccer Coaches Association of America named the undefeated 1948 team the national champion. The 2000 team was known for its stellar depth on the bench including the likes of Garrett Grinsfelder, Michael Rueda, and Ryan Brown, who exuded the team's "never say die" attitude. The men's team won back to back Big East championships in (2004 and 2005). As of 2011 UConn led the nation in total attendance in eight of the preceding 12 seasons. No program can match it for having drawn better on-campus support for more than 30 years. In the early 1980s, before the NCAA kept soccer attendance records and before Morrone Stadium was downsized, the Huskies drew huge crowds. Total attendance in 1983 was 64,535—a record that held until 2010. Major League Soccer players Maurizio Rocha, Chris Gbandi, Damani Ralph, Bobby Rhine, Julius James, Shavar Thomas, O'Brian White, Kwame Watson-Siriboe, Toni Ståhl, Cyle Larin, Chukwudi Chijindu, Andre Blake, and Kieran Chandler each attended UConn.

=== Women's soccer ===
Playing facility: Joseph J. Morrone Stadium at the Rizza Performance Center
Head Coach: Margaret Tietjen Rodriguez
Most victories: 23 in 1997
NCAA Tournament appearances: 29
Last NCAA appearance: 2024
NCAA Championship Game appearances: (4) 1984, 1990, 1997, 2003
College Cups: (7) 1982, 1983, 1984, 1990, 1994, 1997, 2003
All-Americans: 26 Players Awarded 44 Times
Big East Regular Season Championships: (8) 1995, 1998, 1999, 2000, 2001, 2002, 2003, 2005
Big East Tournament Championships: (3) 2002, 2004, 2024
All-Big East Selections: 81

=== Softball ===
Playing facility: Burrill Family Field at the Connecticut Softball Complex
Head Coach: Laura Valentino
Most victories: 45 in 1993
Women's College World Series appearances: (1) 1993
Big East Regular Season Championships: (6) 1992, 1993, 1994, 1995, 1996, 1997
Big East Tournament Championships: (7) 1990, 1991, 1992, 1993, 1995, 1996, 2001
All-Americans: 47

=== Men's and women's swimming & diving ===
Playing facility: Wolf-Zackin Natatorium
Head Coaches: Swimming – Chris Maiello | Diving – John Bransfield
Big East Champions: 5
Olympians: 1

=== Men's tennis ===
Playing facility: UConn Tennis Courts
Head Coach: Glenn Marshall
Most victories: 20 in 2000

=== Women's tennis ===
Playing facility: UConn Tennis Courts
Head Coach: Glenn Marshall
Most victories: 14 in 2002

=== Women's volleyball ===
Playing facility: UConn Volleyball Center
Head Coach: Ellen Herman-Kimball
Most victories: 35 in 1979
Big East Regular Season Championships (2): 1994 & 1998

== Championships ==
=== NCAA team championships ===
Connecticut has won 25 NCAA team national championships.

- Men's (8)
  - Basketball (6): 1999, 2004, 2011, 2014, 2023, 2024
  - Soccer (2): 1981, 2000
- Women's (17)
  - Basketball (12): 1995, 2000, 2002, 2003, 2004, 2009, 2010, 2013, 2014, 2015, 2016, 2025
  - Field Hockey (5): 1981, 1985, 2013, 2014, 2017
- see also:
  - Big East NCAA team championships
  - List of NCAA schools with the most NCAA Division I championships

=== Other national team championships ===
Below are two national team titles that were not bestowed by the NCAA:

- Men's
  - Soccer (1948)
- Women's
  - Rugby (1993)

== Facilities ==
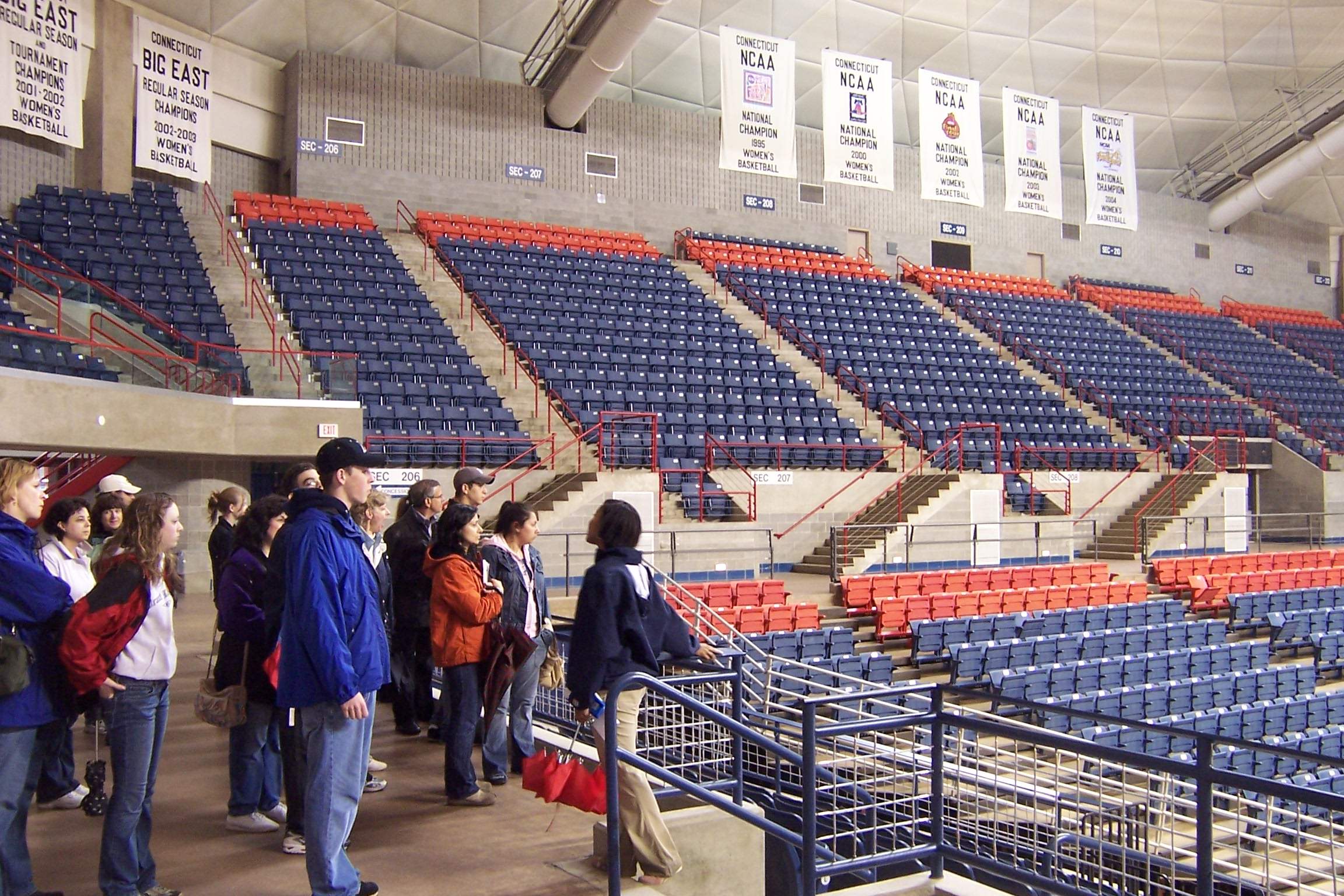
Gampel Pavilion: A prospective student tour group is shown the women's basketball championship banners.

The university's notable athletic facilities include:

- Harry A. Gampel Pavilion on the main campus in Storrs, the regular home for both men's and women's basketball.
- Toscano Family Ice Forum, on the main campus in Storrs, the regular home for both men's and women's ice hockey.
- Pratt & Whitney Stadium at Rentschler Field in East Hartford, home to the football team.
- PeoplesBank Arena in Hartford, the second home for both basketball teams and the secondary venue of the men's ice hockey team.
- Joseph J. Morrone Stadium on the main campus in Storrs, the regular home for both men's and women's soccer and lacrosse.
- Elliot Ballpark on the main campus in Storrs, home for baseball.
- Burton Family Football Complex on the main campus in Storrs, serves as the on-campus home of UConn football and complements Rentschler Field in East Hartford; opened in 2006.
- Mark R. Shenkman Training Center on the main campus in Storrs, adjacent to the Burton Family Football Complex, serves as a home to UConn club and intramural sports. Facilities include "an 85,000-square-foot (7,900 m^{2}) training complex, featuring a 120-yard long state-of-the-art FieldTurf playing surface, an 18,000-square-foot (1,700 m^{2}) strength and conditioning area, and state-of-the-art video capabilities, the indoor training center provides UConn's football team with the most technologically advanced training equipment".

== Pageantry ==
Mascot: Jonathan the Husky
Outfitter: Nike
Marching band: University of Connecticut Marching Band, known as "The Pride of Connecticut"
Fight songs: "UConn Husky" and "Fight On Connecticut"
