= Stephen Woods Jr. =

American baseball player (born 1995)

Staten Island FerryHawks – No. 28
- Pitcher
- Born: June 10, 1995 (age 31); Huntington, New York, U.S.
- Bats: Right Throws: Right

CPBL debut
- August 2, 2023, for the Fubon Guardians

CPBL statistics (through 2023 season)
- Win–loss record: 0–2
- Earned run average: 12.54
- Strikeouts: 3
- Stats at Baseball Reference

Teams
- Fubon Guardians (2023)

Stephen Hugo Woods Jr. (born June 10, 1995) is an American professional baseball pitcher for the Staten Island FerryHawks of the Atlantic League of Professional Baseball. He has previously played in the Chinese Professional Baseball League (CPBL) for the Fubon Guardians.

== Amateur career ==
Woods attended Half Hollow Hills East High School in Dix Hills, New York. While pitching for the school's baseball team in 2013, he threw two consecutive no-hitters.

The Tampa Bay Rays selected Woods in the sixth round of the 2013 MLB draft, but he did not sign with the Rays. He enrolled at State University of New York at Albany, and played college baseball for the Albany Great Danes. In the summer of 2014, he played collegiate summer baseball for the North Fork Ospreys of the Hamptons Collegiate Baseball League, and in the summer of 2015 he played for the Wareham Gatemen of the Cape Cod Baseball League.

== Professional career ==
=== San Francisco Giants ===
After his junior year, the San Francisco Giants selected Woods in the eighth round of the 2016 Major League Baseball draft. Woods signed with the Giants rather than return to Albany for his senior year. He spent his first professional season with both the Arizona League Giants and the Low-A Salem-Keizer Volcanoes, posting a combined 1–2 record and 3.34 ERA in 35 total innings. In 2017, he played for the Single-A Augusta GreenJackets, going 6–7 with a 2.95 ERA in 110 innings.

=== Tampa Bay Rays ===
On December 20, 2017, the Giants traded Woods, Denard Span, Christian Arroyo, and Matt Krook to the Tampa Bay Rays in exchange for Evan Longoria and cash considerations. He did not pitch in 2018 due to injury. Woods returned to pitch in 2019, spending the year with the High-A Charlotte Stone Crabs and compiling a 9–3 record with a 1.88 ERA over 18 games (12 starts), striking out 79 over 86 1/3 innings.

=== Kansas City Royals ===
On December 12, 2019, Woods was selected by the Kansas City Royals in the 2019 Rule 5 draft. On July 21, 2020, Woods was returned to the Rays organization, but was traded back to the Royals the same day in exchange for a player to be named later. The Royals sent outfielder Michael Gigliotti to Tampa Bay on September 12 as the PTBNL. He did not play a minor league game in 2020 since the season was cancelled due to the COVID-19 pandemic. He was assigned to the Double-A Northwest Arkansas Naturals to begin the 2021 season.

Woods split the 2022 campaign between Northwest Arkansas and the Triple-A Omaha Storm Chasers, accumulating a 4.28 ERA with 75 strikeouts across 41 relief appearances. He elected free agency following the season on November 10, 2022.

=== Long Island Ducks ===
On April 5, 2023, Woods signed with the Long Island Ducks of the Atlantic League of Professional Baseball. He was named the ALPB Co–Pitcher of the Month for April/May alongside Mitch Lambson of the Southern Maryland Blue Crabs. Woods made 11 total starts for the Ducks, registering a 7–2 record and 3.77 ERA with 60 strikeouts in 59 2/3 innings pitched.

=== Fubon Guardians ===
On July 5, 2023, Woods's contract was purchased by the Fubon Guardians of the Chinese Professional Baseball League. In 3 starts for Fubon, he struggled to an 0–2 record and 12.54 ERA with 3 strikeouts across 9 1/3 innings pitched. On August 30, Woods was released by the Guardians.

=== Long Island Ducks (second stint) ===
On March 26, 2024, Woods signed with the Long Island Ducks of the Atlantic League of Professional Baseball. In 16 starts for Long Island, he compiled a 5-5 record and 5.29 ERA with 82 strikeouts over 80 innings of work. Woods became a free agent following the season.

On July 7, 2025, Woods revealed that he had been injured in a car crash during the 2024 season, and would miss the 2025 campaign after undergoing surgery.

=== Staten Island FerryHawks ===
On April 18, 2026, Woods Jr signed with the Staten Island FerryHawks of the Atlantic League of Professional Baseball.

== International career ==
Woods played for the Italy national baseball team at the 2023 World Baseball Classic.

== See also ==
- Rule 5 draft results
