= Evan Longoria =

American baseball player (born 1985)

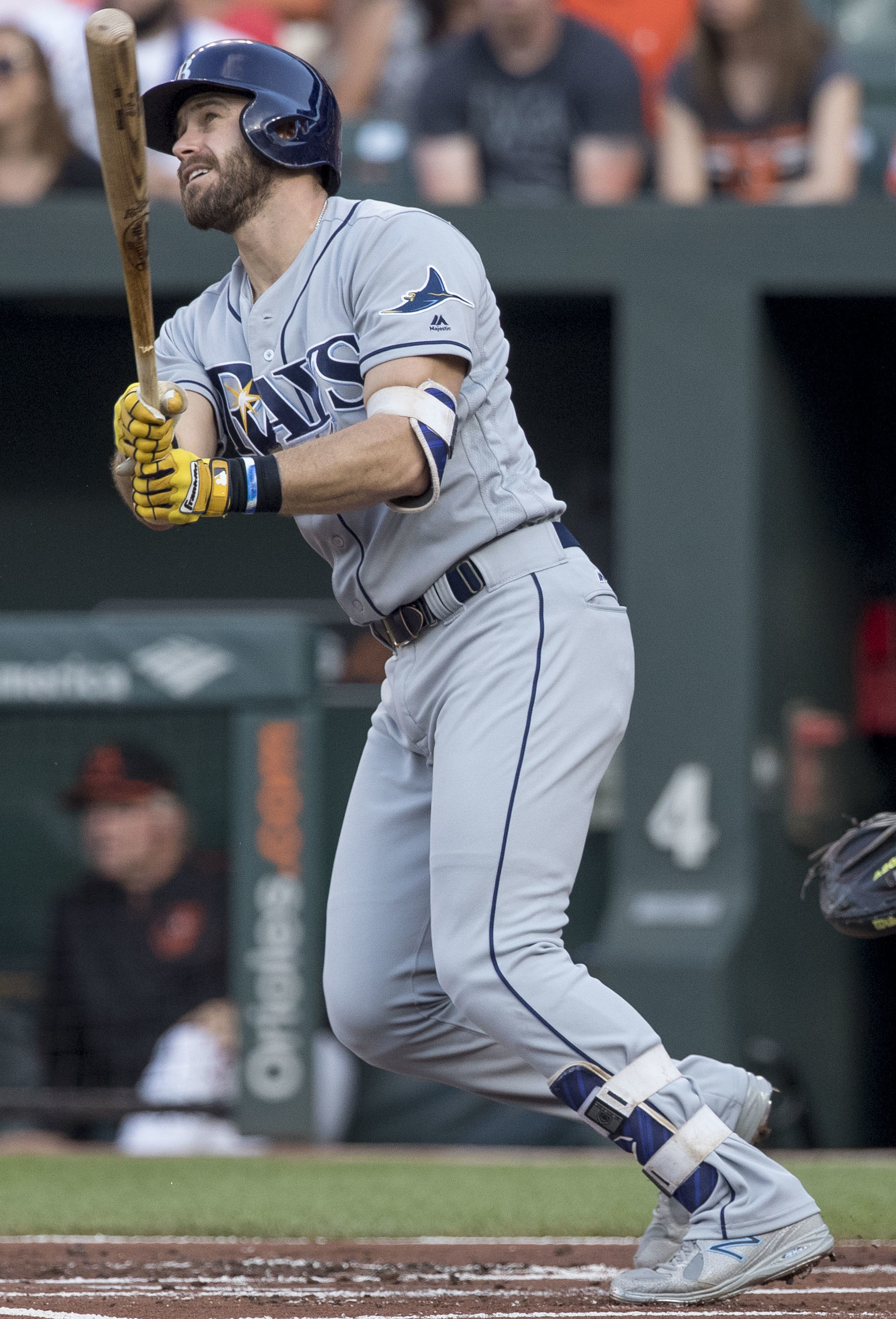
- Longoria with the Tampa Bay Rays in 2017
- Third baseman
- Born: October 7, 1985 (age 41); Downey, California, U.S.
- Batted: Right Threw: Right

MLB debut
- April 12, 2008, for the Tampa Bay Rays

Last MLB appearance
- October 1, 2023, for the Arizona Diamondbacks

MLB statistics
- Batting average: .264
- Home runs: 342
- Runs batted in: 1,159
- Stats at Baseball Reference

Teams
- Tampa Bay Rays (2008–2017); San Francisco Giants (2018–2022); Arizona Diamondbacks (2023)

Career highlights and awards
- 3× All-Star (2008–2010); AL Rookie of the Year (2008); 3× Gold Glove Award (2009, 2010, 2017); Silver Slugger Award (2009); Tampa Bay Rays No. 3 retired; Tampa Bay Rays Hall of Fame
Medals
Men's baseball
Representing United States
Baseball World Cup
Gold medal – first place	2007 Tianmu	Team

Evan Michael Longoria (born October 7, 1985), nicknamed "Longo", is an American former professional baseball third baseman who played 16 seasons in Major League Baseball (MLB) for the Tampa Bay Rays, San Francisco Giants, and Arizona Diamondbacks.

Longoria played college baseball for the Long Beach State Dirtbags, winning the CSN Bay Area 2005 Cape Cod League MVP and 2006 Big West Conference Co-Player of the Year. He was selected by the Rays in the first round as the third overall pick in the 2006 MLB draft. After two seasons in the minors, he made his major league debut for the Rays in 2008, and was named to the American League team for the 2008 MLB All Star Game. Longoria was also named the 2008 American League Rookie of the Year. He made the All-Star team three times, being selected from 2008 to 2010. Longoria appeared in two World Series, first with the Rays during his rookie season in 2008, and later with the Diamondbacks during his final season in 2023. The 15-season gap between Longoria's two World Series appearances is the longest for a position player in MLB history. He had one of the biggest hits in Rays' history when he hit a 12th-inning walk-off home run in the last game of the 2011 season, breaking a tie with the Boston Red Sox in the race for the American League wild card spot, and sending his team into the postseason.

Longoria was known for his acrobatic defense, having won three Gold Glove Awards at third base, in 2009, 2010, and 2017. Longoria owns many Rays franchise records, including the career records for games played, runs, doubles, home runs, runs batted in, walks, and Wins Above Replacement, and is thus often considered the best player in the franchise's history.

== Early life ==
Longoria was born on October 7, 1985, in Downey, California. His father is of Mexican descent, and his mother is of Ukrainian descent. He attended St. Raymond Catholic School in Downey, California, which did not have a baseball team. He graduated from Saint John Bosco High School in Bellflower, California. He was a two-year letterman in baseball, and as a senior was a first team All-League selection. Longoria did not receive any scholarship offers to play college baseball.

The University of Southern California was the only program to consider him, but eventually backed out of recruiting him. At 6 feet 1 inch (1.85 m) and 170 pounds (77 kg), many baseball recruiters felt Longoria was too slim by NCAA Division I baseball standards. As a result, he attended Rio Hondo Community College during his freshman season, before Long Beach State offered him a scholarship.

== College career ==
After high school, Longoria attended Rio Hondo Community College, where he played shortstop. In his freshman season, Longoria earned first-team All-State honors and was offered a scholarship by Long Beach State University. He transferred to Long Beach for his sophomore year and hit .320, earning All-Conference honors. Because Long Beach State already had an established shortstop, Troy Tulowitzki (who became a five-time all-star over a 13-year MLB career), Longoria played third base.

Following a successful MVP summer in 2005 in the Cape Cod League with the Chatham A's where he played second base, Longoria shared the Big West Conference Player of the Year honors (with Justin Turner) during his junior year at Long Beach State. When he first started attending Long Beach State University, he majored in kinesiology. However, he switched to the department of criminal justice because it was somewhat less time-consuming and, therefore, would not interfere with the baseball schedule as much.

In just two years, Longoria transformed his thin stature into a 6-foot-2 and 210-pounds by the end of his LBSU tenure.

== Professional career ==
=== Draft and minor leagues ===
Longoria was selected by the Tampa Bay Rays as the third overall pick in the 2006 Major League Baseball draft. Longoria was called the "best pure hitter" among college players in the 2006 draft class by Baseball America. He was the highest draft selection in school history. Tampa Bay gave him a $3 million signing bonus.

After signing with the Rays, Longoria tore through his first assignments in the minor leagues. In 2006, after just eight games with the short season Single-A Hudson Valley Renegades, Longoria was promoted to the Visalia Oaks and impressed the organization with his quick success, hitting .327/.402/.618 with eight home runs and 28 RBIs in 28 games. This earned him a promotion to the Double-A Montgomery Biscuits, where he hit .267/.266/.486 with six home runs through the end of the season, and hit .345 in the postseason, including a walk-off two-run home run in the Southern League Division Playoffs to put Montgomery into the championship. He was the 2007 Most Valuable Player with the Biscuits as well as a postseason all-star. On top of that he won a player of the week award. He was widely considered the top third base prospect in the minors and one of the top prospects at any position.

Longoria followed up his successful debut with another stellar year in 2007. Starting the year with Montgomery, Longoria hit .307/.403/.528 with 21 home runs and 76s RBI in 105 games for the Biscuits before a late-season promotion to the Triple-A Durham Bulls. In 31 games with the Bulls, he hit .269/.398/.490 with five home runs and 19 RBIs, but also had 29 strikeouts. He finished 2007 with a combined average of .299/.402/.520, 26 home runs, 95 RBIs, 110 strikeouts, and 73 walks for an OBP of .402.

In October 2007, sportswriter Ken Rosenthal opined that Longoria "might be next season's Ryan Braun, making a rapid ascent to the majors." Some scouts in particular said that the way that the ball "explodes off his bat" reminded them of Braun. He was expected to start at third for Tampa Bay in 2008 with the move of Akinori Iwamura to second base, but ultimately failed to make the opening day roster and was optioned to Triple-A Durham. According to reports, the Rays elected to send him down to complete his development, citing his short 31-game stint in Durham and drawing comparisons to the seasons of two other highly heralded third-base prospects.

=== Tampa Bay Rays (2008–2017) ===
==== 2008 ====
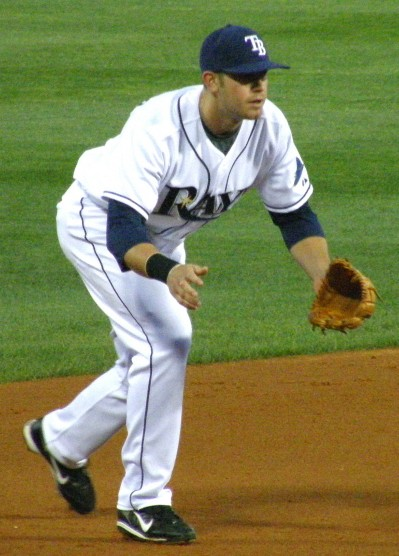
Evan Longoria in 2008

On April 12, 2008, the Rays placed Willy Aybar on the disabled list and called up Longoria from Triple-A Durham to replace him on the major league roster and on the 40-man roster. Longoria made his major league debut that night going 1-for-3 with an RBI.

Longoria hit his first career home run on April 14, against the New York Yankees at Tropicana Field. He had his first career two-homer game on May 24, and drove in six runs as the Rays defeated the Baltimore Orioles 11–4. Both of the homers came off the Orioles' Steve Trachsel, also a Long Beach State alumnus. On July 19, 2008, Longoria hit his first career grand slam off Toronto's Roy Halladay in the fifth inning as part of a 6–4 winning effort.

On April 18, the Rays signed him to a six-year, $17.5 million contract with options for 2014, 2015, and 2016. The first six years of the contract covered his arbitration years, with three more years added by team options. If the team exercised its one-year option for 2014, and then its two-year option for the 2015 and 2016 seasons, the deal could be worth up to $44 million. There was a general consensus that this contract was among the most team-friendly, in terms of dollars per Wins Above Replacement, in Major League Baseball.

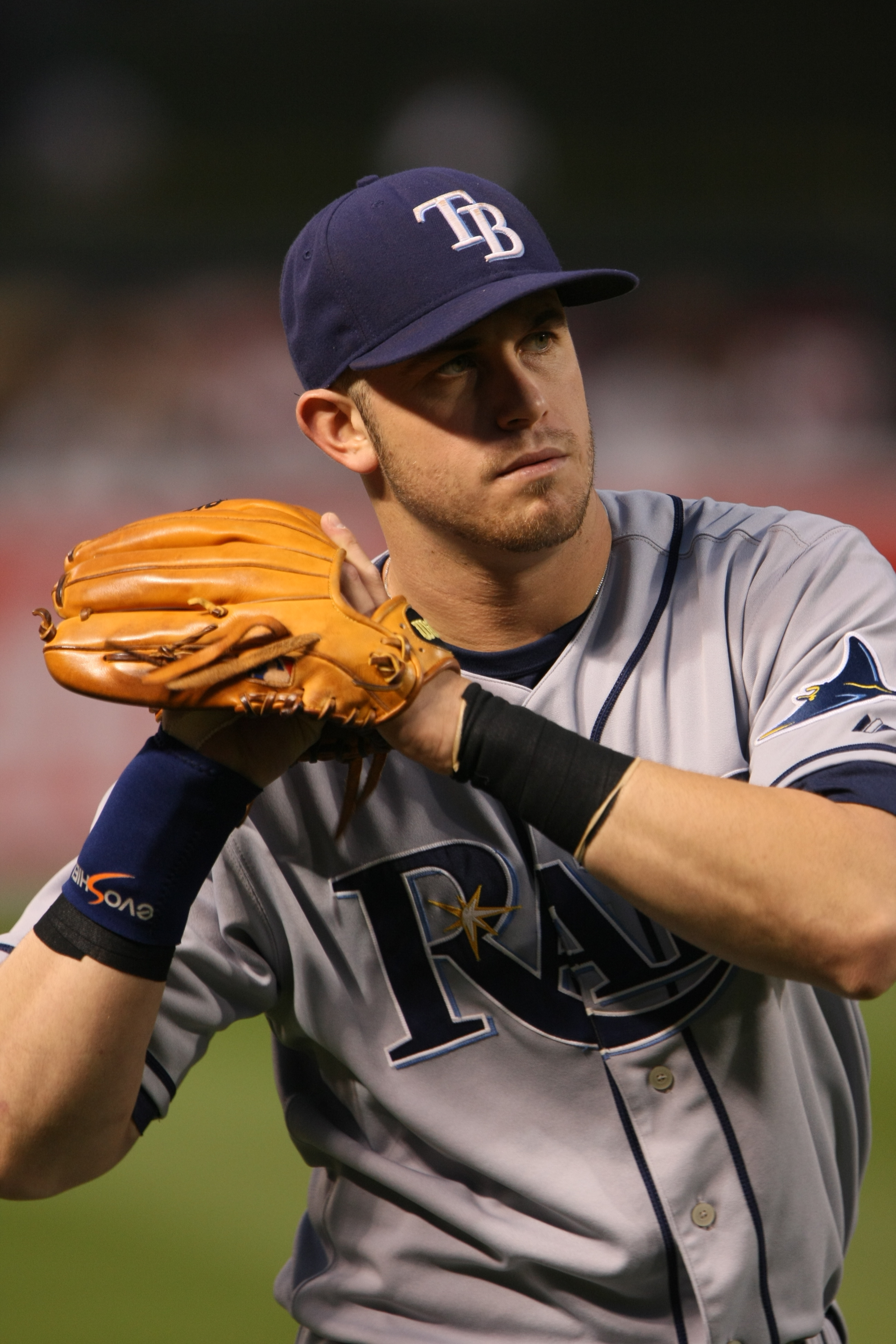
Longoria in 2008

On July 10, Longoria won the 2008 All-Star game AL Final Fan vote over outfielder Jermaine Dye of the Chicago White Sox, outfielder José Guillén of the Kansas City Royals, first baseman Jason Giambi of the New York Yankees, and second baseman Brian Roberts of the Baltimore Orioles. Longoria went 1–4 in the game and hit a game-tying ground-rule double in the bottom of the eighth inning. He also participated in the Home Run Derby that year. He hit 3 home runs. On August 11, Longoria was placed on the disabled list with a fractured wrist.

On September 18, Longoria had his first three home run game against the Minnesota Twins at Tropicana Field. On September 20, Longoria caught the game-ending out, from Joe Mauer in foul territory as the Rays clinched their first playoff spot in team history.

On October 2, in the first postseason game for both Longoria and Tampa Bay, Longoria hit two home runs in his first two at-bats to help lead the Rays past the Chicago White Sox 6–4. Longoria was the first rookie and second player overall to homer in his first two postseason at bats. The first to do so was Longoria's hitting coach at Triple-A Durham, Gary Gaetti, who did it with the Minnesota Twins in 1987.

On October 14, 2008, Longoria set the rookie mark for most home runs (4) hit in a postseason series, breaking Miguel Cabrera's record set in 2003. The Rays made it to the 2008 World Series (their first in franchise history) but were defeated by the Philadelphia Phillies.

After the 2008 season, Longoria was honored with Sporting News Rookie of the Year Award for the American League, as well as the American League Rookie of the Year Award. He became the fourth third baseman to win the award. He also became the sixth player and the first since Nomar Garciaparra in 1997 to win a Rookie of the Year Award unanimously. He was also named the third baseman on the Topps Rookie All-Star Team.

==== 2009 ====
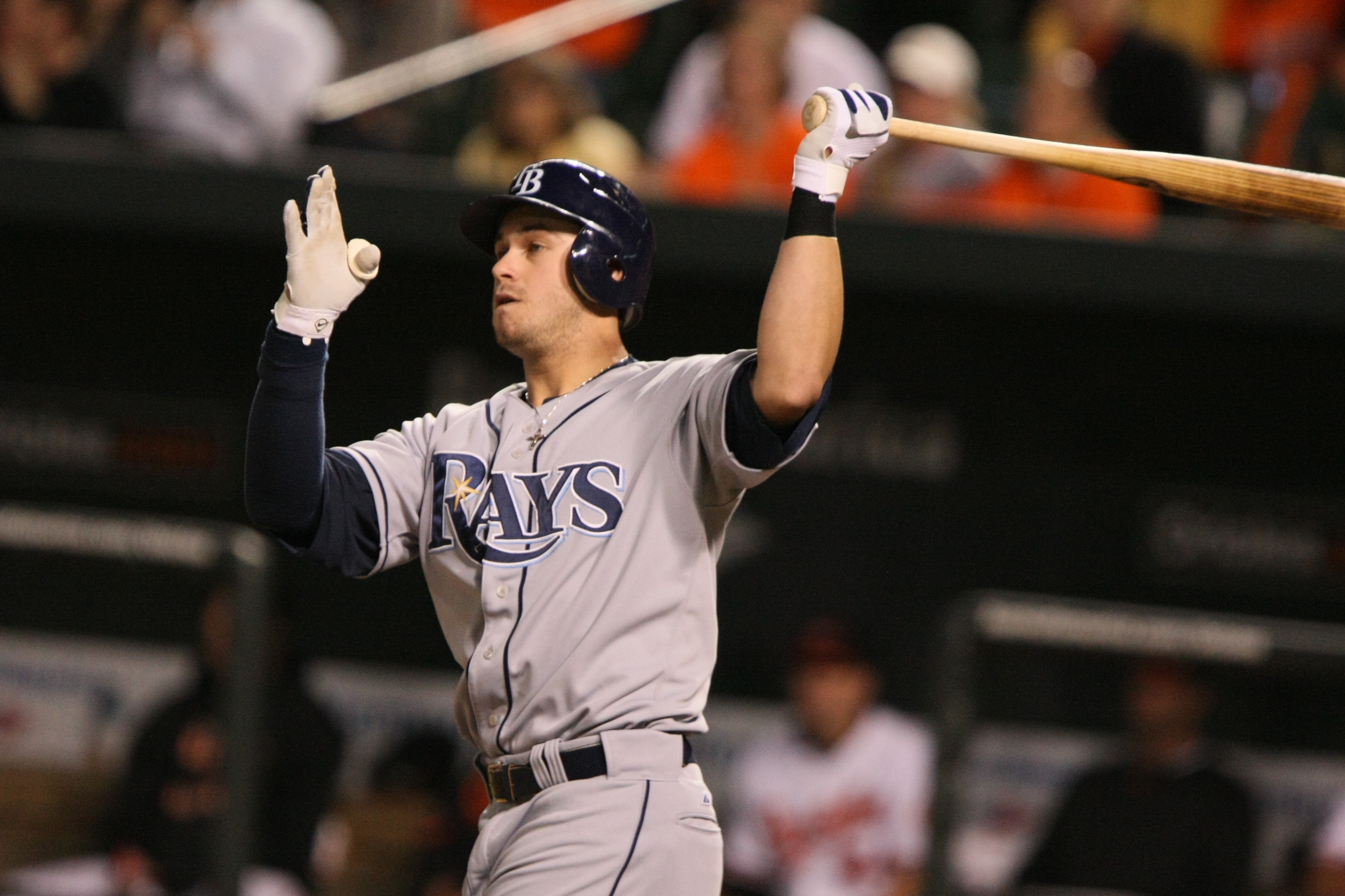
Evan Longoria in 2009

In April, Longoria knocked in his 100th career RBI, in his 135th game. The only then-active players to get to 100 RBIs more quickly were Ryan Braun (118 games) and Albert Pujols (131 games). At the end of April, Longoria became the first player in Rays franchise history to be named the AL Player of the Month. He had also won two of the four Player of the Week awards for the month of April. Longoria drove in 131 runs in his first 162 games in the majors, the third-highest total through May 2009 of any active player. Longoria was selected by the fans to start the 2009 MLB All Star Game on July 5, 2009. Due to a finger injury, he was kept out of the lineup.

Longoria won the American League Gold Glove Award for his position on November 10. Two days later, he won a Silver Slugger Award.

==== 2010 ====
In 2010, Longoria hit for the highest average of his career at .294 and was selected to play in the All Star Game for the third consecutive season. He performed well, getting a hit in his only official at-bat, in addition to having a walk and a run scored. Across the board, Longoria's 2010 season was statistically impressive, including 96 runs scored and 46 doubles as well as 5 triples. Surprisingly, though, his home run and RBI production fell from 33–113 in 2009 to 22–104 in 2010. After the season, Longoria won the Gold Glove Award at third base for the second straight year.

==== 2011 ====
During the 2011 season Longoria missed 30 games to start the year. On September 28, 2011, Longoria hit a walk-off home run in extra innings against the New York Yankees to give the Rays an 8–7 victory, and more importantly, a spot in the playoffs. Earlier in the month, the Rays were facing a deficit of nine games in the wild card race to the Boston Red Sox. However, an epic collapse of the Red Sox, where they went 7–20 in the final games of the year, and a surge of the Rays, allowed them to overtake the Red Sox and eliminate them on the final day of the regular season. Longoria's home run came just three minutes after the Red Sox suffered a walk-off loss to the Baltimore Orioles.

==== 2012 ====
"I always wanted to be kind of a benchmark player ... the guy that you could think about or associate with the organization. My goal from day one was to be the first player that played their whole career here, to be the first guy that came into the organization and went out in the organization, and played all the years in between. There's no better place for me."

— Longoria on his contract extension and his desire (eventually denied) to play his whole career in Tampa Bay.

On April 30, 2012, Longoria suffered a partially torn hamstring after sliding to second base when being caught stealing. His injury placed him on the 60-day disabled list. He missed 13 weeks and returned to the lineup on August 7, 2012. In the 85 games Longoria missed, the Rays earned a record of 41–44. The rest of the season, the Rays were 49–28, for a 63.6% winning percentage.

On October 3, 2012, Longoria finished off the 2012 season with three home runs in the final game.

On November 26, 2012, Longoria was signed to a contract extension that added six guaranteed years and $100 million to his previous contract, running through 2022 with a team option for 2023.

==== 2013 ====
On August 19, 2013, Longoria hit his 25th home run of the season, giving him his fourth 25-homer season, which tied him with Carlos Peña for the most such seasons in Tampa Bay history.

Longoria drove in his 500th career RBI after hitting a sacrifice fly vs. the New York Yankees on June 20, 2013, to plate Sean Rodriguez. He also hit two home runs in the 8–3 win.

Longoria hit two home runs on September 25, 2013, against the Yankees at Yankee Stadium. These home runs gave him No. 30 and No. 31 on the year, also giving him his third career season with 30 home runs. The Rays won the game 8–3.

During the 2013 American League Wild Card tie-breaker game vs. the Texas Rangers, Longoria hit a two-run home run in the third inning. It would eventually be the go-ahead run, giving the Rays a fourth playoff berth in franchise history.

Some of his 2013 highlights included playing in the most games of his career with 160; he missed two with a foot injury. He had a walk-off home run vs. the San Diego Padres on May 11 when the Rays were down, 6–7. It was his first walk-off home run since the Game 162 walk-off against the New York Yankees in 2011.

==== 2014 ====
The 2014 season was Longoria's seventh season as a Major League player.

On Opening Day, Longoria went 0–4, but on April 4, 2014, hit the 163rd home run of his career to tie the Rays franchise record of most home runs, a record which was held for many years by Carlos Peña.

During a 14-game stretch after his first home run, Evan had no home runs, until April 19, 2014, when Longoria hit his career homer No. 164 and claimed the all-time Rays record for home runs, passing Carlos Peña.

Longoria struggled in the first half that year, batting only .257 to go with 11 home runs and 44 RBI. On July 18, the Rays started the second half playing the Minnesota Twins after the All-Star Break (which was hosted by the Twins); in the game, Longoria had a bases clearing double which would seal the win for the Rays. On July 20 in the same series, Longoria hit a double off of Kevin Correia in the third inning, tying Carl Crawford for the franchise record in doubles with 215. In the same game, he hit his second double of the game, driving in Matt Joyce, breaking the doubles record held by Crawford, along with tying the Rays' all-time RBI mark, also held by Crawford, at 592.

Facing St. Louis Cardinals reliever Jason Motte two days later, Longoria hit a solo home run off a 1–1 fastball, making Longoria the team's all-time RBI leader.

==== 2015 ====
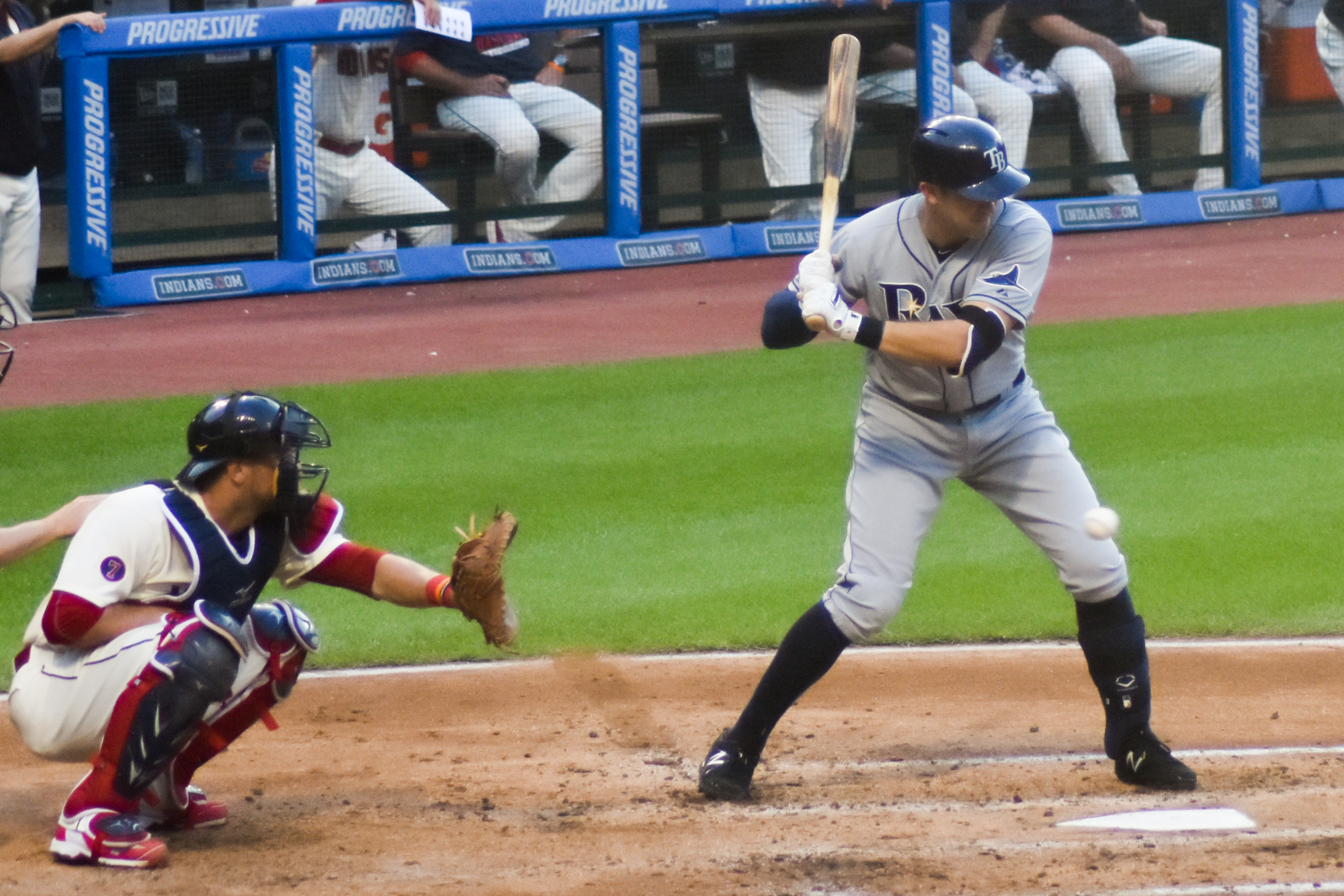
Longoria at bat for the Rays in 2015

On September 2, Longoria hit his 200th career home run. Longoria finished the season with a .270 average, 21 home runs, and 73 runs batted in over 160 games played. Longoria was also a finalist for the Gold Glove Award at third base for the American League.

==== 2016 ====
Longoria came out of the gate swinging, belting 19 first half home runs with a .526 slugging percentage. His first half performance earned him a spot in the 2016 All-Star Final Vote. In the end, the four time All-Star would lose out to Michael Saunders of the Toronto Blue Jays.

For the second consecutive year, Longoria appeared in all but two of the Rays regular season games. He would finish 2016 hitting .273/.318/.521 with a career-high 36 home runs and 98 RBIs over 685 plate appearances.

==== 2017 ====
On April 2, Longoria hit his fourth career Opening Day home run.

Entering August 1, Longoria was hitting .328 with a .919 OPS after the All Star Break. That night, he would continue his hot streak, becoming just the second Tampa Bay Ray to hit for the cycle, the first having been B. J. Upton in 2009. Longoria homered in the first, tripled in the third, singled in the seventh, and doubled in the ninth. In the ninth, Longoria was originally called out at second before replay overturned the call. Per Elias Sports Bureau, Longoria became the first player to hit for the cycle while having one of his hits reviewed. Offensively, Longoria had a down year, slashing .261/.313/.414 with 20 home runs, however he excelled defensively, and won his third career Gold Glove Award.

=== San Francisco Giants (2018–2022) ===
==== 2018 ====
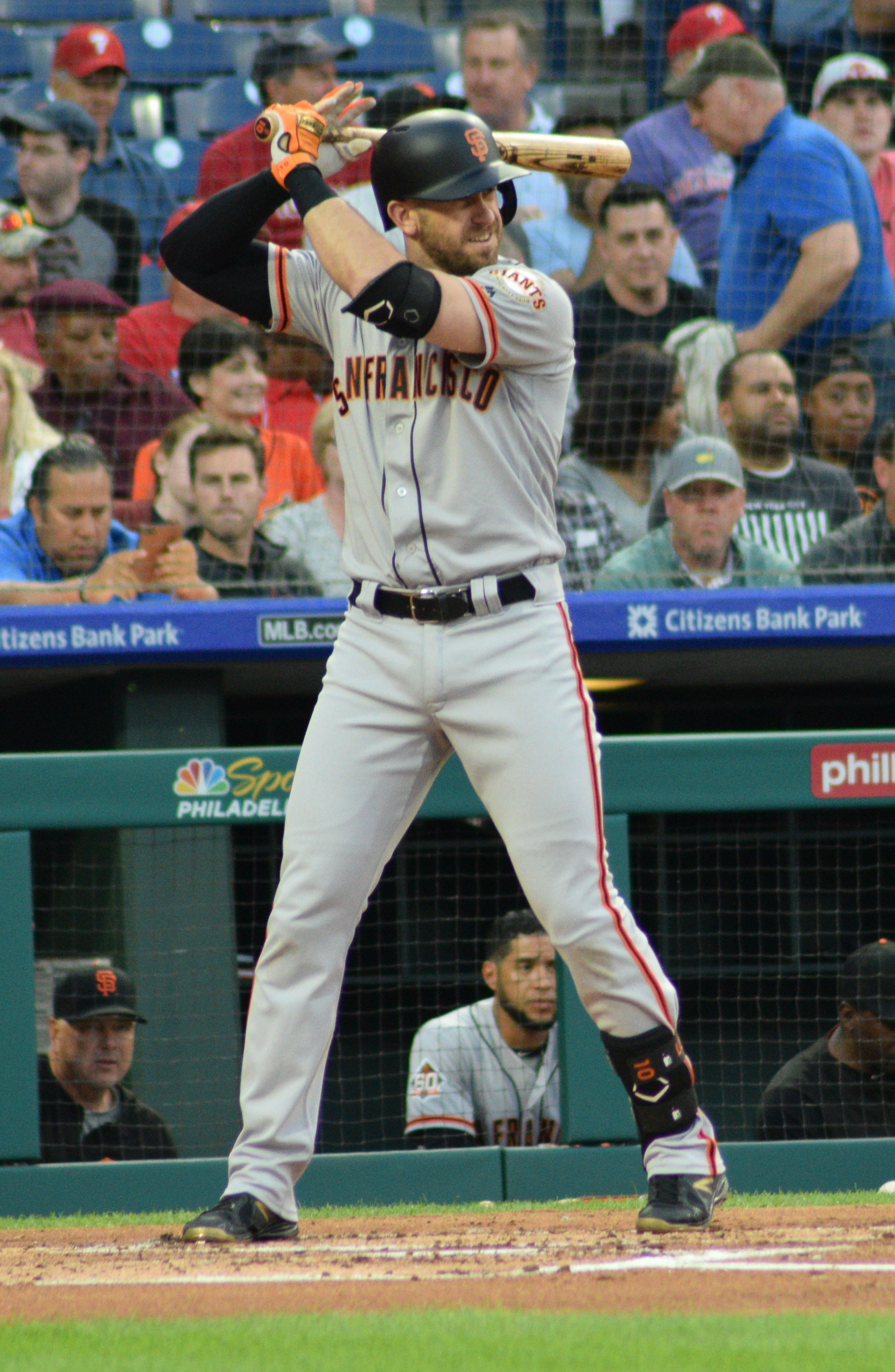
Longoria batting for the Giants in 2018

On December 20, 2017, the Rays traded Longoria and cash considerations to the San Francisco Giants for Christian Arroyo, Denard Span, Matt Krook, and Stephen Woods.

On May 5, 2018, Longoria hit a double to mark his 1,500th career hit in an 11–2 victory over the Atlanta Braves. On June 14, Longoria was hit by a pitch on his left hand and left the game. Soon after, it was revealed that there was a fractured fifth metacarpal in his left hand. Two days into his injury, it was revealed that Longoria was facing surgery, which would likely keep him out for 6–8 weeks. Longoria experienced a disappointing 2018 season with the Giants as he hit a career-low 16 home runs (which led the Giants), had a career low in runs batted in with 54 and tied his career low with a .244 batting average.

==== 2019 ====
In 2019, he batted .254/.325/.437, with 20 home runs and 69 RBIs in 453 at bats.

==== 2020 ====
On August 21, 2020, at Oracle Park, in a 6–2 win over the Arizona Diamondbacks, Longoria hit his 300th career home run off of Robbie Ray with one out in the bottom of the third inning. He became the 150th player in Major League history to reach the milestone. In 2020, he batted .254/.297/.425 with 7 home runs and 28 RBIs in 193 at bats. He was 2nd among NL third basemen with a .984 fielding percentage.

==== 2021 ====
On July 16, 2021, Longoria was placed on the 60-day injured list with a left shoulder sprain, and he missed half of the season. In the 2021 regular season, he batted .261/.351/.482 with 13 home runs and 46 RBIs in 253 at bats.

==== 2022 ====
On March 30, 2022, it was announced that Longoria would miss Opening Day and be out six weeks following surgery to repair a torn ligament in his finger.

In 2022, in addition to a 24-at-bat stretch with AAA Sacramento in which he batted .333, with the Giants he batted .244/.315/.451 in 266 at bats with 14 home runs and 42 RBIs. He played 68 games at third base with the Giants, and 17 at DH.

On November 10, 2022, the Giants declined their $13 million contract option on Longoria, making him a free agent for the first time in his career.

=== Arizona Diamondbacks (2023) ===
On January 5, 2023, Longoria signed a one-year, $4 million contract with the Arizona Diamondbacks. On June 27, Longoria homered off of Taj Bradley of the Tampa Bay Rays, giving him the distinction of having hit home runs against all 30 MLB teams. Longoria batted .223 in 74 games. The Diamondbacks made it into the playoffs with 84 wins, with Longoria making an appearance in each game of their run to the National League pennant, where he collected three RBIs combined, which included one in Game 6 of the NLCS that made it 3–0 in an 5–1 victory where Arizona was facing elimination. The 15 years between his first and second World Series appearance is the longest for a position player. He started four games in the 2023 World Series, batting 3-for-11 (.273), with an RBI, two runs and four strikeouts, as the Diamondbacks lost to the Texas Rangers in five games. He became a free agent following the season.

=== Retirement ===
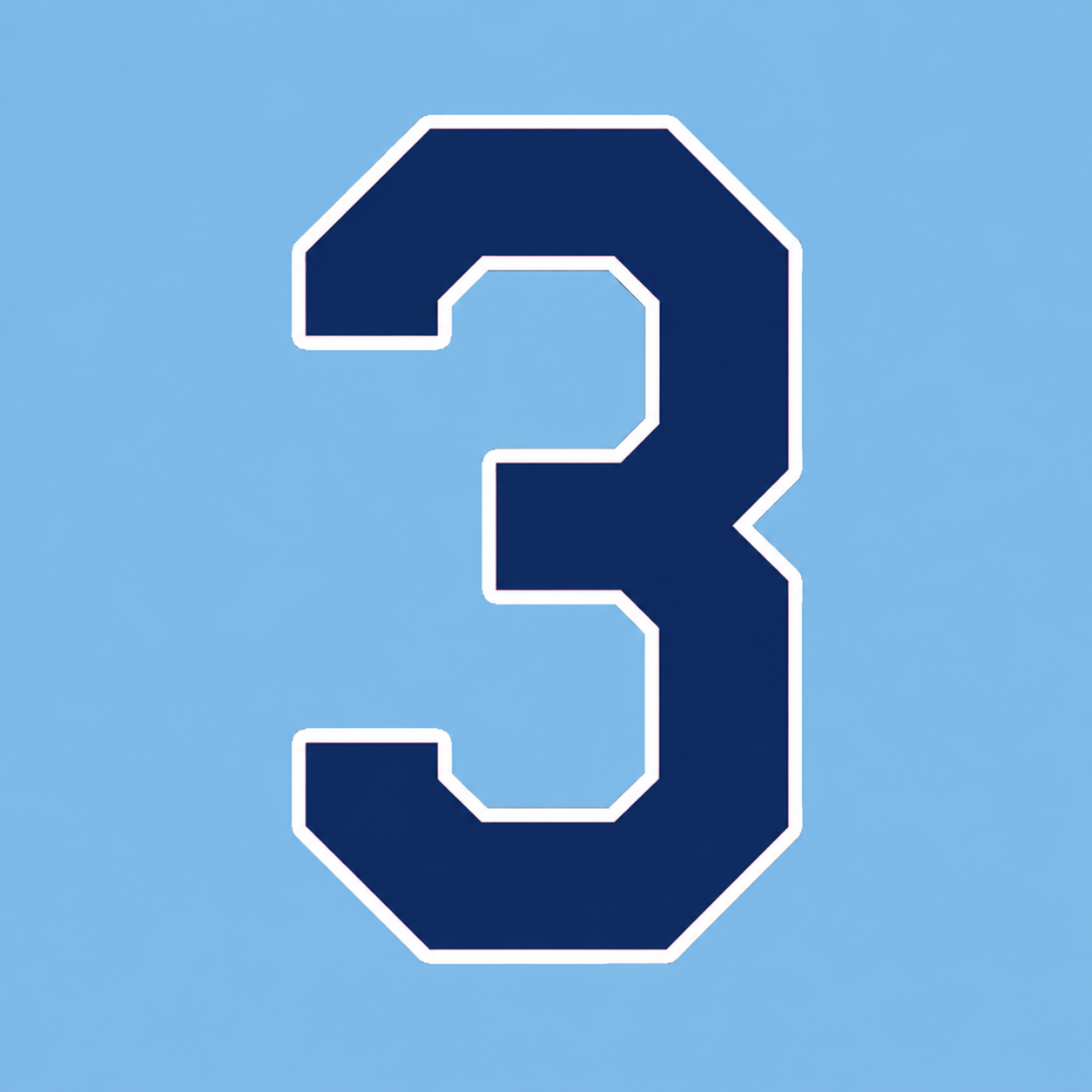
Evan Longoria's number 3 was retired by the Tampa Bay Rays in 2026.

On June 7, 2025, Longoria signed a one-day contract with the Rays to officially retire as a member of the team. Longoria was elected to the Rays Hall of Fame on July 11, 2026, and his number was retired by the franchise on the following day.

== International career ==
Longoria was selected for the United States national baseball team at the 2007 Baseball World Cup and 2009 World Baseball Classic. He was called upon on March 19, 2009, to replace Chipper Jones in the World Baseball Classic.

He was also selected to be one of the MLB All-Stars in the 2014 MLB Japan All-Star Series.

== Personal life ==
The similarity of his name with actress Eva Longoria's has brought about playful comparisons between the two. Although both are Americans of Mexican descent, they are not related. When asked as a college baseball player in 2005 about the name similarity, he admitted that he got "ragged on it a lot, but I don't mind. My friends and I think she's hot." However, when asked about it again in 2008, Evan said that he was "done talking about that. I did it all through the minor leagues. That's all I had to hear was her name associated with mine. I think we're kind of past that. That's all." After he was named to the 2008 Major League Baseball All-Star Game, Eva sent Evan a bottle of champagne and a note thanking him for "doing the Longoria name proud". In return, Evan sent Eva three signed jerseys. The name similarity between Evan and Eva has led to some heckling by opposing fans against him.

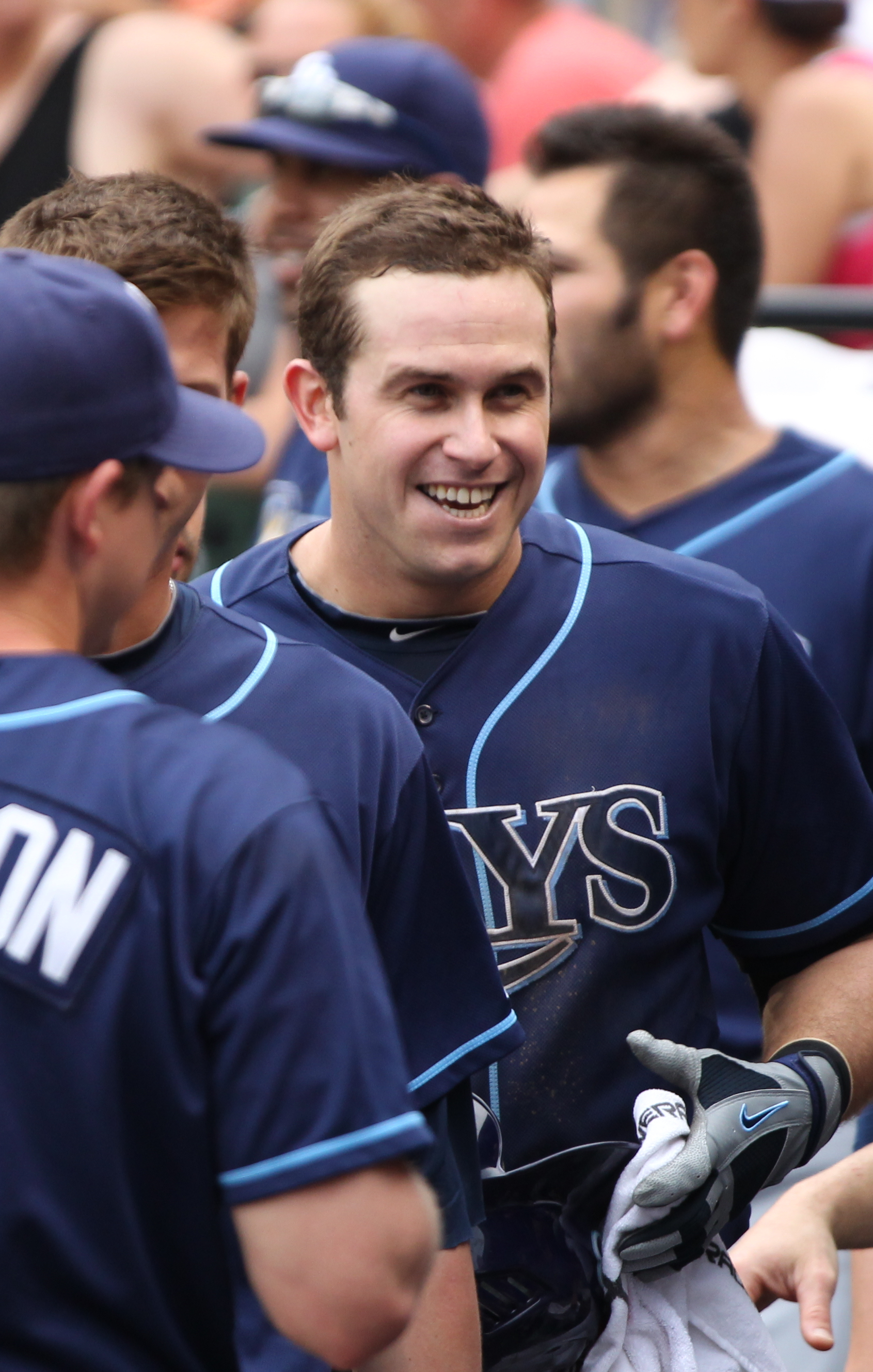
Longoria with his teammates

Longoria was named the cover athlete for Major League Baseball 2K10, succeeding Tim Lincecum. Longoria also appears in a commercial for the game that advertises the $1 million prize given to the first person to pitch a perfect game in MLB 2K10. In the commercial, Longoria breaks up a perfect game with a home run. On August 8, 2010, Longoria broke up a no-hitter in the ninth inning with two outs. Longoria spoiled Brandon Morrow's attempt with a putt-shot to the Blue Jays' second baseman, who was unable to make a play on it. Brandon Morrow was left with a 17-strikeout one-hitter (which would have tied Nolan Ryan for most strikeouts in a no-hitter).

He was featured in a TV commercial for Gillette. Longoria has also appeared in a commercial for New Era hats that was aired during the 2010 season.

On March 8, 2011, his classic 1967 black and white Camaro RS, valued at $75,000, and a Buick GSX, valued at $125,000, were reported stolen from an Arizona lot. Longoria lives in California, but was having work done on the cars in Arizona.

On March 28, 2011, Longoria, David Price and Reid Brignac's rental property in Port Charlotte, Florida, was broken into, while they were away at the nearby Charlotte Sports Park stadium for a game. According to the St. Petersburg Times, police estimated $56,000 in lost property from the burglary. Among the loot was Longoria's AK-47 rifle.

Longoria is an avid self-taught drummer and had a drum kit in Tropicana Field. He owns a drumhead signed by members of the Canadian rock band Rush.

In February 2012, Longoria confirmed he was dating January 2010 Playmate of the Month Jaime Edmondson, who was also a contestant on the 14th season and the 18th season of The Amazing Race. Longoria and Edmondson married on December 31, 2015. They have three children.

Longoria owns a restaurant in South Tampa called "Ducky's" which opened in December 2013.

== Viral video ==
A video showing Longoria being interviewed during batting practice when a foul ball flies in the direction of the reporter and is intercepted bare handed by him was published on YouTube on May 6, 2011. The video had 10-million views as of November 2021, and achieved 22-million views by February 2025.

After the video was released, Longoria told the Tampa Tribune the video was real. Ten years later, however, Longoria acknowledged in an interview that the catch was staged. After release, many sources suspected that the video is probably fake. Mashable said the video is probably an ad for Gillette, because the logo of the company is shown clearly in the background of the video, and Longoria had done ads for the company before. CBS cites as evidence of the video being fake the fact that the reporter is not given a name, that there is no television channel logo anywhere in the video, and that no channels claim being the owners of the video, despite its popularity. Fact-checking website Snopes concluded the video was a fake, citing the absence of safety equipment, and the proximity of the reporter to the field. In addition to the ball, the Gillette logos in the background were also generated by computers. To date, Gillette has never publicly acknowledged if the video was an advertisement.

== See also ==
- List of Major League Baseball players to hit for the cycle
- List of Major League Baseball career home run leaders

Awards and achievements
Preceded by Dustin Pedroia	Sporting News AL Rookie of the Year; 2008	Succeeded by Gordon Beckham
Preceded by Dustin Pedroia	Players Choice AL Most Outstanding Rookie; 2008	Succeeded by Gordon Beckham
Preceded by Ryan Braun	Topps Rookie All-Star Third Baseman; 2008	Succeeded by Gordon Beckham
Preceded by Hank Blalock; Ben Zobrist	AL Player of the Week; April 5–12, 2009	Succeeded by Ian Kinsler; Zack Greinke
Preceded by Shin-Soo Choo	American League Player of the Month; April 2009	Succeeded by Joe Mauer
Preceded by Cody Bellinger	Hitting for the cycle August 1, 2017	Succeeded by José Abreu
