= Denard Span =

American baseball player (born 1984)

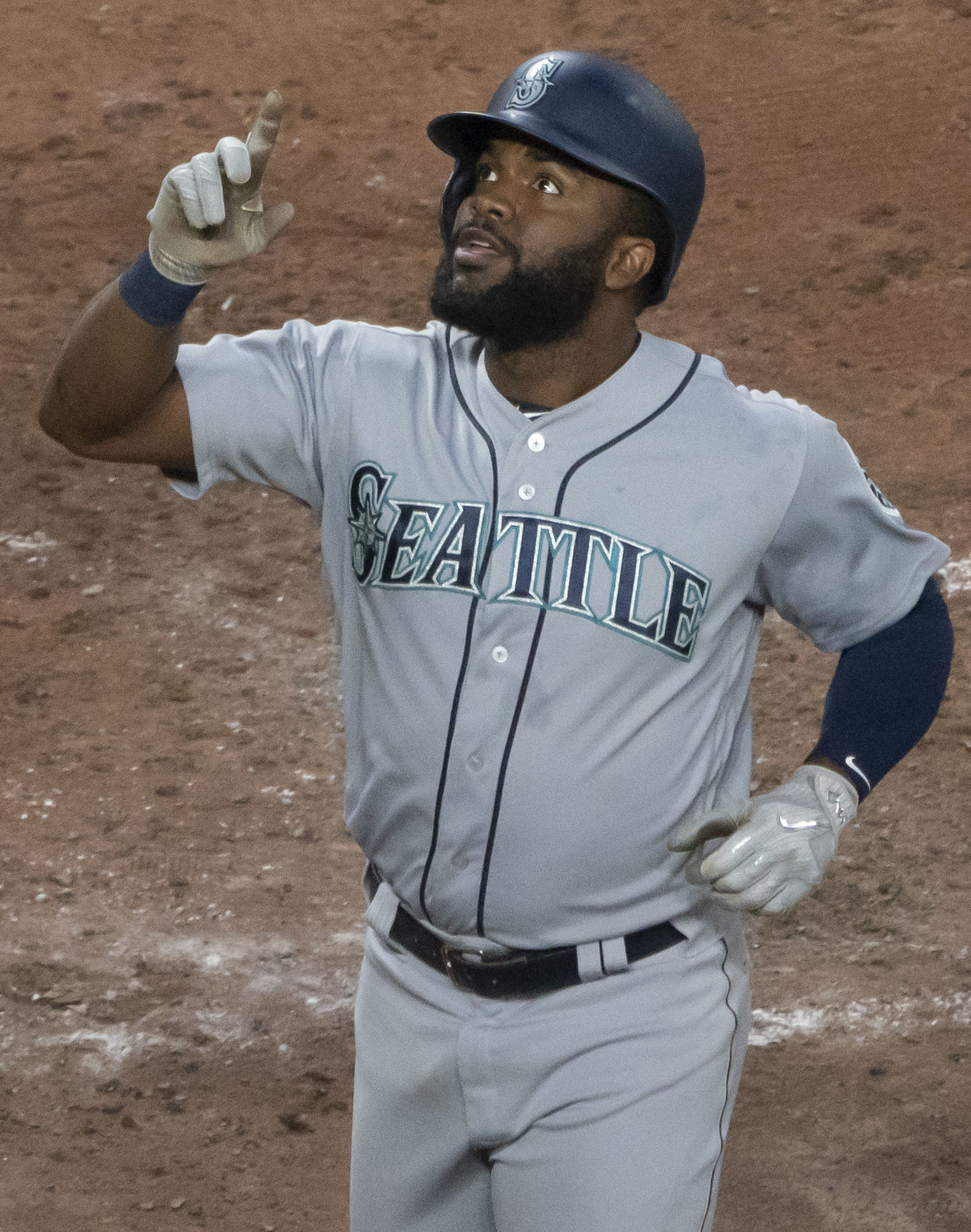
- Span with the Seattle Mariners in 2018
- Center fielder
- Born: February 27, 1984 (age 42); Washington, D.C., U.S.
- Batted: Left Threw: Left

MLB debut
- April 6, 2008, for the Minnesota Twins

Last MLB appearance
- September 30, 2018, for the Seattle Mariners

MLB statistics
- Batting average: .281
- Home runs: 71
- Runs batted in: 490
- Stats at Baseball Reference

Teams
- Minnesota Twins (2008–2012); Washington Nationals (2013–2015); San Francisco Giants (2016–2017); Tampa Bay Rays (2018); Seattle Mariners (2018)

Keiunta Denard Span (born February 27, 1984) is an American former professional baseball center fielder. He played in Major League Baseball (MLB) for the Minnesota Twins, Washington Nationals, San Francisco Giants, Tampa Bay Rays and Seattle Mariners.

Span batted and threw left-handed. At the height of his playing career was known as one of the premier leadoff hitters in baseball due to his exceptional on-base percentage.

== Early life ==
Span was raised by his single mother, Wanda Wilson, in Tampa. Wilson, a Federal City College graduate, supported Span and his brother, Ray, by working variously as a claims adjuster and day care operator. Their father had very little presence in their lives.

As a teenager, he attended Tampa Bay Devil Rays games at Tropicana Field. He attended Tampa Catholic High School where he played football and baseball. Span won a state baseball championship with Tampa Catholic as a junior in 2001. As a senior, he hit .490 with 17 doubles, three triples, 20 RBI, 24 stolen bases and 33 runs scored in 28 games. He committed to play college baseball at Florida. According to Baseball America, he could have played college football as a wide receiver if he had not focused on baseball.

== Professional career ==
Span was selected by the Minnesota Twins in the first round (20th overall) of the 2002 Major League Baseball draft from Tampa Catholic. Span turned down just over $2 million from the Colorado Rockies in a predraft deal (who instead drafted Jeff Francis with the eighth pick) and his fall to the 20th pick cost him around $800,000. Following his selection, Span signed with the Twins on August 15, 2002, receiving a $1.7 million signing bonus.

Span started his minor league career in 2003 with the Elizabethton Twins, the Twins' rookie-league affiliate. In 50 games, he batted .271 with a home run, 18 RBI and 14 stolen bases. In 2004, Span was promoted first to the Gulf Coast League Twins in Fort Myers, Florida and, after only appearing in five games, for the Quad Cities River Bandits of the Low-A Midwest League. Overall, in 2004, he hit a combined .273 with 15 RBI and 15 stolen bases in 69 games. In 2005, he was promoted to the Fort Myers Miracle, the Twins Advanced-A affiliate, and then to the New Britain Rock Cats, the Twins Double-A affiliate. Span batted .307 with a home run, 45 RBI and 23 stolen bases in 117 combined games in 2005. In 2006, Span returned to the Rock Cats and spent the entire season with the team, batting .285 with two home runs and 45 RBI in 134 games. He was later promoted to the Triple-A Rochester Red Wings for the 2007 season, and hit .267 with three home runs, 55 RBI and 25 stolen bases in 139 games.

=== Minnesota Twins ===
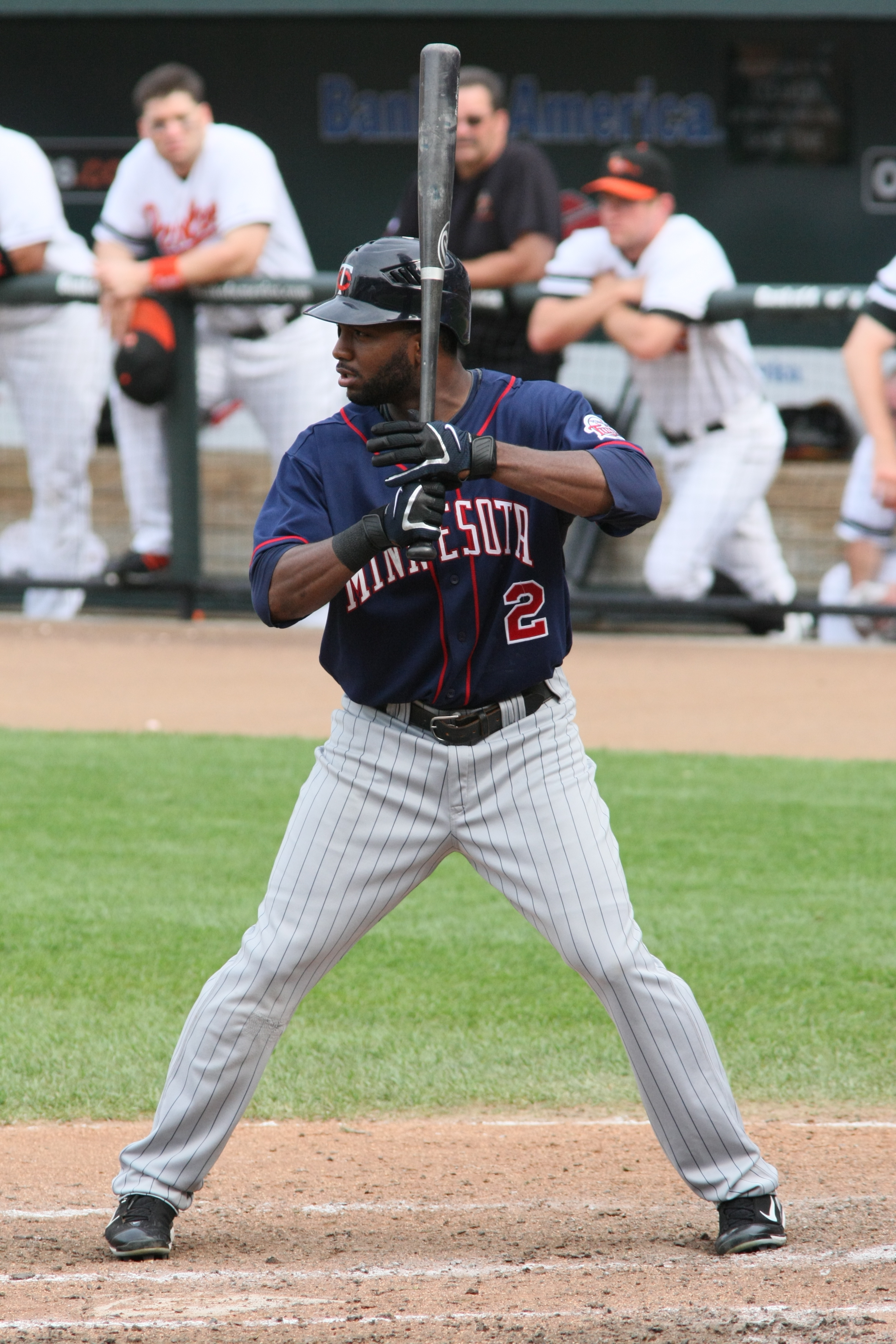
Span batting for the Minnesota Twins in 2008

Throughout the 2008 spring training, Span was competing with Carlos Gómez to be the Twins' starting center fielder, but ultimately lost out to Gómez and was outrighted to Triple-A Rochester. However, on April 5, Michael Cuddyer was placed on the 15-day disabled list and Span was called up to make his Major League debut against the Kansas City Royals the next day. Span failed to impress the Twins (hitting .258/.324/.258) and was sent back down to Rochester. However, he got hot over the next 40 games in AAA (.340/.434/.481) and was recalled to the Twins, where he spent the rest of 2008 season. Span's 2008 season totals were .294/.387/.432 with six home runs, 47 RBI, and seven triples in 93 games. Span was chosen to play in the 2008 Beijing Olympics, but because he had been promoted his schedule didn't allow him to participate.

In 2009, Span got the nod to start as a left fielder. He also played center field and right field throughout the season. His 2009 stats showed some improvement from 2008, hitting .311/.392/.415 with eight home runs, 68 RBI, and 10 triples in 145 games. He also stole bases 23 times while getting caught 10 times. Span earned the odd distinction of becoming the player to hit both the first regular and post season hits at the new Yankee Stadium in 2009.

On March 13, 2010, Span signed a five-year, $16.5 million contract extension with the Twins that included an option for the 2015 season worth $9 million with a $500,000 buyout. This contract effectively bought out all of Span's arbitration years but did not go beyond his available free agency. On March 31, he unintentionally hit his mother, who was sitting in the stands, with a foul ball. On April 2, Span collected the first hit (a triple) and the first home run in the Twins' new ballpark Target Field in an exhibition game against the St. Louis Cardinals.

On June 29, Span tied the modern-day Major League Baseball record by hitting three triples in one game against the Detroit Tigers in an 11–4 victory. He became the 29th player since 1900 to accomplish this feat, the second Minnesota Twin (after Ken Landreaux in 1980), and the first player since Rafael Furcal performed the feat on April 21, 2002. His night also included a single and five runs batted in.

Overall, Span hit .284/.357/.389 in his Minnesota career, with 254 walks and 321 strikeouts in 2,354 at-bats and stole 90 bases in 118 attempts. Adding his strong defense gives him an overall wins above replacement of 15.9. He also became the first ever player on the 7-day disabled list in 2012.

=== Washington Nationals ===
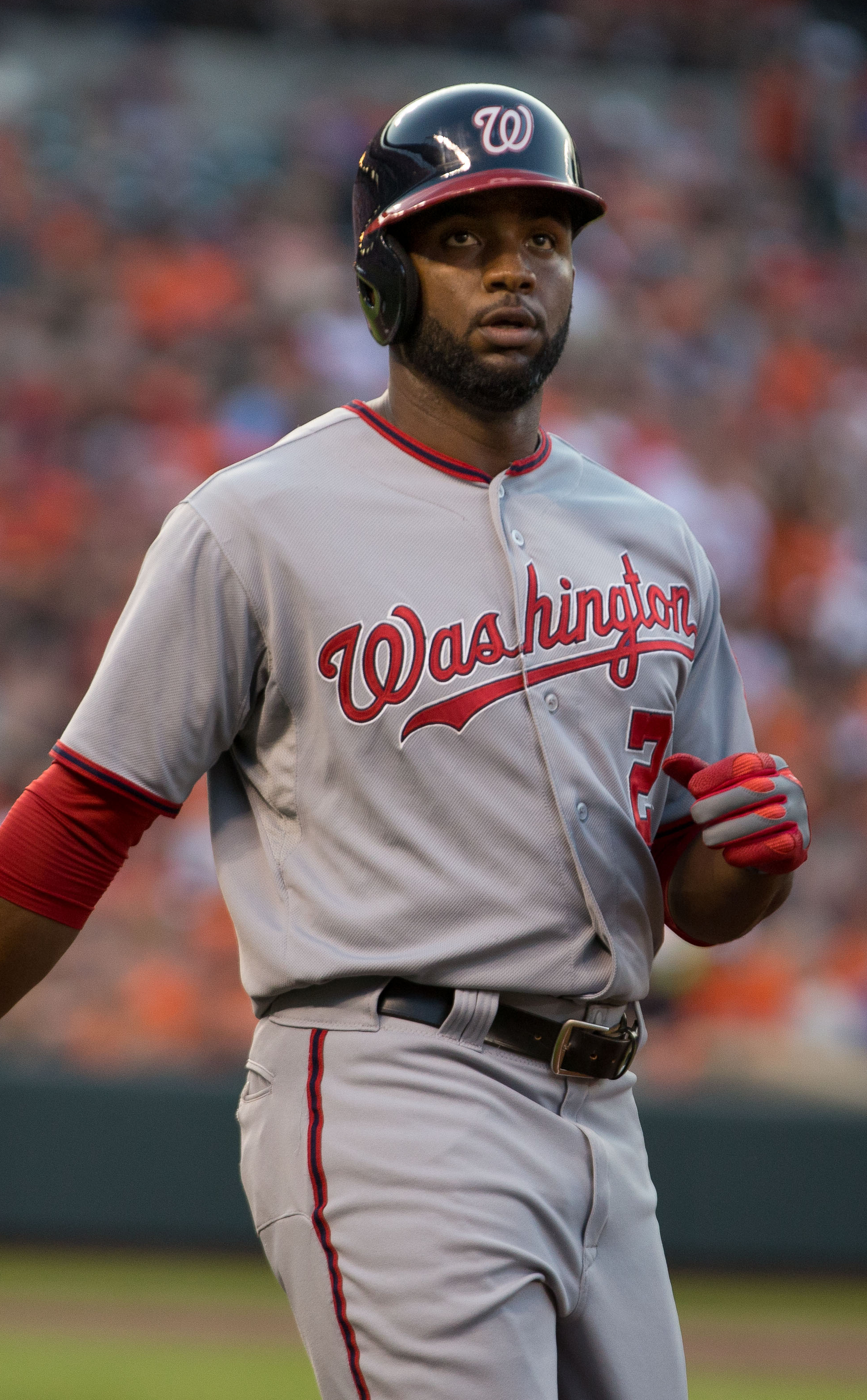
Span during his tenure with the Washington Nationals in 2013

After being tied with the Nationals in trade rumors as far back as 2011, the Twins finally traded Span to the team on November 29, 2012 for Washington's 2011 first round pick (23rd overall), starting pitcher Alex Meyer. After the trade, Span became the team's starting center fielder, moving 2012 NL Rookie of the Year Bryce Harper to left field. During the 2013 season, Span set a personal and league high with a 29-game hit streak (besting the previous 2013 season high of 27 games set by former Twins teammate Michael Cuddyer). The streak ended on September 19 following an 0-for-4 performance against the Miami Marlins. During the streak, Span raised his season average from .258 to .281 (46-for-128) while hitting two home runs, recording 9 RBI, and scoring 21 runs. For the season, he batted .279/.327/.380 with four home runs and 47 RBI in 153 games, and he led the majors with 11 triples. The 11 triples set a Nationals record for most in a season, a record as of 2025 shared by Daylen Lile.

On September 5, 2014, he earned his 1,000th career hit against the Philadelphia Phillies at Nationals Park. Span finished the 2014 season hitting .302/.355/.416 with five home runs, 37 RBI and a career-high 31 stolen bases in 147 games. He also led the National League with 184 hits, which also set the Nationals club record for hits in a single season.

On December 3, 2014, Span underwent a sports hernia surgery. He claimed that he suffered this injury toward the end of the 2014 season but didn't miss any games. Recovery time required six weeks, giving him enough time to be ready for 2015 spring training. During March 2015, Span underwent core muscle surgery. He began the 2015 season on the 15-day disabled list and made his season debut on April 19, 2015. Span was limited to just 61 games in 2015, posting a slash line of .301/.365/.431 with five home runs and 22 RBI.

=== San Francisco Giants ===
On January 7, 2016, Span signed a three-year, $31 million contract with the San Francisco Giants that included a mutual option for 2019 and $5 million in performance bonuses. On June 13 at AT&T Park, Span became the first Giant to hit a leadoff splash hit home run in the first inning into McCovey Cove and joined the San Diego Padres' Brian Giles (2008) as the only two players in the history of the ballpark to accomplish the feat. He batted .268/.330/.402 in his two seasons for San Francisco.

=== Tampa Bay Rays ===
On December 20, 2017, the Giants traded Span, Christian Arroyo, Matt Krook, and Stephen Woods to the Tampa Bay Rays for Evan Longoria and cash considerations. On March 29, 2018, Span hit a three-run triple on Opening Day 2018 against Carson Smith of the Boston Red Sox to give the Rays a 5–4 lead. He became the third player to triple in his Rays debut. He batted .238/.364/.385 with four home runs and 28 RBI in 43 games with Tampa Bay.

=== Seattle Mariners ===
On May 25, 2018, the Rays traded Span and reliever Álex Colomé to the Seattle Mariners in exchange for minor leaguers Andrew Moore and Tommy Romero. He hit .272/.329/.435 with seven home runs and 30 RBI in 94 games for Seattle. The Mariners declined the 2019 option on his contract, making him a free agent, on October 30, 2018.

On June 8, 2020, Span confirmed that he had played his final game in the major leagues.

=== Career statistics ===
In 1,359 games over 11 seasons, Span posted a .281 batting average (1,498-for-5,326) with 773 runs, 265 doubles, 72 triples, 71 home runs, 490 RBIs, 185 stolen bases, 515 bases on balls, .347 on-base percentage and .398 slugging percentage. He finished his career with a .991 fielding percentage playing at all three outfield positions. In 14 postseason games, he hit .258 (17-for-66) with four runs, three doubles, one triple, two RBI, two stolen bases and two walks.

== Career after baseball ==
On January 24, 2021, it was announced that Span was hired by the Tampa Bay Rays as a special assistant in baseball operations. Span joined Bally Sports Sun as an analyst for the Rays in February 2023.

On January 16, 2025, it was announced that Span joined the Minnesota Twins as an analyst.

== Personal life ==
Span is a Christian. Span proposed to Anne Schleper, who won a silver medal for ice hockey with the United States in the 2014 Winter Olympics, on December 31, 2016. They married in January 2017 in Naples, Florida. The couple had their first child, a son, in October 2017.

Span founded a non-profit, The Denard Span Foundation, to aid single parent families.

== See also ==
- List of Major League Baseball annual triples leaders
