= Hamptons Collegiate Baseball League =

US summer baseball organization

- Sport: Baseball
- Founded: 2007
- No. of teams: 6
- Country: United States
- Website: hamptonsbaseball.org

The Hamptons Collegiate Baseball League (HCBL) is a summer baseball organization located in The Hamptons in the U.S. state of New York. It is a seven-team league consisting of the Sag Harbor Whalers, Southampton Breakers, Westhampton Aviators, North Fork Ospreys, Shelter Island Bucks and the Riverhead Tomcats. The HCBL is a member of the National Alliance of College Summer Baseball and is sanctioned by Major League Baseball.

== Teams ==
Hamptons Collegiate Baseball's regular season begins in early June and concludes with the HCBL playoffs in early August. For the playoffs between 2008 and 2012 during the HCBL's affiliation with the Atlantic Collegiate Baseball League, the winner of the HCBL played the Kaiser and/or Wolff Division winner for the ACBL championship.

League	Team	Town	Home Field
HCBL	North Fork Ospreys	Southold	Cochran Park, Peconic
HCBL	Riverhead Tomcats	Riverhead	Sgt. Jonathan Keller Field, Veterans Memorial Park, Calverton
HCBL	Sag Harbor Whalers	Sag Harbor	Mashashimuet Park, Sag Harbor
HCBL	Shelter Island Bucks	Shelter Island	Fiske Field, Shelter Island
HCBL	Southampton Breakers	Southampton	Southampton High School
HCBL	Westhampton Aviators	Westhampton Beach	Hite Field, Westhampton Beach

Former Teams

- Center Moriches Battlecats: 2012-2013
- Montauk Mustangs: 2014-2016
- South Shore Clippers/Long Island Road Warriors: 2017-2025

== HCBL Champions ==
2008 – Sag Harbor Whalers|Hampton Whalers
2009 – Westhampton Aviators
2010 – North Fork Ospreys
2011 – Westhampton Aviators
2012 – Southampton Breakers
2013 – North Fork Ospreys
2014 – Southampton Breakers
2015 – Shelter Island Bucks
2016 – Westhampton Aviators
2017 – Long Island Road Warriors
2018 – Riverhead Tomcats
2019 – Westhampton Aviators
2020 – No season (COVID-19)
2021 – Southampton Breakers
2022 – Sag Harbor Whalers
2023 – South Shore Clippers
2024 – Southampton Breakers
2025 - South Shore Clippers

== Atlantic Collegiate Baseball League Champions (2008-2012) ==
2009 – Westhampton Aviators
2010 – North Fork Ospreys

== MLB Draft History ==
Draft year	Player	Summer Team	College	MLB team	Draft Round
2009	Barry Butera	Sag Harbor '08	Boston College	Houston Astros	21st
2010	Steve McQuail	Sag Harbor '08	Canisius	Toronto Blue Jays	30th
2010	Justin Echevarria	Riverhead '09	Stony Brook	San Diego Padres	40th
2011	**Nick Ahmed**	Westhampton '09	UConn	Atlanta Braves	2nd
2011	**Kyle Kubitza**	Southampton '09	Texas State	Atlanta Braves	3rd
2011	**Nick Tropeano**	Riverhead '09	Stony Brook	Houston Astros	5th
2011	Andrew Cain	North Fork '09	UNC-Wilmington	Milwaukee Brewers	12th
2011	**Phil Klein**	Sag Harbor '08	Youngstown State	Texas Rangers	30th
2011	Joel Thys	Sag Harbor '10	Ohlone	Florida Marlins	47th
2012	Paul Paez	Southampton '12	Rio Hondo	New York Mets	18th
2012	Alex Williams	Westhampton '10	Louisiana Tech	Chicago White Sox	19th
2012	Andrew Cain	North Fork '09	UNC Wilmington	San Francisco Giants	24th
2012	Brandon Kuter	Westhampton '10, '11	George Mason	Texas Rangers	29th
2012	Andrew Ferreira	Southampton '10	Harvard	Minnesota Twins	32nd
2012	**Justin Topa**	Southampton '10	Long Island	Cincinnati Reds	33rd
2012	Blake Amaral	Southampton '10	Hawaii Pacific	Los Angeles Angels of Anaheim	40th
2012	Kevin Heller	Westhampton '10, '11	Amherst	Boston Red Sox	40th
2013	**Stuart Turner**	Southampton '11	Ole Miss	Minnesota Twins	3rd
2013	**Jordan Patterson**	Westhampton '11	South Alabama	Colorado Rockies	4th
2013	**Aaron Slegers**	Riverhead '11	Indiana	Minnesota Twins	5th
2013	**Kyle McGowin**	Sag Harbor '11, '12	Savannah State	Los Angeles Angels of Anaheim	5th
2013	**Zack Godley**	Southampton '10	Tennessee	Chicago Cubs	10th
2013	James Lomangino	Westhampton '10	St. John's	Oakland Athletics	14th
2013	**Kevin McCarthy**	Sag Harbor '11	Marist	Kansas City Royals	16th
2013	Zach Mathieu	Riverhead '11	Franklin Pierce	New York Mets	16th
2013	**Justin Topa**	Southampton '10	Long Island	Pittsburgh Pirates	17th
2013	**Frank Schwindel**	Riverhead '11	St. John's	Kansas City Royals	18th
2013	Garrett Hughes	Southampton '10	Stanford	San Francisco Giants	19th
2013	Mike Ahmed	Westhampton '11	Holy Cross	Los Angeles Dodgers	20th
2013	Brenton Allen	Southampton '12	UCLA	Washington Nationals	20th
2013	Antonio Alvarez	Southampton '11	Elon	Arizona Diamondbacks	22nd
2013	**Donnie Hart**	Westhampton '10	Texas State	Baltimore Orioles	27th
2013	**Kyle Lloyd**	Westhampton '10	Evansville	San Diego Padres	29th
2013	Joel Thys	Sag Harbor '11	Arizona Christian	Arizona Diamondbacks	31st
2013	Max Watt	Center Moriches '13	Hillsborough CC	Boston Red Sox	37th
2013	Paul Paez	Southampton '12	Rio Hondo	New York Mets	38th
2013	Jack Cleary	Southampton '10	Maryland	Milwaukee Brewers	39th
2014	Mac James	Shelter Island '13	Oklahoma	Tampa Bay Rays	6th
2014	Kody Kerski	North Fork '11	Sacred Heart	Seattle Mariners	8th
2014	JB Kole	Southampton '12	Villanova	Milwaukee Brewers	8th
2014	Chris Pike	Southampton '11	Oklahoma City	Tampa Bay Rays	9th
2014	Ben Brewster	Sag Harbor '11	Maryland	Chicago White Sox	17th
2014	Steve Ascher	North Fork '12	SUNY Oneonta	Tampa Bay Rays	17th
2014	James Lomangino	Westhampton '10	St. John's	Colorado Rockies	18th
2014	Alec Sole	Riverhead '12	Saint Louis	Tampa Bay Rays	18th
2014	Jordan Parris	Riverhead '12	Tennessee Tech	Colorado Rockies	20th
2014	Jim Duff	Sag Harbor '12	Stonehill	New York Mets	20th
2014	Patrick Peterson	Southampton '12	NC State	Seattle Mariners	23rd
2014	Tyler Badamo	Center Moriches '12	Dowling	New York Mets	24th
2014	Brandon Thomas	Center Moriches '13	San Diego State	Kansas City Royals	24th
2014	Taylor Black	Westhampton '11	Texas State	Colorado Rockies	26th
2014	David Speer	Southampton '11	Columbia	Cleveland Indians	27th
2014	Brant Whiting	Southampton '11, '12	Stanford	Los Angeles Dodgers	30th
2014	Justin Hepner	North Fork '12	San Diego State	Miami Marlins	36th
2014	Eric Peterson	Southampton '12	NC State	Houston Astros	37th
2014	JJ Franco	Sag Harbor '11, '12, '13	Brown	Atlanta Braves	38th
2015	**Seby Zavala**	Riverhead '12	San Diego State	Chicago White Sox	12th
2015	**Cody Stashak**	Westhampton '14	St. John's	Minnesota Twins	13th
2015	**Nick Dini**	Center Moriches '12	Wagner	Kansas City Royals	14th
2015	Jerry Downs	Riverhead '13	St. Thomas	Boston Red Sox	15th
2015	Thomas Hackimer	North Fork '13	St. John's	New York Mets	15th
2015	Ryan McCormick	Southampton '13	St. John's	Colorado Rockies	16th
2015	Max Almonte	Southampton '12, '13	Villanova	St. Louis Cardinals	16th
2015	Joey Havrilak	Westhampton '13	Akron	Detroit Tigers	18th
2015	Kyle Miller	Montauk '14	Florida Atlantic	Chicago Cubs	19th
2015	Rob Fonseca	Southampton '12	Northeastern	Seattle Mariners	21st
2015	Max Watt	Center Moriches '13, Shelter Island '14	Lynn	Boston Red Sox	22nd
2015	**Danny Mendick**	Riverhead '14	UMass Lowell	Chicago White Sox	22nd
2015	**Cody Carroll**	Center Moriches '12	Southern Miss	New York Yankees	22nd
2015	Alex Perez	North Fork '12	Virginia Tech	Minnesota Twins	23rd
2015	Jacob Bodner	Sag Harbor '12, '13	Xavier	Kansas City Royals	27th
2015	Stuart Levy	Sag Harbor '12	Arkansas State	Baltimore Orioles	27th
2015	Alex Katz	Shelter Island '13	St. John's	Chicago White Sox	27th
2015	Mike Wallace	Shelter Island '13	Fairfield	Pittsburgh Pirates	30th
2015	Brendan Butler	Center Moriches '13	Dowling	Oakland Athletics	30th
2015	Tim Ingram	Southampton '14	SUNY Old Westbury	Tampa Bay Rays	30th
2015	Dillon Persinger	Riverhead '15	Golden West	Cleveland Indians	31st
2015	Charles Galiano	Center Moriches '13	Fordham	Milwaukee Brewers	40th
2016	**Corbin Burnes**	Riverhead '14	St. Mary's	Milwaukee Brewers	4th
2016	Thomas Hackimer	North Fork '13	St. John's	Minnesota Twins	4th
2016	Stephen Woods	North Fork '14	Albany	San Francisco Giants	8th
2016	**Stephen Ridings**	Shelter Island '15	Haverford	Chicago Cubs	8th
2016	Sam Machonis	Shelter Island '13	Florida Southern	Detroit Tigers	10th
2016	Dan Rizzie	Sag Harbor '13, '14	Xavier	New York Mets	13th
2016	Chris Hall	Sag Harbor '13	Elon	Toronto Blue Jays	14th
2016	Andre Jernigan	Riverhead '13	Xavier	Minnesota Twins	14th
2016	**Nick Heath**	North Fork '13, '15	Northwestern State	Kansas City Royals	16th
2016	Will Savage	Shelter Island '14	Columbia	Detroit Tigers	16th
2016	Dillon Persinger	Riverhead '15	Golden West	Los Angeles Dodgers	17th
2016	**Greg Weissert**	Westhampton '14	Fordham	New York Yankees	18th
2016	Stefan Trosclair	Center Moriches '13	Louisiana Lafayette	St. Louis Cardinals	20th
2016	Brennan Morgan	Westhampton '13	Kennesaw State	Los Angeles Angels of Anaheim	24th
2016	Charley Gould	Riverhead '13	William & Mary	Oakland Athletics	26th
2016	Jack Sundberg	Riverhead '13	Connecticut	Washington Nationals	26th
2016	Mike O'Reilly	Center Moriches '13	Flagler	St. Louis Cardinals	27th
2016	Ben Ruta	Southampton '13	Wagner	New York Yankees	30th
2016	Trevor Simms	Shelter Island '12, '13	Tulane	Arizona Diamondbacks	32nd
2016	Jonathon Mulford	Sag Harbor '13	Adelphi	Milwaukee Brewers	34th
2016	Ty Blankmeyer	Shelter Island '13	St. John's	Cincinnati Reds	36th
2016	Robert Galligan	North Fork '12	Maryland	Arizona Diamondbacks	36th
2016	Welby Malczewski	Westhampton '14	Heartland CC	Arizona Diamondbacks	37th
2016	Colin Brockhouse	Westhampton '15	Ball State	Pittsburgh Pirates	37th
2017	**Collin Snider**	Shelter Island '15	Vanderbilt	Kansas City Royals	12th
2017	Ricky Surum	Southampton '14	Mount Olive	New York Yankees	16th
2017	Chris Hess	Shelter Island '15	Rhode Island	New York Yankees	17th
2017	Dillon Persinger	Riverhead '15	Cal State Fullerton	Cleveland Indians	18th
2017	Joey Bartosic	Montauk '14	George Washington	Colorado Rockies	19th
2017	**Jake Cousins**	North Fork '14	Penn	Washington Nationals	20th
2017	Jared Finkel	Southampton '16	Iona	Minnesota Twins	23rd
2017	**Matt Peacock**	North Fork '13	South Alabama	Arizona Diamondbacks	23rd
2017	Colin Brockhouse	Westhampton '15	Ball State	Toronto Blue Jays	24th
2017	Matt McCann	Sag Harbor '15	Fairleigh Dickinson	Los Angeles Angels of Anaheim	25th
2017	Dylan Stock	Sag Harbor '15	Binghamton	Detroit Tigers	25th
2017	Gavin Garay	Riverhead '16	St. Petersburg	New York Mets	26th
2017	**Matt Seelinger**	Montauk '16	Farmingdale State	Pittsburgh Pirates	28th
2017	Matt Hammonds	Southampton '14	Sonoma State	Baltimore Orioles	29th
2017	Mike Donadio	Riverhead '14	St. John's	Miami Marlins	30th
2017	Justin Jones	Shelter Island '14	UNLV	Oakland Athletics	34th
2017	Dan Jagiello	Riverhead '15	LIU Post	Los Angeles Dodgers	34th
2017	**Josh Walker**	Montauk '15	New Haven	New York Mets	37th
2018	**Josiah Gray**	Southampton '16	Le Moyne	Cincinnati Reds	2nd CBB
2018	**Richie Palacios**	North Fork '16	Towson	Cleveland Indians	3rd
2018	John Rooney	Southampton '16	Hofstra	Los Angeles Dodgers	3rd
2018	George Bell	Riverhead '17	Connors State	San Francisco Giants	13th
2018	Phil Capra	Montauk '16	Wagner	New York Mets	15th
2018	Brad Case	Montauk '16	Rollins	Pittsburgh Pirates	17th
2018	Evan Marquardt	Westhampton '15	Ball State	Cincinnati Reds	20th
2018	**Reiss Knehr**	Westhampton '16	Fordham	San Diego Padres	20th
2018	Erin Baldwin	Riverhead '15	Samford	Arizona Diamondbacks	20th
2018	John Valente	Montauk '15	St. John's	Detroit Tigers	21st
2018	Jamie Galazin	Montauk '15, Westhampton '16	St. John's	Chicago Cubs	22nd
2018	Ryan Ramiz	Southampton '15	Seton Hall	Seattle Mariners	23rd
2018	Bobby Honeyman	North Fork '15	Stony Brook	Seattle Mariners	29th
2018	**Penn Murfee**	North Fork '14	Santa Clara	Seattle Mariners	33rd
2018	Nick Matera	Sag Harbor '16	Rutgers	Philadelphia Phillies	34th
2019	Connor Lehmann	Southampton '17	Saint Louis	San Diego Padres	7th
2019	Luis Guerrero	Sag Harbor '18	Miami Dade	Houston Astros	8th
2019	Simon Whiteman	Southampton '17	Yale	San Francisco Giants	9th
2019	Sam Ryan	Sag Harbor '17	Virginia Commonwealth	Toronto Blue Jays	12th
2019	**Nick Sogard**	Shelter Island '17	Loyola Marymount	Tampa Bay Rays	12th
2019	Nick Morreale	Sag Harbor '17	Georgetown	San Francisco Giants	14th
2019	Kyle Martin	Riverhead '17	Fordham	Baltimore Orioles	15th
2019	Nick Grande	Long Island '17	Stony Brook	Arizona Diamondbacks	17th
2019	Ryan Smith	Montauk '16	Princeton	Los Angeles Angels of Anaheim	18th
2019	Griffin Dey	Sag Harbor '16	Yale	Detroit Tigers	23rd
2019	Tyler Osik	Riverhead '15, Westhampton '17	Central Florida	Chicago White Sox	27th
2019	Mitch Calandra	Southampton '17	Eckerd	Atlanta Braves	30th
2019	Ed Baram	Southampton '16	Adelphi	Oakland Athletics	30th
2019	Max Smith	North Fork '16	UNLV	Minnesota Twins	31st
2019	Kumar Nambiar	North Fork '16	Yale	Oakland Athletics	34th
2019	Justin Washington	Sag Harbor '16	Savannah State	Minnesota Twins	35th
2019	Tom Archer	North Fork '16, '17	Lynn	Chicago White Sox	39th
2019	Logan Steenstra	Shelter Island '19	Cowley College	Minnesota Twins	40th
2020	Ryan Murphy	Sag Harbor '18	Le Moyne	San Francisco Giants	5th
2021	**Carson Seymour**	Southampton '18	Kansas State	New York Mets	6th
2021	Justice Thompson	Southampton '19	North Carolina	Cincinnati Reds	6th
2021	Parker Bates	North Fork '17	Louisiana Tech	Kansas City Royals	9th
2021	Peter Matt	North Fork '17	Duke	Chicago Cubs	10th
2021	River Town	Sag Harbor '19	Dallas Baptist	Kansas City Royals	15th
2021	Jimmy Joyce	Southampton '18	Hofstra	Seattle Mariners	16th
2022	Mario Camilletti	Southampton '19	Oakland	Chicago White Sox	8th
2022	Joe Stewart	Westhampton '19	Michigan State	Los Angeles Angels of Anaheim	9th
2022	Javier Vaz	North Fork '19	LSU Eunice	Kansas City Royals	15th
2022	Bryce Willits	Riverhead '19	St. Mary's	Chicago White Sox	18th
2023	Cory Wall	Southampton '19	William & Mary	Atlanta Braves	8th
2023	Brian Hendry	Riverhead '19	Oklahoma State	New York Yankees	10th
2024	**Sean Keys**	Westhampton '22, '23	Bucknell	Toronto Blue Jays	4th
2024	Justin Sinibaldi	Sag Harbor '21	Rutgers	Chicago White Sox	14th
2026	Jack Turner	Westhampton '23	New Mexico State	Detroit Tigers	10th

Bold = reached major leagues
