= Matt Krook =

American baseball player (born 1994)

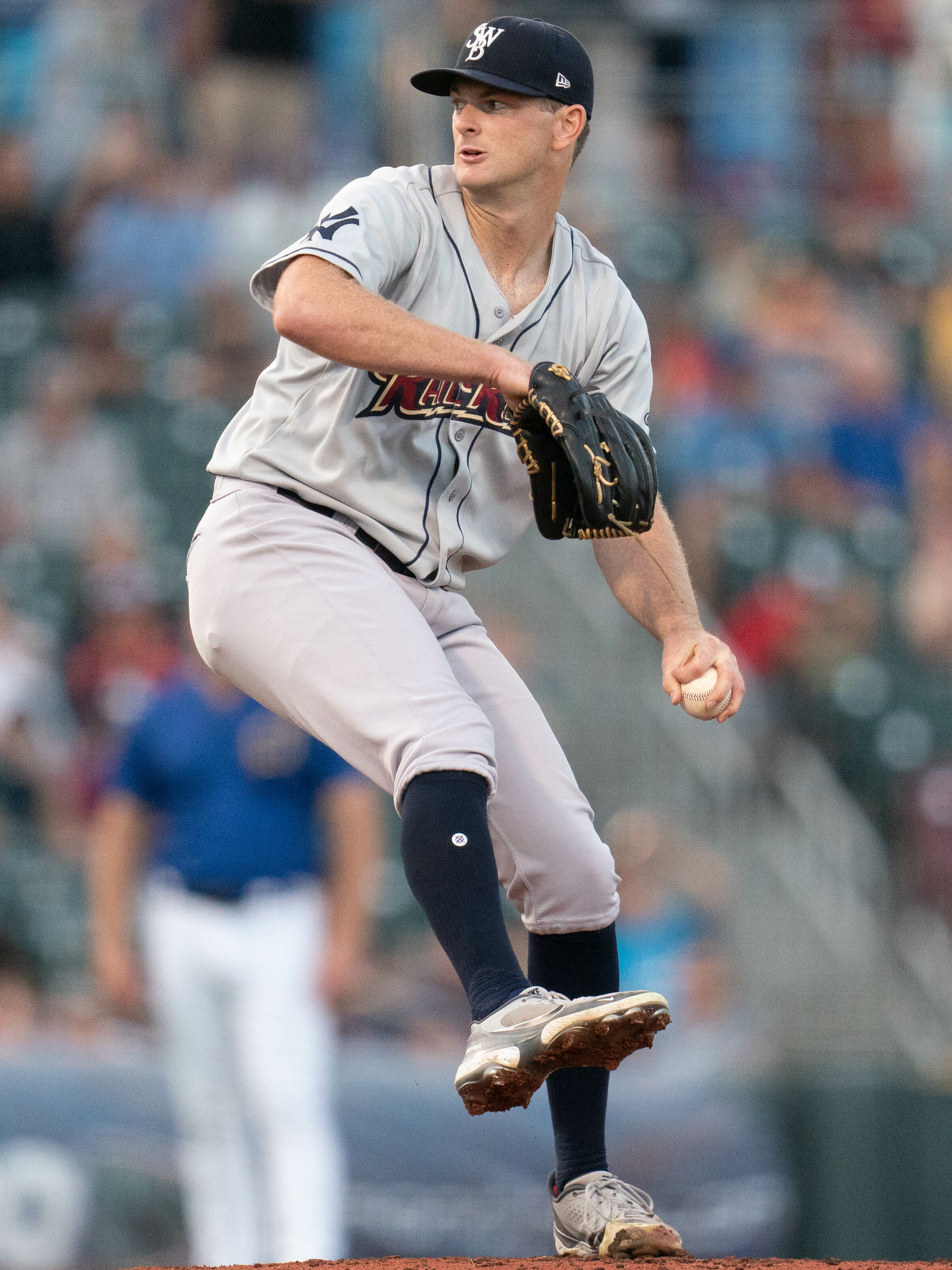
- Krook with the Scranton/Wilkes-Barre RailRiders in 2022

Free agent
- Pitcher
- Born: October 21, 1994 (age 32); Hillsborough, California, U.S.
- Bats: Left Throws: Left

MLB debut
- June 16, 2023, for the New York Yankees

MLB statistics (through 2026 season)
- Win–loss record: 0–1
- Earned run average: 13.50
- Strikeouts: 17
- Stats at Baseball Reference

Teams
- New York Yankees (2023); Baltimore Orioles (2024); Athletics (2025–2026); Washington Nationals (2026)

Matthew Edward Krook (born October 21, 1994) is an American professional baseball pitcher who is a free agent. He has previously played in Major League Baseball (MLB) for the New York Yankees, Baltimore Orioles, Athletics, and Washington Nationals. Krook played college baseball for the Oregon Ducks and was selected by the Miami Marlins in the first round of the 2013 MLB draft and the San Francisco Giants in the fourth round of the 2016 MLB draft.

== Early life ==
Matthew Edward Krook was born on October 21, 1994, in Hillsborough, California. Krook attended St. Ignatius College Preparatory in San Francisco, California, where he played for the baseball team. In his senior year, he had a 2–1 win–loss record with a 1.65 earned run average (ERA). He was named a First Team All-American and All-Region by Perfect Game and was named to the All-State team by MaxPreps. He was considered one of the top prep pitchers eligible for the 2013 MLB draft.

The Miami Marlins selected Krook in the competitive balance round, with the 35th overall pick, of the 2013 Major League Baseball draft. Although he had originally intended to sign with the team, and the two sides had agreed upon a contract, he failed a physical examination due to an unspecified issue with his left shoulder. The Marlins withdrew their offer and Krook declined to accept a reduced signing bonus.

== College career ==
Krook enrolled at the University of Oregon to play college baseball with the Oregon Ducks. He was named a Louisville Slugger First-Team Freshman All-American. He pitched to a 2–1 record and a 1.79 ERA, with 60 strikeouts. Among his highlights that year were an 11-strikeout performance against Loyola Marymount and a quality start where he allowed only five hits in seven innings against Hawaii. Krook's season ended unexpectedly after he felt arm stiffness in a game against Washington State. He elected to undergo Tommy John surgery on April 22, with the procedure done by noted orthopedic surgeon Dr. James Andrews.

Krook did not pitch his sophomore season, although he had expressed interest in playing in the 2015 NCAA tournament and would have agreed to burn his redshirt had the Ducks made it past the Springfield (IL) Regional. In 2015 he played collegiate summer baseball for the Wareham Gatemen of the Cape Cod League where he pitched to an 0–1 record with a 6.35 ERA and 15 strikeouts in six starts.

== Professional career ==
=== Draft and minor leagues ===
The San Francisco Giants selected Krook in the fourth round, with the 125th overall selection, of the 2016 Major League Baseball draft. Krook signed with the Giants, was assigned to the rookie-level Arizona League Giants, and was later promoted to the Low-A Salem-Keizer Volcanoes. He posted a combined 1–4 record with a 5.53 ERA in 13 games (11 starts) between both teams. He spent 2017 with the High-A San Jose Giants where he went 4–9 with a 5.12 ERA in 25 games (17 starts).

On December 20, 2017, the Giants traded Krook, Christian Arroyo, Denard Span, and Stephen Woods Jr. to the Tampa Bay Rays in exchange for Evan Longoria and cash considerations. Krook spent the 2018 season with the Double-A Montgomery Biscuits, pitching to a 4–2 record with a 4.26 ERA in 37 games (six starts). He returned to Montgomery to begin 2019. In 32 appearances (18 starts) for the Biscuits, Krook registered a 2–3 record and 4.50 ERA with 52 strikeouts in 50 innings pitched. He did not play in a game in 2020 due to the cancellation of the minor league season because of the COVID-19 pandemic.

On December 10, 2020, the New York Yankees selected Krook from the Rays in the minor league phase of the Rule 5 draft. He began the 2021 season with the Double-A Somerset Patriots and was promoted to the Triple-A Scranton/Wilkes-Barre RailRiders during the season. He started for Scranton/Wilkes-Barre on Opening Day of the 2022 season. Krook had a 10–7 record and a 4.09 ERA for the RailRiders in 2022. His 155 strikeouts set a new franchise record for a season which was previously held by Carlton Loewer since 1997.

On November 10, 2022, the Yankees added Krook to their 40-man roster to protect him from the Rule 5 draft. Krook was optioned to Triple-A Scranton/Wilkes-Barre to begin the 2023 season. He transitioned into a relief pitcher in 2023. In 12 games, Krook registered a 1.04 ERA with 34 strikeouts in 17 1/3 innings pitched.

=== New York Yankees (2023) ===
On May 27, 2023, Yankees promoted Krook to the major leagues for the first time. He went unused out of the Yankees bullpen and was optioned to Triple-A Scranton on June 1, becoming a phantom ballplayer. On June 8, Krook was recalled after Nestor Cortés was placed on the injured list. On June 16 at Fenway Park, Krook made his major league debut. In four games for the Yankees, he pitched to a 24.75 ERA with three strikeouts across four innings pitched.

On February 13, 2024, Krook was designated for assignment following the waiver claim of Jordan Groshans.

=== Baltimore Orioles (2024) ===
On February 18, 2024, the Yankees traded Krook to the Baltimore Orioles for cash considerations. He was optioned to the Triple-A Norfolk Tides to begin the 2024 season. He was recalled by the Orioles when Corbin Burnes was placed on the paternity list on June 28. He returned to the Tides after surrendering a Wyatt Langford three-run homer in the eighth inning of an 11–2 loss to the Texas Rangers on June 30. Krook was designated for assignment by the Orioles on July 30. He cleared waivers and was sent outright to Norfolk on August 2. Krook elected free agency following the season on November 4.

=== Athletics (2025) ===
On November 15, 2024, Krook signed a minor league contract with the Athletics. He made 12 appearances for the Triple-A Las Vegas Aviators, posting a 3-1 record and 3.21 ERA with 21 strikeouts over 14 innings of work. On May 16, 2025, the Athletics selected Krook's contract, adding him to their active roster. In three appearances for the team, he recorded a 5.40 ERA with three strikeouts across 3 2/3 innings pitched. Krook was designated for assignment by the Athletics on May 27.

=== Cleveland Guardians ===
On May 29, 2025, Krook was claimed off waivers by the Cleveland Guardians. He made 30 appearances for the Triple-A Columbus Clippers, posting a 2-0 record and 3.18 ERA with 40 strikeouts over 34 innings of work. On November 6, Krook was removed from the 40-man roster and sent outright to Columbus; he subsequently rejected the assignment and elected free agency.

=== Second stint with the Athletics (2026) ===
On November 22, 2025, Krook signed a minor league contract with the Athletics. He began the 2026 season with the Triple-A Las Vegas Aviators, compiling a 2-2 record and 3.72 ERA with 42 strikeouts across his first 25 appearances. On June 21, 2026, the Athletics selected Krook's contract, adding him to their active roster. He made five appearances for the team, but struggled to a 14.73 ERA with five strikeouts across 3 2/3 innings pitched. Krook was designated for assignment by the Athletics on July 3.

=== Washington Nationals (2026) ===
On July 4, 2026, the Washington Nationals claimed Krook off of waivers from the Athletics. He made three appearances for Washington, struggling to an 0–1 record and 6.75 ERA with two strikeouts across 2 2/3 innings pitched. Krook was designated for assignment by the Nationals on July 12. He elected free agency after clearing waivers two days later. On July 19, Krook re-signed with Washington on a major league contract. He made three scoreless appearances for the Nationals prior to being designated for assignment on July 27. Krook elected free agency two days later upon clearing waivers. On August 4, he re-signed with the Nationals on another minor league contract. He elected free agency on November 2.

== See also ==
- Rule 5 draft results
