= North Fork Ospreys =

North Fork Ospreys
Founded	2009
Ballpark	Cochran Park
Based in	Peconic, NY
Team Colors	Blue and Gold
League	Atlantic Collegiate Baseball League
HCB Championships	2010
ACBL Championships	2010

The North Fork Ospreys are a summer collegiate baseball team; one of the seven teams organized by Hamptons Collegiate Baseball (HCB), an NCAA-sanctioned collegiate summer baseball league. The team plays its home games in Cochran Park, Peconic, New York.

== History ==
The North Fork Ospreys were introduced as a four-team expansion to the Hampton Division in 2009. In 2009, the Ospreys finished first in the Hampton Division under the management of Shawn Epidendio with a record of 25-15. They defeated the Riverhead Tomcats in the semi-final but lost to the Westhampton Aviators in the Hamptons Division Championship Series, 1-2.

Epidendio led the Ospreys to another first-place finish in 2010, going 27-13, a division record. They ousted the Southampton Breakers in the semi-final and defeated the Riverhead Tomcats in the Championship Series to claim their first Hamptons Division Championship Title. They went on to face the Wolff Division's Quakertown Blazers in the Atlantic Collegiate Baseball League (ACBL) Championship Series. They swept the Blazers in the best-of-three series to capture North Fork's first ACBL Title.

In 2011, Brian Hansen, formerly the assistant coach, took over the management of the Ospreys. He was assisted by former Dutch pro-league pitcher, Michiel van Kampen. Hurt by an eight-game losing streak in the middle of the season, the Ospreys finished tied for third in the Hamptons Division with a 20-20 record. They defeated the Southampton Breakers in the semi-finals but again lost to the Westhampton Aviators in the Championship Series.

== Records ==
2019

Wins  Losses

Home 0 2

Away 0 2

Total 0 4

2011

	Wins	Losses
Home	9	11
Away	11	9
Total	20	20

2010

	Wins	Losses
Home	12	8
Away	15	5
Total	27	13

2009

	Wins	Losses
Home	15	5
Away	10	10
Total	25	15

== Alumni ==
- Andrew Cain (UNC-Wilmington); an outfielder for the 2009 Ospreys; drafted in the 12th round (371st overall) of the 2011 MLB Amateur Player Draft by the Milwaukee Brewers.
