= Atlantic Collegiate Baseball League =

Collegiate summer baseball league

- Sport: Baseball
- Founded: 1967; 59 years ago
- Motto: Gateway To Professional Baseball
- No. of teams: 14
- Country: United States
- Most recent champion: New Brunswick Matrix (2025)
- Website: http://www.acblbaseball.org

The Atlantic Collegiate Baseball League (ACBL) is a collegiate summer baseball league operating in the Mid-Atlantic region of the United States. The league has experienced moderate success in having alumni appear in Major League Baseball.

The ACBL is one of twelve leagues in the National Alliance of College Summer Baseball.

== Teams ==
The teams participating in the 2026 season are:

Division	Team	City
Kaiser Division	BT Cyclones	Yaphank, New York
Kaiser Division	East Coast Sandhogs	Scranton, Pennsylvania
Kaiser Division	Hitters Club Hawkeyes	Massapequa, New York
Kaiser Division	LIB Neptunes	Long Island, New York
Kaiser Division	New York Collegians	Long Island, New York
Wolff Division	Essex Legends	Newark, New Jersey
Wolff Division	Jersey Shore Stallions	Lavallette, New Jersey
Wolff Division	Linden Tigers	Linden, New Jersey
Wolff Division	New Jersey Sugar Kings	New Jersey

== Former teams ==
Many different teams have played in the ACBL throughout the history of the league. The following is a list of former teams: Allentown Wings, Atlantic Whitecaps, Bayside Blue Claws, Bergen Metros, Berkshire Red Sox, Brooklyn Clippers, Brooklyn-Queens Dodgers, Connecticut Yankees, Delaware Valley Gulls, Jersey City Colonels, Kutztown Rockies, Lehigh Valley Catz, Long Island Collegians, Long Island Flying A's, Long Island Nationals, Long Island Sound, Long Island Stars, Mercer Titans, Metro New York Cadets, Monmouth Royals, Mt. Vernon Generals, Nassau Collegians, New Brunswick Matrix, New Jersey A's, New Jersey Colts, New York Crush, New York Generals, New York Phenoms, New York Valor, Ocean Ospreys, Old Town Road Patriots, Peekskill Robins, Scranton Red Soxx, Staten Island Tide, Teaneck Teamsters, Torrington Titans, and West Deptford Green Storm.

== Major league alumni ==
Table key
AS	Indicates an MLB All-Star
CY	Indicates a Cy Young Award winner
HOF	Indicates a members of the National Baseball Hall of Fame

- Nick Ahmed, infielder
- Garvin Alston, pitcher
- Scott Arnold, pitcher
- Mike Avilés, infielder
- Kevin Baez, infielder
- Kevin Barry, pitcher
- Kevin Bearse, pitcher
- Jason Bergmann, pitcher
- Craig Biggio, infielder (AS, HOF)
- Frank Brooks, pitcher
- Terry Bross, pitcher
- Kirk Bullinger, pitcher
- Nate Bump, pitcher
- Fred Cambria, pitcher
- Cody Carroll, pitcher
- Kevin Cash, catcher
- Rick Cerone, catcher
- Vinnie Chulk, pitcher
- Mark Ciardi, pitcher
- Frank Cimorelli, pitcher
- Jeff Datz, catcher
- Doug Davis, infielder
- Jason Dellaero, infielder
- Rich DeLucia, pitcher
- Mark DiFelice, pitcher
- Benny Distefano, player
- John Doherty, pitcher
- Angel Echevarria, outfielder
- Brad Eldred, infielder
- Frank Eufemia, pitcher
- Steve Falteisek, pitcher
- John Flaherty, catcher
- Scott Forster, pitcher
- Willie Fraser, pitcher
- Danny Garcia, outfielder
- Ray Giannelli, infielder
- Keith Glauber, pitcher
- Zack Godley, pitcher
- Don Gordon, pitcher
- Reid Gorecki, outfielder
- Tom Gregorio, catcher
- Kevin Gryboski, pitcher
- John Halama, pitcher
- Craig Hansen, pitcher
- Pete Harnisch, pitcher (AS)
- Joel Johnston, pitcher
- Skip Jutze, catcher
- Pat Kelly, infielder
- Matt Kinzer, pitcher
- Phil Klein, pitcher
- Mike Koplove, pitcher
- Kyle Kubitza, infielder
- Jeff Kunkel, infielder
- Al Lachowicz, pitcher
- Rick Lancellotti, infielder
- John Lannan, pitcher
- Gene Larkin, player
- Dennis Leonard, pitcher
- Brian Lesher, outfielder
- Brian Looney, pitcher
- Mike Loynd, pitcher
- Rob Lukachyk, pinch hitter
- Zach Lutz, infielder
- Joe Martinez, pitcher
- Jim Mecir, pitcher
- Frank Menechino, infielder
- Ray Montgomery, outfielder
- Dan Morogiello, pitcher
- Matt Morris, pitcher (AS)
- Jamie Moyer, pitcher (AS)
- Terry Mulholland, pitcher (AS)
- Sean Nolin, pitcher
- Keith Osik, catcher
- Charlie Puleo, pitcher
- Steve Ratzer, pitcher
- Chris Reed, pitcher
- C. J. Riefenhauser, pitcher
- Wayne Rosenthal, pitcher
- Mo Sanford, pitcher
- Jeff Schaefer, infielder
- Rich Scheid, pitcher
- Davis Schneider, infielder
- Frank Schwindel, infielder
- Frank Seminara, pitcher
- Jim Stoops, pitcher
- Drew Sutton, outfielder
- Nick Tropeano, pitcher
- Bob Tufts, pitcher
- John Valentin, infielder
- Anthony Varvaro, pitcher
- Frank Viola, pitcher (AS, CY)
- Ryan Vogelsong, pitcher (AS)
- Pete Walker, pitcher
- Allen Watson, pitcher
- Walt Weiss, infielder (AS)
- Ed Whited, infielder
- Darrin Winston, pitcher
- Ron Witmeyer, infielder
- Eric Young, infielder (AS)
- Pete Zoccolillo, outfielder
