= International Bowl =

International Bowl (defunct)
- Stadium: Rogers Centre
- Location: Toronto, Ontario
- Operated: 2007–2010
- Conference tie-ins: Big East, Mid-American
- Payout: US$750,000 (2008)

The International Bowl was a National Collegiate Athletic Association (NCAA) collegiate American football bowl game played in Toronto from 2007 through 2010. During its run, it was the only post-season bowl game played outside the United States, the first such game since the Bacardi Bowl, played in Cuba on January 1, 1937. The game pitted teams from the Big East and Mid-American Conferences, with the Big East winning all four match-ups.

== History ==
In 2004, a partnership led by the city of Toronto bid to host a bowl game in Toronto, to help the city recover from its loss of tourism dollars due to the 2003 SARS outbreak. The NCAA sanctioned the new Poinsettia Bowl in San Diego, instead; Toronto re-launched its bid in 2005 and was successful, playing its first game at the end of the 2006 season.

The bowl signed agreements with two Division I conferences to provide teams: The Big East Conference, a BCS conference, and the Mid-American Conference. Both conferences are composed of schools in the American Midwest and Northeast, with the exception of Big East school South Florida. One Big East member, Cincinnati, is a former member of the MAC (conversely, the MAC had one former Big East member during the game's tenure – Temple, who later rejoined the Big East).

The 2009 International Bowl was notable in that the Buffalo Bulls (champions of the Mid-American Conference) appeared in the first bowl game in the history of the school. The Bulls turned down their only other bowl invitation, the 1958 Tangerine Bowl, as the black players on the team were not going to be permitted to play.

After the bowl could not renew its contract with the BCS member Big East Conference, officials decided to cease the contest. It was hoped that the bowl could be revived later on, but the Big East's contract with the new Pinstripe Bowl complicated matters. The MAC's tie in was inherited by the Humanitarian Bowl.

In all four editions of the International Bowl, the Big East representative defeated the MAC representative, with only the first game decided by fewer than 18 points.

== Venue ==
The International Bowl was played at Rogers Centre. It was the first football game of significance to be played in Canada under American football rules since Simon Fraser University's football team left the National Association of Intercollegiate Athletics in 2001, and joined CIS, where Canadian universities play under Canadian football rules.

== Trophy ==
The International Bowl trophy (2009)

The winner of the International Bowl was presented with a trophy similar in design to the International Bowl logo. A Canadian maple leaf formed the back of the trophy, with a small crystal football set offset to the right. The name of the winning team was placed on a plaque attached to the lower part of the trophy.

== Game results ==
Date	Winner		Loser		Attendance	Notes
January 6, 2007	Cincinnati	27	Western Michigan	24	26,717	notes
January 5, 2008	Rutgers	52	Ball State	30	31,455	notes
January 3, 2009	Connecticut	38	Buffalo	20	40,184	notes
January 2, 2010	South Florida	27	Northern Illinois	3	22,185	notes

== MVPs ==
Date	MVP	School	Position
2007	Dominick Goodman	Cincinnati	WR
2008	Ray Rice	Rutgers	RB
2009	Donald Brown	Connecticut	RB
2010	Mike Ford	USF	RB

== Most appearances ==
Rank	Team	Appearances	Record
T1	Cincinnati	1	1–0
T1	Connecticut	1	1–0
T1	Rutgers	1	1–0
T1	South Florida	1	1–0
T5	Ball State	1	0–1
T5	Buffalo	1	0–1
T5	Northern Illinois	1	0–1
T5	Western Michigan	1	0–1

== Television ==
ESPN carried the International Bowl across its family of networks for the entirety of the bowl's history. Since the game was in Canada, the network chose to use its Canadian-born commentators or ones that had some connection to Canadian football. Toronto native John Saunders called the game for its first three playings, while CFL Hall of Famer Doug Flutie was a color commentator three times and Nepean, Ontario native Jesse Palmer was there for two of the games. With the exception of the inaugural playing, a Canadian served as the sideline reporter; Ontario natives Stacey Dales and David Amber were part of the festivities.

Date	Network	Play-by-play announcer	Color commentator(s)	Sideline reporter
January 2, 2010	ESPN2	Mike Gleason	John Congemi	David Amber
January 3, 2009	ESPN2	John Saunders	Doug Flutie and Jesse Palmer	David Amber
January 5, 2008	ESPN2	John Saunders	Doug Flutie and Jesse Palmer	Stacey Dales
January 6, 2007	ESPN2	John Saunders	Craig James and Doug Flutie	Todd Harris

== Radio ==
Date	Network	Play-by-play announcer	Color commentator(s)	Sideline reporter
January 2, 2010	TBC Sports	Will Tieman	Chuck Ealey	
January 3, 2009	TBC Sports	Will Tieman	Chuck Ealey	
January 5, 2008	TBC Sports	Will Tieman	Chuck Ealey	
January 6, 2007	TBC Sports	Will Tieman	Chuck Ealey	

== Local Radio ==
Date	Teams	Flagship station	Play-by-play announcer	Color commentator(s)	Sideline reporter
January 2, 2010	South Florida–Northern Illinois				
January 3, 2009	Buffalo–Connecticut				
January 5, 2008	Rutgers–Ball State	WCTC-AM (Rutgers); WLBC-FM (Ball State)	Chris Carlin; Morry Mannies		
January 6, 2007	Western Michigan–Cincinnati				

== Photo gallery ==
=== 2007 ===
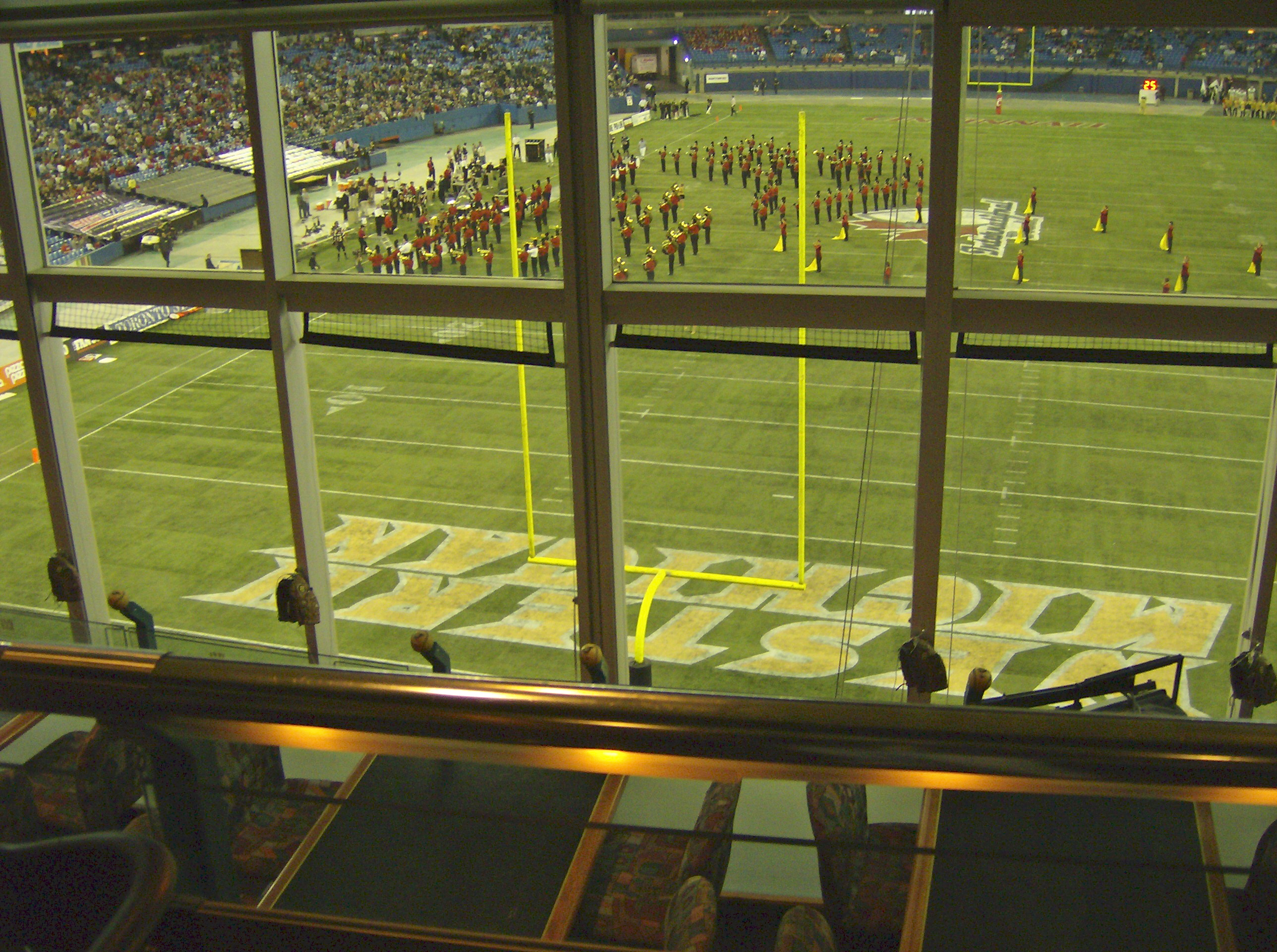
Looking at the University of Cincinnati band from Windows restaurant.

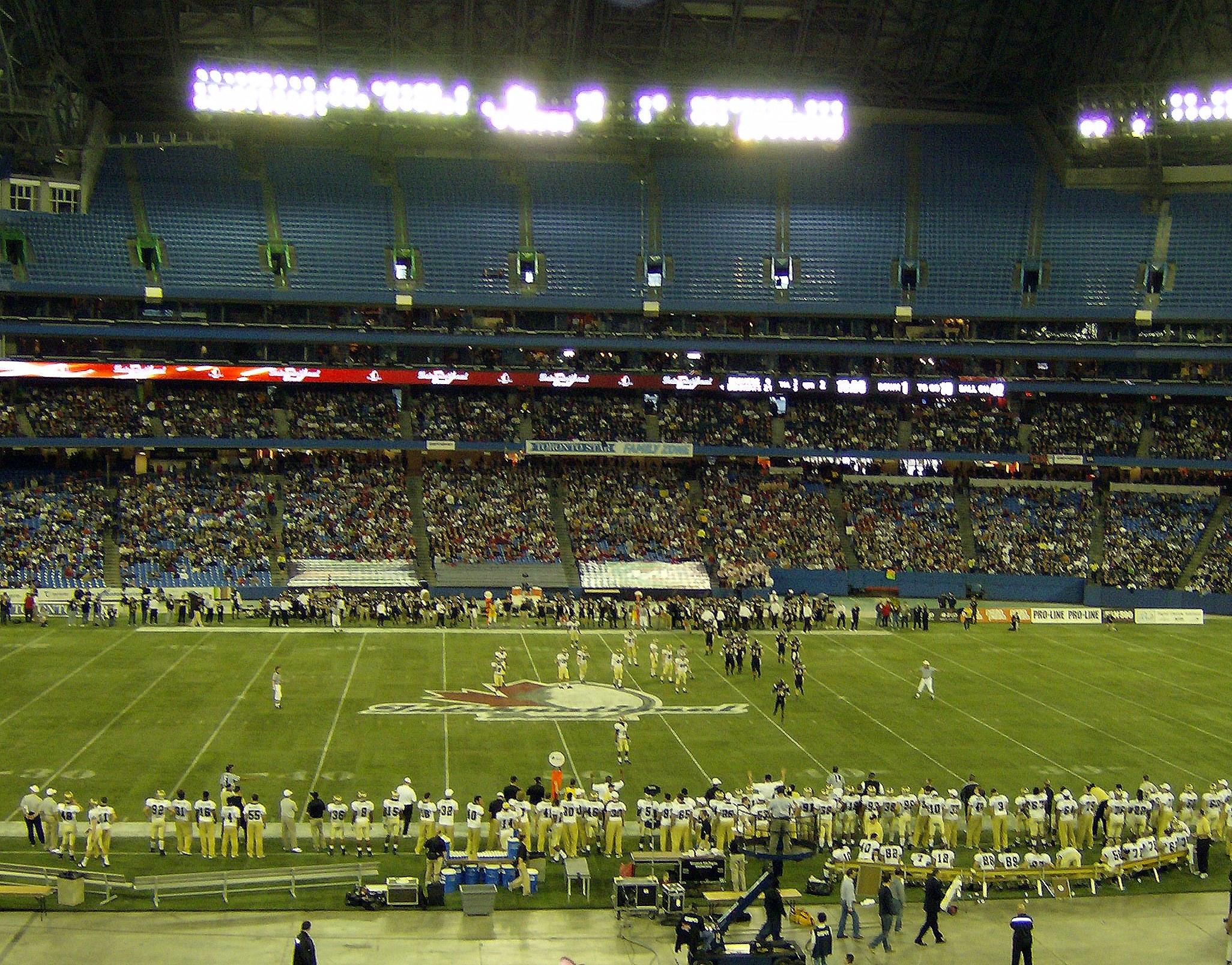
Looking at the fifty-yard line.

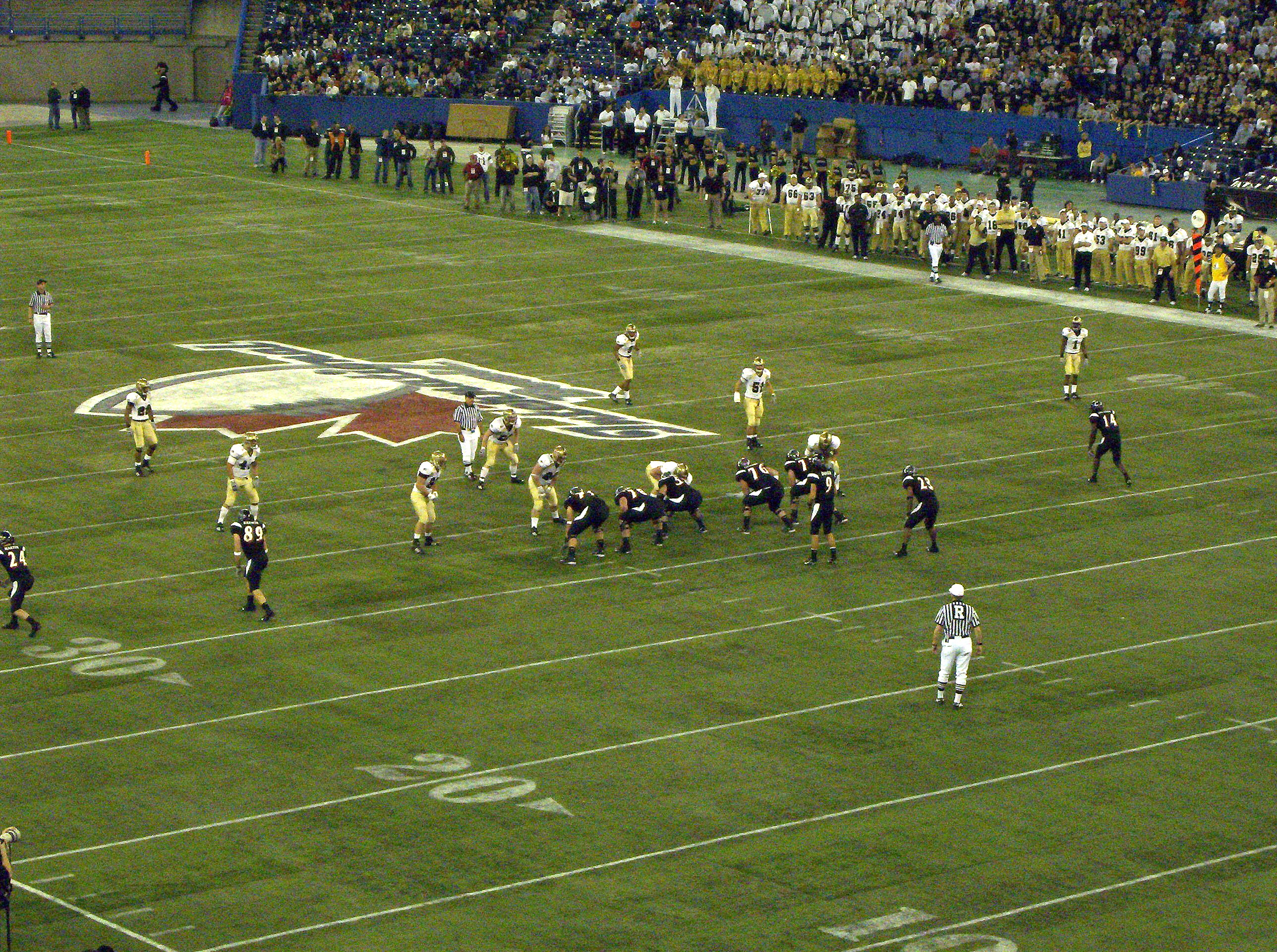
WMU defends against the Cincinnati shotgun.

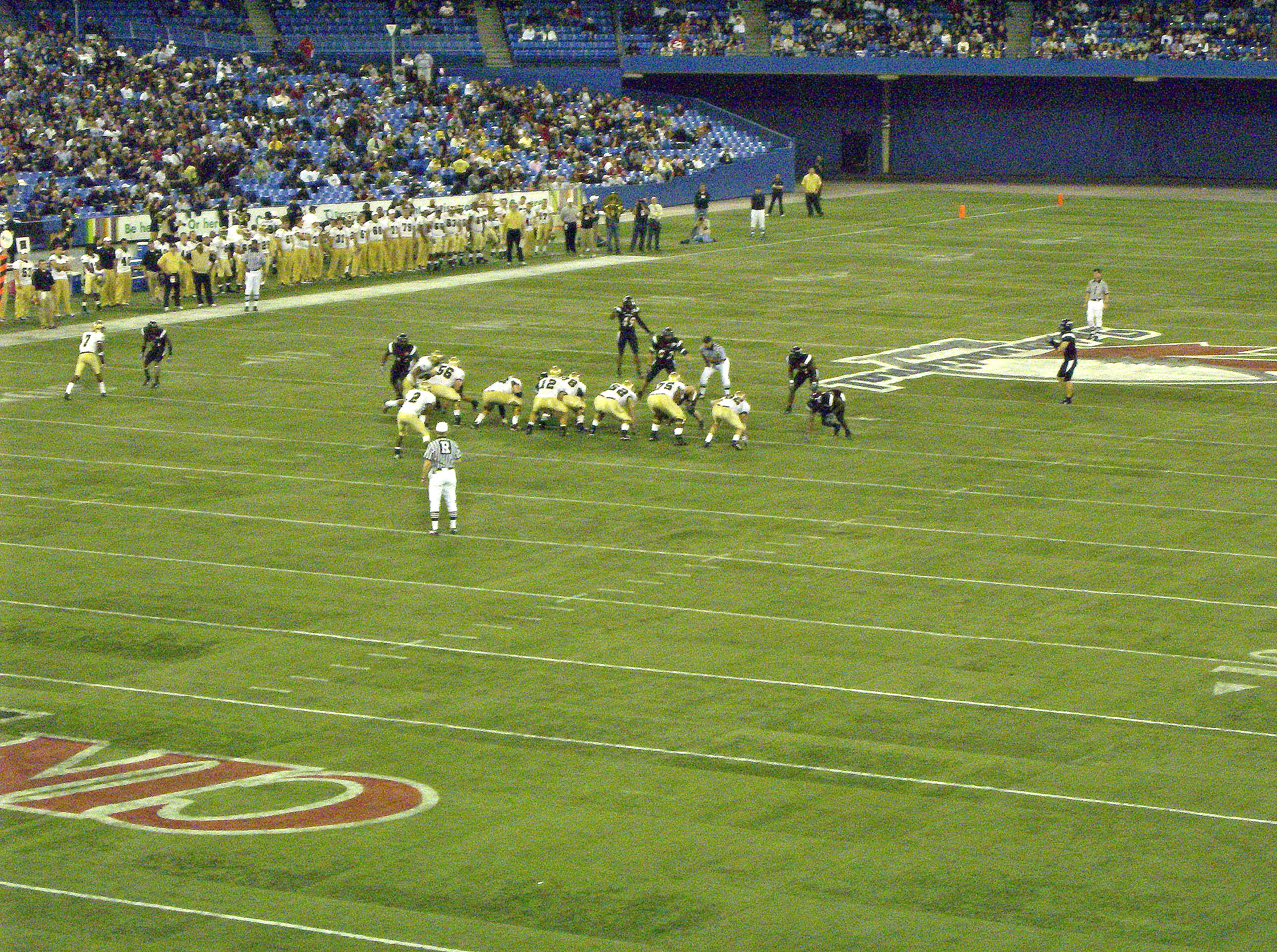
WMU on offense.

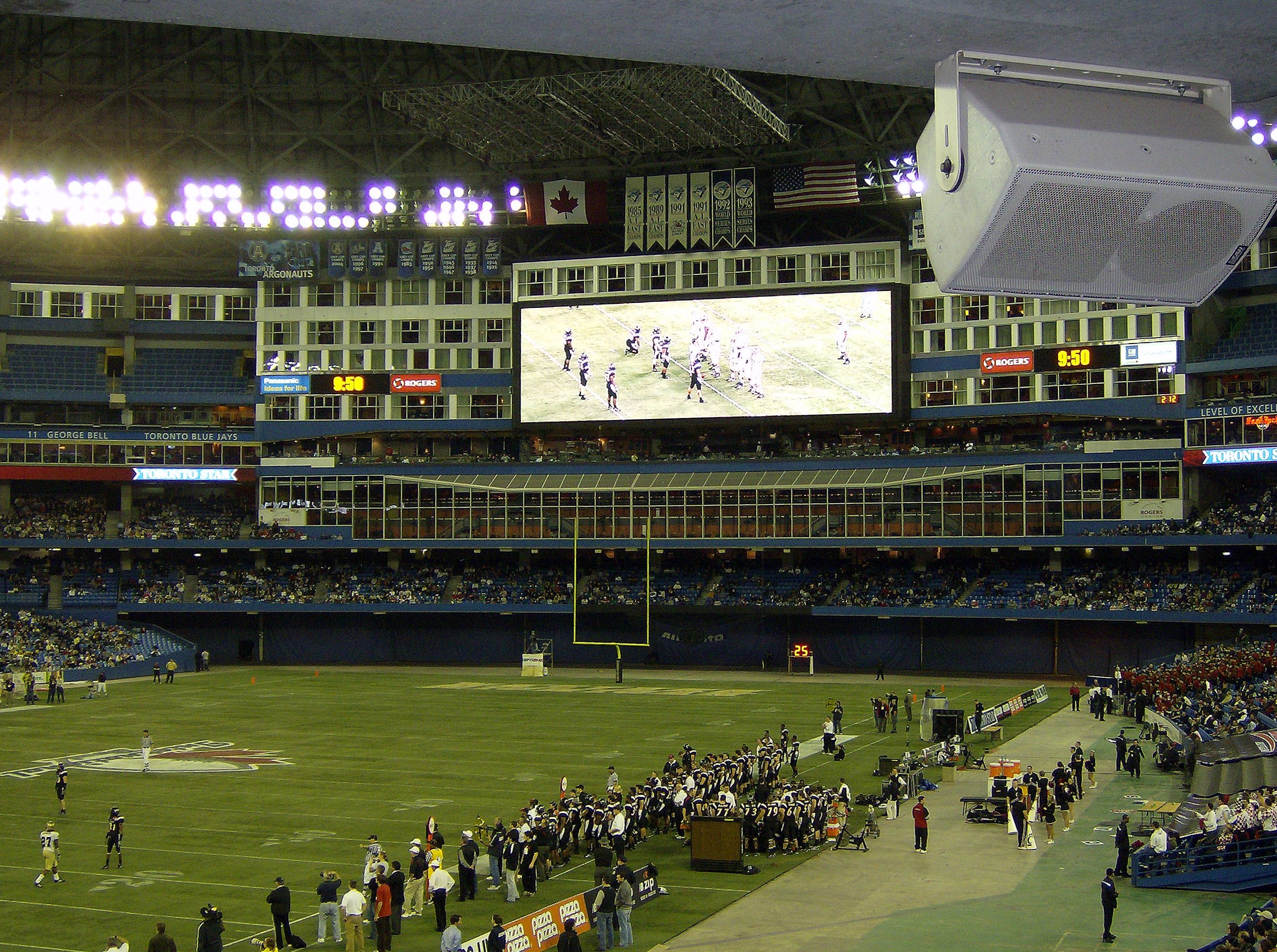
Rogers Centre video scoreboard follows the play.

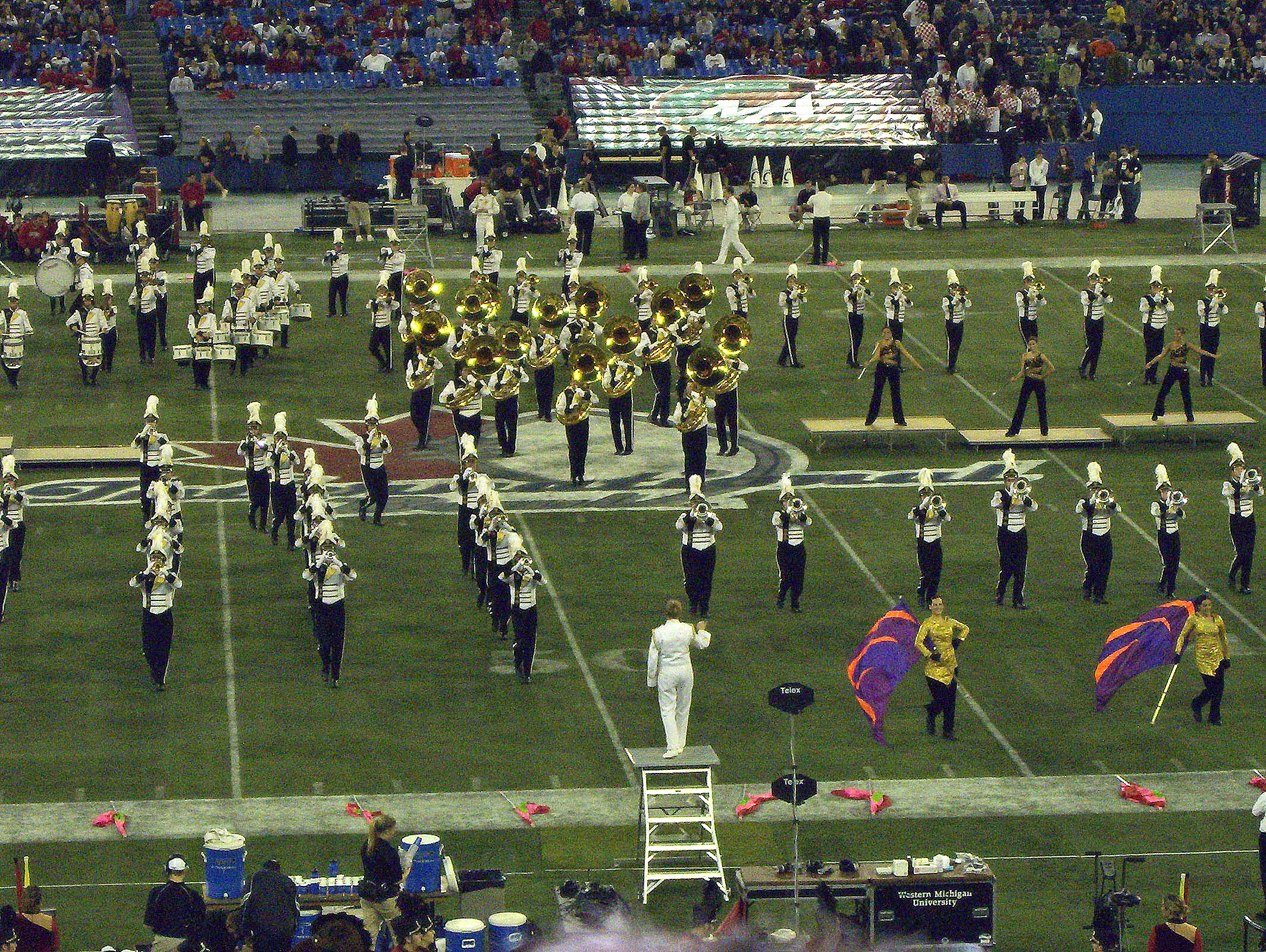
WMU band at half time.

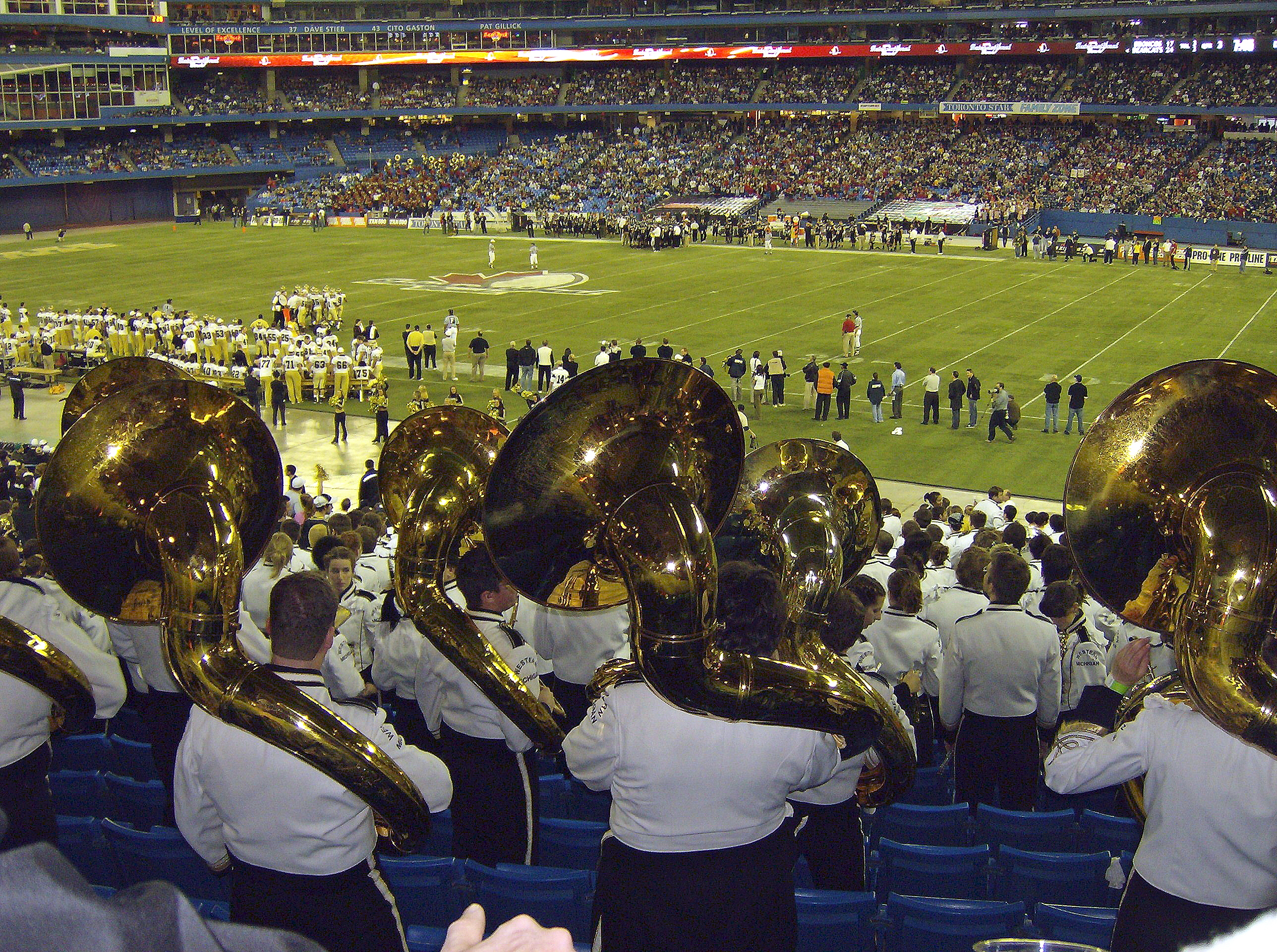
WMU band cheers Broncos from the stands.

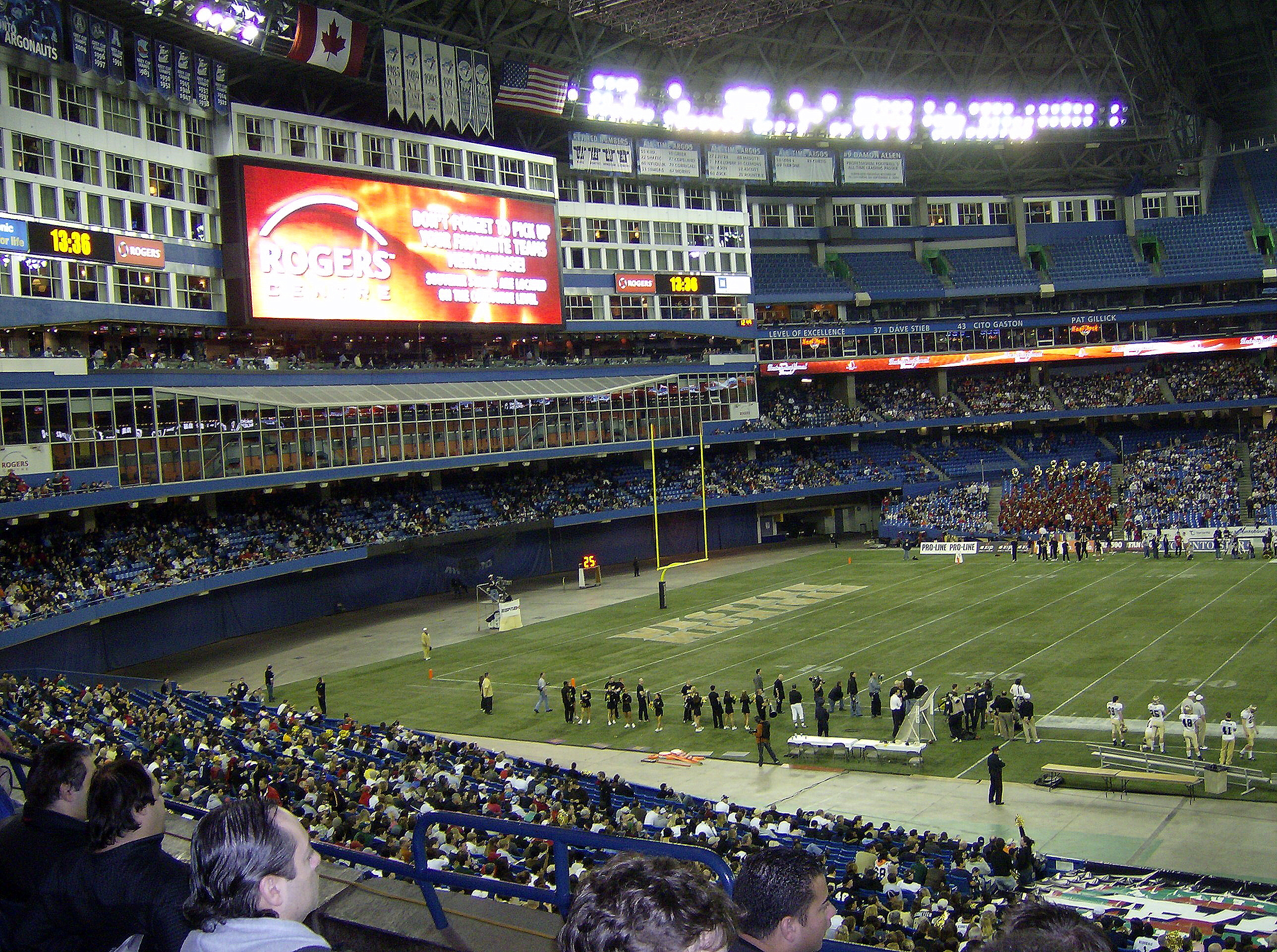
Concrete is exposed beyond the end zones and side lines because the field was shortened and narrowed from Canadian football to American football dimensions.

=== 2009 ===
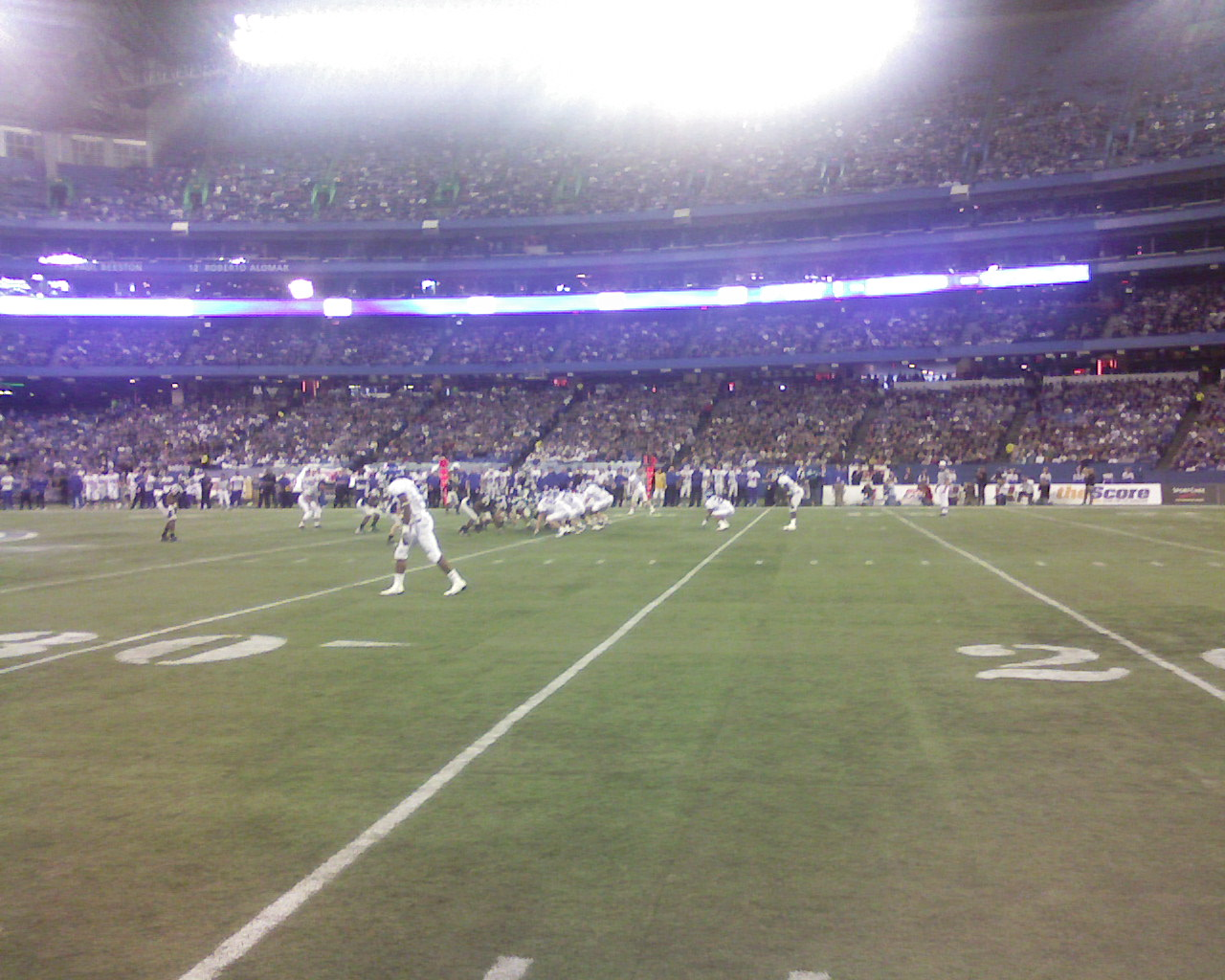
Connecticut versus Buffalo

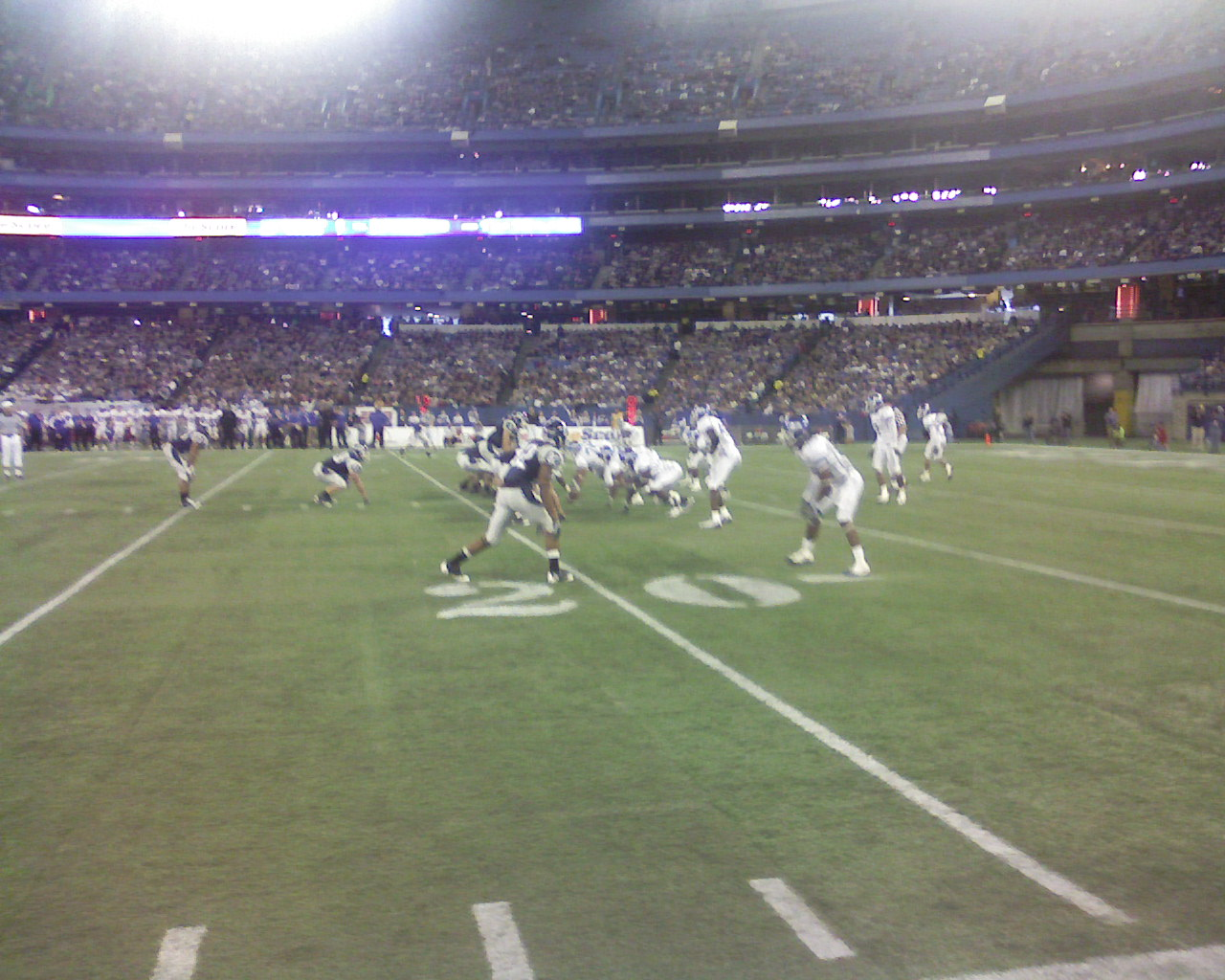
Huskies in blue versus Bulls in white
