= 2010 International Bowl =

- Bowl game
South Florida Bulls	Northern Illinois Huskies
(7–5)	(7–5)
27	3
Head coach: Jim Leavitt	Head coach: Jerry Kill
	1	2	3	4	Total
South Florida	3	0	10	14	27
Northern Illinois	0	3	0	0	3
- Date: January 2, 2010
- Season: 2009
- Stadium: Rogers Centre
- Location: Toronto, Ontario
- MVP: Mike Ford, USF (RB)
- Referee: Adrian Hill (Big 12)
- Attendance: 22,185
- Payout: US$750,000

United States TV coverage
- Network: ESPN2

The 2010 International Bowl was the fourth and final edition of the college football bowl game, and was played at Rogers Centre in Toronto, Ontario, Canada. The game started at 12:00 p.m. US EST on Saturday, January 2, 2010. The game was telecast on ESPN2 and the South Florida Bulls defeated the Northern Illinois Huskies 27–3.

Both teams played in their first International Bowl. South Florida played in their fifth consecutive bowl game. They were previously 2-2 in bowl games and were coming off a 41–14 victory over Memphis in the 2008 St. Petersburg Bowl. Northern Illinois made its fourth bowl appearance in six years. The Huskies were defeated 17–10 by Louisiana Tech in the previous years' Independence Bowl.

The game was the third meeting between the two schools. In 2001, South Florida's first game as an NCAA Division I-A team was at Northern Illinois; NIU won 20–17 on a last-second field goal. One year later, South Florida defeated the Huskies 37–6 in Tampa.

== Game summary ==
Mike Ford ran for a career-high 207 yards and scored one touchdown, B. J. Daniels threw two scoring passes to A. J. Love, and South Florida beat Northern Illinois 27–3 in the International Bowl. Carlton Mitchell caught six passes for 94 yards for the Bulls, who won back-to-back bowls for the first time. South Florida scored 24 unanswered points in the second half after the teams traded field goals in a dreary first half.

It's the third straight year a Big East running back has topped 200 yards in the International Bowl. Ray Rice of Rutgers turned pro after rushing for a game-record 280 yards and four touchdowns in 2007, while Connecticut's Donald Brown ran for 261 yards in last year's game.

Northern Illinois running back Chad Spann carried 20 times for 93 yards, giving him 1,038 for the season. However, the USF defense came up big all day giving up only 238 yards of offense for the game.

=== Scoring summary ===
Scoring Play	Score
1st quarter
USF – Eric Scwartz 39-yard field goal, 10:17	USF 3–0
2nd quarter
NIU – Mike Salerno 21-yard field goal, 13:19	TIE 3–3
3rd quarter
USF – Eric Schwartz 19-yard field goal, 10:35	USF 6–3
USF – A. J. Love 46 yard Pass From B. J. Daniels (Eric Schwartz PAT), 5:12	USF 13–3
4th quarter
USF – A. J. Love 7 yard Pass From B. J. Daniels (Eric Schwartz PAT), 14:55	USF 20–3
USF – Mike Ford 24 yard Run (Eric Schwartz PAT), 6:25	USF 27–3

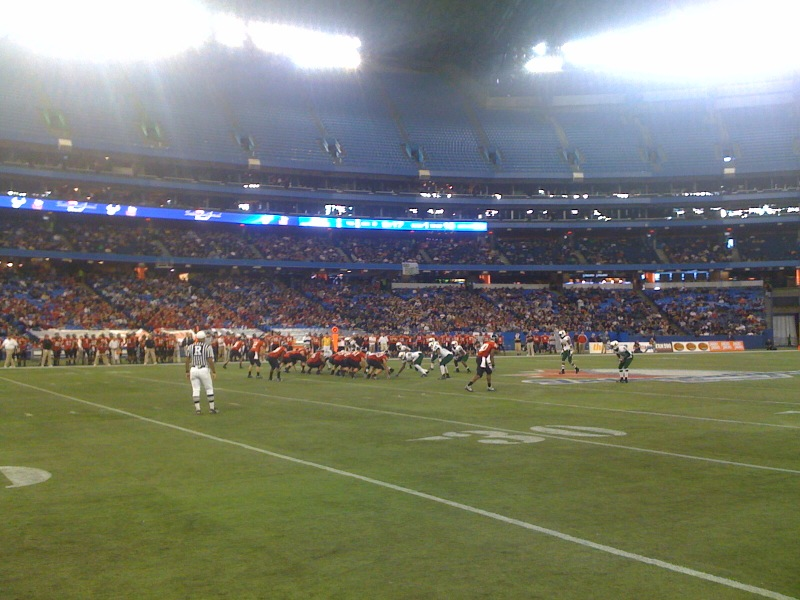
Northern Illinois Huskies (in red) vs South Florida Bulls (in white)

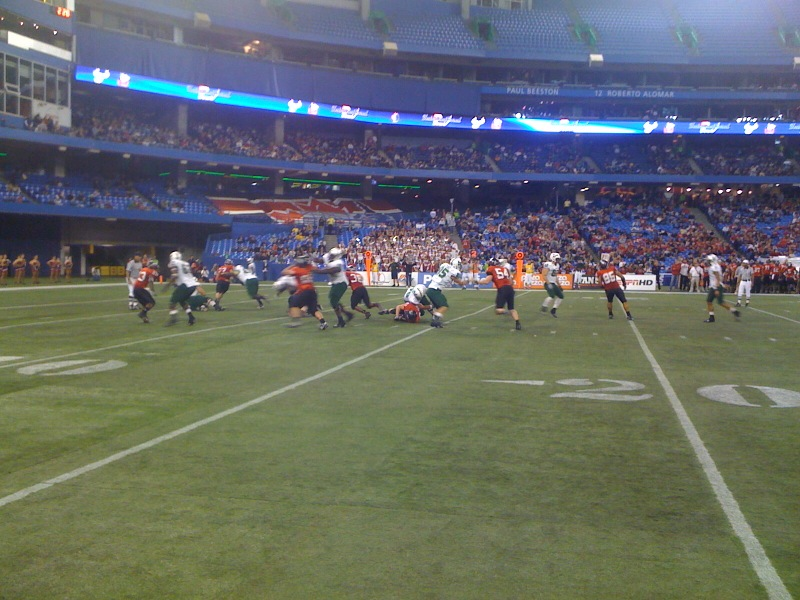
Huskies vs Bulls

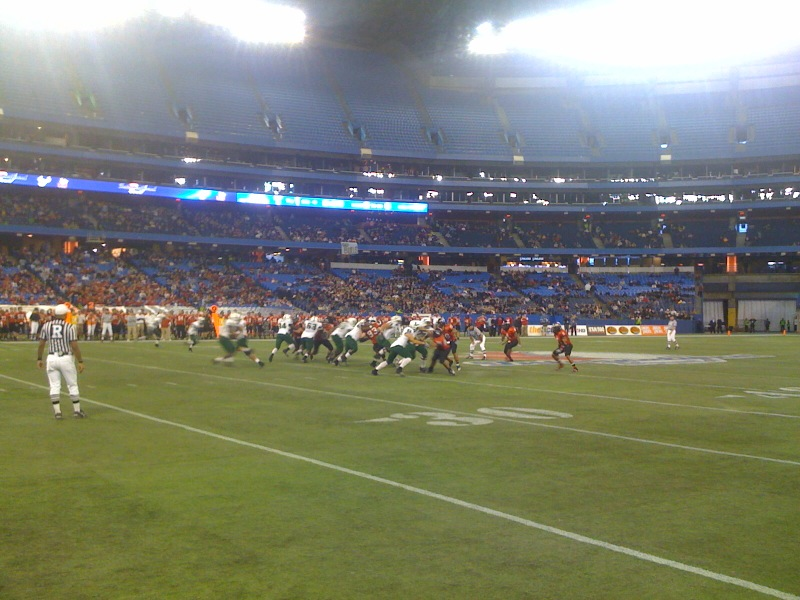
Huskies vs Bulls
