= 2009 International Bowl =

- Bowl game
Buffalo Bulls	Connecticut Huskies
(8–5)	(7–5)
20	38
Head coach: Turner Gill	Head coach: Randy Edsall
	1	2	3	4	Total
Buffalo	0	20	0	0	20
Connecticut	7	10	7	14	38
- Date: January 3, 2009
- Season: 2008
- Stadium: Rogers Centre
- Location: Toronto, Canada
- MVP: Donald Brown, Connecticut (RB)
- Favorite: Connecticut by 4.5
- Referee: Brad Allen (ACC)
- Attendance: 40,184
- Payout: US$750,000 per team

United States TV coverage
- Network: ESPN2
- Announcers: John Saunders, Jesse Palmer, Doug Flutie
- Nielsen ratings: 1.8

International TV coverage
- Network: The Score

The 2009 International Bowl was a postseason college football bowl game between the Connecticut Huskies (UConn) and the Buffalo Bulls at Rogers Centre in Toronto, Canada, on January 3, 2009. The game was the final contest of the 2008 NCAA Division I-Football Bowl Subdivision (Division I-FBS) football season (Note: In August 2006 the NCAA changed the name of Division I-A to Football Bowl Subdivision (FBS) and Division I-AA to Football Championship Subdivision (FCS). In this article the old names are used when referring to events before August 2006; the new names are used when referring to events after August 2006.) for both teams, and ended in a 38–20 victory for Connecticut. UConn represented the Big East Conference (Big East) in the game; Buffalo entered as the Mid-American Conference (MAC) champion.

Connecticut was selected as a participant in the 2009 International Bowl following a 7–5 regular season where they won their first five games, only to lose five of their last seven contests. Facing the Huskies were the Buffalo Bulls with a regular season record of 8–5, highlighted by an upset win over then-No. 12 (Note: All rankings are based on the Associated Press (AP) Poll unless otherwise noted.) and undefeated Ball State in the 2008 MAC Championship Game. Pre-game media coverage focused on the legacy of the 1958 Buffalo Bulls, the first team from the university to be invited to a bowl game. When told that the two African-American members of the team would not be allowed to play because of segregation, the team elected to refuse the bowl bid. Buffalo would not play in a bowl until this game, 50 years later.

The game began at 12:00 p.m. EST. Connecticut, led by running back Donald Brown's 208 yards rushing, dominated the first half statistically, but found themselves down 20–10 midway through the second quarter because they committed six fumbles, five of which were recovered by Buffalo. UConn would close the gap to 20–17 by halftime, and take the lead for good late in the third quarter off a 4-yard touchdown pass from quarterback Tyler Lorenzen to tight end Steve Brouse. The Connecticut victory was sealed when, late in the fourth quarter, Buffalo quarterback Drew Willy threw a pass that was intercepted by UConn safety Dahna Deleston and returned 100 yards for a touchdown.

UConn junior running back Donald Brown was named player of the game. He finished with 261 rushing yards and one touchdown; his 2,083 rushing yards for the 2008 season was best in the NCAA. Following the game, Brown declared his eligibility for the 2009 NFL draft; he would become the first Connecticut player ever drafted in the first round. Three other UConn players were drafted in the second round.

== Team selection ==
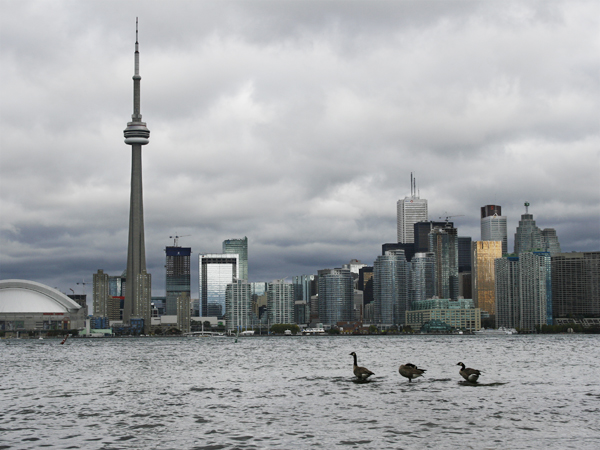
Toronto, home of the International Bowl

The International Bowl had contracts with the Big East and Mid-American Conferences that allowed them to select one team from each conference to participate in their annual game. By virtue of being the Big East champion Cincinnati was awarded an automatic Bowl Championship Series berth; they would play in the 2009 Orange Bowl. The Gator Bowl and Sun Bowl shared the second pick of Big East teams; after the Gator Bowl opted to select Big 12 member Nebraska and the Sun Bowl learned that they would not be allowed to select Notre Dame, Pittsburgh received the Sun Bowl invitation. The Meineke Car Care Bowl, which had the third selection, picked West Virginia. The fourth, fifth, and sixth selections of Big East teams belonged collectively to the International Bowl, PapaJohns.com Bowl, and St. Petersburg Bowl, which, in consultation with the Big East, decided which schools were the best fit for each bowl. There were three remaining bowl-eligible Big East teams: Connecticut, Rutgers, and South Florida. The previous season, Rutgers had played in the International Bowl and South Florida had appeared in the PapaJohns.com Bowl; bowls in general dislike inviting the same team in consecutive years, on the theory that fans are less likely to want to travel to the same destination they were at the year before. Additionally, the St. Petersburg Bowl, in its inaugural year, sought to have local team South Florida play in their game to drive local attendance. Therefore, the teams were apportioned among the bowls as follows: South Florida to the St. Petersburg Bowl, Rutgers to the PapaJohns.com Bowl, and Connecticut to the International Bowl. On December 7, 2008, UConn formally accepted the bowl invitation, the third in their history.

Buffalo accepted an invitation to the International Bowl following their victory over then-undefeated Ball State in the 2008 MAC Championship Game. Although in past years the MAC champion had been invited to the Motor City Bowl, Buffalo preferred to go to the International Bowl due to Toronto being closer to the school than Detroit, the home of the Motor City Bowl. The game marked the first bowl for the Bulls after their first MAC Championship since moving to Division I-A and joining the MAC in 1999.

The Bulls and Huskies had been frequent opponents during the previous decade as both programs made the transition from Division I-AA to Division I-A. The two teams played each other in six consecutive seasons from 1999 to 2005, with Connecticut winning five of the six contents. The 2005 game, won by UConn 38–0, was the most recent meeting between the two teams. Overall, the Huskies and Bulls had played each other 16 times since their first meeting in 1939, with Connecticut holding a 12–4 advantage in the all-time series. Prior to the 2008 season, Buffalo and UConn had signed a contract to play a four-game, home-and-home series beginning in 2010.

=== Buffalo ===
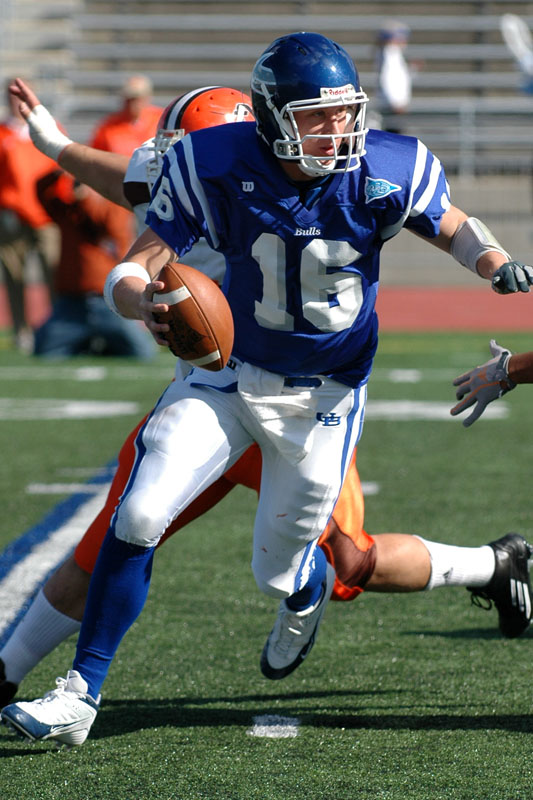
Buffalo quarterback Drew Willy, in 2005

Entering 2008, the Bulls sought to build off of their 2007 season, where they shared the MAC East championship but did not appear in the championship game due to a 31–28 loss to fellow division co-champion Miami (Ohio). Their 5–7 final record, while not good enough to qualify for a bowl game, was still the best by a Buffalo team since they had moved up to Division I-A in 1999. With 10 starters returning on offense and eight on defense, the 2008 team was predicted to be perhaps the most talented team in Bulls history; however, due to their challenging schedule, their final record was predicted to be no better than 3–9.

Buffalo opened the season stronger than expected, with a dominant home win over the University of Texas-El Paso (UTEP), 42–17. This was followed by a closer-than-predicted loss at heavily favored Pittsburgh, 27–16. Buffalo's third game and conference opener, versus Temple, was a back-and-forth contest that came down to the final play of the game. Keeping the game within seven points for the first three quarters, the Bulls first took the lead with 2:27 left in the fourth quarter, on a 25-yard field goal by A.J. Principe. Temple responded with a nine-play, 74-yard drive capped by an 11-yard touchdown catch by wide receiver Bruce Francis, his second score of the game, to take a 28–24 lead with only 38 seconds remaining. Taking over at their own 40-yard line after the kickoff went out of bounds, the Bulls drove down the field, scoring the game-winning touchdown on a 35-yard desperation heave from Drew Willy to wide receiver Naaman Roosevelt with no time remaining on the clock. Buffalo's record following the last-second win was 2–1, marking the first time since 1969 that the Bulls had a record over .500 beyond Week 1 as a Division I-A team. The last time the Bulls had started a season 2–1 was 1998, while they were still playing in Division I-AA.

The Bulls proceeded to lose their next three games. Buffalo was unable to keep up with No. 5-ranked Missouri, losing 42–21 in a game that Missouri saw as a tuneup for their later season. In the next contest, against MAC opponent Central Michigan, down nine points with under three minutes left Buffalo scored on a 65-yard pass to James Starks, recovered an onside kick to retain possession, and attempted a game-winning field goal—but A.J. Principe's 46-yard kick hit the right goalpost to give Central Michigan the victory. In the next game, against the Western Michigan Broncos, also in the MAC, Buffalo squandered a two-touchdown advantage with just over five minutes left, allowing the Broncos to win the game in overtime. Buffalo's overall record fell to 2–4, 1–2 in the MAC.

Bouncing back, Buffalo won their next five games. Against Army, Buffalo reversed the result of the Western Michigan game, coming back from a two-touchdown deficit to win in overtime. Handling conference opponents Ohio and Miami (Ohio) with relative ease, Buffalo continued conference play by beating Akron in a four-hour, four-overtime slugfest, 43–40, in Akron's final football game at the Rubber Bowl. In their next game, against Bowling Green, the Bulls found themselves down 21–0 midway through the third quarter, but still managed to come back for their third overtime win of the season. With the win, Buffalo clinched the MAC East championship and ensured that they would have their first winning regular season since moving to Division I-A; the final regular season game, a 24–21 loss to Kent State, was only a formality. The Bulls finished the regular season with an overall record of 7–5, 5–3 within the conference.

Buffalo's opponent in the 2008 MAC Championship Game would be the No. 12-ranked Ball State Cardinals, who had gone undefeated in winning the MAC West. Ball State was a two-touchdown favorite entering the game; Buffalo in its history was 0–5 against the Cardinals. The Bulls struck first with a touchdown late in the first quarter; Ball State responded with a touchdown and a field goal in the second quarter to take a 10–7 lead at the half. The two teams traded touchdowns early in the third quarter. Disaster then struck for Ball State: on two consecutive possessions late in the third quarter, after having driven into the red zone, the Cardinals fumbled the ball. Buffalo returned both of these fumbles for touchdowns and took a lead they would not surrender. The Bulls won the game 42–24, earning their first-ever MAC Championship as well as their first-ever win over a ranked opponent in nine attempts.

=== Connecticut ===
The Huskies entered 2008 seeking to prove their success the previous season was no fluke. In 2007, Connecticut earned their first Big East co-championship, albeit after losing to their fellow co-champion, West Virginia, 66–21. A loss to Wake Forest in the 2007 Meineke Car Care Bowl—the team's second bowl appearance all-time—gave the Huskies a final 2007 record of 9–4. In the Big East preseason media poll, UConn was picked to finish 6th overall in the conference.

UConn started the season strong, winning their first five games. The Huskies easily won their first game 35–3 against Division I-Football Championship Subdivision (Division I-FCS) opponent Hofstra. The second game, at Temple, was played as the remnants of Hurricane Hanna hit Philadelphia. UConn won 12–9 in overtime as Donald Brown ran for a then-career high 214 yards and scored the game-winning touchdown. Connecticut next avenged their loss to Virginia from 2007, winning the rematch 45–10. Baylor was next on the schedule; the Huskies pulled out the win in a back-and-forth game, 31–28. Connecticut opened Big East conference play in their next game against Louisville. The game was not decided until UConn linebacker Lawrence Wilson returned an interception for a touchdown with 2:45 left in the fourth quarter, giving the Huskies a 26–21 lead they would not relinquish. This was the second straight season where Connecticut won their first five games; before 2007, they had not opened a season so successfully since 1995, when they won their first six straight. Following the game, UConn achieved their first and only ranking of the year, appearing at No. 24 in the Associated Press (AP) and Harris polls and No. 23 in the Coaches' poll. However, starting quarterback Tyler Lorenzen broke his foot in the Louisville game; the Huskies would be forced to rely on backup Zach Frazer for the next few games.

The Huskies were unable to match their early success in the second half of the season, losing five of their next seven games. Everything went wrong for UConn in their game at North Carolina, as Frazer was intercepted three times and three Connecticut punts were blocked; North Carolina won in a blowout, 38–12. Against Big East rival Rutgers, UConn lost 12–10 as kicker Tony Ciaravino missed three field goals, including one with 1:09 left in the game that hit the right goalpost. The Huskies bounced back in their next game against eventual Big East champion Cincinnati, winning in a blowout 40–16. While not ranked in any of the polls, after the win Connecticut found itself No. 25 in the BCS standings. The Huskies would promptly give up that honor, losing to West Virginia 35–13 after leading 10–0 at the end of the first quarter and 13–7 at halftime. UConn would win the next week at Big East bottom-dweller Syracuse, 39–14, as Lorenzen returned from his injury. This would prove to be their last win of the regular season, as the Huskies finished with losses to South Florida (17–13) and No. 23-ranked Pittsburgh (34–10). Connecticut ended the regular season with a record of 7–5, 3–4 within the Big East conference.

== Pregame buildup ==
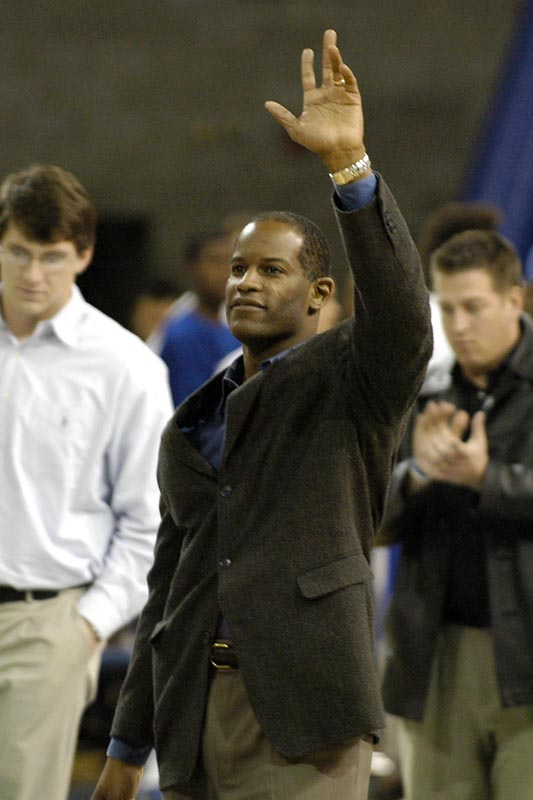
Buffalo Bulls head coach Turner Gill

In the weeks leading up to the game, media coverage focused on the achievements of the Buffalo Bulls. Buffalo had been one of the least successful programs in college football from their transition to Division I-A in 1999 to 2006, during which they had a cumulative record of 12–79. In 2008, the Bulls had their first winning season since 1996, won five games in a row for the first time since 1986, beat a ranked team for the first time in program history with their upset victory over Ball State in the MAC Championship Game, and would be making the first bowl appearance in school history. The turnaround of the Buffalo program brought acclaim to Bulls head coach Turner Gill, who had taken over the team in 2007.

Comparatively, Connecticut was an afterthought heading into the game. Pre-bowl coverage of UConn focused on NCAA rushing leader Donald Brown, who was considering foregoing his senior season to enter the 2009 NFL Draft. Brown indicated before the game that he had decided to return to UConn for the 2010 season.

=== Coaching change rumors ===
Following the regular season, speculation surrounded whether Turner Gill would leave Buffalo for another school's head coaching position. He was identified as a candidate at two schools: Syracuse and Auburn. In neither case was Gill hired; Syracuse opted for New Orleans Saints offensive coordinator Doug Marrone, while Auburn passed him over in favor of Iowa State head coach Gene Chizik, a move that prominent former National Basketball Association (NBA) player, Basketball Hall-of-Famer, and Auburn alumnus Charles Barkley claimed was due to racism. Gill ended up signing a contract extension with Buffalo.

UConn head coach Randy Edsall, who had been with the Huskies since 1999, was also rumored to be a candidate for the Syracuse job. Edsall, a Syracuse alumnus, denied any interest. Offensive coordinator Rob Ambrose accepted the head coaching position at Towson, his alma mater; he would stay to coach UConn during the bowl game, however.

=== Legacy of the 1958 Buffalo Bulls ===
While the 2009 International Bowl marked the first appearance of the Buffalo Bulls in a bowl game, it was not the first time the school had been invited to a bowl. Fifty years earlier, the 1958 Buffalo Bulls team finished with a record of 8–1. They were awarded the Lambert Cup, given to the best small college team in the eastern US, and received a bid to play in the 1958 Tangerine Bowl, where they would face Florida State. There was one catch: the team's African-American players—starting running back Willie Evans and backup defensive end Mike Wilson—would not be allowed to play. The Tangerine Bowl stadium was controlled by the Orlando High School Athletic Association, who prohibited integrated football games. University officials and the coaching staff decided to allow the team to vote on whether they would accept the bowl bid. Before secret ballots could be passed out, the players unanimously decided to reject the bid.

Surviving members of the 1958 Bulls team were invited to the 2009 International Bowl and were honored before the game. The Reverend Jesse Jackson spoke at the kickoff luncheon prior to the game, paying tribute to the legacy of the 1958 team.

=== Offensive matchups ===
==== Buffalo offense ====
Buffalo featured a high-powered, high-tempo, balanced offense that was good at not committing turnovers. During the regular season the Bulls averaged 380.5 offensive yards per game, 45th best in the nation, and scored an average of 31.3 points per game, 31st best. Buffalo's turnover margin was 6th best in the nation, at +1.15.

The Bulls were led offensively by the triple threat of quarterback Drew Willy, running back James Starks, and wide receiver Naaman Roosevelt. The three combined to break 14 single-season school records, including most points scored in a season (404). Willy, heading into his final game as a Buffalo Bull, had already surpassed the 3,000-yard mark in passing on the season, throwing for 25 touchdowns against only five interceptions. Starks, while not seen as the same caliber of player as UConn's Donald Brown, had run for over 1,300 yards and caught 41 passes for 340 yards, scoring 16 touchdowns on the year. Roosevelt was seen as the top playmaker, going over the 100-yard mark in each of Buffalo's last five games and scoring at least once in his last seven.

==== Connecticut offense ====
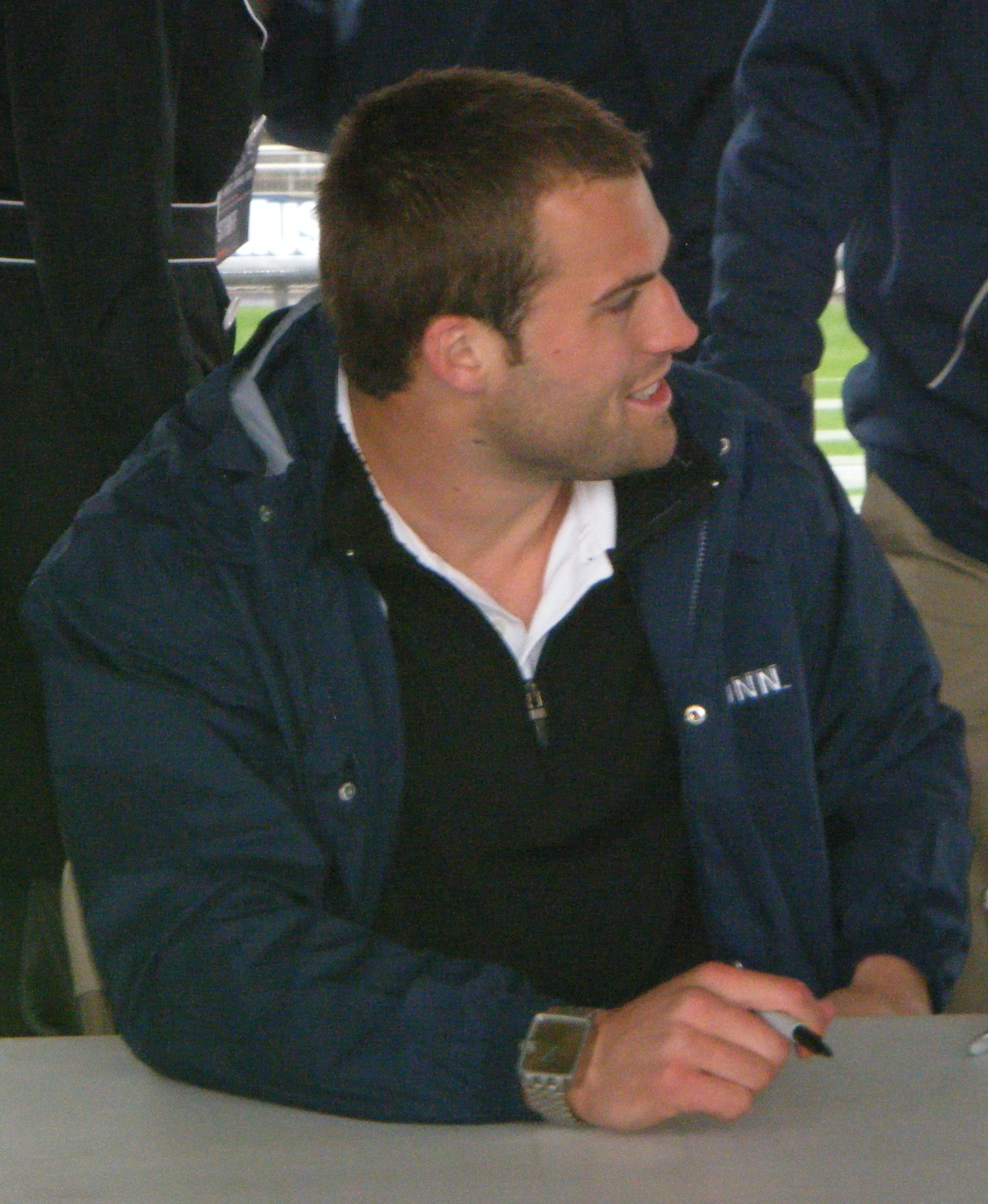
Despite missing time during the season with a foot injury, quarterback Tyler Lorenzen would start for UConn in the 2009 International Bowl.

Especially compared to Buffalo, the UConn offense was extremely unbalanced; the Huskies ranked 19th in the nation in running, averaging 204.6 yards per game, but only 106th in the nation in passing, averaging 147.3 yards per game. Connecticut's offense was centered around running back Donald Brown. Described as "the ultimate workhorse", Brown led the NCAA in rushing going into the game with 1,822 yards. He had already tied the school single-season rushing touchdown record with 17 scores. His dominant performance led to him being named the Big East offensive player of the year as well as an All-American by multiple organizations. Somewhat surprisingly, he was not a finalist for the Doak Walker Award, annually given to the best running back in college football; the award was eventually won by Shonn Greene of Iowa. UConn's rushing attack was supplemented by the efforts of quarterback Tyler Lorenzen and running back Jordan Todman.

The Huskies struggled to pass the ball all season, only completing four touchdown passes as a team heading into the International Bowl. Lorenzen completed under half of his passing attempts on the season. He threw for 820 yards with more interceptions (eight) than touchdowns (two). Nevertheless, before the game Randy Edsall confirmed that Lorenzen would be the starting quarterback for UConn in the International Bowl. This would be his ninth appearance at quarterback on the season; he missed four games with a broken right foot.

=== Defensive matchups ===
==== Buffalo defense ====
The Buffalo defense was described as "among the worst in the MAC, meaning it's among the worst in college football". In Division I-FBS, the Bulls ranked 84th in total defense, allowing an average of 408 yards per game. Buffalo's run defense was 83rd in the country, allowing 141.1 yards per game; their pass defense was ranked 97th, allowing almost 250 yards per game. The Bulls allowed other teams to score an average of 27 points against them per game, which ranked 73rd in the country.

Buffalo did have one strength on defense: forcing turnovers. The Bulls recovered 20 fumbles and caught eight interceptions on the year. Buffalo's turnover margin of +1.15 was 6th best in the nation.

==== Connecticut defense ====
Conversely, UConn boasted one of the better defenses in the country. The Huskies allowed the 10th-fewest yards per game in the nation with 281 yards allowed. Connecticut was especially good against the pass; they allowed an average of only 165 yards per game, seventh-best in the country. No UConn opponent passed for more than 259 yards during the regular season.

The Huskies had several standout players on defense. One was defensive end Cody Brown, who led UConn with 14 tackles for a loss (TFL) and nine sacks while also being named to the All-Big East first team. Cornerback Jasper Howard was another standout player: he had 37 tackles and four interceptions on the year while also leading the Big East in punt returns.

== Starting lineups ==
Buffalo	Position	Connecticut
Offense
Naaman Roosevelt	WR	Brad Kanuch
Ray Norell	LT	Will Beatty
Peter Bittner	LG	Moe Petrus
Chris Lauzze	C	Keith Gray
Jeff Niedermier	RG	Zach Hurd
Andrew West	RT	Mike Hicks
Jesse Rack	TE	Steve Brouse
Ernest Jackson	WR	Kashif Moore
Drew Willy	QB	Tyler Lorenzen
James Starks	RB	Donald Brown
Lawrence Rolle	FB	Anthony Sherman
Defense
Andrae Smith	LE	Julius Williams
Ronald Hilaire	LDT	Kendall Reyes
Anel Montanez	RDT	Twyon Martin
Jerry Housey	RE	Cody Brown
Raphael Akobundu	SLB	Scott Lutrus
Tom Drewes	MLB	Greg Lloyd
Justin Winters	WLB	Lawrence Wilson
Domonic Cook	LCB	Robert McClain
Kendrick Hawkins	RCB	Jasper Howard
Davonte Shannon	SS	Dahna Deleston
Mike Newton	FS	Robert Vaughn

== Game summary ==
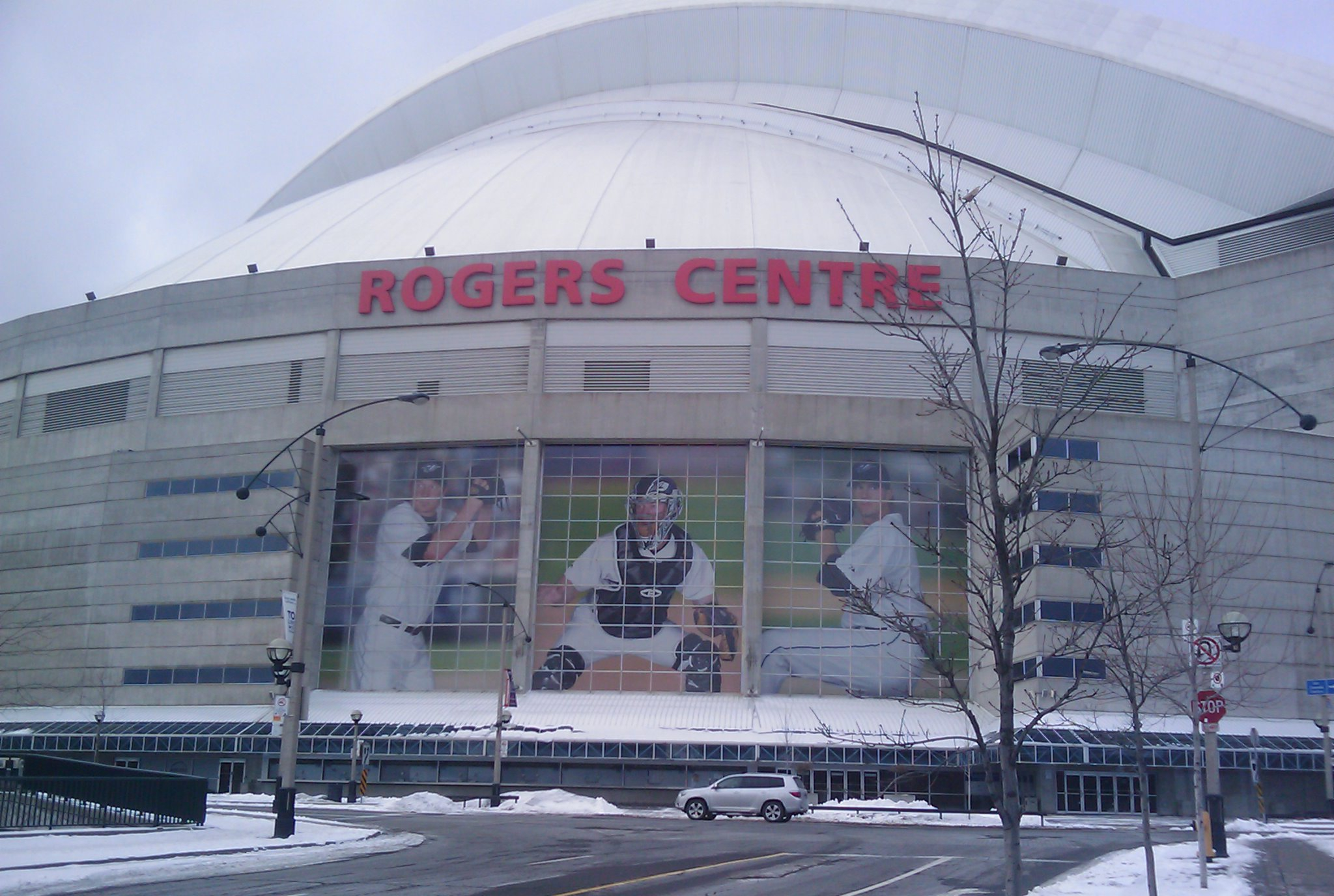
Rogers Centre was the site of the 2009 International Bowl.

The 2009 International Bowl kicked off on January 3, 2009, at 12:00 p.m. in Toronto, Ontario, Canada. Official attendance was listed at 40,184, the highest in the history of the International Bowl. The attendance record was largely due to Buffalo fans; an estimated 30,000 attended the game. John Saunders, Jesse Palmer, and Doug Flutie, all with ties to Canada, were the announcers for the television broadcast, which aired on ESPN2. The game was watched by over 2 million households with a rating of 2.12, both the highest in International Bowl history. Prior to the game, spread bettors favored Connecticut to win by four and a half points.

=== First quarter ===
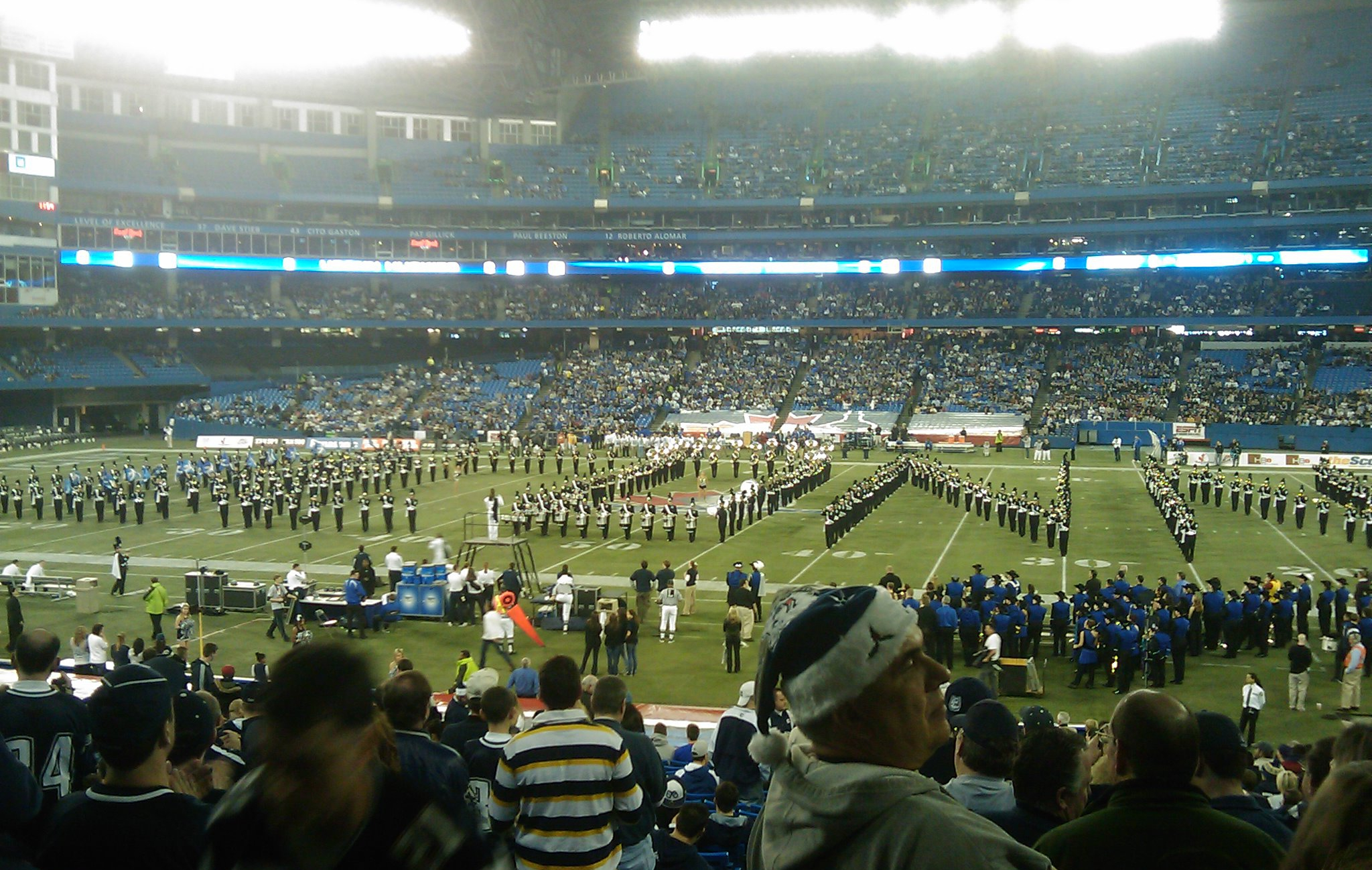
The University of Connecticut marching band performing prior to kickoff

Buffalo received the ball first to begin the game, and returned the opening kickoff to their own 24-yard line. They were unable to move the ball in three plays, and punted the ball to Connecticut. The Huskies took possession on their own 18-yard line and drove down the field with alternating rushes by running back Donald Brown and quarterback Tyler Lorenzen, earning two first downs. On 2nd down and 5 from the UConn 49-yard line, Lorenzen was sacked by Buffalo's Sherrod Lott and fumbled; the ball was recovered by UConn right tackle Mike Hicks, allowing the Huskies to retain possession. A holding penalty on the next play called on UConn left tackle William Beatty set up 3rd-and-24. Donald Brown rushed for fifteen yards but was unable to reach the first-down marker, forcing UConn to punt.

Buffalo took over at their own 19-yard line and promptly earned their 1st first down of the game on a 10-yard pass from quarterback Drew Willy to wide receiver Naaman Roosevelt. The Bulls' drive stalled from there, forcing them to punt. The punt struck the ground and hit UConn's Jonathan Jean-Louis, who was attempting to block for the punt return; Buffalo recovered the loose ball, giving them back possession at the Connecticut 23-yard line. The Bulls were unable to move the ball any closer to the end zone, and settled for a 38-yard field goal by kicker A. J. Principe, giving them a 3–0 lead with 4:26 remaining in the first quarter.

The ensuing kickoff was returned by UConn running back Jordan Todman 45 yards to the Buffalo 45-yard line. On the first play from scrimmage, Donald Brown broke through the Buffalo defense and ran the length of the field for the first touchdown of the day. UConn kicker Dave Teggart's extra point attempt was good, giving UConn their first lead of the day, at 7–3.

Buffalo got the ball back at their own 21-yard line and were only able to advance it to their 34-yard line before punting the ball back to Connecticut. UConn cornerback Jasper Howard returned the ball 26 yards to the Bulls' 41-yard line. The Huskies handed the ball to Donald Brown for five straight running plays, advancing the ball to the Buffalo 19-yard line as the first quarter clock expired. At the end of the first quarter, UConn held a 7–3 lead and looked to be in position to score more when the second quarter began.

=== Second quarter ===
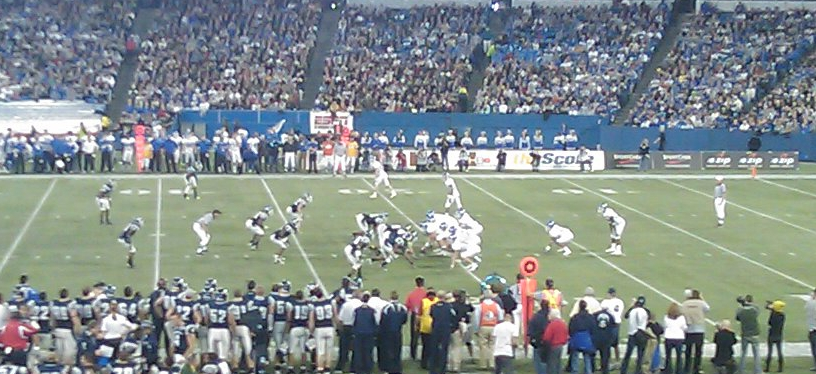
Buffalo on offense on the 21-yard line

UConn began the second quarter by having Tyler Lorenzen rush the ball for four yards. On 3rd and 7, Lorenzen attempted his first pass of the game, which was behind Husky wide receiver Michael Smith. Dave Teggart kicked a 32-yard field goal to increase Connecticut's lead to 10–3.

The Bulls began their next drive at their own 26-yard line, but went three-and-out. Buffalo punter Peter Fardon kicked the ball over the head of UConn returner Jasper Howard; rather than let the ball go, he ran backwards chasing after it. Trying to grab the ball over his shoulder, he muffed the catch, and the ball bounced into the end zone, where it was recovered by Buffalo's Ray Anthony Long for a Bull touchdown. The special-teams miscue by Howard allowed Buffalo to tie the game at 10–10 with 11:36 remaining in the second quarter.

UConn's turnover woes continued on their next possession when, on their second play from scrimmage after receiving Buffalo's kickoff, Tyler Lorenzen was sacked, causing him to fumble the ball. The Bulls recovered and drove down the field to the UConn 12-yard line where they were stopped. Principe kicked a 29-yard field goal giving Buffalo back the lead, at 13–10.

The ensuing kickoff saw yet another Connecticut special-teams blunder. UConn running back Robbie Frey misplayed the ball off of the kickoff, letting it roll back into the end zone. Frey recovered the loose ball; if he had simply taken a knee, by rule it would have been a touchback and the Huskies would have gotten the ball at their own 20-yard line. Instead, Frey carried the ball out of the end zone, was hit at the 4-yard line, and fumbled. Buffalo recovered and promptly scored on a 4-yard touchdown run by Bull running back James Starks, giving themselves a 20–10 lead. UConn had committed its fifth fumble of the game, four of which were recovered by Buffalo. All of Buffalo's 20 points were directly off of UConn turnovers.

Connecticut fumbled the ball for the sixth time on the next possession; this time Donald Brown was responsible for dropping the ball. Buffalo recovered for the fifth time, but was unable to score, punting to ball back to UConn with 4:37 left in the half. Brown made up for his earlier mistake by breaking off a 75-yard run before being caught from behind. On the next play Tyler Lorenzen ran the ball into the end zone from 13 yards out. Neither team scored for the remainder of the first half, making the score 20–17 Buffalo going into halftime.

=== Third quarter ===
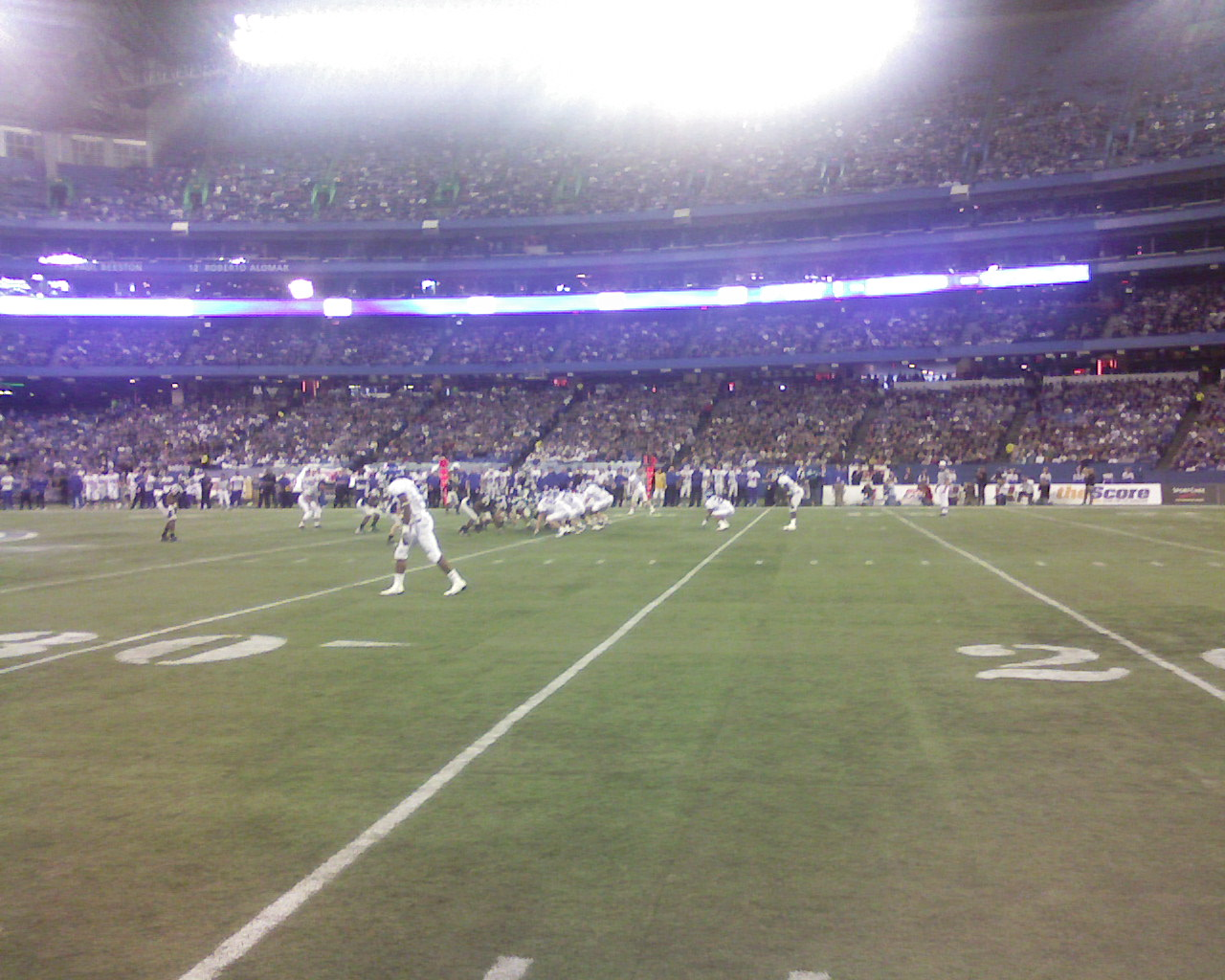
Connecticut versus Buffalo

Connecticut received the ball to start the third quarter and drove down the field on rushing plays by Donald Brown, Jordan Todman and Tyler Lorenzen, before the drive stalled at the Buffalo 36-yard line. UConn punter Desi Cullen's punt was downed at the Buffalo 1-yard line, pinning them against their own end zone. The Bulls were unable to move the ball, punting the ball back to UConn after three plays. Starting from their own 44-yard line, the Huskies drove to within the Buffalo 10-yard line; an offside penalty on Buffalo's Jerry Housey gave UConn a 1st-and-goal at the Buffalo 4-yard line. Connecticut used a play-action pass, only their second pass attempt of the game, to fool the Bulls; UConn tight end Steve Brouse was wide open in the end zone, catching the ball for the touchdown and giving Connecticut back the lead at 24–20 with 5:22 left in the third quarter.

Buffalo received the ball off the kickoff on their own 28-yard line. Losing eight yards on their three plays, Buffalo once again punted the ball to Connecticut. UConn drove to the Buffalo 25-yard line and attempted a 42-yard field goal; the kick by Dave Teggart was blocked. Buffalo got the ball back with less than a minute left in the quarter and completed two passes, moving the ball 13 yards down the field before the quarter expired. The score remained in Connecticut's favor, 24–20.

=== Fourth quarter ===
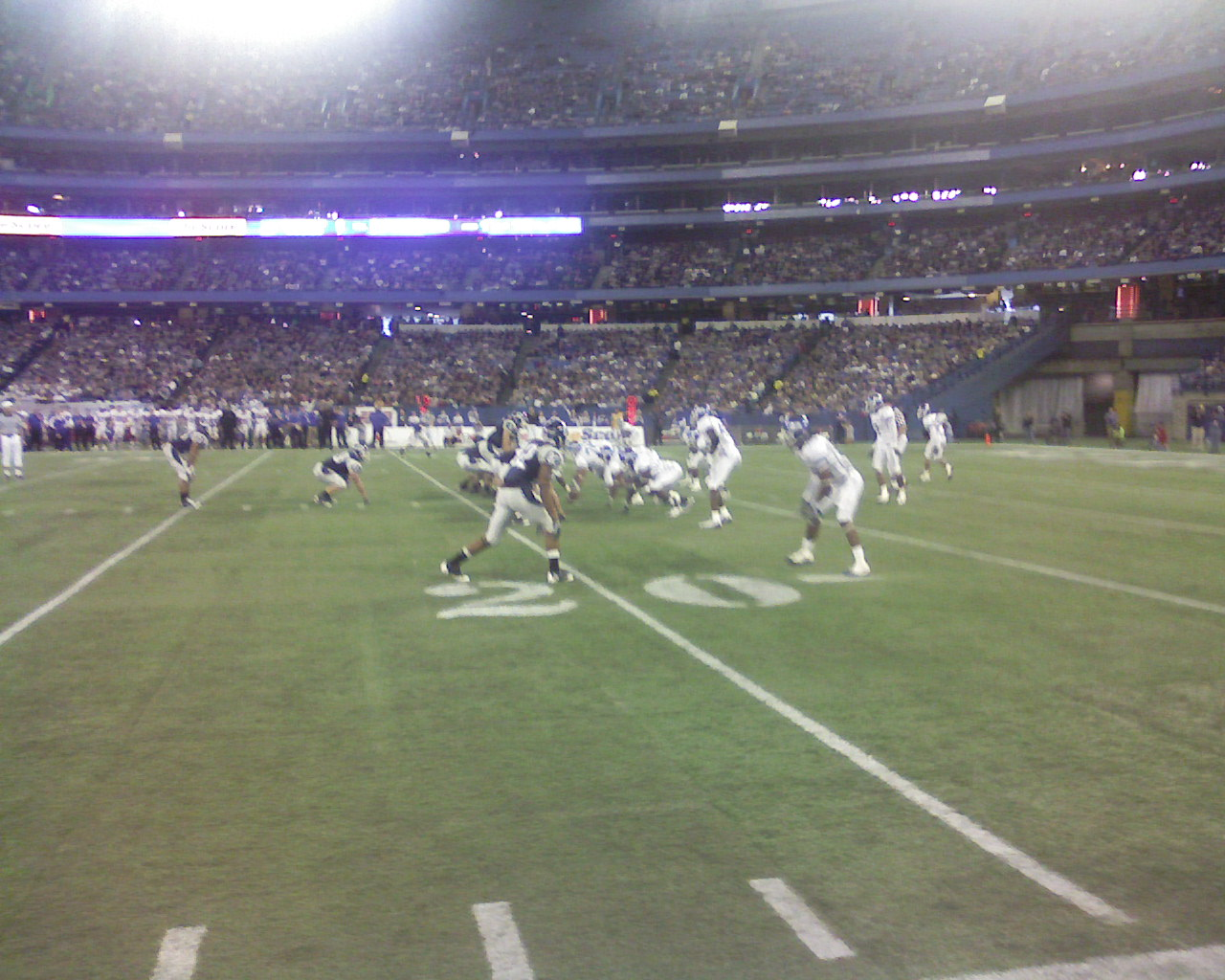
Huskies in blue versus Bulls in white

Buffalo began the final quarter with the ball in a 2nd-and-11 situation and were unable to convert the first down. UConn received Buffalo's punt and were also unable to move the ball, going three-and-out and punting back to the Bulls. On their next possession Buffalo managed to get a first down off of a Drew Willy pass to tight end Jesse Rack, but were unable to move the ball further than UConn's 49-yard line and punted again.

Connecticut took over at their own 32-yard line and, after throwing only two passes in the first three quarters, completed three passes over 10 yards apiece to move down the field. On a 2nd-and-5 from the Buffalo 15-yard line, Tyler Lorenzen scored his second rushing touchdown of the game. UConn's lead was extended to 31–20 with less than five minutes left in the game.

Receiving the ball at their own 8-yard line following a penalty on the kickoff return, Buffalo began to move down the field, with Drew Willy completing a 38-yard pass to wideout Brett Hamlin and a 29-yard pass to Naaman Roosevelt. On 3rd-and-4 from the Connecticut 19-yard line, Willy completed a ten-yard pass to James Starks, giving the Bulls a 1st-and-goal. Starks rushed for four yards on first down; on second down, Willy threw an incomplete pass intended for Roosevelt. On 3rd-and-goal from the Husky 5-yard line, Willy attempted a pass that was deflected and intercepted by UConn safety Dahna Deleston, who returned the ball 100 yards for the game-sealing touchdown. UConn won the game 38–20.

=== Scoring summary ===
Scoring summary

Quarter	Time	Drive			Team	Scoring information	Score	
Quarter	Time	Plays	Yards	TOP	Team	Scoring information	UB	UCONN
1	04:26	4	3	1:36	UB	38-yard field goal by A. J. Principe	3	0
1	04:07	1	45	0:09	UCONN	Donald Brown 45-yard touchdown run, Dave Teggart kick good	3	7
2	14:11	8	26	3:13	UCONN	32-yard field goal by Dave Teggart	3	10
2	11:36	0	0	0:00	UB	Ray Anthony Long fumble recovery in end zone, A. J. Principe kick good	10	10
2	08:22	5	17	2:53	UB	29-yard field goal by A. J. Principe	13	10
2	07:55	1	4	0:13	UB	James Starks 4-yard touchdown run, A. J. Principe kick good	20	10
2	04:01	2	88	0:36	UCONN	Tyler Lorenzen 13-yard touchdown run, Dave Teggart kick good	20	17
3	05:22	7	56	3:25	UCONN	Steve Brouse 4-yard touchdown reception from Tyler Lorenzen, Dave Teggart kick good	20	24
4	04:44	9	68	4:48	UCONN	Tyler Lorenzen 11-yard touchdown run, Dave Teggart kick good	20	31
4	02:15	0	0	0:00	UCONN	Dahna Deleston 100-yard interception return, Dave Teggart kick good	20	38
"TOP" = time of possession. For other American football terms, see Glossary of American football.							20	38

== Final statistics ==
Statistical comparison
	UB	UConn
1st downs	10	19
Total yards	237	407
Passing yards	213	49
Rushing yards	24	358
Penalties	5–25	3–29
3rd down conversions	2–17	4–9
4th down conversions	1–1	0–0
Turnovers	1	5
Time of possession	33:06	26:54

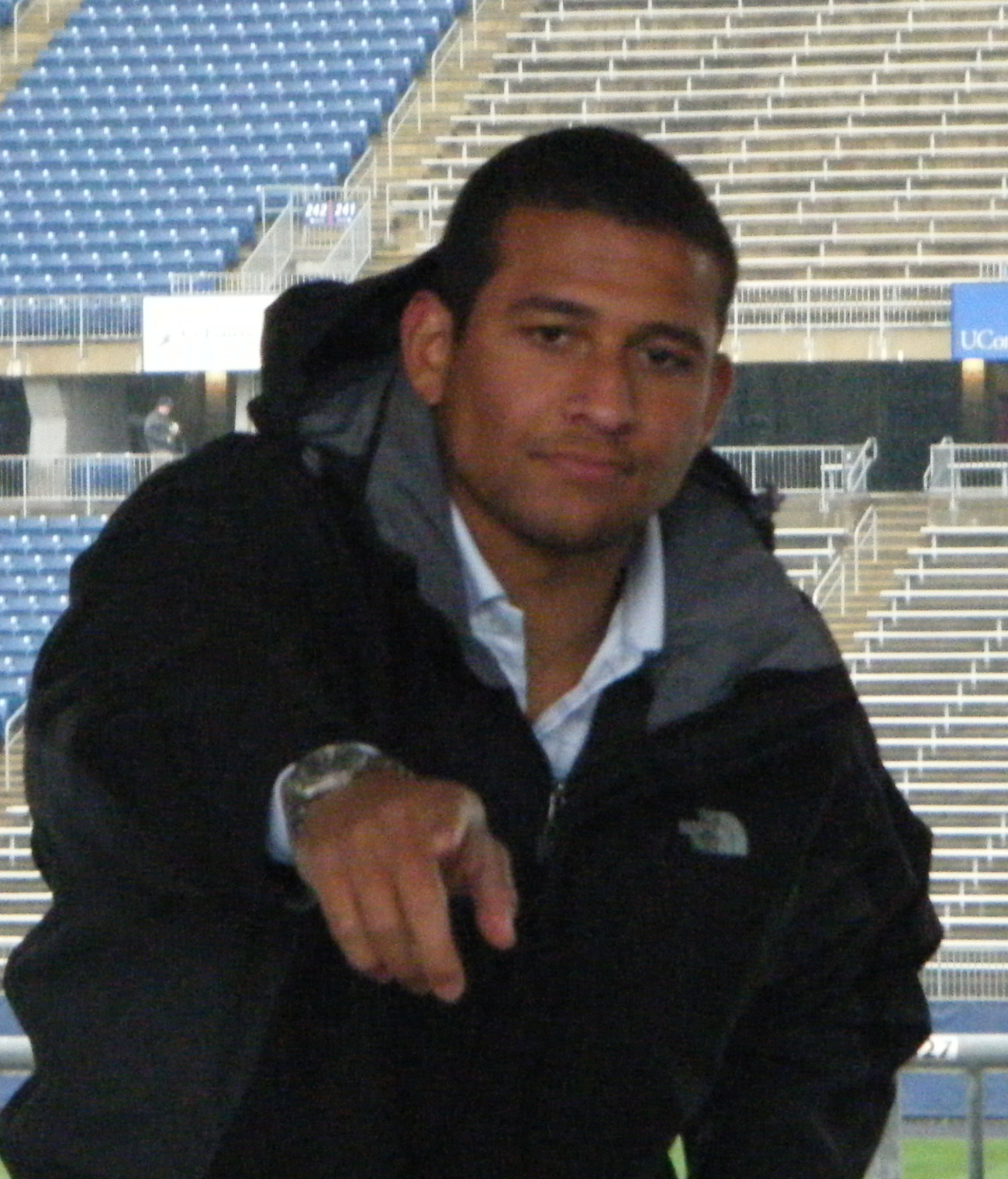
2009 International Bowl MVP Donald Brown

For his performance in the 2009 International Bowl, Connecticut running back Donald Brown was named the player of the game. Brown rushed for 261 yards and one touchdown on 29 attempts. He finished the 2008 college football season with 2,083 rushing yards, which led the nation. Brown set several new UConn school records, including the single-season records for rushing yards (2,083), attempts (367), and yards per game (160.2), the career records for rushing yards (3,800) and attempts (698), and the record for consecutive games with at least 100 yards rushing (8). His performance did not break the International Bowl rushing record, however; the previous year Rutgers running back Ray Rice ran for 280 yards and four touchdowns.

Brown's dominant rushing performance was supplemented by RB Jordan Todman's 62 yards on seven attempts, QB Tyler Lorenzen's 32 yards on twelve attempts, including two touchdowns, and fullback Anthony Sherman's three yards on one attempt; in total Connecticut ran for 358 yards. The Huskies attempted to pass only six times during the game; Lorenzen completed four of them for 49 yards and a touchdown. Four different UConn receivers caught one pass each: wide receiver Kashif Moore (18 yards), cornerback and sometime wide receiver Darius Butler (16 yards), fullback Anthony Sherman (11 yards), and tight end Steve Brouse (4 yards and a touchdown).

Buffalo's offensive performance was in some ways the opposite of Connecticut's: while UConn dominated on the ground and barely passed the ball, Buffalo struggled with the run but had a good day passing. The Bulls ran for a total of 24 yards on the game; James Starks accounted for 25 yards on thirteen carries and scored a touchdown, while RB Brandon Termilus ran three times for five yards. Their total was partially offset by Drew Willy, who lost six yards on three rushing attempts. Willy had a much more successful day passing, completing 29 out of 43 passes for 213 yards and one interception. Namaan Roosevelt led the Buffalo receivers with 90 yards on eight catches; of the five other Bulls who received passes, WR Brett Hamlin caught four passes for 54 yards, TE Jesse Rack caught three for 22 yards, RB Starks caught 11 for 21 yards, WR Ernest Jackson caught two for 17 yards, and WR Gary Rice caught one for 9 yards.

Connecticut dominated Buffalo statistically in the first half, gaining 225 yards to the Bulls' 94, led by Donald Brown's 208 yards rushing. Buffalo won the turnover battle however, recovering five UConn fumbles. The Bulls scored 20 points off UConn turnovers in the first half, but were held scoreless in the second half when the Huskies stopped turning the ball over.

== Aftermath ==
Connecticut's win gave the team a final record of 8–5 and back-to-back winning seasons for the first time since 2003–04. Buffalo's final record fell to 8–6, which still marked the first winning season for the Bulls since transitioning to Division I-A football in 1999.

In a press conference after the game, Brown announced that he would not return for his senior season and enter the NFL Draft, saying he told the media he said he was staying to take the focus off of himself prior to the game. Brown was drafted 27th overall by the Indianapolis Colts, becoming the first UConn player ever drafted in the first round. Three other UConn players were drafted in the second round: Darius Butler 41st overall by the New England Patriots, Will Beatty 60th overall by the New York Giants, and defensive end Cody Brown 63rd overall by the Arizona Cardinals. Tight end Martin Bédard was drafted 15th overall in the second round of the Canadian Football League's (CFL) 2009 Draft. Buffalo did not have any players drafted by either league in 2009; in the 2010 NFL draft James Starks was selected in the sixth round, 193rd overall, by the Green Bay Packers. UConn cornerback Robert McClain was also drafted by the NFL in 2010, in the seventh round, 249th overall, by the Carolina Panthers. (Note: Connecticut WR Marcus Easley was also drafted in 2010, by the Buffalo Bills in the 4th round. He is intentionally not listed because he did not play in the 2009 International Bowl.)

In the offseason Connecticut hired Joe Moorhead as their new offensive coordinator, replacing the departed Rob Ambrose. Turner Gill returned to coach Buffalo in 2009. Following that season, however, he left to take over the football program at the University of Kansas.

Connecticut and Buffalo resumed their rivalry on September 25, 2010, playing a regular season game at UConn's Rentschler Field. Although the score was tied 14–14 at halftime, the Huskies pulled away in the second half after changing quarterbacks, winning the rematch 45–21.

== See also ==
- National Football League in Toronto – the Bulls were the second football team from Buffalo to play in Rogers Centre in as many months. On December 7, 2008, the city's NFL team, the Bills, played a "home" game there against the Miami Dolphins.
- Glossary of American football
- American football positions
