= 2007 International Bowl =

- Inaugural Bowl Game
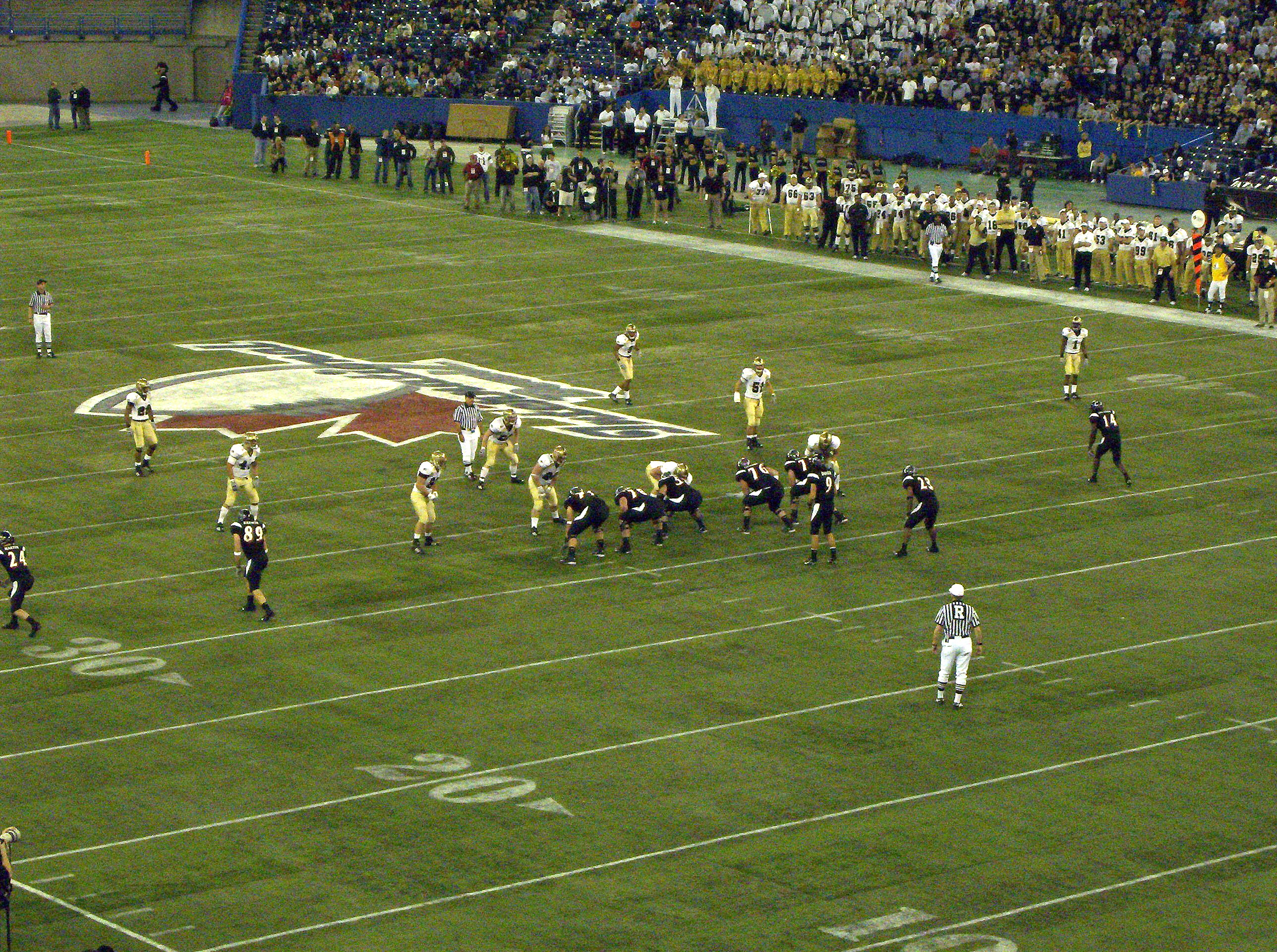
Western Michigan Broncos	Cincinnati Bearcats
(8–5)	(8–5)
24	27
Head coach: Bill Cubit	Head coach: Brian Kelly
	1	2	3	4	Total
Western Michigan	0	17	0	7	24
Cincinnati	14	10	0	3	27
- Date: January 6, 2007
- Season: 2006
- Stadium: Rogers Centre
- Location: Toronto, Ontario, Canada
- MVP: Cincinnati WR Dominick Goodman
- Referee: Dan Capron (Big Ten)
- Attendance: 26,717

United States TV coverage
- Network: ESPN2
- Announcers: John Saunders (Play by Play); Doug Flutie (Analyst); Craig James (Analyst); Todd Harris (Sideline)

International TV coverage
- Network: TSN (Canada)

The 2007 International Bowl, held on January 6, 2007, at Rogers Centre in Toronto, Ontario, Canada, was one of the college American football bowl games that ended the 2006 NCAA Division I FBS football season. The game pitted the University of Cincinnati against Western Michigan University.

International Bowl logo

== Background ==
It was historically notable for several reasons:

- It was the first edition of the International Bowl.
- It was the first significant football game held in Canada under American football rules since 2001, which was the last season in which Simon Fraser University's football team participated in the U.S.-based National Association of Intercollegiate Athletics under American rules. Starting in 2002, Simon Fraser moved its football program to Canadian Interuniversity Sport and began playing under Canadian rules.
- It was the first major college (American) football game played outside the United States since 1996, when Notre Dame and Navy played their annual regular-season game at Croke Park in Dublin, Ireland.
- It was the first postseason bowl game (in American football) to be played outside the U.S. since the final Bacardi Bowl was played in Havana, Cuba in 1937.
- It also made coach Brian Kelly the first coach ever to beat the same team twice in a season with different teams.

Besides the historic significance of the game itself, the UC–WMU matchup was of particular interest because newly hired Cincinnati head coach Brian Kelly coached Central Michigan University during the 2006 regular season. Kelly and Central Michigan, the main rival of WMU, defeated Western Michigan 31–7 just eight weeks earlier. In addition, both schools had been charter members of the Mid-American Conference (WMU is still in the conference today, but UC left after the 1952–53 academic year).

== Game summary ==
The game drew a crowd of 26,717. In this game, Cincinnati jumped out to a 24–0 lead with 10:22 left in the first half, but Western Michigan was able to score 24 unanswered points to tie the game at 24 early in the fourth quarter. The Bearcats defeated the Broncos 27–24 with WMU missing a late 51-yard field goal that could have sent the game into overtime.

== Broadcast ==
The on-air ESPN crew included John Saunders, who was born and raised in Toronto and graduated from WMU; and Doug Flutie, who played two seasons with the Toronto Argonauts, both of which ended in Grey Cup championships.
