= Tyler Lorenzen =

American football player (born 1985)

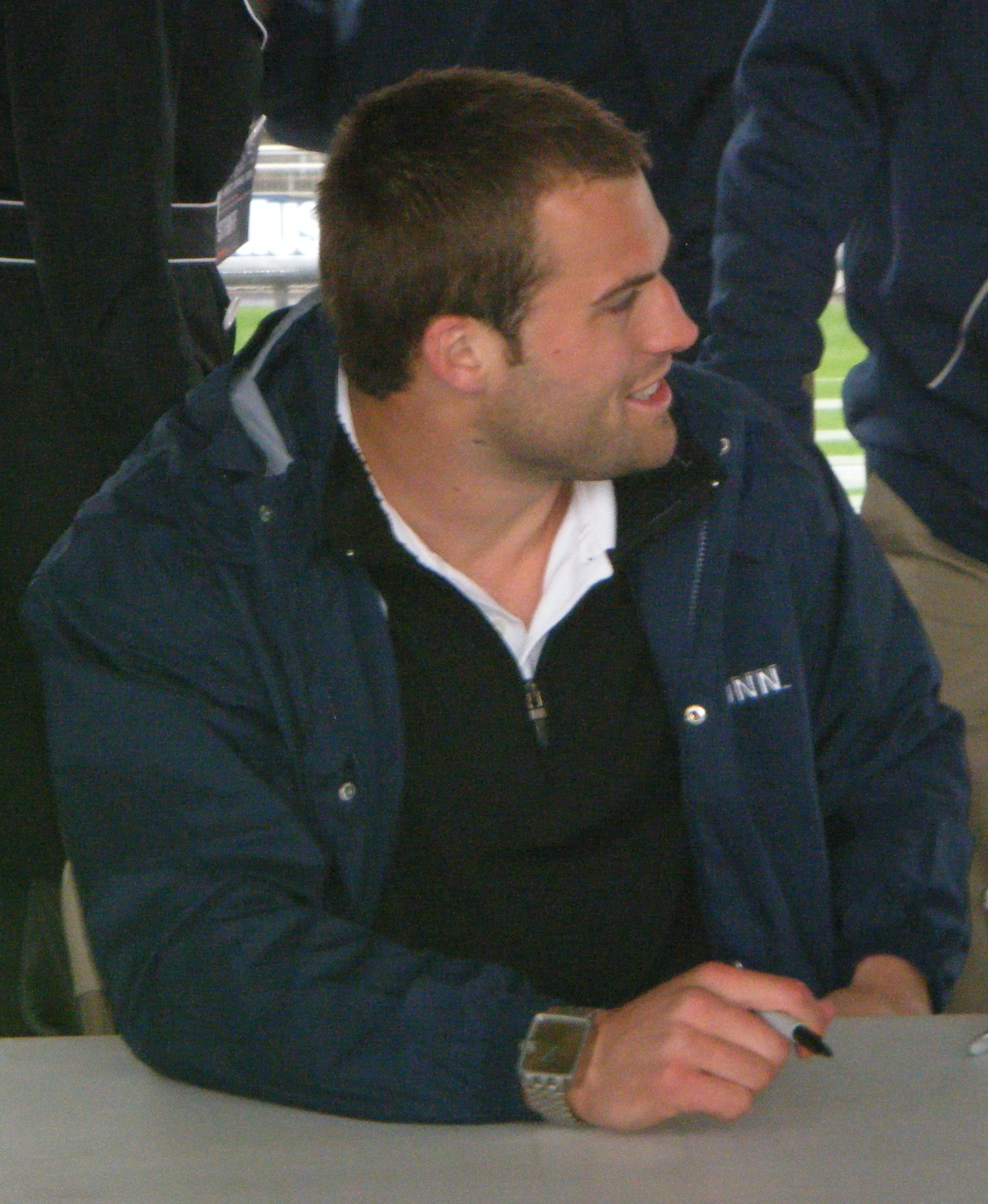
- Lorenzen signing autographs at the 2010 UConn spring game at Rentschler Field

No. 82
- Position: Tight end

Personal information
- Born: December 24, 1985 (age 40); Fremont, Iowa, U.S.
- Listed height: 6 ft 5 in (1.96 m)
- Listed weight: 235 lb (107 kg)

Career information
- High school: Eddyville-Blakesburg (IA)
- College: Connecticut
- NFL draft: 2009: undrafted

Career history
- Jacksonville Jaguars (2009)*; New Orleans Saints (2009–2011)*
- * Offseason or practice squad member only

Awards and highlights
- Super Bowl champion (XLIV)
- Stats at Pro Football Reference

Tyler John Lorenzen (born December 24, 1985) is an American former professional football player who was a tight end in the National Football League (NFL). He played college football for the Connecticut Huskies and was signed by the Jacksonville Jaguars as an undrafted free agent in 2009. He also played for the New Orleans Saints.

Lorenzen became the CEO of Puris Proteins, a pea protein producer based in Minneapolis.

== Early life ==
Lorenzen attended Eddyville-Blakesburg High School, where he led the football team to two state playoff appearances.

== Junior college career ==
Previous to playing at the University of Connecticut, Lorenzen played a season at Palomar College in San Marcos, California. Following his season at Palomar, he was rated the No. 2 junior college quarterback prospect in the nation for the class of 2007 by JCGridiron.com.

== College career ==
Lorenzen played college football for the Connecticut Huskies, where he was a quarterback and started 21 games in two seasons for the Huskies.

== Professional career ==
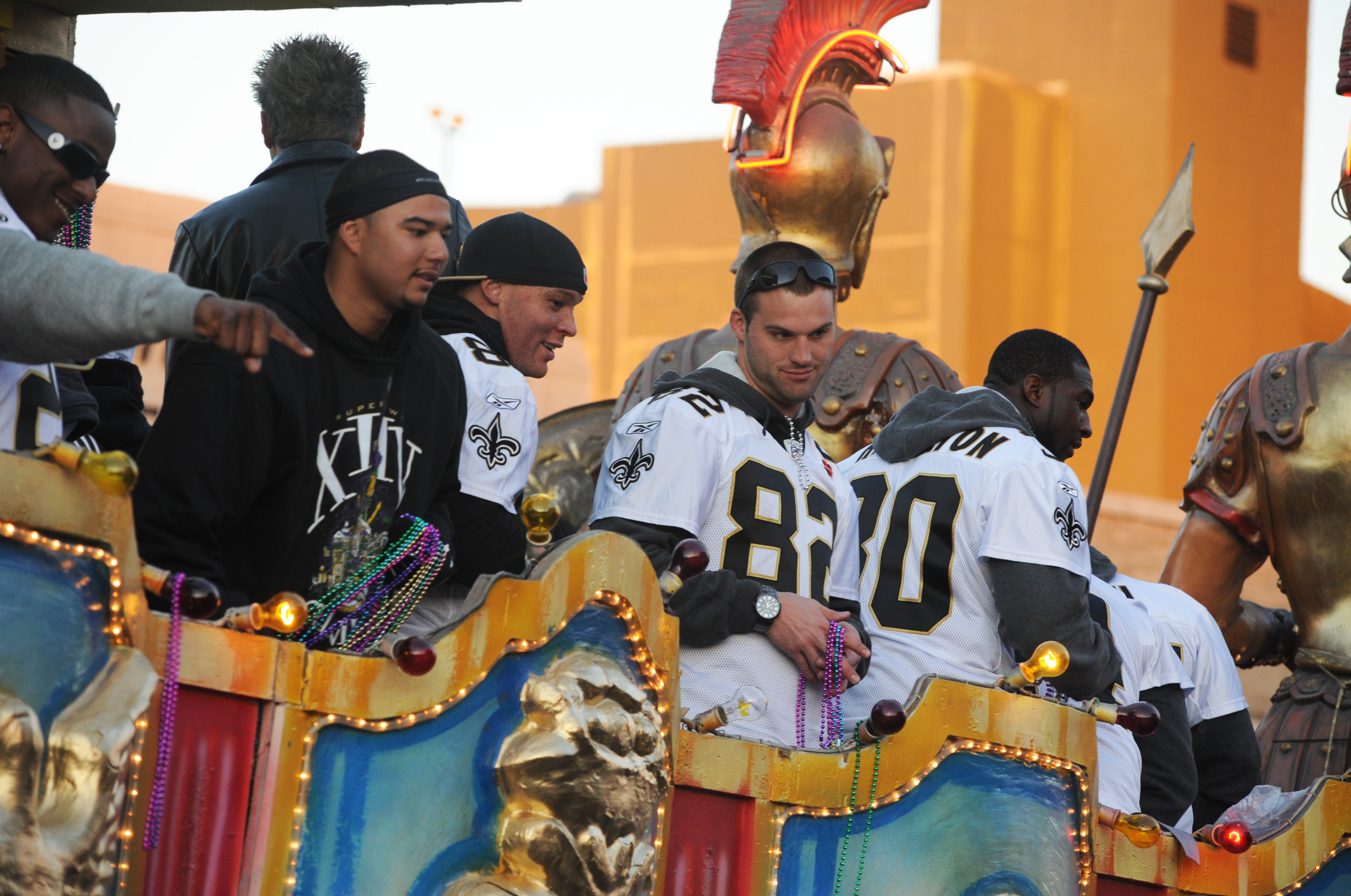
Lorenzen (82) at the 2010 Saints Super Bowl victory parade

Although he played quarterback in college, Lorenzen converted to tight end as a pro. After first signing with Jacksonville in April 2009, he moved to the Saints practice squad in September and was with the team for its Super Bowl winning 2009 season. Cut by the Saints in September 2010, he spent several months working in his family's soybean genetics business before the Saints re-signed him in December.
