= 2008 International Bowl =

- Bowl Game
- International Bowl logo.
Rutgers Scarlet Knights	Ball State Cardinals
(7–5)	(7–5)
52	30
Head coach: Greg Schiano	Head coach: Brady Hoke
	1	2	3	4	Total
Rutgers	14	10	14	14	52
Ball State	3	6	7	14	30
- Date: January 5, 2008
- Season: 2007
- Stadium: Rogers Centre
- Location: Toronto, Ontario
- MVP: Rutgers RB Ray Rice
- Favorite: Rutgers by 10
- Referee: Gil Gelbke (C-USA)
- Attendance: 31,455
- Payout: US$750,000 per team

United States TV coverage
- Network: ESPN2
- Announcers: John Saunders (Play by Play); Doug Flutie (Analyst); Jesse Palmer (Analyst); Stacey Dales (Sideline)

International TV coverage
- Network: Rogers Sportsnet (Canada)

The 2008 International Bowl was played on January 5, 2008, at the Rogers Centre in Toronto, Ontario, Canada. The game featured the Scarlet Knights of Rutgers University—who finished 5th in the Big East Conference—and the Cardinals of Ball State University—who finished co-champions of the Mid-American Conference's West Division. The game was the only NCAA Division I Football Bowl Subdivision game from the 2007–2008 season to be played outside the United States. Rutgers won by a score of 52–30.

== Overview ==
The game featured tie-ins from the Big East and Mid-American Conferences (MAC). Representing the Big East was Rutgers, who finished the 2007 regular season with an overall record of 7–5 (3–4 in the Big East). Representing the MAC was Ball State, who finished the 2007 regular season with an overall record of 7–5 (5–2 in the MAC).

Announcers for the American TV coverage on ESPN2, John Saunders (Toronto) and Jesse Palmer (Ottawa), and sideline reporter Stacey Dales (Collingwood) are all Canadians. Additionally, Doug Flutie played in the CFL.
