= Donald Brown (running back) =

American football player (born 1987)

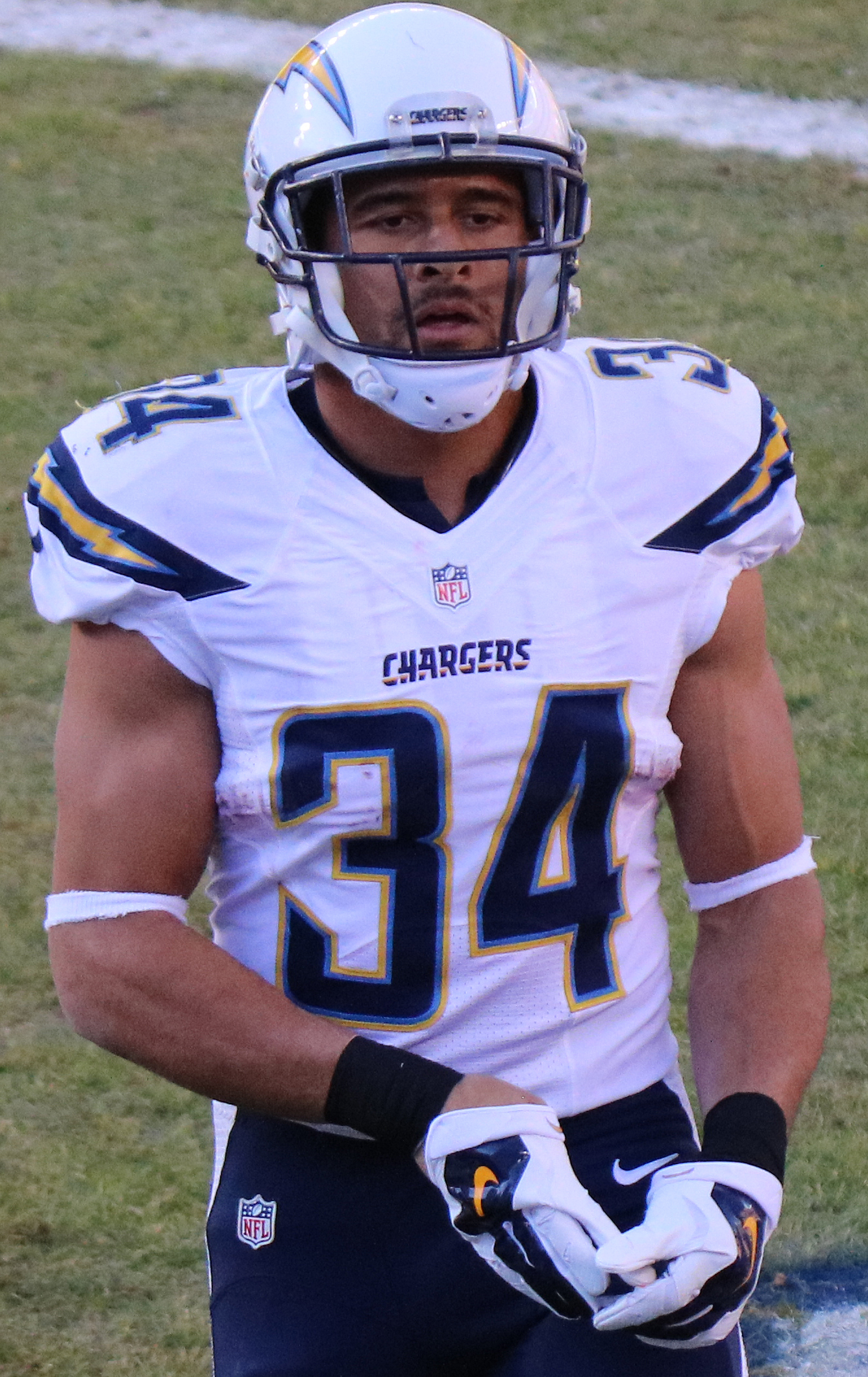
- Brown with the San Diego Chargers in 2015

No. 31, 34
- Position: Running back

Personal information
- Born: April 11, 1987 (age 39); Atlantic Highlands, New Jersey, U.S.
- Listed height: 5 ft 10 in (1.78 m)
- Listed weight: 207 lb (94 kg)

Career information
- High school: Red Bank Catholic (Red Bank, New Jersey)
- College: UConn (2005–2008)
- NFL draft: 2009: 1st round, 27th overall pick

Career history
- Indianapolis Colts (2009–2013); San Diego Chargers (2014–2015); New England Patriots (2016)*
- * Offseason or practice squad member only

Awards and highlights
- First-team All-American (2008); Big East Offensive Player of the Year (2008); First-team All-Big East (2008); Second-team All-Big East (2006)

Career NFL statistics
- Rushing attempts: 695
- Rushing yards: 2,829
- Rushing touchdowns: 18
- Receptions: 120
- Receiving yards: 1,066
- Receiving touchdowns: 2
- Stats at Pro Football Reference

Donald Eugene Brown II (born April 11, 1987) is an American former professional football player who was a running back in the National Football League (NFL) for seven seasons, primarily with the Indianapolis Colts. He played college football for the UConn Huskies, earning first-team All-American honors in 2008 and becoming the school's all-time leading rusher. Brown was selected in the first round of the 2009 NFL draft by the Colts, where he spent his first five seasons. In his last two seasons, he was a member of the San Diego Chargers.

== Early life ==
Brown attended Red Bank Catholic High School in Red Bank, New Jersey, where he played football and ran track. During his senior season, Brown rushed for 2,032 yards and 27 touchdowns. In track, Brown was timed at 11.3 seconds in the 100 meters and 23.2 seconds in the 200 meters. Considered a three-star recruit by Rivals.com, Brown was listed as the No. 53 running back prospect in the nation in 2005. He picked Connecticut over Wisconsin on December 8, 2004.

== College career ==
Brown signed a national letter of intent to enroll at the University of Connecticut on February 2, 2005. He would conclude his collegiate career as the all-time leading rusher for the Huskies with 3,800 yards. After rushing for over 2,000 yards in his junior year, Brown decided to forgo his senior year to enter the 2009 NFL draft.

=== 2006 season ===
Brown entered his redshirt freshman season in 2006 as a kickoff returner and second string running back behind senior captain and incumbent starter, Terry Caulley. Brown showed flashes of his running ability in the first game of the year, when he rushed for 118 yards on only 9 carries, including a 53-yard touchdown run, against Rhode Island. He would play primarily on special teams for the first half of the year. However, when Caulley went down with an injury before Connecticut's game against Rutgers on October 29, Brown was asked to make his first career start at running back. He made the most of this opportunity, as he rushed for 199 yards on 28 carries and 2 touchdowns. This performance proved to be too good to ignore, as he was awarded the starting job for the rest of the season. Brown had his best outing of his freshman campaign in the next game when he rushed for 205 yards on 43 carries with 3 touchdowns (1 receiving) in Connecticut's 46–45 double overtime win over Pittsburgh. Brown would average 134 yards per game in the five Big East games that he started. He finished the year with 896 yards and 9 touchdowns (2 receiving), which was good enough to award him with a 2nd team All Big East nomination.

=== 2007 season ===
Brown began his sophomore season with heightened expectations brought on by his very successful rookie campaign. However, nagging injuries combined with the emergence of fellow sophomore Andre Dixon would hamper his sophomore season. He would finish the year with 821 yards and 8 touchdowns, which was good for second on the team, behind Dixon. Twice, Brown ran for 100 yards in a game (against Rutgers and West Virginia) and just missed two more by rushing for 99 yards against Duke and Syracuse.

=== 2008 season ===
A pre-season ankle injury to Dixon would cement Brown as the Huskies starting running back for the start of his junior season. It would be a position that he would not relinquish. Brown would begin the year with eight straight 100 yard games and would twice eclipse the 200 yard mark (against Temple and Virginia). He arguably had his best performance in the second game of the year as he rushed for 214 yards on 36 carries and the game's only touchdown against Temple, in a game played in a monsoon due to Tropical Storm Hannah. Included in his 214 yards was every one of Connecticut's 25 yards in overtime. Brown rushed for 150 yards in the eighth game of the season at home in a 40–16 Connecticut victory over eventual Big East champion Cincinnati. These 150 yards increased his season total to 1,324, which set a new Connecticut single-season record. The old tally of 1,262 had been set by Tory Taylor in 1995. Brown needed only eight games to break Taylor's record. Brown continued his record-breaking season in the tenth game at Syracuse. In that game, he rushed for 131 yards on 31 attempts. A 49-yard touchdown run in the second quarter would allow Brown to surpass Caulley as Connecticut's all-time leading rusher. Brown would finish the regular season with 1,822 yards, which placed him first for rushing in the NCAA Division I FBS. His performance awarded him the Big East Offensive Player of the Year. On January 3, 2009, Brown was named Player of the Game in UConn's 38–20 victory over the University at Buffalo in the 2009 International Bowl in Toronto. He finished the game with 261 yards rushing (208 in the first half) and a touchdown. He finished the season with 2,083 rushing yards, becoming only the 14th player in FBS history to rush for over 2,000 yards in a single season. On January 8, 2009, Brown was named Eastern College Athletic Conference Player of the Year. Following the International Bowl, Brown announced his intention to enter the 2009 NFL Draft.

== Professional career ==
=== Pre-draft ===
Brown was considered one of the top three running back prospects available in the draft (alongside Knowshon Moreno and Chris Wells) and drew comparisons to Willie Parker.

Pre-draft measurables
Height	Weight	Arm length	Hand span	40-yard dash	10-yard split	20-yard split	20-yard shuttle	Three-cone drill	Vertical jump	Broad jump
5 ft 10 1/4 in (1.78 m)	210 lb (95 kg)	31 1/2 in (0.80 m)	9 in (0.23 m)	4.51 s	1.62 s	2.66 s	4.10 s	6.93 s	41.5 in (1.05 m)	10 ft 5 in (3.18 m)
All values from NFL Combine

=== Indianapolis Colts ===
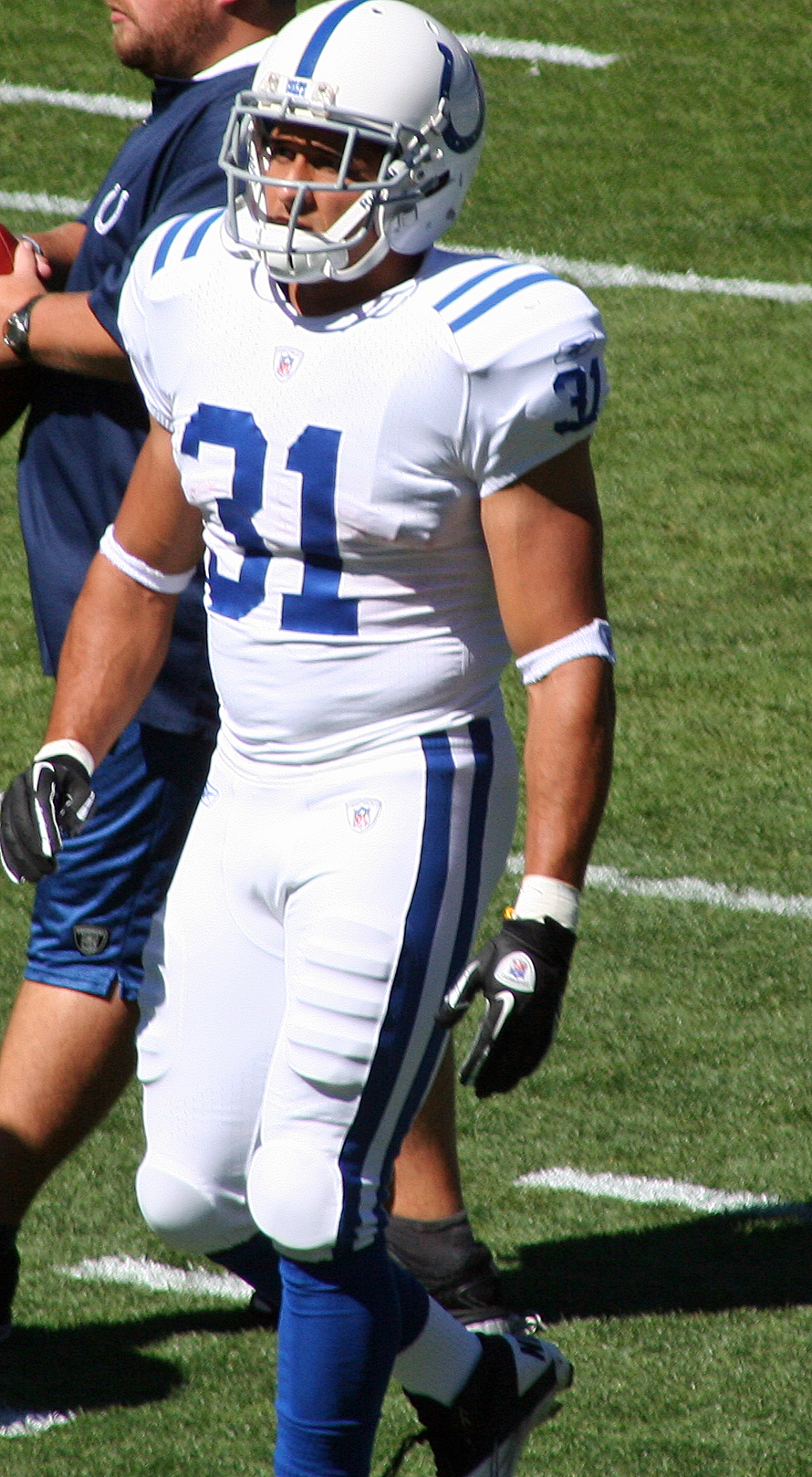
Brown with the Colts in 2010

Brown was selected with the 27th pick in the 2009 NFL draft by the Indianapolis Colts. Brown became the first Connecticut Husky ever to be picked in the first round of an NFL Draft. He signed a five-year contract with the Indianapolis Colts on August 2, 2009. In his first action as a member of the team, Brown ran for 58 yards on five carries against the Minnesota Vikings in the first week of the preseason. He scored his first touchdown on September 21, 2009, against the Miami Dolphins in a 27–23 Colts win.

On December 19, 2010, Donald recorded his first 100+ yard game in a 34–24 win against the Jaguars.

Brown saw increased playing time during the 2011 regular season. He had his best game as a professional in a Week 15 27–13 win over the Tennessee Titans when he rushed 16 times for 161 yards and scored a touchdown on an 80-yard run in the fourth quarter to seal the first victory of the season for Indianapolis.

Brown's 2012 season was hampered by some nagging injuries and the showing of rookie back Vick Ballard. He wasn't very effective the entire season, posting no 100 yard games and only one rushing touchdown.

Brown was originally not a starter for the Colts in the 2013 season. However, due to injuries and lack of production from other running backs, Brown was named the starting running back against the Tennessee Titans in Week 13. He ran for 54 yards and a touchdown. He would remain the starter for the remainder of the regular season.

=== San Diego Chargers ===
On March 11, 2014, Brown signed a three-year, $10.5 million contract with the San Diego Chargers. $4 million of the contract is guaranteed.

He was released on October 3, 2015, but re-signed two days later. On March 3, 2016, Brown was released.

=== New England Patriots ===
On March 16, 2016, Brown signed a one-year contract with the New England Patriots worth $965,000 with $300,000 guaranteed. On August 23, 2016, Brown was released by the Patriots.

== Career statistics ==
=== NFL ===
Regular season
Year	Team	Games		Rushing							Receiving						Fumbles	
Year	Team	GP	GS	Att	A/G	Yds	Avg	Y/G	TD	Lng	Rec	Yds	Avg	Y/G	Lng	TD	Fum	Lost
2009	IND	11	1	78	7.1	281	3.6	22.5	3	45	11	169	15.4	15.4	72	0	1	0
2010	IND	13	8	129	9.9	497	3.9	38.2	2	49	20	205	10.3	15.8	25	0	0	0
2011	IND	16	2	134	8.4	645	4.8	40.3	5	80T	16	86	5.4	5.4	17	0	0	0
2012	IND	10	4	108	10.8	417	3.9	41.7	1	19	9	93	10.3	9.3	39	0	0	0
2013	IND	16	5	102	6.4	537	5.3	33.6	6	51T	27	214	7.9	13.4	33T	2	0	0
2014	SD	13	3	85	6.5	223	2.6	17.2	0	16	29	211	7.3	16.2	24	0	1	0
2015	SD	9	2	59	5.9	229	3.9	22.9	1	53	8	88	11.0	8.8	31	0	1	0
Total		88	25	695	7.9	2,829	4.1	31.8	18	80	89	1,066	8.9	12.0	72	2	3	0

Postseason
Year	Team	Games		Rushing					Receiving					Fumbles	
Year	Team	GP	GS	Att	Yds	Avg	Lng	TD	Rec	Yds	Avg	Lng	TD	Fum	Lost
2009	IND	3	0	16	46	2.9	13	0	3	26	8.7	11	0	0	0
2013	IND	1	1	11	55	5.0	13	1	4	47	11.8	25	1	1	0
Total		4	1	27	101	3.7	13	1	7	73	10.4	25	1	1	0

=== College ===
Year	Team	Rush Att	Rush Yds	Rush Avg	Rush TD	Rec Att	Rec Yds	Rec Avg	Rec TD
2005	Connecticut	Redshirted							
2006	Connecticut	161	999	5.6	7	13	66	5.1	2
2007	Connecticut	170	821	4.8	8	14	85	6.1	0
2008	Connecticut	367	2,083	5.7	18	21	125	6.0	0
Career		698	3,800	5.4	33	48	276	5.8	2

== See also ==
- List of college football yearly rushing leaders
