= 2007 New York Dragons season =

Arena Football League team season

- Head coach: Weylan Harding
- Home stadium: Nassau Veterans Memorial Coliseum

Results
- Record: 5–11
- Division place: 4th

The 2007 New York Dragons season was the 12th season for the franchise. They look to make the playoffs again after finishing 2006 with a 10–6 record. They went 5–11 and missed the playoffs.

== Schedule ==
| Week | Date | Opponent | Home/Away Game | Result |
|---|---|---|---|---|
| 1 | March 4 | Dallas Desperados | Home | L 60–7 |
| 2 | | Bye | Week | |
| 3 | March 18 | Chicago Rush | Away | L 61–40 |
| 4 | March 23 | Tampa Bay Storm | Away | W 59–52 |
| 5 | April 1 | Philadelphia Soul | Home | L 65–60 |
| 6 | April 7 | Grand Rapids Rampage | Away | L 66–53 |
| 7 | April 15 | Colorado Crush | Home | L 49–48 |
| 8 | April 20 | Orlando Predators | Away | L 52–47 |
| 9 | April 28 | Arizona Rattlers | Home | W 67–45 |
| 10 | May 4 | Columbus Destroyers | Away | L 51–42 |
| 11 | May 14 | Philadelphia Soul | Away | W 69–49 |
| 12 | May 20 | Kansas City Brigade | Home | W 62–56 |
| 13 | May 28 | New Orleans VooDoo | Away | W 69–63 |
| 14 | June 2 | Austin Wranglers | Home | L 82–54 |
| 15 | June 9 | Orlando Predators | Home | L 75–54 |
| 16 | June 16 | Dallas Desperados | Away | L 67–13 |
| 17 | June 23 | Columbus Destroyers | Home | L 74–43 |

== Personnel moves ==
=== 2007 roster ===
| Uniform # | Player | Position | Height | Weight (lb) |
| 86 | Chris Anthony | WR/LB | 6' 3" | 200 |
| 6 | Rufus Brown | DS | 5' 9" | 188 |
| 97 | Delbert Cowsette | OL/DL | 6' 1" | 300 |
| 6 | Rohan Davey | QB | 6' 2" | 245 |
| 90 | Mondre Dickerson | DL | 6' 4" | 325 |
| 24 | Ukee Dozier | DB | 6' 1" | 195 |
| 57 | Ricky Hall | OL/DL | 6' 3" | 205 |
| 26 | Will Holder | DB | 6' 1" | 200 |
| 1 | Mike Horacek | WR/LB | 6' 2" | 200 |
| 65 | Joe Laudano | OL/DL | 6' 2" | 285 |
| 51 | Ivory McCoy | FB/LB | 6' 4" | 255 |
| 55 | Craig Moore | OL/DL | 6' 4" | 340 |
| 64 | John Nix | DL | 6' 1" | 310 |
| | Ifeanyi Ohalete | DB | 6' 2" | 220 |
| 7 | Billy Parker | DB | 6' 0" | 195 |
| 42 | Jeremiah Pharms | FB/LB | 6' 2" | 250 |
| 76 | Greg Randall | OL/DL | 6' 6" | 335 |
| | Josh Shaw | DL | 6' 3" | 310 |
| 3 | Kevin Swayne | WR | 6' 2" | 190 |
| 5 | Ja`Mar Toombs | FB/LB | 6' 1" | 255 |
| 11 | Carter Warley | K | 6' 0" | 195 |
| 99 | Paul White | OL/DL | 6' 1" | 290 |
| | Jason Willis | WR | 6' 1" | 200 |
| 21 | Yaacov Yisrael | WR/DB | 6' 0" | 195 |

== Coaching ==
Weylan Harding started his third season as head coach of the Dragons.

== Stats ==
=== Offense ===
==== Quarterback ====
| Player | Comp. | Att. | Comp% | Yards | TD's | INT's | Long | Rating |
|---|---|---|---|---|---|---|---|---|
| Aaron Garcia | 149 | 220 | 67.7 | 1724 | 45 | 4 | 40 | 123.2 |
| Rohan Davey | 216 | 364 | 59.3 | 2612 | 45 | 17 | 46 | 92.9 |

==== Running backs ====
| Player | Car. | Yards | Avg. | TD's | Long |
|---|---|---|---|---|---|
| Ja'Mar Toombs | 33 | 97 | 2.9 | 11 | 24 |
| Rohan Davey | 12 | 56 | 4.7 | 2 | 30 |
| Mike Horacek | 4 | 39 | 9.8 | 1 | 35 |
| Ricky Hall | 11 | 29 | 2.6 | 0 | 16 |
| Asad Abdul-Khaliq | 1 | 11 | 11 | 0 | 11 |
| Kevin Swayne | 1 | 7 | 7 | 0 | 7 |
| Jason Willis | 1 | 1 | 1 | 1 | 1 |
| Bruce Blue | 1 | 0 | 0 | 0 | 0 |

==== Wide receivers ====
| Player | Rec. | Yards | Avg. | TD's | Long |
|---|---|---|---|---|---|
| Mike Horacek | 102 | 1470 | 14.4 | 32 | 45 |
| Kevin Swayne | 92 | 1023 | 11.1 | 27 | 44 |
| Chris Anthony | 69 | 717 | 10.4 | 17 | 33 |
| Jason Willis | 51 | 639 | 12.5 | 8 | 46 |
| Will Holder | 18 | 183 | 10.2 | 2 | 26 |
| Ja'Mar Toombs | 12 | 108 | 9 | 0 | 18 |
| Keron Henry | 9 | 95 | 10.6 | 2 | 18 |
| DaShane Dennis | 5 | 76 | 15.2 | 1 | 30 |
| Ricky Hall | 10 | 72 | 7.2 | 1 | 12 |
| John Chestnut | 1 | 5 | 5 | 0 | 5 |
| Jeremiah Pharms | 1 | 0 | 0 | 0 | 0 |

==== Touchdowns ====
| Player | TD's | Rush | Rec | Ret | Pts |
|---|---|---|---|---|---|
| Mike Horacek | 33 | 1 | 32 | 0 | 200 |
| Kevin Swayne | 27 | 0 | 27 | 0 | 172 |
| Chris Anthony | 17 | 0 | 17 | 0 | 108 |
| Ja'Mar Toombs | 11 | 11 | 0 | 0 | 66 |
| Jason Willis | 9 | 1 | 8 | 0 | 54 |
| DaShane Dennis | 4 | 0 | 1 | 3 | 24 |
| Will Holder | 2 | 0 | 2 | 0 | 24 |
| Rohan Davey | 2 | 2 | 0 | 0 | 12 |
| Keron Henry | 2 | 0 | 2 | 0 | 12 |
| Ricky Hall | 1 | 0 | 1 | 0 | 6 |

=== Defense ===
| Player | Tackles | Solo | Assisted | Sack | Solo | Assisted | INT | Yards | TD's | Long |
|---|---|---|---|---|---|---|---|---|---|---|
| DaShane Dennis | 81 | 70 | 22 | 0 | 0 | 0 | 2 | 0 | 0 | 0 |
| Ifeanyi Ohalete | 68.5 | 58 | 21 | 0 | 0 | 0 | 1 | 3 | 0 | 3 |
| Will Holder | 66 | 61 | 10 | 0 | 0 | 0 | 5 | 74 | 2 | 33 |
| Billy Parker | 66 | 61 | 10 | 0 | 0 | 0 | 4 | 39 | 1 | 21 |
| Jeremiah Pharms | 32 | 24 | 16 | 0 | 0 | 0 | 1 | 9 | 0 | 9 |
| Chris Anthony | 21.5 | 19 | 5 | 0 | 0 | 0 | 3 | 9 | 0 | 9 |
| Daniel Garay | 17 | 13 | 8 | 0 | 0 | 0 | 0 | 0 | 0 | 0 |
| Kevin Carberry | 13.5 | 12 | 3 | 2 | 2 | 0 | 0 | 0 | 0 | 0 |
| Ukee Dozier | 12 | 9 | 6 | 0 | 0 | 0 | 1 | 11 | 0 | 11 |
| John Nix | 10.5 | 8 | 5 | 2 | 2 | 0 | 0 | 0 | 0 | 0 |
| Keron Henry | 10 | 8 | 4 | 0 | 0 | 0 | 1 | 0 | 0 | 0 |
| Bruce Blue | 8 | 4 | 8 | 1 | 1 | 0 | 0 | 0 | 0 | 0 |
| Carter Warley | 8 | 6 | 4 | 0 | 0 | 0 | 0 | 0 | 0 | 0 |
| Jason Willis | 8 | 6 | 4 | 0 | 0 | 0 | 0 | 0 | 0 | 0 |
| Cletidus Hunt | 7.5 | 4 | 7 | 0 | 0 | 0 | 0 | 0 | 0 | 0 |
| Paul White | 7.5 | 4 | 6 | 0 | 0 | 0 | 0 | 0 | 0 | 0 |
| Asad Abdul-Khaliq | 6 | 6 | 0 | 0 | 0 | 0 | 0 | 0 | 0 | 0 |
| Josh Shaw | 6 | 4 | 4 | 0 | 0 | 0 | 0 | 0 | 0 | 0 |
| Ricky Hall | 5.5 | 5 | 1 | 1 | 1 | 0 | 0 | 0 | 0 | 0 |
| Ja'Mar Toombs | 5 | 5 | 0 | 0 | 0 | 0 | 0 | 0 | 0 | 0 |
| Ivory McCoy | 4.5 | 3 | 3 | 0 | 0 | 0 | 0 | 0 | 0 | 0 |
| John Chestnut | 4 | 4 | 0 | 0 | 0 | 0 | 0 | 0 | 0 | 0 |
| Pete Traynor | 3.5 | 2 | 3 | 0 | 0 | 0 | 0 | 0 | 0 | 0 |
| Val Barnaby | 2 | 2 | 0 | 0 | 0 | 0 | 0 | 0 | 0 | 0 |
| Mike Horacek | 2 | 2 | 0 | 0 | 0 | 0 | 0 | 0 | 0 | 0 |
| Kevin Swayne | 2 | 2 | 0 | 0 | 0 | 0 | 0 | 0 | 0 | 0 |
| Joe Laudano | 1.5 | 1 | 1 | 0 | 0 | 0 | 0 | 0 | 0 | 0 |
| Greg Randall | 1.5 | 1 | 1 | 0 | 0 | 0 | 0 | 0 | 0 | 0 |
| Rohan Davey | 1 | 1 | 0 | 0 | 0 | 0 | 0 | 0 | 0 | 0 |
| Corey Jackson | 1 | 1 | 0 | 0 | 0 | 0 | 0 | 0 | 0 | 0 |
| Vontrell Jamison | 1 | 1 | 0 | 1 | 1 | 0 | 0 | 0 | 0 | 0 |
| Adam Roberts | 1 | 1 | 0 | 0 | 0 | 0 | 0 | 0 | 0 | 0 |

=== Special teams ===
==== Kick return ====
| Player | Ret | Yards | TD's | Long | Avg | Ret | Yards | TD's | Long | Avg |
|---|---|---|---|---|---|---|---|---|---|---|
| DaShane Dennis | 58 | 1282 | 3 | 57 | 22.1 | 2 | 29 | 0 | 20 | 14.5 |
| Will Holder | 32 | 587 | 0 | 28 | 18.3 | 3 | 22 | 0 | 14 | 7.3 |
| Jason Willis | 8 | 130 | 0 | 35 | 16.3 | 0 | 0 | 0 | 0 | 0 |
| Kevin Swayne | 3 | 57 | 0 | 38 | 19 | 0 | 0 | 0 | 0 | 0 |
| John Chestnut | 2 | 43 | 0 | 25 | 21.5 | 0 | 0 | 0 | 0 | 0 |
| Keron Henry | 2 | 4 | 0 | 2 | 2 | 0 | 0 | 0 | 0 | 0 |
| Ifeanyi Ohalete | 0 | 0 | 0 | 0 | 0 | 1 | 7 | 0 | 7 | 7 |
| Chris Anthony | 0 | 0 | 0 | 0 | 0 | 1 | 0 | 0 | 0 | 0 |
| Carter Warley | 0 | 0 | 0 | 0 | 0 | 1 | 0 | 0 | 0 | 0 |

==== Kicking ====
| Player | Extra pt. | Extra pt. Att. | FG | FGA | Long | Pct. | Pts |
|---|---|---|---|---|---|---|---|
| Carter Warley | 85 | 97 | 6 | 15 | 48 | 0.400 | 103 |

== Regular season ==
=== Week 1: vs Dallas Desperados ===
Scoring Summary:

1st Quarter:

2nd Quarter:

3rd Quarter:

4th Quarter:

=== Week 3: at Chicago Rush ===
Scoring Summary:

1st Quarter:

2nd Quarter:

3rd Quarter:

4th Quarter:

=== Week 4: at Tampa Bay Storm ===
Scoring Summary:

1st Quarter:

2nd Quarter:

3rd Quarter:

4th Quarter:

=== Week 5: vs Philadelphia Soul ===
Scoring Summary:

1st Quarter:

2nd Quarter:

3rd Quarter:

4th Quarter:

=== Week 6: at Grand Rapids Rampage ===
Scoring Summary:

1st Quarter:

2nd Quarter:

3rd Quarter:

4th Quarter:

=== Week 7: vs Colorado Crush ===
Scoring Summary:

1st Quarter:

2nd Quarter:

3rd Quarter:

4th Quarter:

=== Week 8: at Orlando Predators ===
Scoring Summary:

1st Quarter:

2nd Quarter:

3rd Quarter:

4th Quarter:

=== Week 9: vs Arizona Rattlers ===
Scoring Summary:

1st Quarter:

2nd Quarter:

3rd Quarter:

4th Quarter:

=== Week 10: at Columbus Destroyers ===
Scoring Summary:

1st Quarter:

2nd Quarter:

3rd Quarter:

4th Quarter:

=== Week 11: at Philadelphia Soul ===
Scoring Summary:

1st Quarter:

2nd Quarter:

3rd Quarter:

4th Quarter:

=== Week 12: vs Kansas City Brigade ===
Scoring Summary:

1st Quarter:

2nd Quarter:

3rd Quarter:

4th Quarter:

=== Week 13: at New Orleans VooDoo ===
Scoring Summary:

1st Quarter:

2nd Quarter:

3rd Quarter:

4th Quarter:

=== Week 14: vs Austin Wranglers ===
Scoring Summary:

1st Quarter:

2nd Quarter:

3rd Quarter:

4th Quarter:

=== Week 15: vs Orlando Predators ===
Scoring Summary:

1st Quarter:

2nd Quarter:

3rd Quarter:

4th Quarter:

=== Week 16: at Dallas Desperados ===
Scoring Summary:

1st Quarter:

2nd Quarter:

3rd Quarter:

4th Quarter:

=== Week 17: vs Columbus Destroyers ===
Scoring Summary:

1st Quarter:

2nd Quarter:

3rd Quarter:

4th Quarter:
