= 2004 Connecticut Huskies football team =

American college football season

2004 Connecticut Huskies football
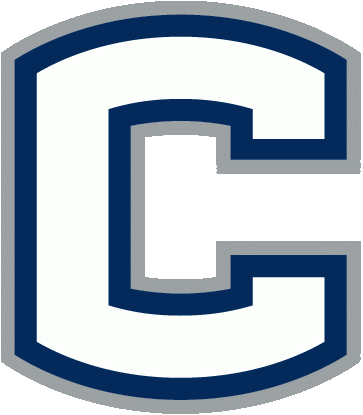

Motor City Bowl champion

Motor City Bowl, W 39–10 vs. Toledo
- Conference: Big East Conference
- Record: 8–4 (3–3 Big East)
- Head coach: Randy Edsall (6th season)
- Offensive coordinator: Norries Wilson (3rd season)
- Offensive scheme: Multiple
- Defensive coordinator: Hank Hughes (3rd season)
- Base defense: 4–3
- Home stadium: Rentschler Field

2004 Big East Conference football standings
	Conf.			Overall
Team	W		L	W		L
No. 21 Boston College +	4	–	2	9	–	3
No. 25 Pittsburgh $+	4	–	2	8	–	4
West Virginia +	4	–	2	8	–	4
Syracuse +	4	–	2	6	–	6
Connecticut	3	–	3	8	–	4
Rutgers	1	–	5	4	–	7
Temple	1	–	5	2	–	9
$ – BCS representative as conference champion; + – Conference co-champions; Rankings from AP Poll

The 2004 Connecticut Huskies football team represented the University of Connecticut as a member of the Big East Conference during the 2004 NCAA Division I-A football season. Led by sixth-year head coach Randy Edsall, the Huskies compiled an overall record of 8–4 with a mark of 3–3 in conference play, placing fifth in the Big East. Connecticut was invited to a bowl game for the first time in program history, defeating Toledo in the Motor City Bowl. The team played home games at Rentschler Field in East Hartford, Connecticut.

== Schedule ==
Date	Time	Opponent	Site	TV	Result	Attendance
September 4	12:00 pm	Murray State*	Rentschler Field; East Hartford, CT		W 52–14	35,129
September 11	12:00 pm	Duke*	Rentschler Field; East Hartford, CT		W 22–20	40,000
September 17	8:00 pm	at Boston College	Alumni Stadium; Chestnut Hill, MA	ESPN2	L 7–27	42,564
September 25	12:00 pm	Army*	Rentschler Field; East Hartford, CT		W 40–3	40,000
September 30	7:00 pm	Pittsburgh	Rentschler Field; East Hartford, CT	ESPN2	W 29–17	40,000
October 13	7:30 pm	No. 17 West Virginia	Rentschler Field; East Hartford, CT	ESPN2	L 19–31	40,000
October 23	12:00 pm	Temple^{†}	Rentschler Field; East Hartford, CT		W 45–31	40,000
October 30	1:30 pm	at Syracuse	Carrier Dome; Syracuse, NY (rivalry)		L 30–42	34,545
November 13	1:00 pm	at Georgia Tech*	Bobby Dodd Stadium; Atlanta, GA		L 10–30	43,577
November 20	12:00 pm	Buffalo*	Rentschler Field; East Hartford, CT		W 29–0	40,000
November 25	10:00 am	at Rutgers	Rutgers Stadium; Piscataway, NJ	ESPN2	W 41–35	20,224
December 27	5:30 pm	vs. Toledo*	Ford Field; Detroit, MI (Motor City Bowl)	ESPN2	W 39–10	52,552
*Non-conference game; ^{†}Homecoming; Rankings from AP Poll released prior to the game; All times are in Eastern time

== Game summaries ==
=== Murray State ===
Murray State Racers at Connecticut Huskies – Game summary

Quarter	1	2	3	4	Total
Racers	7	7	0	0	14
Huskies	7	7	28	10	52

at Rentschler Field, East Hartford, Connecticut

- Date: September 14
- Game time: 12:00 p.m. EDT
- Game attendance: 35,129
- Box score, Stats

Game information
First quarter
- CONN – Matt Lawrence 34-yard pass from Dan Orlovsky (Matt Nuzie kick), 11:16. Huskies 7–0. Drive: 9 plays, 72 yards, 2:20.
- MURR – Nick Turner 3-yard run (Morgan Riley kick), 9:15. Tied 7–7. Drive: 7 plays, 74 yards, 1:51.

Second quarter

- CONN – Matt Lawrence 3-yard run (Matt Nuzie kick), 9:03. Huskies 14–7. Drive: 15 plays, 66 yards, 5:15.
- MURR – Nick Turner 94-yard kickoff return (Morgan Riley kick), 8:48. Tied 14–14.

Third quarter

- CONN – Jason Williams 40-yard pass from Dan Orlovsky (Matt Nuzie kick), 11:44. Huskies 21–14. Drive: 4 plays, 54 yards, 0:15.
- CONN – Keron Henry 31-yard pass from Dan Orlovsky (Matt Nuzie kick), 7:16. Huskies 28–14. Drive: 7 plays, 78 yards, 0:45.
- CONN – Jason Williams 80-yard pass from Dan Orlovsky (Matt Nuzie kick), 5:44. Huskies 35–14. Drive: 1 play, 60 yards, 0:11.
- CONN – Dan Murray 61-yard pass from Dan Orlovsky (Matt Nuzie kick), 0:00. Huskies 42–14. Drive: 4 plays, 79 yards, 1:42.

Fourth quarter

- CONN – Alfred Fincher 16-yard interception return (Matt Nuzie kick), 7:35. Huskies 49–14.
- CONN – Matt Nuzie 22-yard field goal, 2:40. Huskies 52–14. Drive: 4 plays, 7 yards, 0:10.

Statistics	MURR	CONN
First downs	10	23
Total yards	167	530
Rushing yards	76	144
Passing yards	91	386
Turnovers	1	2
Penalties–yards	2–20	0–0

Team	Category	Player	Statistics
Murray State	Passing	Adam Fisher	5/8, 78 yards
Murray State	Rushing	Ron Lane	10 rushes, 39 yards
Murray State	Receiving	Daniel Rumley	2 receptions, 53 yards
Connecticut	Passing	Dan Orlovsky	19/29, 382 yards, 5 TD, 2 INT
Connecticut	Rushing	Matt Lawrence	18 rushes, 76 yards, TD
Connecticut	Receiving	Jason Williams	4 receptions, 128 yards, 2 TD

=== Duke ===
Duke Blue Devils at Connecticut Huskies – Game summary

Quarter	1	2	3	4	Total
Blue Devils	7	6	7	0	20
Huskies	3	0	3	16	22

at Rentschler Field, East Hartford, Connecticut

- Date: September 11
- Game time: 12:00 p.m. EDT
- Game attendance: 40,000
- Box score

Game information
First quarter
- CONN – Matt Nuzie 21-yard field goal, 5:57. Huskies 3–0. Drive: 10 plays, 32 yards, 3:44.
- DUKE – John Talley 62-yard interception return (Matt Brooks kick), 2:55. Blue Devils 7–3.

Second quarter

- DUKE – Matt Brooks 24-yard field goal, 12:05. Blue Devils 10–3. Drive: 9 plays, 53 yards, 1:53.
- DUKE – Matt Brooks 36-yard field goal, 8:20. Blue Devils 13–3. Drive: 6 plays, 23 yards, 1:40.

Third quarter

- CONN – Matt Nuzie 23-yard field goal, 6:41. Blue Devils 13–6. Drive: 9 plays, 75 yards, 4:09.
- DUKE – Calen Powell 2-yard pass from Chris Dapolito (Matt Brooks kick), 2:00. Blue Devils 20–6. Drive: 9 plays, 71 yards, 2:35.

Fourth quarter

- CONN – Cornell Brockington 1-yard run (Matt Nuzie kick), 11:05. Blue Devils 20–13. Drive: 13 plays, 71 yards, 5:04.
- CONN – Justin Perkins 27-yard interception return (kick failed), 10:14. Blue Devils 20–19.
- CONN – Matt Nuzie 21-yard field goal, 3:40. Huskies 22–20. Drive: 8 plays, 67 yards, 2:36.

Statistics	DUKE	CONN
First downs	12	16
Total yards	245	402
Rushing yards	61	112
Passing yards	184	290
Turnovers	2	2
Penalties–yards	5–43	6–79

Team	Category	Player	Statistics
Duke	Passing	Chris Dapolito	12/21, 129 yards, TD, INT
Duke	Rushing	Aaron Fryer	20 rushes, 59 yards
Duke	Receiving	Ronnie Elliott	3 receptions, 46 yards
Connecticut	Passing	Dan Orlovsky	23/34, 290 yards, INT
Connecticut	Rushing	Cornell Brockington	20 rushes, 78 yards, TD
Connecticut	Receiving	Keron Henry	8 receptions, 112 yards

=== At Boston College ===
Connecticut Huskies at Boston College Eagles – Game summary

Quarter	1	2	3	4	Total
Huskies	0	7	0	0	7
Eagles	7	10	0	10	27

at Alumni Stadium, Chestnut Hill, Massachusetts

- Date: September 17
- Game time: 8:00 p.m. EDT
- Game attendance: 42,564
- TV: ESPN2
- Box score

Game information
First quarter
- BC – Joel Hazard 12-yard pass from Paul Peterson (Ryan Ohliger kick), 14:12. Eagles 7–0. Drive: 2 plays, 13 yards, 0:28.

Second quarter

- BC – Ryan Ohliger 42-yard field goal, 11:44. Eagles 10–0. Drive: 12 plays, 62 yards, 5:43.
- BC – Andre Callender 1-yard run (Ryan Ohliger kick), 4:27. Eagles 17–0. Drive: 10 plays, 79 yards, 3:22.
- CONN – Cornell Brockington 7-yard run (Matt Nuzie kick), 0:50. Eagles 17–7. Drive: 9 plays, 79 yards, 3:22.

Third quarter

- No scoring plays

Fourth quarter

- BC – Grant Adams 34-yard pass from Paul Peterson (Ryan Ohliger kick), 12:20. Eagles 24–7. Drive: 5 plays, 64 yards, 1:49.
- BC – Ryan Ohliger 37-yard field goal, 5:04. Eagles 27–7. Drive: 10 plays, 26 yards, 5:11.

Statistics	CONN	BC
First downs	18	21
Total yards	291	334
Rushing yards	98	141
Passing yards	193	193
Turnovers	2	2
Penalties–yards	7–94	6–50

Team	Category	Player	Statistics
Connecticut	Passing	Dan Orlovsky	22/32, 193 yards, INT
Connecticut	Rushing	Cornell Brockington	24 rushes, 105 yards, TD
Connecticut	Receiving	Matt Cutia	4 receptions, 50 yards
Boston College	Passing	Paul Peterson	14/23, 193 yards, 2 TD, INT
Boston College	Rushing	Andre Callender	26 rushes, 98 yards, TD
Boston College	Receiving	Grant Adams	5 receptions, 85 yards, TD

=== Army ===
Army Black Knights at Connecticut Huskies – Game summary

Quarter	1	2	3	4	Total
Black Knights	3	0	0	0	3
Huskies	14	13	10	3	40

at Rentschler Field, East Hartford, Connecticut

- Date: September 25
- Game time: 12:00 p.m. EDT
- Game attendance: 40,000
- Box score

Game information
First quarter
- CONN – Dan Murray 3-yard pass from Dan Orlovsky (Matt Nuzie kick), 13:00. Huskies 7–0. Drive: 6 plays, 73 yards, 1:40.
- CONN – Keron Henry 45-yard pass from Dan Orlovsky (Matt Nuzie kick), 11:12. Huskies 14–0. Drive: 2 plays, 52 yards, 0:35.
- ARMY – Austin Miller 44-yard field goal, 3:05. Huskies 14–3. Drive: 7 plays, 50 yards, 2:07.

Second quarter

- CONN – Cornell Brockington 4-yard run (kick failed), 11:31. Huskies 20–3. Drive: 8 plays, 66 yards, 2:10.
- CONN – Keron Henry 15-yard pass from Dan Orlovsky (Matt Nuzie kick), 3:09. Huskies 27–3. Drive: 5 plays, 35 yards, 1:15.

Third quarter

- CONN – Tim Lassen 1-yard pass from Dan Orlovsky (Matt Nuzie kick), 9:05. Huskies 34–3. Drive: 8 plays, 59 yards, 3:11.
- CONN – Matt Nuzie 26-yard field goal, 2:02. Huskies 37–3. Drive: 11 plays, 65 yards, 3:47.

Fourth quarter

- CONN – Matt Nuzie 34-yard field goal, 12:14. Huskies 40–3. Drive: 9 plays, 38 yards, 2:38.

Statistics	ARMY	CONN
First downs	17	30
Total yards	250	503
Rushing yards	136	199
Passing yards	114	304
Turnovers	2	1
Penalties–yards	6–49	7–49

Team	Category	Player	Statistics
Army	Passing	Matt Silva	9/20, 87 yards
Army	Rushing	Carlton Jones	16 rushes, 81 yards
Army	Receiving	Jeremy Trimble	2 receptions, 34 yards
Connecticut	Passing	Dan Orlovsky	25/34, 288 yards, 4 TD, INT
Connecticut	Rushing	Cornell Brockington	17 rushes, 111 yards, TD
Connecticut	Receiving	Keron Henry	7 receptions, 117 yards, 2 TD

=== Pittsburgh ===
Pittsburgh Panthers at Connecticut Huskies – Game summary

Quarter	1	2	3	4	Total
Panthers	7	3	7	0	17
Huskies	7	6	10	6	29

at Rentschler Field, East Hartford, Connecticut

- Date: September 30
- Game time: 7:00 p.m. EDT
- Game attendance: 40,000
- TV: ESPN2
- Box score

Game information
First quarter
- CONN – Justin Perkins 9-yard interception return (Matt Nuzie kick), 6:27. Huskies 7–0.
- PITT – Greg Lee 77-yard pass from Tyler Palko (Josh Cummings kick), 0:00. Tied 7–7. Drive: 2 plays, 76 yards, 0:43.

Second quarter

- CONN – Matt Nuzie 24-yard field goal, 5:02. Huskies 10–7. Drive: 11 plays, 60 yards, 2:57.
- PITT – Josh Cummings 30-yard field goal, 0:19. Tied 10–10. Drive: 12 plays, 50 yards, 4:31.
- CONN – Matt Nuzie 49-yard field goal, 0:00. Huskies 13–10. Drive: 2 plays, 18 yards, 0:08.

Third quarter

- CONN – Matt Nuzie 20-yard field goal, 7:38. Huskies 16–10. Drive: 6 plays, 28 yards, 2:18.
- PITT – Tyler Palko 1-yard run (Josh Cummings kick), 5:44. Panthers 17–16. Drive: 5 plays, 66 yards, 1:50.
- CONN – Keron Henry 8-yard pass from Dan Orlovsky (Matt Nuzie kick), 3:28. Huskies 23–17. Drive: 6 plays, 62 yards, 2:06.

Fourth quarter

- CONN – Cornell Brockington 11-yard run (pass failed), 5:45. Huskies 29–17. Drive: 8 plays, 67 yards, 2:37.

Statistics	PITT	CONN
First downs	14	25
Total yards	349	395
Rushing yards	82	158
Passing yards	267	237
Turnovers	2	2
Penalties–yards	8–48	2–24

Team	Category	Player	Statistics
Pittsburgh	Passing	Tyler Palko	11/31, 267 yards, TD, INT
Pittsburgh	Rushing	Tyler Palko	15 rushes, 49 yards, TD
Pittsburgh	Receiving	Greg Lee	2 receptions, 129 yards, TD
Connecticut	Passing	Dan Orlovsky	23/43, 237 yards, TD, INT
Connecticut	Rushing	Cornell Brockington	31 rushes, 185 yards, TD
Connecticut	Receiving	Keron Henry	7 receptions, 86 yards, TD

=== No. 17 West Virginia ===
No. 17 West Virginia Mountaineers at Connecticut Huskies – Game summary

Quarter	1	2	3	4	Total
No. 17 Mountaineers	7	3	14	7	31
Huskies	3	3	0	13	19

at Rentschler Field, East Hartford, Connecticut

- Date: October 13
- Game time: 7:30 p.m. EDT
- Game attendance: 40,000
- TV: ESPN2

Game information

First quarter

- (5:50) WVU Jason Colson 1 yard run (Brad Cooper kick), (Drive 9 plays, 62 yards, 3:16; 7-0 West Virginia)
- (1:58) CONN Matt Nuzie 21 yard field goal, (Drive 9 plays, 74 yards, 3:42; 7-3 West Virginia)

Second quarter

- (13:09) CONN Matt Nuzie 35 yard field goal, (Drive 5 plays, 10 yards, 1:33; 7-6 West Virginia)
- (3:40) WVU Brad Cooper 39 yard field goal, (Drive 6 plays, 44 yards, 2:10; 10-6 West Virginia)

Third quarter

- (3:53) WVU Mike Lorello 21 yard interception return (Brad Cooper kick), 17-6 West Virginia)
- (2:03) WVU Chris Henry 49 yard pass from Rasheed Marshall (Brad Cooper kick), (Drive 3 plays, 56 yards, 0:43; 24-6 West Virginia)

Fourth quarter

- (6:38) CONN Keron Henry 17 yard pass from Dan Orlovsky (Matt Nuzie kick), (Drive 4 plays, 51 yards, 0:30; 24-13 West Virginia)
- (4:42 WVU Michael Meggett 13 yard run (Brad Cooper kick), (Drive 4 plays, 41 yards, 1:46; 31-13 West Virginia)
- (2:18) CONN Matt Cutaia 2 yard pass from Dan Orlovsky (2-point pass failed), (Drive 12 plays, 73 yards, 2:19; 31-19 West Virginia)

Statistics	WVU	CONN
First downs	20	17
Total yards	462	365
Rushing yards	324	97
Passing yards	138	268
Turnovers	2	3
Penalties–yards	12-104	5-42

Team	Category	Player	Statistics
West Virginia	Passing	Rasheed Marshall	12/20, 138 yards, 1 TD, 1 INT
West Virginia	Rushing	Jason Colson	13 carries, 111 yards, 1 TD
West Virginia	Receiving	Chris Henry	4 receptions, 66 yards, 1 TD
Connecticut	Passing	Dan Orlovsky	24/47, 268 yards, 2 TDs, 3 INTs
Connecticut	Rushing	Cornell Brockington	23 carries, 90 yards
Connecticut	Receiving	Matt Cutaia	5 receptions, 64 yards, 1 TD

=== Temple ===
Temple Owls at Connecticut Huskies – Game summary

Quarter	1	2	3	4	Total
Owls	0	7	3	21	31
Huskies	21	10	7	7	45

at Rentschler Field, East Hartford, Connecticut

- Date: October 23
- Game time: 12:00 p.m. EDT
- Game attendance: 40,000

Game information

First quarter

- (14:44) CONN Larry Taylor 97 yard kickoff return (Matt Nuzie kick), (7-0 Connecticut)
- (11:04) CONN Jason Williams 90 yard pass from Dan Orlovsky (Matt Nuzie kick), (Drive 3 plays, 87 yards, 0:55; 14-0 Connecticut)
- (3:45) CONN Cornell Brockington 61 yard run (Matt Nuzie kick), (Drive 2 plays, 65 yards, 0:07; 21-0 Connecticut)

Second quarter

- (3:31) CONN Matt Nuzie 32 yard field goal, (Drive 10 plays, 75 yards, 2:50; 24-0 Connecticut)
- (1:08) TEM Walter Washington 5 yard run (Ryan Lux kick), (Drive 8 plays, 89 yards, 2:03; 24-7 Connecticut)
- (0:29) CONN Brian Sparks 9 yard pass from Dan Orlovsky (Matt Nuzie kick), (Drive 4 plays, 69 yards, 0:22; 31-7 Connecticut)

Third quarter

- (7:51) TEM Ryan Lux 19 yard field goal, (Drive 15 plays, 77 yards, 5:10; 31-10 Connecticut)
- (3:25) CONN Cornell Brockington 3 yard run (Matt Nuzie kick), (Drive 4 plays, 50 yards, 0:30; 38-10 Connecticut)

Fourth quarter

- (14:53) TEM Walter Washington 4 yard run (Ryan Lux kick), (Drive 5 plays, 42 yards, 0:55; 38-17 Connecticut)
- (6:09) CONN Chris Bellamy 5 yard run (Matt Nuzie kick), (Drive 14 plays, 78 yards, 8:00; 45-17 Connecticut)
- (4:09) TEM Ikey Chuku 24 yard pass from Walter Washington (Ryan Lux kick), (Drive 5 play, 63 yards, 2:01; 45-24 Connecticut)
- (2:51) TEM Phil Goodman 6 yard pass from Walter Washington (Ryan Lux kick), (Drive 8 plays, 52 yards, 1:10; 45-31 Connecticut)

Statistics	TEM	CONN
First downs	23	20
Total yards	475	518
Rushing yards	199	258
Passing yards	276	260
Turnovers	1	4
Penalties–yards	4-28	5-45

Team	Category	Player	Statistics
Temple	Passing	Walter Washington	21/44, 276 yards, 2 TDs, 1 INT
Temple	Rushing	Walter Washington	20 carries, 84 yards, 2 TDs
Temple	Receiving	Buchie Ibeh	4 receptions, 72 yards
Connecticut	Passing	Dan Orlovsky	18/29, 260 yards, 2 TDs, 1 INT
Connecticut	Rushing	Cornell Brockington	15 carries, 181 yards, 2 TDs
Connecticut	Receiving	Keron Henry	3 receptions, 49 yards

=== At Syracuse ===
Connecticut Huskies at Syracuse Orange – Game summary

Quarter	1	2	3	4	Total
Huskies	7	13	3	7	30
Orange	7	14	14	7	42

at Carrier Dome, Syracuse, New York

- Date: October 30
- Game time: 1:30 p.m. EDT
- Game weather: None (played indoors)
- Game attendance: 34,545

Game information

First quarter

- (9:40) SYR Walter Reyes 50 yard run (Brendan Carney kick), (Drive 1 play, 50 yards, 0:08; 7-0 Syracuse)
- (3:28) CONN Dan Murray 17 yard pass from Dan Orlovsky (Matt Nuzie kick), (13 plays, 79 yards, 7:25; 7-7 Tied)

Second quarter

- (7:29) CONN Cornell Brockington 2 yard run (kick failed), (Drive 9 plays, 74 yards, 2:40; 13-7 Connecticut)
- (5:49) SYR Breyone Evans 22 yard run (Brendan Carney kick), (Drive 3 plays, 75 yards, 0:50; 14-13 Syracuse)
- (4:07) CONN Brian Sparks 20 yard pass from Dan Orlovsky (Matt Nuzie kick), (Drive 5 plays, 80 yards, 0:54; 20-14 Connecticut)
- (0:04) SYR Andre Fontenette 36 yard pass from Perry Patterson (Brendan Carney kick), 6 plays, 43 yards, 0:44; 21-20 Syracuse)

Third quarter

- (10:51) SYR Anthony Smith 32 yard interception return (Brendan Carney kick), (28-20 Syracuse)
- (5:27) CONN Matt Nuzie 48 yard field goal, (Drive 10 plays, 52 yards, 2:50; 28-23 Syracuse)
- (0:34) SYR Jared Jones 29 yard pass from Perry Patterson (Brendan Carney kick), (Drive 10 plays, 82 yards, 6:05; 35-23 Syracuse)

Fourth quarter

- (7:39) SYR Walter Reyes 3 yard run (Brendan Carney kick), (Drive 4 plays, 63 yards, 1:00; 42-23 Syracuse)
- (0:52) CONN Brandon McLean 15 yard pass from Dan Orlovsky (Matt Nuzie kick) (Drive 11 plays, 70 yards, 2:20; 42-30 Syracuse)

Statistics	CONN	SYR
First downs	35	18
Total yards	566	406
Rushing yards	121	281
Passing yards	445	125
Turnovers	5	0
Penalties–yards	10-73	8-75

Team	Category	Player	Statistics
Connecticut	Passing	Dan Orlovsky	39/51, 445 yards, 3 TDs, 2 INTs
Connecticut	Rushing	Cornell Brockington	24 carries, 123 yards, 1 TD
Connecticut	Receiving	Keron Henry	5 receptions, 109 yards
Syracuse	Passing	Perry Patterson	11/19, 125 yards, 2 TDs
Syracuse	Rushing	Walter Reyes	15 carries, 121 yards, 2 TDs
Syracuse	Receiving	Steve Gregory	6 receptions, 53 yards

=== At Georgia Tech ===
Connecticut Huskies at Georgia Tech Yellow Jackets – Game summary

Quarter	1	2	3	4	Total
Huskies	3	0	0	7	10
Yellow Jackets	7	13	3	7	30

at Bobby Dodd Stadium, Atlanta, Georgia

- Date: November 13
- Game time: 1:00 p.m. EST
- Game attendance: 43,577

Game information

First quarter

- (11:59) GT Jimmy Dixon 4 yard pass from Reggie Ball (Travis Bell kick), (Drive 7 plays, 80 yards, 2:59; 7-0 Georgia Tech)
- (8:47) CONN Matt Nuzie 51 yard field goal, (Drive 8 plays, 29 yards, 1:06; 7-3 Georgia Tech)

Second quarter

- (3:02) GT Travis Bell 27 yard field goal, (Drive 12 plays, 81 yards, 5:36; 10-3 Georgia Tech)
- (2:13) GT Djay Jones 5 yard blocked punt return (Travis Bell kick), 17-3 Georgia Tech)
- (0:15) GT Travis Bell 34 yard field goal, (Drive 8 plays, 32 yards, 0:51; 20-3 Georgia Tech)

Third quarter

- (1:51) GT Travis Bell 29 yard field goal, (Drive 4 plays, 3 yards, 0:52; 23-3 Georgia Tech)

Fourth quarter

- (6:15) GT Ajenavi Eziemefe 3 yard pass from Reggie Ball (Travis Bell kick), (Drive 8 plays, 85 yards, 3:35; 30-3 Georgia Tech)
- (0:03) CONN Chris Bellamy 1 yard run (Matt Nuzie kick), (Drive 14 plays, 72 yards, 2:22; 30-10 Georgia Tech)

Statistics	CONN	GT
First downs	18	19
Total yards	225	410
Rushing yards	20	122
Passing yards	205	288
Turnovers	0	1
Penalties–yards	2-20	9-68

Team	Category	Player	Statistics
Connecticut	Passing	Dan Orlovsky	28/49, 205 yards
Connecticut	Rushing	Cornell Brockington	18 carries, 43 yards
Connecticut	Receiving	Keron Henry	6 receptions, 65 yards
Georgia Tech	Passing	Reggie Ball	22/38, 288 yards, 2 TDs
Georgia Tech	Rushing	Rashaun Grant	19 carries, 73 yards
Georgia Tech	Receiving	Calvin Johnson	6 receptions, 131 yards

=== Buffalo ===
Buffalo Bulls at Connecticut Huskies – Game summary

Quarter	1	2	3	4	Total
Bulls	0	0	0	0	0
Huskies	7	5	10	7	29

at Rentschler Field, East Hartford, Connecticut

- Date: November 20
- Game time: 12:00 p.m. EST
- Game attendance: 40,000

Game information

First quarter

- (10:38) CONN Cornell Brockington 7 yard run (Matt Nuzie kick), (Drive 10 plays, 70 yards, 3:25; 7-0 Connecticut)

Second quarter

- (11:08) CONN Matt Nuzie 26 yard field goal, (10-0 Connecticut)
- (5:19) CONN Shawn Mayne safety, (12-0 Connecticut)

Third quarter

- (10:20) CONN Matt Nuzie 39 yard field goal, (Drive 10 plays, 28 yards, 3:19; 15-0 Connecticut)
- (2:17) CONN Cornell Brockington 43 yard run (Matt Nuzie kick), (Drive 8 plays, 81 yards, 2:28; 22-0 Connecticut)

Fourth quarter

- (9:46) CONN Brandon McLean 33 yard pass from Dan Orlovsky (Matt Nuzie kick), (Drive 5 plays, 54 yards, 1:24; 29-0 Connecticut)

Statistics	BUF	CONN
First downs	5	11
Total yards	96	477
Rushing yards	61	192
Passing yards	35	285
Turnovers	1	0
Penalties–yards	8-65	7-55

Team	Category	Player	Statistics
Buffalo	Passing	P.J.Piskorik	3/18, 27 yards, 1 INT
Buffalo	Rushing	Chris McDuffie	8 carries, 37 yards
Buffalo	Receiving	Matt Knueven	1 reception, 12 yards
Connecticut	Passing	Dan Orlovsky	28/38, 283 yards, 1 TD
Connecticut	Rushing	Cornell Brockington	25 carries, 136 yards, 2 TDs
Connecticut	Receiving	Matt Cutaia	4 Receptions, 51 yards

=== At Rutgers ===
Connecticut Huskies at Rutgers Scarlet Knights – Game summary

Quarter	1	2	3	4	Total
Huskies	14	7	14	6	41
Scarlet Knights	7	14	7	7	35

at Rutgers Stadium, Piscataway, New Jersey

- Date: November 25
- Game time: 10:00 a.m. EST
- Game attendance: 20,224
- TV: ESPN2

Game information

First quarter

- (9:43) RUTG Brian Leonard 1 yard run (Jeremy Ito kick), (Drive 12 plays, 81 yards, 4:55; 7-0 Rutgers)
- (4:31) CONN Cornell Brockington 1 yard run (Matt Nuzie kick), (Drive 8 plays, 42 yards, 2:55; 7-7 Tied)
- (0:35) CONN Cornell Brockington 5 yard run (Matt Nuzie kick), (Drive 6 plays, 64 yards, 1:52; 14-7 Connecticut)

Second quarter

- (6:38) CONN Cornell Brockington 16 yard pass from Dan Orlovsky (Matt Nuzie kick), (Drive 10 plays, 55 yards, 3:09; 21-7 Connecticut)
- (6:07) RUTG Tres Moses 87 yard pass from Terrence Shawell (Jeremy Ito kick), (Drive 2 plays, 77 yards, 0:14; 21-14 Connecticut)
- (0:38) RUTG Marcus Daniels 13 yard pass from Ryan Hart (Jeremy Ito kick), (Drive 6 plays, 59 yards, 1:48; 21-21 Tied)

Third quarter

- (10:01) CONN Chris Bellamy 2 yard run (Matt Nuzie kick), (Drive 12 plays, 81 yards, 4:37; 28-21 Connecticut)
- (7:14) RUTG Tres Moses 16 yard pass from Ryan Hart (Jeremy Ito kick), (Drive 7 plays, 76 yards, 2:27; 28-28 Tied)
- (6:08) CONN Dan Murray 32 yard pass from Dan Orlovsky (Matt Nuzie kick), (Drive 2 plays, 52 yards, 0:50; 35-28 Connecticut)

Fourth quarter

- (2:28) CONN Dan Murray 3 yard pass from Dan Orlovsky (kick failed), (Drive 10 plays, 80 yards, 4:11; 41-28 Connecticut)
- (2:14) RUTG Willie Foster 80 yard kickoff return (Jeremy Ito kick), (41-35 Connecticut)

Statistics	CONN	RUTG
First downs	26	24
Total yards	487	454
Rushing yards	223	88
Passing yards	264	366
Turnovers	2	2
Penalties–yards	6-55	4-44

Team	Category	Player	Statistics
Connecticut	Passing	Dan Orlovsky	19/30, 264 yards, 3 TDs, 2 INTs
Connecticut	Rushing	Cornell Brockington	17 carries, 73 yards, 2 TDs
Connecticut	Receiving	Dan Murray	6 Receptions, 135 yards, 2 TDs
Rutgers	Passing	Ryan Hart	26/34, 279 yards, 2 TDs
Rutgers	Rushing	Brian Leonard	20 carries, 70 yards, 1 TD
Rutgers	Receiving	Tres Moses	7 receptions, 168 yards, 2 TDs

=== Vs. Toledo—Motor City Bowl ===
Connecticut Huskies vs. Toldeo Rockets (Motor City Bowl) – Game summary

Quarter	1	2	3	4	Total
Huskies	17	13	3	6	39
Rockets	0	7	3	0	10

at Ford Field, Detroit, Michigan

- Date: December 27
- Game time: 5:30 p.m. EST
- Game weather: None (played indoors)
- Game attendance: 52,552
- Referee: Cooper Castleberry
- TV: ESPN2

Game information
First quarter
- CONN – Matt Nuzie 35-yard field goal, 12:05. Huskies 3–0. Drive: 7 plays, 41 yards, 2:55.
- CONN – Jason Williams 32-yard pass from Dan Orlovsky (Matt Nuzie kick), 4:41. Huskies 10–0. Drive: 5 plays, 36 yards, 1:43.
- CONN – Larry Taylor 68-yard punt return (Matt Nuzie kick), 2:31. Huskies 17–0.

Second quarter

- TOL – Bruce Gradkowski 1-yard run (Jason Robbins kick), 10:53. Huskies 17–7. Drive: 10 plays, 63 yards, 6:27.
- CONN – Brian Sparks 7-yard pass from Dan Orlovsky (Matt Nuzie kick), 7:42. Huskies 24–7. Drive: 9 plays, 41 yards, 3:11.
- CONN – Matt Nuzie 37-yard field goal, 1:24. Huskies 27–7. Drive: 11 plays, 55 yards, 3:23.
- CONN – Matt Nuzie 25-yard field goal, 0:00. Huskies 30–7. Drive: 6 plays, 53 yards, 0:55.

Third quarter

- TOL – Jason Robbins 27-yard field goal, 11:47. Huskies 30–10. Drive: 9 plays, 56 yards, 3:13.
- CONN – Matt Nuzie 36-yard field goal, 1:53. Huskies 33–10. Drive: 12 plays, 65 yards, 5:58.

Fourth quarter

- CONN – Matt Lawrence 11-yard run (kick blocked), 0:25. Huskies 39–10. Drive: 5 plays, 45 yards, 2:52.

Statistics	CONN	TOL
First downs	20	20
Total yards	398	281
Rushing yards	159	78
Passing yards	239	203
Turnovers	1	3
Time of possession	28:18	31:42

Team	Category	Player	Statistics
Connecticut	Passing	Dan Orlovsky	20/41, 239 yards, 2 TD, INT
Connecticut	Rushing	Cornell Brockington	15 rushes, 72 yards
Connecticut	Receiving	Keron Henry	9 receptions, 109 yards
Toledo	Passing	Marques Council	16/28, 160 yards, 2 INT
Toledo	Rushing	Trinity Dawson	19 rushes, 78 yards
Toledo	Receiving	Chris Holmes	4 receptions, 47 yards

== Roster ==
2004 UConn Huskies football team roster
Players
Coaches
Offense

Pos.	#	Name	Class
WR	1	Keron Henry	Sr
WR	3	Dan Desriveaux	So
FB	5	Lou Allen	Fr
QB	7	Dan Orlovsky	Sr
FB	8	Sam Dorvil	So
QB	13	Shane Fogarty	So
QB	14	Peter Harten	So
QB	15	D. J. Hernandez	Fr
QB	16	Matt Bonislawski	So
WR	17	Matt Cutaia	Sr
QB	19	Mark Punzelt	Fr
RB	24	Larry Taylor	Fr
FB	30	Deon Anderson	Jr
RB	31	Jon Wholley	Sr
RB	33	Cornell Brockington	So
RB	34	Chris Bellamy	Sr
RB	42	Matt Lawrence	So
RB	44	Terry Caulley	Jr
TE	46	Dan Murray	So
G	54	Brian Markowski	Sr
C	56	Jeff Fox	Sr
C	58	Billy Irwin	Sr
G	60	Ken Rice	Sr
G	61	Immanuel Hutcherson	Fr
G	62	T.J. Dlubac	Sr
OT	64	Will Beatty	Fr
OT	67	Pat Shortell	Fr
C	69	Trey Tonsing	Fr
OT	70	Aloys Manga	So
OT	71	Matt Wood	Fr
G	72	Craig Berry	So
OT	73	Ryan Krug	Sr
OT	74	Michael Kodish	Sr
G	75	Brian Kersmanc	Fr
OT	77	Brendan Borowski	Sr
OT	78	Grant Preston	Jr
WR	80	Jason Williams	Jr
WR	81	Nollis Dewar	Fr
WR	82	Seth Fogarty	Fr
WR	83	Brandon Young	Jr
WR	84	Matt D'Agata	Fr
WR	84	Brian Sparks	Sr
WR	85	David Sanchez	So
WR	85	Aaron Smith	Jr
WR	87	Ellis Gaulden	Fr
WR	88	Brandon McLean	Fr
TE	89	Ziggy Goryn	So
TE	90	Steve Brouse	Fr
TE	91	Tim Lassen	Sr
TE	95	Matt Gray	Fr

Defense

Pos.	#	Name	Class
CB	2	Justin Perkins	Sr
DE	4	Harold Stanback	Fr
DE	6	Daniel Davis	Fr
LB	9	Alfred Fincher	Sr
FS	10	Marvin Taylor	Fr
LB	11	Maurice Lloyd	Sr
SS	12	John Fletcher	Sr
LB	14	Justin Derubertis	Fr
SS	15	Donnell Ford	Fr
SS	18	Quanear Gaskins	Sr
LB	20	Kinnan Herriott	Sr
FS	21	Donta Moore	So
LB	22	Johnathon Smith	Fr
CB	26	Allan Barnes	So
CB	27	Jahi Smith	So
CB	28	Darius Butler	Fr
FS	29	Tyvon Branch	Fr
DE	29	Bernie Huzar	So
LB	32	James Hargrave	Jr
FS	35	M. J. Estep	So
SS	36	Dahna Deleston	Fr
CB	38	Ricky McCollum	Fr
LB	39	Robert Theoudele	Fr
DE	40	Shawn Mayne	So
CB	41	Ernest Cole	So
LB	43	Ryan Henegan	Fr
LB	45	Julius Williams	Fr
LB	47	Taurien Sowell	Jr
LB	48	Danny Lansanah	Fr
DE	52	Tyler King	Sr
DT	53	Ray Blagman	So
DT	55	Donald Thomas	Fr
DT	57	Matt Applebaum	So
DE	59	Jason Ward	So
DT	63	Afa Anoai	Fr
DT	65	Rob Lunn	Fr
DE	68	Keith Gray	Fr
DT	76	Deon McPhee	Jr
DE	92	John Baranowsky	Fr
DT	93	Rhema Fuller	So
DE	96	Gary Mack	Fr
DE	99	Nate Tucker	Fr

Special teams

Pos.	#	Name	Class
P	6	Chris Pavasaris	Fr
P	37	Shane Hussar	Fr
K	94	Graig Vicidomino	So
K	95	Derek Marks	Fr
K	97	Tony Ciaravino	Fr
K	98	Matt Nuzie	So

Head coach

- Randy Edsall

Coordinators/assistant coaches

- Norries Wilson
  Offensive coordinator
- Hank Hughes
  Defensive coordinator

Legend

- (C) Team captain
- (S) Suspended
- (I) Ineligible
- Injured
- Redshirt

Roster
Last update: May 18, 2024

== After the season ==
=== NFL draft ===
The following Huskies were selected in the 2005 NFL draft following the season.

Round	Pick	Player	Position	NFL club
3	82	Alfred Fincher	Linebacker	New Orleans Saints
5	145	Dan Orlovsky	Quarterback	Detroit Lions
