= 2004 All-Big East Conference football team =

American college football all-star team

The 2004 All-Big East Conference football team consists of American football players from the Big East Conference who were chosen as the best at their respective positions during the 2004 NCAA Division I-A football season. The organizations selecting All-Big East teams in 2004 included the conference's head football coaches. The coaches chose both first- and second-team players.

West Virginia. The West Virginia Mountaineers finished in a four-way tie for the 2004 Big East championship and placed nine players on the first team, including quarterback Rasheed Marshall, wide receiver Chris Henry, offensive lineman Dan Mozes, cornerback and return specialist Adam Jones, and safety Jahmile Addae. Marshall was named Big East offensive player of the year, and Jones was selected as the conference's special teams player of the year.

Pittsburgh. The Pittsburgh Panthers (No. 25 in the final AP poll) also tied for the conference championship and placed five players on the All-Big East first team: offensive tackle Rob Petitti, defensive lineman Vince Crochunis, linebacker H. B. Blades, kicker Josh Cummings, and punter Adam Graessle. Five others, including quarterback Tyler Palko and wide receiver Greg Lee, were named to the second team. In addition, Walt Harris was named Big East Coach of the year.

Syracuse. The Syracuse Orange (No. 21 in the final AP poll) tied for the conference championship and placed four players on the first team: senior running back and team captain Walter Reyes (800 rushing yards), senior offensive tackle Adam Terry, senior center Matt Tarullo, and senior safety Diamond Ferri. Four others were named to the second team.

Boston College. The Boston College Eagles tied for the conference championship and placed only one player, defensive lineman Mathias Kiwanuka, on the first team. Kiwanuka was also selected as the Big East defensive player of the year. Seven Boston College players, including cornerback and return specialist Will Blackmon, were named to the second team. Linebacker Brian Toal was selected as the Big East rookie of the year.

Connecticut. The UConn Huskies placed three players on the first team: running back Cornell Brockington (1,800 rushing yards), linebackerAlfred Fincher, and cornerback Justin Perkins.

Rutgers. Despite finishing in a tie for last place, Rutgers placed four players on the first team: fullback Brian Leonard, wide receiver Tres Moses, tight end Clark Harris, and defensive end Ryan Neill. Moses was the first Rutgers player with 1,000 receiving yards and set a conference record with an average of 7.6 receptions per game. Harris ranked second nationally among tight ends with 53 catches and 753 receiving yards. Offensive lineman John Glass was named to the second team.

Temple. Junior linebacker Rian "Goo" Wallace was Temple's sole representative on the first team. Two other Temple players were named to the second team.

== Offensive selections ==
=== Quarterbacks ===
- Rasheed Marshall, West Virginia (Coaches-1)
- Tyler Palko, Pitt (Coaches-2).
- Walter Washington, Temple (Coaches-2)

=== Running backs ===
- Cornell Brockington, UConn (Coaches-1)
- Brian Leonard, Rutgers (Coaches-1)
- Walter Reyes, Syracuse (Coaches-1)
- Damien Rhodes, Syracuse (Coaches-2)
- Kay-Jay Harris, West Virginia (Coaches-2)

=== Wide receivers ===
- Tres Moses, Rutgers (Coaches-1)
- Chris Henry, West Virginia (Coaches-1)
- Greg Lee, Pitt (Coaches-2)
- Grant Adams, Boston College (Coaches-2)

=== Tight ends ===
- Clark Harris, Rutgers (Coaches-1)
- David Kashetta, Boston College (Coaches-2)

=== Offensive tackles ===
- Rob Petitti, Pitt (Coaches-1)
- Adam Terry, Syracuse (Coaches-1)
- Ryan Krug, UConn (Coaches-2)
- Jeremy Trueblood, Boston College (Coaches-2)
- Michael Watson, West Virginia (Coaches-2)

=== Offensive guard ===
- Dan Mozes, West Virginia (Coaches-1)
- Jeff Berk, West Virginia (Coaches-1)
- John Glass, Rutgers (Coaches-2)
- Charles Spencer, Pitt (Coaches-2)

=== Centers ===
- Matt Tarullo, Syracuse (Coaches-1)
- Tim Brown, West Virginia (Coaches-1)
- Pat Ross, Boston College (Coaches-2)

== Defensive selections ==
=== Defensive line ===
- Mathias Kiwanuka, Boston College (Coaches-1)
- Ben Lynch, West Virginia (Coaches-1)
- Ryan Neill, Rutgers (Coaches-1)
- Vince Crochunis, Pitt (Coaches-1)
- James Wyche, Syracuse (Coaches-2)
- Mike Mendenhall, Temple (Coaches-2)
- Tim Bulman, Boston College (Coaches-2)
- Dan Stephens, Pitt (Coaches-2)

=== Linebackers ===
- Rian Wallace, Temple (Coaches-1)
- Alfred Fincher, UConn (Coaches-1)
- H. B. Blades, Pitt (Coaches-1)
- Ray Henderson, Boston College (Coaches-2)
- Maurice Lloyd, UConn (Coaches-2)
- Adam Lehnortt, West Virginia (Coaches-2)

=== Cornerbacks ===
- Adam Jones, West Virginia (Coaches-1)
- Justin Perkins, UConn (Coaches-1)
- Bernard "Josh" Lay, Pitt (Coaches-2)
- Will Blackmon, Boston College (Coaches-2)

=== Safeties ===
- Diamond Ferri, Syracuse (Coaches-1)
- Jahmile Addae, West Virginia (Coaches-1)
- Anthony Smith, Syracuse (Coaches-2)
- Mike Lorello, West Virginia (Coaches-2)

== Special teams ==
=== Kickers ===
- Josh Cummings, Pitt (Coaches-1)
- Matt Nuzzle, UConn (Coaches-2)

=== Punters ===
- Adam Graessle, Pitt (Coaches-1)
- Brendan Carney, Syracuse (Coaches-2)

=== Return specialist ===
- Adam Jones, West Virginia (Coaches-1)
- Will Blackmon, Boston College (Coaches-2)

== Individual awards ==
- Offensive player of the year - Rasheed Marshall, West Virginia
- Defensive player of the year - Mathias Kiwanuka, Boston College
- Special teams player of the year - Adam Jones, West Virginia
- Rookie of the year - Brian Toal, linebacker, Boston College
- Coach of the year - Walt Harris, Pitt

== Key ==
Coaches, selected by the conference coaches

== See also ==
- 2004 All-America college football team
