= 2004 Motor City Bowl =

Connecticut Huskies	Toledo Rockets
(7–4)	(9–3)
Big East	MAC
39	10
Head coach: Randy Edsall	Head coach: Tom Amstutz
	1	2	3	4	Total
Connecticut	17	13	3	6	39
Toledo	0	7	3	0	10
- Date: December 27, 2004
- Season: 2004
- Stadium: Ford Field
- Location: Detroit, Michigan
- MVP: Dan Orlovsky (Connecticut)
- Favorite: Toledo by 3
- Referee: Cooper Castleberry (Big XII)
- Attendance: 52,552

United States TV coverage
- Network: ESPN

The 2004 Motor City Bowl, part of the 2004–05 NCAA football bowl games season, occurred on December 27, 2004, at Ford Field in Detroit, Michigan.

== Team selection ==
The Toledo Rockets entered the game as the champions of the Mid-American Conference as they defeated Miami University on December 2, 2004, in the MAC Championship Game by a score of 35–27. This was Toledo's third trip to the bowl. They also appeared in 2001 and 2002. The Connecticut Huskies qualified for their first ever bowl appearance by finishing 7–4 and had a Big East Conference record of 3–3. Connecticut was invited to the game when the Big Ten could not provide a qualifying team.

== Game summary ==
The announced attendance of 52,552 was, at the time, a record crowd for the Motor City Bowl. It has since been surpassed by both the 2006 and 2007 games.

=== First quarter ===
Larry Taylor received the opening kickoff for UConn at the eight-yard line and returned the ball 34 yards to the Connecticut 42-yard line. Behind the passing of quarterback Dan Orlovsky and the running of Cornell Brockington, the Huskies moved down the field, earning three first downs. The drive stalled at the Toledo 17-yard line; Matt Nuzie came on to successfully kick a 35-yard field goal. UConn took an early 3–0 lead, with 11:55 left in the first quarter.

Toledo received the ensuing kickoff, but lost yardage on the return and had to start their opening drive from their own eight-yard line. On their first offensive play they promptly earned their first first down of the game, on a 12-yard pass from quarterback Bruce Gradkowski to wide receiver Kenny Higgins. After being stopped for no gain on the next play, running back Trinity Dawson uncorked a 22-yard run on second down to earn Toledo's second first down of the drive. The Rockets were unable to progress further, however, and punted the ball to the Huskies, who likewise were unable to advance. Toledo received the Connecticut punt but could not earn a first down on three plays. On 4th-and-4 on their own 45-yard line, the Rockets faked the punt attempt and attempted to earn a first down, but fumbled the ball; Connecticut's Tyler King recovered. The Huskies made Toledo pay for their mistake. After three plays earned only four yards, UConn went for it on fourth down. Dan Orlovsky connected with wide receiver Jason Williams for 32 yards and a touchdown. After Nuzie kicked the extra-point, the Connecticut lead was extended to 10–0, with 4:36 left in the first quarter.

The Rockets started their next drive from their own 27-yard line. Two plays netted Toledo five yards, which were promptly lost on a penalty, setting up a 3rd-and-10. Gradkowski's pass was incomplete, forcing the Rockets to punt. Toledo's punt was caught by UConn's Larry Taylor, who ran down the right sideline 68 yards, all the way for a touchdown. After the extra point, the Huskies now had a 17–0 lead. UConn's 17 points were a Motor City Bowl-record for most points scored in a first quarter.

The Rockets got the ball back on their own 31-yard line, and moved down the field on runs by Trinity Dawson, aided by a 15-yard penalty on the Huskies on third down. Dawson's 11-yard run up the middle on 2nd-and-6 set up a 1st-and-10 on the UConn 28-yard line as the first quarter clock expired. At the end of the first quarter, Connecticut held a 17–0 lead.

=== Second quarter ===
Toledo continued their drive down the field as the second quarter began. Twice UConn had a chance to stop the Rockets, forcing them into second- or third-and-long scenarios. Twice Toledo converted the first down, the first time on a 14-yard run by Trinity Dawson, the second time on a 16-yard pass from Gradkowski to tight end Chris Holmes, setting up a 1st-and-goal on the Connecticut 4. On first down Dawson gained three yards; on second down Gradkowski kept the ball himself but was stopped for no gain. Gradkowski tried again on third down, and this time punched the ball in for the touchdown. After the extra point, the Rockets now trailed the Huskies, 17–7.

Connecticut promptly responded on their next drive. They began in Toledo territory, after a 54-yard kickoff return by Larry Taylor. After two Cornell Brockington runs and a five-yard penalty against the Huskies set up 3rd-and-2, Orlovsky connected with wide receiver Jason Williams for four yards and the first down. After another Brockington run, Orlovsky and Williams would connect again for a first down, this time gaining five yards. On the next play Orlovsky completed a pass to Brandon LcLean for 11 yards and another first down, moving the ball to the Toledo 7-yard line. After one incompletion, Orlovsky threw over the middle to Brian Sparks, scoring the touchdown. The extra point was good; Connecticut now held a 24–7 lead over Toledo.

The Rockets started their next drive from their own 22-yard line. Gradkowski connected with Chris Holmes for 15 yards and a first down, but after that the drive stalled after a sack and a penalty drove Toledo back to their own 29-yard line and set up 3rd-and-15. Trinity Dawson's 10-yard run still left the Rockets five yards short of the first down; Toledo punted. Connecticut took over on their own 26-yard line and used a variety of players to move down the field; fullback Deon Anderson and wide receiver Jason Williams carried for three and 16 yards respectively to move the Huskies to midfield. On 3rd-and-5 from the 50-yard line, Orlovsky connected with wide receiver Matt Cutaia for six yards and the first down. After a seven-yard run by running back Chris Bellamy and a fifteen-yard penalty on the Rockets moved the ball to the Toledo 22-yard line, UConn found themselves unable to advance further. A 37-yard field goal by Matt Nuzie gave the Huskies three more points; their lead was now 27–7 over the Rockets with less than two minutes left in the half.

Toledo started their next drive from their own 20-yard line, but went three-and-out after two incomplete passes by Gradkowski and a five-yard run by Dawson, well-short of the required ten yards. After the punt UConn took over on their own 40-yard line with just over a minute left in the half. Orlovsky completed a pass to Keron Henry for eight yards on first down; after an incompletion, Brockington ran up the middle for four yards and the first down, moving the ball into Toledo territory. On the next play, Orlovsky completed a long 41-yard pass to Matt Cutaia to the Toledo seven-yard line. Orlovsky threw incomplete on the next play; as time was running out, Connecticut elected to kick the field goal rather than risk not scoring any points. Matt Nuzie's 25-yard attempt was good as the halftime clock expired. With one half complete, the Huskies now held a 30–7 lead in a game that was rapidly becoming a blowout.

=== Third quarter ===
Toledo took possession of the ball at the 35-yard line as the third quarter began. New quarterback Marques Council, who replaced the injured Bruce Gradkowski at halftime, led the Rockets down the field, running for 13 yards and a first down and then completing a 29-yard pass to Lance Moore for another first down. Toledo had a 1st-and-goal at the Connecticut 6, but after two rushing plays were stopped for a loss, and an incomplete pass, the Rockets were forced to settle for a 27-yard field goal. The UConn lead was cut to 30–10 just three minutes into the third quarter.

Connecticut went three-and-out on the ensuing possession, punting the ball back to Toledo. Marques Council continued to give the Rockets new life, leading them to three first downs as they moved down the field into Connecticut territory. On 2nd-and-8 from the UConn 22, Council made his first mistake, throwing a pass over the middle that was intercepted by linebacker Alfred Fincher. The Huskies took advantage of the turnover to advance down the field on a mix of running plays by Cornell Brockington, Chris Bellamy, and Deon Anderson, and passes from Orlovsky to Keron Henry and Dan Murray. The drive advanced as far as the Toledo 20-yard line, where Connecticut was stopped. Matt Nuzie was called on once again for the field goal; he successfully kicked the 36-yarder, giving him a Motor City Bowl-record four made field goals. The UConn lead was back to 23 points with less than two minutes left in the third quarter. Toledo started their next drive on their own 20-yard line but went three-and-out; their punt, downed by Connecticut at their own 42-yard line, was the final play of the quarter. At the end of three quarters, the Huskies held a 33–10 lead over the Rockets.

=== Fourth quarter ===
On the first play of the fourth quarter, Dan Orlovsky completed a 44-yard pass to Keron Henry, moving the Huskies to the Toledo 14-yard line. A loss of two on a run by Chris Bellamy and two incomplete passes halted the UConn drive; Matt Nuzie was called on to attempt his fifth field goal of the game. This time, however, Nuzie missed the kick, a 34-yard attempt, keeping the score 33–10 and giving possession back to the Rockets.

Taking over on their own 16-yard line, Toledo promptly earned two first downs on passes from Council to Lance Moore for 16 yards and to Chris Holmes for 11, moving the Rockets to midfield. On 1st-and-10 from the 50-yard line, however, Council threw a pass that was intercepted by UConn's Justin Perkins. The Huskies got to the Toledo 39-yard line on a pass from Orlovsky to Keron Henry, but after two incompletions Orlovsky threw an interception to Toledo's Nigel Morris. The Rockets took over with 11:13 left in the game, and led by Marques Council drove down the field as far as the Connecticut 28-yard line. A sack, incomplete pass, and completion from Council to Trinity Dawson for five yards set up a 4th-and-7 from the UConn 25-yard line. The Rockets elected to go for the first down, but Council was sacked, causing Toledo to turn the ball back over on downs. After a three-and-out and punt by the Huskies, the Rockets got the ball back on their own 34-yard line. Council was sacked again, this time for a loss of 16 yards, and on the next play fumbled. Fortunately for him he recovered his own fumble, but the Rockets were unable to get close to first-down yardage and were forced to punt. With 3:17 left in the game, UConn elected to keep the ball on the ground. On 2nd-and-10 from the Toledo 45-yard line, Chris Bellamy ran left for 32 yards. Three plays later, on 3rd-and-8 from the Rocket 11-yard line, Connecticut running back Matt Lawrence ran by the middle for the final touchdown of the game. The extra point was blocked by Toledo; after one complete pass from Council to Quinton Broussard for eleven yards and a first down, two incomplete passes, and a sack, the game was over. UConn won the game 39–10.

=== Scoring summary ===
Scoring summary

Quarter	Time	Drive			Team	Scoring information	Score	
Quarter	Time	Plays	Yards	TOP	Team	Scoring information	UCONN	TOL
1	12:05	7	41	2:55	UCONN	35-yard field goal by Matt Nuzie	3	0
1	04:41	5	36	1:43	UCONN	Jason Williams 32-yard touchdown reception from Dan Orlovsky, Matt Nuzie kick good	10	0
1	02:31	0	68	0:00	UCONN	Larry Taylor 68-yard touchdown punt return touchdown, Matt Nuzie kick good	17	0
2	10:53	10	63	6:27	TOL	Bruce Gradkowski 1-yard touchdown run, Jason Robbins kick good	17	7
2	07:42	9	41	3:11	UCONN	Brian Sparks 7-yard touchdown reception from Dan Orlovsky, Matt Nuzie kick good	24	7
2	01:24	11	55	3:23	UCONN	37-yard field goal by Matt Nuzie	27	7
2	00:00	6	53	0:55	UCONN	25-yard field goal by Matt Nuzie	30	7
3	11:47	9	56	3:13	TOL	27-yard field goal by Jason Robbins	30	10
3	01:53	12	65	5:58	UCONN	36-yard field goal by Matt Nuzie	33	10
4	00:25	5	45	2:52	UCONN	Matt Lawrence 11-yard touchdown run, Matt Nuzie kick blocked	39	10
"TOP" = time of possession. For other American football terms, see Glossary of American football.							39	10

== Final statistics ==
Statistical comparison
	Toledo	UConn
1st downs	20	20
Total yards	281	398
Passing yards	203	239
Rushing yards	78	159
Penalties	4–35	5–44
3rd down conversions	8–18	8–17
4th down conversions	0–2	1–1
Turnovers	3	1
Time of possession	31:42	28:18

Dan Orlovsky was named the game's MVP by completing 21 of his 40 passes for 239 yards and two touchdowns. Tyler King, playing in his first game since breaking his leg in the Huskies 29–17 win over Pittsburgh on September 30, was awarded the United Auto Workers Lineman of the Game Award.

== Aftermath ==
In the late summer of 2007, ESPN reported that the Toledo football team, and specifically running back Harvey "Scooter" McDougle was under federal investigation for a point shaving scandal. The 2004 Motor City Bowl was one of the games in question.
