= Colonial Clash =

American college football rivalry

- UMass New Hampshire
- Sport: College football
- Location: Massachusetts, United States
- First meeting: UMass 10–4 UNH (1897)
- Latest meeting: UNH 27–21 UMass (2011)
- Next meeting: (None scheduled)

Statistics
- Total meetings: 74
- All-time series: UMass leads, 43–28–3
- Trophy series: Bill Knight Trophy
- Largest victory: UNH 56–7 UMass (1921)
- Longest win streak: UMass, 6 (1969–74, 1977–82)
- Longest unbeaten streak: 4 (1953–56, 1994–97)
- Current win streak: New Hampshire, 2

Locations of UMASS and UNH

The Colonial Clash was an annual college football rivalry game played between the University of Massachusetts Amherst (UMass) and the University of New Hampshire (UNH). The two teams first played each other in 1897, and met annually from 1952 through 2011. The rivalry was branded as the Colonial Clash beginning in 2010. However, the new branding didn't last for long. In 2012, UMass transitioned to the Football Bowl Subdivision (FBS) of NCAA Division I, discontinuing the rivalry. In 74 meetings, UMass has won 43 games, UNH has won 28 games, and there have been three ties. Beginning with the 1986 meeting, the MVP of the game was awarded the Bill Knight Trophy.

== History ==
The first game played between the two schools took place on October 2, 1897, in Amherst, Massachusetts. Massachusetts won the game by a score of 10–4. At the time, UMass was known as Massachusetts Agricultural College and New Hampshire was officially New Hampshire College of Agriculture and the Mechanic Arts. They had formed a loose association with other public colleges in New England such as present day UConn and Rhode Island for the purpose of scheduling football matchups between the schools.

The colleges continued to schedule matches intermittently through 1922, but then had a 30-year hiatus until next meeting in 1952. They then met annually through the 2011 season, along with one playoff game as part of the 2006 postseason.

In August 2010, the matchup was branded as the "Colonial Clash", coincident with an arrangement to have the game played at Gillette Stadium in Foxborough, Massachusetts, during the 2010 and 2011 seasons. The 2010 matchup, a 39–13 win by New Hampshire, was the first college football game played at Gillette, the home stadium of the NFL's New England Patriots. The 2011 game, the second (and to date, most recent) playing under the Colonial Clash branding, was also won by UNH, 27–21.

UMass leads the all-time series, 43–27–3, a winning percentage of .610, although UNH has the edge in games played since 1990, 14–9. From 1958 through 1989, UMass won 26 of the meetings, losing only six times, including only one instance of back-to-back losses to their rival (1975 and 1976). The most successful run for New Hampshire occurred from 1990 to 2002, when the Wildcats won 10 matchups and lost only three.

In 2012, UMass moved up to the Football Bowl Subdivision (FBS), the NCAA's highest level of college football. The Minutemen joined the Mid-American Conference (MAC) at that time, then in 2016 became an independent. UNH remained in the Colonial Athletic Association (CAA) of the Football Championship Subdivision (FCS). No meetings between the programs have been scheduled since 2011, leaving the future of the rivalry in doubt.

== Game results ==
Massachusetts victories	New Hampshire victories	Tie games

No.	Date	Location	Winner	Score
1	October 2, 1897	Amherst, MA	Massachusetts	10–4
2	October 14, 1905	Amherst, MA	Massachusetts	15–0
3	October 6, 1906	Amherst, MA	Tie	0–0
4	November 7, 1908	Manchester, NH	Massachusetts	13–9
5	November 6, 1909	Manchester, NH	New Hampshire	17–0
6	October 29, 1910	Manchester, NH	Tie	0–0
7	November 4, 1911	Manchester, NH	Massachusetts	8–0
8	November 9, 1912	Manchester, NH	Massachusetts	21–3
9	November 8, 1913	Manchester, NH	Massachusetts	34–0
10	November 1, 1919	Durham, NH	New Hampshire	9–7
11	October 30, 1920	Amherst, MA	New Hampshire	9–0
12	November 12, 1921	Durham, NH	New Hampshire	56–7
13	October 28, 1922	Amherst, MA	Massachusetts	12–10
14	November 8, 1952	Amherst, MA	Massachusetts	26–13
15	November 21, 1953	Durham, NH	New Hampshire	32–12
16	November 6, 1954	Amherst, MA	New Hampshire	32–12
17	November 12, 1955	Durham, NH	New Hampshire	21–7
18	November 17, 1956	Amherst, MA	New Hampshire	28–7
19	November 16, 1957	Durham, NH	Tie	7–7
20	November 15, 1958	Amherst, MA	Massachusetts	25–24
21	November 14, 1959	Durham, NH	Massachusetts	19–6
22	November 12, 1960	Amherst, MA	Massachusetts	35–15
23	November 18, 1961	Durham, NH	Massachusetts	9–7
24	November 17, 1962	Amherst, MA	New Hampshire	16–14
25	November 16, 1963	Durham, NH	Massachusetts	48–2
26	November 14, 1964	Amherst, MA	Massachusetts	47–0
27	November 13, 1965	Durham, NH	Massachusetts	46–0
28	November 12, 1966	Amherst, MA	Massachusetts	14–7
29	November 18, 1967	Durham, NH	Massachusetts	14–13
30	November 16, 1968	Amherst, MA	New Hampshire	16–0
31	November 15, 1969	Durham, NH	Massachusetts	48–7
32	November 14, 1970	Amherst, MA	Massachusetts	24–14
33	November 13, 1971	Durham, NH	Massachusetts	38–20
34	November 18, 1972	Amherst, MA	Massachusetts	42–7
35	November 17, 1973	Durham, NH	Massachusetts	28–7
36	November 16, 1974	Amherst, MA	Massachusetts	27–17
37	November 15, 1975	Durham, NH	New Hampshire	14–11
38	November 13, 1976	Amherst, MA	New Hampshire	23–0

No.	Date	Location	Winner	Score
39	November 12, 1977	Durham, NH	Massachusetts	19–6
40	November 18, 1978	Amherst, MA	Massachusetts	34–0
41	November 17, 1979	Durham, NH	Massachusetts	29–0
42	November 15, 1980	Amherst, MA	Massachusetts	17–0
43	November 14, 1981	Durham, NH	Massachusetts	20–9
44	November 13, 1982	Amherst, MA	Massachusetts	27–0
45	November 12, 1983	Durham, NH	New Hampshire	35–10
46	November 17, 1984	Amherst, MA	Massachusetts	14–10
47	November 16, 1985	Durham, NH	Massachusetts	21–17
48	November 15, 1986	Amherst, MA	Massachusetts	38–31
49	November 14, 1987	Durham, NH	New Hampshire	17–10
50	November 19, 1988	Durham, NH	Massachusetts	64–42
51	November 18, 1989	Amherst, MA	Massachusetts	34–28
52	November 17, 1990	Durham, NH	New Hampshire	36–18
53	November 23, 1991	Amherst, MA	New Hampshire	35–28
54	November 21, 1992	Durham, NH	New Hampshire	20–13
55	November 20, 1993	Amherst, MA	Massachusetts	15–13
56	October 8, 1994	Durham, NH	New Hampshire	14–11
57	October 7, 1995	Amherst, MA	New Hampshire	32–29
58	October 26, 1996	Durham, NH	New Hampshire	40–7
59	October 4, 1997	Amherst, MA	New Hampshire	28–10
60	October 31, 1998	Durham, NH	Massachusetts	27–26
61	September 11, 1999	Amherst, MA	Massachusetts	34–19
62	October 28, 2000	Durham, NH	New Hampshire	24–16
63	October 13, 2001	Amherst, MA	New Hampshire	35–24
64	November 9, 2002	Durham, NH	New Hampshire	31–14
65	October 4, 2003	Amherst, MA	Massachusetts	44–30
66	October 16, 2004	Durham, NH	Massachusetts	38–21
67	October 29, 2005	Amherst, MA	New Hampshire	34–28
68	November 4, 2006	Durham, NH	Massachusetts	28–20
69	December 2, 2006 †	Amherst, MA	Massachusetts	24–17
70	November 10, 2007	Amherst, MA	Massachusetts	27–7
71	November 15, 2008	Durham, NH	New Hampshire	52–21
72	October 17, 2009	Amherst, MA	Massachusetts	23–17
73	October 23, 2010	Foxboro, MA	New Hampshire	39–13
74	October 22, 2011	Foxboro, MA	New Hampshire	27–21
Series: Massachusetts leads 43–28–3
† = NCAA FCS Playoffs

== Trophy ==
The Bill Knight Trophy is annually given to the Most Outstanding Player of the Colonial Clash. A new trophy is cast each year, therefore allowing the honoree to keep his award permanently.

=== History ===
The award is named after Bill Knight, long-time Sports Information Director at the University of New Hampshire, who died in November 1985. In addition to his duties at UNH, Knight was a past President of the New England Sports Information Directors Association, a member of the U.S. Olympic Committee at the 1984 Winter Games, and a recipient of the Irving T. Marsh ECAC Service Bureau Award. He also served as the Information Officer of the Yankee Conference. Knight was inducted into the University of New Hampshire 100 Club Hall of Fame on October 2, 1987. First awarded to Tim Bryant of UMass in 1986, the Bill Knight Trophy has been given to the most outstanding player of each playing of the Colonial Clash since then.

=== Recipients ===
Year	Winner	Position	Team	Result	Location
1986	Tim Bryant	QB	UMass	UMass, 38–31	Amherst, MA
1987	Bob Jean	QB	UNH	UNH, 17–10	Durham, NH
1988	Dave Palazzi	QB	UMass	UMass, 64–42	Durham, NH
1989	Gary Wilkos	QB	UMass	UMass, 34–28	Amherst, MA
1990	Matt Griffin	QB	UNH	UNH, 36–18	Durham, NH
1991	Matt Griffin	QB	UNH	UNH, 35–28	Amherst, MA
1992	Jim Stayer	QB	UNH	UNH, 20–13	Durham, NH
1993	John Johnson	FB	UMass	UMass, 15–13	Amherst, MA
1994	Mike Foley	DE	UNH	UNH, 14–11	Durham, NH
1995	Jerry Azumah	TB	UNH	UNH, 32–29	Amherst, MA
1996	Jerry Azumah	TB	UNH	UNH, 40–7	Durham, NH
1997	Jerry Azumah	TB	UNH	UNH, 28–10	Amherst, MA
1998	Marcel Shipp	TB	UMass	UMass, 27–26	Durham, NH
1999	Adrian Zullo	WR	UMass	UMass, 34–19	Amherst, MA
2000	Stephan Lewis	TB	UNH	UNH, 24–16	Durham, NH
2001	Stephan Lewis	TB	UNH	UNH, 35–24	Amherst, MA
2002	Stephan Lewis	TB	UNH	UNH, 31–14	Durham, NH
2003	Jason Peebler	WR	UMass	UMass, 44–30	Amherst, MA
2004	Steve Baylark	TB	UMass	UMass, 38–21	Durham, NH
2005	David Ball	WR	UNH	UNH, 34–28	Amherst, MA
2006	Jason Hatchell	DE	UMass	UMass, 28–20	Durham, NH
2007	Matt Lawrence	TB	UMass	UMass, 27–7	Amherst, MA
2008	Matt Parent	LB	UNH	UNH, 52–21	Durham, NH
2009	Jon Hernandez	TB	UMass	UMass, 23–17	Amherst, MA
2010	Matt Evans	LB	UNH	UNH, 39–13	Foxboro, MA
2011	Dontra Peters	TB	UNH	UNH, 27–21	Foxboro, MA

=== Notes ===
- Quarterbacks won the first seven awards. No quarterback has won since.
- No player from the losing team has been awarded the trophy.
- Four Bill Knight Trophy winners have gone on to play in the NFL: Jerry Azumah, Marcel Shipp, Steve Baylark, and Matt Lawrence.

== See also ==
- List of NCAA college football rivalry games
