= Tom Anthony (American football) =

American football coach (born 1982)

Biographical details
- Born: October 14, 1982 (age 44); Bettendorf, Iowa, U.S.
- Education: Augustana College (2005); University of St. Francis (2009)

Playing career
- 2001: Iowa State
- 2002–2005: Augustana (IL)
- 2006: New York Dragons
- 2006: Albany Conquest
- 2007: Quad City Steamwheelers
- Positions: Defensive back Wide receiver

Coaching career (HC unless noted)
- 2006: Augustana (IL) (DB)
- 2007: St. Francis (IL) (WR)
- 2008: Youngstown State (DL)
- 2009: Youngstown State (OLB)
- 2010: Miami (OH) (GA)
- 2011: Lake Erie (DC/DB)
- 2015–2016: Texas Southern (DC/DB)
- 2017–2019: Western Illinois (DC/OLB)
- 2020–2022: Pittsburg State (DC)
- 2024–2026: Pittsburg State

Head coaching record
- Overall: 22–13
- Tournaments: 1–2 (NCAA D-II playoffs)

Accomplishments and honors

Championships
- 1 MIAA (2025)

Thomas Anthony (born October 14, 1982) is an American college football coach, most recently serving as the head football coach for Pittsburg State University, a position he held from 2024 to 2026. He also coached for Augustana College, St. Francis, Youngstown State, Miami of Ohio, Lake Erie, Baldwin Wallace, St. Ambrose, Texas Southern, and Western Illinois. He played college football for Iowa State and Augustana College and professionally for the New York Dragons, Albany Conquest, and Quad City Steamwheelers of the Arena Football League (AFL).

== Personal life ==
Anthony's older brother, Chris, played professionally for the New York Dragons of the Arena Football League (AFL). Tom and his wife Kelsey have two kids Rebecca and Michael

== Head coaching record ==
Year	Team	Overall	Conference	Standing	Bowl/playoffs	AFCA^{#}	D2^{°}
Pittsburg State Gorillas (Mid-America Intercollegiate Athletics Association) (2024–present)
2024	Pittsburg State	8–3	7–2	2nd	L NCAA Division II First Round	17	14
2025	Pittsburg State	10–3	8–1	T–1st	L NCAA Division II Second Round	6	6
2026	Pittsburg State	4–7	4–5				
Pittsburg State:		22–13	19–8				
Total:		22–13					
