= Dan Orlovsky =

American football player and analyst (born 1983)

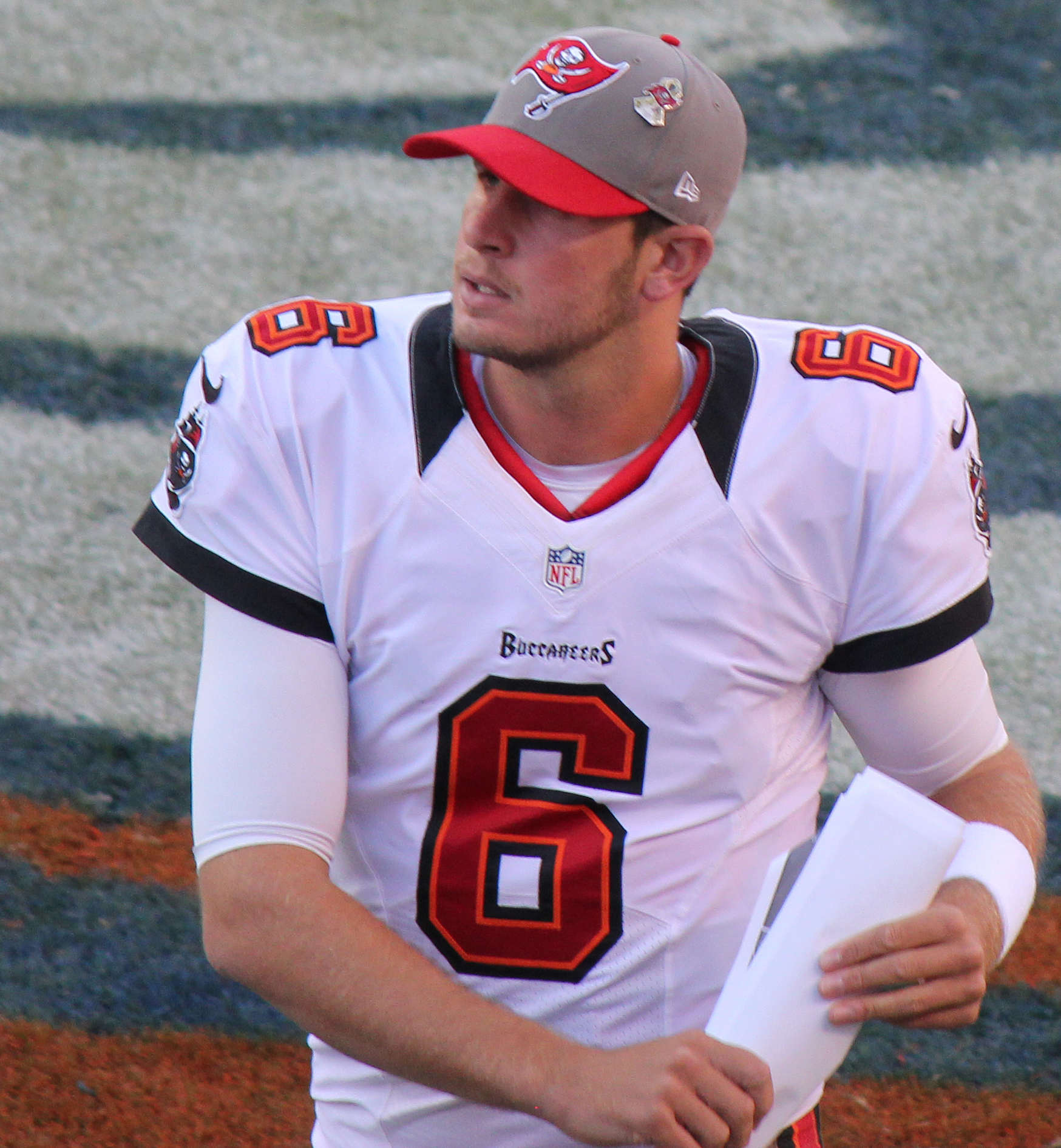
- Orlovsky with the Tampa Bay Buccaneers in 2012

No. 9, 6, 7, 8
- Position: Quarterback

Personal information
- Born: August 18, 1983 (age 43); Bridgeport, Connecticut, U.S.
- Listed height: 6 ft 5 in (1.96 m)
- Listed weight: 215 lb (98 kg)

Career information
- High school: Shelton (Shelton, Connecticut)
- College: UConn (2001–2004)
- NFL draft: 2005: 5th round, 145th overall pick

Career history
- Detroit Lions (2005–2008); Houston Texans (2009–2010); Indianapolis Colts (2011); Tampa Bay Buccaneers (2012–2013); Detroit Lions (2014–2016); Los Angeles Rams (2017)*
- * Offseason or practice squad member only

Career NFL statistics
- Passing attempts: 512
- Passing completions: 298
- Completion percentage: 58.2%
- TD–INT: 15–13
- Passing yards: 3,132
- Passer rating: 75.3
- Stats at Pro Football Reference

Daniel John Orlovsky (born August 18, 1983) is an American football analyst for ESPN and ABC and former professional football player. He played as a quarterback for 12 seasons in the National Football League (NFL), primarily as a backup.

Orlovsky played college football for the UConn Huskies. As a junior, his 33 passing touchdowns ranked seventh in NCAA Division I-A. He was selected by the Detroit Lions in the fifth round of the 2005 NFL draft. Orlovsky also played in the NFL for the Houston Texans, Indianapolis Colts, Tampa Bay Buccaneers, and Los Angeles Rams.

== Early life ==
Born in Bridgeport, Connecticut, Orlovsky played high school football and basketball. "When I was younger, I would have garbage cans set up all around the yard," Orlovsky recalled. "And I would have like 20 balls and just fire them into the cans. I really had nothing else to do back then."

Orlovsky attended Shelton High School and became the starting quarterback during his sophomore year. As a senior, he threw for 2,385 yards and 24 touchdowns as the Gaels went 12–0, winning a state championship. His overall record as a high school quarterback was 28–4. He earned All-American honors from Prep Football Report, SuperPrep and Prep Star, and was also named Connecticut all-state, Class LL MVP, the New Haven Register's Connecticut Player of the Year and winner of the McHugh Award.

== College career ==
=== 2001 ===
Orlovsky became the starter at Connecticut during his freshman year when Keron Henry suffered a sprained knee. Orlovsky threw for 1,379 yards and nine touchdowns on 128 of 269 passing (47.6 percent) while being intercepted 11 times.

=== 2002 ===
Starting every game as a sophomore, Orlovsky hit on 221 of 366 attempts (60.4 percent), with 19 touchdowns and 11 interceptions. His 2,488 yards passing rank fourth on the school's season-record list.

=== 2003 ===
As a junior, he completed 279 of 475 passes (58.7 percent) for 3,485 yards, 33 touchdowns and 14 interceptions. His 33 scoring tosses were tied for seventh in the NCAA Division I-A.

On October 11, UConn traveled to Raleigh, North Carolina to take on Heisman trophy candidate and future first round draft pick Philip Rivers and the N.C. State Wolfpack. Even though UConn lost the game 31–24 on a pick six interception return, Orlovsky threw for 299 yards, compared to Rivers 234 yards.

=== 2004 ===
Orlovsky did not match his 2003 figures as a senior. At Syracuse Orlovsky completed a school- and Big East-record 39 passes for a school-record 445 yards, in a 42–30 loss. At end of the season he led the team to victory in its inaugural bowl appearance, winning the Motor City Bowl, while earning Game MVP honors. He passed for 3,354 yards with 23 touchdowns and 15 interceptions on 288 of 456 throws (63.0 percent) in 2004. He was named the Walter Camp Connecticut Player of the Year Award for the 2004 season.

Orlovsky holds the school record for most pass completions (916), pass attempts (1,567), yards passing (10,706), touchdown passes (84), interceptions (51), total plays (1,710) and total yards (10,421).

Orlovsky, along with head coach Randy Edsall, served as the "face" of the UConn football program during the early 2000s.

== Professional career ==
Pre-draft measurables
Height	Weight	Arm length	Hand span	40-yard dash	10-yard split	20-yard split	20-yard shuttle	Three-cone drill	Vertical jump	Broad jump
6 ft 5 in (1.96 m)	225 lb (102 kg)	31 7/8 in (0.81 m)	9 5/8 in (0.24 m)	5.02 s	1.77 s	2.97 s	4.39 s	7.33 s	29.5 in (0.75 m)	8 ft 11 in (2.72 m)
All values from NFL Combine

=== Detroit Lions (first stint) ===
Orlovsky was selected during the fifth round of the 2005 NFL draft, 145th overall by the Detroit Lions. When Jeff Garcia went down with an injury in the 2005 preseason, Orlovsky emerged as the Lions' primary backup. He played in two regular season contests in 2005, including the nationally televised Thanksgiving Day game against the Atlanta Falcons. In the two contests combined, Orlovsky completed 7-of-17 passes for 63 yards, with no touchdowns or interceptions.

Before the 2006 season, the Lions traded Joey Harrington, released Jeff Garcia, and signed Jon Kitna and Josh McCown. Orlovsky spent the 2006 season as the third-string QB. Orlovsky was projected to be the second-string quarterback in 2007 because Drew Stanton, who was picked in the second round of the 2007 NFL draft, was placed on injured reserve; however, the Lions acquired J. T. O'Sullivan, who bumped Orlovsky back to third on the depth chart. Orlovsky did not take a regular season snap in 2006 or 2007; in 2008, O'Sullivan went to the San Francisco 49ers and emerged as the starting QB there.

On September 15 against the Green Bay Packers, he finished the game, completing two of four attempts for six yards.

Orlovsky made his first career NFL start on October 12, 2008, in a 12–10 Lions loss against the Minnesota Vikings. He completed 12 of 21 passes for 150 yards, with one touchdown and no turnovers. However, early in the first quarter when he lined up in shotgun formation, he inadvertently ran out of the back of his own end zone for a safety, in what turned out to be the margin of victory. "When they started blowing the whistle, I was like, 'Did we false start, or were they offsides or something?'" Orlovsky said. "And I looked, and I was just like, 'You're an idiot.'" The game ended up being the closest the Lions would come to a victory in their historic 0–16 season, as many of their other games ended up being blowouts.

In the following week of the Lions' winless season, Orlovsky connected with Calvin Johnson on a 96-yard touchdown pass.

Orlovsky also started in the final game of the 2008 season, but was unable to lead his team to their first victory of the season. Orlovsky announced his intention to explore the free agent market at the end of the 2008 season rather than accept a contract as a backup quarterback in Detroit.

=== Houston Texans ===
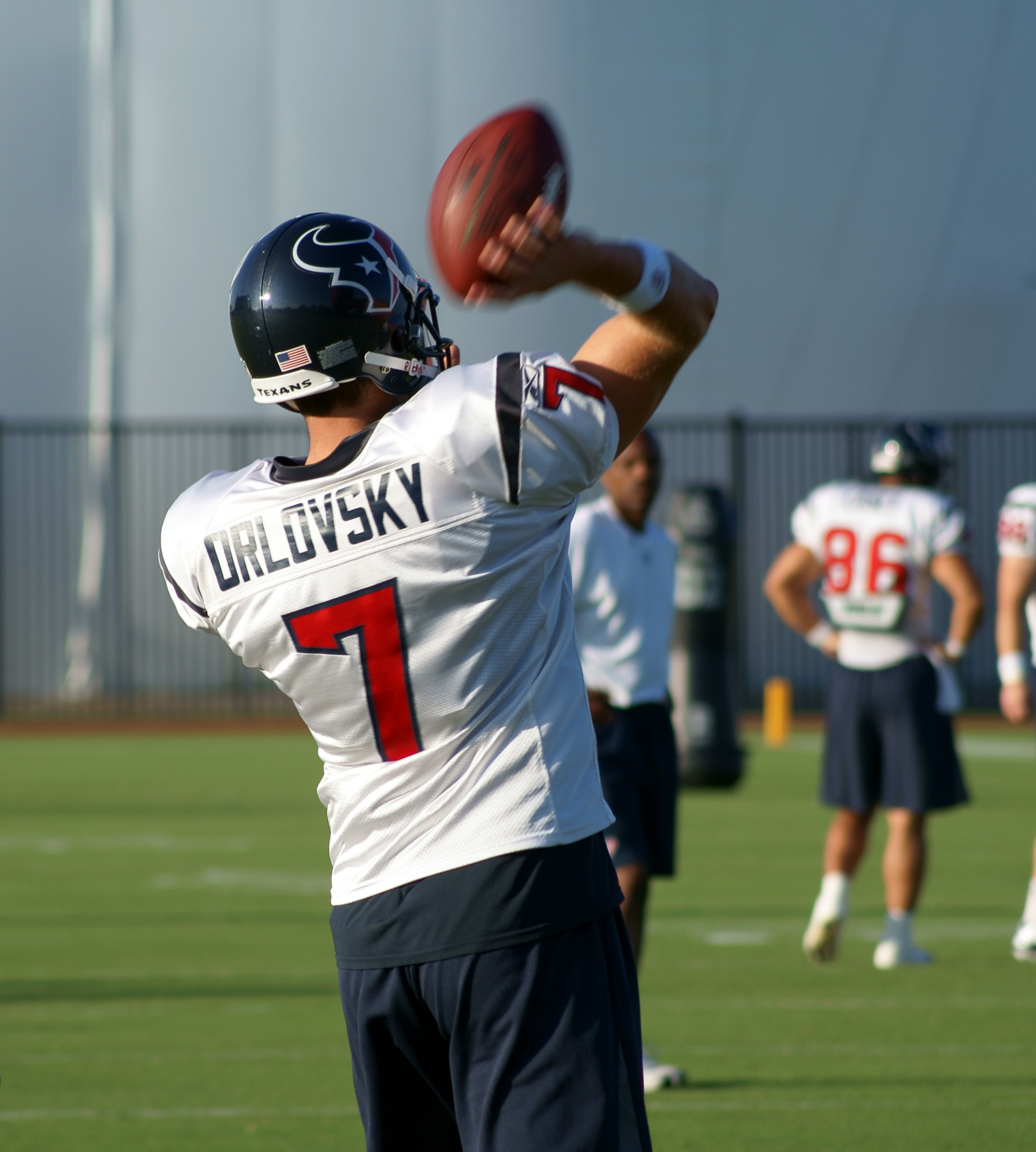
Orlovsky with the Houston Texans in 2010

He signed with the Houston Texans for a 3-year, $9 million deal on March 1, 2009. He was beaten out by Rex Grossman for the backup quarterback position during the preseason, and served as the Texans number three quarterback. After the 2009 season, Grossman signed a one-year contract with the Washington Redskins, making Orlovsky the backup quarterback for the Texans.

=== Indianapolis Colts ===
He signed with the Indianapolis Colts as a free agent on July 30, 2011. He was one of the final cuts as NFL teams trimmed their rosters to 53. The Colts later re-signed Orlovsky on September 27, 2011. He was named the starter over the benched Curtis Painter on November 30, 2011. The next week, Orlovsky went on to complete 30 of 37 passes, with 353 yards, 2 touchdowns, and 1 interception, for a total passer rating of 113.1 in his first start as a Colt against the New England Patriots, in a 31–24 loss.

On December 18, 2011, Orlovsky and the Colts won their first game of the season (after starting 0–13) against the Titans. This was Orlovsky's first official win as a starter in the NFL. On December 22, 2011, Orlovsky led the Colts on a 12-play, 78-yard drive in a comeback victory over the 10–4 Houston Texans with less than two minutes remaining in the game.

=== Tampa Bay Buccaneers ===
On March 15, 2012, the Tampa Bay Buccaneers signed Orlovsky to a two-year contract. On April 4, 2013, Orlovsky was cut by the Buccaneers. On April 8, 2013, four days after being cut, Orlovsky re-signed with the Buccaneers.

=== Detroit Lions (second stint) ===
On April 2, 2014, the Lions signed Orlovsky as their backup quarterback to Matthew Stafford. On March 2, 2015, the Lions re-signed Orlovsky to a one-year contract. In a game against the Cardinals, Orlovsky came in for a struggling Stafford, and threw for 191 yards, a touchdown, and an interception.

On March 11, 2016, the Lions re-signed Orlovsky as their primary backup quarterback to Stafford.

=== Los Angeles Rams ===
On July 20, 2017, Orlovsky signed with the Los Angeles Rams. He was released by the Rams on September 2.

Orlovsky announced his retirement from football on October 11, 2017.

== Career statistics ==
Legend
**Bold**	Career high

=== NFL ===
Year	Team	Games			Passing									
Year	Team	GP	GS	Record	Comp	Att	Pct	Yds	Avg	TD	Int	Sck	SckY	Rate
2005	DET	2	0	–	7	17	41.2	63	3.7	0	0	1	3	51.8
2006	DET	0	0	–	DNP									
2007	DET	0	0	–	DNP									
2008	DET	10	7	0–7	**143**	**255**	56.1	**1,616**	6.3	**8**	**8**	**14**	**95**	72.6
2009	HOU	0	0	–	DNP									
2010	HOU	1	0	–	0	0	0	0	0	0	0	0	0	0
2011	IND	8	5	**2–3**	122	193	**63.2**	1,201	6.2	6	4	**14**	84	**82.4**
2012	TB	1	0	–	4	7	57.1	51	**7.3**	0	0	0	0	80.1
2013	TB	2	0	–	0	0	0	0	0	0	0	0	0	0
2014	DET	0	0	–	DNP									
2015	DET	2	0	–	22	40	55.0	201	5.0	1	1	0	0	66.8
2016	DET	0	0	–	DNP									
Career		26	12	2–10	298	512	58.2	3,132	6.1	15	13	29	182	75.3

=== College ===
Year	Team	Games			Passing								Rushing			
Year	Team	GP	GS	Record	Cmp	Att	Pct	Yds	Y/A	TD	Int	Rtg	Att	Yds	Avg	TD
2001	Connecticut	10	6	1–5	128	269	47.6	1,379	5.1	9	11	93.5	31	–117	–3.8	2
2002	Connecticut	12	12	6–6	221	366	60.4	2,488	6.8	19	11	128.6	**50**	–86	–1.7	**4**
2003	Connecticut	12	12	**9–3**	279	**475**	58.7	**3,485**	**7.3**	**33**	14	**137.4**	30	**–41**	–1.4	0
2004	Connecticut	12	12	8–4	**288**	457	**63.0**	3,354	**7.3**	23	**15**	134.7	32	**–41**	**–1.3**	0
Career		46	42	24–18	916	1,567	58.5	10,706	6.8	84	51	127.0	143	–285	–2.0	6

== Post-playing career ==
In 2018, Orlovsky joined ESPN as an analyst. On May 18, 2022, Orlovsky joined the #2 ESPN NFL crew with Steve Levy and Louis Riddick Jr., replacing Brian Griese. On July 7, 2025, Orlovsky agreed to a multi-year contract extension with ESPN.

On October 27, 2026, Orlovsky revealed on The Pat McAfee Show that he did not know the definition of 'percent' until that morning, despite analyzing sports statistics in his profession.

== Personal life ==
Orlovsky is Christian. He is married to Tiffany Orlovsky and they have four children together. One of his sons, Madden, who is autistic, went viral for designing studio graphics and making a brief appearance on NFL Live on April 2, 2025, garnering hundreds of messages of support from around the sports world.
