= Keron Henry =

American football player (born 1982)

No. 10, 16
- Position: Wide receiver

Personal information
- Born: August 20, 1982 (age 44); Brooklyn, New York, U.S.
- Listed height: 6 ft 1 in (1.85 m)
- Listed weight: 218 lb (99 kg)

Career information
- High school: Brooklyn Technical
- College: Connecticut (2000–2004)
- NFL draft: 2005: undrafted

Career history
- New Orleans Saints (2005)*; San Diego Chargers (2005)*; New England Patriots (2005)*; Berlin Thunder (2006); New York Dragons (2007–2008)
- * Offseason or practice squad member only

Awards and highlights
- Nils V. "Swede" Nelson Award (2004)

Career AFL statistics
- Receptions: 21
- Receiving yards: 292
- Receiving TDs: 5
- Rushing yards: 9
- Rushing TDs: 5
- Stats at ArenaFan.com

Keron Henry (born August 20, 1982) is an American former professional football player who was a wide receiver in the National Football League (NFL). He played college football for the Connecticut Huskies.

== Early life ==
Henry attended Brooklyn Technical High School in Brooklyn, New York, and was an all-state football player in New York.

== College career ==
Henry chose to attend the University of Connecticut, where he continued his football career. When he suffered a knee injury, he lost his position as quarterback to Dan Orlovsky. To get back onto the field, Henry transitioned to wide receiver, where he had over 1,600 receiving yards. In his final game as a Huskie, Henry hauled in 9 passes during the 2004 Motor City Bowl.

== Professional career ==
After not being drafted during the 2005 NFL draft, Henry signed with the New Orleans Saints. Henry spent a few weeks on the practice squad for the Saints before being released.

On January 12, 2006, Henry signed on with the San Diego Chargers, where he was assigned to the Berlin Thunder of NFL Europe. He was waived by the Chargers on June 1, 2006.

On July 25, 2006, Henry signed with the New England Patriots.

He played for the New York Dragons during the 2007 and 2008 seasons.
