= Mike Horacek =

American football player (born 1973)

No. 2
- Position: Wide receiver

Personal information
- Born: July 7, 1973 (age 53); Omaha, Nebraska, U.S.
- Listed height: 6 ft 2 in (1.88 m)
- Listed weight: 200 lb (91 kg)

Career information
- College: Iowa State
- NFL draft: 1996: undrafted

Career history
- Detroit Lions (1996)*; Iowa Barnstormers (1997–2000); Green Bay Packers (2000)*; Jacksonville Jaguars (2000)*; Green Bay Packers (2001)*; New Jersey/Las Vegs Gladiators (2002–2003); New York Jets (2002)*; Green Bay Packers (2003)*; Indiana Firebirds (2004); New York Dragons (2005–2007); Kansas City Brigade (2008)
- * Offseason or practice squad member only

Awards and highlights
- AFL Offensive Player of the Year (2000); First-team All-Arena (2000)
- Stats at ArenaFan.com

Mickal Lee Horacek (born July 7, 1973) is an American former professional football wide receiver who played in the Arena Football League (AFL). He played college football at Iowa State. Horacek played professionally for the Iowa Barnstormers, New Jersey / Las Vegas Gladiators, Indiana Firebirds, New York Dragons and the Kansas City Brigade. His best season as a professional came in 2000, when he won the Arena Football League Offensive Player of the Year Award.

After retiring from football, Horacek became a realtor in Omaha.
