= Chris Dapolito =

American football player and coach

Playing career
- 2002–2004: Duke
- 2005–2006: Turku Trojans
- Position: Quarterback

Coaching career (HC unless noted)
- 2005–2006: Turku Trojans (OC)
- 2008–2009: Pace (AHC/OC/QB)
- 2010–2013: Pace

Head coaching record
- Overall: 1–38

Chris Dapolito is an American college football coach and former player. He served as the head football coach at Pace University from 2010 to 2013, compiling a record of 1–38. Dapolito played college football at Duke University, where he was a starting quarterback during the 2003 and 2004 seasons.

== Head coaching record ==
Year	Team	Overall	Conference	Standing	Bowl/playoffs
Pace Setters (Northeast 10 Conference) (2010–2013)
2010	Pace	0–9	0–7	9th	
2011	Pace	1–9	0–8	9th	
2012	Pace	0–9	0–8	9th	
2013	Pace	0–11	0–9	10th	
Pace:		1–38	0–32		
Total:		1–38			
