= Chris Anthony (American football) =

American football player (born 1979)

No. 86
- Positions: Wide receiver, linebacker

Personal information
- Born: January 10, 1979 (age 47); Bettendorf, Iowa, U.S.
- Listed height: 6 ft 3 in (1.91 m)
- Listed weight: 200 lb (91 kg)

Career information
- High school: Pleasant Valley (Riverdale, Iowa)
- College: Iowa State (1998–2002)
- NFL draft: 2003: undrafted

Career history
- New York Dragons (2003–2008)

Christopher Anthony (born January 10, 1979) is an American former arena football wide receiver and linebacker. He played for the New York Dragons of the Arena Football League (AFL). He played college football for Iowa State.

== Early life ==
Anthony attended Pleasant Valley High School in Riverdale, Iowa, and was a letterman in football, basketball, baseball, and track. He earned all-state honors in both football and basketball as a senior.

== College career ==
Anthony attended Iowa State University, where he played football and was a two-time team captain (1999, 2000) and two-time honorable mention All-Big 12 wide receiver (1998, 2000). He caught two touchdowns in Iowa State's first-ever bowl victory over Pittsburgh in the 2000 Insight.com Bowl.

== Playing career ==
He played six seasons for the New York Dragons, scoring over 100 regular season and post-season touchdowns. He also served as vice-president of the Arena Football League Players Association from 2008 to 2010.

== Personal life ==
Anthony's younger brother, Tom, is the head football coach for Pittsburg State University.
