= Will Holder (American football) =

American football player (born 1975)

William Holder (born November 17, 1975, in Orange, New Jersey) is a former Arena Football League defensive back and wide receiver.

Holder attended Monmouth University, in West Long Branch, New Jersey, where he majored in Political Science. At the time of his graduation, Holder was the all-time leading receiver in Monmouth program history with 115 catches for 2,309 yards and 25 touchdowns.

Holder spent the 2002 Arena Football League season on the practice squad of the New Jersey Gladiators. He joined the New York Dragons in 2003, playing there for five seasons. He then played for the Kansas City Brigade in 2008. In 2005, he joined the Oakland Raiders at their NFL training camp.
