= Josh Shaw (defensive tackle) =

American football player (born 1979)

No. 93, 75, 95
- Position: Defensive tackle

Personal information
- Born: September 7, 1979 (age 47); Fort Lauderdale, Florida, U.S.
- Listed height: 6 ft 4 in (1.93 m)
- Listed weight: 295 lb (134 kg)

Career information
- High school: Dillard (Fort Lauderdale)
- College: Michigan State
- NFL draft: 2002: 5th round, 172nd overall pick

Career history
- San Francisco 49ers (2002–2003); New Orleans Saints (2003)*; San Francisco 49ers (2004)*; Miami Dolphins (2004–2005); New York Dragons (2007); Oakland Raiders (2007); Denver Broncos (2008)
- * Offseason or practice squad member only

Career NFL statistics
- Total tackles: 11
- Sacks: 1
- Stats at Pro Football Reference

Josh Shaw (born September 7, 1979) is an American former professional football player who was a defensive tackle in the National Football League (NFL). He played college football for the Michigan State Spartans and was selected by the San Francisco 49ers in the fifth round of the 2002 NFL draft. After playing in the NFL, Shaw owned one of the biggest private medical marijuana hedge fund. He currently lives in Chicago with his wife and his two kids.

Shaw has also played for the Miami Dolphins, Oakland Raiders and Denver Broncos.
