= Adam Graessle =

American football player (born 1984)

No. 4
- Position: Punter

Personal information
- Born: November 25, 1984 (age 41); Dublin, Ohio, U.S.
- Listed height: 6 ft 5 in (1.96 m)
- Listed weight: 230 lb (104 kg)

Career information
- College: Pittsburgh (2003–2006)
- NFL draft: 2007: undrafted

Career history
- Green Bay Packers (2009)*; California Redwoods (2009); Pittsburgh Steelers (2010)*
- * Offseason or practice squad member only

Adam Vincent Graessle (born November 25, 1984) is an American former football punter. He was signed by the Green Bay Packers as an undrafted free agent in 2009. He played college football at Pittsburgh.

Graessle was also a member of the California Redwoods and Pittsburgh Steelers.

== College career ==
Graessle was rated the nation's No. 23 placekicker by Rivals.com coming out of high school. He was recruited by the University of Pittsburgh, where he was an All-Big East selection as a sophomore and was a Ray Guy Award candidate.

== Professional career ==
=== Green Bay Packers ===
In May 2009, Graessle was signed as an undrafted free agent by the Green Bay Packers. He was released prior to the start of the 2009 season.

=== Pittsburgh Steelers ===
Graessle signed a future contract with the Pittsburgh Steelers on February 9, 2010. He was waived on June 15.
