= Jason Willis =

American football player (born 1980)

No. 84, 14
- Position: Wide receiver

Personal information
- Born: July 26, 1980 (age 46); Los Angeles, California, U.S.
- Listed height: 6 ft 1 in (1.85 m)
- Listed weight: 200 lb (91 kg)

Career information
- High school: St. Bernard (Los Angeles)
- College: Oregon
- NFL draft: 2003: undrafted

Career history
- Seattle Seahawks (2003–2004); → Frankfurt Galaxy (2004); Miami Dolphins (2005–2006)*; Washington Redskins (2007)*; New York Dragons (2007–2008); Jacksonville Sharks (2010); Pittsburgh Power (2011); San Antonio Talons (2012); San Jose SaberCats (2013–2014); Las Vegas Outlaws (2015)
- * Offseason or practice squad member only

Career NFL statistics
- Games played: 1
- Tackles: 1
- Stats at Pro Football Reference

Career AFL statistics
- Receptions: 717
- Receiving yards: 8,613
- Receiving touchdowns: 160
- Rushing touchdowns: 3
- Kick return yards: 1,303
- Stats at ArenaFan.com

Jason Patrick Willis (born July 26, 1980) is an American former professional football player who was a wide receiver in the Arena Football League (AFL) and National Football League (NFL). He played college football for the Oregon Ducks.

== Early life ==
Willis attended Saint Bernard High School in Playa Del Rey, California.

== College career ==
Willis played collegiately at the University of Oregon. Willis also ran track for the University of Oregon.

== Professional career ==
After going undrafted in the 2003 NFL draft, Willis signed with the Seattle Seahawks on May 1, 2003. He was placed on injured reserve on August 26, 2003 after breaking his thumb. In 2004, he was allocated to NFL Europe to play with the Frankfurt Galaxy. He started all 10 games for the Galaxy during the 2004 NFL Europe season, catching 26 passes for 332 yards and returning 10 kicks for 250 yards. the Galaxy advanced to the 2004 World Bowl Championship, where they were defeated by the Berlin Thunder. Willis was waived by the Seahawks on September 5, 2004, but signed to the team's practice squad two days later. He was promoted to the active roster on December 11 and appeared in one game during the 2004 NFL season, recording one solo tackle. Willis was waived by the Seahawks again on August 29, 2005.

On November 2, 2005, Willis was signed to the practice squad of the Miami Dolphins. He signed a reserve/future contract with the team on January 3, 2006, and was waived on August 29, 2006. Willis was later re-signed to the Dolphins' practice squad on December 12, 2006. He became a free agent after the 2006 season.

Willis signed with the Washington Redskins on June 15, 2007, and was waived on July 31, 2007.

In 2012, Willis assigned to the San Antonio Talons Willis was later assigned to the San Jose SaberCats in November 2012.

On April 30, 2015, Willis was assigned to the Las Vegas Outlaws.
