= Jeremiah Pharms =

American football player (born 1978)

No. 42
- Position: Fullback/Linebacker

Personal information
- Born: June 24, 1978 (age 48); Sacramento, California, U.S.
- Listed height: 6 ft 0 in (1.83 m)
- Listed weight: 251 lb (114 kg)

Career information
- High school: Sacramento (CA) Valley
- College: Washington
- NFL draft: 2001: 5th round, 134th overall pick

Career history
- Eastside Hawks (2004); New York Dragons (2006–2007)

Awards and highlights
- Northwest Football League champion (2004)

Career AFL statistics
- Tackles: 34
- Sacks: 1
- Interceptions: 1
- Stats at ArenaFan.com

Jeremiah Keith Pharms (born June 24, 1978) is an American former professional football fullback/linebacker in the Arena Football League (AFL). He was selected by the Cleveland Browns in the fifth round of the 2001 NFL draft with the 134th overall pick. However, he never signed with the team. In May 2004, the Browns released his draft rights after Pharms was arrested for a robbery that occurred 14 months earlier. He later played two seasons for the New York Dragons of the AFL from 2006 to 2007.

Pre-draft measurables
Height	Weight	Arm length	Hand span	40-yard dash	10-yard split	20-yard split	20-yard shuttle	Three-cone drill	Vertical jump	Broad jump
6 ft 0 1/2 in (1.84 m)	257 lb (117 kg)	32 in (0.81 m)	9 1/2 in (0.24 m)	4.88 s	1.72 s	2.79 s	4.53 s	7.37 s	32.5 in (0.83 m)	8 ft 10 in (2.69 m)
All values from NFL Combine
