= Matt Applebaum =

American football coach (born 1984)

Miami Dolphins
- Title: Assistant offensive line coach

Personal information
- Born: January 20, 1984 (age 42); Yardley, Pennsylvania, U.S.
- Listed height: 6 ft 3 in (1.91 m)
- Listed weight: 295 lb (134 kg)

Career information
- High school: Pennsbury
- College: UConn (2002–2006)

Career history
- Central Connecticut (2008) Tight ends coach & video coordinator; Washington Redskins (2008) Pro personnel assistant; Washington Redskins (2009) College personnel assistant; Washington Redskins (2010) Offensive assistant; Miami (FL) (2011–2012) Graduate assistant; Bucknell (2013) Offensive line coach; Jacksonville Jaguars (2014) Offensive assistant; Southeastern Louisiana (2015) Offensive line coach; Davidson (2016) Offensive line coach; Davidson (2017) Offensive coordinator & offensive line coach; Towson (2018–2019) Offensive line coach; Boston College (2020–2021) Offensive line coach; Miami Dolphins (2022) Offensive line coach; Boston College (2023–2025) Offensive line coach; Miami Dolphins (2026–present) Assistant offensive line coach

Matt Applebaum (born January 20, 1984) is an American football coach and former player who currently serves as the assistant offensive line coach for the Miami Dolphins of the National Football League (NFL). Applebaum played college football at UConn, where he started on the offensive line for two years.

Pre-draft measurables
Height	Weight
6 ft 3 1/4 in (1.91 m)	295 lb (134 kg)
Values from Pro Day

== Coaching career ==
Applebaum started his coaching career at Central Connecticut State University, where he was the tight ends coach. He spent five months there before leaving for the NFL, joining the Washington Redskins in 2008 as a player personnel/coaching assistant. In 2011, Applebaum departed the Redskins to become an offensive graduate assistant/quality control coach for the University of Miami. He spent one year and a half there before being hired as the offensive line coach at Bucknell University in 2013. In 2014, Applebaum returned to the NFL to become an offensive assistant for the Jacksonville Jaguars. He left the Jaguars in 2015 to become the offensive line coach at Southeastern Louisiana University. In 2016, Applebaum became the offensive line coach at Davidson College. The next year, he was promoted to offensive coordinator while continuing to serve as the offensive line coach. Applebaum was hired by Towson University in 2018 to be their offensive line coach. In 2020, he became a part of Boston College's staff as their offensive line coach.

=== Miami Dolphins ===
On February 12, 2022, it was announced that Applebaum would be leaving Boston College to become the offensive line coach of the Miami Dolphins. On February 2, 2023, the Dolphins parted ways with Applebaum. On February 15, 2023, Applebaum was named the offensive line coach at Boston College, returning for his second stint in the same role.

On January 30, 2026, the Miami Dolphins hired Applebaum to serve as the team's assistant offensive line coach under new head coach Jeff Hafley.
