= Matt Tarullo =

American football player (born 1982)

No. 62
- Positions: Guard, center

Personal information
- Born: August 13, 1982 (age 44); Albany, New York, U.S.

Career information
- College: Syracuse

Career history
- 2005-2006: Dallas Cowboys*
- 2006-2007: New York Giants*
- 2007: Indianapolis Colts*
- 2007: Dallas Cowboys*
- * Offseason or practice squad member only

Matthew Gene Tarullo (born August 13, 1982) is an American former professional football guard and center in the National Football League (NFL).

He was signed as an undrafted free agent out of Syracuse University. He has never played a down in an official NFL game. Tarullo was released from the Dallas Cowboys in 2006 and picked up by the New York Giants to participate on the practice squad.
