= Brian Toal =

American football player (born 1985)

No. 40, 51
- Position: Fullback / linebacker

Personal information
- Born: March 8, 1985 (age 41); Wyckoff, New Jersey, U.S.
- Listed height: 6 ft 0 in (1.83 m)
- Listed weight: 238 lb (108 kg)

Career information
- High school: Don Bosco Prep (Ramsey, New Jersey)
- College: Boston College
- NFL draft: 2009: undrafted

Career history
- Las Vegas Locomotives (2009–2010); New York Jets (2011)*
- * Offseason or practice squad member only

Awards and highlights
- 2× UFL champion (2009, 2010); Freshman All-American (2004); Big East Rookie of the Year (2004)
- Stats at Pro Football Reference

Brian P. Toal (born March 8, 1985) is an American former football linebacker. He was drafted by the Las Vegas Locomotives in the UFL premiere season draft in 2009. He played college football at Boston College.

He was also a member of the New York Jets, but did not play. He is married to Phil Simms' daughter Dierdre.

== Early life ==
Toal grew up in Wyckoff, New Jersey. After a high school senior season in which he made 106 tackles and 10.5 sacks as a linebacker and ran for 1,063 yards and 32 touchdowns as a half back, Toal was named an All-American by USA Today and Parade, selected as the New Jersey Player of the Year by Gatorade and The Star-Ledger, and chosen to play in the U.S. Army All-American Bowl where he scored 3 touchdowns. A two-time All-State first-team selection, he led Don Bosco Preparatory High School to back-to-back NJSIAA Parochial Group 4 titles (2002 and 2003). Toal also excelled on Don Bosco's track team, winning the 100 and 200 meters and shot put events at the league meet as a junior. Toal has 2 other brothers and is the son of Greg Toal (Don Bosco Prep Coach).

== College career ==
One of the most coveted recruits in BC football history, Toal played in all 12 games as a true freshman, starting the final nine. He made his college debut in the season opener at Ball State, making one solo stop and four assisted tackles. He was named Big East Defensive Player of the Week after a career-high 15 tackles (12 solos, two tackles for loss) against Rutgers. He finished as BC's second-leading tackler with 77 (37 solos). He also recorded 4.5 tackles for loss, two pass breakups, one forced fumble and one blocked punt. He was selected as the 2004 Big East Rookie of the Year and a The Sporting News Freshman All-American. He made seven tackles in BC's Continental Tire Bowl victory of North Carolina.

Playing on offense, defense, and special teams, Toal recorded 53 tackles (32 solos), seven tackles for loss, two sacks, one forced fumble, one pass breakup on defense, one blocked field goal, and carried the ball 21 times for 49 yards and a team-high six touchdowns, including a one-yard touchdown to give BC an overtime victory against Clemson. Toal only played sparingly against Boise State in the MPC Computers Bowl, recording one assisted tackle.

Toal played in all of BC's 13 games, finishing the year with 50 tackles (29 solo) stops, 4.5 tackles for loss, one fumble recovery, two pass breakups, and two interceptions. On offense, he ran 19 times for 35 yards for a team high five touchdowns. Toal also had one receiving touchdown as a running back. He had one assisted tackle and a one-yard touchdown run against Navy in the Meineke Car Care Bowl.

Toal started out the 2007 season on The Sporting News Preseason All-ACC second-team and on the watch lists for the Bednarik and Butkus Awards. He would miss the entire season, however, due to a right shoulder injury. After receiving a Medical Redshirt, Toal returned for his senior season in 2008. His college career would come to an early end, however, as he suffered a season-ending injury (broken right fibula) against Virginia Tech on October 18.

== Professional career ==
Toal went undrafted in the 2009 NFL draft, but was drafted by the Las Vegas Locomotives in the UFL premiere season draft and signed with the team on August 5, 2009.

Toal signed a future contract with the New York Jets on January 5, 2011. He was waived on August 23.
