= Matt Lawrence (American football) =

American football player (born 1985)

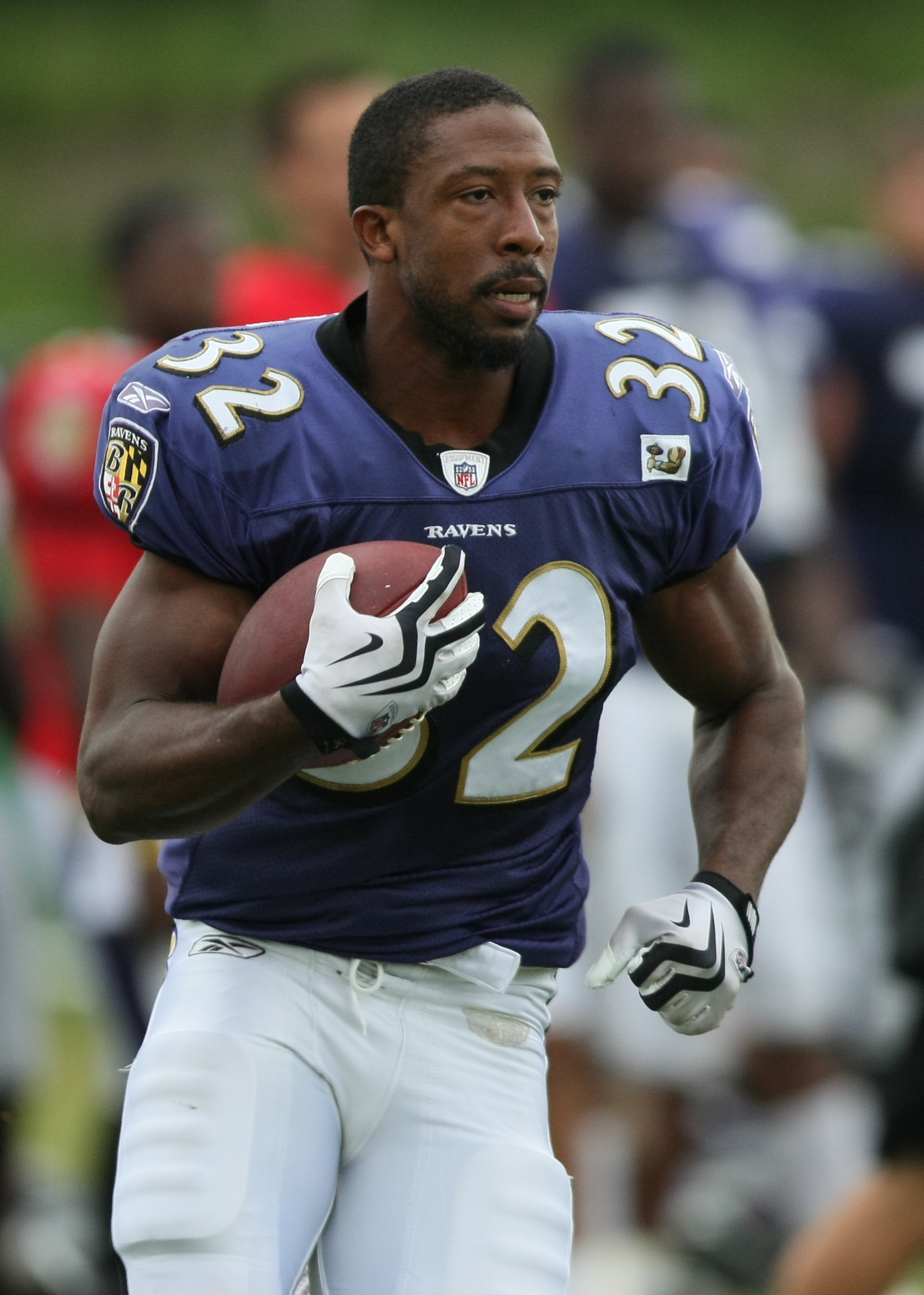
- Lawrence with the Baltimore Ravens in 2009

No. 32
- Position: Running back

Personal information
- Born: May 5, 1985 (age 41); Hartford, Connecticut, U.S.
- Listed height: 6 ft 1 in (1.85 m)
- Listed weight: 204 lb (93 kg)

Career information
- High school: Bloomfield (Bloomfield, Connecticut)
- College: Connecticut (2003-2004); Massachusetts (2005-2007)
- NFL draft: 2008: undrafted

Career history
- Chicago Bears (2008)*; Seattle Seahawks (2008)*; Baltimore Ravens (2008–2011)
- * Offseason or practice squad member only

Awards and highlights
- Second-team All-CAA (2007)

Career NFL statistics
- Receptions: 1
- Receiving yards: 4
- Total tackles: 8
- Stats at Pro Football Reference

Matthew Nashid Lawrence (born May 5, 1985) is an American former professional football player who was a running back in the National Football League (NFL). He was signed by the Chicago Bears as an undrafted free agent in 2007. He was also a member of the Seattle Seahawks and Baltimore Ravens. He played college football for the UMass Minutemen after transferring from the Connecticut Huskies.

== Professional career ==
Going undrafted into the NFL in 2008, Lawrence was first signed by the Chicago Bears and Seattle Seahawks and then by the Baltimore Ravens. But he had no statistics in 2008. but in 2009 he had four carries but for zero yards. he spent all of 2010 and 2011 on injured reserve.

== Post-playing career ==
Lawrence founded 32 Sports, a nonprofit that bridges the gap between professional athletes and youth sports. Lawrence also founded Connecticut’s first all-girls high school flag football league.
