= Cornell Brockington =

Former American football running back (born 1983)

Profile
- Position: Tailback

Personal information
- Born: October 26, 1983 (age 43)
- Listed height: 6 ft 0 in (1.83 m)
- Listed weight: 192 lb (87 kg)

Career information
- High school: Willingboro (NJ)
- College: UConn (2003–2005)

Awards and highlights
- First-team All-Big East (2004)

Cornell Brockington Jr. (born October 26, 1983) is an American former football tailback. He played college football for the UConn Huskies from 2003 to 2005. He grew up in Burlington, New Jersey, attended Willingboro High School, and was a second cousin to former All-American running back John Brockington. As a senior in high school, he rushed for 1,800 yards and 25 touchdowns. In 2004, he gained 1,218 rushing yards on 238 carries for an average of 5.1 yards per carry. His 2004 rushing yardage led the Big East Conference, and he was chosen as a first-team player on the 2004 All-Big East Conference football team.
