= Alfred Fincher =

American football player (born 1983)

No. 56, 51
- Position: Linebacker

Personal information
- Born: August 15, 1983 (age 43); Key West, Florida, U.S.
- Listed height: 6 ft 1 in (1.85 m)
- Listed weight: 238 lb (108 kg)

Career information
- High school: Norwood (MA)
- College: Connecticut
- NFL draft: 2005: 3rd round, 82nd overall pick

Career history
- New Orleans Saints (2005–2007); Detroit Lions (2008)*; Washington Redskins (2008); New York Sentinels (2009)
- * Offseason or practice squad member only

Career NFL statistics
- Total tackles: 26
- Stats at Pro Football Reference

Alfred William Fincher (born August 15, 1983) is an American former professional football player who was a linebacker in the National Football League (NFL). He was selected by the New Orleans Saints in the third round of the 2005 NFL draft. He played college football for the Connecticut Huskies.

Fincher was also a member of the Detroit Lions, Washington Redskins, and New York Sentinels.

== Professional career ==
=== New Orleans Saints ===
In 2006, Fincher played in six games for the New Orleans Saints and recorded nine tackles.

Fincher played in seven games for the New Orleans Saints in 2007, recording three tackles. He was placed on injured reserve on November 4, 2007 due to a concussion, ending his season. He was waived from injured reserve on November 29. He has inspired his cousin Travis Fincher while playing for the 'SR Colts', during the 2007-08 season.

=== Detroit Lions ===
On March 27, 2008, Fincher was signed by the Detroit Lions. However, he was released on July 27 after linebacker Teddy Lehman was re-signed.

=== Washington Redskins ===
On July 31, 2008, Fincher was signed by the Washington Redskins. He re-signed with the Redskins on March 10, 2009. He was waived on August 30.

== Personal life ==
Fincher works as a fisherman in the Bahamas.
