= List of UConn Huskies bowl games =

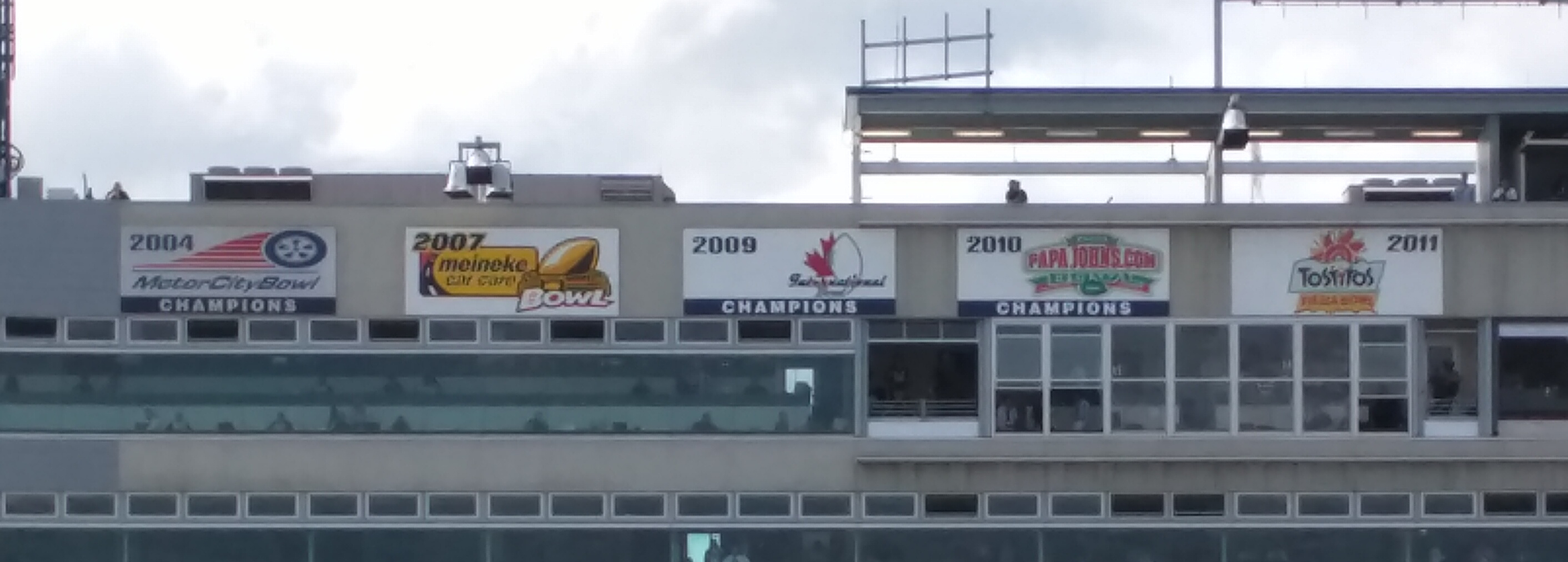
Bowl game banners at Pratt & Whitney Stadium at Rentschler Field, home of UConn Huskies football, as of September 2015

The UConn Huskies football team has represented the University of Connecticut in National Collegiate Athletic Association (NCAA) football since the team's founding in 1896. The Huskies have played in nine post-season bowl games, all following their transition from Division I-AA to Division I-A in 2000. (Note: In August 2006 the NCAA changed the name of Division I-A to Football Bowl Subdivision (FBS) and Division I-AA to Football Championship Subdivision (FCS). In this article the old names are used to refer to events that occurred prior to August 2006.) UConn's longest bowl invitation streak is four seasons, from 2007 to 2010.

The UConn Huskies football program enjoyed its greatest period of success during the first head coaching tenure of Randy Edsall (1999–2011). Prior to his hiring, UConn only appeared in two post-season football contests, during the 1998 NCAA Division I-AA playoffs. Under Edsall, the Huskies played in five bowl games including one Bowl Championship Series (BCS) bowl game. The team also shared two Big East Conference (Note: The American Athletic Conference operated as the Big East Conference from 1979 through 2013. See 2010–13 Big East Conference realignment for more information. This article uses the name "Big East" to refer to the conference for the years 2013 and earlier, and "American Athletic Conference" or "AAC" to refer to the conference from 2014 onwards.) championships and were ranked at various times in the Associated Press (AP), Coaches', and Harris polls, as well as the BCS standings. Subsequent to Edsall's first departure after the 2010 season, UConn has played in four bowl games: in 2015 under Bob Diaco, in 2022 and 2024 under Jim L. Mora, and 2025 under interim head coach Gordon Sammis.

Multiple future National Football League (NFL) draft picks have had superior performances for the Huskies in bowl games, including the first Connecticut player ever to be picked in the first round of the draft: running back Donald Brown. Brown, the all-time leading rusher in UConn bowl game history with 333 yards on 42 carries, made appearances in the 2007 Meineke Car Care Bowl and the 2009 International Bowl, where he was named most valuable player (MVP) after rushing for 261 yards and a touchdown—the best single-game rushing performance in Connecticut bowl game history. Dan Orlovsky earned MVP honors for his UConn-bowl single-game-record passing performance in 2004; he was drafted in the fifth round of the 2005 NFL draft by the Detroit Lions. Wide receiver Marcus Easley was drafted in the fourth round of the 2010 NFL draft by the Buffalo Bills.

The Huskies' first post-season bowl game was in 2004, when they participated in the 2004 Motor City Bowl in Detroit, Michigan on December 27 against the Toledo Rockets. The most recent UConn bowl game occurred on December 27, 2025, when the Huskies faced the Army Black Knights in the 2025 Fenway Bowl. A loss in that game brought Connecticut to an overall bowl record of four wins and five losses.

Appearances per Bowl
Bowl Game	Appearances
Fenway Bowl	2
Motor City Bowl*	1
Meineke Car Care Bowl*	1
International Bowl	1
PapaJohns.com Bowl*	1
Fiesta Bowl	1
St. Petersburg Bowl*	1
Myrtle Beach Bowl	1

_{*This bowl game's name has changed one or more
times since UConn's last appearance. See the linked
articles for the name change history.}

== Summary table ==
Key
#	Number of bowl games
†	Attendance record
‡	Former attendance record
W	Win
L	Loss

Attendance records are correct as of the end of the 2024 NCAA Division I FBS football season.

#	Season	Bowl game	Result	Opponent	Stadium	Location	Attendance
1	2004	2004 Motor City Bowl	W 39–10	Toledo	Ford Field	Detroit, Michigan	52,552^{‡}
2	2007	2007 Meineke Car Care Bowl	L 24–10	Wake Forest	Bank of America Stadium	Charlotte, North Carolina	53,126
3	2008	2009 International Bowl	W 38–20	Buffalo	Rogers Centre	Toronto, Ontario, Canada	40,184^{†}
4	2009	2010 PapaJohns.com Bowl	W 20–7	South Carolina	Legion Field	Birmingham, Alabama	45,254^{‡}
5	2010	2011 Fiesta Bowl	L 48–20	Oklahoma	University of Phoenix Stadium	Glendale, Arizona	67,232
6	2015	2015 St. Petersburg Bowl	L 16–10	Marshall	Tropicana Field	St. Petersburg, Florida	14,652
7	2022	2022 Myrtle Beach Bowl	L 28–14	Marshall	Brooks Stadium	Conway, South Carolina	12,023^{†}
8	2024	2024 Fenway Bowl	W 27–14	North Carolina	Fenway Park	Boston, Massachusetts	27,900^{†}
9	2025	2025 Fenway Bowl	L 16–41	Army	Fenway Park	Boston, Massachusetts	22,461

== Game summaries ==
=== 2004 Motor City Bowl ===
2004 Motor City Bowl
UConn Huskies	Toledo Rockets
39	10
	1	2	3	4	Total
UConn	17	13	3	6	39
Toledo	0	7	3	0	10
- Date: December 27, 2004
- Season: 2004
- Stadium: Ford Field
- Location: Detroit, Michigan

The first bowl game in Connecticut history came at the conclusion of the 2004 NCAA Division I-A football season, the first year UConn was a full member of the Big East Conference for football. The season before, UConn finished with a 9–3 overall record, but did not receive a bowl invitation due to the lack of conference affiliation. Even as a full member of the Big East, UConn was shut out of the conference-affiliated bowl picture. Pittsburgh, Boston College (in its last year in the Big East before leaving to join the Atlantic Coast Conference (ACC)), West Virginia, and Syracuse all finished ahead of the Huskies in a four-way tie for first place; they filled four of the five conference bowl slots. The remaining slot was filled by Notre Dame, who was not a member of the Big East Conference for football but had a contract allowing them to be selected in place of a Big East team. Fortunately for UConn, the Big Ten did not have enough bowl-eligible teams to fill all of its contracted bowl slots, allowing the Motor City Bowl to pick the Huskies. UConn's opponent would be the Toledo Rockets of the Mid-American Conference (MAC), who earned their berth by winning the 2004 MAC Championship Game.

The 2004 Motor City Bowl was played on December 27, 2004 at Ford Field in Detroit, Michigan. The game was anticipated to be a high-scoring affair, with both teams' quarterbacks among the top seven nationally in passing that year. However, Toledo quarterback Bruce Gradkowski had broken his throwing hand during the MAC Championship Game and was largely ineffective; he was only able to complete six of twelve passes for 43 yards and did not play in the second half. Connecticut scored what was then a Motor City Bowl-record 17 points in the first quarter, from a field goal, a 32-yard touchdown pass from quarterback Dan Orlovsky to wide receiver Jason Williams on a 4th-down-and-6 play, and a 68-yard punt return for a touchdown by Larry Taylor. In the second quarter, after Toledo finally scored on a one-yard rushing touchdown by Gradkowski, UConn added 13 more points to the scoreboard. The Rockets would not come back in the second half; the Huskies won the game 39–10. Orlovsky was named the game's most valuable player (MVP); he completed 20 of 41 passes for 239 yards and two touchdowns.

=== 2007 Meineke Car Care Bowl ===
2007 Meineke Car Care Bowl
UConn Huskies	Wake Forest Demon Deacons
10	24
	1	2	3	4	Total
UConn	7	3	0	0	10
Wake Forest	0	0	14	10	24
- Date: December 29, 2007
- Season: 2007
- Stadium: Bank of America Stadium
- Location: Charlotte, North Carolina

Following two seasons where they struggled to replace graduated quarterback Dan Orlovsky and lost more games than they won, Connecticut returned to bowl eligibility in 2007, finishing the regular season with a record of 9–3 and claiming a share of the Big East Conference championship. Fellow conference co-champion West Virginia, who beat the Huskies 66–21 that year, earned the Big East's automatic BCS bowl bid; UConn had to settle for the Meineke Car Care Bowl. Their opponent was Wake Forest, the previous season's Atlantic Coast Conference (ACC) champion.

In the first half, Connecticut took a 10–0 lead off of a 68-yard punt return for a touchdown by Larry Taylor and a field goal. Wake Forest dominated the second half, taking the lead late in the third quarter off of 20-yard touchdown pass from quarterback Riley Skinner to tight end John Tereshinski. The Demon Deacons added ten more points in the fourth quarter off of a field goal and a nine-yard touchdown run by running back Micah Andrews. The final score was 24–10 in favor of Wake Forest. UConn earned only nine first downs and failed to score an offensive touchdown.

=== 2009 International Bowl ===
2009 International Bowl
Buffalo Bulls	UConn Huskies
20	38
	1	2	3	4	Total
Buffalo	3	17	0	0	20
UConn	7	10	7	14	38
- Date: January 3, 2009
- Season: 2008
- Stadium: Rogers Centre
- Location: Toronto, Ontario, Canada

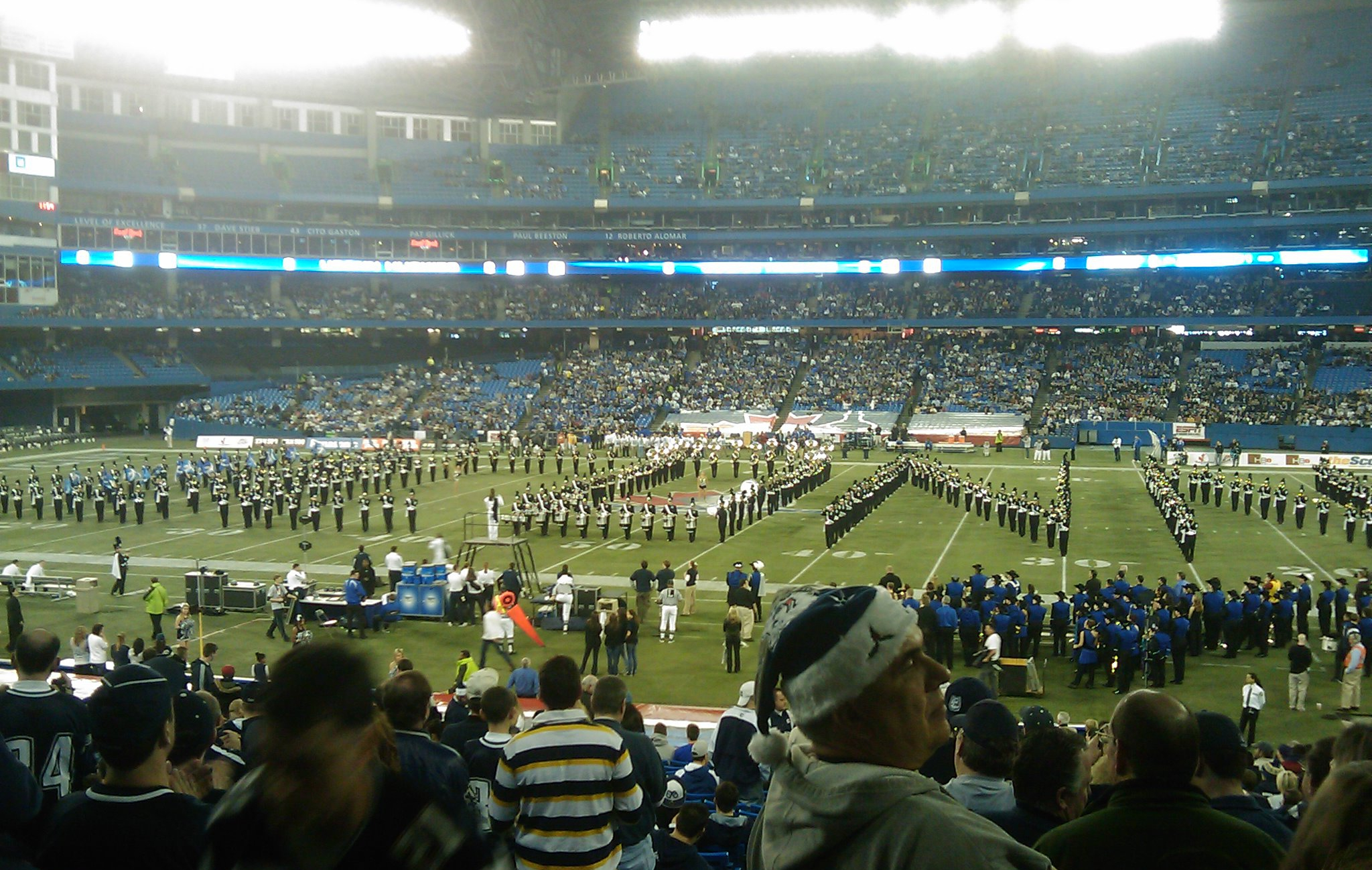
The UConn marching band performs prior to kickoff.

Connecticut was selected as a participant in the 2009 International Bowl following a 7–5 regular season where they won their first five games, only to lose five of their last seven contests. Facing the Huskies were the Buffalo Bulls with a regular season record of 8–5, highlighted by an upset win over then-No. 12 (Note: All rankings are based on the Associated Press (AP) Poll unless otherwise noted.) and undefeated Ball State in the 2008 MAC Championship Game. This was the second time, after the 2004 Motor City Bowl, that the Huskies faced the MAC champions in a bowl game.

The Huskies, led by running back Donald Brown's 208 yards rushing, dominated the first half statistically, but found themselves down 20–10 midway through the second quarter due to giving up six fumbles, five of which were recovered by Buffalo. UConn would close the gap to 20–17 by halftime, and take the lead for good late in the third quarter off of a 4-yard touchdown pass from quarterback Tyler Lorenzen to tight end Steve Brouse. The Connecticut victory was sealed when, late in the fourth quarter, Buffalo quarterback Drew Willy threw a pass that was intercepted by UConn safety Dahna Deleston and returned 100 yards for a touchdown, making the final score 38–20 in favor of the Huskies.

Brown was named player of the game. He finished with 261 rushing yards and one touchdown; his 2,083 rushing yards for the 2008 season was best in the NCAA. Following the game, Brown declared his eligibility for the 2009 NFL draft; he would become the first Connecticut player ever drafted in the first round. Three other UConn players were drafted in the second round.

=== 2010 PapaJohns.com Bowl ===
2010 PapaJohns.com Bowl
South Carolina Gamecocks	UConn Huskies
7	20
	1	2	3	4	Total
South Carolina	0	0	0	7	7
UConn	10	3	0	7	20
- Date: January 2, 2010
- Season: 2009
- Stadium: Legion Field
- Location: Birmingham, Alabama

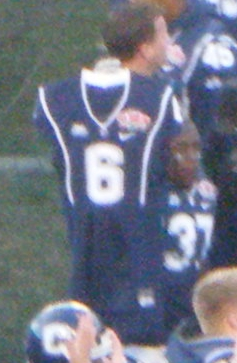
Jersey of Jasper Howard held aloft

Connecticut was selected as a participant in the 2010 PapaJohns.com Bowl following a tumultuous 7–5 regular season, marked by the loss of five games by a total of fifteen points between them, a double-overtime victory at Notre Dame, and the murder of cornerback Jasper Howard. Facing the Huskies were the South Carolina Gamecocks with the same regular season record of 7–5, highlighted by wins over then-No. 4 Mississippi and then-No. 15 Clemson. This game would be the first time UConn would face a Southeastern Conference opponent in a bowl game.

Connecticut took control of the contest in the first quarter, scoring on a one-handed 37-yard touchdown reception by wide receiver Kashif Moore and then, after South Carolina failed to convert a fourth down play at their own 32-yard line, kicking a 33-yard field goal to take a 10–0 lead. Running back Andre Dixon scored on a 10-yard rush early in the fourth quarter to put the game away for UConn; the only Gamecock touchdown, on a two-yard run by Brian Maddox, came after the game had effectively been decided. The final score was 20–7 in favor of the Huskies.

Dixon was named player of the game, finishing with 126 rushing yards and one touchdown. Connecticut wide receiver Marcus Easley and South Carolina linebacker Eric Norwood were among four players from the two teams to be selected in the 2010 NFL draft.

=== 2011 Fiesta Bowl ===
2011 Fiesta Bowl
UConn Huskies	Oklahoma Sooners
20	48
	1	2	3	4	Total
UConn	0	10	10	0	20
Oklahoma	14	6	14	14	48
- Date: January 1, 2011
- Season: 2010
- Stadium: University of Phoenix Stadium
- Location: Glendale, Arizona

Connecticut was selected to play in the 2011 Fiesta Bowl, their only Bowl Championship Series (BCS) appearance, following an 8–4 regular season where they split the Big East conference championship with Pittsburgh and West Virginia. The Huskies earned the BCS berth by beating both West Virginia and Pittsburgh in consecutive weeks during the regular season. They faced the Oklahoma Sooners, who beat Nebraska to win the 2010 Big 12 Championship Game. The game marked the first matchup between the Huskies and a Big 12 team in a bowl game, and the first meeting ever in football between Connecticut and Oklahoma.

Oklahoma converted their first two possessions into touchdowns to take a 14–0 lead at the end of the first quarter. The Huskies struck back as cornerback Dwayne Gratz intercepted a pass from Sooner quarterback Landry Jones and returned it for a touchdown; after multiple field goals, the score was 20–10 in Oklahoma's favor at halftime. In the second half, Oklahoma added two more touchdowns on a 59-yard pass and an interception return for a touchdown to extend their lead to 34–10; Connecticut responded by returning the ensuing kickoff for a touchdown. Although the Huskies would kick another field goal to reduce their deficit to 34–20, the Sooners would put the game away in the fourth quarter, scoring two more touchdowns to make the final score 48–20. Connecticut failed to score a single offensive touchdown in the game.

Following the game, Randy Edsall left UConn to become head coach of the Maryland Terrapins football team. He was replaced by Paul Pasqualoni.

=== 2015 St. Petersburg Bowl ===
2015 St. Petersburg Bowl
UConn Huskies	Marshall Thundering Herd
10	16
	1	2	3	4	Total
UConn	7	0	3	0	10
Marshall	7	6	0	3	16
- Date: December 26, 2015
- Season: 2015
- Stadium: Tropicana Field
- Location: St. Petersburg, Florida

UConn would fail to become bowl-eligible during Pasqualoni's three-year tenure as head coach. His replacement, Bob Diaco, following a 2–10 season in 2014, would return the Huskies to bowl eligibility in his second year with the team. The Huskies finished the regular season with a 6–6 record in 2015, highlighted by a 20–17 victory over the otherwise-undefeated Houston Cougars. Connecticut accepted a bid to play in the 2015 St. Petersburg Bowl against the Marshall Thundering Herd, who were looking to finish with at least ten wins for the third consecutive season.

Marshall scored first, on a 16-yard pass from quarterback Chase Litton to tight end Ryan Yurachek. UConn responded on the next drive, scoring on an eight-yard touchdown run by Ron Johnson. The Thundering Herd added two field goals, the second as the second quarter clock expired, to make the score 13–7 at halftime. Marshall's first three drives in the second half ended in a turnover on downs after going for it on 4th-and-2 from the Connecticut 17-yard line, a missed 43-yard field goal attempt, and an interception. Despite this, the Huskies were unable to make progress against the Herd's defense, scoring only a single field goal to cut the lead to 13–10 at the end of the third quarter. Marshall added a field goal late in the fourth quarter; after UConn's last drive ended with an incomplete pass, Marshall was able to run out the clock. The final score was 16–10 in the Herd's favor.

=== 2022 Myrtle Beach Bowl ===
2022 Myrtle Beach Bowl
Marshall Thundering Herd	UConn Huskies
28	14
	1	2	3	4	Total
Marshall	14	7	7	0	28
UConn	0	0	14	0	14
- Date: December 19, 2022
- Season: 2022
- Stadium: Brooks Stadium
- Location: Conway, South Carolina

Following a 3–9 third season with the Huskies, Diaco was terminated at the end of the 2016 season. His replacement, Randy Edsall, returning to the program after six years, would not find similar success in his second go-around. After three straight losing campaigns and a season cancelled by the COVID-19 pandemic in 2020, Edsall elected to retire after a 0–2 start in 2021.

To replace Edsall, UConn hired Jim L. Mora. In his first season with the team, Mora would lead the Huskies to a surprising 6–6 regular season record, highlighted by an upset victory over then-No. 19 Liberty. Bowl-eligible for the first time since 2015, UConn was selected to play in the 2022 Myrtle Beach Bowl against Marshall, in a rematch of their last bowl game.

The Huskies would find themselves down early, fumbling on their first offensive play to set up a Herd touchdown pass and then throwing an interception returned for a touchdown later in the quarter. After a UConn missed field goal and a Marshall touchdown run, the score was 21–0 at halftime. Marshall would extend their lead in the third quarter to 28–0, before Connecticut responded with two touchdown runs by Victor Rosa that narrowed Marshall's advantage to 28–14. The Huskies were unable to close the gap any further; after Marshall's Micah Abraham intercepted a pass in the end zone late in the fourth quarter, the Herd were able to run out the clock, leaving the final score 28–14 in Marshall's favor.

=== 2024 Fenway Bowl ===
2024 Fenway Bowl
UConn Huskies	North Carolina Tar Heels
27	14
	1	2	3	4	Total
UConn	10	14	3	0	27
North Carolina	7	0	0	7	14
- Date: December 28, 2024
- Season: 2024
- Stadium: Fenway Park
- Location: Boston, Massachusetts

After a down year in 2023, where the team went 3–9, UConn rebounded with an 8–4 regular season in 2024, their most successful performance since the 2010 team that went to the Fiesta Bowl. The Huskies were selected to play in the 2024 Fenway Bowl, against the North Carolina Tar Heels of the ACC. The Tar Heels were coming off a disappointing 6–6 regular season performance; their head coach Mack Brown was fired effective as of the end of the regular season. Although North Carolina hired Bill Belichick as their new head coach on December 11, he did not attend the Fenway Bowl; instead, interim coach Freddie Kitchens was in charge for the bowl game.

Connecticut would dominate the game in the first half, scoring three touchdowns and two field goals to take a 24–7 lead. North Carolina, whose only scoring of the first half came off of a 95-yard kickoff return by Chris Culliver, would not score offensive points until the fourth quarter. UConn quarterback Joe Fagnano was named Offensive MVP, completing 16 of 23 passes for 151 yards and two touchdowns, while UConn defensive lineman Pryce Yates was named Defensive MVP, with six tackles—three of them for a loss—and one sack.

=== 2025 Fenway Bowl ===
2025 Fenway Bowl
UConn Huskies	Army Black Knights
16	41
	1	2	3	4	Total
UConn	7	3	0	6	16
Army	7	7	13	14	41
- Date: December 27, 2025
- Season: 2025
- Stadium: Fenway Park
- Location: Boston, Massachusetts

UConn played in the Fenway Bowl under interim head coach Gordon Sammis following the departure of head coach Jim Mora after the completion of the regular season. Starting Quarterback Joe Fagnano did not play in the bowl game.

== Individual statistics ==
The below tables list the top five (including ties) performers by yardage in the indicated statistic.

References for the below statistics:

Key
Pos.	Position
QB	Quarterback
RB	Running back
FB	Fullback
WR	Wide receiver
Avg.	Average yards per run/pass/reception (Yards divided by carries/completed passes/receptions)
Long	Longest single run or reception
TD	Touchdowns
Comp.	Completed passes
Att.	Attempted passes
Pct.	Pass completion percentage (Completed passes divided by attempted passes)
Int.	Interceptions
Rec.	Receptions
GP	Games played in

=== Single game ===
==== Passing ====
Player	Pos.	Game	Comp.	Att.	Pct.	Yards	Avg.	TD	Int.
Dan Orlovsky	QB	2004 Motor City Bowl	20	41	48.8%	239	12.0	2	1
Zach Frazer	QB	2011 Fiesta Bowl	19	39	48.7%	223	11.7	0	2
Zion Turner	QB	2022 Myrtle Beach Bowl	9	27	33.3%	166	18.4	0	3
Joe Fagnano	QB	2024 Fenway Bowl	16	23	69.6%	151	9.4	2	0
Zach Frazer	QB	2010 PapaJohns.com Bowl	9	21	42.9%	107	11.9	1	0

==== Rushing ====
Player	Pos.	Game	Carries	Yards	Avg.	TD	Long
Donald Brown	RB	2009 International Bowl	29	261	9.0	1	75
Andre Dixon	RB	2010 PapaJohns.com Bowl	33	126	3.8	1	15
Jordan Todman	RB	2011 Fiesta Bowl	32	121	3.8	0	19
Cam Edwards	RB	2025 Fenway Bowl	11	108	9.8	1	34
Mel Brown	RB	2024 Fenway Bowl	11	96	8.7	0	47

==== Receiving ====
Player	Pos.	Game	Rec.	Yards	Avg.	TD	Long
Keron Henry	WR	2004 Motor City Bowl	9	109	12.1	0	44
Skyler Bell	WR	2024 Fenway Bowl	3	77	25.7	1	38
Keelan Marion	WR	2022 Myrtle Beach Bowl	2	69	34.5	0	37
Aaron Turner	WR	2022 Myrtle Beach Bowl	5	65	13.0	0	33
Anthony Sherman	FB	2011 Fiesta Bowl	3	63	21.0	0	41

==== Defense ====
The below table lists the top five (including ties) performers by most tackles made.

Player	Pos.	Game	Tackles	Interceptions (Yards)	FR (Yards)	Sacks
Maurice Lloyd	LB	2004 Motor City Bowl	18	0 (0)	0 (0)	1
Andrew Adams	S	2015 St. Petersburg Bowl	14	0 (0)	0 (0)	0
Scott Lutrus	LB	2011 Fiesta Bowl	11	0 (0)	0 (0)	0
Tyvon Branch	S	2007 Meineke Car Care Bowl	10	0 (0)	0 (0)	0
Brandon Bouyer-Randle	LB	2022 Myrtle Beach Bowl	10	0 (0)	0 (0)	0
Lee Molette III	DB	2025 Fenway Bowl	10	0 (0)	0 (0)	0

=== Bowl game career ===
==== Passing ====
Player	Pos.	GP	Comp.	Att.	Pct.	Yards	Avg.	TD	Int.
Zach Frazer	QB	2	28	60	46.7%	330	11.8	1	2
Dan Orlovsky	QB	1	20	41	48.8%	239	12.0	0	2
Zion Turner	QB	1	9	27	33.3%	166	18.4	0	3
Joe Fagnano	QB	1	16	23	69.6%	151	9.4	2	0
Tyler Lorenzen	QB	2	17	32	53.1%	147	8.6	1	1

==== Rushing ====
Player	Pos.	GP	Carries	Yards	Avg.	TD
Donald Brown	RB	2	42	333	7.9	1
Jordan Todman	RB	3	48	219	4.6	0
Cam Edwards	RB	2	28	182	6.5	2
Andre Dixon	RB	2	40	145	3.6	1
Mel Brown	RB	2	17	129	7.6	0

==== Receiving ====
Player	Pos.	GP	Rec.	Yards	Avg.	TD
Kashif Moore	WR	3	7	120	17.1	1
Keron Henry	WR	1	9	109	12.1	0
Skyler Bell	WR	1	3	77	25.7	1
Anthony Sherman	FB	2	4	74	18.5	0
Keelan Marion	WR	1	2	69	34.5	0

== See also ==
- Glossary of American football
