= Terry Richardson (American football) =

American football player (born 1971)

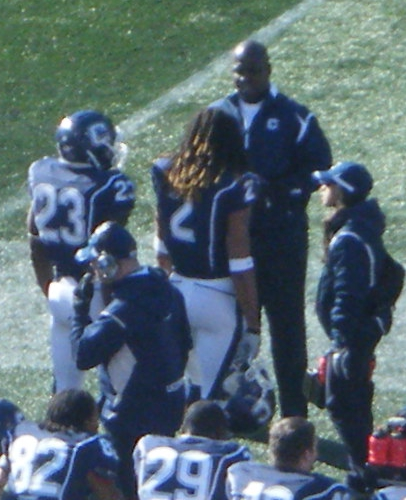
- Jordan Todman (left) and Andre Dixon (center) talking to Richardson on the sideline during the 2010 PapaJohns.com Bowl

Akron Zips
- Title: Assistant head coach & running backs coach

Personal information
- Born: October 8, 1971 (age 55); Fort Lauderdale, Florida, U.S.
- Listed height: 6 ft 0 in (1.83 m)
- Listed weight: 204 lb (93 kg)

Career information
- Position: Running back (No. 32, 44)
- High school: Northeast (Oakland Park, Florida)
- College: Syracuse (1990–1993)
- NFL draft: 1994: undrafted

Career history
- Cincinnati Bengals (1994); Kansas City Chiefs (1995)*; Philadelphia Eagles (1995)*; Rhein Fire (1996); Kansas City Chiefs (1996)*; Pittsburgh Steelers (1996)
- * Offseason or practice squad member only
- Stats at Pro Football Reference

Terry J. Richardson (born October 8, 1971) is an American football coach and former running back. He is the assistant head coach and running backs coach for the Akron Zips. He played college football for the Syracuse Orange and professionally for the Pittsburgh Steelers of the National Football League (NFL).

== Early life ==
Terry J. Richardson was born on October 8, 1971, in Fort Lauderdale, Florida. He played high school football at Northeast High School in Oakland Park, Florida, as a tailback, earning All-American honors.

== College career ==
In February 1990, Richardson committed to Syracuse University and was granted his request to wear the famous No. 44 of Syracuse. He was not credited with a letter in 1990 despite rushing for 320 yards and three touchdowns. He rushed for a team-leading 526 yards his senior year in 1993. Richardson finished his college career with 307 carries for 1,523 yards and seven touchdowns, 39 receptions for 321 yards and one touchdown, and 17 kick returns for 295 yards. He was invited to play in the 1993 Blue–Gray Football Classic. He graduated from Syracuse with a Bachelor of Science in political science.

== Professional career ==
After going undrafted in the 1994 NFL draft, Richardson signed with the Cincinnati Bengals on April 26. He was waived on October 10, 1994, before playing in any games for the Bengals.

Richardson signed a futures contract with the Kansas City Chiefs on January 3, 1995. He was waived on August 21 after the third game of the 1995 preseason.

On September 7, 1995, it was reported that Richardson had been signed to the practice squad of the Philadelphia Eagles. He was released on October 3, 1995.

Richardson played for the Rhein Fire of the World League of American Football (WLAF) during the 1996 WLAF season, rushing 36 times for 153 yards and one touchdown, catching 17 passes for 146 yards and one touchdown, and returning 15 kicks for 233 yards. He was also credited with two tackles.

After the WLAF season, Richardson signed with the Chiefs on July 3, 1996. He was waived on August 20, 1996, after the third preseason game.

Richardson was signed to the Pittsburgh Steelers' practice squad on August 24, 1996. He was promoted to the active roster on December 20 and played in the regular season finale on December 22 in a reserve role, recording five carries for 17 yards. Richardson was waived on August 24, 1997, after the final preseason game.

== Coaching career ==
Richardson was the offensive coordinator and running backs coach at his alma mater, Northeast High School, in 1998. He was then the running backs coach for the UConn Huskies from 1999 to 2010 and the Miami Hurricanes from 2011 to 2012. He was also the Hurricanes' recruiting coordinator for the state of Florida.

Richardson served as running backs coach for the Jacksonville Jaguars from 2013 to 2014 and the Maryland Terrapins in 2015. He returned to UConn in 2017, serving as the assistant head coach and running backs coach from 2017 to 2018. In 2019, he was the assistant head coach/run game coordinator and running backs coach for the Mississippi State Bulldogs.

Since 2022, Richardson has been the assistant head coach and running backs coach for the Akron Zips.
