= Larry Taylor (gridiron football) =

American gridiron football player (born 1985)

No. 25
- Positions: Wide receiver, Kick returner

Personal information
- Born: May 30, 1985 (age 41); Fort Lauderdale, Florida, U.S.
- Listed height: 5 ft 6 in (1.68 m)
- Listed weight: 177 lb (80 kg)

Career information
- College: Connecticut

Career history
- 2008–2010: Montreal Alouettes
- 2010: New York Jets*
- 2011–2013: Calgary Stampeders
- 2014: Montreal Alouettes
- 2016: Toronto Argonauts
- * Offseason or practice squad member only

Awards and highlights
- Grey Cup champion (2009); John Agro Special Teams Award (2009); 2× CFL All-Star (2009, 2013); CFL East All-Star (2009); 2× CFL West All-Star (2011, 2013)
- Stats at CFL.ca

Larry Taylor (born May 30, 1985) is an American former professional football wide receiver and kick returner. He originally signed with the Montreal Alouettes of the Canadian Football League as a free agent in 2008. He played college football for the Connecticut Huskies, where he returned punts for touchdowns in each of the Huskies' first two bowl games—the 2004 Motor City Bowl and the 2007 Meineke Car Care Bowl.

== Early life ==
Larry Taylor grew up in Fort Lauderdale, Florida. Raised by his grandmother since he was 2, Taylor was taken under wing by David Lucca and Ross Teider, fathers of football teammates, who helped him to escape from the streets and eventually transfer to Glades Day School for his junior year of high school. At Glades Day, Taylor played running back and rushed for 1,774 yards and 28 touchdowns. He averaged 11 yards per running attempt, and 42.3 yards per kickoff return. In his senior season, Taylor was the Palm Beach County offensive player of the year, Class A (small school) player of the year, and a finalist for the Mr. Football award in Florida.

Taylor's speed—measured at 4.3 seconds on the 40-yard dash—made him an attractive target for Division I football programs; his diminutive size—5 feet 6 inches (1.68 m) and 157 pounds (71 kg)—caused that interest to abate. Schools such as Tennessee and Mississippi State evaluated Taylor but eventually declined to offer a scholarship. In the end Connecticut, Eastern Michigan, and Middle Tennessee State made scholarship offers. After making his only official visit to Connecticut, Taylor opted to sign with the Huskies.

== College career ==
In 2003, UConn ranked 116th-best in punt returns, out of only 117 teams in Division I-A. Taylor played in the first game of the 2004 season, against Murray State, where he returned five punts for 74 total yards, averaging 14.8 yards per punt return. The longest return went 58 yards. Taylor would continue to return punts and a limited number of kickoffs through the game against Temple, where he returned the opening kickoff 97 yards for a touchdown but sprained his ankle, forcing him to miss the next two games. In UConn's final regular season game against Rutgers, Taylor returned a kickoff 43 yards; this return set up the touchdown that gave the Huskies the lead for good in the game. On the regular season, Taylor averaged 12.3 yards per punt return, third-best in the Big East Conference, and 28.7 yards per kickoff return, which would have led the Big East except that Taylor was two returns short of qualifying for the statistical lead. UConn improved from next-to-last in Division I-A in punt returns to 27th overall thanks to Taylor's performance. In the 2004 Motor City Bowl, the first bowl game in Connecticut history, Taylor returned a first-quarter punt 63 yards for a touchdown and averaged 44.5 yards on two kickoff returns.

Taylor was involved in a controversial play during his senior season, in a regular season game against the Louisville Cardinals. With thirteen minutes remaining in the third quarter and UConn trailing Louisville 7–0, Taylor received a 45-yard punt on the Connecticut 26-yard line. He briefly put up his right hand before catching the ball. The Louisville players slowed down and stopped, believing Taylor had made a fair catch and the play was over. Taylor took off, however, and ran all the way down the left sideline 74 yards for the touchdown. Despite the Cardinals' protests, the officials ruled that whether Taylor had signaled for a fair catch or not was not reviewable. The touchdown helped the Huskies win the game 21–17. Interviewed after the game regarding the play, Taylor was quoted as saying:

I talked to the official right before the play. I talked to the officials and he said I had to get my hand high up in the air so he could see it... I didn't really put my hand up. I was just playing a mind game with the defender... As long as it's not over your head, it's fair game. You put it over your head and the referee is going to protect you and stop [the] play.

After the game, Big East Commissioner Mike Tranghese publicly apologized to Louisville for the call, calling it a "terrible mistake". The official responsible for making the call was punished. In the offseason, the Big East worked to improve its officiating processes to prevent a call like this from happening again.

Taylor's final game with the Huskies was the 2007 Meineke Car Care Bowl. In the first quarter, he returned a punt for Connecticut's only touchdown of the game. He finished with 75 yards on three punt returns, for an average of 25 yards per return; he also returned one kickoff for 20 yards, and caught two passes for eight yards.

== Professional career ==
=== Montreal Alouettes (first stint) ===
Taylor signed with the Montreal Alouettes for the 2008 CFL season. He played with them for two years, winning the Grey Cup with the Alouettes in his second season with the team. In 2009, he was named the CFL's outstanding special teams player and an East Division All-Star, returning 89 punts for 788 total yards and two touchdowns, and 51 kickoffs for 1,059 total yards. He returned to the team at the end of the 2010 season.

=== New York Jets ===
Taylor signed with the New York Jets in the 2010 off-season. He was the shortest player in training camp when off-season workouts began. His performance in training camp caused him to become a subplot in HBO's Hard Knocks documentary series about the Jets. In the 2010 preseason, Taylor returned seven kickoffs for 175 yards and six punts for 58 yards and caught four passes. Despite this, he was cut from the team Friday, September 3 just before the last preseason game. When he cleared waivers, however, the Jets re-signed him to their practice squad. Taylor was released from the team's practice squad on October 6, 2010 following the addition of Patrick Turner.

=== Calgary Stampeders ===
On February 14, 2011, Taylor signed with the Calgary Stampeders for the 2011 CFL season. Taylor played a significant role in returning punts and kicks for 3 seasons with the Stampders. He totaled 193 punt returns for 1637 yards for an average of 8.4 yards per return (averaged 64.3 returns and 545.6 yards per season). On kickoff return he compiled 140 returns for 3055 yards, for an average return of 21.8 yards (averaged 46.6 returns and 1018.3 yards per season). On the offensive side of the ball Taylor contributed 18 rushing attempts for 84 yards, and 39 pass receptions for 321 yards, with 4 receiving touchdowns.

=== Montreal Alouettes (second stint) ===
On February 25, 2014, Taylor was traded to the Alouettes with whom he had been a member during the 2008 through 2010 CFL seasons. Taylor was sent to Montreal along with a fifth-round draft pick in the 2014 CFL draft, while Calgary received Montreal's fifth-round draft pick in 2014 and its conditional third-round pick in the 2015 CFL draft. Taylor was released by the Alouettes on May 1, 2015

=== Toronto Argonauts ===
On June 20, 2016, Taylor signed with the Toronto Argonauts. On August 27, 2016, Taylor was released by the Argonauts.

== Personal ==
Taylor is the father of three boys and a girl, Ismael Taylor, Larry Taylor Jr., Lamar Taylor, and Leah Taylor.
