= 2007 Meineke Car Care Bowl =

Connecticut Huskies	Wake Forest Demon Deacons
(9–3)	(8–4)
Big East	ACC
10	24
Head coach: Randy Edsall	Head coach: Jim Grobe
BCS 25
	1	2	3	4	Total
Connecticut	7	3	0	0	10
Wake Forest	0	0	14	10	24
- Date: December 29, 2007
- Season: 2007
- Stadium: Bank of America Stadium
- Location: Charlotte, North Carolina
- MVP: WR Kenneth Moore (Wake Forest)
- Favorite: Wake Forest by 2½
- Referee: Matt Austin (SEC)
- Attendance: 53,126

United States TV coverage
- Network: ESPN
- Announcers: Dave Pasch; Andre Ware; Quint Kessenich
- Nielsen ratings: 3.6

The 2007 Meineke Car Care Bowl, one of 27 non-BCS bowl games played after the 2007 NCAA football regular season, took place on Saturday, December 29, 2007, with a 1:00 p.m. EST kickoff at Bank of America Stadium in Charlotte, North Carolina. Wake Forest won the game, 24-10.

The Connecticut Huskies, making just their second bowl appearance in four seasons since joining the Big East entered the game as co-Big East champions after securing a 9-3 overall record. They faced the Wake Forest Demon Deacons, representing the Atlantic Coast Conference, a school located just 80 miles from Charlotte in Winston-Salem, North Carolina.

== Game summary ==
=== First quarter ===
Connecticut's Tyvon Branch received the opening kickoff from Wake Forest at Connecticut's four-yard line and advanced the ball 18 yards to the 22. After three plays UConn only gained five yards, well-short of a first down; they punted the ball back to the Demon Deacons. A penalty on the punt return gave Wake Forest the ball on their own 38-yard line. Wake earned a first down, moving as far as the Connecticut 42-yard line, but a sack by Husky defensive end Dan Davis drove them back to midfield, eventually forcing a punt. On their next possession UConn failed to gain a single yard, and once again punted. The Demon Deacons earned another first down on their next possession but again were unable to drive far beyond midfield and punted back to the Huskies.

On their next possession, the Huskies earned their first first down of the game, on a pass from quarterback Tyler Lorenzen to wide receiver Ellis Gaulden. UConn was unable to move the ball further than their own 38-yard line, however, and once again punted. The punt pinned Wake deep in their own territory, forcing them to start from their own six-yard line. The Demon Deacons after three plays were one yard short of a first down, necessitating another punt. The punt traveled 53 yards before being caught by Connecticut's Larry Taylor on the UConn 32-yard line and run back 68 yards for the touchdown. With this return and his earlier return in the 2004 Motor City Bowl, Taylor had now returned punts for touchdowns in both bowl games Connecticut had played in. After the extra point, the score was 7–0 in favor of the Huskies.

Wake Forest received the kickoff following the touchdown and returned the ball to their own 26-yard line. They began driving down the field, earning first downs on passes from quarterback Riley Skinner to receivers Kenneth Moore and Alphonso Smith. After two rushes that gained a net of three yards, the first quarter clock expired. At the end of one quarter played, Connecticut held a 7–0 lead.

=== Second quarter ===
The Demon Deacons faced a 3rd-and-7 situation at midfield as the second quarter began; after an incomplete pass, they were forced to punt. Connecticut got the ball back on their own 12-yard line and proceeded to drive toward midfield, but were stalled after Lorenzen was sacked jointly by John Russell and Stanley Arnoux on third down, forcing UConn to once again punt. Wake drove down the field all the way to the Connecticut 21-yard line, but failed to score as UConn safety Robert Vaughn intercepted a pass from Riley Skinner. The Huskies took over on their own nine-yard line and promptly gained 58 yards on a run by running back Donald Brown, moving into Wake Forest territory. Connecticut gained another first down on a pass from Lorenzen to wide receiver Brad Kanuch, but were unable to progress beyond the Demon Deacon 11-yard line. Kicker Tony Ciaravino kicked a 28-yard field goal to give UConn a 10-0 lead with five minutes left in the half.

After a touchback on the kickoff, Wake Forest began their next drive from their own 20-yard line. On first down Skinner promptly completed a 34-yard pass to wide receiver Kenneth Moore, moving the Demon Deacons into the UConn side of the field. Wake was unable to move the ball any further, however, and once again punted. Taking over at their own 13-yard line, Connecticut went three-and-out, and punted the ball back to the Demon Deacons with 1:35 left in the half. Skinner earned a first down off an eight-yard pass to wide receiver Chip Brinkman and a quarterback running play, but after a sack by Alex Polito Wake Forest was content to let the halftime clock expire. The score after two quarters was 10–0 in favor of the Huskies.

=== Third quarter ===
Wake Forest responded in the second half. Receiving the kickoff, Kenneth Moore returned the ball to the Wake 34-yard line. After a rush for no gain by Josh Adams, Riley Skinner completed four straight passes, earning two first downs and moving the Demon Deacons to the UConn 38-yard line. On the next play, running back Josh Adams took the ball all the way to the end zone, scoring on a 38-yard touchdown run. After the extra point, Wake Forest had trimmed Connecticut's lead to 10–7, with 12:30 left in the third quarter.

On the ensuing kickoff, UConn's Tyvon Branch responded with a 62-yard return to the Wake Forest 33-yard line. Two plays later, however, Connecticut's hopes of scoring were dashed when Stanley Arnoux intercepted Tyler Lorenzen's pass attempt. Behind the legs of Josh Adams and the arm of Riley Skinner, the Demon Deacons promptly moved back down the field. On 1st-and-10 from the UConn 13-yard line, Skinner completed a pass to Adams that he fumbled at the four-yard line. Connecticut linebacker Danny Lansanah recovered as the Huskies dodged a bullet. After two runs by UConn running back Andre Dixon gained a net of four yards, the Huskies were set back when Jeremy Thopson sacked Lorenzen, putting the ball back on the Connecticut one-yard line and forcing the Huskies to punt from deep within their own end zone. The Demon Deacons gained possession of the ball at the UConn 30-yard line and this time would not be denied; on 3rd-and-14 from the Connecticut 21-yard line, Riley Skinner completed a pass to tight end John Tereshinski for the go-ahead touchdown. After the extra point, Wake Forest now held their first lead of the game, at 14–10 with 3:20 left in the quarter.

UConn got the ball back on their own 37-yard line after a 26-yard kickoff return by Darius Butler. After Donald Brown rushed for one yard on first down, Tyler Lorenzen completed three straight passes, moving the Huskies into Demon Deacon territory. Facing a 2nd-and-5 from the Wake 45-yard line, Connecticut handed the ball twice to Donald Brown. He only managed to gain four yards on the two plays, putting the Huskies in a critical fourth-and-short situation as the quarter expired. After three quarters of play, Connecticut trailed Wake Forest 14–10.

=== Fourth quarter ===
Facing 4th-and-1 from the Wake Forest 41-yard line at the start of the fourth quarter, Connecticut elected to hand the ball to Donald Brown. He was stopped for no gain, and the Huskies turned the ball over on downs to the Demon Deacons. Wake Forest promptly earned two first downs, on a pass from Riley Skinner to Kenneth Moore for 14 yards and an 11-yard run by running back Micah Andrews. The Demon Deacons were stopped at the Connecticut 26-yard line; kicker Sam Swank connected on a 43-yard field goal, expanding the Wake Forest lead to 17–10 with 11:44 left in the fourth quarter.

Gaining possession of the ball at the Wake Forest 33-yard line, Tyler Lorenzen elected to take matters into his own hands. He ran the ball three straight times for six, five, and twelve yards, earning two first downs and moving into Demon Deacon territory. On 1st-and-10 from the Wake 44-yard line, Lorenzen completed a five-yard pass to wide receiver Terence Jeffers. He then threw three straight incompletions, with the last pass attempt being broken up by the player who had intercepted him earlier: Stanley Arnoux. Connecticut once again turned the ball over on downs. Riley Skinner and Wake Forest took over; after two incomplete passes, Skinner found Kenneth Moore for a gain of 18 yards and a first down. Wake however was able to advance no further, and punted the ball back to UConn. After Andre Dixon lost five yards on a first down run, Lorenzen completed three straight passes. The last, however, to Donald Brown, lost seven yards and set up a 2nd-and-17. After two incomplete passes, Connecticut was forced to punt yet again, with just over four minutes left in the game. This time, Wake was determined not to give Connecticut another chance. After an incomplete pass and a three-yard run, the Demon Deacons faced a 3rd-and-7 situation. Riley Skinner took off, gaining 19 yards and a first down and forcing UConn to use their final timeout after the ensuing first down play. On 2nd-and-14, Micah Andrews ran for 30 yards to the Connecticut 15. Instead of allowing the clock to expire giving themselves the win, Wake elected to call two timeouts over the next three plays. Micah Andrews ran for a touchdown with under one minute left to play in the game. The Huskies would get the ball back with 23 seconds left in the game, but after three incomplete passes by backup quarterback Dennis Brown, the clock expired. Wake Forest won the game, 24–10.

=== Scoring summary ===
Scoring summary

Quarter	Time	Drive			Team	Scoring information	Score	
Quarter	Time	Plays	Yards	TOP	Team	Scoring information	UCONN	WF
1	02:38		68	0:00	UCONN	Larry Taylor 68-yard touchdown punt return, Tony Ciaravino kick good	7	0
2	05:00		80	2:21	UCONN	29-yard field goal by Tony Ciaravino	10	0
3	12:44		66	2:08	WF	Josh Adams 38-yard touchdown run, Sam Swank kick good	10	7
3	03:27		30	2:31	WF	John Tereshinski 20-yard touchdown reception from Riley Skinner, Sam Swank kick good	10	14
4	11:53		33	3:01	WF	43-yard field goal by Sam Swank	10	17
4	00:29		63	3:36	WF	Micah Andrews 9-yard touchdown run, Sam Swank kick good	10	24
"TOP" = time of possession. For other American football terms, see Glossary of American football.							10	24

== Final statistics ==
Statistical comparison
	Wake	UConn
1st downs	23	9
Total yards	412	213
Passing yards	268	98
Rushing yards	144	115
Penalties	1–6	2–30
3rd down conversions	8–16	5–17
4th down conversions	0–0	0–2
Turnovers	2	1
Time of possession	34:51	25:09

For his performance in the 2007 Meineke Car Care Bowl, Wake Forest wide receiver Kenneth Moore was named player of the game. He led all receivers in yardage with 112 yards on 11 receptions. He set a new ACC single-second reception record with 98 on the season; the previous record, 88, was held by Torry Holt of North Carolina State.

== See also ==
- Glossary of American football
- American football positions
