= 2010 PapaJohns.com Bowl =

College football bowl game

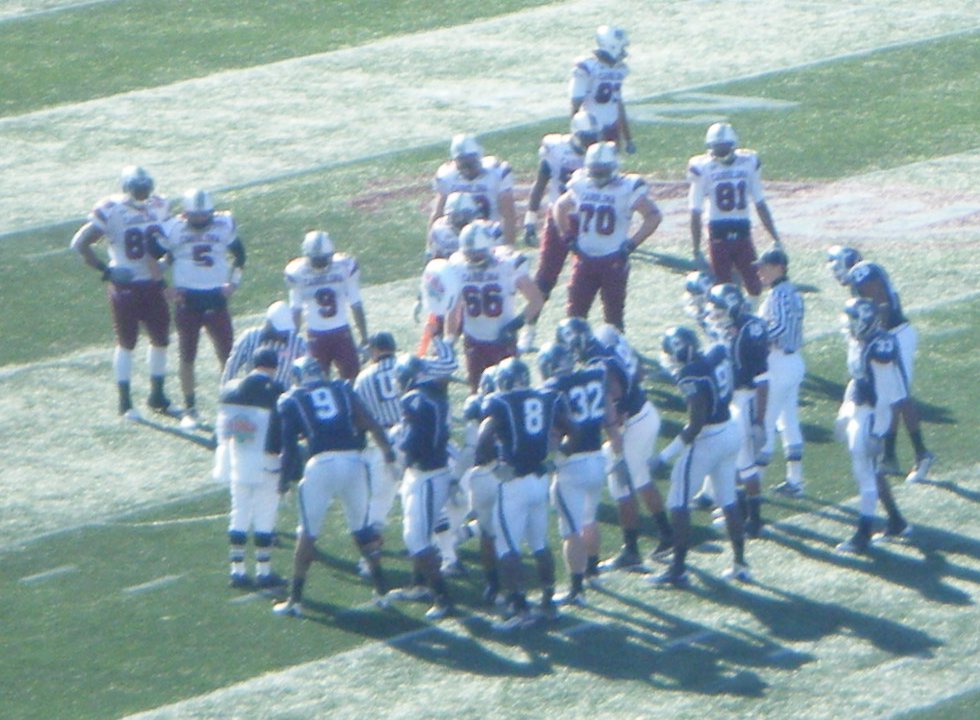
- South Carolina and Connecticut players watch as the officials measure for a first down.
South Carolina Gamecocks	Connecticut Huskies
(7–5)	(7–5)
SEC	Big East
7	20
Head coach: Steve Spurrier	Head coach: Randy Edsall
	1	2	3	4	Total
South Carolina	0	0	0	7	7
Connecticut	10	3	0	7	20
- Date: January 2, 2010
- Season: 2009
- Stadium: Legion Field
- Location: Birmingham, Alabama, US
- MVP: RB Andre Dixon
- Referee: Ron Cherry (Atlantic Coast Conference)
- Attendance: 45,254
- Payout: US$900,000 (SEC), $600,000 (Big East)

United States TV coverage
- Network: ESPN
- Announcers: Dave Neal, Andre Ware, Cara Capuano

The 2010 PapaJohns.com Bowl was a postseason college football bowl game between the South Carolina Gamecocks of the Southeastern Conference (SEC) and the Connecticut Huskies (UConn) of the Big East Conference, on January 2, 2010, at Legion Field in Birmingham, Alabama, United States. The game was the final contest of the 2009 NCAA Division I-Football Bowl Subdivision (Division I-FBS) football season for both teams, and it ended in a 20–7 victory for Connecticut.

South Carolina had a 7–5 regular-season, highlighted by wins over then-No. 4 (Note: All rankings are based on the Associated Press (AP) Poll unless otherwise noted.) Mississippi and then-No. 15 Clemson. The Gamecocks faced Connecticut. The Huskies were selected to play in the 2010 PapaJohns.com Bowl following a tumultuous 7–5 regular season that included five losses by a total of just fifteen points, a double-overtime victory at Notre Dame, and the murder of cornerback Jasper Howard. Pregame coverage focused on the tragedy that marked the Huskies' season, as well as on head coaches Steve Spurrier of South Carolina and Randy Edsall of Connecticut.

Connecticut scored twice in the first quarter: on a one-handed 37-yard touchdown reception by wide receiver Kashif Moore and then on a 33-yard field goal after South Carolina failed to convert a fourth-down play at its 32-yard line. Running back Andre Dixon scored for UConn on a 10-yard rush early in the fourth quarter. South Carolina scored its sole touchdown after the game had effectively been decided, on a two-yard run by Brian Maddox.

Dixon was named player of the game, and finished with 126 rushing yards and one touchdown. Connecticut wide receiver Marcus Easley and South Carolina linebacker Eric Norwood were among four players from the teams to be selected in the subsequent 2010 National Football League (NFL) draft.

== Team selection ==
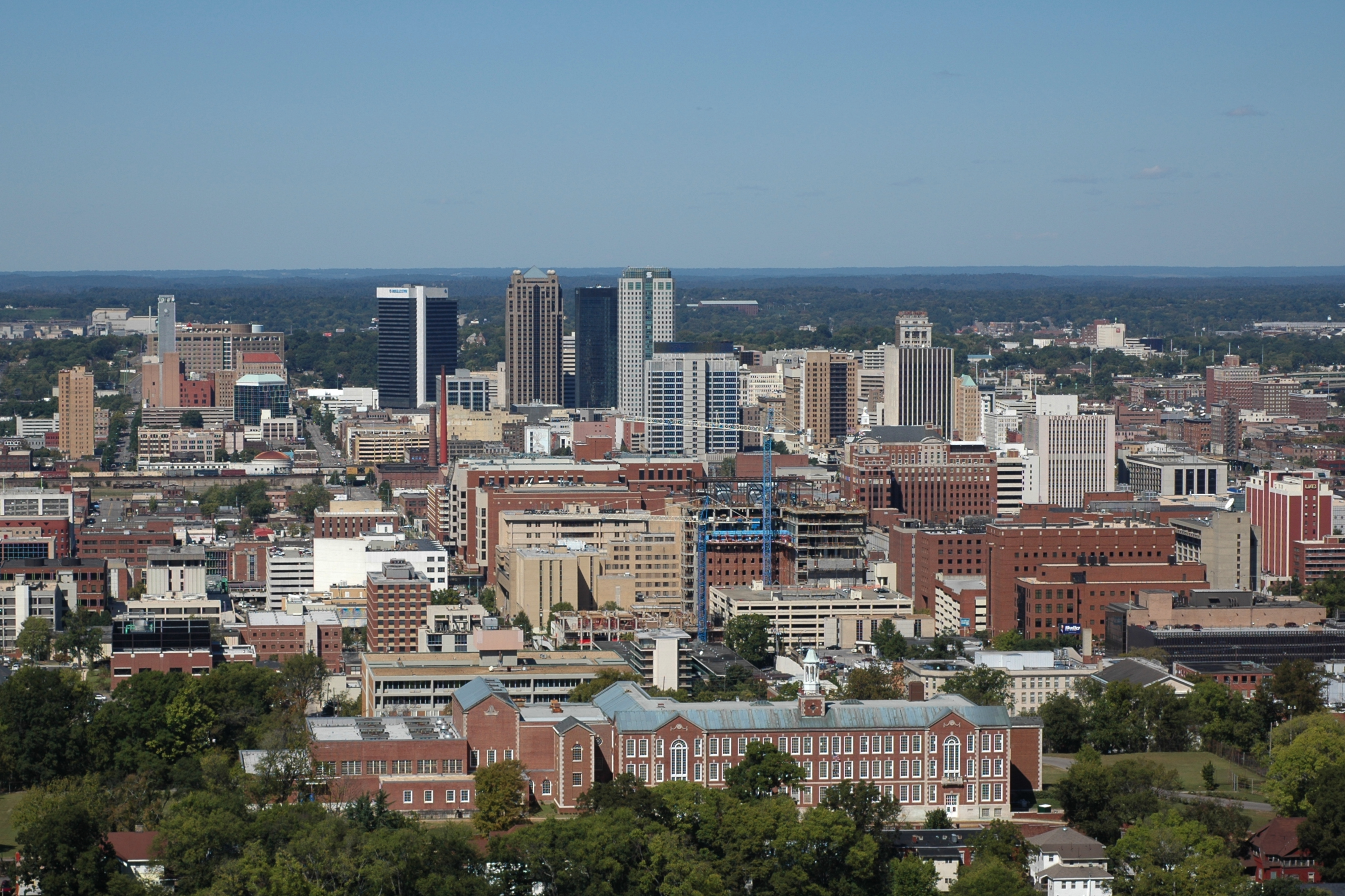
Birmingham, Alabama, home of the PapaJohns.com Bowl

In 2010, the PapaJohns.com Bowl selection committee had a contractual arrangement with the Big East and SEC conferences that allowed the committee to pick one team from each conference. The Big East had a contractual bowl bid to the game since its inception in 2006. The SEC agreed to send its ninth bowl-eligible team to the bowl starting in 2008, but did not have enough bowl-eligible teams in either 2008 or 2009 to take advantage of the bid. In 2010, the SEC received $900,000 for sending a team to the game, while the Big East received $600,000.

The Big East's contract with the bowl committee stated that the group would make its selection in coordination with the International Bowl and the St. Petersburg Bowl after other Big East-affiliated bowl games made their selections. Conference champion Cincinnati was awarded an automatic Bowl Championship Series (BCS) berth in the 2010 Sugar Bowl. The Gator Bowl had the first pick after the BCS, and selected West Virginia. (Note: The Gator Bowl and Sun Bowl technically shared the second pick of Big East teams, although the Gator Bowl was actually committed to making the selection. The bowls had signed a contract in 2006 that allowed the Gator Bowl to select a Big 12 team two times and a Big East team—or Notre Dame, which counted as a Big East team for the purposes of the contract—two times over a four-year period; the Sun Bowl would then select a team from the conference that was not picked from by the Gator Bowl. Over the past three years, the Sun Bowl had selected a Big East team twice and the Gator Bowl had selected one once. NCAA regulations that forced 7–5 teams to be selected before 6–6 teams prevented the Gator Bowl from selecting Notre Dame; they opted to select West Virginia.) The Meineke Car Care Bowl, which had the next selection, considered both Pittsburgh, which had the better regular-season record, and Rutgers, whose fans had a better traveling reputation; it selected Pittsburgh.

Three bowl-eligible Big East teams remained: Connecticut, Rutgers, and South Florida. The previous two years, Rutgers had played in the 2008 International Bowl and the 2008 PapaJohns.com Bowl. In the same period, South Florida played in the 2007 PapaJohns.com Bowl and the 2008 St. Petersburg Bowl. Connecticut had played in the 2009 International Bowl the previous year. In general, bowl games and conferences prefer to have different teams play in each game each year. Partly because of this, Rutgers went to the 2009 St. Petersburg Bowl, South Florida to the 2010 International Bowl, and Connecticut to the 2010 PapaJohns.com Bowl.

For Connecticut's opponent, the PapaJohns.com Bowl had the right to select a SEC team, but only after all other bowls with contracts with the SEC made their selections. Conference champion Alabama finished No. 1 in the BCS standings and earned a berth to the 2010 BCS National Championship Game. Conference championship game loser Florida took the SEC champion's automatic slot in the 2010 Sugar Bowl, vacant since Alabama was selected to appear in the national championship game. The Capital One Bowl had the next selection and opted for Louisiana State University (LSU). The Cotton Bowl and Outback Bowl selected Ole Miss and Auburn respectively. (Note: The Cotton Bowl Classic and Outback Bowl shared the selection; the Cotton Bowl Classic had the right to select first from the SEC West division, and the Outback Bowl had first rights to the SEC East division. If either bowl wished to select from the other division, it had to let the bowl with first rights to that division have the first selection. In 2010, both bowls selected teams from the West division; the Cotton Bowl selected Ole Miss and the Outback Bowl picked Auburn.) The Chick-fil-A Bowl, which had the next pick, selected Tennessee. The next selections were shared by the Liberty Bowl and Music City Bowl, which opted for Arkansas and Kentucky, respectively. The Independence Bowl, with the next-to-last selection, picked Georgia, leaving the PapaJohns.com Bowl with the last available bowl-eligible SEC team, South Carolina.

The game was the first meeting between the two schools and the first PapaJohns.com Bowl appearance for each. The game was the 30th anniversary of South Carolina's last postseason game at Legion Field, in the December 1979 Hall of Fame Classic, and it was the 20th anniversary of head coach Steve Spurrier's last Legion Field bowl game, with Duke in the December 1989 All-American Bowl.

=== South Carolina ===
The South Carolina Gamecocks went 7–6 in 2008, losing their final three games, including the 2009 Outback Bowl against Iowa, by a combined score of 118–30. Steve Spurrier was named head coach of the Gamecocks in 2005; in his four seasons in charge of the program, the team had a combined record of 28–21 and was bowl-eligible every year.

==== Early season ====
South Carolina opened its 2009 season with a win against North Carolina State. Their next game, against No. 21 Georgia, featured a kickoff returned for a touchdown, an interception returned for a touchdown, a safety, a blocked extra point attempt, and 24 penalties. In the end, quarterback Stephen Garcia's pass on 4th-and-4 from the 7-yard line with 22 seconds remaining was batted down by the defense and fell incomplete, preserving a 41–37 win for Georgia. South Carolina proceeded to beat Florida Atlantic 38–16.

In their next contest, South Carolina faced No. 4 Mississippi, and came away with a 16–10 upset; the Gamecocks had lost their previous 22 games against AP top 5 teams. Next up was a win against in-state Division I-FCS opponent South Carolina State With the victory, the Gamecocks earned their first Top 25 ranking of the 2009 season, appearing in the AP Poll at No. 25. South Carolina finished the first half of their season against SEC opponent Kentucky. Defensive end Cliff Matthews knocked down Kentucky's pass attempt on what would have been a game-tying two-point conversion to preserve the 28–26 win. After six games, the Gamecocks had a record of 5–1 overall, 2–1 in the SEC, and were a consensus No. 22 in the AP, Coaches', and Harris polls.

==== Late season ====
After winning five of their first six games, the Gamecocks proceeded to lose four of their next five. Against No. 2 Alabama, eventual Heisman Trophy-winning running back Mark Ingram II ran for a then-career record 246 yards and a touchdown; South Carolina lost 20–6. The defeat dropped the Gamecocks to No. 23 in the AP and Coaches' polls, and out of the Harris poll altogether; in the first BCS standings released that week, the Gamecocks were ranked 24th. South Carolina came back to beat Vanderbilt 14–10; the Gamecocks rose to No. 21 in all three polls, and No. 22 in the following week's BCS standings. The next game, against Tennessee, was never close; South Carolina fell behind 21–0 early in the second quarter and lost 31–13. The loss caused the Gamecocks to fall out of all three polls as well as the BCS standings. South Carolina then faced Arkansas, who scored 23 unanswered points on their way to delivering the Gamecocks a 33–16 loss. The following game was against No. 1 Florida, who was undefeated. South Carolina was within three points of Florida as the fourth quarter began, but Garcia was subsequently sacked four times and intercepted twice; Florida won 24–14. The Gamecocks' record fell to 6–5 overall, 3–5 within the SEC.

After a bye week, South Carolina closed out their regular season with a game against their fierce in-state rivals, the No. 15 Clemson Tigers, who had already clinched a berth in the 2009 ACC Championship Game the next week. Clemson star running back C. J. Spiller returned the opening kickoff for a touchdown; he was held to 18 yards rushing the rest of the game. The Gamecocks scored 24 unanswered points to take a 24–7 lead through three quarters, and matched the Tigers the rest of the way to win 34–17. This win gave South Carolina a final regular season record of 7–5 overall, 3–5 in the SEC.

=== Connecticut ===
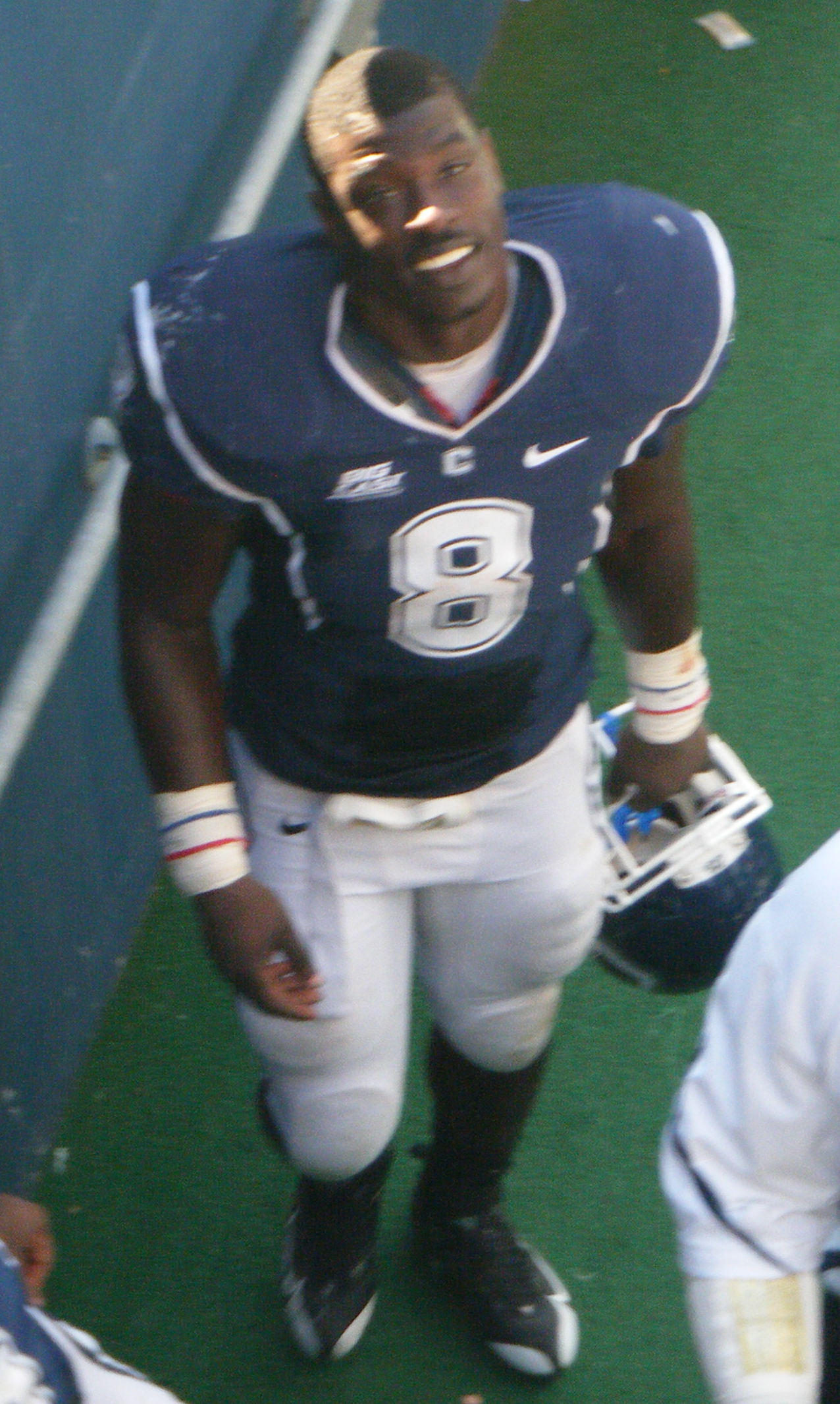
Connecticut linebacker Lawrence Wilson

The Connecticut Huskies finished 8–5 in 2008, ending the season with a victory in the 2009 International Bowl. The departure of running back Donald Brown—the NCAA rushing leader in 2008—as well as three other Huskies selected in the first two rounds of the 2009 NFL draft, was expected to hurt the team. In the Big East preseason media poll, the Huskies were picked to finish sixth in the conference.

==== Early season ====
The Huskies opened the 2009 season at Ohio University, and never trailed in the game, winning 23–16. UConn's next game was its home opener, versus No. 19 North Carolina. Connecticut led 10–0 through three quarters, but North Carolina tied the game with 2:36 left and took the lead when UConn was called for a holding penalty in its end zone, which by rule resulted in a safety. North Carolina won the game 12–10. Connecticut rebounded in its next game at Baylor, winning 30–22; they then faced Division I-Football Championship Subdivision (Division I-FCS) opponent Rhode Island, an historic rival of the team, and defeated them 52–10.

The Huskies opened Big East conference play at the Pittsburgh Panthers. UConn held a 21–6 lead with less than four minutes left in the third quarter, but Pittsburgh rallied to win with a field goal as time expired. Connecticut closed the first half of its season versus Big East opponent Louisville on homecoming weekend. In the third quarter, with UConn leading 21–13, Louisville running back Bilal Powell ran off left tackle near the end zone. He was caught by cornerback Jasper Howard, who forced a fumble. Connecticut kicked a field goal on the ensuing drive and won the game 38–25, giving the Huskies a 4–2 overall record, 1–1 within the Big East conference.

==== Jasper Howard murder ====
Later that night, Howard and several other UConn football players were at a dance at the Student Union Center on the Connecticut campus. At 12:26 am a fire alarm sounded, forcing the evacuation of the building. As the students exited, an altercation broke out between a group of UConn football players and a group of non-students. The attackers brandished knives and stabbed Howard before fleeing. Howard was taken by ambulance to Windham Community Memorial Hospital, and then evacuated by helicopter to St. Francis Hospital in Hartford, where he was pronounced dead. Coach Randy Edsall was summoned to identify the body. Howard's murder was the first homicide on UConn's campus in more than thirty years.

Connecticut's next game, one week after Howard's death, was at West Virginia. In a close-run game, Connecticut lost 28–24 after West Virginia responded to the Huskies' late go-ahead score with one of its own. Two days after the game, the entire UConn team traveled to Howard's hometown of Miami, Florida, for his funeral. The next game, the first at Rentschler Field since Howard's death, was against Rutgers. Connecticut came back in the fourth quarter to take a 24–21 lead with 38 seconds remaining; Rutgers completed an 81-yard touchdown pass one play later to win 28–24. UConn also lost the following game, 47–45, at undefeated No. 5 Cincinnati. After three straight losses, the Huskies' record dropped to 4–5 overall; 1–4 in the Big East. The losses to this point were by a combined total of 15 points.

==== Late season ====
Connecticut's next game was a nationally televised appearance at the Notre Dame Fighting Irish. The Irish scored two touchdowns early but the Huskies responded with a touchdown and a field goal. Notre Dame expanded its lead to 17–10 in the third quarter, but Todman ran back the ensuing kickoff 96 yards for a game-tying touchdown. In the fourth quarter, Notre Dame once again took the lead on a 23-yard field goal; after two touchdown-scoring running plays were negated by holding penalties, Connecticut tied the score on a 29-yard field goal with 1:10 left, sending the game into overtime. The teams traded touchdowns in the first overtime, and the Huskies won the game with a touchdown in the second overtime. Edsall said the game was the "best win" in UConn football history.

Connecticut finished the regular season by beating Syracuse and South Florida at home. The South Florida game, played as snow fell on Rentschler Field, was won on a last-second 42-yard field goal by kicker Dave Teggart. The two wins gave UConn a final regular season record of 7–5 overall, 3–4 in the Big East. They finished in a three-way tie with Rutgers and South Florida for fourth place in the conference.

== Pregame buildup ==
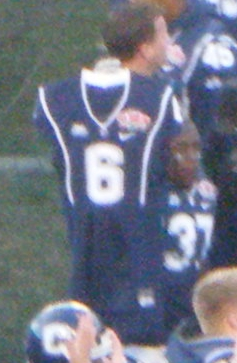
Jersey of Jasper Howard, held aloft

In the weeks preceding the game, media coverage focused on the tragic circumstances surrounding the Huskies' season. On December 21, 2010, the team was declared the winner of the 2009 FedEx Orange Bowl/FWAA Courage Award, given to a person or team who displayed courage on or off the field, overcame injury or physical handicap, prevented a disaster, or lived through hardship. The award was presented at the 2010 Orange Bowl on January 5, 2011, following the PapaJohns.com Bowl.

Edsall was praised for coaching the Huskies to a successful season despite the off-field distractions. By appearing in the 2010 PapaJohns.com Bowl, UConn made its third straight bowl appearance and fourth since joining the Big East for the 2004 season. There were rumors that Edsall was a candidate for the Notre Dame head coaching position, vacated by the firing of Charlie Weis. On December 11, Cincinnati coach Brian Kelly was given the Notre Dame job; Edsall remained with Connecticut.

Pregame coverage also discussed the performance of Steve Spurrier as head coach of South Carolina. His Gamecock teams had been competitive in the SEC, but were unable to win championships; during his tenure to that point, they had finished no higher than second in the SEC East division. Nevertheless, analysts described him as one of "the game's better minds and motivators" and "still one of the craftiest coaches around". The 2010 PapaJohns.com Bowl marked Spurrier's return to Birmingham; in the United States Football League he competed against the local Birmingham Stallions as head coach of the Tampa Bay Bandits from 1983 to 1985. Legion Field was also the home of the 1992 and 1993 SEC Championship Games; teams coached by Spurrier participated in both contests.

=== Offensive matchups ===
==== South Carolina offense ====
The Gamecocks struggled offensively for most of 2009, ranking only 76th in total offense and 96th in scoring. Their offense was quarterbacked by Stephen Garcia. A highly touted prospect coming out of high school, Garcia had a breakout season in 2009, finishing second in the SEC with 2,733 passing yards—more than former Heisman Trophy-winning Florida quarterback Tim Tebow—and 17 touchdowns against nine interceptions. Freshman wide receiver Alshon Jeffery was Garcia's most frequent passing target; he caught 43 passes for 735 yards and six touchdowns. Although South Carolina's passing attack had success, its running game was the worst in the SEC and 91st nationally. The Gamecocks' offensive line struggled, ranking 104th in sacks allowed. It did not help matters that Eric Wolford, the running game coordinator and offensive line coach, left the team before the bowl game to become head coach at Youngstown State.

==== Connecticut offense ====
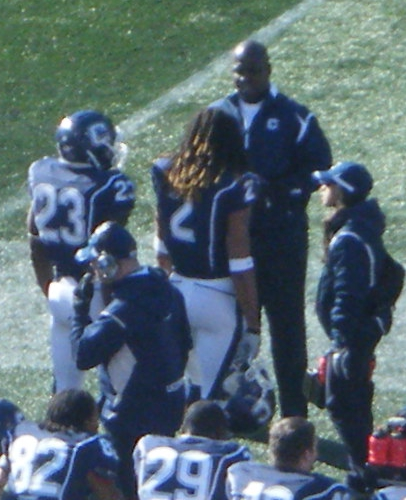
Todman (left) and Dixon (center) talk to running backs coach Terry Richardson on the sideline

The Connecticut offense was led by the rushing attack of running backs Jordan Todman and Andre Dixon, who were described as "one of the best running-back tandems in the nation". The two combined for 27 touchdowns and more than 2,100 rushing yards during the regular season. South Carolina linebacker Eric Norwood described Todman as a speedy back, with "that burst and that breakaway speed to go with it", and compared him to Clemson running back C. J. Spiller. In contrast, Norwood described Dixon as a "taller, more downhill back, vertical guy".

In previous seasons, UConn had been largely dependent on running the ball; the team developed more balance in 2009, ranking 41st of 120 Division I FBS teams nationally in rushing offense and 46th in passing. Marcus Easley's emergence as a productive wide receiver was key to the development of the Huskies' passing attack. A former walk-on who entered the season with only five career receptions, he led Connecticut in receiving in 2009 with 44 catches for 853 yards and eight touchdowns. Quarterback Zach Frazer was inconsistent in the early season. He was injured in the game against North Carolina, but regained his starting role after backup Cody Endres was hurt in the Rutgers game later in the season. In UConn's four games before the bowl, Frazer performed well; he threw six touchdown passes against only two interceptions and helped the Huskies score an average of 41 points per game. Experts felt Frazer would need to have a good performance for Connecticut to have a chance to win.

=== Defensive matchups ===
==== South Carolina defense ====
South Carolina had a strong defense, especially against the pass; the Gamecocks were 15th in the nation in total defense, 22nd in scoring defense, 46th in run defense, and 12th in passing defense. The Gamecock defense was led by linebacker Eric Norwood. Described as "one of the most disruptive defenders in the country", Norwood was a three-time All-SEC selection and had compiled seven sacks on the season, tied for third-best in the conference. He was South Carolina's all-time leader in both sacks and tackles-for-loss.

==== Connecticut defense ====
Connecticut had a weaker defense in 2010 than in previous seasons. The Huskies were 72nd in total defense, 60th in scoring defense, 48th against the run, and 94th against the pass. UConn's pass defense was hurt by the loss of Jasper Howard; following his death, freshman cornerback Blidi Wreh-Wilson was forced into the starting lineup alongside senior Robert McClain. Top performers for the Connecticut defense included defensive end Lindsey Witten, who led the Big East with 11.5 sacks, and linebacker Lawrence Wilson, who led the Big East and was fourth in the nation with 136 tackles, averaging over 11 per game.

== Game summary ==
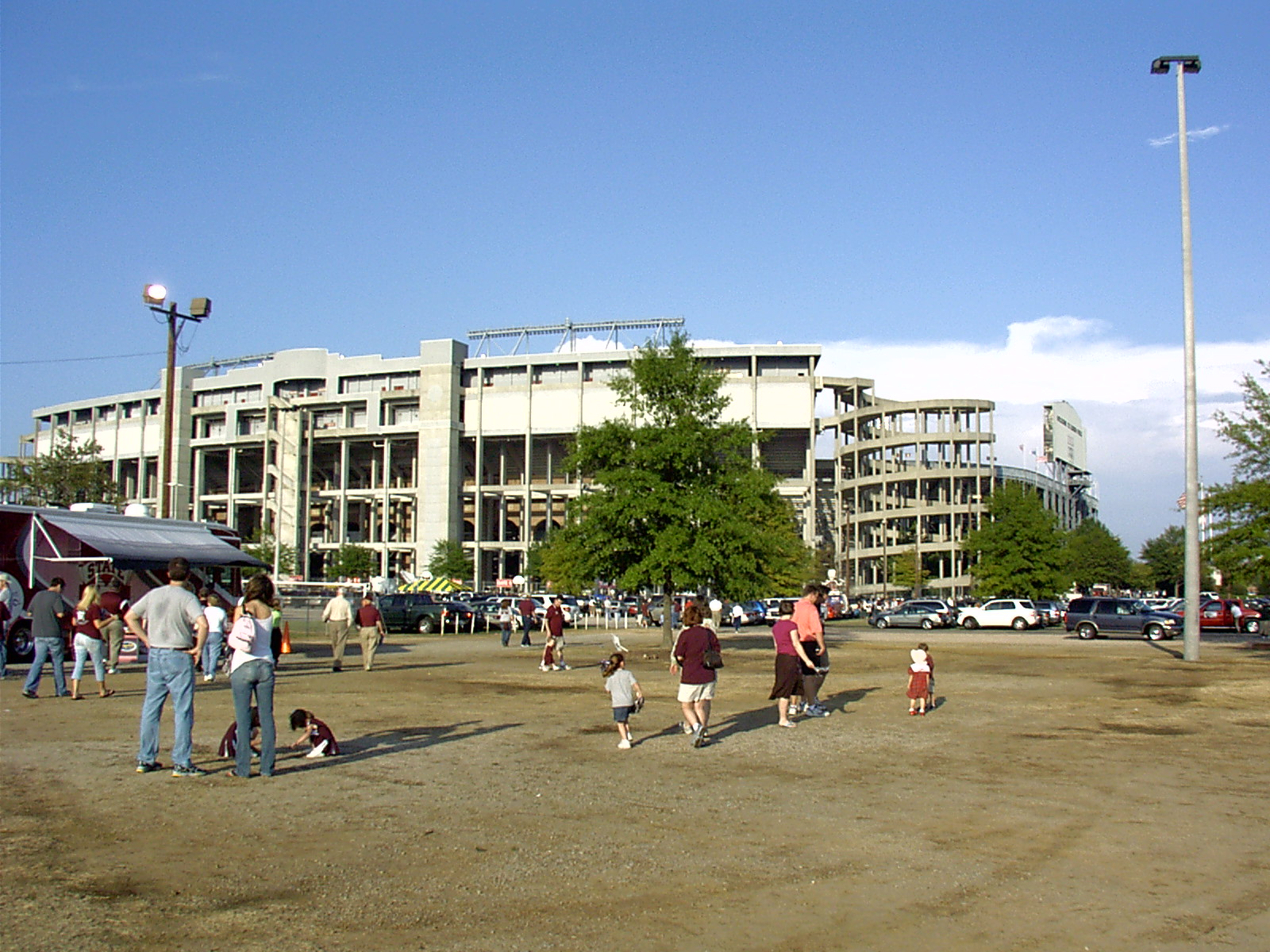
Legion Field (pictured in 2006) was the site of the 2010 PapaJohns.com Bowl.

The game started at 1:04 pm CST on Saturday, January 2, 2010, at Legion Field in Birmingham, Alabama. Official attendance for the game was 45,254. The Gamecocks sold 8,593 tickets of their 10,000-ticket allotment; South Carolina coach Steve Spurrier estimated about 30,000 of the fans in attendance supported the Gamecocks. UConn sold or distributed only 4,500 of its 10,000 tickets for the game. The game was telecast on ESPN, with Dave Neal and Andre Ware in the broadcasting booth and Cara Capuano reporting from the sidelines. The temperature at kickoff was around 35 °F (2 °C), abnormally cold for Birmingham at that time of year. Game officials were:

Position	Name
Referee (R)	Ron Cherry
Umpire (U)	Rich McMahan
Head linesman (H)	Troy Gray
Line judge (L)	Todd Lapenta
Back judge (B)	Barry Hendon
Field judge (F)	Jeff Heaser
Side judge (S)	Vince Parker

=== First quarter ===
Connecticut kicked off to South Carolina to begin the game. The Gamecocks gained only a single yard in three plays on their first possession, forcing them to punt. UConn proceeded to also gain only one yard and punt. After another Gamecock punt, the Huskies took over at their own 34 and made a first down—the first of the game—after three consecutive Dixon rushing plays. Two completed passes to Marcus Easley earned Connecticut a second first down, moving them to the South Carolina 39-yard line. After a two-yard Jordan Todman run and an incomplete pass, Zach Frazer threw a pass down the right sideline ahead of Kashif Moore. Reaching out, Moore made a one-handed running catch into the end zone for the first touchdown of the game. After the extra point conversion, Connecticut led 7–0 with 6:37 left in the quarter.

South Carolina regained possession on their 26-yard line following the kickoff, but was only able to advance nine yards in three plays. Rather than punt, the Gamecocks attempted to gain a first down on 4th-and-1 at the 32-yard line. Steven Garcia's quarterback sneak was stopped for no gain by the UConn defense, returning the ball to Connecticut on loss of downs. The Huskies began their next drive in a favorable position due to the Gamecocks' turnover on downs. A 16-yard run by Todman advanced the ball to the South Carolina 16-yard line, where Connecticut's offense was stymied by South Carolina's defense. Dave Teggart made a 33-yard field goal, giving the Huskies a 10–0 lead with 3:35 left in the quarter. On the ensuing possession, South Carolina again went three-and-out, punting the ball to Connecticut. The Huskies began driving down the field, collecting two first downs before the first quarter ended. At the end of the first quarter, UConn held a 10–0 lead.

=== Second quarter ===
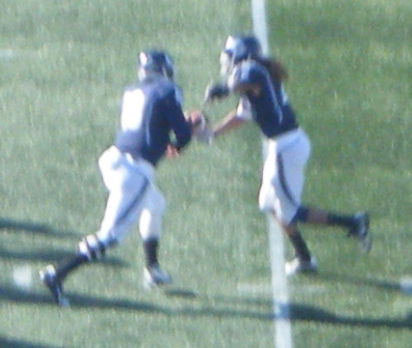
Zach Frazer hands off to Andre Dixon

Beginning the second quarter with a 1st-and-10 at their 44-yard line, Connecticut failed to make progress and punted. After the Gamecocks again went three-and-out and punted, the Huskies tried a trick pass from Todman to Easley that fell incomplete. After that, the Huskies advanced the ball off short runs by Dixon and Todman, and passes from Frazer to Easley and Moore. South Carolina stopped UConn's drive at the 27-yard line; Connecticut settled for a 44-yard field goal that extended its lead to 13–0.

Garcia led the Gamecocks on their next drive, either passing or rushing himself on every play except the last. After a first-down sack by Kendall Reyes pushed South Carolina back to its 18-yard line, the Gamecocks advanced the ball to the Connecticut 35-yard line. On 4th-and-10, Stephen Flint was tackled nine yards behind the line of scrimmage, returning the ball to UConn on loss of downs. The two teams traded punts until halftime; Connecticut still held a 13–0 lead.

=== Third quarter ===
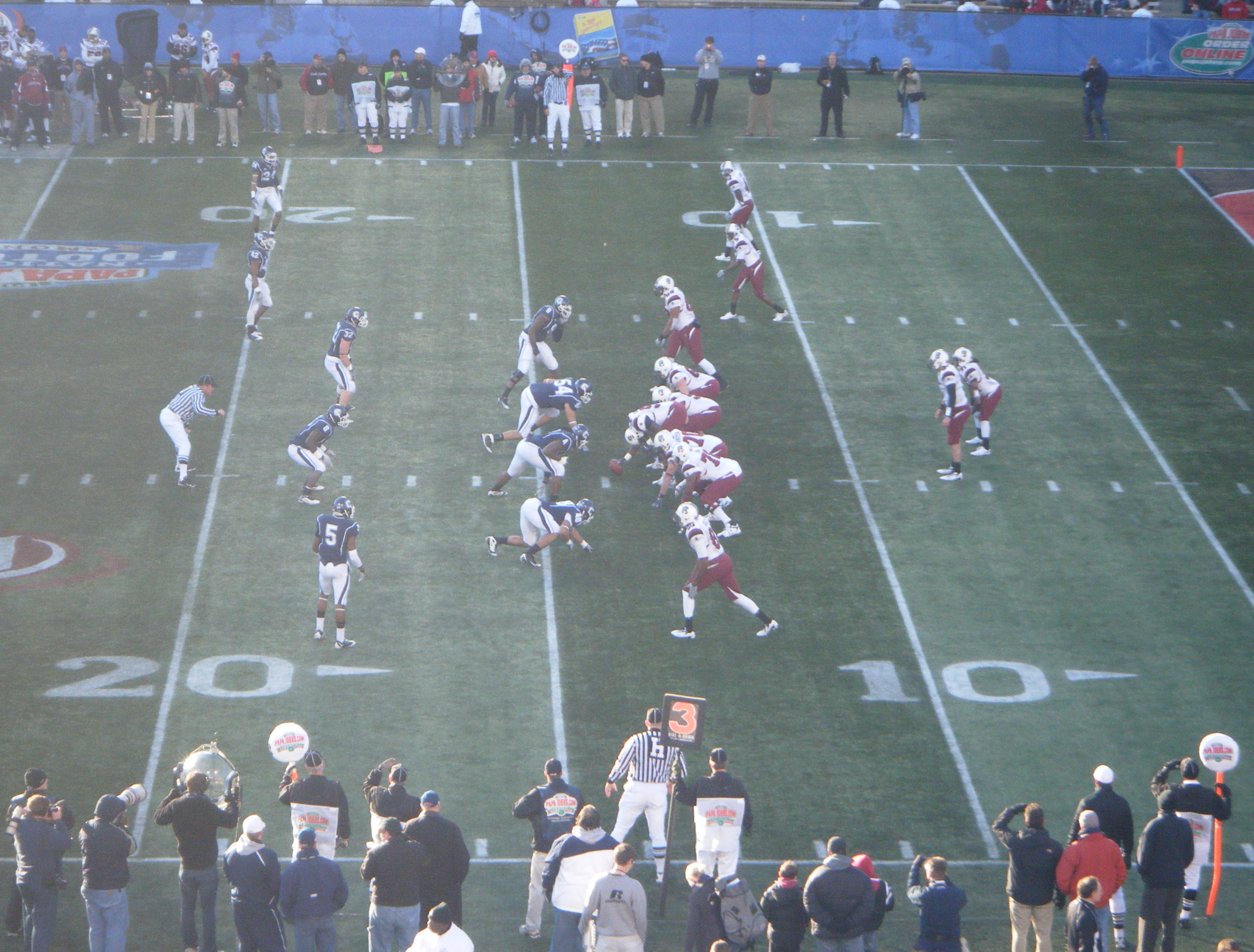
South Carolina on offense in the third quarter

The Huskies received the ball to start the half, but were unable to obtain a first down after three straight running plays. UConn punted; South Carolina was called for roughing the kicker, (Note: The penalty is called "roughing the kicker" even though the player being fouled is the punter, rather than the placekicker.) giving Connecticut a first down after the penalty. After two plays netted no yardage, UConn threw a pass on 3rd-and-10 that fell incomplete. The Gamecocks were called for a personal foul, again giving the Huskies a first down. Connecticut advanced the ball to the South Carolina 26-yard line, but Frazer fumbled; the ball was recovered by South Carolina.

The Gamecocks responded with a drive that earned two first downs. After a sack on third down by Lawrence Wilson, South Carolina punted. The Gamecocks got the ball back on their 8-yard line after the Huskies went three-and-out. After two first downs and a 15-yard personal foul penalty against it, South Carolina faced a 1st-and-10 on its 26-yard line. Garcia fumbled, and the ball was recovered by Scott Lutrus of UConn at the 35-yard line. Four Dixon rushing plays advanced the ball to the 24-yard line; the quarter expired with the Huskies leading 13–0 and in good position to expand their margin.

=== Fourth quarter ===
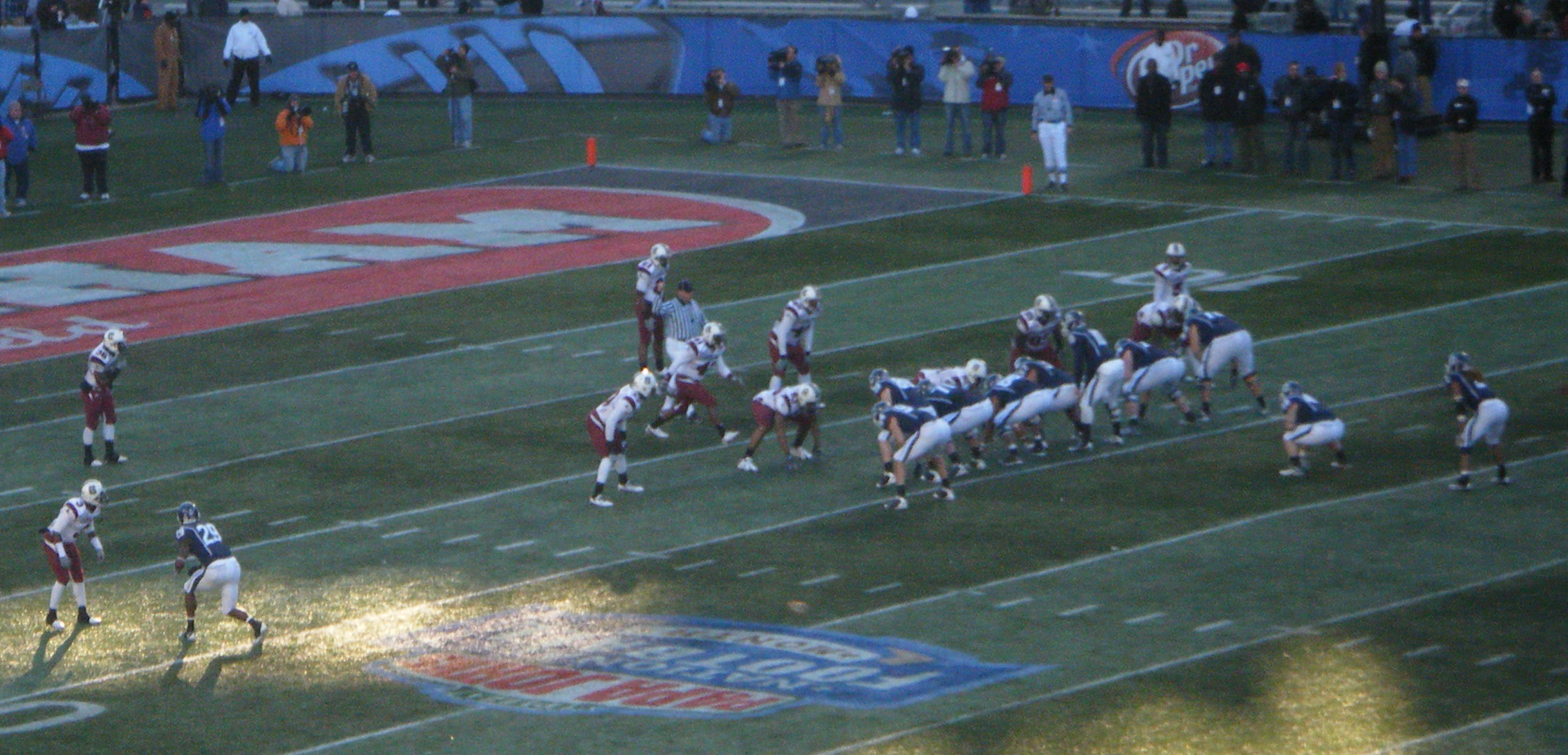
Connecticut on offense in the fourth quarter

Less than two minutes into the fourth quarter, UConn struck again. On his fifth run of the quarter, Dixon rushed into the end zone from ten yards out, giving Connecticut a 20–0 lead and effectively putting the game away as South Carolina would need three scores to take the lead. The two teams exchanged three-and-outs before South Carolina began a drive that penetrated Connecticut territory; however, South Carolina was soon pushed back to its 47-yard-line. On 4th-and-19, Garcia threw a deep pass that was intercepted by safety Robert Vaughn on the UConn 7-yard line.

After three Dixon runs failed to get a first down, Connecticut punted; the kick by Desi Cullen was partially blocked, and South Carolina recovered the ball at the UConn 40-yard line. Garcia promptly completed his deepest pass of the game, a 38-yard connection to wide receiver D.L. Moore. The Gamecocks scored on the next play, a two-yard run by Brian Maddox, which ended the Huskies' bid for a shutout. South Carolina attempted an onside kick to retain possession, but Connecticut recovered the ball. Dixon drove UConn to within the Gamecock 2-yard line; rather than running up the score, the Huskies were content to run out the clock. Connecticut won the game 20–7.

=== Scoring summary ===
Scoring summary

Quarter	Time	Drive			Team	Scoring information	Score	
Quarter	Time	Plays	Yards	TOP	Team	Scoring information	USC	UCONN
1	06:37	9	66	4:14	UCONN	Kashif Moore 37-yard touchdown reception from Zach Frazer, Dave Teggart kick good	0	7
1	03:35	5	16	1:21	UCONN	33-yard field goal by Dave Teggart	0	10
2	08:56	10	40	4:10	UCONN	44-yard field goal by Dave Teggart	0	13
4	13:12	9	35	3:53	UCONN	Andre Dixon 10-yard touchdown run, Dave Teggart kick good	0	20
4	03:24	2	40	0:37	USC	Brian Maddox 2-yard touchdown run, Spencer Lanning kick good	7	20
"TOP" = time of possession. For other American football terms, see Glossary of American football.							7	20

== Final statistics ==
Statistical comparison
	SC	UConn
1st downs	12	17
Total yards	205	253
Passing yards	129	107
Rushing yards	76	146
Penalties	4–41	0–0
3rd down conversions	3–15	9–19
4th down conversions	2–5	0–0
Turnovers	2	1
Time of possession	24:32	35:25

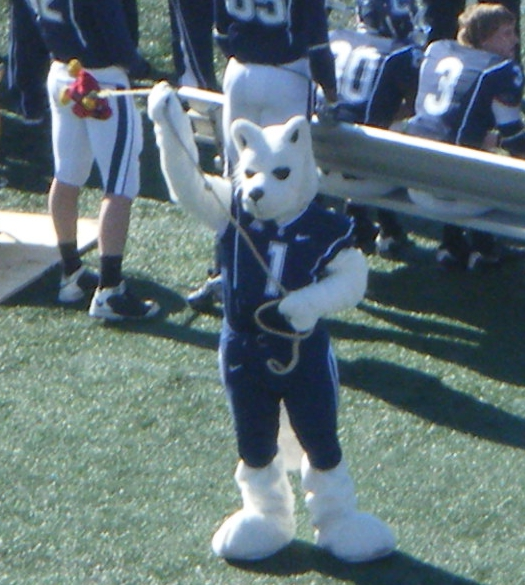
Connecticut mascot Jonathan swings a toy Gamecock behind the UConn bench during the game.

For his performance in the 2010 PapaJohns.com Bowl, Connecticut running back Andre Dixon was named the player of the game. Dixon rushed for 126 yards and a touchdown on 33 carries, giving him 1,093 rushing yards on the year; he became the 12th UConn player to rush for 1,000 yards in a single season. Jordan Todman carried the ball nine times for 36 yards; his 1,118 rushing yards on the season made Connecticut one of three teams in Division I-FBS to have at least two players rush for over 1,000 yards in 2009. (Note: In addition to UConn, Nevada and Georgia Tech were the other two teams to have at least two players rush for more than 1,000 yards.) Wide receiver Kashif Moore was credited with one rushing attempt for one yard, while quarterback Zach Frazer carried the ball twice for a loss of 13 yards.

In the UConn passing game, Frazer completed 9 of 21 passes for 107 yards and a touchdown, with no interceptions. Todman attempted one pass that fell incomplete. Marcus Easley caught four passes for 40 yards; Moore caught two passes for 40 yards and a touchdown. Moore had two pass receptions for 26 yards, while Todman caught one pass for a single yard.

For South Carolina, quarterback Stephen Garcia completed 16 of 38 passes for 129 yards and no touchdowns. He threw one interception, to Connecticut safety Robert Vaughn; this was the fifth consecutive game in which Garcia had thrown an interception. He turned over the ball a second time on a fumble recovered by UConn. Garcia was also the Gamecocks' leading rusher; he ran the ball 15 times for 56 yards. The South Carolina rushing attack was supplemented by running backs Kenny Miles, who had six carries for 24 yards; Bryce Sherman, who had two carries for three yards; and Brian Maddox, who had two carries for two yards and scored the Gamecocks' only touchdown. Wide receiver Stephen Flint lost nine yards on one rushing attempt. In the receiving game, wide receiver D. L. Moore led the team in yardage, with 38 yards on one reception. The leading Gamecock receiver of the season, Alshon Jeffery, had three catches for 28 yards, all in the first half. Running back Kenny Miles had four receptions for 23 yards, while wide receiver Jason Barnes had two catches for 21 yards. Garcia's remaining passes were caught by wide receiver Tori Gurley, who had three catches for 14 yards; Moe Brown, who caught one pass for 12 yards; and tight end Weslye Saunders, who lost seven yards on two receptions.

South Carolina did not gain a first down until its second drive of the second quarter, when Garcia completed a 19-yard pass to Alshon Jeffery on 3rd-and-16. Maddox's late touchdown allowed the Gamecocks to avoid their first shutout in three seasons. UConn did not commit a single penalty.

== Aftermath ==
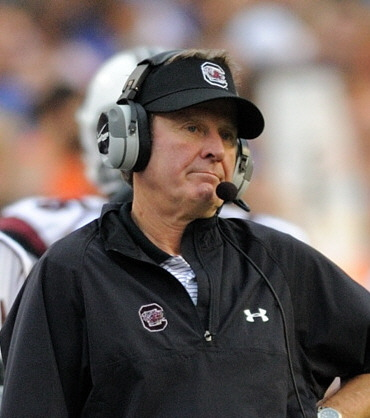
South Carolina head coach Steve Spurrier apologized for his team's performance in the 2010 PapaJohns.com Bowl.

With the win, Connecticut finished the season with a final record of 8–5; South Carolina fell to 7–6. Financially, both teams roughly broke even on the game: the Huskies were given an expense allowance of about $1.2 million from the Big East and spent just over $1 million, while the Gamecocks received just under $1 million from the SEC and spent about $900,000.

In the postgame press conference, South Carolina coach Steve Spurrier said:

"The first thing I want to do, and hopefully half the team does, is apologize to about 30,000 Gamecocks that came down here to see a football game, and we couldn't put one on. I thought we were ready to play. I thought we practiced pretty well. But obviously our offense was very sad, our defense not as good as it's been most of the time. We thoroughly got beat by a better team, a better-disciplined team."

Throughout the offseason, Spurrier apologized for his team's performance, held himself accountable for the loss, and promised the team would perform significantly better the next season. Acknowledging that the team had underperformed expectations, he promised he would resign or retire rather than let the program degenerate to the point where he might be fired or forced out.

Both teams made assistant coaching changes in the offseason. Less than 24 hours after the conclusion of the PapaJohns.com Bowl, South Carolina announced new offensive line coach Shawn Elliott, who previously worked at Appalachian State. Two Connecticut assistants left for other jobs: defensive backs coach Scott Lakatos went to Georgia, while tight ends coach Dave McMichael departed for West Virginia. They were replaced with new defensive backs coach Darrell Perkins, who previously coached at Louisiana-Monroe, and new tight ends coach Jonathan Wholley, a member of the UConn football team between 2001 and 2004 who most recently coached at Fordham.

The Gamecocks performed better in 2010. With a 36–14 win over Florida, South Carolina won the SEC East division and clinched a spot in the SEC Championship Game for the first time in school history. South Carolina finished 2010 on a down note, however, as they lost the championship game 56–17 to eventual 2011 BCS National Championship Game winner Auburn and then lost the 2010 Chick-fil-A Bowl 26–17 to Florida State.

Connecticut began the 2010 season with a 30–10 loss at Michigan. They dropped to 3–4 after seven games with losses to Temple, Rutgers, and Louisville as Zach Frazer was benched and Cody Endres was dismissed from the team. Frazer returned as the starter and the Huskies turned their season around by winning five straight games, good enough to win a share of the Big East conference championship and the right to play in a BCS bowl, even though they were not ranked in the final BCS standings. UConn played in the 2011 Fiesta Bowl, losing 48–20 to Oklahoma. Following the game, coach Randy Edsall left the Huskies to take the head coaching position at Maryland.

Multiple players from the 2010 PapaJohns.com Bowl went on to play professional football; both teams had two players selected in the 2010 National Football League (NFL) draft. For UConn, wide receiver Marcus Easley was selected in the fourth round by the Buffalo Bills, and cornerback Robert McClain was selected in the seventh round by the Carolina Panthers. Gamecock linebacker Eric Norwood was selected in the fourth round by the Panthers. Defensive end Clifton Geathers, selected in the sixth round by the Cleveland Browns, was the other South Carolina player drafted.

The 2010 PapaJohns.com Bowl was the final game by that name. Although Papa John's had an option to renew its sponsorship for two years, it decided not to because of rising costs. The company instead opted to refocus its marketing dollars on the NFL and its sponsorship of Louisville's home field, Papa John's Cardinal Stadium. The game's name changed to the BBVA Compass Bowl starting with the 2011 contest. Per the bowl's website, the 2010 PapaJohns.com Bowl remains the game in the bowl series with the greatest economic impact, at $18.4 million.

== See also ==
- Glossary of American football
- American football positions
