= List of UConn Huskies in the NFL draft =

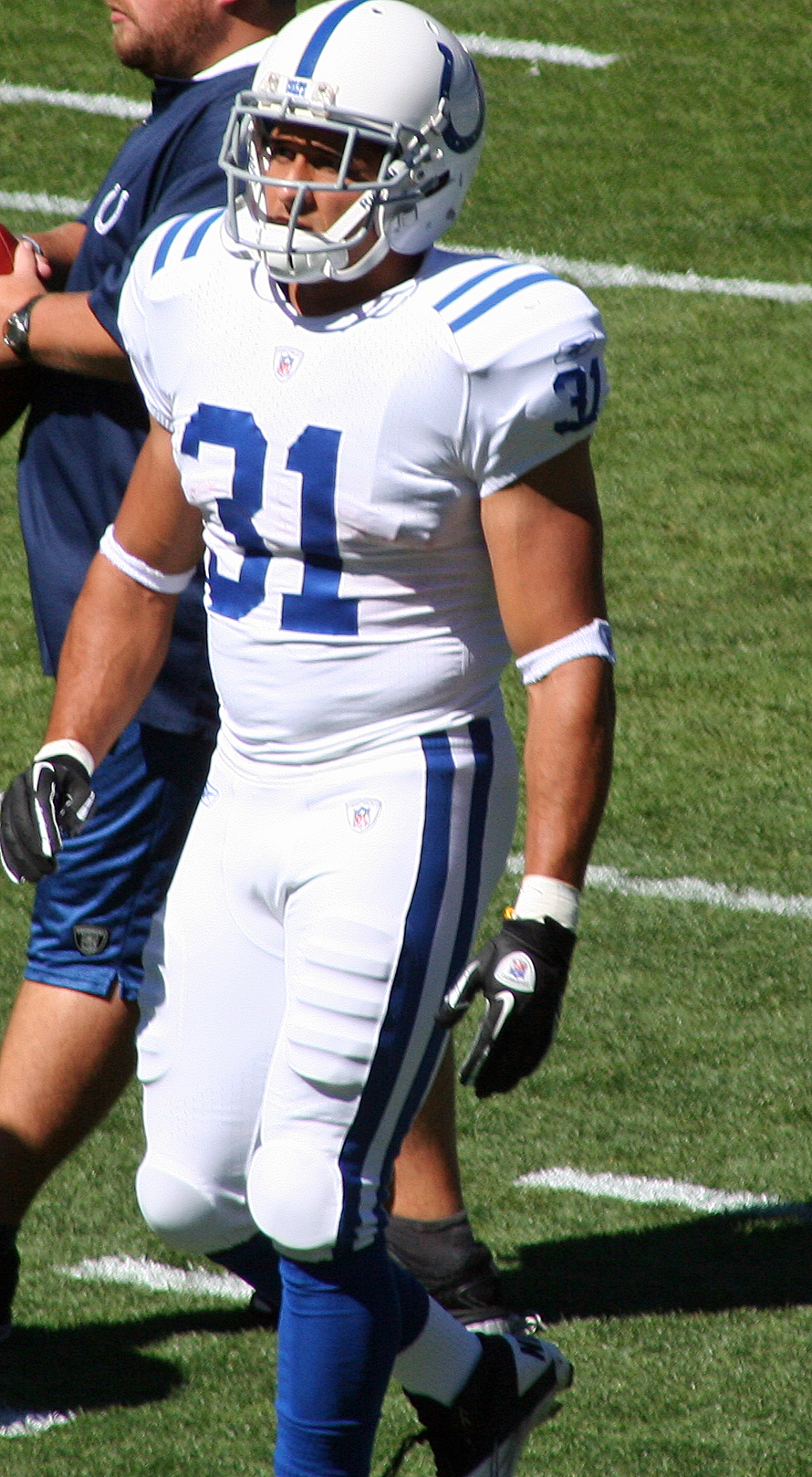
Donald Brown was the first player in UConn Huskies football history to be drafted in the first round.

The University of Connecticut (UConn) Huskies football team has had 46 players selected in the NFL draft. (Note: Because of the NFL–AFL merger agreement, the history of the AFL is officially recognized by the NFL and therefore this list includes the AFL draft (1960–1966). The AFL and NFL held a common draft from 1967–1969; UConn had no players selected during that period.) Two of those selections were in the first round of the draft, both with the 27th overall pick: running back Donald Brown in 2009 and cornerback Byron Jones in 2015.^{[General]} A Connecticut football alumnus had been selected in every NFL draft from 2007 to 2015 and in fourteen of the last eighteen NFL drafts.

Each NFL franchise seeks to add new players through the annual NFL draft. The draft rules were last updated in 2009. The team with the worst record the previous year picks first, the next-worst team second, and so on. Teams that did not make the playoffs are ordered by their regular-season record with any remaining ties broken by strength of schedule. Playoff participants are sequenced after non-playoff teams, based on their round of elimination (wild card, division, conference, and Super Bowl).

Before the merger agreements in 1966, the American Football League (AFL) operated in direct competition with the NFL and held a separate draft. This led to a bidding war over top prospects between the two leagues. As part of the merger agreement on June 8, 1966, the two leagues would hold a multiple round "common draft". Once the AFL officially merged with the NFL in 1970, the "common draft" simply became the NFL draft.

The first Connecticut player to be taken in the NFL draft was Walt Trojanowski in the sixth round of the 1946 NFL draft. From 1946–1994, the Huskies had fourteen players drafted into the NFL over the span of forty-eight years. The rate at which UConn alumni were selected would significantly increase following the Huskies' upgrade from Division I-AA to Division I-A in 2000. (Note: In August 2006 the National Collegiate Athletic Association (NCAA) changed the name of Division I-A to Football Bowl Subdivision (FBS) and Division I-AA to Football Championship Subdivision (FCS).) Beginning in 2005 and continuing through 2015, Connecticut has had twenty-five players picked over eleven NFL drafts. In 2009 four UConn alumni were taken in the first two rounds of the draft. The most Connecticut players to be selected in a single NFL draft was five in 2013, including three in the third round, one in the fourth round, and one in the sixth round.

== Key ==
B	Back	K	Kicker	NT	Nose tackle
C	Center	LB	Linebacker	FB	Fullback
DB	Defensive back	P	Punter	HB	Halfback
DE	Defensive end	QB	Quarterback	WR	Wide receiver
DT	Defensive tackle	RB	Running back	G	Guard
E	End	T	Offensive tackle	TE	Tight end

== Selections ==
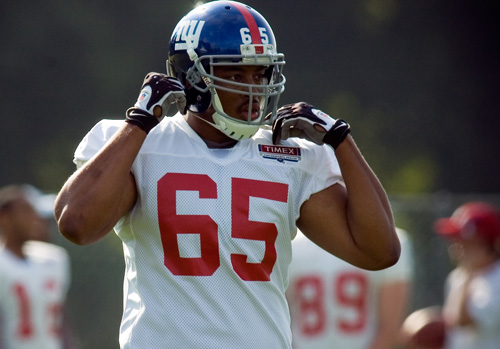
Will Beatty was the first UConn draftee to play for a Super Bowl-winning team: the 2011 New York Giants. (Note: Beatty played the first ten games for the Giants during the 2011 season but after that was placed on injured reserve due to a detached retina. He did not play in Super Bowl XLVI.) (Note: While Beatty was the first Connecticut draftee to play on a Super Bowl-winning team, he was not the first alumnus to be a Super Bowl champion. Nick Giaquinto went undrafted and subsequently won Super Bowl XVII with the Washington Redskins.)

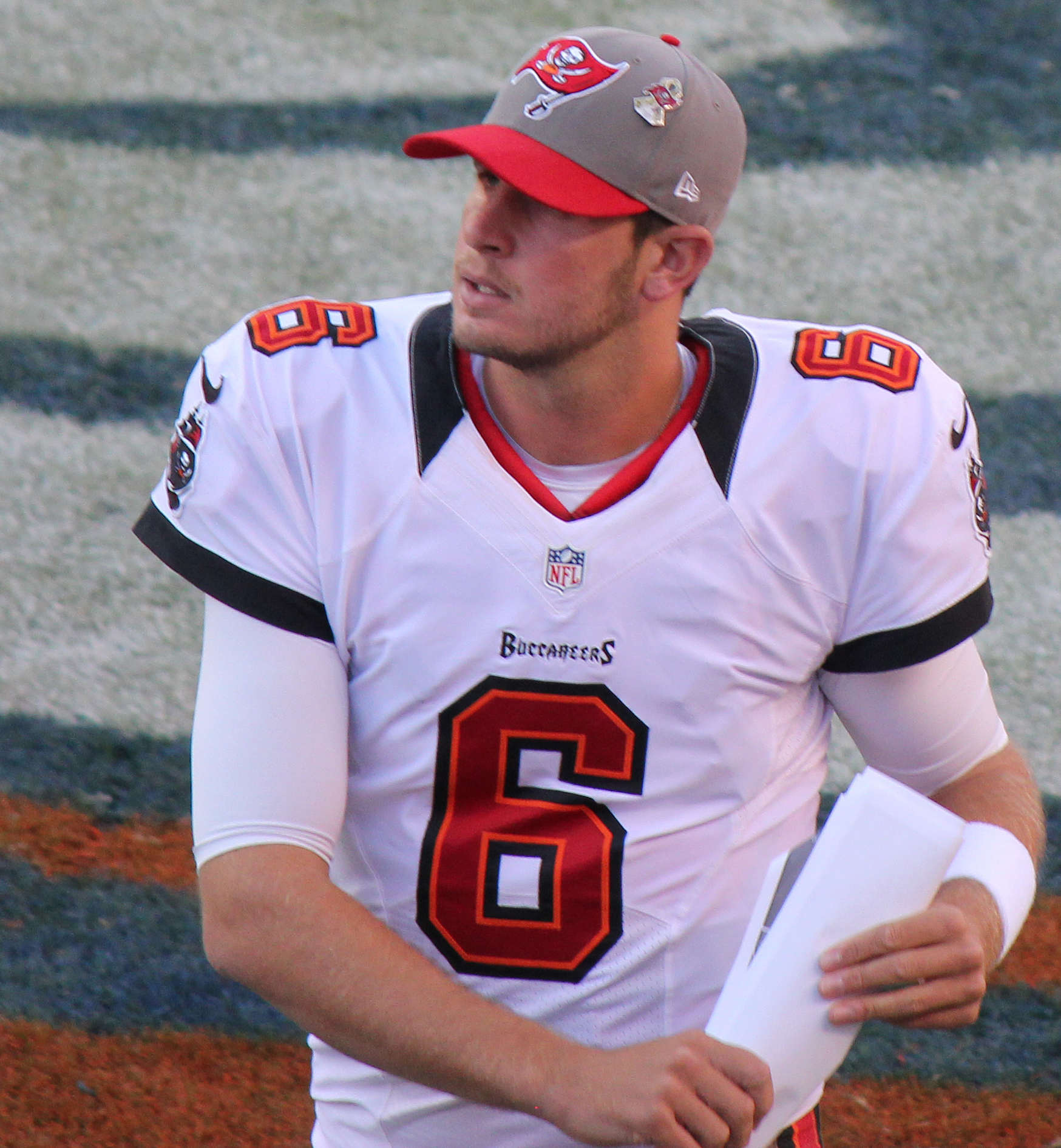
Quarterback Dan Orlovsky was drafted in the 5th round in the 2005 NFL draft by the Detroit Lions.

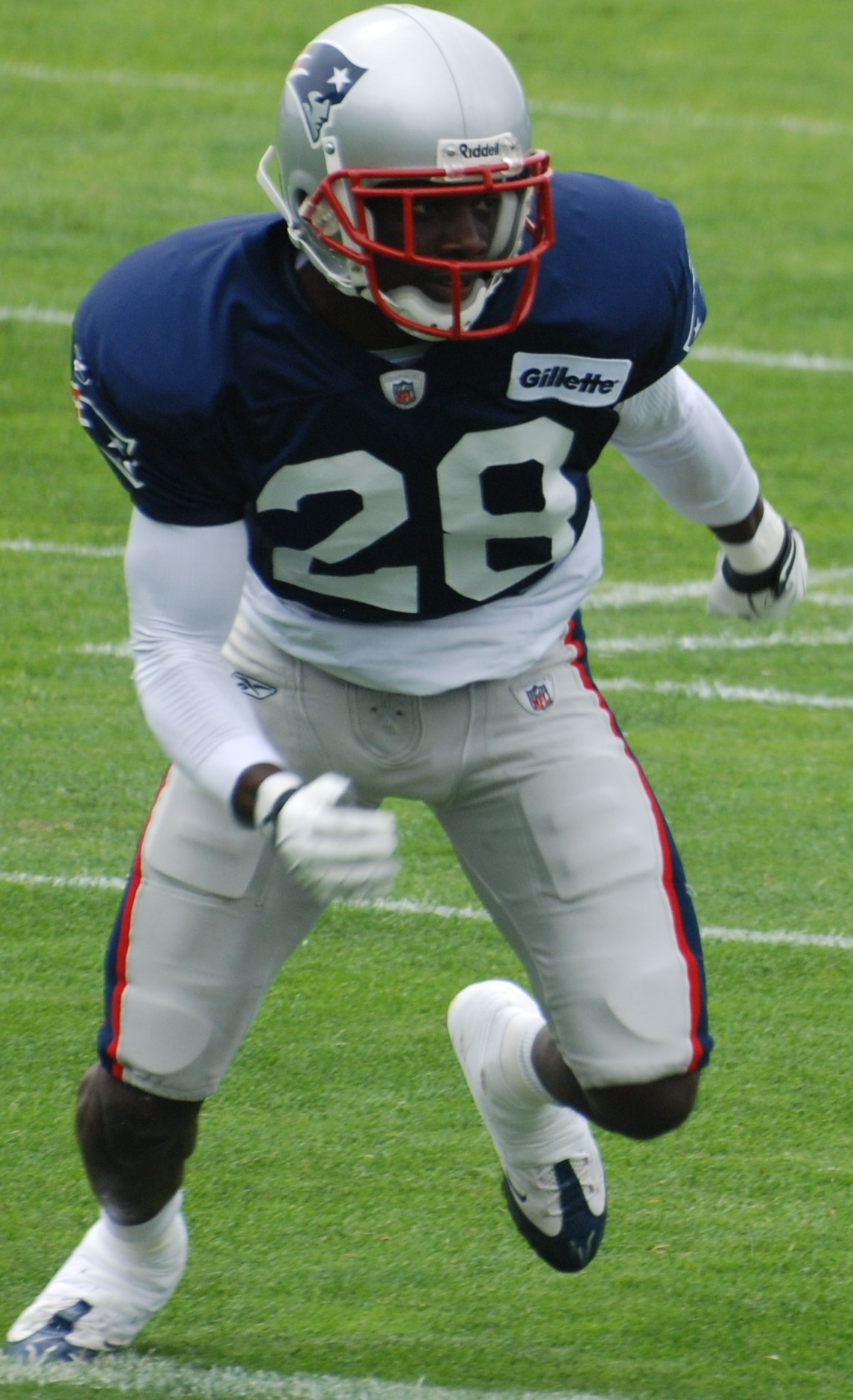
Darius Butler was the first UConn alumnus to be selected in the second round of the NFL draft, in 2009.

=== American Football League ===
Year	Round	Pick	Overall	Player	Team (Note: This is the team that drafted the player, not the player's most recent team.)	Position	Notes	References
1963	4	3	27	John Contoulis	New York Jets	T	–	

=== National Football League ===
Year	Round	Pick	Overall	Player	Team	Position	Notes	References
1946	6	9	49	Walt Trojanowski	Washington Redskins	B	–	–
1946	9	4	74	Walt Dropo	Chicago Bears	E	(Note: Walt Dropo was also selected 4th overall in the 1947 Basketball Association of America (BAA) draft by the Providence Steamrollers. He elected to play in neither league and instead signed a free agent contract with Major League Baseball's Boston Red Sox. He would be named American League Rookie of the Year in 1950.) (Note: Walt and Milt Dropo were brothers.)	
1947	24	9	224	Bill Moll	New York Giants	B	–	–
1947	28	4	259	Milt Dropo	Washington Redskins	C		–
1958	18	5	210	Lenny King	Washington Redskins	B	–	–
1962	11	13	153	Dave Bishop	New York Giants	B	–	–
1962	16	3	213	John Contoulis	New York Giants	T	–	
1971	4	24	102	Vince Clements	Minnesota Vikings	RB	–	
1974	11	12	272	Eric Torkelson	Green Bay Packers	RB	–	
1980	8	28	221	Ted Walton	Pittsburgh Steelers	DB	–	–
1984	4	15	99	John Dorsey	Green Bay Packers	LB	–	
1989	9	15	238	David Franks	Seattle Seahawks	G	–	–
1992	12	10	318	Cornelius Benton	Seattle Seahawks	G	–	–
1994	6	29	190	Paul Duckworth	Green Bay Packers	LB	–	–
2005	3	18	82	Alfred Fincher	New Orleans Saints	LB	–	
2005	5	9	145	Dan Orlovsky	Detroit Lions	QB	–	
2007	6	21	195	Deon Anderson	Dallas Cowboys	RB	–	
2008	4	1	100	Tyvon Branch	Oakland Raiders	DB	–	
2008	6	29	195	Donald Thomas	Miami Dolphins	G	–	
2009	1	27	27	Donald Brown	Indianapolis Colts	RB	–	
2009	2	9	41	Darius Butler	New England Patriots	DB	–	
2009	2	28	60	Will Beatty	New York Giants	T	Super Bowl champion (XLVI)	
2009	2	31	63	Cody Brown	Arizona Cardinals	LB	–	
2010	4	9	107	Marcus Easley	Buffalo Bills	WR	–	
2010	7	42	249	Robert McClain	Carolina Panthers	DB	–	
2011	5	5	136	Anthony Sherman	Arizona Cardinals	FB	Super Bowl champion (LIV)	
2011	6	1	166	Lawrence Wilson	Carolina Panthers	LB	–	
2011	6	18	183	Jordan Todman	San Diego Chargers	RB	–	
2011	7	34	237	Greg Lloyd	Philadelphia Eagles	LB	–	
2012	2	17	49	Kendall Reyes	San Diego Chargers	DT	–	
2013	3	2	64	Dwayne Gratz	Jacksonville Jaguars	DB	–	
2013	3	4	66	Sio Moore	Oakland Raiders	LB	–	
2013	3	8	70	Blidi Wreh-Wilson	Tennessee Titans	DB	–	
2013	4	27	124	Trevardo Williams	Houston Texans	DE	–	
2013	6	33	201	Ryan Griffin	Houston Texans	TE	–	
2014	7	5	220	Shamar Stephen	Minnesota Vikings	DT	–	
2014	7	38	253	Yawin Smallwood	Atlanta Falcons	LB	–	
2015	1	27	27	Byron Jones	Dallas Cowboys	DB	–	
2015	6	10	186	Geremy Davis	New York Giants	WR	–	
2017	2	24	56	Obi Melifonwu	Oakland Raiders	DB	–	–
2018	6	6	180	Folorunso Fatukasi	New York Jets	DT	–	–
2020	3	35	99	Matt Peart	New York Giants	T	–	–
2022	3	12	76	Travis Jones	Baltimore Ravens	DT	–	–
2024	3	17	81	Christian Haynes	Seattle Seahawks	G	–	–
2025	6	30	206	Chase Lundt	Buffalo Bills	T	–	–
2026	4	25	125	Skyler Bell	Buffalo Bills	WR	–	–
