= Andre Dixon =

American gridiron football player (born 1986)

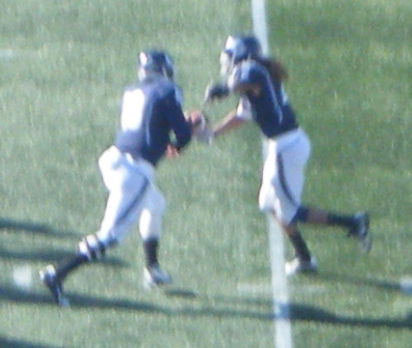
- Dixon handing off to Zach Frazer during the 2010 PapaJohns.com Bowl

No. 26, 33
- Position: Running back

Personal information
- Born: February 6, 1988 (age 38); New Brunswick, New Jersey, U.S.
- Listed height: 6 ft 1 in (1.85 m)
- Listed weight: 205 lb (93 kg)

Career information
- High school: New Brunswick
- College: Connecticut
- NFL draft: 2010: undrafted

Career history
- Hartford Colonials (2010); Sacramento Mountain Lions (2011); Calgary Stampeders (2013)*; FXFL Blacktips (2015)
- * Offseason or practice squad member only

Awards and highlights
- First-team All-Big East (2007)

Andre Jamar Dixon (born February 19, 1986) is an American former football running back. He played college football for the Connecticut Huskies and professionally in the United Football League (UFL).

== Early life ==
Dixon attended New Brunswick High School. He rushed for 1,018 yards as a senior with 20 touchdowns and earned four varsity football letters.

== College career ==
Dixon enrolled to Connecticut and was redshirted during his freshman season in 2005. In 2006, he played in four games and appeared in each of the final three contests as a kickoff returner. In 2007 Dixon missed the first two games of the year but he returned to gain 809 rushing yards on 160 carries (5.1 average) with three touchdowns while also catching 24 passes for 280 yards and a touchdown. His 280 receiving yards are the most by a UConn running back since Chad Martin had 319 in 1998. One of his best season performances was against South Florida, when he rushed for a career-high 167 yards on a career-best 32 carries, posting 210 all-purpose yards. He split game time with Donald Brown. He was named to the second-team All-Big East along with Tyvon Branch.

For the 2008 season, Dixon sprained his ankle in the preseason, opening the door for Donald Brown to step into the starting role.

In December 2008 Dixon, was suspended indefinitely from the football team following an arrest on drunken-driving charge. He was reinstated to the team shortly before the Huskies played the 2009 International Bowl on January 3, 2009.

In the 2010 PapaJohns.com Bowl, Dixon was named player of the game, and finished with 126 rushing yards and one touchdown.

== Professional career ==
After going undrafted in the 2010 NFL draft, Dixon attended rookie minicamp with the New York Giants on a tryout basis in April 2010 but was not signed.

Dixon tried out for the Hartford Colonials of the United Football League. He was later drafted in the first round of the 2010 UFL draft by the Hartford Colonials as the number two overall pick. He made his debut September 18, 2010 at home against the Sacramento Mountain Lions in which he had a game high 94 rushing yards on 21 attempts.

On August 19, 2011, Dixon signed with the Sacramento Mountain Lions. He was cut by the Mountain Lions on December 26, 2011.

In the off-season before the start of the 2013 CFL season Dixon signed with the Calgary Stampeders of the Canadian Football League. He was released prior to the start of the season.

Dixon signed with the Blacktips of the Fall Experimental Football League (FXFL) in 2015.
